= 2021 Wild Aces season =

- Owner: Greg Miller
- Offensive coordinator: Carl Hargrave
- Home field: Infinite Energy Arena

Results
- Record: 4–2
- League place: 1st
- Playoff finish: Won The People's Championship v1.0 (Glacier Boyz)

The 2021 season is the Wild Aces' inaugural season in the Fan Controlled Football League (FCFL). They went on to finish the regular season 2–2. Ladarius Galloway won the regular season Offensive MVP and Joseph Putu won the Defensive MVP.

They faced the Zappers in the Semifinals and won the game 32–6, allowing them to advance to the championship. The Aces won The People's Championship v1.0 against the Glacier Boyz 36–30. Ed Crouch won the People's Championship Gatorade MVP award. They would finish the entire season 4–2.

== Staff ==
Wild Aces v1.0 staff
Wild Aces Owners: Owner – Greg Miller; Owner – Austin Ekeler; Owner – Jack Settleman; Owner – Rachel Lindsay; Owner – Barbara Dunkelman; Wild Aces Coaching Staff: Offensive coordinator – Carl Hargrave; FCF Coaching Staff: Offensive assistant – Marvin Williams; Superbacks coach – Ivy Williams; Wide receivers coach – Carl Hargrave; Wide receivers coach – Robert Ford; Tight ends coach – Drew Tate; Offensive line coach – Jim Phillips; Defensive coach – Don Unamba; Defensive line coach – Chase Baker; Linebackers coach – Howard Tippett; FCF Training Staff: Head strength and conditioning coach – Bill Hughan; Head athletic training – Sarah Johnson; Assistant athletic trainer – Jordan Stuckey; Athletic trainer intern – DeAndrea Hudson; Athletic trainer & strength coach intern – Ariel Braxton; Head equipment manager – Jeff Bower; Assistant equipment manager – Earl Biscoe; Equipment manager intern – Zach Birkhead; Equipment manager intern – Felix Melki

== Final roster ==
Wild Aces roster
Quarterbacks: 5 Ed Crouch; 8 Jackson Erdmann; Super backs: 20 Berkley Edwards; 37 Ladarius Galloway; 39 Daryl Virgies; Wide receivers: 1 James Harden; 16 Douglas McNeil; 17 Richaud Floyd; 27 Raphael Leonard; Tight ends: 41 David Meza; 43 Elkanah Dillon; 85 Jeremiah Houston	Offensive linemen: 61 Justin Brown C; 66 Lawrence Keys C; 71 Kamalie Matthews T; 74 Patrick Allen C; 79 D'Marcus Hayes T; Defense: 26 Benjamin Hunt IV CB; 29 Dillon Winfrey CB; 32 Darreon Jackson S; 36 Karheem Darrington CB; 46 Joseph Putu CB; 47 James Gales Jr. S; 50 Max Davis LB; 55 Fredrick Conyers LB; 56 Jeremiah Dadeboe LB; 67 Clavacia Love DE; 91 Dakavian Champion DT; 92 James Lee DE; 93 Travonte Valentine DT; 94 Shawn Oakman DE; 95 Kyle Kitchens DE; 96 Joe Tito DE; 97 Owen Obasuyi DE	Keepers: 8 Jackson Erdmann; 17 Richaud Floyd; 27 Raphael Leonard; 37 Ladarius Galloway; 46 Joseph Putu; Rookies in italics Roster updated September 28, 2022 25 active → Fan Controlled Football

== Regular season ==
=== Schedule ===
Week	Date	Time (ET)	Opponent	Result	Record	Venue	TV	Recap
1	February 13	7:30 p.m.	Glacier Boyz	W 33–22	1–0	Infinite Energy Arena	Twitch	Recap
2	February 20	7:30 p.m.	Beasts	L 28–30	1–1	Infinite Energy Arena	Twitch	Recap
3	February 27	7:55 p.m.	Zappers	L 30–34	1–2	Infinite Energy Arena	Twitch	Recap
4	March 6	7:30 p.m.	Glacier Boyz	W 56–52	2–2	Infinite Energy Arena	Twitch	Recap
Legend: – Light green background indicates a victory. – Light red background indicates a loss.

=== Game summaries ===
==== Week 1: vs. Glacier Boyz ====
Week 1: Wild Aces vs Glacier Boyz – Game summary

Quarter	1	2	Total
Wild Aces	14	16	30
Glacier Boyz	14	8	22

at Infinite Energy Arena, Atlanta, Georgia

- Date: February 13
- Game time: 7:30 p.m. ET
- Game weather: Indoor
- TV: Twitch
- Recap

Game information
First half
- GLA – David Pindell 11-yard run (pass failed), 14:22. Glacier Boyz 6–0. Drive: 5 plays, 40 yards, 5:38.
- WLD – Calen Campbell 5-yard run (Jackson Erdmann–Rachaud Floyd pass), 5:27. Wild Aces 8–6. Drive: 9 plays, 40 yards, 8:55.
- GLA – Andrew Jamiel 28-yard pass from David Pindell (David Pindell–James Harden pass), 0:37. Glacier Boyz 14–8. Drive: 7 plays, 40 yards, 4:50.
- WLD – Jeremiah Houston 22-yard pass from Ed Crouch (pass failed), 0:01. Tied 14–14. Drive: 4 plays, 40 yards, 0:36.

Second half

- WLD – Ed Crouch 22-yard run (Ed Crouch–Douglas McNeil pass), 14:51. Wild Aces 22–14. Drive: 6 plays, 40 yards, 5:10.
- GLA – Andrew Jamiel 8-yard pass from Deondre Francois (Deondre Francois–Joseph Boykin pass), 9:10. Tied 22–22. Drive: 5 plays, 40 yards, 5:41.
- WLD – Calen Campbell 4-yard run (Ed Crouch–Rachaud Floyd pass), 1:59. Wild Aces 30–22. Drive: 7 plays, 40 yards, 7:05.

==== Week 2: vs. Beasts ====
Week 2: Beasts vs Wild Aces – Game summary

Quarter	1	2	Total
Beasts	16	14	30
Wild Aces	22	6	28

at Infinite Energy Arena, Atlanta, Georgia

- Date: February 20
- Game time: 7:30 p.m. ET
- Game weather: Indoor
- TV: Twitch
- Recap

Game information
First half
- WLD – Jeremiah Houston 15-yard pass from Deondre Francois (pass failed), 16:12. Wild Aces 6–0. Drive: 3 plays, 40 yards, 4:38.
- BST – Dane Key 40-yard pass from Quinton Flowers (Quinton Flowers–Christian Saulsberry), 16:05. Beasts 8–6. Drive: 1 plays, 40 yards, 0:07.
- WLD – Ed Crouch 8-yard run (Ed Crouch–Isaiah King), 10:41. Wild Aces 14–8. Drive: 6 plays, 40 yards, 5:24.
- BST – Quinton Flowers 3-yard run (Quinton Flowers–Damon Sheehy-Guiseppi), 5:02. Beasts 16–14. Drive: 5 plays, 40 yards, 5:39.
- WLD – Richaud Floyd 25-yard pass from Deondre Francois (Deondre Francois–Richaud Floyd), 2:29. Wild Aces 22–16. Drive: 3 plays, 40 yards, 2:33.

Second half

- BST – Quinton Flowers 1-yard run (Quinton Flowers–Chris Bazile), 10:33. Beasts 22–20. Drive: 8 plays, 40 yards, 9:27.
- WLD – Daryl Virgies 4-yard run (pass failed), 5:34. Wild Aces 28–24. Drive: 5 plays, 40 yards, 4:59.
- WLD – TJ Edwards II 3-yard run, 0:00. Beasts 30–28. Drive: 9 plays, 40 yards, 5:34.

==== Week 3: vs. Zappers ====
Week 3: Wild Aces vs Zappers – Game summary

Quarter	1	2	Total
Wild Aces	8	22	30
Zappers	22	12	34

at Infinite Energy Arena, Atlanta, Georgia

- Date: February 27
- Game time: 7:55 p.m. ET
- Game weather: Indoor
- TV: Twitch
- Recap

Game information
First half
- ZAP – Travis Toivonen 21-yard pass from Logan Marchi (Logan Marchi–Dane Key), 17:37. Zappers 8–0. Drive: 3 plays, 40 yards, 2:23.
- ZAP – Travis Toivonen 21-yard pass from Logan Marchi (Logan Marchi–Dane Key), 17:37. Zappers 8–0. Drive: 3 plays, 40 yards, 2:23.

Second half

== Postseason ==
=== Schedule ===
Playoff round	Date	Opponent (seed)	Result	Record	Venue	Recap
Semifinals	March 13	Zappers (3)	W 32–6	3–2	Infinite Energy Arena	Recap
People's Championship v1.0	March 20	Glacier Boyz (4)	W 36–30	4–2	Infinite Energy Arena	Recap

== End of the season ==
=== Standings ===
FCFL
	W	L	T	PCT	PF	PA	STK
Wild Aces	4	2	0	.667	144	134	W3
Beasts	3	2	0	.600	132	126	L2
Zappers	2	3	0	.400	138	134	L1
Glacier Boyz	2	4	0	.333	126	142	L1

=== Records established ===
Since it was the franchise's first season these statistics are the records set by players for Season v1.0.

Season
Statistic	Player	Value
Passing
Completions	Jackson Erdmann	20 completions
Attempts	Jackson Erdmann	37 attempts
Yards	Jackson Erdmann	284 yards
Touchdowns	Jackson Erdmann	6 TDs
Interceptions	Jackson Erdmann	1 INT
Rushing
Attempts	Ladarius Galloway	46 attempts
Yards	Ladarius Galloway	313 yards
Touchdowns	Ladarius Galloway	7 TDs
Receiving
Receptions	Raphael Leonard	10 receptions
Yards	Elkanah Dillon	138 yards
Touchdowns	Jeremiah Houston	4 TDs
Defense
Tackles	Darreon Jackson	10.0 tackles
Sacks	Owen Obasuyi	4.0 sacks
Forced fumbles	Owen Obasuyi	1 FF
Fumble recoveries	Owen Obasuyi	1 FR
Fumble return yards	Owen Obasuyi	13 yards
Interceptions	Joseph Putu	2 INTs
Interception return yards	Dillon Winfrey	48 yards

Game
Statistic	Player	Game	Value
Passing
Completions	Jackson Erdmann	Glacier Boyz (Week 4)	6 completions
Attempts	Jackson Erdmann	Glacier Boyz (Week 4)	13 attempts
Yards	Jackson Erdmann	Glacier Boyz (Week 4)	102 yards
Touchdowns	Deondre Francois	Beasts (Week 2)	2 TDs
Touchdowns	Jackson Erdmann	Glacier Boyz (Week 4)	2 TDs
Touchdowns	Ed Crouch	Glacier Boyz (Week 4)	2 TDs
Interceptions	Jackson Erdmann	Zappers (Week 3)	1 INT
Longest pass	Ed Crouch	Glacier Boyz (Week 6)	36 yards
Rushing
Attempts	Ladarius Galloway	Glacier Boyz (Week 6)	14 attempts
Yards	Ladarius Galloway	Glacier Boyz (Week 6)	105 yards
Touchdowns	Ladarius Galloway	Glacier Boyz (Week 4)	3 TDs
Touchdowns	Ladarius Galloway	Glacier Boyz (Week 6)	3 TDs
Longest run	Daryl Virgies	Zappers (Week 5)	48 yards
Receiving
Receptions	Travis Toivonen	Glacier Boyz (Week 1)	3 receptions
Receptions	Raphael Leonard	Zappers (Week 3)	3 receptions
Receptions	Raphael Leonard	Glacier Boyz (Week 4)	3 receptions
Yards	Elkanah Dillon	Glacier Boyz (Week 4)	68 yards
Touchdowns	Raphael Leonard	Zappers (Week 3)	2 TDs
Touchdowns	Elkanah Dillon	Glacier Boyz (Week 4)	2 TDs
Longest reception	Elkanah Dillon	Glacier Boyz (Week 6)	36 yards
Defense
Tackles	Joseph Putu	Zappers (Week 5)	6.5 tackles
Tackles	Darreon Jackson	Glacier Boyz (Week 6)	6.5 tackles
Sacks	Owen Obasuyi	Zappers (Week 5)	2.0 sacks
Forced fumbles	Owen Obasuyi	Zappers (Week 5)	1 FF
Fumble recoveries	Owen Obasuyi	Zappers (Week 5)	1 FR
Fumble return yards	Owen Obasuyi	Zappers (Week 5)	14 yards
Longest fumble return	Owen Obasuyi	Zappers (Week 5)	14 yards
Interceptions	Joseph Putu	Glacier Boyz (Week 4)	2 INTs
Interception return yards	Dillon Winfrey	Zappers (Week 5)	48 yards
Longest interception return	Dillon Winfrey	Zappers (Week 5)	48 yards

=== Awards ===
Award	Player	Ref.
Offensive MVP	Ladarius Galloway	
Defensive MVP	Joseph Putu	
Champion of the Fans	Jackson Erdmann	
Finals MVP	Ed Crouch	
