= LaDarius Galloway =

American football player (born 1997)

Profile
- Position: Running back

Personal information
- Born: April 3, 1997 (age 29); Indianola, Mississippi, U.S.
- Listed height: 5 ft 10 in (1.78 m)
- Listed weight: 200 lb (91 kg)

Career information
- High school: Gentry (Indianola, Mississippi)
- College: Copiah–Lincoln (2015–2016); UT Martin (2017–2018)

Career history
- 2019: Calgary Stampeders*
- 2021: FCF Wild Aces
- 2021: TSL Sea Lions
- 2022: Frisco Fighters
- 2022: FCF Shoulda Been Stars
- 2022: Arkansas Attack*
- 2023: Seattle Sea Dragons*
- 2024: Tulsa Oilers*
- * Offseason or practice squad member only

Awards and highlights
- FCF people's champion (2021); FCF Offensive MVP (2021); FCF rushing yards leader (2021); FCF rushing touchdowns leader (2021); TSL rushing yards leader (2021); Second-team All-OVC (2017); OVC All-Newcomer Team (2017); MACJC Second-team All-State (2016)
- Stats at CFL.ca

LaDarius D. Galloway (born April 3, 1997), nicknamed "G-Way", is an American football running back. He played college football at Copiah–Lincoln before transferring to UT Martin in 2017.

== Early life ==
Galloway went to Gentry High School in Indianola, Mississippi. In his high school football career, he had 457 carries for 4,725 yards and 40 touchdowns, including his senior season where he rushed for 2,005 yards on 159 carries and 20 touchdowns.

== College career ==
=== Copiah–Lincoln (2015–2016) ===
Galloway played for the Copiah–Lincoln Wolf Pack for the 2015 and 2016 seasons. In his sophomore season, he rushed for 1,003 yards and found the endzone ten times, earning MACJC Second-Team All-State honors in the process.

=== UT Martin (2017–2018) ===
==== 2017 season ====
In 2017, Galloway transferred to the University of Tennessee at Martin to play football. Against Ole Miss, Galloway rushed for 188 yards on 24 carries and had one rushing touchdown. He earned OVC Offensive Player and Newcomer of the Week for his performance. Two weeks later, Galloway earned OVC Co-Offensive Player of the Week and Newcomer of the Week honors again after rushing for 90 yards and two touchdowns while catching two passes for 28 yards. Galloway finished the season with 859 rushing yards on 172 carries and four touchdowns while racking up 22 receptions for 307 yards. He earned a Second-Team All-OVC and an OVC All-Newcomer Team selection after the season.

==== 2018 season ====
Prior to the 2018 season, Galloway was selected as a Preseason All-OVC selection by the conference and Phil Steele. His best game of the season came on October 20, where he had 18 carries for 78 yards and two touchdowns against Eastern Illinois. On senior day against Tennessee Tech, Galloway finished with 52 rushing yards and a touchdown to end his college career. Galloway finished the season with 136 carries for 540 yards and five touchdowns while also having 28 receptions for 248 yards and two touchdowns.

== Professional career ==
=== Calgary Stampeders (2019) ===
On May 7, 2019, Galloway was signed by the Calgary Stampeders of the Canadian Football League (CFL). In the preseason, Galloway rushed for 45 yards on four carries and had four catches for 37 yards. After playing in the preseason, he was cut.

=== FCF Wild Aces (2021) ===
Galloway joined the newly started Fan Controlled Football League before the start of the 2021 season. After being drafted to the FCF Beasts in Week 1, Galloway was franchise tagged by the FCF Wild Aces before the Week 2 draft. In his Wild Aces debut, he rushed for 39 yards on six carries. In Week 3, Galloway led all rushers with 42 yards on eight carries against the FCF Zappers. In Week 4, Galloway had 13 carries for 105 yards and three touchdowns. In the first round of the playoffs, Galloway rushed for 57 yards on five carries and a touchdown to help the Wild Aces beat the Zappers, 32–6. Before the 2021 People's Championship, Galloway was named Gatorade Offensive Most Valuable Player of the 2021 regular season. He rushed for 74 rushing yards and three touchdowns in the title game to win his first professional championship, 46–40, against the FCF Glacier Boyz.

=== TSL Sea Lions (2021) ===
Galloway joined The Spring League during the 2021 season and was assigned to the Sea Lions. In Week 2, Galloway rushed for 120 yards and a touchdown. He earned South Division Player of the Week afterward. Galloway finished the season playing in all six games, leading the league in rushing yards with 319 yards on 50 attempts and two touchdowns.

=== Frisco Fighters (2022) ===
Galloway joined the Frisco Fighters of the Indoor Football League (IFL) on December 13, 2021, to play in the 2022 season. Galloway didn't make his debut until Week 19, where he rushed for seven yards on four attempts. He also had two receptions for 15 yards. He was cut prior to the 2023 season.

=== FCF Shoulda Been Stars (2022) ===
Galloway was franchise tagged by the FCF Shoulda Been Stars, to start the 2022 FCF season. In their Week 2 game against the Beasts, Galloway had ten carries for 62 yards and three touchdowns, earning Gatorade Player of the Game in the process. After their Week 3 game, Galloway stepped away from the team for personal reasons.

=== Arkansas Attack (2022) ===
Galloway was set to play for the Arkansas Attack of Major League Football (MLFB) in 2022 but was released after the league shut down.

=== Seattle Sea Dragons (2023) ===
On January 6, 2023, Galloway was assigned to the Seattle Sea Dragons of the XFL as part of the 2023 XFL Draft NFL Alumni Academy Player allocation. Before the regular season started, Galloway, along with six others, was released.

=== Tulsa Oilers (2024) ===
Galloway signed with the Tulsa Oilers before the start of the 2024 IFL season. He was cut prior to the Oilers first game.

== Career statistics ==
=== Professional ===
==== Regular season ====
Year	Team	Games		Rushing					Receiving				
Year	Team	GP	GS	Att	Yds	Avg	Lng	TD	Rec	Yds	Avg	Lng	TD
Fan Controlled Football League
2021	WLD	4	4	32	239	7.5	25	4	4	69	17.3	40	1
2022	SBS	3	3	31	141	4.6	15	6	0	0	0.0	0	0
FCF career		7	7	63	380	6.0	25	10	4	69	17.3	40	1
The Spring League
2021	SL	6	6	50	319	6.4	37	2	9	47	5.2	11	0
TSL career		6	6	50	319	6.4	37	2	9	47	5.2	11	0
Indoor Football League
2022	FRI	1	1	4	7	1.8	8	0	2	15	7.5	10	0
IFL career		1	1	4	7	1.8	8	0	2	15	7.5	10	0

==== Postseason ====
Year	Team	Games		Rushing					Receiving				
Year	Team	GP	GS	Att	Yds	Avg	Lng	TD	Rec	Yds	Avg	Lng	TD
Fan Controlled Football League
2021	WLD	2	2	19	131	6.9	18	4	1	9	9.0	9	0
FCF career		2	2	19	131	6.9	18	4	1	9	9.0	9	0

=== College ===
Season	GP	Rushing					Receiving		
Season	GP	Att	Yds	Avg	Lng	TD	Rec	Yds	TD
Copiah–Lincoln Wolf Pack
2015	9	89	500	5.6	75	3	16	78	0
2016	9	182	1,003	5.5	42	10	14	108	0
UT Martin Skyhawks
2017	11	172	859	5.0	59	4	22	307	0
2018	11	136	540	4.0	23	5	28	248	2
Career	40	579	2,452	4.2	59	22	80	741	2

== Personal life ==
Galloway is the son of Armeil Galloway and Farrah Young. He has three siblings, Latiyia, Ladaisha, and Willdarius. While he is not playing football, Galloway works for Amazon and trains kids to play football.
