= Quinton Flowers =

American football player (born 1994)

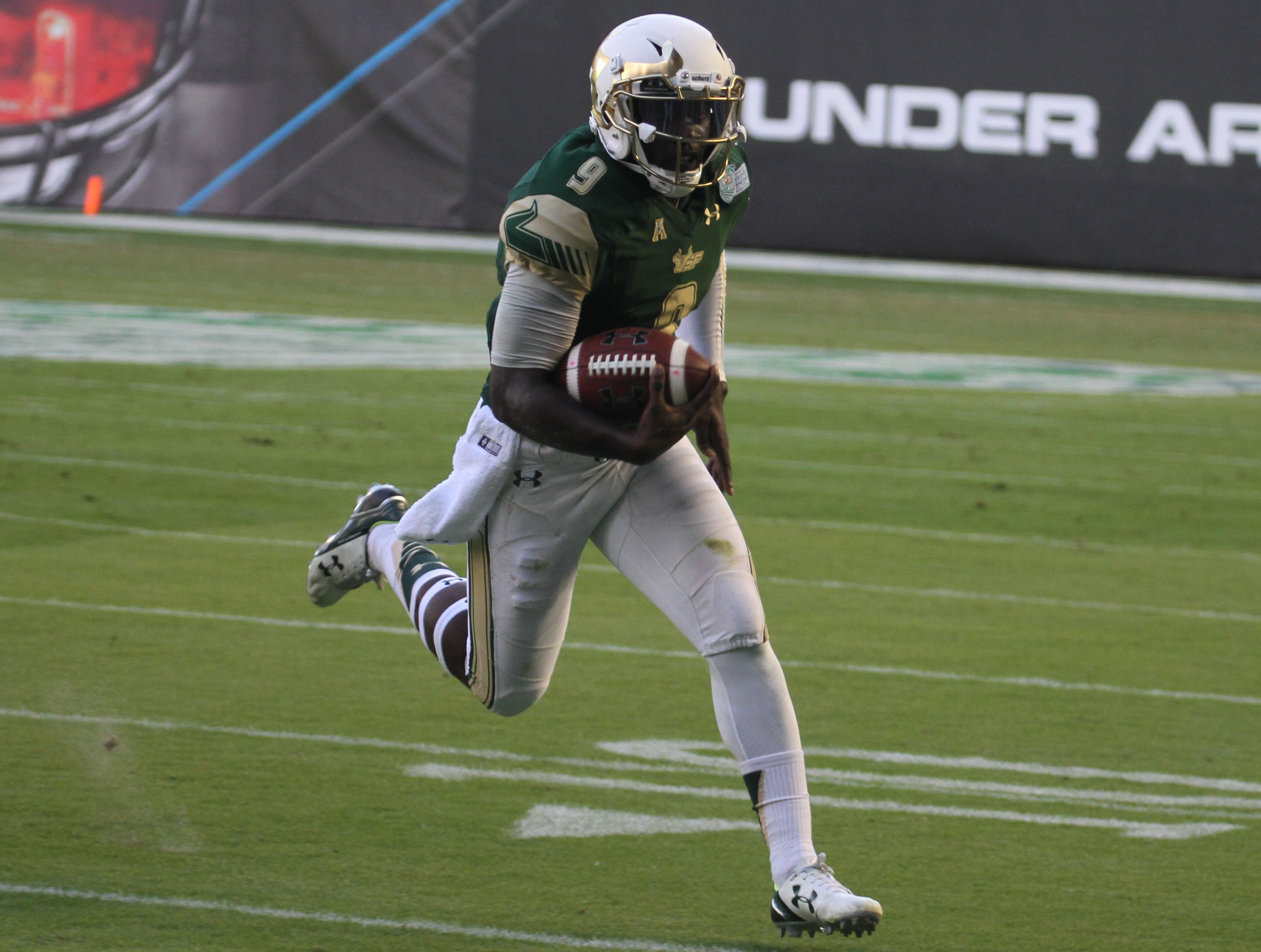
- Flowers in 2015

No. 5
- Position: Quarterback

Personal information
- Born: December 2, 1994 (age 31); Miami, Florida, U.S.
- Listed height: 5 ft 10 in (1.78 m)
- Listed weight: 211 lb (96 kg)

Career information
- High school: Miami Jackson
- College: South Florida (2014–2017)
- NFL draft: 2018: undrafted

Career history
- Cincinnati Bengals (2018); Indianapolis Colts (2019)*; Tampa Bay Vipers (2020); FCF Beasts (2021); Orlando Guardians (2023)
- * Offseason or practice squad member only

Awards and highlights
- CFPA National Performer of the Year (2016); AAC Offensive Player of the Year (2016); 2× Birmingham Bowl MVP (2016, 2017); First-team All-AAC (2016); Second-team All-AAC (2017)
- Stats at Pro Football Reference

Quinton Lenard Flowers (born December 2, 1994) is an American former professional football quarterback. He played college football for the South Florida Bulls.

== Early life ==
Flowers attended Miami Jackson High School in Miami, Florida. During his career, he passed 6,042 yards and had 2,002 yards rushing with 32 touchdowns. He committed to the University of South Florida (USF) to play college football.

== College career ==
=== 2014 season ===
As a true freshman at South Florida, Flowers played in five games and made one start. He finished the season with 111 passing yards and two interceptions and also had 73 yards rushing.

=== 2015 season ===
Flowers was named the starting quarterback in 2015. He started all 13 games, completing 162 of 275 passes for 2,290 yards with a school record 22 passing touchdowns and eight interceptions. He also rushed for 991 yards and 12 touchdowns.

=== 2016 season ===
Flowers returned as the starter in 2016. After rushing for a school record, 1,530 yards and 18 touchdowns, Flowers was named the American Athletic Conference Offensive Player of the Year and first-team All-Conference. Flowers also threw for 2,812 yards and 24 touchdowns with only seven interceptions. He ranked second nationally in ESPN's Total QBR statistic in 2016.

=== 2017 season ===
During his senior season in 2017, Flowers rushed for his second consecutive 1,000-yard season, becoming the first quarterback to do so in school history. He also passed for 2,911 yards and a career-high 27 touchdowns with six interceptions. He was also named first-team All-Conference for the second year in a row. Following the season, Flowers declared for the 2018 NFL draft.

In 2022, Flowers was inducted into the University of South Florida Athletic Hall of Fame. In school history, he ranks first in passing touchdowns (71), first in quarterback rating (146.5), first 1st in rushing attempts (598), first in rushing yards (3,672), first in rushing touchdowns (41), third in passing yards (8,124), third in interceptions (23), fourth in completions (565), and fourth in passing attempts (980). He also ranks ninth all-time in rushing yards for FBS quarterbacks. In his Hall of Fame speech, Flowers talked about his life growing up and the struggles with suicide and losing his family members.

== Professional career ==
Pre-draft measurables
Height	Weight	Arm length	Hand span	40-yard dash	10-yard split	20-yard split	20-yard shuttle	Three-cone drill	Broad jump
5 ft 10 3/8 in (1.79 m)	214 lb (97 kg)	30 7/8 in (0.78 m)	9 3/4 in (0.25 m)	4.63 s	1.56 s	2.70 s	4.35 s	6.81 s	9 ft 4 in (2.84 m)
All values from NFL Combine/Pro Day

=== Cincinnati Bengals ===
Flowers was signed by the Cincinnati Bengals as an undrafted free agent on May 11, 2018 as a running back. He was waived on September 1, 2018 and was signed to the practice squad the next day. He was promoted to the active roster on December 28, 2018.

Flowers was waived during final roster cuts on August 31, 2019.

=== Indianapolis Colts ===
On September 1, 2019, Flowers was signed to the Indianapolis Colts practice squad, but was released six days later.

=== Tampa Bay Vipers ===
Flowers was selected in the fifth round of phase one of the 2020 XFL draft by the Tampa Bay Vipers; although he was drafted as a running back, head coach Marc Trestman affirmed his intention to also play Flowers at quarterback.

Flowers left the team for personal reasons on February 26, 2020. He returned to the team on March 3, and requested to be traded. Flowers had his contract terminated when the league suspended operations on April 10. He finished the season with 106 passing yards, 78 rushing yards, a passing touchdown, and a rushing touchdown.

Flowers was selected by the Jousters of The Spring League during its player selection draft on October 12, 2020, but did not play with the league.

=== FCF Beasts ===
Flowers signed to play for the new Fan Controlled Football league for the 2021 season on January 12, 2021.

Flowers appeared in his debut for the Beasts in Week 1 of the 2021 season, throwing for a touchdown on his first play and scrambling for two further touchdowns as the Beasts beat the Zappers, 48–44. In Week 2, Flowers was franchise-tagged by the Beasts and played against the Wild Aces, though a majority of snaps were given to T.J. Edwards. Flowers once again threw for a touchdown on the first play of the game and rushed for two more touchdowns as the Beasts went on to win the game, 30–28.

In Week 3, Flowers led the Beasts to their third straight win against the Glacier Boyz, throwing a touchdown to recently franchise-tagged Troy Evans on the opening drive and rushing for a touchdown on the following drive. The Beasts, then trailing late in the second half with thirty seconds on the clock, were able to tie the game with a passing touchdown from Flowers to Christian Saulsberry, winning soon after with a successful onside conversion. In Week 4, the Beasts failed to finish the season undefeated. Flowers threw for one touchdown in the loss. Flowers led the league with 271 rushing yards and 6 rushing touchdowns.

In the first round of the playoffs, the Beasts faced the Glacier Boyz. Flowers finished the game with 26 rushing yards and 44 passing yards. The Beasts would go on to lose, 38–20.

=== Orlando Guardians ===
On March 6, 2023, Flowers signed with the Orlando Guardians of the XFL in replace of Quinten Dormady who was under league investigation. He joined a quarterback room containing former Denver Broncos first-round pick Paxton Lynch and another former FCF player in Deondre Francois.

In his first game, Flowers had two attempts to sneak the ball into the endzone from the two-yard line. His second attempt became his first touchdown of the season.

Flowers was removed from the roster after the 2023 season.

== Career statistics ==
=== Professional ===
Legend
	Led the league
**Bold**	Career high

XFL career statistics
Year	Team	Games			Passing								Rushing				Fumbles	
Year	Team	GP	GS	Record	Cmp	Att	Pct	Yds	Avg	TD	Int	Rtg	Att	Yds	Avg	TD	Fum	Lost
2020	TB	4	0	―	**8**	**15**	**53.3**	**106**	**7.1**	0	**1**	**48.2**	**16**	**78**	**4.9**	**1**	0	0
2023	ORL	1	0	―	0	0	–	0	–	0	0	–	2	2	1.0	**1**	0	0
Career		5	0	―	8	15	53.3	106	7.1	0	1	48.2	18	80	4.4	2	0	0

FCF career statistics
Year	Team	Games			Passing								Rushing				Fumbles	
Year	Team	GP	GS	Record	Cmp	Att	Pct	Yds	Avg	TD	Int	Rtg	Att	Yds	Avg	TD	Fum	Lost
2021	BEA	4	4	3–1	14	38	36.8	335	8.8	6	1	91.1	31	271	8.7	6	1	1
Career		4	4	3–1	14	38	36.8	335	8.8	6	1	91.1	31	269	8.7	6	1	1

=== College ===
Legend
	Led the NCAA (for quarterbacks)
	Led the AAC (for quarterbacks)
**Bold**	Career high

Year	Team	Games			Passing								Rushing			
Year	Team	GP	GS	Record	Cmp	Att	Pct	Yds	Avg	TD	Int	Rate	Att	Yds	Avg	TD
2014	South Florida	5	1	1–0	8	20	40.0	111	5.6	0	2	66.6	13	73	5.6	0
2015	South Florida	13	13	8–5	163	276	59.1	2,296	8.3	22	**8**	149.4	191	991	5.2	12
2016	South Florida	13	13	**11–2**	**207**	331	**62.5**	2,812	**8.5**	24	7	**153.6**	**198**	**1,530**	**7.7**	**18**
2017	South Florida	12	12	10–2	188	**354**	53.1	**2,911**	8.2	**25**	6	142.1	196	1,078	5.5	11
Career		43	39	30–9	566	981	57.7	8,130	8.3	71	23	146.5	598	3,672	6.1	41

== Accomplishments ==
NCAA awards and honors
Award	Ref.
2016 CFPA National Performer of the Year
2016 AAC Offensive Player of the Year
2016 Birmingham Bowl MVP
2017 Birmingham Bowl MVP
2016 First-team All-AAC
2017 Second-team All-AAC
2016 Week 2 Offensive Player of the Week
2016 Week 10 Offensive Player of the Week
2017 Week 10 Offensive Player of the Week
2016 CFPA National Performer of Week 9
2016 CFPA National Performer of Week 11
2017 CFPA National Performer of Week 10 Honorable Mention
2017 CFPA National Performer of Week 13 Honorable Mention

Note: These rankings are of NCAA, AAC, and USF records that are inside of the top ten.

AAC statistical rankings
Statistic	Rank	Value
Passing touchdowns	9th	71
Interceptions	3rd	23
Passer rating (min. 200 attempts)	8th	146.5
Rushing attempts	5th	598
Rushing yards	4th	3,672
Rushing touchdowns	2nd	41
Yards per rushing attempt (min. 100 attempts)	7th	6.1
Rushing attempts (for quarterbacks)	1st	598
Rushing yards (for quarterbacks)	1st	3,672
Rushing touchdowns (for quarterbacks)	1st	41
Yards per rushing attempt (for quarterbacks, min. 100 attempts)	1st	6.1

USF statistical rankings
Statistic	Rank	Value
Passing attempts	4th	980
Completions	4th	565
Completion percentage (min. 200 attempts)	4th	57.7
Passing yards	3rd	8,124
Passing touchdowns	1st	71
Interceptions	3rd	23
Passer rating (min. 200 attempts)	1st	146.5
Rushing attempts	1st	598
Rushing yards	1st	3,672
Rushing touchdowns	1st	41
Yards per rushing attempt (min. 100 attempts)	5th	6.1
Rushing attempts (for quarterbacks)	1st	598
Rushing yards (for quarterbacks)	1st	3,672
Rushing touchdowns (for quarterbacks)	1st	41
Yards per rushing attempt (for quarterbacks, min. 100 attempts)	1st	6.1

== Personal life ==
Flowers' father died in a drive-by shooting when Quinton was seven years old and his mother died of cancer in 2012. Just days prior to his first college career start in 2014, his stepbrother was shot and killed. Flowers has admitted that he considered taking his own life in 2016, after an aunt died. He has a wife, and one daughter.
