= Deondre Francois =

American football player (born 1997)

No. 12, 8
- Position: Quarterback

Personal information
- Born: February 12, 1997 (age 29); Miami, Florida, U.S.
- Listed height: 6 ft 1 in (1.85 m)
- Listed weight: 215 lb (98 kg)

Career information
- High school: Olympia (Orlando, Florida); IMG Academy (Bradenton, Florida)
- College: Florida State (2015–2018); Hampton (2019)
- NFL draft: 2020: undrafted

Career history
- FCF Glacier Boyz (2021); FCF Bored Ape Football Club (2022); Orlando Guardians (2023); DC Defenders (2024)

Awards and highlights
- FCF All-24 Team (2022); ACC Rookie of the Year (2016); ACC Offensive Rookie of the Year (2016)

Career AFL statistics
- Comp. / Att.: 48/92
- Passing yards: 767
- TD–INT: 19–3
- QB rating: 106.3
- Rushing TDs: 10

Deondre Francois (born February 12, 1997) is an American former football quarterback. He played college football for the Florida State Seminoles and Hampton Pirates. He also played for the Orlando Guardians and DC Defenders of the XFL.

== Early life ==
When Francois was a young child, he moved numerous times bouncing back and forth from Miami to Orlando. His mother Janice moved him and his family from Little Haiti, a neighborhood of Miami, to Orlando for a better life around the 4th grade. He first started playing football at the age of nine for the Orlando Outlaws with his godfather, Barry White.

Francois attended Olympia High School in Orlando, Florida, his first three years of high school and transferred to IMG Academy in Bradenton, Florida, his senior year. From 2012 to 2013 at Olympia, he passed for 3,162 yards and 29 touchdowns for the football team. As a senior, he passed for 1,488 yards with 18 touchdowns. Francois was considered a four-star recruit and committed to Florida State University to play college football.

=== High school statistics ===
Season	Team	Passing							Rushing		
Season	Team	Cmp	Att	Pct	Yds	TD	Int	Rtg	Att	Yds	TD
2011	Olympia	0	0	0.0	0	0	0	0.0	1	–4	0
2012	Olympia	135	230	58.7	1,789	10	7	n/a	45	–22	0
2013	Olympia	104	213	48.8	1,373	19	8	n/a	65	102	0
2014	IMG Academy	94	168	56.0	1,488	18	4	111.4	46	281	2
Career		333	611	54.5	4,650	47	19	n/a	157	357	2

== College career ==
=== Florida State (2015–2018) ===
Francois redshirted his first year at Florida State in 2015. Francois competed with Sean Maguire for the starting quarterback job in 2016. After Maguire suffered an injury, Francois was considered the favorite to start the season opener. On September 5, 2016, Francois made his first collegiate start against the Ole Miss Rebels. Francois passed for 419 yards and two touchdowns, leading the way on a 22-point comeback victory, the largest comeback in Florida State football history. He would be the starting quarterback for the rest of the season. The Seminoles finished the season 10–3, 5–3 in ACC play, to finish in second place in the Atlantic Division. They were invited to the 2016 Orange Bowl, where they defeated the Michigan Wolverines.

On September 2, 2017, in the Seminoles' first game of the year, Francois injured his patellar tendon, an injury which ended his season. He was 19–33 with 210 yards passing, one touchdown and two interceptions at time of his injury. The Seminoles went on to lose to Alabama, 24–7. Francois returned to the starting role in 2018. Francois finished the season with 2,731 passing yards on 396 attempts while completing 227 of them (57.3%) with 15 touchdowns to 12 interceptions.

==== Domestic abuse allegations ====
On February 3, 2019, it was announced that Francois had been removed from the Florida State football program after a video of a domestic dispute between him and his girlfriend surfaced on social media. On May 20, 2019, it was announced that Francois would attempt to walk-on at Florida Atlantic, however, this "never materialized."

=== Hampton (2019) ===
On August 2, 2019, it was announced that Francois had completed a graduate transfer to Hampton University and would be immediately eligible for the Pirates in the upcoming season.

=== College statistics ===
Season	Team	Games				Passing								Rushing		
Season	Team	GP	GS	Record	Cmp	Att	Pct	Yds	Avg	TD	Int	Rate	Att	Yds	Avg	TD
2015	Florida State	0	0	―	DNP											
2016	Florida State	13	13	10–3	235	400	58.8	3,350	8.4	20	7	142.1	108	198	1.8	5
2017	Florida State	1	1	0–1	19	33	57.6	210	6.4	1	2	108.9	9	−9	−1.0	0
2018	Florida State	11	11	5–6	227	396	57.3	2,731	6.9	15	12	121.7	78	16	0.2	3
2019	Hampton	12	12	5–7	205	361	56.8	2,522	7.0	26	14	131.5	64	148	2.3	4
Career		37	37	20–17	686	1,190	57.6	8,813	7.4	62	35	131.2	259	353	1.4	12

== Professional career ==
Pre-draft measurables
Height	Weight	Arm length	Hand span
6 ft 1 5/8 in (1.87 m)	203 lb (92 kg)	32 1/4 in (0.82 m)	9 5/8 in (0.24 m)
All values from Pro Day

=== FCF Glacier Boyz (2021) ===
In December 2020, Francois signed with Fan Controlled Football. Originally a member of the FCF Glacier Boyz, Francois joined the depth chart as the backup QB behind former UConn quarterback, David Pindell, and played in the first game of the season, completing three passes on five attempts for 36 yards and a single touchdown with nine yards rushing. The following week, Francois was drafted to the FCF Wild Aces and made his debut against the FCF Beasts, starting in front of Ed Couch. Francois threw only two passes the entire game, both ending in touchdowns for 40 yards in the 30–28 loss. In Week 4, Francois was drafted back to the Glacier Boyz and started against his former team, the Wild Aces, where he threw for an FCF-career-high 88 yards on six completions and two touchdowns in the 52–56 loss. He also rushed for one touchdown. In his first FCF playoff appearance, Francois threw five of eight for 91 yards for four touchdowns and rushed twice for 37 yards and a touchdown for a total of 5 touchdowns, leading the Glacier Boyz to the first-ever People's Championship appearance.

=== The Spring League (2021) ===
In 2021, Francois began his career in The Spring League, a developmental football league of eight teams, as the starting quarterback of the Blues of the South Division.

=== FCF Bored Ape FC (2022) ===
Francois was signed by the FCF in 2022 and was drafted by the Bored Ape Football Club as the first pick of Fan Controlled Football's "Season v2.0" inaugural draft. He started week one against the Knights of Degen, throwing 4–9 for 60 yards with a 44% completion rate and one touchdown and one interception. Francois was franchise tagged for week two by the Bored Ape Football Club.

=== Orlando Guardians (2023) ===
Francois was identified among nine quarterbacks training with Jordan Palmer for a potential quarterback position in the XFL in September 2022. On September 29, 2022, XFL Reporter Mike Mitchell reported that eight of the nine quarterbacks who worked with Palmer reportedly signed with each team. Francois was signed to the Orlando Guardians. Francois was a healthy scratch in the Guardians' opening game. The Guardians folded when the XFL and USFL merged to create the UFL.

=== DC Defenders (2024) ===
On January 5, 2024, Francois was selected by the DC Defenders during the 2024 UFL dispersal draft. He officially signed with the team on January 26. He was placed on Injured reserve on May 14.

Francois retired from professional football on October 7.

== Professional statistics ==
=== Regular season ===
Year	Team	Games			Passing								Rushing			
Year	Team	GP	GS	Record	Cmp	Att	Pct	Yds	Y/A	TD	Int	Rtg	Att	Yds	Avg	TD
Fan Controlled Football
2021	GBZ	4	0	―	20	31	64.5	307	9.9	10	2	109.8	10	123	12.3	3
2021	ACE	2	1	0–1	4	8	50.0	85	10.6	3	0	127.6	4	23	5.8	1
2022	BFC	9	9	6–3	24	53	45.3	375	7.1	6	1	99.2	31	226	7.3	6
Career		15	10	6–4	48	92	52.2	767	8.3	19	3	106.3	45	372	8.3	10
The Spring League
2021	Blues	6	0	―	25	44	56.8	243	5.5	1	1	70.5	5	41	8.2	0
Career		6	0	0–0	25	44	56.8	243	5.5	1	1	70.5	5	41	8.2	0
XFL
2023	ORL	4	0	―	10	22	45.5	47	2.1	2	1	44.0	7	27	3.9	0
Career		4	0	0–0	10	22	45.5	47	2.1	2	1	44.0	7	27	3.9	0
United Football League
2024	DC	0	0	―	0	0	–	0	–	0	0	–	0	0	–	0
Career		0	0	0–0	0	0	0.0	0	0.0	0	0	0.0	0	0	0.0	0
