= Martavis Bryant =

American football player (born 1991)

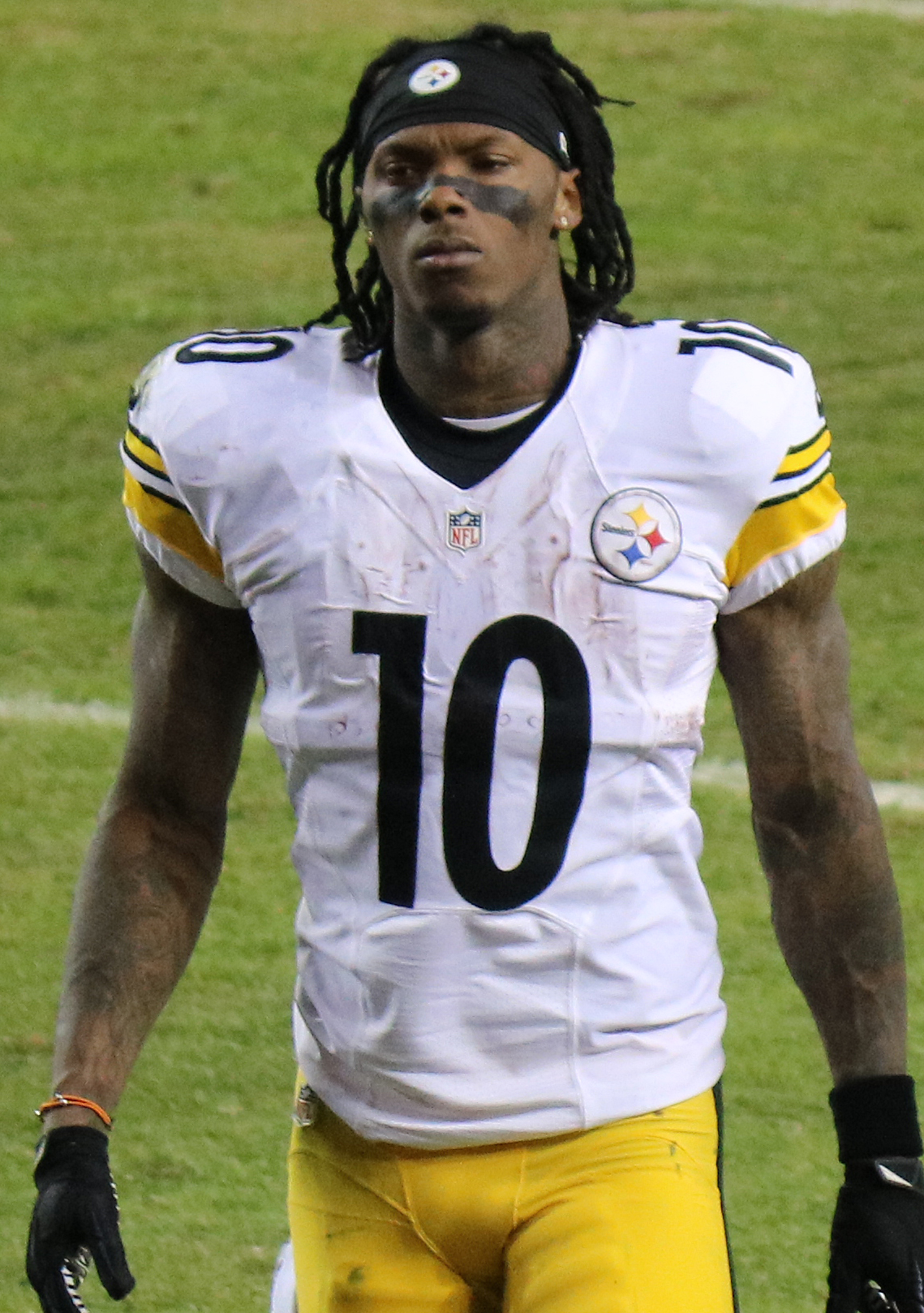
- Bryant with the Pittsburgh Steelers in 2016

No. 10, 12, 4
- Position: Wide receiver

Personal information
- Born: December 20, 1991 (age 34); Calhoun Falls, South Carolina, U.S.
- Listed height: 6 ft 4 in (1.93 m)
- Listed weight: 211 lb (96 kg)

Career information
- High school: T. L. Hanna (Anderson, South Carolina)
- College: Clemson (2011–2013)
- NFL draft: 2014: 4th round, 118th overall pick

Career history
- Pittsburgh Steelers (2014–2017); Oakland Raiders (2018); Toronto Argonauts (2021); Massachusetts Pirates (2021); Edmonton Elks (2022)*; FCF Beasts (2022); Vegas Vipers (2023); Dallas Cowboys (2023)*; Washington Commanders (2024)*
- * Offseason or practice squad member only

Career NFL statistics
- Receptions: 145
- Receiving yards: 2,183
- Rushing yards: 94
- Return yards: 151
- Total touchdowns: 18
- Stats at Pro Football Reference

Martavis Alexander Bryant (born December 20, 1991) is an American former professional football player who was a wide receiver in the National Football League (NFL). He played college football for the Clemson Tigers and was selected by the Pittsburgh Steelers in the fourth round of the 2014 NFL draft. Bryant was also a member of the NFL's Oakland Raiders, Dallas Cowboys, and Washington Commanders, the Toronto Argonauts and Edmonton Elks of the Canadian Football League (CFL), the Massachusetts Pirates of the Indoor Football League (IFL), the Beasts of Fan Controlled Football (FCF), and the Vegas Vipers of the XFL.

== Early life ==
Bryant was born in Calhoun Falls, South Carolina. In high school, Bryant was a standout football player for two schools. He attended Calhoun Falls High School in South Carolina and transferred to T. L. Hanna High School in Anderson, South Carolina, prior to his senior year because Calhoun Falls High was shut down due to low student numbers from a small town. He was named first-team all-state as a senior recording 70 receptions for 722 yards and 11 touchdowns. He had 44 catches for 776 yards and six touchdowns as a junior.

Considered a four-star recruit by Rivals.com, he was rated the 10th best wide receiver prospect in the nation. After high school, he spent one year at Hargrave Military Academy in Chatham, Virginia, to pass NCAA initial eligibility standards

As a standout sprinter, Bryant ran for the T. L. Hanna track team. He finished 2nd in the 100 meters at the Regional Class 1 AAAA championships, with a time of 10.85 seconds. He also won the 200 meters at the 2010 Region 1-4A Meet, recording a personal-best time of 21.46 seconds.

== College career ==
=== Freshman season ===
Bryant began attending Clemson University in 2011. Coming into Clemson, he had to compete with future NFL players, Sammy Watkins, DeAndre Hopkins, and Jaron Brown. His first reception was for 54 yards against Troy on September 3. The next week, he had his first career touchdown, a 42-yard reception while playing Wofford. His first career start was against No. 10 Virginia Tech on October 1, 2011. He also played in his first bowl game, against No. 22 West Virginia in the Orange Bowl. In that game, he caught two passes for 20 yards. He completed his first season with two starts in 14 games. He finished 2011 with nine receptions, 220 receiving yards, and two touchdowns.

=== Sophomore season ===
After his first season, Bryant's production increased. Against Ball State, he had a 22-yard touchdown catch, a 17-yard carry, and three kickoff returns for 69 yards. He finished the game leading the Tigers with 108 all-purpose yards. For the season, he showed little improvement, having career highs with 10 receptions, 305 receiving yards, and 4 touchdown catches. He led the entire FBS with 30.5 yards per reception.

=== Junior season ===
His junior season was his best year in college. While playing against No. 5 Georgia, he recovered the game winning onside kick. Against North Carolina State, he had 6 receptions for 73 yards. On November 14, against Georgia Tech, he had a career-high 176 receiving yards, on five catches, for one touchdown. In his second Orange Bowl against No. 6 Ohio State he had three catches, 28 receiving yards, and two touchdowns, marking a career-high. He finished 2013 with 42 receptions, 828 receiving yards, and seven touchdown receptions making his career totals, 61 receptions, 1,354 receiving yards, and 13 touchdowns.

Bryant announced on January 5, 2014, that he would forgo his senior season and enter the 2014 NFL draft.

== Professional career ==
=== Pre-draft ===
Coming out of Clemson, Bryant was projected to be drafted anywhere from the second to fourth round by the majority of NFL analysts and scouts. Bryant received an invitation to the NFL Combine and completed all the required combine drills and positional drills for team representatives and scouts. On March 6, 2014, he participated at Clemson's Pro Day and chose to only perform positional drills. He was ranked as the 14th best wide receiver prospect available in the draft by NFLDraftScout.com and was ranked the 13th best wide receiver by NFL analyst Mike Mayock.

Pre-draft measurables
Height	Weight	Arm length	Hand span	40-yard dash	10-yard split	20-yard split	20-yard shuttle	Three-cone drill	Vertical jump	Broad jump	Bench press	Wonderlic
6 ft 3 3/4 in (1.92 m)	211 lb (96 kg)	32 5/8 in (0.83 m)	9 1/2 in (0.24 m)	4.42 s	1.57 s	2.57 s	4.15 s	7.18 s	39 in (0.99 m)	10 ft 4 in (3.15 m)	16 reps	14
All values from NFL Combine

=== Pittsburgh Steelers ===
==== 2014 season ====
The Pittsburgh Steelers selected Bryant in the fourth round (118th overall) of the 2014 NFL draft. He was the 19th wide receiver selected. On June 9, 2014, he signed a four-year contract with the team worth $2.659 million, with $439,220 guaranteed and a $439,220 signing bonus.

Bryant spent the first six weeks of the season inactive, due to a shaky training camp and preseason, in addition to suffering a mild A/C sprain in the last preseason game. Head coach Mike Tomlin told Bryant he wanted to see him dominate the scout team in practice before he would activate him for a game. Bryant was finally activated for a Week 7 matchup against the Houston Texans. His first NFL reception went for a 35-yard touchdown, and he finished the game with two catches for 40 yards. On October 26, he hauled in a season-high five catches for 83 yards with two touchdowns in a 51–34 victory over the Indianapolis Colts. On November 2, Bryant received his first career start against the Baltimore Ravens, ending the game with three receptions, 44 receiving yards, and two touchdown receptions. His five touchdown receptions set an NFL record for a player in their first three games. During a Week 10 contest against the New York Jets, Martavis had four receptions for a season-high 143 yards, and had an 80-yard touchdown catch. This marked his sixth touchdown in his first four games, and again set an NFL record (which was later tied by Calvin Ridley.)

On December 28, Bryant caught a 21-yard touchdown reception in a 27–17 win over the Cincinnati Bengals. He played in his first NFL postseason game on January 3, 2015, against the Ravens. He finished with five receptions for 61 yards and a touchdown in a 17–30 loss.

Bryant finished his rookie season with 26 receptions for 549 receiving yards and eight touchdowns, in ten games with three starts. Bryant's 21.1 yards-per-reception ranked first among NFL wide receivers in 2014.

==== 2015 season ====
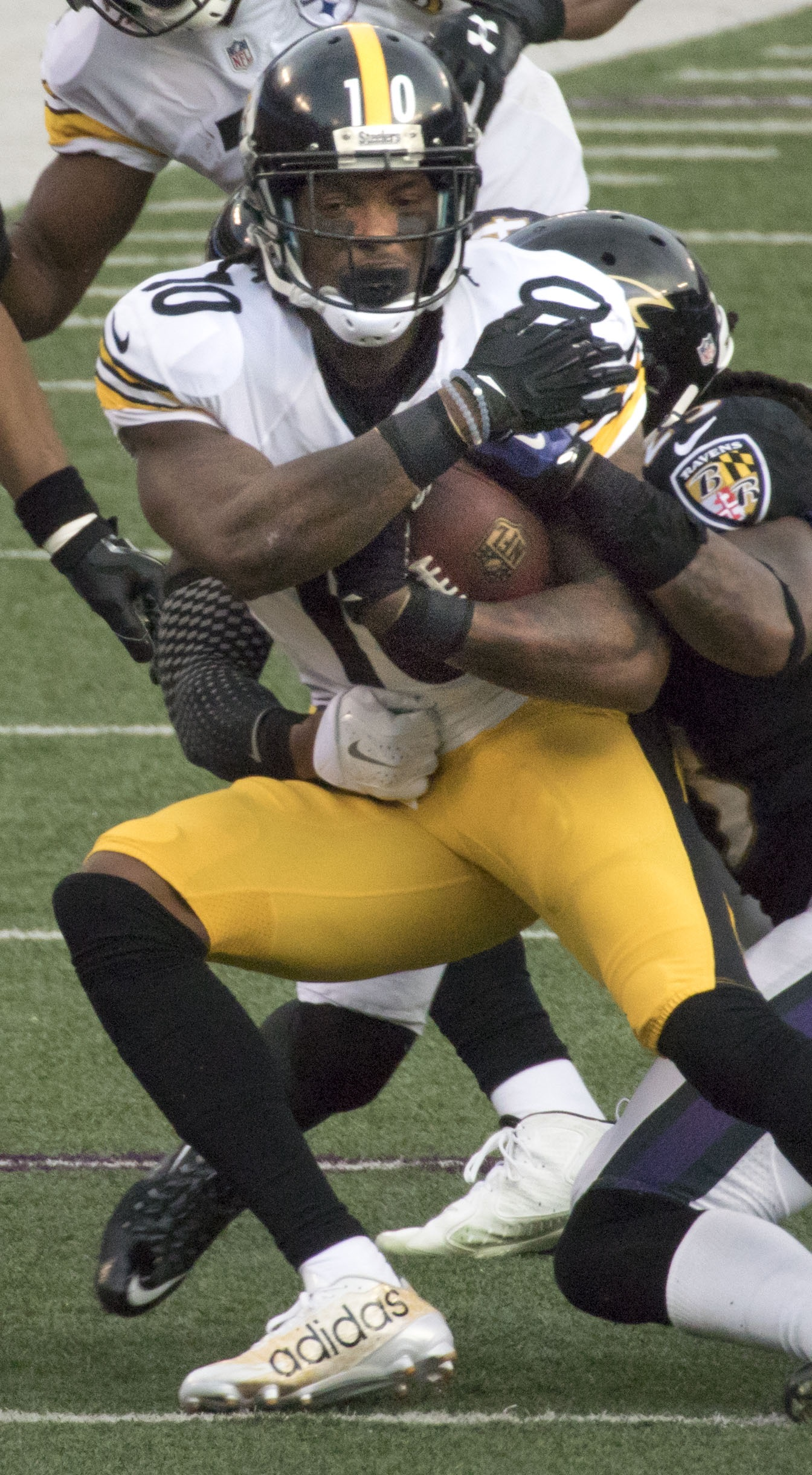
Bryant with the Steelers in 2015

On August 27, 2015, Bryant was suspended the first four games due to violating the league's substance abuse policy. During his suspension, he spent time at a rehabilitation center in Houston, Texas, and worked with ex-NBA coach John Lucas. Although he was available to return for Week 5, he missed the game due to a knee injury, so he made his season debut on October 18. In a 25–13 victory over the Arizona Cardinals, he caught six passes for 137 yards and two touchdowns, including an 88-yard touchdown. His first start of the season was on October 25 against the Kansas City Chiefs, where he caught three receptions for 45 yards and a touchdown. During a Week 10 matchup against the Cleveland Browns, Bryant had a season-high 178 receiving yards on six catches, while also scoring a 64-yard touchdown. On December 13, he caught a season-high seven receptions for 49 yards, in a 33–20 victory over the Bengals. In Week 15, he made a season-high ten catches for 87 yards in a 34–27 win over the Denver Broncos. This was the first time in his career that he caught over nine passes in a single game.

On January 9, 2016, against the Bengals in the Wild Card Round, while in the red zone, quarterback Ben Roethlisberger threw a pass into the corner of the end zone, which was intended for Bryant. During the process of the catch, he did a front flip and maintained control of the ball while holding it on the back of his leg throughout the flip. The NFL VP of officiating later deemed this should not have been ruled a catch. This score gave the Steelers a 15–0 lead en route to winning the game by a score of 18–16. In the Divisional Round against the Broncos, Bryant made nine receptions for 154 yards, while rushing for 40 yards, in a 23–16 defeat.

==== 2016 season ====
On March 14, 2016, the NFL announced it had suspended Bryant for the entire 2016 NFL season for again violating the league's substance abuse policy.

==== 2017 season ====
On April 25, 2017, Bryant was conditionally reinstated by the NFL. He entered the regular season as the starting wide receiver alongside Antonio Brown. In the Steelers' season-opening victory against the Browns, Bryant caught two passes for 14 yards. The following week, he caught three passes for 91 receiving yards and his first touchdown of the season on a 27-yard pass from Ben Roethlisberger as the Steelers defeated the Minnesota Vikings 26–9. However, following the Week 7 game against the Bengals, Bryant vented frustration about his lack of role in the offense on social media, and then skipped mandatory team meetings the following Monday. Bryant then publicly told ESPN he would like to be traded; however, coach Mike Tomlin said the team had no plans to trade Bryant. On October 25, 2017, prior to that week's game against the Detroit Lions, the Steelers demoted Bryant to the scout team and replaced him with JuJu Smith-Schuster after deactivating him for the game. As of November 1, 2017, Bryant was promoted back onto the first-team for the following game against the Colts.

Bryant finished the 2017 season with 50 receptions for 603 yards and three touchdowns. The Steelers made the playoffs and faced off against the Jacksonville Jaguars in the Divisional Round. In the 45–42 loss, he had two receptions for 78 yards and a touchdown.

=== Oakland Raiders ===
On April 26, 2018, the Steelers traded Bryant to the Oakland Raiders for Oakland's third round pick previously acquired from the Cardinals (79th overall) in the 2018 NFL draft.

On September 1, 2018, Bryant was released by the Raiders. Despite facing a possible year-long suspension by the NFL for a violation of the league's drug policy during the off-season, the Raiders re-signed him to a one-year deal ten days later. He played in eight games, recording 19 catches for 266 yards and no touchdowns, before being placed on injured reserve on December 5, 2018, with a knee injury. On December 14, 2018, the NFL suspended Bryant indefinitely for violating the terms of his conditional reinstatement. Bryant applied for reinstatement in 2019.

=== Toronto Argonauts ===
On January 25, 2021, Bryant signed with the Toronto Argonauts of the Canadian Football League (CFL). He was placed on the suspended list on July 10, 2021, after failing to report for training camp. Bryant never played for the Argonauts and after the season he was released on December 23, 2021.

=== Massachusetts Pirates ===
On April 2, 2021, Bryant signed with the Massachusetts Pirates of the Indoor Football League.

=== Edmonton Elks ===
The Edmonton Elks of the CFL announced that they had signed Bryant on February 28, 2022. Bryant was released by the Elks on May 3, 2022, before training camp began.

=== Fan Controlled Football ===
On April 29, 2022, the FCF Beasts recruited Bryant to the team.

=== Vegas Vipers ===
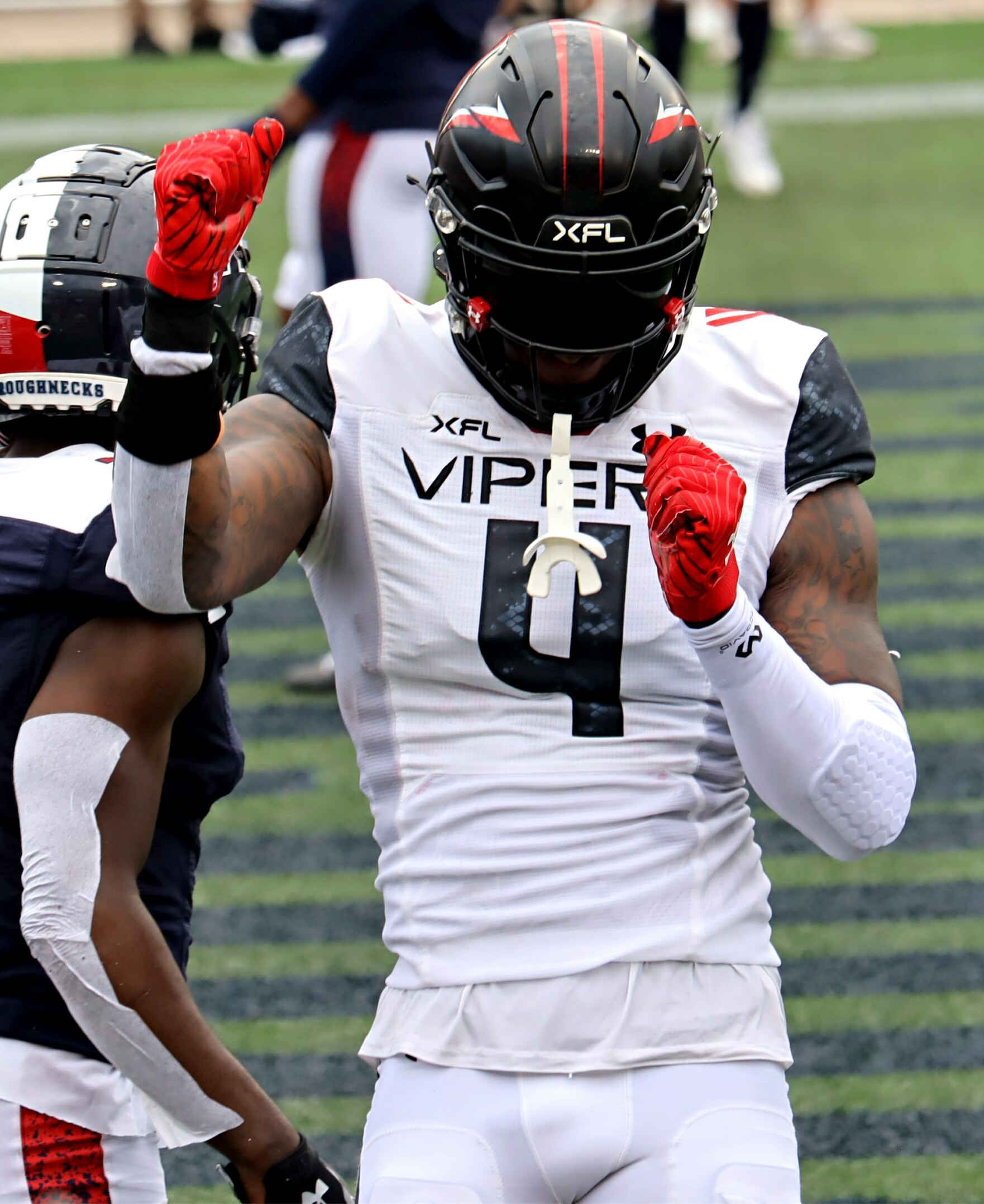
Bryant with the Vegas Vipers in 2023

Bryant was selected by the Vegas Vipers of the XFL with the 5th pick in the 2023 XFL Skill Players Draft. He played in eight games, starting six, for the Vipers in 2023, catching 14 passes for 154 yards. He was released on November 7, 2023, allowing him to sign with the Dallas Cowboys.

=== Dallas Cowboys ===
On November 7, 2023, the Dallas Cowboys signed Bryant to their practice squad. He was released on January 4, 2024. Bryant signed a reserve/future contract with the team on January 17. On May 8, the Cowboys released Bryant.

=== Washington Commanders ===
Bryant signed with the Washington Commanders on August 13, 2024. He was released on August 27.

== Career statistics ==
Legend
	Led the league
**Bold**	Career high

=== NFL ===
Regular season statistics
Year	Team	Games		Receiving					Rushing					Returning					Fumbles	
Year	Team	GP	GS	Rec	Yds	Avg	Lng	TD	Att	Yds	Avg	Lng	TD	Ret	Yds	Avg	Lng	TD	Fum	Lost
2014	PIT	10	3	26	549	**21.1**	**94T**	**8**	3	12	4.0	9	0	0	0	0.0	0	0	0	0
2015	PIT	11	5	**50**	**765**	15.3	88T	6	5	**37**	7.4	13	**1**	0	0	0.0	0	0	**1**	0
2016	PIT	0	0	Suspended																
2017	PIT	15	8	**50**	603	12.1	51	3	**6**	22	3.7	13	0	**9**	**151**	**16.8**	**38**	0	0	0
2018	OAK	8	2	19	266	14.0	47	0	3	23	**7.7**	**17**	0	0	0	0.0	0	0	**1**	0
Career		44	18	145	2,183	15.1	94T	17	17	94	5.5	17	1	9	151	16.8	38	0	2	1

Postseason statistics
Year	Team	Games		Receiving					Rushing					Returning					Fumbles	
Year	Team	GP	GS	Rec	Yds	Avg	Lng	TD	Att	Yds	Avg	Lng	TD	Ret	Yds	Avg	Lng	TD	Fum	Lost
2014	PIT	1	0	5	61	12.2	22	**1**	1	6	6.0	6	0	0	0	0.0	0	0	0	0
2015	PIT	2	2	**14**	**183**	13.1	**52**	**1**	**3**	**84**	**28.0**	**44**	0	0	0	0.0	0	0	0	0
2017	PIT	1	0	2	78	**39.0**	42	**1**	0	0	0.0	0	0	0	0	0.0	0	0	0	0
Career		4	2	21	322	15.3	52	3	4	90	22.5	44	0	0	0	0.0	0	0	0	0

=== Other leagues ===
FCF
Year	Team	GP	Receiving					Rushing				
Year	Team	GP	Rec	Yds	Avg	Lng	TD	Att	Yds	Avg	Lng	TD
2022	BEA	4	8	93	11.6	29	2	2	8	4.0	9	0

== Personal life ==
Clemson began recruiting Bryant when he was a freshman in high school. He verbally committed to them during his second year of high school. He also has amassed many tattoos including the NFL shield logo on his abdomen to remind him he was selected in the fourth round and to keep himself motivated. His cousin is former Clemson quarterback and former Toronto Argonauts teammate Kelly Bryant.
