= T. J. Weist =

American football coach (born 1965)

New York Giants
- Title: Special teams assistant

Personal information
- Born: June 25, 1965 (age 61); Bay City, Michigan, U.S.

Career information
- High school: All Saints Central (Bay City)
- College: Alabama

Career history
- Alabama (1988–1989) Graduate assistant & wide receivers coach; Michigan (1990–1993) Wide receivers coach; Southern Illinois (1994–1995) Wide receivers coach & tight ends coach; Tulsa (1996) Wide receivers coach; Indiana (1997–2001) Wide receivers coach; Western Kentucky (2002–2009) Offensive coordinator & associate head coach; Cincinnati (2010–2012) Wide receivers coach; Connecticut (2013) Offensive coordinator; Connecticut (2013) Interim head coach; Michigan (2015) Offensive analyst; South Florida (2016) Offensive coordinator & wide receivers coach; Baltimore Ravens (2018) Offensive analyst; Baltimore Ravens (2019–2025) Special teams assistant; New York Giants (2026–present) Special teams assistant

Head coaching record
- Career: 4–5 (college)

T. J. Weist (pronounced WEEST, born June 25, 1965) is an American football coach who is an assistant special teams coach for the New York Giants of the National Football League (NFL). He was the Offensive Coordinator at USF in 2016 and named interim head coach for the 2016 Birmingham Bowl, leading the Bulls to a victory over South Carolina in overtime. He was the senior offensive analyst for University of Michigan in 2015 and interim head coach of the Connecticut Huskies football team for the 2013 season.

Weist, has mentored over 27 future National Football League (NFL) receivers, was also the recruiting coordinator at Cincinnati and Indiana. He also has been on staffs at Cincinnati (2009-12), Western Kentucky (2002-09) winning the 1AA National Championship under Jack Harbaugh, Indiana (1997-01), Tulsa (1996), Southern Illinois (1994–95), Michigan (1990–93) and Alabama (1988–89). The Wolverines reached four postseason bowl games during his tenure, including two Rose Bowl appearances, where he coached Heisman Trophy winner Desmond Howard. While the Crimson Tide appeared in a pair of postseason contests while he was on the coaching staff including the 1990 Sugar Bowl. [2]

== Early life ==
A native of Bay City, Michigan, Weist enrolled at Alabama, where he was a letterman, as a wide receiver under head coaches Ray Perkins and Bill Curry. In 1988, he received a B.S in health and physical education, then finished his education a year later, receiving a M.S. in exercise physiology.

== Coaching career ==
=== Alabama ===
Weist started his coaching career as a GA after playing WR for the Crimson Tide. The Tide went to the Sun Bowl after the 88 season and won the SEC and played Miami in the 1990 Sugar Bowl for the National Championship.

=== Michigan ===
Weist then moved on to Michigan where he coached the WR’s for 4 years under Coach Gary Moeller. He coached in 4 bowl games including the 1992 and 93 Rose Bowls. He coached 7 future NFL WR’s while at UM, including Desmond Howard, the 1991 Heisman Trophy winner.

=== Tulsa ===
Weist coached the WR’s for David Rader at Tulsa in 1996, including a win at Oklahoma.

=== Indiana ===
Weist then moved to Indiana where he coached special teams, and also served as the Hoosiers' recruiting coordinator.

=== Western Kentucky ===
Weist was hired at Western Kentucky serving under head coach Jack Harbaugh. Winning the 1AA national Championship for the 2002 season. During his time at WKU he coached the wide receivers and also served as the team's assistant head coach (2007–09) and offensive coordinator (2003–06). As offensive coordinator in 2006, WKU ranked 23rd in the country in total offense, also finishing 17th in pass efficiency rating while posting more than 4,000 total yards for the fifth consecutive season. Weist helped direct an offense that averaged 405.73 yards per game in 2005, while scoring more than 30 points a game. The Hilltoppers ranked in the top 30 nationally in four different categories.

=== Cincinnati ===
In 2010 Weist joined Butch Jones staff at Cincinnati as wide receivers coach. Weist coached a pair of All-Big East Conference selections in Armon Binns (first team) and D. J. Woods (second team) as the duo were the No. 1 and 2 ranked receivers in the Big East in 2010. The Bearcats were the only NCAA FBS school to have two wide receivers with 15 or more 20-yard receptions in 2010. In 2010, the Bearcats led the Big East in scoring offense (27.1 ppg), total offense (417.3 ypg) and passing offense (260.7 ypg).

In 2011, Cincinnati averaged 385 yards of total offense per game and scored an average of 33.3 points per game on the way to a Big East conference championship and a win in the Liberty Bowl over Vanderbilt.

Weist helped lead the Bearcats to a 10–3 record in 2012 and a 48-34 victory over Duke in the Belk Bowl. Weist served as Cincinnati's offensive coordinator in the Belk Bowl as the Bearcats gained 554 yards of total offense on 53 plays and did not have a turnover. Cincinnati was 17 of 25 in passing for 332 yards. Cincinnati was ranked second in the Big East in total offense at 440.23 yards per game and was first in the Big East in scoring offense at 32.31 points per game. During his time with the Bearcats, Cincinnati won a total of two Big East championships.

=== Connecticut ===
Weist was hired as offensive coordinator and wide receivers coach at UConn before the 2013 season. On September 30, 2013, two days after losing to Buffalo 41–12, Weist was named interim head coach, replacing Paul Pasqualoni who had been fired earlier in the day. His first game as head coach was a 13-10 loss to South Florida. Weist was able to salvage the huskies 2013 season by leading the team to wins over Temple, Rutgers, and Memphis.

=== Michigan ===
Michigan head coach Jim Harbaugh hired Weist in 2015 to be Michigan's senior offensive analyst.

=== South Florida ===
On January 26, 2016 South Florida head coach Willie Taggart name Weist offensive coordinator and wide receivers coach. At the end of the 2016 season Taggart left South Florida to take the head coaching job at Oregon and Weist was named interim head coach for the 2016 Birmingham Bowl. South Florida knocked off South Carolina 46-39 in overtime.

=== Baltimore Ravens ===
In 2018, the Baltimore Ravens hired Weist as an offensive analyst under head coach John Harbaugh.

=== New York Giants ===
On February 13, 2026, the New York Giants hired Weist to serve as a special teams assistant as part of Harbaugh's inaugural coaching staff.

== Personal life ==
Weist has a wife Karen. Together, they have a son James, and twin daughters Samantha and Karrington.

== Head coaching record ==
Year	Team	Overall	Conference	Standing	Bowl/playoffs	Coaches^{#}	AP^{°}
UConn Huskies (American Athletic Conference) (2013)
2013	UConn	3–5	3–5	T–6th			
UConn:		3–5	3–5				
South Florida Bulls (American Athletic Conference) (2016)
2016	South Florida	1–0			W Birmingham	19	19
South Florida:		1–0	0–0				
Total:		4–5					
^{#}Rankings from final Coaches Poll.; ^{°}Rankings from final AP Poll.
