= 2016 Birmingham Bowl =

- 11th Birmingham Bowl
South Florida Bulls	South Carolina Gamecocks
(10–2)	(6–6)
The American	SEC
46	39
Head coach: T. J. Weist (interim)	Head coach: Will Muschamp
AP / Coaches; 25 / 22
	1	2	3	4	OT	Total
South Florida	15	14	10	0	7	46
South Carolina	0	14	10	15	0	39
- Date: December 29, 2016
- Season: 2016
- Stadium: Legion Field
- Location: Birmingham, Alabama
- MVP: Quinton Flowers
- Favorite: South Florida by 10.5
- Referee: David Alvarez (Mountain West)
- Attendance: 31,229
- Payout: US$1,100,000 (SEC) $900,000(AAC)

United States TV coverage
- Network: ESPN/ESPN Radio
- Announcers: TV: Eamon McAnaney, John Congemi, Kevin Weidl; Radio: Doug Bell, Chris Doering, Kris Budden

The 2016 Birmingham Bowl was a college football bowl game played on December 29, 2016 at Legion Field in Birmingham, Alabama in the United States. The eleventh annual Birmingham Bowl featured the South Florida Bulls from the American Athletic Conference against the South Carolina Gamecocks from the Southeastern Conference. It was one of the 2016–17 bowl games concluding the 2016 FBS football season.

== Game summary ==
=== Scoring summary ===
Scoring summary

Quarter	Time	Drive			Team	Scoring information	Score	
Quarter	Time	Plays	Yards	TOP	Team	Scoring information	USF	SC
1	10:25	7	46	2:26	USF	Quinton Flowers 4-yard touchdown run, 2-point pass good	8	0
1	4:26	11	80	4:09	USF	Flowers 4-yard touchdown run, Brandon Behr kick good	15	0
2	14:02	4	81	1:14	SC	Hayden Hurst 25-yard touchdown reception from Jake Bentley, Elliott Fry kick good	15	7
2	10:40	10	77	3:22	USF	Flowers 1-yard touchdown run, Behr kick good	22	7
2	1:12	10	73	4:26	SC	Deebo Samuel 3-yard touchdown reception from Bentley, Fry kick good	22	14
2	0:07	8	68	1:05	USF	D'Ernest Johnson 37-yard touchdown reception from Flowers, Behr kick good	29	14
3	11:55	8	65	3:05	SC	Samuel 4-yard touchdown run, Fry kick good	29	21
3	8:07	11	60	3:48	USF	21-yard field goal by Behr	32	21
3	7:06	3	−7	1:01	USF	Interception returned 47 yards for touchdown by Tajee Fullwood, Behr kick good	39	21
3	0:22	4	2	1:32	SC	43-yard field goal by Fry	39	24
4	9:41	9	77	4:14	SC	Bryan Edwards 9-yard touchdown reception from Bentley, Fry kick good	39	31
4	1:11	3	2	1:34	SC	A.J. Turner 4-yard touchdown run, 2-point pass good	39	39
OT		1	25		USF	Elkanah Dillon 25-yard touchdown reception from Flowers, Behr kick good	46	39
"TOP" = time of possession. For other American football terms, see Glossary of American football.							46	39
