= 2021 Fan Controlled Football season =

- League: Fan Controlled Football
- Sport: Indoor American football
- Hosts: Infinite Energy Arena
- Duration: February 13 – March 20, 2021
- Games: 11
- Teams: 4
- TV partner(s): Twitch, VENN, FTF (replays)

Regular season
- Season champions: Beasts (3–1)
- Runners-up: Wild Aces (2–2)

Playoffs
- Game 1 champions: Glacier Boyz
- Game 1 runners-up: Beasts
- Game 2 champions: Wild Aces
- Game 2 runners-up: Zappers

The People's Championship v1.0
- Venue: Infinite Energy Arena
- Champions: Wild Aces
- Runners-up: Glacier Boyz
- Gatorade Finals MVP: Ed Crouch

FCF seasons
- 2022

The 2021 Fan Controlled Football season was the first season of the Fan Controlled Football (FCF), a professional indoor football league.

The league began play on February 13, 2021, with four teams competing in a 12-game-format over six weeks. The league used Internet streaming as its main television platform and is streamed on Twitch and VENN on Saturdays, with reruns on FTF; the league championship is carried on the digital subchannel network LX. The FCF saw a steady increase in its viewership through its first five weeks, from 735,000 in the first week to 2.1 million in the playoffs.

Following a four-game season where the Beasts took home the regular season championship, the playoffs concluded with the #1 seed Beasts losing to the #4 seed Glacier Boyz in an upset and #2 seed Wild Aces easily defeating the #3 seed Zappers. The Wild Aces beat the Glacier Boyz 46–40 in the final, and were named the People's Championship, as voted by the fans, on March 20, 2021.

Players were paid weekly minimum of $400 to $750 plus room and board, while coaches got paid $3,500 per month with housing and meal plan.

== Background ==
The FCF, which sees itself as "Esports and traditional sports colliding together" is unique because the league leans heavily on fan interaction to make important decisions, such as play-calling, drafts, rules, team names and seasonal awards. Voting is done through a mobile app, a concept the owners first tested in the Indoor Football League when they owned the Salt Lake Screaming Eagles, and later giving up ownership of the team when they started the FCF.

The Fan Controlled Football League's (FCFL) first season's initial start date was set for 2018 but was postponed. It was then slated to start in summer 2020 in Las Vegas with eight teams, but was postponed due to the COVID-19 pandemic. The league shortened its name to Fan Controlled Football (FCF) and announced it would play with four teams in February 2021 in a bubble environment at the Infinite Energy Arena in Duluth, Georgia. FCF thus became the third different high-profile professional football league to play in the weeks immediately following the Super Bowl in as many years, following the Alliance of American Football in 2019 and the XFL in 2020; FCF was the first of those to complete its inaugural season as scheduled.

== Teams ==
The 2021 season was originally said to have eight teams, which was reduced to four due to the COVID-19 pandemic. All teams have no geographic location that they are based in, similar to ESports teams. All teams share position coaches, doctors and trainers, marketing staffs and practice squad.

=== 2021 Beasts season ===
2021 Beasts season
- Owner: Marshawn Lynch; Miroslav Barnyashev; Renee Montgomery

Results
- Record: 3–1
- League place: 1st
- Playoff finish: Lost Semifinals (vs. Zappers)

The Beasts won their first franchise game 48–44 against the Zappers and former Heisman winner Johnny Manziel on February 13, 2021.

On March 5, 2021, to load up for the Playoffs, The Beasts signed Robert Turbin, a former teammate of team owner, Marshawn Lynch.

The Beasts finished the regular season 3–1, securing the #1 seed in the playoffs, but ultimately ended up losing to the #4 seed Glacier Boyz 38–20 in the semi-finals, Finishing the 2021 Fan Controlled Football season 3–2.

=== 2021 Glacier Boyz season ===
2021 Glacier Boyz season
- Owner: Quavious Marshall; Adin Ross; Richard Sherman

Results
- Record: 1–3
- League place: 4th
- Playoff finish: Lost Finals (vs. Wild Aces)

=== 2021 Wild Aces season ===
2021 Wild Aces season
- Owner: Greg Miller; Rachel Lindsay; Austin Ekeler

Results
- Record: 2–2
- League place: 2nd
- Playoff finish: Won Finals (vs. Glacier Boyz)

The Wild Aces won their first franchise game, 30–22, against the Glacier Boyz on February 13, 2021. The Aces finished the season 2–2 and earned 2nd place in the league's regular season standings. Their week two franchise-tagged super back LaDarius Galloway was given the regular season Offensive MVP and Joseph Putu was given the Defensive MVP. They ultimately ended up winning against the No. 3 seeded Zappers, 32–6, in the semi-finals, advancing to The People's Championship.

Right before the game, it was revealed that former Baylor and XFL defensive end Shawn Oakman had signed with the Wild Aces. The Wild Aces won the People's Championship v1.0 game against the No. 4 seeded Glacier Boyz, 46–40, finishing the 2021 Fan Controlled Football season, 4–2, and earning their first championship in franchise history. Dual-threat quarterback Ed Crouch was named People's Championship Gatorade MVP. Crouch went 4 for 9 with 72 yards and 1 passing touchdown. He also rushed 6 times for 53 yards and added a rushing touchdown. His rushing touchdown came on the last play of the game where he faked a run to Galloway and outran a defender to touch the pilon with no time left on the clock.

==== Final roster ====
Wild Aces roster
Quarterbacks: 5 Ed Crouch; 8 Jackson Erdmann; Super backs: 20 Berkley Edwards; 37 LaDarius Galloway; 39 Daryl Virgies; Wide receivers: 1 James Harden; 16 Douglas McNeil; 17 Richaud Floyd; 27 Raphael Leonard; Tight ends: 41 David Meza; 43 Elkanah Dillon; 85 Jeremiah Houston	Offensive linemen: 61 Justin Brown C; 66 Lawrence Keys C; 71 Kamalie Matthews T; 74 Patrick Allen C; 79 D'Marcus Hayes T; Defense: 26 Benjamin Hunt IV CB; 29 Dillon Winfrey CB; 32 Darreon Jackson S; 36 Karheem Darrington CB; 46 Joseph Putu CB; 47 James Gales Jr. S; 50 Max Davis LB; 55 Fredrick Conyers LB; 56 Jeremiah Dadeboe LB; 67 Clavacia Love DE; 91 Dakavian Champion DT; 92 James Lee DE; 93 Travonte Valentine DT; 94 Shawn Oakman DE; 95 Kyle Kitchens DE; 96 Joe Tito DE; 97 Owen Obasuyi DE	Keepers: 8 Jackson Erdmann; 17 Richaud Floyd; 27 Raphael Leonard; 37 Ladarius Galloway; 46 Joseph Putu; Rookies in italics Roster updated September 28, 2022 25 active, 0 inactive, 0 practice squad, 0 unsigned → Fan Controlled Football

=== 2021 Zappers season ===
2021 Zappers season
- Owner: Bob Menery; Trevor May; Ronnie Singh

Results
- Record: 2–2
- League place: 3rd
- Playoff finish: Lost Semifinals (vs. Glacier Boyz)

On December 30, 2020, It was announced that former Heisman Trophy winner Johnny Manziel had signed with the Zappers.

The Zappers lost their first franchise game 48–44 against the Beasts on February 13, 2021.

On February 27, 2021, it was announced that Josh Gordon had signed with the Zappers after being suspended indefinitely by the NFL.

The Beasts finished the regular season 2–2, securing the #2 seed in the playoffs, but ultimately lost to the #2 seed Wild Aces 32–6 in the semifinals, finishing the 2021 Fan Controlled Football season 2–3.

== Players ==
The FCF started its combines and scouting for players as early as January 2019, starting originally with asking fans to recommend players and then later holding combines in Atlanta, Dallas, Columbus and then Las Vegas. Following the cancellation of the Summer 2020 season, the league held further combines in October 2020 in Houston and Pittsburgh then another in Atlanta in November 2020. In December 2020, the FCF signed former Heisman trophy winner and NFL first round pick, quarterback Johnny Manziel and Florida State quarterback Deondre Francois. They also signed former NFL player Quinn Porter, Douglas McNeil III, Jeremiah Poutasi and former XFL players Damon Sheehy-Guiseppi and Quinton Flowers.

The league has no set teams with all players being drafted to teams before the first week of the season. This draft is done via voting by fans in the FCF app. The same is done every week until the playoffs. To stop a player from being drafted by other teams, fans can vote on using a "franchise tag" which will permanently attach the player to the team for the entire season. Players can be selected by their own team in the draft to stop them from being drafted by another team.

Josh Gordon signed with the FCF on March 6, 2021 after being released by the Seattle Seahawks, entering the bubble soon after to appear in Week 4 as his FCF debut with the Zappers. Robert Turbin also signed at the same time though entered the bubble later, making his debut appearance for the Beasts in the playoffs.

2021 Fan Controlled Football final roster
Quarterbacks Ed Crouch T.J. Edwards II Jackson Erdmann Quinton Flowers Deondre Francois Johnny Manziel Logan Marchi David Pindell Braden Smith Running backs . Calen Campbell Berkley Edwards LaDarius Galloway Madre London Quinn Porter Ben Sieczkowski Robert Turbin Daryl Virgies Wide receivers . Joseph Boykin LaMarcus Cardine Alphonso Carter Troy Evans Jr. Richaud Floyd Josh Gordon James Harden Treydonte Hill Andrew Jamiel Joshua Johnson Isaiah King Raphael Leonard Yedidiah Louis Douglas McNeil III Elijah Rogers Christian Saulsberry Damon Sheehy-Guiseppi Jordus Smith KaVontae Turpin Travis Toivonen Tight ends . Christopher Bazile Elkanah Dillon Darren Dowdell Jeremias Houston Deylon Key David Meza	Offensive linemen Pat Allen Donald Boone Justin Brown Xavier Dampeer Jaylen Flye-Sadler D'Marcus Hayes Lawrence Keys Kamalie Matthews Jeremiah Poutasi Alan Randall Elijah Smith Saige Young Defensive linemen . James Bass Dakavion Champion Ja'Michael Edwards-Lott Jordan Harold Kyle Kitchens James Lee Jonathan McKinney Jr. Shawn Oakman Owen Obasuyi Donte Rumph Clavacia Smith Joe Tito Travonte Valentine Nicholas Williams	Linebackers Cecil Cherry Fred Conyers Jeremiah Dadeboe Max Davis Tigi Hill T.J. Holl Donte Lynch Defensive backs . Ikechukwu Adigwu Curtis Collins Karrheem Darrington Marloshawn Franklin Jr. James Gales Jr. Glenn Harris Benjamin Hunt IV Styvis Latham Darreon Jackson Marquill Osborne Joseph Putu Dominick Sanders Roman Tatum Dillon Winfrey Special teams . Vacant	Reserve lists Vacant Rights list . Vacant 22 Active, 0 Inactive

=== Franchise Players ===
Franchise Players are players that were voted to be "protected" from other teams in the draft.

==== Beasts ====
- Quinton Flowers (QB/RB)
- T.J. Edwards II (QB)
- Troy Evans Jr. (WR)
- Christian Saulsberry (WR)
- Marloshawn Franklin Jr. (CB)

==== Glacier Boyz ====
- David Pindell (QB)
- Calen Campbell (RB)
- Andrew Jamiel (WR)
- KaVontae Turpin (WR)
- Dominick Sanders (CB)

==== Wild Aces ====
- Jackson Erdmann (QB)
- LaDarius Galloway (RB)
- Raphael Leonard (WR)
- Richaud Floyd (WR)
- Joseph Putu (CB)

==== Zappers ====
- Johnny Manziel (QB)
- Logan Marchi (QB)
- Josh Gordon (WR)
- Travis Toivonen (WR)
- Marquill Osborne (CB)

=== Notable players ===
- Jackson Erdmann (QB)
- Quinton Flowers (QB/RB)
- Deondre Francois (QB)
- Josh Gordon (WR)
- Madre London (RB)
- Johnny Manziel (QB)
- Douglas McNeil III (WR)
- Shawn Oakman (DL)
- Quinn Porter (RB)
- Jeremiah Poutasi (OL)
- Damon Sheehy-Guiseppi (WR)
- Robert Turbin (RB)
- KaVontae Turpin (WR)

== Regular season standings ==
2021 Fan Controlled Football standings
Team	W	L	Pct.	PF	PA	PD	GB
**Beasts**	3	1	.750	132	126	6	—
Wild Aces	2	2	.500	144	138	6	1
Zappers	2	2	.500	138	134	4	1
Glacier Boyz	1	3	.250	126	142	-16	2

Bold indicates top seed

== Playoffs ==
Fans voted for which team would face the top-seeded Beasts in the semifinal.

Semifinals; March 13
1	Beasts	20
**4**	**Glacier Boyz**	**38**
**2**	**Wild Aces**	**32**
3	Zappers	6

People's Championship; March 20
4	Glacier Boyz	40
**2**	**Wild Aces**	**46**

== Statistical leaders ==
Records reflect statistics through six weeks of games.

Individual
Rushing yards	LaDarius Galloway	Wild Aces	313
Rushing touchdowns	Ladarius Galloway	Wild Aces	7
Passing yards	Logan Marchi	Zappers	421
Passing touchdowns	Logan Marchi	Zappers	9
Interceptions thrown	Logan Marchi	Zappers	2
Receptions	Andrew Jamiel	Glacier Boyz	23
Receiving yards	Andrew Jamiel	Glacier Boyz	308
Receiving touchdowns	Andrew Jamiel	Glacier Boyz	9
Combined tackles			
Interceptions	Joseph Putu	Wild Aces	2
Sacks			

== Awards ==
Award	Winner	Position	Final team
Gatorade Offensive Player of the Year	LaDarius Galloway	SB	Wild Aces
Progressive Defensive Player of the Year	Joseph Putu	CB	Wild Aces
Champion of the Fans	Jackson Erdmann	QB	Wild Aces
Gatorade Finals MVP	Ed Crouch	QB	Wild Aces
