= FCF Shoulda Been Stars =

Shoulda Been Stars
- Current season
Logo

General information
- Founded: November 25, 2020; 5 years ago
- Stadium: Infinite Energy Arena (2021); Pratt-Pullman Yards (2022)
- Headquartered: Pratt-Pullman Yards; Atlanta, Georgia
- Colors: Pink, Purple, Blue, White

Personnel
- Head coach: Carl Hargrave

Nicknames
- Aces (2021); Stars (2022–present)

Team history
- Wild Aces (2021); Shoulda Been Stars (2022–present)

League / conference affiliations
- OG Division (2022–present)

Championships
- People's Championship: 1 (2022)

Playoff appearances (2)
- FCF: 2021, 2022

Owners
- Austin Ekeler; Rachel Lindsay; Jack Settleman; Druski; Altered State Machine; Barbara Dunkelman

The FCF Shoulda Been Stars (SB Stars) are a professional indoor American football team of Fan Controlled Football (FCF). They are members of the OG Division and are owned by Druski and the Altered State Machine team, Austin Ekeler, and Rachel Lindsay.

On March 2, 2022, the FCF announced the team would be disbanded, as Greg Miller left the team due to the league's involvement in cryptocurrency and NFTs. They were originally known as the FCF Wild Aces and were rebranded to the FCF Shoulda Been Stars before the start of the 2022 season.

== Team history ==
=== Overview ===
On December 2, 2020, The Wild Aces team name and logo were announced, along with three other teams (Glacier Boyz, Beasts, and Zappers). On January 14, 2021, all four team uniforms were revealed. The Stars have one People's Championship titles when they were the Wild Aces. On March 2, 2022, Greg Miller left the ownership group and the team will undergo a rebrand. They would be known as the Shoulda Been Stars (SB Stars for short) at the start of the 2022 season. After the league decided to expand to 8 teams in 2022, the Stars were put in the OG Division with the Zappers, Beasts, and Glacier Boyz.

=== 2021 (v1.0) ===
The Wild Aces won their first franchise game 30–22 against the Glacier Boyz on February 13, 2021. The Aces finished the season 2–2 and earning 2nd-place in the league's regular season standings. Their week two franchise-tagged super back LaDarius Galloway was given the regular season Offensive MVP and Joseph Putu was given the Defensive MVP. The Beasts (3–1) finished 1st, the Zappers (2–2) finished 3rd, and the Glacier Boyz (1–3) finished 4th. They ultimately ended up winning against the #3 seed Zappers 32–6 in the semi-finals, advancing to the People's Championship.

Right before the game, it was revealed that former Baylor and XFL defensive end Shawn Oakman had signed with the Wild Aces. The Wild Aces won the People's Championship v1.0 game against the #4 seed Glacier Boyz 46–40, finishing the 2021 Fan Controlled Football season 4–2 and earning their 1st championship in franchise history. Dual-threat quarterback Ed Crouch was named People's Championship Gatorade MVP. Crouch went 4 for 9 with 72 yards and 1 passing touchdown. He also rushed 6 times for 53 yards and added a rushing touchdown. His rushing touchdown came on the last play of the game where he faked a run to Galloway and outran a defender to touch the pilon with no time left on the clock.

=== 2022 (v2.0) ===
After becoming the first team to rebrand in FCF history, the SB Stars looked to continue their winning standards after becoming the 2021 People's Champions.

The Stars finished 4–3, which was good enough to finish in 3rd place behind the FCF Bored Ape Football Club (5–2) and the FCF Knights of Degen (4–3). The SB Stars would go on to lose to the FCF Zappers 50–24 in the first round, marking their first-ever playoff loss.

==== Final roster ====
Shoulda Been Stars roster
Quarterbacks: 5 DVonn Gibbons; 15 Slade Jarman; Super backs: 25 Harrison Dreher; Wide receivers: 0 Tyis Boykin; 3 Travalle Calvin; 16 Ismail Brooks; 82 Antonio Turner; Tight ends: 80 Chris Robb; 87 Levi Shetler	Offensive linemen: 66 Abram Holland; 72 Zion Byrd; 72 Jon Capron; 73 Erlington Jones; 76 Jonathon Irizarry; Defense: 20 Isaiah Edwards DB; 21 Roman Tatum DB; 22 Marquis Cain DB; 23 Marquill Osborne DB; 36 Ronald Malbrough DB; 46 Austin Jones DL; 52 Henry Kellogg DL; 54 Jim Jones LB; 55 Fred Conyers LB; 91 Dakavian Champion DL; 99 Travonte Valentine DL	Franchise player(s): 7 LaDarius Galloway; Keepers: 3 Travalle Calvin WR; 15 Slade Jarman QB; Rookies in italics updated September 10, 2022 25 active, 0 inactive, 0 practice squad, 0 unsigned → Fan Controlled Football

== Statistics and players ==
=== Season-by-season results ===
List of Shoulda Been Stars seasons

People's champions (2021–present)	Division champions	Playoff berth

As of September 13, 2022

Season	League	Division	Regular season					Postseason results	Awards
Season	League	Division	Finish	W	L	T	Pct.	Postseason results	Awards
Wild Aces
2021	FCFL	—	2nd	2	2	0	.500	Won Semifinals (Zappers) 32–6; Won People's Championship (Glacier Boyz) 46–40	LaDarius Galloway (O-MVP)
Shoulda Been Stars
2022	FCFL	OG	1st	4	3	0	.571	Lost Semifinals (Zappers) 24–50	Dak Champion (LOTY)
2023	FCFL	??	—	0	0	0	—		
Totals				W	L	T	Pct.		
Totals				2	2	0	.500	Wild Aces regular season record (2021)	
Totals				4	3	0	.571	Shoulda Been Stars regular season record (2022–present)	
Totals				6	5	0	.545	All-time regular season record (2021–present)	
Totals				2	1	—	.667	All-time postseason record (2021–present)	
Totals				8	6	0	.571	All-time regular season and postseason record (2021–present)	
Totals				1 People's Championships, 1 Divisional Championships					

=== Records ===
Seasonal Stars leaders
Leader	Player	Record	Year
Passing	Slade Jarman	603 passing yards	2022
Passing	Slade Jarman	9 passing touchdowns	2022
Rushing	LaDarius Galloway	186 rushing yards	2021
Rushing	LaDarius Galloway	6 rushing touchdowns	2022
Receiving	Travelle Calvin	249 receiving yards	2022
Receiving	Chris Robb	3 receiving touchdowns	2022
