= Barbara Dunkelman =

Canadian actress

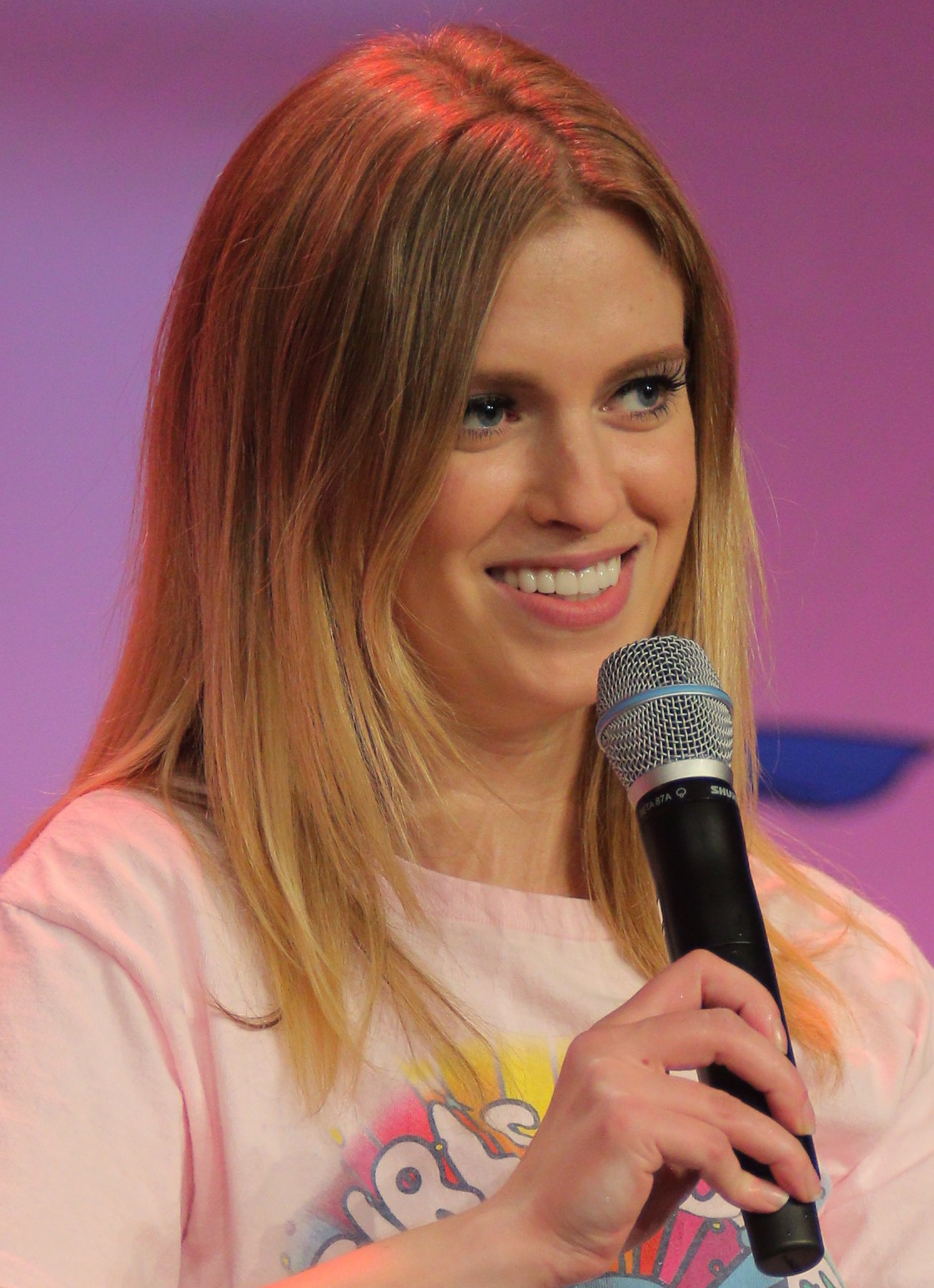
- Dunkelman at the 2018 Florida Supercon
- Born: Barbara Julie Dunkelman; July 2, 1989 (age 37); Montreal, Quebec, Canada
- Occupation: Actress
- Years active: 2004–present
- Spouse: Trevor Collins (m. 2025)

Barbara Julie Dunkelman (born July 2, 1989) is a Canadian actress and internet personality. She is known for her work with the former production company Rooster Teeth, where she served as a Creative Director and was formerly the Director of Social and Community Marketing and a Program Director for RTX. She also provides the voice of Yang Xiao Long in the web series RWBY and Nerris in Camp Camp, and was a partial owner of the FCF Wild Aces Indoor Football Team.

== Early life ==
Dunkelman was born on July 2, 1989, in Montreal, Quebec, to a Jewish family, and was raised alongside two brothers. She and her family moved to Ottawa, Ontario, when she was 8 years old. She graduated from Concordia University with a degree in Marketing in June 2011. Dunkelman is a permanent resident of the United States, residing in Austin, Texas.

== Career ==
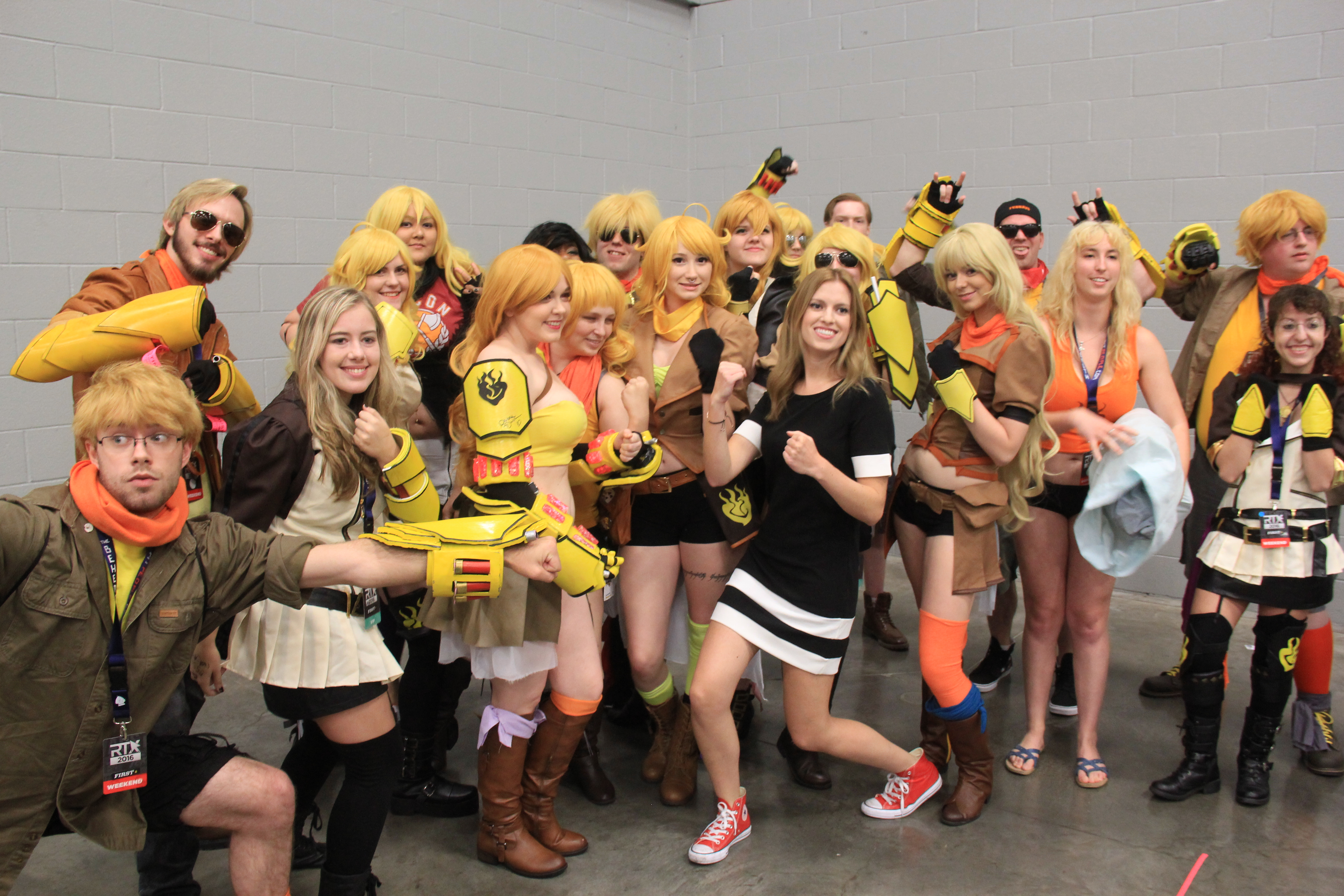
Dunkelman in 2016 with a group of cosplayers dressed as Yang Xiao Long, her character in RWBY

Dunkelman signed up on the Rooster Teeth website in October 2004. In 2005 she attended and assisted at the premiere Toronto Red vs. Blue fan event, RvBTO. Starting in 2008, she helped organize it as co-host and Rooster Teeth liaison. She was a hostess for WatchMojo.com for several months in 2010.

In September 2011, she co-founded the triple award-winning Internet Box podcast hosted by herself, Michael Jones, Ray Narvaez, Jr., Andrew Blanchard, Mike Kroon, and Dylan "Dylon" Saramago, with Lindsay Jones and Kerry Shawcross being added to the cast later on. In December 2011, she was hired by Rooster Teeth as their first Community Manager, in charge of developing community features and the company's social media. At the time of her hiring she was the most-followed member on the Rooster Teeth community site. Since February 2012, she appears regularly on the award-winning Rooster Teeth Podcast.

In May 2013, alongside fellow employee Jack Pattillo, she was interviewed as part of Microsoft's 2013 E3 Xbox One reveal. Despite her numerous appearances on the podcast and at events, she estimates that "only 25 percent" of her job, which entails marketing and management functions within the company, takes place in the public eye. Also in 2013, she began voicing the character of Yang Xiao Long in the Streamy Award-winning series RWBY, which is her most recognizable acting role. She has also lent her voice to Cosmos in Fairy Tail and ORF in X-Ray and Vav.

In the 2019 companion book to the series, Dunkelman said that at the time she was working as the community manager at Rooster Teeth and Monty Oum introduced her to Yang Xiao Long's character, remarking "I'm working on this show and there's this badass Goldilocks character. Do you want to play her?," with Dunkleman saying yes, even though she had never done any voice acting yet, and was listed at the end of the 'Red' trailer for the character Ruby Rose, even though she hadn't even auditioned for the role at the time. Dunkleman also said that Yang is "fun to play" as she is even-keeled in real-life while Yang can become very hot-headed, called it an honor to play "a character who's such a badass" and said it was nice to live vicariously through Yang, who loves motorcycle-riding.

Beginning in September 2016, Dunkelman began hosting Always Open, a lifestyle and sexual health podcast within Rooster Teeth. The podcast went on an "indefinite hiatus" in June 2020, but returned in March 2023, along with a new YouTube channel entitled "All Good No Worries". Also in September 2016, Dunkelman launched an eponymous clothing line at Rooster Teeth. In September 2019, Dunkelman became a Creative Director at Rooster Teeth.

Dunkelman has amassed a number of live-action acting credits, which include roles in Rooster Teeth Shorts, Immersion, Day 5, and Ten Little Roosters, as well as the horror comedy Blood Fest. She is also one of five partial owners of the FCF Wild Aces Indoor Football Team.

== Personal life ==
Dunkelman has been in a relationship with producer Trevor Collins since 2018. On November 23, 2023, the couple announced their engagement on Instagram. They were married on April 26, 2025.

In 2021, she revealed in a video on her YouTube channel that she has a severe case of hyperhidrosis, and that she would be seeking surgery to curtail the effects of her condition.

In a March 2023 interview with her friend Arryn Zech, a fellow voice actor on RWBY, Dunkelman said she is "not fully straight", but is "for the most part...fairly straight".

== Filmography ==
=== Films ===
Year	Title	Role	Notes
2015	Lazer Team	Cheerleader	Cameo
2017	Lazer Team 2	Reporter #2	
2018	Blood Fest	Ashley	
2023	Justice League x RWBY: Super Heroes & Huntsmen	Yang Xiao Long	Voice only; Direct-to-Video
2024	Red vs. Blue: Restoration	Security Team #2	Voice only; Direct-to-video

=== Web Series ===
Year	Title	Role	Notes
2011–2014, 2016	Internet Box	Herself	Podcast
2012–2024	Rooster Teeth Podcast	Herself	Podcast
2013–present	RWBY	Yang Xiao Long	Voice, motion capture
2014	Fairy Tail	Cosmos	Voice only
2014	iBlade	Worker of Secrets / Sharon	
2014	Ten Little Roosters	Barbara	
2014–2015	X-Ray and Vav	ORF	Voice only
2014–present	Immersion	Barbara / Soldier (Blue Moose)	
2014–2020	Red vs. Blue	Jensen	Voice only; Writer of episode "Head Canon"
2015–2021	Death Battle	Yang Xiao Long, Mama Boomstick	Voice, episode: "Yang VS Tifa", "Macho Man VS Kool-Aid Man"
2015–2021	Fanarchy	Herself	Documentary
2015–2021	The Strangerhood	Planner	Voice
2015–2021	Tom & Bill	Additional Voices	Voice; one episode, uncredited
2016	Crunch Time	Beatrice	
2016	Day 5	Flip	
2016–2019	Camp Camp	Nerris	Voice only; Season 1-4
2016–2020	Always Open	Herself	Podcast host
2016-2018; 2021	RWBY Chibi	Yang Xiao Long / Herself	
2017	The Eleven Little Roosters	Agent Moose	
2018	Nomad of Nowhere	Dolores	Voice only
2020–present	Zelda Hero High	Zee	
2021–present	Tales from the Stinky Dragon	Bartholomew 'Bart' Finn (Campaign One), Adelyn Bovant (The Chosen ones), Ellga Von Brath (Campaign Two), Muffin (Maze Rat Pack), Dug Boone (Campaign Three)	Podcast
2021	RWBY: Fairy Tales	Yang Xiao Long	Voice only; one episode
2022	RWBY: Ice Queendom	Yang Xiao Long	Voice only; English dub
2023	Stinky Dragon Adventures	Bartholomew 'Bart' Finn, Old Hag, Dragon, Various voices	Voice; lead puppeteer
2024	RWBY VTubing	Yang Xiao Long	Voice only; guest
2024	RWBY Beyond	Yang Xiao Long	Voice only; one Episode

=== Video games ===
Year	Title	Role	Notes
2014	Smite	Yang Xiao Long	Voice only
2016	RWBY: Grimm Eclipse	Yang Xiao Long	Voice only
2018	BlazBlue: Cross Tag Battle	Yang Xiao Long	Voice only
2018	Paladins: Champions of the Realm	Yang Xiao Long	Voice only
2022	RWBY: Arrowfell	Yang Xiao Long	Voice only
