= Shawn Oakman =

American gridiron football player (born 1992)

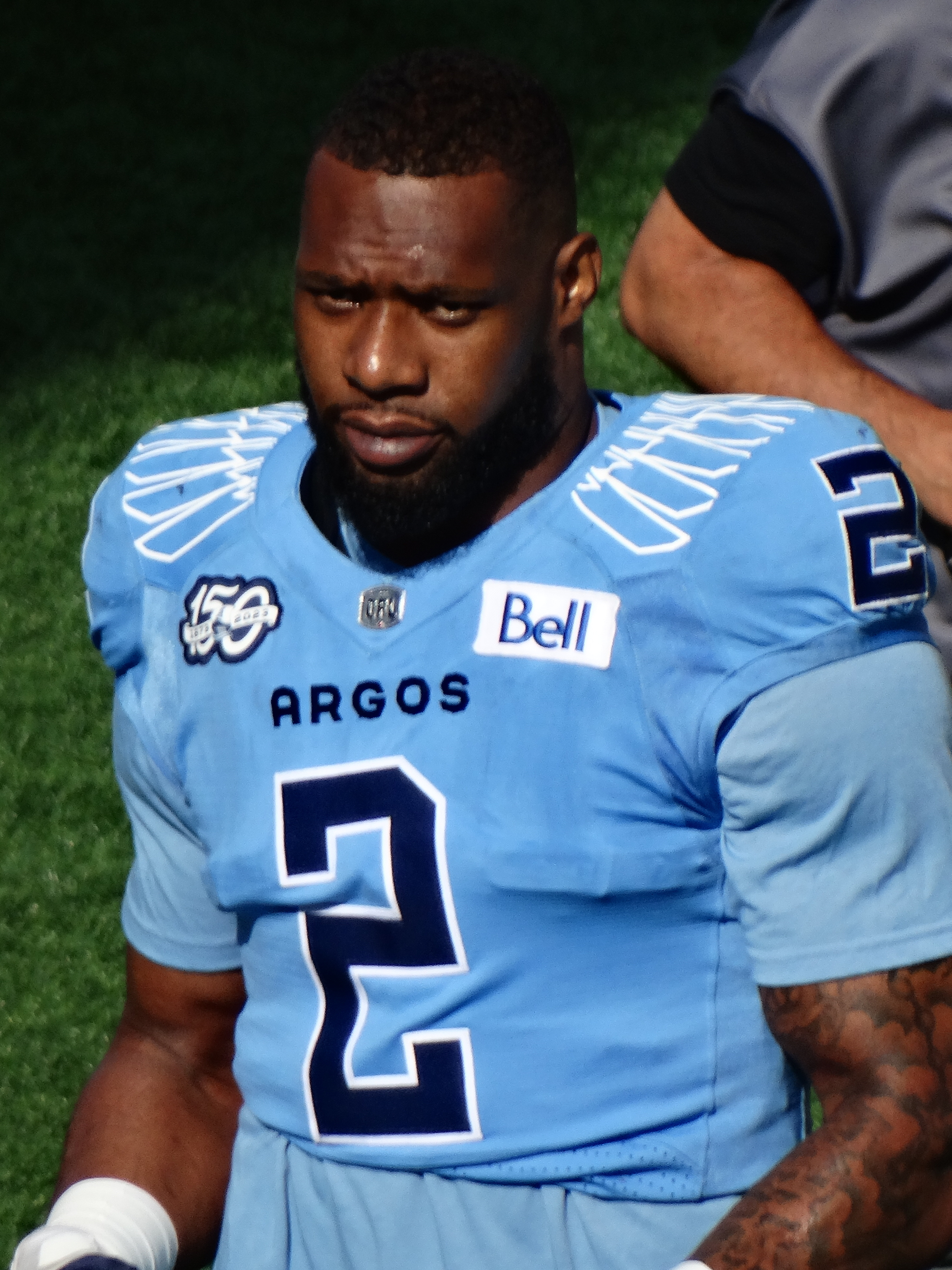
- Oakman with the Toronto Argonauts in 2023

No. 2 – Pennsylvania Benjamins
- Position: Defensive lineman
- CFL status: American

Personal information
- Born: April 7, 1992 (age 34); Philadelphia, Pennsylvania, U.S.
- Listed height: 6 ft 8 in (2.03 m)
- Listed weight: 280 lb (127 kg)

Career information
- High school: Penn Wood (Lansdowne, Pennsylvania)
- College: Penn State (2011); Baylor (2013–2015)
- NFL draft: 2016: undrafted

Career history
- Triangle Torch (2018)*; Bismarck Bucks (2018); West Virginia Roughriders (2019); Los Angeles Wildcats (2020); FCF Wild Aces (2021); Toronto Argonauts (2021–2024); Edmonton Elks (2024); Montreal Alouettes (2025); Pennsylvania Benjamins (2026–present)
- * Offseason or practice squad member only

Awards and highlights
- Grey Cup champion (2022); CFL All-Star (2021); 3× CFL East All-Star (2021, 2022, 2025); First-team All-Big 12 (2014); Second-team All-Big 12 (2015)

Career CFL statistics
- Games played: 53
- Total tackles: 122
- Sacks: 21
- Forced fumbles: 3
- Interceptions: 1
- Stats at CFL.ca
- Stats at Pro Football Reference

Shawn Michael Oakman (born April 7, 1992) is an American professional football defensive lineman for the Pennsylvania Benjamins of the International Arena League (IAL). He played college football for the Baylor Bears. Oakman has also been a member of the Triangle Torch and the West Virginia Roughriders of the American Arena League (AAL), the Bismarck Bucks of Champions Indoor Football (CIF), the Los Angeles Wildcats of the XFL, the Wild Aces of Fan Controlled Football, and the Toronto Argonauts, Edmonton Elks, and Montreal Alouettes of the Canadian Football League (CFL).

== Early life ==
Oakman attended Penn Wood High School in Lansdowne, Pennsylvania. He played both football and basketball. He committed to play college football at Penn State University in July 2010.

== College career ==
=== Penn State University ===
Oakman was redshirted as a true freshman at PSU in 2011.

On February 27, 2012, Penn State announced that Oakman had been dismissed from the Nittany Lions football team for an unspecified violation of team rules. (See Personal life.)

Oakman transferred to Baylor University in July 2012.

=== Baylor University ===
As per NCAA transfer rules, Oakman took the entire 2012 season off. Oakman played in 13 games as a backup defensive end in 2013. He recorded 33 tackles and two sacks. In his first year as a starter, Oakman had a breakout season in 2014. He finished the season with 25.5 tackles for loss and 11.0 sacks. He earned third-team All-America honors from the Associated Press and was a consensus All-Big 12 selection. Oakman was projected by some analysts and scouts to be a first round pick in the 2015 NFL draft. Instead of declaring for the draft, he decided to return to Baylor for his senior season. In 2015, Oakman was not able to match his successful 2014 season. He recorded only 4.5 sacks in 2015.

== Professional career ==
=== Pre-draft ===
Several early mock drafts projected Oakman to be a first round pick in the 2016 NFL draft. Chris Burke of Sports Illustrated penciled in Oakman as the first overall pick in his "2016 NFL Mock Draft 1.0," which was published a few days after the conclusion of the 2015 NFL Draft. Oakman's production dropped in 2015 and his draft stock fell throughout the season. One AFC area scout commented that he would not select Oakman in the first three rounds of the draft. Some of the concerns about Oakman were his skinny lower body, lack of pass-rush technique, and "inconsistent motor chasing plays and inability to make plays against better competition".

==== Sexual assault case ====
After Oakman's arrest on a sexual assault charge, which occurred only two weeks before the 2016 NFL draft, an NFC executive told Lance Zierlein of NFL.com that Oakman was "undraftable now" because the case is unlikely to be resolved before the start of the draft. Zierlein believed the arrest would likely result in Oakman being removed from all NFL team boards. Oakman went undrafted in the 2016 NFL draft. After the draft, he wasn't expected to get signed as an undrafted free agent due to the legal issues he was facing at the time. He was subsequently found not guilty of the alleged sexual assault.

Pre-draft measurables
Height	Weight	Arm length	Hand span	40-yard dash	10-yard split	20-yard split	20-yard shuttle	Three-cone drill	Vertical jump	Broad jump	Bench press
6 ft 7 5/8 in (2.02 m)	287 lb (130 kg)	35 3/4 in (0.91 m)	10 5/8 in (0.27 m)	4.84 s	1.66 s	2.67 s	4.56 s	7.53 s	32 in (0.81 m)	10 ft 3 in (3.12 m)	23 reps
All values from NFL Combine/Pro Day

=== Triangle Torch ===
In November 2017, Oakman signed with the Triangle Torch of the American Arena League. He helped lead the Triangle Torch to the AIF Championship but lost a close game to Cape Fear Heroes.

=== Bismarck Bucks ===
On March 8, 2018 Oakman signed with the Bismarck Bucks of Champions Indoor Football.

=== The Spring League ===
On April 6, 2019, Oakman signed with The Spring League and was assigned to the Austin Generals. He helped lead the Austin Generals to win the 2019 TSL regular season title.

=== West Virginia Roughriders ===
In June 2019, Shawn Oakman signed with the West Virginia Roughriders of the American Arena League.

=== Los Angeles Wildcats ===
On October 16, 2019, Oakman was drafted to the Los Angeles Wildcats of the XFL. He was waived on December 17. The Wildcats re-signed Oakman on January 24, 2020. In his debut game, Oakman had a sack and a pass deflected. He had his contract terminated when the league suspended operations on April 10.

=== Fan Controlled Football ===
Oakman also played in Fan Controlled Football as a late addition to the roster in March 2021, appearing in the People's Championship with Wild Aces and won the championship.

=== Toronto Argonauts ===
On February 15, 2021, Oakman signed with the Toronto Argonauts of the Canadian Football League (CFL). In a shortened 2021 season, he played in 13 of 14 regular season games where he had 35 defensive tackles and six sacks. At season's end, he was named a CFL All-Star at the defensive tackle position. In 2022, he played and started in 17 regular season games and recorded 28 defensive tackles, six sacks, and one forced fumble, en route to a second CFL East All-Star award. He also played and started in the 109th Grey Cup where he had two defensive tackles and one sack as the Argonauts defeated the Winnipeg Blue Bombers and Oakman won his first championship.

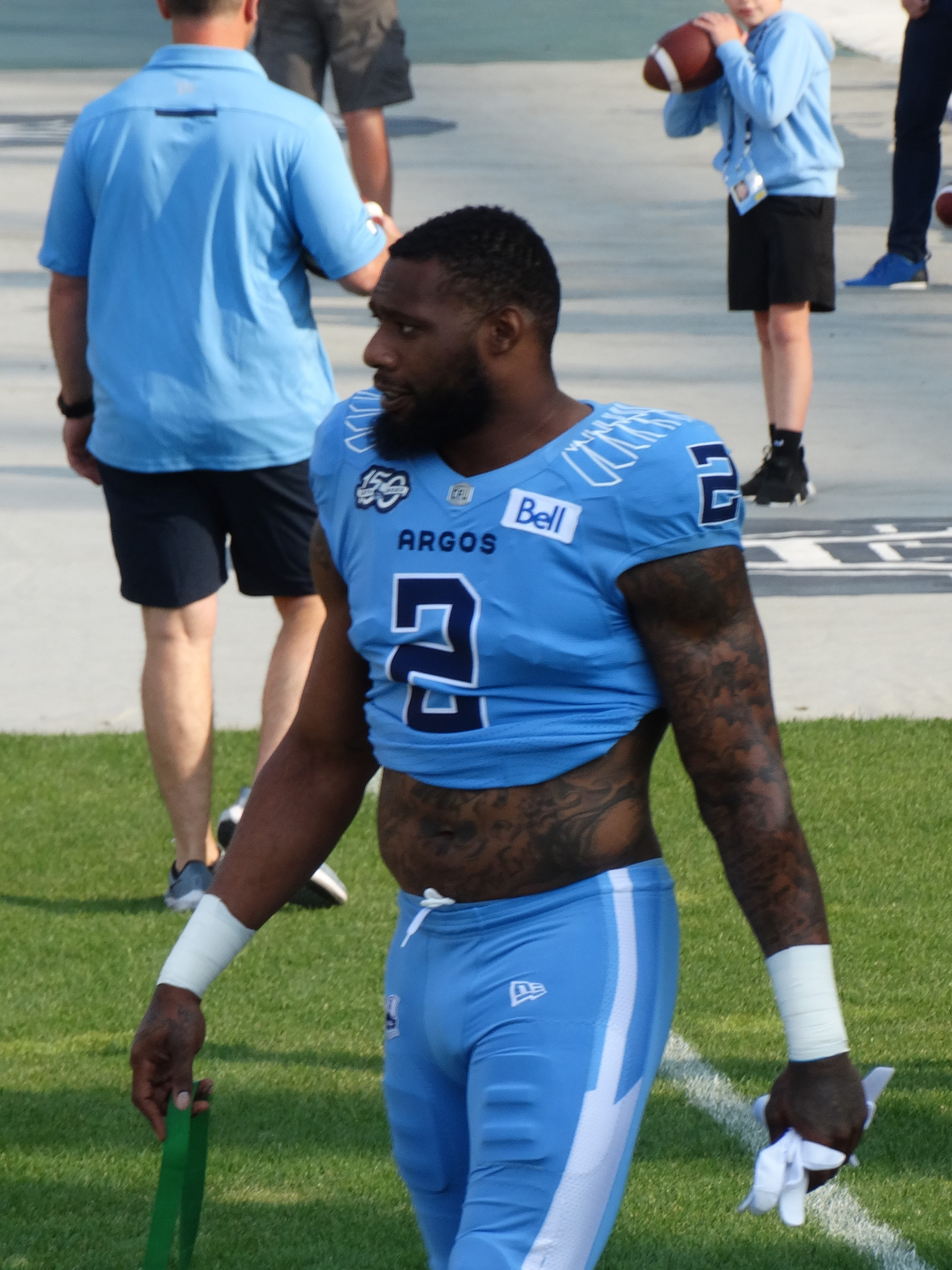
Oakman with the Argonauts in 2023

In the 2023 season, Oakman played in 15 regular season games, starting in 13, while serving as a healthy scratch for the other games. He recorded 27 defensive tackles, six sacks, and one forced fumble that year. To start the 2024 season, Oakman was again a healthy scratch for the team's first game. Soon after, on June 11, 2024, it was announced that he had been released by the Argonauts.

=== Edmonton Elks ===
On July 7, 2024, it was announced that Oakman had signed with the Edmonton Elks. He played in 14 regular season games where he had 32 defensive tackles, three sacks, one interception, and one forced fumble. He became a free agent upon the expiry of his contract on February 11, 2025.

=== Montreal Alouettes ===
On February 11, 2025, it was announced that Oakman had signed with the Montreal Alouettes. He played in 17 regular season games where he had 35 defensive tackles and six sacks. On October 31, he was released after being suspended by the CFL for violating the league's Gender-Based Violence and Harassment Policy.

=== Pennsylvania Benjamins ===
On April 14, 2026, Oakman signed with the Pennsylvania Benjamins of the International Arena League.

== Personal life ==
On February 25, 2012, Oakman was involved in an incident at a Penn State dining hall, and was eventually charged by PSU police with disorderly conduct, harassment, and retail theft. According to police, Oakman fled the scene after shoving a cashier who refused to return his student ID over unpaid items. In a later interview, Oakman stated that the cashier withheld his ID after she found that there were no points on his meal card and that he had only grabbed her wrist to retrieve it and return to his dorm room. According to Oakman, this incident led to his dismissal from the Penn State football team by then head coach Bill O'Brien.

Oakman was named in a January 2013 Waco police incident report alleging he physically assaulted a woman. According to the report, Oakman grabbed the alleged victim under her armpits and shoved her into brick walls and cabinets at her South Waco apartment. The alleged incident was about six months after Oakman enrolled at Baylor after being kicked off the football team at Penn State University for physically assaulting a female cashier who reportedly tried to stop him from stealing food from a campus store.

On April 13, 2016, Oakman was arrested in Waco and charged after a woman accused him of sexual assault. According to a police affidavit, Oakman met the accuser at a bar and asked if she wanted to go to his off-campus residence. They walked to Oakman's duplex where, according to the woman, he forced her into a bedroom, forcibly removed her clothes, forced her onto the bed, and sexually assaulted her. On July 20, 2016, a grand jury in McLennan County indicted Oakman on charges of second-degree felony sexual assault. The trial of the case began February 26, 2019. On February 28, 2019, after the jury deliberated for 45 minutes, Oakman was found not guilty of sexual assault.

=== In popular culture ===
At the Cotton Bowl Classic on January 1, 2015, a picture of Oakman on the jumbotron at AT&T Stadium went viral across social media, including social media site Twitter. The image became "an internet sensation" overnight because of his intimidating build, with Oakman standing at 6 ft 9 in (2.06 m).
