= Andrew Jamiel =

American football player

No. 18
- Position: Wide receiver

Personal information
- Born: May 1, 1997 (age 29); Cape Cod, Massachusetts, U.S.
- Listed height: 5 ft 10 in (1.78 m)
- Listed weight: 185 lb (84 kg)

Career information
- High school: Dennis-Yarmouth Regional (South Yarmouth, Massachusetts)
- College: Stonehill
- NFL draft: 2020: undrafted

Career history
- FCF Glacier Boyz (2021); TSL Sea Lions (2021); FCF Glacier Boyz (2022); Orlando Guardians (2023)

Awards and highlights
- First-team All-NE10 (2017); 2× Second-team All-NE10 (2016, 2018); NE10 Rookie of the Year (2016); NE10 All-Rookie Team (2016)

Andrew Joseph Jamiel (born May 1, 1997) is an American former professional football wide receiver. Jamiel played college football for the Stonehill Skyhawks in Easton, Massachusetts, and high school football for Dennis-Yarmouth Regional High School in South Yarmouth, Massachusetts.

== Early life ==
Andrew Jamiel attended Dennis-Yarmouth Regional High School in South Yarmouth, Massachusetts. He was a graduate of the Class of 2015. In his senior season, Jamiel was named MA Division 4 Player of the Year, Boston Globe All Scholastic, and Boston Herald All Scholastic. In the 2015 season, Jamiel accounted for 2,705 yards (1,583 rushing, 612 receiving, and 510 return). He set the school record for most touchdowns in a single season with 26 and most touchdowns in a career with 47.

== College career ==
Jamiel played college football for the Stonehill Skyhawks in Easton, Massachusetts. As a freshman, he played in ten games and recorded 91 receptions for 843 yards and seven touchdowns, earning Northeast-10 Conference Rookie of the Year as well as second-team all-conference honors. He was named conference rookie of the week four times: on September 12, September 26, October 17, and on November 7. Jamiel was given the game ball as Offensive Player of the Week after Stonehill's game against New Haven.

As a sophomore, Jamiel played in nine games and made 81 catches for 1,035 yards and 13 touchdowns. He was named first-team all-conference and was named New England Football Writers New England Division II/III All-Star.

In his junior year, Jamiel played in ten games and made 60 receptions for 698 yards and scored three touchdowns, earning second-team All-Northeast-10 Conference honors.

As a senior, Jamiel played in ten games, amassing 76 receptions for 1,063 yards and seven touchdowns. He was given the Fr. William Gartland C.S.C. Award and was named conference player of the week once (September 9).

Jamiel graduated as a member of the class of 2020 and holds multiple Stonehill records, including: single game receptions (18), single game receiving yards (294), single game touchdowns (5), and single game all-purpose yards (294).

== Professional career ==
=== Glacier Boyz ===
Jamiel has played in Fan Controlled Football (FCF) for the Glacier Boyz and in The Spring League (TSL) for the Sea Lions.

In the 2022 season with the Glacier Boyz, Jamiel had 21 receptions, 323 yards, 8 TD's, and 4 XPs.

On July 25, 2022, Jamiel had a workout with his hometown team, the New England Patriots.

=== Orlando Guardians ===
On November 16, 2022, Jamiel was drafted by the Orlando Guardians with the 13th overall pick in the 2nd round of the Phase 1: Skill Players portion of the 2023 XFL draft. The Guardians folded when the XFL and USFL merged to create the United Football League (UFL).
