= 2022 Fan Controlled Football season =

- League: Fan Controlled Football
- Sport: Indoor American football
- Hosts: Pullman Yards
- Duration: April 16 – June 11, 2022
- Games: 31
- Teams: 8
- TV partner(s): Twitch, VENN, DAZN LX, and Peacock

Regular season
- Season champions: Bored Ape FC

The People's Championship v2.0
- Champions: Zappers
- Runners-up: Bored Ape FC
- Finals MVP: Kelly Bryant

FCF seasons
- 2021

The 2022 Fan Controlled Football season is the second season of the Fan Controlled Football (FCF), a professional indoor football league. In the 2022 championship game, the Zappers beat the Bored Ape FC to win The People's Championship v2.0.

== Background ==
The FCF's second season, nicknamed "Season v.2.0" by the league, was scheduled to begin in fall 2021 but was postponed to spring 2022 to follow after the NFL's Super Bowl. The season began on April 16, thus putting FCF in direct competition with the 2022 USFL season that launched on the same night.

The league announced they were expanding to eight teams for the 2022 season and announced a new broadcast deal with NBCUniversal subsidiary NBCLX and Peacock to broadcast every game of the 2022 season. In October 2021, the FCF announced the Ballerz Collective and two of the four expansion teams, Team KoD and Team 8oki, later to be given names by the fans. The final two expansion teams were announced on 12 January 2022, Team Gutter Cats, and Team Bored Apes, also later to be given names by the fans. The defending champion Wild Aces reorganized and rebranded as the Shoulda Been Stars following the departure of one of its co-owners.

On 12 January 2022, the FCF announced a $40 million investment—led by Animoca Brands and Delphi Digital—for spectator-controlled football games. Ahead of the 2022 season, the league began construction on a 1,500-seat arena at Pullman Yard in Atlanta, Georgia.

== Teams ==
Team	Colors	Joined	Owners
Beasts		2021	Marshawn Lynch, Todd Gurley, Miro, Marcus Peters, and Renee Montgomery
Glacier Boyz		2021	Richard Sherman, Quavo, Deestroying, and Adin Ross
Zappers		2021	Trevor May, Dalvin Cook, Bob Menery, and Ronnie 2k
8oki		2022	Steve Aoki and 888 Crypto.
Knights of Degen		2022	Drew Austin, Jack Settleman, Tiki Barber, Ronde Barber, Cynthia Frelund, Blake Jamieson, Shara Senderoff, Mike O'Day, Jared Augustine, and Jasmine Maetta
Bored Ape Football Club		2022	Lyndsey Byrnes, beijingdou (Josh Ong), JerseyBorn (Sean Semola), tropoFarmer, ElectionDayMad1 and KingKhah (AJ Khah)
Kingpins		2022	Jamal Anderson, SPOTTIE WIFI, Dr. Leo DiCatrio (Cory Teer), and ABigThingBadly
Shoulda Been Stars (originally the Wild Aces)		2021	Austin Ekeler, Rachel Lindsay, Druski, and Altered State Machines.

== Players ==
Before the start of the season, it was announced that Pro Football Hall of Famer Terrell Owens, age 48, would come out of retirement to play for the Zappers. He would later be traded to the Knights of Degen. On May 20, it was reported that Michael Vick would join him in the league, but he later denied the rumors.

== Regular season standings ==
2022 Fan Controlled Football standings
Team	W	L	Pct.	PF	PA	PD
**x** – **Bored Ape FC**	5	2	.714	190	166	24
Knights of Degen	4	3	.571	256	198	58
**x** – **Shoulda Been Stars**	4	3	.571	168	144	24
**x** – **8oki**	4	3	.571	202	224	-22
Glacier Boyz	3	4	.429	186	180	6
Kingpins	3	4	.429	182	216	-34
**x** – **Zappers**	3	4	.429	166	204	-38
Beasts	2	5	.286	180	198	-18

x – Bold indicates playoff participant

== Division standings ==
OG Division standings
Team	W	L	Pct.	PF	PA	PD
**x** – **Shoulda Been Stars**	4	3	.571	168	144	24
**x** – **Zappers**	3	4	.429	166	204	-38
Glacier Boyz	3	4	.429	186	180	6
Beasts	2	5	.286	180	198	-18

Ballerz Division standings
Team	W	L	Pct.	PF	PA	PD
**x** – **Bored Ape FC**	5	2	.714	190	166	24
**x** – **8oki**	4	3	.571	202	224	-22
Knights of Degen	4	3	.571	256	198	58
Kingpins	3	4	.429	182	216	-34

== Playoffs ==
Semifinals; June 4
**Bored Ape FC**	**38**
8oki	32
Shoulda Been Stars	24
**Zappers**	**50**

People's Championship; June 11
Bored Ape FC	24
**Zappers**	**42**
