= FCF Beasts =

American professional indoor football team

- Current season

General information
- Founded: 2020; 6 years ago
- Stadium: Pullman Yard, Atlanta
- Colors
- Website: www.fcf.io/teams/beasts

Personnel
- Owners: Marshawn Lynch, Miroslav Barnyashev, Renee Montgomery, Todd Gurley, Marcus Peters

League / conference affiliations
- FCFL

Championships
- League championships: 0; 0

The FCF Beasts are a professional indoor football team based in Atlanta, founded in 2020. They are a member of the Fan Controlled Football League and are currently owned by Marshawn Lynch, Miroslav Barnyashev, Todd Gurley, and Renee Montgomery.

== History ==
On December 2, 2020, The Beasts team name and logo were announced, along with three other teams (Glacier Boyz, Zappers, and Wild Aces). On January 14, 2021, all four team uniforms were revealed.

== 2021 season V1.0 ==
The Beasts won their first franchise game 48–44 against the Zappers and former Heisman Winner Johnny Manziel on February 13, 2021.

On March 5, 2021, to load up for the Playoffs, The Beasts signed Robert Turbin, a former teammate of team owner Marshawn Lynch.

The Beasts finished the regular season 3–1, securing the #1 seed in the playoffs, but ultimately ended up losing to the #4 seed Glacier Boyz 38–20 in the semi-finals, finishing the 2021 Fan Controlled Football season 3–2.

== 2022 season V2.0 ==
For the new season, The Beasts would franchise-tag Quinn Porter and draft Jordus Smith with the first round pick in the FCF draft. First game in the season would be against the Glacier Boyz, where they beat them 36 to 20. In Week 2, The Beasts would franchise-tag Jordus Smith and draft the Heavy Hitters defensive unit in the first round pick in the FCF draft. The Beasts would go against Shoulda Been Stars and lose 24 to 6. In Week 3, The Beasts would franchise-tag LaMarcus Caradine and draft Jacoby Herring in the first round pick in the FCF draft.

The Beasts made a controversial decision in Week 3 when they drafted Alphonso Howard, who's been the Beasts backup quarterback for the first 3 games, for the starting quarterback position instead of Jason Stewart, who would be drafted by the Kingpins. The Beasts would go against the 8oki Football Club and lose 44 to 38. On April 29, The Beasts recruited Martavis Bryant to the team. In Week 4, the FCF League would move the Beasts back-up quarterback, Dentarrius Yon to the Knights of Degen after the departure of Danny Southwick, and moved Jason Stewart back to the Beasts as Yon's position. The Beasts went against the Zappers and beat them 28 to 0, being the first team in FCF history to shutout a game.

The Beasts would be a part of the first trade in FCF trade history, trading Jacoby Herring to the Knights of Degen in exchange for Dentarrius Yon, and trading Jason Stewart and the Beasts' draft picks to the Zappers for their draft picks. The Beasts would have a rematch against the Glacier Boyz in week 5, losing by 34 to 18. In week 6, the Beasts would lose 34 to 16 to the Should Been Stars, sealing the Stars to the playoffs.

The Beasts are 2–4 in the regular season, being #3 of the OG Teams.

== Final roster of V1.0 ==
2021 FCF Beasts final roster
Quarterbacks 9 Quinton Flowers 12 T.J. Edwards II Running backs . 33 Quinn Porter 30 Robert Turbin Wide receivers . 22 Christian Saulsberry 80 Yedidiah Louis 7 Troy Evans Jr. 81 Jordus Smith 88 Joshua Johnson Tight ends . DAM Nation	Offensive linemen DAM Nation Defensive linemen . Heavy Hitters	Linebackers Heavy Hitters Defensive backs . Heavy Hitters Special teams . Vacant	Reserve lists Vacant Rights list . Vacant 22 Active, 0 Inactive

== Final roster of V2.0 ==
2022 FCF Beasts final roster
Quarterbacks 2 Alphonso Howard 15 Dentarrius Yon Running backs . 33 Quinn Porter Wide receivers . 11 Jordus Smith 13 LaMarcus Caradine 14 Tra Chandler 10 Martavis Bryant Tight ends . The Trenchmen	Offensive linemen The Trenchmen Defensive linemen . The Hitmen	Linebackers The Hitmen Defensive backs . The Hitmen Special teams . Vacant	Reserve lists Vacant Rights list . Vacant 24 Active, 0 Inactive
