= FCF Zappers =

Professional indoor football in Fan Controlled Football League

Zappers
- Current season

General information
- Founded: December 2, 2020; 5 years ago
- Headquartered: Pratt-Pullman Yards; Atlanta, Georgia
- Colors

Team history
- Zappers (2021–present)

League / conference affiliations
- Old Division (2022); ?? Division (2023–present)

Championships
- Division championships: 0: OG Division: None

Playoff appearances (2)
- FCF: 2021, 2022

Owners
- Trevor May; Dalvin Cook; Bob Menery; Alex Campbell; Ronnie Singh; Stephen Deleonardis

The FCF Zappers are a professional indoor football team founded on December 2, 2020. They are a member of the Fan Controlled Football League and are currently owned by Trevor May, Dalvin Cook, Bob Menery, Alex Campbell, Ronnie Singh, and Stephen Deleonardis.

== History ==
On December 2, 2020, the Zappers' team name and logo were announced, along with three other teams (Glacier Boyz, Beasts, and Wild Aces). On January 14, 2021, all four team uniforms were revealed.

== 2021 Season V1.0 ==
On December 30, 2020, It was announced that former Heisman Trophy Winner Johnny Manziel had signed with the Zappers.

The Zappers lost their first franchise game 48–44 against the Beasts on February 13, 2021.

On February 27, 2021, it was announced that Josh Gordon had signed with the Zappers after being suspended indefinitely by the NFL.

The Zappers finished the regular season 2–2, securing the #2 seed in the playoffs, but ultimately lost to the #2 seed Wild Aces 32–6 in the semifinals, finishing the 2021 Fan Controlled Football season 2–3.

== Roster ==
2022 FCF Zappers final roster
Quarterbacks 2 Johnny Manziel 4 Logan Marchi 10 Braden Smith Running backs . 30 Anthony Jones Wide receivers . 13 Travis Toivonen 14 Treydonte Hill Tight ends . Block Party	Offensive linemen Block Party Defensive linemen . Shut Down Squad	Linebackers Shut Down Squad Defensive backs . Shut Down Squad 23 Marquill Osborne Special teams . Vacant	Reserve lists Vacant Rights list . Vacant 22 Active, 0 Inactive

== 2022 season ==
For 2022, Manziel agreed to return to the team as a player-coach. The team used its other franchise tag to sign Terrell Owens, a Pro Football Hall of Fame wide receiver who last played professionally in 2012. Before Week 5 began, fans were asked to vote on a proposed trade that would send Owens, along with the 1st and 16th picks in that week's draft, to the Beasts in exchange for quarterback Jason Stewart and the 5th and 10th picks in the upcoming draft. The trade was accepted, making it the first trade in league history.

The franchise won its third game in team history, and first of the season in Week 5, defeating the year-one champions, the Shoulda Been Stars, 28–24.

After beginning the season with an 0–4 record, the Zappers completed a turnaround and advanced to the playoffs. They defeated Bored Ape FC 42–24 in the People's Championship v2.0 to win the 2022 Fan Controlled Football title. Quarterback Kelly Bryant was named the championship game's MVP after completing 11 of 13 passes for 114 yards and a touchdown while also rushing for 58 yards and three touchdowns. Manziel did not play in the championship game.

Late in the fourth quarter, with approximately 30 seconds remaining and Bored Ape FC facing fourth-and-11, Zappers defensive lineman Armond Lloyd recorded a sack that forced a turnover on downs and returned possession to the Zappers to help secure the victory. Lloyd credited his teammates for the play, stating that the linebackers sealed the running back, allowing him to break through for the sack.
