= Pullman Yard =

Historic building in Atlanta

Coordinates: 33.7577°N 84.3286°W

- Pratt-Pullman Yard
- U.S. Historic district – Contributing property
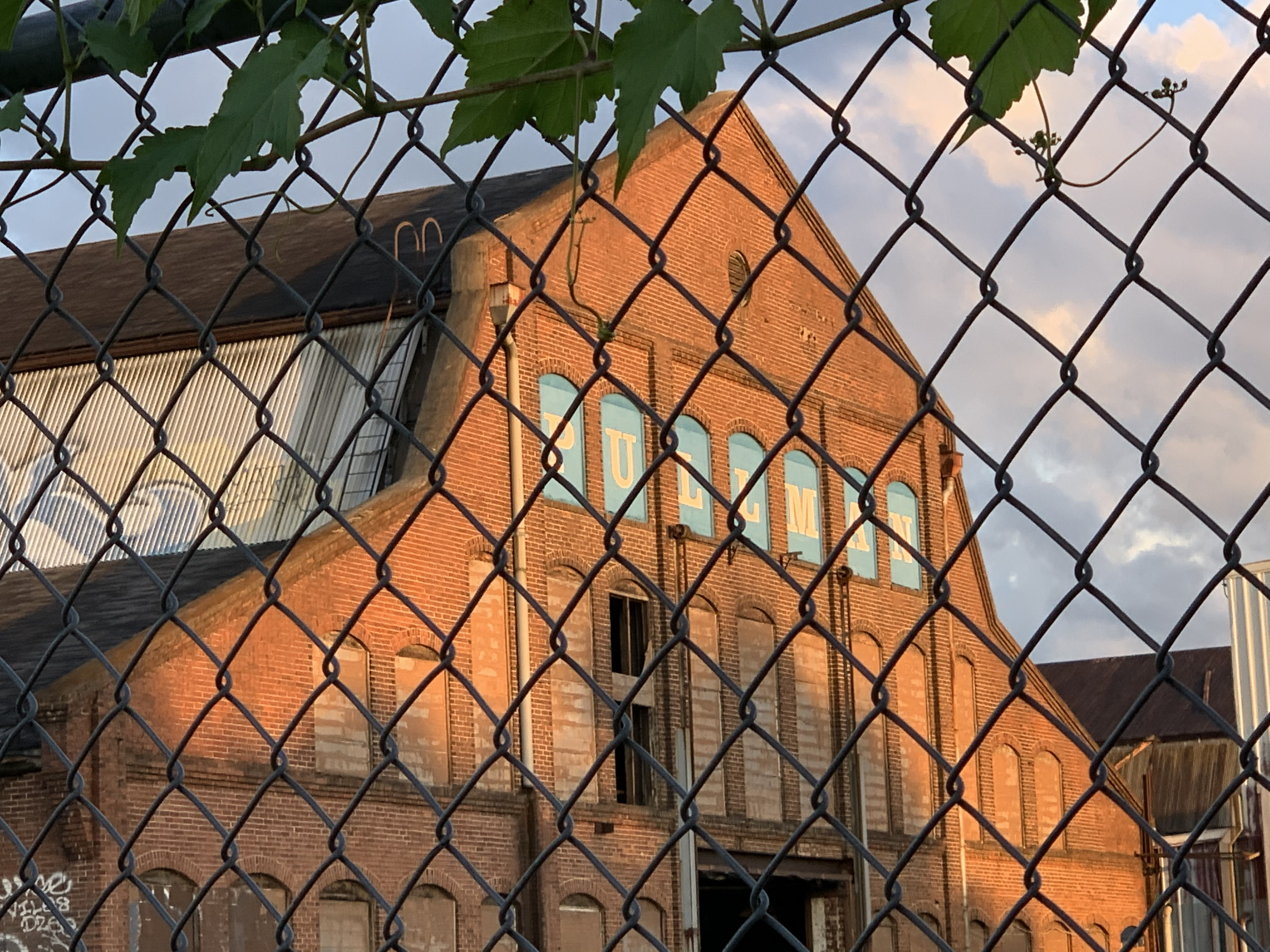
- The restored building in 2020
- Location: Atlanta, Georgia, United States
- Built: 1904
- Website: www.pullmanyards.com
- Part of: Kirkwood Historic District (ID09000749)
- Designated CP: September 24, 2009

District Pullman Yard or Pullman Yards is a former industrial complex in the Kirkwood neighborhood of Atlanta that is now an entertainment and residential district. As Pratt-Pullman Yard, the 27-acre site is a contributing property to the 2009 designation of the Kirkwood Historic District on the National Register of Historic Places.

== History ==
Pratt Engineering Company purchased what was then farmland in 1904 to build a sugar and fertilizer processing plant. The company made fertilizer bombs during World War I. In 1926, the Pullman Company purchased the property to manufacture and repair its railroad sleeper cars. They spent $1,000,000 (equivalent to about $23,483,000 in 2025) on renovations. In 1955, Southern Iron and Equipment Company purchased the yard and continued to manufacture and repair train cars.

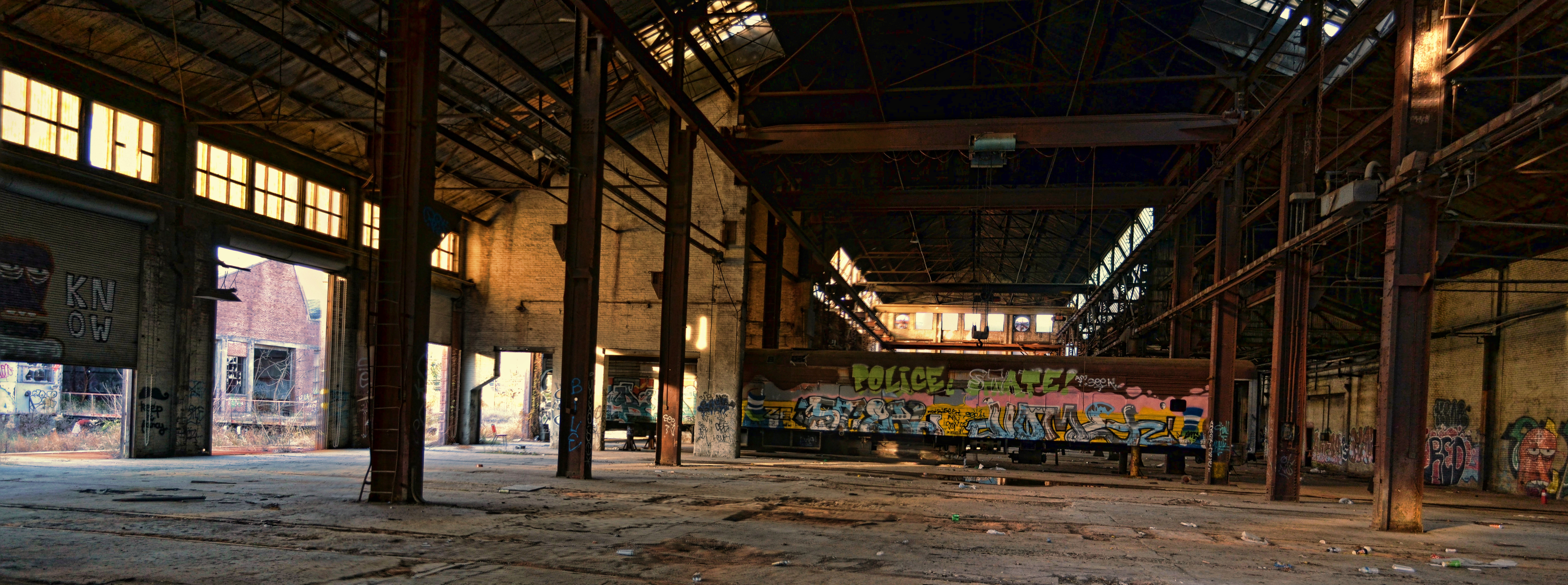
The interior in 2011 with graffiti

The site was placed on the Atlanta Preservation Center's endangered places list in 2001 and federally recognized in 2009. In 2017, Atomic Entertainment purchased the complex with redevelopment plans. In 2017, the Atlanta Urban Design Commission nominated the historic site as a landmark site.

== Filming location ==
The Pullman Yard has been the filming location of many movies and television series. Projects shot on site include:

- Brooklyn (HBO)
- Amazing Stories
- American Soul
- Baby Driver
- Bad Boys for Life
- Black Lightning
- Boss Level
- Divergent
- Doom Patrol
- Good Girls
- Instant Family
- Kevin (Probably) Saves the World
- MacGyver
- Revolution of One
- So You Think You Can Dance (season 18)
- Step Up (Season 2)
- The Hunger Games
- The Originals
- The Outsider
- The Resident
- Valor
- Ford Motor Company commercial
- Georgia Power commercial
- Janelle Monáe Bustle event
- Lil Yachty for Monday Night Football
- Fast and Furious 5
