= 2006 Miami Valley Silverbacks season =

- Head coach: Matt King
- Home stadium: Hobart Arena

Results
- Record: 5-9
- Division place: 6th
- Playoffs: DNQ

The team began play in 2006 as the Miami Valley Silverbacks, an expansion member of the American Indoor Football League (AIFL). On Saturday, March 25, 2006, WR/DB Maurice Lee managed to set five AIFL wide receiver records, en route to his team's 57–54 Week 5 road victory over the Steubenville Stampede. He set the records for most catches (16), most reception yards (191), most receiving touchdowns (7), most points (42), and total touchdowns (7). The team finished 5-9 in their expansion season, earning a berth in the AIFL playoffs before losing in the first round. After the season four Silverbacks were named to the AIFL ProStar Team.

== Schedule ==
Date	Opponent	Home/Away	Result
March 6	Syracuse Soldiers	Away	Won 54-30
March 11	Huntington Heroes	Away	Lost 13-62
March 25	Steubenville Stampede	Away	Won 57-54
April 1	Reading Express	Home	Lost 44-61
April 8	Canton Legends	Home	Won 44-28
April 15	Erie Freeze	Home	Lost 28-58
April 22	Johnstown Riverhawks	Away	Lost 20-38
April 29	Steubenville Stampede	Home	Won 73-28
May 6	Johnstown Riverhawks	Home	Lost 26-33
May 13	Huntington Heroes	Home	Lost 45-53
May 20	Steubenville Stampede	Home	Won 40-21
May 27	Erie Freeze	Away	Lost 29-54
June 3	Reading Express	Away	Lost 14-73
June 8	Canton Legends	Away	Lost 28-50

== Standings ==
Team	Overall		
Team	Wins	Losses	Percentage
Northern Conference
Reading Express	12	2	0.857
Canton Legends	10	4	0.714
Erie Freeze	10	4	0.857
Huntington Heroes	9	5	0.642
Johnstown Riverhawks	8	6	0.571
Miami Valley Silverbacks	5	9	0.357
Steubenville Stampede	2	14	0.142
Syracuse Soldiers	1	10	0.090
*Columbus Blackhawks	0	1	0.000
*Philadelphia Scorpions	0	1	0.000
*Cumberland Valley Cardinals	0	2	0.000
Southern Conference
Rome Renegades	12	2	0.857
Richmond Bandits	12	2	0.857
Raleigh Rebels	8	6	0.571
Chattahoochee Valley Vipers	8	6	0.571
Daytona Beach Thunder	6	8	0.428
Augusta Spartans	6	8	0.571
Florence Phantoms	4	10	0.285
**AIFL Ghostchasers	0	5	0.000
Carolina Ghostriders	0	11	0.000

- Green indicates clinched playoff berth
- Purple indicates division champion
- Grey indicates best league record
- During regular season, all teams played within their conference.
- * = Filled in for games, due to Syracuse folding during the season. All three of these teams were outdoor amateur teams in the North American Football League.
- ** = Played remainder of Ghostriders road games, due to team folding during season.
