= List of professional sports teams in Iowa =

Iowa is the 31st most populated state in the United States and has a rich history of professional sports.

== Active teams ==
Arena football
League	Team	City	Arena	Capacity
IFL	Iowa Barnstormers	Des Moines	Casey's Center	15,181
NAL	Sioux City Bandits	Sioux City	Tyson Events Center	6,941
Baseball
League	Team	City	Stadium	Capacity
IL (AAA)	Iowa Cubs	Des Moines	Principal Park	11,500
MWL (High-A)	Cedar Rapids Kernels	Cedar Rapids	Veterans Memorial Stadium	5,300
MWL (High-A)	Quad Cities River Bandits	Davenport	Modern Woodmen Park	4,024
AAPB (Ind.)	Sioux City Explorers	Sioux City	MercyOne Field at Lewis and Clark Park	3,800
Basketball
League	Team	City	Arena	Capacity
G-League	Iowa Wolves	Des Moines	Casey's Center	16,110
Ice hockey
League	Team	City	Arena	Capacity
AHL	Iowa Wild	Des Moines	Casey's Center	15,181
ECHL	Iowa Heartlanders	Coralville	Xtream Arena	4,878

=== Map of cities with a professional sports team ===
Location with a professional sports team

== See also ==
- Sports in Iowa
