= 2006 American Indoor Football League season =

2006 American Indoor Football Association season
- League: American Indoor Football Association
- Sport: Indoor football

America Bowl II
- Champions: Canton Legends
- Runners-up: Rome Renegades

AIFL seasons
- ← 2005 2007 →

The 2006 American Indoor Football League was the league's 2nd overall season. The league champions were the Canton Legends, who defeated the Rome Renegades in American Bowl II.

== Standings ==
Team	Overall		
Team	Wins	Losses	Percentage
Northern Conference
Reading Express	12	2	0.857
Canton Legends	10	4	0.714
Erie Freeze	10	4	0.857
Huntington Heroes	9	5	0.642
Johnstown Riverhawks	8	6	0.571
Miami Valley Silverbacks	5	9	0.357
Steubenville Stampede	2	14	0.142
Syracuse Soldiers	1	10	0.090
*Columbus Blackhawks	0	1	0.000
*Philadelphia Scorpions	0	1	0.000
*Cumberland Valley Cardinals	0	2	0.000
Southern Conference
Rome Renegades	12	2	0.857
Richmond Bandits	12	2	0.857
Raleigh Rebels	8	6	0.571
Chattahoochee Valley Vipers	8	6	0.571
Daytona Beach Thunder	6	8	0.428
Augusta Spartans	6	8	0.571
Florence Phantoms	4	10	0.285
**AIFL Ghostchasers	0	5	0.000
Carolina Ghostriders	0	11	0.000

- Green indicates clinched playoff berth
- Purple indicates division champion
- Grey indicates best league record
- During regular season, all teams played within their conference.
- * = Filled in for games, due to Syracuse folding during the season. All three of these teams were outdoor amateur teams in the North American Football League.
- ** = Played remainder of Ghostriders road games, due to team folding during season.

== Playoffs ==
Conference Semifinals
3	Erie	45
2	Canton	54
4	Huntington	23
1	Reading	57
3	Raleigh*	2
2	Richmond	0
4	Chattahoochee Valley	39
1	Rome	64

Conference Championships
2	Canton	44
1	Reading	24
3	Raleigh	14
1	Rome	63

American Bowl II
N2	Canton	61
S1	Rome	40

*=Forfeit win
