= 2005 Atlantic Indoor Football League season =

- League: Atlantic Indoor Football League
- Sport: Indoor football
- Duration: April 16, 2005 - July 17, 2005

Regular season
- Season champions: Erie Freeze
- Season MVP: David Dinkins (Erie)

Playoffs
- Semifinals champions: Erie Freeze
- Semifinals runners-up: Canton Legends
- Semifinals champions: Richmond Bandits
- Semifinals runners-up: Johnstown Riverhawks

America Bowl I
- Champions: Richmond Bandits
- Runners-up: Erie Freeze

AIFL seasons
- ← N/A 2006 →

The 2005 Atlantic Indoor Football League season was the league's first overall season. The league champions were the Richmond Bandits, who defeated the Erie Freeze in American Bowl I.

== Standings ==
Team	Wins	Losses	Percentage
Erie Freeze	9	1	0.900
Richmond Bandits	9	1	0.900
Johnstown Riverhawks	6	4	0.600
Canton Legends	3	7	0.300
Raleigh Rebels	3	7	0.300
Greensboro Ghostriders	0	10	0.000

- Green indicates clinched playoff berth
- Black indicates best regular season record

== Playoffs ==
Quarterfinals
6	Greensboro	14
3	Johnstown	73
5	Raleigh	54
4	Canton	70

Semifinals
3	Johnstown	40
2	Richmond	50
4	Canton	58
1	Erie	73

American Bowl I
2	Richmond	56
1	Erie	30
