= Odessa Drillers =

Professional indoor football team

Logo

General information
- Founded: 2025
- Headquartered: Odessa, Texas
- Colors: Blue, black, silver
- OdessaDrillers.com

Personnel
- Owner: Community-Owned
- Head coach: Brandon Henderson

Team history
- Odessa Drillers (2026-present)

Home fields
- Ector County Coliseum (2026-present)

League / conference affiliations
- American Indoor Football (2026–present)

The Odessa Drillers are a professional indoor football team based in Odessa, Texas. They are current members of American Indoor Football. They were founded in 2025 as an expansion team known as the Odessa Drillers and initially played their home games at the Ector County Coliseum starting in 2026.

== History ==
Previous logo/third version (2025)

=== American Indoor Football (2026–present) ===
On September 3, 2025, the league welcomed the franchise as its sixth team and latest expansion team under the ownership of Richard Rodgers to have been known as the Tyler Crude, however they were not initially able to get an arena lease with the Oil Palace due to the arena facing auction. As a result, on October 7, 2025, the league announced the team would be placed in Odessa, Texas and rebranded as the Odessa Drillers. They are the first team to play in the city since the West Texas Warbirds/Desert Hawks played briefly in the failed revival of the Arena Football League in 2024 before folding. The team is set to play their home games at the Ector County Coliseum. AIF commissioner Larry Clark is quoted as saying, "We're excited to bring professional indoor football back to Odessa and to welcome Drillers to the AIF family. The Ector County Coliseum is a unique and iconic venue, and we look forward to seeing it rocking with Drillers fans in 2026."

Longtime arena/indoor football player/coach Terrence Foster was named the first head coach, but stepped down to become the new commissioner of the AIF. Shortly after, the team named Brandon Henderson as their head coach. (Foster would later join their rival Midland Frac-Attack as part of the "Battle For The Basin Series" rivalry referencing the Permian Basin.)

As of April 2026, Fort Stockton High School (Fort Stockton, Texas) broadcast class/internet channel Tumbleweed+ began carrying Drillers home games on their Facebook and YouTube channels. The staff includes adult commentators and a staff consisting totally of high school students, a first for professional sports.

The Drillers' season ended in July 2026 as the team was hired to serve as replacement players for the Kentucky Barrels of Arena Football One.

In July 2026, the Drillers' social media account was hacked and repurposed for an unrelated franchise, the Wyoming Wranglers; the Drillers used another social media account to denounce the hacking and dispelled claims that the franchise was relocating.
