= North Michigan Muskies =

Professional indoor football team

Logo

General information
- Founded: 2023
- Folded: 2026
- Headquartered: Traverse City, Michigan
- Colors: Moss green, sea green, white
- NorthMichiganMuskies.com

Personnel
- Owners: Dominic Montero; Drake Roach
- General manager: Lawerance Peters
- Head coach: Lawerance Peters

Team history
- RiverCity Rage (2024); Coralville Chaos (2025); North Michigan Muskies (2026)

Home fields
- Xtream Arena (2025); Howe Ice Arena (2026, never played)

League / conference affiliations
- American Indoor Football (2024–2026); Independent (2026-present)

The North Michigan Muskies were a professional indoor football team originally based in Traverse City, Michigan. They are owned by Dominic Montero and Drake Roach. They started as members of American Indoor Football before going independent. They were founded in 2023 as the expansion version of the RiverCity Rage. They were set to start in Council Bluffs, Iowa, and play at the Mid-America Center for 2024, however, relocated to Coralville, Iowa, and decided to rebrand as the Coralville Chaos for the 2025 season. Despite making it to the 2025 AIF Championship, they relocated to Traverse City, Michigan, and rebranded as the Muskies. They were to have played their home games at the Howe Ice Arena starting in 2026, but after one road game, their membership in the league was terminated in February of the same year and were declared an independent team. They are currently in search of a new league along with former AIF mates the Wyoming Cavalry.

== History ==
=== Brief "RiverCity Rage" revival, then rebranding as the Coralville Chaos (2024-2025) ===
Coralville Chaos (2025)

The franchise was initially going be to named the RiverCity Rage after a former indoor football franchise that played in several leagues between 2001 and 2009. This expansion version of the Rage would take the field in 2025 under new ownership of Dominic Montero (also owner of the then-Cedar Rapids River Kings) and were announced as one of the newest members of the relaunched American Indoor Football league. They initially announced that they would be playing at the Mid-America Center in Council Bluffs for 2024. However, due to careful analysis of the financial outlook of the team—and the Arena Football League's laying stake to Council Bluffs by establishing the Iowa Rampage there (a team that would ultimately never play there)—the Rage announced that they will play in the AIF starting in the 2025 season at the Xtream Arena in Coralville, rebranding themselves the Coralville Chaos on March 26, 2024. On March 28, the Chaos hired arena football veteran Frank Haege, two-time af2 champion with the original Quad City Steamwheelers, as the team's general manager. The team initially announced former Washington Wolfpack special teams coach Curtis Williams as the team's first head coach, but was terminated following an arrest.

On Valentine's Day 2025, the Chaos made their debut on the road at the West Michigan Ironmen losing 75–7. On that same weekend, the Chaos named Wisconsin Aviators owner/head coach Lawerance Peters as their new head coach. The Chaos made it to the 2025 AIF Championship Game against the Ironmen in their inaugural season played on May 3, 2025, only to lose to the Ironmen 76–24.

=== Move to Michigan, rebranding as the Muskies and Dormancy (2026) ===
On July 24, 2025, Chaos ownership announced on their website and Facebook that they were relocating their franchise to Traverse City, Michigan, and are rebranding themselves as the North Michigan Muskies after just one season in Coralville. Despite making it to the AIF Championship, they planned to play their home games at the Howe Ice Arena at the Grand Traverse County Civic Center in Traverse City. The team also announced that Tom Lewis would become their new part-owner, general manager and head coach. On August 25, 2025, Lewis announced he left the team as head coach and general manager to help relaunch the Lone Star Football League in Texas. Just days later, the team named former Battle Creek Smoke owner/GM/coach Jake Shanks as the team's new general manager and Shawn Eastridge (currently of the Indianapolis Enforcers and previously offensive coordinator for the Chaos) became the team's new head coach, however stepped down months later. Lawerance Peters, who previous coached the team as the Chaos, returned as head coach shortly afterward.

After playing one road game against the West Michigan Ironmen, the Muskies' membership with the AIF was terminated on February 20, 2026, effective immediately following a formal League compliance review and Executive Committee vote. The decision follows the expiration of a previously issued Notice of Material Breach. After review of the matter and in accordance with League governing documents, the Executive Committee determined that termination of franchise membership was necessary to uphold League operational standards and protect the integrity of the 2026 AIF season. The league also announced that the Pennsylvania Union, an AIF-affiliated road team for 2026 would assume of all the Muskies' road contests for the other AIF teams so that no major adjustments would be made. The Muskies were brought back for one night only against the Wyoming Cavalry on March 28th, however, the team featured several Cavalry players to fill the void left following the departure of several previously signed Muskie players. The Cavalry won 44-12. The Muskies have been declared an independent team and joins the Cavalry in searching for a new league.

== Season-by-season ==
League champions	Conference champions	Division champions	Playoff berth	League leader

Season	Team	League	Conference	Division	Regular season			Postseason results
Season	Team	League	Conference	Division	Finish	Wins	Losses	Postseason results
2023	Dormant year							
2024	Dormant year							
2025	2025	AIF			2nd	3	2	Lost 2025 AIF Championship to West Michigan
2026	2026	AIF			N/A	0	1	AIF membership terminated; declared independent
Totals						3	2	All-time regular season record
Totals						0	1	All-time postseason record
Totals						3	3	All-time regular season and postseason record
