= Wyoming Cavalry (2026-) =

Professional arena football team

Logo

General information
- Founded: 2025
- Headquartered: Gillette, Wyoming
- Colors: Navy blue, Old gold, White
- WYCavalry.com

Personnel
- Owners: Dominic Montero; Drake Roach
- Head coach: Ken Hessler
- President: Drake Roach

Team history
- Wyoming Cavalry (2026–present)

Home fields
- CAM-PLEX Wyoming Center (2026–present)

League / conference affiliations
- American Indoor Football (2026); Pacific Indoor Football League (2027–present)

The Wyoming Cavalry are a professional indoor football team based in Gillette, Wyoming. They play their home games at the Wyoming Center at the CAM-PLEX in Gillette. They started in 2026 as members of American Indoor Football, but have since joined the Pacific Indoor Football League. They are owned by Dominic Montero (former owner of the Cedar Rapids Titans) and Drake Roach (former co-owner of the Coralville Chaos). Their current head coach is Ken Hessler.

== History ==
=== The New Cavalry, American Indoor Football and expulsion (2026) ===
Originally planned logo

American Indoor Football co-owner Dominic Montero, also owner of the Cedar Rapids River Kings (now the Titans) and Coralville Chaos (later the now-defunct North Michigan Muskies), announced the founding and addition of the expansion Wyoming Cavalry to the league to begin play in the 2026 season. The team would be based in Gillette, Wyoming, and are expected to play their home games at Wyoming Center at the CAM-PLEX in Gillette replacing the since-folded Gillette Mustangs, formerly of Champions Indoor Football. In an interview with KCRG-TV in Cedar Rapids, representatives with Cedar Rapids and Coralville originally indicated plans to revive the Mustangs, but to avoid legal challenges (Steven Titus, the chairman of Arena Football One, owns the rights to that name), opted to adopt the Cavalry name instead with the Mustang colors of sage green and Vegas gold. The official website and Facebook profile were launched in March 2025. The official announcement was released on March 28, 2025, and a press conference took place on May 1, 2025, in Gillette.

The Cavalry are named after the original Wyoming Cavalry franchise that played in several leagues including the original Indoor Football League in 2000, National Indoor Football League from 2001 to 2007, the then-American Indoor Football Association (now the AIF) from 2008 to 2010 and finally the current Indoor Football League from 2011 to 2014 before folding. Mike and Argeri Layton, who owned the original incarnation of the Wyoming Cavalry, have given their approval to the new franchise.

Second planned logo

The Cavalry would become the fourth franchise to join the existing AIF league with Cedar Rapids, Coralville and the West Michigan Ironmen for 2026. (The Pennsylvania Union would join shortly after.) On May 1, 2025, in addition to the Cavalry officially being announced as the league's fourth franchise in the league, the team announced that Ken Hessler would be the team's first official head coach. As of July 2025, Montero and team president (and then-new sole owner of the Coralville Chaos) Drake Roach are now listed as co-owners of the Cavalry. The team colors were changed back to those of the original franchise, navy blue, old gold and white, on September 18, 2025. Beginning February 14, 2026, Cavalry home games began being live streamed on Omni-Digital Productions, LLC on Facebook and YouTube. Beginning February 19, 2026, all Calvary live streams would re-air on delay regionally on internet television station KSQU-TV Channel 8Y Yreka/Mount Shasta, California online and on Roku as a way to help promote the league and the team and help encourage expansion west.

==== Fights, league violations, AIF suspension and leaving AIF ====
Several incidents took place within one and a half months that led to the team's abrupt departure from the AIF on March 29, 2026. On Valentine's Day, February 14th, Cavalry hosted the then-independent Central New York Blue Devils in a non-league contest which ended with the Cavalry winning their first game in team history 56-0. During the game, Cavalry owner/player Dominic Montero was ejected from the game for involvement in a fight with a CNY player. He was suspended for one game and fined for violations of league rules. Just over a month later, the team traveled to Cedar Rapids to take on Montero's former team, the Cedar Rapids Titans. With Montero serving his suspension, the two teams faced off in a heated contest that ended up in a fight in the Cavalry bench area when a Cedar Rapids assistant coach appeared to have blindsided Cavalry co-owner/team president Drake Roach and dragged him into the hallway and locker room area. That led to several Cedar Rapids players leaping over the bench to apparently break up the altercation and the game being called by the officials with 10:51 left in the third quarter with the Cavalry winning 14-12 by league rules. The Titans' assistant coach was suspended for the remainder of the season with a chance to be reinstated for 2027, seven Titans players were suspended two games and one Titans player for one game for jumping over the wall, which is a violation of league rules. One Cavalry player was suspended for one game, Roach was fined for game operations violations and the entire franchise was fined for gameday operation violations. Then finally, on March 28th, the Cavalry played in a game that was an inner squad match-up with a team called the North Michigan Muskies, another Montero-owned team that had their membership terminated in mid-February. That game ended with the Cavalry winning 44-12. However, the league announced that they had suspended the Cavalry for the remainder of the season "effective immediately" for ongoing violations of league rules and policy.

The league stated, "The decision follows a league review in which the organization was determined to be out of compliance with AIF operational standards and league requirements. The team was previously issued a formal compliance notice outlining required corrective actions; however, those requirements were not satisfied. Additionally, the organization did not adhere to league mandates regarding the handling of its scheduled Saturday night game."

Following the league's press release, the Cavalry announced on their Facebook page that they were leaving the AIF "effective immediately" and plan to play the rest of the season on an independent schedule with new opponents citing that they followed all league protocols and that league opponents "refused to travel to Wyoming to play against them".

Though the AIF left an opening for the Cavalry to return in 2027 if the team came back into compliance, Montero and Roach indicated unwillingness to do so and blamed the expulsion on teams not wanting to travel to Gillette. "The Wyoming Cavalry league opponents refuse to travel to Gillette, effective immediately we are leaving American Indoor Football 3-0. All remaining games will continue with alternate opponents over the next three weeks," said Cavalry ownership. Montero and Roach have vowed to play out their arena lease for the 2026 season and join a new league in 2027.

This was the third time a Montero-owned team had been expelled from AIF. Previously first in 2024, Montero's Cedar Rapids River Kings were released from the league following similar allegations of irregularities. Montero's return to AIF was only facilitiated by all of the other remaining teams (and AIF co-founder John Morris) leaving the league and Montero claiming the AIF brand for his own league. The second was the aforementioned termination of the membership for the North Michigan Muskies in February 2026.

In interviews with the Gillette News-Record released on April 1, Montero and AIF Commissioner Terence Foster struck more conciliatory tones over the incidents, with Montero acknowledging that players had been drinking alcohol during the game, and Foster specifying that the irregularities pertained to issues such as padding on the dasher boards, and unsafe turf that still bore the branding of a previous franchise against AIF regulations, which Montero expressed a willingness to fix. Foster also stated that he was willing to give Montero benefit of the doubt regarding his prior expulsions, noting that he may have been stretched too thin operating the Cavalry, Muskies and previously being in the league office. Both parties noted that Gillette had been a successful market for the league, with the Cavalry continuing to draw over 2,000 fans to their games as the previous incarnation of the team had done.

On March 30, 2026, Ken Hessler resigned from his position as head coach of the Wyoming Cavalry along with his entire staff. On April 2th, assistant head coach Cody Hommedahl stepped into the role of interim head coach for the remainder of the season. On April 15th, the team announced for Carolina Cobras and Omaha Beef head coach/GM Brandon Negron as their new head coach and team president per the team's website. Then on April 26th, Negron left the Cavalry to become general manager of the Colorado Spartans of the National Arena League. On April 29th, the team announced on their Facebook that Ken Hessler would return as head coach.

The AIF (by then taken over by West Michigan Ironmen owner Mario Flores) confirmed following the 2026 season that it had no intentions of including the Cavalry in their 2026 schedule, mainly due to travel expenses. The team was formally expelled August 25, 2026, with Foster explicitly remarking that Montero would not be allowed to use the AIF brand in future endeavors.

=== Pacific Indoor Football League (2027) ===
On October 27, 2026, the Cavalry were announced as members of the Pacific Indoor Football League.

== Current roster ==
Wyoming Cavalry roster
Quarterbacks: Currently vacant; Running backs: Currently vacant; Wide receivers: Anthony Ellison; Cameron Terry	Offensive linemen: Currently vacant; Defensive linemen: Currently vacant	Linebackers: Currently vacant; Defensive backs: Currently vacant; Special teams: Currently vacant	Reserve lists: Currently vacant; Rookies in italics; updated March 27, 2025; 0 Active, 0 Inactive

== Staff ==
Source: Team website

Wyoming Cavalry staff
Front office: Owner – Dominic Montero, Drake Roach; President – Drake Roach; General manager – TBA; Head coaches: Head coach – Ken Hessler; Assistant Head Coach - Vacant; Offensive coaches: Offensive coordinator – Vacant; Offensive line coach - Vacant	Defensive coaches: Defensive coordinator – Vacant; Defensive line coach - Vacant; Secondary & linebackers coach - Vacant
