= Coralville, Iowa =

- City
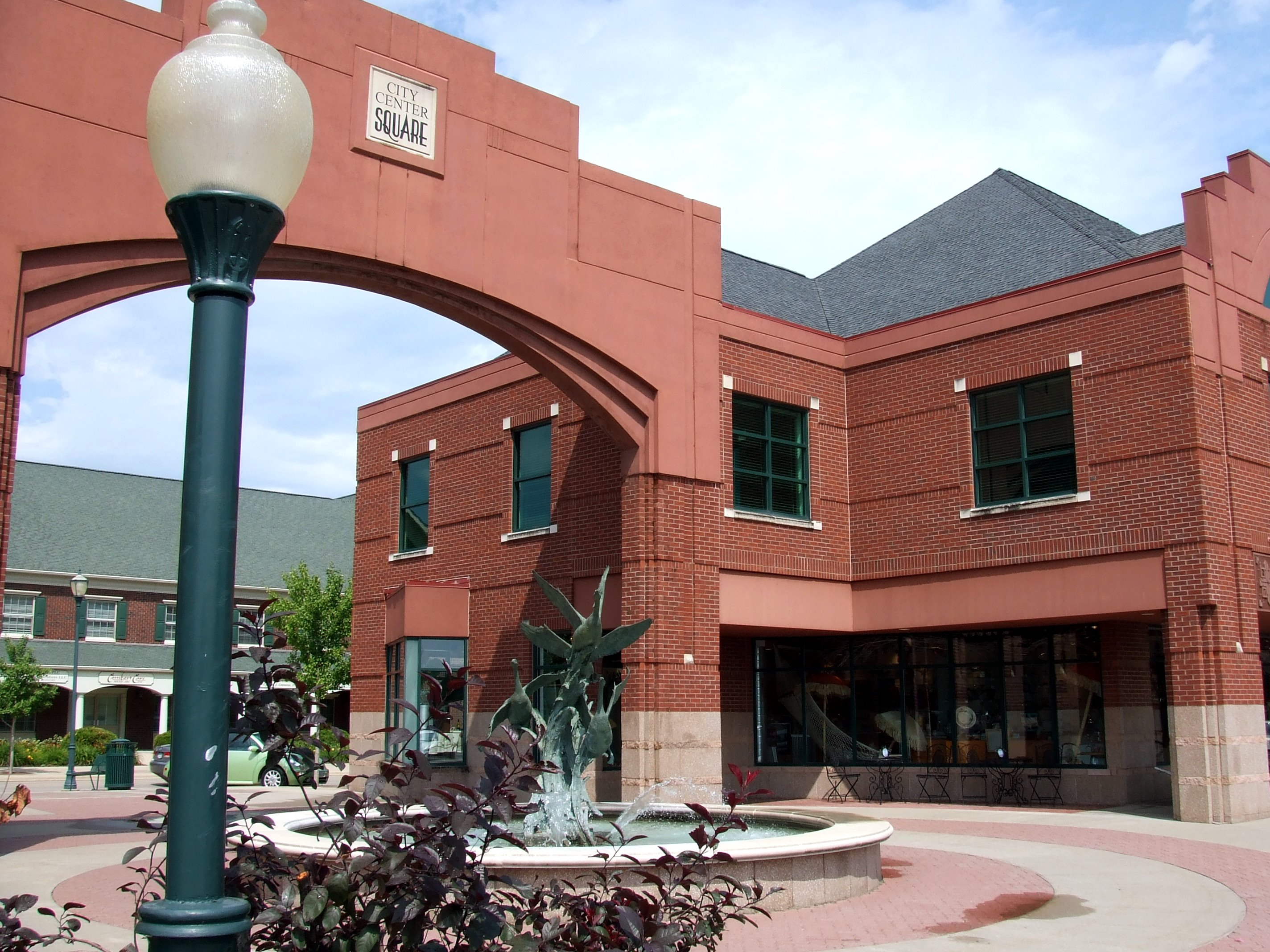
- City Center Square in downtown Coralville

- Seal
- Nickname: CoralVegas
- Location of Coralville, Iowa
- Coordinates: 41°42′10″N 91°37′12″W
- Country: United States
- State: Iowa
- County: Johnson
- Metro: Iowa City Metropolitan Area
- Incorporated: November 22, 1873

Government
  - Type: Council–manager

Area
  - Total: 12.67 sq mi (32.82 km^{2})
  - Land: 12.60 sq mi (32.64 km^{2})
  - Water: 0.069 sq mi (0.18 km^{2})
- Elevation: 758 ft (231 m)

Population (2020)
  - Total: 22,318
  - Rank: 23rd in Iowa
  - Density: 1,771.1/sq mi (683.83/km^{2})
- Time zone: UTC-6 (Central (CST))
  - Summer (DST): UTC-5 (CDT)
- ZIP code: 52241
- Area code: 319
- FIPS code: 19-16230
- GNIS feature ID: 2393633
- Website: www.coralville.org

Coralville is a city in Johnson County, Iowa, United States. It is a suburb of Iowa City and part of the Iowa City Metropolitan Statistical Area. The population was 22,318 at the 2020 census.

== History ==
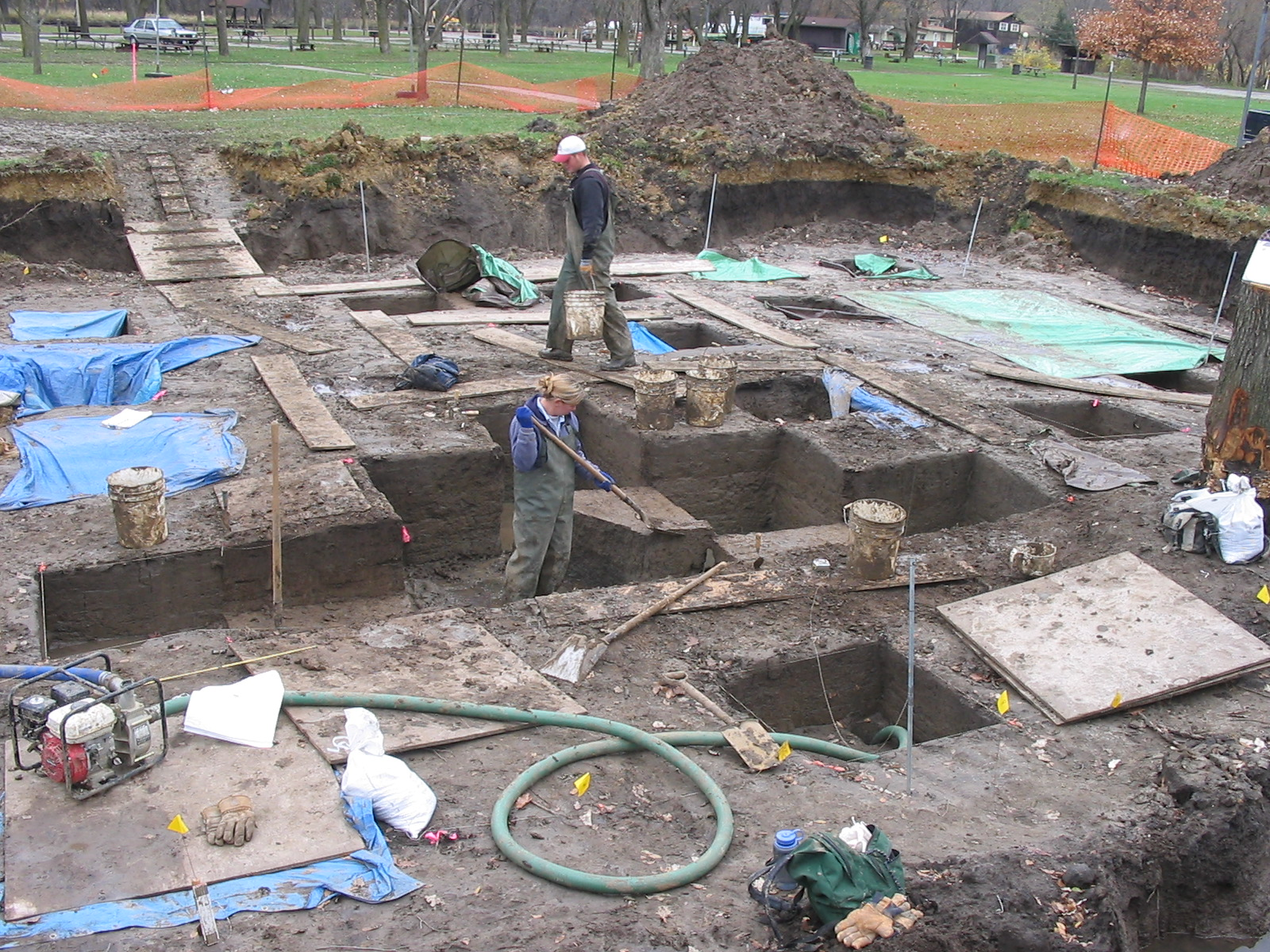
Excavations at the Late Archaic Edgewater Park Site; courtesy OSA.

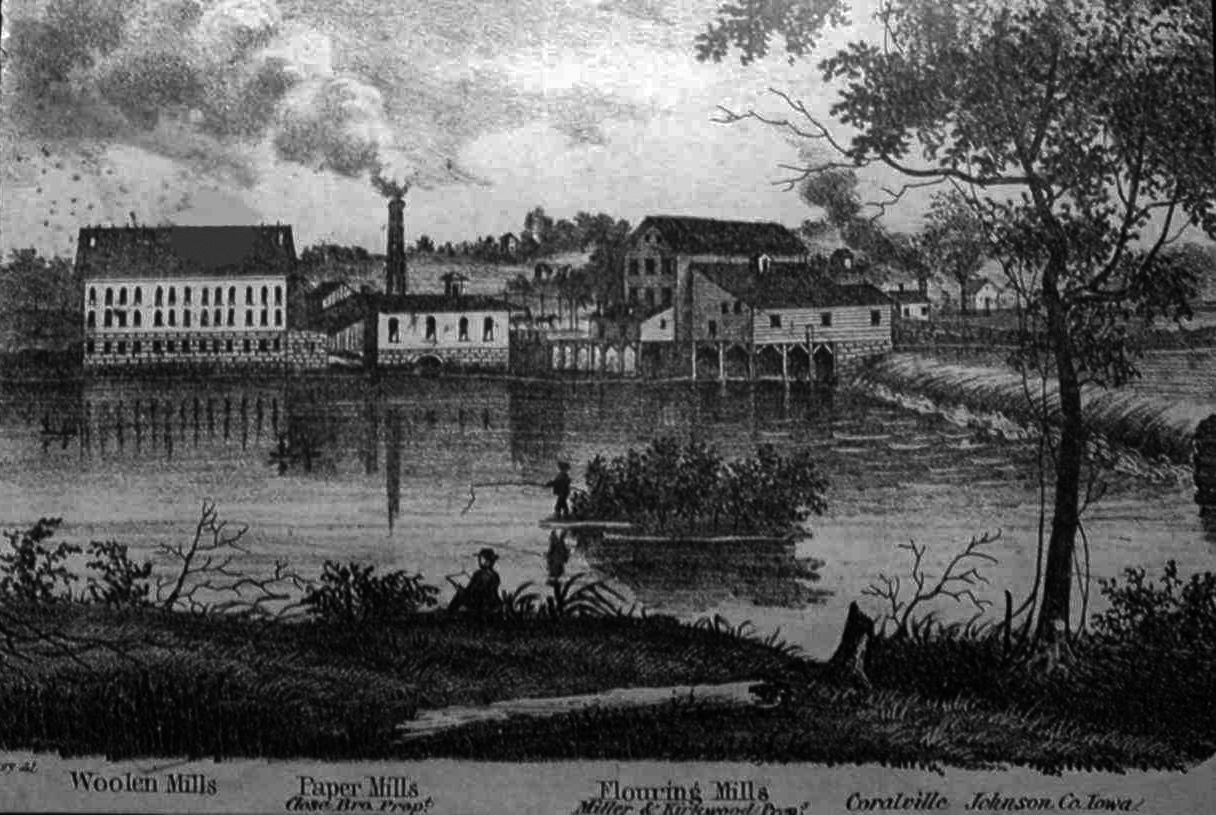
Coralville mills in 1870.

Coralville is the location of the Edgewater Park Site, a 3,800-year-old archaeological site along the Iowa River. Edgewater is the oldest site in Iowa with evidence of domesticated plant use.

Coralville incorporated as a city on June 1, 1857. The city's name is derived from the fossils that are found in the limestone along the Iowa River. In 1864, Louis Agassiz, a Harvard University zoologist, gave a lecture at the nearby University of Iowa titled "The Coral Reefs of Iowa City". During the lecture, he presented local samples of fossilized Devonian period coral. The lecture was well received and helped raise public interest in the local fossils. In 1866, more corals were discovered at the site of a new mill, inspiring the citizens of the area to name the settlement "Coralville". The first mill at Coralville was built in 1844, and in the years that followed, a number of watermills were powered by the Coralville mill dam along the Iowa River, but all of the mills had closed by 1900, except for a low-head hydroelectric plant that remained in operation until the mid 20th century.

Coralville is also the location where some 1300 Mormon emigrants stopped to make camp in their migration of 1856 after having traveled west by rail to Iowa City, which was the westernmost rail terminus at the time. They built handcarts out of native woods during their encampment so that an adult could haul a 600–700 pound load and cover about 15 miles per day on foot in their continuing trek to Salt Lake City. A historical marker commemorating the Mormon Handcart Brigade was erected in 1936 by the Iowa Society DAR, with members of the Pilgrim Chapter present. Originally placed just south of 5th Street and west of 10th Street, it was moved in 1998 to S. T. Morrison Park and rededicated by the Nathaniel Fellows Chapter, placed near the entrance and pond. Today, the Mormon Handcart Park and Nature Preserve commemorates the site. An arterial road, Mormon Trek Boulevard, also recognizes the Mormons handcart pioneers.

After World War II, Coralville began to grow as many University of Iowa students, faculty, and staff began to make their homes there. It had only 433 people in 1940, but by 1970 Coralville's population had jumped to 6,130. The construction of Interstate 80 in the 1960s brought several motels, fast-food restaurants, and gas stations to Coralville.

By the mid-1960s, the independent school district of Coralville was annexed by the Iowa City Community School District. Junior and senior high school students rode buses into Iowa City. Elementary (K-6) students attended Central Elementary School. Kirkwood Elementary school was opened in the fall of 1964, giving the growing town its second school. By the fall of 1968, all high school students from Coralville began attending the newly opened Iowa City West High School. In 1971, the district built Northwest Junior High on property just to the south of Kirkwood Elementary, which then began handling seventh and eighth graders who lived west of the Iowa River. In 1997, Wickham Elementary School was opened.

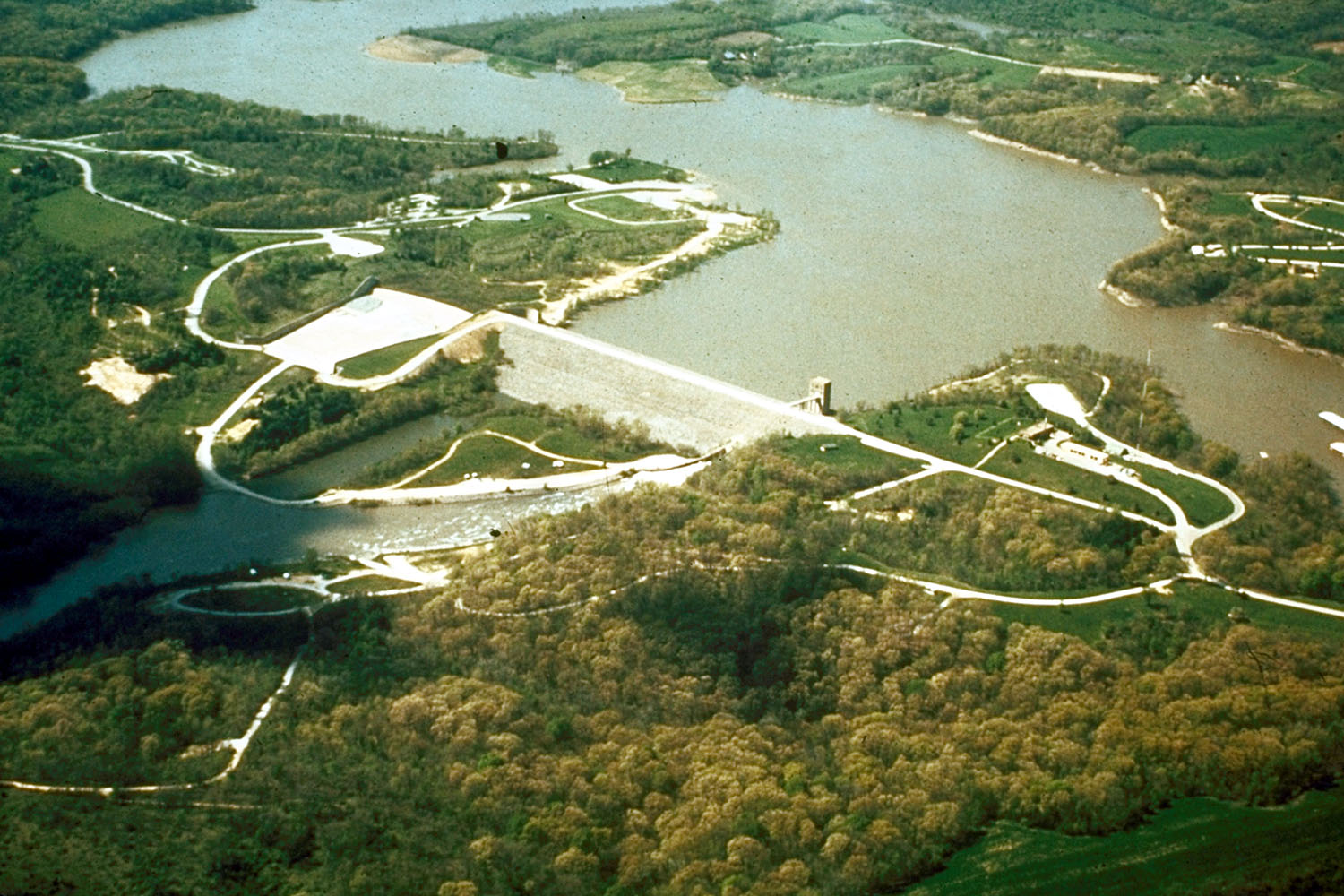
Coralville Reservoir

In 1958, the United States Army Corps of Engineers completed Coralville Dam along the Iowa River, four miles (6 km) north of the city, creating Coralville Lake. Except for the Great Flood of 1993 and the Great Iowa flood of 2008, the dam has helped prevent serious flooding in the city. From June through August 1993, all three of Coralville's main transportation links with Iowa City were submerged. The economic impact that year was severe, but the city had almost fully recovered within two years. The 2008 flood proved to be more costly as the Iowa River surpassed the 1993 record crest at over 31.5 feet (9.6 m).

The First Methodist Church was built in 1963 to the designs by architect Thomas Patrick Reilly of Crites & McConnell, 860 17th Street S.E. of Cedar Rapids.

On July 29, 1998, the Coral Ridge Mall opened with more than 100 stores, then the largest shopping center in the state. Around that time a "city center" area was created along the U.S. Route 6 "Coralville Strip" near its intersection with 12th Avenue. Coral Ridge Mall's opening would usher in a new era of retail development as big box stores opened in the area surrounding the mall. This has helped boost taxable sales in Coralville from $155.3 million in 1996 to $549.7 million in 2006.

Xtream Arena, a 5,100-seat venue, opened in 2020 in the city's Iowa River Landing neighborhood. Xtream Arena is home to the Iowa Heartlanders, an ECHL professional hockey team, affiliates of the Minnesota Wild and Iowa Wild, and the Coralville Chaos of American Indoor Football.

== Geography ==
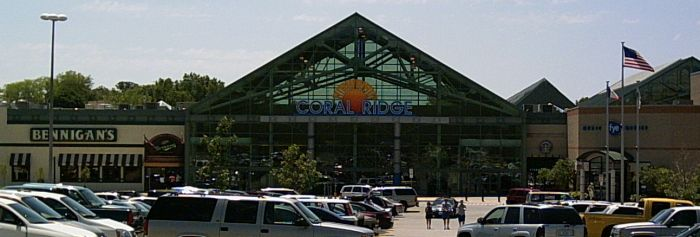
Coral Ridge Mall

According to the United States Census Bureau, the city has a total area of 12.05 square miles (31.21 km^{2}), of which 12.01 square miles (31.11 km^{2}) is land and 0.04 square miles (0.10 km^{2}) is water.

The Iowa River runs along the east edge of Coralville and forms part of the boundary with Iowa City. Interstate 80 runs east–west through Coralville, and most of the city's newer housing subdivisions are located north of I-80. U.S. Route 6 runs along Coralville's south edge, while Interstate 380, U.S. Route 218, and Iowa Highway 27 (the Avenue of the Saints) run along the city's west edge. The cloverleaf interchange of I-80 and I-380/U.S. 218/Iowa 27 is divided between the city limits of Coralville and neighboring Tiffin after recent annexations.

== Demographics ==
Historical populations
Year	Pop.	±%
1880	347	—
1890	173	−50.1%
1900	125	−27.7%
1910	151	+20.8%
1920	150	−0.7%
1930	254	+69.3%
1940	433	+70.5%
1950	977	+125.6%
1960	2,357	+141.2%
1970	6,130	+160.1%
1980	7,687	+25.4%
1990	10,347	+34.6%
2000	15,123	+46.2%
2010	18,907	+25.0%
2020	22,318	+18.0%
Source: U.S. Decennial Census

=== 2020 census ===
As of the 2020 census, Coralville had a population of 22,318. The median age was 33.2 years. 20.1% of residents were under the age of 18 and 12.5% of residents were 65 years of age or older. For every 100 females there were 105.6 males, and for every 100 females age 18 and over there were 105.8 males age 18 and over.

99.9% of residents lived in urban areas, while 0.1% lived in rural areas.

There were 9,643 households in Coralville, of which 24.5% had children under the age of 18 living in them. Of all households, 38.1% were married-couple households, 23.7% were households with a male householder and no spouse or partner present, and 29.5% were households with a female householder and no spouse or partner present. About 36.6% of all households were made up of individuals and 8.1% had someone living alone who was 65 years of age or older.

There were 10,408 housing units, of which 7.4% were vacant. The homeowner vacancy rate was 2.2% and the rental vacancy rate was 8.8%.

Racial composition as of the 2020 census
Race	Number	Percent
White	15,147	67.9%
Black or African American	3,133	14.0%
American Indian and Alaska Native	62	0.3%
Asian	1,948	8.7%
Native Hawaiian and Other Pacific Islander	3	0.0%
Some other race	535	2.4%
Two or more races	1,490	6.7%
Hispanic or Latino (of any race)	1,555	7.0%

=== 2018–2022 American Community Survey ===
From 2018 to 2022, the Census Bureau estimated a median household income of $67,691, a per capita income of $47,434, and that 10.7% of residents lived in poverty. During the same period, the average household size was 2.24 persons; 74.8% of residents lived in the same home as the year prior, 15.3% were born outside the United States, 3.2% were veterans, and 9.4% had a disability.

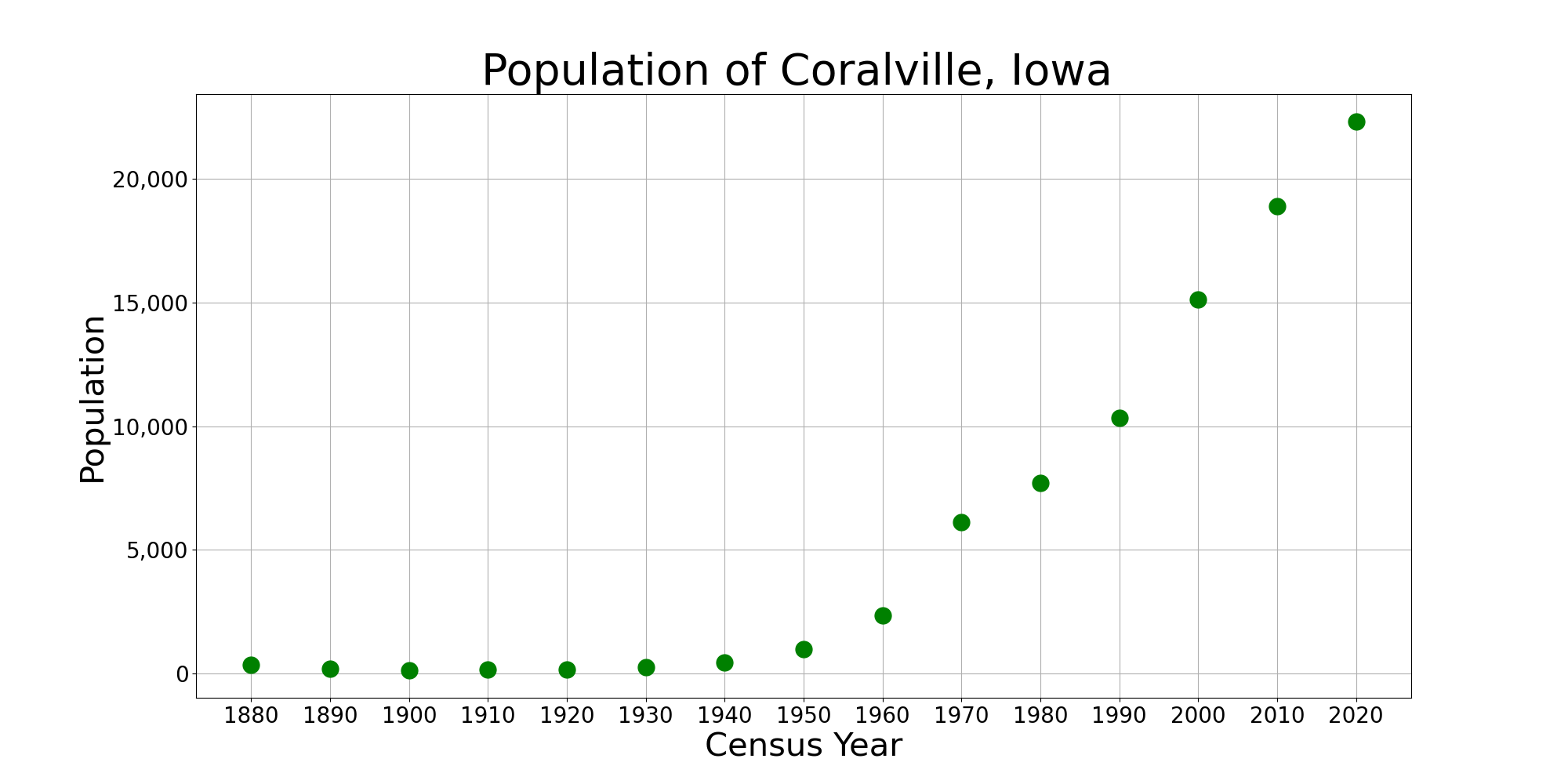
The population of Coralville, Iowa from US census data

=== 2010 census ===
As of the census of 2010, there were 18,907 people, 7,763 households, and 4,229 families residing in the city. The population density was 1,574.3 inhabitants per square mile (607.8/km^{2}). There were 8,310 housing units at an average density of 691.9 per square mile (267.1/km^{2}). The racial makeup of the city was 79.4% White, 7.9% African American, 0.3% Native American, 7.8% Asian, 0.1% Pacific Islander, 2.0% from other races, and 2.6% from two or more races. Hispanic or Latino of any race were 5.1% of the population.

There were 7,763 households, of which 29.4% had children under the age of 18 living with them, 42.8% were married couples living together, 8.5% had a female householder with no spouse present, 3.2% had a male householder with no spouse present, and 45.5% were non-families. 33.0% of all households were made up of individuals, and 5% had someone living alone who was 65 years of age or older. The average household size was 2.29 and the average family size was 3.01.

The median age in the city was 31.6 years. 22.3% of residents were under the age of 18; 11.6% were between the ages of 18 and 24; 36.5% were from 25 to 44; 22.2% were from 45 to 64; and 7.5% were 65 years of age or older. The gender makeup of the city was 51.5% male and 48.5% female.

=== 2000 census ===
As of the census of 2000, there were 15,123 people, 6,467 households, and 3,317 families residing in the city. The population density was 1,484.1 inhabitants per square mile (573.0/km^{2}). There were 6,754 housing units at an average density of 662.8 per square mile (255.9/km^{2}). The racial makeup of the city was 86.97% White, 4.23% African American, 0.34% Native American, 5.20% Asian, 0.06% Pacific Islander, 1.07% from other races, and 2.14% from two or more races. Hispanic or Latino of any race were 3.04% of the population.

There were 6,467 households, out of which 28.1% had children under the age of 18 living with them, 40.3% were married couples living together, 8.1% had a female householder with no spouse present, and 48.7% were non-families. 34.9% of all households were made up of individuals, and 4.3% had someone living alone who was 65 years of age or older. The average household size was 2.21 and the average family size was 2.96.

21.9% of the population are under the age of 18, 15.2% from 18 to 24, 40.9% from 25 to 44, 16.4% from 45 to 64, and 5.5% who were 65 years of age or older. The median age was 30 years. For every 100 females, there were 104.2 males. For every 100 females age 18 and over, there were 105.6 males.

The median income for a household in the city was $38,080, and the median income for a family was $57,869. Males had a median income of $35,288 versus $30,356 for females. The per capita income for the city was $23,283. About 6.1% of families and 10.1% of the population were below the poverty line, including 9.5% of those under age 18 and 3.2% of those age 65 or over.

== Media ==
Coralville has one licensed low-power FM station, KOUR-LP at 92.7 FM. KCJJ 1630 AM, which is licensed to Iowa City, began broadcasting from studios in Coralville's Iowa River Landing in 2007, but has since returned to its previous studios.

Coralville and Johnson County are part of the Cedar Rapids media market. Mediacom is the city's cable television provider.

== Transportation ==
Local bus service is provided by Coralville Transit, while commuter bus service to Iowa City and Cedar Rapids is provided by the 380 Express.

== Notable people ==
- Tina L. Cheng, Chair of Pediatrics of Cincinnati Children's Hospital Medical Center.
- Nate Kaeding, San Diego Chargers and former University of Iowa placekicker.
- Samuel J. Kirkwood, Governor of Iowa, Senator from Iowa, Secretary of the Interior.
- Jason McCartney, professional cyclist, Team RadioShack.
- Jeremy Morgan (born 1995), basketball player for Hapoel Jerusalem in the Israeli Basketball Premier League.
- Steven B. Jepson, opera and musical theater singer.
- Meghann Foster, first female mayor of Coralville.

== See also ==
- List of cities in Iowa
