= Chambersburg Cardinals =

American football team

General information
- Founded: 1946
- Headquartered: Chambersburg, Pennsylvania
- Website: www.chambersburgcardinals.com

League / conference affiliations
- Gridiron Developmental Football League (GDFL)

Championships
- League championships: 0; 1 (2011)

Current uniform

The Chambersburg Cardinals are an American football team based in Chambersburg, Pennsylvania. The team plays in the Gridiron Developmental Football League (GDFL).

== Founding ==
The team was founded in 1946 by local players returning from World War II. In 1956, the team disbanded due to difficulty scheduling quality teams. The Cardinals would not field another team until 1968.

The second incarnation of the Cardinals entered the Interstate Football League as an expansion team in 1968. They played in the IFL until 1971 when a portion of the IFL, including Chambersburg, merged with the Mason-Dixon Football League to become the Seaboard Football League—A league that held, among other teams, the Hartford Knights, Long Island Chiefs and New England Colonials, who were, or would move to, the Atlantic Coast Football League in 1973. They went on to win the league crown in 1973 (when some of the better teams left for the ACFL) before the team and league folded midseason in 1974. King Corcoran played for the Cardinals in 1972, after the Cardinals offered him a starting job. Corcoran had played for the Montreal Alouettes but refused to take a job as a backup. The team had four different quarterbacks start that year and it was Jim Haynie that started in the championship game. Corcoran left for the Philadelphia Bell of the World Football League in 1974.

== 1977–1984: Championship Era ==
Between 1977 and 1984, the Cardinals won 72 straight regular season games, including five perfect seasons, a record for non-collegiate football, although there is record of at least one loss in that time frame, to the Racine Gladiators in the 1981 Minor Professional Football Association championship.

== 2006: AIFL ==
In 2006, after a reorganization of the American Indoor Football League that saw the departure of the Syracuse Soldiers, the Cardinals were asked to fill two holes in the schedule. In their first game against the nearby Johnstown Riverhawks, the Cardinals lost by a score of 68–0, billed as the first shutout in AIFL history, although, since it was an AIFL team against a non-AIFL team, that would not be a fair comparison. Their second game against league powerhouse Reading Express had a similar result, a 74–0 loss. The AIFL declared that all records set against the Cardinals and the Ghostchasers, a team hastily established to fill the schedule of another team, the Carolina Ghostriders (which, in turn, had been hastily assembled to fill the schedule of yet another team the year before), would be marked with an asterisk.

== 2010–present: GDFL ==
In 2010, the Cardinals joined the Gridiron Developmental Football League and won the league title in 2011.
