= Midland Frac-Attack =

Professional indoor football team

Logo

General information
- Founded: 2026
- Headquartered: Midland, Texas
- Colors: Black, fire orange, gray
- GoMidlandFracAttack.com

Personnel
- Owners: Dominic Montero & Drake Roach
- General manager: Drake Roach
- Head coach: Terrence Foster

Team history
- Midland Frac-Attack (2026–present)

Home fields
- Midland Horseshoe Arena (2026–present)

League / conference affiliations
- American Indoor Football (2026–present)

The Midland Frac-Attack are a professional indoor football team based in Midland, Texas. They are current members of American Indoor Football. They were founded in 2026 as an expansion team and are set to begin playing their home games at the Midland Horseshoe Arena.

== History ==
=== American Indoor Football (2026–present) ===
On January 18, 2026, the league announced the Midland Frac-Attack as the league's seventh team and newest expansion team. They join the Odessa Drillers and the newest teams to play in the state of Texas and will play a series of games known as the "Battle For The Basin Series" rivalry referencing the Permian Basin.

Longtime arena/indoor football player/coach Terrence Foster was named the first head coach after he assumed duties as the new commissioner of the AIF.

As of April 2026, Fort Stockton High School (Fort Stockton, Texas) broadcast class/internet channel Tumbleweed+ began carrying Frac-Attack home games on their Facebook and YouTube channels. The staff includes adult commentators and a staff consisting completely of high school students, a first for professional sports.
