= Tina L. Cheng =

American pediatrician

- Born: Coralville, Iowa, US
- Spouse: Ken Conca

Academic background
- Education: BSc, MD, Brown University; MPH, University of California, Berkeley

Academic work
- Institutions: Cincinnati Children's Hospital Medical Center; Johns Hopkins University

Tina Lee Cheng is an American pediatrician. In 2020, she was named the Chair of Pediatrics, Chief Medical Officer, and Research Foundation Director of Cincinnati Children's Hospital Medical Center and was previously Director of Pediatrics and Pediatrician-In-Chief at Johns Hopkins University.

== Early life and education ==
Cheng was born in Coralville, Iowa to Chinese immigrant parents Frank and Margareth Cheng. Her mother was a kindergarten teacher and her father was a biochemist. Growing up alongside two sisters, she considered her mother a role model and described her as a "strong woman." As a youth, she experienced a lot of nosebleeds and visited ENT doctors frequently, resulting in her wishing to pursue a medical career.

Cheng attended Iowa City West High School, where she was one of three Asian students enrolled. As a senior in 1979, she was selected by President Jimmy Carter as one of five American high school students to participate in the International Science School. She was also the recipient of the Hugh F. Seabury Debate and Forensics award on the basis of scholarship, integrity, character and general debate performance through her high school career.

Upon graduating from high school, Cheng enrolled at Brown University for her undergraduate degree and medical degree before completing a residency in pediatrics at University of California, San Francisco and preventive medicine at University of California, Berkeley. Prior to attending Brown, Cheng shied away from pediatrics in defiance of adults who told her it was "a good field for a woman." However, after completing her pediatrics clinical rotation, she chose to pursue it as her specialty.

== Career ==
Upon completing her graduate degree in public health at the University of California, Berkeley, followed by a research fellowship at the University of Massachusetts, Cheng worked at the Children's National Hospital in Washington, D.C. and founded the Generations Clinic. She remained there for eight years before being recruited to become the director of Johns Hopkins University's Children's Center Division of General Pediatrics and Adolescent Medicine. In this role, she led a team addressing social determinants of health, and for 15 years co-led the NIH funded DC Baltimore Research Center on Child Health Disparities. In 2013, Cheng and colleagues established Centro SOL (Salud and Opportunity for Latinos) to partner with the community in addressing the needs of a growing immigrant community. In 2014, Cheng and colleague Sara Johnson founded the Ruth and Norman Rales Center for the Integration of Health and Education which serves over 1,500 students at two Baltimore charter schools.

As a result of her work in pediatrics, in 2015 Cheng received the American Academy of Pediatrics Education Award, and was honored as a Trailblazing Women in Business at the 2016 annual Women in Business Trailblazers in Healthcare Awards Dinner. The following year, she was appointed to the Given Foundation Professorship and director of the Department of Pediatrics and was elected to the National Academy of Medicine. In 2018, Cheng was recognized by the Daily Record as one of the Most Influential Marylanders for her dedication and commitment to children's health.

In 2020, Cheng was named the B.K. Rachford Memorial Chair in Pediatrics, Chief Medical Officer, and Research Foundation Director of Cincinnati Children's Hospital Medical Center. The following year, Johns Hopkins recognized her work with a Portrait Honor.

== Personal life ==
Cheng and her husband Ken Conca have two children together, a son and a daughter. In 2020, Cheng and her daughter Alison Conca-Cheng wrote a commentary in response to a study on racism affecting Chinese American parents and children.
