= Pennsylvania Union =

Professional indoor football team

Logo

General information
- Founded: 2020
- Headquartered: Harrisburg, Pennsylvania
- Colors: Red, white, blue, gray
- PennUnionFootball.com (Under construction)

Personnel
- Owner: Brian Dykes
- Head coach: Jerome Junior
- President: Brian Dykes

Team history
- Pennsylvania Union (2019–present)

Home fields
- Travelling team (2026-present)

League / conference affiliations
- American Arena League (2021); Independent (2022); American Indoor Football (2026–present)

The Pennsylvania Union are a professional indoor football team based in Harrisburg, Pennsylvania. They are current members of American Indoor Football. They were founded in 2020.

== History ==
=== First stint (2020–2022) ===
The Union were founded in 2020 by longtime football coach and Desert Storm veteran Brian Dykes. The team was scheduled to play in 2020, but their season was postponed due to the COVID-19 pandemic. They went on hiatus until 2021 when they played a COVID-formatted schedule in the only season in the American Arena League. They were to have competed in the newly-formed American Indoor Football Alliance in 2021, but were left off that league's schedule for 2022 leading them to play as an independent that year.

=== American Indoor Football (2026 onward) ===
On April 1, 2025, after a four-year hiatus, the Union announced on all of their social media platforms that they would become members of American Indoor Football starting in the 2026 season. The league later confirmed the announcement at their website despite the team not having a website of their own. They have tentatively agreed to play their home games at the Pennsylvania Farm Show Complex & Expo Center in Harrisburg, previous home of the now-defunct Harrisburg Stampede, starting in 2027 while they begin play as a travel team for 2026. The announcement was made months after the Stampede announced their folding following moving to the NAL. The Union also announced an internet broadcasting deal with Brooklyn, New York-based internet television station NY 48 WWON-TV and will have the games televised via the team's YouTube channel. However, that deal fell though due to the Union's inability to secure their arena in time.

The AIF schedule was released October 16, 2025, with the Union having only one game included (against the West Michigan Ironmen in week 1). However, they have since assumed all of the road contests for 2026 vacated by the termination of membership of the North Michigan Muskies.

West Michigan Ironmen owner Mario Flores assumed ownership of AIF in 2026 and indicated that he was unwilling to schedule home games for the Union for 2027; he would instead make the Union and other teams play its home games as undercards to Ironmen games to avoid the expenses of traveling to Harrisburg.
