= Great Lakes Arena Football =

American indoor football league based in Michigan

- Sport: Indoor football
- Founded: 2023; 3 years ago
- Founder: West Michigan Ironmen
- First season: 2023
- Folded: 2025
- CEO: Mario Flores
- No. of teams: 4 (as of August 30, 2024)
- Country: United States
- Headquarters: Muskegon, Michigan
- Last champion: Michigan Avengers (2024)
- Website: greatlakesarenafootball.com

The Great Lakes Arena Football (GLAF) is a professional American indoor football minor league based in the Great Lakes region in the United States whose operations are currently dormant.

The GLAF was designed to be a regional "bus league" with minimal travel, while league member West Michigan Ironmen have direct control over league operations and membership. The Ironmen joined American Indoor Football on December 25, 2024.

In June 2026, GLAF merged with American Indoor Football.

== History ==
After the 2021 American Arena League season concluded, Charlotte Thunder, West Michigan Ironmen and Pennsylvania Union left to form their own league (Arena Professional Football League), with the intent to run a five-team eight-week APFL schedule will run from April 16 through June 4, 2022. But by the time the season started only two Charlotte and Michigan were operating, and the Ironmen ended up playing an independent schedule. That experience, in addition to traveling costs, led them to form a league of their own called "Great Lakes Arena Alliance".

=== 2023 season ===
For its first season the GLAA planned that five teams would participate in the league's inaugural 2023 season starting on March 4: Chicago Power, Southern Michigan Apex, Battle Creek Smoke, West Michigan Ironmen and Ohio Blitz, but Chicago were removed just before the season started. All remaining teams advanced to the playoffs, with the Ironmen winning the inaugural league championship, after beating the Southern Michigan Apex 81–25.

=== 2024 season ===
For the 2024 season the league changed its name to Great Lakes Arena Football and featured a seven team lineup: the Battle Creek (MI) Smoke, Detroit Knights (originally the Detroit Dark Knights), Michigan Avengerz (Farmington, MI), Ohio Boom (Dayton), Toledo Extreme Shamrocks, West Michigan Ironmen (Muskegon) and Tri-State Bucks (Pioneer, OH). The Avengerz won the second league championship, after beating the Ironmen 30-12 in the final. The Ironmen would later suspend league operations after joining American Indoor Football in 2025.

=== Revival as the Great Lakes Division ===
In June 2026, the Ironmen announced their takeover of American Indoor Football, following its expulsion of Dominic Montero (co-founder of AIF's previous incarnation) earlier in the season. As part of the takeover, Great Lakes Arena Football would be effectively revived as an autonomous division of AIF, consisting of the Ironmen and Cedar Rapids Titans along with two traveling teams.

The 2026 incarnation of GLAF will follow a model of doubleheaders, in which, in the event they play each other, the games will be held at the home arena where Cedar Rapids or West Michigan is playing their home game that week as an undercard contest leading into the main event of the Ironmen or Titans game.

== Teams slated for the 2027 revival ==
Team	Home city	Home venue	Head coach
West Michigan Ironmen	Muskegon, Michigan	Trinity Health Arena	Nate Smith
Cedar Rapids Titans	Cedar Rapids, Iowa	Alliant Energy PowerHouse	Vacant
Pennsylvania Union	none	none	Jerome Junior
Central New York Blue Devils	none	none	

=== Former teams ===
- Chicago Power (Chicago, Illinois) — Was part of the original teams for the 2023 season, but were removed just before the season started.
- Southern Michigan Apex (Kalamazoo, Michigan) - Played the 2023 season, but were removed from league prior to the 2024 season.
- Ohio Blitz (Lima, Ohio) - Played the 2023 season, but were removed from league prior to the 2024 season.
- Wisconsin Aviators (Milwaukee, Wisconsin) - Originally announced as a GLAF member for the 2024 season, but then was not included in the final alignment.
- Tri-State Bucks (Pioneer, Ohio) — Moved to the Midwest Arena Football League following the 2024 season.
- Michigan Avengerz (Farmington, Michigan) — Moved to the United Indoor Football Association following the 2024 season. Now a member in the AAL2
- Ohio Boom (Dayton, Ohio) — Moved to the United Indoor Football Association following the 2024 season.
- Battle Creek Smoke (Battle Creek, Michigan)
- Detroit Knights (Detroit, Michigan)
- Toledo Extreme Shamrocks (Toledo, Ohio)

== Champions ==
Game	Winner	Runner up	Score
2023	West Michigan Ironmen	Southern Michigan Apex	81–25
2024	Michigan Avengers	West Michigan Ironmen	30-12
