= Xtream Arena =

Multipurpose arena in Coralville, Iowa

Coordinates: 41°40′52.9″N 91°33′45.0″W

- Location within Iowa Location within the United States
- Location: Coralville, Iowa
- Owner: City of Coralville
- Operator: Oak View Group
- Capacity: 5,100 (4,878 hockey)

Construction
- Groundbreaking: 2018
- Opened: 2020
- Cost: $50 million
- Architect: JLG Architects
- General contractor: Mortenson Construction

Tenants
- Iowa Hawkeyes volleyball (2020–present); Iowa Heartlanders (ECHL) (2021–2026); Coralville Chaos (AIF) (2025)

Website
- Official site

Xtream Arena powered by Mediacom is a multipurpose arena in Coralville, Iowa, that opened in September 2020. The main tenants of the arena are the Iowa Hawkeyes volleyball team. It previously served as the home for the professional ice hockey team Iowa Heartlanders of the ECHL until the team suspended operations in March 2026.

== History ==
In 2019, Mediacom was announced as the naming rights partner via its Xtream brand.

The city lost its investment-grade bond rating as a result of the project.

== Tenants ==
The arena serves as the home court of the nearby University of Iowa's volleyball team.

Developers had expressed interest in luring a USHL or ECHL franchise. On September 17, 2020, the city announced it had come to an agreement to host an ECHL team that was approved to begin play for in the 2021–22 season named the Iowa Heartlanders. They played their first game in the arena on October 22, 2021 against the Kansas City Mavericks.

The arena played host to the Coralville Chaos of American Indoor Football for the 2025 season before relocating to Traverse City, Michigan, and rebranding as the North Michigan Muskies.

On March 6–7, 2026, the arena hosted the first official NCAA women's wrestling championship meet.
