= Cedar Rapids Titans =

American indoor football team

Logo

General information
- Founded: 2011
- Headquartered: Cedar Rapids, Iowa
- Colors: Black, Carolina blue, gray
- CRTitans.com

Personnel
- Owner: Mike Thorson
- General manager: Vacant
- Head coach: Vacant
- President: Mike Thorson

Team history
- Cedar Rapids River Kings (2019–2020, 2024–2025); Cedar Rapids Titans (2012–2018, 2026–present)

Home fields
- Cedar Rapids Ice Arena (2012–2013); Alliant Energy PowerHouse (2014–2020, 2024–present)

League / conference affiliations
- Indoor Football League (2012–2020); United Conference (2012–2017); American Indoor Football (2024–present); Great Lakes Conference (beginning 2027)

Playoff appearances (4)
- IFL: 2013, 2014, 2015, 2016

The Cedar Rapids Titans are a professional indoor football team based in Cedar Rapids, Iowa. They are current members of American Indoor Football. The Titans first joined the Indoor Football League (IFL) as an expansion team in 2011 and first took the field for the 2012 season. They played as the Cedar Rapids River Kings from 2019 to 2020 and again from 2024 until 2025. Since 2014, the Titans/River Kings franchise has played its home games at the newly renovated Alliant Energy PowerHouse, after having played their first two seasons at the Cedar Rapids Ice Arena. The franchise is the first indoor team to be based in Cedar Rapids and have appeared in two IFL United Conference championship games (2013, 2014), losing to the Sioux Falls Storm both times.

During the 2018 season, the Titans were sold to new ownership and announced that they would rebrand for 2019 with a name-the-team contest, eventually taking on the River Kings name.

Due to the effects of the COVID-19 pandemic, the River Kings went dormant for at least the 2021 season. The team website was deactivated in 2020 and the team was not included as a 2022 league member.

The River Kings would return in 2024, as members of the revived AIF. On June 2, 2025, the team reverted back to the Titans.

== Franchise history ==
Original Titans logo from the IFL (2012-2018)

=== 2012 – Titans ===
In August 2011, it was announced that the Cedar Rapids Titans would become an expansion team of the Indoor Football League for the 2012 season owned by Chris Kokalis, Bob Sullivan and Kenneth Moninski. Titans' general manager, Chris Kolalis stated, "We believe that Cedar Rapids is a fantastic market to bring a team into. We hope to promote economic development and be a part of the growth of the community by being active and giving back to the fans." The team also announced that they would play their home games at the Cedar Rapids Ice Arena, with the intentions to play in the newly renovated, U.S. Cellular Center in 2013. On November 18, 2011, the Titans hired former NFL player, Kyle Moore-Brown, as the first coach in franchise history. They won their inaugural game on March 3, 2012, with a 32–13 win over Lehigh Valley Steelhawks.

=== 2013 ===
The Titans lost their pre-season warm-up against Green Bay but began the 2013 regular season with three straight wins in a home-and-home series with Chicago and hosting the new Texas Revolution franchise out of Allen. After a two-week bye, the team lost its next three games. The Titans recovered from this stumble and finished the season second in the United Conference with a 9–5 record. They made the post-season but lost to the Sioux Falls Storm in the United Conference Championship. The team fared much better at home than on the road with 5 of its 6 losses coming when it was away from the Cedar Rapids Ice Arena.

=== 2014 ===
The Titans were one of eight returning teams plus one expansion team for the 2014 Indoor Football League season. After a 38–47 loss to open the 2014 season, the Titans went on to win their next 8 games in a row. The Titans entered Week 12, with a chance to claim first place in the United Conference, but fell 36–48 to the undefeated Storm. The Titans avenged the loss during the final game of the season, defeating the Storm 49–37. The victory placed the Titans in second place in the United Conference, and ended the Storm's undefeated season. The Titans' 2nd-place finish meant a road playoff game against the Storm in the United Conference Finals, where they were defeated 36–73.

=== 2015 ===
The Titans were tasked with replacing 2014 starting quarterback Spencer Ohm, while also losing the IFL's leading rusher, LaRon Council. The team signed Sam Durley, from the defunct Wyoming Cavalry, to be their new starting quarterback. Durley got the Titans off to a 6–3 start, good enough for second place in the United Conference, but he was released on May 4, 2015, to sign with the New Orleans VooDoo. However, just two weeks prior to Durley's release, the Titans had traded for the 2014 IFL MVP, Willie Copeland. Jeremiah Price was named the Defensive Player of the Year.

=== 2016 ===
The Titans were yet again looking for a quarterback heading into 2016. The team selected Dylan Favre (quarterback for the national team from the 2015 Football World Cup and the nephew of Brett Favre) to lead the team. Favre finished 6th in the league in passing touchdowns and 5 in passing yards as the Titans finished the season 12–4, clinching the 2 seed in the United Conference. The Titans won their first playoff game in team history with a 66–36 victory over the Wichita Falls Nighthawks, but were once again defeated by the Sioux Falls Storm 48–41 in the United Conference Championship. Price repeated as the Defensive Player of the Year.

=== 2017 ===
The Titans hired former Iowa Hawkeyes wide receiver, Marvin McNutt as the third coach in team history.

=== 2018 ===
After the 2017 season, head coach McNutt took over as general manager and hired Billy Back, the 2016 IFL coach of the year with the Wichita Falls Nighthawks, as the new head coach. However, coach Back would leave the team a couple of months after his hiring to coach the expansion Carolina Cobras of the National Arena League for the 2018 season. The Titans then hired former NFL linebacker Marvin Jones as his replacement.

On January 30, 2018, the Titans' ownership announced the team was for sale with hopes of selling to new local ownership. In June, it was announced that the Titans had been sold to Roy Choi, a California-based businessman, with the intentions of keeping the team Cedar Rapids.

=== River Kings ===
Original River Kings IFL logo (2018–2023)

In a letter to fans posted on the team's website on August 17, 2018, new general manager Ryan Eucker announced that the Titans' name and identity would be replaced as part of a rebranding process after the ownership change. On August 20, 2018, Eucker announced a name-the-team contest to select a new team name and identity with submissions due by September 5. On September 22, the team announced their new name as the Cedar Rapids River Kings with a new logo and color scheme to be unveiled by mid-October. On September 25, 2018, general manager Ryan Eucker announced that Mark Stoute had returned as the head coach of the River Kings. He coached the Titans from 2013 to 2016. A few games into the season, general manager Eucker was sent by the new owner to his other IFL team, the San Diego Strike Force, to take over as general manager. Reggie Harris was promoted to the River Kings' general manager.

The River Kings finished with a 1–13 record and head coach Stoute was fired after the season. Victor Mann was brought in as head coach after his previous team, the Texas Revolution, had folded the previous season.

The River Kings participated in one of the two league games that were completed in the 2020 season before the entire league's season was curtailed during the COVID-19 pandemic. The team also withdrew from the league's 2021 season.

=== 2024 ===
River Kings AIF logo (2024-2025)

In 2024, the River Kings were revived as a member of American Indoor Football.

A dispute between AIF and owner Dominic Montero led to the River Kings playing the second half of their 2024 season as an independent. Among the games the River Kings played as an independent were two games as a substitute to fill schedule holes during the 2024 Arena Football League season.

=== 2025 ===
Once all of the other teams in AIF departed for the National Arena League, AIF founder John Morris resigned his post, and former Champions Indoor Football and Arena Football League (2024) executive Mike McCoy became the league's new commissioner, the River Kings returned to AIF. The River Kings scheduled a limited slate of games between the Coralville Chaos (also owned by Montero) and the West Michigan Ironmen, who join AIF after having operated its own league (Great Lakes Arena Football) the previous two seasons, among a handful of games against other midwestern indoor football teams. On March 28, 2025, offensive coordinator Dylan Litherland was named interim head coach after head coach Michael Coleman became general manager and head coach of the newly-formed Wyoming Cavalry. Litherland has since left the team.

Then on May 11, 2025, the league officially announced that former Amarillo Venom head coach Rick "Prez" Kranz was named the new head coach and general manager of the River Kings.

=== Return of the Titans ===
On June 2, 2025, the franchise had retired the River Kings name (intellectual property still owned by Montero) and has officially reverted back to their original name, the Cedar Rapids Titans, unveiling its new logos on their Facebook page and revamped its website. The Titans will remain members of the AIF and return to the field in 2026. As of June 30, 2025, it was announced that Titans GM/head coach Rick Kranz is new co-owner with Mike Thorson retaining his share of the ownership. On October 3, 2025, the team's Facebook announced that Thorson is now 100% owner with Kranz retaining his GM/HC roles.

==== Brawl with the Wyoming Cavalry ====
On March 20, 2026, the team hosted the Wyoming Cavalry, a team owned by former Titans owner Dominic Montero, who serving a one-game suspension following an on-field altercation (as a player) during the Cavalry's then-non-league game against the Central New York Blue Devils on Valentine's Day. With Montero serving that suspension, the two teams faced off in a heated contest that ended up in a fight in the Cavalry bench area when a Cedar Rapids assistant coach appeared to have blindsided Cavalry co-owner/team president Drake Roach and dragged him into the hallway and locker room area. That led to several Cedar Rapids players leaping over the bench to apparently break up the altercation and the game being called by the officials with 10:51 left in the third quarter with the Cavalry winning 14-12 by league rules (later changed to a league-imposed forfeit win for the Titans). The Titans' assistant coach was suspended for the remainder of the season with a chance to be reinstated for 2027, seven Titans players were suspended two games and one Titans player for one game for jumping over the wall, which is a violation of league rules. One Cavalry player was suspended for one game, Roach was fined for game operations violations and the entire franchise was fined for gameday operation violations. The Titans did appeal the suspensions. However, the Cavalry franchise were since suspended by the league and have since left the league. The Titans remain in the league as they have since apologized to the fans, supporters and sponsors and have moved on from the incident.

==== Downfall and new beginnings (2026-present) ====
On May 4, 2026, the league declared the West Michigan Ironmen league champions for the second consecutive year after the championship game scheduled for May 9, 2026, was cancelled due to an "unavoidable venue conflict" with the Muskegon Lumberjacks hockey team. The league explored multiple alternatives to reschedule the game. But according to the league office, "doing so has been deemed unfeasible due to logistical constraints, including player housing and availability challenges impacting the Cedar Rapids Titans". The team finished 3-3 on the season and won the trip to the championship game before it was ultimately cancelled. On May 6, 2026, the team announced on their Facebook page that Rick Kranz is "no longer with the Titans", later determined that he was fired by ownership. On May 18, 2026, the Titans began its restructuring by welcoming local business owner Ray Miller as Director of Player Personnel/Recruiting and Team Oversight.

== Statistics and records ==
=== Season-by-season results ===
League champions	Conference champions	Playoff berth	League leader

Season	Team	League	Conference	Regular season			Postseason results
Season	Team	League	Conference	Finish	Wins	Losses	Postseason results
2012	2012	IFL	United	7th	4	10	
2013	2013	IFL	United	2nd	9	5	Lost United Conference Championship (Sioux Falls) 20–44
2014	2014	IFL	United	2nd	11	3	Lost United Conference Championship (Sioux Falls) 36–73
2015	2015	IFL	United	2nd	9	5	Lost United Conference Championship (Sioux Falls) 12–34
2016	2016	IFL	United	2nd	12	4	Won United Conference Wild Card (Wichita Falls) 66–36; Lost United Conference Championship (Sioux Falls) 24–58
2017	2017	IFL	United	5th	1	15	
2018	2018	IFL		5th	3	11	
2019	2019	IFL		9th	1	13	
2020	2020	IFL			0	1	Season cancelled due to the COVID-19 pandemic
2021	Dormant year						
2022	Dormant year						
2023	Dormant year						
2024	2024	AIF		5th	0	2	
2025	2025	AIF		3rd	1	5	
2026	2026	AIF		2nd	3	3	Made it to the championship, but did not play
Totals					53	72	All-time regular season record
Totals					1	4	All-time postseason record
Totals					54	77	All-time regular season and postseason record

== Head coaches ==
Note: Statistics are correct through the 2024 American Indoor Football season.

Name	Tenure	Regular season			Playoffs		Awards
Name	Tenure	W	L	Win%	W	L	Awards
Kyle Moore-Brown	2012	4	10	.286	0	0	
Mark Stoute	2013–2016, 2019	42	30	.583	1	4	2013 IFL Coach of the Year
Marvin McNutt	2017	1	15	.063	0	0	
Marvin Jones	2018	3	11	.214	0	0	
Victor Mann	2020	0	1	.000	0	0	
Daron Clark	2024	2	3	.400	0	0	
Michael Coleman	2025	0	1	.000	0	0	
Dylan Litherland	2025	1	2	.333	0	0	
Rick Kranz	2026	3	3	.500	0	0	

== Notable players ==
=== All-IFL players ===
The following Titans/River Kings players have been named to All-IFL Teams:

- RB LaRon Council (2)
- WR Carl Sims, Bryan Pray (2), Damond Powell
- OL Maurice Robinson, Albert Erni Jr., A. J. Harmon
- DL Xzavie Jackson (4), Kyle Jenkins, Jeremiah Price (2)
- LB Nikolas Sierra
- DB T. J. Simmons, Ricky Johnson
- K Rockne Belmonte (2), Nicholas Belcher
- KR Robert Brown, Demetruce McNeal

=== Individual awards ===
The following is a list of all Titans/River Kings players who have won league awards

Special Teams Player of the Year
Season	Player	Position
2014	Rockne Belmonte	K

Defensive Player of the Year
Season	Player	Position
2015	Jeremiah Price	DL
2016	Jeremiah Price	DL
