= Steven B. Jepson =

American baritone opera singer

Dr. Steven B. Jepson
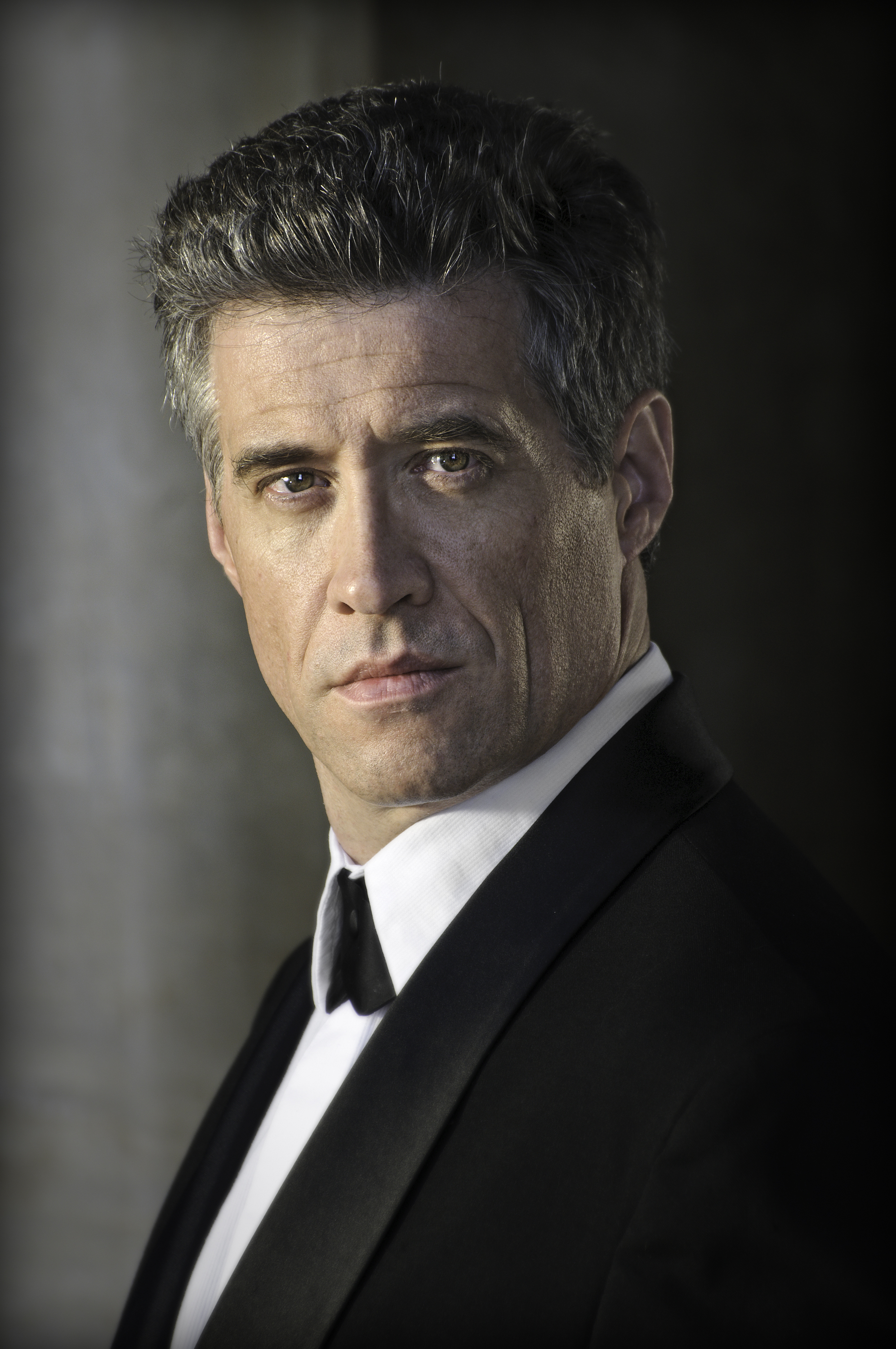

Background information
- Also known as: Steven Jepson; Steve Jepson
- Born: Steven Baker Jepson; May 28, 1960 (age 66); Iowa City, Iowa, United States
- Genres: Opera, Musical theater, Symphonic, Choral, Pops
- Occupations: Singer, actor, instructor, clinician
- Years active: 1986–present
- Website: www.facebook.com/StevenBJepson youtube.com/@CubbyHawk

Steven B. Jepson (born May 28, 1960) is an American singer (a baritone) and actor. In addition to his work in opera, musical theater, and concert work, he has appeared in films and is a vocal instructor and clinician.

== Education ==
Steven Jepson attended public school in Coralville and Iowa City, graduating from Iowa City West High School in 1978. He received a bachelor's degree in Music from the University of Iowa in 1982, where he performed in the UI Opera Theater and the Hawkeye Marching Band. He received a masters degree in Opera Performance and Choral Conducting from Louisiana State University in 1982, and completed three years towards a doctorate degree at the University of Missouri/Kansas City before pursuing his professional career. He returned to Iowa in 2011 and completed the doctorate (opera, opera directing, vocal pedagogy) in 2015. His dissertation focused on the work of little-known French composer Marcel Delannoy.

During his career, he served on the faculty of many midwestern colleges, including Graceland University, College of DuPage, and Benedictine University, teaching voice, theater, diction, music appreciation, and art song literature. He was a voice instructor at Gaston School of the Arts in Gastonia, North Carolina, where he also produced and directed three productions as Playhouse director. After receiving his doctorate, he worked for eight years as Assistant/Associate Teaching Professor at the University of Missouri and a year at the University of Wisconsin–Platteville. He is a certified in vocology from the National Center for Voice and Speech.

== Opera ==
Jepson's operatic repertoire includes leading roles in Don Pasquale, Il Barbiere di Siviglia, The Merry Widow, Ariadne auf Naxos, Roméo et Juliette, La bohème, Die Zauberflöte and Faust. He is best known for his interpretation of Escamillo in Carmen, a role he has played with several companies in the United States and Europe.

== Musical theatre/Concert/Cruise work ==
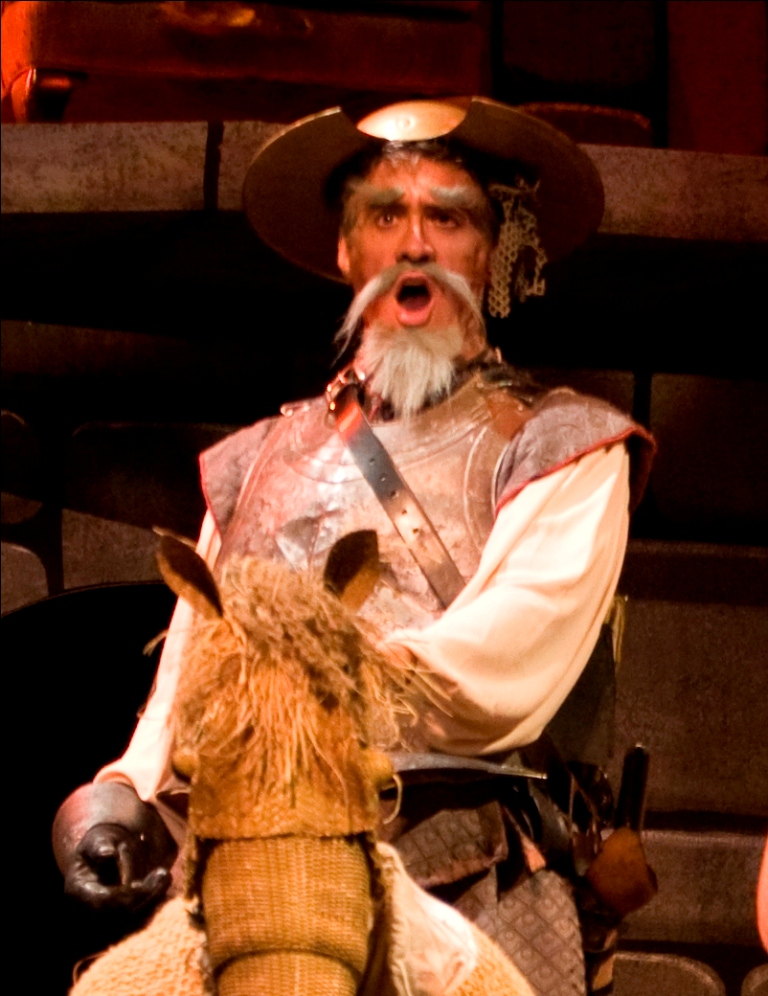

Starting with chorus roles in local Iowa City community productions of The Music Man, Oklahoma!, and Pippin, his refined acting ability coupled with a versatile baritone voice has produced diverse portrayals in musical theater. He has played roles such as Billy Bigelow in Carousel, Juan Peron in Evita, Ko-Ko in The Mikado, The Lord Chancellor in Iolanthe, The Pirate King in The Pirates of Penzance, Sweeney in Sweeney Todd, and Cervantes/Don Quixote in Man of LaMancha. He was nominated for Best Actor in a Musical by the Metrolina Theatre Association and Creative Loafing Magazine for his portrayal of Emile de Becque in CPCC's South Pacific.

He made his Carnegie Hall debut in Franz Schubert's Mass in G and also sang at Carnegie in Benjamin Britten's War Requiem under the baton of Robert Shaw. In addition to performing before an audience of 8,000 at a "Carnivale" concert in Mazatlán, Mexico, he has worked as a principal male singer with Jean Ann Ryan Productions aboard Norwegian Cruise Line's Norwegian Sky.

== Film work ==
Along with industrial films, Steven Jepson has worked as an extra in major Hollywood films such as Mr. and Mrs. Bridge and Stranger than Fiction, as well as playing the Lieutenant in the independent film Inside the Locket. He is best known as an actor for Admiral Conrad Slater in the award-winning Star Trek independent fan film Prelude to Axanar. He has reprised this role in the fan films Interlude and Dive.
