= Richmond Bandits =

American indoor football team

Logo

General information
- Founded: 2005
- Folded: 2006
- Headquartered: Richmond, Virginia at the Richmond Coliseum
- Colors: Blue, Red, White
- Mascot: Billy the Bandit

Personnel
- Head coach: Brent Williams

Team history
- Richmond Bandits (2005-2006)

Home fields
- Richmond Coliseum (2005-2006)

League / conference affiliations
- Atlantic/American Indoor Football League (2005–2006): Southern (2006)

Championships
- League championships: 1 AIFL (2005)

Playoff appearances (2)
- AIFL: 2005, 2006

The Richmond Bandits were a professional indoor football team based in Richmond, Virginia. They were a charter member of the Atlantic Indoor Football League. In 2005, the Bandits defeated the Erie Freeze to win the AIFL's first-ever American Bowl, completing the year with a combined record of 11-1. On February 7, 2005, ownership announced that the team would be nicknamed the "Bandits", and that the would be coached by Rik Richards. During that inaugural year, head coach Rik Richards, offensive coordinator Brent Williams, and line coach Steve Criswell led one of the league's most potent offenses and a defense that led the league in takeaways. Starting quarterback Will Burch led the team to a 4-1 record, including a 94-point outburst at Johnstown, before being replaced by Robbie Jenkins due to ineffectiveness in game 6. Damon "Redd" Thompson, Bryan Still, DeAndre Green, and Marcel Willis were the team's top receivers. Lawrence Lewis and Julian Graham anchored the defense. The Bandits played their home games in the Richmond Coliseum. Also affiliated with the team are the Bandivas, the dance team for the Bandits, and mascot Billy the Bandit.

Despite ending up 12-2 (second in the Southern Conference) in their second year, they were unable to agree on issues concerning the league and their rules, and were suspended by the AIFL from the playoffs. Their team owner stated that the Bandits will no longer be part of the American Indoor Football League.

Because they were unable to join any other indoor league and there was potential to bring back the Richmond Speed, it is most likely that the Bandits have disbanded.

In their last year in the AIFL, WR Redd Thompson was named the 2006 Southern Conference Offensive MVP.

== Statistics and records ==
=== Season-by-season results ===
League champions	Conference champions	Division champions	Playoff berth	League leader

Season	League	Conference	Division	Regular season				Postseason results
Season	League	Conference	Division	Finish	Wins	Losses	Ties	Postseason results
2005	AIFL			2nd	9	1	0	Won AIFL Semifinal (Johnstown) 50–40; Won American Bowl I (Erie) 56–30
2006	AIFL	Southern		2nd	12	2	0	Forfeit Southern Conference Semifinal (Raleigh)
Totals					21	3	0	All-time regular season record (2005–2006)
Totals					2	1	—	All-time postseason record (2005–2006)
Totals					23	4	0	All-time regular season and postseason record (2005–2006)
