= American Indoor Football =

Professional indoor football league

- Most recent season or competition: 2026 American Indoor Football season
- American Indoor Football logo
- Formerly: Atlantic Indoor Football League (2005); American Indoor Football League (2006); American Indoor Football Association (2007–10)
- Sport: Indoor football
- Founded: 2005
- Founder: Andrew Haines (original AIFL); John Morris and Michael Mink (AIFA/AIF); Dominic Montero (2025 version)
- First season: 2005
- Folded: 2024 (Morris/Mink version)
- Owners: Mario Flores (majority); Larry Clark (minority)
- Commissioner: Terrence Foster
- No. of teams: 12
- Country: United States
- Headquarters: Baltimore, Maryland
- Last champion: West Michigan Ironmen (2nd AIF title)
- Most titles: Baltimore Mariners, Columbus Lions, West Michigan Ironmen (2 titles)
- Sponsors: VanDyk Mortgage (title sponsor); Basin Radio Network
- Related competitions: AF1, IFL, NAL, TAL, AAL
- Website: https://aif-indoorfootball.com

American Indoor Football (AIF) is a professional indoor football league, one of the several regional professional indoor football leagues in North America.

The AIFL began as a regional league with six franchises on the East Coast of the United States in 2005. After a rapid, and largely failed, expansion effort in 2006, most of the league's remaining teams jumped to the new American Indoor Football Association (AIFA) (the rest joined the short-lived WIFL). The AIFA expanded throughout existing territory and, in 2008, expanded into the Western United States. The league legally divided into two entities to allow for a partial merger with the Southern Indoor Football League, which resulted in all of its Eastern teams merging into the SIFL and the AIFA only maintaining its western teams. The league's western component, which remained separate of the merger, had indicated it would play as the AIFA West for the 2011 season but ceased operations January 2011. The league announced it would be relaunching as American Indoor Football in time for spring 2012.

After the 2016 season, the AIF ceased operations with the former AIF owner stating his support for the recently created Arena Developmental League. In 2021, league owner John Morris announced he planned to relaunch the AIF for the 2022 season, though no games would be played until 2023.

In 2023, it was announced that the league was relaunched by president and commissioner John Morris with four new teams: the Cedar Rapids River Kings, Corpus Christi Tritons, RiverCity Rage and West Virginia Miners. The Columbus Lions rejoined the league after winning the most recent AIF Championship in 2016.

In 2025, a coalition led by River Kings owner Dominic Montero led a takeover of the AIF after Morris and the remaining teams left for other leagues, with Larry Clark Jr. as its primary owner. Montero, who had left the league office to focus on owning the Cavalry, was expelled from his own league midway through the 2026 season. The West Michigan Ironmen, who had joined the AIF as a charter member of its 2025 incarnation and won both championships, led a takeover of the league ahead of its 2027 season.

== History ==
=== AIFL era (2005–2006) ===
The league has its roots in the Atlantic Indoor Football League, which began play in 2005 under the leadership of Andrew Haines. The first team to join the AIFL was the Johnstown RiverHawks. The league began with six teams, all of them based in the eastern United States. Two teams played all of their games on the road, and the regular season was cut short two weeks because of teams being unable to secure venues for playoff games. In the 2005–06 offseason, the league changed its name to the American Indoor Football League, while nine expansion teams entered the league and a tenth (the Rome Renegades) joined from the National Indoor Football League.

The 2006 season was marred by the folding of two teams, and the league used semi-pro teams to fill scheduling vacancies. The league was briefly acquired by Greens Worldwide, Inc., the owners of the amateur North American Football League, during the 2006 season, but they terminated the contract soon afterwards. Nine teams left the league after the season, including four who split off to create the short-lived World Indoor Football League.

=== AIFA era (2007–2010) ===
On October 2, 2006, a massive reorganization took place as Morris and Michael Mink set up a new league, which absorbed all of the remaining AIFL franchises, and Haines was ousted. (Haines would go on to create the Mid-Atlantic Hockey League in 2007, before similar stability problems led to the forced divestiture of that league as well. Haines would, in April 2010, announce he was relaunching his league as the Ultimate Indoor Football League beginning in 2011 and revived two defunct former AIFL teams.) The league took on the American Indoor Football Association name at the same time.

The 2007 season was relatively successful for the league, as all 112 scheduled games were played and no teams folded mid-season, a major improvement over the past two seasons (when the AIFA was known as the AIFL). The AIFA Championship Bowl I was a neutral site game held in Florence, South Carolina. In addition, the league held its first All-Star Game the same weekend, also in Florence. League owners stated that the neutral site was chosen so that both games could be televised to obtain nationwide exposure for the league.

The league then expanded nationwide; some individual teams were able to acquire several players with NFL experience, a sign that the league had achieved a level on par with leagues such as af2. The league earned a major television contract as well: On September 17, 2007, The American Indoor Football Association owners John Morris and Michael Mink announced that the league signed a three-year national television broadcast, mobile phone broadcast, and webcast licensing agreement with Simply 4Me Incorporated (d.b.a. SimplyMe TV). However, that deal was subsequently cancelled. Later in the season, FSN Pittsburgh agreed to pick up the remaining games; Erie, Pennsylvania-based Image Sports Network was also involved with the league.

Eight teams participating in the league in 2007 did not return for the 2008 season, including the 2007 champion Lakeland Thunderbolts. The AIFA became the third league since 2004 (excluding the folded WIFL and NIFL before its folding) to lose its standing champion (the 2004 NIFL champion Lexington Horsemen left to join the newly created UIF and later were in af2, and the 2006 champion Billings Outlaws also left to join two years later). However, nine teams signed on to begin play in 2008, and the league created a Western Conference. In 2007, the team farthest west was based in Mississippi; in 2008, the team farthest west was based in Arizona. Three of the four teams who had won the league championship to that point were no longer active league members.

The 2009 season culminated in AIFA Championship Bowl III, hosted by the Western Conference champion Wyoming Cavalry on July 25, 2009. The game, played before 6,500 fans at the Casper Events Center, saw the Reading Express defeat the Wyoming Cavalry for their first title, 65–42.

As the 2010 season approached, AIFA continued to expand its nationwide footprint. Expansion franchises had been added in Richmond, Virginia; Yakima, Washington; Wasilla, Alaska (believed to be the smallest city in America to host a national professional football franchise) and Wenatchee, Washington. The moves gave the AIFA a much more significant presence on the West Coast of the United States. To accommodate this, and to keep travel expenses down, for the 2010 season the AIFA adopted a scheduling system that effectively treated the Eastern and Western conferences as separate leagues, with no regular-season crossover between the two conferences. The league also secured a television contract with AMGTV, which was to syndicate a "Game of the Week" package to regional sports networks and its network of low-powered broadcast stations.

In 2010, the Baltimore Mariners completed the league's first-ever perfect season by winning all fourteen regular season games and winning AIFA Championship Bowl IV.

=== Split, partial merger with the SIFL and first cessation of operations ===
The AIFA arranged a split and partial merger with the Southern Indoor Football League after the 2010 season. As part of the deal, Morris acquired the rights to the Eastern Conference teams and merged them into the SIFL, while Mink retained the western conference teams, rights to the AIFA name, and the television contract which was extended through 2013.

the Tucson Thunder Kats announced it would be suspending operations until 2012 and the AIFA West announced that it would begin its season with four teams, beginning in March 2011. In January 2011 the league informed the remaining three teams that there would not be a fourth team representing Eugene, Oregon as the league had earlier promised. The league attempted to work out a schedule with the remaining three teams, but the Reno Barons and Stockton Wolves were unwilling to go forward with such a schedule and broke from the league. Both teams operated as the two-team "Western Indoor Football Association" in 2011, each playing whatever semi-pro teams were willing to face them in addition to each other. With only the Yakima Valley Warriors left, the AIFA ceased operations; it said that it would attempt to relaunch in 2012 with eight to 12 teams in at least two regions of the United States.

In June 2011, Morris released a statement indicating he still represented the AIFA when he purchased the assets of the Fayetteville Force.

=== First AIF incarnation (2011–2016) ===
AIF Logo 2011–2016

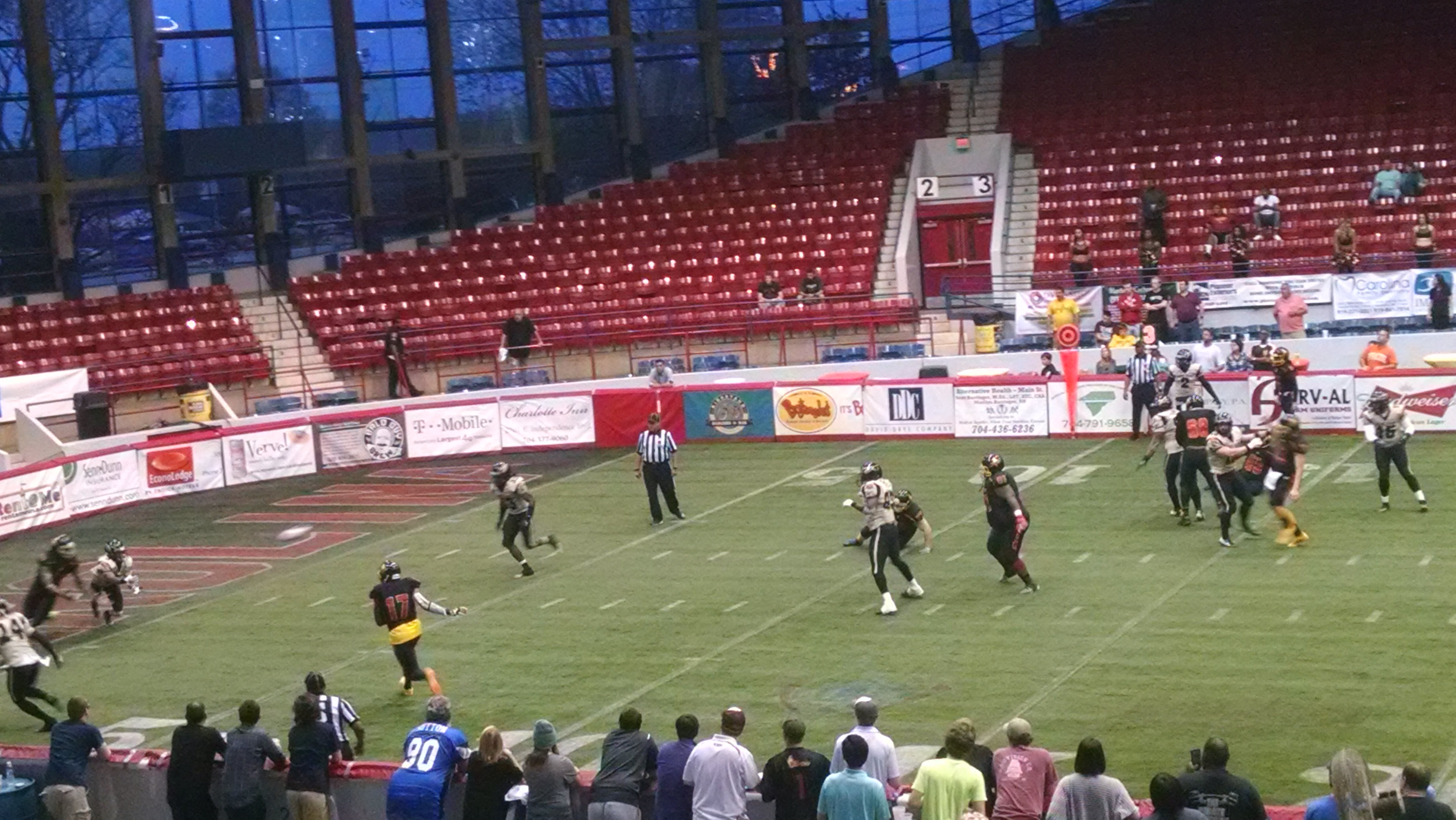
Triangle Torch (black jerseys with and red and yellow accents) vs. Lehigh Valley Steelhawks (gold jerseys with black accents) during a game at Dorton Arena, March 25, 2016

On October 27, 2011, the AIFA announced it was relaunching as American Indoor Football (AIF). The move came in light of the dissolution of the SIFL and its breakup into the Professional Indoor Football League and the Lone Star Football League. AIF announced its intentions to absorb the three remaining SIFL teams not in either the PIFL or LSFL (the Harrisburg Stampede, Trenton Steel and Carolina Speed), as well as the remaining teams that would have participated in the AIFA West. AIF intended to launch an amateur division as well.

In 2015, the league absorbed the remains of the Continental Indoor Football League, picking up the Saginaw Sting and Chicago Blitz from that league; the CIFL Web site became a redirect to AIF's. (The two other surviving teams from that league chose to play in other leagues: Erie decided to join the PIFL, while the Marion Blue Racers fulfilled an earlier promise to join the X-League). In homage to the CIFL, AIF split into two conferences, one bearing the American name and the other (which includes both CIFL refugees) named the Continental Conference. The conference names were changed to Northern and Southern for the 2016 season.

The 2016 season saw the league grow from nine teams to a total of 28 announced teams. However, only 21 teams ever played a league game that season, including four teams that folded midseason and several other teams cancelling scheduled games. The Columbus Lions, which joined for 2016, would finish the season undefeated and win the championship. The Lions then announced that they were leaving the league due to the league's instability, especially in the Southern Division where the Lions were the only team that did not have a cancelled or rescheduled game. On July 7, 2016, the Lions' owners announced the formation of a new league, the Arena Developmental League. On July 13, the Lehigh Valley Steelhawks also announced they were leaving the AIF.

In response, AIF owner Jim Morris announced on July 18, 2016, that the AIF was ceasing operations immediately. He also announced his support of the new Arena Developmental League (which later changed its name to National Arena League before its inaugural season) and hoped the new league would take on many of the former AIF teams.

The Buffalo Blitz (formerly the Buffalo Lightning) used the official AIF football in their press announcement upon joining the Can-Am Indoor Football League, which was created by announced AIF 2017 expansion team Vermont Bucks. The Can-Am also used the AIF footballs in games during their only season.

=== Second AIF incarnation (2023–2024) ===
On July 3, 2023, John Morris announced that the league would indeed relaunch in 2024 with four new teams: Cedar Rapids River Kings, Corpus Christi Tritons, RiverCity Rage and West Virginia Miners. On August 4, 2023, the league announced that the Columbus Lions, the last team to win the AIF Championship in 2016, were returning to the league. On August 24, 2023, the league announced that the Amarillo Venom would return and join the AIF for the 2024 season. On September 11, 2023, the league announced that an expansion team to be based in Albany, Georgia, would also join the AIF for 2024 as its eighth franchise. On September 29, 2023, the league announced the Beaumont Renegades as their ninth team for the 2024 season, but on October 30, the league announced that the Renegades will play an exhibition schedule only in 2024, and will join the league full time in 2025, while the AIF granted West Virginia Miners release from the league after change in the team ownership group. Cedar Rapids negotiated its release from the league midway through the 2024 season in a dispute between the league and owner Dominic Montero, after which John Morris resigned his position from AIF immediately thereafter. Following the end of the 2024 season, all of the remaining teams in AIF departed for other leagues, with the Tritons joining Arena Football One and the other teams joining the National Arena League. The Harrisburg Stampede ceased operations on December 3, 2024. In a statement on its social media platforms on October 13, the former AIF—which maintained control of the league's online shop and social media—announced that "As of now, the AIF has ceased operations indefinitely" and that any league that used the AIF name did so without their endorsement, to which Montero replied "this page will be regained in Court" [sic].

=== Third AIF incarnation (2025–2026) ===
With the AIF effectively empty, Montero announced in late 2024 that the Cedar Rapids River Kings would be returning to play under the AIF brand, effectively conducting a hostile takeover of the league. This incarnation of AIF would be co-owned by Montero and Larry Clark Jr.

On November 5, 2024, the AIF named Mike McCoy as commissioner. McCoy had previously spent the 2024 season as deputy commissioner of the Arena Football League and previously had been the final commissioner of Champions Indoor Football. On Christmas Day, December 25, 2024, the AIF welcomed the West Michigan Ironmen back to the league, where they previously played their inaugural season in 2016; the Ironmen had been playing in its own league Great Lakes Arena Football and will continue to play teams from GLAF in addition to their AIF schedule. The Ironmen joined the River Kings and a new team, the Coralville Chaos, which shares ownership with the River Kings.

On January 20, 2025, the league announced the signing of a two-game contract with the Hidden Gemz Phenoms, a traveling team run by Hidden Gemz Sports Scouting, a sports scouting rep group. By the start of the 2025 season, the Phenoms, GLAF champion Michigan Avengerz, Detroit Ravens and Midwest Typhoons had been classified as "AIF Travel Teams" on the AIF Web site. The season began February 14, 2025 with West Michigan's 75–7 rout of Coralville, with the Ironmen following that with a 55–0 shutout of Cedar Rapids on February 22. Mike McCoy has since left the league as commissioner. The league removed the Phenoms for "not being prepared to travel", which Hidden Gemz Sports Scouting has vehemently denied claiming the league "breached their contract" on their Facebook page, accusations that the league themselves has denied. They were replaced by the Ohio Blitz prior to the game with the River Kings in March. The Typhoons' game against the Chaos set for April 23rd was cancelled due to the arena having to be used for the Iowa Heartlanders ECHL hockey team's playoff series with no make-up date planned.

In an interview with KCRG-TV, representatives with Cedar Rapids and Coralville originally indicated plans to revive the Wyoming Mustangs for the 2026 season, but (presumably because Arena Football One chairman Steven Titus still owns the intellectual properties to that name) opted for a new version of the Wyoming Cavalry instead, reviving the brand of a previous AIF team in Casper that played in various leagues (including the AIF) from 2000 to 2014. The previous owners of the Wyoming Cavalry, Mike and Argeri Layton, have approved of the use of the Cavalry name for the new team. The official announcement took place on March 28, 2025, with a press conference that took place on May 1, 2025, in Gillette, Wyoming. On April 1, 2025, the Pennsylvania Union of Harrisburg, Pennsylvania, announced on their Facebook page that they have agreed to join the league. They replaced the since-folded Harrisburg Stampede. It was also announced, albeit unconfirmed by any media and social media, that Mario Flores, owner of the Ironmen, plans to bring two new teams from Michigan into the league to start play in 2026. The team names, logos, venues and cities will be announced at a later date. Also, the 2025 AIF Championship Game was played between the Chaos and Ironmen at Trinity Health Arena in Muskegon on Saturday, May 3, 2025, and was carried via live stream by KLLB Media, LLC, based in Whitehall, Michigan, and simulcast on NY 48 WWON-TV, an internet television station based in Brooklyn, New York. WWON will also carry Pennsylvania Union home games on their station via the team's YouTube channel beginning in 2026.

On May 11, 2025, the league officially announced that former Amarillo Venom head coach Rick "Prez" Kranz was named the new head coach and general manager of the River Kings. On June 2, 2025, the River Kings name was officially retired (Montero still owns the intellectual property) and the team reverted back to the original name of the Cedar Rapids Titans. As of July 2025, Montero is now owner of only one team, the Cavalry, which he co-owns with Roach. Roach is also now the sole owner of the Chaos while Kranz and Mike Thorson are now co-owners of the Titans. Roach retains his title of team president for all three teams. On July 24, 2025, after only one season in Coralville, the Chaos relocated to Traverse City, Michigan, and were rebranded the North Michigan Muskies. On the same day, the league announced that original Ironmen general manager and head coach Nate Smith was named the new commissioner. On September 3, 2025, the league welcomed the Tyler Crude as its sixth team and latest expansion team, however were not initially able to get an arena lease with the Oil Palace due to the arena facing auction. On October 7, 2025, the league announced the addition of the expansion Odessa Drillers to play at the Ector County Coliseum in Odessa. The Drillers were later announced to play an independent schedule while still considered an AIF expansion team. On December 16, 2025, the league named longtime arena/indoor football veteran Terrence Foster as its new commissioner. On December 27, 2025, the league had announced the first expansion for 2027, the Dickinson Dragons based out of Dickinson, North Dakota. However, those plans have since been scrapped. On December 31, 2025, the league would appoint former Super Bowl champion Patrick Johnson as senior consultant to the league effective immediately. On January 16, 2026, the league on the Facebook page announced the addition of the Midland Frac-Attack from Texas, who will play an independent schedule in 2026.

The league began celebrating its 20th Anniversary with three games, one league contest and two non-league contests in 2026, however, after playing one road game against the Ironmen, the North Michigan Muskies' membership with the AIF was terminated on February 20, 2026, effective immediately following a formal League compliance review that found irregularities with the franchise and a vote by the league's executive committee. This was believed to have ended the brief tumultuous history of the Chaos/Muskies franchise while the league also announced that the Pennsylvania Union, an AIF-affiliated road team for 2026 would assume of all the Muskies' road contests for the other AIF teams so that no major adjustments would be made. However, the Muskies were later brought back for one night only against the Wyoming Cavalry on March 28th featuring several Cavalry players to fill the void left following the departure of several previously signed Muskie players. It was considered an inner-squad non-league game likely in defiance of the termination. The Cavalry won 44-12.

The Central New York Blue Devils were supposed to be a semi-pro team playing as an independent, but have since become an associate member for the remainder as the season and their game will count as league games.

Starting February 16, 2026, internet television station KSQU-TV Channel 8Y Yreka/Mount Shasta, California began carrying replays of all past and present AIF games. While the Blue Devils reached an agreement for their road games in 2026, league and non-league, be simulcast on NY 48 WWON Internet TV Brooklyn, New York, which had also scheduled the Union. Their home games would also be carried starting in 2027 and Beyond.

Montero was expelled from AIF for a second time on March 30, 2026, when the Wyoming Cavalry were suspended from the league following a bench-clearing brawl during the team's March 20 game against Cedar Rapids; Montero and co-owner/team president Roach refused to cooperate with disciplinary and compliance measures related to the brawl. Though the AIF left an opening for the Cavalry to return in 2027 if the team came back into compliance, Montero and Roach indicated unwillingness to do so, blamed the expulsion on teams not wanting to travel to Gillette, and vowed to play out their arena lease for the 2026 season using independent opponents and join a new league in 2027. In interviews with the Gillette News-Record released on April 1, Montero and AIF Commissioner Terence Foster struck more conciliatory tones over the incidents, with Montero acknowledging that players had been drinking alcohol during the game, and Foster specifying that the irregularities pertained to issues such as a lack of padding on the dasher boards, and unsafe turf that still bore the branding of a previous franchise against AIF regulations, which Montero expressed a willingness to fix. Foster also stated that he was willing to give Montero benefit of the doubt regarding his prior expulsions, noting that he may have been stretched too thin operating the Cavalry, Muskies and previously being in the league office. Both parties noted that Gillette had been a successful market for the league, with the Cavalry continuing to draw over 2,000 fans to their games as the previous incarnation of the team had done.

As of April 2026, Fort Stockton High School broadcast class/internet channel Tumbleweed+ began carrying Drillers and Frac-Attack home games on their Facebook and YouTube channels. The staff includes adult commentators and a staff consisting totally of high school students, a first for professional sports. On May 4, 2026, the league declared the Ironmen league champions for the second consecutive year after the championship game scheduled for May 9, 2026, was cancelled due to an "unavoidable venue conflict" with the Muskegon Lumberjacks hockey team. The league explored multiple alternatives to reschedule the game. But according to the league office, "doing so has been deemed unfeasible due to logistical constraints, including player housing and availability challenges impacting the Cedar Rapids Titans", their scheduled opponent. The league later clarified that the housing complex housing the Titans players refused to extend the lease, despite West Michigan agreeing to pay for the cost, and thus the players returned home on May 5, disbanding the team. The next day, on May 6, 2026, the Titans announced on their Facebook page that head coach and general manager Rick Kranz was "no longer with" the team.

=== Fourth incarnation (2027 to future) ===
Following the season, Ironmen owner Mario Flores announced he was leading a takeover of the AIF. This would be the second league the Ironmen had established, as it had operated Great Lakes Arena Football before joining AIF in 2025, which will effectively be revived as a division of AIF as part of the takeover, with the other division being the Lone Star Division in Texas. Flores rejected the idea of joining one of the national leagues, citing expansion fees and travel expenses that, according to him, would ruin the Ironmen's financial viability, while at the same time bemoaning the instability of the alternative model of smaller regional leagues that had led to many teams failing.

Flores's concept for the league would have the Pennsylvania Union and Central New York Blue Devils not be playing in their home cities, and instead operate all of the franchises in the Great Lakes division out of the two arenas in Muskegon and Cedar Rapids.

On August 25, the AIF released that Domonic Montero and the Wyoming Cavalry would be terminated immediately from the league, no longer representing the AIF.

On September 7, it was revealed that semi-pro team Indy Bison would join the AIF.

On September 22, the league had an influx of teams joining the league including the: Forest Area Woodsmen, Knoxville Bandits, Michigan Grizzlies, Michigan Raptors and Milwaukee Aviators.

On September 24, it was revealed on team socials' that the Upstate Timberwolves would replace the Central New York Blue Devils, and the Midland Frac-Attack are leaving to another league.

== Basic rule differences ==
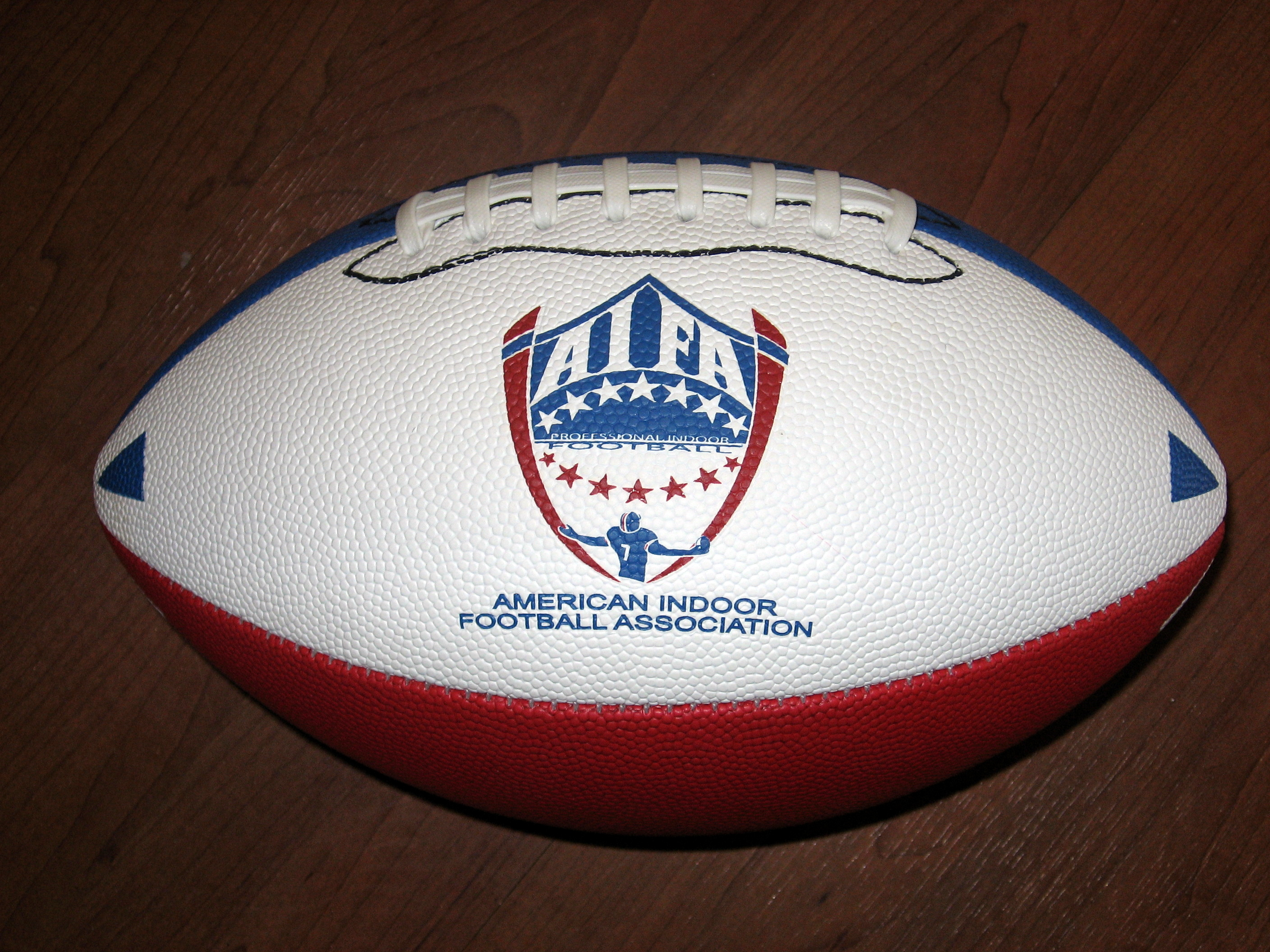
The AIFA's red, white, and blue football

- AIF do not use rebound nets found in the Arena Football League and Arena Football One.
- One linebacker can move flat to flat but is required to stay in drop zone.
- Platooning and free substitution are allowed, meaning players do not have to play both offense and defense.
- Franchises are required to have at least nine players that originated from within a 120-mile radius of the team's home town.
- The AIF ball pattern is similar to that of the basketball in the American Basketball Association, with red, white, and blue panels as opposed to the brown colored football of most leagues. This pattern originated in the AIFL and was also used in the UIFL.

Two rule changes appeared to be inspired by Canadian football rules:

- Two offensive players can be in motion at one time. The AF1 allows only one in motion.
- The AIF recognizes the single (also known as an uno or rouge). If a kickoff goes through the uprights, or if the receiving team does not advance the ball out of the end zone on a kickoff, the kicking team is awarded one point and the ball is spotted at the opponent's five yard line.

== Teams ==
=== Current teams ===
Team	Location	Arena	Capacity	Founded	Joining	Head coach	Owner(s)
Cedar Rapids Titans	Cedar Rapids, Iowa	Alliant Energy PowerHouse	9,012	2011	2023	Vacant	Mike Thorson
Delaware Legacy	Wilmington, Delaware	TBA	TBA	2026	2027	TBA	Lew Johnson
Forest Area Woodsmen	Kalamazoo, Michigan	Travel team		2026	2027	Vacant	Jake Shanks and Tito Rodriguez
Indy Bison	Indianapolis, Indiana	TBA	TBA	2022	2027	Terry Moore	Amy Myers
Michigan Grizzlies	Lansing, Michigan	Travel team		2024	2027	Tierra Derrick-Jones	Chris Frision Jr
Michigan Raptors	Flint, Michigan	Dort financial Center		2025	2027	Jeff Pittock	
Wisconsin Aviators	Oshkosh, Wisconsin	Oshkosh Arena	3,500	2023	2027	Lawrence Peters	
Knoxville Bandits	Suwanee, Georgia	Atlanta Silverbacks Suwanee Indoor	TBA	2022	2027	LG Gregory	Frederick Elliott
Odessa Drillers	Odessa, Texas	Ector County Coliseum	5,131	2026	2026	Brandon Henderson	Community-owned
Pennsylvania Union	Harrisburg, Pennsylvania	Farm Show Arena	2,100	2020	2026	Jerome Junior	Brian Dykes
Upstate Timberwolves	Syracuse, New York	TBA	TBA	2026	2027	TBA	Trey Grenga
West Michigan Ironmen	Muskegon, Michigan	Trinity Health Arena	4,000	2016	2016, 2025	Nate Smith	Mario Flores

=== Map of teams ===
🟦-Southern Division 🟥-Northern Division

AIF team locations

=== Former teams (94) ===
- Abilene Warriors
- Amarillo Venom
- Arctic Predators
- Arizona Adrenaline
- Arizona Outlaws
- ASI Panthers
- Atlanta Sharks
- Atlanta Vultures
- Augusta Colts
- Austin Colts
- Baltimore Blackbirds
- Baltimore Mariners
- Beaumont Renegades (never played)
- Buffalo Lightning
- Canton Legends
- Carolina Speed
- Cape Fear Heroes
- Carolina Ghostriders
- Central Florida Jaguars
- Central Penn Capitals
- Central Penn Patriots
- Chattahoochee Valley Vipers
- Chicago Blitz
- Cleveland Patriots
- Columbus Lions
- Coralville Chaos
- Corpus Christi Fury
- Corpus Christi Tritons
- D.C. Armor
- Danville Demolition
- Daytona Beach Thunder
- Dickinson Dragons (Never Played)
- Erie RiverRats/Storm
- Erie Freeze
- Fayetteville Guard
- Flint Rivergators
- Florence Phantoms
- Florida Stingrays
- Florida Tarpons
- Georgia Firebirds
- Gulf Coast Raiders
- Harrisburg Stampede
- High Country Grizzlies (never played)
- Huntington Heroes
- Johnstown Riverhawks
- Lehigh Valley Steelhawks
- Louisiana Cottonmouths
- Marion Blue Racers
- Maryland Eagles
- Maryland Reapers
- Miami Valley Silverbacks
- Mississippi MudCats
- Mississippi Raiders
- Montgomery Bears
- Myrtle Beach Freedom
- Nevada Lynx
- New Jersey Revolution
- New Mexico Stars
- New Mexico Wildcats
- North Michigan Muskies
- Northern Kentucky Nightmare
- Northshore Gators
- Ogden Knights
- Ontario Warriors
- Philadelphia Yellow Jackets
- Pineywoods Bucks
- Raleigh Rebels
- Reading Express
- Richmond Bandits
- Richmond Raiders
- River City Raiders
- RiverCity Rage
- Roc City Thunder
- Rochester Raiders
- Rome Renegades
- Saginaw Sting
- Savannah Steam
- South Carolina Force
- South Carolina Ravens
- Steel City Menace
- Steubenville Stampede
- Syracuse Soldiers
- Tallahassee Titans
- Texas Stealth
- Triangle Torch
- Tucson Thunder Kats
- Tyler Crude (never played)
- Utah Saints
- Utah Valley Thunder
- Vermont Bucks
- Virginia Badgers
- Wenatchee Valley Venom
- West Virginia Miners (never played)
- Winston Wildcats
- Wyoming Cavalry (original)
- Wyoming Cavalry (recent)
- Yakima Valley Warriors

=== Substitute teams ===
- Chambersburg Cardinals (2006)
- Columbus Blackhawks (2006)
- Dallas Falcons (2024)
- Detroit Ravens (2025/2026)
- Michigan Avengerz (2025)
- Ohio Blitz (2025)
- Philadelphia Scorpions (2006)

== Championship games ==
Year	Winner	Score	Runner-Up
2005	Richmond Bandits	56–30	Erie Freeze
2006	Canton Legends	61–40	Rome Renegades
2007	Lakeland Thunderbolts	54–49	Reading Express
2008	Florence Phantoms	48–12	Wyoming Cavalry
2009	Reading Express	65–42	Wyoming Cavalry
2010	Baltimore Mariners	57–42	Wyoming Cavalry
2012	Cape Fear Heroes	79–27	California Eagles
2013	Harrisburg Stampede	52–37	Cape Fear Heroes
2014	Baltimore Mariners	45–44	Cape Fear Heroes
2015	York Capitals	58–30	Chicago Blitz
2016	Columbus Lions	74–32	West Michigan Ironmen
2024	Columbus Lions	46–20	Corpus Christi Tritons
2025	West Michigan Ironmen	76-24	Coralville Chaos
2026	West Michigan Ironmen	n/a (cancelled)	Cedar Rapids Titans

== See also ==
- List of American and Canadian football leagues
