= Iowa Heartlanders =

- City: Coralville, Iowa
- League: ECHL
- Conference: Western
- Division: Central
- Founded: 2021
- Home arena: Xtream Arena powered by Mediacom
- Colors: Black, sunrise yellow, grey, white
- Owner: Michael Devlin
- Head coach: Chuck Weber
- Captain: Jonny Sorenson
- Affiliates: Minnesota Wild (NHL); Iowa Wild (AHL)
- Website: iowaheartlanders.com

Franchise history
- 2021–present: Iowa Heartlanders

The Iowa Heartlanders are an inactive professional minor league ice hockey team in the ECHL based in Coralville, Iowa. The team began play in the 2021–22 ECHL season, playing their home games at Xtream Arena and in March 2026 announced it was suspending operations for the 2026-2027 season.

== History ==
=== Early History (2020–22) ===
On September 17, 2020, Newfoundland Growlers' majority owner Dean MacDonald (through his group Deacon Sports and Entertainment) came to an agreement with the city of Coralville to place an ECHL team in Xtream Arena, pending league approval, for the 2021–22 season. On January 12, 2021, the team was approved by the ECHL Board of Governors to join the league for the 2021–22 season. In March 2021, the team announced it had hired former ECHL commissioner Brian McKenna as team president. The team name, Iowa Heartlanders, was announced on May 20, 2021. On June 17, the Heartlanders announced they would be the affiliate of the Minnesota Wild. On July 27, 2021, the Heartlanders named Gerry Fleming as their inaugural head coach.

On October 22, 2021, the Heartlanders played their first game against the Kansas City Mavericks and won 7–4 at home with more than 4000 in attendance. In November, Kris Bennett was named the team's first captain, with Jake Linhart and Riese Zmolek given alternate captain roles.

The Heartlanders finished their inaugural season with 29 wins, which included a franchise-best seven-game winning streak from mid-February - early March 2022.

In the summer of 2022, former head coach Gerry Fleming accepted an opportunity in the DEL (top German pro league) with a club in Frankfurt, Germany. The move paved the way for Fleming's assistant coach Derek Damon to take over the head coaching position. Damon was officially announced as the second coach in team history on July 5, 2022.

=== Transition to new ownership (2023–24) ===
In July 2023, Michael Devlin became the team's majority owner. The switch helped improve the team's local direction and resources. Devlin founded Heartlanders Hockey LLC and brought a strong hockey background to the team, having already been the primary owner of the USHL's Des Moines Buccaneers.

The team's third season (2023–24) was filled with a number of records: the club tied its longest winning streak ever and achieved its longest points streak ever (9). On April 13, 2024, the Heartlanders sold out Xtream Arena for the first time ever, in a 7-4 win over the Kansas City Mavericks to conclude the season.

=== Best season in team history (2024–25) ===
The Heartlanders achieved their best season ever in 2024–25, winning 36 games (36–25–7–4, 83 points) and finishing 3rd in the Central Division. The team showed improvement in the stands as well; four of the top-ten attended games in team history came in the second half of the regular season, including the highest-attended game in team history on Apr. 12, 2025 vs. Cincinnati.

Iowa's overall consistency and team defense was a key for Derek Damon's squad. Iowa started off with a 13–5–3 record, had multiple six-game winning streaks, and only suffered one slump in March where the team went 0–4–2 over a two-weekend span.

Rookie goaltenders William Rousseau (2.69 GAA) and Kyle McClellan (2.62 GAA) were rocks in net throughout the regular season; both saw time in the Kelly Cup playoffs.

Yuki Miura, the team Captain, led the team with a career-high 21 goals. Rookie T.J. Walsh topped the squad with 43 points.

Iowa faced division rival Fort Wayne in the Central Division Semifinals. The Heartlanders won game 1 on the road, then took a 3–2 series lead with home victories in Game 4 and Game 5. Fort Wayne came back to win the series, taking advantage of a Heartlanders squad that was missing its top line due to injury.

=== Suspension of Operations ===
On March 9, 2026, team owner Michael Devlin along with the Board of Governors of the ECHL came to an agreement to suspend the team's operations for the 2026–27.

“This was an incredibly difficult decision that followed months of careful evaluation,” said Heartlanders owner Michael Devlin. “Despite significant efforts to stabilize and strengthen the organization, we concluded that stepping back for a season is the most responsible course while we review long-term solutions. As stewards of the team, we believe this step gives the organization the best opportunity to return on a stronger and more sustainable footing.”

== Season-by-season records ==
Regular season										Playoffs				
Season	GP	W	L	OTL	SOL	Pts	GF	GA	Standing	Year	1st round	2nd round	3rd round	Kelly Cup
2021–22	72	29	33	9	1	68	229	263	7th, Central	2022	did not qualify			
2022–23	72	22	36	13	1	58	189	256	7th, Central	2023	did not qualify			
2023–24	72	27	37	6	2	62	186	250	7th, Central	2024	did not qualify			
2024–25	72	36	25	7	4	83	201	206	3rd, Central	2025	L, 3–4, FW	—	—	—
2025–26	72	24	40	5	3	56	188	252	7th, Central	2026	did not qualify			
