= The Oil Palace =

Sports venue in Tyler, Texas

- Interactive map of The Oil Palace
- Location: 10408 Texas 64, Tyler, Texas 75707
- Coordinates: 32.3287°N 95.2388°W
- Capacity: 9,000

Construction
- Groundbreaking: 1955
- Opened: 1983
- Renovated: 2018

The Oil Palace is a 6,960-seat multi-purpose arena located on Texas State Highway 64 just outside the eastern city limits of Tyler, Texas.

== History ==
The Oil palace's story started in 1955 when Bobby Manziel, Sr. wanted to open a venue to host boxing matches. Manziel, a former amateur boxer, manager of boxer Buddy Turman, and close friend of World heavyweight Champion Jack Dempsey, was a successful businessman who dreamed of a 20,000 seat complex in East Texas. His vision would have been the only all-year air-conditioned stadium in the U.S. Dempsey even agreed to relocate and help manage the center. Unfortunately, Manziel died in 1956 and the 56,000 square-foot building's construction came to a halt. In 1981, Bobby Manziel, Jr. picked up where his father left off by converting the unfinished arena into what it is today. In November 1983, after years of remodeling, the construction was complete and thousands attended the opening ceremony to watch Barbara Mandrell perform.

On March 10, 2018, a $2 million renovation was unveiled for a concert starring Jamey Johnson.

In August 2025, the arena was facing auction when its owners "failed to perform the obligations" within their deed.
