= Raleigh Rebels =

General information
- Founded: 2005
- Folded: 2006
- Headquartered: Raleigh, North Carolina at Dorton Arena
- Colors: Red, White, Blue, Black

Personnel
- Head coach: Dan Pifer
- President: Harry Pierce

Team history
- Raleigh Rebels (2006)

Home fields
- Dorton Arena (2006)

League / conference affiliations
- American Indoor Football League (2006)

Championships
- Division championships: 0; 0

The Raleigh Rebels were a professional indoor football team based out of Raleigh, North Carolina. They played their home games at the Dorton Arena and were members of the American Indoor Football League (AIFL).

During the team's inaugural season, they played an all-road schedule as a favor to the league (the Ghostriders were also playing an all-road schedule, since they were a quick formation of the Carolina Sharks), along with the fact that they couldn't get a lease for an arena in Raleigh until 2006. During their first year, the Rebels compiled a mediocre record of 3-7, almost beating the Canton Legends for fourth place. Since the league had only six teams, everyone of them (including the Rebels) made the playoffs. Their inaugural year ended with a thud as they lost in the first round to the Legends.

The Rebels' second year turned out to be better than their inaugural year. They finished the regular season at 8-6 and automatically went to the Southern Conference championship game, due to the Richmond Bandits' suspension, making them forfeit. However, a week's worth of rest couldn't prepare them for the top-seeded Rome Renegades, as they fell 63-14.

Following their AIFL playoff loss, the Rebels announced their intentions to move to the WIFL with the Rome Renegades. They would have become charters member of this newly formed league. Despite changing their name to the Carolina Bombers on August 24, they would never have a chance to play in the new league, because on October 16, they ceased all operations, along with the Rome Renegades.

== Season-By-Season ==
Season records
Season	W	L	T	Finish	Playoff results
Raleigh Rebels (AIFL)
2005	3	7	0	5th League	Lost First Round (Canton)
2006	8	6	0	3rd Southern	Lost SC Championship (Rome)
Totals	12	15	0	(including playoffs)	
