= West Michigan Ironmen =

American indoor football team

Logo

General information
- Founded: 2016
- Headquartered: Muskegon, Michigan
- Colors: Garnet, gold, black, white
- westmichiganironmen.com

Personnel
- Owner: Mario Flores
- General manager: Nate Smith
- Head coach: Nate Smith
- President: Mario Flores

Team history
- West Michigan Ironmen (2016–present)

Home fields
- Trinity Health Arena (2016–present)

League / conference affiliations
- American Indoor Football (2016); Northern Division (2016); Champions Indoor Football (2017); North Conference (2017); Midwest Professional Indoor Football (2018); American Arena League (2019–2021); Midwest Division (2019–2021); Arena Professional Football League (2022); Great Lakes Arena Football (2023–2024); American Indoor Football (2025-present)

Championships
- League championships: 3: MPIF: 2018 GLAF: 2023 AIF: 2025, 2026
- Conference championships: 0; 0
- Division championships: 4: AIF Northern: 2016; AAL Midwest: 2019, 2021, 2022

Playoff appearances (7)
- 2016, 2018, 2019, 2023, 2024, 2025, 2026

The West Michigan Ironmen are a professional indoor football team based in Muskegon, Michigan (and representing the larger region which also includes Grand Rapids and Holland), the Ironmen play their home games at Trinity Health Arena. The team joined American Indoor Football (AIF) in 2016. The AIF ceased operations following the 2016 season, leaving the Ironmen without a league. They joined Champions Indoor Football for the 2017 season. For the 2018 season, the team was originally announced to have joined the Indoor Football League, however, the team was forced to sit out the 2018 Indoor Football League season. The team was then sold and played in the regional Midwest Professional Indoor Football for the 2018 season until they could rejoin the CIF in 2019. However, they were not among the list of members for the 2019 CIF season and instead joined the American Arena League. After playing in smaller leagues, the Ironmen returned to the AIF in 2025.

The Ironmen are the second indoor football team to play in Muskegon, after the Muskegon Thunder which played in the Continental Indoor Football League for the 2007 and 2008 seasons and later the Indoor Football League for its inaugural 2009 season before moving to Grand Rapids and becoming the West Michigan ThunderHawks the next year. They would fold after one season.

== Franchise history ==
=== American Indoor Football (Morris) ===
In July 2015, it was announced that Terrence Williams was awarded an expansion team in American Indoor Football (AIF) for the 2016 season. After a "name-the-team" contest, the nickname Ironmen was chosen for the expansion franchise.

The Ironmen dropped their first game of the season, but would win every game following that, en route to a berth in the AIF Championship Game. The Ironmen would lose the AIF Championship Game to the Columbus Lions, 32–74, after the game was cut short by multiple altercations leading the Ironmen to leave the field citing safety reasons.

On July 18, 2016, the AIF announced it was ceasing operations leaving the team without a league.

=== Champions Indoor Football and Indoor Football League ===
The Ironmen announced on September 26, that it was joining Champions Indoor Football (CIF) for the 2017 season. The Ironmen went 4–8 and missed the playoffs.

On September 12, 2017, the Indoor Football League announced it had added the West Michigan Ironmen, as well as the Bloomington Edge, from the CIF. The CIF then attempted to sue the IFL, Edge, and Ironmen for leaving the CIF after the two teams had already signed league affiliation agreements with the CIF for the 2018 season. While the CIF did drop the lawsuit against the IFL, it filed for an injunction against the Edge and Ironmen teams from participating in the IFL for breaking the terms of their signed affiliation agreements. A temporary injunction from participation against the two teams was granted on January 31, 2018, with the judge citing that both teams had been bribed into breaking their contracts with the CIF.

Both teams participation in the IFL was suspended for the 2018 season, while still considered members, and Bloomington announced both teams would play independent schedules. As part of the injunction, the Ironmen cannot play any games for as long as the 2018 CIF season lasts.

=== Midwest Professional Indoor Football ===
On March 3, 2018, owner Terrence Williams then posted on social media that he had sold the team to another local group and the Ironmen would be participating in the semi-professional regional Midwest Professional Indoor Football (MPIF) for the 2018 season. The Ironmen went undefeated at 3–0 through the MPIF season with several teams folding during the season. On April 21, 2018, the first-seed Ironmen beat the second-seed and defending MPIF champion Midway Marauders 68–44 at home to win the MPIF championship.

=== American Arena League ===
Two days after winning the MPIF championship, the Ironmen were accepted to return to the CIF for the 2019 season. Upon the release of the 2019 season schedule, the Ironmen were not listed as members.

On January 18, 2019, the Ironmen posted on social media that it had joined the American Arena League (AAL) for the 2019 season along with the remaining teams from the MPIF as a Midwest Division. The Ironmen won the division title over the Indianapolis Enforcers, the only other team in the division to finish the season, before losing the league semifinal game to the West Virginia Roughriders.

The 2020 season was cancelled due to the onset of the COVID-19 pandemic with no games played by any team in the league. The following season, the team played four games with several cancellations by other Midwest Division teams. The AAL chose not to hold a 2021 championship playoff, but stated each division would have their own champion. The Ironmen planned to hold a division championship game on June 5, 2021, but no opponents committed to playing and the team was named the division champions.

=== Great Lakes Arena Football League ===
For the 2023 season, dissatisfied with the options for regional indoor leagues in the Michigan area and seeking a more stable foundation to allow the team to schedule home games with more advance notice than they had, the Ironmen established their own league, the Great Lakes Arena Football League, which was renamed (presumably for trademark concerns) the Great Lakes Arena Alliance before the start of the 2023 season and Great Lakes Arena Football in 2024. As of 2025, the GLAF is inactive, but the league is still owned and operated by the Ironmen.

=== American Indoor Football (Clark/Montero/Foster) ===
On Christmas Day, December 25, 2024, the Ironmen announced on their social media pages that they were returning to the revamped American Indoor Football starting in 2025. This incarnation largely consists of the Ironmen and two teams, the Cedar Rapids River Kings and Coralville Chaos, whose co-owner Dominic Montero had an acrimonious split with the previous AIF the previous season, a dispute that had led the rest of the league's teams to leave for the National Arena League and Montero to lay stake to the AIF brand for his league.

The Ironmen trounced both Montero-owned teams in the 2025 AIF's first two games, defeating Coralville 75-7 on February 14 and shutting Cedar Rapids out 55–0 eight days later. Then, after playing each team again as well as winning their out of league games, the Ironmen hosted the 2025 AIF Championship Game defeating the Chaos 76-24 to win their third national championship and finished the season with an unblemished 7-0 record. As of 2026, Montero is no longer an owner of the league (he would be fully expelled in late March) as Larry Clark is now joined by new commissioner Terrence Foster with the Ironmen setting the standard for the league. On May 4th, the AIF would declare the Ironmen the 2026 champions due to venue conflict with the Muskegon Lumberjacks and various logistical constraints with the Cedar Rapids Titans. The Ironmen went 5-0 while the Titans went 3-3 on the season. Shortly afterward, head coach Terry Mitchell resigned his position. On May 22nd, Mitchell was named AIF Coach of the Year.

The Ironmen announced its takeover of the AIF following the 2026 season.

== Current roster ==
Source: Team website

West Michigan Ironmen roster
Quarterbacks: 14 Alex Carder; 7 Luke Sallee; Running backs: 9 Davveon Taylor Sr.; Wide receivers: 12 Tyler Bruce; 22 Logan Helton; 4 Tyler Hunt; 17 Leroy Mckay; 3 Toni Sok	Offensive linemen: 67 Marquis Cooper; 75 Almarco Fields; 72 Anthony Younger; Defensive linemen: 99 Khyree Allen; 91 Ryan Armstrong; 6 Hunter Charneski; 44 Efrem Heyward; 52 Howard Johnson; 5 Danny Wheeler	Linebackers: 45 Darean Freeman; 8 Jalon Simpson; Defensive backs: 21 Cedric Brown; 0 Ahmad Butler; 10 Josh Fusco; 1 Jair Nowlin; 2 Diovonald Tomasello; Special teams: 55 Riley King	Reserve lists: Currently vacant; Rookies in italics; updated April 12, 2026; 25 Active, 0 Inactive

== Staff ==
Source: Team website

West Michigan Ironmen staff
Front office: Owner – Mario Flores; President – Mario Flores; General manager – Nate Smith; Director of Player Personnel - Ethan Flores; Director of Game Operations - Payton Flores; Director of Digital Operations and Fan Engagement - Billy D. Mann; Chief Human Resource Officer - Jenn Smith; Equipment Manager - Dan Rewa; Head coaches: Head coach – Nate Smith; Assistant Head Coach - Vacant; Offensive coaches: Offensive coordinator – Vacant; Offensive assistant - Rob Zietman	Defensive coaches: Defensive coordinator – Joe Tanis; Defensive assistant - Damion Greggory; Defensive assistant - Tracy Lewis

== Statistics and records ==
=== Season-by-season results ===
League champions	Conference champions	Division champions	Playoff berth	League leader

Season	League	Conference	Division	Regular season				Postseason results
Season	League	Conference	Division	Finish	Wins	Losses	Ties	Postseason results
2016	AIF		Northern	1st	6	1	0	Won Northern Semifinals (Freedom) 78–37; Won Northern Championship (Steelhawks) 42–35; Lost AIF Championship Game (Lions) 32–74
2017	CIF	Northern		5th	4	8	0	
2018	MPIF			1st	3	0	0	Won Semifinals (Apaches) 73–8; Won MPIF Championship (Marauders) 68–44
2019	AAL		Midwest	1st (Note: The AAL counted all games played by member teams, including games against non-league members, and forfeits in the league standings for the 2019 season.)	7	2	0	Won division final (Enforcers) 71–0; Lost Semifinal (Roughriders) 6–45
2020	AAL			Season cancelled due to COVID-19 pandemic				
2021	AAL		Midwest	1st	8	0	0	No postseason; named Midwest Division Champion
2022	AAL		Northern	1st	6	1		No Championship game; named AAL Midwest Champion
2023	GLAF			1st	6	0		Won Semifinals vs Ohio Blitz 66 - 12 Won GLAF Championship vs Southern Michigan Apex 81-25
2024	GLAF			1st	3	1		No semifinals game Lost GLAF Championship vs Michigan Avengerz 12-30
2025	AIF			1st	7	0	0	AIF Championship vs Coralville Won 76-24
2026	AIF		Northern	1st	6	0	0	No Championship game; declared AIF Champions
Totals					49	10	0	All-time regular season record (2016–2026)
Totals					12	3	—	All-time postseason record (2016–2026)
Totals					62	12	0	All-time regular season and postseason record (2016–2026)

=== Head coach records ===
Note: Statistics are correct through the duration of the 2026 season.

Name	Term	Regular season				Playoffs		Awards
Name	Term	W	L	T	Win%	W	L	Awards
Tyrese Lynk	2016–2018	13	9	0	.565	4	1	Won 2018 MPIF championship
Nate Smith	2019–2023	22	3	0	.889	5	2	2019 AAL Midwest Division Champion 2021 AAL Midwest Division Champion 2021 AAL Coach of the Year 2021 AAL Organization of the Year 2022 Midwest Division Champions 2022 AAL Coach of the Year 2023 GLAF Champion
Terry Mitchell	2024–2026	15	0	0	1.000	2	1	Won 2025 AIF Championship/Won 2026 AIF Coach of the year

== Notable players ==
See Category:West Michigan Ironmen players
