= Carolina Ghostriders =

General information
- Founded: 2005
- Folded: 2006
- Headquartered: Asheville, North Carolina
- Colors: Black, Silver, White & Glow-In-The-Dark

Personnel
- Owner: Robert W. Boyd

Home fields
- Asheville Civic Center (2005-2006)

League / conference affiliations
- American Indoor Football League (2005-2006)

The Carolina Ghostriders were an indoor football team and charter member of the American Indoor Football League.

== History ==
Formed in 2005, they were originally named the Carolina Sharks and played their home games at the Cricket Arena in Charlotte, North Carolina. However, the Sharks folded and were replaced by a traveling team, the AIFL Ghostchasers.

The Ghostchasers were often called the "Greensboro Ghostriders" because they were based in Greensboro, North Carolina, although this was never an official name. They were later renamed the Carolina Ghostriders. The team did very poorly, compiling an 0-10 record in the regular season. Because the league only had six teams, however, every team made the playoffs. In the 2005 playoffs they lost to the Johnstown Riverhawks in the opening round.

On December 28, 2005 the AIFL announced that the team would play in Asheville at the Asheville Civic Center.

At the beginning of the 2006 season, the team was bought up by Robert W. Boyd from Pittsburgh, Pennsylvania. After losing 15 games in a row, the franchise officially broke up four games into the 2006 season.

In 2006, Robert W. Boyd and the Carolina Ghostriders won a judgment against the American Indoor Football League, David Edward Dix, and Bizsellers.com for breach of contract, among other offenses.
