= 2010 Richmond Raiders season =

American indoor football team season

- Owner: Mike & Elizabeth Fraizer
- General manager: Jack Bowman
- Head coach: Mike Siani (resigned on May 5; 2-5 record); Charles Gunnings (interim)
- Home stadium: Richmond Coliseum

Results
- Record: 6-8
- Division place: 5th
- Playoffs: did not qualify

The 2010 Richmond Raiders season was the first season as a professional indoor football franchise and their first in the American Indoor Football Association (AIFA). One of 13 teams competing in the AIFA for the 2010 season.

In July, 2009, the American Indoor Football Association announced that they would be expanding into Richmond, Virginia. After a month-long name-the-team contest, the Richmond franchise announced that it would be nicknamed the Raiders on August 5, 2009.

The Raiders' first game was the 2010 AIFA Kickoff Classic; on January 23, 2010, where they played an exhibition game against the AIFA All-Stars at the Richmond Coliseum.

On May 5, 2010, defensive coordinator Charles Gunnings replaced Mike Siani as the head coach, as Siani resigned.

== Schedule ==
Key: Win Tie Loss Bye

=== Preseason ===
Week	Day	Date	Kickoff	Opponent	Results		Location	Attendance
Week	Day	Date	Kickoff	Opponent	Final Score	Team record	Location	Attendance
	Saturday	January 23	7:00 PM	AIFA All-Stars	49-45	0-0	Richmond Coliseum	4,721

=== Regular season ===
Week	Day	Date	Kickoff	Opponent	Results		Location	Attendance
Week	Day	Date	Kickoff	Opponent	Final Score	Team record	Location	Attendance
1	Saturday	March 13	7:00 PM	Reading Express	L 42-56	0-1	Richmond Coliseum	3,197
2	Saturday	March 20	7:00 PM	New Jersey Revolution	W 51-38	1-1	Richmond Coliseum	3,300
3	Sunday	March 28	4:00 PM	at Baltimore Mariners	L 45-49	1-2	1st Mariner Arena	
4	Saturday	April 3	7:00 PM	Fayetteville Guard	W 55-39	2-2	Richmond Coliseum	
5	Saturday	April 10		at Reading Express	L 46-49	2-3	Sovereign Center	2,878
6	Friday	April 16		at Erie Storm	L 35-44	2-4	Louis J. Tullio Arena	3,000
7	Bye							
8	Friday	April 30	7:00 PM	Erie Storm	L 39-53	2-5	Richmond Coliseum	2,562
9	Saturday	May 8	7:00 PM	Fayetteville Guard	W 55-28	3-5	Richmond Coliseum	
10	Friday	May 14		at Reading Express	W 40-39	4-5	Sovereign Center	3,770
11	Saturday	May 22		at New Jersey Revolution	W 76-40	5-5	Mennen Arena	
12	Saturday	May 29	7:00 PM	Baltimore Mariners	L 39-57	5-6	Richmond Coliseum	
13	Saturday	June 5		at Harrisburg Stampede	L 68-74 (3OT)	5-7	Pennsylvania Farm Show Complex & Expo Center	1,856
14	Bye							
15	Saturday	June 19	7:00 pm	Harrisburg Stampede	L 32-46	5-8	Richmond Coliseum	
16	Saturday	June 26		at Fayetteville Guard	W 56-33	6-8	Cumberland County Crown Coliseum	

== Roster ==
2010 Richmond Raiders roster
Quarterbacks: -- Mike Jenkins; -- Robbie Jenkins; Running backs: 33 Wilmont Perry; Wide receivers: -- Jackson; 5 Herb Jones; -- Chris Schubert	Offensive linemen: currently vacant; Defensive linemen: currently vacant	Linebackers: -- Jerrett Brown; 11 Vince Hall; Defensive backs: -- Maurice Thorne; Kickers: currently vacant	Injured Reserve: currently vacant; Exempt List: currently vacant; [Roster] updated June 26, 2010; 2 Active, 0 Inactive → More rosters

== Division Standings ==
Team	Overall			Division		
Team	Wins	Losses	Percentage	Wins	Losses	Percentage
Eastern Division
Baltimore Mariners	14	0	1.000	14	0	1.000
Harrisburg Stampede	11	3	0.786	11	3	0.786
Erie Storm	8	6	0.571	8	6	0.571
Reading Express	8	6	0.571	8	6	0.571
Richmond Raiders	6	8	0.429	6	8	0.429
Fayetteville Guard	2	12	0.143	2	12	0.143
New Jersey Revolution	0	14	0.000	0	14	0.000
Western Division
Wyoming Cavalry	13	1	0.989	13	1	0.989
San Jose Wolves	9	5	0.643	9	5	0.643
Wenatchee Valley Venom	8	6	0.571	8	6	0.571
Yakima Valley Warriors	7	7	0.500	7	7	0.500
Arctic Predators	4	10	0.286	4	10	0.286
Ogden Knights	1	13	0.071	1	13	0.071

- Green indicates clinched playoff berth
- Purple indicates division champion
- Grey indicates best league record
