= 2010 Erie Storm season =

American indoor football team season

- Owner: Bill Stafford
- General manager: Shawn Liotta
- Head coach: Shawn Liotta
- Home stadium: Louis J. Tullio Arena

Results
- Record: 8-6
- Division place: 3rd
- Playoffs: Lost EC Round 1

The 2010 Erie Storm season was the 4th season for the American Indoor Football Association franchise.

On September 8, 2009 the RiverRats announced that Liotta would return to Erie as the head coach for the 2010 season. In December, it was announced that owner Jeff Hauser had sold a stake in the franchise to a local group that included Jeff Plyler (owner of Plyler Overhead Door of McKean, PA) and Bill Stafford (owner of several Subway restaurant locations in Erie), among others. The team remained in the AIFA, and the team adopted the corporate name "Erie Professional Football, Inc." in December 2009, in anticipation of a new franchise name to be announced in January 2010.

Hauser maintained a smaller stake in the team, which immediately dropped the RiverRats name. On January 5, 2010, the team announced the four finalists of the name-the-team contest; Storm, Blizzard, Pulse, and Punishers. On January 14, 2010 the team was officially named the Erie Storm via a press conference, in which the team logo and colors were also released.

Aided by Dinkins's return, the briefly rechristened Storm rebounded to an 8-6 season in 2010, before losing to the Harrisburg Stampede in the playoffs. Dinkins retired at the end of the season.

On May 5, 2010, Lake Erie College based in Painesville, Ohio asked a court judge to order the Erie Storm not use the Erie Storm name due to similarities with their own name the Lake Erie College whose athletic nickname is the Storm. In July 2010, the name "Storm" was dropped, and the team began functioning under the name "Erie Professional Football," which remains the name of the team's corporate entity.

== Schedule ==
=== Regular season ===
Date	Opponent	Home/Away	Result
March 7	Reading Express	Home	Won 41-28
March 14	Harrisburg Stampede	Home	Lost 34-41
March 27	Reading Express	Away	Lost 51-53
April 3	Harrisburg Stampede	Away	Lost 19-58
April 16	Richmond Raiders	Home	Won 44-35
April 25	Reading Express	Home	Won 41-34
April 30	Richmond Raiders	Away	Won 53-39
May 8	Harrisburg Stampede	Away	Lost 35-54
May 14	New Jersey Revolution	Home	Won 40-38
May 22	Fayetteville Guard	Home	Won 55-52
May 29	New Jersey Revolution	Away	Won 68-58
June 5	Baltimore Mariners	Away	Lost 51-34
June 13	Baltimore Mariners	Home	Lost 39-37
June 19	Fayetteville Guard	Away	Won 65-58

=== Standings ===
Team	Overall			Division		
Team	Wins	Losses	Percentage	Wins	Losses	Percentage
Eastern Division
Baltimore Mariners	14	0	1.000	14	0	1.000
Harrisburg Stampede	11	3	0.786	11	3	0.786
Erie Storm	8	6	0.571	8	6	0.571
Reading Express	8	6	0.571	8	6	0.571
Richmond Raiders	6	8	0.429	6	8	0.429
Fayetteville Guard	2	12	0.143	2	12	0.143
New Jersey Revolution	0	14	0.000	0	14	0.000
Western Division
Wyoming Cavalry	13	1	0.989	13	1	0.989
San Jose Wolves	9	5	0.643	9	5	0.643
Wenatchee Valley Venom	8	6	0.571	8	6	0.571
Yakima Valley Warriors	7	7	0.500	7	7	0.500
Arctic Predators	4	10	0.286	4	10	0.286
Ogden Knights	1	13	0.071	1	13	0.071

- Green indicates clinched playoff berth
- Purple indicates division champion
- Grey indicates best league record
