= 2015 Erie Explosion season =

- Owner: Bill Stafford
- General manager: Shawn Liotta
- Head coach: Shawn Liotta
- Home stadium: Erie Insurance Arena

Results
- Record: 2-9
- League place: 7th
- Playoffs: did not qualify

The 2015 Erie Explosion season was the ninth and final season for the indoor football franchise, and their only season in the Professional Indoor Football League (PIFL).

== Schedule ==
Key: Win Tie Loss Bye

=== Regular season ===
All start times are local to home team

Week	Day	Date	Kickoff	Opponent	Results		Location
Week	Day	Date	Kickoff	Opponent	Score	Record	Location
1	BYE						
2	Sunday	March 29	2:00pm	Lehigh Valley Steelhawks	L 43-50	0-1	Erie Insurance Arena
3	BYE						
4	Saturday	April 11	7:00pm	at Trenton Freedom	L 23-75	0-2	Sun National Bank Center
5	Saturday	April 18	7:00pm	at Lehigh Valley Steelhawks	L 33-59	0-3	PPL Center
6	Saturday	April 25	7:00pm	ASI Panthers (interleague)	W 50-26	1-3	Erie Insurance Arena
7	Sunday	May 3	2:00pm	Nashville Venom	L 35-63	1-4	Erie Insurance Arena
8	Sunday	May 10	2:00pm	Richmond Raiders	W 46-70	1-5	Erie Insurance Arena
9	Saturday	May 16	7:00pm	Trenton Freedom	L 47-50	1-6	Erie Insurance Arena
10	BYE						
11	Saturday	May 30	7:00pm	at Columbus Lions	L 26-81	1-7	Columbus Civic Center
12	Saturday	June 6	7:00pm	Alabama Hammers	W 55-52	2-7	Erie Insurance Arena
13	Friday	June 12	8:00pm	at Nashville Venom	L 38-61	2-8	Nashville Municipal Auditorium
14	Saturday	June 20	7:00pm	at Richmond Raiders	L 8-77	2-9	Richmond Coliseum

=== Standings ===
2015 Professional Indoor Football League
Team	W	L	T	PCT	PF	PA	PF (Avg.)	PA (Avg.)	STK
y-Columbus Lions	8	3	0	.727	611	509	55.5	46.3	L1
y-Richmond Raiders	8	4	0	.667	649	507	54.1	42.3	W6
x-Nashville Venom	7	4	0	.636	574	467	52.2	42.5	W2
x-Lehigh Valley Steelhawks	6	5	0	.545	515	460	46.8	41.8	L3
Trenton Freedom	6	6	0	.500	553	517	46.1	43.1	L2
Alabama Hammers	5	7	0	.417	555	645	46.3	53.7	W2
Erie Explosion	2	9	0	.182	404	664	36.7	60.4	L2

== Roster ==
2015 Erie Explosion roster
Quarterbacks: 10 Steffen Colon; 4 Mason Espinosa; Running backs: 99 Bob Hammer; 13 Richard Stokes; Wide receivers: 1 Alex Coleman; 5 Alfonso Hoggard; 8 Terry Jackson; 6 Raymond Mack; 3 C. J. Tarver; -- Evan Twombly	Offensive linemen: 78 Henry Conway; 52 Byron Dovales; 75 Jeremiah Fennell; 78 Oscar Gonzalez; 50 Tyler Worthley; Defensive linemen: -- Serge Augustin; 2 Tim Green; 11 DaJuan Smith; -- Zach Williams	Linebackers: 31 Maurice Gibbs; Defensive backs: 7 Brian Darden; 21 Aunre' Davis; 9 Johnnie Taylor; 20 DeQwan Young; Kickers: -- Michael Georgetti; 14 Shon Rowser	Injured Reserve: 12 Greg Betterson WR (IR); -- Marcus Fowler OL (IR); 31 Marcus Green LB (IR); 75 LaRoi Johnson OL (IR); 43 Phil Lewis DL (IR); 1 Jayson Nickson DB (IR); 3 Jeff Sinclair QB (IR); Exempt List: 17 Maurice Williams WR (Exempt); Failure to report: -- Dana Brown DL (DNR); -- Andrew Mathis DL (DNR); -- Brandon McElwee LB (DNR); rookies in italics Roster updated June 14, 2015; 28 Active, 11 Inactive → More rosters
