= Running up the score =

Sports strategy

The Erie Explosion, earning 138 points in a shutout win against the Fayetteville Force, ran up the score to set a modern professional indoor football record in 2011.

Running up the score (or "piling on") is a sports strategy that occurs when a winning team continues to play in such a way as to score additional points after the outcome of the game is beyond doubt.

Alternatives might include pulling out most of the team's first-string players, or calling plays designed to run out the clock (e.g., in American football, kneeling or running the ball up the middle). Mercy rules are used in some amateur sports, which end the game when the score differential reaches a certain point.

In professional sports in the United States, running up the score has generally been considered controversial and has been subject to debate. In team sports in many other parts of the world, it is normal and indeed expected that professional athletes will continue to attempt to score points for as long as they have the opportunity to do so.

Those who oppose the strategy note that running up the score may be considered poor sportsmanship by fans, players, and coaches, but there have been different opinions of how big an insult running up the score is. Allegations of poor sportsmanship are also often brought up in the United States soon after a team scores multiple times near the end of a one-sided match. Running up the score can also cause injuries to a game's starting players, can lead to less game experience for non-starting and lower caliber players on the team (in cases where starters are left in a game well after the outcome is certain), and can motivate future opponents to run up the score. Players on the losing side may also end up feeling disrespected and may decide to vent their frustration through violent or unsporting play, which can lead to injuries and fights, and even potential post-game punishment such as fines or suspension from future play.

Those who favor running up the score in the United States argue there are potential benefits, such as catering to polls (when they are used to determine team rankings), getting additional experience for players, or preventing potential comebacks. In many sports, teams are incentivized to run up the score, owing to the use of goal difference (or equivalents such as net run rate) as a tiebreaker in competitions; in this case there may be less of a stigma around large score differentials.

== Justifications ==
=== Benefits in the BCS and other polls ===
Some sports (especially American College sports) have used polls for determining team rankings, matches, and championships. Certain coaches are notorious for running up the score to impress coaches and sportswriters who vote in the Amway Coaches Poll or AP Poll. It is a common allegation that some poll voters simply look at box scores before punching in their votes. When the Bowl Championship Series (BCS) existed in college football, the votes had a huge impact on who went to BCS games, including the national championship. Only by watching the game or game tape (or by careful box-score scrutiny) can a coach determine if a 49–21 score was caused by a fairly one-sided game or the winning team trying to make the score look more impressive when the game's outcome was certain. The BCS computers originally included margin of victory as a component, but the BCS removed that element after noticing large increases in teams running up the score.

From the 2014 season, the BCS was replaced by the College Football Playoff (CFP). Polls do not play a role in determining CFP participants; instead, these teams are chosen by a selection committee similar to that used in the NCAA basketball tournament selection process.

=== Practice ===
Some fans of teams whose coaches frequently run up the score may also note that running up the score has its advantages. Though many coaches who run up the score do it with only their first-string players, a coach who uses his third- and fourth-string players can give them vital in-game experience if he allows them to do more than, in American football, just kneel on the football or run the ball up the middle. When they are not allowed to make passing and running plays that the first- and second-stringers get to make, their skills may not develop as quickly.

Alternatively, in college sports with many players from successful teams having hopes of becoming professionals, running up the score gives players the chance to improve their statistics and to show off skills that the conventional offense would not allow. While it may be seen as poor sportsmanship, as there is no guarantee that any player will be picked for the professional leagues, every opportunity to bolster stats and impress scouts can be seen as improving the professional prospects of the players.

=== Gameplay ===
It is also argued that it can be used as a preventive measure to prevent a huge comeback. In 2006, Penn State lost to Notre Dame 41–17. Notre Dame justified running up the score because Penn State was known for late comebacks. Supporters of preventively running up the score will often point to games such as the 2006 Insight Bowl where Minnesota blew a 38–7 lead in the third quarter, to eventually lose 44–41 to Texas Tech.

=== Improving tiebreaker qualification chances ===
In addition, many leagues use tiebreakers if two or more teams are tied in the standings; one common tiebreaker when multiple teams are involved (such as when three teams are tied, with no team having beaten both of the others) is "point differential" (calculated as the difference between the number of points a team scores vs. the number of points a team allows against common opponents) or variations thereof, such as cricket's net run rate; "running up a score" can help their chances of winning positions and stop the other team from scoring as well (though some leagues counter that by placing a cap on the number of points which can be counted in a point differential, such as no more than 14; then, even if the score is 49–0, only 14 points will count in the tiebreaker).

=== Other justifications ===
An argument frequently used in favor of running up the score is the belief that it is not the coach's or winning team's fault if a weak team is unable to stop a high-powered offensive juggernaut. Florida State coach Bobby Bowden contended that it was not his job to call plays that are inconsistent with his regular offense. He felt that the prevention of further scoring was the responsibility of the opposing team's defense. Also, some coaches advocate running up the score to make another point, such as showing disapproval of comments made by opposing players, coaches, etc., in the media.

Running up the score in professional leagues generally creates significantly less controversy and indeed the term is far less common. While there are numerous reasons to run out the clock, there is no reason not to score more points if the situation allows. As all teams are professionals, even perceived underdogs have the potential to score points quickly if they are given the chance. Even teams with a dominant lead have a strong interest in maintaining possession to run down the clock, which often puts them in the position to score more points.

At all levels of play, it is generally accepted that players or teams close to breaking significant records can run up the score without it being seen as overtly disrespectful. In fact, many offensive records almost require running up the score to be in contention as a result of records set in eras in which leagues were less balanced, seasons were of a different length, or rules were substantially different.

In one instance that did not involve the score, but where a long-established record could have easily been broken, a coach was praised for his sportsmanship. In 1999, during a 44–28 victory over the Cleveland Browns, Cincinnati Bengals coach Bruce Coslet took running back Corey Dillon out of the game early in the fourth quarter. By that point, he had gained 246 yards and, had he continued playing, almost certainly would have broken Walter Payton's single-game rushing record of 275 yards. After the game, Coslet explained that since Payton, who had died the month before, had set the record in a game his team won 10–7, he did not feel it right for Dillon to break it in a game that, by the point he took the player out, became one-sided.

== In American football ==
=== College football ===
==== Florida ====
In 1995, with a 38–17 lead going into the fourth quarter over Georgia, Florida head coach Steve Spurrier decided to run up the score to "hang half a hundred" on the scoreboard to humiliate their opponents on their home field, something that had never been done before. His team succeeded with a final score of 52–17. That record still stands as the most points ever scored by an opposing team at Sanford Stadium.

==== Georgia Tech ====
On October 7, 1916, Georgia Tech defeated the Cumberland College Bulldogs 222–0. Cumberland had previously disbanded their football team, but quickly formed a scrub team when faced with fines if they refused to play. Georgia Tech scored 63 points in the first quarter and 63 points in the second quarter, then 54 points in the third quarter and 42 points in the fourth. Cumberland did not record a first down during the game. Georgia Tech won under the coaching of John Heisman, who wanted revenge after an embarrassing 22–0 loss earlier that year to a Cumberland baseball team that he suspected of having used professional players posing as students.

==== Houston ====
On November 23, 1968, the University of Houston defeated the University of Tulsa 100–6. Though they had a 24–0 advantage at halftime, Houston scored 11 touchdowns in the second half – including 7 in the fourth quarter – for an astounding 94-point blowout.

They came close again in 1989, routing a Southern Methodist (SMU) team fresh off the so-called death penalty in by a score of 95–21 in what could be termed as a "revenge game" after years of humiliation against its longtime Southwestern Conference rival; Houston itself was under their bowl and television ban that season as it also was being punished for past recruiting violations, meaning only those in attendance at the Astrodome witnessed the Cougars embarrass the Mustangs.

In 1990, Houston defeated Division I-AA opponent Eastern Washington University 84–21 and kept QB David Klingler playing late in the game to allow him to set NCAA records for most TD passes in a single game and a single season. Klingler threw 11 TD passes in that game, with 5 in the second half – including 2 in the fourth quarter. His final touchdown pass gave Houston a 77–14 lead with their starting QB still in the game. The next year, 1991, they would blow out Louisiana Tech University 73–3 in the opening game of the season.

==== Miami ====
On November 30, 1985, the University of Miami Hurricanes were playing the Fighting Irish of Notre Dame in Gerry Faust's final game as Notre Dame head coach. The Hurricanes, led by Jimmy Johnson, were trying to impress pollsters since they were ranked fourth in the polls prior to the game. The Hurricanes called a fake punt on fourth-and-11 in the fourth quarter with a 44–7 lead, scored a touchdown off a blocked punt with less than six minutes left, and went on to win 58–7. Miami was rewarded in the AP poll as it passed idle Iowa to reach No. 3 and set up a possible national championship with a victory over Tennessee in the Sugar Bowl. Receiving criticism after the game, Johnson replied, "Nobody apologized to me when Oklahoma did it", a reference to a 1980 rout by the score of 63–14 when Johnson was head coach at Oklahoma State University. Miami would go on to lose to Tennessee, 35–7, in the 1986 Sugar Bowl.

==== Notre Dame ====
Notre Dame defeated Georgia Tech 69–14 in 1977. The Fighting Irish led 21–7 at halftime but scored 21 points in the third quarter and 27 in the fourth. Only a missed extra point after ND's eighth touchdown kept the Irish from scoring 70 points for the first time since 1932 and only the second time in Notre Dame Stadium history. After ND took a 62–7 lead, Georgia Tech scored its only second half points on a kickoff return for a touchdown by Eddie Lee Ivery; the Irish would not surrender another kickoff return for a touchdown until 21 years later, against Kevin Faulk and LSU in 1998. The blowout was payback for a 23–14 upset victory by Georgia Tech over Notre Dame in 1976, after which Yellow Jacket players were quoted as deriding the Fighting Irish as fat and slow. There also was bad blood between ND coach Dan Devine and GT coach Pepper Rodgers, dating back to the days when they coached arch-rivals Missouri and Kansas, respectively; Devine's Tigers had defeated Rodgers's Jayhawks 69–21 in the 1969 season finale in Lawrence. The 1977 humiliation of Georgia Tech did not impact Notre Dame's poll standing; they remained No. 5 in the AP poll—but the Fighting Irish won the rest of their games to finish 11–1 and win the 1977 national championship.

Notre Dame defeated Boston College 54–7 in a 1992 game where Fighting Irish coach Lou Holtz called a fake punt on the first series of the third quarter, with his team already possessing an enormous (albeit not technically insurmountable) 37–0 lead. A year later, Boston College would upset Notre Dame 41–39 in the final regular season game of the year, knocking the Fighting Irish from 1st to 4th in the AP poll and paving the way for Florida State to be voted national champions.

While playing at longtime rival Stanford in 2003, Notre Dame head coach Tyrone Willingham allowed his punter to call a fake punt in response to a punt block read while the Fighting Irish led 57–7 late in the fourth quarter. Willingham was formerly head coach at Stanford.

==== Ohio State ====
In 1968, the Ohio State Buckeyes, en route to a national championship, defeated their bitter rival, the Michigan Wolverines, 50–14. Late in the game, Ohio State held a commanding 44–14 advantage and scored one final touchdown. Rather than taking the more common extra point kick, Ohio State head coach Woody Hayes opted for a two-point conversion, which was unsuccessful. When asked later why he went for two points, Hayes said, "Because I couldn't go for three!", though players have commented that there was some sort of confusion on the extra point kick, and Hayes was just covering for his players. The following season, the heavily favored Buckeyes fell to the Wolverines, with Bo Schembechler using the 50–14 blowout as a motivation.

Head coach Urban Meyer's 2014 Ohio State team defeated Wisconsin 59–0 in the Big Ten championship game. Meyer later said that he intentionally ran up the score against Wisconsin to help his team be chosen for the College Football Playoff, which they eventually won the National Championship.

==== Oklahoma ====
On November 8, 2003, the Oklahoma Sooners showed little mercy against the Texas A&M Aggies, cruising to a 49–0 halftime lead. Oklahoma head coach Bob Stoops denied running up the score as his second string players came out in the 3rd quarter and put up 28 more points to finish with a final score of 77–0 and 639 yards of total offense. This was the worst loss in Texas A&M football history. In Stoops' defense, the coaches agreed to a running clock during most of the second half and the entire 4th quarter. Also, at one point in the fourth quarter, Oklahoma had first and goal inside the A&M 5-yard line with a chance to score over 80 points, but Stoops called four consecutive runs up the middle to prevent another score.

==== Oklahoma State ====
In their 2012 season opener, the Oklahoma State Cowboys defeated the Savannah State Tigers 84–0. In defense of the lop-sided result, interim defense coordinator Glenn Spencer claimed the shutout was a tribute to the team's full-time defensive coordinator Bill Young, who had recently undergone an undisclosed medical procedure. It ended up as the most lopsided victory for OSU since a 117–0 rout of Southwestern Oklahoma in 1916 and Savannah State's worst loss since a 98–0 defeat against Bethune-Cookman in 1953, a season when the Tigers were outscored 444–6.

==== Penn State ====
Although longtime Penn State head coach Joe Paterno was regarded by some as one who did everything he could to avoid running up the score, such as in a 63–10 win over Illinois in 2005 where Penn State held a 56–3 halftime lead, Pitt partisan journalist Beano Cook claimed he made an exception in 1985 against hated rival Pitt. The game was well in hand with the score 31–0 when the assistants called the first string team off the field. Paterno supposedly immediately ordered them back in, saying, "I want to bury Pitt." Paterno's 1991 Penn State team is often accused of running it up on Cincinnati 81–0, but this was refuted by the Bearcats' coach Tim Murphy, who said "I think Joe's a class guy and I don't believe he'd do that in a hundred years," Murphy said. "We made too many mistakes even for a first game of the season and that's my fault. I'm embarrassed, not Joe Paterno."

==== Stanford ====
In the early 2000s, Stanford was considered the bottom-dweller of the Pac-10, whereas in-state rival USC was named the "Team of the Decade" by both CBSSports.com and Football.com, as well as the "Program of the Decade" by SI.com. However, after the arrival of head coach Jim Harbaugh to The Farm in 2007 and Stanford's record-breaking upset of the Trojans that fall, the Stanford-USC rivalry began to pick up in intensity and importance. During their 2009 meeting, Stanford was crushing USC in the Coliseum, leading 42–21 midway through the fourth quarter. After a touchdown run by future Heisman Trophy runner-up Toby Gerhart to bring the score to 48–21, Harbaugh kept the Cardinal offense on the field to attempt a two-point conversion. When asked what was going on, Harbaugh said, "I want to put fifty on these motherfuckers." The two-point conversion was unsuccessful, but Stanford would later score in the final minutes of the game, and ultimately won 55–21 after scoring 27 points in the fourth quarter. It was the worst home loss in USC history at the time, and is USC's largest margin of defeat in the Stanford-USC rivalry.

After the game, USC head coach Pete Carroll approached Harbaugh and, visibly angry, asked "What's your deal? You alright?" To which Harbaugh retorted "I'm fine. What's your deal?" This moment (in addition to the aforementioned Stanford upset of #1 USC in 2007) is seen by many as the turning point of the Stanford Cardinal football program, which, for the next eight years, was one of the most successful programs in college football.

==== Texas A&M ====
During the same 2003 season in which Oklahoma defeated Texas A&M 77–0, Texas A&M ran up the score themselves in a 73–10 home rout of Baylor University. As a result, A&M entered the rematch the following year as heavy favorites, with the game scheduled the week before their highly anticipated showdown against Oklahoma. Perhaps looking ahead to their anticipated revenge against the Sooners, Texas A&M instead fell to the very Baylor team they had humiliated the previous season. With the Bears managing only three wins during the 2004 campaign, their 35–34 overtime victory stood out as one of the year’s biggest upsets. Texas A&M went on to lose to Oklahoma again the next week, this time by a narrower 42–35 margin.

==== Washington and Oregon ====
The largest margin of victory turnaround in Division I-A football in successive years belongs to the University of Washington and the University of Oregon and showcased two prime examples of running up the score. In 1973, Oregon ran up the score at home, burying Washington 58–0. A year later, Washington responded with a 66–0 drubbing of Oregon back home in Seattle. In that game, Washington's starting quarterback Chris Rowland played longer than necessary and suffered a season-ending knee injury. Rowland recalled that Washington head coach Jim Owens "wanted me in and said, 'We're going to beat these guys more than they beat us.' He [Owens] apologized to me because it was a personal thing for him."

==== BYU and Utah ====
The BYU-Utah football rivalry's history is replete with lopsided games on both sides. During the early days of the BYU football program, the Cougars would frequently be blown away by physically superior Utah teams. At one point, between the years of 1931–37, Utah outscored BYU by a combined score of 200–6. The tide changed with BYU's hiring of LaVell Edwards, who brought the program credibility (and a national championship in 1984). During the Edwards years, the Cougars were regularly accused of running the score up mercilessly against the Utes. Years where this was particularly true included 1977 (38–8), 1980 (56–6), 1981 (56–28), 1983 (55–7), and 1989 (70–31). Normally, this practice was orchestrated by Edwards' assistants, such as touchdown-happy offensive coordinator Doug Scovil. Perhaps the most infamous example of Scovil's tendency toward scoring at all times was the 1977 match-up between the two teams. BYU quarterback Marc Wilson was in the midst of a spectacular sophomore season, and Utah was struggling defensively. During the fourth quarter, having already passed for 555 yards and four scores, Wilson was benched with his team leading 31–8. However, a member of the stadium press contingent recognized that Wilson had left the game just six yards shy of the NCAA single-game passing record. Scovil was informed, and promptly sent Wilson back into the game; the quarterback promptly threw an eight-yard pass that gave him the record. Scovil indicated for him to remain in the game, and he subsequently threw a fifth touchdown pass, giving BYU a 38–8 victory. Utah head coach Wayne Howard was enraged, and that incident helped fuel the venom of the rivalry moving forward. BYU has rarely beaten Utah since Edwards' departure, although the most recent (2021) match-up of the two teams saw BYU winning 26-17 and costing Utah its national ranking.

=== Professional football ===
Running up the score is rarely done by teams in the National Football League (NFL) and other professional American football leagues. A primary reason is that starting players and coaches are paid hundreds of thousands to millions of dollars each year, which is affected by how the players and the team performs during the season. Any attempt to run up the score increases the risks of losing a key player to an injury that could affect the team's chances for the rest of the season. Thus, if a team decides to keep their stars in during a blowout, it is usually viewed by the opponent as an insult. Another factor is that the parity that the salary cap has brought to the NFL in the 1990s has evened out competition somewhat, with less talent disparity between the best and worst teams compared to the past. It is much more difficult to run up the score to embarrassing (50+ point) margins in the modern game at the pro level. The greatest margin of victory at the professional level happened in the 1940 NFL Championship Game won by the Chicago Bears over the Washington Redskins 73–0. In 1976, the Los Angeles Rams defeated the Atlanta Falcons 59–0, a margin which was matched in 2009 when the New England Patriots defeated the Tennessee Titans in the New England snow. Most recently, the New Orleans Saints defeated the Indianapolis Colts 62–7 on October 23, 2011; the Seattle Seahawks defeated the Arizona Cardinals 58–0 on December 9, 2012; and the Miami Dolphins defeated the Denver Broncos 70–20 on September 24, 2023. In the latter game, the Dolphins were in field goal range late in the fourth quarter, but declined to run up the score any further by taking a knee on fourth down.

The one exception to this general rule is in regards to the NFL's tiebreaking rules that are used to determine which teams qualify for the playoffs if they are tied in the standings. One criterion to break ties is comparing the total number of points scored by each team during the regular season. Under this scenario, running up the score in a late season game is not considered poor sportsmanship because there is a benefit to having the score higher. This scenario almost occurred during the 1999 season when the Green Bay Packers could possibly have made the playoffs if the Dallas Cowboys had lost and they had scored enough points against the division rival Cardinals, in their final regular season game to surpass the Carolina Panthers in total points scored. They ended up beating the Cardinals 49–24, but Dallas went on to beat the Giants later that day to earn the final playoff spot and knock the Packers out of the playoff picture anyway.

Accusations of running up the score are unusual in the NFL (except in playoff races), but not unheard of. One of the most notorious occurred on November 17, 1985, when the New York Jets defeated the Tampa Bay Buccaneers 62–28 in a regular season game. The two teams had last met in the final game of the previous season, when Tampa Bay had somewhat controversially appeared to stop playing defense and allowing the Jets to score late in a 41–21 victory in an apparent effort to get the ball back so that running back James Wilder Sr. could attempt to break the NFL record for most yards from scrimmage in a season. Commentators wondered if the Jets' huge margin of victory was a way of retaliating against the Bucs for such poor sportsmanship, but the Jets and their coaches denied that there had been any conscious effort to run the score up. The Jets' denials may be valid since Bucs coach John McKay, who allowed the Jets to score late in the 1984 contest, retired after the '84 season and had been replaced by Leeman Bennett, and also the Jets were 11–5 in 1985 and reached the playoffs, while Tampa Bay was in the midst of back-to-back 2–14 seasons in 1985 and '86.

A game in 1996 between the Packers and Cowboys ended in a 21–6 Cowboys victory and some complaints by Green Bay players that the home team's final field goal was an insult to them, as Dallas had the ball deep in Green Bay territory with the game well in hand as it ended, yet chose to score more points anyway. However, the final field goal was not an attempt at embarrassment, but at a record – Cowboys coach Barry Switzer wanted to give kicker Chris Boniol a chance to tie the then-NFL record for most field goals in a game (seven). Similarly, during the 2011 Saints' 62–7 victory, while the margin of victory was very large and the game was almost beyond doubt at halftime, Drew Brees had thrown below his average number of yards. Keeping him and the first offense playing contributed towards his breaking of the single season all time passing record later in the year, and edging out Tom Brady who also broke the old record that season. While it may be considered derisive to the opponents for coaches to push for records, they are a mark in history for the players and the coaches and it is generally accepted among critics that chasing records is not bad sportsmanship or running up the score per se.

While some teams who regularly score very large number of points are occasionally criticized for running up the score, it is debatable at exactly what point scoring additional points becomes running up the score. Given recent comebacks such as The Miracle at the New Meadowlands and Super Bowl LI, and how quickly points can be accumulated (through interception returns, onside kicks and kick returns), it is understandable that coaches are cautious about becoming overconfident in their offenses and they normally prefer to run out the clock rather than risk an unlikely but certainly possible comeback late in the game, particularly for teams who have a strong offense but a weaker defense.

During the 2011 season, the three teams with the best offenses (New England, Green Bay and New Orleans) also had the worst defenses, which explains why none of those teams were happy to run out the clock, instead always pressuring for points. The current salary cap rules mean that it is nearly impossible for a team to have an excellent offense and defense over any period of time, particularly as cheaper players who play very well one year will likely cost more in the next year. Such tactics are generally referred to as 'Keeping their foot on the gas', and is generally not frowned upon in the NFL.

The most egregious known case of running up the score in professional football is believed to have taken place in 1904, when the Massillon Tigers, in the pre-forward pass era, racked up 26 touchdowns and 18 extra points to amass a score of 148–0 against a team from Marion, Ohio. (Touchdowns only counted five points in this era.) A similar rout had occurred in 1903 when the Watertown Red & Black obliterated an opponent from Cortland, New York by a score of 142–0. Under then-current rules, the team that had scored received the kickoff instead of kicking it as it is today; however, it was much easier and more common to perform onside kicks in this era, and as far as it's known, neither Marion nor Cortland attempted one. As such, neither team ever touched the ball after receiving the opening possession. The third-highest total in professional football history is much more recent, and happened in an indoor football game, where scores tend to be much higher than in the traditional outdoor game. In 2011, the Erie Explosion indoor football team racked up 138 points in a shutout victory over the Fayetteville Force. Having blown out the Force 42–0 in the first quarter alone thanks to three Force pick-sixes (including one achieved by a lateral), the Explosion continued to pile on, offering free tickets if the Explosion hit 100 points; when the players and head coach Shawn Liotta were told that the indoor record was 133 points (they were not informed of the overall pro record), they decided to attempt to break it, a feat they succeeded in achieving.

There is one definite instance of running up the score in NFL History. In 1987, during the NFL strike, the Dallas Cowboys had many starters cross the picket line such as Hall of Famers Randy White and Tony Dorsett, and starting QB Danny White. The Cowboys destroyed the Eagles 41–22 in one of the three strike games played in the 1987 season. To get back at the Cowboys, when the teams faced off again later in the season, Coach Buddy Ryan called a passing play on 3rd down with 1:00 left to play in the game after taking a knee on first and second down, even though the Eagles had the game won at 30–20. The pass was incomplete but was called for pass interference, moving the Eagles to the 1 yard line, where the foul was called. The Eagles then proceeded to score another touchdown and finish the game 37–20. Because both teams finished 7–8 and failed to make the playoffs that season, this moment is not remembered as much as the 1987 Replacement game between the Washington Redskins and the Dallas Cowboys. This moment was also overshadowed by the future success of the Eagles, the Cowboys' failures in the late 1980s, and Buddy Ryan's heavily publicized feud against his former coach Mike Ditka.

== In other sports ==
=== Basketball ===
In basketball, some coaches of vastly superior teams will keep in their starters in the latter stages of a grossly one-sided game (e.g., less than ten minutes left in the second half of a college game; or well into the fourth quarter of a high school or NBA game). Players may be told to continue to aggressively apply full-court pressure (in order to steal the ball), block shots, break away for slam dunks, or try three-point baskets and other fan-pleasing shots.

A team that is trailing by an undefined margin sometimes may prolong the game by fouling the opponent on every possession, in an effort to extend its chances of a comeback — although teams that utilize this strategy often do so only when the game is still somewhat competitive. However, this strategy does not always work, particularly if the fouled players or team is able to connect on free throws.

In cases where the score is lopsided much earlier in the game, the most common option is to just "play it out" as if it were a scrimmage, by trying to take the best shot possible and also attempt some sort of defense (without any taboos against fan-pleasing shots and plays). This is usually referred to as "garbage time", and while generally frowned upon for a lack of excitement it is considered to be the best way of ending a thoroughly uncompetitive game with minimal amounts of pride lost by the weaker side.

Running up the score was a key element in the Knicks–Nuggets brawl on December 16, 2006, as New York coach Isiah Thomas accused Denver coach George Karl of implementing it late in the game. Karl defended himself by citing many games where his team had lost large leads late.

Former Oklahoma Sooners basketball coach Billy Tubbs was often accused of running up the score against inferior opponents. On November 29, 1989, Tubbs' team went so far as to score 97 points in the first half of a game against U.S. International. Oklahoma won the game in a 173–101 rout. Asked repeatedly about running up the score against opponents, Tubbs once famously replied, "If they don't like it, they should get better."

Occasionally, teams will run up the score because of crowd encouragement. Crowd encouragement can occur whether or not there is a physical incentive involved. Often, a crowd will start chanting "X more points" near the end of a game, where X is the number of points needed to reach 100. This usually occurs when the team is within 5 points of reaching the 100-point mark. Also, crowd encouragement can happen as the result of a promotion for ticket-holders and the general public. In a Bradley home game against Wichita State, coach Jim Les put in some reserve players during the last 1–2 minutes of the game after the score got to 62–50. During the final possession, the crowd started to yell "Shoot shoot shoot" because the season ticket-holders would get a buy-one-get-one-free rib-eye steak dinner at a local restaurant if the score reached 63. One of the Bradley players launched a buzzer-beating 3 because of the crowd encouragement and it went in, making the final score 65–50. Similarly, during a 2014 game against Southern Virginia, BYU basketball led 98–48 with the clock running down. In response to chants of "Hundred! Hundred!" from the student section, Cougar reserve guard Jake Toolson launched a deep three-pointer as time expired. It was good, making the final score 101–48. Although the BYU fans and bench reacted with delight, Cougar head coach Dave Rose was upset by the incident. Toolson himself was privately reprimanded.

=== Baseball ===
The unwritten rules of baseball discourage a team from sacrifice bunting, stealing bases, or other small ball tactics when leading by a large margin late in a game, even though a losing team can theoretically come back from any deficit to win. Batters do not specifically try to make outs (e.g. by swinging at pitches with no intent to hit them) as this would insult the opposing team, violate the spirit of the game, and hurt their own batting average. The bottom of the ninth inning is not played if the home team leads after the top of the ninth inning, preventing pointless score run-ups when the team's victory is already assured.

In a 2021 game where the visiting Chicago White Sox led the Minnesota Twins 15-4 late in the game, the Twins put in Willians Astudillo, a position utility player who normally would not pitch, on the mound for the last inning, a move traditionally seen under the game's unwritten rules as conceding it, to which batters customarily respond by not trying too hard to get hits so the game will end more quickly and without further humiliation to the losing team. After Astudillo had gotten the first two White Sox batters out, rookie catcher Yermín Mercedes came to the plate for what was expected to be the game's final out. On a 3-0 count, Astudillo threw a 47-mile-per-hour (76 km/h) eephus pitch over the plate. Mercedes swung his bat, itself a violation of the unwritten rules in that situation, and hit a 429-foot (131 m) home run. The Twins were greatly angered, and Sox manager Tony LaRussa promised Mercedes would be advised not to do so in the future.

Amateur, high school, and international baseball games often have a mercy rule so that games end sooner when the lead is deemed to be insurmountable (e.g. by 10 runs after 5 innings). However, since the home team always gets one final at-bat if they are trailing, the visiting team can in theory score unlimited runs in the top half of the inning.

=== Cricket ===
The nature of cricket with teams alternating either one or two innings and how games are limited by time or overs means that running up the score does not exist as a meaningful term within the sport. Teams seek to score the largest amount of runs within their specified time frame or before their wickets are taken by the opposition, as long as the time taken to acquire the runs does not impact on the tactical considerations for winning the game. In limited overs cricket rulesets such as One Day International and Twenty20 each team only get one chance to bat and have a set amount of overs to do so, requiring the team batting first to post the largest run total they can produce. Teams may elect to play more aggressively due to conditions or with the aim of increasing their net run rate in the event a tiebreaker is required for further qualification within a tournament but these attempts may instead cause a team to give away their wickets making overly aggressive shots.

In Test cricket and first-class cricket with long hours of play per day and multiple days per match teams can accumulate runs for as long as they can avoid losing their wickets. An excessive accumulation of runs by one team will increase the likelihood of a draw where the full allocation of innings is not completed. Tactical considerations see teams declare their innings closed before all their batsmen are dismissed. The first innings in particular is known for excessive scoring and the "follow-on" rule encourages teams to stay on the pitch. If the team who batted first have a high enough lead when their opposition are dismissed in the second innings, the team who are still in the lead can elect to "enforce the follow on", requiring their opponents to bat again. If the team batting again fail to reach the total, they lose "by an innings" and the runs remaining and the team who enforced the follow on are not required to bat again.

Individual players may feel they have scored enough runs already during their innings and elect to retire out. This action is considered unsporting when there are no extenuating circumstances such as an illness or injury. It is subsequently extremely rare. It has only occurred twice in Test Cricket, in the same game where Marvan Atapattu (scoring 201) and Mahela Jayawardene (150) retired against a highly inferior Bangladesh team.

=== Curling ===
One of the unique rules of curling allows for the losing team to concede a match at any time, thereby preventing blowouts from occurring. In fact, it is sometimes considered unsportsmanlike for a team that is losing badly to not concede. For some major events, a game must play a certain amount of ends to be considered complete. As a protest, some teams that would have conceded earlier in the match may not take the game seriously at that point.

Before teams were allowed to concede matches well before the normal end of the game, blowouts were common.

=== Ice hockey ===
In ice hockey, complaints are quite rare, for the simple reason that unless there is a gross disparity in skill, teams generally do not score large numbers of goals at will against the opposition. A mercy rule also may come into effect at pre-high-school levels, where such disparities might come into play as a matter of course. Another tactic could be the coach of the leading team telling his team that everybody must touch the puck before a shot is taken.

=== Lacrosse ===
High scores, and wide margins of victory, are not uncommon in field lacrosse. While there is no mercy rule ending the game at a certain point, in American high school lacrosse the game is played in running time, with the clock stopped only for timeouts and injuries, should one team open up a lead of 12 goals or more in the second half.

Teams have been criticized for high scores at the expense of weak opponents. In a 2019 college game, NCAA Division II Colorado Mesa (CMU) defeated Division III Johnson & Wales-Denver (J&W) 52–0, setting an NCAA record for most goals, and largest margin of victory, in any college men's lacrosse game at any level. (Note: The previous record for Division II had also been set by CMU's 33-0 victory over J&W the previous season.) Among many of the game's lopsided statistics, Johnson & Wales was unable to get a single shot while the victors recorded 81 (68 of which were on goal), won all but three of 56 face-offs and picked up all but nine of 81 ground balls. Twenty-one of Mesa's players scored at least once, more than all the players J&W put on the field. The game was ended early in the fourth quarter after a Mesa player was injured seriously enough to require hospitalization following the game's final goal.

Sports Illustrated said it was "perhaps the most one-sided game in the history of NCAA sports", rivaling the Cumberland-Georgia Tech game. CMU was criticized for continuing to shoot on goal and not letting the shot clock (a new rule in NCAA men's lacrosse that season) expire. The university's athletic department later issued a statement apologizing for "the unsportsmanlike nature of the final score", saying that the team's coaches regret the decisions they made which contributed to that outcome and players and fans "deserve better".

=== Association football ===
In professional association football or soccer, the concept of "running up the score" is mostly unheard of; many league competitions use goal difference or goal average as a tiebreaker, meaning there is incentive for a dominant side to win by as wide a margin of victory as possible. Nevertheless, large victory margins have sometimes been criticized in the women's game.

The 2002 World Cup qualification match between Australia and American Samoa ended 31–0 for the Socceroos, setting a record for the largest victory in an international association football match that still stands today. The vast gulf in quality was known well before the match began, with Australia unhappy at having to play games against small island nations in the Pacific, with this and other lopsided contests contributing towards the reintroduction of a preliminary round for smaller teams in the 2006 FIFA World Cup qualifiers and eventually the move of Australia out of the Oceanian confederation into the more competitive Asian Football Confederation.

After the U.S. women's team defeated Thailand 13–0 in the opening round of the 2019 World Cup, setting records for both the most goals scored and the largest margin of victory in either World Cup, the team faced accusations that it had run up the score, especially since players had celebrated the later goals, including Alex Morgan's fifth goal, in the game's 87th minute, as enthusiastically as they had celebrated the earlier ones. Critics noted that many of the Thai players had been crying as the game ended. Former Canadian international Clare Rustad called the American women's enthusiastic celebrations of their later goals "disgraceful" on The Sports Network, while Kate Beirness called Morgan's holding up five fingers to celebrate her last goal "just unacceptable".

While former U.S. star Hope Solo defended the outcome—"When you respect your opponent you don't all of a sudden sit back and try not to score"—she admitted that some of the celebrations, particularly those that appeared planned, "seemed a little overboard." She found, in contrast, the postgame embrace Carli Lloyd offered Thai goalkeeper Chor Charoenying after scoring the final goal in the 92nd minute to be more emblematic of the team's values.

U.S. coach Jill Ellis defended her players by noting both the importance of goal differential in determining seeding for the tournament's elimination rounds and the need to build her team's confidence, as she was able to play some substitutes. "I don't find it my job to harness my players and rein them in, because this is what they’ve dreamed about, and this is a world championship," she told The New York Times. "When you have a deluge of goals like that, it's important." Her Thai counterpart, Nuengruethai Sathongwien, also defended the American players, who she noted had encouraged her clearly overmatched team to keep their spirits up.

Ellis also suggested that sexism was at work, wondering if as many questions about the scoring and celebrations would have been raised had a men's team won so dominantly. "Stop judging these women with patriarchal glasses," another former American star, Abby Wambach, tweeted. "You would never say this about a men's team." However, former U.S. defender Alexi Lalas, also now a television soccer analyst, said "yes we would". He feared that the celebrations and the goals had cost the U.S. team fans and "sealed themselves as villains" of the Cup.

Six days later, when the U.S. team beat Chile 3–0, the scoring players and their teammates celebrated their goals with hugs, followed by golf claps.

England defeated Latvia 20–0 in the 2023 FIFA World Cup qualifiers and were criticized for running up the score. While the English team consisted of full-time professionals, the Latvians were largely amateurs. The mother of one of the Latvian players lamented the "unnecessary humiliation". The Belgian team had defeated Armenia 19–0 in the same qualifying series, and though they did not see similar criticism, UEFA said both incidents had led to the decision to change its qualifying format so that teams would not encounter those of a vastly different level.

=== Australian rules football ===
There is no negative stigma associated with running up the score in Australian rules football, as the sport lacks any obvious means to kill off a match quickly and painlessly, and time-wasting is both unpopular with fans and discouraged by the laws of the game.

The only tiebreaker used in most leagues is the ratio of points for versus points against (known in the code as "percentage"), a system that encourages teams to record large scores and winning margins, occurring frequently when there is a large disparity between ability. Running up the score occurs in all levels of play, but it is particularly prevalent in metropolitan and country leagues, where weaker teams can often be beaten by margins of 200 points or more.

== American high school sports ==
Vast talent discrepancies between opponents happen more often in high school sports than in college or professional sports. This is especially prevalent in district competition (where schools of similar size are grouped based on geography) and regional single-elimination tournaments in which all schools (regardless of record) participate. It is even more prevalent in Kentucky high school basketball, in which a single state championship for each sex is conducted; this in turn means that district and regional competitions, and even the state tournaments, will feature games involving schools that differ vastly in enrollment. Often, a state's athletic association will seed a vastly superior team (one that has gone undefeated or has very few losses) against a very weak team in the first round (so as to avoid early-round matchups between high-seeded teams, hoping to leave those matchups for later rounds), and the talent disparity between the two teams quickly becomes obvious. (Kentucky has never seeded its state tournaments, using a blind draw to fill its brackets.)

One notorious example of many such incidents that happen each year throughout the United States was the state-ranked Walkerville High School (enrollment 98) 115–2 victory against Lakeshore Academy (enrollment 49), in a Class D district game in the 2002 Michigan High School Girls' Basketball state tournament.

In light of similar incidents, coaches are often accused of running up the score and taking the opportunity to humiliate and embarrass a weak opponent. At times, large margins of victory occur in games where the winning school's reserves (second-string and junior varsity players) played a good share of the contest and simply were able to score at will against the weaker opposition. However, when the star players are left in to set scoring records, as happened with Epiphanny Prince's 113-point basketball game in 2006, criticism usually follows.

Since 2006, the Connecticut Interscholastic Athletic Conference has considered any victory margin of 50 points or more in a football game to be unsportsmanlike. If this occurs, the winning team's coach will be suspended for the team's next game. This was in response to one coach, Jack Cochran of New London, whose teams won that way four times during 2005. During the 2005 season, Jack Cochran's New London High School football team, the highest scoring offense in CT, was shut out 16–0 by the Windham High School Whippets. In response to being shut out for the first time in his career, the following week Cochran had his team run up the score 90–0 against a much weaker opponent. The victory provoked a brawl and led to disorderly conduct charges against the losing coach. Coach Cochran defended himself by saying that in one 90–0 blowout, he had tried to get both teams and the timekeeper to run the clock continuously, as is done in Iowa when one team has a 35-point lead. The CIAC considered a similar proposal but rejected as several members felt it would cut into backups' playing time.

During a 2007 Kansas State High School Activities Association playoff game, Smith Center High School set a National Federation of State High School Associations record by scoring 72 points in the first quarter vs. Plainville. Coincidentally, the same two teams played each other only 25 days prior to the playoff contest, with Smith Center winning 72–0. During the regular season game, a continuous clock was triggered when the score differential reached 40 points, but there was no such provision in the rules at the time for its use in the playoffs. Smith Center administrators called the KSHSAA office and received permission to use the running clock starting with the second quarter of the second game with Plainville. (To avoid a recurrence, in 2011 the KSHSAA adopted a modified mercy rule for the playoffs, stating any 11-man postseason contest prior to the championship game would use a running clock in the second half once the margin reached 45 points.)

In October 2008, Naples High School defeated Estero High School, Florida 91–0. Naples was the defending Florida High School Athletic Association Class 3A champion. Despite accusations that Naples ran up the score, Coach Bill Kramer kept most of his star players out of the game for most, if not all of the game. Some Naples parents consequently called the coach to complain that their sons did not play. Five years later, in 2013, another 91–0 score between district opponents Aledo (who would ultimately win the state title, one of its state record eight) and Western Hills (who would go winless on the season) led a parent of the losing Western Hills team to file bullying charges with the Aledo school district against the Aledo head coach.

In a January 13, 2009 girls' basketball game, Covenant School of Dallas defeated Dallas Academy 100–0.

In 1926, Haven High School of Haven, Kansas defeated Sylvia High School by a score of 256–0, the highest recorded score in the history of American football.

On January 5, 2015, the San Bernardino Arroyo Valley (CA) High School girls' basketball team obliterated Bloomington High by a score of 161–2. Ten days later, San Bernardino suspended coach Michael Anderson for two games.

On September 17, 2021, the Coronado (CA) High School Football team defeated Kearny High with a score of 78–0. Coronado had a 41-point first quarter, setting a high score margin early in the game. Kearny then continued their streak of losing by a large margin, losing 76-0 during their next game against San Diego High on September 24.

In an October 29, 2021 football game, Inglewood High School defeated Morningside High School by the lopsided score of 106–0 in a game that included 13 touchdown passes. The California Interscholastic Federation-Southern Section condemned the contest and Inglewood High's principal issued an apology. Ironically, in 1990, Morningside scored 102 points in the first half of a girls' basketball game against South Torrance. South Torrance refused to come back out after halftime to finish the game. The final score was 102–24.

In 2026, Marist Catholic High School in Eugene, Oregon, fired its football coach several days after the team defeated Cottage Grove High School 63-0 in a game that was ended at halftime. Shortly before then, after going up 55-0, the Marist team attempted its second onside kick of the game, a play typically reserved for situations with little time left where the game is tied or otherwise close. Despite failing to recover the kick, Marist regained possession following an interception and scored again before the half was over. The school's athletic director said that the win "is really not reflective of the school's mission and how we want to treat our opponents."

== Stat padding ==
Stat padding is an action that improves a player's statistics despite being of little benefit to their team or its chance of winning. Examples include:

- Russell Westbrook holds the record for most career triple-doubles in the NBA, most of which involved heavy stat padding, many theorise.
- Giannis Antetokounmpo was accused of stat padding after what was judged as his intentionally missed last-second shot (and subsequent catching of the ball) in order to get the rebound he needed to secure a triple-double. The rebound was later rescinded by the NBA.
- LSU Tigers football left their starting quarterback Jayden Daniels in the game while dominating their Sun Belt Conference opponent, the Georgia State Panthers in week 12 of the 2023 college football season. Multiple observers noted the move as potential stat padding to improve Daniels's Heisman candidacy.

== Non-sporting examples ==
James Holzhauer was noted for ostensibly running up the score during his run on the game show Jeopardy!, continuing to make aggressive wagers even after it was clear the game was a "runaway victory", a term used by the Jeopardy! fanbase to indicate that, even if the other two contestants bet all their winnings in Final Jeopardy!, they would not overcome Holzhauer's leading Double Jeopardy! score. Indeed, to ensure an overall win Holzhauer only needed to bet the difference between his and two times the second-place winnings, minus $1. In this case however, running up the score is not in bad faith: because winners are awarded the actual dollar figure they earn during the show, Holzhauer had a legitimate financial incentive to maximize his winnings.

Running up the score is especially alluring in games where prizes are open-ended, or where a game's rules can be exploited to continuously win new opportunities to win additional money or prizes (as Michael Larson did in his 1984 Press Your Luck appearance; he had memorized the board to keep winning money that came with additional board spins). In games that operate on a point system, while a score can still be run up, there is less incentive to do so, since the prize is fixed; most games that operate on a ladder or jackpot system for prizes cannot be run up.
