= 2015 Richmond Raiders season =

American indoor football team season

- Owner: Mike & Elizabeth Frazier
- Head coach: James Fuller
- Home stadium: Richmond Coliseum

Results
- Record: 8-4
- League place: 2nd
- Playoffs: Won Semi-Finals 54-35 (Venom); Lost PIFL Cup IV 38-64 (Lions)

The 2015 Richmond Raiders season was the sixth season for the American indoor football franchise, and their fourth in the Professional Indoor Football League (PIFL).

== Schedule ==
Key: Win Tie Loss Bye

=== Regular season ===
All start times are local to home team

| Week | Day | Date | Kickoff | Opponent | Results | | Location | Attendance |
| Week | Day | Date | Kickoff | Opponent | Score | Record | Location | Attendance |
|---|---|---|---|---|---|---|---|---|
| 1 | Sunday | March 22 | 4:00pm | at Trenton Freedom | L 33-41 | 0-1 | Sun National Bank Center | 1,611 |
| 2 | Sunday | March 29 | 3:00pm | at Columbus Lions | L 50-52 | 0-2 | Columbus Civic Center | 3,193 |
| 3 | Saturday | April 4 | 7:00pm | Alabama Hammers | W 60-45 | 1-2 | Richmond Coliseum | 3,614 |
| 4 | Saturday | April 11 | 7:00pm | Columbus Lions | L 43-47 | 1-3 | Richmond Coliseum | 3,530 |
| 5 | Friday | April 17 | 7:00pm | Trenton Freedom | W 52-50 | 2-3 | Richmond Coliseum | 3,298 |
| 6 | Saturday | April 25 | 8:00pm | at Nashville Venom | L 49-69 | 2-4 | Nashville Municipal Auditorium | 1,570 |
| 7 | Saturday | May 2 | 8:00pm | at Alabama Hammers | W 87-58 | 3-4 | Von Braun Center | 1,875 |
| 8 | Sunday | May 10 | 2:00pm | at Erie Explosion | W 70-46 | 4-4 | Erie Insurance Arena | 473 |
| 9 | BYE | | | | | | | |
| 10 | Saturday | May 23 | 7:00pm | Trenton Freedom | W 46-40 | 5-4 | Richmond Coliseum | 3,939 |
| 11 | Friday | May 29 | 7:00pm | at Lehigh Valley Steelhawks | W 35-28 | 6-4 | PPL Center | 2,682 |
| 12 | Saturday | June 6 | 7:00pm | Nashville Venom | W 54-30 | 7-4 | Richmond Coliseum | |
| 13 | BYE | | | | | | | |
| 14 | Saturday | June 20 | 7:00pm | Erie Explosion | W 77-8 | 8-4 | Richmond Coliseum | |

=== Standings ===
2015 Professional Indoor Football League
| Team | W | L | T | PCT | PF | PA | PF (Avg.) | PA (Avg.) | STK |
|---|---|---|---|---|---|---|---|---|---|
| y-Columbus Lions | 8 | 3 | 0 | .727 | 611 | 509 | 55.5 | 46.3 | L1 |
| y-Richmond Raiders | 8 | 4 | 0 | .667 | 649 | 507 | 54.1 | 42.3 | W6 |
| x-Nashville Venom | 7 | 4 | 0 | .636 | 574 | 467 | 52.2 | 42.5 | W2 |
| x-Lehigh Valley Steelhawks | 6 | 5 | 0 | .545 | 515 | 460 | 46.8 | 41.8 | L3 |
| Trenton Freedom | 6 | 6 | 0 | .500 | 553 | 517 | 46.1 | 43.1 | L2 |
| Alabama Hammers | 5 | 7 | 0 | .417 | 555 | 645 | 46.3 | 53.7 | W2 |
| Erie Explosion | 2 | 9 | 0 | .182 | 404 | 664 | 36.7 | 60.4 | L2 |

=== Postseason ===
| Round | Day | Date | Kickoff | Opponent | Results | | Location | Attendance |
| Round | Day | Date | Kickoff | Opponent | Score | Record | Location | Attendance |
|---|---|---|---|---|---|---|---|---|
| Semi-Finals | Monday | June 29 | 7:00pm | Nashville Venom | W 54-35 | 1-0 | Richmond Coliseum | |
| PIFL Cup IV | Monday | July 6 | 7:00pm | at Columbus Lions | L 38-64 | 1-1 | Columbus Civic Center | 3,145 |

== Roster ==
2015 Richmond Raiders roster
| Quarterbacks: 3 Jonathan Bane; 10 Phil Konopka; Fullbacks: 35 Derrick Okafor; Wide receivers: 12 Gerron Bryant; 2 Daron Clark; 9 Ronald Davis; 14 Dexter Green; 1 Robert Holland; 5 Herb Jones | Offensive linemen: 77 James Carter; 56 Blade Shoop; 78 Jarius Spain; 63 Ken Van Heule; 55 Eric Weaver; Defensive linemen: 7 Alex Johnson; 94 Devin Jones; 90 Christian Lacey; 41 Chris Robinson; 75 Brandon Sparrow | Linebackers: 32 Blake Jones; 45 Brandon Robinson; Defensive backs: 21 Kevin Allen; 22 Tyrell Austin; 6 Malik Cromartie; 8 Torez Jones; 31 Maurice Thorne; Kickers: 18 T. C. Stevens | Injured reserve: -- Ammar Dyson WR (IR); Exempt List: 76 Miles Mason OL (Exempt); 20 Brian Smith DB (Exempt); 2 Devin Wilson WR (Exempt); Suspended: Currently vacant; Rookies in italics Roster updated June 14, 2015; 27 Active, 4 Inactive |
