= 2008 Erie RiverRats season =

2nd season for the American Indoor Football Association franchise

- Owner: Jeff Hauser
- Head coach: Shawn Liotta
- Home stadium: Louis J. Tullio Arena; 809 French Street; Erie, Pennsylvania 16501

Results
- Record: 10-4
- Division place: 2nd
- Playoffs: Lost Divisional (Express) 57-67

The 2008 Erie RiverRats season was the 2nd season for the American Indoor Football Association (AIFA) franchise.

On January 8, 2008 the RiverRats announced they would be leaving the Mon Valley in favor of Erie for the 2008 season, renaming themselves the Erie RiverRats. They replaced the city's previous AIFA team, the Erie Freeze. The RiverRats have several Freeze connections, including many of the Freeze's best players: QB/WR David Dinkins, cornerback Jovon Johnson (himself an Erie native), kicker J.R. Cipra, center Jonathon Sitter, and defensive tackle Roosevelt Benjamin. AIFA owner Michael Mink stated that he considers the RiverRats to be a consolidation of the original RiverRats and the Freeze with the team retaining the RiverRats name, franchise and management structure.

The RiverRats started the season 3–0 with Dinkins missing a game due to work obligations, that ultimately moved him to wide receiver so that Jarrod Highberger could start at quarterback. After 3 starts with Highberger, the team had lost 2 games in a row, with the later being focused on Highberger's interceptions, the team signed Rod Rutherford, a former NFL backup, as the starting quarterback. Rutherford gave the offense an instant shot in the arm, as he guided the team to a 7–2 record the rest of the season, earning the 2nd seed in the Northern Division. The RiverRats traveled to Reading for their playoff game, and were leading in the 4th quarter when the Express took a lead with 15.2 seconds remaining. Erie was able to get the ball at the Express 9-yard line with 5.7 seconds remaining, but Rutherford was unable to score, throwing an incompletion and was intercepted on the last play, and returned 50-yards for a touchdown.

At the end of the 2008 season, five RiverRats (QB Rod Rutherford, OL Anthony Peluso, K J. R. Cipra, LB Glenroy Watkins, & LB Roosevelt Benjamin) were named onto the AIFA Eastern Conference All-Star team.

== Schedule ==
=== Regular season ===
Date	Opponent	Home/Away	Result
March 9	Carolina Speed	Home	Won 42-21
March 15	Canton Legends	Away	Won 38-24
March 22	Columbus Lions	Away	Won 54-48
March 31	Reading Express	Home	Lost 34-44
April 11	Huntington Heroes	Away	Lost 24-54
April 18	Baltimore Mariners	Home	Won 55-40
April 25	Baltimore Mariners	Away	Won 49-17
May 3	Canton Legends	Home	Won 50-48
May 9	Huntington Heroes	Home	Won 47-43
May 17	Huntington Heroes	Away	Won 52-31
May 24	Florence Phantoms	Away	Lost 27-57
May 31	Canton Legends	Home	Won 45-37
June 7	Reading Express	Home	Won 51-32
June 14	Reading Express	Away	Lost 26-66
June 21	Rochester Raiders¶	Away	Lost 6-41
July 3	Reading Express (Playoffs)	Away	Lost 57-67

¶ Exhibition match

=== Standings ===
Team	Overall			Division		
Team	Wins	Losses	Percentage	Wins	Losses	Percentage
Eastern Conference
North Division
Reading Express	10	4	0.714	5	1	0.750
Erie RiverRats	10	4	0.692	6	2	0.833
Baltimore Mariners	4	10	0.286	1	6	0.143
Canton Legends	3	11	0.214	1	6	0.143
East Division
Florence Phantoms	10	4	0.692	4	1	0.800
Huntington Heroes	6	8	0.429	2	3	0.400
Carolina Speed	6	8	0.429	0	2	0.000
Fayetteville Guard	5	9	0.357	3	2	0.600
Western Conference
South Division
Mississippi MudCats	13	1	0.929	7	1	0.875
Columbus Lions	10	4	0.692	5	1	0.833
Augusta Colts	7	7	0.538	2	4	0.327
Florida Stingrays	0	14	0.000	0	7	0.000
West Division
Wyoming Cavalry	11	3	0.786	11	3	0.786
Arizona Adrenaline	11	3	0.786	11	3	0.786
New Mexico Wildcats	5	9	0.357	5	9	0.357
Utah Saints	1	13	0.071	1	13	0.071

- Green indicates clinched playoff berth
- Purple indicates division champion
- Grey indicates best league record

== Roster ==
2008 Erie RiverRats roster
Quarterbacks: 12 Rod Rutherford; Running backs: 62 Bob Hammer; 4 DeForest Hart; Wide receivers: 5 Eugene Baker; 10 David Dinkins; 20 Torey Morris; 80 Marko Thomas; 9 Darmel Whitfield	Offensive linemen: 49 Levon Barlow; 66 Anthony Peluso; 55 Jonathan Sitter; Defensive linemen: 51 JoValle McKenzie; 15 Densville Saunders; 54 Phil Tillman; 32 Kyle Witucki	Linebackers: 2 Roosevelt Benjamin; 7 Glenroy Watkins; Defensive backs: 1 Chris Blackshear; 3 Robb Butler; 43 Corey Oaks; 31 Sam Reynolds; Kickers: 17 J. R. Cipra	Injured Reserve: currently vacant; Exempt List: currently vacant; Failure to report: currently vacant; rookies in italics Roster updated June 14, 2008; 22 Active, 0 Inactive → More rosters
