= B. J. Hall =

American football player (born 1985)

Profile
- Position: Quarterback

Personal information
- Born: January 27, 1985 (age 41); St. Petersburg, Florida, U.S.
- Listed height: 6 ft 3 in (1.91 m)
- Listed weight: 215 lb (98 kg)

Career information
- College: Webber International
- NFL draft: 2007: undrafted

Career history
- Lehigh Valley Outlawz (2008); New Mexico Wildcats (2009); Harrisburg Stampede (2010)*; Tampa Bay Storm (2010)*; Dallas Vigilantes (2010); Iowa Barnstormers (2010)*; Tampa Bay Storm (2011); Toronto Argonauts (2011–2012); Lakeland Raiders (2013); Detroit Thunder (2014)*; Tampa Bay Storm (2014); New Orleans VooDoo (2014–2015)
- * Offseason or practice squad member only

Awards and highlights
- First-team All-Bay Valley Conference (2005); AIFA All-Star (2009)

Career CFL statistics
- Comp. / Att.: 0 / 3
- Passing yards: 0
- TD–INT: 0–0
- QB rating: 2.1
- Rushing TD: 1
- Stats at CFL.ca (archived)

Career AFL statistics
- Comp. / Att.: 60 / 114
- Passing yards: 652
- TD–INT: 10–6
- QB rating: 69.77
- Rushing TD: 2
- Stats at ArenaFan.com

B. J. Hall (born January 27, 1985) is an American former professional football quarterback. Hall played college football at Webber International University.

== College career ==
Hall began his college career at Troy State University before transferring to Solano Community College. Upon graduation from Solano, Hall transferred to Webber International University, where he played the 2006 season with the Warriors.

== Professional career ==
Hall has played for multiple teams throughout his career, including the Lehigh Valley Outlawz, New Mexico Wildcats, Dallas Vigilantes, Tampa Bay Storm, Toronto Argonauts, and Lakeland Raiders. On April 24, 2014, Hall rejoined the Storm. Hall was reassigned by the Storm on May 23, 2014, and was assigned to the New Orleans VooDoo on May 28, 2014.
