= 2015 Nashville Venom season =

- Owner: Jeff Knight; Terry Burns
- General manager: Billy Back
- Head coach: Billy Back
- Home stadium: Nashville Municipal Auditorium

Results
- Record: 7-4
- League place: 3rd
- Playoffs: Lost semi-finals 35-54 (Raiders)

The 2015 Nashville Venom season was the second and final season for the indoor football franchise, and their second in the Professional Indoor Football League (PIFL).

== Schedule ==
Key: Win Tie Loss Bye

=== Regular season ===
All start times are local to home team

Week	Day	Date	Kickoff	Opponent	Results		Location
Week	Day	Date	Kickoff	Opponent	Score	Record	Location
1	BYE						
2	Friday	March 27	8:00pm	Alabama Hammers	L 26-34	0-1	Nashville Municipal Auditorium
3	Friday	April 3	8:00pm	Lehigh Valley Steelhawks	W 55-28	1-1	Nashville Municipal Auditorium
4	Saturday	April 11	8:00pm	at Alabama Hammers	L 52-55	1-2	Von Braun Center
5	Saturday	April 18	7:00pm	at Columbus Lions	W 58-55	2-2	Columbus Civic Center
6	Saturday	April 25	8:00pm	Richmond Raiders	W 69-49	3-2	Nashville Municipal Auditorium
7	Sunday	May 3	2:00pm	at Erie Explosion	W 63-35	4-2	Erie Insurance Arena
8	BYE						
9	Sunday	May 17	2:00pm	Columbus Lions	L 38-44	4-3	Nashville Municipal Auditorium
10	BYE						
11	Friday	May 29	8:00pm	Marion Blue Racers	W 65-38	5-3	Nashville Municipal Auditorium
12	Saturday	June 6	7:00pm	at Richmond Raiders	L 30-54	5-4	Richmond Coliseum
13	Friday	June 12	8:00pm	Erie Explosion	W 61-38	6-4	Nashville Municipal Auditorium
14	Saturday	June 20	7:00pm	at Trenton Freedom	W 57-37	7-4	Sun National Bank Center

=== Standings ===
2015 Professional Indoor Football League
Team	W	L	T	PCT	PF	PA	PF (Avg.)	PA (Avg.)	STK
y-Columbus Lions	8	3	0	.727	611	509	55.5	46.3	L1
y-Richmond Raiders	8	4	0	.667	649	507	54.1	42.3	W6
x-Nashville Venom	7	4	0	.636	574	467	52.2	42.5	W2
x-Lehigh Valley Steelhawks	6	5	0	.545	515	460	46.8	41.8	L3
Trenton Freedom	6	6	0	.500	553	517	46.1	43.1	L2
Alabama Hammers	5	7	0	.417	555	645	46.3	53.7	W2
Erie Explosion	2	9	0	.182	404	664	36.7	60.4	L2

=== Postseason ===
Round	Day	Date	Kickoff	Opponent	Results		Location
Round	Day	Date	Kickoff	Opponent	Score	Record	Location
Semi-Finals	Monday	June 29	7:00pm	at Richmond Raiders	L 35-54	0-1	Richmond Coliseum

== Roster ==
2015 Nashville Venom roster
Quarterbacks.: 1 Charles McCullum; Running backs: currently vacant; Wide receivers: 14 Darrell Holmes; 4 Jordan Jolly; 5 George Murray; 3 Dontel Watkins	Offensive linemen: 99 Stanlee Bradley; 55 Jeremy Buchanan; 72 Anthony Jackson; 61 Harry John; 71 Jordan Mosley; 85 B. J. Taylor; -- Garrison Ushery; Defensive linemen: 8 Brian Ellis; 90 Joseph Dienye; 7 James Frazier; 77 Walter Thomas	Linebackers: 11 Douglas Rippy; 6 Amius Smith; 33 Steven Turner; Defensive backs: 2 Jamie Graham; 16 Will Johnson; 19 C. J. Jones; 24 Jihad Morris; 20 Corry Stewart; 9 Kenny Veal; 21 Kenny Walton; 18 Mike Whittaker; Kickers: 38 Christian Reed	Injured Reserve: 12 Zach Ducker (IR); Exempt List: 10 Phillip Barnett WR (Exempt); -- Clay Belton QB (Exempt); Left squad: 61 Harris Bivin OL (Left squad); -- Mon Williams LB (Left squad); Failure to report: -- Terrence McCrae WR (DNR); rookies in italics Roster updated June 9, 2015; 28 Active, 6 Inactive → More rosters
