= 2015 Lehigh Valley Steelhawks season =

- Owner: Glenn W. Clark
- General manager: Michael Clark
- Head coach: Chris Thompson
- Home stadium: PPL Center

Results
- Record: 6-5
- League place: 4th
- Playoffs: Lost semi-finals 41-69 (Lions)

The 2015 Lehigh Valley Steelhawks season was the fifth season for the indoor football franchise, and their third in the Professional Indoor Football League (PIFL).

In 2015, the Steelhawks announced that they would be moving to the newly constructed PPL Center.

== Schedule ==
Key: Win Tie Loss Bye

=== Regular season ===
All start times are local to home team

Week	Day	Date	Kickoff	Opponent	Results		Location
Week	Day	Date	Kickoff	Opponent	Score	Record	Location
1	BYE						
2	Sunday	March 29	2:00pm	at Erie Explosion	W 50-43	1-0	Erie Insurance Arena
3	Friday	April 3	8:00pm	at Nashville Venom	L 28-55	1-1	Nashville Municipal Auditorium
4	Sunday	April 12	4:00pm	Marion Blue Racers	W 85-38	2-1	PPL Center
5	Saturday	April 18	7:00pm	Erie Explosion	W 59-33	3-1	PPL Center
6	Saturday	April 25	7:00pm	at Trenton Freedom	W 54-51	4-1	Sun National Bank Center
7	Saturday	May 2	7:00pm	Columbus Lions	W 46-43	5-1	PPL Center
8	Saturday	May 9	2:00pm	at Columbus Lions	L 35-45	5-2	Columbus Civic Center
9	Sunday	May 17	3:00pm	Alabama Hammers	W 50-31	6-2	PPL Center
10	BYE						
11	Friday	May 29	7:00pm	Richmond Raiders	L 28-35	6-3	PPL Center
12	Saturday	June 6	7:00pm	Trenton Freedom	L 31-48	6-4	PPL Center
13	Saturday	June 13	8:00pm	at Alabama Hammers	L 39-41	6-5	Von Braun Center
14	BYE						

=== Standings ===
2015 Professional Indoor Football League
Team	W	L	T	PCT	PF	PA	PF (Avg.)	PA (Avg.)	STK
y-Columbus Lions	8	3	0	.727	611	509	55.5	46.3	L1
y-Richmond Raiders	8	4	0	.667	649	507	54.1	42.3	W6
x-Nashville Venom	7	4	0	.636	574	467	52.2	42.5	W2
x-Lehigh Valley Steelhawks	6	5	0	.545	515	460	46.8	41.8	L3
Trenton Freedom	6	6	0	.500	553	517	46.1	43.1	L2
Alabama Hammers	5	7	0	.417	555	645	46.3	53.7	W2
Erie Explosion	2	9	0	.182	404	664	36.7	60.4	L2

=== Postseason ===
Round	Day	Date	Kickoff	Opponent	Results		Location
Round	Day	Date	Kickoff	Opponent	Score	Record	Location
Semi-Finals	Saturday	June 27	7:00pm	at Columbus Lions	L 41-69	0-1	Columbus Civic Center

== Roster ==
2015 Lehigh Valley Steelhawks roster
Quarterbacks: 7 Shane McSweeney; 11 Zach Zulli; Running backs: 54 Chidozie Oparanozie; Wide receivers: -- Terril Barnes; 3 Jerrell Jones; 5 Mack Ogletree; 1 Brandon Renford; 6 Darryl Thompson	Offensive linemen: 77 John Alvarez; 97 Tahir Basil; 75 Justin Bathurst; 68 Jarve Dean; 72 John Lavelle; Defensive linemen: 22 Gerard Bryant; 99 Rudy Cerami; 92 Larry Ford; 15 Amara Kamara; 58 Christopher Mayes	Linebackers: 12 Chris Alvarez; 33 Paul Melicharek; Defensive backs: 24 David Castillo; 2 Jesse Cooper; -- Orlando Fisher; 21 Joe Powell; 88 Tristan Simms; 4 Stefaun Whitehead; Kickers: 13 Patrick Clarke	Injured Reserve: Current vacant; Exempt List: -- Julius Gregory WR (Exempt); Failure to Report: -- Mike Colee FB (DNR); -- Allen Joyner OL (DNR); -- Terrence Osborne DB (DNR); Left squad: -- Johnathan Coleman WR (Left squad); -- Jarrel Kelley WR (Left squad); -- Rickey Roberts, Jr. WR (Left squad); -- Scooter Rogers DB (Left squad); 8 Drew Peterson DB (Left squad); Suspension: currently vacant; rookies in italics Roster updated June 11, 2015; 28 Active, 8 Inactive → More rosters
