= 2010 American Indoor Football Association season =

- League: American Indoor Football Association
- Sport: Indoor football

AIFA Championship Bowl IV
- Champions: Baltimore Mariners
- Runners-up: Wyoming Cavalry

AIFA seasons
- ← 2009 2011 →

The 2010 American Indoor Football Association season is the league's sixth overall season, and the last before its split and cessation of operations. The regular season began on Saturday, March 6 and ended on Sunday, July 4. The league champion was decided on Sunday, July 25 in the AIFA Championship Bowl IV, where the Baltimore Mariners completed a perfect season by beating the Wyoming Cavalry. Prior to the regular season, the league held its annual exhibition game in Richmond, Virginia called the AIFA Kickoff Classic.

== AIFA Kickoff Classic ==
AIFA Kickoff Classic
L	AIFA All-Stars	46
W	Richmond Raiders	49

- Located at the Richmond Coliseum in Richmond, Virginia on Saturday, January 23

== Standings ==
Team	Overall			Division		
Team	Wins	Losses	Percentage	Wins	Losses	Percentage
Eastern Division
Baltimore Mariners	14	0	1.000	14	0	1.000
Harrisburg Stampede	11	3	0.786	11	3	0.786
Erie Storm	8	6	0.571	8	6	0.571
Reading Express	8	6	0.571	8	6	0.571
Richmond Raiders	6	8	0.429	6	8	0.429
Fayetteville Guard	2	12	0.143	2	12	0.143
New Jersey Revolution	0	14	0.000	0	14	0.000
Western Division
Wyoming Cavalry	13	1	0.989	13	1	0.989
San Jose Wolves	9	5	0.643	9	5	0.643
Wenatchee Valley Venom	8	6	0.571	8	6	0.571
Yakima Valley Warriors	7	7	0.500	7	7	0.500
Arctic Predators	4	10	0.286	4	10	0.286
Ogden Knights	1	13	0.071	1	13	0.071

- Green indicates clinched playoff berth
- Purple indicates division champion
- Grey indicates best league record

== Playoffs ==
Wild Card
3	Erie	48
2	Harrisburg	52

Semifinals
2	Harrisburg	15
1	Baltimore	63
2	San Jose	37
1	Wyoming	57

AIFA Championship Bowl IV
W1	Wyoming	42
E1	Baltimore	57
