= 2015 Trenton Freedom season =

- Owner: Dennis Williams; Michael Schubiger
- General manager: Jeff Gonos
- Head coach: Kevin O'Hanlon
- Home stadium: Sun National Bank Center

Results
- Record: 6–6
- League place: 5th
- Playoffs: Did not qualify

The 2015 Trenton Freedom season was the second season for the American indoor football franchise, and their second in the Professional Indoor Football League (PIFL).

== Schedule ==
Key: Win Tie Loss Bye

=== Regular season ===
All start times are local to home team

Week	Day	Date	Kickoff	Opponent	Results		Location
Week	Day	Date	Kickoff	Opponent	Score	Record	Location
1	Sunday	March 22	4:00pm	Richmond Raiders	W 41–33	1–0	Sun National Bank Center
2	BYE						
3	Saturday	April 4	7:00pm	Columbus Lions	L 60–70	1–1	Sun National Bank Center
4	Saturday	April 11	4:00pm	Erie Explosion	W 75–23	2–1	Sun National Bank Center
5	Friday	April 17	7:00pm	at Richmond Raiders	L 50–52	2–2	Richmond Coliseum
6	Saturday	April 25	7:00pm	Lehigh Valley Steelhawks	L 51–54	2–3	Sun National Bank Center
7	BYE						
8	Friday	May 8	8:00pm	at Alabama Hammers	W 57–36	3–3	Von Braun Center
9	Saturday	May 16	7:00pm	at Erie Explosion	W 50–47	4–3	Erie Insurance Arena
10	Friday	May 23	7:00pm	at Richmond Raiders	L 40–46	4–4	Richmond Coliseum
11	Saturday	May 30	7:00pm	Alabama Hammers	W 49–35	5–4	Sun National Bank Center
12	Saturday	June 6	7:00pm	at Lehigh Valley Steelhawks	W 48–31	6–4	PPL Center
13	Saturday	June 13	7:00pm	at Columbus Lions	L 40–43	6–5	Columbus Civic Center
14	Saturday	June 20	7:00pm	Nashville Venom	L 37–57	6–6	Sun National Bank Center

=== Standings ===
2015 Professional Indoor Football League
Team	W	L	T	PCT	PF	PA	PF (Avg.)	PA (Avg.)	STK
y-Columbus Lions	8	3	0	.727	611	509	55.5	46.3	L1
y-Richmond Raiders	8	4	0	.667	649	507	54.1	42.3	W6
x-Nashville Venom	7	4	0	.636	574	467	52.2	42.5	W2
x-Lehigh Valley Steelhawks	6	5	0	.545	515	460	46.8	41.8	L3
Trenton Freedom	6	6	0	.500	553	517	46.1	43.1	L2
Alabama Hammers	5	7	0	.417	555	645	46.3	53.7	W2
Erie Explosion	2	9	0	.182	404	664	36.7	60.4	L2

== Roster ==
2015 Trenton Freedom roster
Quarterbacks: 11 Stephen Panasuk; 10 Hunter Wanket; Running backs: 6 Melik Brown; Wide receivers: 1 Antonio Allen; 3 Milton Colbert; 18 Tony Green; 13 Colin Larmond; 19 Richie Martin; 17 Antonie Rivera; 5 Landis Williams	Offensive linemen: 70 Mohamed Kourouma Ibraihm; 76 Rocco Manfre; 75 Lavon McCoy; 79 Rufus Quinn; 62 Malcolm Speller; Defensive linemen: 44 Michael Atunarse; 95 Brandon Potvin; 55 Jerome Williams	Linebackers: 2 Jerome Hayes; 8 Adrian McLeod; Defensive backs: 4 Vaughn Carraway; -- Guesly Dervil; 12 Keiron Jones; 23 Dom Joseph; 14 Serge Kona; 26 Mike McMillian; Kickers: 15 Edward Rhunke	Reserve lists: 91 Trevor Anderson DL (IR); -- Jaquan Bryant WR (IR); -- Phede Celestine OL (DNR); 14 Boubacar Cissoko DB (Exempt); 9 Tevan Ferguson DL (IR); -- Dwayne Hollis DB (Exempt); 3 Roger Jackson WR (Exempt); -- DaShawn Johnson OL (Exempt); -- Leavander Jones DB (DNR); -- Maurice Jones DB (DNR); 7 Alex Joseph LB (IR); 70 Lloyd Morrison OL (DNR); -- Keith Newell OL (Exempt); -- Jeremy Schonbrunner OL (Exempt); 90 Marques Slocum DL (Left squad); 21 Kwaheem Smith DB (Left squad); -- Warren Smith QB (Exempt); -- Nijha White WR (Exempt); Rookies in italics Roster updated June 14, 2015; 27 Active, 18 Inactive → More rosters
