= 2009 American Indoor Football Association season =

- League: American Indoor Football Association
- Sport: Indoor football

AIFA Championship Bowl III
- Champions: Reading Express
- Runners-up: Wyoming Cavalry

AIFA seasons
- ← 2008 2010 →

The 2009 American Indoor Football Association season is the league's fifth overall season. The regular season began on Saturday, March 7 and ended on Monday, July 7. The league champion was decided on Sunday, July 26 as the Reading Express won AIFA Championship Bowl III. Prior to the regular season, the league held an exhibition game in Harrisburg, Pennsylvania called the AIFA Kickoff Classic.

== AIFA Kickoff Classic ==
AIFA Kickoff Classic
L	AIFA All-Stars	26
W	Harrisburg Stampede	46

- Located at the Pennsylvania Farm Show Complex & Expo Center in Harrisburg, Pennsylvania on Saturday, January 24

== Standings ==
Team	Overall			Division		
Team	Wins	Losses	Percentage	Wins	Losses	Percentage
North Division
Reading Express	11	3	0.786	8	2	0.800
Baltimore Mariners	9	5	0.643	8	2	0.800
Harrisburg Stampede	4	10	0.286	4	6	0.400
D.C. Armor	4	10	0.286	3	7	0.300
Erie RiverRats	3	11	0.214	2	8	0.200
South Division
Columbus Lions	11	3	0.786	8	2	0.800
Fayetteville Guard	8	6	0.571	5	5	0.500
South Carolina Force	7	7	0.500	4	6	0.400
Carolina Speed	7	7	0.500	4	6	0.400
Florence Phantoms	6	8	0.429	4	6	0.400
West Division
Wyoming Cavalry	12	2	0.857	12	2	0.857
Utah Valley Thunder	11	3	0.786	11	3	0.786
Ogden Knights	4	10	0.286	4	10	0.286
New Mexico Wildcats	1	13	0.071	1	13	0.071

- Green indicates clinched playoff berth
- Purple indicates division champion
- Grey indicates best league record

== Playoffs ==
Division Championships
5	Baltimore	20
3	Reading	50
6	Fayateville	35
2	Columbus	45

Semifinals
3	Reading	60
2	Columbus	51
4	Utah Valley	31
1	Wyoming	43

AIFA Championship Bowl III
3	Reading	65
1	Wyoming	42

- Located at the Casper Events Center in Casper, Wyoming on Sunday, July 26, 2009.
