= 2015 Alabama Hammers season =

- Owner: Jeff Knight
- Head coach: Scott Sharp
- Home stadium: Von Braun Center

Results
- Record: 5–7
- League place: 6th
- Playoffs: Did not qualify

The 2015 Alabama Hammers season was the fifth and final season for the indoor football franchise, and their fourth in the Professional Indoor Football League (PIFL).

== Schedule ==
Key: Win Tie Loss Bye

=== Regular season ===
All start times are local to home team

Week	Day	Date	Kickoff	Opponent	Results		Location
Week	Day	Date	Kickoff	Opponent	Score	Record	Location
1	BYE						
2	Friday	March 27	8:00pm	at Nashville Venom	W 34–26	1–0	Nashville Municipal Auditorium
3	Saturday	April 4	7:00pm	at Richmond Raiders	L 45–60	1–1	Richmond Coliseum
4	Saturday	April 11	8:00pm	Nashville Venom	W 55–52	2–1	Von Braun Center
5	Saturday	April 18	8:00pm	Saginaw Sting	W 55–40	3–1	Von Braun Center
6	Saturday	April 25	7:00pm	at Columbus Lions	L 53–74	3–2	Columbus Civic Center
7	Saturday	May 2	8:00pm	Richmond Raiders	L 58–87	3–3	Von Braun Center
8	Friday	May 8	8:00pm	Trenton Freedom	L 36–57	3–4	Von Braun Center
9	Sunday	May 17	7:00pm	at Lehigh Valley Steelhawks	L 31–50	3–5	PPL Center
10	BYE						
11	Saturday	May 30	7:00pm	at Trenton Freedom	L 35–49	3–6	Sun National Bank Center
12	Saturday	June 6	7:00pm	at Erie Explosion	L 52–55	3–7	Erie Insurance Arena
13	Saturday	June 13	8:00pm	Lehigh Valley Steelhawks	W 41–39	4–7	Von Braun Center
14	Saturday	June 20	8:00pm	Columbus Lions	W 60–57	5–7	Von Braun Center

=== Standings ===
2015 Professional Indoor Football League
Team	W	L	T	PCT	PF	PA	PF (Avg.)	PA (Avg.)	STK
y-Columbus Lions	8	3	0	.727	611	509	55.5	46.3	L1
y-Richmond Raiders	8	4	0	.667	649	507	54.1	42.3	W6
x-Nashville Venom	7	4	0	.636	574	467	52.2	42.5	W2
x-Lehigh Valley Steelhawks	6	5	0	.545	515	460	46.8	41.8	L3
Trenton Freedom	6	6	0	.500	553	517	46.1	43.1	L2
Alabama Hammers	5	7	0	.417	555	645	46.3	53.7	W2
Erie Explosion	2	9	0	.182	404	664	36.7	60.4	L2

== Roster ==
2015 Alabama Hammers roster
Quarterbacks: 22 Billy Cosh; 8 Anthony Speight; 10 Garrett Sutphen; Running backs: 11 Erwin McGuire; Wide receivers: 20 Philander Browder; 3 Rob Brown; 5 Maurice Dupree; 4 Mico McSwain	Offensive linemen: 70 Brandon Haskin; -- Quintel Rutledge; 54 John Smith; 53 Derrick Ziegler; Defensive linemen: 72 Nicholas Finney; -- Jason Gains; -- Brandon McCauley; 42 Tony Patterson; 1 Desmond Rainford; 19 Byron Sneed; 90 Jeremiah Zene	Linebackers: 33 Tyrell Dammerman; 9 Keon Lattimore; Defensive backs: 7 Travis Blanchard; 6 Justin Broome; 18 Svante Davenport; 21 Johnnie Dixon; 2 Ginikachi Ibe; Special teams: 44 Brandon Rutherford	Reserve lists: 54 Cole Alexander OL (Left squad); -- Dominique Bacon OL (DNR); 18 Cameron Bailey WR (Exempt); -- Cameron Blake DL (Exempt); 5 Loucinel Fonfile WR (IR); -- Jeremy Grier WR (DNR); 9 Justin Kenyon WR (Left squad); -- Kenny Mainor DL (IR); 3 Charles McClain WR (Exempt); -- Andrew Mick WR (Left squad); 44 Marvin Newkirk DL (IR); -- Lance Smith FB (IR); 8 Austin Trainor QB (Exempt); -- Justin Williams DB (IR); Rookies in italics Roster updated June 4, 2015; 28 Active, 14 Inactive → More rosters
