= Alfonso Hoggard =

American football player (born 1989)

No. 1, 5
- Position: Wide receiver

Personal information
- Born: April 17, 1989 (age 37); Philadelphia, Pennsylvania, U.S.
- Listed height: 5 ft 3 in (1.60 m)
- Listed weight: 150 lb (68 kg)

Career information
- High school: Bear (DE) Caravel Academy
- College: Clarion
- NFL draft: 2011: undrafted

Career history
- Lehigh Valley Steelhawks (2012); Philadelphia Soul (2012); Erie Explosion (2013); Harrisburg Stampede (2014); Erie Explosion (2015)

Awards and highlights
- Second Team All-PIFL (2015)

Career AFL statistics
- Receptions: 1
- Receiving yards: 9
- Receiving TDs: 0
- Rushing yards: 6
- Rushing TDs: 1
- Stats at ArenaFan.com

Alfonso Hoggard (born April 17, 1989) is an American former football wide receiver. He played college football at Clarion University.

== College career ==
On November 11, 2009, he was named the PSAC West Offensive Player of the Year.

== Professional career ==
Hoggard started the 2014 season with the Harrisburg Stampede, but was released after just two games with the team.
