= Golden Spike Arena =

Multi-purpose arena in Ogden, Utah

- Interactive map of Golden Spike Arena
- Address: 1000 1200 W St.
- Location: Ogden, Utah
- Coordinates: 41°16′32″N 111°59′52″W
- Owner: Weber County
- Capacity: 6,500

Construction
- Opened: 1988

Tenant
- Ogden Knights (AIFA) (2009-2010)

The Golden Spike Arena is a 6,500-seat multi-purpose arena in Ogden, Utah. The arena hosts local concerts, trade shows and sporting events for the area. The Golden Spike Arena was the home to the Ogden Knights of the American Indoor Football Association.

It is part of the Golden Spike Event Center sports and convention complex and includes 18,000 square feet (1,700 m^{2}) of arena floor space as well as six concession stands and open-span construction. Other facilities include:

- The Auction Arena with 12,000 square feet (1,100 m^{2}) of space and seating for 350.
- An exhibit hall with 21,000 square feet (2,000 m^{2}) of space and two concession stands.
- A recreation hall with 20,000 square feet (2,000 m^{2}) of space, enough for two basketball courts and three volleyball courts.
- A 6,000-seat outdoor stadium
- A A 2,500-seat race track.
- A 400-seat indoor arena with 29,610 square feet (2,751 m^{2}) of space.

All of the indoor venues can be used for conventions, trade shows and other events, while the outdoor stadium is used for rodeos, concerts, and other outdoor events.
