= 2015 Columbus Lions season =

- Owner: John Hargrove; Keith Norred; Kike Seda; Skip Seda; Rich Jacobson
- General manager: Tanema Willock
- Head coach: Jason Gibson
- Home stadium: Columbus Civic Center

Results
- Record: 8–3
- League place: 1st
- Playoffs: Won Semi-Finals 69–41 (Steelhawks); Won PIFL Cup IV 64–38 (Raiders)

The 2015 Columbus Lions season was the ninth season for the indoor football franchise, and their fourth in the Professional Indoor Football League (PIFL). They won PIFL Cup IV over the Richmond Raiders.

== Schedule ==
Key: Win Tie Loss Bye

=== Regular season ===
All start times are local to home team

Week	Day	Date	Kickoff	Opponent	Results		Location
Week	Day	Date	Kickoff	Opponent	Score	Record	Location
1	BYE						
2	Sunday	March 29	3:00pm	Richmond Raiders	W 52–50	1–0	Columbus Civic Center
3	Saturday	April 4	7:00pm	at Trenton Freedom	W 70–60	2–0	Sun National Bank Center
4	Saturday	April 11	7:00pm	at Richmond Raiders	W 47–43	3–0	Richmond Coliseum
5	Saturday	April 18	7:00pm	Nashville Venom	L 55–58	3–1	Columbus Civic Center
6	Saturday	April 25	7:00pm	Alabama Hammers	W 74–53	4–1	Columbus Civic Center
7	Saturday	May 2	7:00pm	at Lehigh Valley Steelhawks	L 43–46	4–2	PPL Center
8	Saturday	May 9	7:00pm	Lehigh Valley Steelhawks	W 45–35	5–2	Columbus Civic Center
9	Sunday	May 17	3:00pm	at Nashville Venom	W 44–38	6–2	Nashville Municipal Auditorium
10	BYE						
11	Saturday	May 30	7:00pm	Erie Explosion	W 81–26	7–2	Columbus Civic Center
12	BYE						
13	Saturday	June 13	7:00pm	Trenton Freedom	W 43–40	8–2	Columbus Civic Center
14	Saturday	June 20	8:00pm	at Alabama Hammers	L 57–60	8–3	Von Braun Center

=== Standings ===
2015 Professional Indoor Football League
Team	W	L	T	PCT	PF	PA	PF (Avg.)	PA (Avg.)	STK
y-Columbus Lions	8	3	0	.727	611	509	55.5	46.3	L1
y-Richmond Raiders	8	4	0	.667	649	507	54.1	42.3	W6
x-Nashville Venom	7	4	0	.636	574	467	52.2	42.5	W2
x-Lehigh Valley Steelhawks	6	5	0	.545	515	460	46.8	41.8	L3
Trenton Freedom	6	6	0	.500	553	517	46.1	43.1	L2
Alabama Hammers	5	7	0	.417	555	645	46.3	53.7	W2
Erie Explosion	2	9	0	.182	404	664	36.7	60.4	L2

=== Postseason ===
Round	Day	Date	Kickoff	Opponent	Results		Location
Round	Day	Date	Kickoff	Opponent	Score	Record	Location
Semi-Finals	Saturday	June 27	7:00pm	Lehigh Valley Steelhawks	W 69–41	1–0	Columbus Civic Center
PIFL Cup IV	Monday	July 6	7:00pm	Richmond Raiders	W 64–38	2–0	Columbus Civic Center

== Roster ==
2015 Columbus Lions roster
Quarterbacks: 12 Casey Kacz; Running backs: 24 Kendrick Perry; Wide receivers: 15 Dezmond Beverly; 16 Darren Daniel; 25 Terrence Ebagua; 6 Jarmon Fortson; 1 John Harris; 8 Morrell Presley; 18 Michael Reeve	Offensive linemen: -- Martin Davis; 50 Pat Lang; 58 Dion Small; 75 Brandon Thomas; 55 Aaron Wheeler; Defensive linemen: 11 Tito Hannah; 7 Damian Thornton; 44 David Washington; 10 Kendrick Washington; 13 Jerry Willis	Linebackers: 3 Robert Caldwell; 34 Larry Edwards; Defensive backs: 20 Ed Burns; 4 Damian Daniels; 2 Roshawn Marshall; 21 Chris Pickett; 22 Marvin Ross; Kickers: 14 Lindsey Wolfe	Injured reserve: 5 Antwon Young QB (IR); Failure to report: -- Travis Cobb WR (DNR); -- Kevin Fuller WR (DNR); -- Roland Johnson DL (DNR); AFL - exempt: -- Darryl Cato-Bishop DL (Exempt); -- Dexter Davis Jr. DL (Exempt); CFL - exempt: Currently vacant; Suspended: Currently vacant; Practice squad: Currently vacant; Left squad: -- Chris Davis WR (Left squad); -- Dexter Moody DB (Left squad); Rookies in italics Roster updated June 14, 2015; 26 Active, 8 Inactive → More rosters
