= Brian Smith (defensive back, born 1990) =

American football player (born 1990)

No. 16, 24, 10
- Position: Cornerback

Personal information
- Born: September 19, 1990 (age 36); Portsmouth, Virginia, U.S.
- Listed height: 5 ft 11 in (1.80 m)
- Listed weight: 180 lb (82 kg)

Career information
- High school: Portsmouth (VA) Churchland
- College: Virginia Union
- NFL draft: 2013: undrafted

Career history
- Wyoming Cavalry (2014); Tri-Cities Fever (2015)*; Richmond Raiders (2015); Orlando Predators (2015–2016); Washington Valor (2017)
- * Offseason or practice squad member only

Career AFL statistics
- Tackles: 15.5
- Pass breakups: 2
- Stats at ArenaFan.com

Brian Smith (born September 19, 1990) is an American former football cornerback. He went undrafted during the 2013 NFL draft, and signed with the New York Jets as an undrafted free agent. He played college football at Virginia Union University.

== Life and career ==
=== Early life ===
He attended Churchland High School in Portsmouth, Virginia, where he was named First-team All-Eastern District as a kick returner.

=== College career ===
Smith continued his football career at Virginia Union University.

=== Professional career ===
==== New York Jets ====
On April 30, 2013, Smith signed as an undrafted free agent with the New York Jets, but failed to make the team's roster.

==== Wyoming Cavalry ====
Smith played the 2014 season with the Wyoming Cavalry of the Indoor Football League (IFL).

==== Richmond Raiders ====
Smith signed with the Richmond Raiders of the Professional Indoor Football League (PIFL) for the 2015 season. He set a PIFL record with 4 interceptions in a single game.

==== Orlando Predators ====
On May 27, 2015, Smith was assigned to the Orlando Predators of the Arena Football League (AFL). On August 3, 2015, Smith was placed on reassignment. On October 9, 2015, Smith had his rookie option picked up by the Predators. On May 17, 2016, Smith was assigned to the Predators. On July 5, 2016, Smith was placed on reassignment.

==== Washington Valor ====
On March 21, 2017, Smith was assigned to the Washington Valor of the AFL. He was placed on recallable reassignment on March 25, 2017. Smith was assigned to the Valor again on April 5, 2017. On May 12, 2017, Smith was placed on reassignment. On June 28, 2017, Smith was assigned to the Valor once again. On July 28, 2017, Smith was placed on reassignment. On August 2, 2017, Smith was assigned to the Valor once again.
