= Arctic Predators =

Logo

General information
- Founded: May 5, 2009
- Folded: July 1, 2010
- Headquartered: Curtis D. Menard Memorial Sports Center in Wasilla, Alaska
- Colors: Purple, Silver, Black

Personnel
- Head coach: Hans Deemer

Home fields
- Curtis D. Menard Memorial Sports Center (2010)

League / conference affiliations
- American Indoor Football (2010)

The Arctic Predators were a professional indoor football (a variation of American football) team that played in 2010 as a member of the American Indoor Football Association.

== IFL bid ==
In May 2009, the Arctic Predators announced that they were seeking an expansion franchise in the Indoor Football League to begin play in the 2010 season. At that time it was also revealed that the team would be known as the Arctic Predators with the Curtis D. Menard Memorial Sports Center in Wasilla serving as the home venue. In late June, The Arctic Predators filed the official paperwork to league offices to bring indoor football to Wasilla for the 2010 season. At the league meetings that August, the Predators were officially approved as members of the IFL. However, because of a stalemate between the Arctic Predators and a group of Wisconsin businessmen, the IFL decided to place the franchise in Kent, Washington and play as the Kent Predators.

== Move to AIFA ==
After negotiations failed with the Indoor Football League, Deemer approached the American Indoor Football Association about expansion. Their bid to join the league was approved and a 14-game schedule was put in place. The Predators started out the season 0-3 and then the first hint of financial trouble occurred when the Predators were unable to finance the Wyoming Cavalry to travel to Wasilla for their April 10 game. This game would be rescheduled to May 29 and ultimately forfeited by the Predators. Games 4-7 gave the Predators their only four wins of the season. Two by the hand of the Ogden Knights who forfeited their 2010 season due to financial trouble. The Predators fell into their own financial trouble due to high travelling costs associated with not only their own team travelling but paying for the travel of visiting teams. The Predators forfeited their remaining 4 home games and finished out the season losing to the Wenatchee Valley Venom by a combined score of 6–150.

== 2010 season ==
Week	Date	Opponent	Results		Game Site
Week	Date	Opponent	Final score	Team record	Game Site
1	March 20	at San Jose Wolves	L 12–64	0–1	Cow Palace
2	March 28	Yakima Valley Warriors	L 21–52	0–2	Curtis D. Menard Memorial Sports Center
3	April 1	at Wyoming Cavalry	L 18–79	0–3	Casper Events Center
4	April 10	Wyoming Cavalry	-	0–3	Rescheduled to May 29
5	May 1	at Yakima Valley Warriors	W 66-63	1–3	Yakima SunDome
6	May 8	Wenatchee Valley Venom	W 52-48	2–3	Curtis D. Menard Memorial Sports Center
7	May 15	Ogden Knights	W 0-0	3–3	Opponent Forfeit
8	May 17	Ogden Knights	W 0-0	4–3	Opponent Forfeit
9	May 22	at Yakima Valley Warriors	L 38-60	4–4	Yakima SunDome
10	May 29	Wyoming Cavalry	L 0-0	4–5	Team Forfeit
11	June 5	Wyoming Cavalry	L 0-0	4–6	Team Forfeit
12	June 12	at Wenatchee Valley Venom	L 6-76	4–7	Town Toyota Center
13	June 19	San Jose Wolves	L 0-0	4–8	Team Forfeit
14	June 26	Ogden Knights	L 0-0	4–8	Team Forfeit
15	July 3	at Wenatchee Valley Venom	L 0-74	4–10	Town Toyota Center

=== Final roster ===
Arctic Predators roster
- 1 Antonio Dishman
- 2 Wayne Pelfrey
- 3 Dante Jones
- 4 Monte Purvis
- 6 Andre Velazquez
- 7 Anthony Shelton
- 8 Danny O'Neill
- 9 Victor Smith
- 10 Reggie Frazier
- 11 Damion Ward
- 12 Earl Mason
- 14 Justin Robertson
- 15 DePhilips Harris
- 16 Billy Sewell
- 18 Jeff Tongate
- 22 Travis Erickson
- 25 Chris Bolin
- 27 Micah Mobley
- 32 Gab Taylor
- 33 Josh Kleven
- 36 Robyn Brantley
- 44 Randy Bendle
- 52 TJ Crenshaw
- 54 Cody Dwyer
- 55 Dan Brown
- 71 Eric Gaskins
- 72 Ron Jackson
- 77 Wade Bowen
- 81 Donnie Millas
