= Stockton Wolves =

Logo

General information
- Founded: 2009
- Folded: 2011
- Headquartered: Stockton, California at the Stockton Arena
- Colors: Black, Orange, White
- Mascot: Wolfie

Personnel
- Owner: Ryan Peterson
- Head coach: Bennie King
- President: Ryan Peterson

Team history
- San Jose Wolves (2010); Stockton Wolves (2011)

Home fields
- Cow Palace (2010); Stockton Arena (2011)

League / conference affiliations
- American Indoor Football Association (2010) Independent (2011)

The Stockton Wolves were a professional indoor football team, initially based in San Jose, California and subsequently moving to be based in Stockton, California. As the San Jose Wolves, the team played its home games at the Cow Palace, located in Daly City. The team was owned by Ryan Petersen, CEO of computer hardware manufacturing company OCZ Technology.

The Wolves were the first indoor/arena football team based in San Jose since the San Jose SaberCats, who played from 1995 until the Arena Football League suspended operations in 2009. For their first season, the Wolves played in the American Indoor Football Association's Western Conference. When the new AFL announced it was reviving the SaberCats for 2011, the team relocated to Stockton. However, after the AIFA spun off its Eastern teams into a separate league and several of its Western teams failed, the resulting "AIFA West" had too few teams to field a league that year; this prompted two of the remaining three teams, Stockton and the Reno Barons, to defect from the league, ensuring its demise. Reno and Stockton played a schedule that season comprising independent teams and each other, under the name "Western Indoor Football Association."

After what had been a season of finding replacement teams, the Wolves looked to find a more stable league. Bennie King, head coach, said that he was looking into two leagues for the future. King did not specify if he was looking into the American Professional Football League, a team of which the Wolves played against when they played at the Sioux City Bandits in the only game they played against versus a team in an actual league that year, or their old league which was trying to start up in 2012 with a new Western division, the American Indoor Football Association, or the Indoor Football League, with three teams in Washington and one in Arizona.

The revived AIFA, now going under the shortened name American Indoor Football, announced that there would indeed be a team in Stockton during the 2012 season, but that it would go under the name of the California Eagles.

== Television series ==
The 2010 television series Wolves on the Hunt was filmed during the team's training camp, and was centered around the AIFA's unique league requirement of having nine local players on the 30-man final rosters. It chronicled both the open combine system and training camp. The show was hosted by Bay Area sports personality Vern Glenn, and aired through the league's training camp and pre-season period. The show was broadcast locally in the San Francisco Bay Area on KRON-TV.

== 2010 Schedule ==
=== Preseason ===
Week	Date	Opponent	Results		Game site
Week	Date	Opponent	Final score	Team record	Game site
1	March 6	Ogden Knights	W 48–16	1–0	Cow Palace

=== Regular season ===
Week	Date	Opponent	Results		Game site
Week	Date	Opponent	Final score	Team record	Game site
1	March 20	Arctic Predators	W 64–12	1–0	Cow Palace
2	March 27	at Ogden Knights	W 36–29	2–0	(Ogden, Utah)
3	April 3	Ogden Knights	W 58–32	3–0	Cow Palace
4	April 10	at Yakima Valley Warriors	W 82–50	4–0	(Yakima, Washington)
5	April 17	at Wyoming Cavalry	L 25–54	4-1	(Casper, Wyoming)
6	Bye				
7	May 1	Wenatchee Valley Venom	W 70–38	5–1	Cow Palace
8	May 8	Ogden Knights	W 71–12	6–1	Cow Palace
9	May 15	Wenatchee Valley Venom	W 60–57	7–1	Cow Palace
10	May 22	Wyoming Cavalry	L 53–80	7–2	Cow Palace
11	Bye				
12	June 5	at Wenatchee Valley Venom	L 44–51 (OT)	7–3	(Wenatchee, Washington)
13	June 12	Yakima Valley Warriors	L 49–50	7–4	Cow Palace
14	June 19	at Arctic Predators	W 6–0 (Forfeit)	8–4	(Wasilla, Alaska)
15	June 26	at Yakima Valley Warriors	W 44–28	9–4	(Yakima, Washington)
16	July 4	at Wyoming Cavalry	L 26–47	9–5	(Casper, Wyoming)

=== Postseason ===
Week	Date	Opponent	Results		Game site
Week	Date	Opponent	Final score	Team record	Game site
Western Division Championship	July 11	at Wyoming Cavalry	L 37–57	0–1	(Casper, Wyoming)

== Season-by-season ==
Season records
Season	W	L	T	Finish	Playoff results
San Jose Wolves
2010	9	5	0	2nd Western	Lost WC Championship (Wyoming)
Stockton Wolves
2011	8	2	0	Independent	
Totals	17	8	0	(including playoffs)	
