= Chattahoochee Valley Vipers =

Two American football teams

General information
- Founded: 2006
- Folded: 2006
- Headquartered: Columbus, Georgia at the Columbus Civic Center
- Colors: Yellow, red, black, white

Personnel
- Owners: Steven Roddy and Dwayne Robinson

Team history
- Chattahoochee Valley Vipers (2006)

Home fields
- Columbus Civic Center (2006)

League / conference affiliations
- American Indoor Football League (2006)

The Chattahoochee Valley Vipers (or the Valley Vipers for short) were a professional indoor football team based out of Columbus, Georgia. Founded by Brian Schwelling of Acworth, Georgia (former owner of the Johnstown Riverhawks), they were a 2006 expansion member of the American Indoor Football League. Schwelling sold the team to Steven Roddy of Atlanta and Dwayne Robinson of Bermuda who operated the expansion franchise. They played their home games at the Columbus Civic Center.

They held the distinction of winning the closest game in AIFL history. In Week One, they defeated the Daytona Beach Thunder, 48–46, which was the closest game. One week later, they topped that, defeating the Rome Renegades, 40–39. Other than that, they ended the regular season at 8-6 and the SC's fourth seed. They later fell to the eventual Southern Conference champion Rome Renegades 64–39.

On August 9, 2006, Columbus City Manager Isaiah Hugley announced the city's termination of the Vipers' lease on the Columbus Civic Center, ending their sole year in Columbus, Georgia.

== Statistics ==
Season records
Season	W	L	T	Finish	Playoff results
2006	8	6	0	4th Southern	Lost SC Round 1 (Rome)
Totals	8	7	0	(including playoffs)	
