= Fan Controlled Football =

Professional indoor football league

- Most recent season or competition: 2022 Fan Controlled Football season
- Sport: Indoor football
- Founded: 2017
- Founder: FANchise, LLC
- First season: 2021
- Folded: 2025
- Owners: Fan Controlled Sports and Entertainment
- CEO: Sohrob Farud
- Commissioner: Ray Austin
- No. of teams: 8
- Country: United States
- Venue: Pullman Yards
- Last champion: Zappers (2022)
- Most titles: Wild Aces, Zappers (one title)
- Broadcasters: Twitch, VENN, DAZN, LX, and Peacock
- Related competitions: IFL
- Website: FCF.io

Fan Controlled Football (FCF) was a professional 7-on-7 indoor football league that played two seasons in 2021 and 2022. The league operated on the premise of fans voting on play calls and other in-game events. All games were played at Pullman Yards in Atlanta, Georgia and broadcast on streaming television. The league previously announced plans to return in 2024, but never did.

It was created by Project Fanchise, who established the first fan-controlled professional sports franchise, the Salt Lake Screaming Eagles, and operated the Colorado Crush to play in the Indoor Football League in 2017 before Fanchise pulled both teams out of the league.

Active roster players were paid weekly $400 (before taxes) plus room and board, while coaches were paid $6,700 per month with housing and meal plan.

== History ==
=== Origins ===
The idea, then known as Project Fanchise, was covered by The New York Times with the business concept of a fan-controlled baseball team in 2008, but was written as satirical piece by comedian Steve Hofstetter. At the time, the project was just a website created by Grant Cohen with investors consisting of lawyers such as Joe Scura. In 2010, a GOOD Magazine article described the group's business plan, including asking fans to invest in creating or purchasing a minor league baseball team to become publicly owned and operated. The project ultimately failed when purchasing an existing team proved to carry too much debt. In June 2015, an Arena Football League team minority owner, Sohrob Farudi, read about the dead project and contacted Cohen about restarting the concept as Project Fanchise.

In April 2016, Project Fanchise purchased an expansion team in the Indoor Football League for the 2017 season. The group created a mobile app for subscribed fans to vote on naming the team, chose its colors, and hire a coach before the season started. The team became the Salt Lake Screaming Eagles, and when the team began to play, the fans chose plays for the team to run. The experience successfully proved the concept of fans controlling the team, but it did not equate to success on the field finishing with a 5–11 record. Fanchise had also acquired the Colorado Crush just prior to the start of the season but did not implement the system at that time. On April 20, 2017, The Wall Street Journal reported that Project Fanchise was planning on launching a new league called the "Interactive Football League". Project Fanchise CEO Sohrob Farudi confirmed that the Screaming Eagles and Crush would finish the 2017 season. Project Fanchise folded both teams after the season and began the process to create the new league.

After a few months of being known as the Interactive Football League, it rebranded as the Electronic Football League (eFL), before settling on Fan Controlled Football in November 2017. The league planned to play all of its games in only one city with eight new teams. All games would be played in one location, Las Vegas, with fans calling plays while watching on-line via Twitch. The initial start date was for the 2018 season but was postponed. It has since garnered the backing of professional athletes including former and current NFL players Chad Johnson, Marshawn Lynch, and Richard Sherman. The league then gained backing by Lightspeed Venture Partners, Verizon Ventures, Correlation Ventures, Basecamp 2, Next10 Ventures, Bleacher Report co-founder Dave Finnocchio and Reddit co-founder Alexis Ohanian and additional team owners including Mike Tyson, Miro, Trevor May, Quavo, Greg Miller, Deestroying, and Bob Menery. In 2020, the league had re-branded once again as Fan Controlled Football (FCF).

=== 2021 season ===
The league began its inaugural season in February 2021. The FCF began play on February 13, 2021, with four teams competing in a 12-game-format over six weeks. The league uses Internet streaming as its main television platform and is streamed on Twitch and VENN on Saturdays, with reruns on FTF; the league championship is carried on the digital subchannel network LX. The FCF saw a steady increase in its viewership through its first five weeks, from 735,000 in the first week to 2.1 million in the playoffs. John Jenkins and Shawn Liotta served as coaching consultants for the league, with Jenkins having a prominent on-air role during FCF telecasts.

The Wild Aces beat the Glacier Boyz 46–40 in the final, named the People's Championship as voted by the fans, on March 20, 2021. At the end of the 2021 season, Farudi stated that the league planned to play two seasons a year, one in the spring and one in the fall, and was planning to expand to 20 teams by year five.

=== 2022 season ===
The FCF's second season, nicknamed "Season v.2.0" by the league, was scheduled to begin in fall 2021 but was postponed to Spring 2022 to follow after the NFL's Super Bowl. The league announced they were expanding to eight teams for the 2022 season and announced a new broadcast deal with NBCUniversal subsidiary NBCLX and Peacock to broadcast every game of the 2022 season. In October 2021, the FCF announced the Ballerz Collective and two of the four expansion teams, Team KoD and Team 8oki, later to be given names. The final two expansion teams were announced on January 12, 2022, Team Gutter Cats, and Team Bored Apes, also later to be given names. The defending champion Wild Aces reorganized and rebranded as the Shoulda Been Stars following the departure of one of its co-owners.

On January 12, 2022, the FCF announced a $40 million investment, led by Animoca Brands and Delphi Digital, for spectator-controlled football games. Ahead of the 2022 season, the league began construction on a 1,500-seat arena at Pullman Yard in Atlanta, Georgia. The second season, dubbed "Season v2.0", began on April 16, thus putting FCF in direct competition with the 2022 USFL season that launched on the same night. Before the start of the season, it was announced that Pro Football Hall of Famer Terrell Owens, age 48, will come out of retirement to play for the Zappers. He would later be traded to the Knights of Degen. On May 20, it was reported that Michael Vick will join him in the league, but he later denied those rumors. In the championship game the Zappers would beat the Bored Ape FC to win the 2022 FCF Championship.

=== 2023 postponed season ===
In February 2023 the league announced the postponement of the 2023 season with intent of adapting the Fan Controlled concept to basketball. In June, Farudi granted an interview to Sports Business Journal stating that it was pausing the league for the time being due to a loss of capital funding that hit the company in late 2022, as most of its funding was tied to the cryptocurrency bubble; the company will remain active as Fan Controlled Sports & Entertainment with the intention of licensing their intellectual property and technology to other leagues, in the hopes that the league could be revived if buyers could be found for each of the league's eight teams. Farudi noted that he had brought on Jerry Kurz, a former Arena Football League executive, to lead the efforts to find franchise owners. Kurz had returned to the AFL by June 2024, before such owners could be found.

In December 2023, it was reported that the league plans to return in 2024. This time the FCF plans to play in several locations, with six-to-eight teams for the v3.0 Season, and aim to expand to 20 teams within the next five years. According to the report, a formal announcement was to be expected in the first quarter (Q1) of 2024, but that never materialized.

=== End of Fan Controlled Sports + Entertainment ===
As of 2025, Fan Controlled Sports + Entertainment (owners of the former Fan Controlled Football) has apparently folded with no social media updates since October 2024.

== Rules ==
- Games consist of two 20-minute halves, with the league aiming to complete each game in approximately one hour. There is a 6-minute halftime interval. The clock runs continuously except in the final 30 seconds of each half and overtime, when the clock stops after each play. There is a 10-minute overtime period in case of a tie; each team getting one possession to start the period. The winner is the team leading after one possession; it's sudden death thereafter.
- Rock, paper, scissors replaces the coin toss.
- Seven players play on each side of the ball, with three men on the offensive line. (This is less than Arena Football's eight players on each side of the ball.)
- Each team has one timeout. Teams have access to three "power-ups:" a fifth down (giving an offensive team an extra play to avoid a turnover on downs), Flip the Field (moving the ball back to the offensive team's 10-yard line), or a power play (which forces the opposing team to play the next play with only six players).
- There is no kicking or punting. All offensive possessions that do not result from turnovers begin on the 10-yard line.
- The FCF uses the onside conversion option introduced in the Alliance of American Football. A team may attempt one play to gain ten yards from their own 10-yard line to retain possession. Through most of the season, teams could use the rule after any touchdown; after a team attempted to abuse the rule in a week 4 contest, it was revised so that only a trailing team could use the onside conversion.
- The two-point conversion is played one on one between a wide receiver and a defensive back from the five-yard line, with the quarterback having 3.5 seconds to throw the football. There is a one-point conversion option where the ball is placed at the ten-yard line.
- Team rosters are reset and dispersed every week in a draft, with the exception of two players who are given a franchise tag and remain on a team's roster throughout the season. Defensive and offensive lines are drafted as groups and play together through the entire season to improve team chemistry and quality of play. Franchise-tagged players can be traded only with supermajority approval in a fan vote.
- The backup quarterback on each squad must play at least one possession for every two that the starting quarterback plays, unless one of the two is injured. This rule has been dropped after the first season.
- Fans vote on all offensive plays in real time and decide the outcomes of instant replay reviews.
- Teams are split into two divisions, the OGs and the Ballerz, playing every division rival twice, along with one nondivisional matchup per season. The top two teams from each division make the playoffs.

== Teams ==
Team	Colors	Joined	Owners
Beasts		2021	Marshawn Lynch, Todd Gurley, Miro, Marcus Peters, and Renee Montgomery
Glacier Boyz		2021	Richard Sherman, Quavo, Deestroying, and formerly Adin Ross
Zappers		2021	Trevor May, Dalvin Cook, Bob Menery, and Ronnie 2k
Shoulda Been Stars (originally the Wild Aces)		2021	Austin Ekeler, Rachel Lindsay, Druski, and Altered State Machines.
8oki		2022	Steve Aoki and 888 Crypto.
Knights of Degen		2022	Drew Austin, Jack Settleman, Tiki Barber, Ronde Barber, Cynthia Frelund, Blake Jamieson, Shara Senderoff, Mike O'Day, Jared Augustine, and Jasmine Maetta
Bored Ape Football Club		2022	Lyndsey Byrnes, beijingdou (Josh Ong), JerseyBorn (Sean Semola), tropoFarmer, ElectionDayMad1 and KingKhah (AJ Khah)
Kingpins		2022	Jamal Anderson, SPOTTIE WIFI, Dr. Leo DiCatrio (Cory Teer), and ABigThingBadly

=== Announced future teams ===
Ownership	Joining in
Flare DAO	N/A
IBM Watson	N/A

== Champions ==
People's Championships
Game	Winner	Runner up	Score
v1.0	Wild Aces	Glacier Boyz	46–40
v2.0	Zappers	Bored Ape FC	42–24

== Awards ==
Year	Award	Category	Result
2022	Sports Emmy	Outstanding Digital Innovations	Nominated
2023	Sports Emmy	Outstanding Interactive Experience - Event Coverage	Nominated
2023	Sports Emmy	Outstanding Digital Innovations	Nominated
