= Erie Explosion =

American indoor football team

Logo

General information
- Founded: 2007
- Folded: 2015
- Headquartered: Erie Insurance Arena in Erie, Pennsylvania
- Colors: Black, Orange, White

Personnel
- Owner: Bill Stafford
- General manager: Shawn Liotta
- Head coach: Shawn Liotta (2007–2008, 2010–2015); Steven G. Fulmar (2009)

Team history
- Pittsburgh RiverRats (2007); Erie RiverRats (2008–2009); Erie Storm (2010); Erie Explosion (2011–2015)

Home fields
- Rostraver Ice Garden (2007); Erie Insurance Arena (2008–2015)

League / conference affiliations
- American Indoor Football Association (2007–2010): Northern Division (2007); Eastern Conference (2008); North Division (2008–2009); Eastern Division (2010); Southern Indoor Football League (2011): Eastern Conference (2011); Northeast Division (2011); Ultimate Indoor Football League (2012): Northern Conference (2012); Continental Indoor Football League (2013–2014): North Division (2014); Professional Indoor Football League (2015)

Championships
- League championships: 2: 2013, 2014
- Division championships: 2: 2011, 2013

Playoff appearances (7)
- AIFA: 2007, 2008, 2010 SIFL: 2011 UIFL: 2012 CIFL: 2013, 2014

The Erie Explosion was a professional American indoor football team based in Erie, Pennsylvania. Founded in 2007 as the Pittsburgh RiverRats, the Explosion played in the Professional Indoor Football League, the United Indoor Football League, the Southern Indoor Football League, the Continental Indoor Football League and the American Indoor Football Association and operated continuously from 2007 to 2015.

== Franchise history ==
=== 2007 ===
The Explosion began play in 2007 as the Pittsburgh RiverRats at the Rostraver Ice Garden in Belle Vernon, Pennsylvania.

The RiverRats played their first game at Tupelo, Mississippi on February 3, 2007, losing 54–34 to the Mississippi Mudcats. Their first home game was on February 18, 2007, which they lost 35–28 to the Reading Express. Pittsburgh won its first home game on March 4, 2007, defeating the Danville Demolition 47–21. On May 19, 2007, the RiverRats set an AIFA single-game record when they scored 86 points.

=== 2008: Moving to Erie ===
On January 8, 2008, the RiverRats announced they would be relocating to Erie in time for the 2008 season, rebranding themselves as the Erie RiverRats. They replaced the city's previous AIFA team, the Erie Freeze.

=== 2009: Loss of Liotta ===
In August, 2008, head coach Shawn Liotta resigned as coach of the RiverRats and left to coach the Wheeling Wildcats. In September 2008, the RiverRats named Steven G. Folmar as the franchise's second head coach. In December 2008, owner Jeff Hauser sold the team to a group of local businessmen, headed by Jeff Plyler, Bob Foltyn and Frank Herman. The RiverRats had to replace many players on the roster, as most of the 2008 roster followed Liotta to Wheeling. As a result of all the changes, the RiverRats struggled all season to score points, resulting in offensive coordinator Paul Pennington's resignation after an 0–3 start. After dropping to 0–7, the RiverRats got their first win of the season on a last second field goal by Joe Lindway. The RiverRats ended up finishing with a 3–11 record, and missing the playoffs for the first time in franchise history.

=== 2010 ===
On September 8, 2009, the RiverRats announced that Liotta would return to Erie as the head coach for the 2010 season. In December, it was announced that owner Jeff Hauser had sold a stake in the franchise to a local group that included Jeff Plyler (owner of Plyler Overhead Door of McKean, Pennsylvania) and Bill Stafford (owner of several Subway restaurant locations in Erie), among others. The team remained in the AIFA, and the team adopted the corporate name "Erie Professional Football, Inc." in December 2009, in anticipation of a new franchise name to be announced in January 2010.

Hauser maintained a smaller stake in the team, which immediately dropped the RiverRats name. On January 5, 2010, the team announced the four finalists of the name-the-team contest; Storm, Blizzard, Pulse, and Punishers. On January 14, 2010, the team was officially named the Erie Storm via a press conference, in which the team logo and colors were also released.

On May 5, 2010, the Painesville, Ohio-based Lake Erie College sued the team over the "Erie Storm" name because their athletic teams use the "Storm" moniker. In July 2010, they dropped "Storm" in favor of "Erie Professional Football", which remains the name of the team's corporate entity.

=== 2011: SIFL ===
The Tullio Arena scoreboard following the Explosion's record-setting game from 2011.

On December 3, 2010, the team announced its new Erie Explosion identity, albeit retaining the same color scheme as the Storm. The Explosion was also one of six AIFA teams which merged with the Southern Indoor Football League (SIFL) prior to the 2011 season.

On May 21, 2011, the Explosion set a single-game franchise record, including an indoor football record, for the most points scored in a 138–0 decisive win over the Fayetteville Force. This result was due to the Force's ownership change, with second-string players taking the field. This margin of victory is the third-highest in all of professional football, and the highest in over 100 years. Only the 1904 Massillon Tigers (who won a game 148–0) and the 1904 Watertown Red & Black club (who won a game 142–0) have had wider leads.

The Explosion finished the season with a 9–4 record, winning the Northeast Division, but were defeated 68–43 by the Albany Panthers in the first round of the playoffs. Despite the playoff loss, DiMichele was named SIFL MVP, finishing the season with 91 touchdown passes.

=== 2012: UIFL ===
On August 25, 2011, the Explosion left the SIFL and joined the United Indoor Football League. The change reunited Erie with Andrew Haines, who founded the city's previous indoor football team, the Erie Freeze. (The Explosion's departure came two weeks before the SIFL broke up into the Lone Star Football League and the Professional Indoor Football League, neither of which included Pennsylvania in its territory). Erie was tasked with replacing MVP quarterback DiMichele, who had signed with the Arena Football League's Philadelphia Soul. The job fell on the shoulders of rookie Colton Hansen. In the second game of the season, Hansen struggled in a loss to the Johnstown Generals, and he was replaced by A. J. McKenna. McKenna led the Explosion to an 8–3 regular-season record, losing the top seed in the UIFL North during the last game of the season. While still securing a home playoff game, the Tullio Arena had begun a 45-million-dollar renovation, which forced the Explosion to find a new place to host the game. The Explosion announced that they would play at Erie Cathedral Prep's Dollinger Field. The Explosion trailed going into the fourth quarter against the Marion Blue Racers, but McKenna ignited the Erie offense to 22 points in the final stanza to advance to the UIFL North Conference final.

The Explosion faced the Cincinnati Commandos, who had only lost two games all season, one of which was to Erie. The Commandos defeated the Explosion 62–40 to advance to the Ultimate Bowl.

=== 2013: CIFL and Championship ===
The Explosion left the UIFL after the 2012 season. The team remained idle for about a month, while fielding offers to join four different leagues. Owner Bill Stafford ultimately decided to join the Continental Indoor Football League (CIFL). Liotta needed to replace McKenna, who had left Erie for the Saginaw Sting (also of the CIFL). Liotta chose rookie Aaron Smetanka to lead the Explosion offense, and he did not disappoint. The Explosion finished with an undefeated regular season record of 10-0 securing the 2013 CIFL regular season championship and the #1 seed in the leagues playoff format. The Explosion hosted the Kentucky Xtreme in a league Semi-Final game May 5, 2013. They defeated the Xtreme 55–6. The Explosion defense held the leagues number 1 offense to 1 first down in the first half. The Xtreme did not score until 13 minutes remained in the game. The defensive charge was led by Ricardo Kemp who had 2 interceptions in the game. The Erie Explosion hosted the CIFL championship game on Mothers Day, May 12, 2013, where they beat the Sting, 37–36, to win the 2013 CIFL Championship Game. The 2013 CIFL Championship is the Erie Explosion's first championship, as well as the city of Erie's first championship in any league of indoor football.

=== 2014: Back-to-back champions ===
In June, 2013, the Explosion agreed to terms with the CIFL to return for the 2014 season. The team eventually won a second straight championship over the Marion Blue Racers.

=== 2015: PIFL ===
With the partial collapse of the CIFL in the 2014 season and the exodus of several of its teams to X-League Indoor Football the following offseason, the Explosion were left without a league to play in. On October 13, 2014, the Explosion announced they would be joining the Professional Indoor Football League (PIFL). The team experienced a reversal of fortune upon joining the PIFL, losing all but one of their league games in their first season in the league.

=== 2016: Suspension of operations ===
On August 23, 2015, the Explosion announced that they would rejoin the revived CIFL, which was to be a member of the Indoor Football Alliance. However, the league disbanded on November 4, leaving it uncertain where the Explosion would play in 2016; the Alliance announced it would continue as a six-team league in and of itself, with the Cape Fear Heroes, Explosion, Buffalo Lightning, Atlanta Sharks and two expansion teams playing in the circuit. On January 18, 2016, the Explosion announced they would not participate in a 2016 season, citing an inability to secure medical staff for the upcoming season. WICU-TV reported that the Lake Erie College of Osteopathic Medicine had pulled its sponsorship of the team after a high number of injuries in the 2015 season. With the suspension, 2016 was the first season since 2004 that no indoor football team played in Erie. Professional football has not returned to the city since.

Shawn Liotta went on to become a key figure in the development of Fan Controlled Football, along with his high school coaching.

== Notable players ==
See Category:Erie Explosion players

=== Awards and honors ===
The following is a list of all Pittsburgh/Erie players who won league awards

Season	Player	Position	Award
2011	Adam DiMichele	QB	SIFL MVP
2011	Kevin Concepcion	WR	SIFL Offensive Player of the Year
2012	A. J. McKenna	QB	UIFL Offensive Player of the Year
2013	Kwaheem Smith	DB	CIFL Defensive Player of the Year
2014	Aaron Smentanka	QB	CIFL Offensive Player of the Year

== Head coaches ==
Name	Term	Regular season				Playoffs		Awards
Name	Term	W	L	T	Win%	W	L	Awards
Shawn Liotta	2007–2008; 2010–2015	62	34	0	.646	5	5	2012 UIFL North Coach of the Year; 2013 CIFL Coach of the Year
Steven G. Fulmar	2009	3	11	0	.214	0	0	

== Season-by-season ==
League champions	Conference champions	Division champions	Wild card berth	League leader

Season	Team	League	Conference	Division	Regular season				Postseason results
Season	Team	League	Conference	Division	Finish	Wins	Losses	Ties	Postseason results
2007	2007	AIFA		Northern	4th	7	7	0	Lost Quarterfinals (Express) 24–32
2008	2008	AIFA	Eastern	North	2nd	10	4	0	Lost Divisional Playoffs (Express) 57–67
2009	2009	AIFA		North	5th	3	11	0	
2010	2010	AIFA		Eastern	3rd	8	6	0	Lost Eastern Division Playoff (Stampede) 48–52
2011	2011	SIFL	Eastern	Northeast	1st	9	3	0	Lost Round 1 (Panthers) 43–68
2012	2012	UIFL	North		2nd	8	3		Won North Conference Quarterfinals (Blue Racers) 56–47; Lost North Conference Championship (Commandos) 42–60
2013	2013	CIFL			1st	10	0		Won Semifinals (Xtreme) 55–6; Won CIFL Championship Game (Sting) 37–36
2014	2014	CIFL		North	2nd	8	2	0	Won North Division Championship (Sting) 46–15; Won CIFL Championship Game (Blue Racers) 38–26
2015	2015	PIFL			7th	2	9	0	
Totals						65	45	0	All-time regular season record (2007–2015)
Totals						5	5	-	All-time postseason record (2007–2015)
Totals						70	50	0	All-time regular season and postseason record (2007–2015)
