= Curtis D. Menard Memorial Sports Center =

Multi-purpose arena in Wasilla, Alaska

Coordinates: 61°34′21″N 149°31′8″W

The Curtis D. Menard Memorial Sports Center, originally Wasilla Multi-Use Sports Complex, is a 102,000 square foot multi-purpose arena in Wasilla, Alaska, designed to accommodate up to 5,000 people.

The facility consists of an NHL-size ice arena, an indoor artificial turf court, a running/walking track, three community meeting rooms, and a commercial kitchen facility.

== Construction ==
In a special referendum held in March 2002 (which saw a turnout of 14% of registered voters), Wasilla residents voted 51.7% to 48.3% in favor of approving additional half percentage point sales tax to fund construction of the $14.7 million facility. This tax increase brought the city's sales tax up to 2.5%., a 25% increase from the previous sales tax rate. The project was championed by then-mayor Sarah Palin, who had advanced the sales tax measure and had championed holding a special election for the referendum. In supporting the tax increase, Palin argued that there was strong community support for the project and cited a need for the government to provide funding since the private sector had not. Palin also argued a belief that the sports complex would contribute to lowering the city's rates of public health ills such drug abuse and juvenile delinquency. To fund the sports complex, during Palin's mayoralty the city issued $15 million in municipal bonds.

The project was significantly delayed by an eminent domain lawsuit brought by the prior landowner, Gary Lundgren. At Palin's instruction, the city had begun construction prior to securing undisputed ownership of the 80 acres (32 ha) of land it sat on. The city's dispute over the land dated back to 1999. The city and Lundgren had both sought to purchase the parcel of land from the Nature Conservancy. In 2002, Lundgren had acquired the land from the Nature conservancy as part of a purchase of a larger 325 acres (132 ha). The city (which Palin was mayor of) filed a lawsuit claiming ownership of a portion of the land Lundgren had acquired, but a federal court sided with Lundgren's claim of ownership, ruling that the city had never signed necessary papers to claim ownership. The city then set about buying the land from Lundgren, but a dispute arose over how much land the city would acquire. Lundgren was only willing to sell a 20 acres (8.1 ha) parcel, which the city found insufficient for its plans to use the land for sports facilities. The land was ultimately acquired through eminent domain, costing the city $1.5 million (not including its own legal fees).

In the years subsequent to its opening, the complex received heavy use but was operating with a fiscal deficit.

== Media attention ==
During the 2008 United States presidential election (in which Palin was the Republican Party's nominee for vice president), the project and the circumstances of its funding and construction drew some national attention. Palin proponents touted the project as the chief accomplishment of her mayoralty, while several national news outlets reported closer scrutiny of its financing through a sales tax hike, the cost of the litigation surrounding, and the fact that it was operating at a deficit.

In 2020, Michael Schur, co-creator of the television series Parks and Recreation, revealed that Palin's role in the construction of the sports complex had inspired a plot point in the series in which the character Ben Wyatt had previously (as a teenage mayor of a small town) bankrupted his hometown's finances by funding a planned ice rink complex called "Ice Town".

In October 2026, President Donald Trump held a rally at the sports complex. The rally was apart of the President’s strategy to turn out voters ahead of the 2026 Midterm Elections. At the rally Trump pardoned three mechanics who were sentenced to federal prison for violating the Clean Air Act. A clip of a secret service agent reaching for his waist and confronting a man went viral.
