= 2015 PIFL season =

2015 Professional Indoor Football League season
- League: Professional Indoor Football League
- Sport: Indoor football
- Duration: March 27, 2015 – June 20, 2015
- Season MVP: Terrence Ebagua (COL)

Playoffs
- 1 vs. 4 champions: Columbus Lions
- 1 vs. 4 runners-up: Lehigh Valley Steelhawks
- 2 vs. 3 champions: Richmond Raiders
- 2 vs. 3 runners-up: Nashville Venom

PIFL Cup IV
- Champions: Columbus Lions
- Runners-up: Richmond Raiders
- Finals MVP: Kendrick Perry (COL)

PIFL seasons
- ← 2014 2016 →

The 2015 Professional Indoor Football League season was the fourth and last season of the Professional Indoor Football League (PIFL). The regular season began March 27, 2015, and end on June 20, 2015. Each team played an 11 or 12-game schedule. The top 4 teams in the league advanced to the playoffs that began on June 27, 2015.

== Pre-season ==
The Erie Explosion joined the league, after playing two seasons in Continental Indoor Football League. The Explosion took the place of the Georgia Fire, who were created by the league to fill the void of the Albany Panthers, who folded in January 2014.

The Harrisburg Stampede abruptly folded prior to the 2015 season due to financial problems.

== Regular season ==
2015 Professional Indoor Football League
Team	W	L	T	PCT	PF	PA	PF (Avg.)	PA (Avg.)	STK
y-Columbus Lions	8	3	0	.727	611	509	55.5	46.3	L1
y-Richmond Raiders	8	4	0	.667	649	507	54.1	42.3	W6
x-Nashville Venom	7	4	0	.636	574	467	52.2	42.5	W2
x-Lehigh Valley Steelhawks	6	5	0	.545	515	460	46.8	41.8	L3
Trenton Freedom	6	6	0	.500	553	517	46.1	43.1	L2
Alabama Hammers	5	7	0	.417	555	645	46.3	53.7	W2
Erie Explosion	2	9	0	.182	404	664	36.7	60.4	L2

== Playoffs ==
Semifinals
1	Columbus	69
4	Lehigh Valley	41
2	Richmond	54
3	Nashville	35

Finals
1	Columbus	64
2	Richmond	38

== Awards ==
- Most Valuable Player - Terrence Ebagua, Columbus Lions
- Offensive Player of the Year - Jonathan Bane, Richmond Raiders
- Defensive Player of the Year - Jerome Hayes, Trenton Freedom
- Offensive Rookie of the Year - Casey Kacz, Columbus Lions
- Defensive Rookie of the Year - Joe Powell, Lehigh Valley Steelhawks
- Special Teams Player of the Year - T. C. Stevens, Richmond Raiders
- Coach of the Year - James Fuller, Richmond Raiders
