= Shawn Liotta =

American football coach

Profile
- Position: Head coach

Personal information
- Born: July 11, 1980 (age 46); Springdale, Pennsylvania, U.S.

Career information
- High school: Springdale (PA)
- College: Robert Morris

Career history
- Springdale High School (1999–2002); Duquesne University – Assistant Coach (2003–2004); Line Mountain Jr./Sr. High School (2004); West Shamokin High School (2005–2008); Pittsburgh/Erie RiverRats (2007–2008); Wheeling Wildcats (2009); Erie Storm/Explosion (2010–2015); Yough School District (2009); McKeesport School District (2011–2012); Saltsburg High School (2013); Clairton City School District (2014–2015); Albert Gallatin School District (2016–2017); Burrell School District (2018–2024); Wilkes-Barre/Scranton Mavericks (2025)*; Wheeling Miners (2025); Michigan Arsenal (2026)

Awards and highlights
- NCAA D-IAA Mid Major National Championship (2003); 2× Coach of the Year (2012, 2013); 2× CIFL champion (2013, 2014)

Head coaching record
- Career: 67–35 (.657)

Shawn Liotta (born July 11, 1980) is an American football coach. He was most recently the head coach for the Michigan Arsenal in the Arena Football One league.

Liotta also served as director of coaching for Fan Controlled Football, a professional football league launching in 2021. Liotta has also served as an offensive coordinator in the USA Football, US National Team Program, leading the US Under 18 National Team to a win over Canada in the 2020 International Bowl. He has also served as a high school football coach during the indoor offseason, most recently with Burrell High School from 2018 to 2024.

Liotta is the author of No Huddle No Mercy, which details his record setting offensive system a book that has been used by football programs around the world. His philosophy combines elements of the no-huddle offense and the Run and Shoot.

Over his 9 seasons as a head coach at the professional indoor level. Following the conclusion of the 2014 season, Liotta holds a 76% win percentage (58–19) during his tenure in Erie and has led his teams to 7 playoff berths in 8 seasons. For his accomplishments at the indoor level, Liotta has twice been named Coach of the Year and in 2007 was selected to coach the AIFA All-Star Game held in Florence, South Carolina..

== Early life ==
Liotta is a 2002 graduate of Robert Morris University with a bachelor's degree in Sport Management.

== Coaching career ==
=== Duquesne University ===
Liotta gained experience at the college level as the running backs coach at Duquesne University where he was a part of the Dukes 2003 NCAA Division IAA- Mid Major National Championship under head coach Greg Gattuso. Liotta has served as a coach at the Professional, Collegiate, and High School level including serving as a head or assistant coach at every level of high school football in the state of Pennsylvania.

=== Erie Professional Indoor Football ===
Liotta was hired as the head coach of the Pittsburgh RiverRats in 2007. In 2008, the franchise moved to Erie, Pennsylvania, and Liotta remained with the franchise. In 2009, Liotta left Erie to join the Wheeling Wildcats. Liotta returned to Erie in 2010. In 2011, Liotta coached quarterback, Adam DiMichele to an MVP season in the Southern Indoor Football League, as well as a Northeast Division title. After leading the Explosion to the UIFL North title game in 2012, Liotta was named the 2012 UIFL Coach of the Year. Liotta re-signed for the 2012 season. In 2012 Liotta authored a book titled Developing and Maintaining a Successful Professional Indoor Football Program. In 2013 Liotta led the Explosion to a perfect (12–0) record and the 2013 CIFL Championship. The Explosion finished with the league's top ranked offensive and defensive unit and Liotta was named the 2013 CIFL Coach of the Year. The 2013 season marked the 3rd consecutive year that Erie finished with the league's top overall offense with a different first year starter at quarterback. His brother Jeremy Liotta coordinated the defense which also finished as the league's top defense overall. In 2014 despite a large roster turnover, Liotta led the Explosion to a regular season record of 9–2. The Explosion would have to travel to Saginaw Michigan to take on the Sting, setting up a rematch of the 2013 CIFL Championship game. Erie would go on to blow out the Sting 46–15, earning the right to defend their championship against the Marion Blue Racers. The Explosion would prove to be too much for the Racers, defeating them 38–26, capturing the league championship for the 2nd year in a row. The Explosion would not fare as well in 2015 with their move to the Professional Indoor Football League, only winning one league game in their only season in that league; the Explosion folded after losing its medical sponsorship after the 2015 season.

=== Project FANchise / FCF ===
In 2016 Liotta began working with Project FANchise to educate fans on the ins and outs of professional indoor/arena football. Liotta created instructional content that was used across all platforms for the Salt Lake Screaming Eagles who competed in the IFL in 2017. Liotta's instructional materials that were featured in Sports Illustrated were used not only in building the Salt Lake Screaming Eagles franchise but also by fans around the world.

Liotta remained with Project FANchise as it transitioned to the Fan Controlled Football league in 2021, bringing on one of his mentors, John Jenkins.

=== Wheeling Minders ===
Liotta signed on as offensive coordinator for the Wheeling Miners of the National Arena League prior to the start of the 2025 NAL season, which returns Liotta to Wheeling 16 years after his stint with the Wildcats.

Before the season began, Arena Football One's Wilkes-Barre/Scranton Mavericks offered Liotta the head coaching position there, which he accepted on November 21, 2024. The Mavericks were expelled from Arena Football One in February 2025, before the start of play, and the Miners re-hired Liotta as offensive coordinator.

=== Michigan Arsenal ===
Liotta served as the head coach of AF1's Michigan Arsenal in 2026.
