= New Mexico Wildcats =

- Founded: 2008
- Folded: 2009
- League: American Indoor Football
- Team history: New Mexico Wildcats; 2008–2009
- Based in: Rio Rancho, New Mexico
- Arena: Santa Ana Star Center
- President: Steve Mascarenas, Cathy Oliver-Mascarenas
- Head coach: Floyd Johnson
- Championships: 0
- Dancers: Wildcats' Cheer & Dance Team

The New Mexico Wildcats were a professional indoor football team that played in American Indoor Football (AIF) in the 2008 and 2009 seasons. The team was based in Rio Rancho, New Mexico, with home games played at the Santa Ana Star Center (which was also home of the New Mexico Scorpions of the Central Hockey League).

The franchise was announced in January 2008, as an expansion member of the AIFA.

They won their first game in franchise history on March 30, 2008.

On Wednesday, October 22, 2008, the Wildcats hired Lance Brown as their new head coach.

== Season-by-season ==
Season records
Season	W	L	T	Finish	Playoff results
2008	5	9	0	3rd WC Western	–
2009	1	13	0	4th Western	–
Totals	6	22	0		
