= Ogden Knights =

American football team

- Founded: 2008
- League: American Indoor Football Association
- Team history: Ogden Knights (2009)
- Based in: Ogden, Utah
- Arena: Golden Spike Arena
- Colors: Sky blue, black, white
- Owner: Trademark Sports Group
- Head coach: Doug Coleman
- Championships: 0

The Ogden Knights were a professional indoor football team that began play in the American Indoor Football Association in the 2009 season. The Knights were based in Ogden, Utah, with home games to be played at the Golden Spike Arena. While it is the first indoor football team based in Ogden, the AIFA previously had the Salt Lake City-area based Utah Saints, who only played the 2008 season before folding.

On November 23, 2008, the Knights announced their nickname, logo, and colors.

The team was forced to abort its 2010 season, but planned on returning in 2011. However, the AIFA folded before the 2011 season began and the Knights did not resume operations Larry Stovall-Moody kicked the first field goal of 46 yards vs Yakima Valley Warriors at the Yakima SunDome in Yakima Washington.

== Season-by-season ==
Season records
Season	W	L	T	Finish	Playoff results
2009	4	10	0	3rd Western	--
2010	1	13	0	6th Western	--
Totals	5	23	0		
