= Yakima Valley Warriors =

- Founded: 2009
- Folded: 2013
- League: American Indoor Football Association (2010)
- Team history: Yakima Valley Warriors (2010)
- Based in: Yakima, Washington
- Arena: Yakima SunDome
- Colors
- Owner: Mike Mink
- President: Mike Mink
- Head coach: Lance Brown

The Yakima Valley Warriors were a professional indoor football team that played in the American Indoor Football Association in the 2010 season. The Warriors were based in Yakima, Washington. Their home games were played at the Yakima SunDome.

The Warriors were Yakima's first indoor football team since the National Indoor Football League's Yakima Shockwave, which played in only the NIFL's inaugural 2001 season before folding.

In August 2011, Mike Mink put the team up for sale. After being unable to secure new ownership, the Warriors team officially ceased operations in 2013.

== Season-by-season ==
Season records
Season	W	L	T	Finish	Playoff results
2010	7	7	0	4th Western	--
