= Columbus Civic Center =

Aena in Columbus, Georgia, U.S.

- "The Dragons Den" and "The Jungle"

- Location within Georgia Location within the United States
- Location: 400 4th Street; Columbus, Georgia 31901
- Coordinates: 32.450276°N 84.987699°W
- Owner: City of Columbus, Georgia
- Operator: City of Columbus, Georgia
- Capacity: 9,109 (concerts); 7,459 (hockey); 7,573 (indoor football); 7,671 (basketball)

Construction
- Groundbreaking: May 20, 1994
- Opened: August 9, 1996
- Cost: $45 million ($92.4 million in 2025 dollars)
- Architect: Odell Associates
- Project manager: McDevitt Street Bovis, Inc.
- General contractor: Genoa Construction

Tenants
- Columbus Cottonmouths (CHL/ECHL/SPHL) (1996–2017); Columbus Comets (EISL) (1997); Columbus Riverdragons (NBDL) (2001–2005); Columbus Wardogs (AF2) (2001–2004); Chattahoochee Valley Vipers (AIFL) (2006); Columbus Lions (NAL/AIFA/AIF) (2007–present); Auburn Tigers (CHS) (2010–present); Columbus River Dragons (FPHL) (2019–present); Columbus Rapids (NISL) (2021–2023)

Columbus Civic Center is a 10,000-seat multi-purpose arena in Columbus, Georgia, built in 1996.

== History ==
Panoramic view of a Columbus Cottonmouths hockey game

The arena was built in 1996, along with a Softball Complex, to fully complete South Commons (an area consisting of a baseball and football stadium, and a skateboard park). The venue replaced the Municipal Auditorium, which was constructed in 1955.

== Events ==
The Columbus Civic Center is home to the Columbus Lions indoor football team and the Columbus River Dragons professional ice hockey team. The Civic Center also hosts some Auburn Tigers collegiate ice hockey games when the Columbus Ice Rink next door is unavailable. Several other sports teams have also used the arena in the past. The Columbus Cottonmouths ice hockey team played in the arena from 1996 until 2017; the Columbus Riverdragons basketball team from 2001 to 2005; the Columbus Wardogs indoor football team from 2001 to 2004; the Chattahoochee Valley Vipers indoor football team in 2006; and the Columbus Comets indoor soccer team in 1997.

On October 10 to the 11th, Barney, and his friends: Baby Bop & BJ, and their new friend, Riff performed here in Barney Live! - The Let's Go Tour which was supposed to be filmed here and released on video, but it never happened.

The arena is also the primary concert venue in the Greater Columbus area, hosting artists such as KISS (in 1997), Kelly Clarkson (in 2009), and Lady Antebellum (in 2012). The Civic Center has also hosted several professional wrestling events, such as WWE's Friday Night Smackdown (in 2006 and 2014), and WCW Monday Nitro (in 1996).
