= 2007 Pittsburgh RiverRats season =

- Owner: Jeff Hauser
- Head coach: Shawn Liotta
- Home stadium: Rostraver Ice Garden; 101 Gallitin Rd; Belle Vernon, PA 15012

Results
- Record: 7-7
- Division place: 4th
- Playoffs: Lost North Quarterfinals (Express) 24-42

The 2007 Pittsburgh RiverRats season was the 1st season for the American Indoor Football Association (AIFA) franchise. The Explosion began play in 2007 as the Pittsburgh RiverRats, playing that season's home games at the Rostraver Ice Garden in Rostraver Township, Pennsylvania. The "RiverRats" name and logo were originally supposed to be used by the Reading Express, but that team chose the Express branding instead, freeing it up for use by another American Indoor Football League (AIFL) team. In August 2006, more arguments came about the RiverRats name as a team in the Eastern Indoor Football League, called the 3 River Rats, had intentions of suing the RiverRats to retain the naming rights of the team.

On August 20, 2006, the RiverRats signed quarterback David Dinkins, formerly of the Erie Freeze of the AIFA, and designated him as the team's franchise player for the 2007 season.

The RiverRats played their first game on February 3, 2007 on the road in Tupelo, MS, but lost 54-34 to the Mississippi Mudcats. Their first home game was on February 18, 2007 which they lost 35-28 to the Reading Express. Pittsburgh won its first home game by beating the Danville Demolition 47-21 on March 4, 2007, and then won its first away game by beating Danville a second time, on March 9, 2007, by a score of 34-29. On May 19, 2007, the RiverRats set an AIFA single game record when they scored 86 points in a single game.

The team finished their inaugural season at a respectable 7-7 record, good for fourth place in the Northern Conference and a wild-card playoff berth. However, the RiverRats were eliminated in the first round, losing 42-24 to the eventual conference champions Reading Express.

== Schedule ==
=== Regular season ===
Date	Opponent	Home/Away	Result
February 3	Mississippi Mudcats	Away	Lost 34-54
February 18	Reading Express	Home	Lost 28-35
February 23	Canton Legends	Away	Lost 11-45
March 4	Danville Demolition	Home	Won 47-21
March 9	Danville Demolition	Away	Won 34-29
March 17	Johnstown Riverhawks	Away	Lost 13-43
March 30	Johnstown Riverhawks	Home	Won 47-42
April 14	Florence Phantoms	Home	Won 66-60
April 21	Huntington Heroes	Away	Lost 34-55
April 28	Canton Legends	Home	Won 62-33
May 6	Reading Express	Away	Lost 40-57
May 12	Erie Freeze	Away	Won 52-45
May 19	Erie Freeze	Home	Won 86-72
May 25	Huntington Heroes	Home	Lost 26-69
June 9	Reading Express (Playoffs)	Away	Lost 24-42

=== Standings ===
Team	Overall			Division		
Team	Wins	Losses	Percentage	Wins	Losses	Percentage
Northern Division
Reading Express	14	2	0.875	12	1	0.923
Canton Legends	10	4	0.714	9	3	0.750
Huntington Heroes	10	4	0.714	9	3	0.750
Pittsburgh RiverRats	7	7	0.500	6	6	0.500
Johnstown Riverhawks	6	9	0.400	5	6	0.417
Danville Demolition	1	12	0.077	1	11	0.083
Erie Freeze	1	13	0.071	1	11	0.083
Southern Division
Lakeland Thunderbolts	11	2	0.846	9	2	0.818
Mississippi MudCats	11	3	0.786	9	3	0.750
Tallahassee Titans	11	3	0.786	9	3	0.750
Carolina Speed	7	7	0.500	5	6	0.417
Montgomery Bears	5	9	0.357	4	8	0.333
Florence Phantoms	4	9	0.308	4	7	0.364
Baltimore Blackbirds	1	12	0.077	1	7	0.111
Gulf Coast Raiders	0	3	0.000	0	3	0.000

- Green indicates clinched playoff berth
- Purple indicates division champion
- Grey indicates best league record
