= 2007 American Indoor Football Association season =

- League: American Indoor Football Association
- Sport: Indoor football

AIFA Championship Bowl I
- Champions: Lakeland Thunderbolts
- Runners-up: Reading Express

AIFA seasons
- ← 2006 2008 →

The 2007 American Indoor Football Association season was the league's third overall season. The league champions were the Lakeland Thunderbolts, who defeated the Reading Express in AIFA Championship Bowl I.

== Standings ==
Team	Overall			Division		
Team	Wins	Losses	Percentage	Wins	Losses	Percentage
Northern Division
Reading Express	14	2	0.875	12	1	0.923
Canton Legends	10	4	0.714	9	3	0.750
Huntington Heroes	10	4	0.714	9	3	0.750
Pittsburgh RiverRats	7	7	0.500	6	6	0.500
Johnstown Riverhawks	6	9	0.400	5	6	0.417
Danville Demolition	1	12	0.077	1	11	0.083
Erie Freeze	1	13	0.071	1	11	0.083
Southern Division
Lakeland Thunderbolts	11	2	0.846	9	2	0.818
Mississippi MudCats	11	3	0.786	9	3	0.750
Tallahassee Titans	11	3	0.786	9	3	0.750
Carolina Speed	7	7	0.500	5	6	0.417
Montgomery Bears	5	9	0.357	4	8	0.333
Florence Phantoms	4	9	0.308	4	7	0.364
Baltimore Blackbirds	1	12	0.077	1	7	0.111
Gulf Coast Raiders	0	3	0.000	0	3	0.000

- Green indicates clinched playoff berth
- Purple indicates division champion
- Grey indicates best league record

== All-Star game ==
All-Star Game
N	Northern All-Stars	58
S	Southern All-Stars	45

- Located at the Florence Civic Center in Florence, South Carolina on Friday, June 22

== Playoffs ==
Conference Semifinals
3	Huntington	43
2	Canton	76
4	Pittsburgh	24
1	Reading	42
3	Tallahassee	32
2	Mississippi	62
4	Carolina	32
1	Lakeland	55

Conference Championships
2	Canton	51
1	Reading	66
2	Mississippi	62
1	Lakeland	84

American Bowl III
N1	Reading	49
S1	Lakeland	54

- American Bowl III: Located at the Florence Civic Center in Florence, South Carolina on Saturday, June 23
