= 2008 American Indoor Football Association season =

- League: American Indoor Football Association
- Sport: Indoor football

AIFA Championship Bowl II
- Champions: Florence Phantoms
- Runners-up: Wyoming Cavalry

AIFA seasons
- ← 2007 2009 →

The 2008 American Indoor Football Association season is the league's fourth overall season. The league champions were the Florence Phantoms, who defeated the Wyoming Cavalry in AIFA Championship Bowl II.

== Standings ==
Team	Overall			Division		
Team	Wins	Losses	Percentage	Wins	Losses	Percentage
Eastern Conference
North Division
Reading Express	10	4	0.714	5	1	0.750
Erie RiverRats	10	4	0.692	6	2	0.833
Baltimore Mariners	4	10	0.286	1	6	0.143
Canton Legends	3	11	0.214	1	6	0.143
East Division
Florence Phantoms	10	4	0.692	4	1	0.800
Huntington Heroes	6	8	0.429	2	3	0.400
Carolina Speed	6	8	0.429	0	2	0.000
Fayetteville Guard	5	9	0.357	3	2	0.600
Western Conference
South Division
Mississippi MudCats	13	1	0.929	7	1	0.875
Columbus Lions	10	4	0.692	5	1	0.833
Augusta Colts	7	7	0.538	2	4	0.327
Florida Stingrays	0	14	0.000	0	7	0.000
West Division
Wyoming Cavalry	11	3	0.786	11	3	0.786
Arizona Adrenaline	11	3	0.786	11	3	0.786
New Mexico Wildcats	5	9	0.357	5	9	0.357
Utah Saints	1	13	0.071	1	13	0.071

- Green indicates clinched playoff berth
- Purple indicates division champion
- Grey indicates best league record

== Playoffs ==
Division Championships
2	Arizona	26
1	Wyoming	51
Western Conference
2	Columbus	50
1	Mississippi	52
2	Huntington	9
1	Florence	55
Eastern Conference
2	Erie	57
1	Reading	67

Conference Championships
W1	Wyoming	54
S1	Mississippi	26
E1	Florence	52
N1	Reading	37

AIFA Championship Bowl II
WC1	Wyoming	12
EC1	Florence	48

- AIFA Championship Bowl II: Located at the Florence Civic Center in Florence, South Carolina on Friday, July 25
