= 2009 Erie RiverRats season =

- Head coach: Steven G. Fulmar
- Home stadium: Louis J. Tullio Arena

Results
- Record: 3-11
- Division place: 5th
- Playoffs: did not qualify

The 2009 Erie RiverRats season was the third season for the American Indoor Football Association (AIFA) franchise.

In August, 2008, Liotta resigned as coach of the RiverRats and left to coach the Wheeling Wildcats. In September 2008, the RiverRats named Steven G. Folmar as the franchise's second head coach. In December 2008, owner Jeff Hauser sold the team to a group of local businessmen, headed by Jeff Plyler, Bob Foltyn and Frank Herman. The RiverRats had to replace many players on the roster, as most of the 2008 roster followed Liotta to Wheeling. As a result of all the changes, the RiverRats struggled all season to score points, resulting in offensive coordinator Paul Pennington's resignation after an 0–3 start. After dropping to 0–7, the RiverRats got their first win of the season on a last second field goal by Joe Lindway. The RiverRats ended up finishing with a 3–11 record, and missing the playoffs for the first time in franchise history.

== Schedule ==
=== Regular season ===
Date	Opponent	Home/Away	Result
March 15	Baltimore Mariners	Away	Lost 32–60
March 28	D.C. Armor	Home	Lost 30–34
April 4	Carolina Speed	Away	Lost 12–38
April 11	Reading Express	Away	Lost 13–47
April 18	Harrisburg Stampede	Home	Lost 31–34
April 26	Reading Express	Home	Lost 48–66
May 2	Fayetteville Guard	Away	Lost 28–58
May 10	Baltimore Mariners	Home	Won 53–50
May 23	Harrisburg Stampede	Home	Won 54–44
May 30	Harrisburg Stampede	Away	Lost 29–53
June 6	Carolina Speed	Home	Lost 21–51
June 13	Reading Express	Away	Lost 27–45
June 20	D.C. Armor	Away	Lost 28–47
June 27	Florence Phantoms	Home	Won 60–20

=== Standings ===
Team	Overall			Division		
Team	Wins	Losses	Percentage	Wins	Losses	Percentage
North Division
Reading Express	11	3	0.786	8	2	0.800
Baltimore Mariners	9	5	0.643	8	2	0.800
Harrisburg Stampede	4	10	0.286	4	6	0.400
D.C. Armor	4	10	0.286	3	7	0.300
Erie RiverRats	3	11	0.214	2	8	0.200
South Division
Columbus Lions	11	3	0.786	8	2	0.800
Fayetteville Guard	8	6	0.571	5	5	0.500
South Carolina Force	7	7	0.500	4	6	0.400
Carolina Speed	7	7	0.500	4	6	0.400
Florence Phantoms	6	8	0.429	4	6	0.400
West Division
Wyoming Cavalry	12	2	0.857	12	2	0.857
Utah Valley Thunder	11	3	0.786	11	3	0.786
Ogden Knights	4	10	0.286	4	10	0.286
New Mexico Wildcats	1	13	0.071	1	13	0.071

- Green indicates clinched playoff berth
- Purple indicates division champion
- Grey indicates best league record
