= Teddy Keaton =

American football coach (born 1976)

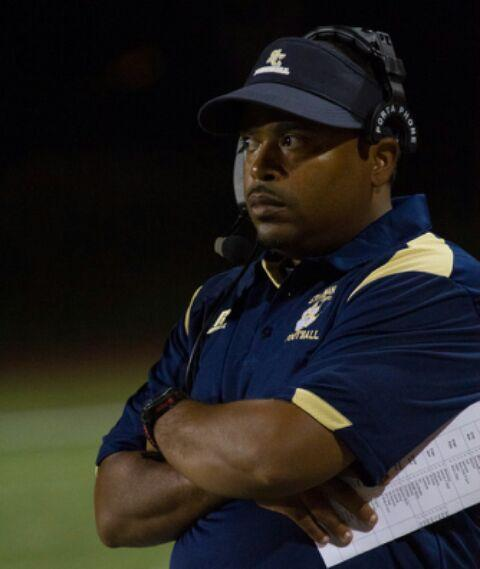
- Keaton at Stillman in 2013

Biographical details
- Born: December 14, 1976 (age 49); Brewton, Alabama, U.S.
- Education: Stillman College

Coaching career (HC unless noted)
- 1999–2004: Stillman (assistant)
- 2005–2006: Odessa Roughnecks (DC)
- 2006–2007: Lakeland Thunderbolts
- 2008: Huntington Heroes
- 2008: Webber International (DB)
- 2009–2010: Webber International (OC)
- 2011–2015: Stillman
- 2016–2017: Miles (RB)
- 2018–2023: Allen
- 2024–2025: Clark Atlanta

Head coaching record
- Overall: 55–64–1 (college); 27–5 (NIFL/AIFA)

Accomplishments and honors

Championships
- 1 SIAC West Division (2011)

Teddy Keaton (born December 14, 1976) is an American football coach. He was most recently the head football coach for Clark Atlanta University, a position he held from 2024 until 2025. He was the head football coach for Allen University from 2018 to 2023. Keaton was born in Brewton, Alabama. Keaton previously served as the running backs coach of the Miles College Golden Bears. Keaton graduated from Stillman College in 1999 and served as an assistant coach under Theophilus Danzy through the 2004 season. From Stillman, he served as the defensive coordinator with the Odessa Roughnecks and as head coach of both the Lakeland Thunderbolts and Huntington Heroes arena football teams before returning to college coaching. He served as defensive backs coach for one season before becoming offensive coordinator at Webber International University between 2008–2010. On December 2, 2010, Keaton was hired to replace L. C. Cole as head coach at Stillman. After the 2015 season, Stillman discontinued its football program. Keaton's record at Stillman was 27 wins and 26 losses.

== Coaching career ==
=== Stillman College ===
In the spring of 1999, then 5th president of Stillman College Dr. Ernest McNealey, announced the returned of football after a 50-year hiatus. McNealey announced later in the school year that Theophilus Danzy would be head coach. Danzy, eager to assemble a staff, hired Teddy Keaton as first assistant to the head coach\director of football operations, a job he would maintain for two years while completing his degree. In 2001, Keaton was promoted to special teams coordinator/recruiting coordinator/running backs coach. Under Keaton's coaching, Stillman landed its first-ever 1000-yard rusher, and specials team recorded two consecutive NCAA Division II top 20 finishes, 3rd in blocked punts, and 12th in kick returns, averaging 23.5 yards a return.

=== Odessa Roughnecks ===
Following successful seasons at Stillman, Keaton switched sides of the football and was hired as director of player personnel/defensive line coach for the Roughnecks of the NIFL. Keaton had immediate impact, with the defense line averaging 3 sacks per game. Coming off success at the defensive line position, Chris Williams then promoted Keaton to defensive coordinator/director of college scouting. With the promotion in 2005, the Roughnecks recorded its best season by posting undefeated regular season 14-0 and 2-1 playoff record. The defensive team was at the top of all defensive categories in the NIFL.

=== Lakeland Thounderbolts ===
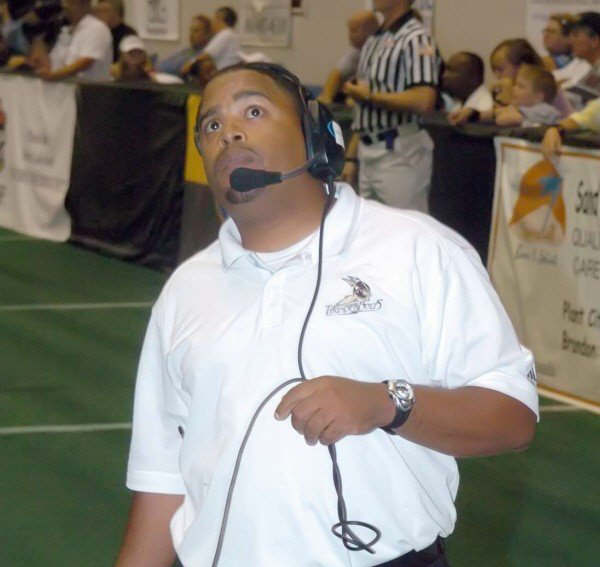
Coaching Lakeland in Championship

In 2005, Keaton acquired his first head coaching position with the Thunderbolts of the AIFA League. In his first season, the Thunderbolts finished 13-2 and 2nd in total overall defense in 2005-2006. In his second season with the Thunderbolts, they finished with an overall record of 14-2, the #1 defense, and a league high 55 interception. The Thunderbolts’ success resulted in 6 players being promoted and recruited to the Arena Football League: Terrence Royal, Tampa Bay Storm; Marvin Brown, Tampa Bay Storm; Robert Branch, New York Dragons; Brenden Givan, Nashville Kats; Othesse Wells, Nashville Kats; Larry Kendrick, Philadelphia Soul. Keaton and the Lakeland Thunderbolts finished the season with a Championship. In 2007, Keaton left the Thunderbolts because the ownership shut the program down.

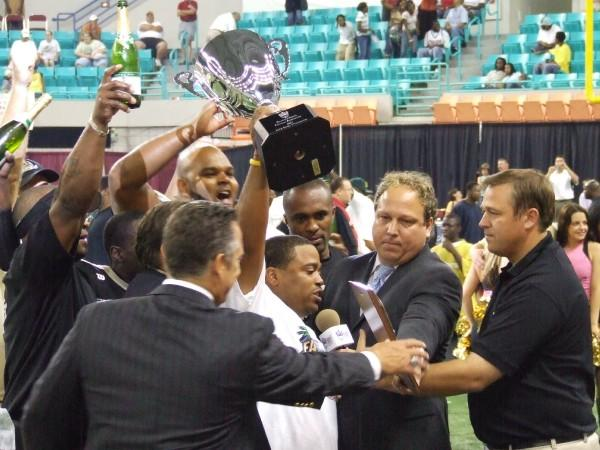
Coach Teddy Keaton holds up Championship Trophy

=== Huntington Heroes ===
In 2007, Keaton was hired as head coach of the Huntington Heroes in Huntington, West Virginia. His success continued as the Heroes ranked first place in the Eastern Division and posted a 5-1 record. The Heroes ranked at the top of all categories in Offense and Defense for the AIFA. Keaton left the Heroes midway during the season because of management's lack of support to the team.

=== Webber International ===
In 2008, Keaton returned to college coaching as offensive coordinator for Webber. The team's offense improved its ranking from an eight-year stint at 80th to 37th in his first season. Under his leadership, players received all Sun Conference honors. Additionally, Webber had its first player to ever be drafted to the NFL, Vincent Anderson to the New York Giants.

=== Stillman College ===
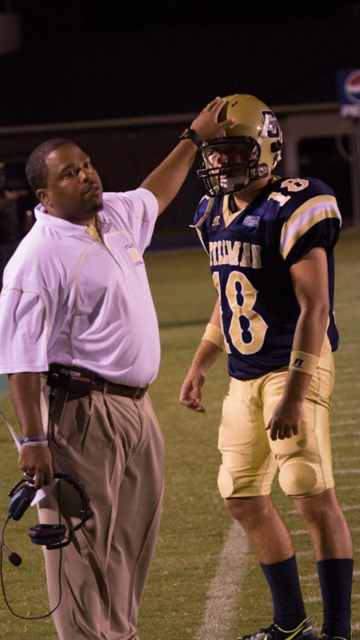
Keaton talks to Ronnie Partridge following punts

On December 4, 2010, McNealey hired Keaton, 4th coach of the Tigers, since its return of football. In his first season as head coach at Stillman, Keaton posted a 7-4 record, which tied for 1st in the Western Division of the Southern Intercollegiate Athletic Conference (SIAC), one loss shy of competing for the Conference Championship. This loss came in the last conference game of the season. During the next three seasons, Stillman posted consecutive 6-5 records. The Tigers accomplished many football honors: ranked 4th in the nation in NCAA Division II total defense, developed a 2-time All American Punter Ronnie Partridge and graduated eleven Academic All Americans. Following the 2016 season and a change in leadership at Stillman, the President eliminated all intercollegiate sports except men and women basketball.

=== Allen University ===
On January 8, 2018, Keaton was named as the head football coach at Allen University.

== Personal life ==
Keaton is married to the former Brittani Sutton and has two daughters (MacKenzie and Taylor) from a previous relationship. He is the son of Derrick and Sandra Dixon and is a member of Alpha Phi Alpha fraternity. He is also a member of the Black Coaches Association, American Football Coaches Association college football coaches association as well as Progressive Baptist Church.

== Head coaching record ==
=== NIFL/AIFL ===
Season records
Season	W	L	T	Finish	Playoff results
Lakeland Thunderbolts (NIFL)
2006	13	3	0	1st Atlantic South	Won AC Quarterfinal (Montgomery Maulers); Lost AC Semifinal (Fayetteville)
Lakeland Thunderbolts (AIFA)
2007	14	2	0	1st Southern	Won Round 1 (Carolina); Won SD Championship (Mississippi); Won Championship Bowl I (Reading)
Huntington Heroes (AIFA)
2008	5	1	0	1st Eastern	Left Team After 6 Games
Totals	27	5	0	(including NIFL and AIFA playoffs)	

=== College ===
Year	Team	Overall	Conference	Standing	Bowl/playoffs
Stillman Tigers (Southern Intercollegiate Athletic Conference) (2011–2015)
2011	Stillman	7–4	5–2	T–1st (West)	
2012	Stillman	6–5	4–3	3rd (West)	
2013	Stillman	6–5	2–3	T–3rd (West)	
2014	Stillman	5–6	4–3	3rd (West)	
2015	Stillman	3–6	1–4	T–5th (West)	
Stillman:		27–26	16–15		
Allen Yellow Jackets (NAIA independent) (2018–2020)
2018	Allen	2–6			
2019	Allen	3–6			
2020–21	No team—COVID-19				
Allen Yellow Jackets (Southern Intercollegiate Athletic Conference) (2021–2023)
2021	Allen	4–5			
2022	Allen	2–8	0–7	8th (East)	
2023	Allen	7–3	5–3	T–6th	
Allen:		18–28	5–10		
Clark Atlanta Panthers (Southern Intercollegiate Athletic Conference) (2024–2025)
2024	Clark Atlanta	7–3–1	6–2	T–2nd	
2025	Clark Atlanta	3–7	2–6	12th	
Clark Atlanta:		10–10–1	8–8		
Total:		55–64–1			
National championship Conference title Conference division title or championship game berth
