= Joe Urso =

American football player (born 1979)

No. 10
- Position: Quarterback

Personal information
- Born: March 1, 1979 (age 47); Silver Spring, Maryland, U.S.
- Listed height: 6 ft 1 in (1.85 m)
- Listed weight: 215 lb (98 kg)

Career information
- College: Wilkes
- NFL draft: 2001: undrafted

Career history
- New York Giants (2001)*; Seattle Seahawks (2001)*; Baltimore Blackbirds (2007); Chesapeake Tide (2008); Maryland Maniacs (2009); Towson Thundercats (2015); Arbutus Thundercats (2016–2018)
- * Offseason or practice squad member only

Awards and highlights
- MIFL All-Star (2016,2017,2018); MIFL Most Inspirational Player (MIP) 2016

Joseph David Urso (born March 1, 1979) is an American former professional football quarterback. He played professional arena football/indoor football in three leagues, as well as brief stints in the National Football League (NFL) with the New York Giants and Seattle Seahawks after coming out of college as an undrafted free agent. He played college football at Lycoming College, and then transferred to Wilkes University.

== Early life ==
Urso attended Bethesda-Chevy Chase High School in Bethesda, Maryland. He was the starting quarterback on the varsity team from his sophomore season on. Urso lettered 3 years in football, and also excelled in other sports, lettering 3 years in basketball, and 1 season of baseball. His senior season, he was also Captain of both the football and basketball teams. In the 1995 season, Urso led B-CC to their first ever 10–0 regular season record as a junior. The team won their first ever road playoff game, defeating Milford Mill Academy, of Baltimore County, 29–14; pushing their record to 11–0. Urso led the way passing for 285 yards and 2 touchdowns of 82 and 78 yards, respectively. The following week Bethesda Chevy-Chase hosted the first ever home playoff game in the football program's 60-year history, but fell to eventual State Champion Linganore High School 24–6.

In 1996 Urso finished his high school career with 3,969 yards passing, 51 touchdowns, and the Maryland Public Schools State passing record for both completions in a career and attempts in a career, while finishing second all-time (as of 1996) in passing yards and touchdowns in a career. Following his senior season Urso was named 1st team All-County, All-Gazette, All-league, and also named to the All-State and The Washington Post All-Metropolitan teams. He was also invited to play in the Chesapeake Classic All-Star game (Maryland high school all-stars vs. Virginia high school all-stars).

== College careee ==
In the spring of 1997 Urso signed a National Letter of Intent to attend Lycoming College in Williamsport, Pennsylvania, to play football. After his freshman season, he transferred to Wilkes University in Wilkes-Barre, Pennsylvania. By the conclusion of his college career he had compiled 5,423 yards passing and 73 touchdowns.

== Professional career ==
Out of college, Urso was signed as an undrafted free agent by the New York Giants. During the preseason he was released and then signed a week later by the Seattle Seahawks. He was then released before the beginning of the 2001 season.

Urso was the starting quarterback for the 2007 inaugural season of the expansion Baltimore Blackbirds of the American Indoor Football Association (AIFA) coached by Head Coach Chris Simpson. Urso threw the first touchdown in team history, on the road at the Reading Express. It was a 15-yard strike to WR Kevin Dixon. In the team's first home game at 1st Mariner Arena versus the Carolina Speed, Urso accounted for every touchdown his team scored with the exception of 1 (an interception return for a touchdown by DB Milton Harris), passing for 3 touchdowns and rushing for 1 more. At the conclusion of the 2007 season the Blackbirds organization folded and the team was dissolved, making Urso a free agent.

In 2008, he signed with the Chesapeake Tide of the Continental Indoor Football League (CIFL). Coached by Head Coach Matt Steeple, and Offensive Coordinator Chris Armstrong, he went on to lead the team in passing and rushing for the season—112–191 (58.6%), 1206 yards, and 26 touchdowns passing and rushing for 226 yards and 6 touchdowns. Other statistical leaders on the team include (WR/RB) Darryl Overton Jr., (WR) Joe Able, (WR) Ray McCarter Jr., and (DB) Jeff Overton. In the Tide's final game of the 2008 season, Urso had a career game in defeating the New Jersey Revolution, 55–47. On the day Urso went 20–24, with 276 yards passing and a team record 7 touchdown passes (3 to Darryl Overton Jr., 2 to Ray McCarter Jr., 1 to Daryl Disbrow Jr., and 1 to Sean Lipscomb).

In the offseason following the 2008 season, the Chesapeake Tide organization moved to the Indoor Football League (IFL) for the 2009 season, under the name Maryland Maniacs. Urso then signed with the Maniacs for the 2009 season.
