= Mud cat =

Mud cat may refer to:

- Ameiurus, genus of fish
- Pylodictis, genus of fish
- Mississippi MudCats, a football team
- Carolina Mudcats, a baseball team
- An auger dredge, often nicknamed "mud cat"
