= Silas Daniels =

American gridiron football player (born 1981)

Profile
- Position: Wide receiver

Personal information
- Born: September 22, 1981 (age 45); Jacksonville, Florida, U.S.
- Listed height: 6 ft 0 in (1.83 m)
- Listed weight: 195 lb (88 kg)

Career information
- High school: Jean Ribault (Jacksonville)
- College: Auburn
- NFL draft: 2005: undrafted

Career history
- Saskatchewan Roughriders (2005); Montgomery Maulers (2006); Columbus Lions (2007–2008); Harrisburg Stampede (2009–2010); Carolina Speed (2011)

Silas Daniels III (born September 22, 1981) is an American former professional football wide receiver.

== Early life ==
Daniels attended Jean Ribault High School, where he was an honorable mention his senior year for USA Today's 1999 Florida Player of the year honor. He signed with Auburn in 2000 and enjoyed four successful years including their 2004 undefeated season. Daniels played in a total of 42 games (2001 through 2004) for Auburn, and held the longest touchdown reception in Auburn history (an 87-yard pass from Jason Campbell in a 2004 matchup versus Louisiana Tech University) until a 94-yard connection from Cam Newton to Emory Blake in 2010 against Louisiana-Monroe.

== Professional career ==
He entered the 2005 NFL draft but was not selected, and subsequently signed to the Saskatchewan Roughriders of the Canadian Football League. Daniels signed in December 2005 to play indoor football with the Montgomery Maulers of the NIFL. The team changed their name to the Bears and moved into the AIFA, but Daniels was still listed on their roster for the 2007 season.

Daniels is 6'0", 190 lbs and achieved a 4.40 second 40-meter dash. In 2007, Daniels signed with the Columbus Lions of the AIFA, but was sidelined with a leg injury. Daniels came back for the Lions in 2008, with 68 receptions, 900 yards, and 21 touchdown season. He made the 2009 All-AIFA All-pro team with 37 receptions, 458 yards, 7 touchdowns. Daniels started 6 games at Defensive Back and totaled 20 tackles, 2 pass breakups, and 3 interceptions. In 2010, Daniels helped the Stampede make a turnaround, compiling a 12–4 record and the first playoff appearance in franchise history. Despite missing 5 games with a broken hand, Daniels still made 2010 AIFA allstar with 53 catches 563 yards 12 touchdowns 16 tackles 1 interception and 1 fumble recovery.
