= Jimmy Skinner (American football) =

American football player and coach (born 1984)

Profile
- Position: Quarterback

Personal information
- Born: May 13, 1984 (age 42); Chillicothe, Ohio, U.S.
- Listed height: 6 ft 5 in (1.96 m)
- Listed weight: 190 lb (86 kg)

Career information
- High school: Chillicothe
- College: Marshall (2002–2006)

Career history

Playing
- Huntington Heroes (2007)

Coaching
- Frederick Douglass High School (Lexington, Kentucky) (2022)

James Skinner (born May 13, 1984) is an American football coach and former quarterback. He played college football for Marshall University before playing one season in the American Indoor Football Association (AIFA).

== Early life ==
Skinner was born on May 13, 1984, in Chillicothe, Ohio. He and his sister Emily are two children born to Jim and Teresa Skinner.

Skinner played quarterback for the Chillicothe High School football team. He also earned a letter for basketball. As a four-year honor roll student, Skinner's football accolades included twice winning first team all-district honors. He committed to Marshall University in 2002.

== College career ==
Upon the end of his redshirt period during the 2002–2003 season at Marshall, Skinner's 2004 sophomore season included a total of six games played as quarterback. He played his junior season in 2005 and his senior season in 2006. While attending Marshall, Skinner majored in sports management and marketing.

== Professional career ==
Skinner was a member of the Huntington Heroes in the AIFA during the 2007 season.

== Personal life ==
While attending Marshall, Skinner was a member of the Fellowship of Christian Athletes. His paternal grandparents are Jim and Sharon Skinner. He has a maternal grandmother named Betty Clark. After his playing career, Skinner moved to Richmond, Kentucky where he and his own family reside. He became a football coach for the Frederick Douglass High School Broncos. The team won the 2022 5A State Championship.
