= Dante Booker =

American gridiron football player (born 1977)

Profile
- Position: Defensive lineman

Personal information
- Born: October 9, 1977 (age 49); Akron, Ohio
- Listed height: 6 ft 3 in (1.91 m)
- Listed weight: 285 lb (129 kg)

Career information
- College: Auburn University
- NFL draft: 2003: undrafted

Career history
- Indianapolis Colts (2003)*; BC Lions (2004); Winnipeg Blue Bombers (2006); Montgomery Bears (2007)
- * Offseason or practice squad member only

Dante Booker (born October 9, 1977) is a former professional American football player. Booker grew up in Akron, Ohio, where he was a three-time all-city selection in High School basketball. Booker played college football at Montgomery Junior College prior to transferring to Auburn University, where he majored in sociology. Upon graduation, Booker pursued a career in professional football.

== Professional career ==
Booker played for the BC Lions of the Canadian Football League his rookie season in the league. He attended the B.C.'s Abbotsford training camp the following season but was released prior to the start of the regular season. He was signed as a free agent by the Winnipeg Blue Bombers in May 2006. Following the 2006 CFL season, Booker signed to play indoor football with the Montgomery Bears of the American Indoor Football Association.
