= Huntington Heroes =

US professional indoor football team

- Founded: 2006
- Folded: 2008
- League: AIFA (2006–2008)
- Team history: Huntington Heroes (2006–2008)
- Based in: Huntington, West Virginia
- Arena: Big Sandy Superstore Arena
- Colors: Navy Blue, Red, White
- Championships: 0
- Dancers: Lady Heroes
- Mascot: Captain Hero

The Huntington Heroes were a professional indoor football franchise and member of the American Indoor Football Association (AIFA). The Heroes played their home games during their inaugural 2006 season at the Veterans Memorial Fieldhouse in Huntington, West Virginia, before moving to the larger Big Sandy Superstore Arena for the 2007 and 2009 seasons. The Heroes were the second indoor football franchise for Huntington, following the River Cities LocoMotives, who played one season (2001) in the National Indoor Football League, and were followed by the Huntington Hammer in 2011. The Heroes were usually known for featuring many former Marshall University football players from the Marshall Thundering Herd program located in Huntington.

The team's mascot, due in part to the name of their original arena, was a tribute to local military veterans. The uniform colors were red, white, and blue. The team wore blue helmets and blue home jerseys with white pants, and white away jerseys with red pants.

== History ==
The Huntington Heroes made their debut on March 11, 2006, in front of 3,100 fans at the Veterans Memorial Fieldhouse with a 62–13 victory over the Miami Valley Silverbacks. Following their first road win the following week at Johnstown, the Heroes suffered the franchise's first defeat at home on March 25, 2006, to the Erie Freeze. The Heroes got their revenge two weeks later by defeating the Freeze in Erie, 55–33, handing the Freeze their first regular season loss since their inception and standing as the Heroes' first signature win.

Two league controversies soured the last half of the 2006 regular season. On April 23, the league had scheduled the Steubenville Stampede to play at Huntington, with a return visit by Huntington to Steubenville on June 3. However, Steubenville had been given an incorrect schedule and refused to travel to Huntington on April 23 once the error was discovered. The league awarded Huntington a forfeit win and scheduled the Florence Phantoms to play at Huntington on June 10 for its seventh home game. Additionally, in a game between two teams near the top of the standings on May 6, the Canton Legends traveled to Huntington and played with four players not on their roster, including some players from other teams. Canton won the game, 54–41, but controversy followed. Initially, the league gave a forfeit win to the Heroes, but the league later ruled that the Legends would retain the win but pay an $800 fine.

Despite controversy, the Heroes finished the 2006 regular season with a 9–5 record, 4th in the Northern Conference, and qualified for the AIFL playoffs. However, the 2006 season would end in the first round of the AIFL playoffs with a 57–23 loss at #1-seed Reading Express.

On July 28, 2006, the Heroes announced that they were joining the Augusta, Daytona Beach, Rome, and Raleigh to form the World Indoor Football League. However, on August 16, the Heroes announced they would be moving to the Big Sandy Superstore Arena and that they would be remaining in the AIFL. Before the start of the following season, the Heroes joined all other AIFL league teams in disbanding the AIFL and joining the AIFA.

The early 2007 season was marked by quarterback issues. Former Marshall quarterback Jimmy Skinner and former Glenville State quarterback Joey Conrad led the team to a slow 3–3 start as well as a loss to the Carolina Speed in the exhibition Charity Bowl. Heroes quarterback coach Dane Damron traded in the headset for a helmet and suited up as started as starting quarterback in the April 7th game against the Erie Freeze. The Heroes, led by Damron at QB, would win seven games in a row (franchise record) before falling by 2 at rival Canton in the final game of the regular season that would determine who had the home field advantage in the first round of the playoffs between the same two teams.

The Heroes finished the 2007 season with a 10–4 regular season record, finishing 3rd in the Northern Conference, and qualifying for the AIFA playoffs. The Heroes made the return trip to Canton the following week, but could not match the intensity of the previous week, losing 76–43.

Following the 2007 season, coach Gary McPeek, who had led the team since its inception and compiled a 19–11 record, announced his intention to leave the team to join the coaching staff with the Lexington Horsemen in AF2. The Heroes turned to Coach Teddy Keaton from the 2007 AIFA champion Lakeland Thunderbolts to lead the team in 2008, bringing with him a professional indoor football coaching record of 50–7 plus six players from the former Lakeland team. Through the first six weeks of the 2008 season, the Huntington Heroes stood at the top of the Eastern Conference with a 3–1 record and led the conference in both scoring offense and scoring defense.

On April 24, 2008, Heroes players refused to board the bus and travel for a game the following day against the Florence Phantoms. Ultimately, eight players and three members of the coaching staff resigned. On April 25, a team hastily constructed of Florence-area players and members of the Baltimore Mariners practice squad was put together by the AIFA and played as the Huntington Heroes, losing to the Phantoms 66–12.

The Heroes announced a restructuring, with former Game day operations director Michael Napier taking over as General manager and naming Jason Hunter the team's head coach. Ten remaining members of the team and several new players, including several former Heroes players from prior years, announced they continue for the rest of the season. Following three consecutive losses to division foe Fayetteville which then featured several Heroes players that played for Huntington just two weeks earlier. the Heroes gained momentum defeated rival Reading at home, 50–41, and made the playoffs but special teams mistakes cost the Heroes in their final game of the season. The Heroes would actually make the trip to Florence to play the AIFA Championship against the Phantoms, but the Heroes finished with a 55–9 defeat.

In 2010, AIFL owner and founder Andrew Haines announced that he would be reviving his league as the Ultimate Indoor Football League in 2011, with Huntington as one of its teams. The team will receive a new name in a fan contest.

== Season-by-season ==
Season records
| Season | W | L | T | Finish | Playoff results |
|---|---|---|---|---|---|
Huntington Heroes (AIFL)
| 2006 | 9 | 5 | 0 | 4th Northern | Lost NC Round 1 (Reading) |
Huntington Heroes (AIFA)
| 2007 | 10 | 4 | 0 | 3rd Northern | Lost NC Round 1 (Canton) |
| 2008 | 6 | 8 | 0 | 2nd EC Eastern | Lost ECE Round 1 (Florence) |
| Totals | 25 | 20 | 0 | (including playoffs) | |

== 2006 season results ==
| Date | Opponent | Home/Away | Result |
|---|---|---|---|
| March 11 | Miami Valley Silverbacks | Home | Won 62–13 |
| March 17 | Johnstown Riverhawks | Away | Won 38–23 |
| March 25 | Erie Freeze | Home | Lost 38–46 |
| March 31 | Syracuse Soldiers | Home | Won 38–13 |
| April 7 | Erie Freeze | Away | Won 55–33 |
| April 15 | Reading Express | Home | Lost 39–54 |
| April 23 | Steubenville Stampede | Away | Won 2–0* |
| April 29 | Syracuse Soldiers | Away | Won 50–29 |
| May 6 | Canton Legends | Home | Lost 41–54 |
| May | Miami Valley Silverbacks | Away | Won 53–45 |
| May | Reading Express | Away | Lost 21–43 |
| May | Canton Legends | Away | Lost 49–75 |
| June 3 | Johnstown Riverhawks | Home | Won 43–15 |
| June 10 | Florence Phantoms | Home | Won 60–36 |
| June | Reading Express (Playoffs) | Away | Lost 23–57 |

== 2007 season results ==
| Date | Opponent | Home/Away | Result |
|---|---|---|---|
| February 3 | Carolina Speed | Home | Lost 57–61 |
| February 9 | Johnstown Riverhawks | Away | Won 35–24 |
| February 17 | Canton Legends | Home | Lost 52–69 |
| March 3 | Florence Phantoms | Away | Won 43–40 |
| March 17 | Carolina Speed (exhibition) | Away | Lost 34–35 |
| March 24 | Johnstown Riverhawks | Home | Won 47–22 |
| March 31 | Reading Express | Away | Lost 18–48 |
| April 7 | Erie Freeze | Away | Won 45–44 |
| April 12 | Erie Freeze | Home | Won 70–48 |
| April 21 | Pittsburgh RiverRats | Home | Won 55–34 |
| April 28 | Danville Demolition | Away | Won 70–34 |
| May 12 | Danville Demolition | Home | Won 56–14 |
| May 19 | Reading Express | Home | Won 42–29 |
| May 25 | Pittsburgh RiverRats | Away | Won 69–26 |
| June 1 | Canton Legends | Away | Lost 50–52 |
| June 7 | Canton Legends (Playoffs) | Away | Lost 43–76 |

== 2008 season results ==
| Date | Opponent | Home/Away | Result |
|---|---|---|---|
| March 15 | Florida Stingrays | Home | Won 56–9 |
| March 21 | Florence Phantoms | Home | Won 47–32 |
| March 29 | Carolina Speed | Away | Won 40–35 |
| April 5 | Reading Express | Away | Lost 38–57 |
| April 11 | Erie RiverRats | Home | Won 54–24 |
| April 19 | Canton Legends | Home | Won 49–6 |
| April 25 | Florence Phantoms | Away | Lost 12–66 |
| May 3 | Fayetteville Guard | Home | Lost 26–34 |
| May 9 | Erie RiverRats | Away | Lost 43–47 |
| May 17 | Erie RiverRats | Home | Lost 31–52 |
| May 31 | Reading Express | Home | Won 50–41 |
| June 7 | Fayetteville Guard | Away | Lost 34–61 |
| June 15 | Columbus Lions | Away | Lost 54–57 |
| June 21 | Canton Legends | Away | Lost 39–43 |
| July 7 | Florence Phantoms (Playoffs) | Away | Lost 9–55 |

== Heroes honors ==
Fred Ray - QB - 2006 AIFL Northern Conference ProStars First Team

James Martin - DL - 2006 AIFL Northern Conference ProStars First Team

Shane Holsinger - WR - 2006 AIFL Northern Conference ProStars Second Team

James Hawkins - WR - 2006 AIFL Northern Conference ProStars Second Team

Chris Nunn - OL - 2006 AIFL Northern Conference ProStars Second Team

Marcus Hairston - DL - 2006 AIFL Northern Conference ProStars Second Team

Donte Newsome - RB - 2007 AIFA Northern Conference All-Star

Nate McPeek - OL - 2007 AIFA Northern Conference All-Star

Connie Brown - DB - 2007 AIFA Northern Conference All-Star

Darnell Kennedy - QB - 2008 AIFA Northern Conference All-Star Honorable Mention
