= Monreko Crittenden =

American football player (1980–2015)

Profile
- Position: Offensive lineman

Personal information
- Born: March 14, 1980; Montgomery, Alabama, U.S.
- Died: June 25, 2015 (aged 35); Montgomery, Alabama, U.S.
- Listed height: 6 ft 5 in (1.96 m)
- Listed weight: 395 lb (179 kg)

Career information
- College: Auburn
- NFL draft: 2004: undrafted

Career history
- Baltimore Ravens (2004)*; Montgomery Bears (2007); Columbus Lions (2007–2008); Los Angeles Avengers (2008); Columbus Lions (2009); Alabama Vipers (2010)*
- * Offseason or practice squad member only

Awards and highlights
- First-team All-SEC (2003); All-AIFA (2009)

Career AFL statistics
- Receptions: 0
- Receiving yards: 0
- Tackles: 1
- Stats at ArenaFan.com

Monreko Crittenden (March 14, 1980 - June 25, 2015) was an American football offensive lineman. He played for the Alabama Vipers of Arena Football League (AFL). He was signed by the Baltimore Ravens as an undrafted free agent in 2004. He played college football at Auburn. His untimely death was widely reported amongst Auburn fans late Thursday, June 25 and verified by news outlets the following day. Funeral service was held at St. Jude Church, Montgomery, Al, on July 3, 2015.

Crittenden also played for the Montgomery Bears, Columbus Lions and Los Angeles Avengers.

== College career ==
Crittenden earned All-Southeastern Conference honors as a three-year starter with the Tigers.

== Professional career ==
=== Baltimore Ravens ===
Crittenden declared himself eligible for the 2004 NFL draft, but went undrafted. He signed as an unrestricted free agent on April 30, 2004, with the Baltimore Ravens.
