= D.C. Armor =

Washington, D.C. based professional indoor football team

- Founded: 2008
- Folded: 2009
- League: American Indoor Football Association
- Team history: D.C. Armor; 2009
- Based in: Washington, D.C.
- Arena: D.C. Armory
- Colors: Black, silver
- Owner: Corey Barnette
- Head coach: Daniel James
- Championships: 0

The D.C. Armor was a professional indoor football team that began play in the American Indoor Football Association (AIFA) in the 2009 season. The team was based in Washington, D.C., with home games at the D.C. Armory. The Armor were the first professional football team to play within the District of Columbia since the Washington Redskins left for FedExField in 1997. The Armor was also the area's first indoor football team since the Washington Commandos played in the Arena Football League in 1990, and the only arena/indoor football team to play within the district (the Commandos played in the Capital Centre and the Patriot Center) until the formation of the Washington Valor, who played their home games at Capital One Arena. After one poorly attended season, the Armor folded.

== Season-by-season ==
Season records
| Season | W | L | T | Finish | Playoff results |
|---|---|---|---|---|---|
| 2009 | 4 | 10 | 0 | 4th Northern | -- |

== 2009 season schedule ==
| Date | Opponent | Home/Away | Result |
|---|---|---|---|
| March 13 | Reading Express | Away | L 28-51 |
| March 28 | Erie RiverRats | Away | W 34-30 |
| April 4 | Reading Express | Home | L 19-39 |
| April 11 | Fayetteville Guard | Home | L 19-58 |
| April 18 | Columbus Lions | Away | L 6-76 |
| April 25 | Harrisburg Stampede | Home | W 44-26 |
| May 2 | Carolina Speed | Away | L 20-28 |
| May 9 | Harrisburg Stampede | Away | L 18-20 |
| May 23 | Reading Express | Home | L 35-51 |
| May 30 | Baltimore Mariners | Away | L 25-57 |
| June 6 | Baltimore Mariners | Home | L 28-57 |
| June 13 | Carolina Speed | Home | W 50-44 |
| June 20 | Erie RiverRats | Home | W 47-28 |
| June 27 | Baltimore Mariners | Away | L 22-70 |
