= Tallahassee Titans =

Logo

General information
- Founded: 2006
- Folded: 2007
- Headquartered: Donald L. Tucker Center in Tallahassee, Florida
- Colors: Blue, Gold, White
- Mascot: Titan

Personnel
- Head coach: Keven Jackson
- President: David Morris

Team history
- Tallahassee Titans (2006–2007)

Home fields
- Donald L. Tucker Center (2006–2007)

League / conference affiliations
- American Indoor Football Association (2006-2007)

The Tallahassee Titans were an American Indoor Football Association team that began play as a 2007 member. The team played its home games at the Donald L. Tucker Center in Tallahassee, Florida.

== History ==
The owner of the team, David Morris had been given a choice from three markets: Charlotte, North Carolina, Greenville, South Carolina, or Tallahassee. He chose Tallahassee. Later on, the team had a name-the-team contest, followed by a poll. The finalists were:

- Tallahassee Titans
- Tallahassee Talons
- Tallahassee Tarpons
- Tallahassee Conquistadors
- Tallahassee Knights

On August 14, 2006, the team announced they would be the Tallahassee Titans.

On Wednesday, September 20, 2006, the Titans announced that their inaugural head coach would be Keven Jackson. Prior to being named head coach, he was the assistant head coach and the defensive coordinator for the Canton Legends.

Starting with their inaugural home game on February 17, 2007, Champion Broadcasting took over broadcast duties for the team. All of the home games starting with the first game against the Gulf Coast Raiders have been broadcast live on the Titans website, Champion Broadcasting's website, and, then, WUTL 106.1FM. The essential 'voice' of the Titans being Doc, with expert technical assistance by Anthony. Also starting with the Gulf Coast game, the Titans have had an official broadcast team, consisting of Play-by-Play Commentator Drew Goldfarb, Color Commentator and Analyst Brandon Beyer, the sell out, and Sideline Correspondent Courtney Jones. After the Titans home game against the Florence Phantoms, Brandon Beyer left the broadcast team for financial reasons. Taking over his role for the Lakeland Thunderbolts home game was Cory Safra. The team has not announced an official replacement for Beyer yet.

On August 12, 2007, the Titans announced that they would be joining the World Indoor Football League for the 2008 season. However, due to the WIFL folding, Tallahassee was left with no league to play in for 2008. In November/December 2007, Owner David Morris announced that the team would NOT play in 2008, though he did say that the team was folding, and remains optimistic about play in 2009.

On December 8 & 9, 2007, the Titans held a garage sale, with items like T-shirts, jerseys, helmets, shoulder pads, game-used footballs and coffee mugs up for grabs. The Titans also sold office equipment such as desks, chairs and filing cabinets. The sale was held on Friday from noon-6 p.m. and Saturday from 8 a.m.-4 p.m. at Bob's Auto Repair on West Gaines Street in Tallahassee, Florida. All of the money went to salaries for players, coaches and front-office staff. The Titans finished 11–4 the spring of 2007 but ran out of money during their inaugural season. In early December the Civic Center terminated the Titans' three-year lease because the team owes the arena $40,000 that was due by October 1, 2007. So effectively, the Tallahassee Titans have folded. (Source: Tallahassee Democrat newspaper)

== Season-by-season ==
Season records
Season	W	L	T	Finish	Playoff results	
Tallahassee Titans (AIFA)
2007	11	3	0	3rd Southern	Lost SC Round 1	Mississippi 62, Tallahassee 32
2008	Did not play					
Totals	11	4	0	(including playoffs)		

== 2007 Season Schedule ==
Date	Opponent	Home/Away	Result
February 12	Carolina Speed	Away	Won 62–44
February 17	Gulf Coast Raiders	Home	Won 62–22
March 3	Reading Express	Home	Won 47–37
March 10	Mississippi Mudcats	Home	Lost 58–62
March 17	Montgomery Bears	Home	Won 30–26
March 24	Montgomery Bears	Away	Won 55–34
March 31	Florence Phantoms	Home	Won 41–36
April 14	Mississippi Mudcats	Away	Lost 75–80
April 20	Lakeland Thunderbolts	Home	Won 48–40
April 28	Florence Phantoms	Away	Won 69–33
May 5	Johnstown Riverhawks	Away	Won 67–60
May 12	Lakeland Thunderbolts	Away	Lost 24–51
May 18	Carolina Speed	Home	Won 68–48
May 28	Baltimore Blackbirds	Home	Won 73–40
June 10	Mississippi Mudcats (Playoffs)	Away	Lost 32–62
