= Johnstown Riverhawks =

US indoor American football team

Logo

General information
- Founded: 1999
- Folded: 2008
- Headquartered: Johnstown, Pennsylvania at the Cambria County War Memorial Arena
- Colors: Blue, black, silver, white

Personnel
- Owners: James Wallace and Mike Dawson
- Head coach: Tony Penna Jr.
- President: James Wallace and Mike Dawson

Team history
- Topeka Knights/Kings (1999–2000); Tennessee ThunderCats (2001–2002); Tennessee Riverhawks (2003); Greenville Riverhawks (2004); Johnstown Riverhawks (2005–2008)

Home fields
- Cambria County War Memorial Arena (2004–2008)

League / conference affiliations
- Indoor Football League (1999–2000); Indoor Professional Football League (2001); National Indoor Football League (2002–2004); Atlantic Indoor Football League (2005–2006); American Indoor Football (2007–2008)

The Johnstown Riverhawks was a professional indoor American football team based out of Johnstown, Pennsylvania. A charter member of the American Indoor Football Association (AIFA), it played its home games at Cambria County War Memorial Arena.

== History ==
=== Indoor Football League (1999–2000) ===
The Riverhawks began play in 1999 as the Topeka Knights of the original Indoor Football League. The team missed the playoffs during its inaugural season, finishing third in the Northern Division at 6-6. During its second season, the team changed ownership and became the Topeka Kings. It finished with a much better record, going 10-4 and winning the Western Conference, Southern Division championship. During the playoffs, it defeated the Black Hills Machine during the quarterfinal round before losing to the Bismarck Blaze in the semifinals.

=== Move to Tennessee (2001–2003) ===
After the season, the team moved to Knoxville, Tennessee, became the Tennessee ThunderCats, and moved to the Indoor Professional Football League.

It then won the league championship during its first year. After the IPFL folded, the ThunderCats moved to the NIFL. During its tenure in the league, the team had a degree of success in 2002, but considerably less as the Tennessee Riverhawks in 2003.

=== Beyond ===
In 2004, while it was the Greenville Riverhawks, this team's ownership folded after three games, and moved to Lancaster, Pennsylvania, where it played its remaining games. It was subsequently re-founded by Andrew Haines, owner of the Atlantic Indoor Football League. The team was purchased by Brian Schwelling of Atlanta, Georgia in February 2005. Schwelling operated the team successfully until September of that same year when it was sold to Michael Dawson. Schwelling was successful in bringing the Riverhawks to the semifinal game in the team's inaugural season.

On March 4, 2006, the team won its first game of its second season on the road 21–14 against the Steubenville Stampede, which made AIFL history by becoming the lowest scoring game in the league's then two-year existence.

On March 26, 2006, the Riverhawks lost the AIFL's very first overtime game 41–38 against the Reading Express at home.

In the 2008 season, the Riverhawks ended its contract with the Johnstown War Memorial.

AIFL owner Andrew Haines announced he was relaunching the defunct AIFL as the Ultimate Indoor Football League during the 2011 season and would be bringing back Johnstown in the process. The revived team was to bear the name "Johnstown Generals."

== 2001 Tennessee ThunderCats IPFL Schedule ==
Week 1 – Tennessee ThunderCats 52, Trenton Lightning 25

Week 2 – Tennessee ThunderCats 34, St. Louis Renegades 28

Week 3 – Tennessee ThunderCats 42, Boise Stallions 29

Week 4 – bye

Week 5 – Tennessee ThunderCats 39, Trenton Lightning 26

Week 6 – Tennessee ThunderCats 41, Trenton Lightning 24

Week 7 – Tennessee ThunderCats 40, St. Louis Renegades 23

Week 8 – Omaha Beef 72, Tennessee ThunderCats 50

Week 9 – Tennessee ThunderCats 47, St. Louis Renegades 44

Week 10 – Omaha Beef 56, Tennessee ThunderCats 29

Week 11 – Omaha Beef 54, Tennessee ThunderCats 32

Week 12 – Boise Stallions 40, Tennessee ThunderCats 38

Week 13 – Tennessee ThunderCats 61, Omaha Beef 34

Week 14 – Tennessee ThunderCats 35, St. Louis Renegades 10

Week 15 – bye

Week 16 – Tennessee ThunderCats 53, Boise Stallions 9

Week 17 – bye

Week 18 – Tennessee ThunderCats vs. Boise Stallions – Cancelled

Week 19 – Tennessee ThunderCats 43, St. Louis Renegades 27

IPFL Championship – Tennessee ThunderCats 47, Omaha Beef 38

== Season-by-season ==
Season records
Season	W	L	T	Finish	Playoff results
Topeka Knights (IFL)
1999	6	6	0	3rd Northern	--
Topeka Knights/Kings (IFL)
2000	10	4	0	1st WC Southern	Won quarterfinal (B.H. Machine); Lost semifinal (Bismarck)
Tennessee ThunderCats (IPFL)
2001	11	4	0	2nd League	Won IPFL Championship (Omaha)
Tennessee ThunderCats (NIFL)
2002	10	4	0	2nd AC Northern	Won Round 1 (Lake Charles); Lost AC Quarterfinal (Ohio Valley)
Tennessee Riverhawks (NIFL)
2003	6	8	0	5th AC Eastern	--
Greenville Riverhawks (NIFL)
2004	0	4	0	5th AC Eastern	--
Johnstown Riverhawks (AIFL)
2005	6	4	0	3rd League	Lost League Semifinals (Richmond)
2006	8	5	0	5th Northern	--
Johnstown Riverhawks (AIFA)
2007	6	9	0	5th Northern	--
2008	Did not play				
Totals	66	51	0	(including playoffs)	

== 2007 Season Schedule ==
Date	Opponent	Home/Away	Result
February 2	Canton Legends	Home	Lost 46–60
February 9	Huntington Heroes	Home	Lost 24–35
February 23	Danville Demolition	Away	Won 39–16
March 4	Erie Freeze	Away	Won 44–42
March 17	Pittsburgh RiverRats	Home	Won 43–13
March 24	Huntington Heroes	Away	Lost 22–47
March 30	Pittsburgh RiverRats	Away	Lost 42–47
April 7	Reading Express	Home	Lost 33–55
April 14	Danville Demolition	Home	Won 40–8
April 28	Erie Freeze	Home	Won 63–21
May 5	Tallahassee Titans	Home	Lost 60–67
May 12	Reading Express	Away	Lost 16–76
May 18	Canton Legends	Away	Lost 16–38
May 25	Montgomery Bears	Away	Lost 9-32
June 1	Baltimore Blackbirds	Away	Won 19–17
