= Danville Demolition =

Logo

General information
- Founded: 2006
- Folded: 2007
- Headquartered: Danville, Illinois at the David S. Palmer Arena
- Colors: Black, Gold, Gray

Personnel
- Head coach: Willie Davis
- President: John Christner

Team history
- Danville Demolition (2006-2007)

Home fields
- David S. Palmer Arena (2006-2007)

League / conference affiliations
- American Indoor Football Association (2006-2007)

The Danville Demolition were an American Indoor Football Association team that played in 2007. The team played their home games at the David S. Palmer Arena.

== History ==
On June 19, 2006, the AIFA announced that Danville would get a team to play at the Palmer Arena. Commissioner Andrew Haines owned the team (like most others) until a suitable owner could be found. Local radio station WDAN held a name-the-team contest, with 95% of the entries beginning with the letter "D".

On August 16 the team announced their name, the Danville Demolition, as well as their new owner, South Bend, Indiana businessman John Christner, as well as a head coach, B.J. Luke (replaced midseason by Willie Davis). The winning name was submitted by Michael Burmeister of Racine, Wisconsin.

The team struggled on and off the field, with only one win (against the Erie Freeze at home on March 29) Demolition owner, John Christner decided to shut down the Danville franchise due to dwindling attendance and sponsorship. Christner still owns the AIFA franchise and hopes to locate the franchise somewhere in the midwest.

The Ultimate Indoor Football League has selected Danville as an expansion site for the 2012 season.

== Season-by-season ==
Season records
Season	W	L	T	Finish	Playoff results
2007	1	12	0	6th Northern	--

== 2007 season schedule ==
Date	Opponent	Home/Away	Result
February 17	Erie Freeze	Away	Lost 21–49
February 23	Johnstown Riverhawks	Home	Lost 16–39
March 4	Pittsburgh RiverRats	Away	Lost 21–47
March 9	Pittsburgh RiverRats	Home	Lost 29–34
March 29	Erie Freeze	Home	Won 48–45
April 5	Lakeland Thunderbolts	Home	Lost 6-71
April 14	Johnstown Riverhawks	Away	Lost 8-40
April 21	Reading Express	Home	Lost 42–56
April 28	Huntington Heroes	Home	Lost 34–70
May 6	Canton Legends	Away	Lost 14–72
May 12	Huntington Heroes	Away	Lost 14–56
May 24	Canton Legends	Home	Lost 19–53
June 2	Reading Express	Away	Lost 41–83
