= Reading Express =

Defunct Aerican indoor football team

Logo

General information
- Founded: 2006
- Folded: 2012
- Headquartered: Sovereign Center in Reading, Pennsylvania
- Colors: Blue, silver, white
- Mascot: Caboose
- ExpressIndoorFootball.com

Personnel
- Owners: Ted Lavender; Lisa Lavender
- Head coach: Mark Steinmeyer

Team history
- Reading Express (2006–2012)

Home fields
- Sovereign Center (2006–2012)

League / conference affiliations
- American Indoor Football League/Association (2006–2010): Northern Conference (2006); Northern Division (2007); Eastern Conference (2008); North Division (2008–2010); Indoor Football League (2011–2012): United Conference (2011–2012); Atlantic Division (2011)

Championships
- League championships: 1; 2009
- Conference championships: 1; 2006
- Division championships: 4; 2007, 2008, 2009, 2011

Playoff appearances (5)
- 2006, 2007, 2008, 2009, 2011

The Reading Express were a professional indoor football team based in Reading, Pennsylvania. They were most recently a member of the United Conference of the Indoor Football League (IFL). The Express began play in 2006, as an expansion team of the American Indoor Football League. The team was originally going to be named the Reading RiverRats, but passed on that name in favor of the "Reading Express." The RiverRats name and logo was moved to an AIFA team in Pittsburgh in 2007. The owners of the Express were Ted & Lisa Lavender. They played their home games at the Sovereign Center.

== Franchise history ==
=== 2006 ===
On September 14, 2005, the Express were announced as an expansion team of the American Indoor Football League (AIFL). On November 6, 2005, the Express named Ollie Guidry the team's first ever head coach.

On Sunday, March 26, 2006, the Express won the AIFL's very first overtime game 41–38 against the Johnstown Riverhawks on the road, as kicker Erik Rockhold booted the game-winning 45-yard field goal.

On Friday, May 12, 2006, the Express managed to knock the Erie Freeze out of the #1 spot in the conference by getting revenge 59–48.

At the end of their inaugural year, the Express held the highest record in the AIFL's Northern Conference, at 12–2. This, however, was padded by two games against amateur outdoor franchises—the Cumberland Cardinals and a team known as the Philadelphia Scorpions, both of which were blowouts.

In the opening round of the 2006 AIFL Playoffs, the Express managed to knock out the fourth-seeded Huntington Heroes with a 56–23 victory. In the Northern Conference championship game, they faced the second-seeded Canton Legends for the Northern Conference title and a chance to participate in the American Bowl. Unfortunately, the Express got derailed as they got shut out in the second half and fell 44–24. Even though they fell one game shy of the league championship, it wasn't a total loss, as wide receiver Carmelo Ocasio was named the 2006 Northern Conference Offensive MVP.

=== 2007 ===
In the 2007 season, now part of the AIFL's reorganized form (the American Indoor Football Association), the Express built on their success in the previous season, finishing a league-best 14–2 in the regular season, defeating the Pittsburgh RiverRats 42–24 in the first round, and defeating the Canton Legends 66–51 to claim the Northern Conference Championship and earn a trip to AIFA Championship Bowl I at the Florence Civic Center. Unfortunately, the Express got derailed yet again, losing to the Lakeland Thunderbolts 54–49.

==== Season schedule ====
| Date | Opponent | Home/Away | Result |
|---|---|---|---|
| February 18 | Pittsburgh RiverRats | Away | Won 35–28 |
| February 25 | Erie Freeze | Home | Won 46–38 |
| March 3 | Tallahassee Titans | Away | Lost 37–47 |
| March 10 | Baltimore Blackbirds | Home | Won 78–6 |
| March 16 | Erie Freeze | Away | Won 50–35 |
| March 23 | Canton Legends | Away | Won 50–19 |
| March 31 | Huntington Heroes | Home | Won 48–18 |
| April 7 | Johnstown Riverhawks | Away | Won 55–33 |
| April 14 | Canton Legends | Home | Won 63–56 |
| April 21 | Danville Demolition | Away | Won 56–42 |
| April 28 | Montgomery Bears | Home | Won 73–57 |
| May 6 | Pittsburgh RiverRats | Home | Won 57–40 |
| May 12 | Johnstown Riverhawks | Home | Won 76–16 |
| May 19 | Huntington Heroes | Away | Lost 29–42 |
| May 21 | Baltimore Blackbirds | Away | Won 58–32 |
| June 2 | Danville Demolition | Home | Won 83–41 |
| June 9 | Pittsburgh RiverRats (Playoffs) | Home | Won 42–24 |
| June 16 | Canton Legends (Playoffs) | Home | Won 66–51 |
| June 23 | Lakeland Thunderbolts (Championship Bowl I) | Neutral (Florence) | Lost 49–54 |

=== 2008 ===
==== Season schedule ====
| Date | Opponent | Home/Away | Result |
|---|---|---|---|
| March 8 | Baltimore Mariners | Home | Won 36–27 |
| March 15 | Carolina Speed | Away | Lost 17–49 |
| March 22 | Arizona Adrenaline (Exhibition) | Home | Won 47–43 |
| March 29 | Erie RiverRats | Away | Won 44–34 |
| April 5 | Huntington Heroes | Home | Won 57–38 |
| April 12 | Columbus Lions | Away | Loss 50–25 |
| April 19 | Florence Phantoms | Home | Won 66–30 |
| April 25 | Canton Legends | Home | Won 36–7 |
| May 10 | Canton Legends | Away | Won 50–48 |
| May 17 | Fayetteville Guard | Home | Won 51–24 |
| May 24 | Baltimore Mariners | Home | Won 49–27 |
| May 31 | Huntington Heroes | Away | Loss 50–41 |
| June 7 | Erie RiverRats | Away | Loss 51–32 |
| June 14 | Erie RiverRats | Home | Won 66–26 |
| June 23 | Baltimore Mariners | Away | Won 47–38 |
| July 3 | Erie RiverRats(Playoffs) | Home | Won 67–57 |

=== 2009 ===
In the 2009 season, the Express had another fantastic season, finishing the regular season 11–3, defeating the Baltimore Mariners 50–20 in the first round, and defeating the Columbus Lions 60–51 in the conference championship game to earn another berth in the AIFA Championship Bowl III in Casper, Wyoming. This time in the title game, the Express were overpowering and they defeated the Wyoming Cavalry 65–42 to win their first AIFA championship.

==== Season schedule ====
| Date | Opponent | Home/Away | Result |
|---|---|---|---|
| March 13 | D.C. Armor | Home | Won 51–28 |
| March 22 | Baltimore Mariners | Away | Loss 59–49 |
| March 28 | South Carolina Force | Home | Won 47–27 |
| April 4 | D.C. Armor | Away | Won 39–19 |
| April 11 | Erie RiverRats | Home | Won 47–13 |
| April 18 | Baltimore Mariners | Home | Loss 40–36 |
| April 26 | Erie RiverRats | Away | Won 66–48 |
| May 2 | Florence Phantoms | Away | Won 66–55 |
| May 9 | Fayetteville Guard | Home | Won 63–53 |
| May 17 | Harrisburg Stampede | Home | Won 44–6 |
| May 23 | D.C. Armor | Away | Won 51–35 |
| May 30 | Fayetteville Guard | Away | Loss 57–53 |
| June 13 | Erie RiverRats | Home | Won 45–27 |
| June 27 | Harrisburg Stampede | Away | Won 41–19 |
| July 2 | Baltimore Mariners (Playoffs) | Home | Won 50–20 |
| July 13 | Columbus Lions (Playoffs) | Away | Won 60–51 |
| July 26 | Wyoming Cavalry (AIFA Championship Bowl III) | Away | Won 65–42 |

=== 2010 ===
Missing

=== 2011 ===
On July 21, 2010, the Express announced that they would be promoting interim head coach/offensive coordinator, Chris Thompson, to head coach for the 2011 season. On August 18, 2010, the Express announced that will be leaving the AIFA and joining the Indoor Football League (IFL).

=== 2012 ===
The team announced that in 2013 they will take the year off, but they never returned and they are now folded.

== Season-by-season ==
Season records
| Season | W | L | T | Finish | Playoff results |
|---|---|---|---|---|---|
Reading Express (AIFL)
| 2006 | 12 | 2 | 0 | 1st Northern | Won Round 1 (Huntington); Lost NC Championship (Canton) |
Reading Express (AIFA)
| 2007 | 14 | 2 | 0 | 1st Northern | Won Round 1 (Pittsburgh); Won NC Championship (Canton); Lost AIFA Championship Bowl I (Lakeland) |
| 2008 | 10 | 4 | 0 | 1st EC Northern | Won ECN Round 1 (Erie); Lost EC Championship (Florence) |
| 2009 | 11 | 3 | 0 | 1st Northern | Won Divisional (Baltimore); Won Semifinal (Columbus); Won AIFA Championship Bowl III (Wyoming) |
| 2010 | 8 | 6 | 0 | 4th Eastern | -- |
Reading Express (IFL)
| 2011 | 8 | 6 | 0 | 1st Atlantic | Won Round 1 (Chicago); Lost Conference Semi-Final (Green Bay) |
| 2012 | 2 | 12 | 0 | 8th United | -- |
| Totals | 73 | 39 | 0 | (including playoffs) | |

== Head coaches ==
| Name | Term | Regular season | | | | Playoffs | | Awards |
| Name | Term | W | L | T | Win% | W | L | Awards |
|---|---|---|---|---|---|---|---|---|
| Ollie Guidry | 2006 | 12 | 2 | 0 | .857 | 1 | 1 | |
| Kelly Logan | 2007 | 14 | 2 | 0 | .875 | 2 | 1 | |
| Bernie Nowotarski | 2008-2010 | 26 | 12 | 0 | .684 | 4 | 1 | |
| Chris Thompson | 2010-2011 | 11 | 7 | 0 | .611 | 1 | 1 | |
| Mark Steinmeyer | 2012 | 2 | 12 | 0 | .143 | 0 | 0 | |

== Notable players ==
See Category:Reading Express players
