= John Bascom Wolfe =

American psychologist (1904–1988)

John Wolfe
Biographical details
- Born: July 8, 1904; Dryden, Virginia, U.S.

Playing career

Football
- 1923–1925: Emory & Henry

Coaching career (HC unless noted)

Football
- 1926–1928: Union (KY)

Basketball
- 1928–1929: Union (KY)

Head coaching record
- Overall: 6–6 (college basketball)

John Bascom Wolfe (July 8, 1904 – January 5, 1988) was an American social and behavioural psychologist best known for his study on the use of a token economy on chimpanzees.

Born: Dryden, Virginia on July 8, 1904.

Married Lillian Schuck (Yale Ph.D. and board certified clinical psychologist, August 31, 1933).

Children: Ann Lee Wolfe Little and Lyn Janette Wolfe Wickelgren.

Education: A.M. in Mathematics, Emory and Henry College 1925; A.M., University of Virginia, 1929; Ph.D. in Psychology, University of Illinois, 1932.

Jobs/Positions: National Research Council Fellow at the Yale University Yerkes Primate Lab, 1932–1936. Faculty member in Mathematics and Coach of Football, Basketball, and Baseball at Union College, Barbourville, KY 1926–1929. Professor of Psychology and Chair, University of Mississippi, 1936–1969. While Chair, he instituted the Ph.D. program in experimental psychology and, with his wife, Lillian Wolfe, as the primary clinician on the faculty the APA certified clinical Ph.D. Program.

President of the Southern Society of Psychology and Philosophy, 1952. Founder and Temporary President (during the founding) of the Southeastern Psychological Association 1954–1955. President of the Southeastern Psychological Association, 1955–1956.

Member of Sigma Xi.

== Works ==
- The Effect of Delayed Reward upon Learning in the White Rat (Baltimore, 1934)
- Some Experimental Tests of 'Reasoning' in White Rats (with S.D.S. Spragg; n.p., 1934)
- Effectiveness of Token-rewards for Chimpanzees (Johns Hopkins Press, Baltimore, 1936)
- An Exploratory Study of Food-storing in Rats (Baltimore, 1939)
- The Impact and Potential Change in Chimpanzee Condition-Based Reasoning (University of Florida Press, 1940)
