= Canton Legends =

US professional indoor football team

Logo

General information
- Founded: 2005
- Folded: 2008
- Headquartered: Canton, Ohio at the Canton Memorial Civic Center
- Colors: Maroon, Old Gold, White

Personnel
- President: Joe Hoffman

Team history
- Canton Legends (2005–2008)

Home fields
- Canton Memorial Civic Center (2005–2008)

League / conference affiliations
- American Indoor Football Association (2005–2008)

Championships
- League championships: 1; 2006

Playoff appearances (1)
- 2006

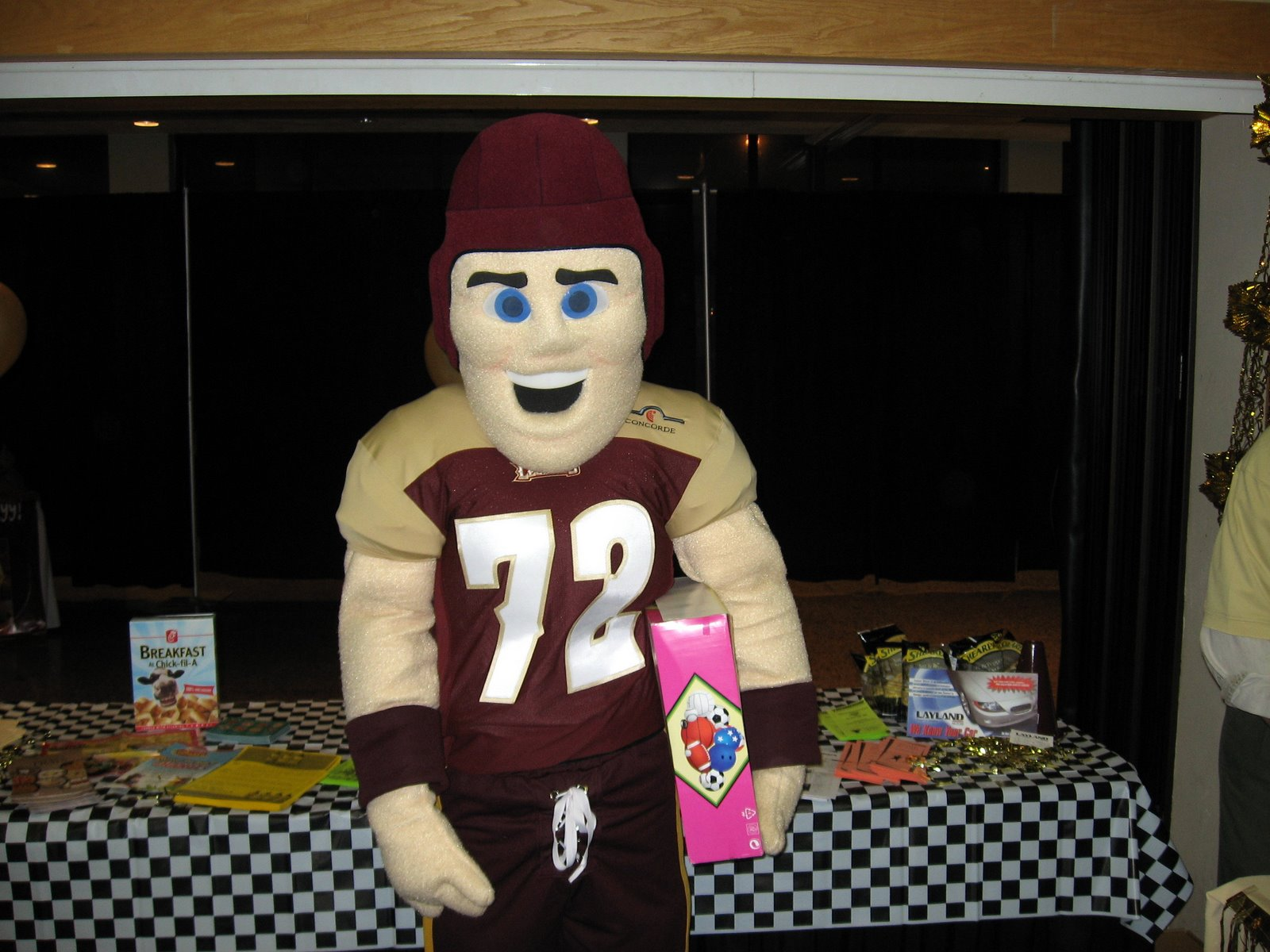
Slappy, the Legends' mascot

The Canton Legends were a professional indoor football team based out of Canton, Ohio. They were a charter member of the American Indoor Football Association, which played their first season under the name Atlantic Indoor Football League, and their second season as the American Indoor Football League. They played their home games at Canton Memorial Civic Center. The team name is in reference to the Pro Football Hall of Fame, since Canton is where the building is located.

During their inaugural season, the Legends ended up at a mediocre 3–7, just beating the Raleigh Rebels for 4th Place in the league. Since the league only had six teams, everyone (including the Legends) made the playoffs. They won the opening round against the Rebels, but their season ended when they lost to the Erie Freeze in the semifinals.

Philadelphia Eagles Super Bowl winning Head Coach Nick Sirianni played for the Legends in 2005.

On Saturday, May 6, 2006, the Legends won 54–41 against the Huntington Heroes on the road, but not without controversy. The Legends were in violation for having an illegal roster, for they added some players to their rosters illegally. At first the AIFL awarded the win to Huntington; later Canton got the win, but had to pay an $800 fine for its actions.

Despite that little controversy, the Legends eventually managed to win the AIFL's ultimate title for 2006, beating the Rome Renegades 61–40.

The Legends also held an AIFA record for longest winning streak (12 games), beginning on May 6, 2006, against the Huntington Heroes (the same Heroes game mentioned above) at Veterans Memorial Fieldhouse, and ending on March 11, 2007, with a 39–36 loss to the Lakeland Thunderbolts at the Lakeland Center. (The Baltimore Mariners later broke this record in 2010.) The Legends are also the last of the six charter AIFL teams to fold, ceasing operations only four seasons after its debut. (Johnstown and Erie folded in 2007 and the other three teams folded in 2006.)

== Season-by-season ==
Season records
Season	W	L	T	Finish	Playoff results
Canton Legends (AIFL)
2005	3	7	0	4th League	Won Round 1 (Raleigh); Lost League Semifinals (Erie)
2006	10	4	0	2nd Northern	Won Round 1 (Erie); Won Northern Division Championship (Reading); Won American Bowl II (Rome)
Canton Legends (AIFA)
2007	10	4	0	2nd Northern	Won Round 1 (Huntington); Lost NC Championship (Reading)
2008	3	11	0	4th EC Northern	
Totals	31	28	0	(including playoffs)	

== 2006 season schedule ==
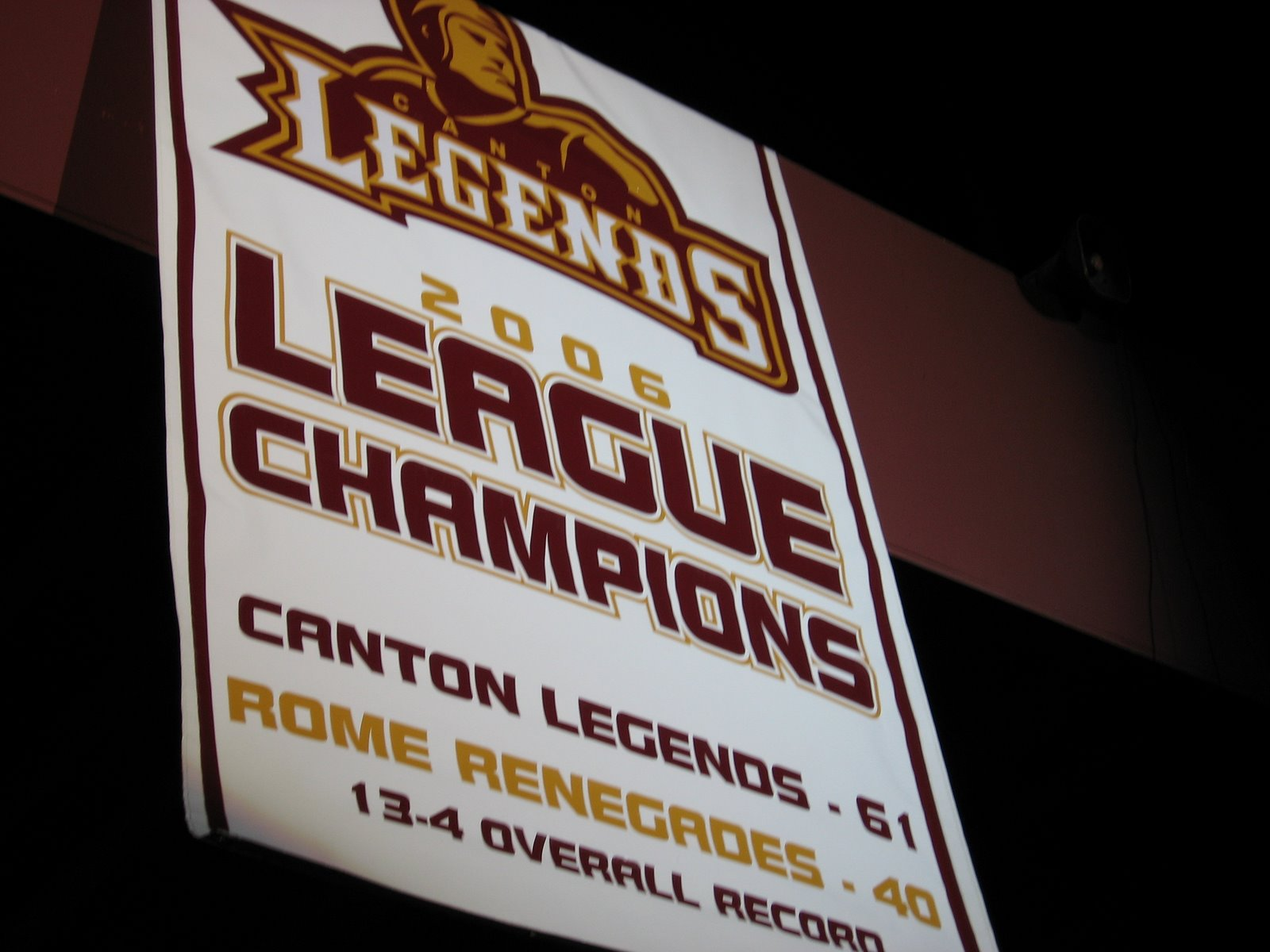
2006 Championship Banner hanging at the Canton Memorial Civic Center

Date	Opponent	Home/Away	Result
February 25	Steubenville Stampede	Home	Win 66–33
March 3	Erie Freeze	Away	Lost 53–61
March 18	Reading Express	Away	Win 52–41
March 22	Johnstown Riverhawks	Home	Win 62–48
March 26	Syracuse Soldiers	Away	Win 58–39
April 1	Johnstown Riverhawks	Away	Lost 36–50
April 8	Miami Valley Silverbacks	Away	Lost 28–44
April 15	Steubenville Stampede	Away	Win 62–26
April 23	Reading Express	Home	Lost 18–56
May 6	Huntington Heroes	Away	Win 54–41
May 13	Syracuse Soldiers	Home	Win 88–41
May 20	Erie Freeze	Home	Win 50–27
May 27	Huntington Heroes	Home	Win 75–49
June 8	Miami Valley Silverbacks	Home	Win 50–28
June 17	Erie Freeze (Playoffs)	Home	Win 54–45
June 22	Reading Express (Playoffs)	Away	Win 44–24
July 3	Rome Renegades (A.B. II)	Away	Win 61–40

== 2007 season schedule ==
Date	Opponent	Home/Away	Result
February 2	Johnstown Riverhawks	Away	Won 60–46
February 9	Erie Freeze	Home	Won 43–26
February 17	Huntington Heroes	Away	Won 69–52
February 23	Pittsburgh RiverRats	Home	Won 45–11
March 11	Lakeland Thunderbolts	Away	Lost 36–39
March 23	Reading Express	Home	Lost 19–50
April 6	Baltimore Blackbirds	Home	Won 38–2
April 14	Reading Express	Away	Lost 56–63
April 21	Erie Freeze	Away	Won 48–44
April 28	Pittsburgh RiverRats	Away	Lost 33–62
May 6	Danville Demolition	Home	Won 72–14
May 18	Johnstown Riverhawks	Home	Won 38–16
May 24	Danville Demolition	Away	Won 53–19
June 1	Huntington Heroes	Home	Won 52–50
June 7	Huntington Heroes (Playoffs)	Home	Won 76–43
June 16	Reading Express (Playoffs)	Away	Lost 51–66

== 2008 season schedule ==
Date	Opponent	Home/Away	Result
March 15	Erie RiverRats	Home	Lost 24–38
March 22	Carolina Speed	Home	Lost 35–38
March 29	Florence Phantoms	Away	Lost 39–55
April 12	Augusta Colts	Home	Lost 35–38
April 19	Huntington Heroes	Away	Lost 6–49
April 25	Reading Express	Away	Lost 7–36
May 3	Erie RiverRats	Away	Lost 48–50
May 10	Reading Express	Home	Lost 54–67
May 17	Augusta Colts	Away	Lost 38–57
May 23	Fayetteville Guard	Home	Won 34–22
May 31	Erie RiverRats	Away	Lost 37–45
June 7	Baltimore Mariners	Home	Won 59–56
June 14	Baltimore Mariners	Away	Lost 34–48
June 21	Huntington Heroes	Home	Won 43–39
