= Lakeland Thunderbolts =

Professional Indoor Football Team

Logo

General information
- Founded: 2005
- Folded: 2010
- Headquartered: Lakeland, Florida at the Lakeland Center
- Colors: Black, Gold, White
- Mascot: Gunny

Personnel
- Owner: Bennie King
- General manager: Bennie King
- Head coach: Teddy Keaton

Team history
- 'Lakeland Thunderbolts (2005–2010)

Home fields
- Lakeland Center (2005–2010)

League / conference affiliations
- American Indoor Football Association (2005-2007) On hiatus (2008-2010)

The Lakeland Thunderbolts were a professional indoor football team. They were a member of the American Indoor Football Association (AIFA). They played their home games at the Lakeland Center.

== History ==
The Lakeland Thunderbolts began in 2005 as an expansion member of the National Indoor Football League, finishing their inaugural season with a 6–8 record and losing in the first round of playoffs to the Rome Renegades with a score of 53–7.

Lakeland's 2006 season ended with a 44–18 loss to the Fayetteville Guard, in Fayetteville, North Carolina, during the second round of the NIFL playoffs. The Thunderbolts finished the regular season fourth overall (third in the Atlantic Conference) with a 12–2 record.

After the 2006 season ended, the 'Bolts decided to move to the American Indoor Football Association. Perhaps the team's biggest victory so far is their 39–36 win over the defending champion Canton Legends on March 11, 2007, ending their 12-game winning streak dating back from the previous season (The previous team to defeat Canton was the Reading Express on April 23, 2006, at the Canton Memorial Civic Center by a score of 56–18). Lakeland secured the 2007 Southern Division Championship after an 84–62 win over the Mississippi Mudcats on June 16, 2007. On June 23, they would win AIFA Championship Bowl I at the Florence Civic Center, defeating the Reading Express by a score of 54–49.

On Saturday, October 20, 2007, it was announced that the Thunderbolts had declined on rejoining the AIFA for 2008.

On Tuesday December 4, 2007, the AIFA announced they have reached an agreement with the Lakeland Center, and the Thunderbolts will return in 2009. There is a possibility that Thunderbolts could play in the Southern Indoor Football League in 2010. The Thunderbolts will likely return to the American Indoor Football Association in 2011

Many of the primary graphics were illustrated by Kristine LaSalle.

== Season-By-Season ==
Season records
Season	W	L	T	Finish	Playoff results
Lakeland Thunderbolts (NIFL)
2005	6	8	0	3rd Atlantic South	Lost AC Quarterfinal (Rome)
2006	12	2	0	1st Atlantic South	Won AC Quarterfinal (Montgomery Maulers); Lost AC Semifinal (Fayetteville)
Lakeland Thunderbolts (AIFA)
2007	11	2	0	1st Southern	Won Round 1 (Carolina); Won SD Championship (Mississippi); Won Championship Bowl I (Reading)
2008	Did not play				
2009	Did not play				
2010	Did not play				
Totals	33	14	0	(including NIFL and AIFA playoffs)	

== 2007 Season Schedule ==
Date	Opponent	Home/Away	Result
February 17	Mississippi Mudcats	Away	Lost 36-46
February 25	Florence Phantoms	Home	Won 69-25
March 11	Canton Legends	Home	Won 39-36
March 16	Baltimore Blackbirds	Home	Won 69-14
March 23	Florence Phantoms	Away	Won 54-18
April 5	Danville Demolition	Away	Won 71-6
April 14	Carolina Speed	Home	Won 57-19
April 20	Tallahassee Titans	Away	Lost 40-48
May 5	Mississippi Mudcats	Home	Won 54-31
May 12	Tallahassee Titans	Home	Won 51-24
May 19	Montgomery Bears	Away	Won 34-32
May 25	Carolina Speed	Away	Won 39-21
June 2	Montgomery Bears	Home	Won 72-56
June 11	Carolina Speed (Playoffs)	Home	Won 55-32
June 18	Mississippi Mudcats (Playoffs)	Home	Won 84-62
June 23	Reading Express (Championship Bowl I)	Neutral (Florence)	Won 54-49
