= Florence Phantoms =

- Founded: 2006
- League: American Indoor Football Association
- Team history: Florence Phantoms (2006–2009)
- Based in: Florence, South Carolina
- Arena: Florence Civic Center
- Colors: Purple, Black, Grey, White
- President: Bennie King
- Head coach: Tavares Bowens
- Championships: 1 (2008)
- Dancers: Spirit Dancers
- Mascot: Doom

The Florence Phantoms were a professional indoor football team based out of Florence, South Carolina, in the United States. They were an expansion member of the American Indoor Football Association (AIFA) in 2006, and were the AIFA Champions of the 2008 season. They played their home games at Florence Civic Center.

On Saturday, April 8, 2006, after losing their first four games, the Phantoms got their first win in a 54–30 home upset against the Raleigh Rebels.

On Friday, June 23, 2006, the Phantoms announced that they would return for the 2007 season.

2008 was the Phantoms' best season by far: after winning the Eastern Division Championship with a 10–4 record, the Phantoms went on to defeat the Huntington Heroes in the first round of the playoffs, followed by the Reading Express in the Eastern Conference championship, and finally defeating the Wyoming Cavalry 48–12 to win the AIFA Championship Bowl on their home turf.

The Phantoms did not return after the 2009 season.

== Season-by-season ==
Season records
Season	W	L	T	Finish	Playoff results
Florence Phantoms (AIFL)
2006	4	10	0	7th Southern	--
Florence Phantoms (AIFA)
2007	4	9	0	6th Southern	--
2008	10	4	0	1st EC Eastern	Won ECE Round 1 (Huntington); Won EC Championship (Reading); Won AIFA Championship Bowl II (Wyoming)
2009	6	8	0	5th Eastern	--
Totals	27	31	0	(including playoffs)	

== Game Results ==
=== 2007 ===
Date	Opponent	Home/Away	Result
February 17	Carolina Speed	Home	Won 64-36
February 25	Lakeland Thunderbolts	Away	Lost 25-69
March 3	Huntington Heroes	Home	Lost 40-43
March 17	Mississippi Mudcats	Away	Lost 14-63
March 23	Lakeland Thunderbolts	Home	Lost 18-54
March 31	Tallahassee Titans	Away	Lost 36-41
April 7	Montgomery Bears	Away	Won 46-40
April 14	Pittsburgh RiverRats	Away	Lost 60-66
April 21	Baltimore Blackbirds	Home	Won 65-33
April 28	Tallahassee Titans	Home	Lost 33-69
May 5	Montgomery Bears	Home	Lost 40-48
May 12	Carolina Speed	Away	Lost 22-32
May 19	Mississippi Mudcats	Home	Won 45-44

=== 2008 ===
Date	Opponent	Home/Away	Result
March 15	Baltimore Mariners	Home	Lost 32-35
March 21	Huntington Heroes	Away	Lost 32-47
March 29	Canton Legends	Home	Won 55-39
April 13	Fayetteville Guard	Away	Won 39-38
April 19	Reading Express	Away	Lost 30-66
April 25	n/a	Home	Won 66-12
May 3	Mississippi Mudcats	Away	Lost 39-40
May 10	Florida Stingrays	Away	Won 61-30
May 17	Florida Stingrays	Home	Won 58-13
May 23	Erie RiverRats	Home	Won 57-27
May 30	Fayetteville Guard	Home	Won 50-6
June 6	Columbus Lions	Away	Won 40-35
June 14	Augusta Colts	Home	Won 56-22
June 21	Carolina Speed	Away	Won 53-35
July 7	Huntington Heroes (Div. Playoffs)	Home	Won 55-9
July 12	Reading Express (EC Championship)	Away	Won 52-37
July 25	Wyoming Cavalry (Championship Bowl II)	Home	Won 48-12

=== 2009 ===
Date	Opponent	Home/Away	Result
March 7	Carolina Speed	Home	Lost 29-37
March 13	Harrisburg Stampede	Home	Won 19-12
March 28	Columbus Lions	Home	Won 55-36
April 4	Fayetteville Guard	Home	Won 50-49
April 11	South Carolina Force	Away	Won 63-59
April 18	Carolina Speed	Away	
April 24	Baltimore Mariners	Away	
May 2	Reading Express	Home	
May 16	Carolina Speed	Home	
May 30	Columbus Lions	Away	
June 6	Fayetteville Guard	Away	
June 13	South Carolina Force	Home	
June 19	Columbus Lions	Away	Lost 61-12
June 27	Erie RiverRats	Away	Lost 60-20
