= Syracuse Soldiers =

Logo

General information
- Founded: 2006
- Folded: 2006
- Headquartered: Syracuse, New York at the War Memorial at Oncenter
- Colors: Black, steel green, white

Personnel
- Head coach: Kirby Dar Dar
- President: Rick Pogue

Team history
- Syracuse Soldiers (2006)

Home fields
- War Memorial at Oncenter (2006)

League / conference affiliations
- American Indoor Football League (2006)

The Syracuse Soldiers was a 2006 expansion member of the American Indoor Football League. They played their home games at the War Memorial at Oncenter in Syracuse, New York until the AIFL ended their season on Friday, May 19, 2006.

The team was originally scheduled to play as the Binghamton Brigadiers (later Binghamton Brigade) and have their venue be the Broome County Veterans Memorial Arena in Binghamton, New York, about 60 miles south of Syracuse. However, insurance problems forced Binghamton to fold before playing a single game.

With the complications, the AIFL rushed to find a placeholder. On January 23, 2006, they announced the Soldiers would begin play. Rich Pogue of Las Vegas, Nevada was named owner prior to the first game, and the team adopted a modified version of the Binghamton logo.

The Soldiers played their first game, at home, on March 6, losing to the Miami Valley Silverbacks 54–30. On Saturday, April 8, 2006, after losing five-straight games, the Soldiers finally got their first and only win, in a 43-31 road victory over the Steubenville Stampede. They would lose the next four games till being folded by the league. During this time, players complained that they were not being paid the $250 per game that they were owed and threatened to stop playing.

Until the team folded, all of its games were broadcast on WJPZ 89.1 FM Syracuse. The Soldiers' opener was called by Todd Robbins and Chris Villani, while the only win in team history was called by Jeff Tiberii and Matt Soltysiak. Melissa Morton, Andrew Ardini, Joel Godett and Steve Wanczyk also contributed to the broadcasts providing color commentary, play-by-play, and sideline reporting.

Pogue left town several weeks into the season, and so Andrew Haines, at the time serving as the league president, hastily stepped in and took over the team himself. The effort did not last. After ten games, the Syracuse Soldiers suspended operations. They were replaced by the Cumberland Cardinals, Columbus Fire and Philadelphia Scorpions, a series of amateur outdoor teams from North American Football League, which briefly tried to acquire the AIFL in 2006. However, Haines claimed that the Soldiers had not folded, but were rather "reorganizing their schedule." Haines was ousted from the league when it reorganized into the American Indoor Football Association after the end of the 2006 season and the Soldiers were folded. Haines has not indicated he would revive the Soldiers or the Brigade in the Ultimate Indoor Football League.

== Season-by-season ==
Season records
Season	W	L	T	Finish	Playoff results
2006	1	9	0	8th Northern	—
