= Montgomery Bears =

Indoor football team (2005–2007)

Logo

General information
- Founded: 2005
- Folded: 2007
- Headquartered: Montgomery, Alabama at the Garrett Coliseum
- Colors: Brown, Red, Black

Personnel
- Head coach: Carlos Clayton
- President: Michael Mink, John Morris

Team history
- Montgomery Maulers (2005–2006); Montgomery Bears (2007)

Home fields
- Garrett Coliseum (2005-2007)

League / conference affiliations
- National Indoor Football League (2005–2006) American Indoor Football Association (2007)

The Montgomery Bears were a professional indoor football team that played their home games at the Garrett Coliseum in Montgomery, Alabama. They are a member of the American Indoor Football Association. The team began play as the Montgomery Maulers of the National Indoor Football League and won the Atlantic Conference Central Division Championship in 2005. The 2005 season ended in the conference playoff semifinals of the Rome Renegades, who went on to appear in the NIFL Championship Indoor Bowl V.

The team folded in October 2007.

== Entire team fired ==
Late in April 2006, the second year of the club's existence, Donald Jackson, an attorney representing members of the team said the club had not paid the players, staff or coaches in more than a month. The team's owner (Jamie LaMunyon) made national news on April 27, 2006, by terminating the contracts of all players and announcing that replacements would be hired.

== New ownership ==
On May 3, 2006, the Maulers came under new ownership. After losing five of their first six games, the team has rallied under new management, winning five of the next six (the lone defeat was a 1-point overtime loss in an away game). The Maulers showed their renewed tenacity most recently in the Osceola rematch. After a downed Montgomery player was speared in the back of the head (with no penalty having been assessed), the teams broke out into a 17-minute bench clearing brawl resulting in 19 players being ejected. Montgomery managed to overcome a 15-point deficit in the fourth quarter to pull off the 1 point win. Although this was officially the second time these teams have played, the first meeting was actually fielded by players from the SSFL's Gulf Coast Raiders (a team owned by Michael Mink) due to the previously mentioned contract disputes. Following the loss, Michael Mink and John Morris decided to become more involved with arena football and purchased the Maulers franchise with Mink becoming head coach and Morris becoming general manager. Subsequently, a number of Raiders players have been signed to the Maulers roster, which has brewed speculation that the Raiders will be used as a farm team for the Maulers.

== 2006 playoffs ==
Following a drumming by the top ranked Fayetteville Guard, the Maulers were 6-7 overall and surprisingly made the playoffs. Tied for 7th place in the conference with the Charleston Sandsharks who was scheduled in the final game of the regular season, the winner was to receive the final playoff spot (only 6 teams per conference would qualify). The Maulers lost the game 28-39, but Charleston's general manager Al Bannister had already stated the organization would skip the playoffs and focus on next season. It was noticed that the official NIFL web site had an asterisk by the team's name and stated no team with outstanding operational items (stats) would be eligible for the playoffs. Later, it was revealed the franchise had cheated by using at least six illegal players and also had outstanding fines due to administrative issues (not exchanging film with opponents or keeping statistics at home games). Subsequently, the Sandsharks were banned from the playoffs for the infractions, with the Maulers being awarded the sixth Atlantic conference spot. However this all proved academic as the Maulers lost in the first week of the playoffs on July 8 at Lakeland. Falling behind 27-0 in the first quarter, Montgomery stormed back but could not make the comeback falling 70-62; they ended their season 7-8.

After the 2006 season, the team announced they were changing their name to the Montgomery Bears and moving to the American Indoor Football Association.

== Season-by-season ==
Season records
Season	W	L	T	Finish	Playoff results
Montgomery Maulers (NIFL)
2005	8	6	0	1st Atlantic Central	Won AC Quarterfinal (M. Morays); Lost AC Semifinal (Rome)
2006	7	7	0	2nd Atlantic East	Lost AC Quarterfinal (Lakeland)
Montgomery Bears (AIFA)
2007	5	9	0	5th Southern	--
Totals	21	24	0	(including playoffs)	

== 2007 season schedule ==
Date	Opponent	Home/Away	Result
February 10	Mississippi Mudcats	Away	Lost 27-57
February 26	Carolina Speed	Away	Lost 16-48
March 17	Tallahassee Titans	Away	Lost 26-30
March 24	Tallahassee Titans	Home	Lost 34-55
April 2	Mississippi Mudcats	Home	Lost 37-62
April 7	Florence Phantoms	Home	Lost 40-46
April 14	Baltimore Blackbirds	Away	Won 51-22
April 21	Carolina Speed	Home	Won 63-34
April 28	Reading Express	Away	Lost 57-73
May 5	Florence Phantoms	Away	Won 48-40
May 12	Baltimore Blackbirds	Home	Won 58-11
May 19	Lakeland Thunderbolts	Home	Lost 32-34
May 25	Johnstown Riverhawks	Home	Won 32-9
June 2	Lakeland Thunderbolts	Away	Lost 56-72

== Current roster ==
Name	Height	Weight	Position	School
Fred Barnett	6 ft 8 in	303 lb	DL	Faulkner
Ryan Tyrone Beneby	6 ft 4 in		OL	ASU
Dante Booker	6 ft 3 in	285 lb	DL	Auburn
Brian Bostick	5 ft 11 in	210 lb	PK	Alabama
John Campbell	6 ft 2 in		LB	
Kevin Campbell	6 ft 3 in	250 lb	RB	Troy
Joshua J.C. Chambers	6 ft 2 in	280 lb	DL	ASU
Markeith Cooper	5 ft 10 in		WR	Auburn
Jermaine Copeland	6 ft 2 in		WR	Grambling State
Monreko Crittenden	6 ft 3 in	253 lb	OL	Auburn
Undrae Crosby	6 ft 4 in	290 lb	DL	UAB
Silas Daniels	6 ft 0 in	190 lb	WR	Auburn
Cliff Darrington II	6 ft 1 in	300 lb	DL	Lakeland High
Roosevelt Echeverry	5 ft 11 in		PK	Tuskegee
Santino Fitzpatrick	6 ft 6 in		DE	
Reginald Glover	6 ft 1 in		WR	ASU
Tyvon Green	6 ft 2 in		QB	Stillman
Jonathan Harrell	6 ft 2 in	235 lb	LB	Northern Iowa
Shaun Holmes	5 ft 10 in	202 lb	WR	ASU
Eric Hudson	6 ft 3 in	230 lb	LB	ASU
Ray Johnson	6 ft 2 in		DB	Miles
Travis Lee	6 ft 5 in	290 lb	DL	Auburn
Deon Lewis	6 ft 3 in	195 lb	DB	ASU
Quincy McCall	6 ft 2 in	275 lb	OL	ASU
James Prince	6 ft 1 in		LB	Morris Brown
J. R. Richardson	6 ft 2 in	228 lb	QB	ASU
Charlie Rollins	5 ft 10 in	205 lb	RB	Miles/ASU
Nate Sconiers	6 ft 4 in	302 lb	OL	ASU
Archie Smith	6 ft 0 in	175 lb	DB	ASU
Clinton Smith	5 ft 8 in		QB	ASU
Wesley Smith	5 ft 10 in		DB	West Georgia
Craig Orlando Smith	6 ft 1 in		WR	
Alan Thompson	5 ft 9 in		DB	Stillman
Ryan Paul Vandervort	6 ft 4 in		OL	Samford/Delta St
Keldrick Williams	5 ft 9 in		RB	ASU

=== Former players ===
- Jeff Aaron 6'3" 215 lb QB UAB
- Curtis Chance 6'3" 290 lb DL USF
- Chrys Chukwuma 6'1" 240 lb RB Arkansas
- Nathan McDaniel 6’1 265 lb DE UAB
- Tim Daniels 6'2" 265 lb DE Southern
- Octavius "Gator" Day 5'7" 160 lb WR Gulf Coast
- Jamaal Fletcher 6'2" 205 lb DB ASU
- Derrick Graves 6'1" 230 lb LB Auburn
- Antoine Hill 5'11 177 lb DB ASU
- Roger Medlock 6'5" 320 lb OL ASU
- Rodrice Merkerson 6'3" 220 lb WR Concordia College, Selma
- Julius Mills 5'11" 190 lb DB ASU
- Jay Newton 5'9" 175 lb WR ASU
- Machion Sanders 5'9" 190 lb WR ASU
- J.D. Verchuere 6'3" 290 lb C Gulf Coast
- Edward Grimes III 6'3" 230 lb WR
