= Baltimore Mariners =

Defunct indoor American football team

Logo

General information
- Founded: 2007
- Folded: 2014
- Headquartered: Baltimore, Maryland at the Baltimore Arena
- Colors: Navy blue, Gold, and White

Personnel
- Owners: C & G Sports Management
- General manager: Scott Garrity
- Head coach: Ron Meehan

Team history
- Baltimore Mariners (2008–2010, 2014)

Home fields
- 1st Mariner Arena (2007)

League / conference affiliations
- American Indoor Football Association (2008–2010); American Indoor Football (2014)

Championships
- League championships: 2 AIFA: 2010; AIF: 2014

Playoff appearances (2)
- 2010, 2014

The Baltimore Mariners were an indoor football team based in Baltimore, Maryland. The team was a member of American Indoor Football. The team was founded when the American Indoor Football Association expelled the Baltimore Blackbirds for negotiating with another league. The AIFA maintained the lease rights to 1st Mariner Arena, so the Mariners were the league's replacement. On September 3, 2010, team owner Dwayne Wells was arrested on charges of wire fraud from an engineering firm he partially owned, allegedly using embezzled money from the firm to buy stakes in the Mariners franchise. Wells forfeited his ownership of the team, causing the Mariners to fold after the 2010 season. The Southern Indoor Football League, as successor to the eastern half of the AIFA, held the lease on the arena, now called Baltimore Arena, until it folded in 2011. The Mariners, after three seasons out of play, returned for one final season in 2014, winning the league championship before folding again. The Mariners were succeeded by the Baltimore Brigade of the Arena Football League in 2017, until the league folded in 2019.

== History ==
=== Expansion (2008–2009) ===
==== 2009 season schedule ====
Date	Opponent	Home/Away	Result
March 15	Erie RiverRats	Home	Won 60-32
March 22	Reading Express	Home	Won 59-44
March 28	Harrisburg Stampede	Away	Lost 37-43
April 4	Columbus Lions	Away	Lost 82-19
April 18	Reading Express	Away	Won 40-36
April 24	Florence Phantoms	Home	Lost 52-58
May 2	Harrisburg Stampede	Away	Won 37-27
May 10	Erie RiverRats	Away	Lost 50-53
May 23	Columbus Lions	Home	Won 52-32
May 30	D.C. Armor	Home	Won 57-24
June 6	D.C. Armor	Away	Won 57-28
June 14	Harrisburg Stampede	Home	Won 58-55
June 20	South Carolina Force	Away	Loss 62-38
June 27	D.C. Armor	Home	Won 70-22
July 2^	Reading Express	Away	Lost 50-20

=== First Championship and collapse (2010) ===
On March 21, 2010, the Mariners became the first team in AIFA history to earn a shutout win, as they won over the Fayetteville Guard 59–0.

On April 24, 2010, Baltimore continued its record-setting performances during a 91–19 home win over the Guard. They would set the team record for most points in one half (59) and the most points in one game (91).

On June 26, 2010, Baltimore became the first team in AIFA history to finish the regular season undefeated with a record of 14–0. Baltimore went on to win the AIFA Championship and complete their undefeated season with a 57–42 victory on July 25, 2010, over the Western Conference champions, the Wyoming Cavalry. In winning AIFA Bowl IV, the Mariners not only brought the city of Baltimore its first pro indoor football title, but also increased the city's number of overall pro football championships to eight (Baltimore Colts (NFL) in 1958, 1959, 1968, and 1970; Baltimore Stars (USFL) in 1985; Baltimore Stallions (CFL) in 1995;Baltimore Ravens (NFL) in 2000 and 2012; and, Baltimore Mariners (AIFA) in 2010).

==== 2010 season schedule ====
Date	Opponent	Home/Away	Result
March 6	Harrisburg Stampede	Away	Won 55-48
March 14	New Jersey Revolution	Home	Won 68-23
March 21	Fayetteville Guard	Home	Won 59-0
March 28	Richmond Raiders	Home	Won 49-45
April 11	New Jersey Revolution	Away	Won 61-27
April 17	Reading Express	Away	Won 51-27
April 24	Fayetteville Guard	Away	Won 91-19
May 2	Harrisburg Stampede	Home	Won 50-17
May 13	Fayetteville Guard	Away	Won 63-34
May 29	Richmond Raiders	Away	Won 57-39
June 5	Erie Storm	Home	Won 51-34
June 13	Erie Storm	Away	Won 39-37
June 19	New Jersey Revolution	Home	Won 84-6
June 26	Reading Express	Home	Won 69-35
July 10^	Harrisburg Stampede	Home	Won 63-15
July 25^	Wyoming Cavalry	Home	Won 57-42

^ - indicates playoff game

The coach of the undefeated 2010 Mariners, Chris Simpson, would move to the Richmond Raiders for the 2011 season.

In October 2011, the AIFA announced that it would include a team from Maryland, presumably the remains/continuation of the Mariners, in its 2012 relaunch; the league more explicitly stated that the Mariners would be revived for the 2014 season.

=== Rebirth (2013–2014) ===
In September 2013, the AIF announced that Baltimore would be re-joining the league in 2014. On October 9, 2013, the Mariners announced Ron Meehan would be returning as head coach. In 2014, they won the AIF Championship against the Cape Fear Heroes.

==== 2014 season schedule ====
Date	Opponent	Home/Away	Result
March 20	[A.S.I. PANTHERS Preseason]	Home	W 56-46
April 4	Rochester Raiders	Away	W 52-28
April 19	Atlanta Sharks	Home	W 65-18
May 3	York Capitals	Away	W 40-31
May 9	York Capitals	Home	W 61-26
May 17	Cape Fear Heroes	Away	L 47-57
May 24	Atlanta Sharks	Home	L Forfeit
May 31^	Rochester Raiders	Away	W 46-40
June 14^	Cape Fear Heroes	Away	W 45-44

^ - indicates playoff game

== Statistics and records ==
=== Season-by-season results ===
Note: The finish, wins, losses, and ties columns list regular season results and exclude any postseason play.

League champions	Conference champions	Division champions	Wild card berth	League leader

Season	Team	League	Conference	Division	Regular season				Postseason results
Season	Team	League	Conference	Division	Finish	Wins	Losses	Ties	Postseason results
2008	2008	AIFA	North	Eastern	3rd	4	10	0	
2009	2009	AIFA		North	2nd	9	5	0	Lost North Division Playoff (Express) 20-50
2010	2010	AIFA		Eastern	1st	14	0	0	Won Eastern Divisional Championship (Stampede) 63-15; Won AIFA Championship Bowl VI (Cavalry) 57-42
2014	2014	AIF			2nd	4	2	0	Won Wild Card Playoff (Raiders) 46-40; Won AIFA Championship Bowl IX (Heroes) 45-44
Totals						31	17	0	All-time regular season record (2008–2014)
Totals						4	1	-	All-time postseason record (2008–2014)
Totals						35	18	0	All-time regular season and postseason record (2008–2014)

* Season currently in progress
