= Baltimore Blackbirds =

Indoor football team

Logo

General information
- Founded: 2007
- Folded: 2007
- Headquartered: Baltimore, Maryland at the 1st Mariner Arena
- Colors: Black, Red, White

Personnel
- General manager: John Wolfe
- Head coach: Chris Simpson

Team history
- Baltimore Blackbirds (2007)

Home fields
- 1st Mariner Arena (2007)

League / conference affiliations
- American Indoor Football Association (2007)

The Baltimore Blackbirds were an indoor football team based in Baltimore, Maryland. They played the 2007 season as an expansion member of the American Indoor Football Association, at the 1st Mariner Arena.

== History ==
The team was originally going to be a member of the Eastern Indoor Football League, but left for the AIFA soon after the "League Showcase/Jamboree" held inside the Mahoning Valley HitMen's "ThunderDome".

The Blackbirds played a predominant road schedule (eight away games, five at home), finishing with a record of 1–12. The team suffered severe financial problems, which resulted in players and coaches not receiving paychecks from their last two games for several months. Simpson resigned as head coach on August 3, 2007, expressing doubt about the future of the team. Three days later the AIFA moved to expel the Blackbirds from the league for breach of contract resulting from the Blackbirds negotiations with other leagues.

The arena lease was held by the league who opted to replace them with a new team which brought about the creation of the Baltimore Mariners.

== Season-by-season ==
Season records
Season	W	L	T	Finish	Playoff results
2007	1	12	0	7th Southern	--

== 2007 season schedule ==
Date	Opponent	Home/Away	Result
March 10	Reading Express	Away	Lost 6-78
March 16	Lakeland Thunderbolts	Away	Lost 14-69
March 24	Mississippi Mudcats	Away	Lost 20-80
March 31	Carolina Speed	Home	Lost 25-48
April 6	Canton Legends	Away	Lost 2-38
April 14	Montgomery Bears	Home	Lost 22-51
April 21	Florence Phantoms	Away	Lost 40-65
April 29	Gulf Coast Raiders	Home	Won 44-10
May 5	Carolina Speed	Away	Lost 32-52
May 12	Montgomery Bears	Away	Lost 11-58
May 21	Reading Express	Home	Lost 32-58
May 25	Tallahassee Titans	Away	Lost 40-73
June 1	Johnstown Riverhawks	Home	Lost 17-19
