= Carolina Speed =

American indoor football team

Logo

General information
- Founded: 2007
- Folded: 2011
- Headquartered: Concord, North Carolina at Cabarrus Arena and Charlotte, North Carolina at Bojangles' Coliseum
- Colors: Red, yellow, black, white

Personnel
- Owner: Eddie Littlefield
- Head coach: Brentson Buckner
- President: Larry Kennedy

Team history
- Carolina Speed (2007–2011)

Home fields
- Cabarrus Arena (2007–2008); Bojangles' Coliseum (2009, 2011)

League / conference affiliations
- American Indoor Football Association (2007–2009); Southern Indoor Football League (2011)

The Carolina Speed were a professional indoor football team that operated from 2007 to 2011 in Concord and Charlotte, North Carolina, at Bojangles' Coliseum in 2009 and 2011. From 2007 to 2009, the Speed were members of the American Indoor Football Association (AIFA). For the 2011 season, the Speed joined the Southern Indoor Football League (SIFL) and the team ceased operations after the season. The owner was Eddie Littlefield.

== History ==
The Speed began in the American Indoor Football Association (AIFA) and first played the 2007 and 2008 seasons in Concord, North Carolina, at Cabarrus Arena. In 2009, they moved home games to Bojangles' Coliseum in Charlotte. The team had decided not to participate in the 2010 AIFA season, but announced its intentions to return to the league in 2011. The team had also announced that it would play its future games at the Cabarrus Arena & Events Center in Concord, North Carolina, marking a return to the facility where the Speed began in 2007.

Due to the merger of the AIFA and Southern Indoor Football League (SIFL), the Speed returned in 2011 play in the SIFL. In addition, the Speed's website stated that they were not returning to Cabarrus and announced their 2011 season would once again have home games at Bojangles' Coliseum.

The franchise was to return in 2013 as the Charlotte Speed and play in the Professional Indoor Football League, after originally deciding to play in the Indoor Football League. However, their charter was revoked prior to the season opener and they have not been heard from since 2012.

== Logos ==
The name "Carolina Speed" comes from the winning name of a contest held at the Cabarrus County fair, as well as paying tribute to North Carolina's NASCAR heritage.

== Season-by-season ==
Season records
Season	W	L	T	Finish	Playoff results
Carolina Speed (AIFA)
2007	7	7	0	4th Southern	Lost SC Week 1 (Lakeland)
2008	6	8	0	3rd EC Eastern	--
2009	7	7	0	4th Southern	--
2010	Did not play				
Carolina Speed (SIFL)
2011	3	9	0	2nd EC Mid-Atlantic	--
Totals	23	32	0	(including playoffs)	

== 2007 season schedule ==
Date	Opponent	Home/Away	Result
February 3	Huntington Heroes	Away	Won 61–57
February 12	Tallahassee Titans	Home	Lost 44–62
February 17	Florence Phantoms	Away	Lost 36–64
February 26	Montgomery Bears	Home	Won 48–16
March 24	Erie Freeze	Home	Won 40–29
March 31	Baltimore Blackbirds	Away	Won 48–25
April 7	Mississippi Mudcats	Home	Won 64–52
April 14	Lakeland Thunderbolts	Away	Lost 19–57
April 21	Montgomery Bears	Away	Lost 34–63
April 28	Mississippi Mudcats	Away	Lost 28–70
May 5	Baltimore Blackbirds	Home	Won 52–32
May 12	Florence Phantoms	Home	Won 32–22
May 18	Tallahassee Titans	Away	Lost 48–68
May 25	Lakeland Thunderbolts	Home	Lost 21–39
June 11	Lakeland Thunderbolts (Playoffs)	Away	Lost 32–55

== 2008 season schedule ==
Date	Opponent	Home/Away	Result
March 9	Erie RiverRats	Away	Lost 21–42
March 15	Reading Express	Home	Won 49–17
March 22	Canton Legends	Away	Won 38–35
March 29	Huntington Heroes	Home	Lost 35–40
April 5	Columbus Lions	Home	Won 59–44
April 19	Mississippi Mudcats	Away	Lost 33–37
April 26	Fayetteville Guard	Home	Lost 18–19
May 3	Florida Stingrays	Home	Won 56–23
May 10	Baltimore Mariners	Away	Lost 23–48
May 17	Baltimore Mariners	Home	Won 72–36
May 31	Mississippi Mudcats	Away	Lost 18–59
June 6	Augusta Colts	Away	Lost 42–53
June 21	Florence Phantoms	Home	Lost 35–53
June 28	Florida Stingrays	Home	Won 63–57

== 2009 season schedule ==
Date	Opponent	Home/Away	Result
March 7	Florence Phantoms	Away	Won 37–29
March 14	Columbus Lions	Home	Lost 49–50
March 22	Columbus Lions	Away	Lost 37–68
March 28	Fayetteville Guard	Away	Lost 32–57
April 4	Erie RiverRats	Home	Won 38–12
April 18	Florence Phantoms	Home	Lost 31–37
April 25	South Carolina Force	Away	Lost 27–37
May 2	D.C. Armor	Home	Won 28–20
May 18	Florence Phantoms	Away	Won 51–21
May 30	South Carolina Force	Home	Lost 36–50
June 6	Erie RiverRats	Away	Won 51–21
June 13	D.C. Armor	Away	Lost 44–50
June 20	Fayetteville Guard	Home	Won 45–40
June 29	South Carolina Force	Home	Won 38–35

== 2011 season schedule ==
Date	Opponent	Home/Away	Result
March 18	Fayetteville Force	Away	Lost 39–44
March 25	Albany Panthers	Home	Lost 45–58
April 1	Erie Explosion	Home	Lost 36–39
April 8	Harrisburg Stampede	Home	Won 51–36
April 15	Trenton Steel	Away	Lost 42–86
May 1	Columbus Lions	Home	Lost 60–74
May 6	Alabama Hammers	Away	Lost 44–52
May 14	Harrisburg Stampede	Away	Lost 30–59
May 20	Richmond Raiders	Home	Won 50–48
May 29	Fayetteville Force	Home	Won 84–22
June 4	Richmond Raiders	Away	Lost 36–37
June 11	Columbus Lions	Away	Lost 40–55
