= Florence Center =

Multipurpose arena in Florence, South Carolina

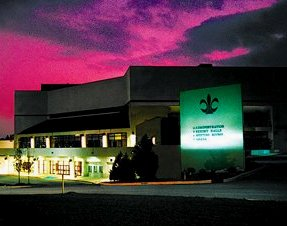
- Interactive map of Florence Center
- Former names: Florence Civic Center (1993–2017)
- Location: 3300 West Radio Drive; Florence, South Carolina 29501
- Coordinates: 34°11′8.50″N 79°50′16.40″W
- Owner: City of Florence, County of Florence
- Operator: SMG
- Capacity: Hockey: 7,526; Basketball: 7,686; Concert (Center Stage): 9,736; Concert (End Stage): 7,000; Theater: 1,400

Construction
- Groundbreaking: May 8, 1991; 35 years ago
- Opened: August 4, 1993; 33 years ago
- Cost: $22 million ($49 million in 2025 dollars)
- Architect: Odell Associates
- General contractor: M. B. Kahn Construction Co.

Tenants
- Pee Dee/Florence Pride (ECHL) (1997–2005); Carolina Stingrays (NIFL) (2004); Florence Flyers (USBL) (2004); Pee Dee Cyclones (SPHL) (2005–2007); Florence Phantoms (AIFL/AIFA) (2006–2009); Pee Dee Vipers (PBL) (2014); Carolina Havoc (AAL) (2019); Pee Dee IceCats (SPHL) (2025–present); South Carolina Ravens (PAIA) (2025)

The Florence Center is a 10,000-seat multi-purpose arena in Florence, South Carolina. The arena was known as the Florence Civic Center until it rebranded in November 2017.

It hosted the infamous eighth WWE In Your House pay-per-view in 1996, during which a storm knocked out the power and thus the broadcast signal during the event. The card was re-telecast two nights later from North Charleston, South Carolina, at the North Charleston Coliseum.

Since 2005 it is home to the annual Darlington Car Hauler Parade that kicks off Goodyear 400 race week at Darlington Raceway. Starting in the 2025–26 season, it will host the Pee Dee IceCats, a new franchise in the Federal Prospects Hockey League.

The building was the home of the South Carolina Fire Ants of Major League Roller Hockey in 1998, two ice hockey teams: the Pee Dee/Florence Pride (1997–2005) and the Pee Dee Cyclones (2005–2007), three indoor football teams: Carolina Stingrays (2004), Florence Phantoms (2006–2009), and Carolina Havoc (2019), two basketball teams: the Florence Flyers and the Pee Dee Vipers, and to the Florence Symphony Orchestra.

The venue currently hosts the South Carolina High School League championships in basketball (since 2024) and wrestling (beginning in 2025).

The Florence Center has hosted: Sent by Ravens (from Hartsville) in '11, Lady A in '11, Willie Nelson in '13, Marshall Tucker Band with Charlie Daniels Band in '13, The Beach Boys in '13, Switchfoot with Needtobreathe in '15, Mary J. Blige in '15, and Boyz II Men in '19.
