= Mississippi MudCats =

Mississippi Mudcats
Logo

General information
- Founded: 2007
- Folded: 2009
- Headquartered: Tupelo, Mississippi at the BancorpSouth Arena
- Colors: Green, gold, white, silver
- Mascot: Muddy

Personnel
- Owner: Jim Waide
- Head coach: Brian Brents

Team history
- Mississippi Mudcats (2007–2009)

Home fields
- BancorpSouth Arena (2007–2009)

League / conference affiliations
- American Indoor Football Association (2007–2009)

The Mississippi MudCats were a team in the American Indoor Football Association. They played their home games at BancorpSouth Arena in Tupelo, Mississippi.

== History ==
The team was announced on June 20, 2006. One month later, Todd Ellis, former Georgia Tech football player, was announced as the team owner and president. A name-the team contest was held, and despite Ellis' preference of Tupelo Kings in honor of Tupelo-born Elvis Presley, the team was named the Mississippi MudCats for the state's catfish industry. Brian Brents was announced as the inaugural head coach.

In the 2007 season, the Mudcats averaged over 4,000 people per game. At the end of the season, civil rights attorney Jim Waide bought the team from Todd Ellis.

The 2008 MudCats lost only one regular season game for best record in the AIFA for 2008 at 13–1. They won their division championship playoff game against the Columbus Lions before losing in the conference championship to the Wyoming Cavalry. In late 2008, owner Jim Waide has said he would not field a team in 2009.

== Season-by-season records ==
Season records
Season	W	L	T	Finish	Playoff results
2007	11	3	0	2nd Southern Div.	Won Conf. Semifinal (Tallahassee) 62–32; Lost Conf. Championship (Lakeland) 62–84
2008	13	1	0	1st South Div.	Won Div. Championship (Columbus) 52–50; Lost Conf. Championship (Wyoming) 26–54
Totals	26	6	0	(including playoffs)	

== 2007 season schedule ==
Date	Opponent	Home/Away	Result
February 3	Pittsburgh RiverRats	Home	Won 54–34
February 10	Montgomery Bears	Home	Won 57–27
February 17	Lakeland Thunderbolts	Home	Won 46–36
February 24	Gulf Coast Raiders	Home	Won 74–45
March 10	Tallahassee Titans	Away	Won 62–58
March 17	Florence Phantoms	Home	Won 63–14
March 24	Baltimore Blackbirds	Home	Won 80–20
April 2	Montgomery Bears	Away	Won 62–37
April 7	Carolina Speed	Away	Lost 52–64
April 14	Tallahassee Titans	Home	Won 80–75
April 28	Carolina Speed	Home	Won 70–28
May 5	Lakeland Thunderbolts	Away	Lost 31–54
May 19	Florence Phantoms	Away	Lost 45–44
May 25	Erie Freeze	Away	Won 53–47
June 10	Tallahassee Titans (playoffs)	Home	Won 62–32
June 18	Lakeland Thunderbolts (playoffs)	Away	Lost 62–84
