= Florida Stingrays =

General information
- Founded: 2007
- Headquartered: Fort Myers, Florida
- Colors: Garnet, Gold, White

Personnel
- Owner: Jason Lawrence
- Head coach: Ryan Williams

Team history
- Florida Stingrays (2008-present)

Home fields
- Lee County Civic Center (2008, 2012); Rutenberg Park (outdoor, 2013-2019); Evangelical Christian School football field (2020); Bishop Verot High School football field (2021)

League / conference affiliations
- American Indoor Football Association (2008) Southern Amateur Football Association (2012); United Football Federation of America (2013-2020); American Football Alliance (2021-2022) Elite American Football League 2023-Present

The Florida Stingrays are a semi-professional football team out of Fort Myers, Florida that was established in 2007 in the American Indoor Football Association and United Football Federation of America. They were once a 2008 expansion team of the American Indoor Football Association, where they played their home games at the Lee County Civic Center. They are currently playing for the Elite American Football League.

== 2008 Season ==
The Stingrays were the only winless team in the AIFA in 2008. During the season, Riley Ware was appointed interim head coach. After the season, the majority owner of the team left, and the team suspended operations.

== 2012 Season ==
The Florida Stingrays were scheduled to play in 2012 at Germain Arena but hoped to play at Lee County Civic Center for the Southern Indoor Football League. Instead, they became an amateur team and joined the Southern Amateur Football Association.

== Season-by-season ==
Season records
Season	W	L	T	Finish	Playoff results
Florida Stingrays (AIFA)
2008	0	14	0	4th WC Southern	--
2009	--	--	--	--	--
2010	--	--	--	--	--
2011	--	--	--	--	--
Florida Stingrays (SAFA)
2012	6	4	0	2nd South Division	Loss Quarterfinal (Gainesville Gators)
