= Erie Freeze =

- Founded: 2005
- Folded: 2007
- Team history: Erie Freeze (2005–2007)
- Based in: Erie, Pennsylvania at the Louis J. Tullio Arena
- Home arena: Louis J. Tullio Arena (2005–2007)
- League: American Indoor Football Association (2005-2007)
- Colors: Ice blue, black, white

Personnel
- Team president: David Hodas

The Erie Freeze was an American indoor football team based in Erie, Pennsylvania.

They were an original member of the American Indoor Football League in 2005, and advanced to the first AIFL Championship Game. When the league was reorganized into the American Indoor Football Association in 2007, they continued league play until the end of the 2007. Negotiations between the team ownership and the league fell apart in late 2007, and thus put an end to the franchise. They were replaced in 2008 by the Erie RiverRats, who relocated from Pittsburgh, Pennsylvania.

Erie was the only market to have an AIFL and AIFA team from the time of its founding in 2005 until its breakup and eventual cessation of operations in 2010.

== History ==
Prior to the arrival of the Freeze, Erie, Pennsylvania had one other indoor football team, the Erie Invaders of the Indoor Football League, back in 2000. The Freeze played well in the league's inaugural season, earning a 9–1 regular season record and winning a semifinal playoff game against the Canton Legends. With the victory, the Freeze earned the right to host the league's first American Bowl (the league's championship game) against the Richmond Bandits. However, the Freeze lost the game 56–30, in part because of six interceptions by quarterback David Dinkins, who played much of the game with a corneal abrasion. Dinkins, who had been on the roster of the Buffalo Bills of the National Football League, as a utility player, was named the 2005 AIFL MVP with a 60% completion rate, along with 3,000+ passing yards and 812 rushing yards. In addition, head coach Mike Esposito was named 2005 AIFL Coach of the Year.

The Freeze took necessary steps to prepare themselves for another championship run in 2006, which included the re-signings of Dinkins (Quarterback), Johnathan Sitter (Center), JR Cipra (Kicker), Eugene Padgett (Defensive Back), Chris Blackshear (Defensive Back), Dave Smith (Defensive Line), and Donte Pimpleton (Wide Receiver). Despite signing a three-year contract extension with the team, Mike Esposito did not re-join the Freeze, instead accepting a job as the head coach of the Odessa Roughnecks of the Intense Football League, an indoor football league based in Texas. On Friday, January 6, 2006, the Freeze named Jerry "The Condo" Crafts as the team's new head coach. Crafts played several years as an offensive lineman for the Buffalo Bills, and later for the XFL's Los Angeles Xtreme and the Arena Football League's Buffalo Destroyers.

On March 31, 2006, the Freeze managed to set some records during their 62–6 onslaught over the Steubenville Stampede. Freeze defensive back Sam Reynolds recorded a league regular single game record with four interceptions. Also, the Freeze defense recorded 9 turnovers and held the Stampede to a league low 6 points.

On April 7, 2006, the Freeze was handed their first regular season loss by the Huntington Heroes, 55–33.

On April 17, 2006, the Freeze organization made a sudden change at the head coach position. Defensive coordinator David Arnold was named head coach for the remainder of the 2006 season.

Despite a rocky second half of the season, the Freeze ended the 2006 regular season at 10–4 and earned the Northern Conference's #3 seed. Unfortunately, they fell to the eventual-AIFL champion Canton Legends 54–45. The loss made the Freeze 0–3 when they play the Legends in Canton, Ohio.

For 2007, the Freeze took steps to resign some familiar faces around the Freeze organization, including Roosevelt Benjamin, Chris Blackshear, Shea D’Ambrosio, Manuel Johnson, Sam Reynolds, Dajuan Smith, Dave Smith, and Darmel Whitfield. The team lost quarterback David Dinkins to the Pittsburgh RiverRats, and signed Randall Secky (from nearby Bemus Point, New York and the former starting quarterback for the UB Bulls) to fill the void left by Dinkins' departure. The Freeze managed to sign Jovon Johnson, a Mercyhurst Preparatory School and University of Iowa graduate. However, the signing was short lived as Johnson subsequently joined the practice squad of the Pittsburgh Steelers.

The 2007 season was very difficult for the Freeze, and the team went from playoff contenders in 2006 to the bottom of the league, earning only a 1–13 record. The turnaround was so swift that Freeze owner David Hodas sent out an open letter to the fans thanking them for their support and begging them to stay on board.

Despite the description of the Erie market as "successful", after the end of the 2007 season, the league reluctantly demanded "significant changes" to the Freeze's ownership structure in order for their contract to be renewed. Hodas attempted to sell the team to a new owner, but paperwork problems caused the deal to fall through. As such, on October 8, 2007, the AIFA effectively kicked the Freeze out of the league.

The Freeze were expected to return in 2009 by joining another league (the Continental Indoor Football League was mentioned as a possibility). To compensate for the team being removed, the league arranged for the Pittsburgh RiverRats (who were seeking a new arena) to move from Pittsburgh to Erie thus becoming the Erie RiverRats, along with former Freeze members Dinkins and Cipra. The Freeze quietly folded shortly thereafter. The RiverRats, later rebranded as the Erie Explosion, played for eight additional consecutive seasons in Erie before suspending operations in early 2016.

The team played their home games at the Louis J. Tullio Arena (also the home of the OHL's Erie Otters). The name 'Freeze' referred to Erie's frigid temperature in the winter, and also the lake effect snow from Lake Erie. The team's colors were black and ice blue. Their official mascot was "Freddy", a friendly snow-white yeti wearing a black jersey, football pants, and boots.

== Trivia ==
- Whenever an Erie Freeze player scores a touchdown at home, the song "Freeze Frame" (by the J. Geils Band) is played.
- In 2008, the Flint Phantoms played their inaugural game on turf bought from the Freeze. The turf still bore the Freeze name and logo.

== Season-by-season ==
Season records
Season	W	L	T	Finish	Playoff results
Erie Freeze (AIFL)
2005	9	1	0	1st League	Lost American Bowl I (Richmond)
2006	10	4	0	3rd Northern	Lost NC Round 1 (Canton)
Erie Freeze (AIFA)
2007	1	13	0	7th Northern	--
2008	Did not play				
Totals	21	20	0	(including playoffs)	
