= Fayetteville Guard =

American indoor football team

Logo

General information
- Founded: 2003
- Folded: 2010
- Headquartered: Fayetteville, North Carolina at the Cumberland County Crown Coliseum
- Colors: Black, green, brown, white

Team history
- Myrtle Beach Stingrays (2003–2004); Carolina Stingrays (2004); Fayetteville Guard (2005–2010)

Home fields
- Myrtle Beach Convention Center (2003–2004); Florence Civic Center (2004); Cumberland County Crown Coliseum (2005–2010)

League / conference affiliations
- National Indoor Football League (2003–2007); American Indoor Football Association (2008–2010)

Championships
- Conference championships: 1 NIFL: 2006
- Division championships: 1 NIFL: 2006

Playoff appearances (3)
- NIFL (2005, 2006); AIFA (2009)

The Fayetteville Guard were a professional indoor football team in the National Indoor Football League (NIFL) and American Indoor Football Association (AIFA). They played home games at the Cumberland County Crown Coliseum from 2005 to 2010.

The Guard were replaced by the Fayetteville Force in the Southern Indoor Football League (SIFL) for the 2011 season. After a 3–0 start to the 2011 SIFL season, the Force collapsed and was eventually sold to the AIFA. The Force did not return in 2012 and were replaced the Cape Fear Heroes expansion team as part of American Indoor Football.

== History ==
=== Stingrays ===
The teams began play in 2003 as the Myrtle Beach Stingrays of the National Indoor Football League in the Myrtle Beach Convention Center, compiling a 6–8 record in their inaugural season. After two games in the 2004 season, the NIFL shut down the team due to the team owners, April Coble and Jack Bowman, failing to pay the players and other obligations. However, local investors including then head coach Terry Smith, saved the team in time to schedule a third game at the Staten Island Xtreme the last weekend of April. On April 29, the team was moved to Florence, South Carolina, for the remainder of the season as the Carolina Stingrays with seven home games at the Florence Civic Center. The relocated team finished with a 3–6 record in Florence and a final 5–7 record in their second season.

=== Guard ===
The following year, the team was purchased again and moved to Fayetteville to replace af2's Cape Fear Wildcats, who had moved to Albany, Georgia, as the South Georgia Wildcats. The new team had originally been called the Fayetteville Heat, but later changed their name to the Fayetteville Guard. The team started their season 0–5, but went 7–2 in their final nine regular season games, earning a 7–7 record and a playoff berth. The team defeated the Dayton Warbirds in the first round, but lost to the Cincinnati Marshals in the divisional round.

The Guard did better in 2006, posting a 13–1 record in the regular season, then defeating the Lakeland Thunderbolts and River City Rage en route to Indoor Bowl VI, where they lost to the Billings Outlaws.

In August 2006, it was reported that the Guard were moving to the World Indoor Football League. However, the Guard denied these rumors by announcing that they were staying in the NIFL in a press conference two months later. During the 2007 season, the Guard and Wyoming Cavalry organized with owners of other independently owned NIFL teams to ensure they had a complete season, but without the approval of the rapidly falling apart NIFL management, which led to a midseason schedule split between the league-owned teams and the independent teams. Both the Guard and Cavalry were subsequently expelled from the NIFL before the post season. They played against each other in the Budweiser Indoor Football Championship Bowl, where the Guard won 48–34. Both teams joined the American Indoor Football Association (AIFA) the following 2008 season.

=== Force ===
Fayetteville Force
Logo

General information
- Founded: 2010
- Folded: 2011
- Headquartered: Fayetteville, North Carolina at the Cumberland County Crown Coliseum
- Colors: Black, green, brown, white

Personnel
- Owners: Fanteractive, LLC; AIFA
- Head coach: Demetrius Ross; Matt Steeple

Team history
- Fayetteville Force (2011)

Home fields
- Cumberland County Crown Coliseum (2011)

League / conference affiliations
- Southern Indoor Football League (2011)

Following the 2010 AIFA season, the league split into two leagues: the AIFA West and East. The AIFA East, of which Fayetteville was a member, then merged into the Southern Indoor Football League (SIFL) for the 2011 season . However, a new Fayetteville-based sports marketing group claimed the rights to field a SIFL team in the Fayetteville market and the Guard did not return for the 2011 season. The new team, not affiliated with the Guard or its owners, were called the Fayetteville Force. After a 3–0 start to the 2011 SIFL season, the team collapsed.

The AIFA entered into an asset purchase agreement of selected assets of the Fayetteville Force from Fanteractive, LLC, the Force's parent company, but the AIFA did not purchase the corporation that was operating the Force. Under the agreement the AIFA retained the Force name, logo, likeness, playing equipment, and the artificial turf. The AIFA guaranteed that it would play the remaining four Force games with the Southern Indoor Football League.

Due to contractual issues between the previous owner and his players and coaches at the time, the AIFA was unable to take over those contracts. On two-day notice before the Erie away game, the AIFA had to assemble a team of available players from a group of former indoor players and rookies. The AIFA selected as head coach Matt Steeple, a veteran indoor coach from the Indoor Football League for the balance of the 2011 season. The new Fayetteville Force never won a game and has the dubious distinction of setting a record for the largest single-game losing margin and points allowed in the history of indoor football – in any league – following a 0–138 loss to the Erie Explosion on May 21, 2011.

The AIFA reorganized as American Indoor Football (AIF) after the SIFL folded following its lone 2011 season. The Force did not return in 2012 and were replaced the Cape Fear Heroes expansion team in the AIF.

== Season-by-season ==
=== Results ===
League champions	Conference champions	Division champions	Playoff berth	League leader

Season	League	Conference	Division	Regular season				Postseason results
Season	League	Conference	Division	Finish	Wins	Losses	Ties	Postseason results
Myrtle Beach Stingrays
2003	NIFL	Atlantic	Eastern	4th	6	8	0	
Myrtle Beach/Carolina Stingrays (Note: Relocated and changed names during the season.)
2004	NIFL	Atlantic	Eastern	3rd	5	7	0	
Fayetteville Guard
2005	NIFL	Atlantic	Central	3rd	7	7	0	Won Conf. Quarterfinal 78–63 (Dayton); Lost Con. Semifinal 69–70 (Cincinnati)
2006	NIFL	Atlantic	Eastern	1st	13	1	0	Won Conf. Semifinal 44–18 (Lakeland); Won Con. Championship 72–70 (River City); Lost Indoor Bowl VI 44–59 (Billings)
2007	NIFL/Ind. (Note: Due to league issues, the Guard and Wyoming Cavalry were kicked out of the league before the postseason. The NIFL then never had any playoffs before ending the season.)	Atlantic	Eastern	1st (Note: At the time when they were expelled.)	11	0	0	Won Budweiser Indoor Football Championship Bowl 48–34 (Wyoming)
2008	AIFA	Eastern	East	4th	5	9	0	
2009	AIFA		South	2nd	8	6	0	Lost Div. Championship 35–45 (Columbus)
2010	AIFA		Eastern	2nd	2	12	0	
Totals					57	50	0	All-time regular season record (2003–2010)
Totals					4	3	—	All-time postseason record (2003–2010)
Totals					61	53	0	All-time regular season and postseason record (2003–2010)
Fayetteville Force
2011	SIFL	Eastern	Mid-Atlantic	3rd	3	9	0	
Totals					3	9	0	All-time regular season record (2011)
Totals					0	0	—	All-time postseason record (2011)
Totals					3	9	0	All-time regular season and postseason record (2011)

=== Schedules ===
==== 2005 ====
Date	Opponent	Result	Att.	Record
March 26	at River City	L, 43–46	3,892	0–1
April 2	Odessa	L, 46–52	2,991	0–2
April 9	at Cincinnati	L, 54–57	4,208	0–3
April 16	Rome	L, 57–60	2,828	0–4
April 23	at Montgomery	L, 20–35	3,965	0–5
April 30	Montgomery	W, 64–21	—	1–5
May 8	at Rome	L, 45–48 (OT)	1,250	1–6
May 13	at Kissimmee	W, 47–34	1,102	2–6
May 21	River City	W, 60–51	—	3–6
May 28	Cincinnati	W, 48–34	1,634	4–6
June 4	Kissimmee	W, 55–14	2,600	5–6
June 11	Daytona Beach	W, 41–37	4,012	6–6
June 18	at SW Louisiana	L, 38–53	4,012	6–7
June 25	Miami	W, 62–2	3,012	7–7
Conference Quarterfinal
July 9	Dayton	W, 78–63	2,180	
Conference Semifinal
July 16	Cincinnati	L, 69–70	3,443	

==== 2006 ====
Date	Opponent	Result	Att.	Record
March 25	at Montgomery	W, 44–7	2,144	1–0
April 1	at Osceola	W, 58–55	1,897	2–0
April 9	at Florida	W, 44–41	—	3–0
April 14	at Greensboro	W, 45–26	3,218	4–0
April 22	Osceola	W, 54–51	3,200	5–0
April 29	at Lakeland	L, 41–60	2,697	5–1
May 4	at Charleston	W, 62–44	1,800	6–1
May 13	Cincinnati	W, 70–26	2,097	7–1
May 20	Palm Beach	W, 59–20	2,000	8–1
May 27	Palm Beach	W, 70–0	4,185	9–1
June 3	Tennessee	W, 78–14	2,645	10–1
June 10	Greensboro	W, 58–40	1,563	11–1
June 17	Charleston	W, 74–14	1,241	12–1
June 24	Montgomery	W, 68–14	2,385	13–1
Conference Semifinal
July 16	Lakeland	W, 44–18	3,129	
Conference Championship
July 22	at RiverCity	W, 72–70 (OT)	3,223	
Indoor Bowl VI
July 28	at Billings	L, 44–59	7,934	

==== 2007 ====
Date	Opponent	Result	Record
March 31	Columbia	W, 69–18	1–0
April 14	The Marshals	W, 77–14	2–0
April 20	at Greensboro	W, 60–28	3–0
April 28	at The Marshals	W, 59–28	4–0
May 5	Atlanta	W, 64–22	5–0
May 26	at Columbia	W, 34–24	6–0
June 2	Greensboro	W, 68–28	7–0
June 9	The Marshals	W, 91–6	8–0
June 23	Columbia	W, 108–0	9–0
June 30	at Greensboro	W, 63–24	10–0
July 7	Greensboro	W, 47–0	11–0
Postseason (independent)
July 14	Wyoming	W, 48–34	

==== 2008 ====
Date	Opponent	Result	Record
March 22	at Mississippi	L, 34–82	0–1
March 30	Augusta	L, 14–47	0–2
April 13	Florence	L, 38–39	0–3
April 19	at Columbus	L, 16–75	0–4
April 26	at Carolina	W, 19–18	1–4
May 3	at Huntington	W, 34–26	2–4
May 10	Augusta	W, 56–43	3–4
May 17	at Reading	L, 24–51	3–5
May 23	at Canton	L, 22–34	3–6
May 30	at Florence	L, 6–50	3–7
June 7	Huntington	W, 51–21	4–7
June 14	Florida	W, 48–34	5–7
June 21	Columbus	L, 58–59	5–8
June 28	Florida	L, 41–43	5–9

==== 2009 ====
Date	Opponent	Result	Record
March 21	at South Carolina	W, 39–18	1–0
March 28	Carolina	W, 58–32	2–0
April 4	at Florence	L, 49–50	2–1
April 11	at D.C.	W, 56–18	3–1
April 18	South Carolina	L, 48–53	3–2
April 25	Columbus	W, 41–37	4–2
May 2	Erie	W, 58–28	5–2
May 9	at Reading	L, 50–63	5–3
May 23	at South Carolina	W, 46–34	6–3
May 30	Reading	W, 57–53	7–3
June 6	Florence	W, 59–27	8–3
June 13	at Columbus	L, 43–61	8–4
June 20	at Carolina	L, 40–45	8–5
June 20	Columbus	L, 25–44	8–6
Division Championship
	Columbus	L, 35–45	

==== 2010 ====
Date	Opponent	Result	Record
March 21	at Baltimore	L, 0–59	0–1
March 27	New Jersey	W, 75–15	1–1
April 3	at Richmond	L, 39–55	1–2
April 10	at Harrisburg	L, 21–49	1–3
April 17	at New Jersey	W, 37–19	2–3
April 24	Baltimore	L, 19–91	2–4
May 1	Reading	L, 33–62	2–5
May 8	at Richmond	L, 28–55	2–6
May 13	Baltimore	L, 34–63	2–7
May 22	at Erie	L, 52–55	2–8
May 29	Harrisburg	L, 28–64	2–9
June 12	at Reading	L, 48–49	2–10
June 19	Erie	L, 58–65	2–11
June 26	Richmond	L, 33–56	2–12

==== 2011 ====
Date	Opponent	Result	Record
March 18	Carolina	W, 44–39	1–0
March 27	Harrisburg	W, 75–66	2–0
April 3	at Trenton	W, 56–53	3–0
April 9	Columbus	L, 29–28	3–1
April 16	at Richmond	L, 43–61	3–2
April 23	Albany	L, 40–43	3–3
April 29	Trenton	L, 41–69	3–4
May 7	at Columbus	L, 32–81	3–5
May 21	at Erie	L, 0–138	3–6
May 29	at Carolina	L, 22–84	3–7
June 4	at Alabama	L, 12–92	3–8
June 11	Richmond	L, 66–88	3–9
