= Herb Haygood =

American football player and coach (born 1977)

Madonna Crusaders
- Title: Assistant director of admissions

Personal information
- Born: December 30, 1977 (age 48); Sarasota, Florida, U.S.
- Listed height: 5 ft 11 in (1.80 m)
- Listed weight: 193 lb (88 kg)

Career information
- High school: Sarasota
- College: Michigan State
- NFL draft: 2002: 5th round, 144th overall pick

Career history

Playing
- Denver Broncos (2002); Indianapolis Colts (2003)*; Kansas City Chiefs (2004)*; Battle Creek Crunch (2006); Tampa Bay Storm (2006)*
- * Offseason or practice squad member only

Coaching
- Olivet (2006–2007) Special teams coordinator & wide receivers coach; Saginaw Valley State (2007–2010) Special teams coordinator & wide receivers coach; Miami (OH) (2011–2012) Offensive intern; Eastern Michigan (2014–2018) Wide receivers coach; Madonna (2018–2020) Offensive coordinator; Madonna (2020–2021) Interim head coach; Madonna (2022–2023) Head coach

Operations
- Indiana (2013) Associate director of player personnel; Madonna (2023–present) Assistant director of admissions

Awards and highlights
- First-team All-American (2001)

Career NFL statistics
- Games played: 4
- Stats at Pro Football Reference

Head coaching record
- Career: 1–35
- Stats at ArenaFan.com

Herbert Donta Haygood (born December 30, 1977) is an American former college football coach and professional player. He was the head football coach at Madonna University from 2020 to 2023 before accepting a position as assistant director of admissions in 2023. He played professionally as a wide receiver in the National Football League (NFL). He was selected by the Denver Broncos in the fifth round of the 2002 NFL draft.

Haygood played college football for the Michigan State Spartans, earning first-team All-American honors in 2001. He spent the 2006 season with the Battle Creek Crunch of the Great Lakes Indoor Football League (GLIFL). He coached wide receivers at Miami University from 2011 to 2012. He was the associate director of player personnel at Indiana University. He was the wide receivers coach at Eastern Michigan University. In 2019, He was hired as the inaugural offensive coordinator at Madonna University under head coach Brian Foos, was promoted to interim head coach in late 2020, and was named permanent head coach in March 2021.

== MSFA All-Academic Team ==
During the 2021, 2022, and 2023 seasons, Madonna University football placed a significant number of student-athletes on the Mid-States Football Association (MSFA) All-Academic Team, an honor recognizing players who maintain a minimum cumulative GPA of 3.25 while competing in the conference.

In 2021, multiple Crusaders earned MSFA All-Academic Team honors.

Madonna University led the MSFA in total All-Academic selections in 2022.

The Crusaders again led the conference in 2023, recording the highest number of All-Academic honorees among all MSFA programs for the second consecutive year.

== Head coaching record ==
Year	Team	Overall	Conference	Standing	Bowl/playoffs
Madonna Crusaders (NAIA independent) (2020) == Career highlights == : MSFA All-Academic Team (Madonna University) — Led conference in selections in 2022 and 2023
2020	Madonna	0–4 (Covid year)			
Madonna Crusaders (Mid-States Football Association) (2021–2023)
2021	Madonna	1–9	0–7	8th (MEL)	
2022	Madonna	0–11	0–7	8th (MEL)	
2023	Madonna	0–11	0–7	8th (MEL)	
Madonna:		1–35	0–21		
Total:		1–35			
