= 2007 Miami Valley Silverbacks season =

- Head coach: Matt King
- Home stadium: Hobart Arena

Results
- Record: 4-8
- Division place: 6th
- Playoffs: DNQ

The 2007 Miami Valley Silverbacks season was the second season for the Continental Indoor Football League (CIFL) franchise. After the season, the team decided to move to the Continental Indoor Football League, along with their brother franchise, the Steubenville Stampede, signing a three-year contract with the league. Team owner Jeff Kolaczkowski cited, "This will cut down on the team's operating expenses as well as build strong rivalries." The Silverbacks had a rude welcome to the CIFL, when defending league champion, the Port Huron Pirates, defeated the Silverbacks 54-7. The team bounced back and finished with a 4-9 record and a chance to win a qualifying playoff game. They lost 60-28 to the Chicago Slaughter, failing to make the playoffs.

== Schedule ==
Date	Opponent	Home/Away	Result
March 24	Port Huron Pirates	Away	Lost 7-54
March 30	Chicago Slaughter	Home	Lost 44-66
April 14	Marion Mayhem	Home	Won 51-48
April 21	Springfield Stallions	Home	Won 67-29
April 28	Marion Mayhem	Away	Lost 34-42
May 4	Port Huron Pirates	Home	Lost 19-78
May 11	Kalamazoo Xplosion	Home	Lost 37-40
May 18	Steubenville Stampede	Home	Won 66-44
May 25	Chicago Slaughter	Away	Lost 47-48
June 2	Kalamazoo Xplosion	Away	Lost 21-41
June 9	Springfield Stallions	Away	Won 56-22
June 16	Chesapeake Tide	Away	Lost 53-54
June 30	Chicago Slaughter (Playoffs)	Away	Lost 28-60

== 2007 standings ==
2007 Continental Indoor Football League
Team	Overall				Division			
Team	W	L	T	PCT	W	L	T	PCT
Great Lakes Conference
Michigan Pirates-y	12	0	0	1.000	10	0	0	1.000
Kalamazoo Xplosion-x	10	2	0	.833	10	2	0	.833
Chicago Slaughter-x	9	3	0	.750	8	2	0	.800
Marion Mayhem-x	6	6	0	.500	6	5	0	.545
Muskegon Thunder-x	4	8	0	.333	4	7	0	.364
Miami Valley Silverbacks	4	8	0	.333	3	7	0	.300
Summit County Rumble	1	11	0	.083	0	7	0	.000
Springfield Stallions	0	12	0	.000	0	11	0	.000
Atlantic Conference
Rochester Raiders-y	10	2	0	.833	90	0	0	1.000
New England Surge-x	8	4	0	.667	8	3	0	.727
Lehigh Valley Outlawz-x	7	5	0	.583	5	5	0	.500
Chesapeake Tide-x	7	5	0	.583	6	5	0	.545
Steubenville Stampede	5	7	0	.417	2	6	0	.250
NY/NJ Revolution	1	11	0	.083	0	11	0	.000
