= 2007 Marion Mayhem season =

Sports season

- Owner: R.A. Mallonn; Fred Horner; Tim Cugini; John Slebodnik
- Head coach: Nathan Degasperis
- Home stadium: Veterans Memorial Coliseum; 220 East Fairground Street; Marion, OH 43302

Results
- Record: 6–6
- Conference place: 4th
- Playoffs: Won Great Lakes Conference qualifier 68–57 (Thunder); Lost Great Lakes Conference Semifinals 20–70 (Pirates)

The 2007 Marion Mayhem season was the second season for the Continental Indoor Football League (CIFL) franchise. Before the season began, 4th Down and Long LLC sold the team to Michael Burtch. Joining the team would be former Ohio State University quarterback, Stanley Jackson. Jackson would later become a part owner of the franchise due to their small budget operation. Jackson went on to set league records for pass completions (177), pass attempts (348) and interceptions thrown (16). Marion finished 6–6 in 2007, good enough to make the CIFL playoffs. After eliminating the Muskegon Thunder in the first round of the CIFL playoffs, the Mayhem's season was ended by a loss to the Michigan (formally Port Huron) Pirates.

== Schedule ==
Date	Opponent	Home/Away	Result
March 24	Kalamazoo Xplosion	Home	L 35–37
March 31	Muskegon Thunder	Home	W 48–20
April 14	Miami Valley Silverbacks	Away	L 48–51
April 21	Kalamazoo Xplosion	Away	L 31–39
April 28	Miami Valley Silverbacks	Home	W 42–34
May 5	Springfield Stallions	Away	W 51–26
May 12	Chicago Slaughter	Home	L 30–55
May 19	Lehigh Valley Outlawz	Away	L 25–48
May 26	Port Huron Pirates	Away	L 3–56
June 9	Summit County Rumble	Home	W 48–45
June 16	Springfield Stallions	Home	W Forfeit
June 23	Summit County Rumble	Away	W 77–63
	2007 CIFL PLAYOFFS		
June 29	Muskegon Thunder (GL Quarterfinals)	Home	W 68–57
July 7	Michigan Pirates (GL Semifinals)	Away	L 20–70

== 2007 standings ==
2007 Continental Indoor Football League
Team	Overall				Division			
Team	W	L	T	PCT	W	L	T	PCT
Great Lakes Conference
Michigan Pirates-y	12	0	0	1.000	10	0	0	1.000
Kalamazoo Xplosion-x	10	2	0	.833	10	2	0	.833
Chicago Slaughter-x	9	3	0	.750	8	2	0	.800
Marion Mayhem-x	6	6	0	.500	6	5	0	.545
Muskegon Thunder-x	4	8	0	.333	4	7	0	.364
Miami Valley Silverbacks	4	8	0	.333	3	7	0	.300
Summit County Rumble	1	11	0	.083	0	7	0	.000
Springfield Stallions	0	12	0	.000	0	11	0	.000
Atlantic Conference
Rochester Raiders-y	10	2	0	.833	90	0	0	1.000
New England Surge-x	8	4	0	.667	8	3	0	.727
Lehigh Valley Outlawz-x	7	5	0	.583	5	5	0	.500
Chesapeake Tide-x	7	5	0	.583	6	5	0	.545
Steubenville Stampede	5	7	0	.417	2	6	0	.250
NY/NJ Revolution	1	11	0	.083	0	11	0	.000
