= 2006 Marion Mayhem season =

- Owner: R.A. Mallonn; Fred Horner; Tim Cugini; John Slebodnik
- Head coach: Tracy Smith
- Home stadium: Veterans Memorial Coliseum; 220 East Fairground Street; Marion, OH 43302

Results
- Record: 4–6
- League place: 5th
- Playoffs: did not qualify

The 2006 Marion Mayhem season was the first season for the Great Lakes Indoor Football League (GLIFL) franchise. The Mayhem were announced to the public on September 16, 2005, as the fourth expansion team for the newly formed Great Lakes Indoor Football League. Their inaugural owners of the Mayhem were 4th Down and Long LLC, run by R.A. Mallonn, Fred Horner, Tim Cugini, and John Slebodnik. The team hired Tracy Smith as their inaugural coach and general manager on November 2, 2005. The Mayhem suffered a losing inaugural season in 2006 (4-6), however the Mayhem were within one game of the 2006 GLIFL playoffs. The Mayhem missed the playoffs due to the Battle Creek Crunch holding the tie breaker between the two teams.

== Schedule ==
Date	Opponent	Home/Away	Result
April 8	Lehigh Valley Outlawz	Home	L 26-41
April 13	Battle Creek Crunch	Away	W 37-34
April 29	NY/NJ Revolution	Home	W 81-32
May 6	Battle Creek Crunch	Home	L 29-42
May 13	Port Huron Pirates	Home	L 27-43
May 20	Rochester Raiders	Home	W 42-38
June 2	Port Huron Pirates	Away	L 26-57
June 10	NY/NJ Revolution	Home	W 51-32
June 17	Lehigh Valley Outlawz	Away	L 38-41
June 24	Rochester Raiders	Away	L 38-51

=== 2006 GLIFL Standings ===
2006 Great Lakes Indoor Football League
Team	W	L	T	PCT
Port Huron Pirates-y	10	0	0	1.000
Rochester Raiders-x	7	3	0	.700
Lehigh Valley Outlawz-x	5	5	0	.500
Battle Creek Crunch-x	4	6	0	.400
Marion Mayhem	4	6	0	.400
New York/New Jersey Revolution	0	10	0	.000

== Roster ==
2006 Marion Mayhem roster
Quarterbacks: 2 Ted Sauder; Running backs: 9 Marcus Allen; Receivers: 9 Air'en Cabell; 86 Robert Haskins; 6 Scott Jeffries; 25 Steve Stillwell	Offensive linemen: 69 Ben Nash; 87 John VanGundy; Defensive linemen: 50 Travis Cutner; 60 Joe Kearney; 90 Paris Long; 48 Jason Patterson; 99 Shawn Williams	Linebackers: 1 Keyvon Barbee; Defensive backs: 8 Ali Grose; 22 Kodi Lindsey; 3 Karl Rose; 15 Jimmy Smith; 11 Jeremy Warner; Kickers: 14 Andy Cline	Inactive: currently vacant; Injured Reserve: currently vacant; Updated June 24, 2006; rookies in italics; 20 Active, 0 Inactive
