= Kellogg Arena =

Multi-purpose in Battle Creek, Michigan, U.S.

- Interactive map of Kellogg Arena
- Location: McCamly Square; Battle Creek, Michigan, U.S.
- Coordinates: 42.319098°N 85.185478°W
- Public transit: BCT

Construction
- Built: 1980

Tenants
- Battle Creek Knights (IBL/PBL/IBA) (2005–2012); Battle Creek Crunch (GLIFL) (2006); Battle Creek Smoke (GLAF) (2024)

Kellogg Arena is a 6,200-seat multi-purpose arena located in Battle Creek, Michigan.

== History ==
Kellogg Arena was built in 1980. It seats 4,675 for basketball games, 4,859 for ice shows, 4,433 for the circus, 1,500 for theatrical shows and concerts, 6,200 for end-stage concerts and 6,500 for center-stage concerts.

The arena, with a ceiling height of 35 feet to low steel and 47' high steel, is also a convention center, with 30,360 square feet (2,821 m^{2}) of total space, with 22,000 square feet (2,000 m^{2}) on the arena floor. There is a hospitality room holding up to 65 people and there are five dressing rooms and seven concession stands as well as a production office.

It is home to the Battle Creek Cereal Killers Roller Derby League, the former home of the Battle Creek Flight basketball team, as well as the Battle Creek Crunch of the Great Lakes Indoor Football League. It was also the home of the Battle Creek Smoke of the Great Lakes Arena Football league. Currently, it is also used for All Elite Wrestling, as WWE has an exclusivity contract with Wings Event Center in nearby Kalamazoo.

== Notable events ==
The arena hosted the 1997 Winter Cup, which was the first edition of USA Gymnastics' annual Winter Cup event. One of the two yearly selections for the United States men's national artistic gymnastics team happens directly following this competition.

On December 18, 2019, Donald Trump held a rally at Kellogg Arena, on the same day he was impeached by the House.

On September 30, 2023, professional wrestling superstar and local legend Rob Van Dam headlined the Battle In The Creek 3 at Kellogg Arena.
