= Main Street Armory =

Multi-purpose arena in Rochester, New York

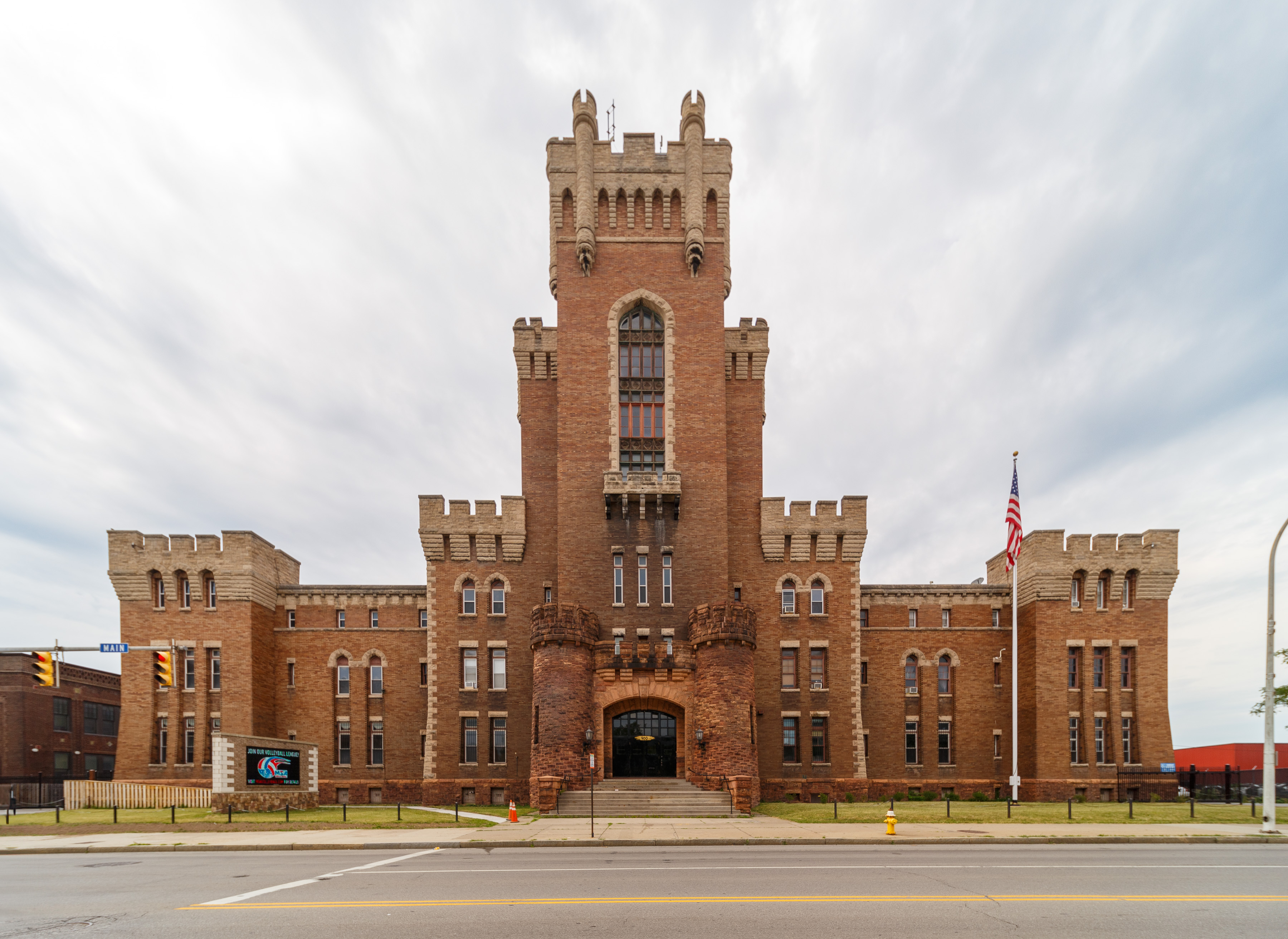
- Interactive map of Main Street Armory
- Address: 900 East Main Street; Rochester, New York; United States
- Owner: 900 E. Main Street Rochester LLC

Construction
- Built: 1905
- Renovated: 2005–2007

Tenants
- Rochester Centrals (ABL) (1925–1931); Rochester Iroquois (lacrosse); Rochester Raiders (CIFL) (2007); Next Era Wrestling (2007–2008)

Website
- www.rochestermainstreetarmory.com

The Main Street Armory is a multi-purpose arena located at 900 East Main Street in Rochester, New York. The Armory was built between 1904 and 1907 by the United States Army and was used for the training and processing of soldiers. Its main arena also hosted several non-military events, including high school basketball, circuses, and auto shows prior to the mid-1950s. In 1990, the New York National Guard left the facility, leaving it vacant and allowing it to fall into disrepair. It was purchased and renovated in the mid-2000s with the intention of refurbishing the Armory's main arena to hold events once again. The building opened for this purpose on February 3, 2007.

It was the home of the Rochester Centrals of the American Basketball League from 1925 to 1931, the Rochester Iroquois lacrosse team, the Rochester Raiders of the Continental Indoor Football League in 2007, and Next Era Wrestling from 2007-2008 until it moved across the street to the Rochester Auditorium Center.

== History ==
The Armory was constructed between 1904 and 1907 by the United States Army and used for the final training and processing of war-bound (World War I and World War II) soldiers. Its use was not limited to the military, however, as its 35,000-square-foot (3,300 m^{2}) main arena (originally intended for drill exercises) was used for events of widely varying natures—ranging from professional basketball to auto shows—for most of the early to mid-20th century. The construction and opening of the Rochester Community War Memorial (now known as the Blue Cross Arena) in the 1950s brought the Armory's reign as the primary indoor venue in Rochester to an end as most of the Armory's signature tenants left the small, aging Armory for the spacious, new War Memorial 1 mile (1.6 km) to the west in the heart of downtown. The New York National Guard continued to use the Armory as a training facility until 1990, at which point the Armory became largely abandoned.

By 2005, the building had fallen into a severe state of disrepair from years of disuse and neglect. The arena floor was covered in pigeon droppings, the birds having been the building's primary occupants for fifteen years, and the building's roof, windows, and interior systems were in poor condition. In July 2005, the building was purchased at auction by local entrepreneur Scott David Donaldson. He paid only US$1,000 for the 138,000-square-foot (1,300-square-meter), 7-story building, as no one else bid for it.

Much of the non-arena portion of the building is being converted into office space, some of which is already filled. The basement of the building is now used as a venue for indoor paintball events and group parties.

== Events ==
The Armory's main arena was home to sporting events as early as 1925. That year, the Rochester Centrals, Rochester's first professional basketball team, began play in the American Basketball League. The team played for six seasons and made the playoffs once (in the 1929–1930 season, when they reached the league finals). After the 1930–1931 season, the league suspended operations, causing the Centrals to fold. In addition to the Centrals, the Armory also played host to high school basketball and was the home of the East High School basketball team. Walter Dukes and Al Butler—two players that went on to play in the National Basketball Association—both played at the Armory in the late 1940s and early 1950s as members of East High.

During the 1930s, the Rochester Iroquois, Rochester's first indoor lacrosse team, competed in the North American Amateur Lacrosse Association and played at the Armory. One Iroquois player of note was Jay Silverheels, better known for playing the character "Tonto" on the television series The Lone Ranger. While playing for Rochester, Silverheels went by Harry Smith, his real name.

The building also hosted many events, including circuses, concerts, balls and auto shows, prior to opening of the War Memorial in the 1950s. The Damascus Temple Shrine Circus used the Armory as its venue for performances in Rochester through 1960.

The Armory's first post-refurbishment sporting event was Next Era Wrestling's "Fatal Attraction" show on February 3, 2007. It had an attendance of 450 fans despite a major snow storm that hit that night. The main event saw World Wrestling Federation Hall of Famers Jimmy Snuka and Tito Santana in action. For the next 15 months the Armory became N.E.W.'s home venue, and such wrestling superstars such as The Latin American X-Change (Homicide and Hernandez) (L.A.X.), Koko B. Ware, Too Cool, The Heart Throbs, and Extreme Championship Wrestling legend The Sandman have since competed inside the arena. Eventually outgrowing their Gates, NY office space, Next Era Wrestling moved both offices and live events across the street to The Rochester Auditorium Center in early 2009.

The refurbished Armory's first concert event was held on February 4, 2007, a performance by O.A.R. More concerts followed later that year, as refurbishment continued. The indie rock band Modest Mouse performed there on April 26, 2007.

The main arena, refurbished to seat 6,500, was the home of the Rochester Raiders of the Continental Indoor Football League during the 2007 season. The Raiders played their inaugural season at the ESL Sports Centre, but it was considered less-than-ideal for football. At the Armory, the team could charge less for parking and provide fans with better sight lines and a closer view of the action. In return, the Raiders management expected a more energetic atmosphere thanks to the acoustics and visuals. After the 2007 season, the Raiders moved to the Blue Cross Arena, however, they planned to move back for their re-launched 2014 season, but instead returned to the Bill Gray's Regional Iceplex.

The Main Street Armory was previously a concert venue, hosting several different acts each month. On March 8, 2023, the City of Rochester revoked the Armory's license to operate after a stampede on the night of March 6 killed three and injured seven concertgoers and Donaldson refused to meet with city officials about the incident. Donaldson sold the armory shortly after the incident to a newly formed limited liability company whose owners were not initially made public. The new owner was later revealed as John Trickey, a landlord holding numerous residential properties; Linda Kingsley, a city attorney, stated that the city out of hand would not allow Trickey to operate the property and would deny any applications or licenses for the venue as long as Trickey owned it, accusing Trickey of being a slumlord. As of 2024, Trickey was continuing to work on repairs to the venue in hopes of returning it to operation.
