= Motor City Reapers =

- Founded: 2006
- League: Great Lakes Indoor Football League
- Team history: Motor City Reapers
- Based in: Fraser, Michigan
- Arena: Great Lakes Sports City Superior Arena
- Colors: Black, Gold, Silver
- Owner: Mike Zak Sr.
- President: Mike Zak Sr.
- Head coach: Edward Blackburn
- General manager: Mike Zak Jr.

The Motor City Reapers were to have been a professional indoor football team based in Fraser, Michigan. The team was slated to join the Great Lakes Indoor Football League as an expansion team in 2007. The Reapers were to have been the third indoor football team to be based in the Detroit metro area. The first was the Detroit Drive, an early member of the Arena Football League, considered to have been the sport's first dynasty, and the second was the AFL's Detroit Fury. The owner of the Reapers was to have been Mike Zak Sr. The Reapers were scheduled to play their home games at the Great Lakes Sports City Superior Arena in Fraser, Michigan.

== Franchise history ==
In June 2006, the Reapers were announced to be joining the Great Lakes Indoor Football League as an expansion team for the 2007 season. Team owner Mike Zak Sr. believed that his team would have the fortitude to stay in the area whereas the previous teams did not. However, the team never took the field, with Zak citing "personal reasons" for not playing in 2007. There was word that the team would play in 2008, but they never played a game.
