= Rayshawn Askew =

American gridiron football player (born 1979)

No. 20
- Position: Running back / Wide receiver

Personal information
- Born: March 28, 1979 (age 47)
- Listed height: 6 ft 1 in (1.85 m)
- Listed weight: 255 lb (116 kg)

Career information
- High school: Cincinnati (OH) Winton Woods
- College: Elizabeth City State
- NFL draft: 2002: undrafted

Career history
- Lincoln Capitols (2002); Winnipeg Blue Bombers (2003); Ohio Valley Greyhounds (2004); Cincinnati Marshalls (2005); Port Huron Pirates (2006); Lexington Horsemen (2007); Team Michigan (2008)*; Cincinnati Commandos (2011); Dayton Silverbacks (2012)*
- * Offseason or practice squad member only

Awards and highlights
- 2 x NIFL All Star; 2006 GLIFL Running Back of the Year; GLIFL Champion; UIF All Star

Rayshawn Askew (born March 28, 1979) is an American former professional football running back. He played in the National Indoor Football League, Continental Indoor Football League and United Indoor Football.

== College career ==
After planning on going to Purdue University, he decided against it after head coach, Jim Colletto resigned, and instead attended Elizabeth City State University. He was a four-year starter and received a bachelor's degree in Biology/Pre-Medicine, finishing with honors including a 3.6 GPA. He was a 2000 2nd Team All-Central Intercollegiate Athletic Association All-Academic honoree. Tallied 2,134 career rushing yards and led his team in rushing for three years and receiving two years despite being on a team that won just five games in four years.

== Professional career ==
Askew played with the Lincoln Capitols in 2002, and set a NIFL record with seven touchdown runs in a 120–15 win over the River City Renegades in 2002. He finished that season with 903 rushing yards and 22 touchdowns, and added 126 yards and two scores in a playoff game against Billings.

In 2003, Askew returned to outdoor football by signing with the Winnipeg Blue Bombers of the CFL.

In 2004, Askew returned to the NIFL with the Ohio Valley Greyhounds. He led the league with 1,047 yards on 215 carries with 31 touchdowns, being named an NIFL All-Star Running Back.

In 2005, he played for the Cincinnati Marshalls of the NIFL. Askew broke or tied many league records that year en route to being named an All-Star. He tied the single season touchdown record of 46 when he scored three touchdowns against Wyoming on July 4, 2005. The three touchdowns allowed Askew to set a new league record for scoring with 282 points, overcoming the mark of 276 points set by Baron Dockery of the Ohio Valley Greyhounds in 2002. Askew finished the regular season leading the league in scoring (282 points), touchdowns (46), rushing yards (719 yards) and all-purpose yards (2236 yards).

In 2006, he joined the Port Huron Pirates, an expansion team that was joining the newly formed Great Lakes Indoor Football League. He went on to lead the Pirates to a 10–0 regular season record, recording 144 carries for 651 yards and 32 touchdowns, and aided in a 2006 Great Lakes Bowl I championship. He was named MVP of the championship game racking up 15 carries for 52 yards as well as 3 touchdowns. He was also named Running Back of the Year for the league

In 2007, he ran for the Lexington Horsemen of the United Indoor Football. He had a monsterious season, rushing for 799 yards and 29 touchdowns, receiving 46 passes for 321 yards and 9 touchdowns, as well as throwing a single pass for a touchdown. He was voted into the 2007 UIF Casey's All Star Classic.

In the 2008 AAFL draft, it was announced that Askew had been drafted Team Michigan of the newly formed, All American Football League. He was the 14th round pick by Michigan and the 80th pick overall. The league however, never played a single game, as the launch of the league was constantly put off.

In 2011 Askew was signed by the Cincinnati Commandos of the CIFL, formerly the GLIFL, which he played for in 2006. He played in the team's final regular season game where he posted 9 carries for 28 yards and 0 touchdowns.

Askew signed with the Dayton Silverbacks of the CIFL for 2012, where he was going to be coached by his brother, Mister Askew. Just weeks before the season started, the Silverbacks had let Mister go as their head coach, and Rayshawn decided to part ways as well.

== Personal life ==
Askew also has family ties that extend into the NFL and college football ranks. His brother is running back B. J. Askew, who played for the New York Jets and was drafted out of the University of Michigan in 2003. Rayshawn's oldest brother Mister Askew, is currently the running back coach at Bethany College (West Virginia). Mister Askew played football for Alabama A&M and Elizabeth City State University. Rayshawn also has two cousins, Matthias Askew (Michigan State University) and Tab Perry (UCLA) both who played for the Cincinnati Bengals.
