= Rochester Raiders =

American indoor football team

Logo

General information
- Founded: 2006
- Folded: 2014
- Headquartered: Brighton, New York at Bill Gray's Regional Iceplex
- Colors: Silver, Black

Personnel
- Head coach: Jeff Cooper (2006-2010) Mark Thurston (2014

Team history
- Rochester Raiders (2006–2010, 2014)

Home fields
- ESL Sports Centre (2006); Main Street Armory (2007–2008); Dome Arena (2009–2010); Marina Auto Stadium (2010); Bill Gray's Regional Iceplex (2014)

League / conference affiliations
- Great Lakes/Continental Indoor Football League (2006–2008): Atlantic Division (2007); Atlantic Conference (2008); West Division (2008); Indoor Football League (2009–2010): United Conference (2009); Atlantic Division (2009); Atlantic East Division (2010); American Indoor Football (2014)

Championships
- League championships: 1: CIFL: 2007
- Division championships: 1: CIFL: 2007

Playoff appearances (6)
- GL/CIFL: 2006, 2007, 2008 IFL: 2009, 2010 AIF: 2014

The Rochester Raiders were a professional indoor football team based in the Rochester, New York area. They played their home games at Bill Gray's Regional Iceplex in Rochester. The Raiders were previously a member of the Continental Indoor Football League from 2006 to 2008 and the American Indoor Football Association for two exhibition matches in 2008. In 2014, the Raiders came back and played as a member of American Indoor Football (AIF).

The Raiders played in the CIFL championship game twice, both times against the Port Huron / Michigan Pirates. They lost to Port Huron in 2006 but defeated Michigan in 2007. Rochester finished the 2008 regular season undefeated at 12–0; however, the team resigned after their final regular season opponent, the Flint Phantoms, did not show for the game and forfeited.

== History ==
=== 2006 ===
The Rochester Raiders were founded in 2006 as a charter member of the newly created Great Lakes Indoor Football League (GLIFL). The Raiders derived their name from a local flag football team. There were a small number of fans concerned with copyright between the team's logo and the National Football League's Oakland Raiders. However, since the Rochester team never played in California, this was not believed to be of real concern. The Raiders were one of two 2006 teams in the GLIFL that held a television contract, at the time with WBGT-CA, a local low-power station. Games have since been moved to Time Warner Cable SportsNet.

The Raiders' first home venue was the ESL Sports Centre in Brighton (a suburb of Rochester, now known as Bill Gray's Regional Iceplex). The team's 2006 roster featured Syracuse University standout wide receiver Maurice Jackson (who won the inaugural GLIFL Wide Receiver of the Year Award), quarterback Matt Cottengim (the league's inaugural MVP), Darius Smith (the league's inaugural Return Man of the Year), and in January 2006, they signed 2-time Pro Bowler and Super Bowl XXVI Most Valuable Player Mark Rypien to a one-game contract. Rochester went 8–4 under head coach Dennis Greco (on loan from East Rochester High School) during the 2006 regular season and advanced to the postseason. However, they would ultimately fall to the Port Huron Pirates by a score of 40–34 in Great Lakes Bowl I, the GLIFL championship game. After the season, the Raiders moved from the 2,500-seat ESL Sports Centre to the 5,000-seat Main Street Armory in downtown Rochester.

==== 2006 GLIFL standings ====
2006 Great Lakes Indoor Football League
Team	W	L	T	PCT
Port Huron Pirates-y	10	0	0	1.000
Rochester Raiders-x	7	3	0	.700
Lehigh Valley Outlawz-x	5	5	0	.500
Battle Creek Crunch-x	4	6	0	.400
Marion Mayhem	4	6	0	.400
New York/New Jersey Revolution	0	10	0	.000

=== 2007 ===
In 2007, ultimately the Raiders' only season in the Armory, they finished the regular season with a 10–2 record under new head coach Eddie Long, good for first in the Atlantic Division. In the playoffs, Rochester won the CIFL championship by defeating the previously-unbeaten Michigan Pirates 37–27 in the CIFL Indoor Championship Game on July 28, 2007. Mike Condello was named the game's Most Valuable Player. The game was held at the Blue Cross Arena (a venue with roughly double the capacity of the Main Street Armory) due to a pro wrestling show which was being held at The Armory. The Raiders moved to the Blue Cross Arena full-time beginning with the 2008 season.

Date	Opponent	Home/Away	Result
March 17	Port Huron Pirates	Home	Lost 30-62
March 24	New England Surge	Home	Won 77-40
March 30	Port Huron Pirates	Away	Lost 13-60
April 14	Lehigh Valley Outlawz	Away	Won 63-25
April 21	Chesapeake Tide	Away	Won 89-49
April 28	Chesapeake Tide	Home	Won 52-16
May 5	Chicago Slaughter	Away	Won 49-40
May 19	New York/New Jersey Revolution	Home	Won 62-0
May 26	Lehigh Valley Outlawz	Home	Won 77-49
June 2	Steubenville Stampede	Home	Won 81-6
June 9	New York/New Jersey Revolution	Away	Won 56-21
June 16	New England Surge	Away	Won 49-40
July 7	Chesapeake Tide (Playoffs)	Home	Won 76-43
July 14	New England Surge (Playoffs)	Home	Won 80-45
July 28	Michigan Pirates (CIFL Indoor Championship Game)	Home (BCA)	Won 37-27

==== 2007 CIFL standings ====
2007 Continental Indoor Football League
Team	Overall				Division			
Team	W	L	T	PCT	W	L	T	PCT
Great Lakes Conference
Michigan Pirates-y	12	0	0	1.000	10	0	0	1.000
Kalamazoo Xplosion-x	10	2	0	.833	10	2	0	.833
Chicago Slaughter-x	9	3	0	.750	8	2	0	.800
Marion Mayhem-x	6	6	0	.500	6	5	0	.545
Muskegon Thunder-x	4	8	0	.333	4	7	0	.364
Miami Valley Silverbacks	4	8	0	.333	3	7	0	.300
Summit County Rumble	1	11	0	.083	0	7	0	.000
Springfield Stallions	0	12	0	.000	0	11	0	.000
Atlantic Conference
Rochester Raiders-y	10	2	0	.833	90	0	0	1.000
New England Surge-x	8	4	0	.667	8	3	0	.727
Lehigh Valley Outlawz-x	7	5	0	.583	5	5	0	.500
Chesapeake Tide-x	7	5	0	.583	6	5	0	.545
Steubenville Stampede	5	7	0	.417	2	6	0	.250
NY/NJ Revolution	1	11	0	.083	0	11	0	.000

=== 2008 ===
Rochester kept most of its championship-caliber core together, re-signing quarterbacks Mike Mikolaichik, Matt Cottingem, and Omar Baker; running backs Jamil Porter and Dee Glanton; wide receivers Maurice Jackson, Chris Carter, Noah Fahrenbauch, and Derrick Dyer; offensive linemen Mike Kallfeltz and Eric Jendryaszek; linebackers Jason Coley and James Vann; defensive linemen Mike Condello, Terrence Dawson, Steve Marriott, and Tom Parks; defensive backs Chris Shaw, Darius Smith, Makis Whitaker, and Jeff Richardson; and kicker Adam Lanctot. The team also added tight end / defensive end TJ Cottrell (son of Ted Cottrell), wide receiver Darryl Fragger, running back Felix Joyner, defensive lineman Steve Fleming (all three from Port Huron), running back / wide receiver Mark Bly and linebacker Brenton Brady (both from Miami Valley) by way of free agency.

The mix of holdovers from the 2007 club with players from free agency proved to be a winning combination as the team was wildly successful in 2008. They finished the regular season undefeated (12–0; 11–0 in contested games) and won their second straight division title (but first in the Atlantic West Division). However, the Raiders withdrew from the CIFL playoffs on June 8, 2008, after the Flint Phantoms failed to show up for a Sunday afternoon game. The team then immediately moved to the American Indoor Football Association, and played two exhibition matches there, but then announced a move to the Indoor Football League instead.

Date	Opponent	Home/Away	Result
March 21	Chesapeake Tide	Away	Won 43-36
March 29	Lehigh Valley Outlawz	Home	Won 49-27
April 5	Marion Mayhem	Away	Won 52-19
April 12	New Jersey Revolution	Home	Won 49-3
April 19	Saginaw Sting	Home	Won 59-43
April 26	New Jersey Revolution	Away	Won 59-16
May 3	New England Surge	Home	Won 62-20
May 10	Lehigh Valley Outlawz	Away	Won 45-26
May 17	Chesapeake Tide	Home	Won 58-13
May 24	Flint Phantoms	Away	Won 35-12
May 31	New England Surge	Away	Won 52-25
June 8	Flint Phantoms	Home	Won Forfeit

==== 2008 CIFL standings ====
2008 Continental Indoor Football League
Team	Overall				Division			
Team	W	L	T	PCT	W	L	T	PCT
Great Lakes Conference
East Division
Kalamazoo Xplosion-y	11	1	0	.917	5	1	0	.833
Muskegon Thunder-x	5	7	0	.417	2	2	0	.500
Fort Wayne Freedom	5	7	0	.417	2	4	0	.333
Miami Valley Silverbacks	3	9	0	.250	1	2	0	.333
West Division
Chicago Slaughter-y	8	4	0	.667	3	1	0	.750
Rock River Raptors-x	7	5	0	.583	3	1	0	.750
Milwaukee Bonecrushers	1	11	0	.083	0	4	0	.000
Atlantic Conference
East Division
New England Surge-y	8	3	0	.727	5	1	0	.833
Lehigh Valley Outlawz-x	7	5	0	.583	4	2	0	.667
New Jersey Revolution	3	9	0	.250	2	5	0	.286
Chesapeake Tide	2	10	0	.583	0	2	0	.000
West Division
Rochester Raiders-z	12	0	0	1.000	4	0	0	1.000
Saginaw Sting-y	10	2	0	.833	3	1	0	.750
Marion Mayhem-x	7	5	0	.583	0	2	0	.000
Flint Phantoms	1	11	0	.083	0	4	0	.000

=== 2009 ===
In December 2009, Rochester businessman Bob Bartosiewicz sold his majority share in the team to minority owner and team founder Dave McCarthy; Bartosiewicz, who had backed out of a plan to bring an af2 franchise to nearby Buffalo the year prior, had lost millions of dollars on the Raiders during the team's existence. McCarthy announced that the team would be playing its 2010 home games at the Dome Arena in Henrietta, which has 2,164 seats—the lowest seating capacity of any IFL team, and lower than the previous arenas they used in the GLIFL and CIFL.

=== 2010 ===
On April 23, 2010, McCarthy announced that he was looking to sell part of the team. On June 5, 2010, the Raiders hosted the first outdoor IFL game against the Chicago Slaughter at Marina Auto Stadium. The Raiders won that game 43-36.

=== 2011 ===
In November 2010, the Rochester Raiders announced its cessation of operations.

Professional indoor football would return to the city in 2013, with the announcement of the independent Roc City Thunder taking up residence in the city.

=== 2014 ===
For the 2014 season the Rochester Raiders began play in the American Indoor Football League. After initially announcing plans to return to the Main Street Armory, a scheduling issue prompted the team to instead return to Bill Gray's.

The Raiders suspended operations after the 2014 season with the intent of returning in 2016. The Raiders never returned and a new team called the Rochester Kings would start play in 2017.

== Season-by-season record ==
Season records
Season	W	L	T	Finish	Playoff results
Rochester Raiders (GLIFL)
2006	8	4	0	2nd League	Won Semifinal (Lehigh Valley); Lost Great Lakes Bowl I (Port Huron)
Rochester Raiders (CIFL)
2007	10	2	0	1st Atlantic	Won AD Semifinal (Chesapeake); Won AD Championship (New England); Won CIFL Indoor Championship Game (Michigan)
2008	12	0	0	1st Atlantic West	Quit league
Rochester Raiders (IFL)
2009	10	4	0	2nd United Atlantic	Lost Divisionals I (River City)
2010	9	5	0	2nd Atlantic East	Won Round 1 (Richmond); Lost Conference Semi-Final (Wichita)
Rochester Raiders (AIF)
2014	4	4	0	3rd AIF League	Lost Round 1 (Baltimore Mariners)
Totals	58	23	0	(including playoffs)	

== Notable players ==
Mark Rypien (2006)
