= Steubenville Stampede =

U.S. indoor football franchise

Logo

General information
- Founded: 2005
- Folded: 2007
- Headquartered: St. John Arena in Steubenville, Ohio
- Colors: Orange, Black, Silver

Personnel
- Head coach: Demetrius Ross

Team history
- Steubenville Stampede (2006–2007)

Home fields
- St. John Arena (2006–2007)

League / conference affiliations
- American Indoor Football League (2006): North Conference (2006); Continental Indoor Football League (2007): Atlantic Division (2007)

The Steubenville Stampede was an indoor football franchise, most recently a member of the Continental Indoor Football League. They played their home games at the St. John Arena in Steubenville, Ohio, United States.

== 2006 season ==
The team began play in 2006 as an expansion member of the American Indoor Football League. On March 4, 2006, the Stampede lost their inaugural home-opener 21–14 against the Johnstown Riverhawks, which became the lowest scoring game in the AIFL's two-year existence.

The inaugural season roster was notable for having two future murderers. Both Thunder Collins and Bobby Cutts Jr. were active players during the season. Each were both convicted of murder for separate incidents that took place after their time with the team.

== 2007 season ==
After the 2006 season, the team decided to move to the CIFL. The Stampede were sold to Summit County Rumble owner Ramone Davenport in January 2007.

The team, although starting the season 4–0, were struggling business-wise, and at one point almost folded, but later on were purchased by Martin D. Maiuri and finished the season. The team would only win one of their remaining eight games, finishing the season 5–7 and two games out of the playoffs.

Finally, on June 28, 2007, the CIFL took over and ceased operations of the Steubenville and Summit County franchises.

== Season-by-season ==
Season records
Season	W	L	T	Finish	Playoff results
Steubenville Stampede (AIFL)
2006	1	11	0	7th Northern	Only games played (1-1 in forfeits)
Steubenville Stampede (CIFL)
2007	5	7	0	5th Atlantic	--
Totals	6	18	0		

== 2006 season schedule ==
Only 12 games played on field. One forfeit win and one forfeit loss not included

Date	Opponent	Home/Away	Result
February 25	Canton Legends	Away	Loss 33–66
March 4	Johnstown Riverhawks	Home	Loss 14–21
March 13	Reading Express	Home	Loss 35–53
March 25	Miami Valley Silverbacks	Home	Loss 54–57
March 31	Erie Freeze	Away	Loss 6–62
April 8	Syracuse Soldiers	Home	Loss 31–43
April 15	Canton Legends	Home	Loss 26–62
April 29	Miami Valley Silverbacks	Away	Loss 28–73
May 6	Erie Freeze	Home	Loss 18–61
May 20	Miami Valley Silverbacks	Away	Loss 21–40
May 27	Johnstown Riverhawks	Away	Loss 21–68
June 10	Columbus Blackhawks (non-league)	Home	Win 56–20

== 2007 season schedule ==
Date	Opponent	Home/Away	Result
March 24	NY/NJ Revolution	Home	Won 70–3
April 5	Summit County Rumble	Home	Won 42–6
April 13	Chesapeake Tide	Home	Won 65–55
April 20	Summit County Rumble	Home	Won 89–32
April 28	Lehigh Valley Outlawz	Away	Lost 57–64
May 5	New England Surge	Home	Lost 30–43
May 12	Springfield Stallions	Home	Won 66–8
May 18	Miami Valley Silverbacks	Away	Lost 44–66
May 26	New England Surge	Away	Lost 0–86
June 2	Rochester Raiders	Away	Lost 6–81
June 16	Lehigh Valley Outlawz	Home	Lost 20–54
June 23	Chesapeake Tide	Away	Lost 24–64

=== 2007 CIFL standings ===
2007 Continental Indoor Football League
Team	Overall				Division			
Team	W	L	T	PCT	W	L	T	PCT
Great Lakes Conference
Michigan Pirates-y	12	0	0	1.000	10	0	0	1.000
Kalamazoo Xplosion-x	10	2	0	.833	10	2	0	.833
Chicago Slaughter-x	9	3	0	.750	8	2	0	.800
Marion Mayhem-x	6	6	0	.500	6	5	0	.545
Muskegon Thunder-x	4	8	0	.333	4	7	0	.364
Miami Valley Silverbacks	4	8	0	.333	3	7	0	.300
Summit County Rumble	1	11	0	.083	0	7	0	.000
Springfield Stallions	0	12	0	.000	0	11	0	.000
Atlantic Conference
Rochester Raiders-y	10	2	0	.833	90	0	0	1.000
New England Surge-x	8	4	0	.667	8	3	0	.727
Lehigh Valley Outlawz-x	7	5	0	.583	5	5	0	.500
Chesapeake Tide-x	7	5	0	.583	6	5	0	.545
Steubenville Stampede	5	7	0	.417	2	6	0	.250
NY/NJ Revolution	1	11	0	.083	0	11	0	.000
