= Port Huron Pirates =

American indoor football team

Logo

General information
- Founded: 2005
- Folded: 2007
- Headquartered: McMorran Arena in Flint, Michigan
- Colors: Black, Blue, White

Personnel
- Owner: Dan Pilgrim (2006) Peter Norager (Bought Team in 2007)
- Head coach: Brian Hug (2006); Karl Featherstone (2007)
- President: Josh Reasoner

Team history
- Port Huron Pirates (2006–2007); Michigan Pirates (2007)

Home fields
- McMorran Arena (2006–2007); Perani Arena and Event Center (2007 playoffs)

League / conference affiliations
- Great Lakes/Continental Indoor Football League (2006–2007): Great Lakes Conference (2007)

Championships
- League championships: 1: 2006
- Conference championships: 1: 2007

Playoff appearances (2)
- 2006, 2007

The Port Huron Pirates were a professional indoor football team based in Port Huron, Michigan. The team was a charter member of the Great Lakes Indoor Football League (GLIFL) joining the league in 2006 as an expansion team. The Pirates were the first professional indoor football team to be based in Port Huron. They played their home games at McMorran Arena in Port Huron, Michigan.

The Pirates are the only team to never lose a regular season game in the history of the Continental Indoor Football League, going 22–0 for the only two years that the team existed.

== Franchise history ==
=== 2006 ===
In their inaugural season, Pirates owner hired Brian Hug to be the head coach. the Pirates went undefeated (10–0), defeated the Battle Creek Crunch in the semifinals, and won the inaugural Great Lakes Bowl I 40–34 over the Rochester Raiders, with RB Rayshawn Askew winning the game's MVP title. Over 2,500 fans witnessed the game, marking one of the biggest crowds to watch a sporting event at McMorran Place. Adding some more great news was that QB Shane Franzer was named the inaugural GLIFL MVP of the All-Star game and Rayshawn Askew was named the inaugural GLIFL Running Back of the Year.

==== Standings ====
2006 Great Lakes Indoor Football League
Team	W	L	T	PCT
Port Huron Pirates-y	10	0	0	1.000
Rochester Raiders-x	7	3	0	.700
Lehigh Valley Outlawz-x	5	5	0	.500
Battle Creek Crunch-x	4	6	0	.400
Marion Mayhem	4	6	0	.400
New York/New Jersey Revolution	0	10	0	.000

=== 2007 ===
After the season, head coach Brian Hug left the Pirates to become head coach of the Pahrump Valley High School football team. The Pirates went on to promote assistant Karl Featherstone as their new head coach. In March 2007, Hug was hired by the Las Vegas Gladiators as an assistant offensive/defensive line coach. Featherstone got the team off to a fast start as they defeated the Miami Valley Silverbacks, 54–7, en route to another perfect regular season.

Unfortunately, at halftime of the May 26 game against Marion, in front of an announced crowd of 1,216 fans, the team announced this would be their final season in Port Huron, as they could no longer pay the bills with such lackluster attendance. Speculated relocation cities included Binghamton, New York, Flint, Michigan, and one other Michigan city.

Afterwards, the team announced they would be playing their playoff games at the Perani Arena and Event Center in Flint, Michigan. They were using the playoffs as a test of the arena and the city of Flint for potential relocation. They then renamed themselves The Michigan Pirates for the rest of the season.

After winning their first 26 games, the team finally met their Waterloo in the 2007 CIFL Indoor Championship Game, losing to long-time rival Rochester Raiders by a score of 37–27 at Rochester's Blue Cross Arena.

After an offseason of uncertainty regarding whether the team would return, the CIFL moved the Port Huron Pirates from the "Active Teams" section of their message board to the "Defunct Teams" section of their message board, indicating the team has left the league. It was later confirmed by league officials that The Pirates were no more, as Peter Norager sold the team to the owner of Perani Arena and the team was renamed the Flint Phantoms.

==== Schedule ====
Date	Opponent	Home/Away	Result
March 17	Rochester Raiders	Away	Won 62–30
March 24	Miami Valley Silverbacks	Home	Won 54–7
March 30	Rochester Raiders	Home	Won 60–13
April 14	Springfield Stallions	Away	Won 54–6
April 21	Muskegon Thunder	Away	Won 47–13
April 28	Summit County Rumble	Home	Won 70–34
May 4	Miami Valley Silverbacks	Away	Won 78–19
May 12	Muskegon Thunder	Home	Won 76–37
May 19	Summit County Rumble	Away	Won 63–0
May 26	Marion Mayhem	Home	Won 56–9
June 8	Kalamazoo Xplosion	Home	Won 55–20
June 16	Chicago Slaughter	Away	Won 46–12
July 7	Marion Mayhem (Playoffs)	Home (Flint)	Won 70-20
July 13	Kalamazoo Xplosion (Playoffs)	Home (Flint)	Won 37–29
July 28	Rochester Raiders (CIFL Indoor Championship Game)	Away	Lost 27–37

==== Standings ====
2007 Continental Indoor Football League
Team	Overall				Division			
Team	W	L	T	PCT	W	L	T	PCT
Great Lakes Conference
Michigan Pirates-y	12	0	0	1.000	10	0	0	1.000
Kalamazoo Xplosion-x	10	2	0	.833	10	2	0	.833
Chicago Slaughter-x	9	3	0	.750	8	2	0	.800
Marion Mayhem-x	6	6	0	.500	6	5	0	.545
Muskegon Thunder-x	4	8	0	.333	4	7	0	.364
Miami Valley Silverbacks	4	8	0	.333	3	7	0	.300
Summit County Rumble	1	11	0	.083	0	7	0	.000
Springfield Stallions	0	12	0	.000	0	11	0	.000
Atlantic Conference
Rochester Raiders-y	10	2	0	.833	90	0	0	1.000
New England Surge-x	8	4	0	.667	8	3	0	.727
Lehigh Valley Outlawz-x	7	5	0	.583	5	5	0	.500
Chesapeake Tide-x	7	5	0	.583	6	5	0	.545
Steubenville Stampede	5	7	0	.417	2	6	0	.250
NY/NJ Revolution	1	11	0	.083	0	11	0	.000

== Logos and uniforms ==
The logo featured a fierce pirate, symbolic of the surrounding Great Lake Huron. In the background is a depiction of the Fort Gratiot Lighthouse.

== Awards and honors ==
The following is a list of all Port Huron/Michigan Pirates players who won GLIFL/CIFL Awards.

Season	Award	Player	Position
2006	Running Back of the Year	Rayshawn Askew	RB
2006	Defensive Player of the Year	Eddie Bynes	DE
2006	Great Lakes Bowl I MVP	Rayshawn Askew	RB
2006	GLIFL All-Star Game MVP	Shane Franzer	QB
2007	Most Valuable Player	Robert Height	RB
2007	Offensive Player of the Year	Robert Height	RB
2007	Defensive Player of the Year	Eddie Bynes	DE

== Head coaches ==
Name	Term	Regular season				Playoffs		Awards
Name	Term	W	L	T	Win%	W	L	Awards
Brian Hug	2006	10	0	0	1.000	2	0	Coach of the Year
Karl Featherstone	2007	12	0	0	1.000	2	1	Coach of the Year

== Season-by-season results ==
League champions	Conference champions	Division champions	Wild card berth	League leader

Season	Team	League	Conference	Division	Regular season				Postseason results
Season	Team	League	Conference	Division	Finish	Wins	Losses	Ties	Postseason results
2006	2006	GLIFL			1st	10	0	0	Won GLIFL semifinals (Crunch) 74-3; Won Great Lakes Bowl I (Raiders) 40-34
2007	2007	CIFL		Great Lakes	1st	12	0	0	Won Division Semifinals (Mayhem) 70-20; Won Division Championships (Xplosion) 37-29; Lost 2007 CIFL Championship Game (Raiders) 27-37
Totals						22	0	0	All-time regular season record (2006-2007)
Totals						4	1	-	All-time postseason record (2006-2007)
Totals						26	1	0	All-time regular season and postseason record (2006-2007)
