= Battle Creek Crunch =

Sports team

Logo

General information
- Founded: 2005
- Folded: 2006
- Headquartered: Kellogg Arena in Battle Creek, Michigan
- Colors: Black, Orange, White

Personnel
- Owner: Mike Powell
- General manager: Mike Powell
- Head coach: Bob Kubiak

Team history
- Battle Creek Crunch (2006)

Home fields
- Kellogg Arena (2006)

League / conference affiliations
- Great Lakes Indoor Football League (2006)

Playoff appearances (1)
- 2006

The Battle Creek Crunch were a professional indoor football team based in Battle Creek, Michigan. The team was a charter member of the Great Lakes Indoor Football League joining the league in 2006 as an expansion team. The Crunch were the first professional indoor football team to be based in Battle Creek. The Crunch were owned by Mike Powell. They played their home games at the Kellogg Arena in Battle Creek, Michigan.

== Franchise history ==
The Crunch were announced to the City of Battle Creek in September 2005 that they would begin play in 2006 as an expansion team in the newly formed Great Lakes Indoor Football League by owner and general manager, Mike Powell. On September 27, 2005 the team named Bob Kubiak as their head coach. The Battle Creek Crunch office is officially open to the public on January 16. In their first ever game, the Port Huron Pirates defeated the Crunch by the score of 62-22. The team was also featured on ESPN.com, as writer Ted Kluck tried out for the team. He participated in the first game as a long snapper for two extra point attempts. Kluck wrote a book called, Paper Tiger which captured the entire 2006 season from a player's prospective. Despite the team's lackluster 4-6 record, the team qualified for the playoffs as the league's 4th and final seed. The team was eliminated from the playoffs by the Port Huron Pirates by a score of 74-3. Despite the team's struggles on and off the field, Eric Gardner was named the inaugural GLIFL Defensive Back of the Year.

=== 2006 GLIFL standings ===
2006 Great Lakes Indoor Football League
Team	W	L	T	PCT
Port Huron Pirates-y	10	0	0	1.000
Rochester Raiders-x	7	3	0	.700
Lehigh Valley Outlawz-x	5	5	0	.500
Battle Creek Crunch-x	4	6	0	.400
Marion Mayhem	4	6	0	.400
New York/New Jersey Revolution	0	10	0	.000

Even though they hoped to play in 2007, financial troubles and the forming of the Kalamazoo Xplosion marked the end of the Crunch's only year of existence.

== Logos ==
The team name refers to Battle Creek's position as the corporate headquarters of the Kellogg's cereal company. The tiger in the logo is derivative of Tony the Tiger.

== Players of note ==
=== Roster ===
Battle Creek Crunch roster
Quarterbacks: 14 Ken Kubiak; 7 Tim Kubiak; Running backs: 2 Chesaurae Rhodes; Wide receivers: 4 Richard Gills; 15 Brian Wright	Offensive linemen: 61 Kyle Lacksheide; -- Chris Gillette; Defensive linemen: 37 Anthony Allsbury; 87 Chris Montgomery; 92 Harry Petaway; Linebackers: 25 Ted Kluck	Defensive backs: 1 Shawn Blackmon; 10 Eric Gardner; 27 Herb Haygood; 5 L. J. Parker; 6 Chris Roberson; Kickers: 18 Brent Selent	Injured reserve: currently vacant; Exempt list: currently vacant; Practice squad: currently vacant; rookies in italics updated June 24, 2006; 18 Active, 0 Inactive, 0 PS

=== Awards and honors ===
The following is a list of all Battle Creek Crunch players who won GLIFL awards.

Season	Award	Player	Position
2006	Defensive Back of the Year	Eric Gardner	WR/DB

== Coaches of note ==
Name	Term	Regular season				Playoffs		Awards
Name	Term	W	L	T	Win%	W	L	Awards
Bob Kubiak	2006	4	6	0	.400	0	1	

== Season-by-season results ==
League champions	Conference champions	Division champions	Wild card berth	League leader

Season	Team	League	Conference	Division	Regular season				Postseason results
Season	Team	League	Conference	Division	Finish	Wins	Losses	Ties	Postseason results
2006	2006	GLIFL				4	6	0	Lost GLIFL semifinals (Pirates) 3–74
Totals						4	6	0	All-time regular season record (2006)
Totals						0	1	-	All-time postseason record (2006)
Totals						4	7	0	All-time regular season and postseason record (2006)
