= CIFL championship game =

Annual American indoor football game

The CIFL championship game was the annual championship game of the Continental Indoor Football League (CIFL). In 2006, it was the meeting of the two semifinal game winners. Following the 2007 and 2008 season, the game was between the Great Lakes Division champion and the Atlantic Division champion. In 2009 the league was divided into an East and West Division.

During its first year, it was called the Great Lakes Bowl.

== Past CIFL championships ==
Game	Year	Winning team		Losing team		Site	Date	MVP
Great Lakes Bowl I	2006	Port Huron Pirates	40	Rochester Raiders	34	McMorran Arena	July 22, 2006	Rayshawn Askew
CIFL Indoor championship game	2007	Rochester Raiders	37	Michigan Pirates	27	Blue Cross Arena	July 28, 2007	Mike Condello
CIFL championship game	2008	Saginaw Sting	41	Kalamazoo Xplosion	37	Wings Stadium	June 29, 2008	Nick Body
CIFL championship game	2009	Chicago Slaughter	58	Fort Wayne Freedom	48	Sears Centre	June 27, 2009	Donovan Morgan
CIFL championship game	2010	Cincinnati Commandos	54	Wisconsin Wolfpack	40	Cincinnati Gardens	June 26, 2010	Ben Mauk
CIFL championship game	2011	Cincinnati Commandos	44	Marion Blue Racers	29	Cincinnati Gardens	June 11, 2011	Tyler Sheehan
CIFL championship game	2012	Saginaw Sting	35	Dayton Silverbacks	7	Dow Event Center	June 2, 2012	Jeff Austin
CIFL championship game	2013	Erie Explosion	37	Saginaw Sting	36	Erie Insurance Arena	May 12, 2013	Richard Stokes
CIFL championship game	2014	Erie Explosion	38	Marion Blue Racers	26	Veterans Memorial Coliseum	May 18, 2014	

== Number of appearances ==
Team	Appearances	Wins	Losses
Kalamazoo Xplosion	1	0	1
Port Huron/Michigan Pirates	2	1	1
Rochester Raiders	2	1	1
Saginaw Sting	3	2	1
Chicago Slaughter	1	1	0
Fort Wayne Freedom	1	0	1
Cincinnati Commandos	2	2	0
Wisconsin Wolfpack	1	0	1
Marion Blue Racers	2	0	2
Dayton Silverbacks	1	0	1
Erie Explosion	2	2	0

== Box scores ==
=== Great Lakes Bowl I: Rochester Raiders vs. Port Huron Pirates ===
Great Lakes Bowl I: Rochester Raiders at Port Huron Pirates – Game summary

Quarter	1	2	3	4	Total
Raiders	14	7	0	13	34
Pirates	14	13	5	8	40

at McMorran Arena, Port Huron, Michigan

- Date: July 22
- Game time: 7:30 p.m. EDT
- Game attendance: 2,575
- Referee: Jack Butler

Game information

1st quarter

- Rochester - (13:09) Maurice Jackson 32-yard pass from Matt Cottengim (Ryan DeCamp kick), Rochester 7-0
- Port Huron – (10:13) Rayshawn Askew 2-yard rush (Anthony Gallagher kick), 7–7
- Rochester - (6:58) Matt Cottengim 14-yard rush (Ryan DeCamp kick), Rochester 14-7
- Port Huron – (4:15) Darryl Frager 22-yard pass from Shane Franzer (Anthony Gallagher kick), 14–14

2nd quarter

- Rochester - (12:34) Maurice Jackson 1-yard pass from Matt Cottengim (Ryan DeCamp kick), Rochester 21-14
- Port Huron – (8:53) Rayshawn Askew 1-yard rush (Anthony Gallagher rush fumbled), Rochester 21–20
- Port Huron – (3:47) Shane Franzer 1-yard rush (Anthony Gallagher kick), Port Huron 27–21

3rd quarter

- Port Huron – (9:05) Eddie Bynes safety, Port Huron 29–21
- Port Huron – (4:41) Anthony Gallagher 27-yard field goal, Port Huron 32–21

4th quarter

- Rochester - (11:30) Noah Fehrenbach 22-yard pass from Matt Cottengim (Noah Fehrenbach pass failed), Port Huron 32-27
- Port Huron – (6:56) Rayshawn Askew 16-yard rush (Chris Bell rush), Port Huron 40–27
- Rochester - (0:43) Mike Kallfelz 1-yard pass from Matt Cottengim (Ryan DeCamp kick), Port Huron 40-34

Passing

- Rochester – Matt Cottengim: 15/29, 140 yards, 4 TD
- Port Huron – Shane Franzer: 7/11, 123 yards, 1 TD

Rushing

- Rochester – Reginald Cox: 12 att, 29 yards, 0 TD
- Port Huron – Rayshawn Askew: 15 att, 52 yards, 3 TD

Receiving

- Rochester – Maurice Jackson: 8 rec, 65 yards, 2 TD
- Port Huron – Robert Height: 3 rec, 48 yards, 0 TD

=== 2007 CIFL championship game: Michigan Pirates vs. Rochester Raiders ===
2007 CIFL championship game: Michigan Pirates at Rochester Raiders – Game summary

Quarter	1	2	3	4	Total
Pirates	7	3	7	10	27
Raiders	0	17	14	6	37

at Blue Cross Arena, Rochester, New York

- Date: July 28
- Game time: 7:30 p.m. EDT
- Game attendance: 5,236
- Referee: Dave Scott

Game information

1st quarter

- Port Huron – (4:08) Darryl Frager 7-yard pass from Shane Franzer (Anthony Gallagher kick), Port Huron 7–0

2nd quarter

- Rochester - (14:45) Maurice Jackson 8-yard rush (Adam Lanctot kick), 7-7
- Port Huron – (4:48) Anthony Gallagher 43-yard field goal, Port Huron 10–7
- Rochester - (3:58) Maurice Jackson 24-yard pass from Mike Mikolaichik (Adam Lanctot kick), Rochester 14-10
- Rochester – (0:00) Adam Lanctot 13-yard field goal, Rochester 17–10

3rd quarter

- Rochester - (9:41) Maurice Jackson 23-yard pass from Mike Mikolaichik (Adam Lanctot kick), Rochester 24-10
- Port Huron – (4:03) Robert Height 6-yard rush (Anthony Gallagher kick), Rochester 24–17
- Rochester - (1:36) Noah Fehrenbach 0-yard fumble recovery (Adam Lanctot kick), Rochester 31-17

4th quarter

- Port Huron – (12:07) Felix Joyner 3-yard rush (Anthony Gallagher kick), Rochester 31–24
- Rochester – (6:26) Adam Lanctot 27-yard field goal, Rochester 34–24
- Port Huron – (1:38) Anthony Gallagher 19-yard field goal, Port Huron 34–27
- Rochester – (0:57) Adam Lanctot 17-yard field goal, Rochester 37–27

Passing

- Port Huron – Shane Franzer: 8/15, 73 yards, 1 TD
- Rochester – Mike Mikolaichik: 10/15, 113 yards, 3 TD

Rushing

- Port Huron – Robert Height: 17 att, 64 yards, 1 TD
- Rochester – Jamil Porter: 8 att, 20 yards, 0 TD

Receiving

- Port Huron – Darryl Frager: 3 rec, 35 yards, 1 TD
- Rochester – Maurice Jackson: 3 rec, 73 yards, 2 TD

=== 2008 CIFL championship game: Saginaw Sting vs. Kalamazoo Xplosion ===
2008 CIFL championship game: Saginaw Sting at Kalamazoo Xplosion – Game summary

Quarter	1	2	3	4	Total
Sting	7	13	7	14	41
Xplosion	7	13	7	10	37

at Wings Stadium, Kalamazoo, Michigan

- Date: June 29
- Game time: 7:30 p.m. EDT
- Game attendance: 3,294

Game information

1st quarter

- Saginaw – (12:34) Nick Body 14-yard pass from Damon Dowdell (Anthony Gallagher kick), Saginaw 7–0
- Kalamazoo - (7:00) Eric Gardner 3-yard pass from Randy Hutchinson (Brad Selent kick), 7-7

2nd quarter

- Kalamazoo – (14:20) Brad Selent 38-yard field goal, Kalamazoo 10–7
- Saginaw – (10:40) Nick Body 8-yard pass from Damon Dowdell (Anthony Gallagher kick blocked), Saginaw 13–10
- Kalamazoo - (5:50) Brian Dolph 45-yard pass from Randy Hutchinson (Brad Selent kick), Kalamazoo 17-13
- Saginaw – (0:56) John Radney 1-yard rush (Anthony Gallagher kick blocked), Saginaw 20–17
- Kalamazoo – (0:35) Brad Selent 51-yard field goal, 20–20

3rd quarter

- Kalamazoo - (11:00) Randy Hutchingson 23-yard pass from Eric Gardner (Brad Selent kick), Kalamazoo 27-20
- Saginaw – (1:45) Nick Body 7-yard pass from Damon Dowdell (Anthony Gallagher kick), 27–27

4th quarter

- Kalamazoo - (14:45) Eric Gardner 1-yard rush (Brad Selent kick), Saginaw 34-27
- Saginaw – (9:00) Nate Collins 9-yard pass from Damon Dowdell (Anthony Gallagher kick), 34–34
- Kalamazoo – (0:42) Brad Selent 41-yard field goal, Kalamazoo 37–34
- Saginaw – (0:26) John Radney 1-yard rush (Anthony Gallagher kick blocked), Saginaw 41–37

Passing

- Saginaw – Damon Dowdell: 18/36, 246 yards, 4 TD
- Kalamazoo – Randy Hutchinson: 13/31, 157 yards, 2 TD

Rushing

- Saginaw – John Radney: 8 att, 25 yards, 2 TD
- Kalamazoo – Randy Hutchinson: 1 att, 2 yards, 0 TD

Receiving

- Saginaw – Nick Body: 12 rec, 156 yards, 3 TD
- Kalamazoo – Brian Dolph: 6 rec, 98 yards, 1 TD

=== 2009 CIFL championship game: Fort Wayne Freedom vs. Chicago Slaughter ===
2009 CIFL championship game: Fort Wayne Freedom at Chicago Slaughter – Game summary

Quarter	1	2	3	4	Total
Freedom	7	21	7	13	48
Slaughter	0	31	13	14	58

at Sears Centre, Hoffman Estates, Illinois

- Date: June 27
- Game time: 7:15 p.m. EDT
- Game attendance: 3,861
- Referee: Wojciekiewicz

Game information

1st quarter

- Fort Wayne – (13:15) Luther Stroder 38-yard pass from Randy Hutchinson (Brad Selent kick), Fort Wayne 7–0

2nd quarter

- Chicago - (14:52) Donovan Morgan 6-yard pass from Russ Michna (Chris Nendick pass from DeJuan Alfonzo), Chicago 8-7
- Fort Wayne – (12:22) Nick Body 28-yard pass from Randy Hutchinson (Brad Selent kick), Fort Wayne 14–8
- Chicago - (9:37) Donovan Morgan 20-yard pass from Russ Michna (Chris Nendick kick), Chicago 15-14
- Fort Wayne – (5:23) Nick Body 4-yard pass from Randy Hutchinson (Brad Selent kick), Fort Wayne 21–15
- Chicago – (5:03) Reggie Gray 46-yard kickoff return (Chris Nendick kick failed), 21–21
- Fort Wayne – (0:45) Luther Stroder 6-yard rush (Brad Selent kick), Fort Wayne 28–21
- Chicago - (0:32) Dontrel Jackson 7-yard pass from Russ Michna (Chris Nendick kick), 28-28
- Chicago – (0:00) Chris Nendick 52-yard field goal, Chicago 31–28

3rd quarter

- Chicago - (12:40) Rob Boss 8-yard pass from Russ Michna (Chris Nendick kick), Chicago 38-28
- Fort Wayne – (7:54) Luther Stroder 2-yard pass from Randy Hutchinson (Brad Selent kick), Chicago 38–35
- Chicago - (5:55) Bobby Sippio 5-yard pass from Russ Michna (Chris Nendick kick failed), Chicago 44-35

4th quarter

- Fort Wayne – (14:37) Luther Stroder 14-yard pass from Randy Hutchinson (Brad Selent kick), Chicago 44–42
- Chicago - (11:37) Bobby Sippio 9-yard pass from Russ Michna (Chris Nendick kick), Chicago 51-42
- Chicago - (7:13) Donovan Morgan 28-yard pass from Russ Michna (Chris Nendick kick), Chicago 58-42
- Fort Wayne – (2:46) Justin Wynn 1-yard rush (Randy Hutchinson pass filed), Chicago 58–48

Passing

- Fort Wayne – Randy Hutchinson: 27/48, 355 yards, 5 TD
- Chicago – Russ Michna: 14/20, 182 yards, 7 TD

Rushing

- Fort Wayne – Luther Stroder: 4 att, 14 yards, 1 TD
- Chicago – Dontrel Jackson: 1 att, 13 yards, 0 TD

Receiving

- Fort Wayne – Nick Body: 13 rec, 183 yards, 2 TD
- Chicago – Donovan Morgan: 5 rec, 78 yards, 3 TD

=== 2010 CIFL championship game: Cincinnati Commandos vs. Wisconsin Wolfpack ===
2010 CIFL championship game: Wisconsin Wolfpack at Cincinnati Commandos – Game summary

Quarter	1	2	3	4	Total
Wolfpack	7	7	12	14	40
Commandos	14	6	20	14	54

at Cincinnati Gardens, Cincinnati, Ohio

- Date: June 26
- Game time: 8:00 p.m. EDT
- Game attendance: 2,758

Game information

1st quarter

- Cincinnati - (13:55) Greg Moore 5-yard rush (Travis Johnson rush failed), Cincinnati 6-0
- Wisconsin – (10:11) Marcus Lewis 2-yard pass from Matt Schabert (Tony Smidl kick), Wisconsin 7–6
- Cincinnati - (4:39) Tony Cornett 0-yard fumble recovery (Ben Mauk pass to Ray Jackson), Cincinnati 14-7

2nd quarter

- Cincinnati – (5:04) Brandon Boehm 10-yard pass from Ben Mauk (Brandon Boehm rush failed), Cincinnati 20–7
- Wisconsin – (0:00) Marcus Lewis 1-yard pass from Matt Schabert (Tony Smidl kick), Cincinnati 20–14
- Cincinnati - (1:55) Dominick Goodman 11-yard pass from Ben Mauk (Travis Johnson kick blocked), Cincinnati 13-6

3rd quarter

- Wisconsin – (12:17) Brandon Wogoman 7-yard pass from Matt Schabert (Tony Smidl kick), Wisconsin 21–20
- Cincinnati - (9:48) Robert Redd 27-yard pass from Ben Mauk (Ray Jackson rush), Cincinnati 28-21
- Wisconsin – (6:23) Tony Smidl 35-yard field goal, Cincinnati 28–24
- Cincinnati - (6:08) Ray Jackson 48-yard kickoff return (Brandon Boehm rush failed), Cincinnati 34-24
- Cincinnati - (1:19) Brandon Boehm 29-yard pass from Ben Mauk (Ben Mauk rush fumbled), Cincinnati 40-24
- Wisconsin – (1:19) Kurt Ware PAT return, Cincinnati 40–26

4th quarter

- Wisconsin – (12:53) Brandon Wogoman 12-yard pass from Matt Schabert (Tony Smidl kick), Cincinnati 40–33
- Cincinnati - (8:54) Greg Moore 12-yard pass from Ben Mauk (Travis Johnson kick), Cincinnati 47-33
- Wisconsin – (1:22) Marcus Lewis 5-yard pass from Matt Schabert (Tony Smidl kick), Cincinnati 47–40
- Cincinnati - (0:32) Greg Moore 1-yard rush (Travis Johnson kick), Cincinnati 54-40

Passing

- Wisconsin – Matt Schabert: 23/37, 214 yards, 5 TD
- Cincinnati – Ben Mauk: 18/29, 195 yards, 4 TD

Rushing

- Wisconsin – Matt Schabert: 2 att, 5 yards, 0 TD
- Cincinnati – Greg Moore: 18 att, 58 yards, 2 TD

Receiving

- Wisconsin – Brandon Wogoman: 14 rec, 151 yards, 2 TD
- Cincinnati – Robert Redd: 8 rec, 122 yards, 1 TD

=== 2011 CIFL championship game: Cincinnati Commandos vs. Marion Blue Racers ===
2011 CIFL championship game: Marion Blue Racers at Cincinnati Commandos – Game summary

Quarter	1	2	3	4	Total
Blue Racers	0	13	3	13	29
Commandos	7	14	13	10	44

at Cincinnati Gardens, Cincinnati, Ohio

- Date: June 11
- Game time: 7:30 p.m. EDT

Game information

1st quarter

- Cincinnati - (6:17) Tyler Sheehan 1-yard rush, (Brandon Yingling kick), Cincinnati 7-0

2nd quarter

- Cincinnati - (12:57) Kyenes Mincy 9-yard pass from Tyler Sheehan (Brandon Yingling kick), Cincinnati 14-0
- Cincinnati - (6:15) James Frazier 49-yard fumble recovery (Brandon Yingling kick), Cincinnati 21-0
- Marion - (2:04) Christen Haywood 30-yard rush, (Tyler Lorenz kick), Cincinnati 21-7
- Marion - (0:00) Brandon Williams 3-yard pass from Josh Harris, (Tyler Lorenz kick failed), Cincinnati 21-13

3rd quarter

- Cincinnati - (11:19) George Murrey 6-yard pass from Tyler Sheehan (Brandon Yingling kick), Cincinnati 28-13
- Marion - (5:07) Tyler Lorenz 43-yard field goal, Cincinnati 28-16
- Cincinnati - (2:47) Greg Moore 2-yard rush, (Brandon Yingling kick failed), Cincinnati 34-16

4th quarter

- Marion - (12:37) Christen Haywood 1-yard rush, (Tyler Lorenz kick), Cincinnati 34-23
- Cincinnati - (7:45) Brandon Boehm 19-yard pass from Tyler Sheehan (Brandon Yingling kick), Cincinnati 41-23
- Marion - (4:14) Brandon Williams 3-yard pass from Josh Harris, (Christen Haywood rush failed), Cincinnati 41-29
- Cincinnati - (0:48) Brandon Yingling 33-yard field goal, Cincinnati 44-29

Passing

- Marion – Josh Harris: 4/14, 15 yards, 2 TD
- Cincinnati – Tyler Sheehan: 8/19, 93 yards, 3 TD

Rushing

- Marion – Christen Haywood: 18 att, 107 yards, 2 TD
- Cincinnati – Tyler Sheehan: 2 att, 28 yards, 1 TD

Receiving

- Marion – Brandon Williams: 2 rec, 6 yards, 2 TD
- Cincinnati – Brandon Boehm: 2 rec, 36 yards, 1 TD

=== 2012 CIFL championship game: Saginaw Sting vs. Dayton Silverbacks ===
2012 CIFL championship game: Dayton Silverbacks at Saginaw Sting – Game summary

Quarter	1	2	3	4	Total
Silverbacks	6	0	1	0	7
Sting	6	15	7	7	35

at Dow Event Center, Saginaw, Michigan

- Date: June 2
- Game time: 7:30 p.m. EDT
- Game attendance: 3,850

Game information

1st quarter

- Dayton - (9:43) Tyler Waller 12-yard pass from Evan Sawyer (Jeff Hubbard kick failed), Dayton 6-0
- Saginaw – (3:33) Jeff Austin 6-yard pass from Tommy Jones (Daniel Evans kick failed), 6-6

2nd quarter

- Saginaw – (13:59) Jeff Austin 45-yard pass from Tommy Jones (Andrew Beaver pass from Tommy Jones), Saginaw 14-6
- Saginaw – (0:08) Keith Bartynski 20-yard pass from Tommy Jones (Daniel Evans kick), Saginaw 21–6

3rd quarter

- Dayton - (15:00) Jeff Hubbard rouge, Saginaw 21-7
- Saginaw – (5:15) Jeff Austin 6-yard pass from Tommy Jones (Daniel Evans kick), Saginaw 28–7

4th quarter

- Saginaw – (7:57) Jeff Austin 6-yard pass from Tommy Jones (Daniel Evans kick), 35–7

Passing

- Dayton – Evan Sawyer: 8/16, 84 yards, 1 TD
- Saginaw – Tommy Jones : 22/35, 233 yards, 5 TD

Rushing

- Dayton – Evan Sawyer: 13 att, 33 yards, 0 TD
- Saginaw – Tommy Jones : 6 att, 29 yards, 0 TD

Receiving

- Dayton – Bruce Peters: 4 rec, 45 yards, 0 TD
- Saginaw – Jeff Austin: 9 rec, 117 yards, 4 TD

=== 2013 CIFL championship game: Erie Explosion vs. Saginaw Sting ===
2013 CIFL championship game: Saginaw at Erie Explosion – Game summary

Quarter	1	2	3	4	Total
Sting	0	22	6	8	36
Explosion	7	10	13	7	37

at Erie Insurance Arena, Erie, Pennsylvania

- Date: May 12
- Game time: 2:00 p.m. EDT
- Game attendance: 1,844

Game information

1st quarter

- Erie – Aaron Smetanka 2-yard rush (Shon Rowser kick), Erie 7-0

2nd quarter

- Saginaw - A. J. McKenna 3-yard rush (Deshawn Hayes rush), Saginaw 8-7
- Saginaw – Daryl Gooden 13-yard pass from A. J. McKenna (A. J. McKenna rush failed), Saginaw 14-7
- Erie - Shon Rowser 28-yard field goal, Saginaw 14-10
- Saginaw - A. J. McKenna 1-yard rush (Deshawn Hayes rush), Saginaw 22-10
- Erie – Alfonso Hogard 10-yard pass from Aaron Smetanka (Shon Rowser kick), Saginaw 22-17

3rd quarter

- Erie – Richard Stokes 17-yard rush (Show Roswer kick failed), Erie 23-22
- Erie – Richard Stokes 6-yard rush (Show Roswer kick), Erie 30-22
- Sagniaw - Touchdown (attempt failed), Erie 30-28

4th quarter

- Saginaw – Shaun Hladki 5-yard pass from A. J. McKenna (Deshawn Hayes rush), Saginaw 36-30
- Erie – Richard Stokes 7-yard rush (Show Roswer kick), Erie 37-30

Passing

- Saginaw – A. J. McKenna: 23/41, 199 yards, 2 TD
- Erie – Aaron Smetanka: 10/15, 57 yards, 1 TD

Rushing

- Saginaw – A. J. McKenna: 6 att, 21 yards, 2 TD
- Erie – Richard Stokes: 14 att, 97 yards, 3 TD

Receiving

- Saginaw – C. J. Tarver: 6 rec, 48 yards, 0 TD
- Erie – Johnson: 3 rec, 23 yards, 0 TD

=== 2014 CIFL championship game: Erie Explosion at Marion Blue Racers ===
2014 CIFL championship game: Erie Explosion at Marion Blue Racers – Game summary

Quarter	1	2	3	4	Total
Explosion	12	7	7	12	38
Blue Racers	0	20	6	0	26

at Veterans Memorial Coliseum, Marion, Ohio

- Date: May 18
- Game time: 2:00 p.m. EDT
- John Dudley, Erie Times News

Game information

1st quarter

- Erie – Aaron Smetanka 15-yard pass to Travis Tarpley (Shon Rowser kick failed), Erie 6-0
- Erie – Aaron Smetanka 35-yard pass to Alfonso Hoggard (Shon Rowser kick failed), Erie 12-0

2nd quarter

- Erie – Richard Stokes 30-yard run (Shon Rowser kick), Erie 19-0
- Marion – Chris Wallace 5-yard pass to Brandon Williams (Thomas McKenzie rush), Erie 19-8
- Marion – Thomas McKenzie 2-yard run (Thomas McKenzie rush failed), Erie 19-14
- Marion – Thomas McKenzie 36-yard fumble return (Thomas McKenzie rush failed), Marion 20-19

3rd quarter

- Marion – Chris Wallace 16-yard pass to Mike Tatum (Chris Wallace pass failed), Marion 26-19
- Erie – Richard Stokes 9-yard run (Shon Rowser kick), 26-26

4th quarter

- Erie – Aaron Smetanka 4-yard pass to Evan Twombly (Shon Rowser kick blocked), Erie 32-26
- Erie – Richard Stokes 2-yard run (Richard Stokes rush failed), Erie 38-26

Passing

- Marion – Chris Wallace: 2 TD, 1 INT
- Erie – Aaron Smetanka: 3 TD, O INT

Rushing

- Marion – Thomas McKenzie:
- Erie – Richard Stokes:

Receiving

- Marion –
- Erie –
