= 2007 Continental Indoor Football League season =

2007 CIFL season
- League: Continental Indoor Football League
- Sport: Indoor Football

Regular season
- Season champions: Michigan Pirates
- Season MVP: Robert Height, (MICH)

League postseason
- Great Lakes champions: Michigan Pirates
- Great Lakes runners-up: Kalamazoo Xplosion
- Atlantic champions: Rochester Raiders
- Atlantic runners-up: New England Surge

CIFL Championship Game
- Champions: Rochester Raiders
- Runners-up: Michigan Pirates
- Finals MVP: Mike Condello (ROC)

CIFL seasons
- ← 2006 2008 →

The 2007 Continental Indoor Football League season was the league's second season. The league champions were the Rochester Raiders, who defeated the Michigan Pirates in the CIFL Indoor Championship Game.

== Standings ==
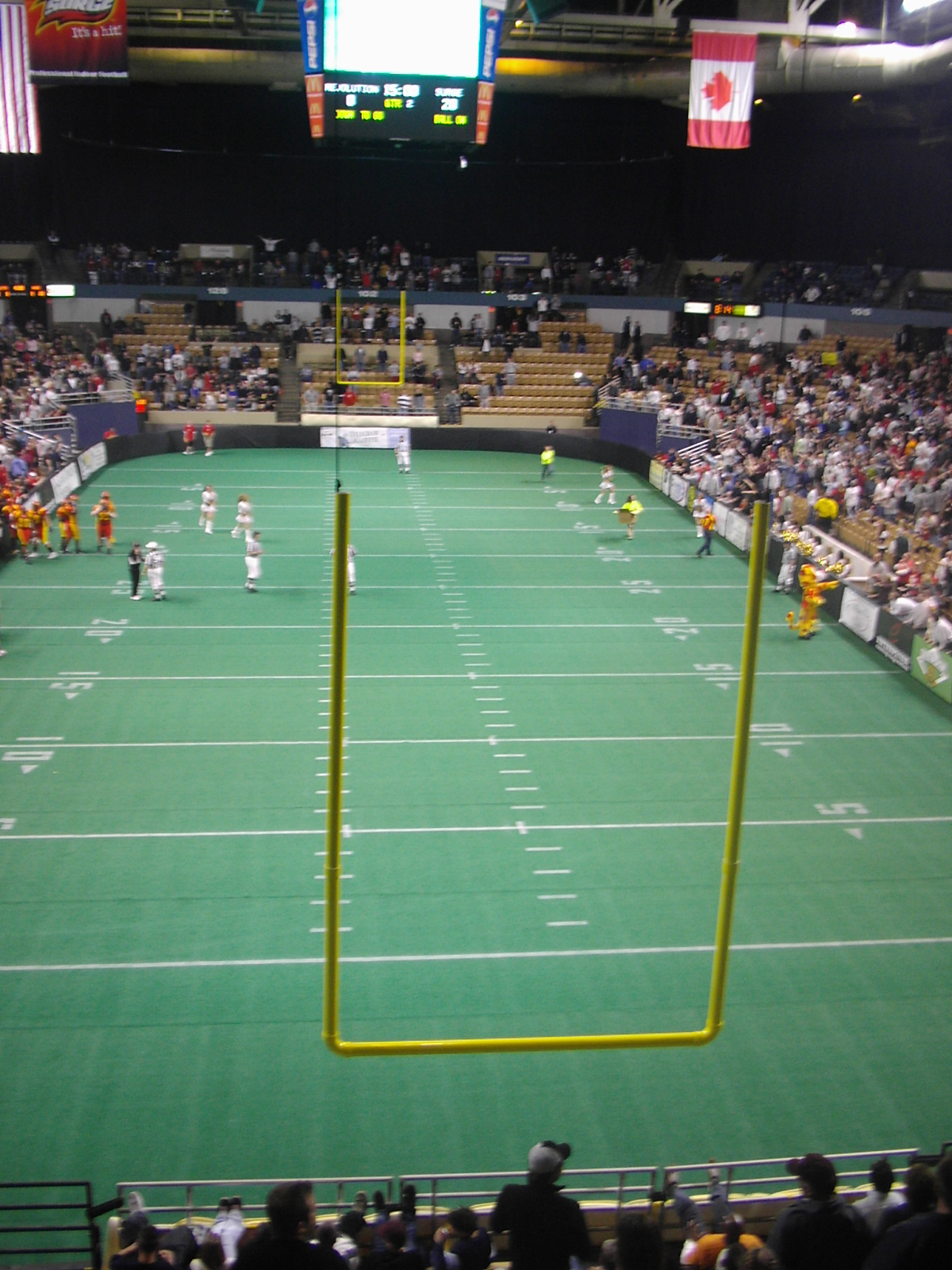
The DCU Center during the New England Surge's inaugural game.

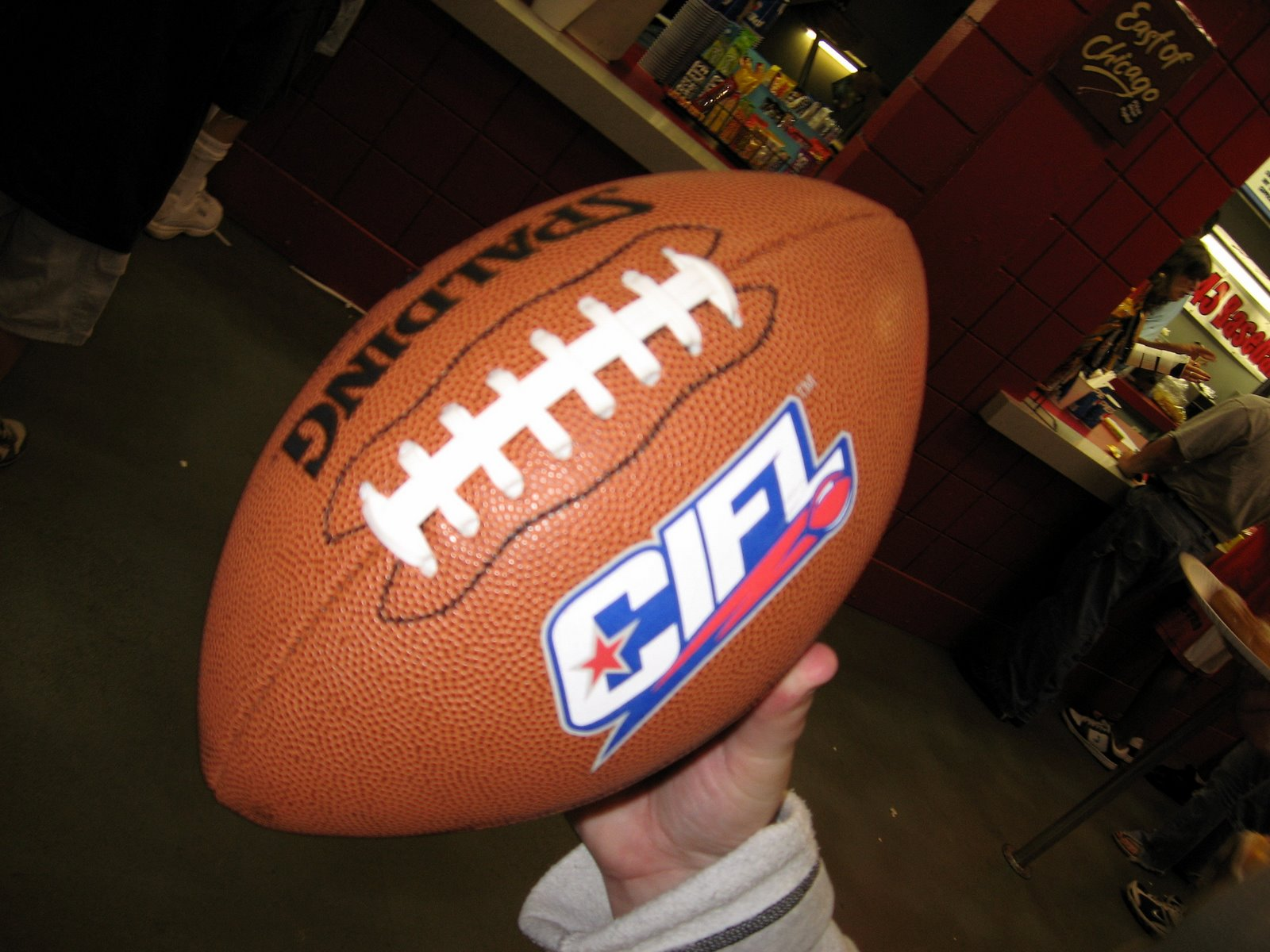
The CIFL's 2007 game ball

Team	Overall			Division		
Team	Wins	Losses	Percentage	Wins	Losses	Percentage
Great Lakes Division
Port Huron/Michigan Pirates	12	0	1.000	10	0	1.000
Kalamazoo Xplosion	10	2	0.833	10	2	0.833
Chicago Slaughter	9	3	0.750	8	2	0.800
Marion Mayhem	6	6	0.500	6	5	0.545
Muskegon Thunder	4	8	0.333	4	7	0.364
Miami Valley Silverbacks	4	8	0.333	3	7	0.300
Summit County Rumble	1	11	0.083	0	7	0.000
Springfield Stallions	0	12	0.000	0	11	0.000
Atlantic Division
Rochester Raiders	10	2	0.833	9	0	1.000
New England Surge	8	4	0.667	8	3	0.727
Lehigh Valley Outlawz	7	5	0.583	5	5	0.500
Chesapeake Tide	7	5	0.583	6	5	0.545
Steubenville Stampede	5	7	0.417	2	6	0.250
NY/NJ Revolution	1	11	0.083	0	11	0.000

- Green indicates clinched playoff berth
- Purple indicates division champion
- Grey indicates clinched best league record

== Playoffs ==
Great Lakes Division Qualifiers	Division Semifinals
3	Chicago	40
2	Kalamazoo	51
6	Miami Valley	28
3	Chicago	60
Great Lakes Division
5	Muskegon	57
4	Marion	68
4	Marion	20
1	Michigan	70
3	Lehigh Valley	34
2	New England	58
Atlantic Division
4	Chesapeake	43
1	Rochester	76

Division Championships
2	Kalamazoo	29
1	Michigan	37
2	New England	45
1	Rochester	80

CIFL Championship Game
GL1	Michigan	27
A1	Rochester	37

== 2007 award winners ==
- Most Valuable Player (Vincent Cleveland Memorial Trophy) – Robert Height, Port Huron Pirates
- Offensive Player of the Year – Robert Height, Port Huron Pirates
- Defensive Player of the Year – Eddie Bynes, Port Huron Pirates
- Special Teams Player of the Year – Brad Selent, Kalamazoo Xplosion
- CIFL Indoor Championship Game Most Valuable Player – Mike Condello, Rochester Raiders
- Coach of the Year – Karl Featherstone, Port Huron Pirates
