= St. John Arena (Steubenville) =

Arena in Ohio, United States

Coordinates: 40.369477°N 80.662254°W

St. John's Arena was a 4,200-seat multipurpose arena located in Steubenville, Ohio U.S., which was primarily used for indoor soccer, basketball, boxing, professional wrestling, wrestling, and other sports, plus conventions, trade shows, and concerts. As of 2024, the arena, now part of a local YMCA, is no longer in use.

== About ==
St. John Arena was built as the Diocesan Community Arena by the Diocese of Steubenville, and was completed in 1960. Among the musical acts that appeared at the arena in its early days were Johnny Mathis, The Supremes, Bobby Rydell, Bobby Vinton and Chubby Checker, along with several popular big bands. It is not known whether Steubenville's most famous native son, Dean Martin, ever appeared in concert at the arena.

The arena floor measures 16,290 sq ft (1,513 m^{2}), 181 by 90 ft (55 by 27 m), while the lobby measures 4,425 sq ft (411.1 m^{2}), 177 by 25 ft (53.9 by 7.6 m). There is a 2,210 sq ft (205 m^{2}), 65 by 34 ft (20 by 10 m) meeting room at the arena, and several tractor trailers can be accommodated at the rear of the arena, thanks to access through a 12 by 11 ft (3.7 by 3.4 m) garage door at the arena's loading bay.

When used for concerts, the arena can seat up to 5,400, and as a basketball arena it seats 5,200. The Steubenville O.H. St. John's Arena is now used as a YMCA Wellness Center.

The Ohio Junior High wrestling championships were held at the arena.
