= Summit County Rumble =

Logo

General information
- Founded: 2006
- Folded: 2007
- Headquartered: Summit County Fairgrounds Arena Complex in Tallmadge, Ohio
- Colors: Maroon, Black, Silver

Personnel
- General manager: Ramone Davenport
- Head coach: Moe Cooper

Team history
- Summit County Rumble (2007)

Home fields
- Summit County Fairgrounds Arena Complex (2007)

League / conference affiliations
- Continental Indoor Football League (2007): Great Lakes Division (2007)

The Summit County Rumble were a Continental Indoor Football League team located in Tallmadge, Ohio (near Akron) and that began play in 2007. The team played their home games at the Summit County Fairgrounds Arena Complex. The team was originally scheduled to play as the Toledo Rumble in the Toledo Sports Arena, but the city of Toledo, which is seeking a new arena, balked on the deal. Later on, they were going to play as the Wayne County Rumble at the Alice Noble Ice Arena in Wooster, Ohio, but a deal fell through. Finally, they were going to play at the Gault Recreation and Fitness Center, also in Wooster, but a deal fell through there as well. With that they decided to move to Summit County and became the Summit County Rumble.

The team held the dubious distinction of being the first team to lose to the New York/New Jersey Revolution (a 48-47 loss on May 5, 2007 at the Rumble's home opener). Later in the season, on June 16, the Rumble defeated the Revolution in Morristown by a score of 38-27, thus earning the Rumble their first (and only) win in franchise history.

On June 28, 2007 the CIFL announced that it had suspended operations of the team.

== Season-by-season ==
Season records
Season	W	L	T	Finish	Playoff results
2007	1	11	0	7th Great Lakes	--

== 2007 season schedule ==
Date	Opponent	Home/Away	Result
March 24	Muskegon Thunder	Neutral (Steubenville)	Lost 21-42
April 5	Steubenville Stampede	Away	Lost 6-42
April 13	Muskegon Thunder	Away	Lost 12-54
April 20	Steubenville Stampede	Away	Lost 32-89
April 28	Port Huron Pirates	Away	Lost 34-70
May 5	New York/New Jersey Revolution	Home	Lost 47-48
May 19	Port Huron Pirates	Home	Lost 0-63
May 26	Kalamazoo Xplosion	Away	Lost 20-75
June 2	Chesapeake Tide	Home	Lost 53-58
June 9	Marion Mayhem	Away	Lost 45-48
June 16	New York/New Jersey Revolution	Away	Won 38-27
June 24	Marion Mayhem	Home	Lost 63-77

=== 2007 CIFL standings ===
2007 Continental Indoor Football League
Team	Overall				Division			
Team	W	L	T	PCT	W	L	T	PCT
Great Lakes Conference
Michigan Pirates-y	12	0	0	1.000	10	0	0	1.000
Kalamazoo Xplosion-x	10	2	0	.833	10	2	0	.833
Chicago Slaughter-x	9	3	0	.750	8	2	0	.800
Marion Mayhem-x	6	6	0	.500	6	5	0	.545
Muskegon Thunder-x	4	8	0	.333	4	7	0	.364
Miami Valley Silverbacks	4	8	0	.333	3	7	0	.300
Summit County Rumble	1	11	0	.083	0	7	0	.000
Springfield Stallions	0	12	0	.000	0	11	0	.000
Atlantic Conference
Rochester Raiders-y	10	2	0	.833	90	0	0	1.000
New England Surge-x	8	4	0	.667	8	3	0	.727
Lehigh Valley Outlawz-x	7	5	0	.583	5	5	0	.500
Chesapeake Tide-x	7	5	0	.583	6	5	0	.545
Steubenville Stampede	5	7	0	.417	2	6	0	.250
NY/NJ Revolution	1	11	0	.083	0	11	0	.000
