= Springfield Stallions =

Logo

General information
- Founded: 2006
- Folded: 2007
- Headquartered: Springfield, Illinois at the Prairie Capital Convention Center
- Colors: Red, Black, Silver

Personnel
- Owners: Justin Gettys, Kris Underwood (Coyote Kris Underwood) Accie Connor (D’Lo Brown)
- Head coach: Kevin Gade (2007)

Team history
- Springfield Stallions (2007)

Home fields
- Prairie Capital Convention Center (2007)

League / conference affiliations
- Continental Indoor Football League (2007): Great Lakes Conference (2007)

The Springfield Stallions were an indoor football team that played their home games in Springfield, Illinois. They were a 2007 expansion member of the Continental Indoor Football League. The Stallions played their home football games at the Prairie Capital Convention Center which is located in downtown Springfield. It has a seating capacity of 6,500 for football games.

This was the inaugural season for the Stallions at the professional level. There had previously been a semi-pro team in Springfield called the Stallions in 2006 which played for the 8FL. While the current Stallions ownership maintained the rights to the original franchise (and maintained a few players from the semi-pro team) the current Stallions' history was not considered a continuation of the original team's. The team was originally coached by Kevin Gade. They did sign former professional NFL or other professional indoor league players like Winston Taylor, Kevin Galbreath and Freddie Weinke

The Stallions one season in the CIFL ended with a few weeks remaining in the season. The owners of the team, disappeared three weeks into the season leaving management and the coaching staff to try to scrape together a team for the remainder of the season, leaving numerous outstanding debts to sponsors, the Prairie Capitol Convention Center, and all players and coaches. Many players and coaches never received a paycheck.

Following a teleconference involving remaining management and the league office, the team ended operations before the conclusion of the 2007 season. The semi-pro 8-man football team, the Capital City Outlaws, replaced the Stallions for one game against the Chicago Slaughter, only to be blown out 61-6.

== Season-by-season ==
Season records
Season	W	L	T	Finish	Playoff results
2007	0	12	0	8th Great Lakes	--

== 2007 season schedule ==
Date	Opponent	Home/Away	Result
April 7	Kalamazoo Xplosion	Home	Lost 19-47
April 14	Port Huron Pirates	Home	Lost 6-54
April 21	Miami Valley Silverbacks	Away	Lost 29-67
April 28	Kalamazoo Xplosion	Away	Lost 14-38
May 5	Marion Mayhem	Home	Lost 26-51
May 12	Steubenville Stampede	Away	Lost** 8-66
May 19	Muskegon Thunder	Home	Lost 25-49
May 25	Muskegon Thunder	Away	Lost 36-52
June 3	Chicago Slaughter	Home	Lost 44-69
June 9	Miami Valley Silverbacks	Home	Lost 22-56
June 16	Marion Mayhem (Stallions forfeit)	Away	Lost 0-2
June 24	Chicago Slaughter (Stallions forfeit)	Away	Lost 0-2

  - - "Stallions" team was actually fielded by the league and was not the actual Stallions team from Springfield.

=== 2007 CIFL standings ===
2007 Continental Indoor Football League
Team	Overall				Division			
Team	W	L	T	PCT	W	L	T	PCT
Great Lakes Conference
Michigan Pirates-y	12	0	0	1.000	10	0	0	1.000
Kalamazoo Xplosion-x	10	2	0	.833	10	2	0	.833
Chicago Slaughter-x	9	3	0	.750	8	2	0	.800
Marion Mayhem-x	6	6	0	.500	6	5	0	.545
Muskegon Thunder-x	4	8	0	.333	4	7	0	.364
Miami Valley Silverbacks	4	8	0	.333	3	7	0	.300
Summit County Rumble	1	11	0	.083	0	7	0	.000
Springfield Stallions	0	12	0	.000	0	11	0	.000
Atlantic Conference
Rochester Raiders-y	10	2	0	.833	90	0	0	1.000
New England Surge-x	8	4	0	.667	8	3	0	.727
Lehigh Valley Outlawz-x	7	5	0	.583	5	5	0	.500
Chesapeake Tide-x	7	5	0	.583	6	5	0	.545
Steubenville Stampede	5	7	0	.417	2	6	0	.250
NY/NJ Revolution	1	11	0	.083	0	11	0	.000
