= 2006 Great Lakes Indoor Football League season =

2006 GLIFL season
- League: Great Lakes Indoor Football League
- Sport: Indoor Football

Regular season
- Season champions: Port Huron Pirates
- Season MVP: Matt Cottengim, (ROC)

League postseason
- 1 vs. 4 champions: Michigan Pirates
- 1 vs. 4 runners-up: Battle Creek Crunch
- 2 vs. 3 champions: Rochester Raiders
- 2 vs. 3 runners-up: Lehigh Valley Outlawz

Great Lakes Bowl I
- Champions: Port Huron Pirates
- Runners-up: Rochester Raiders
- Finals MVP: Rayshawn Askew (PH)

CIFL seasons
- N/A 2007 →

The 2006 Great Lakes Indoor Football League season was the first season of the Great Lakes Indoor Football League (GLIFL).

The league was founded in 2005 by brothers Eric and Jeff Spitaleri and their friend Cory Trapp. The league's first franchise accepted was the Lehigh Valley Outlawz, who joined in late June, 2005. It cost a new owner a $15,000 franchising fee, with a capped salary of $5,400 per team, per week, with no player earning more than $300 per game. While trying to attract teams, the league agreed to arena contracts before securing owners in efforts to attract owners in those specific market areas. They reached agreements with markets in Danville, Illinois, Battle Creek, Michigan, Rochester, New York, Port Huron, Michigan, Toledo, Ohio and Marion, Ohio. Of those markets, the league was able to sell ownership to four of them. In December, it was finalized that the league would begin with 6 teams in their inaugural season, with teach team playing a 10-game season over a 12-week span. On April 7, 2006, the league held its first-ever games with the Battle Creek Crunch hosting the Port Huron Pirates and the Rochester Raiders hosting the New York/New Jersey Revolution. The Crunch were defeated 62-22 by the Pirates, and the Raiders defeating the Revolution 71-13. The league's first ever playoff format was a 4-team set up with the #1 seed hosting the #4 seed, and the #2 seed hosting the #3 seed. The semifinals featured a pair of blowout games, with Port Huron and Rochester advancing to Great Lakes Bowl I, which was to be played at McMorran Arena as Port Huron was the #1 seed on July 22. The Pirates were able shut down the Raiders' offense for most of the second half earning a 40-34 victory for the Port Huron, thus completing the first ever undefeated season in league history. At the conclusion of the first season, the league also put together an All-Star Game at Stabler Arena, where they split up 3 teams each for an East vs. West matchup. The West, dominated with a roster full of Port Huron's championship team.

== Standings ==
Team	Wins	Losses	Percentage
Port Huron Pirates	10	0	1.000
Rochester Raiders	7	3	0.700
Lehigh Valley Outlawz	5	5	0.500
Battle Creek Crunch	4	6	0.400
Marion Mayhem	4	6	0.400
New York/New Jersey Revolution	0	10	0.000

- Green indicates clinched playoff berth
- Grey indicates best regular season record

== Playoffs ==
Semifinals
3	Lehigh Valley	27
2	Rochester	58
4	Battle Creek	3
1	Port Huron	74

CIFL Championship Game
2	Rochester	34
1	Port Huron	40

== All-Star game ==
All-Star Game
W	Western All-Stars	49
E	Eastern All-Stars	17

- Located at the Stabler Arena in Bethlehem, Pennsylvania on August 5, 2006.

== 2006 award winners ==
- Most Valuable Player (Vincent Cleveland Memorial Trophy) - Matt Cottengim, Rochester Raiders
- Offensive Player of the Year - Matt Cottengim, Rochester Raiders
- Quarterback of the Year - Matt Cottengim, Rochester Raiders
- Running Back of the Year - Rayshaun Askew, Port Huron Pirates
- Wide Receiver of the Year - Maurice Jackson, Rochester Raiders
- Defensive Player of the Year - Eddie Bynes, Port Huron Pirates
- Linebacker of the Year - Ed Chan, NY/NJ Revolution
- Defensive Back of the Year - Eric Gardner, Battle Creek Crunch
- Return Man of the Year - Darius Smith, Rochester Raiders
- GLIFL All-Star Game MVP - Shane Franzer, Port Huron Pirates
- Coach of the Year - Brian Hug, Port Huron Pirates
