= Continental Indoor Football League =

US indoor football league

- Most recent season or competition: 2014 Continental Indoor Football League season
- Continental Indoor Football League logo
- Formerly: Ohio-Penn Indoor Football League; Great Lakes Indoor Football League
- Sport: Indoor football
- Founded: 2005
- Founder: Eric Spitaleri; Jeff Spitaleri; Cory Trapp
- First season: 2006
- Owners: Stuart Schweigert; Jim O'Brien; Rob Licht
- Country: United States
- Most recent champion: Erie Explosion (2nd title)
- Most titles: Cincinnati Commandos; Erie Explosion; Saginaw Sting (2 titles)
- Sponsors: Adidas; All Night Affair; Báden; Divine Web Dezine; Hillier Studio; Impact Scouting; Impact Training; Insane Sportswear
- Related competitions: Supreme Indoor Football; Indoor Football Alliance; Indoor Football League; Professional Indoor Football League

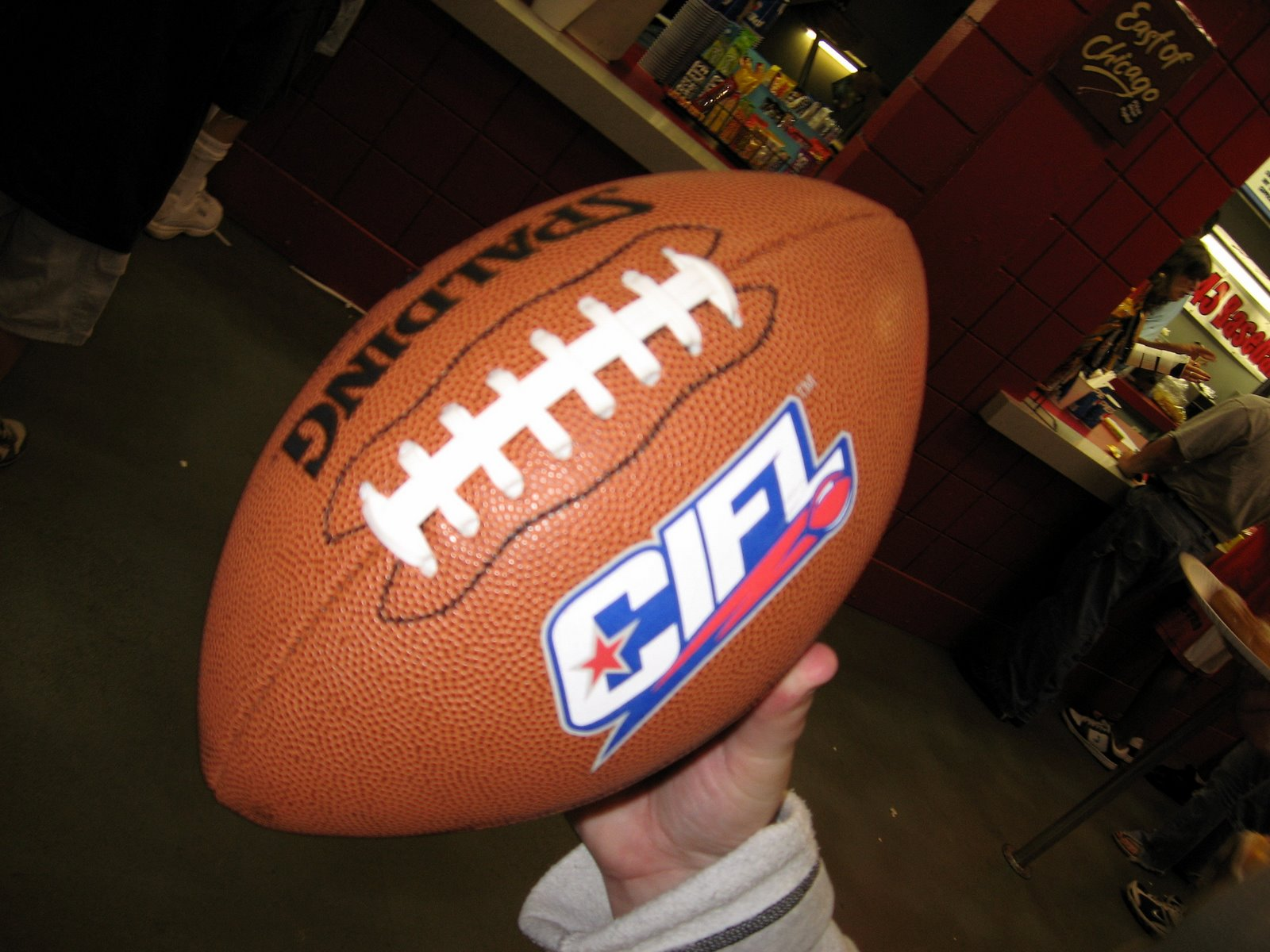
The CIFL's 2007 game ball

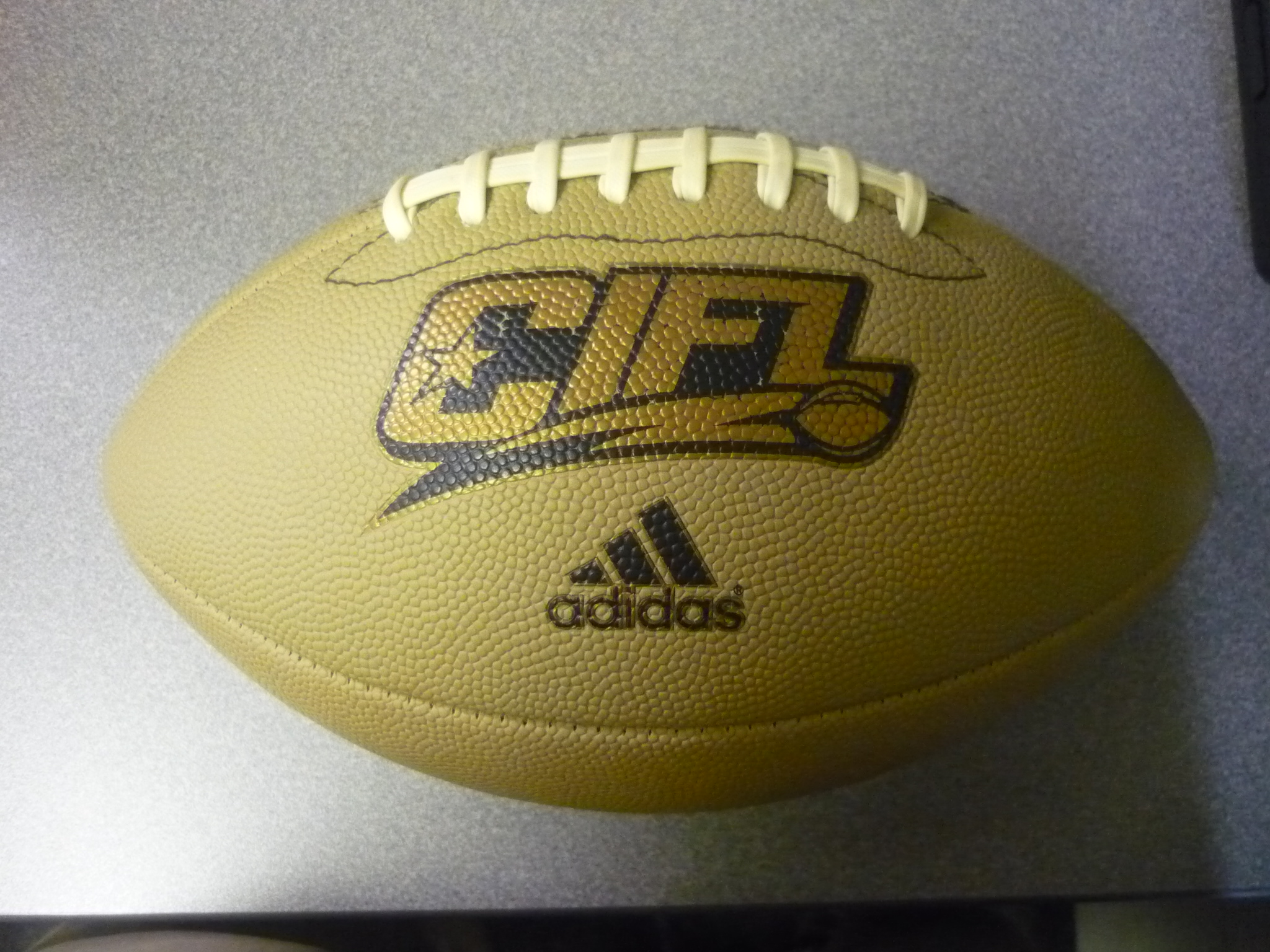
The CIFL's 2010 game ball

The Continental Indoor Football League (CIFL) was an indoor football league based along the Midwestern United States region that played nine seasons from 2006 to 2014. It began play in April 2006 as the Great Lakes Indoor Football League (GLIFL). It was formed by Jeff Spitaleri, his brother Eric, and a third member, Cory Trapp, all from the Canton, Ohio, area.

The league was originally called the Ohio-Penn Indoor Football League, but then executives decided to increase the league's appeal to the entire Great Lakes region. Initially, the league was relatively successful, having a cumulative attendance over 75,000 in the inaugural regular season. However, the league, like other indoor football associations, was plagued by folding franchises and unenforceable policies throughout its existence. For example, the 2006 champion Port Huron Pirates were found to have been paying some of their players over the league salary cap. In 2007, several teams folded during the season, and during the 2008 season, the league's most successful team, the Rochester Raiders, moved to another league due to frustration over the failure of the league to provide notice of an opponent's forfeiture, resulting in lost ticket and advertising revenue. The league also failed to return the Raiders' owners' emergency fund deposit, which was collected specifically to protect against such occurrences.

The CIFL is among several indoor football leagues that maintained a mostly regional operation, with most of its teams clustered in the Midwestern United States. Teams went back and forth between the CIFL and the other regional leagues, as well as the Indoor Football League (a national league of similar caliber), over the course of the league's history. Prior to its disbanding, the CIFL claimed itself to be the longest continually operating current indoor football league in the United States, noting that older leagues such as the Arena Football League and American Indoor Football had suspended operations at least once since the CIFL's founding.

In July 2012, the CIFL changed ownership for the first time in its history, when Jeff Spitaleri sold the CIFL to Indoor Football Incorporated, which included Rob Licht, Jim O'Brien, and Stuart Schweigert. The group also owned the Saginaw Sting. The new ownership of the league sought to help current teams brand their product better, as well as look to expand the league, but its primary goal was to have competitive franchises.

== History ==
The Great Lakes Indoor Football League was founded in 2005 by brothers Eric and Jeff Spitaleri and their friend Cory Trapp. The league's first franchise accepted was the Lehigh Valley Outlawz, who joined in late June, 2005. During the league's first season, it cost a new owner a $15,000 franchising fee, with a capped salary of $5,400 per team, per week, with no player earning more than $300 per game. While trying to attract teams, the league agreed to arena contracts before securing owners in efforts to attract owners in those specific market areas. They reached agreements with markets in Danville, Illinois, Battle Creek, Michigan, Rochester, New York, Port Huron, Michigan, Toledo, Ohio and Marion, Ohio. Of those markets, the league was able to sell ownership to four of them. In December, it was finalized that the league would begin with six teams in their inaugural season, with each team playing a 10-game season over a 12-week span. On April 7, 2006, the league held its first games with the Battle Creek Crunch hosting the Port Huron Pirates and the Rochester Raiders hosting the New York/New Jersey Revolution. The Crunch were defeated 62–22 by the Pirates, and the Raiders defeated the Revolution 71–13. The league's first playoff format was a four-team setup with the number-one seed hosting the number-four seed, and the number-two seed hosting the number-three seed. The semifinals featured a pair of blowout games, with Port Huron and Rochester advancing to Great Lakes Bowl I, which was to be played at McMorran Arena as Port Huron was the number-one seed on July 22. The Pirates were able shut down the Raiders' offense for most of the second half, earning a 40–34 victory for Port Huron, thus completing the first undefeated season in league history. At the conclusion of the first season, the league also put together an All-Star Game at Stabler Arena, where they split up three teams each for an East vs. West matchup. The West dominated, with a roster full of Port Huron's championship team.

The 2007 season brought big changes, as the league changed its name to the Continental Indoor Football League, and the league expanded to 14 teams with only the Crunch not returning.

The league suspended operations in October 2014, when the league's five remaining teams, the champion Erie Explosion, the Saginaw Sting, Marion Blue Racers, Chicago Blitz, and Northern Kentucky River Monsters, either suspended operations or joined other leagues. Shortly thereafter, the league website redirected to American Indoor Football. On August 23, 2015, it was announced that the CIFL would return for the 2016 season (playing an interlocking schedule with another proposed league, Supreme Indoor Football, as part of the Indoor Football Alliance) and the Explosion, Sting, and Blue Racers will return to the CIFL as a result. However, the league effectively disbanded again later that fall after no other teams agreed to join the revived league; the Blue Racers and Sting joined American Indoor Football, and the Explosion eventually announced they would not play in 2016.

== Official rules and notable rule distinctions ==
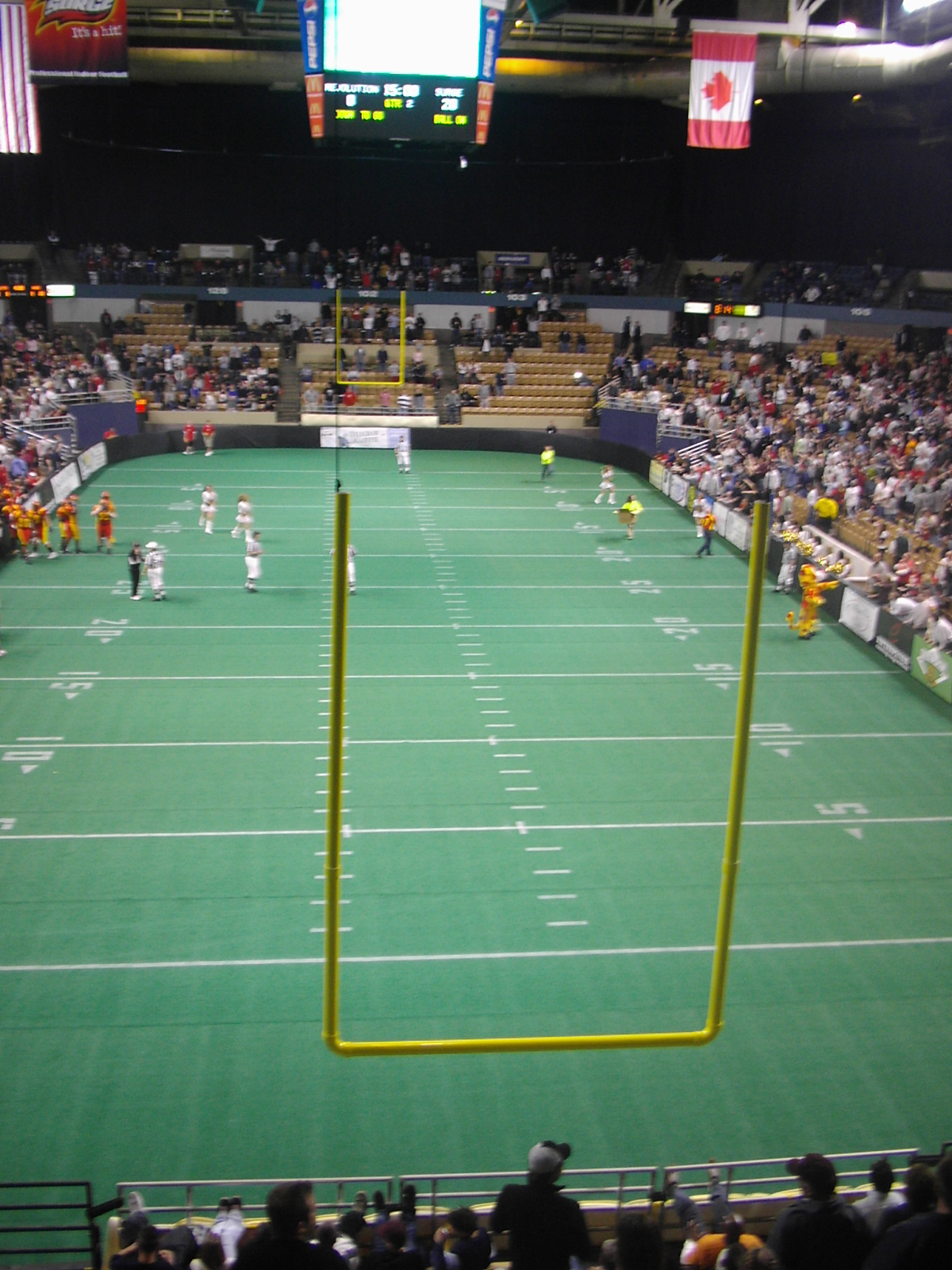
The DCU Center during a 2007 New England Surge game.

Field size – fields were 50 yards long by 25 yards wide, with end zones a minimum of 5 yards in depth. Fields may vary in size due to physical constraints within facility, with CIFL permission. End zones may be rounded due to hockey board configurations. Padded dasher board walls around the entire field acted as an extension of the ground (only "out of bounds" if contact made by opposing player that forces player into the dasher wall, much like a 'down by contact' rule).

Goal posts – Goal posts are 12 feet (3.7 m) from the floor to the crossbar. The crossbar is 10 feet (3.0 m) in width. Anything used to hang the goalpost is considered a part of the upright.

Number of players – Eight players per team were on the field at one time. Starting in 2013, teams were allowed to expand their active rosters from 19 players to 21, and are required to carry a backup quarterback and kicker. In the league's earliest seasons, the GLIFL/CIFL played with only seven players on each side, one less than the standard eight used in other indoor football leagues.

Playing time – Four 15-minute quarters were used, with a running clock. Clocks stopped only for incomplete passes and out-of-bounds plays during the final minute of the second and fourth quarters. A 25-second play clock also was used.

Scoring – Six points were awarded for a TD, 2 points for run or pass conversion, or drop-kick PAT, 1 point for place-kick PAT, 2 points for defensive conversion following TD, 2 points for a safety, 3 points for a field goal, and 4 points for a drop-kick field goal. Teams score a single point on their kickoff if the ball makes its way through the uprights.

Backfield in motion – One player may be in motion in any direction behind the line of scrimmage prior to the snap.

Offensive linemen – Three linemen must be in a three- or four-point stance prior to the snap. They must line up guard, center, guard and next to one another. Any offensive lineman not covered up by the fourth man on the line of scrimmage is an eligible receiver if he is wearing an eligible receiver number (1–49, 80–89).

Defensive linemen – The three defensive linemen must line up on the nose, or can line up inside foot-to-outside foot outside of an offensive lineman. Linemen must rush inside if nose up or slanted into if shaded, and they must make contact before any movement to the outside is made.

Blitzing – Only one non-lineman can blitz at a time. This player can blitz from any direction, but must be at least five yards off the line of scrimmage/goal line prior to the snap. Players do not have to announce their eligibility to blitz. Defensive backs are not allowed to blitz.

Linebackers – At least two defensive players must line up at least 5 yards behind the line of scrimmage. The other two nonlinemen must either line up face-to-face with an offensive non-lineman on the line, or be 5 yards behind the line of scrimmage. After the snap, this rule is eliminated and the players can roam anywhere they wish, provided it does not violate blitzing rules. Linebackers can line up at the goal line if the offense is within five yards of scoring.

Kickoffs – If a kickoff leaves the field of play on the fly, the ball comes out to the 25-yard line. The sideline walls and end zone walls are not out of bounds, and balls can be played off of them. If a kickoff leaves the field of play after making contact with the field or a player on either team, the ball comes out to the 5-yard line, or the point in which it leaves the field of play, whichever is closest to the kicking team's goal line.

Offense – No punting is allowed. The offense must attempt to gain a first down or touchdown, or may attempt a field goal (by placement or drop kick).

Coaches – Starting in 2013, coaches were permitted to coach on the field again, which improved communication between their players and them.

Overtime – Overtime is played with NCAA-style rules (each team gets one possession), but each possession is started with a kickoff rather than at the 25-yard line. Teams must go for a two-point conversion (by scrimmage play) starting with the third overtime session.

Co-ed play – Two female placekickers, Katie Hnida and Julie Harshbarger, have played for the CIFL. Excluding all-female leagues, the CIFL is one of only three professional football leagues (the Atlantic Coast Football League in 1970, the Indoor Football League in 2014) to have hired female players; the CIFL is the only league to have hired more than one, and the only one to have allowed its female players to score points.

== Season structure ==
Since 2013, the CIFL season featured a 10-game, 12-week regular season running from February to April and a 6-team single-elimination playoff beginning in April, culminating in the CIFL Championship Game in May.

Traditionally, American high school football games are played on Friday nights, American college football games are played on Thursday nights and Saturdays, and most NFL games are played on Sunday. Because the CIFL season is played at a different season from the high school, college, and NFL seasons, the CIFL scheduled Friday, Saturday, Sunday, and (new for 2013) Monday games.

=== Exhibition season ===
During minicamps in the winter, CIFL teams typically played one or two exhibition games from early January through early February. Each team was free to schedule these games, but all games were approved by the league. No games were allowed within one week of the team's first regular-season game. The games were useful for new players who were not used to playing indoor football.

=== Regular season ===
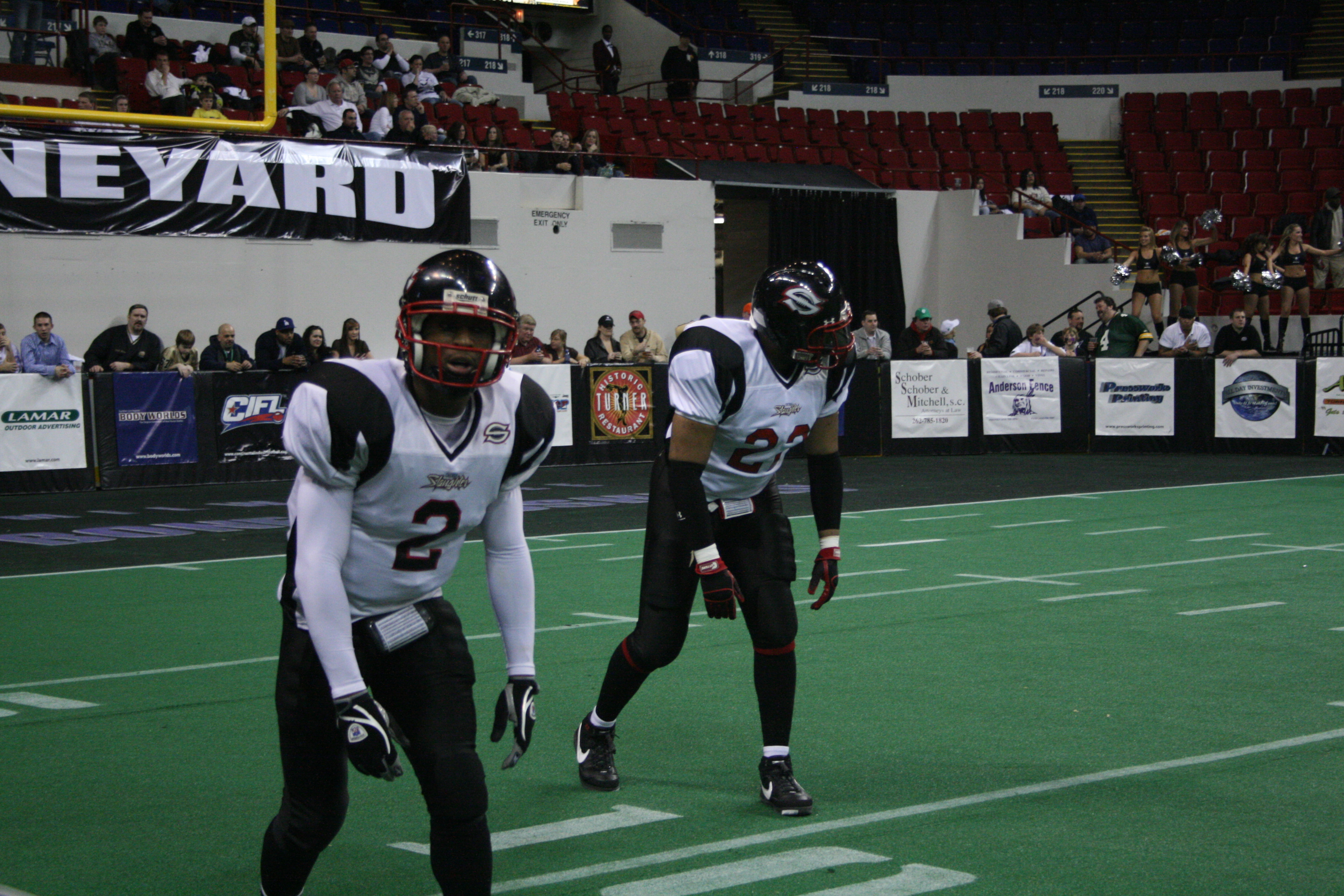
Dontrell Jackson and J.R. Taylor of the Chicago Slaughter lining up for the snap against the Milwaukee Bonecrushers

Following the preseason, each of the 10 teams embarked on a 12-week, 10-game schedule, with the extra weeks consisting of a bye to allow teams a rest sometime in the middle of the season.

The league had been using a scheduling formula to determine which teams play which during a given season. Under the formula since 2010, each of the six teams' respective 10-game schedule consisted of:

- Each team played 6 to 8 of the teams in the league, with the leftover number of games scheduled against teams already played.
- Each team played 5 home games and 5 road games.

This format was tweaked due to a travel team being in the league since 2009. The current rule reads: The CIFL regular season consists of a schedule of 10 games for each team. This allows for travel teams to play all their games on the road, and gives every team in the league an extra home game for each travel team in the league.

Although this scheduling formula determined each of the 10 teams' respective opponents, the league usually did not release the final regular schedule with specific dates and times until the winter; the CIFL needed several months to coordinate the entire season schedule so that, among other reasons, games are worked around various scheduling conflicts.

=== Playoffs ===
The CIFL has gone through many teams, so the playoff format was changed several times throughout the years. In the league's first season, 2006, the playoff format featured a 1-4 seed based on their W-L-T records. The one seed hosted the four seed, and the two seed hosted the three seed. The winners advanced to the Great Lakes Bowl I, and the highest remaining seed hosted. Due to expansion in 2007, the playoff format was expanded to eight teams making the playoffs. The top team in each division would clinch homefield advantage throughout the playoffs. The rest were wild card teams that are seeded second through fourth. From that point, the matchups would remain the same as the previous year, with the exception that the winners of each divisional playoff would meet in the CIFL Championship Game. In 2009, the league returned to its original format of a four-team playoff. This stayed in place until 2012, when the league decided to just have the regular-season first and second seeds meet for the championship.

==== CIFL Championship Game history ====
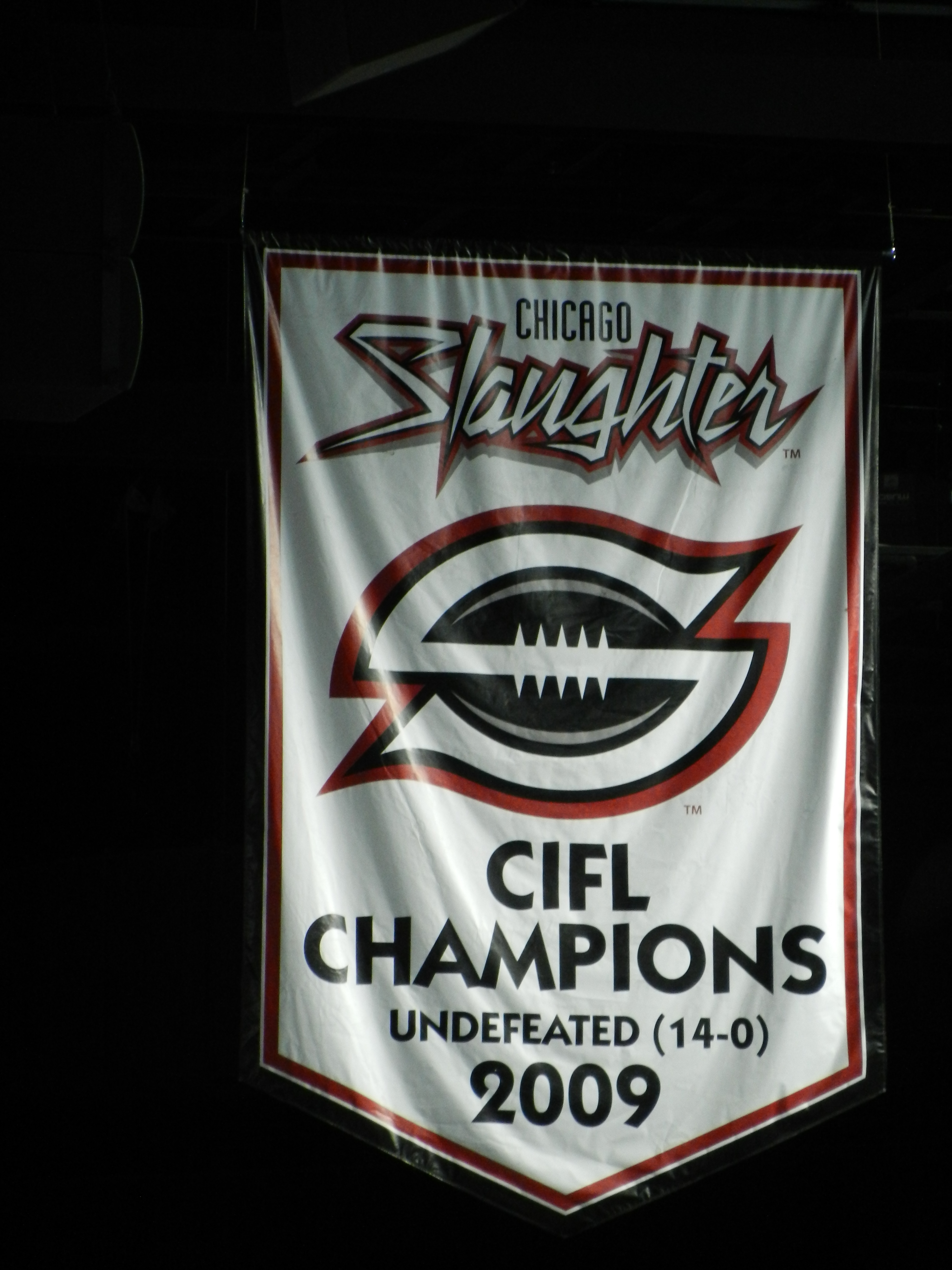
The 2009 Chicago Slaughter CIFL Championship banner

Year	Champion	Opponent	Score
2006	Port Huron Pirates	Rochester Raiders	40–34
2007	Rochester Raiders	Port Huron Pirates	37–27
2008	Saginaw Sting	Kalamazoo Xplosion	41–37
2009	Chicago Slaughter	Fort Wayne Freedom	58–48
2010	Cincinnati Commandos	Wisconsin Wolfpack	54–40
2011	Cincinnati Commandos	Marion Blue Racers	44–29
2012	Saginaw Sting	Dayton Silverbacks	35–7
2013	Erie Explosion	Saginaw Sting	37–36
2014	Erie Explosion	Marion Blue Racers	38–26

=== All-Star game ===
The league put on an All-Star game once, in its inaugural 2006 season.

== Teams ==
In its early years, the CIFL was a very unstable and somewhat informal organization. Many teams entered and left the league annually, with the worst instance of teams exiting occurring when the new Indoor Football League was formed and the league lost five teams. The league fielded at least six teams in each year of its existence, gaining and losing teams each year from both expansion and teams shifting leagues.

The Saginaw Sting was the franchise with the most time in the league; they completed their fourth season at the end of 2014. The Erie Explosion was the league's oldest team; it has been in operation since 2007 and joined the league in 2013. A potential for a merger with the American Professional Football League was expected in 2013, but this never came to fruition; likewise, a proposal to form an Indoor Football Alliance between three former CIFL teams and an upstart "Supreme Indoor Football" league for 2016 also collapsed.

=== Expansions and contractions ===
Year	# of teams	Expansion teams	Folded teams	Suspended teams	Moved teams	Relocated teams	Name changes
2006	6	Battle Creek Crunch; Lehigh Valley Outlawz; Marion Mayhem; New York/New Jersey Revolution; Port Huron Pirates; Rochester Raiders					
2007	14	Chesapeake Tide; Chicago Slaughter; Kalamazoo Xplosion; Miami Valley Silverbacks^{1} Muskegon Thunder; New England Surge; Springfield Stallions^{3} Steubenville Stampede^{3} Summit County Rumble^{3}	Battle Creek Crunch	Motor City Reapers			Port Huron Pirates → Michigan Pirates
2008	15	Flint Phantoms; Fort Wayne Freedom; Milwaukee Bonecrushers; Rock River Raptors; Saginaw Sting	Springfield Stallions; Steubenville Stampede; Summit County Rumble; Michigan Pirates Motor City Reapers				
2009	8	Wheeling Wildcats; Wisconsin Wolfpack	Flint Phantoms; Lehigh Valley Outlawz; New England Surge	Kalamazoo Xplosion; West Virginia Wild	Chesapeake Tide^{2} Muskegon Thunder^{2} New Jersey Revolution^{4} Rochester Raiders^{2} Saginaw Sting^{2}		
2010	6	Cincinnati Commandos; Fort Wayne FireHawks	Fort Wayne Freedom; Rock River Raptors; Wheeling Wildcats		Chicago Slaughter^{2}	Milwaukee Bonecrushers → Chicago Cardinals	
2011	6	Indianapolis Enforcers; Marion Blue Racers; Port Huron Predators	Marion Mayhem	Fort Wayne FireHawks; Wisconsin Wolfpack			Chicago Cardinals → Chicago Knights; Miami Valley Silverbacks → Dayton Silverbacks
2012	6	Chicago Vipers; Evansville Rage; Port Huron Patriots; Saginaw Sting^{6}	Chicago Knights; Port Huron Predators		Cincinnati Commandos^{5} Marion Blue Racers^{5}		
2013	10	Dayton Sharks; Detroit Thunder; Erie Explosion^{6} Kane County Dawgs; Kentucky Drillers^{6} Kentucky Xtreme; Marion Blue Racers^{6}	Chicago Pythons; Indianapolis Enforcers	Cincinnati Commandos^{6}		Evansville Rage → Owensboro Rage	
2014	10	Bluegrass Warhorses; Chicago Slaughter; Northern Kentucky River Monsters	Kane County Dawgs; Kentucky Drillers; Owensboro Rage				
2015 suspension	0		Bluegrass Warhorses; Detroit Thunder; Kentucky Xtreme; Port Huron Patriots; Dayton Sharks; Northern Kentucky River Monsters		Erie Explosion^{8} Marion Blue Racers^{7} Chicago Blitz^{4} Saginaw Sting^{4}		

Chart notes

1. Moved from the American Indoor Football (Association)
2. Moved to the Indoor Football League - Note the Raiders had originally gone to the AIFA.
3. The league took over operations and ceased for failure to meet league requirements.
4. Moved to the American Indoor Football (Association)
5. Moved to the Ultimate Indoor Football League
6. Moved from the Ultimate Indoor Football League
7. Moved to the X-League
8. Moved to the Professional Indoor Football League
9. Moved from the Professional Indoor Football League
10. Moved from the X-League

== Media ==
The league does not have its television rights sold to a network, such as the Arena Football League with the CBS Sports Network. Individual teams are free to work out deals with their local affiliates to broadcast their games.

Each CIFL team usually works out its own radio network deal with local stations, and the stations employ its announcers. Nationally, the CIFL is heard on the CIFL Radio Network, which can be used online via the CIFL GameCenter on the league's website.

In 2010, the CIFL introduced the CIFL GameCenter which allows statisticians wired to into the CIFL Network. As they use the stat software to record the game, it is updated live in the GameCenter.

== Player contracts and compensation ==
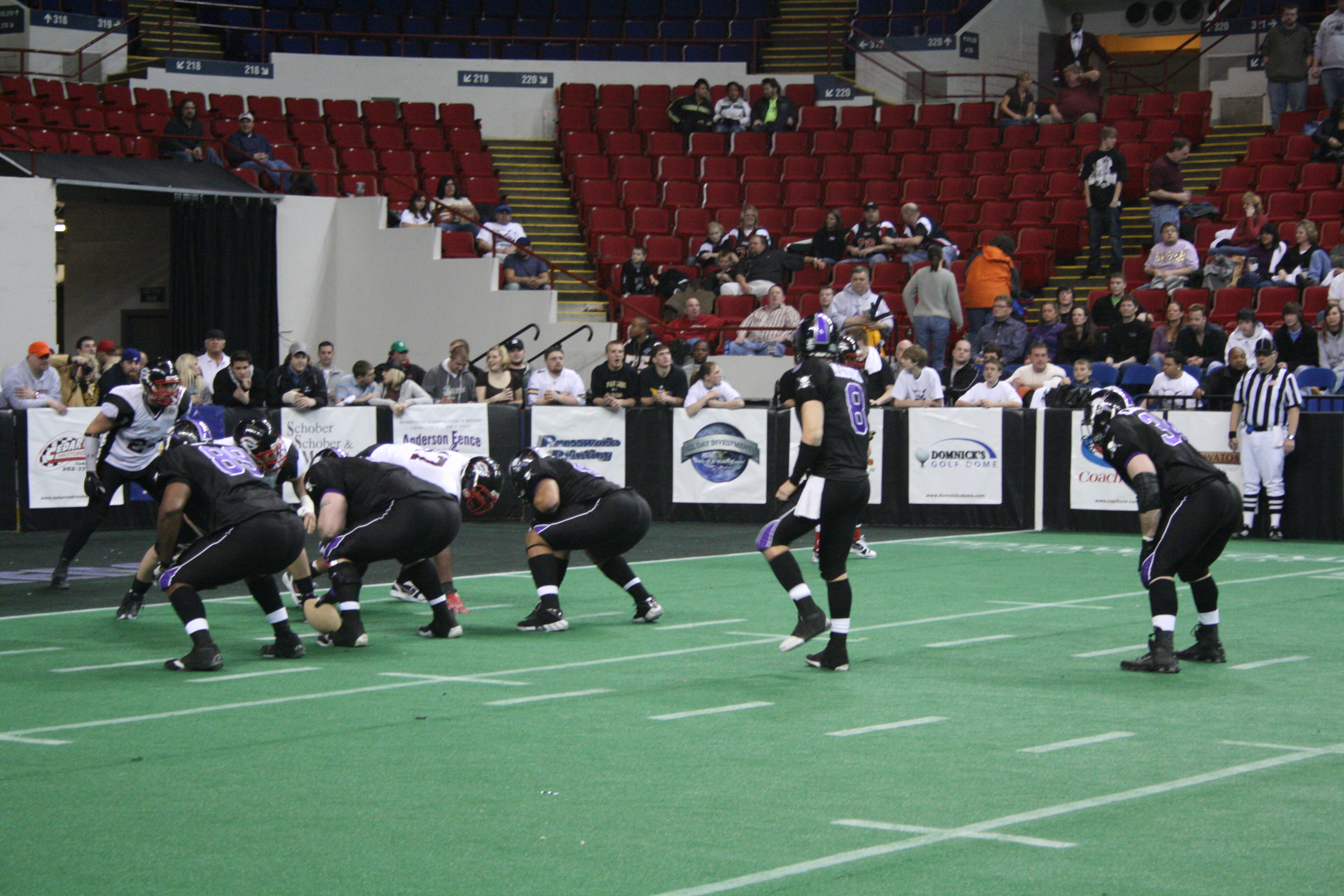
Milwaukee Bonecrushers' quarterback Ryan Maiuri taking a snap against the Chicago Slaughter in 2008.

Base player salaries must be no less than $50 per game and no more than $200 per game. There are no win bonuses since the 2010 season, as agreed at the owner meetings.

For the 2010 season, the weekly team salary cap was $3,000 per week. Any team in violation of the salary cap will be fined and could have either players suspended for the season or forfeiture of games in which they violated the cap. Since then, the league has changed to a weekly salary cap of $2,500 per week, with every player making anywhere from 50 to 200 dollars in a single game.

== Awards ==
=== Current awards ===
- Most Valuable Player (Vincent Cleveland Memorial Trophy)
- Offensive Player of the Year
- Defensive Player of the Year
- Special Teams Player of the Year
- Coach of the Year

=== Discontinued awards ===
- Quarterback of the Year
- Running Back of the Year
- Wide Receiver of the Year
- Linebacker of the Year
- Defensive Back of the Year
- Return Man of the Year
- GLIFL All-Star Game MVP
- All-Purpose Player of the Year

=== Past winners ===
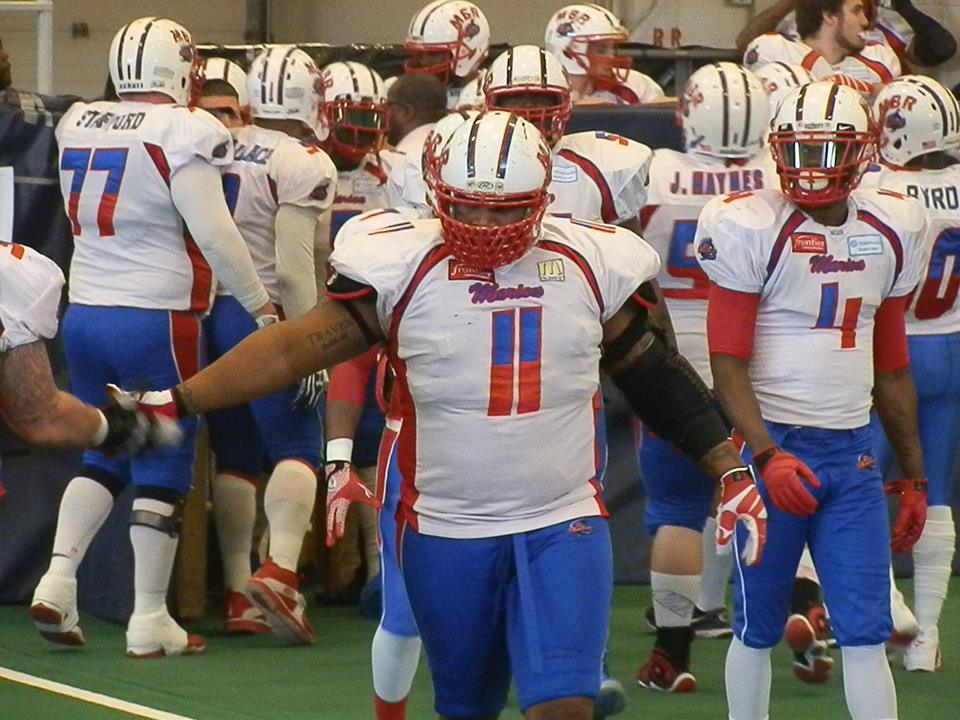
2014 MVP, Thomas McKenzie.

==== 2006 ====
- Most Valuable Player (Vincent Cleveland Memorial Trophy) – Matt Cottengim, Rochester Raiders
- Offensive Player of the Year – Matt Cottengim, Rochester Raiders
- Quarterback of the Year – Matt Cottengim, Rochester Raiders
- Running Back of the Year – Rayshawn Askew, Port Huron Pirates
- Wide Receiver of the Year – Maurice Jackson, Rochester Raiders
- Defensive Player of the Year – Eddie Bynes, Port Huron Pirates
- Linebacker of the Year – Ed Chan, NY/NJ Revolution
- Defensive Back of the Year – Eric Gardner, Battle Creek Crunch
- Kicker of the Year – Chris Reed, Lehigh Valley Outlawz
- Return Man of the Year – Darius Smith, Rochester Raiders
- GLIFL All-Star Game MVP – Shane Franzer, Port Huron Pirates
- Coach of the Year – Brian Hug, Port Huron Pirates

==== 2007 ====
- Most Valuable Player (Vincent Cleveland Memorial Trophy) – Robert Height, Port Huron Pirates
- Offensive Player of the Year – Robert Height, Port Huron Pirates
- Defensive Player of the Year – Eddie Bynes, Port Huron Pirates
- Special Teams Player of the Year – Brad Selent, Kalamazoo Xplosion
- CIFL Indoor Championship Game Most Valuable Player – Mike Condello, Rochester Raiders
- Coach of the Year – Karl Featherstone, Port Huron Pirates

==== 2008 ====
- CIFL Most Valuable Player – David Gater, Kalamazoo Xplosion
- Offensive Player of the Year – Randy Bell, Rock River Raptors
- Defensive Player of the Year – David Gater, Kalamazoo Xplosion
- Special Teams Player of the Year – Brad Selent, Kalamazoo Xplosion
- Coach of the Year – Mike Sparks, Kalamazoo Xplosion

==== 2009 ====
- CIFL Most Valuable Player – Russ Michna, Chicago Slaughter
- Offensive Player of the Year – Russ Michna, Chicago Slaughter
- Defensive Player of the Year – Bryceon Lawrence, Marion Mayhem
- Special Teams Player of the Year -
- Coach of the Year – Matt Land, Fort Wayne Freedom

==== 2010 ====
- CIFL Most Valuable Player – Ben Mauk QB, Cincinnati Commandos
- Offensive Player of the Year – Dominick Goodman WR, Cincinnati Commandos
- Co-Defensive Players of the Year – James Spikes DL, Cincinnati Commandos / Tramaine Billie LB, Fort Wayne Firehawks
- Special Teams Player of the Year – Mike Tatum WR, Marion Mayhem / Fort Wayne Firehawks
- All-Purpose Player of the Year – Brandon Wogoman WR, Chicago Cardinals (CIFL) / Wisconsin Wolfpack
- Co-Coaches of the Year – Brian Wells Miami Valley Silverbacks / Billy Back Cincinnati Commandos

==== 2011 ====
- CIFL Most Valuable Player – Tyler Sheehan QB, Cincinnati Commandos
- Offensive Player of the Year – Tyler Sheehan QB, Cincinnati Commandos
- Defensive Player of the Year – Chris Respress DB, Dayton Silverbacks
- Special Teams Player of the Year – Mike Tatum WR, Marion Blue Racers
- Coach of the Year – Ryan Terry Marion Blue Racers

==== 2012 ====
- CIFL Most Valuable Player – Tommy Jones QB, Saginaw Sting
- Offensive Player of the Year – Tommy Jones QB, Saginaw Sting
- Defensive Player of the Year – Melvin Thomas DB, Dayton Silverbacks
- Special Teams Player of the Year – C. J. Tarver WR, Saginaw Sting
- Coach of the Year – James Scott Dayton Silverbacks

==== 2013 ====
- CIFL Most Valuable Player – C. J. Tarver WR, Saginaw Sting
- Offensive Player of the Year – Tommy Jones QB, Dayton Sharks
- Defensive Player of the Year – Kwaheem Smith DB, Erie Explosion
- Special Teams Player of the Year – C. J. Tarver WR, Saginaw Sting
- Coach of the Year – Shawn Liotta, Erie Explosion

==== 2014 ====
- CIFL Most Valuable Player – Thomas McKenzie DL, Marion Blue Racers
- Offensive Player of the Year – Aaron Smetanka QB, Erie Explosion
- Defensive Player of the Year – Spencer Smith LB, Saginaw Sting
- Special Teams Player of the Year – Julie Harshbarger K, Chicago Blitz
- Coach of the Year – LaMonte Coleman, Marion Blue Racers
