= List of Chicago Slaughter seasons =

This list of Chicago Slaughter seasons details the history of the Chicago Slaughter professional indoor football franchise and from its 2007–2009 tenure in the Continental Indoor Football League and 2010 to 2013 run in the Indoor Football League.

One of just nine teams competing in the IFL for the 2013 season, the Chicago Slaughter were members of the United Conference. For the team's entire journey, it was coached by Steve "Mongo" McMichael and played its home games at the Sears Centre in Hoffman Estates, Illinois.

== Continental Indoor Football League ==
=== 2007 season schedule ===
Date	Opponent	Home/Away	Result
March 30	Miami Valley Silverbacks	Away	Won 66–44
April 14	Kalamazoo Xplosion	Away	Lost 21–34
April 21	New England Surge	Away	Won 38–35
April 28	Muskegon Thunder	Home	Won 57–40
May 5	Rochester Raiders	Home	Lost 40–49
May 12	Marion Mayhem	Away	Won 55–30
May 20	Kalamazoo Xplosion	Home	Won 51–47
May 25	Miami Valley Silverbacks	Home	Won 48–47
June 3	Springfield Stallions	Away	Won 69–44
June 9	Muskegon Thunder	Away	Won 58–34
June 16	Port Huron Pirates	Home	Lost 12–46
June 24	Springfield Stallions (Springfield forfeits)	Home	Won 2–0
June 24	Capital City Outlaws (Non-league exhibition)	Home	Won 61–6
June 30	Miami Valley Silverbacks (Playoffs)	Home	Won 60–28
July 7	Kalamazoo Xplosion (Playoffs)	Away	Lost 40–51

=== 2007 CIFL standings ===
2007 Continental Indoor Football League
Team	Overall				Division			
Team	W	L	T	PCT	W	L	T	PCT
Great Lakes Conference
Michigan Pirates-y	12	0	0	1.000	10	0	0	1.000
Kalamazoo Xplosion-x	10	2	0	.833	10	2	0	.833
Chicago Slaughter-x	9	3	0	.750	8	2	0	.800
Marion Mayhem-x	6	6	0	.500	6	5	0	.545
Muskegon Thunder-x	4	8	0	.333	4	7	0	.364
Miami Valley Silverbacks	4	8	0	.333	3	7	0	.300
Summit County Rumble	1	11	0	.083	0	7	0	.000
Springfield Stallions	0	12	0	.000	0	11	0	.000
Atlantic Conference
Rochester Raiders-y	10	2	0	.833	90	0	0	1.000
New England Surge-x	8	4	0	.667	8	3	0	.727
Lehigh Valley Outlawz-x	7	5	0	.583	5	5	0	.500
Chesapeake Tide-x	7	5	0	.583	6	5	0	.545
Steubenville Stampede	5	7	0	.417	2	6	0	.250
NY/NJ Revolution	1	11	0	.083	0	11	0	.000

=== 2008 season schedule ===
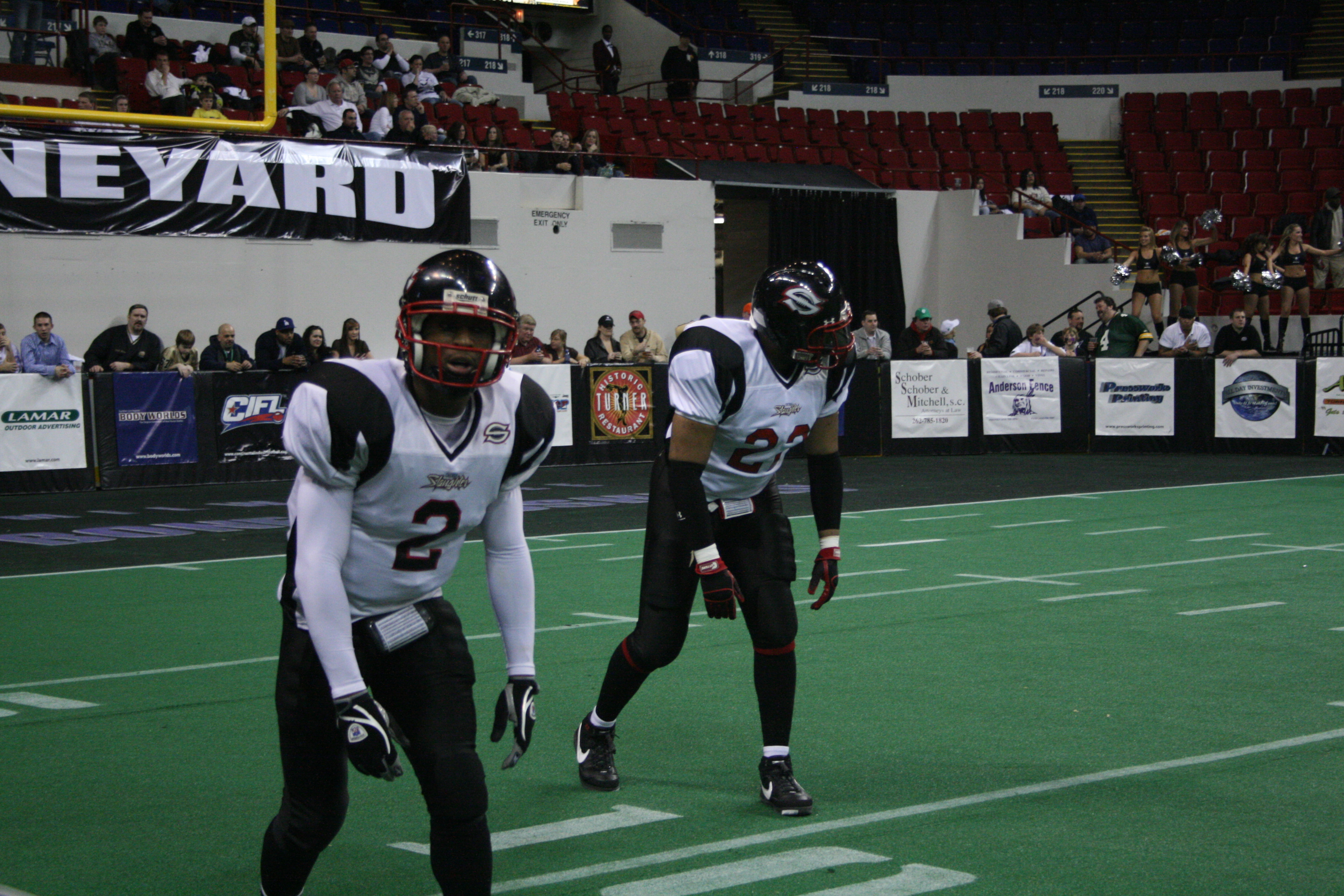
Dontrell Jackson and JR Taylor lining up for the snap against the Milwaukee Bonecrushers

Date	Opponent	Home/Away	Result
March 7	Kalamazoo Xplosion	Home	Lost 39–46 (OT)
March 22	Milwaukee Bonecrushers	Away	Won 64–41
March 29	Rock River Raptors	Away	Lost 45–55
April 4	Miami Valley Silverbacks	Home	Won 58–37
April 11	Kalamazoo Xplosion	Away	Lost 48–54
April 19	Milwaukee Bonecrushers	Home	Won 56–18
April 25	Muskegon Thunder	Away	Won 27–10
May 3	Rock River Raptors	Home	Won 67–59
May 9	Marion Mayhem	Away	Won 41–38
May 17	Fort Wayne Freedom	Home	Won 41–33
May 24	Saginaw Sting	Away	Lost 28–53
May 31	Muskegon Thunder	Home	Won 38–35
June 13	Rock River Raptors (Playoffs)	Home	Lost 39–54

=== 2008 CIFL standings ===
2008 Continental Indoor Football League
Team	Overall				Division			
Team	W	L	T	PCT	W	L	T	PCT
Great Lakes Conference
East Division
Kalamazoo Xplosion-y	11	1	0	.917	5	1	0	.833
Muskegon Thunder-x	5	7	0	.417	2	2	0	.500
Fort Wayne Freedom	5	7	0	.417	2	4	0	.333
Miami Valley Silverbacks	3	9	0	.250	1	2	0	.333
West Division
Chicago Slaughter-y	8	4	0	.667	3	1	0	.750
Rock River Raptors-x	7	5	0	.583	3	1	0	.750
Milwaukee Bonecrushers	1	11	0	.083	0	4	0	.000
Atlantic Conference
East Division
New England Surge-y	8	3	0	.727	5	1	0	.833
Lehigh Valley Outlawz-x	7	5	0	.583	4	2	0	.667
New Jersey Revolution	3	9	0	.250	2	5	0	.286
Chesapeake Tide	2	10	0	.583	0	2	0	.000
West Division
Rochester Raiders-z	12	0	0	1.000	4	0	0	1.000
Saginaw Sting-y	10	2	0	.833	3	1	0	.750
Marion Mayhem-x	7	5	0	.583	0	2	0	.000
Flint Phantoms	1	11	0	.083	0	4	0	.000

=== 2009 season schedule ===
Date	Opponent	Home/Away	Result
March 6	Milwaukee Bonecrushers	Home	Won 84–24
March 21	Wisconsin Wolfpack	Away	Won 40–36
March 27	Rock River Raptors	Home	Won 69–38
April 4	Wheeling Wildcats	Away	Won 67–59
April 11	Marion Mayhem	Home	Won 74–60
April 18	Fort Wayne Freedom	Away	Won 56–41
April 25	Milwaukee Bonecrushers	Home	Won 78–25
May 2	Wheeling Wildcats	Home	Won 61–38
May 9	Rock River Raptors	Away	Won 77–47
May 16	Wisconsin Wolfpack	Home	Won 67–22
May 22	Milwaukee Bonecrushers	Away	Won 70–49
May 30	Wisconsin Wolfpack	Away	Won 49–14
June 20	Wisconsin Wolfpack (Playoffs)	Home	Won 63–19
June 27	Fort Wayne Freedom (Championship Game)	Home	Won 58–48

=== 2009 CIFL standings ===
2009 Continental Indoor Football League
Team	Overall				Division			
Team	W	L	T	PCT	W	L	T	PCT
East Division
Marion Mayhem-y	9	3	0	.750	8	1	0	.889
Fort Wayne Freedom-x	6	5	0	.545	5	2	0	.294
Wheeling Wildcats	2	10	0	.167	2	5	0	.286
Miami Valley Silverbacks	0	10	0	.000	0	7	0	.000
West Division
Chicago Slaughter-y	12	0	0	1.000	8	0	0	1.000
Wisconsin Wolfpack-x	7	5	0	.583	4	4	0	.500
Rock River Raptors	7	5	0	.583	3	5	0	.167
Milwaukee Bonecrushers	3	8	0	.273	1	7	0	.167

== Indoor Football League ==
=== 2010 season schedule ===
Date	Opponent	Home/Away	Result
February 27	Rochester Raiders	Home	Lost 47–49
March 13	Richmond Revolution	Away	Lost 25–30
March 21	Bloomington Extreme	Home	Lost 26–27
March 27	Alaska Wild	Home	Won 34–33
April 10	Bloomington Extreme	Away	Won 50–43
April 24	Kent Predators	Home	Won 71–29
April 30	La Crosse Spartans	Away	Lost 29–36
May 8	Green Bay Blizzard	Away	Won 46–43
May 15	Bloomington Extreme	Away	Lost 30–33
May 22	Green Bay Blizzard	Home	Won 50–47
May 28	West Michigan ThunderHawks	Home	Won 83–49
June 5	Rochester Raiders	Away	Lost 36–43
June 12	La Crosse Spartans	Home	Lost 20–27
June 19	Green Bay Blizzard	Away	Lost 30–55
June 26	Green Bay Blizzard (Playoffs)	Away	Won 46–39
July 3	Sioux Falls Storm (Playoffs)	Away	Lost 33–47

=== 2010 IFL standings ===
2010 Central North Division
	W	L	T	PCT	GB	DIV	PF	PA	STK
y-Green Bay Blizzard	10	4	0	0.714	---	4-3	686	538	W3
x-Bloomington Extreme	9	5	0	0.643	1.0	6-2	497	435	W6
x-Chicago Slaughter	6	8	0	0.429	4.0	3-5	577	543	L3
La Crosse Spartans	3	11	0	0.214	7.0	2-5	355	565	L1

=== 2011 season schedule ===
Week	Date	Kickoff	Opponent	Results	
Week	Date	Kickoff	Opponent	Final score	Team record
0*	February 19 (Sat)	7:00 pm	@La Crosse Spartans	W 69–48	1–0
1	February 26 (Sat)	7:05 pm	Omaha Beef	L 36–39	1–1
2	March 5 (Sat)	7:05 pm	Reading Express	W 59–55	2–1
3	Bye				
4	Bye				
5	March 25 (Fri)	7:35 pm	Kent Predators	W 37–36	3–1
6	April 1 (Fri)	7:05 pm	@Bloomington Extreme	L 44–52	3–2
7	April 9 (Sat)	7:05 pm	La Crosse Spartans	W 54–40	4–2
8	April 16 (Sat)	7:05 pm (6:05 Central)	@Lehigh Valley Steelhawks	W 52–27	5–2
9	April 22 (Fri)	7:05 pm (10:05 Central)	@Fairbanks Grizzlies	L 35–40	5–3
10	April 29 (Fri)	7:35 pm	Green Bay Blizzard	W 42–39	6–3
11	May 7 (Sat)	7:05 pm (6:05 Central)	@Richmond Revolution	W 49–46	7–3
12	May 14 (Sat)	7:05 pm	Bloomington Extreme	W 42–16	8–3
13	May 21 (Sat)	7:05 pm	@Omaha Beef	L 29–48	8–4
14	Bye				
15	June 4 (Sat)	7:05 pm	Sioux Falls Storm	L 28–76	8–5
16	June 10 (Fri)	7:30 pm	@Green Bay Blizzard	L 48–65	8–6
Playoffs
1	June 18 (Sat)	7:00 pm (6:00 Central)	@Reading Express	L 33–76	---

* = Kickoff Classic Game, before week 1 starts.

=== 2011 IFL standings ===
2011 Great Lakes Division
	W	L	T	PCT	PF	PA	DIV	GB	STK
y Green Bay Blizzard	11	3	0	0.786	764	508	4–2	—	W4
x Bloomington Extreme	9	5	0	0.643	561	473	4–2	2.0	L1
x Chicago Slaughter	8	6	0	0.571	624	627	4–2	3.0	L3
La Crosse Spartans	5	9	0	0.357	495	633	0–6	6.0	W1

=== 2012 season schedule ===
Week	Date	Kickoff	Opponent	Results	
Week	Date	Kickoff	Opponent	Final score	Team record
1	February 19 (Sun)	2:08 pm	Bloomington Edge	W 50–34	1–0
2	February 24 (Fri)	7:35 pm (6:35 Central)	@Lehigh Valley Steelhawks	L 28–30	1–1
2	March 3 (Sat)	7:05 pm	@Bloomington Edge	L 35–44	1–2
3	Bye				
4	Bye				
5	March 23 (Fri)	7:05 pm	@Cedar Rapids Titans	L 40–52	1–3
6	March 31 (Sat)	7:05 pm	Bloomington Edge	L 65–70	1–4
7	April 8 (Sun)	4:05 pm	@Sioux Falls Storm	L 45–73	1–5
8	April 13 (Fri)	7:30	@Green Bay Blizzard	L 36–63	1–6
9	April 21 (Sat)	7:05 pm	Green Bay Blizzard	W 45–42	2–6
10	April 28 (Sat)	7:00 pm (6:00 Central)	@Lehigh Valley Steelhawks	W 54–51	3–6
11	May 5 (Sat)	7:05 pm	Cedar Rapids Titans	W 41–38	4–6
12	Bye				
13	May 18 (Fri)	7:35 pm	Reading Express	W 67–50	5–6
14	May 25 (Fri)	7:05 pm	@Bloomington Edge	L 43–62	5–7
15	June 2 (Sat)	7:00 pm (6:00 Central)	@Reading Express	W 46–40	6–7
16	June 8 (Fri)	7:35 pm	Lehigh Valley Steelhawks	L 53–54	6–8

* = Kickoff Classic Game, before week 1 starts.

=== 2012 IFL standings ===
2012 United Conference
	W	L	T	PCT	PF	PA	DIV	GB	STK
y Sioux Falls Storm	14	0	0	1.000	941	563	7-0	---	W14
x Green Bay Blizzard	11	3	0	0.786	787	586	10-3	3.0	W3
x Bloomington Edge	10	4	0	0.714	673	604	10-3	4.0	W1
x Lehigh Valley Steelhawks	6	8	0	0.429	605	615	6-8	8.0	W1
Omaha Beef	6	8	0	0.429	635	696	3-3	4.0	L2
Chicago Slaughter	6	8	0	0.429	657	714	6-8	4.0	L1
Cedar Rapids Titans	4	10	0	0.286	509	631	4-0	10.0	W1
Reading Express	2	12	0	0.143	534	773	7-1	12.0	L5

=== 2013 IFL standings ===
2013 United Conference
	W	L	T	PCT	PF	PA	DIV	GB	STK
y - Sioux Falls Storm	10	4	0	.714	645	500	4-2	0.0	W3
x - Cedar Rapids Titans	9	5	0	.643	744	569	6-4	1.0	w2
Chicago Slaughter	9	5	0	.643	598	602	6-5	1.0	W2
Texas Revolution	5	9	0	.357	563	747	3-4	6.0	L2
Green Bay Blizzard	4	10	0	.286	622	652	2-6	6.0	L5
