= Chesapeake Tide =

American indoor football team

Logo

General information
- Founded: 2006
- Folded: 2008
- Headquartered: Upper Marlboro, Maryland at The Show Place Arena
- Colors: Navy, White
- Mascot: Captain Rip Tide

Personnel
- Owners: Martin Johnson (2006–2008); Messay Hailermariam (2008)
- Head coach: Matthew Steeple

Team history
- Chesapeake Tide (2007–2008)

Home fields
- The Show Place Arena (2007–2008)

League / conference affiliations
- Continental Indoor Football League (2007–2008): Atlantic Division (2007); Atlantic Conference (2008); Eastern Division (2008)

Playoff appearances (1)
- 2007

The Chesapeake Tide were a former professional indoor football team based in Upper Marlboro, Maryland. The team began play in 2007 as an expansion team in the Continental Indoor Football League. The founding owner of the Tide was Martin Johnson. The Tide played its home games at The Show Place Arena. Midway through the 2008 season the team was acquired by Messay Hailermariam. Hailermariam folded the team at the end of the season and founded the Maryland Maniacs. Despite playing in the same arena with the same head coach, the Maniacs were not a continuation of the Tide.

== Franchise history ==
=== 2007 ===
The Tide's inaugural game drew in a crowd of 3,176 fans.

==== Schedule ====
Date	Opponent	Home/Away	Result
April 1	New England Surge	Home	Won 37–30
April 13	Steubenville Stampede	Away	Lost 55–65
April 21	Rochester Raiders	Home	Lost 49–89
April 28	Rochester Raiders	Away	Lost 18–52
May 5	Lehigh Valley Outlawz	Home	Won 57–56 (OT)
May 12	NY/NJ Revolution	Home	Won 41–15
May 19	New England Surge	Away	Lost 39–62
May 26	NY/NJ Revolution	Away	Won 55–43
June 2	Summit County Rumble	Away	Won 58–53
June 9	Lehigh Valley Outlawz	Away	Lost 26–48
June 16	Miami Valley Silverbacks	Home	Won 54–53
June 23	Steubenville Stampede	Home	Won 64–24
July 7	Rochester Raiders (Playoffs)	Away	Lost 43–76

==== Standings ====
2007 Continental Indoor Football League
Team	Overall				Division			
Team	W	L	T	PCT	W	L	T	PCT
Great Lakes Conference
Michigan Pirates-y	12	0	0	1.000	10	0	0	1.000
Kalamazoo Xplosion-x	10	2	0	.833	10	2	0	.833
Chicago Slaughter-x	9	3	0	.750	8	2	0	.800
Marion Mayhem-x	6	6	0	.500	6	5	0	.545
Muskegon Thunder-x	4	8	0	.333	4	7	0	.364
Miami Valley Silverbacks	4	8	0	.333	3	7	0	.300
Summit County Rumble	1	11	0	.083	0	7	0	.000
Springfield Stallions	0	12	0	.000	0	11	0	.000
Atlantic Conference
Rochester Raiders-y	10	2	0	.833	90	0	0	1.000
New England Surge-x	8	4	0	.667	8	3	0	.727
Lehigh Valley Outlawz-x	7	5	0	.583	5	5	0	.500
Chesapeake Tide-x	7	5	0	.583	6	5	0	.545
Steubenville Stampede	5	7	0	.417	2	6	0	.250
NY/NJ Revolution	1	11	0	.083	0	11	0	.000

=== 2008 ===
The Tide won the final game of their existence, on the road, against the New Jersey Revolution. The team was led by 7 touchdown passes from quarterback Joe Urso, and running back – wide receiver Darryl Overton's four scores (three receiving, one rushing), wide receiver's Daryl Disbrow Jr. and Ray McCarter were also recipients of Urso's touchdown passes.

==== Schedule ====
Date	Opponent	Home/Away	Result
March 21	Rochester Raiders	Home	Lost 36–43
March 29	Marion Mayhem	Away	Lost 35–70
April 5	New England Surge	Home	Lost 41–49
April 12	Lehigh Valley Outlawz	Away	Lost 36–62
April 19	New Jersey Revolution	Away	Lost 47–49
April 27	Lehigh Valley Outlawz	Home	Lost 17–50
May 3	New Jersey Revolution	Home	Won 65–46
May 10	New England Surge	Away	Lost 24–46
May 17	Rochester Raiders	Away	Lost 13–58
May 24	Marion Mayhem	Home	Lost 39–67
May 31	Fort Wayne Freedom	Home	Lost 31–37
June 7	New Jersey Revolution	Away	Won 55–48

==== Standings ====
2008 Continental Indoor Football League
Team	Overall				Division			
Team	W	L	T	PCT	W	L	T	PCT
Great Lakes Conference
East Division
Kalamazoo Xplosion-y	11	1	0	.917	5	1	0	.833
Muskegon Thunder-x	5	7	0	.417	2	2	0	.500
Fort Wayne Freedom	5	7	0	.417	2	4	0	.333
Miami Valley Silverbacks	3	9	0	.250	1	2	0	.333
West Division
Chicago Slaughter-y	8	4	0	.667	3	1	0	.750
Rock River Raptors-x	7	5	0	.583	3	1	0	.750
Milwaukee Bonecrushers	1	11	0	.083	0	4	0	.000
Atlantic Conference
East Division
New England Surge-y	8	3	0	.727	5	1	0	.833
Lehigh Valley Outlawz-x	7	5	0	.583	4	2	0	.667
New Jersey Revolution	3	9	0	.250	2	5	0	.286
Chesapeake Tide	2	10	0	.583	0	2	0	.000
West Division
Rochester Raiders-z	12	0	0	1.000	4	0	0	1.000
Saginaw Sting-y	10	2	0	.833	3	1	0	.750
Marion Mayhem-x	7	5	0	.583	0	2	0	.000
Flint Phantoms	1	11	0	.083	0	4	0	.000
