= Lehigh =

Lehigh most often refers to:

- Lehigh County, Pennsylvania
- Lehigh University, a private research university located in Bethlehem, Pennsylvania

Lehigh may also refer to:

== Businesses ==
- Lehigh & Susquehanna Turnpike (1804) a wagon road connecting Philadelphia, and other communities of the Lehigh and Delaware valleys to Western New York State and Lake Erie
- Lehigh Canal (1818) a privately funded canal
- Lehigh Coal & Navigation Company (1818-1986) builders of the Lehigh Canal
- Lehigh Coal and Navigation Company (1988–2010), a mining company
- Lehigh Crane Iron Company, a US foundry in operation from 1839 to 1899
- Lehigh Defense, an ammunition maker
- Lehigh Company, an US truck manufacturer

== Places ==
=== Canada ===
- Lehigh, Alberta, Canada

=== United States ===
- Lehigh, Illinois
- Lehigh, Iowa
- Lehigh, Kansas
- Lehigh, Oklahoma
- Lehigh, Barbour County, West Virginia
- Lehigh, Wisconsin
- Lehigh Canal, constructed along the Lehigh River
- Lehigh County Ballpark, an athletic field in Allentown, Pennsylvania
- Lehigh Gap, Pennsylvania, a mountain gap formed by the Lehigh River
- Lehigh Township (disambiguation)
- Lehigh Parkway, a park in Allentown
- Lehigh River, a tributary of the Delaware River
- Lehigh Street, a major road connecting Emmaus and Allentown, Pennsylvania
- Lehigh Tunnel, a tunnel on the Northeast Extension of the Pennsylvania Turnpike
- Lehigh Valley (disambiguation), a major metropolitan region in eastern Pennsylvania
- Little Lehigh Creek, a tributary of Jordan Creek

== Railroads ==
- Lehigh and Hudson River Railway
- Lehigh and Mahanoy Railroad, an LC&N subsidiary
- Lehigh and New England Railroad, an LC&N subsidiary
- Lehigh Valley Railroad
- Lehigh Line (disambiguation)

== Other ==
- 691 Lehigh, a minor planet orbiting the Sun
- USS Lehigh (1863)

== See also ==
- Lehigh High School (disambiguation)
