= 2008 Milwaukee Bonecrushers season =

CIFL season

- Owner: Bonecrusher Ent.
- General manager: Chris Kokalis(resigned on April 8); Jordan Kopac (interim)
- Head coach: Gilbert Brown (resigned on April 8; 0–3 record); Michael Tumbleson (interim)
- Home stadium: U.S. Cellular Arena; 400 W. Kilbourn Avenue; Milwaukee, WI 53203

Results
- Record: 1-11
- Conference place: 4th
- Playoffs: did not qualify

The 2008 Milwaukee Bonecrushers season was the 1st season for the Continental Indoor Football League (CIFL) expansion franchise. The franchise made an immediate splash in Milwaukee when it announced former Green Bay Packer Gilbert Brown signed a three-year contract to be the team's first head coach. However, the optimism quickly faded when Brown announced he was resigning from the position after just three games on April 8, 2008. Much of the team's staff and many of the team's players also left at the same time, raising eyebrows among the Milwaukee media and fans. The Bonecrushers finished 2008 with a hodgepodge of players and coaches, winning just one game, a 51-46 road contest against the Muskegon Thunder featuring a 26-yard touchdown run by Bonecrushers' quarterback Brian Ryczkowski on the final play of the game.

The rumored reasoning behind the exodus of many of the original members of the franchise was the team's inability to pay its bills or personnel. This was confirmed when a judgment was entered against the Bonecrushers in favor of Challenger Industries, the company that sold the team its game field AstroTurf, in the amount of $29,539.29 on October 15, 2008. Challenger resolved its claim against John Burns, one of the owners of the Milwaukee Bonecrushers, prior to the matter going to trial.

== Schedule ==
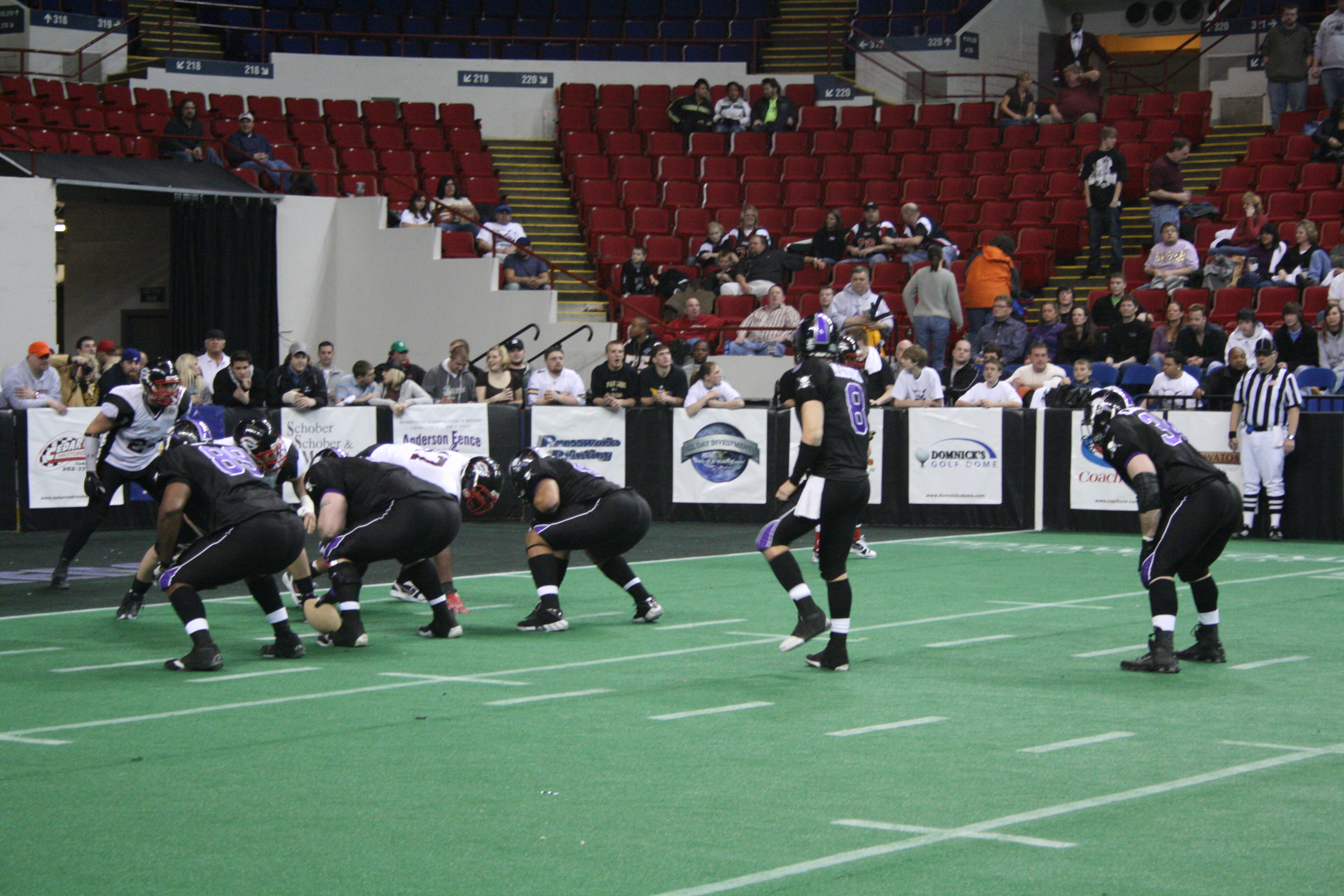
Bonecrushers' Quarterback, Ryan Maiuri, taking a snap against the Chicago Slaughter during the March 21, 2008 game

Date	Opponent	Home/Away	Result
March 21	Chicago Slaughter	Home	Lost 41-64
March 29	Muskegon Thunder	Home	Lost 35-60
April 6	Flint Phantoms	Home	Lost 53-62
April 12	Marion Mayhem	Away	Lost 19-43
April 19	Chicago Slaughter	Away	Lost 18-56
April 27	Miami Valley Silverbacks	Home	Lost 42-43
April 30	Saginaw Sting	Away	Lost 28-51
May 9	New Jersey Revolution	Away	Lost 32-56
May 17	Muskegon Thunder	Away	Won 51-46
May 23	Rock River Raptors	Home	Lost 3-56
May 31	Saginaw Sting	Home	Lost 28-54
June 7	Rock River Raptors	Away	Lost 29-53

== Standings ==
2008 Continental Indoor Football League
Team	Overall				Division			
Team	W	L	T	PCT	W	L	T	PCT
Great Lakes Conference
East Division
Kalamazoo Xplosion-y	11	1	0	.917	5	1	0	.833
Muskegon Thunder-x	5	7	0	.417	2	2	0	.500
Fort Wayne Freedom	5	7	0	.417	2	4	0	.333
Miami Valley Silverbacks	3	9	0	.250	1	2	0	.333
West Division
Chicago Slaughter-y	8	4	0	.667	3	1	0	.750
Rock River Raptors-x	7	5	0	.583	3	1	0	.750
Milwaukee Bonecrushers	1	11	0	.083	0	4	0	.000
Atlantic Conference
East Division
New England Surge-y	8	3	0	.727	5	1	0	.833
Lehigh Valley Outlawz-x	7	5	0	.583	4	2	0	.667
New Jersey Revolution	3	9	0	.250	2	5	0	.286
Chesapeake Tide	2	10	0	.583	0	2	0	.000
West Division
Rochester Raiders-z	12	0	0	1.000	4	0	0	1.000
Saginaw Sting-y	10	2	0	.833	3	1	0	.750
Marion Mayhem-x	7	5	0	.583	0	2	0	.000
Flint Phantoms	1	11	0	.083	0	4	0	.000
