= Jermaine Hampton =

American football player (born 1979)

No. 47
- Position: Cornerback

Personal information
- Born: June 12, 1979 (age 47); Riverdale, Illinois, U.S.
- Listed height: 6 ft 0 in (1.83 m)
- Listed weight: 205 lb (93 kg)

Career information
- High school: Thornton Township (Harvey, Illinois)
- College: Northern Illinois
- NFL draft: 2001: undrafted

Career history
- Indianapolis Colts (2001–2002); Rock River Raptors (2006–2008)

Awards and highlights
- First-team All-MAC (2000); Second-team All-MAC (1999)
- Stats at Pro Football Reference

Jermaine Hampton (born June 12, 1979) is an American former professional football cornerback who played for the Indianapolis Colts of the National Football League (NFL). He played college football for the Northern Illinois Huskies.

== Early life ==
Jermaine Hampton was born on June 12, 1979, in Riverdale, Illinois. He played high school football and basketball at Thornton Township High School in Harvey, Illinois.

== College career ==
In February 1997, Hampton committed to play college football for the Western Michigan Broncos. He later switched to Northern Illinois University but was ruled ineligible for the 1997 season. He was then a three-year letterman for the Huskies from 1998 to 2000, playing in 33 games while recording 302 tackles. Hampton earned second-team All-Mid-American Conference (MAC) honors in 1999 and first-team All-MAC honors in 2000.

== Professional career ==
After going undrafted in the 2001 NFL draft, Hampton signed with the Indianapolis Colts on April 26, 2001. He played in ten games for the Colts, posting seven solo tackles and two assisted tackles, before being placed on injured reserve on November 29, 2001. On August 26, 2002, he was placed on the reserve/physically unable to perform list due to a bad back. Hampton was released on February 26, 2003.

Hampton later played indoor football for the Rock River Raptors from 2006 to 2008.

== Post-playing career ==
On October 26, 2021, Hampton was named the defensive coordinator for the Iowa Barnstormers of the Indoor Football League.
