= 2008 Marion Mayhem season =

- Owner: R.A. Mallonn; Fred Horner; Tim Cugini; John Slebodnik
- Head coach: Pepe Pearson
- Home stadium: Veterans Memorial Coliseum; 220 East Fairground Street; Marion, OH 43302

Results
- Record: 7–5
- Division place: 3rd Atlantic West
- Playoffs: Lost Atlantic Conference Semifinals 34-41 (Sting)

The 2008 Marion Mayhem season was the third season for the Continental Indoor Football League (CIFL) franchise. Finishing with a 7–5 record in 2008, the Mayhem were eliminated from the 2008 CIFL playoffs. The Mayhem players had already turned in their equipment for the year when it was announced that the defending CIFL champion Rochester Raiders (12-0) had been suspended by the league and had to forfeit their playoff spot. The Mayhem were invited to replace the former champs in the CIFL Atlantic Conference Western Division playoffs where they would face their conference foe Saginaw. The Mayhem gathered their players back together and headed to Saginaw to face the Sting. The playoff game went down to the wire where a goal-line stand by the Saginaw defense with only seconds left on the clock ended the Mayhem's season. The final score Sting 41 - Mayhem 34.

== Schedule ==
Date	Opponent	Home/Away	Result
March 8	Muskegon Thunder	Away	W 34-33
March 21	Saginaw Sting	Away	L 48-54
March 29	Chesapeake Tide	Home	W 70-35
April 5	Rochester Raiders	Home	L 19-52
April 12	Milwaukee Bonecrushers	Home	W 43-19
April 19	Miami Valley Silverbacks	Away	W 61-33
April 26	Fort Wayne Freedom	Away	L 40-55
May 3	Lehigh Valley Outlawz	Away	L 33-44
May 9	Chicago Slaughter	Home	L 38-41
May 16	Lehigh Valley Outlawz	Home	W 36-23
May 24	Chesapeake Tide	Away	W 67-39
June 7	Miami Valley Silverbacks	Home	W 51-44
	2008 CIFL PLAYOFFS		
June 14	Saginaw Sting (Atl Semifinals)	Away	L 34-41

== 2008 standings ==
2008 Continental Indoor Football League
Team	Overall				Division			
Team	W	L	T	PCT	W	L	T	PCT
Great Lakes Conference
East Division
Kalamazoo Xplosion-y	11	1	0	.917	5	1	0	.833
Muskegon Thunder-x	5	7	0	.417	2	2	0	.500
Fort Wayne Freedom	5	7	0	.417	2	4	0	.333
Miami Valley Silverbacks	3	9	0	.250	1	2	0	.333
West Division
Chicago Slaughter-y	8	4	0	.667	3	1	0	.750
Rock River Raptors-x	7	5	0	.583	3	1	0	.750
Milwaukee Bonecrushers	1	11	0	.083	0	4	0	.000
Atlantic Conference
East Division
New England Surge-y	8	3	0	.727	5	1	0	.833
Lehigh Valley Outlawz-x	7	5	0	.583	4	2	0	.667
New Jersey Revolution	3	9	0	.250	2	5	0	.286
Chesapeake Tide	2	10	0	.583	0	2	0	.000
West Division
Rochester Raiders-z	12	0	0	1.000	4	0	0	1.000
Saginaw Sting-y	10	2	0	.833	3	1	0	.750
Marion Mayhem-x	7	5	0	.583	0	2	0	.000
Flint Phantoms	1	11	0	.083	0	4	0	.000
