= 2008 Saginaw Sting season =

- Owner: Mike Trumbull; Esteban Rivera; Mike Johnson
- General manager: Mike Johnson
- Head coach: Karl Featherstone
- Home stadium: Dow Event Center; 303 Johnson Street; Saginaw, MI 78607

Results
- Record: 10–2
- Division place: 2nd
- Playoffs: Won Semifinals 41-34 (Mayhem); Won Atlantic Conference Championship 59-25 (Outlawz); Won CIFL Championship Game 41-37 (Xplosion)

The 2008 Saginaw Sting season was the first season for the American Continental Indoor Football League franchise, who began play as an expansion team. Original team owners were Mike Johnson, Mike Trumbull, and Esteban Rivera, who also owned the Kalamazoo Xplosion. The team was led by former Michigan State quarterback Damon Dowdell, who led the league in passing yards (2,190), touchdowns (54) and completion percentage (62%). Nick Body was Dowdell's favorite target, leading the league in receptions (78), yards (1,005) and touchdowns (31). Despite their offensive numbers, neither player won Offensive Player of the Year or the CIFL MVP. The duo led the Sting to a 10–2 regular season and a playoff berth. On June 29, 2008, the Sting defeated the Xplosion 41–37 to win the CIFL Championship Game.

== Schedule ==
Date	Opponent	Home/Away	Result
March 9	Flint Phantoms	Away	Won 51-25
March 21	Marion Mayhem	Home	Won 54-48
March 29	Miami Valley Silverbacks	Away	Won 70-26
April 4	New Jersey Revolution	Home	Won 48-24
April 11	Flint Phantoms	Home	Won 55-28
April 19	Rochester Raiders	Away	Lost 43-59
April 26	Rock River Raptors	Away	Lost 50-51
May 2	Milwaukee Bonecrushers	Home	Won 51-28
May 10	Fort Wayne Freedom	Away	Won 34-21
May 24	Chicago Slaughter	Home	Won 53-28
May 31	Milwaukee Bonecrushers	Away	Won 54-28
June 6	Muskegon Thunder	Home	Won 60-23
Playoff			
June 14	Marion Mayhem (Playoffs)	Home	Won 41-34
June 23	Lehigh Valley Outlawz (Playoffs)	Home	Won 59-25
June 29	Kalamazoo Xplosion (CIFL Championship)	Away	Won 41-37

== Standings ==
2008 Continental Indoor Football League
Team	Overall				Division			
Team	W	L	T	PCT	W	L	T	PCT
Great Lakes Conference
East Division
Kalamazoo Xplosion-y	11	1	0	.917	5	1	0	.833
Muskegon Thunder-x	5	7	0	.417	2	2	0	.500
Fort Wayne Freedom	5	7	0	.417	2	4	0	.333
Miami Valley Silverbacks	3	9	0	.250	1	2	0	.333
West Division
Chicago Slaughter-y	8	4	0	.667	3	1	0	.750
Rock River Raptors-x	7	5	0	.583	3	1	0	.750
Milwaukee Bonecrushers	1	11	0	.083	0	4	0	.000
Atlantic Conference
East Division
New England Surge-y	8	3	0	.727	5	1	0	.833
Lehigh Valley Outlawz-x	7	5	0	.583	4	2	0	.667
New Jersey Revolution	3	9	0	.250	2	5	0	.286
Chesapeake Tide	2	10	0	.583	0	2	0	.000
West Division
Rochester Raiders-z	12	0	0	1.000	4	0	0	1.000
Saginaw Sting-y	10	2	0	.833	3	1	0	.750
Marion Mayhem-x	7	5	0	.583	0	2	0	.000
Flint Phantoms	1	11	0	.083	0	4	0	.000

== Roster ==
2008 Saginaw Sting roster
Quarterbacks: 7 Damon Dowdell; Running backs: currently vacant; Wide receivers: -- Nick Body	Offensive linemen: currently vacant; Defensive linemen: currently vacant	Linebackers: currently vacant; Defensive backs: currently vacant; Kickers: currently vacant	Injured Reserve: currently vacant; Exempt List: currently vacant; Practice squad: currently vacant; rookies in italics Roster updated June 29, 2008; 2 Active, 0 Inactive, 0 PS
