= New Jersey Revolution =

Logo

General information
- Founded: 2006
- Folded: 2010
- Headquartered: Morristown, New Jersey at the Mennen Arena
- Colors: Navy, red, silver, white

Personnel
- Owners: Champion Sports and Entertainment
- Head coach: Al Forsythe

Team history
- New York/New Jersey Revolution (2006–2007); New Jersey Revolution (2008–2010)

Home fields
- Mennen Arena (2007–2010)

League / conference affiliations
- Great Lakes/Continental Indoor Football League (2006–2008): Atlantic Conference (2007–2008); East Division (2008); American Indoor Football Association (2010): Eastern Division (2010)

The New Jersey Revolution were members of the American Indoor Football Association based in Morristown, New Jersey, with home games at the George Mennen arena. The Revolution name referred to New Jersey's nickname, The Crossroads of the Revolution, as the state was the site of many American Revolution battles. It was the only indoor football team within the proximity of the New York metropolitan area in the 2010 season.

== History ==
The team began play as the New York/New Jersey Revolution in the Great Lakes Indoor Football League's inaugural 2006 season. Although the team was based in New York City, they ended up playing an all road schedule that year. The New York/New Jersey Revolution lost every game they played in 2006 going 0–10 on the season.

Starting in 2007, the team played their home games at the Mennen Arena in Morristown, New Jersey. The New York/New Jersey Revolution went 1–11 in their first season as members of the rebranded Continental Indoor Football League (CIFL). The team won its first game on May 5, 2007, with a 48–47 victory over the Summit County Rumble in Tallmadge, Ohio led by first year head coach Scott Veith.

The team announced they changed their name to the New Jersey Revolution and introduced a new logo for the 2008 season. After losing the season's first four games, the Revs got their second win and first at home, defeating the Chesapeake Tide 49–47 at Mennen Arena. In their second season in the CIFL, the New Jersey Revolution finished with a 3–9 record.

The team was removed from the CIFL prior to the 2009 season and played as an indoor semi-professional franchise for the season. They played three games at home, all victories over other semi-pro teams: 77–18 over the East Penn Sting, 62–0 over the New York State Broncos, and a 69–24 over the Lebanon Valley Cardinals. On October 1, 2009, the Revolution announced they had joined the American Indoor Football Association (AIFA) for the 2010 season.

In the 2010 AIFA season, the NJ Revolution went 0–14 on the season. They lost six home games at the George Mennen Arena, all seven road games and one neutral site game played June 12, 2010, at the Sun National Bank Arena in Trenton, New Jersey, as the road team losing to the Harrisburg Stampede 96–44. The neutral site game was originally announced as an exhibition contest but then listed in the final overall AIFA league standings. The purpose of this game was to announce that in Trenton Steel would be joining the AIFA in 2011.

The New Jersey Revolution ceased operations on September 8, 2010, via a press release thanking the fans. The AIFA suspended operations four months later with many of its teams, including the Trenton Steel, joining the Southern Indoor Football League (SIFL). The AIFA returned in 2012 after the SIFL ceased operations as American Indoor Football (AIF).

== Team and season results ==
=== Season-by-season overall results ===
Season	League	Conference	Division	Regular season				Postseason results
Season	League	Conference	Division	Finish	Wins	Losses	Ties	Postseason results
New York/New Jersey Revolution
2006	GLIFL			6th	0	10	0	Did not qualify
2007	CIFL	Atlantic		6th	1	11	0	Did not qualify
New Jersey Revolution
2008	CIFL	Atlantic	East	3rd	3	9	0	Did not qualify
2009	Independent			—	3	0	0	
2010	AIFA		Eastern	7th	0	14	0	Did not qualify
Totals					7	44	0	

=== 2006 season ===
2006 Great Lakes Indoor Football League
Team	W	L	T	PCT
Port Huron Pirates-y	10	0	0	1.000
Rochester Raiders-x	7	3	0	.700
Lehigh Valley Outlawz-x	5	5	0	.500
Battle Creek Crunch-x	4	6	0	.400
Marion Mayhem	4	6	0	.400
New York/New Jersey Revolution	0	10	0	.000

=== 2007 season ===
2007 Continental Indoor Football League
Team	Overall				Division			
Team	W	L	T	PCT	W	L	T	PCT
Great Lakes Conference
Michigan Pirates-y	12	0	0	1.000	10	0	0	1.000
Kalamazoo Xplosion-x	10	2	0	.833	10	2	0	.833
Chicago Slaughter-x	9	3	0	.750	8	2	0	.800
Marion Mayhem-x	6	6	0	.500	6	5	0	.545
Muskegon Thunder-x	4	8	0	.333	4	7	0	.364
Miami Valley Silverbacks	4	8	0	.333	3	7	0	.300
Summit County Rumble	1	11	0	.083	0	7	0	.000
Springfield Stallions	0	12	0	.000	0	11	0	.000
Atlantic Conference
Rochester Raiders-y	10	2	0	.833	90	0	0	1.000
New England Surge-x	8	4	0	.667	8	3	0	.727
Lehigh Valley Outlawz-x	7	5	0	.583	5	5	0	.500
Chesapeake Tide-x	7	5	0	.583	6	5	0	.545
Steubenville Stampede	5	7	0	.417	2	6	0	.250
NY/NJ Revolution	1	11	0	.083	0	11	0	.000

Date	Opponent	Home/Away	Result
March 24	Steubenville Stampede	Away	Lost 3–70
April 7	Lehigh Valley Outlawz	Away	Lost 25–45
April 14	New England Surge	Away	Lost 6–61
April 21	Lehigh Valley Outlawz	Home	Lost 29–46
April 28	New England Surge	Home	Lost 21–39
May 5	Summit County Rumble	Away	Won 48–47
May 12	Chesapeake Tide	Away	Lost 15–31
May 19	Rochester Raiders	Away	Lost 0–62
May 26	Chesapeake Tide	Home	Lost 43-55
June 9	Rochester Raiders	Home	Lost 21–56
June 16	Summit County Rumble	Home	Lost 27–38
June 23	New England Surge	Home	Lost 20–34

=== 2008 season ===
2008 Continental Indoor Football League
Team	Overall				Division			
Team	W	L	T	PCT	W	L	T	PCT
Great Lakes Conference
East Division
Kalamazoo Xplosion-y	11	1	0	.917	5	1	0	.833
Muskegon Thunder-x	5	7	0	.417	2	2	0	.500
Fort Wayne Freedom	5	7	0	.417	2	4	0	.333
Miami Valley Silverbacks	3	9	0	.250	1	2	0	.333
West Division
Chicago Slaughter-y	8	4	0	.667	3	1	0	.750
Rock River Raptors-x	7	5	0	.583	3	1	0	.750
Milwaukee Bonecrushers	1	11	0	.083	0	4	0	.000
Atlantic Conference
East Division
New England Surge-y	8	3	0	.727	5	1	0	.833
Lehigh Valley Outlawz-x	7	5	0	.583	4	2	0	.667
New Jersey Revolution	3	9	0	.250	2	5	0	.286
Chesapeake Tide	2	10	0	.583	0	2	0	.000
West Division
Rochester Raiders-z	12	0	0	1.000	4	0	0	1.000
Saginaw Sting-y	10	2	0	.833	3	1	0	.750
Marion Mayhem-x	7	5	0	.583	0	2	0	.000
Flint Phantoms	1	11	0	.083	0	4	0	.000

Date	Opponent	Home/Away	Result
March 15	Miami Valley Silverbacks	Away	Lost 13–56
March 22	Lehigh Valley Outlawz	Away	Lost 32–54
April 4	Saginaw Sting	Away	Lost 24–48
April 12	Rochester Raiders	Away	Lost 3–49
April 19	Chesapeake Tide	Home	Won 49–47
April 26	Rochester Raiders	Home	Lost 16–59
May 3	Chesapeake Tide	Away	Lost 46–65
May 9	Milwaukee Bonecrushers	Home	Won 56–32
May 17	New England Surge	Away	Lost 26–62
May 24	New England Surge	Home	Lost 9–45
May 30	Lehigh Valley Outlawz	Home	Won 31–30
June 7	Chesapeake Tide	Home	Lost 48–55

=== 2009 season ===
Played an independent three-game season against other east coast based semi-professional teams.

Date	Opponent	Home/Away	Result
Unknown	East Penn Sting	Home	Won 23–68
Unknown	New York State Broncos	Home	Won 62–0
Unknown	Lebanon Valley Cardinals	Home	Won 69–24

=== 2010 season ===
Date	Opponent	Home/Away	Result
March 14	Baltimore Mariners	Away	Lost 23–68
March 20	Richmond Raiders	Away	Lost 38–51
March 27	Fayetteville Guard	Away	Lost 15–75
April 11	Baltimore Mariners	Home	Lost 27–61
April 17	Fayetteville Guard	Home	Lost 19–37
April 24	Harrisburg Stampede	Home	Lost 31–44
May 8	Reading Express	Home	Lost 69–71
May 14	Erie Storm	Away	Lost 38–40
May 22	Richmond Raiders	Home	Lost 40–76
May 29	Erie Storm	Home	Lost 58–68
June 5	Reading Express	Away	Lost 20–56
June 12	Harrisburg Stampede	Neutral site – Trenton, New Jersey	Lost 44–96
June 19	Baltimore Mariners	Away	Lost 6–84
June 26	Harrisburg Stampede	Away	Lost 29–80
