= 2008 Miami Valley Silverbacks season =

- Head coach: Carl Allen
- Home stadium: Hobart Arena

Results
- Record: 3-9
- Division place: 4th
- Playoffs: DNQ

The 2008 Miami Valley Silverbacks season was the third season for the Continental Indoor Football League (CIFL) franchise. In 2008, the team saw the only coach it had even known, removed himself from the position and become the team's president. His first move was to hire Carl Allen as his successor. The team finished 3-9 and had their third season in a row of declining win totals.

== Schedule ==
Date	Opponent	Home/Away	Result
March 15	New Jersey Revolution	Home	Won 56-13
March 21	Fort Wayne Freedom	Away	Lost 48-52
March 29	Saginaw Sting	Home	Lost 26-70
April 4	Chicago Slaughter	Away	Lost 38-57
April 12	New England Surge	Home	Lost 26-54
April 19	Marion Mayhem	Home	Lost 33-61
April 27	Milwaukee Bonecrushers	Away	Won 43-42
May 2	Fort Wayne Freedom	Home	Won 35-29
May 16	Kalamazoo Xplosion	Home	Lost 13-48
May 24	Lehigh Valley Outlawz	Away	Lost 27-29
May 31	Kalamazoo Xplosion	Away	Lost 43-46
June 7	Marion Mayhem	Away	Lost 44-51

== 2008 standings ==
2008 Continental Indoor Football League
Team	Overall				Division			
Team	W	L	T	PCT	W	L	T	PCT
Great Lakes Conference
East Division
Kalamazoo Xplosion-y	11	1	0	.917	5	1	0	.833
Muskegon Thunder-x	5	7	0	.417	2	2	0	.500
Fort Wayne Freedom	5	7	0	.417	2	4	0	.333
Miami Valley Silverbacks	3	9	0	.250	1	2	0	.333
West Division
Chicago Slaughter-y	8	4	0	.667	3	1	0	.750
Rock River Raptors-x	7	5	0	.583	3	1	0	.750
Milwaukee Bonecrushers	1	11	0	.083	0	4	0	.000
Atlantic Conference
East Division
New England Surge-y	8	3	0	.727	5	1	0	.833
Lehigh Valley Outlawz-x	7	5	0	.583	4	2	0	.667
New Jersey Revolution	3	9	0	.250	2	5	0	.286
Chesapeake Tide	2	10	0	.583	0	2	0	.000
West Division
Rochester Raiders-z	12	0	0	1.000	4	0	0	1.000
Saginaw Sting-y	10	2	0	.833	3	1	0	.750
Marion Mayhem-x	7	5	0	.583	0	2	0	.000
Flint Phantoms	1	11	0	.083	0	4	0	.000
