= Fort Wayne Freedom =

Logo

General information
- Founded: 2003
- Folded: 2009
- Headquartered: Allen County War Memorial Coliseum in Fort Wayne, Indiana
- Colors: Red, White, & Blue
- Mascot: Super Sam and Kooka Bird

Personnel
- Owner: 2003–2004 Rich Coffey
- General manager: Brad Harris The First Ladies
- Head coach: Rich Huff (2003–2004); Matt Land (2005, 2008–2009); Dan Pifer (2006); Willie Davis Jr. (2008)
- President: RICH Coffey

Team history
- Fort Wayne Freedom (2003–2006, 2008–2009)

Home fields
- Allen County War Memorial Coliseum (2004–2006, 2008–2009)

League / conference affiliations
- National Indoor Football League (2003–2004): Atlantic Conference (2003–2004); East Division (2003); North Division (2004); United Indoor Football (2005–2006): Midwestern Division (2005); Eastern Division (2006); Continental Indoor Football League (2008–2009): Great Lakes Conference (2008); East Division (2008–2009)

Championships
- Division championships: 2: UIF: 2005 CIFL: 2009

Playoff appearances (3)
- NIFL: 2004 UIF: 2005 CIFL: 2009

The Fort Wayne Freedom was a professional indoor football team based in Fort Wayne, Indiana.

The team was most recently a member of the Continental Indoor Football League, but originally began play in 2003 as an expansion team in the National Indoor Football League.

The Freedom were the original indoor football team to be based in Fort Wayne. After four years of being the only indoor team in Fort Wayne, the franchise was sold to AF2 and the Fort Wayne Fusion was established as part of the AF2 in 2007.

After a failed year in AF2, the Freedom came back in 2008 with new ownership and continued through the 2009 season. In 2010, another indoor team, the Fort Wayne FireHawks, replaced the Freedom in the CIFL.

The owner of the second version of the Freedom was Bill Fahlsing. The Freedom played their home games at Allen County War Memorial Coliseum in Fort Wayne.

== Franchise history ==
=== 2003 ===
==== Schedule ====
Date	Opponent	Result	Record
March 22, 2003	vs. Evansville BlueCats	W – 41–40	(1–0)
March 29, 2003	vs. Tupelo Fire Ants	W – 57–22	(2–0)
April 12, 2003	vs. Ohio Valley Greyhounds	L – 41–54	(2–1)
April 19, 2003	at Tennessee Riverhawks	L – 48–65	(2–2)
April 25, 2003	at Ohio Valley Greyhounds	L – 42–48	(2–3)
May 3, 2003	vs. Sioux Falls Storm	W – 55–19	(3–3)
May 17, 2003	vs. Myrtle Beach Stingrays	W – 51–25	(4–3)
May 24, 2003	at Evansville BlueCats	W – 62–33	(5–3)
May 30, 2003	at Lacrosse Night Train	W – 59–06	(6–3)
June 6, 2003	vs. Tennessee Riverhawks	W 74–15	(7–3)
June 14, 2003	at Sioux Falls Storm	L 49–52	(7–4)
June 21, 2003	at Myrtle Beach Stingrays	L – 41–50	(7–5)
June 26, 2003	at Lexington Horsemen	L – 43–59	(7–6)
July 5, 2003	vs. Lexington Horsemen	W – 76–62	(8–6)

=== 2004 ===
Original logo of the Freedom.

The original Fort Wayne Freedom was a professional indoor football team. They were most recently a member of the United Indoor Football league (UIF), and played their home games at the Allen County War Memorial Coliseum. In 2004, the Freedom set the single game record for attendance at 10,225.

==== Schedule ====
Date	Opponent	Result	Record
March 14, 2004	vs. Show-Me Believers	W – 66–37	(1–0)
March 20, 2004	vs. Evansville BlueCats	W – 80–41	(2–0)
April 3, 2004	at Lexington Horsemen	L – 21–49	(2–1)
April 10, 2004	vs. Lexington Horsemen	L – 48–51	(2–2)
April 24, 2004	vs. Atlantic City CardSharks	W – 63–54	(3–2)
May 1, 2004	at Evansville BlueCats	L – 68–71	(3–3)
May 8, 2004	vs. Ohio Valley Greyhounds	W – 43–35	(4–3)
May 15, 2004	at Staten Island Xtreme	L – 41–42	(4–4)
May 21, 2004	vs. Staten Island Xtreme	W – 56–07	(5–4)
May 28, 2004	at Show-Me Believers	W – 49–35	(6–4)
June 5, 2004	at Ohio Valley Greyhounds	L – 23–52	(6–5)
June 12, 2004	at Atlantic City CardSharks	L – 27–41	(6–6)
June 19, 2004	at Tupelo Fire Ants	W – 61–40	(7–6)
June 26, 2004	vs. Carolina Stingrays	W – 48–03#	(8–6)

# = set single game indoor football attendance record with 10,225 fans.

    - 2004 stats do not include a NIFL playoff games with the Show Me Believers and at Ohio Valley (Wheeling, West Virginia)***

=== 2005 ===
The 2005 season was the best season in franchise history. This was the first year in the UIF, the team moved to the association, after two years in the NIFL. Finishing a league-best 14–2, and winning the UIF Midwest Division. In the first-round of the UIF playoffs. The Tennessee Valley Raptors upset Freedom 57–22.

==== Schedule ====
Date	Opponent	Result	Record
March 20, 2005	vs. Ohio Valley Greyhounds	W 29–25	(1–0)
April 10, 2005	at Ohio Valley Greyhounds	W 31–20	(2–0)
April 16, 2005	vs. Black Hills Red Dogs	W – 59–34	(3–0)
April 23, 2005	at Tupelo Fire Ants	W – 51–15	(4–0)
April 30, 2005	at Sioux Falls Storm	W – 34–31	(5–0)
May 7, 2005	vs. Sioux City Bandits	W – 57–50	(6–0)
May 13, 2005	vs. Peoria Rough Riders	W – 52–32	(7–0)
May 21, 2005	at Peoria Rough Riders	W – 41–13	(8–0)
May 28, 2005	vs. Tupelo Fire Ants	W – 45–20	(9–0)
June 5, 2005	vs. Omaha Beef	W – 42–40	(10–0)
June 11, 2005	at Omaha Beef	L – 30–33	(10–1)
June 18, 2005	vs. Lexington Horsemen	L 41–58	(10–2)
June 25, 2005	at Peoria Rough Riders	W – 56–35	(11–2)
July 2, 2005	at Black Hills Red Dogs	W – 40–26	(12–2)
July 8, 2005	at Ohio Valley Greyhounds	W – 44–34	(13–2)
July 17, 2005	vs. Ohio Valley Greyhounds	W – 41–31	(14–2)

=== 2006 ===
As Matt Land left the Freedom to become head coach at Tri-State University in NCAA Division III. The Freedom selected offensive coordinator Dan Pifer to be their new head coach. Pifer would later serve as the offensive coordinator for NCAA Division III Tri-State, later renamed Trine, under former coach Matt Land. He had worked previously as an assistant coach at the University of St. Francis, an NAIA institution, and NCAA Division II Hillsdale College in Michigan. Pifer also was a high school assistant and played quarterback at the University of California in Pennsylvania. After completing its fourth year of football, the assets of the Freedom were sold to Jeremy Golden, who moved the franchise to AF2. Meanwhile, leaders with United Indoor Football did find an ownership group (that included investor Bill Bean) that also sought a lease with Randy Brown and the Memorial Coliseum. Brown opted to go with the AF2 franchise.

==== Rumored move to AF2 ====
The team had been heavily rumored to move to AF2 for quite some time, and Coffey sold the assets to Golden on November 10, 2006. Golden had already applied for and was awarded an AF2 franchise, but because only the assets and not the Freedom's corporate entity were sold, the Fort Wayne Fusion AF2 franchise is not a continuation of the UIF team.

==== Schedule ====
Date	Opponent	Result	Record
March 25, 2006	vs. Sioux City Bandits	W – 28–23	(1–0)
April 1, 2006	at Bloomington Extreme	W – 51–28	(2–0)
April 8, 2006	vs. Ohio Valley Greyhounds	W – 37–32	(3–0)
April 15, 2006	at Sioux City Bandits	L – 27–41	(3–1)
April 22, 2006	vs. Sioux Falls Storm	L – 44–47	(3–2)
April 28, 2006	at Lexington Horsemen	L – 65–32	(3–3)
May 6, 2006	at Sioux Falls Storm	L – 25–44	(3–4)
May 12, 2006	vs. Rock River Raptors	L – 36–49	(3–5)
May 20, 2006	vs. Evansville BlueCats	L – 31–33	(3–6)
June 3, 2006	at Ohio Valley Greyhounds	L – 29–52	(3–7)
June 10, 2006	at Evansville BlueCats	L – 37–43	(3–8)
June 17, 2006	at Rock River Raptors	L – 27–29	(3–9)
June 24, 2006	vs. Ohio Valley Greyhounds	W – 42–40	(4–9)
July 1, 2006	vs. Lexington Horsemen	L – 44–70	(4–10)
July 8, 2006	at Omaha Beef	L – 13–52	(4–11)

=== 2008: The return of the Freedom ===
In October 2007, the group Fort Wayne Sports Partners owned by Todd Ellis, John Christener and Mike McCaffrey, adopted the name Freedom as a new franchise in 2008. Only the name, and some players from the 2003–2006 teams were associated with the original franchise. . The team also announced that Eddie Brown, who had coached the Fusion the season before, would be the head coach for the Freedom, who would be joining the Continental Indoor Football League. Since the Fusion ownership had failed mid season in 2007, Brown and McCaffrey made majority owner Todd Ellis guaranteed them both that if the team ran into financial trouble they would not be responsible for any of the unpaid bills. The teams poor financial history left every part of owning the franchise more difficult, even as far as ownership of the team's turf. The team's new ownership also showed signs of financial trouble right away, as they were banned from the CIFL in January 2008, for failing to pay league dues. These troubles made Brown and McCaffrey question the ownership, and Ellis fired them both, replacing Brown with Willie Davis Jr. and McCaffrey with himself. The Freedom were able to work out a deal with CIFL Commissioner, Jeff Spitaleri, and paid their $22,500 league fee, which removed the ban and allowed the team to join the CIFL in 2008.

==== Schedule ====
Date	Opponent	Home/Away	Result
March 21	Miami Valley Silverbacks	Home	Won 52–48
March 27	Kalamazoo Xplosion	Home	Lost 34–50
April 4	Rock River Raptors	Away	Lost 29–64
April 12	Muskegon Thunder	Away	Lost 33–39
April 19	Rock River Raptors	Home	Won 55–54
April 26	Marion Mayhem	Home	Won 55–40
May 2	Miami Valley Silverbacks	Away	Lost 29–35
May 10	Saginaw Sting	Home	Lost 21–34
May 17	Chicago Slaughter	Away	Lost 33–41
May 24	Muskegon Thunder	Home	Won 42–38
May 31	Chesapeake Tide	Away	Won 37–31
June 7	Kalamazoo Xplosion	Away	Lost 32–39

==== Standings ====
2008 Continental Indoor Football League
Team	Overall				Division			
Team	W	L	T	PCT	W	L	T	PCT
Great Lakes Conference
East Division
Kalamazoo Xplosion-y	11	1	0	.917	5	1	0	.833
Muskegon Thunder-x	5	7	0	.417	2	2	0	.500
Fort Wayne Freedom	5	7	0	.417	2	4	0	.333
Miami Valley Silverbacks	3	9	0	.250	1	2	0	.333
West Division
Chicago Slaughter-y	8	4	0	.667	3	1	0	.750
Rock River Raptors-x	7	5	0	.583	3	1	0	.750
Milwaukee Bonecrushers	1	11	0	.083	0	4	0	.000
Atlantic Conference
East Division
New England Surge-y	8	3	0	.727	5	1	0	.833
Lehigh Valley Outlawz-x	7	5	0	.583	4	2	0	.667
New Jersey Revolution	3	9	0	.250	2	5	0	.286
Chesapeake Tide	2	10	0	.583	0	2	0	.000
West Division
Rochester Raiders-z	12	0	0	1.000	4	0	0	1.000
Saginaw Sting-y	10	2	0	.833	3	1	0	.750
Marion Mayhem-x	7	5	0	.583	0	2	0	.000
Flint Phantoms	1	11	0	.083	0	4	0	.000

=== 2009 ===
In September, 2008, the Freedom announced that former Freedom Assistant GM Brad Harris (who was with the original Freedom from 2003 to 2005) had been hired as GM. Head coach Matt Land also returned for the 2009 to coach the team for the full season.

In 2008, Land, who had been the team's head coach for the 2005 campaign, was asked by team co-owner William Fahlsing to lead the team for the final four games of the season when original head coach Willie Davis Jr. was fired the morning of the May 17 game against the Chicago Slaughter. With only 15 minutes of practice, Land's second term began with a 41–33 loss to the Slaughter, despite a solid performance by the Freedom defense.

In 2009, the Freedom had success on the field but struggled financially. Toward the end of the 2009 season players were not paid promptly and then not at all. Team Co-owners Bill Fahlsing and Mark Chappius were forced to ask for public support to help get the team through the season. Despite the financial issue with salaries, the players continued to play for the Freedom and won the Eastern Conference Championship over the Marion Mayhem but lost the 2009 CIFL championship game to the Chicago Slaughter.

==== Schedule ====
Date	Opponent	Home/Away	Result
March 21	Marion Mayhem	Home	Win 46–23
March 28	Wheeling Wildcats	Away	Win 49–34
April 4	Marion Mayhem	Away	Loss 39–33 OT
April 10	Wisconsin Wolfpack	Away	Loss 38–34
April 18	Chicago Slaughter	Home	Loss 56–41
April 25	Miami Valley Silverbacks	Home	Win 33–28
May 1	Rock River Raptors	Home	Loss 48–46
May 9	Milwaukee Bonecrushers	Away	Win 51–33
May 16	Miami Valley Silverbacks	Away	Win 56–28
May 23	Marion Mayhem	Home	Loss 62–47
May 29	Wheeling Wildcats	Away	Won 84–42
June 6	Miami Valley Silverbacks	Game was canceled	
June 20	CIFL EASTERN DIVISION PLAYOFF	Marion Mayhem	Away Won 49–40
June 27	CIFL CHAMPIONSHIP	Chicago Slaughter	Away Lost 58–48

==== Standings ====
2009 Continental Indoor Football League
Team	Overall				Division			
Team	W	L	T	PCT	W	L	T	PCT
East Division
Marion Mayhem-y	9	3	0	.750	8	1	0	.889
Fort Wayne Freedom-x	6	5	0	.545	5	2	0	.294
Wheeling Wildcats	2	10	0	.167	2	5	0	.286
Miami Valley Silverbacks	0	10	0	.000	0	7	0	.000
West Division
Chicago Slaughter-y	12	0	0	1.000	8	0	0	1.000
Wisconsin Wolfpack-x	7	5	0	.583	4	4	0	.500
Rock River Raptors	7	5	0	.583	3	5	0	.167
Milwaukee Bonecrushers	3	8	0	.273	1	7	0	.167

== Fans ==
The Freedom Force was the official fan club of the Fort Wayne Freedom.

== Head coaches ==
Name	Term	Regular season				Playoffs		Awards
Name	Term	W	L	T	Win%	W	L	Awards
Rich Huff	2003–2004	16	12	0	.571	1	1	
Matt Land	2005, 2008–2009	25	14	0	.641	1	2	
Dan Pifer	2006	4	11	0	.267	0	0	
Willie Davis Jr.	2008	3	5	0	.375	0	0	

== Season-by-season results ==
League champions	Conference champions	Division champions	Wild card berth	League leader

Season	Team	League	Conference	Division	Regular season				Postseason results
Season	Team	League	Conference	Division	Finish	Wins	Losses	Ties	Postseason results
2003	2003	NIFL	Atlantic	East	3rd	8	6	0	
2004	2004	NIFL	Atlantic	North	2nd	8	6	0	Won Atlantic Conference 1st Round (Believers) 45–28; Lost Atlantic Conference Quarterfinals (Greyhounds) 35–36
2005	2005	UIF		Midwestern	1st	14	2	0	Lost UIF Quarterfinals (Raptors) 22–57
2006	2006	UIF		Eastern	4th	4	11	0	
2008	2008	CIFL	Great Lakes	East	3rd	5	7	0	
2009	2009	CIFL		East	2nd	6	5	0	Won Eastern Finals (Mayhem) 49–40; Lost CIFL Championship Game (Slaughter) 48–58
Totals						45	37	0	All-time regular season record (2003–2009)
Totals						2	3	-	All-time postseason record (2003–2009)
Totals						47	40	0	All-time regular season and postseason record (2003–2009)

== See also ==
- History of sports in Fort Wayne, Indiana
