= New England Surge =

Logo

General information
- Founded: 2007
- Folded: 2008
- Headquartered: DCU Center in Worcester, Massachusetts
- Colors: Red, Gold, White
- Mascot: Surgeo the Leopard

Personnel
- Head coach: Rick Buffington (2007); Roy Lucas Jr. (2007–2008)
- President: Roy Lucas Jr.

Team history
- New England Surge (2007–2008)

Home fields
- DCU Center (2007–2008)

League / conference affiliations
- Continental Indoor Football League (2007–2008): Atlantic Conference (2007–2008); East Division (2008)

Championships
- Division championships: 1: 2008

Playoff appearances (2)
- 2007, 2008

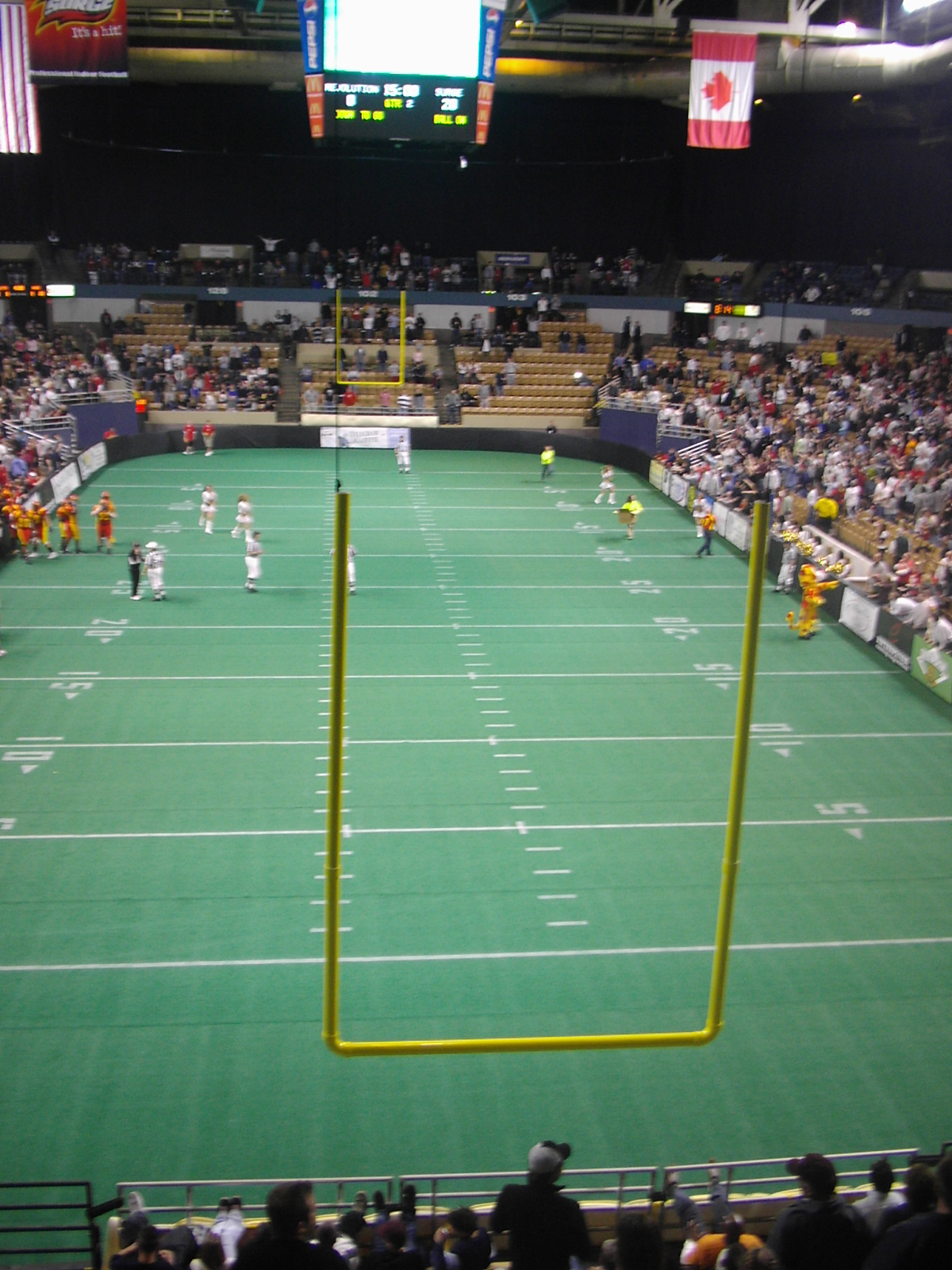
View of DCU Center during initial home game on April 14, 2007

The New England Surge were an indoor football team that was a member of the Continental Indoor Football League in 2007 and 2008.

The Surge played home games at the DCU Center in downtown Worcester, Massachusetts. On April 24, 2007, only four games into the team's first season, head coach Rick Buffington was fired, replaced by team president Roy Lucas Jr.

The team shut down its operations after the 2008 season. The mascot's name was Surgeo the Leopard.

== Season-by-season ==
Season records
Season	W	L	T	Finish	Playoff results
2007	8	4	0	2nd Atlantic	Won AD Semifinal (Lehigh Valley); Lost AD Championship (Rochester)
2008	8	3	0	1st Atlantic East	Lost AD East Finals (Lehigh Valley)
Totals	17	9	0	(including playoffs)	

== 2007 season ==
The Surge started their inaugural season by losing their first two games before Defeating New York/New Jersey by a score of 61–6 in front of a home crowd of 4,724 fans. However, following a 1–3 start, team owner Roy Lucas Jr. fired Rick Buffington and named himself as a coach. The team would dramatically improve under Lucas winning 7 of their final 8 games en route to a #2 seed in the playoffs. The Surge would defeat the Lehigh Valley Outlawz 58–34 in the Atlantic Division Semifinal game before losing 80–45 to the Rochester Raiders in the Championship game.

Notable players

- Harold Shaw, former New England Patriots running back
- Tyler Grogan, son of former New England Patriots quarterback Steve Grogan
- Marc Eddy
- Derek Stephens, Born in Worcester, he played 3 years at Linebacker for the Detroit Lions of the NFL

=== 2007 CIFL standings ===
2007 Continental Indoor Football League
Team	Overall				Division			
Team	W	L	T	PCT	W	L	T	PCT
Great Lakes Conference
Michigan Pirates-y	12	0	0	1.000	10	0	0	1.000
Kalamazoo Xplosion-x	10	2	0	.833	10	2	0	.833
Chicago Slaughter-x	9	3	0	.750	8	2	0	.800
Marion Mayhem-x	6	6	0	.500	6	5	0	.545
Muskegon Thunder-x	4	8	0	.333	4	7	0	.364
Miami Valley Silverbacks	4	8	0	.333	3	7	0	.300
Summit County Rumble	1	11	0	.083	0	7	0	.000
Springfield Stallions	0	12	0	.000	0	11	0	.000
Atlantic Conference
Rochester Raiders-y	10	2	0	.833	90	0	0	1.000
New England Surge-x	8	4	0	.667	8	3	0	.727
Lehigh Valley Outlawz-x	7	5	0	.583	5	5	0	.500
Chesapeake Tide-x	7	5	0	.583	6	5	0	.545
Steubenville Stampede	5	7	0	.417	2	6	0	.250
NY/NJ Revolution	1	11	0	.083	0	11	0	.000

== 2008 season ==
The Surge would start the 2008 season with a 5–0 record, highlighted by a dramatic 49–41 victory over the Chesapeake Tide and a ferocious rally to defeat the Flint Phantoms 49–48, before losing a 62–20 game against Rochester. They would finish the season with an 8–3 record and won the Atlantic Division East regular-season title. They would go into the playoffs as the #1 seed. On the eve of their semifinal playoff matchup with the Lehigh Valley Outlawz, Offensive coordinator Jerry Snay abruptly resigned from the team, stating that he had not been paid in two years. The Surge would go on to lose the game by a score of 27–21. This would end up being the last game played by the Surge.

=== 2008 CIFL standings ===
2008 Continental Indoor Football League
Team	Overall				Division			
Team	W	L	T	PCT	W	L	T	PCT
Great Lakes Conference
East Division
Kalamazoo Xplosion-y	11	1	0	.917	5	1	0	.833
Muskegon Thunder-x	5	7	0	.417	2	2	0	.500
Fort Wayne Freedom	5	7	0	.417	2	4	0	.333
Miami Valley Silverbacks	3	9	0	.250	1	2	0	.333
West Division
Chicago Slaughter-y	8	4	0	.667	3	1	0	.750
Rock River Raptors-x	7	5	0	.583	3	1	0	.750
Milwaukee Bonecrushers	1	11	0	.083	0	4	0	.000
Atlantic Conference
East Division
New England Surge-y	8	3	0	.727	5	1	0	.833
Lehigh Valley Outlawz-x	7	5	0	.583	4	2	0	.667
New Jersey Revolution	3	9	0	.250	2	5	0	.286
Chesapeake Tide	2	10	0	.583	0	2	0	.000
West Division
Rochester Raiders-z	12	0	0	1.000	4	0	0	1.000
Saginaw Sting-y	10	2	0	.833	3	1	0	.750
Marion Mayhem-x	7	5	0	.583	0	2	0	.000
Flint Phantoms	1	11	0	.083	0	4	0	.000

== Team demise ==
After only two years in existence as a franchise, the team investors stated that the Surge had lost a total of about $577,000. Still, on January 29, 2009, Lucas told the Worcester Telegram and Gazette, "we can guarantee there will be indoor football in Worcester in 2009." Shortly thereafter the investors voted 5–1 to remove Lucas as president. The same investors, mostly small business owners and retirees who borrowed some of the money they put up and had no experience in professional sports, allege that Mr. Lucas buried the team with sloppy bookkeeping, poor business practices, and out-of-control spending on hotel rooms, restaurant tabs, rental cars, airline tickets, and marketing expenses. The Surge announced that they would be leaving the CIFL and would be starting a new league (the United States Indoor Football League) along with the Lehigh Valley Outlawz. Three other teams were announced but despite promises, the league never produced a schedule and is presumed defunct.

Reasons cited for the huge losses include the $40,000 plus tab the team ran up the first season with the Hilton Garden Inn hotel to house players, as well as money for plane tickets. Several out-of-state players were brought in and housed in the hotel rather than the Surge using local talent. Others cite that Lucas took on too many duties when he named himself the team’s coach and tried to handle on-field duties and the general manager’s job at the same time. Last, the Surge spent a large amount of $107,000 in advertising costs in its first season. On April 3, 2009, Lucas notified The DCU Center that it would be voiding the third and final year on its lease with the Arena. Several court cases have been filed as investors, creditors, as well as players and coaches, have all attempted to recover money owed to them.
