= List of CIFL seasons =

This is a list of Continental Indoor Football League seasons since the league started in 2006. The 2014 season is the ninth season for the league.

2006 | 2007 | 2008 | 2009 | 2010 | 2011 | 2012 | 2013 | 2014
