= Lehigh Valley Outlawz =

Logo

General information
- Founded: 2006
- Folded: 2008
- Headquartered: Stabler Arena in Bethlehem, Pennsylvania
- Colors: Red, black, white
- Mascot: OutKast

Personnel
- Owner: Jim DePaul
- General manager: Jim DePaul
- Head coach: Mike DePaul
- President: Jim DePaul

Team history
- Philly Outlawz (2004–2005); Lehigh Valley Outlawz (2006–2008)

Home fields
- Stabler Arena (2006–2008)

League / conference affiliations
- Labelle Community Football League (2004–2005) Great Lakes/Continental Indoor Football League (2006–2008): Atlantic Division (2007); Atlantic Conference (2008); East Division (2008)

Playoff appearances (3)
- 2006, 2007, 2008

The Lehigh Valley Outlawz were a professional indoor football team based in Bethlehem, Pennsylvania. The team began play as a semi-pro team in the Labelle Community Football League as the Philly Outlawz. The team was later a charter member of the Great Lakes Indoor Football League joining the league in 2006 as an expansion team. The Outlawz and the Reading Express were the first professional indoor football team to be based in Lehigh Valley. The Outlawz were owned by Jim DePaul. They played their home games at the Stabler Arena on the campus of Lehigh University in Bethlehem, Pennsylvania.

== Franchise history ==
=== 2004–2005 ===
Prior to joining indoor football, they were a semi-pro team from the Labelle Community Football League known as the Philly Outlawz. They played in the league from 2004 to 2005.

=== 2006: Turning pro ===
In 2006, the Outlawz made the jump to professional status when they joined the Great Lakes Indoor Football League. During their inaugural year, the Outlawz hosted the first, and only, GLIFL All-Star Game. They ended their regular season at 5-5 which was good enough to clinch the number 3 playoff spot. In the playoffs, they were eliminated by the second-seeded Rochester Raiders in the semifinals.

==== Standings ====
2006 Great Lakes Indoor Football League
Team	W	L	T	PCT
Port Huron Pirates-y	10	0	0	1.000
Rochester Raiders-x	7	3	0	.700
Lehigh Valley Outlawz-x	5	5	0	.500
Battle Creek Crunch-x	4	6	0	.400
Marion Mayhem	4	6	0	.400
New York/New Jersey Revolution	0	10	0	.000

=== 2007 ===
In 2007, the Outlawz would finish the season with a 7-5 record which, would again earn them the number 3 seed in the Atlantic Division playoffs. They went on to lose in the semifinal round of the playoffs to the New England Surge.

==== Schedule ====
Date	Opponent	Home/Away	Result
April 7	NY/NJ Revolution	Home	Won 45-25
April 14	Rochester Raiders	Home	Lost 25-63
April 21	NY/NJ Revolution	Away	Won 46-29
April 28	Steubenville Stampede	Home	Won 64-57
May 5	Chesapeake Tide	Away	Lost 56-57 (OT)
May 12	New England Surge	Away	Lost 25-53
May 19	Marion Mayhem	Home	Won 48-25
May 26	Rochester Raiders	Away	Lost 49-77
June 2	New England Surge	Home	Lost 42-70
June 9	Chesapeake Tide	Home	Won 48-26
June 16	Steubenville Stampede	Away	Won 54-20
June 23	Muskegon Thunder	Away	Won 55-54
July 7	New England Surge (Playoffs)	Away	Lost 34-58

==== Standings ====
2007 Continental Indoor Football League
Team	Overall				Division			
Team	W	L	T	PCT	W	L	T	PCT
Great Lakes Conference
Michigan Pirates-y	12	0	0	1.000	10	0	0	1.000
Kalamazoo Xplosion-x	10	2	0	.833	10	2	0	.833
Chicago Slaughter-x	9	3	0	.750	8	2	0	.800
Marion Mayhem-x	6	6	0	.500	6	5	0	.545
Muskegon Thunder-x	4	8	0	.333	4	7	0	.364
Miami Valley Silverbacks	4	8	0	.333	3	7	0	.300
Summit County Rumble	1	11	0	.083	0	7	0	.000
Springfield Stallions	0	12	0	.000	0	11	0	.000
Atlantic Conference
Rochester Raiders-y	10	2	0	.833	90	0	0	1.000
New England Surge-x	8	4	0	.667	8	3	0	.727
Lehigh Valley Outlawz-x	7	5	0	.583	5	5	0	.500
Chesapeake Tide-x	7	5	0	.583	6	5	0	.545
Steubenville Stampede	5	7	0	.417	2	6	0	.250
NY/NJ Revolution	1	11	0	.083	0	11	0	.000

=== 2008 ===
The Outlawz would finish the 2008 regular season with a 6-5 record and the #2 seed in the Atlantic Division East. The team would take a big step in winning their first playoff game against the New England Surge before being defeated by the Saginaw Sting in the Atlantic Division Championship.

==== Schedule ====
Date	Opponent	Home/Away	Result
March 22	New Jersey Revolution	Home	Won 54-32
March 29	Rochester Raiders	Away	Lost 27-49
April 12	Chesapeake Tide	Home	Won 62-28
April 20	New England Surge	Away	Lost 14-35
April 27	Chesapeake Tide	Away	Won 50-17
May 3	Marion Mayhem	Home	Won 44-33
May 10	Rochester Raiders	Home	Lost 26-45
May 16	Marion Mayhem	Away	Lost 23-36
May 24	Miami Valley Silverbacks	Home	Won 29-27
May 30	New Jersey Revolution	Away	Lost 30-31
June 7	New England Surge	Away	Won 45-42
June 14	New England Surge (Playoffs)	Home	Won 27-21
June 23	Saginaw Sting (Playoffs)	Away	Lost 25-59

==== Standings ====
2008 Continental Indoor Football League
Team	Overall				Division			
Team	W	L	T	PCT	W	L	T	PCT
Great Lakes Conference
East Division
Kalamazoo Xplosion-y	11	1	0	.917	5	1	0	.833
Muskegon Thunder-x	5	7	0	.417	2	2	0	.500
Fort Wayne Freedom	5	7	0	.417	2	4	0	.333
Miami Valley Silverbacks	3	9	0	.250	1	2	0	.333
West Division
Chicago Slaughter-y	8	4	0	.667	3	1	0	.750
Rock River Raptors-x	7	5	0	.583	3	1	0	.750
Milwaukee Bonecrushers	1	11	0	.083	0	4	0	.000
Atlantic Conference
East Division
New England Surge-y	8	3	0	.727	5	1	0	.833
Lehigh Valley Outlawz-x	7	5	0	.583	4	2	0	.667
New Jersey Revolution	3	9	0	.250	2	5	0	.286
Chesapeake Tide	2	10	0	.583	0	2	0	.000
West Division
Rochester Raiders-z	12	0	0	1.000	4	0	0	1.000
Saginaw Sting-y	10	2	0	.833	3	1	0	.750
Marion Mayhem-x	7	5	0	.583	0	2	0	.000
Flint Phantoms	1	11	0	.083	0	4	0	.000

=== Demise ===
After the 2008 season the Outlawz, along with the New England Surge left the CIFL and planned to start their own league, the United States Indoor Football League. Later three more teams, the Southland (IL) Chill, the Bridgeview Red Devils, and the Pennsylvania Stillers were announced as participants in the newly formed league. The team had stated that the season would start in March, around the same time that its previous seasons had begun. However, the start was then pushed back to April, then May and a final announcement was made that the 2009 schedule would be out June 1. The schedule never came out and the team and league website stopped being updated. The team shut down their Hellertown, Pennsylvania headquarters. The league website stated that it (the USIFL) was based out of Cape Coral, Florida, however, the USIFL decided it was best to not try and start a new league venture with the US economy in its current condition. Rumors of unpaid player and accounts were never confirmed and a lawsuit brought by a former coach was dismissed without merit.

== Season-by-season ==
Season records
Season	W	L	T	Finish	Playoff results
Philly Outlawz (LCFL)
2004	9	4	0	2nd D Division	Lost Round 1 (Claymont)
2005	9	1	1	1st League	Won Round 1 (Eastwick); Won Semifinal (Claymont); Lost LaBelle Bowl II (Frankford)
Lehigh Valley Outlawz (GLIFL)
2006	5	5	0	3rd League	Lost Semifinals (Rochester)
Lehigh Valley Outlawz (CIFL)
2007	7	5	0	3rd Atlantic	Lost AD Semifinal (New England)
2008	6	5	0	2nd Atlantic East	Won AD East Finals (New England); Lost AD Championship (Saginaw)
Lehigh Valley Outlawz (USIFL)
2009	--	--	--	--	--
Totals	37	21	1	(including LCFL, GLIFL, and CIFL playoffs)	
