= Lehi =

Lehi may refer to:

== Places ==
- Lehi (Bible), a location in Judea
- Lehi, Arizona, a community
- Lehi, Mesa, a community in Mesa, Arizona
- Lehi, Arkansas, a community
- Lehi, Utah, a city
- Lehi (UTA station), in Utah, for commuter rail

== Other ==
- Lehi (militant group), Zionist paramilitary organization in British Mandate of Palestine

== People in Book of Mormon ==
- Lehi (prophet), 7th–6th cen. BC
- Lehi (commander), Nephite military commander; see List of Book of Mormon people § L
- Lehi (son of Zoram), see List of Book of Mormon people § L

== See also ==
- Lahi (disambiguation)
- Lehigh (disambiguation)
