= Stanley Jackson (gridiron football) =

American gridiron football player (born 1975)

No. 8,1
- Position: Quarterback

Personal information
- Born: March 24, 1975 (age 51); Paterson, New Jersey, U.S.

Career information
- High school: Paterson Catholic
- College: Ohio State
- NFL draft: 1997: undrafted

Career history

Playing
- Seattle Seahawks* (1997); Chicago Bears (1999–2000); Toronto Argonauts (2001–2002); Winnipeg Blue Bombers (2004); Marion Mayhem (2007–2009)
- * Offseason or practice squad member only

Coaching
- Co-Owner Marion Mayhem (2007–2009)

Career CFL statistics
- Completions: 68
- Attempts: 124
- Passing yards: 900
- Touchdowns: 3
- Interceptions: 6

Stanley Jackson (born March 24, 1975) is an American former football quarterback who played in the Canadian Football League (CFL) and Continental Indoor Football League (CIFL). He was also the co-owner of the CIFL's Marion Mayhem.

== College career ==
Jackson played college football for the Ohio State Buckeyes, where he alternated with Joe Germaine at the quarterback position. He was part of the 1996 team that won the 1997 Rose Bowl.

== Professional career ==
=== Montreal Alouettes ===
In 1999 and 2000, Jackson played quarterback for the Montreal Alouettes in the CFL. In two seasons, Jackson completed 50 of 90 passes for 679 yards with one touchdown and three interceptions.

During his time as a football player, Stanley Jackson would periodically work as a staff member at The Lords Ranch in Warm Springs, Arkansas.

=== Toronto Argonauts ===
In 2001 and 2002, Jackson had moved on to the Toronto Argonauts. He saw significantly less playing time, completing 14 of only 22 attempts for 2 touchdowns and 3 interceptions.

=== Winnipeg Blue Bombers ===
After sitting out all of 2003 with a knee injury, Winnipeg Blue Bombers gave Jackson a chance to play quarterback again in 2004. He completed only 4 passes on 12 attempts for 67 yards.

=== Marion Mayhem ===
After retiring for two years, Jackson played for the Marion Mayhem of the newly formed, Continental Indoor Football League. Citing that he missed the game after sitting out, Jackson tried out and made the Mayhem squad. He was also part owner in the low budget league. He went on to have 3 successful seasons with the Mayhem, guiding them to 6-6, 7-5, and 9-3 records. He owns two CIFL records, passing completions in a season (177) and passing attempts in a season (348).

== Post-retirement ==
Jackson is currently a color analyst for college football games on the Big Ten Network. He has also served as an analyst for the Ohio State Buckeyes' pre-game and post-game show on WTVN radio in Columbus, Ohio. He is married to Ronita "Myricks" Jackson, has 4 children and currently lives in Westerville, Ohio. Jackson has also been appointed by Ohio Governor John Kasich to the Ohio State Board of Education, an action which has created some controversy in Ohio among some educators who have voiced doubt that Jackson has the appropriate credentials for the position. In February 2023 Jackson was named as the head football coach at Westerville North High School.
