= Matt Land =

American football coach and athletic director

Current position
- Title: Athletic director
- Team: Trine
- Conference: MIAA

Biographical details
- Born: February 10, 1972 (age 54)
- Education: Ball State University (1996)

Coaching career (HC unless noted)
- 2002–2005: South Side HS (IN)
- 2005, 2008–2009: Fort Wayne Freedom
- 2006–2014: Tri-State / Trine

Administrative career (AD unless noted)
- 2012–present: Trine

Head coaching record
- Overall: 63–32 (college); 28–20 (high school); 23–11 (indoor football)
- Tournaments: 2–3 (NCAA D-III playoffs)

Accomplishments and honors

Championships
- 3 MIAA (2008–2010)

Matt Land (born February 10, 1972) is the athletic director and former head football coach for Trine University. 2006 was his first season as the program's head coach. The team finished 2–8. In 2007, they finished with a record of 6–4. In 2008 he was awarded the NCAA Division III Co-Region Four Coach of the Year award after leading Trine to a 10–0 regular season. In April 2012, Land was named the athletic director at Trine.

Land was also the head coach for the United Indoor Football league's Fort Wayne Freedom in 2005, and Fort Wayne's South Side High School from 2002 to 2005, each year he built up the team a little bit more until his last year in 2005 when he coached the team to its winningest season ever, including a sectional championship victory over Bishop Dwenger High School, a Class 4A regional victory over Delta High School. The Archers lost in the semi-state to Lowell, the eventual Class 4A state champs. He was also the wrestling coach for Northrop High School. Land was part of a rebuilding process at South Side High School, in which he built a team that was 7–20 in three years prior to his arrival, and a 21–11 record in the following three seasons.

== Head coaching record ==
=== College ===
Year	Team	Overall	Conference	Standing	Bowl/playoffs
Tri–State/Trine Thunder (Michigan Intercollegiate Athletic Association) (2006–2014)
2006	Tri-State	2–8	2–5	T–6th	
2007	Tri-State	6–4	4–3	T–4th	
2008	Trine	10–1	6–0	1st	L NCAA Division III First Round
2009	Trine	10–2	6–0	1st	L NCAA Division III Second Round
2010	Trine	11–1	6–0	1st	L NCAA Division III Second Round
2011	Trine	7–3	3–3	4th	
2012	Trine	7–3	5–1	2nd	
2013	Trine	4–6	1–5	T–5th	
2014	Trine	6–4	4–2	T–2nd	
Tri-State/Trine:		63–32	2–12		
Total:		63–32			
National championship Conference title Conference division title or championship game berth
