= Gilbert Brown =

American football player and coach (born 1971)

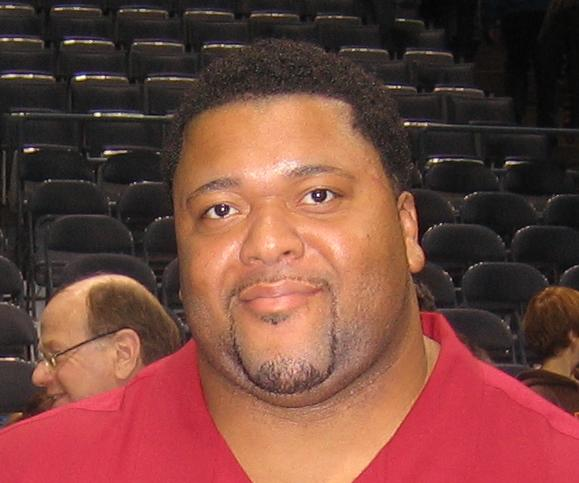
- Brown in 2005.

No. 71, 93
- Position: Nose tackle

Personal information
- Born: February 22, 1971 (age 55); Farmington, Michigan, U.S.
- Listed height: 6 ft 2 in (1.88 m)
- Listed weight: 340 lb (154 kg)

Career information
- High school: Mackenzie (Detroit, Michigan)
- College: Kansas
- NFL draft: 1993: 3rd round, 79th overall pick

Career history

Playing
- Minnesota Vikings (1993)*; Green Bay Packers (1993–2003)
- * Offseason or practice squad member only

Coaching
- Milwaukee Bonecrushers (2008) (Head Coach); La Crosse Spartans (2010–2011) (Head Coach); Green Bay Chill (2011–2013) (Head Coach)

Awards and highlights
- Super Bowl champion (XXXI); Green Bay Packers Hall of Fame; Second-team All-Big Eight (1990)

Career NFL statistics
- Tackles: 292
- Sacks: 7.0
- Fumble recoveries: 1
- Stats at Pro Football Reference

Gilbert Jesse Brown (born February 22, 1971) is an American former professional football player who was a nose tackle for the Green Bay Packers of the National Football League (NFL) from 1993 to 2003. Brown played in 125 Packers games (103 starts), recording 292 tackles (186 solo) and seven sacks. Nicknamed "The Gravedigger" in honor of his celebratory dance following a thunderous tackle, Brown played in 15 Packers playoff games. He was a major contributor on strong defenses during the mid-1990s. His most successful season was in 1996, when he started all 16 games and Green Bay won Super Bowl XXXI. He played college football for the Kansas Jayhawks, who won the 1992 Aloha Bowl. He was selected for the All-Academic Big Eight team in 1991.

== Early life ==
Brown grew up in Detroit, Michigan with parents Leroy and Ann Brown, older brother Leroy, and younger siblings, Carla, Carlos and JoAnn (all of whom went to college and became athletes).

During his career at Mackenzie High School, Brown recorded 189 tackles and 19 sacks. His senior year culminated in all-state honors. He also lettered in track, competing in the shot put. He graduated from high school in 1989.

== College career ==
Brown chose to attend the University of Kansas, and majored in human development. With the Jayhawks, Brown helped build a winning program, along with Dana Stubblefield. He started all but 2 games in four seasons at the University of Kansas (1989–92), and was tied for sixth in school history in tackles by a defensive lineman with 168, fifth in career tackles for loss with 30, and had 7 1/2 career sacks. He finished second on the team in sacks, tackles for loss and fumbles recovered in 1991 while helping the Jayhawks hold opponents to an average of 150.9 yards per game on the ground, which was the best run defense at Kansas since 1968 at the time. A year earlier, as a sophomore, was named as the Jayhawks' 'Co-Defensive Most Valuable Player' and earned second-team All-Big Eight Conference recognition. Brown started nine games at nose guard as a freshman...An All-Academic Big Eight selection in 1991.

He came up with the "Gravedigger" move at Kansas—after a big defensive hit, he would dig an imaginary grave, which became his trademark and nickname.

== Professional career ==
Pre-draft measurables
| Height | Weight | Arm length | Hand span | 40-yard dash | 10-yard split | 20-yard split | 20-yard shuttle | Vertical jump | Broad jump | Bench press |
|---|---|---|---|---|---|---|---|---|---|---|
| 6 ft 2 3/4 in (1.90 m) | 330 lb (150 kg) | 32 3/4 in (0.83 m) | 9 3/8 in (0.24 m) | 5.12 s | 1.83 s | 3.02 s | 4.84 s | 23 in (0.58 m) | 8 ft 8 in (2.64 m) | 24 reps |
All values from NFL Combine

Brown was selected by the Minnesota Vikings in the third round of the 1993 NFL draft (79th overall pick), but was waived during the final roster cutdowns on August 30, 1993, in his first training camp due to his weight. He was listed at 315 in college, but showed up to Vikings camp at a hefty 355. But the Packers, desperate then for defensive linemen, picked him up on August 31. Brown played in just two games that season while he worked off some of his weight in practice. In 1994, he played but his season was cut short with a torn Anterior cruciate ligament. Again in 1995, he played, but an elbow injury cut that season short. In 1996, he started all 16 games next to Santana Dotson, Sean Jones and Reggie White, a defensive unit that allowed a league record low 19 touchdowns. Brown had a career-high 51 tackles, and his first complete 16-game season. Brown became a fan favorite, partly because of his eccentric gravedigger dance, and partly because of the "Gilbertburger" — a Double Whopper with extra everything, cut in half with extra cheese, no pickles — always obtained from the Oneida Street Burger King in Green Bay. Burger King even made it available for a short time as a promotion in Wisconsin Burger King restaurants.

Brown was a highly sought after free agent after the 1996 season, but he elected to take a pay cut to stay with the Packers. On February 18, 1997, he signed a three-year, $8.25 million contract, which was 10 times his 1996 salary, but was about $1 million less than the offer he received from Jacksonville. Despite his weight, he posted three sacks during the 1997 season, which tied his career high from 1994.

After playing all 16 games during the 1998 and 1999 seasons, he spent the 2000 season out of football after his contract with the Packers was not renewed. Before the 2001 training camp, he worked out and lived for a time with Fred Roll, his former strength and conditioning coach at the University of Kansas, and subsequently returned to Green Bay for training camp in July at 339 pounds.

Brown had two good years after his return to football. However, he ruptured a biceps during the 2003 pre-season, but played on without having surgery. He recorded 14 tackles, one fumble recovery (the first of his career) and one pass deflected. In a victory over Chicago (Dec. 7), Brown posted a season-high four stops, along with a pass breakup.

On March 2, 2004, the Packers released Brown. He had played 125 Packers games (103 starts) with 292 tackles (186 solo) and seven sacks. He also played in 15 Packers playoff games. In franchise history, only Brett Favre (22), Mason Crosby (23) and Aaron Rodgers (21) have more.

In 2014, Brown made the NFL Top 10 list of "Big Guys" at #2.

== Life after football ==
Brown started the Gilbert Brown Foundation, which helps inner-city kids, and many other causes such as Breast Cancer and Make A Wish. In 2002, he combined his love for cars with his desire to give back when he organized a car show, Gilbert Brown and Friends, in Elkhart Lake, Wisconsin, which benefited the Make-a-Wish Foundation.

On October 23, 2007, the Milwaukee Bonecrushers of the Continental Indoor Football League announced that Brown had signed a three-year contract to be the team's new head coach. The Bonecrushers began their season in March. However On Tuesday, April 8, 2008, Gilbert Brown resigned as head coach of the Milwaukee Bonecrushers citing irreconcilable differences with ownership.

In 2008, he was inducted into the Green Bay Packers Hall of Fame.

On August 6, 2009, it was announced that Brown would return to coaching as the first head coach of the expansion La Crosse Spartans of the Indoor Football League.

On April 1, 2011, Brown announced he was taking a leave of absence from the La Crosse Spartans.

From 2011 until 2014, Brown was the head coach of the Green Bay Chill of the Lingerie Football League, which was later renamed as the Legends Football League.
