= Lahi =

Lahi may refer to:

- Riho Lahi (1904–1995), Estonian writer and journalist
- Lahi, Papua New Guinea

== See also ==
- Lehi (disambiguation)
