= Flint Phantoms =

American indoor football team

Logo

General information
- Founded: 2008
- Folded: 2008
- Headquartered: Perani Arena in Flint, Michigan
- Colors: Black, Blue, Silver & White

Personnel
- Head coach: Keith Tunstall

Team history
- Flint Phantoms (2008)

Home fields
- Perani Arena (2008)

League / conference affiliations
- Continental Indoor Football League (2008): Atlantic Conference (2008); West Division (2008)

The Flint Phantoms were a professional indoor football team based in Flint, Michigan. The Phantoms joined the Continental Indoor Football League (CIFL) in 2008 as an expansion team. They were the second professional indoor football team to be based in Flint, with the first being the Flint Flames of the original Indoor Football League. The Michigan Pirates played a home playoff game in Flint, in 2007, with the idea of moving there, but the team folded after the 2007 season. The Phantoms played their home games at the Perani Arena and Event Center in Flint, Michigan.

== History ==
With the limited success of Perani Arena as the playoff home for the Michigan Pirates, Pete Norager, one of the owners of the Pirates, decided to start a replacement team in Flint, and the formation of the Phantoms was announced on December 18, 2007. In February 2008, Norager withdrew from owning the team. The Perani Group operated the team pending the selection of a new owner with a temporary investment group. Because of poor attendance, payments to players were delayed near the end of the 2008 season, and some players left the team because of other commitments or disgruntlement over late pay. The Phantoms approached their last game of 2008 with a roster of just 9 or 10 or maybe 50 and looked to semi-pro teams for additional players. On the day of the game, only 11 players were available (with 16 required to field a team), forcing the Phantoms to forfeit.

The team has sat out the 2009 season but still is considering rejoining the CIFL.

== Season-by-season ==
Season records
Season	W	L	T	Finish	Playoff results
2008	1	11	0	4th Atlantic West	--

== 2008 season schedule ==
Date	Opponent	Home/Away	Result
March 9	Saginaw Sting	Home	Lost 25-51
March 21	Kalamazoo Xplosion	Away	Lost 8-62
March 28	New England Surge	Home	Lost 28-38
April 6	Milwaukee Bonecrushers	Away	Won 62-53
April 11	Saginaw Sting	Away	Lost 28-55
April 19	Kalamazoo Xplosion	Home	Lost 18-44
April 26	New England Surge	Away	Lost 48-49
May 10	Muskegon Thunder	Home	Lost 42-55
May 17	Rock River Raptors	Away	Lost 38-69
May 24	Rochester Raiders	Home	Lost 12-35
May 31	Rock River Raptors	Home	Lost 6-49
June 8	Rochester Raiders	Away	Loss by Forfeit

=== 2008 CIFL standings ===
2008 Continental Indoor Football League
Team	Overall				Division			
Team	W	L	T	PCT	W	L	T	PCT
Great Lakes Conference
East Division
Kalamazoo Xplosion-y	11	1	0	.917	5	1	0	.833
Muskegon Thunder-x	5	7	0	.417	2	2	0	.500
Fort Wayne Freedom	5	7	0	.417	2	4	0	.333
Miami Valley Silverbacks	3	9	0	.250	1	2	0	.333
West Division
Chicago Slaughter-y	8	4	0	.667	3	1	0	.750
Rock River Raptors-x	7	5	0	.583	3	1	0	.750
Milwaukee Bonecrushers	1	11	0	.083	0	4	0	.000
Atlantic Conference
East Division
New England Surge-y	8	3	0	.727	5	1	0	.833
Lehigh Valley Outlawz-x	7	5	0	.583	4	2	0	.667
New Jersey Revolution	3	9	0	.250	2	5	0	.286
Chesapeake Tide	2	10	0	.583	0	2	0	.000
West Division
Rochester Raiders-z	12	0	0	1.000	4	0	0	1.000
Saginaw Sting-y	10	2	0	.833	3	1	0	.750
Marion Mayhem-x	7	5	0	.583	0	2	0	.000
Flint Phantoms	1	11	0	.083	0	4	0	.000
