= Lehigh High School =

Lehigh High School can refer to more than one educational institution in the United States:

- Lehigh Senior High School, in Lehigh Acres, Florida
- Lehigh High School (Kansas), in Lehigh, Kansas, merged with Hillsboro High School (Kansas) in 1960s
- Northern Lehigh High School, in Slatington, Pennsylvania

== See also ==
- Lehigh (disambiguation)
