= Lehigh Valley (disambiguation) =

The Lehigh Valley is a region in Lehigh and Northampton counties of eastern Pennsylvania.

Lehigh Valley may also refer to:

- Lehigh Valley AVA
- Lehigh Valley College
- Lehigh Valley Conference
- Lehigh Valley Health Network
- Lehigh Valley Hospital–Cedar Crest
- Lehigh Valley International Airport
- Lehigh Valley IronPigs
- Lehigh Valley Phantoms
- Lehigh Valley Mall
- Lehigh Valley Outlawz
- Lehigh Valley Railroad
- Lehigh Valley Steam
- Penn State Lehigh Valley
- U.S. Route 22 in Pennsylvania, also known as the Lehigh Valley Thruway
