= Kalamazoo Xplosion =

Logo

General information
- Founded: 2007
- Folded: 2008
- Headquartered: Wings Stadium in Kalamazoo, Michigan
- Colors: Gold, Black
- Mascot: Xplodey the Coyote

Personnel
- Owners: Mike Johnson; Mike Trumbell; Esteban Rivera
- Head coach: Mike Sparks
- President: Mike Johnson; Mike Trumbell; Esteban Rivera

Team history
- Kalamazoo Xplosion (2007–2008)

Home fields
- Wings Stadium (2007–2008)

League / conference affiliations
- Continental Indoor Football League (2007–2008): Great Lakes Division (2007); Great Lakes Conference (2008); East Division (2008)

Championships
- Conference championships: 1: 2008
- Division championships: 1: 2008

Playoff appearances (2)
- 2007, 2008

The Kalamazoo Xplosion was an indoor football team based in Kalamazoo, Michigan. The Xplosion began play in 2007 expansion team of the Continental Indoor Football League. They played their home games at Wings Stadium.

== History ==
Original team owners are Mike Johnson, Mike Trumbell, and Esteban Rivera, who also owned the Saginaw Sting. A number of Sting players and Xplosion players indicated at the end of the 2008 season that wages were in arrears from the owners. This led to an investigation of Johnson in his role as Sting General Manager. Trumbell, owner of Triple Threat Sports in Battle Creek, and Rivera, a Battle Creek police officer, have offered a deal to split ownership of the two teams, with Trumbell and Rivera owning the Sting, and Johnson receiving the Xplosion.

== Season-by-season ==
Season records
Season	W	L	T	Finish	Playoff results
2007	10	2	0	2nd Great Lakes	Won GLD Semifinal (Chicago); Lost GLD Championship (Michigan)
2008	11	1	0	1st Great Lakes East	Won GLD East Finals (Muskegon); Won GLD Championship (Rock River); Lost CIFL Championship (Saginaw)
Totals	24	5	0	(including playoffs)	

== 2007 season schedule ==
Date	Opponent	Home/Away	Result
March 24	Marion Mayhem	Away	Won 37-35
April 7	Springfield Stallions	Away	Won 47-19
April 14	Chicago Slaughter	Home	Won 34-21
April 21	Marion Mayhem	Home	Won 39-31
April 28	Springfield Stallions	Home	Won 38-14
May 5	Muskegon Thunder	Home	Won 41-37
May 11	Miami Valley Silverbacks	Away	Won 40-37
May 20	Chicago Slaughter	Away	Lost 47-51
May 28	Summit County Rumble	Home	Won 75-20
June 2	Miami Valley Silverbacks	Home	Won 41-21
June 8	Port Huron Pirates	Away	Lost 20-55
June 16	Muskegon Thunder	Away	Won 34-28
July 7	Chicago Slaughter (Playoffs)	Home	Won 51-40
July 13	Michigan Pirates (Playoffs)	Away (Flint)	Lost 29-37

=== 2007 CIFL standings ===
2007 Continental Indoor Football League
Team	Overall				Division			
Team	W	L	T	PCT	W	L	T	PCT
Great Lakes Conference
Michigan Pirates-y	12	0	0	1.000	10	0	0	1.000
Kalamazoo Xplosion-x	10	2	0	.833	10	2	0	.833
Chicago Slaughter-x	9	3	0	.750	8	2	0	.800
Marion Mayhem-x	6	6	0	.500	6	5	0	.545
Muskegon Thunder-x	4	8	0	.333	4	7	0	.364
Miami Valley Silverbacks	4	8	0	.333	3	7	0	.300
Summit County Rumble	1	11	0	.083	0	7	0	.000
Springfield Stallions	0	12	0	.000	0	11	0	.000
Atlantic Conference
Rochester Raiders-y	10	2	0	.833	90	0	0	1.000
New England Surge-x	8	4	0	.667	8	3	0	.727
Lehigh Valley Outlawz-x	7	5	0	.583	5	5	0	.500
Chesapeake Tide-x	7	5	0	.583	6	5	0	.545
Steubenville Stampede	5	7	0	.417	2	6	0	.250
NY/NJ Revolution	1	11	0	.083	0	11	0	.000

== 2008 season schedule ==
Date	Opponent	Home/Away	Result
March 7	Chicago Slaughter	Away	Won 46-39 (OT)
March 14	Rock River Raptors	Home	Won 33-26 (OT)
March 21	Flint Phantoms	Home	Won 62-8
March 27	Fort Wayne Freedom	Away	Won 50-34
April 4	Muskegon Thunder	Away	Lost 37-44 (OT)
April 11	Chicago Slaughter	Home	Won 54-48
April 19	Flint Phantoms	Away	Won 44-18
May 3	Muskegon Thunder	Home	Won 49-19
May 10	Rock River Raptors	Away	Won 36-28
May 16	Miami Valley Silverbacks	Away	Won 48-13
May 31	Miami Valley Silverbacks	Home	Won 46-43
June 7	Fort Wayne Freedom	Home	Won 39-32
June 14	Muskegon Thunder (Playoffs)	Home	Won 50-33
June 21	Rock River Raptors (Playoffs)	Home	Won 56-42
June 29	Saginaw Sting (CIFL Championship)	Home	Loss 37-41

=== 2008 CIFL standings ===
2008 Continental Indoor Football League
Team	Overall				Division			
Team	W	L	T	PCT	W	L	T	PCT
Great Lakes Conference
East Division
Kalamazoo Xplosion-y	11	1	0	.917	5	1	0	.833
Muskegon Thunder-x	5	7	0	.417	2	2	0	.500
Fort Wayne Freedom	5	7	0	.417	2	4	0	.333
Miami Valley Silverbacks	3	9	0	.250	1	2	0	.333
West Division
Chicago Slaughter-y	8	4	0	.667	3	1	0	.750
Rock River Raptors-x	7	5	0	.583	3	1	0	.750
Milwaukee Bonecrushers	1	11	0	.083	0	4	0	.000
Atlantic Conference
East Division
New England Surge-y	8	3	0	.727	5	1	0	.833
Lehigh Valley Outlawz-x	7	5	0	.583	4	2	0	.667
New Jersey Revolution	3	9	0	.250	2	5	0	.286
Chesapeake Tide	2	10	0	.583	0	2	0	.000
West Division
Rochester Raiders-z	12	0	0	1.000	4	0	0	1.000
Saginaw Sting-y	10	2	0	.833	3	1	0	.750
Marion Mayhem-x	7	5	0	.583	0	2	0	.000
Flint Phantoms	1	11	0	.083	0	4	0	.000
