= Lehigh Line =

Articles on Lehigh Line include:

- Lehigh Valley Railroad, a former railroad that merged into Conrail
  - Lehigh Valley Railway, a former short line railroad owned by the Lehigh Valley Railroad
  - Lehigh Line (Norfolk Southern) (original Lehigh Line, formerly known as Lehigh Valley Mainline), the Lehigh Valley Railroad's main line, now owned by Norfolk Southern Railway
    - Lehigh Line (Conrail), a rail line owned by Conrail Shared Assets Operations, was once part of the original Lehigh Line
      - Lehigh Line Connection, a railroad connection near Newark, New Jersey
