= Lehigh Township =

Lehigh Township is the name of a few townships in the United States:

- Lehigh Township, Marion County, Kansas
- Lehigh Township, Carbon County, Pennsylvania
- Lehigh Township, Northampton County, Pennsylvania
- Lehigh Township, Wayne County, Pennsylvania
