= West Michigan ThunderHawks =

Arena football team

Logo

General information
- Founded: 2007
- Folded: 2010
- Headquartered: DeltaPlex Arena in Grand Rapids, Michigan
- Colors: Navy blue, powder blue, gold

Personnel
- General manager: Rob Preston
- Head coach: Terry Foster
- President: Don Pringle

Team history
- Muskegon Thunder (2007–2009); West Michigan ThunderHawks (2010)

Home fields
- L. C. Walker Arena (2007–2009); DeltaPlex Arena (2010)

League / conference affiliations
- Continental Indoor Football League (2007–2008): Great Lakes Conference (2008); Great Lakes Division (2007); East Division (2008); Indoor Football League (2009–2010): United Conference (2009–2010); Atlantic Division (2007); Atlantic East Division (2010)

Championships
- League championships: 0; 0
- Conference championships: 0; 0
- Division championships: 0; 0

Playoff appearances (2)
- 2007, 2008

The West Michigan ThunderHawks were an indoor football team based in Grand Rapids, Michigan. The team was most recently a member of the Indoor Football League. From their inception in 2007 until 2009, the ThunderHawks were known as the Muskegon Thunder and played at L.C. Walker Arena (in their first two seasons they played in the Continental Indoor Football League). In 2010, the team moved to Grand Rapids, MI. This is where the downfall of the team took place. The season started off hopeful with a 5–2 record. After week 7 the players were promised money at a later date as long as they played (money that they never received). Starting in 2010, the ThunderHawks played their home games at the DeltaPlex Arena, in nearby Walker, Michigan. The Thunderhawks did not field a team in 2011.

== Franchise history ==
=== 2007 ===
For their first season, the Thunder had Shane Fairfield as head coach. Fairfield was an accomplished local high school football coach, as he led the Holton Red Devils to a conference championship as well as two back to back district championships against Muskegon Catholic. Prior to that he coached his alma mater Muskegon Catholic Central, and Muskegon High School.

For their first season with their brand-new identity, the head coach and defensive coordinator was Detroit native, Terry Foster. Foster was once a star for the Grand Valley State University team, and played in the Arena Football League for the Grand Rapids Rampage. In 2006, Foster was an assistant coach for the Rampage. Offensive coordinator Brent White almost mirrored Fairfield's path from Muskegon to Holton, playing for the Big Reds from 1999 to 2002 and then stepping off the field as assistant JV coach at Holton. Soon afterward, he quickly became offensive coordinator for the Holton Red Devils, where he led his team to some record-breaking performances.

==== Schedule ====
Date	Opponent	Home/Away	Result
March 24	Summit County Rumble	Neutral (Steubenville)	Won 42-21
March 31	Marion Mayhem	Away	Lost 20-48
April 13	Summit County Rumble	Home	Won 54-12
April 21	Port Huron Pirates	Home	Lost 13-47
April 28	Chicago Slaughter	Home	Lost 40-57
May 5	Kalamazoo Xplosion	Away	Lost 37-41
May 12	Port Huron Pirates	Away	Lost 37-76
May 19	Springfield Stallions	Away	Won 49-25
May 26	Springfield Stallions	Home	Won 52-36
June 9	Chicago Slaughter	Home	Lost 34-58
June 16	Kalamazoo Xplosion	Home	Lost 28-34
June 23	Lehigh Valley Outlawz	Home	Lost 54-55
June 29	Marion Mayhem (Playoffs)	Away	Lost 57-68

==== Standings ====
2007 Continental Indoor Football League
Team	Overall				Division			
Team	W	L	T	PCT	W	L	T	PCT
Great Lakes Conference
Michigan Pirates-y	12	0	0	1.000	10	0	0	1.000
Kalamazoo Xplosion-x	10	2	0	.833	10	2	0	.833
Chicago Slaughter-x	9	3	0	.750	8	2	0	.800
Marion Mayhem-x	6	6	0	.500	6	5	0	.545
Muskegon Thunder-x	4	8	0	.333	4	7	0	.364
Miami Valley Silverbacks	4	8	0	.333	3	7	0	.300
Summit County Rumble	1	11	0	.083	0	7	0	.000
Springfield Stallions	0	12	0	.000	0	11	0	.000
Atlantic Conference
Rochester Raiders-y	10	2	0	.833	90	0	0	1.000
New England Surge-x	8	4	0	.667	8	3	0	.727
Lehigh Valley Outlawz-x	7	5	0	.583	5	5	0	.500
Chesapeake Tide-x	7	5	0	.583	6	5	0	.545
Steubenville Stampede	5	7	0	.417	2	6	0	.250
NY/NJ Revolution	1	11	0	.083	0	11	0	.000

=== 2008 ===
==== Schedule ====
Date	Opponent	Home/Away	Result
March 8	Marion Mayhem	Home	Lost 34-33
March 21	Rock River Raptors	Home	Won 44-36
March 29	Milwaukee Bonecrushers	Away	Won 60-35
April 4	Kalamazoo Xplosion	Home	Won 44-37 (OT)
April 12	Fort Wayne Freedom	Home	Won 39-33
April 25	Chicago Slaughter	Home	Lost 10-27
May 3	Kalamazoo Xplosion	Away	Lost 19-49
May 10	Flint Phantoms	Away	Won 55-42
May 17	Milwaukee Bonecrushers	Home	Lost 46-51
May 24	Fort Wayne Freedom	Away	Lost 38-42
May 31	Chicago Slaughter	Away	Lost 35-38
June 6	Saginaw Sting	Away	Lost 23-60
June 14	Kalamazoo Xplosion (Playoffs)	Away	Lost 33-50

==== Standings ====
2008 Continental Indoor Football League
Team	Overall				Division			
Team	W	L	T	PCT	W	L	T	PCT
Great Lakes Conference
East Division
Kalamazoo Xplosion-y	11	1	0	.917	5	1	0	.833
Muskegon Thunder-x	5	7	0	.417	2	2	0	.500
Fort Wayne Freedom	5	7	0	.417	2	4	0	.333
Miami Valley Silverbacks	3	9	0	.250	1	2	0	.333
West Division
Chicago Slaughter-y	8	4	0	.667	3	1	0	.750
Rock River Raptors-x	7	5	0	.583	3	1	0	.750
Milwaukee Bonecrushers	1	11	0	.083	0	4	0	.000
Atlantic Conference
East Division
New England Surge-y	8	3	0	.727	5	1	0	.833
Lehigh Valley Outlawz-x	7	5	0	.583	4	2	0	.667
New Jersey Revolution	3	9	0	.250	2	5	0	.286
Chesapeake Tide	2	10	0	.583	0	2	0	.000
West Division
Rochester Raiders-z	12	0	0	1.000	4	0	0	1.000
Saginaw Sting-y	10	2	0	.833	3	1	0	.750
Marion Mayhem-x	7	5	0	.583	0	2	0	.000
Flint Phantoms	1	11	0	.083	0	4	0	.000

=== 2009 ===
On January 18, 2009, Adam Pringle, a former player who started at Nose Guard, part-owner of the club, and son of the club's president, died from injuries sustained in a snowmobile accident.

== Season-by-season results ==
League champions	Conference champions	Division champions	Wild card berth	League leader

Season	Team	League	Conference	Division	Regular season				Postseason results
Season	Team	League	Conference	Division	Finish	Wins	Losses	Ties	Postseason results
2007	2007	CIFL		Great Lakes	5th	4	8		Lost Great Lakes Division Qualifier 57-68 (Marion)
2008	2008	CIFL	Great Lakes	East	2nd	5	7		Lost Divisional 33-50 (Kalamazoo)
2009	2009	IFL	United	Atlantic	5th	1	13		
2010	2010	IFL	United	Atlantic East	3rd	5	9		
Totals						15	37		All-time regular season record (2007–2010)
Totals						0	2	-	All-time postseason record (2007–2010)
Totals						15	39		All-time regular season and postseason record (2007–2010)

== Notable players ==
- Stephen Wasil - QB
- Cullen Finnerty - QB
