= 2008 Continental Indoor Football League season =

2008 CIFL season
- League: Continental Indoor Football League
- Sport: Indoor Football

Regular season
- Season champions: Rochester Raiders
- Season MVP: David Gater, KAL

League postseason
- Great Lakes champions: Kalamazoo Xplosion
- Great Lakes runners-up: Rock River Raptors
- Atlantic champions: Saginaw Sting
- Atlantic runners-up: Lehigh Valley Outlawz

CIFL Championship Game
- Champions: Saginaw Sting
- Runners-up: Kalamazoo Xplosion
- Finals MVP: Nick Body (SAG)

CIFL seasons
- ← 2007 2009 →

The 2008 Continental Indoor Football League season is the league's third overall season. The season began on Friday, March 7, and ended on Sunday, June 29th, with the CIFL Championship Game.

== Standings ==
Final Standings

Team	Overall			Division		
Team	Wins	Losses	Percentage	Wins	Losses	Percentage
Great Lakes Conference
East Division
Kalamazoo Xplosion	11	1	0.917	5	1	0.833
Muskegon Thunder	5	7	0.417	2	2	0.500
Fort Wayne Freedom	5	7	0.417	2	4	0.333
Miami Valley Silverbacks	3	9	0.250	1	2	0.333
West Division
Chicago Slaughter	8	4	0.667	3	1	0.750
Rock River Raptors	7	5	0.583	3	1	0.750
Milwaukee Bonecrushers	1	11	0.083	0	4	0.000
Atlantic Conference
East Division
New England Surge	8	3	0.727	5	1	0.833
Lehigh Valley Outlawz	6	5	0.545	4	2	0.667
New Jersey Revolution	3	9	0.250	2	5	0.286
Chesapeake Tide	2	10	0.167	2	5	0.286
West Division
Rochester Raiders	12	0	1.000	4	0	1.000
Saginaw Sting	10	2	0.833	3	1	0.750
Marion Mayhem	7	5	0.583	0	2	0.000
Flint Phantoms	1	11	0.083	0	4	0.000

- No color is given to Rochester due to their withdrawal from the league
- Blue indicates eliminated from playoff contention
- Green indicates clinched playoff berth
- Yellow indicates clinched division title
- Red indicates clinched conference title
- Gray will indicate clinched conference title and home field advantage throughout playoffs

=== Continental Bowl Playoffs ===
- Note: The Lehigh Valley/New England Playoff Game was played at Stabler Arena, Lehigh Valley had home field advantage, regardless of New England having a better record
- Due to Rochester's withdrawal from the league, Saginaw had a first round home playoff game against Marion

Division Championships
2	Lehigh Valley	27
1	New England	21
Great Lakes Conference
2	Marion	34
1	Saginaw	41
2	Rock River	54
1	Chicago	39
Atlantic Conference
2	Muskegon	33
1	Kalamazoo	50

Conference Championships
E2	Lehigh Valley	25
W1	Saginaw	59
W2	Rock River	42
E1	Kalamazoo	56

CIFL Continental Game
A1	Saginaw	41
GL1	Kalamazoo	37

== 2008 Award Winners ==
- CIFL Most Valuable Player - David Gater, Kalamazoo Xplosion
- Offensive Player of the Year - Randy Bell, Rock River Raptors
- Defensive Player of the Year - David Gater, Kalamazoo Xplosion
- Special Teams Player of the Year - Brad Selent, Kalamazoo Xplosion
- Coach of the Year - Mike Sparks, Kalamazoo Xplosion
