= Marion Mayhem =

Logo

General information
- Founded: 2006
- Folded: 2010
- Headquartered: Marion, Ohio at the Veterans Memorial Coliseum
- Colors: Navy, Green, White
- Mascot: Hardy the Mayhem Maniac

Personnel
- Owners: Michael Burtch; Stanley Jackson
- General manager: LaMonte Coleman
- Head coach: Tracy Smith (2006); Nathan Degasperis (2007); Pepe Pearson (2008–2009); Reginald Jones (2010)
- President: Jill Chitwood

Team history
- Marion Mayhem (2006–2010)

Home fields
- Veterans Memorial Coliseum (2006–2010)

League / conference affiliations
- Great Lakes/Continental Indoor Football League (2006–2010): Great Lakes Division (2007); Atlantic Conference (2008); West Division (2008); East Division (2009)

Championships
- Division championships: 1; 2009

Playoff appearances (3)
- 2007, 2008, 2009

The Marion Mayhem were a professional indoor football team based in Marion, Ohio. The team was a charter member of the Great Lakes Indoor Football League (GLIFL), later renamed the Continental Indoor Football League (CIFL), joining in 2006 as an expansion team. The Mayhem were the first professional indoor football team to be based in Marion, but were the second pro football team to be based in the area since the NFL's Oorang Indians. The team folded during the 2010 season due to financial problems. The Owners of the Mayhem were Michael Burtch and Stanley Jackson. They played their home games at the Veterans Memorial Coliseum in Marion, Ohio.

== Franchise history ==
=== 2006 ===
The Mayhem were announced to the public on September 16, 2005, as the fourth expansion team for the newly formed Great Lakes Indoor Football League. Their inaugural owners of the Mayhem were 4th Down and Long LLC, run by R.A. Mallonn, Fred Horner, Tim Cugini, and John Slebodnik. The team hired Tracy Smith as their inaugural coach and general manager on November 2, 2005. The Mayhem suffered a losing inaugural season in 2006 (4–6), however the Mayhem were within one game of the 2006 GLIFL playoffs. The Mayhem missed the playoffs due to the Battle Creek Crunch holding the tie breaker between the two teams.

=== 2007 ===
Before the season began, 4th Down and Long LLC sold the team to Michael Burtch. Joining the team would be former Ohio State University quarterback, Stanley Jackson. Jackson would later become a part owner of the franchise due to their small budget operation. Jackson went on to set league records for pass completions (177), pass attempts (348) and interceptions thrown (16). Marion finished 6–6 in 2007, good enough to make the CIFL playoffs. After knocking off the Muskegon Thunder in the first round of the CIFL playoffs, the Mayhem's season was ended by a loss to the Michigan (formally Port Huron) Pirates.

=== 2008 ===
Finishing with a 7–5 record in 2008, the Mayhem were eliminated from the 2008 CIFL playoffs. The Mayhem players had already turned in their equipment for the year when it was announced that the defending CIFL champion Rochester Raiders (12–0) had been suspended by the league and had to forfeit their playoff spot. The Mayhem were invited to replace the former champs in the CIFL Atlantic Conference Western Division playoffs where they would face their conference foe Saginaw. The Mayhem gathered their players back together and headed to Saginaw to face the Sting. The playoff game went down to the wire where a goal-line stand by the Saginaw defense with only seconds left on the clock ended the Mayhem's season. The final score Sting 41 – Mayhem 34.

=== 2009 ===
The Mayhem finished the regular season with a 9–3 record in 2009. This was good enough to earn them the 2009 CIFL East Division Regular Season Title and the opportunity to host the East Division Championship Game. This was the third season in a row the Mayhem made the playoffs. Their opponent in the East Division Championship Game was the Fort Wayne Freedom (6–5). Coming into the game the Freedom had been experiencing money problems and up until three days before the East Division Championship Game the Freedom still were not sure they were going to show up in Marion. But when game time came the Freedom, whom brought a smaller than usual roster that had not practiced regularly for a couple of weeks, played with more heart and determination then the Mayhem and won 49–40.

=== 2010 ===
On Christmas Eve 2009, the Mayhem announced they would not be playing in Marion in 2010, citing the economic downturn. According to the ownership of the team, "if the situation in Marion improves they may entertain the idea of returning the Mayhem to Marion". As part of the disbanding of the Mayhem organization, all players, coaches, and staff were transferred to the new CIFL team starting play in 2010, the Columbus Aces. However, in late January 2010 rumors of the potential folding of the Columbus Aces started circulating. Then a couple of weeks into February 2010 a new rumor began that the Mayhem would be returning to Marion. This was confirmed in the Marion Star when it was reported that the Marion Mayhem had been purchased by Cheyenne Sports Group and would return to Marion. On May 27, 2010 after starting the season 3–3 it was announced that the Marion Mayhem would forfeit the remaining games on their schedule due to financial issues. When the franchise folded, the players fled to other teams in the league. A majority of the players ended up with the Fort Wayne FireHawks, who would go on to lose to the Wisconsin Wolfpack in the playoffs. The Marion Mayhem were the last remaining original GLIFL team left in the CIFL.

== Notable players ==
See Category:Marion Mayhem players

=== Awards and honors ===
The following is a list of all Marion Mayhem players who have won GLIFL or CIFL awards.

Season	Player	Position	Award
2009	Bryceon Lawrence	DB	Defensive Player of the Year
2010	Mike Tatum	WR	Special Teams Player of the Year

== Head coaches ==
Name	Term	Regular season				Playoffs		Awards
Name	Term	W	L	T	Win%	W	L	Awards
Tracy Smith	2006	4	6	0	.400	0	0	
Nathan Degasperis	2007	6	6	0	.500	1	1	
Pepe Pearson	2008–2009	16	8	0	.667	0	2	
Reginald Jones	2010	3	3	0	.500	0	0	

== Season-by-season results ==
League champions	Conference champions	Division champions	Wild card berth	League leader

Season	Team	League	Conference	Division	Regular season				Postseason results
Season	Team	League	Conference	Division	Finish	Wins	Losses	Ties	Postseason results
2006	2006	GLIFL			5th	4	6	0	
2007	2007	CIFL		Great Lakes	4th	6	6	0	Won 1st round (Thunder) 68–57; Lost 2nd Round (Pirates) 20–70
2008	2008	CIFL	Atlantic	West	4th	7	5	0	Lost Atlantic semifinals (Sting) 34–41
2009	2009	CIFL		East	1st	9	3	0	Lost East Finals (Freedom) 40–49
2010	2010	CIFL			5th	3	3	0	
Totals						29	26	0	All-time regular season record (2006–2010)
Totals						1	3	-	All-time postseason record (2006–2010)
Totals						30	29	0	All-time regular season and postseason record (2006–2010)
