= Chicago Knights =

American indoor football team

Logo

General information
- Founded: 2007
- Folded: 2011
- Headquartered: Victory Sports Complex in Loves Park, Illinois
- Colors: Black, Blue, Silver, White

Personnel
- Head coach: John Burns

Team history
- Milwaukee Bonecrushers (2008–2009); Chicago Cardinals (2010); Chicago Knights (2011)

Home fields
- U.S. Cellular Arena (2008–2009); Odeum Expo Center (2010); Victory Sports Complex (2011)

League / conference affiliations
- Continental Indoor Football League (2008–2011): Great Lakes Conference (2008); West Division (2008–2009)

Playoff appearances (1)
- 2011

The Chicago Knights were a professional indoor football team based in Loves Park, Illinois. The Knights were founded in 2010 as a member of the Continental Indoor Football League (CIFL), playing their home games at the Victory Sports Complex.

The Knights were the third Indoor Football Team based in Northern Illinois. The Chicago Rush of the Arena Football League were based in Rosemont, and the Chicago Slaughter of the Indoor Football League are based in Hoffman Estates. The Knights replaced the Chicago Cardinals as the Illinois-based CIFL team, which had replaced the Slaughter after they left for the Indoor Football League after a dispute with CIFL management.

== Franchise history ==
=== 2008–2009: Milwaukee Bonecrushers ===
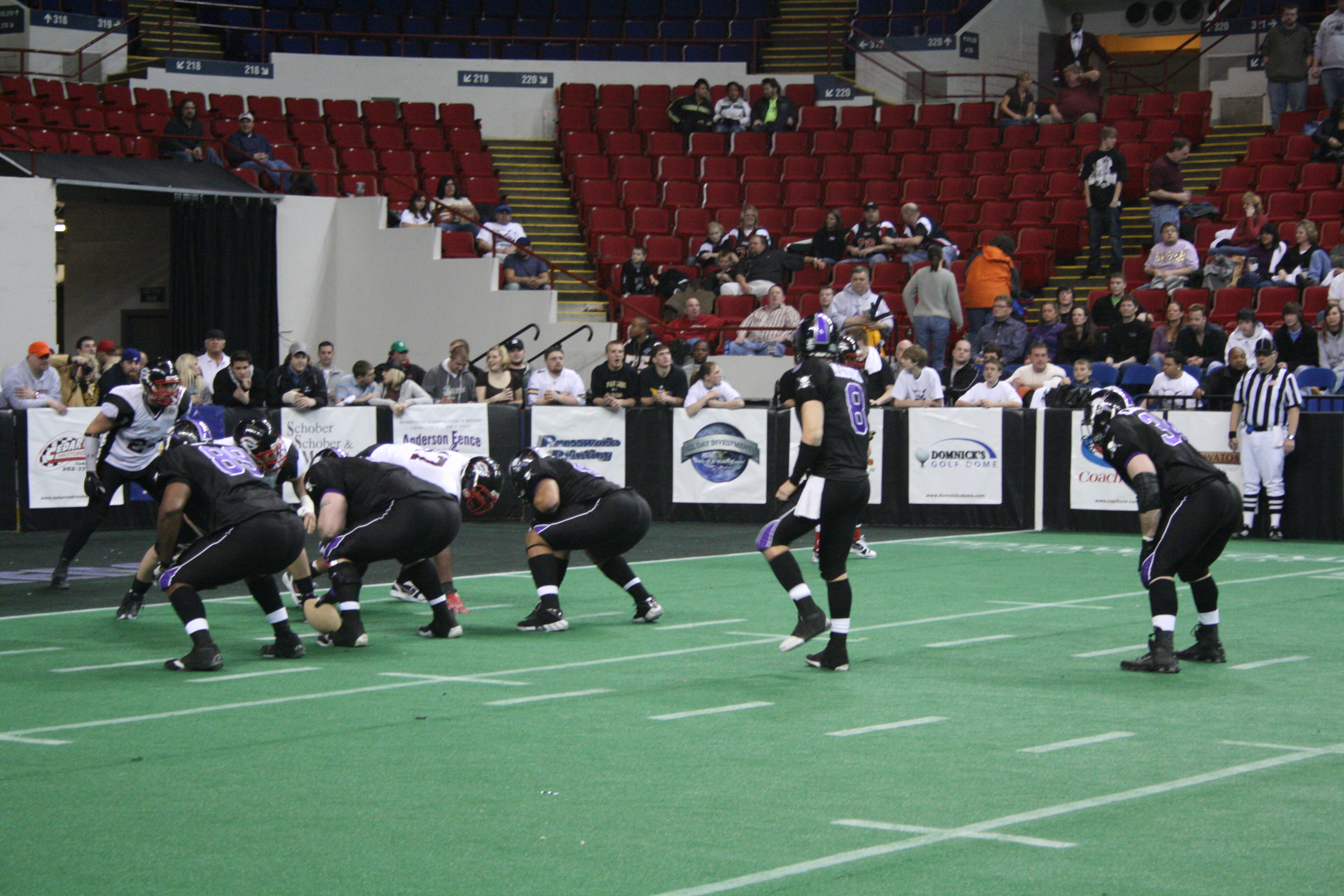
Quarterback Ryan Maiuri taking a snap against the Chicago Slaughter in 2008

The Milwaukee Bonecrushers were a team in the Continental Indoor Football League. They played their home games at the U.S. Cellular Arena. The Bonecrushers were Milwaukee's second indoor football franchise, following the Milwaukee Mustangs of the Arena Football League.

The franchise made an immediate splash in Milwaukee when it announced former Green Bay Packer Gilbert Brown signed a three-year contract to be the team's first head coach. However, the optimism quickly faded when Brown announced he was resigning from the position after just three games on April 8, 2008. Much of the team's staff and many of the team's players also left at the same time, raising eyebrows among the Milwaukee media and fans. The Bonecrushers finished 2008 with a hodgepodge of players and coaches, winning just one game, a 51–46 road contest against the Muskegon Thunder featuring a 26-yard touchdown by Bonecrushers' quarterback Brian Ryczkowski with seconds left to set up a 1 yard game-winning TD run by Ryczkowski on the final play of the game.

Milwaukee Bonecrushers Logo

The rumored reasoning behind the exodus of many of the original members of the franchise was the team's inability to pay its bills or personnel. This was confirmed when a judgment was entered against the Bonecrushers in favor of Challenger Industries, the company that sold the team its game field AstroTurf, in the amount of $29,539.29 on October 15, 2008. Challenger resolved its claim against John Burns, one of the owners of the Milwaukee Bonecrushers, prior to the matter going to trial.

The Bonecrushers returned to action in 2009 with renewed optimism after signing LeRoy McFadden, brother of NFL player Darren McFadden, as its new head coach, as well as the previous year's CIFL Offensive Player of the Year, Randy Bell. However, McFadden also chose to resign after just three games, leaving assistant coach, John Burns, to take over as head coach. The Bonecrushers survived the 2009 season in Milwaukee with minimal attendance and finished 3–8.

Prior to the 2010 season, the Bonecrushers management reorganized and the team elected to cease operations in Milwaukee. Many of the individuals involved with the Bonecrushers, including Burns, moved onto be part of the new Chicago Cardinals franchise based in Villa Park, Ill.

While the Bonecrushers franchise is generally regarded as having failed in the eyes of Milwaukeeans, their existence did help create two other CIFL franchises: The Cardinals and the Wisconsin Wolfpack. Plans had already been in place for the Wolfpack to field its first outdoor team in the summer of 2008 when Brown left the Bonecrushers. Eventually, many members of the Wolfpack's staff were brought in to help the Bonecrushers complete the indoor season, including current Green Bay Blizzard Offensive Coordinator Dave Mogensen. In 2009, the Wolfpack fielded a CIFL team of its own in Madison, Wisconsin. The Bonecrushers would play the Wolfpack twice in their final season in Milwaukee, losing both times.

=== 2010: The move to Chicago ===
Chicago Cardinals logo

The Cardinals replaced the Slaughter in the CIFL, after the Slaughter left that league for the IFL due to a dispute with CIFL management. The Cardinals were formerly known as the Milwaukee Bonecrushers, also of the CIFL, and relocated to Villa Park in 2010. The Cardinals use their name with permission from the original National Football League team, now known as the Arizona Cardinals.

The Cardinals only season was one of utter disappointment. After starting 0–2, they signed Kicker Julie Harshbarger, the 2nd female Kicker in the CIFL history. (The other being Katie Hnida of the Fort Wayne Firehawks) After a successful soccer career at Benedictine University and Rockford College, where she was named to several all-conference teams. Harshbarger was not the first woman to score a point in an indoor football game, but she was the first woman ever to score a field goal in a professional indoor football game. After a 20–58 loss on May 22, and seeing their record drop to 0–8, the Cardinals let several of their best players, including the All-Purpose Player of the Year (Brandon Wogoman), leave the team for the nearby, and contending, Wisconsin Wolfpack.

=== 2011: Becoming the Knights ===
The Knights started the season with a painful 7–53 loss to the defending champions, the Cincinnati Commandos. After almost a complete month off, the Knights were back in action on April 2 against the Port Huron Predators, and came away with a 45–29 win. The Knights were led by Brandon Wogoman, the reigning CIFL All-Purpose Player of the Year, who had a rushing touchdown, a passing touchdown and a kick-return touchdown to lead the Knights to their first win since the franchise moved to their present location in 2010. After a conflict with the Odeum Expo Center, the Knights played what was supposed to be a home game in Indianapolis against the Indianapolis Enforcers. Then on April 7, 2011, it was announced that the Knights would play the rest of their games in Loves Park, Illinois, in the Victory Sports Complex.

== Notable players ==
See Category:Chicago Knights players

=== Awards and honors ===
The following is a list of all Bonecrushers/Cardinals/Knights players who won individual awards and honors.

Season	Player	Position	Award
2010	Adrian Henry	DL	2nd Team All-CIFL
2010	Ricky Emery	DB	2nd Team All-CIFL
2010	Brandon Wogoman	KR	2nd Team All-CIFL
2010	Brandon Wogoman	All-Purpose Player	1st Team All-CIFL
2010	Matt Rahn	OL	1st Team All-CIFL
2010	Brandon Wogoman	All-Purpose Player	All-Purpose Player of the Year

== Head coaches ==
Name	Term	Regular season				Playoffs		Awards
Name	Term	W	L	T	Win%	W	L	Awards
Gilbert Brown	2008	0	3	0	.000	0	0	
Michael Tumbleson	2008	1	8	0	.111	0	0	
LeRoy McFadden	2009	1	2	0	.333	0	0	
John Burns	2009–2011	6	22	0	.214	0	1	

== Season-by-season results ==
League champions	Conference champions	Division champions	Wild card berth	League leader

Season	Team	League	Conference	Division	Regular season				Postseason results
Season	Team	League	Conference	Division	Finish	Wins	Losses	Ties	Postseason results
2008	2008	CIFL	Great Lakes	West	3rd	1	11	0	
2009	2009	CIFL		West	4th	3	8	0	
2010	2010	CIFL			6th	0	10	0	
2011	2011	CIFL			4th	4	6	0	Lost CIFL Semifinals (Commandos) 13–71
Totals						8	35	0	All-time regular season record (2008–2012)
Totals						0	1	-	All-time postseason record (2008–2012)
Totals						8	36	0	All-time regular season and postseason record (2008–2012)
