= Maryland Maniacs =

United States indoor football team

Logo

General information
- Founded: 2008
- Folded: 2011
- Headquartered: Cole Field House in College Park, Maryland
- Colors: Black, silver, red, gold, white
- Mascot: Manny the Maniac

Personnel
- Owner: Messay Hailemariam
- General manager: Lisa El
- Head coach: Darryl D’Ateno (interim)

Team history
- Maryland Maniacs (2009–2010)

Home fields
- Cole Field House (2009–2010)

League / conference affiliations
- Indoor Football League (2009–2010): United Conference (2009–2010); Atlantic Division (2009); Atlantic East Division (2010)

Championships
- Division championships: 1; 2009

Playoff appearances (1)
- 2009

The Maryland Maniacs were a professional Indoor Football team based in College Park, Maryland, and a member of the Indoor Football League. The team began play in 2009 as an expansion team in the Indoor Football League. The Maniacs were the second indoor football team to be based in Maryland, following the Chesapeake Tide of the Continental Indoor Football League, who played in the same market. The owner of the Maniacs was Messay Hailemariam. The Maniacs played their home games at Cole Field House. Inaugural season home games were held at The Show Place Arena. They left the Indoor Football League in 2011, and have been with American Indoor Football ever since (being re-branded as the Maryland Eagles).

== Franchise history ==
=== 2009 ===
==== Schedule ====
Date	Opponent	Home/Away	Result
March 29	RiverCity Rage	Home	Lost 24–42
April 2	Fairbanks Grizzlies	Away	Lost 41–72
April 9	Alaska Wild	Away	Won 49–40
April 18	Alaska Wild	Home	Won 52–33
April 24	Muskegon Thunder	Away	Won 40–14
May 2	Rochester Raiders	Home	Won 42–32
May 8	Saginaw Sting	Away	Won 41–32
May 16	Saginaw Sting	Home	Won 40–13
May 23	Rochester Raiders	Home	Won 48–31
May 30	Muskegon Thunder	Home	Won 53–27
June 5	Saginaw Sting	Away	Won 26–25
June 13	Muskegon Thunder	Home	Won 40–20
June 20	Bloomington Extreme	Away	Lost 12–50
June 27	Rochester Raiders	Away	Lost 39–64
July 25	RiverCity Rage (Divisional Playoff)	Away	Lost 31–55

== Season-by-season results ==
Note: The finish, wins, losses, and ties columns list regular season results and exclude any postseason play.

League champions	Conference champions	Division champions	Wild card berth	League leader

Season	Team	League	Conference	Division	Regular season				Postseason results
Season	Team	League	Conference	Division	Finish	Wins	Losses	Ties	Postseason results
2009	2009	IFL	United	Atlantic	1st	10	4		Lost Divisional Round 31–55 (RiverCity)
2010	2010	IFL	United	Atlantic East	4th	1	13		
Totals						11	17		All-time regular season record (2009–2010)
Totals						0	1	-	All-time postseason record (2009–2010)
Totals						11	18		All-time regular season and postseason record (2009–2010)

== Notable players ==
See Category:Maryland Maniacs players
