= Rock River Raptors =

American indoor football team

Logo

General information
- Founded: 2005
- Folded: 2009
- Headquartered: Rockford MetroCentre in Rockford, Illinois
- Colors: Green, Black, White
- Mascot: Vinnie

Personnel
- Head coach: Dave Jones
- President: Bob Lowe

Team history
- Tennessee Valley Raptors (2005); Rock River Raptors (2006–2009)

Home fields
- Rockford MetroCentre (2006–2009)

League / conference affiliations
- United Indoor Football (2005–2007): Southern Division (2005); Central Division (2006); Continental Indoor Football League (2008–2009): Great Lakes Conference (2008); West Division (2008–2009)

Championships
- Division championships: 2: UIF: 2006, 2007

Playoff appearances (4)
- UIF: 2005, 2006, 2007, 2008

The Rock River Raptors were a professional indoor football team based in Rockford, Illinois that played from 2006 to 2009. The franchise competed in United Indoor Football (UIF) before joining the Continental Indoor Football League (CIFL) for its final two seasons.

== Franchise history ==
=== 2004–2006: Move to UIF and Rockford ===
In November 2004, owner Art Clarkson announced that the Tennessee Valley Vipers would leave af2 for the newly formed United Indoor Football. The franchise was initially renamed the Tennessee Valley Pythons. In January 2005, it became the Tennessee Valley Raptors after af2 objected that the Pythons name might be confused with the Vipers.

The Tennessee Valley Raptors moved from Huntsville, Alabama, to Rockford in 2006. After two seasons in UIF, they joined the CIFL for the 2008 season. The franchise did not play in 2010 after failing to reach an agreement on an arena lease.

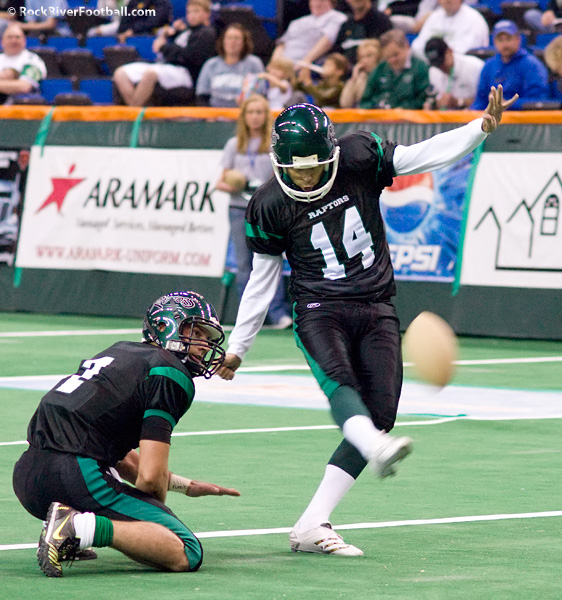
Jim Terry kicking for the Raptors

== Logos and uniforms ==
Original Rock River Raptors logo

Revised Rock River Raptors logo

== Season-by-season ==
Season records
Season	W	L	T	Finish	Playoff results
Tennessee Valley Raptors (UIF)
2005	6	9	0	3rd South	Won Round 1 (Fort Wayne); Lost Semifinals (Sioux City)
Rock River Raptors (UIF)
2006	11	4	0	1st Central	Won Round 1 (Sioux City); Lost Semifinals (Lexington)
2007	10	5	0	1st East	Lost Round 1 (Bloomington)
Rock River Raptors (CIFL)
2008	7	5	0	2nd Great Lakes West	Won GLD West Finals (Chicago); Lost GLD Championship (Kalamazoo)
2009	7	5	0	3rd Western	--
Totals	41	28		(including playoffs)	
