= Modern history of American football =

The modern history of American football can be considered to have begun after the 1932 NFL Playoff Game, which was the first American football game to feature hash marks, the legalization of the forward pass anywhere behind the line of scrimmage, and the movement of the goal posts back to the goal line; it was also the first indoor game since 1902. Other innovations to occur in the years after 1932 were the introduction of the AP Poll in 1934, the tapering of the ends of the football in 1934, the awarding of the first Heisman Trophy in 1935, the first NFL draft in 1936, and the first televised game in 1939.

Another important event was the American football game at the 1932 Summer Olympics, which combined with a similar demonstration game at the 1933 World's Fair, led to the first College All-Star Game in 1934, which in turn was an important factor in the growth of professional football in the United States. American football's explosion in popularity during the second half of the 20th century can be traced to the 1958 NFL Championship Game, a contest that has been dubbed the "Greatest Game Ever Played". A rival league to the NFL, the American Football League (AFL), began play in 1960. In 1966, the NFL initiated the AFL–NFL merger between the two leagues. The merger lead to the creation of the Super Bowl, which has become the most watched television event in the United States on an annual basis.

== Modern history of intercollegiate football (1933–present) ==
=== Modernization of intercollegiate American football (1933–1969) ===
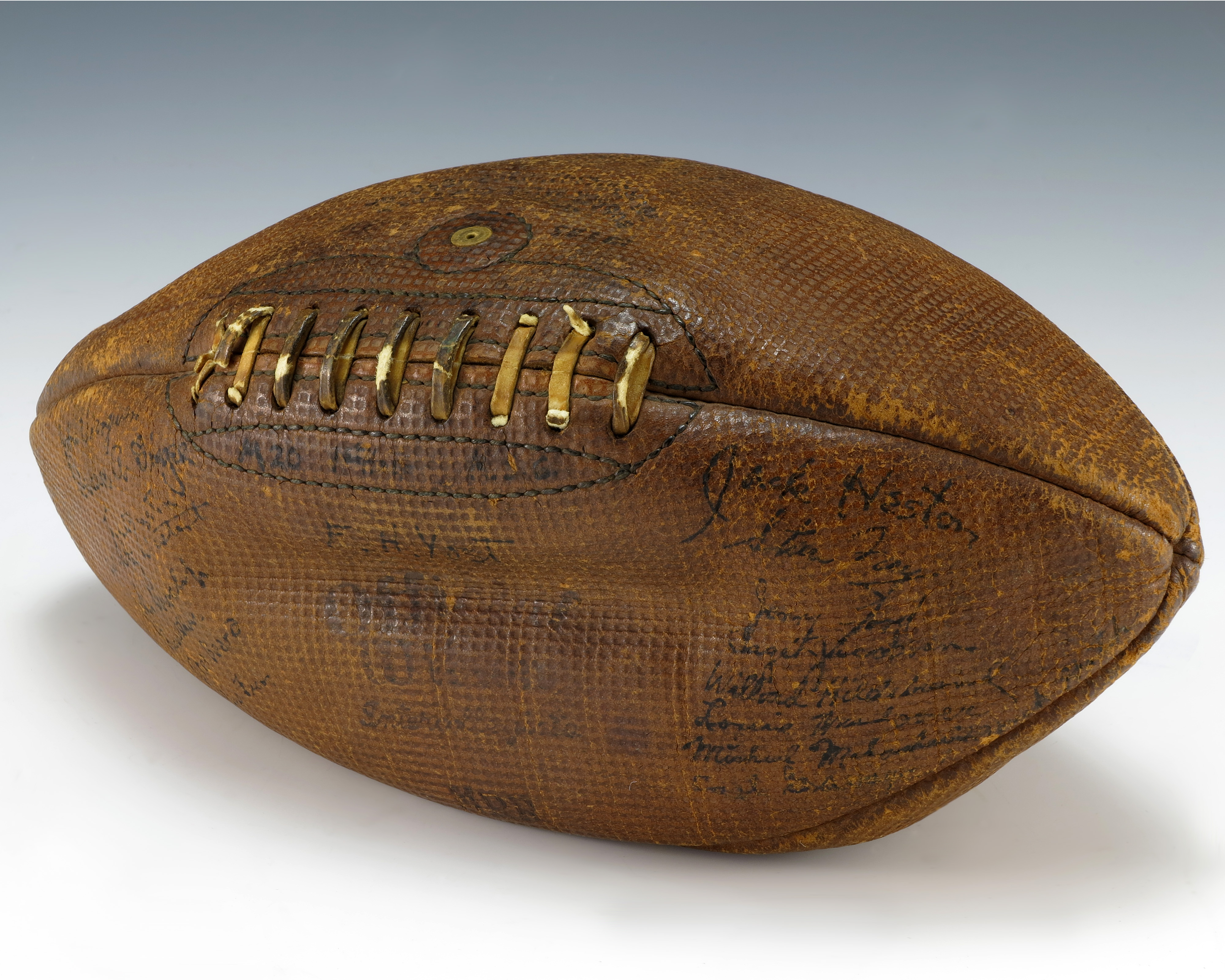
A leather football used in a 1932 college football game, signed by former U.S. president Gerald Ford

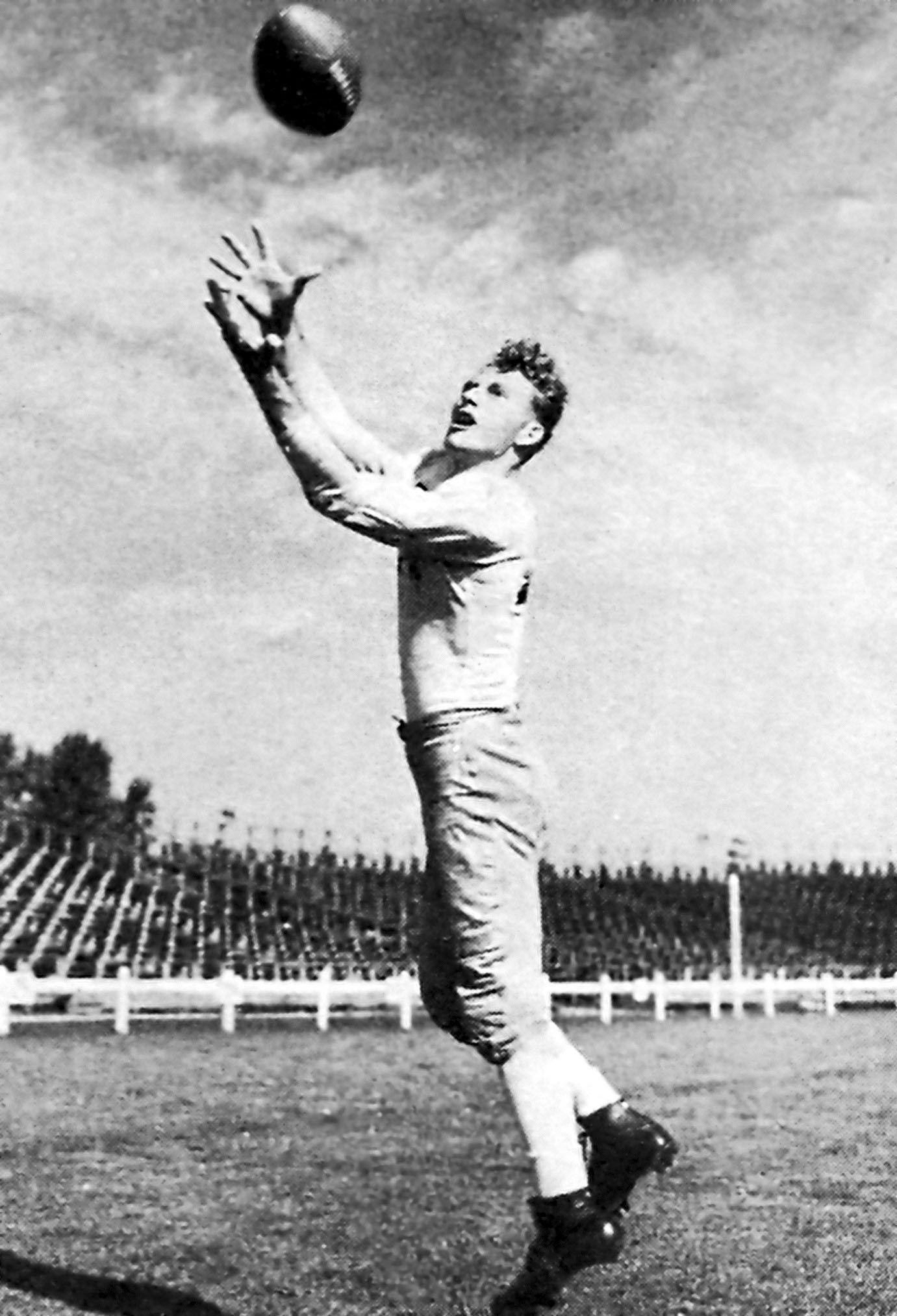
Don Hutson in 1940

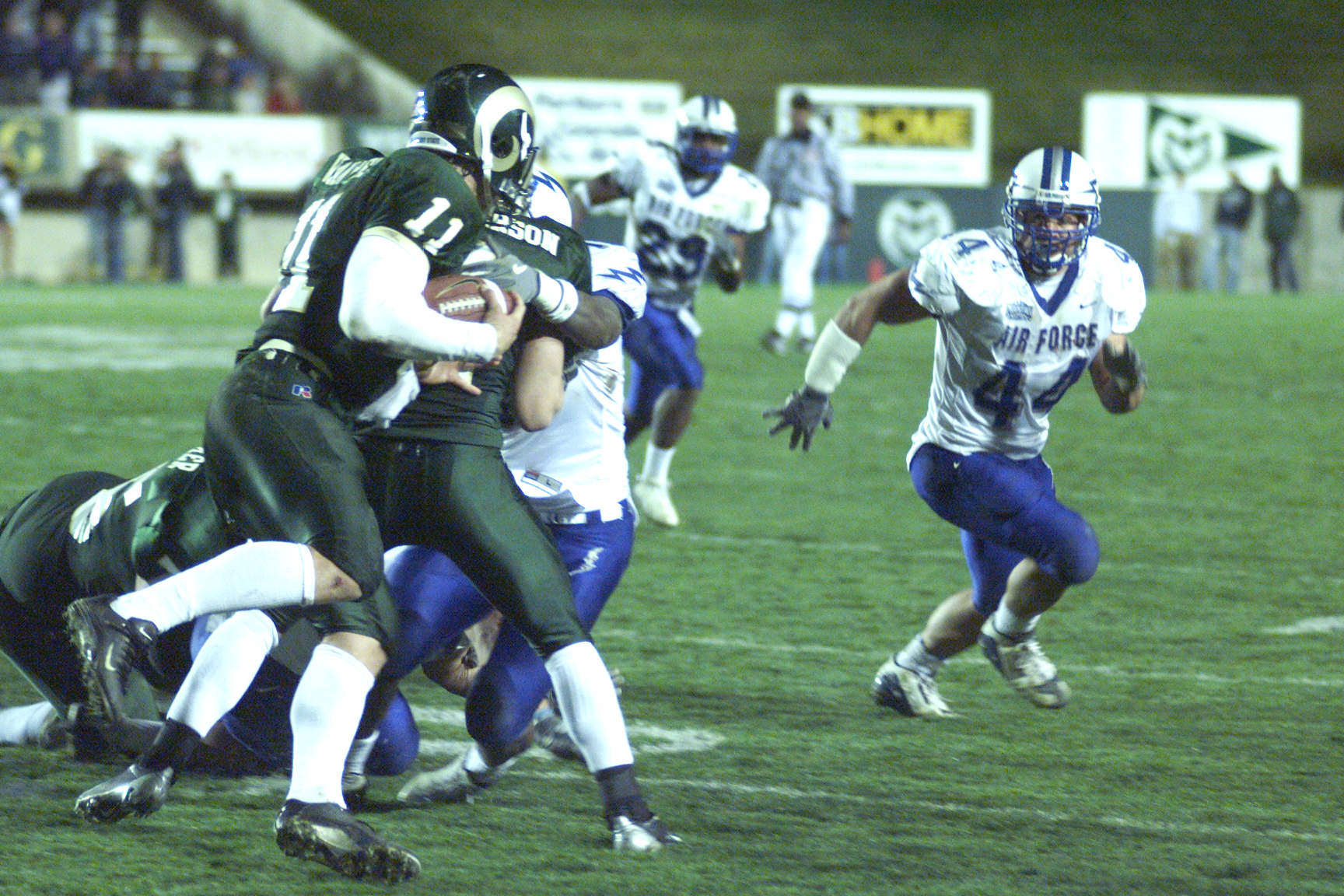
An October 2003 college football game between Colorado State (in green jerseys) and the Air Force Academy (in white jerseys)

In the early 1930s, the college game continued to grow, particularly in the South, bolstered by fierce rivalries such as the "South's Oldest Rivalry", between Virginia and North Carolina and the "Deep South's Oldest Rivalry", between Georgia and Auburn. Although before the mid-1920s most national powers came from the Northeast or the Midwest, the trend changed when several teams from the South and the West Coast achieved national success. Wallace William Wade's 1925 Alabama team won the 1926 Rose Bowl after receiving its first national title and William Alexander's 1928 Georgia Tech team defeated California in the 1929 Rose Bowl. College football quickly became the most popular spectator sport in the South.

Several major modern college football conferences rose to prominence during this time period. The Southwest Athletic Conference had been founded in 1915. Consisting mostly of schools from Texas, the conference saw back-to-back national champions with Texas Christian University (TCU) in 1938 and Texas A&M in 1939. The Pacific Coast Conference (PCC), a precursor to the contemporary Pac-12 Conference, had its own back-to-back champion in the University of Southern California which was awarded the title in 1931 and 1932. The Southeastern Conference (SEC) formed in 1932 and consisted mostly of schools in the Deep South. As in previous decades, the Big Ten continued to dominate in the 1930s and 1940s, with Minnesota winning 5 titles between 1934 and 1941, and Michigan (1933, 1947, and 1948) and Ohio State (1942) also winning titles.

As it grew beyond its regional affiliations in the 1930s, college football garnered increased national attention. Four new bowl games were created: the Orange Bowl, Sugar Bowl, the Sun Bowl in 1935, and the Cotton Bowl in 1937. In lieu of an actual national championship, these bowl games, along with the earlier Rose Bowl, provided a way to match up teams from distant regions of the country that did not otherwise play. In 1936, the Associated Press began its weekly poll of prominent sports writers, ranking all of the nation's college football teams. Since there was no national championship game, the final version of the AP poll was used to determine who was crowned the National Champion of college football.

The 1930s saw growth in the passing game. Though some coaches, such as General Robert Neyland at Tennessee, continued to eschew its use, several rules changes to the game had a profound effect on teams' ability to throw the ball. In 1934, the rules committee removed two major penalties—a loss of five yards for a second incomplete pass in any series of downs and a loss of possession for an incomplete pass in the end zone—and shrunk the circumference of the ball, making it easier to grip and throw. Players who became famous for taking advantage of the easier passing game included Alabama end Don Hutson and TCU passer "Slingin" Sammy Baugh.

In 1935, New York City's Downtown Athletic Club awarded the first Heisman Trophy to University of Chicago halfback Jay Berwanger, who was also the first ever NFL draft pick in 1936. The trophy was designed by sculptor Frank Eliscu and modeled after New York University player Ed Smith. The trophy recognizes the nation's "most outstanding" college football player and has become one of the most coveted awards in all of American sports.

NBC broadcast the first televised college football game ever, which was between Waynesburg and Fordham on September 30, 1939, on station W2XBS with one camera and Bill Stern was the sole announcer. Estimates are that the broadcast reached approximately 1,000 television sets.

College football on television continued with the second televised college game just one month later, on October 28, when the Kansas State Wildcats hosted the Nebraska Cornhuskers for their homecoming contest.

Prior to 1941, virtually all football players saw action on "both sides of the ball", playing in both offensive and defensive roles. From 1941 to 1952, the National Collegiate Athletic Association (NCAA) allowed unlimited substitution. This change was originally made because of the difficulty in fielding highly skilled players during the years of the Second World War, in which many able-bodied college-age men volunteered for or were drafted into military service. During World War II, college football players enlisted in the armed forces, some playing in Europe during the war. As most of these players had eligibility left on their college careers, some of them returned to college at West Point, bringing Army back-to-back national titles in 1944 and 1945 under coach Red Blaik. Doc Blanchard (known as "Mr. Inside") and Glenn Davis (known as "Mr. Outside") both won the Heisman Trophy, in 1945 and 1946 respectively. On the coaching staff of those 1944–1946 Army teams was future Pro Football Hall of Fame coach Vince Lombardi.

The 1950s saw the rise of yet more dynasties and power programs. Oklahoma, under coach Bud Wilkinson, won three national titles (1950, 1955, 1956) and all ten Big Eight Conference championships in the decade while building a record 47-game winning streak. Woody Hayes led Ohio State to two national titles, in 1954 and 1957, and dominated the Big Ten conference, winning three Big Ten titles—more than any other school. Wilkinson and Hayes, along with Robert Neyland of Tennessee, oversaw a revival of the running game in the 1950s. Passing numbers dropped from an average of 18.9 attempts in 1951 to 13.6 attempts in 1955, while teams averaged just shy of 50 running plays per game. Nine out of ten Heisman trophy winners in the 1950s were runners. Notre Dame, one of the biggest passing teams of the decade, saw a substantial decline in success; the 1950s were the only decade between 1920 and 1990 when the team did not win at least a share of the national title. Paul Hornung, Notre Dame quarterback, did, however, win the Heisman in 1956, becoming the only player from a losing team ever to do so.

In 1954, the NCAA emplaced a set of new rules ending free substitution, and thus requiring the use of the one-platoon system, primarily due to financial reasons. The system allowed only one player to be substituted between plays, which effectively put an end to the use of separate specialized units. Tennessee head coach General Robert Neyland praised the change as the end of "chickenshit football".

Following the enormous success of the National Football League's 1958 championship game, college football no longer enjoyed the same popularity as the NFL, at least on a national level. While both games benefited from the advent of television, since the late 1950s, the NFL has become a nationally popular sport while college football has maintained strong regional ties.

As professional football became a national television phenomenon, college football did as well. In the 1950s, Notre Dame, which had a large national following, formed its own network to broadcast its games, but by and large the sport still retained a mostly regional following. In 1952, the NCAA claimed all television broadcasting rights for the games of its member institutions, and it alone negotiated television rights. This situation continued until 1984, when several schools brought a suit under the Sherman Antitrust Act; the Supreme Court ruled against the NCAA and schools are now free to negotiate their own television deals. ABC Sports began broadcasting a national Game of the Week in 1966, bringing key matchups and rivalries to a national audience for the first time.

New formations and play sets continued to be developed. Emory Bellard, an assistant coach under Darrell Royal at the University of Texas, developed a three-back option style offense known as the wishbone. The wishbone is a run-heavy offense that depends on the quarterback making last second decisions on when and to whom to hand or pitch the ball to. Royal went on to teach the offense to other coaches, including Bear Bryant at Alabama, Chuck Fairbanks at Oklahoma and Pepper Rodgers at UCLA; who all adapted and developed it to their own tastes. The strategic opposite of the wishbone is the spread offense, developed by professional and college coaches throughout the 1960s and 1970s. Though some schools play a run-based version of the spread, its most common use is as a passing offense designed to "spread" the field both horizontally and vertically. Some teams have managed to adapt with the times to keep winning consistently. In the rankings of the most victorious programs, Michigan, Texas, and Notre Dame are ranked first, second, and third in total wins.

After the 1964 season, twelve years since the mandate requiring one-platoon, the NCAA repealed the rules enforcing its use and allowed an unlimited amount of player substitutions. This allowed, starting with the 1965 season, teams to form separate offensive and defensive units as well as "special teams" which would be employed in kicking situations. The reinstatement of the two-platoon system allowed players to become more specialized by focusing on a limited number of plays and skills related to their specific position. By the early 1970s, however, some university administrators, coaches and others were calling for a return to the days of one-platoon football.

The 1969 college football season was celebrated as the 100th anniversary of college football. Many schools, at the behest of the NCAA, commemorated the 1969 season by wearing a special decal on their football helmets. The decal consisted of the numeral "100" inside a football shaped outline. The decal was designed to commemorate the 1869 game between Rutgers and Princeton, often cited as the first college football game. Decals varied greatly from one team to another. Some teams placed the decals unobtrusively on the front or back of the helmet. Other teams placed them prominently on the side, either in addition to or in place of their regular team logo. Colors and design of the decals also varied greatly between teams; with different numeral styles and color schemes in use. One notable exception was Harvard, which abstained from the 1969 commemoration, and had its own special helmet decal made for the 1974 season, which commemorates an 1874 game that Harvard played against McGill that Harvard claims was the "real" first American football game.

=== Modern intercollegiate football (1970–present) ===
==== Growth of bowl games ====
Bowl Game Growth
| Year | # of games |
| 1930 | 1 |
| 1940 | 5 |
| 1950 | 8 |
| 1960 | 8 |
| 1970 | 8 |
| 1980 | 15 |
| 1990 | 19 |
| 2000 | 25 |
| 2010 | 35 |
| 2015 | 40 |

In 1940, for the highest level of college football, there were only five bowl games (Rose, Orange, Sugar, Sun, and Cotton). By 1950, three more had joined that number and in 1970, there were still only eight major college bowl games. The number grew to eleven in 1976. At the birth of cable television and cable sports networks like ESPN, there were fifteen bowls in 1980. With more national venues and increased available revenue, the bowls saw an explosive growth throughout the 1980s and 1990s. In the thirty years from 1950 to 1980, seven bowl games were added to the schedule. From 1980 to 2008, an additional 20 bowl games were added to the schedule. Some have criticized this growth, claiming that the increased number of games has diluted the significance of playing in a bowl game. Yet others have countered that the increased number of games has increased exposure and revenue for a greater number of schools, and see it as a positive development.

With the growth of bowl games, it became difficult to determine a national champion in a fair and equitable manner. As conferences became contractually bound to certain bowl games (a situation known as a tie-in), match-ups that guaranteed a consensus national champion became increasingly rare. In 1992, seven conferences and independent Notre Dame formed the Bowl Coalition, which attempted to arrange an annual No.1 versus No.2 matchup based on the final AP poll standings. The Coalition lasted for three years; however, several scheduling issues prevented much success; tie-ins still took precedence in several cases. For example, the Big Eight and SEC champions could never meet, since they were contractually bound to different bowl games. The coalition also excluded the Rose Bowl, arguably the most prestigious game in the nation, and two major conferences—the Pac-10 and Big Ten—meaning that it had limited success. In 1995, the Coalition was replaced by the Bowl Alliance, which reduced the number of bowl games to host a national championship game to three—the Fiesta, Sugar, and Orange Bowls—and the participating conferences to five—the ACC, SEC, Southwest, Big Eight, and Big East. It was agreed that the No.1 and No.2 ranked teams gave up their prior bowl tie-ins and were guaranteed to meet in the national championship game, which rotated between the three participating bowls. The system still did not include the Big Ten, Pac-10, or the Rose Bowl, and thus still lacked the legitimacy of a true national championship.

==== Bowl Championship Series (1998–2013) ====
In 1998, a new system was put into place called the Bowl Championship Series. For the first time, it included all major conferences (ACC, Big East, Big 12, Big Ten, Pac-10, and SEC) and all four major bowl games (Rose, Orange, Sugar and Fiesta). The champions of these six conferences, along with two "at-large" selections, were invited to play in the four bowl games. Each year, one of the four bowl games served as a national championship game. Also, a complex system of human polls, computer rankings, and strength of schedule calculations was instituted to rank schools. Based on this ranking system, the No.1 and No.2 teams met each year in the national championship game. Traditional tie-ins were maintained for schools and bowls not part of the national championship. For example, in years when not a part of the national championship, the Rose Bowl still hosted the Big Ten and Pac-10 champions.

The system continued to change, as the formula for ranking teams was tweaked from year to year. At-large teams could be chosen from any of the Division I conferences, though only one selection—Utah in 2005—came from a non-BCS affiliated conference. Starting with the 2006 season, a fifth game—simply called the BCS National Championship Game—was added to the schedule, to be played at the site of one of the four BCS bowl games on a rotating basis, one week after the regular bowl game. This opened up the BCS to two additional at-large teams. Also, rules were changed to add the champions of five additional conferences (Conference USA, the Mid-American Conference, the Mountain West Conference, the Sun Belt Conference and the Western Athletic Conference), provided that said champion ranked in the top twelve in the final BCS rankings, or was within the top 16 of the BCS rankings and ranked higher than the champion of at least one of the "BCS conferences" (also known as "AQ" conferences, for Automatic Qualifying). Several times since this rule change was implemented, schools from non-AQ conferences played in BCS bowl games. In 2009, Boise State played TCU in the Fiesta Bowl, the first time two schools from non-BCS conferences played each other in a BCS bowl game. The final team from the non-AQ ranks to reach a BCS bowl game was Northern Illinois in 2012, which played in (and lost) the 2013 Orange Bowl.

==== College Football Playoff (2014–present) ====
Due to the intensification of the college football playoff debate after nearly a decade of the sometimes disputable results of the BCS, the conference commissioners and Notre Dame's president voted to implement a postseason tournament to name a champion, which came to be called the College Football Playoff (CFP). CFP is the annual postseason tournament for the NCAA Division I Football Bowl Subdivision (FBS). Just as its predecessors, such a postseason tournament has failed to receive official sanctioning from the NCAA.

The CFP system is centered on six major bowl games played on or near New Year's Day, often called the "New Year's Six". Three pairs of games rotate annually as hosts of CFP semifinals. The champions of the so-called Power Five conferences (ACC, Big Ten, Big 12, Pac-12, SEC) all receive guaranteed berths in one of the New Year's Six games, though not necessarily in the CFP semifinals. Notre Dame, a football independent but otherwise an ACC member, has its own arrangement for access to the New Year's Six should it meet specified criteria. A selection committee similar to those used by the NCAA basketball tournaments for men and women releases a weekly ranking concurrently with the AP Poll starting with the Monday after Week 10 of the season. After the completion of the regular season, the committee selects the four teams that will compete in the CFP semifinals and the at-large entries to the New Year's Six games. One of the at-large entries is reserved for the top-ranking champion of the so-called "Group of Five" conferences (American, Conference USA, MAC, Mountain West, Sun Belt). The semifinal winners advance to the College Football Playoff National Championship game. The first season of the new system was not without controversy, however, after TCU and Baylor (each with only one loss) both failed to receive the support of the College Football Playoff selection committee.

The CFP was expanded to 12 teams as of the 2024 NCAA Division I FBS football season.

== Modern history of professional football (1933–present) ==
=== Professional football (1933–1969) ===
==== Stability and growth of the NFL (1933–1957) ====
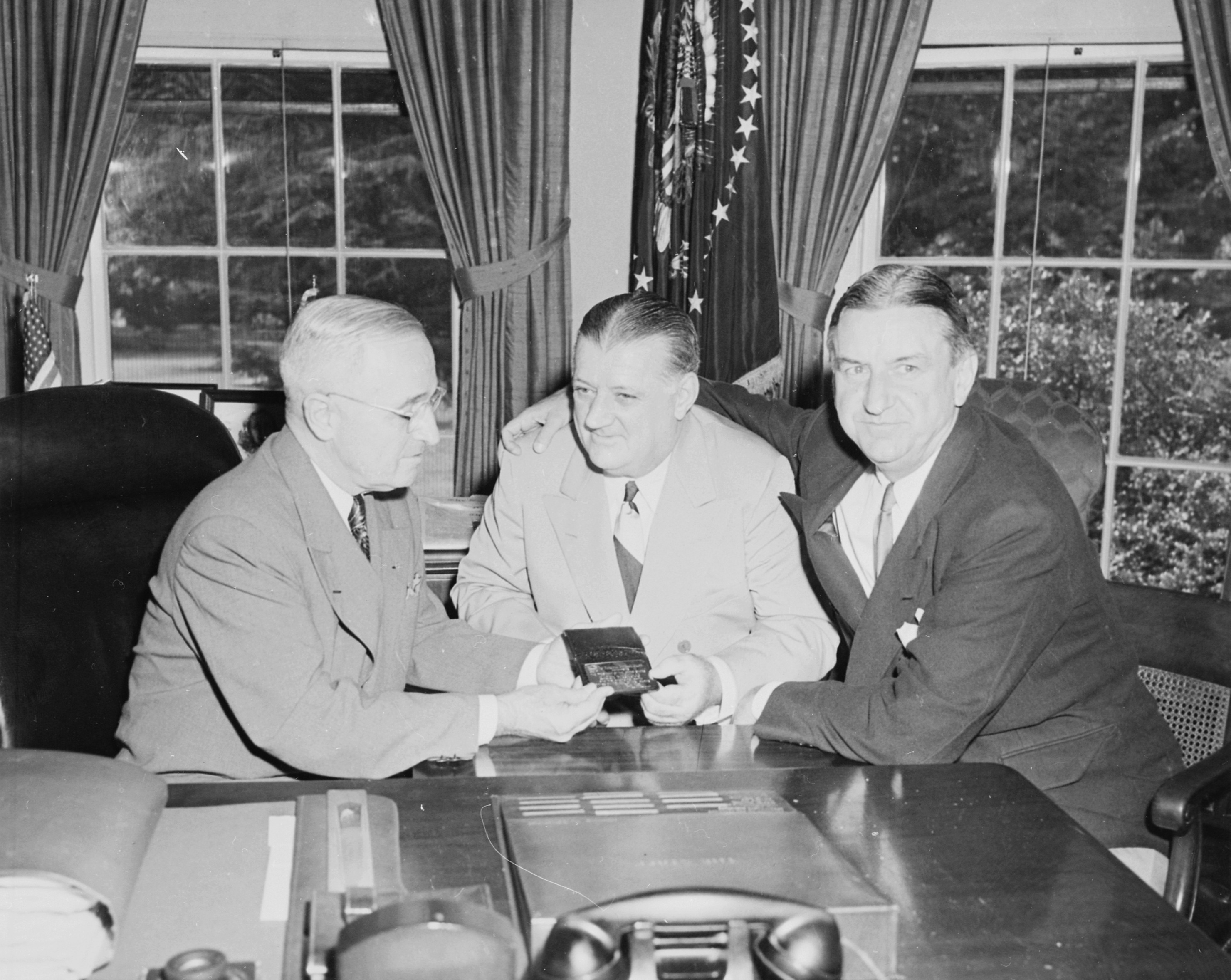
George Preston Marshall (right) and National Football League Commissioner Bert Bell (center) with President Harry S. Truman at the White House in September 1949

The 1930s represented an important time of transition for the NFL. League membership was fluid prior to the mid-1930s. 1936 was the first year where there were no franchise moves, prior to that year 51 teams had gone defunct. Also in 1936, the NFL instituted the first draft of college players. With the first ever draft selection, the Philadelphia Eagles picked Heisman Trophy winner Jay Berwanger, but he declined to play professionally. Also in that year, another AFL formed, but it also lasted only two seasons.

An NFL game was televised for the first time when NBC broadcast the October 22, 1939 Philadelphia Eagles at Brooklyn Dodgers game at Ebbets Field in Brooklyn (the Dodgers won 23-14). The experimental broadcast was broadcast only to viewers in New York and Albany; regular broadcasting of NFL games would not begin until 1951.

The football, itself, changed in 1934, with a rule change that tapered the ball at the ends more and reduced the size around the middle. This new, sleeker ball made it much easier to handle, particularly for passers.

In 1933, the last year of integration, the NFL had two black players, Joe Lillard and Ray Kemp. Both were gone by the end of the season: Lillard, due largely to his tendency to get into fights, was not invited back to the Chicago Cardinals despite in 1933 being responsible for almost half of the Cardinals' points, while Kemp quit on his own accord to pursue a coaching career (one that turned out to be long and successful). Many observers will attribute the subsequent lockout of black players to the entry of George Preston Marshall into the league in 1932. Marshall openly refused to have black athletes on his Boston Braves/Washington Redskins team, and reportedly pressured the rest of the league to follow suit. Marshall, however, was likely not the only reason: the Great Depression had stoked an increase in racism and self-inflicted segregation across the country, and internal politics likely had as much of an effect as external pressure. Marshall's hostility was specifically directed at the black race; he openly allowed (and promoted) Native Americans on his team, including his first head coach, Lone Star Dietz, widely believed to be a Native American at the time. The choice of Redskins as his team name in 1933 was in part to maintain the native connotations that came with the previous team's name, the Boston Braves. Another reason for Marshall's anti-black sentiment was to curry favor in the Southern United States; Marshall's Redskins had a strong following in that part of the country, which he vigorously defended, and he stood up against the NFL's efforts to put expansion teams in the South until Clint Murchison Jr.'s extortion attempt as he acquired the rights to the Hail to the Redskins, their fight song, and threatened not to let Marshall use it unless he got an expansion team in Dallas, leading to the establishment of the Dallas Cowboys in 1960. By 1934, there were no more black players in the league. The NFL did not have another black player until after World War II.

In 1941, the NFL named its first Commissioner, Elmer Layden. The new office replaced that of President. Layden held the job for five years, before being replaced by Pittsburgh Steelers co-owner Bert Bell in 1946.

During World War II, a player shortage led to a shrinking of the league as several teams folded and others merged. Among the short-lived merged teams were the Steagles (Pittsburgh and Philadelphia) in 1943, the Card-Pitts (Chicago Cardinals and Pittsburgh) in 1944, and a team formed from the merger of the Brooklyn Dodgers and the Boston Yanks in 1945.

1946 was an important year in the history of professional football, as that was the year when the NFL reintegrated. The Los Angeles Rams signed two African American players, Kenny Washington and Woody Strode. Also that year, a competing league, the All-America Football Conference (AAFC), began operation.

During the 1950s, additional teams entered the league. In 1950, the AAFC folded, and three teams from that league were absorbed into the NFL: the Cleveland Browns (who had won the AAFC Championship every year of the league's existence), the San Francisco 49ers, and the Baltimore Colts (not the same as the modern franchise, this version folded after one year). The remaining players were chosen by the now 13 NFL teams in a dispersal draft. Also in 1950, the Los Angeles Rams became the first team to televise its entire schedule, marking the beginning of an important relationship between television and professional football. In 1952, the Dallas Texans went defunct, becoming the last NFL franchise to do so. The following year a new Baltimore Colts franchise formed to take over the assets of the Texans. The players' union, known as the NFL Players Association, formed in 1956.

==== The Greatest Game Ever Played (1958) ====
At the conclusion of the 1958 NFL season, the Baltimore Colts and the New York Giants met at Yankee Stadium to determine the league champion. Tied after 60 minutes of play, it became the first NFL game to go into sudden death overtime. The final score was Baltimore Colts 23, New York Giants 17. The game has since become widely known as "the Greatest Game Ever Played". It was carried live on the NBC television network, and the national exposure it provided the league has been cited as a watershed moment in professional football history, helping propel the NFL to become one of the most popular sports leagues in the United States. Journalist Tex Maule said of the contest, "This, for the first time, was a truly epic game which inflamed the imagination of a national audience."

==== American Football League, merger and Vince Lombardi (1959–1969) ====
In 1959, longtime NFL commissioner Bert Bell died of a heart attack while attending an Eagles/Steelers game at Franklin Field. That same year, Dallas, Texas businessman Lamar Hunt led the formation of the rival American Football League, the fourth such league to bear that name, with war hero and former South Dakota Governor Joe Foss as its Commissioner. Unlike the earlier rival leagues, and bolstered by television exposure, the AFL posed a significant threat to NFL dominance of the professional football world. In 1960, the AFL began play with eight teams and a double round-robin schedule of fourteen games. New NFL commissioner Pete Rozelle took office the same year. The AFL generally avoided placing teams in markets where they directly competed with established NFL franchises. Although four inaugural AFL teams shared markets with NFL teams—the Dallas Texans, Los Angeles Chargers, Titans of New York, and Oakland Raiders (the latter sharing the San Francisco Bay Area with the San Francisco 49ers)—only the franchises in New York (renamed the New York Jets) and Oakland remained in direct competition with NFL teams after the league's early years. The Chargers moved to San Diego after the 1960 season and the Texans moved to Kansas City after the 1962 season, becoming the Chiefs.

When Chuck Bednarik retired from playing linebacker and center for the Philadelphia Eagles in 1962, he became professional football's last full-time two-way player. After his retirement, Bednarik became an outspoken critic of the modern football player's lack of stamina under free substitution.

The AFL was able to become a viable alternative to the NFL as it made a concerted effort to attract established talent away from the NFL, signing half of the NFL's first-round draft choices in 1960. The AFL worked hard to secure top college players, many from sources virtually untapped by the established league: small colleges and predominantly black colleges. Two of the eight coaches of the Original Eight AFL franchises, Hank Stram (Texans/Chiefs) and Sid Gillman (Chargers) eventually were inducted to the Hall of Fame. Led by Oakland Raiders owner and AFL commissioner Al Davis, the AFL established a "war chest" to entice top talent with higher pay than they got from the NFL. Former Green Bay Packers quarterback Babe Parilli became a star for the Boston Patriots during the early years of the AFL, and University of Alabama passer Joe Namath rejected the NFL to play for the New York Jets. Namath became the face of the league as it reached its height of popularity in the mid-1960s. Davis's methods worked, and in 1966, the junior league forced a partial merger with the NFL. The two leagues agreed to have a common draft and play in a common season-ending championship game, known as the AFL-NFL World Championship. Two years later, the game's name was changed to the Super Bowl. AFL teams won the next two Super Bowls, and in 1970, the two leagues merged to form a new 26-team league. The resulting newly expanded NFL eventually incorporated some of the innovations that led to the AFL's success, such as including names on player's jerseys, official scoreboard clocks, national television contracts (the addition of Monday Night Football gave the NFL broadcast rights on all of the Big Three television networks), and sharing of gate and broadcasting revenues between home and visiting teams.

The Washington Redskins had no black players until Interior Secretary Stewart Udall threatened to evict them from D. C. Stadium unless they signed a black player. The Redskins first attempted to comply by drafting Ernie Davis, who refused to play under Marshall; the Redskins in turn traded Davis to the Cleveland Browns. The Redskins eventually signed Bobby Mitchell and two other African American players by 1962, thus making them the last major professional football team in America to integrate.

Vince Lombardi led the Green Bay Packers as both head coach and general manager during the 1960s, where his efforts led the team to three straight and five total National Football League championships in seven years, in addition to winning the first two Super Bowls following the 1966 and 1967 NFL seasons. Lombardi is considered by many to be one of the best and most successful coaches in Professional Football history. In 1960, even though color barrier still existed in the NFL, as the Redskins at that time still refused to play black players, Jack Vainisi, the Scouting Director for the Packers, and Lombardi were determined "to ignore the prejudices then prevalent in most NFL front offices in their search for the most talented players." Lombardi explained his views by saying that he "... viewed his players as neither black nor white, but Packer green". Among professional football head coaches, Lombardi's view on discrimination was not de rigueur in the midst of the civil rights movement. An interracial relationship between one of the Packer rookies and a young woman was brought to the attention of Lombardi by Packer veterans in his first training camp in Green Bay. The next day at training camp, Lombardi, who had a zero tolerance policy towards racism, responded by warning his team that if any player exhibited prejudice, in any manner, then that player would be thrown off the team. Lombardi, who was vehemently opposed to Jim Crow discrimination, let it be known to all Green Bay establishments that if they did not accommodate his black players equally as well as his white players, then that business would be off-limits to the entire team. Before the start of the 1960 regular season, he instituted a policy that the Packers would only lodge in places that accepted all his players. In the all-white Oneida Golf and Riding Country club in Green Bay, of which Lombardi was a member, Lombardi demanded that he should be allowed to choose a Native American caddie, even if white caddies were available. Lombardi's view on racial matters was a result of his religious faith and the prejudice he had experienced as an Italian-American. While Lombardi was known to treat his players roughly in practices and during games, he insisted on unconditional respect for gay players and front office staff. Demanding "Nothing But Acceptance" from players and coaches toward all people, Lombardi would fire a coach or release a player should they insult the sexual orientation of anyone. In Washington, Lombardi's assistant general manager, David Slatterly, was gay, as was PR director Joe Blair, who was described as Lombardi's "right-hand man." According to son Vince Lombardi, Jr., "He saw everyone as equals, and I think having a gay brother (Hal) was a big factor in his approach ... I think my father would've felt, 'I hope I've created an atmosphere in the locker room where this would not be an issue at all. And if you do have an issue, the problem will be yours because my locker room will tolerate nothing but acceptance.'" Upon his arrival in Washington, Lombardi was aware of tight end Jerry Smith's sexual orientation. "Lombardi protected and loved Jerry", said former teammate Dave Kopay. Lombardi brought Smith into his office and told him that his sexual orientation would never be an issue as long as he was coaching the Redskins; Smith would be judged solely on his on-the-field performance and contribution to the team's success. Under Lombardi's leadership Smith flourished, becoming an integral part of Lombardi's offense, and was voted a First Team All-Pro for the first time in his career, which was also Lombardi's only season as Redskin head coach. Lombardi invited other gay players to training camp, and would privately hope they would prove they could earn a spot on the team. At the Washington Redskins training camp in 1969, Ray McDonald was a gay player, with sub-par skills, who was trying to make the Redskin roster again, but this time with Lombardi as the Redskins' new head coach. True to his word, Lombardi told running back coach, George Dickson, 'I want you to get on McDonald and work on him and work on him – and if I hear one of you people make reference to his manhood, you'll be out of here before your ass hits the ground.'. The National Football League's Super Bowl trophy is named in Lombardi's honor after he unexpectedly died in 1970 of cancer. He was enshrined in the Pro Football Hall of Fame in 1971.

=== Professional football (1970–present) ===
==== Post-merger NFL ====
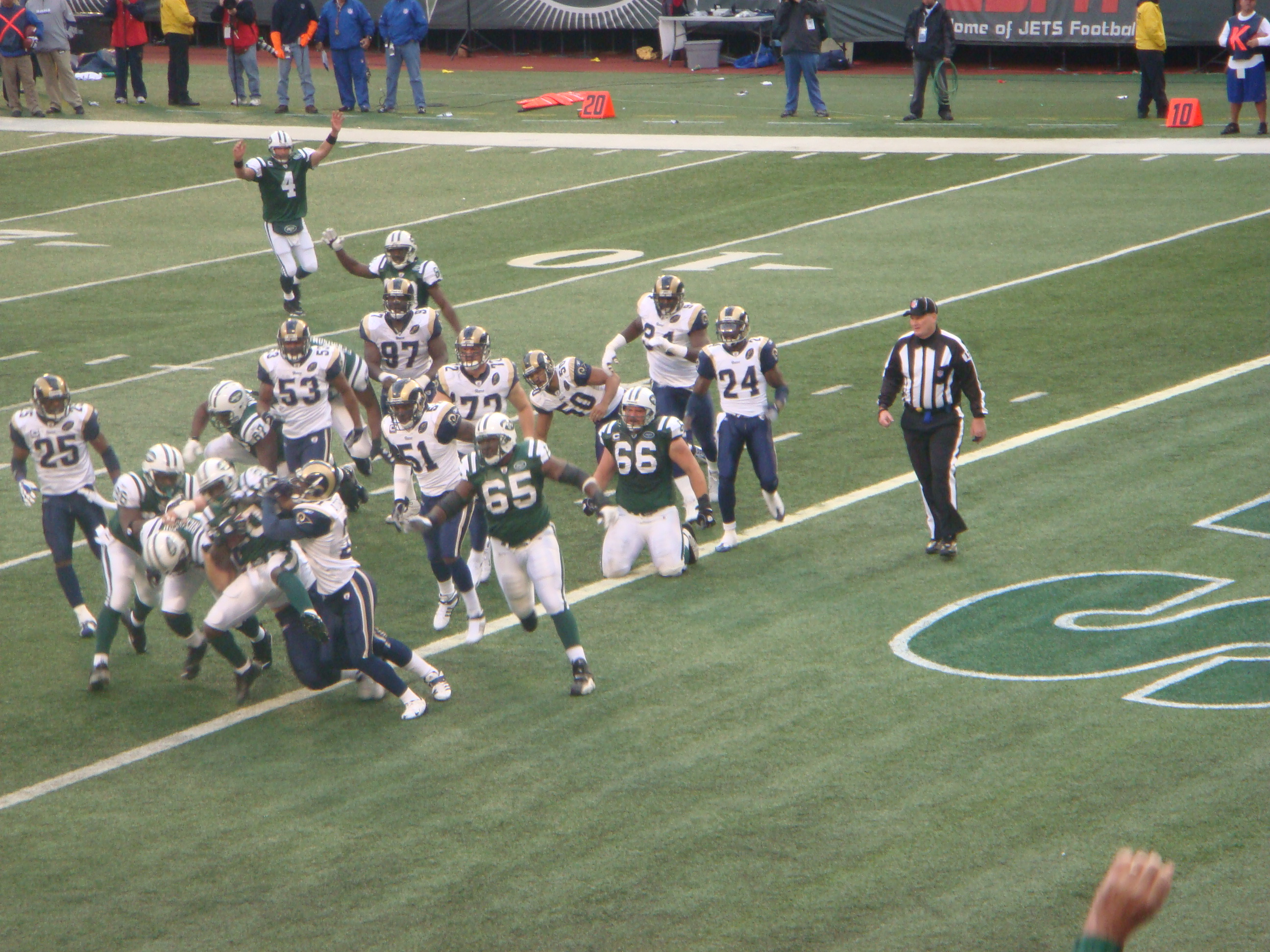
Thomas Jones, a running back for the New York Jets, scores a touchdown against the St. Louis Rams in week 10 of the 2008 NFL season

The NFL continued to grow, eventually adopting some innovations of the AFL, including the two-point conversion in 1994. It has expanded several times to its current 32-team membership, and the Super Bowl has become a cultural phenomena across the United States. One of the most popular televised events annually in the United States, it has become a major source of advertising revenue for the television networks that have carried it and it serves as a means for advertisers to debut elaborate and expensive commercials for their products. The NFL has grown to become the most popular spectator sports league in the United States.

One of the things that have marked the modern NFL as different from other major professional sports leagues is the apparent parity between its 32 teams. While from time to time, dominant teams have arisen, the league has been cited as one of the few where every team has a realistic chance of winning the championship from year to year. The league's complex labor agreement with its players' union, which mandates a hard salary cap and revenue sharing between its clubs, prevents the richest teams from stockpiling the best players and gives even teams in smaller cities such as Green Bay and New Orleans the opportunity to compete for the Super Bowl. One of the chief architects of this labor agreement was former NFL commissioner Paul Tagliabue, who presided over the league from 1989 to 2006. In addition to providing parity between the clubs, the current labor contract, established in 1993 and renewed in 1998 and 2006, has kept player salaries low—the lowest among the four major league sports in the United States— and has helped make the NFL the only major American professional sports league since 1993 not to suffer any player strike or work stoppage. In 1994, Paul Tagliabue approved the creation of the Mild Traumatic Brain Injury (MTBI) Committee with the stated goal of studying the effects of concussions and sub-concussive injury in NFL players. Tagliabue appointed rheumatologist Dr. Elliot Pellman to chair the committee. Pellman's appointment was met with harsh criticism, because he is not a neurologist or neuropsychologist and often admitted ignorance about head injuries.

Since taking over as commissioner before the 2006 season, Roger Goodell has made player conduct a priority of his office. Since taking office, several high-profile players have experienced trouble with the law, from Adam "Pacman" Jones to Michael Vick. In these and other cases, Commissioner Goodell has mandated lengthy suspensions for players who fall outside of acceptable conduct limits. Goodell, however, has remained a largely unpopular figure to many of the league's fans, who perceive him attempting to change the NFL's identity and haphazardly damage the sport.

In 2010, the NFL finally acknowledged that many of its ex-players were suffering from chronic traumatic encephalopathy (CTE). In 2013 a book written by ESPN reporters Mark Fainaru-Wada and Steve Fainaru, which was initially broadcast as a documentary film, was made about traumatic brain injury in the National Football League (NFL), particularly concussions and chronic traumatic encephalopathy (CTE). The documentary, entitled League of Denial: The NFL's Concussion Crisis, was produced by Frontline and broadcast on PBS. The book and film, both devote significant attention to the story of Mike Webster and his football-related brain injuries, and the pathologist who examined Webster's brain, Bennet Omalu. The film also looks closely at the efforts of researchers led by Ann McKee at Boston University's Center for the Study of Traumatic Encephalopathy, where the brains of a number of former NFL athletes have been examined. On September 30, 2014, it was announced that 76 of the 79 brains of former NFL players studied by Dr. Ann McKee and her colleagues tested positive for CTE. The study conducted was the largest brain bank study to date and was a twofold increase in the number of confirmed cases of CTE. Playing American football continues to have deadly consequences with 92 players dying between 2005 and 2014, including 8 deaths in 2013, 11 in 2014 and 11 in 2015 as of November 2015.

==== Other professional leagues ====
Minor professional leagues such as the original United Football League, Atlantic Coast Football League, Texas Football League, Seaboard Football League and Continental Football League existed in abundance in the 1960s and early 1970s, to varying degrees of success.

Several other professional football leagues have been formed since the AFL–NFL merger, though none have had the success of the AFL. In 1974, the World Football League formed and was able to attract such stars as Larry Csonka away from the NFL with lucrative contracts. However, most of the WFL franchises were insolvent and the league folded in 1975; the Memphis Southmen, the team that had signed Csonka and the most financially stable of the teams, unsuccessfully sued to join the NFL. The American Football Association formed as a continuation of the WFL's legacy in 1978, albeit on a much lower pay scale. That league lasted until 1982.

In 1970, Patricia Palinkas became the first woman to ever play on a men's semipro football team when she joined the Orlando Panthers. In 1974, the National Women's Football League was founded, starting play with 7 teams. By the mid-1970s, the average NWFL franchise entry fee was $10,000. The Toledo Troopers had a record from 1971 through 1976 of 39 wins, 1 loss and 1 tie, but folded in 1980 due to financial problems. The NWFL took a year off to restructure in 1987, but by the next year the league had split in two, with the remnants of the NWFL based in Toledo and the new Women's Tackle Football Association based in Grand Rapids, Michigan.

In 1982, the United States Football League formed as a spring league, and enjoyed moderate success during its first two seasons behind such stars as Jim Kelly and Herschel Walker. It intended to move its schedule to the fall in 1986, and tried to compete with the NFL directly, but despite winning an anti-trust suit against the older league the USFL was only awarded token damages, depriving the league of the funds it needed to stay solvent. The USFL ceased operations a month before its first fall season was to begin.

The NFL founded a developmental league known as the World League of American Football with teams based in the United States, Canada, and Europe. The WLAF ran for two years, from 1991 to 1992. The league went on a two-year hiatus before reorganizing as NFL Europe in 1995, with teams only in European cities. The name of the league was changed to NFL Europa in 2006. After the 2007 season, the NFL announced that it was closing down the league to focus its international marketing efforts in other ways, such as playing NFL regular season games in cities outside of the U.S.

Short-lived leagues such as the Regional Football League and Spring Football League formed in the wake of the dot-com boom but evaporated in short order after the boom ended.

In 2001, the XFL was formed as a joint venture between the World Wrestling Federation and the NBC television network. It folded after one season in the face of rapidly declining fan interest and a poor reputation. However, XFL stars such as Tommy Maddox and Rod "He Hate Me" Smart later saw success in the NFL.

The United Football League was a four-team fully professional league which played its first season in October–November 2009. Involved in this league were Mark Cuban, media mogul and owner of the National Basketball Association's Dallas Mavericks and William Hambrecht, a prominent Wall Street investor. The UFL was beset with numerous financial problems, some of which stemmed from the inability to sell television rights, insufficient ticket revenue and insurmountable expenses. Midway through its fourth season, the league abruptly shut down, after which several dozen former players and coaches sued to recover unpaid salaries; all remaining teams had folded and shut down their offices by March, 2013.

The Stars Football League played three seasons as a marginally professional league from 2011 to 2013, with its last two seasons restricted entirely to the state of Florida. The Fall Experimental Football League, an explicitly minor league, played two short seasons in 2014 and 2015.

== Modern history of youth and high school football (1933–present) ==
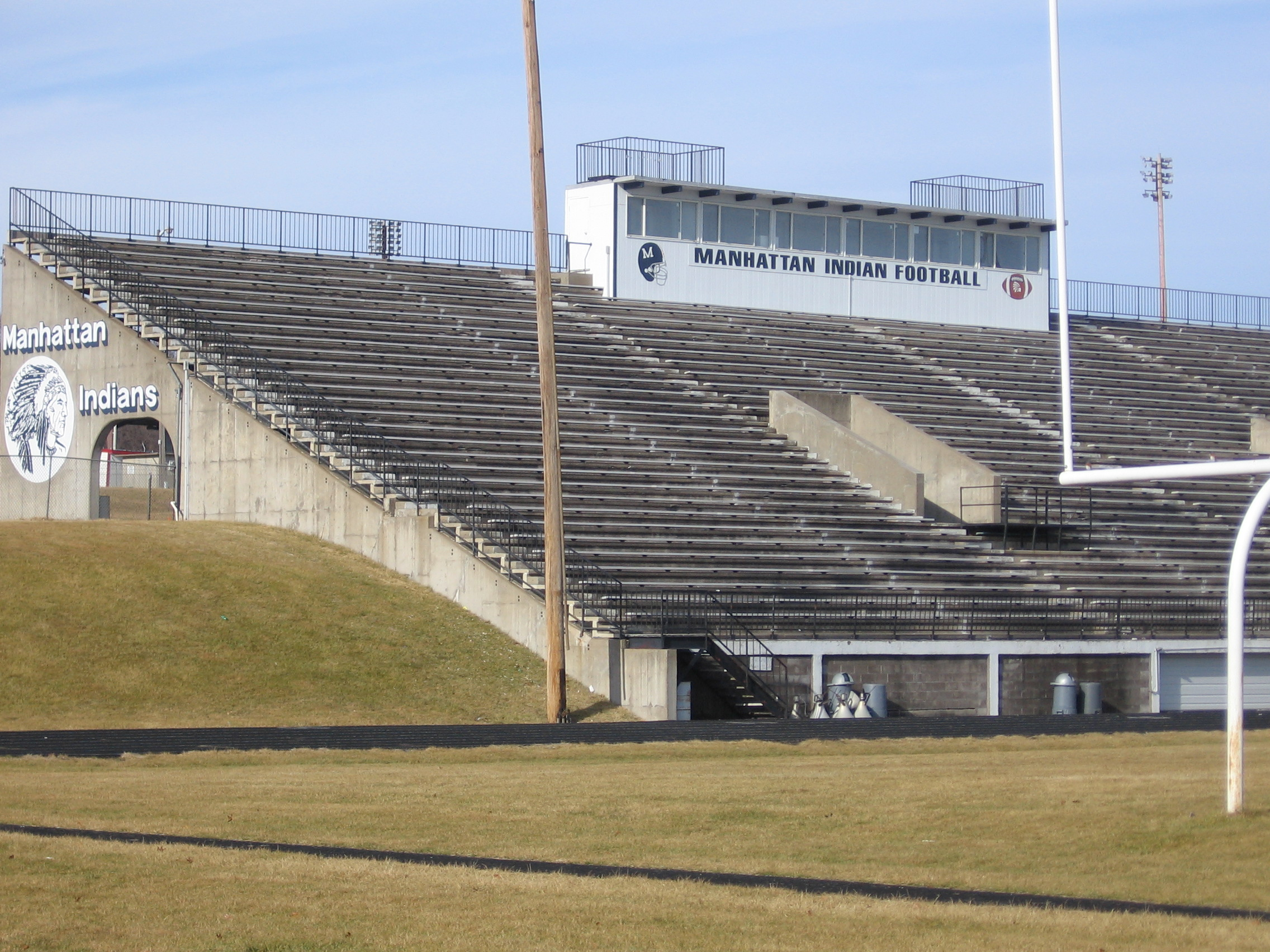
A high school football stadium in Manhattan, Kansas

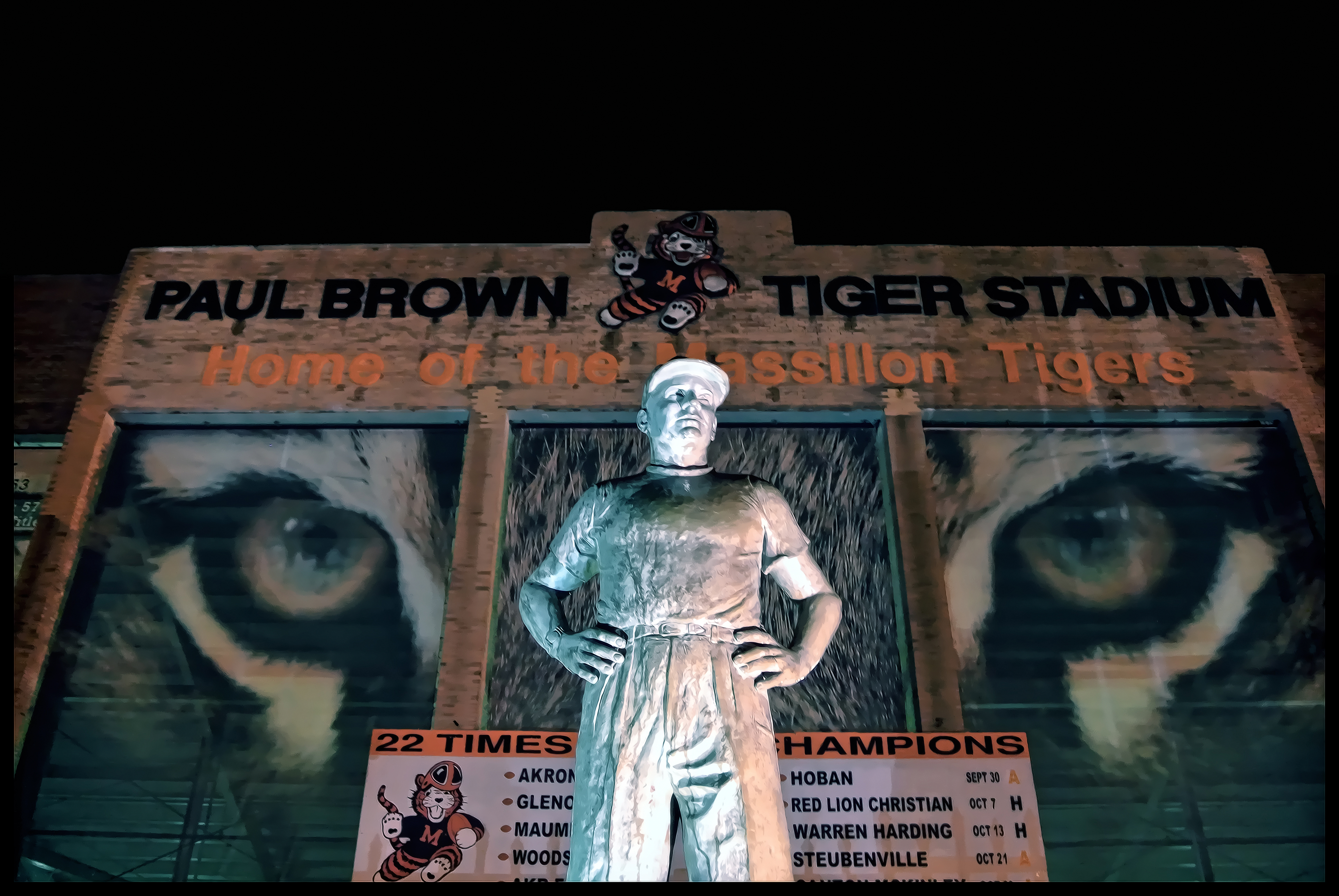
Paul Brown convinced Massillon Washington High School in Massillon, Ohio to build a new and bigger football stadium for the team; completed in 1939, the facility is named Paul Brown Tiger Stadium in his honor.

American has become a popular participatory sport among youth. One of the earliest youth football organizations was founded in Philadelphia, in 1929, as the Junior Football Conference. Organizer Joe Tomlin started the league to provide activities and guidance for teenage boys who were vandalizing the factory he owned. The original four-team league expanded to sixteen teams in 1933 when Pop Warner, who had just been hired as the new coach of the Temple University football team, agreed to give a lecture to the boys in the league. In his honor, the league was renamed the Pop Warner Conference.

Today, Pop Warner Little Scholars, as the program is now known, enrolls over 300,000 young boys and girls ages 5–16 in over 5000 football and cheerleading squads, and has affiliate programs in Mexico and Japan. Other organizations, such as the Police Athletic League, Upward, and the National Football League's NFL Youth Football Program also manage various youth football leagues.

American football is a popular sport for high schools in the United States. The National Federation of State High School Associations (NFHS) was founded in 1920 as an umbrella organization for state-level organizations that manage high school sports, including high school football. The NFHS publishes the rules followed by most local high school football associations. More than 13,000 high schools participate in football, and in some places high school teams play in stadiums that rival college-level facilities. In Denton, Texas, for example, a 12,000 seat, $21,000,000 stadium hosts two local high school football teams. The growth of high school football and its impact on small town communities has been documented by landmark non-fiction works such as the 1990 book Friday Night Lights and the subsequent fictionalized film and television series.

In 1932, when future Ohio State, Cleveland Browns and Cincinnati Bengals coach Paul Brown was 24 years old and barely two years out of college, he returned to be the head coach at his alma mater, Massillon Washington High School in Massillon, Ohio. His assignment was to turn around a Tigers team that had fallen into mediocrity over the six seasons since the departure of Dave Stewart, Brown's old coach. During his nine years at Massillon, Brown invented the playbook, a detailed listing of formations and set plays, and tested his players on their knowledge of it. He also originated the practice of sending in plays to his quarterback from the sideline using hand signals. His overall record at the school was 80–8–2, including a 35-game winning streak. Between 1935 and 1940, the team won the state football championship six times and won the High School Football National Championship four times, outscoring opponents by 2,393 points to 168 over that span. After the early losses to archrival Canton McKinley High School, the Tigers beat the Bulldogs six straight times. The Massillon Tigers are historically the second winningest high school football team in the United States having compiled a current record of 849 wins, 277 losses, and 36 ties as of the end of the 2014 season. Along with the Canton McKinley High School Bulldogs, the Tigers represent one half of what many consider to be the greatest high school football rivalry in the nation. It is the only high school contest in America to feature odds in Las Vegas. In 125 meetings (1894–2014), Massillon leads the series 68-52-5. Massillon and their fierce rivalry with Canton are subjects of the 2001 documentary film Go Tigers!. A total of 23 professional players, 3 NFL coaches and 14 collegiate all-Americans have graduated from Massillon High School.

Valdosta High School in Valdosta, Georgia is home to the winningest high school football program in the United States with a record 893 wins, 217 losses, and 34 ties, for a winning percentage of .791% as of November 14, 2014. From 1913 to 2010, the Wildcats have won 6 national championships in football, 24 state championships, and 41 regional championships.

== Modern history of American football outside the United States (1933–present) ==
After American football was played at the 1932 Summer Olympics, the Los Angeles Times wrote:

It remained for a spectacle listed on the program as 'American Football' to provide the Tenth Olympiad with its greatest thrill to date. Chances are the game will become an international pastime before the memory of this night game dies away.

However, this prediction was wrong because this sport didn't become popular outside the US. The sport in some ways did accelerate in popularity after World War II, especially in countries with large numbers of U.S. military personnel, who often formed a substantial proportion of the players and spectators. After World War II a four-team tournament between NATO allies on the west coast of Italy was played.

By 1998, the International Federation of American Football (IFAF), was formed to coordinate international amateur competition. At present, 45 associations from the Americas, Europe, Asia and Oceania are organized within the IFAF, which claims to represent 23 million amateur athletes. Until 2007, Japan dominated amateur American football outside of the US. The Japanese national team won the first two world cups—hosted by Italy in 1999 and Germany in 2003—defeating Mexico in the play-off on both occasions. Japan had never lost a game until it went down at home, 23–20, to the US Amateur Team in the final of the 2007 World Cup.

American football was a demonstration sport at the 2005 World Games in Duisburg, Germany. Germany beat Sweden 20 to 6 in the final.

The IFAF Women's World Championship was first held in 2010, in Stockholm, Sweden, with six countries competing. The United States beat Canada 66 to 0 in the final.

A long-term goal of the IFAF is for American football to be accepted by the International Olympic Committee as an Olympic sport. The only time that the sport was played was at the 1932 Summer Olympics in Los Angeles, but as a demonstration sport. Among the various problems the IFAF has to solve in order to be accepted by the IOC are building a competitive women's division, expanding the sport into Africa, and overcoming the current worldwide competitive imbalance that is in favor of American teams.

=== Mexico ===
American football has been played in Mexico since the early 1920s, and is a strong minority sport at Mexican colleges and universities, mainly in Mexico City. Over successive decades, more universities and colleges joined the championship, and four categories, called fuerzas, were created. The First Fuerza became the National League in 1970. In 1978, this was reorganized under the name Organización Nacional Estudiantil de Fútbol Americano (ONEFA). The largest crowd in NFL history was recorded at the American Bowl game at Mexico City on August 15, 1994, when 112,376 people attended the Governor's Cup game between the Dallas Cowboys and Houston Oilers. In 1996 the American Bowl was played in Monterrey at the Estadio Universitario. The first regular season NFL game played outside the United States was held on October 2, 2005, at Estadio Azteca in Mexico City before an NFL regular-season record of 103,467 fans.

=== Japan ===
The Japan American Football Association was founded by educator and Anglican Church in Japan lay missionary Paul Rusch in 1934 with three collegiate teams: Rikkyo, Meiji and Waseda. In 1937, an allstar game involving teams representing eastern and western Japan attracted over 25,000 spectators. Recently, the Rice Bowl has drawn crowds of over 60,000.

An NFL exhibition games took place in Tokyo in 1976 called the "Mainichi Star Bowl". The American Bowl was held in Japan thirteen times between 1990 and 2005.

=== Europe ===
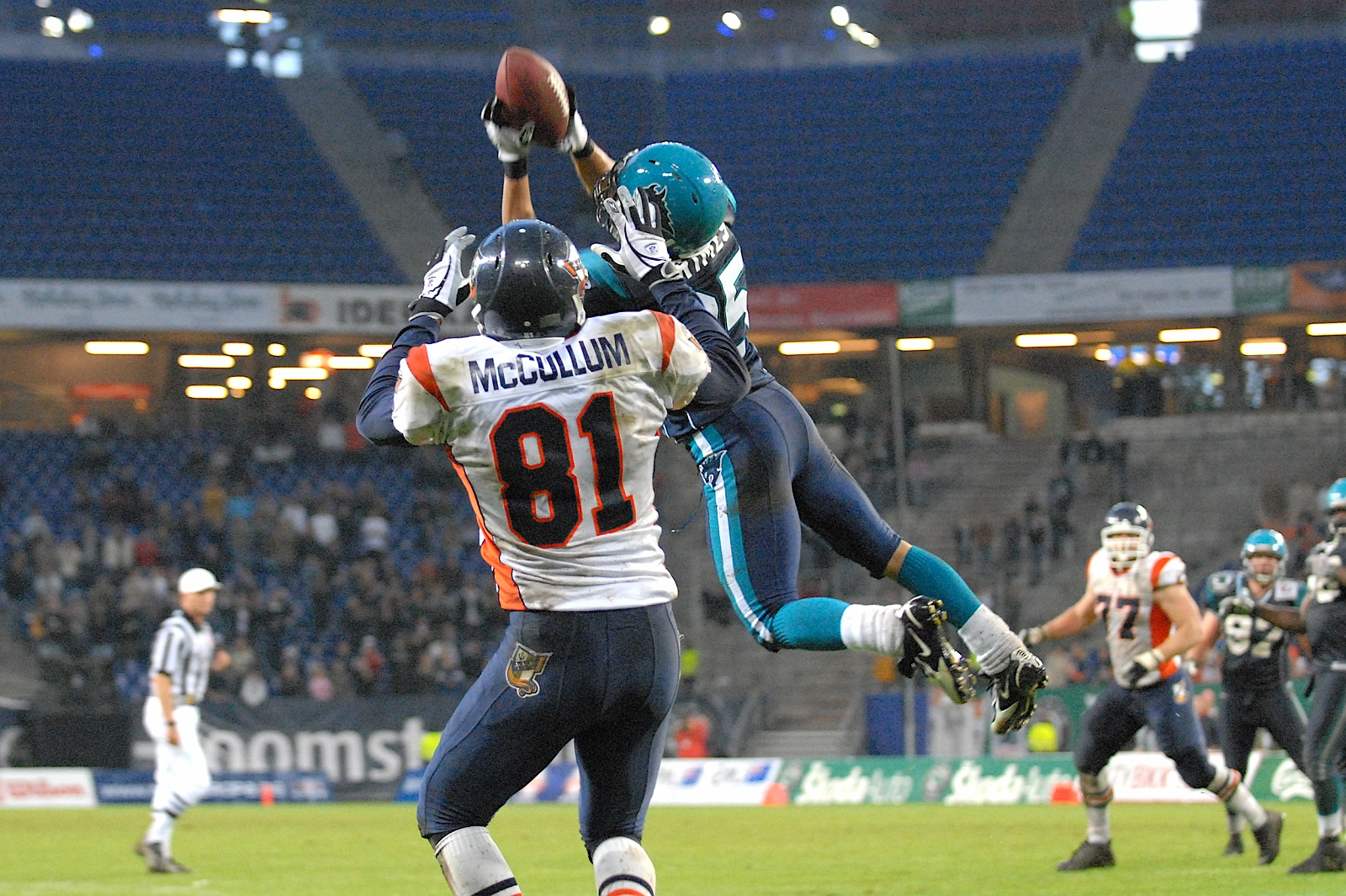
Brent Grimes of NFL Europe's Hamburg Sea Devils intercepts a pass

The game began to take hold in Italy after World War II, with the first game between two European teams occurring between teams from Piacenza and Legnano. A bowl game called the Spaghetti Bowl was played between Fifth Army and Twelfth Air Force in Florence, Italy, on January 1, 1945. The German Football League was formed in 1979. By 1981, the first international games between European nations occurred, as a two-game series between German and Italian teams.

The first European governing body, the American European Football Federation (AEFF) was formed in 1982 by representatives from Finland, Italy, Germany, Austria, and France. The league expanded in 1985 to include Switzerland, the Netherlands, and Great Britain and changed its name to the European Football League. Now known as the European Federation of American Football, it now is made up of 14 member nations. Today, there are approximately 800 American football clubs throughout Europe, with the American football Association of Germany (AFVD) overseeing more than 230 clubs.

The NFL International Series was inaugurated in 2007 to host NFL regular season games outside the United States. Played at the new Wembley Stadium in London (rebuilt and reopened in 2007), the series increased from one to two games for the 2013 season, and then to three games from the 2014 season, then four games in 2017. Beginning in 2018, the series will move to the Northumberland Development Project, although games may still be played at Wembley Stadium. The success of the International Series has led to speculation that London will be chosen as home of an NFL franchise in the future.

=== Brazil ===
American football has been played in Brazil since the 1990s. The official organization governing American football in Brazil is the American Football Association of Brazil, in Portuguese Associação de Futebol Americano de Brasil (AFAB).

== Similar codes of football ==
A modern sport that derives from American football is Arena football, designed to be played indoors inside of hockey or basketball arenas. The game was invented in 1981 by Jim Foster and the Arena Football League was founded in 1987 as the first major professional league to play the sport. Several other indoor football leagues have since been founded and continue to play today.

== See also ==
- Early history of American football
- American football rules
- Comparison of American football and rugby league
- Comparison of American football and rugby union
- Comparison of Canadian and American football
- Gridiron football
- Homosexuality in American football
- Black players in American professional football
- History of the football helmet
- List of historically significant college football games
- Timeline of college football in Kansas
