= Durval Queiroz Neto =

Brazilian-American football player (born 1992)

Profile
- Position: Defensive tackle

Personal information
- Born: 27 August 1992 (age 34); Diamantino, Brazil
- Listed height: 6 ft 4 in (1.93 m)
- Listed weight: 330 lb (150 kg)

Career information
- NFL draft: 2019: undrafted

Career history
- Miami Dolphins (2019)*
- * Offseason or practice squad member only
- Stats at Pro Football Reference

Durval Queiroz Neto (born August 27, 1992) (Durr-VAHL-KEY-ay-royce-NAY-toh), also known as Duzão, is a Brazilian former American football player who was briefly an offensive guard for the Miami Dolphins of the National Football League (NFL).

He is the first Brazilian athlete to enter the NFL from the Brazilian American Football Championship, all Brazilians who came before him had training in the NCAA.

His first club in American football was Tangará Taurus-MT. But his career took off quickly. After two years, he was at Cuiabá Arsenal and in another year he went to Galo FA, reached the Brazil national American football team with shirt number 99 and then went to the NFL.

== Career ==
=== Start ===
He started playing the sport with Tangará Taurus, in Tangará da Serra, in 2011, still without equipment or instructions. A person saw him on the street and said that the city had an American football team and that they needed someone his size. He arrived for his first training session wearing flip-flops.

They instructed him to "stop the player with the ball in his hands." Then, he took down his opponent and fell in love with the sport. Two years later, in 2015, Cuiabá Arsenal, one of the best-known American football teams in Brazil, invited Duzão and his brother, Eugênio Carlos Queiroz Júnior, to train with them.

Durval and Juninho went from Tangará to Cuiabá every weekend, around 500 km away, until their parents forced them to transfer college to Cuiabá and move to the capital. In 2016, he was champion of Mato Grosso with Cuiabá Arsenal. In 2017, he received his first call-up to the Brazilian American Football Team, also known as Brasil Onças. At the end of the year, he was awarded the best defensive tackle in Brazil.

In August 2018, he signed with Galo FA and was Brazilian champion in 2018. At the end of the year, it was announced that he would represent Brazil in NFL Undiscovered 2019.

=== NFL ===
He entered the NFL through the International Player Pathway Program, which gives 7 foreign players the opportunity to compete for 4 places in the league. He starred in the TV show NFL Undiscovered, broadcast on the official NFL Network channel.

He exchanged his career on the family farms for the dream of playing in the NFL with the help of his agent, American Kenneth "KJ" Joshen Jr. He moved to the United States and took courses dedicated to American football.

He impressed the league scouts with his performance in drills, specific exercises, with numbers on par with the highest rated athletes coming out of universities for the draft. In 2019, he signed, for 3 years with the Miami Dolphins.

On July 30, 2019, during training camp, following the advice of the Dolphins coaching staff, Duzão switched his position from DT on the defensive line to G (guard) on the Offensive Line.

=== Leaving the NFL and returning to Brazil ===
Neto was released from the Dolphins in September 2020 and his return to Galo FA (Atlético-MG de Futebol Americano) was soon confirmed. He stayed at the Minas Gerais club for a short time, as the idea was more to gain experience than to play. He has been retired since December 2022.

== Personal life ==
Duzão was born in Cuiabá, in the state of Mato Grosso, but was raised in Diamantino. He practiced judo from the age of 4 to 19 and even won 10 Brazilian and South American champion medals. The former player still practices the sport today and is a black belt.

At the beginning of his adulthood, he went to Tangará da Serra to study agronomy, but he included American football almost informally, playing on weekends, without equipment and with little knowledge of the rules. He started playing for Tangará Taurus.

He took an agricultural technician course and then graduated in Agricultural Engineering. He had the opportunity to finish high school in the United States.

A fervent Catholic and raised on a farm, Durval Queiroz has ridden horses and taken care of cattle since he was a child. In the 2018 elections, he got into controversy with some fans for declaring support for then-president Jair Bolsonaro for re-election.

In an interview in 2023, he declared that he dreams of forming a family - getting married and having children - and buying a small plane, as it was his childhood dream to know how to fly.
