= American football at the Summer Olympics =

- IOC Code: AFB
- Governing body: IFAF
- Events: 1 (men)

Summer Olympics
- 1896; 1900; 1904; 1908; 1912; 1920; 1924; 1928; 1932; 1936; 1948; 1952; 1956; 1960; 1964; 1968; 1972; 1976; 1980; 1984; 1988; 1992; 1996; 2000; 2004; 2008; 2012; 2016; 2020; 2024; 2028; 2032; Note: demonstration or exhibition sport years indicated in italics
- Medalists

American football was featured in the Summer Olympic Games demonstration programme in 1904 and 1932. College football was played at the 1904 Olympics, which was played at Francis Field, but was, in reality, college teams playing each other as part of their regular seasons. The sport was eventually played officially as a demonstration sport only once, in 1932. Though American football has not been played in the Olympics since then, various American football players have participated in the Olympics. The International Federation of American Football (IFAF) oversees the IFAF World Championship, which is an international tournament, which itself is held every four years.

In 2013, the International Olympic Committee (IOC) gave provisional recognition to the IFAF, setting up a possible vote on its future participation in the Olympics, but in 2015, the IOC rejected the IFAF's application to include American football at the 2020 Summer Olympics. The IFAF subsequently launched efforts to instead include flag football at the Summer Olympics, the non-contact variant of American football where players pull off flags from the ball carrier instead of tackling them, which the IOC eventually approved in 2023 to include at the 2028 Summer Games.

== 1904 Summer Games ==
Saint Louis University and Washington University in St. Louis initially sought to contest an Olympic football championship, but were unable to host it officially. Both teams ended up simply playing their regular seasons from teams around the country, making their status as an official demonstration sport dubious. St. Louis was declared the champion "by default". As Francis Field was the main stadium for the 1904 Summer Olympics, only those games would have been considered a demonstration for Olympic crowds. Only two games at Francis Field were played that did not involve Washington University: a match between Purdue and Missouri, and the first match between two Indian school teams (Haskell and Carlisle) who were considered powerhouses in college football at the time.

- Note: All games below were played at Francis Olympic Field

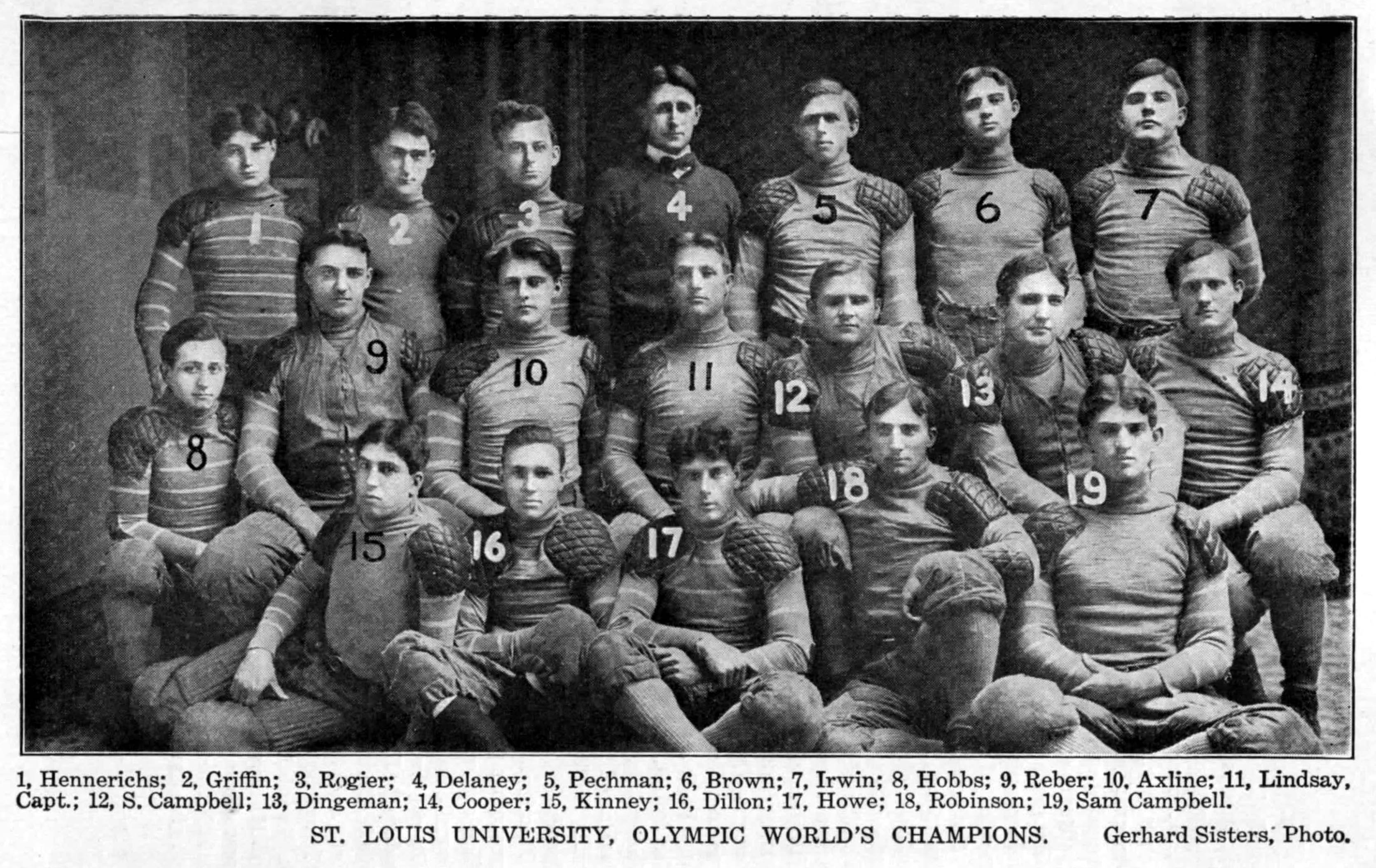
Saint Louis University's 1904 "Olympic World's Champions"

Date	Winning team	Losing team	Score
September 28, 1904	WashU	Shurtleff	10–0
October 5, 1904	WashU	Rose	16–5
October 8, 1904	Illinois	WashU	31–0
October 15, 1904	Sewanee	WashU	17–0
October 19, 1904	WashU	Drury	36–0
October 22, 1904	Indiana	WashU	21–6
October 28, 1904	Purdue	Missouri	11–0
October 29, 1904	Texas	WashU	23–0
November 5, 1904	WashU	Missouri	11–0
November 12, 1904	Kansas	WashU	12–0
November 19, 1904	West Virginia	WashU	6–5
November 24, 1904	Haskell	WashU	47–0
November 26, 1904	Carlisle	Haskell	38–4

== 1932 Summer Games ==
American football was a demonstration sport at the 1932 Summer Olympics in Los Angeles, with a single exhibition game held at Los Angeles Memorial Coliseum on August 8. Seniors from three Western universities (Cal, Stanford, and USC) were matched against those from the East Coast's "Big Three" (Harvard, Yale, and Princeton). The West team won by a score of 7–6.

== IOC rejection and the future ==
Though American football has not been played in the Olympics since then, various American football players have participated in the Olympics. The sport has been considered by some as incompatible with the Olympics for several reasons, among them the high-risk of injury, inconvenience in the time period the games are held, and its lack of global popularity. In 2013, the International Olympic Committee gave provisional recognition to the International Federation of American Football (IFAF), setting up a possible vote on its future participation in the Olympics. In 2015, American Football wasn't included in the 2020 additions with critics voicing the IFAF's lack of effort and surrounding drama around the 2015 IFAF World Championship.

Following the IOC's decline of the IFAF's application, the IFAF resubmitted its application, re-earning the provisional recognition for the possible addition in the 2024 Summer Olympics, with the earliest vote being as possible as 2017. It had also been argued that due to roster restrictions, seven-on-seven was the most likely style of play to make it as a medal event in the same vein as rugby sevens, which debuted at the 2016 Summer Olympics. Eventually, American football was not included in the 2024 Olympics.

The IFAF and the National Football League later backed a proposal to include flag football, a non-contact variation of the game, as a one-off event at the 2028 Summer Olympics in Los Angeles. Flag football became a viable alternative for its limited contact, low costs, and accessibility to both men and women. The bid was successful and flag football was officially announced as a sport exclusively for the 2028 games in October 2023. In May 2025, NFL owners unanimously approved the participation of players at the 2028 Summer Olympics, pending negotiations.

== See also ==
- American football at the World Games
  - American football at the 2005 World Games
  - American football at the 2017 World Games
- IFAF World Championship
- IFAF Women's World Championship
