= American football at the World Games =

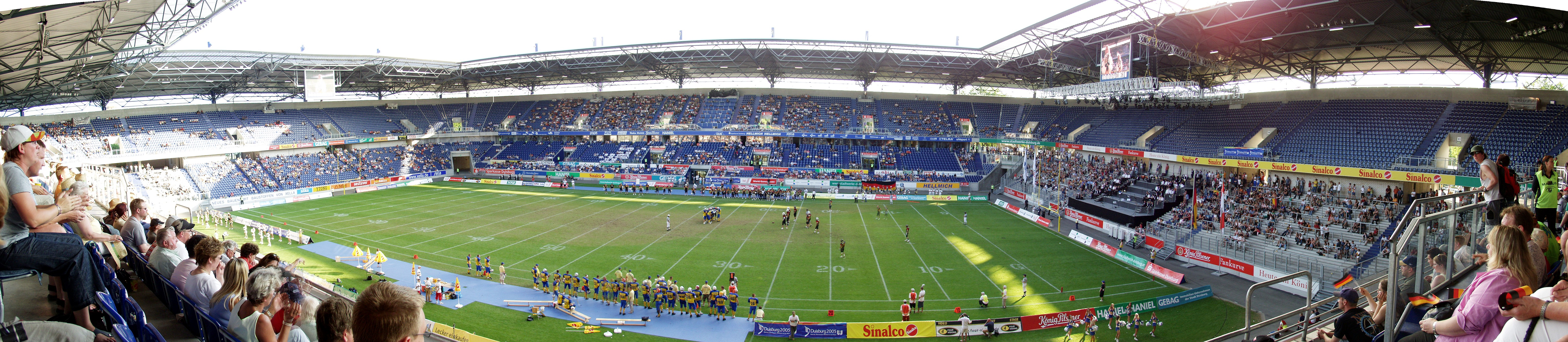
American football final at the 2005 World Games

American football was introduced as a World Games invitational sport at the 2005 World Games in Duisburg. There was also an American Football tournament at the 2017 World Games in Wrocław. Both times only a competition for the male sides was held with four national teams participating. In 2005 the participating countries were Germany, Australia, Sweden and France while in 2017 the United States, Germany, France and Poland participated. The United States was represented by college players.

== Men's ==
Games	Gold	Silver	Bronze
2005 Duisburg	Germany	Sweden	France
2017 Wrocław	France	Germany	United States
2029 Karlsruhe			

== Men's flag football ==
Games	Gold	Silver	Bronze
2022 Birmingham	United States	Italy	Mexico

== Women's flag football ==
Games	Gold	Silver	Bronze
2022 Birmingham	Mexico	United States	Panama
2025 Chengdu	Mexico	United States	Canada

== See also ==
- American football at the Summer Olympics
- American football at the 1932 Summer Olympics
- Flag football at the Summer Olympics
- IFAF World Championship
