= Flag football at the Summer Olympics =

- IOC Code: FFB
- Governing body: IFAF
- Events: 2 (men: 1; women: 1)

Summer Olympics
- 1896; 1900; 1904; 1908; 1912; 1920; 1924; 1928; 1932; 1936; 1948; 1952; 1956; 1960; 1964; 1968; 1972; 1976; 1980; 1984; 1988; 1992; 1996; 2000; 2004; 2008; 2012; 2016; 2020; 2024; 2028; 2032
- Medalists

The 2028 Summer Olympics will introduce the sport of flag football for the first time. Two events, one for men and one for women, will be held. Flag football, a non-contact variant of American football in which players remove flags attached to the ball carrier instead of tackling them, was previously contested at the 2022 World Games and was featured at the 2025 World Games.

== Background ==
=== American football ===
Out of the major professional sports in the United States, only American football has never been an official sport at the Olympic Games. It has been a demonstration sport at the Summer Olympic Games twice: at the 1904 Summer Olympics, several games were played at Francis Olympic Field between college football teams, and the status of these matches as Olympic is dubious; and at the 1932 Summer Olympics, one game was played between East and West All-Stars. Although several American football players have been Olympians, American football itself has never been an official Olympic sport. The sport is widely considered as incompatible with the Olympics for several reasons, among them the high risk of injury, inconvenience in the time period the games are held and its lack of global popularity. American football was also an invitational/demonstration men's sport at the 2005 World Games and 2017 World Games, and will return to the 2029 World Games.

In 2013, the International Olympic Committee (IOC) gave provisional recognition to the International Federation of American Football (IFAF), setting up a possible future vote for the sport to be at the games. The IFAF applied to the Olympics for 2020, but was denied, with controversy in the 2015 IFAF World Championship contributing to the decision.

=== Flag football ===
After American football was declined as an Olympic sport, the IFAF launched efforts to introduce flag football, a non-contact variant of the sport where players pull off flags from the ball carrier instead of tackling them. The National Football League (NFL) began to push for the sport to be held at the 2028 Summer Olympics in Los Angeles as a way to showcase the sport and boost its global popularity. In 2022, they jointly launched the group "Vision28" to lobby for flag football to be added to the program. The NFL and IFAF considered flag football a viable alternative to American football for its limited contact, low costs, and due to it being playable by both men and women.

At Super Bowl LVII, the NFL held a five-on-five flag football event between players from the Mexican and American national teams in front of Olympic officials, and the sport was featured at the 2022 and 2025 World Games. It moved closer to being at the Olympics when the IOC Executive Board gave the IFAF approval to be considered as an optional sport at the IOC Session in March 2023. By that August, flag football was one of nine sports in consideration for the 2028 games, along with cricket, motorsport, baseball/softball, karate, breakdancing, kickboxing, lacrosse and squash. In early September, the list of sports was finalized by the IOC and in mid-October, flag football was approved by the IOC at their meeting in Mumbai, India, as one of five additions to the 2028 program, along with cricket, squash, baseball / softball and lacrosse, with only two out of 90 members voting "no". The approved version will feature two events, one for men and one for women, with the games being played five-on-five on a 50-yard field with no linemen.

Philadelphia Eagles quarterback Jalen Hurts was named the sport's ambassador for the 2028 Summer Olympics, and featured in an NFL teaser where he lit the torch at the Los Angeles Memorial Coliseum by throwing a flaming football. Commissioner Roger Goodell stated that there had been interest from NFL players in participating in the tournament, and that he would be working with the National Football League Players Association (NFLPA) to secure an agreement. In May 2025, the Canadian Football League (CFL) and the Canadian Football League Players Association (CFLPA) allowed their players to participate in the Olympics. Also that month, the NFL officially allowed their players to play in the Olympics, with the league hoping to showcase its sport on the global stage.
