= Porto Alegre Pumpkins =

American football team in Brazil

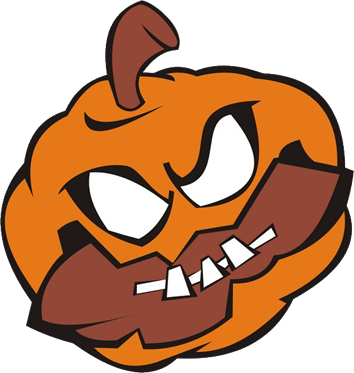
- Full name: Porto Alegre Pumpkins
- Nicknames: Pumpkins
- Founded: October 31, 2005
- Based in: Porto Alegre, Brazil
- Colors: Orange, Black, White
- President: Vinícius Bergmann

Uniforms
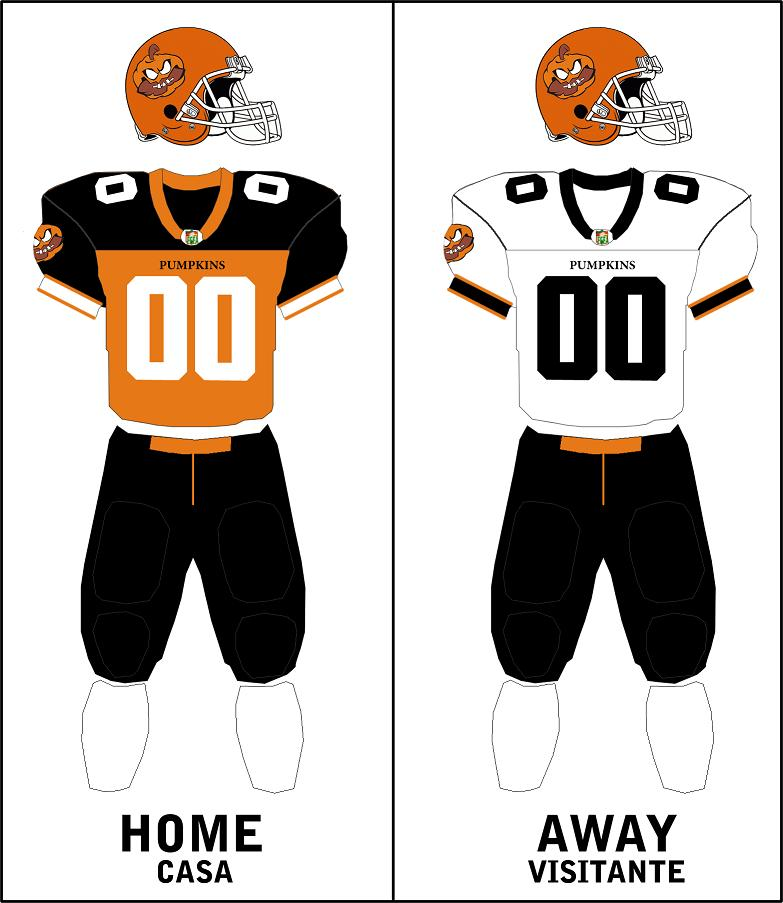

The Porto Alegre Pumpkins are an American football team based in Porto Alegre, Rio Grande do Sul, Brazil. The team competes in the Superliga Nacional de Futebol Americano. The Pumpkins were founded in 2005. They were the first team founded in Rio Grande do Sul.

They were the winners of the state championship in 2008, 2010, 2012 and 2014.

== History ==
=== No pads ===
- Campeonato Gaúcho 2008
- Campeonato Gaúcho 2010

The second edition of the state championship began with a convincing victory against the team of Esteio Buriers on 14 March, followed by a 26–20 win against the other team from Porto Alegre, ensuring the title of "Capital Division" the championship, still counting with a thrilling victory against the Santa Maria Soldiers with the winning touchdown being converted by Vinicius Bergmann with 2 seconds to the end of the match, which ended at 19–16.

In the next stage, the semifinals, the opponent would again Esteio Buriers, which included strengthening Keke Gant, athlete of the American NCAA. A close match was won 20–19, which guaranteed them a trip to the final, which would be played at the home team's best campaign, Santa Cruz do Sul Chacais, reissuing the 2008 final.

On 19 September, the Estádio dos Plátanos, the day after the match against Timbo Rhinos by LBFA, the Pumpkins defended against their greatest rivals, with a touchdown and Vinicius Bergmann, and the 2nd quarter secured the state championship.

=== "Full Pads" ===
As part of the project team and the growth of the sport in the state of Rio Grande do Sul, in 2010 the team made the effort to buy his first equipment, aiming at the participation of LBFA 2010, the first edition of the National Football League.

Despite the difficulties and lack of support, the athletes of the team were able to purchase enough helmets and shoulder pads so they could on August 28 debut not only in the league but also host the first match of the Sport as it should be practiced. The adversary was at the time Barigüi Crocodiles, which would be in December, champion of "Southern Conference" of LBFA and vice Brazilian champion. Despite the 26–07 defeat by the team made history when, in the 2nd quarter of the starting Running Back Jamal, shirt 23, breached the lines of defense of Paraná team and scored the first touchdown in the history of American Football gaucho. Although the team's participation in the tournament has not done justice to the story of successes and victories of Pumpkins, this paved way for the growth of the sport, prompting other teams to equip.

In 2011, the most classic of sports in the Rio Grande was repeated for the first time by a national competition and equipped as the Santa Cruz do Sul Chacais also joined LBFA for the season, the Pumpkins contest for second time .

== Competições ==
Until the 2010 season, the team played in the Campeonato Gaúcho de Futebol Americano, in the form "nopads", however, with the migration to the modality that uses the equipment, the Pumpkins left the competition that followed the old way.

In the same year the team joined the Brazilian Football League, tournament remains the main competition of the season team.

=== Titles ===
- Campeonato Gaúcho: 2008, 2010, 2012, 2014
- Divisão Capital: 2010
- Portobowl: 2009
- CSFA - Leste: Vice Campeão 2012
