= Rudy Rintala =

American athlete (1909–1999)

- Rintala's four-letter status gained national attention in 1931.

Personal information
- Born: Rudolph Alexander Rintala; February 6, 1909 Brooklyn, New York, U.S.
- Died: December 11, 1999 (aged 90) Atherton, California, U.S.
- Spouse: Mary Thayer (1933–1999, his death)

Sport
- Sport: Football, baseball, basketball, track and field
- Position: Halfback (football), center fielder (baseball), guard (basketball)
- Event: Javelin
- College team: Stanford

Rudolph Alexander Rintala (February 6, 1909 – December 11, 1999) was an American collegiate athlete from 1928 to 1932 who starred in football, baseball, basketball, and track and field at Stanford University. Regarded as an all-time great of the school's athletic program, Rintala was a participant in the demonstration game of football at the 1932 Summer Olympics, held in Los Angeles, California. Rintala is a member of the Stanford University athletic hall of fame.

== Biography ==
=== Early years ===
Rintala was born on February 6, 1909, in Brooklyn, New York City. He grew up in San Francisco, California, where he graduated from San Francisco Polytechnic High School. He was of Finnish descent.

=== Sports career ===
Rintala gained a reputation as an outstanding high school football player in the fall of 1927, playing halfback on offense and showing skill as a tackler on the defensive side of the ball.

Rintala attended Stanford University, where he first played for the school's Freshman team in the fall of 1928. The next year he moved to the varsity team, playing left halfback for legendary coach Pop Warner. Rintala was small and agile, standing 5'9" tall and weighing 170 pounds in 1929, his Sophomore year.

Rintala also starred as a center fielder for the Stanford baseball team, batting cleanup and serving as team captain in 1932. He also was a starting guard for the Stanford basketball team, and threw javelin for the school's varsity track and field squad.

Rintala was the 1932 recipient of the Jake Gimbel Award, an annual prize presented to an outstanding senior athlete "whose attitude toward things athletic is outstanding."

Rintala graduated from Stanford in 1932 with a degree in accounting. Following graduation, he continued to play football for a time for the San Francisco Olympic Club, competing alongside other former collegiate stars against other amateur clubs and college teams.

In the middle of July 1932, Rintala reported for his first practice with one of two all-star squads selected to play a demonstration game of football at the 1932 Summer Olympics in Los Angeles. This game, which pitted recently graduated students from three East Coast football powers (Harvard, Yale, and Princeton) against those from three top West Coast schools — the University of Southern California, Stanford, and the University of California, Berkeley. On the night of August 8, 1932, some 60,000 fans attended the contest at the Los Angeles Coliseum, seeing a hard-fought battle which was won late in the game by the West, 7-6.

=== Life after athletics ===
In 1933, Rintala married the former Mary Thayer. The couple raised two children, a son and a daughter.

Rintala worked as an accountant for many years in the steel industry before going into private practice as a certified public accountant in 1956. He retired from the profession in 1974.

=== Death and legacy ===
Rintala died December 11, 1999, at his home in Atherton, California.

Rintala was elected to the Stanford Sports Hall of Fame in September 1964 for his baseball career. As a four-sport collegiate star, he is regarded as an icon of athletic prowess by in the lore of Stanford athletics, with a name mentioned alongside the school's other All-American four-sport legend, Ernie Nevers.
