= Matt Rahn =

American football player and coach (born 1982)

Matthew Rahn
- Rahn in 2026

DuPage Chaparrals
- Position: Head coach
- Roster status: Active

Personal information
- Born: January 14, 1982 (age 44); Wheaton, Illinois, U.S.
- Listed height: 6 ft 4 in (1.93 m)
- Listed weight: 310 lb (141 kg)

Career information
- High school: Wheaton North (IL)
- College: DuPage (2000–2001); Hastings (2002–2004)
- NFL draft: 2005: undrafted

Career history

Playing
- Chicago Slaughter (2007); Milwaukee Bonecrushers (2008); Rock River Raptors (2009); Chicago Cardinals (2010); Wisconsin Wolfpack (2010); Cuiabá Arsenal (2010); Northern Kentucky River Monsters (2011); Cleveland Gladiators (2012); Chicago Blitz (2014); Omaha Beef (2012-2014); Chicago Blitz (2016)*; Sioux City Bandits (2015)
- * Offseason or practice squad member only

Coaching
- Harper (2010) Offensive line coach; DuPage (2014–2019) Co-defensive coordinator & defensive line coach; DuPage (2020) Acting head coach; DuPage (2021–present) Head coach

Operations
- Cuiabá Arsenal (2010–2012) Football ambassador

Awards and highlights
- 1st Team All-CIFL (2010); Brazilian National Champion; 1st Team All-UIFL; CIF champion (2015); First Team CIF Northern Conference (2017); All-CIF Team (2017); First Team CIF Northern Conference (2018)
- Stats at ArenaFan.com

Matthew Rahn (born January 14, 1982) is an American football coach and former player. He is the head football coach at the College of DuPage in Glen Ellyn, Illinois, a position he had held since 2020. Rahn has led the DuPage Chaparrals to five consecutive NJCAA Division III National Football Championships, from 2021 to 2025.

== College career ==
Rahn attended the College of DuPage, where he was a member of the football team. His play earned him a scholarship to Hastings College in Nebraska.

== Professional career ==
=== Chicago Slaughter ===
In 2007, Rahn began playing professionally for the Chicago Slaughter of the Continental Indoor Football League. The Slaughter was in its inaugural season led by ex-Chicago Bears player, Steve McMichael. Rahn played nose tackle.

=== Milwaukee Bonecrushers ===
In 2008, Rahn played for the Milwaukee Bonecrushers of the CIFL, where he was moved to primarily Guard and Tight end, as well as reserve defensive lineman.

=== Rock River Raptors ===
In 2009, Rahn played for the Rock River Raptors of the Continental Indoor Football League.

=== Chicago Cardinals ===
In 2010, Rahn played for the Chicago Cardinals also of the CIFL.

=== Wisconsin Wolfpack ===
Because of financial reasons, Rahn opted out of his contract with the Cardinals to find a better opportunity. He signed with the Wisconsin Wolfpack, who would eventually play in the 2010 CIFL Championship Game, where they lost to the Cincinnati Commandos 54–40. He was named a 1st Team All-CIFL lineman at the end of the season.

=== Cuiabá Arsenal ===
In 2010, Rahn signed with the Cuiabá Arsenal in Brazil. They won the 2010 national championship, and finished second in 2011.

=== Northern Kentucky River Monsters ===
In 2011, Rahn signed with the Northern Kentucky River Monsters of the Ultimate Indoor Football League. He was named 1st Team All-UIFL Offensive Lineman, while helping his team to an 11–3 regular season record.

=== Cleveland Gladiators ===
Rahn signed with the Cleveland Gladiators of the Arena Football League for the 2012 season.

=== Omaha Beef ===
Rahn signed with the Omaha Beef in the middle of the 2012 season. He then played the 2013 and 2014 seasons with them also.

=== Sioux City Bandits ===
Rahn played the 2015 and 2016 season with the Sioux City Bandits of Champions Indoor Football. On February 22, 2017, in late February Rahn was talked out of retirement and re-signed for the 2017 season. Rahn signed back with the Sioux City Bandits for the 2018 season, as the oldest player in the league helped his team to the Championship game while earning First Team CIF North honors.

== Coaching career ==
Since 2020, Rahn has been the head football coach at his alma mater, the College of DuPage. He has led the DuPage Chaparrals to five consecutive NJCAA Division III National Football Championships, from 2021 to 2025.

== Head coaching record ==
Year	Team	Overall	Conference	Standing	Bowl/playoffs	D3^{#}
DuPage Chaparrals (NJCAA independent) (2020)
2020–21	No team—COVID-19					
DuPage Chaparrals (NJCAA Division III independent) (2021–present)
2021	DuPage	9–2			W Red Grange Bowl	1
2022	DuPage	9–2			W Red Grange Bowl	1
2023	DuPage	11–1			W Red Grange Bowl	1
2024	DuPage	11–1			W Red Grange Bowl	1
2025	DuPage	8–2			W Red Grange Bowl	1
DuPage:		48–8				
Total:		48–8				
National championship Conference title Conference division title or championship game berth
