= Brazilian Confederation of American Football =

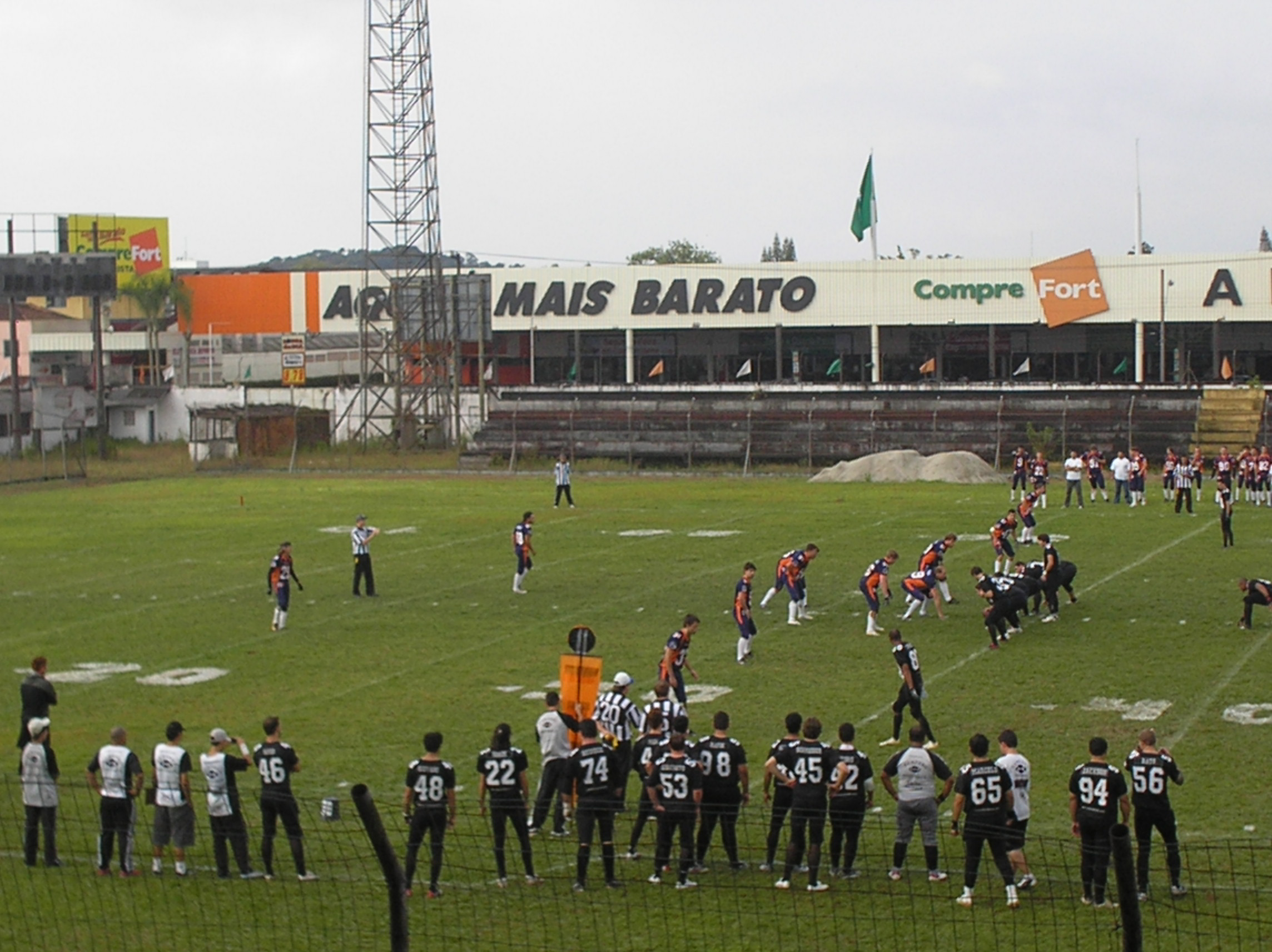
Santa Catarina state championship game in 2008.

The Confederação Brasileira de Futebol Americano (CBFA) (translation: Brazilian Confederation of American Football), is the highest authority for American football in Brazil. The organization is responsible for organizing, regulating, and promoting the development of American football in Brazil. In addition to traditional American football, it is responsible for flag football and manages the Brazilian national teams.

The confederation is recognized by the International Federation of American Football (IFAF).

== History ==
The Confederation was formally established on March 9, 2013. It replaced the Brazilian American Football Association (AFAB), which was founded in 2000.

In 2012 they organized the National American Football League. In 2016, its championship and the Touchdown Tournament (another national championship) were combined into a single championship. That year consisted of 30 teams from 16 States plus the Federal District that were divided into four conferences. There were ongoing changes until in 2022 there was another split between the CBFA and the BFA league resulting in two separate national championships.

In the context of flag football, the first international game was the women's team at the 2012 IFAF Flag Football World Championships. They have continued to play the World Championships as well as in the World Games. While there were initially only women's flag football teams, the men's teams have quickly grown. In 2023 there were more than 60 active men's teams. The men's teams have also competed in both World Championships and World Games.

Domestically the flag football championship has been held since 2013. The Brazilian Flag Football Cup is played in a regional format with champions for each part of Brazil granting a place in the Super Final.

== Presidents ==
Number	Name	Years
1	Flávio Cardia	2013 – 2014
2	Gustavo Sousa	2015 – 2017
3	Rogério Pimentel Silva	2017 – 2019
4	Ítalo Mingoni	2019 – 2020
5	Marcelli Bassani	2020 – 2021
6	Cristiane Kajiwara	2021 – present

== See also ==
- Brazil national American football team
