= Brazil national team =

Brazil national team may refer to:

- Brazil national American football team
- Brazil national baseball team
- Brazil men's national basketball team
- Brazil women's national basketball team
- Brazil national football team
- Brazil women's national football team
- Brazil men's national handball team
- Brazil women's national handball team
- Brazil national rugby union team
- Brazil women's national rugby union team
- Brazil men's national volleyball team
- Brazil women's national volleyball team
