= Torneio Touchdown =

American football league

- Current season, competition or edition: 2014 Torneio Touchdown
- Founded: 2008
- No. of teams: 20
- Country: Brazil
- Most recent champion: Vasco da Gama Patriotas (1st title) (2014)
- Most titles: Corinthians Steamrollers (2 titles)

Touchdown Tournament was an American football league composed of teams from different Brazilian states. The league format was developed by the leaders Flavio "Skin" Cardia of the Fluminense Imperadores, and Mario Lewandowski of the São Paulo Storm, who chaired the Steering Committee of the League. The project was presented to the public during the Tournament Selections AFAB in April 2009, by signing a statement of commitment by the representatives of the 10 teams involved. Eight of the 10 teams declared themselves able to participate in the Touchdown Tournament in 2009.

In 2010, most teams who competed in the league left in 2009, after the end of the season, to create the Liga Brasileira de Futebol Americano (LBFA) due to differences with the commissioner Andrew Joseph Adler, who held the right to use the Torneio Touchdown name.

However, in 2013, some teams returned to Torneio Touchdown, raising the number of participating teams to 20, the highest since the creation of the league.

== Teams ==
=== Current teams (2013) ===
Team	City/Area
Conference Walter Camp
Vasco da Gama Patriotas	Rio de Janeiro, Rio de Janeiro
Minas Locomotiva	Belo Horizonte, Minas Gerais
Tubarões do Cerrado	Brasília, Distrito Federal
Brasília V8	Brasília, Distrito Federal
Salvador All Saints	Salvador, Bahia
Conference George Halas
Flamengo FA	Rio de Janeiro, Rio de Janeiro
Corinthians Steamrollers	São Paulo, São Paulo
Botafogo Challengers	Ribeirão Preto, São Paulo
Campo Grande Gravediggers	Campo Grande, Mato Grosso do Sul
Uberlândia Lobos	Uberlândia, Minas Gerais
Conference Bill Walsh
Jaraguá Breakers	Jaraguá do Sul, Santa Catarina
Timbó Rex	Timbó, Santa Catarina
Lusa Lions	São Paulo, São Paulo
Juventude Gladiators	Caxias do Sul, Rio Grande do Sul
Porto Alegre Bulls	Porto Alegre, Rio Grande do Sul
Conference Vince Lombardi
Vila Velha Tritões	Vila Velha, Espírito Santo
Vitória Antares	Vitória, Espírito Santo
Botafogo F.A.	Rio de Janeiro, Rio de Janeiro
Santos Tsunami	Santos, São Paulo
Ipatinga Tigres	Ipatinga, Minas Gerais

=== Former teams ===
- Barigüi Crocodiles (2009)
- Cuiabá Arsenal (2009)
- Curitiba Brown Spiders (2009)
- Joinville Gladiators (2009)
- Rio de Janeiro Imperadores (2009)
- Sorocaba Vipers (2009)
- São José Istepôs (2010)
- São Paulo Spartans (2010)
- Ribeirao Preto Challengers (2011-2013)

== See also ==
- AFAB
- Brazil national American football team
