= Corinthians Steamrollers =

American football team in São Paulo, Brazil

Logo

General information
- Founded: 2004; 22 years ago
- Stadium: Parque São Jorge
- Headquartered: São Paulo, Brazil
- Colors: Black and White

Personnel
- Head coach: Fabio Marin Jr.
- President: Ricardo Trigo

League / conference affiliations
- Touchdown Tournament

Championships
- League championships: 0; 2011, 2012

Current uniform
Home

Away

The Corinthians Steamrollers are an American football team competing in the South Conference of the Touchdown Tournament. Based in São Paulo, the team was founded in 2004. The Steamrollers are associated with Sport Club Corinthians Paulista. The Steamrollers play their home games at Estádio Parque São Jorge, or Fazendinha, which opened in 1928 and holds 13,969 people.

The Steamrollers have won the Touchdown Tournament twice (2011 and 2012) and have appeared in all but one edition of the tournament. The Steamrollers were undefeated both times during the years in which they have won the Touchdown Tournament In addition to the two national titles, the Steamrollers are four times São Paulo State Champions (2011, 2012, 2013 and 2014) going undefeated in the 2012, 2013 and 2014 titles. One of the Steamrollers largest feat was the Latin American tournament "Torneo Guerreros de los Andes" won in 2014. Between 2011 and 2012 the Steamrollers were in a 39-game winning streak.

Currently, the team has 1,395,000 followers on Facebook, making the team with most followers on Facebook in Brazil and with a number of followers greater than eight NFL franchises.

In March 2017, the team signed a jersey sponsorship with online entertainment brand Bodog.

In July 2019 they lost to Rio Preto Weilers in the finals of SPFL championship

== See also ==
- SC Corinthians Paulista
- SC Corinthians Paulista (women)
- SC Corinthians Paulista (futsal)
- SC Corinthians Paulista (beach soccer)
- SC Corinthians Paulista (basketball)
- SC Corinthians Paulista (Superleague Formula team)
