= Superliga Nacional de Futebol Americano =

American football league in Brazil

- Founded: 2010
- First season: 2010
- Owner: American Football Brazilian Confederation
- No. of teams: 21
- Country: Brazil
- Most recent champion: Recife Mariners (1st title)
- Most titles: Galo Futebol Americano (3 titles)

The Superliga Nacional de Futebol Americano (National American Football League, previously Liga Brasileira de Futebol Americano, Brazilian American Football League) is an American football league in Brazil. It hosts eight teams that played the Torneio Touchdown.

It follows the structure of the NFL Season - with Conferences, Wildcards and a single-game final, called Brasil Bowl. Cuiabá Arsenal was the first champion of Brasil Bowl.

Its most recent winner is Recife Mariners.

== Teams ==
=== 2024 ===
Team	City/Area
North Conference
Manaus	Manaus, Amazonas
Remo Lions	Belém, Pará
Northeast Conference
Caruaru Wolves	Caruaru, Pernambuco
Cavalaria 2 de Julho	Salvador, Bahia
Fortaleza Tritões	Fortaleza, Ceará
João Pessoa Espectros	João Pessoa, Paraíba
Mossoró Petroleiros	Mossoró, Rio Grande do Norte
Recife Mariners	Recife, Pernambuco
Sergipe Redentores	Aracaju, Sergipe
Center-West Conference
Cuiabá Arsenal	Cuiabá, Mato Grosso
Porto Velho Miners	Porto Velho, Rondônia
Rondonópolis Hawks	Rondonópolis, Mato Grosso
Sinop Coyotes	Sinop, Mato Grosso
Southeast Conference
América Locomotiva	Belo Horizonte, Minas Gerais
Galo	Belo Horizonte, Minas Gerais
Tubarões do Cerrado	Brasília, Federal District
Vasco Almirantes	Rio de Janeiro, Rio de Janeiro
South Conference
Itajaí Almirantes	Itajaí, Santa Catarina
Santa Maria Soldiers	Santa Maria, Rio Grande do Sul
São José Istepôs	São José, Santa Catarina
Timbó Rex	Timbó, Santa Catarina

== Champions ==
Liga Brasileira de Futebol Americano

Year	Winner	Runner-Up	3rd place	4th place	Participants
2010	Cuiaba Arsenal	Coritiba Crocodiles	Fluminense Imperadores	Joinville Gladiators	14
2011	Fluminense Imperadores	Coritiba Crocodiles	Cuiaba Arsenal	Joinville Gladiators	12

Campeonato Brasileiro de Futebol Americano

Year	Winner	Runner-Up	3rd place	4th place	Participant
2012	Cuiabá Arsenal	Coritiba Crocodiles	Botafogo Espectros	Fluminense Imperadores	34
2013	Coritiba Crocodiles	João Pessoa Espectros	São Paulo Storm	São José Istepôs	33

Brazil Bowl

Year	Winner	Score	Runner-Up
2014	Coritiba Crocodiles	23-17	João Pessoa Espectros
2015	João Pessoa Espectros	23-22	Coritiba Crocodiles
2016	Timbó Rex	36-24	Flamengo
2017	Sada Cruzeiro Futebol Americano	36-24	João Pessoa Espectros
2018	Galo Futebol Americano (2)	17-13	João Pessoa Espectros
2019	João Pessoa Espectros (2)	45-21	Timbó Rex
2022	Timbó Rex (2)	30–20	Galo Futebol Americano
2023	Galo Futebol Americano (3)	21–14	Itajaí Almirantes
2024	Recife Mariners	22–6	Galo Futebol Americano

== See also ==
- American Football Brazilian Confederation
- Brazil national American football team
- Torneio Touchdown
