= List of National Football League Olympians =

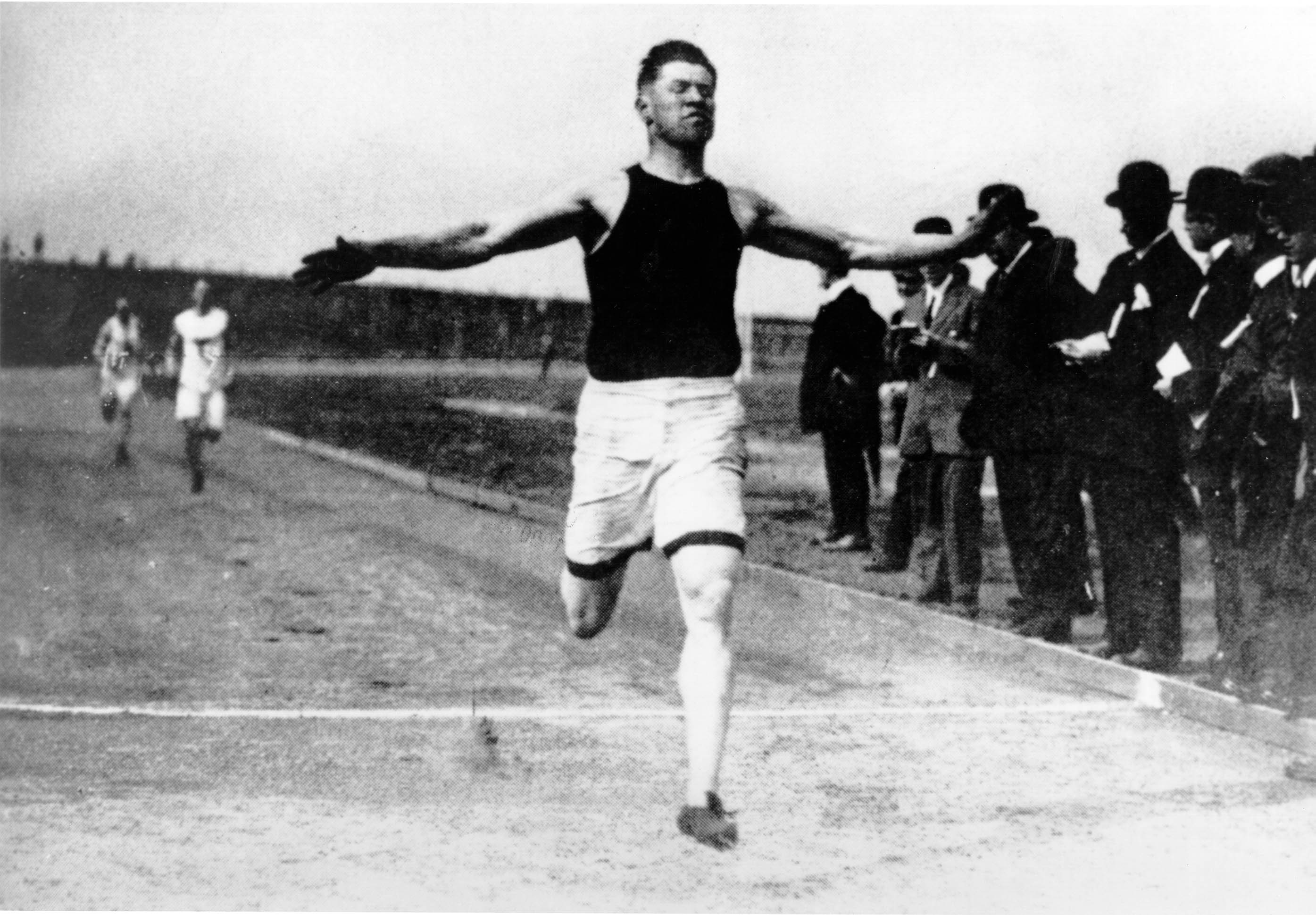
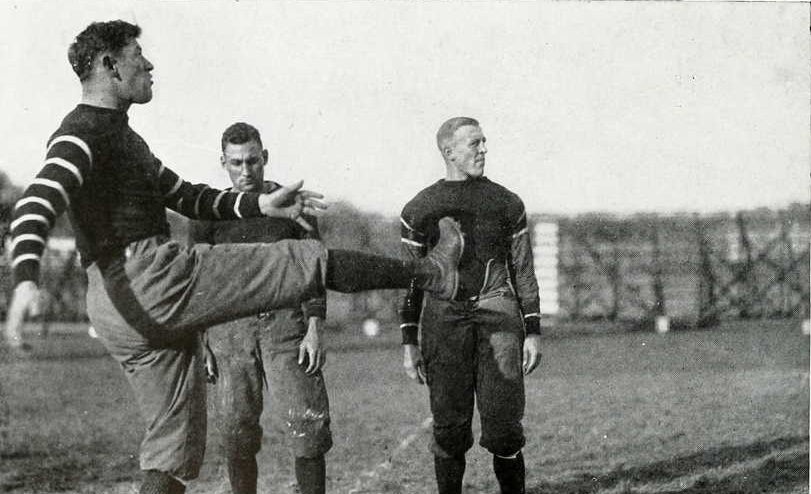
Jim Thorpe participating in the decathlon at the 1912 Summer Olympics (top) and punting (bottom)

The following is a list of National Football League players that have participated in the Olympic Games, with the NFL team for which they played (the team closest to the time of the player's Olympic participation), the sport in which they participated, and their medal count. All represented the United States, except for Colin Ridgway, represented Australia in 1956 and Jahvid Best, represented Saint Lucia in 2016. American football has only been played once in 1932 (though a series demonstration college games were played in 1904).

== Players ==
=== Summer Olympics ===
Player	NFL team	Sport	Olympic year	Gold	Silver	Bronze	Total
Jim Thorpe	Canton Bulldogs	Athletics	1912	2	0	0	2
Ollie Matson	Chicago Cardinals	Athletics	1952	0	1	1	2
Jack Riley	Boston Redskins	Wrestling	1932	0	1	0	1
Bob Hayes	Dallas Cowboys	Athletics	1964	2	0	0	2
Sam Francis	Philadelphia Eagles	Athletics	1936	0	0	0	0
Ron Brown	Los Angeles Rams	Athletics	1984	1	0	0	1
Michael Bates	Seattle Seahawks	Athletics	1992	0	0	1	1
Larry Burton	New Orleans Saints	Athletics	1972	0	0	0	0
Milt Campbell	Cleveland Browns	Athletics	1952/1956	1	1	0	2
Henry Carr	New York Giants	Athletics	1964	2	0	0	2
Michael Carter	San Francisco 49ers	Athletics	1984	0	1	0	1
Glenn Davis	Detroit Lions	Athletics	1956/1960	3	0	0	3
Sam Graddy	Denver Broncos	Athletics	1984	1	1	0	2
Jim Hines	Miami Dolphins	Athletics	1968	2	0	0	2
Lam Jones	New York Jets	Athletics	1976	1	0	0	1
Jess Lewis	Houston Oilers	Wrestling	1968	0	0	0	0
Glenn Morris	Detroit Lions	Athletics	1936	1	0	0	1
Ray Norton	San Francisco 49ers	Athletics	1960	0	0	0	0
James Owens	San Francisco 49ers	Athletics	1976	0	0	0	0
Bob Pickens	Chicago Bears	Wrestling	1964	0	0	0	0
Colin Ridgway	Dallas Cowboys	Athletics	1956	0	0	0	0
Bo Roberson	San Diego Chargers	Athletics	1960	0	1	0	1
Clyde Scott	Philadelphia Eagles	Athletics	1948	0	1	0	1
Tommie Smith	Cincinnati Bengals	Athletics	1968	1	0	0	1
Gerald Tinker	Atlanta Falcons	Athletics	1972	1	0	0	1
T.J. Jackson	Philadelphia Eagles	Athletics	1964	0	0	0	0
James Jett	Los Angeles Raiders	Athletics	1992	1	0	0	1
Jeff Demps	Tampa Bay Buccaneers	Athletics	2012	0	0	0	0
John Spellman	Providence Steam Roller	Wrestling	1924	1	0	0	1
Jim Bausch	Chicago Cardinals	Athletics	1932	1	0	0	1
Gene Vidal	Washington Senators	Athletics	1920/1924	0	0	0	0
Harold Muller	Los Angeles Buccaneers	Athletics	1920	0	1	0	1
Marquise Goodwin	Buffalo Bills	Athletics	2012	0	0	0	0
Nate Ebner	New England Patriots	Rugby sevens	2016	0	0	0	0
Jahvid Best	Detroit Lions	Athletics	2016	0	0	0	0
Randy Dean	New York Giants	Handball	1976	0	0	0	0
Marvin Bracy	Seattle Seahawks	Athletics	2016	0	0	0	0
Devon Allen	Philadelphia Eagles	Athletics	2016/2020	0	0	0	0

=== Winter Olympics ===
Player	NFL team	Sport	Olympic year	Gold	Silver	Bronze	Total
Herschel Walker	Philadelphia Eagles	Bobsledding	1992	0	0	0	0
Johnny Quinn	Green Bay Packers	Bobsledding	2014	0	0	0	0
Jeremy Bloom	Philadelphia Eagles	Freestyle Skiing	2002/2006	0	0	0	0
