= Galo Futebol Americano =

American football team

Logo

General information
- Founded: 2014; 12 years ago
- Headquartered: Belo Horizonte, Brazil
- Website: galofutebolamericano.com.br

Championships
- League championships: 0; 2018, 2019 Campeonato Mineiro

Current uniform
Home

Away

Galo Futebol Americano (Galo FA) is a professional American football team competing in the South Conference of the national league (Superliga Nacional de Futebol Americano), which it won in 2017. Based in Belo Horizonte, Minas Gerais, Brazil the team was founded in 2009. Galo FA is associated with Brazil's football team Clube Atlético Mineiro. Its coach is the American Mike Long. In the team's inaugural and only season as a partner with Cruzeiro, they managed to achieve a great feat and went undefeated.
