= Cuiabá Arsenal =

Brazilian football team

Cuiabá Arsernal

General information
- Founded: 2006
- Headquartered: Cuiabá, Mato Grosso, Brazil

League / conference affiliations
- AFAB (Associação de Futebol Americano do Brasil)

Current uniform
Home

Cuiabá Arsernal is a Brazilian American football team based in Cuiabá, in Mato Grosso.

It was founded in January 2006, affiliated to AFAB (Associação de Futebol Americano do Brasil).

The team's name was a tribute to the War Arsenal, a historic building in Cuiabá that today is a cultural center under the administration of the SESC Arsenal.

Cuiabá Arsenal was the champion of Brazil Bowl I. Matt Rahn, a former Arsenal import player who was also an ambassador for the team.
