= American football at the 2005 World Games =

- Venue: MSV Arena
- Dates: 15–17 July 2005
- No. of events: 1
- Competitors: 4 teams from 4 nations

American football was contested as a demonstration sport as part of the 2005 World Games. It was the first (and until 2017, only) time American football had been contested at the World Games. The events were held at the MSV-Arena in Duisburg, Germany. The semi-finals were held on July 15 and the medal games two days later. The final was won by host team Germany who beat Sweden 20–6, and the bronze medal was won by France, who beat Australia 14–0.

== Medals table ==
Gold	Silver	Bronze
Germany (GER)	Sweden (SWE)	France (FRA)

== Participants ==
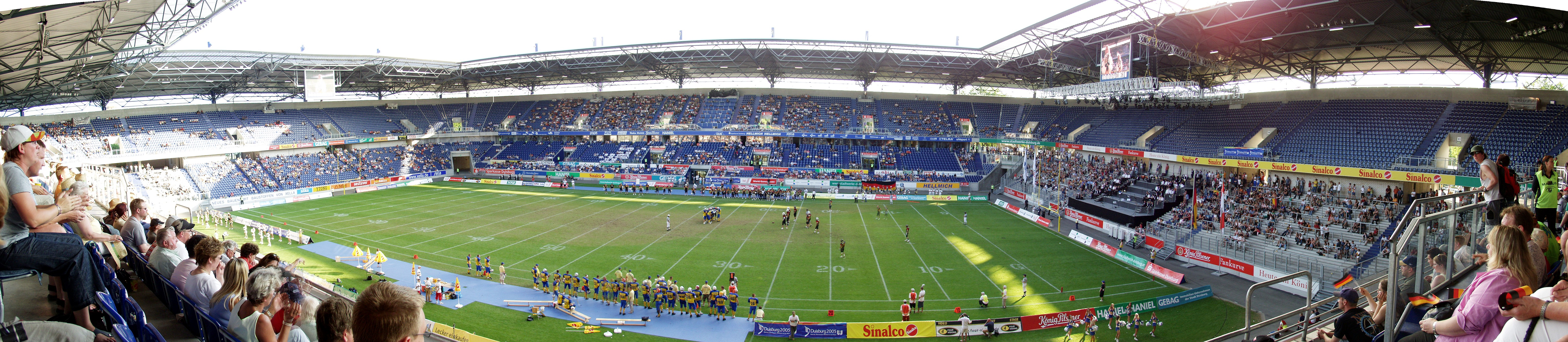
American football game during the 2005 World Games.

Four teams took part in this tournament:

- Australia
- France
- Germany (host)
- Sweden

== Bracket ==
Semi-finals
July 15 - MSV-Arena
France	7
Sweden	29
July 15 - MSV-Arena
Germany	31
Australia	0

Final
July 17 - MSV-Arena
Sweden	6
Germany	20
Third place
July 17 - MSV-Arena
France	14
Australia	0

== Details ==
=== Semifinal: France vs Sweden ===
Semifinal #1 – Sweden 29, France 7

Quarter	1	2	3	4	Total
France	0	0	0	7	7
Sweden	0	17	0	12	29

at MSV-Arena

- Date: July 15, 2005
- Game time: 1:59 p.m. CEST
- Game weather: cloudy,40% rain
- Game attendance: 1,750
- Referee: A.Olilla

Game information

Scoring
2nd Quarter

- SWE – C.Malm 58-yard pass from C.Haraldsson (J.Alnervik kick), 11:05. Sweden 7–0. Drive: 1 plays, 58 yards, 0:08.
- SWE – P.Lundqvist 37-yard interception return (J.Alnervik kick), 10:45. Sweden 14–0.
- SWE – J.Alnervik 26-yard field goal, 5:47. Sweden 17–0. Drive: 7 plays, 34 yards, 2:51.

4th Quarter

- SWE – J.Alnervik 49-yard field goal, 11:16. Sweden 20–0. Drive: 3 plays, 4 yards, 0:48.
- FRA – R.Rousset 24-yard pass from J.Franco (G.Courtois kick), 9:07. Sweden 20–7. Drive: 1 plays, 24 yards, 0:00.
- SWE – P.Lundqvist 39-yard interception return (J.Alnervik kick failed), 1:48. Sweden 26–7.
- SWE – J.Alnervik 39-yard field goal, 1:35. Sweden 29–7. Drive: 3 plays, 0 yards, 0:12.

Leading passers

- FRA – J.Franco – 14/30, 126 yards, 1 TD, 2 INT
- SWE – C.Haraldsson – 9/21, 137 yards, 1 TD, 1 INT

Leading rushers

- FRA – S.Octobre – 14 rushes, 22 yards
- SWE – K.Taalbi – 14 rushes, 48 yards

Leading receivers

- FRA – R.Rousset – 5 rec, 47 yards, 1 TD
- SWE – C.Malm – 3 rec, 68 yards, 1 TD

=== Semifinal: Germany vs Australia ===
Semifinal #2 – Germany 31, Australia 0

Quarter	1	2	3	4	Total
Germany	10	7	7	7	31
Australia	0	0	0	0	0

at MSV-Arena

- Date: July 15, 2005

=== Bronze medal game: France vs Australia ===
Bronze medal game – France 14, Australia 0

Quarter	1	2	3	4	Total
France	7	0	7	0	14
Australia	0	0	0	0	0

at MSV-Arena

- Date: July 17, 2005
- Game time: 2:04 p.m. CEST
- Game weather: sunny
- Game attendance: 5,500
- Referee: A.Olilla

Game information

Scoring
1st Quarter

- FRA – L.Marceline 1-yard run (G.Courtois kick), 7:13. France 7–0. Drive: 1 plays, 31 yards, 0:07.

3rd Quarter

- FRA – D.Signori 4-yard pass from J.Franco (G.Courtois kick), 5:21. France 14–0. Drive: 9 plays, 59 yards, 5:15.

Leading passers

- FRA – J.Franco – 2/9, 6 yards, 1 TD, 1 INT
- AUS – B.Newton – 8/18, 111 yards

Leading rushers

- FRA – L.Marceline – 13 rushes, 112 yards, 1 TD
- AUS – A.Asher – 9 rushes, 10 yards

Leading receivers

- FRA – D.Signori – 1 rec, 4 yards, 1 TD
- AUS – P.Raveloson – 3 rec, 57 yards

=== The Final: Sweden vs Germany ===
Final – Germany 20, Sweden 6

Quarter	1	2	3	4	Total
Sweden	3	0	3	0	6
Germany	0	0	7	13	20

at MSV-Arena

- Date: July 17, 2005
- Game time: 5:59 p.m. CEST
- Game weather: light clouds
- Game attendance: 16,005
- Referee: M.Introini

Game information

Scoring
1st Quarter

- SWE – J.Alnervik 33-yard field goal, 5:42. Sweden 3–0. Drive: 10 plays, 55 yards, 6:18.

3rd Quarter

- SWE – J.Alnervik 29-yard field goal, 7:22. Sweden 6–0. Drive: 10 plays, 43 yards, 4:18.
- GER – M.Biedenkapp 65-yard pass from J.Ullrich (M.Biedenkapp kick), 6:21. Germany 7–6. Drive: 3 plays, 80 yards, 1:01.

4th Quarter

- GER – M.Biedenkapp 38-yard field goal, 9:19. Germany 10–6. Drive: 6 plays, 4 yards, 2:30.
- GER – C.Poschmann 33-yard pass from J.Ullrich (M.Biedenkapp kick), 4:42. Germany 17–6. Drive: 6 plays, 55 yards, 2:36.
- GER – M.Biedenkapp 34-yard field goal, 2:28. Germany 20–6. Drive: 3 plays, 2 yards, 1:24.

Leading passers

- SWE – C.Haraldsson – 11/30, 100 yards, 1 INT
- GER – J.Ullrich – 11/25, 210 yards, 2 TD, 2 INT

Leading rushers

- SWE – K.Taalbi – 22 rushes, 75 yards
- GER – M.Falkowski – 5 rushes, 22 yards

Leading receivers

- SWE – O.Dahlman – 5 rec, 49 yards
- GER – M.Biedenkapp – 1 rec, 65 yards, 1 TD

== See also ==
- American football at the World Games
- American football at the 1932 Summer Olympics
