= American football at the 1932 Summer Olympics =

American football (demonstration) at the Games of the X Olympiad
- Venue: Los Angeles Memorial Coliseum
- Dates: August 8, 1932

American football was a demonstration sport at the 1932 Summer Olympics in Los Angeles. On the evening of August 8, 1932, seniors from three Western universities (Cal, Stanford, and USC) were matched against those from the East Coast's "Big Three" (Harvard, Yale, and Princeton). In front of 60,000 spectators at the Los Angeles Memorial Coliseum, the West team won by a score of 7–6. All-American Gaius "Gus" Shaver from USC was the captain of the West team and the game's leading rusher with 145 yards on 16 attempts. The football game at the 1932 Summer Olympics, combined with a similar demonstration game at 1933 World's Fair, led to the College All-Star Game which was an important factor in the growth of professional football in the United States.

== Origins ==
The game was originally proposed by organizers as an "intersectional" match-up between the defending national champions, University of Southern California, on the West Coast and East Coast stalwarts, Yale University. USC coach/former Yale coach Howard Jones delivered a confidential proposal from the President of the Organizing Committee for the 1932 Summer Olympics, William May Garland, to the President of Yale University, James Rowland Angell, inviting Yale to play in the game. On the heels of the 1929 Carnegie Report which decried various aspects of professionalism within college football, Angell reluctantly turned down the invitation. Although unable to secure a USC/Yale match-up and determined that football be a demonstration sport, the organizers "settled" on a game consisting of all-stars who would have graduated by the Olympic games.

== Game summary ==
1932 Summer Olympics demonstration game – West 7, East 6

Quarter	1	2	3	4	Total
West	0	0	0	7	7
East	0	0	0	6	6

at Los Angeles Memorial Coliseum

- Date: August 8, 1932
- Game attendance: 41,643

Game information

Scoring

- East – Burton Strange fumble return (kick blocked)
- West – Gus Shaver 1 yard run (Ed Kirwan kick)

Leading rushers

- West – Gus Shaver – 16 rushes, 145 yards
- East – Eddie Mays – 10 rushes, 100 yards

Officials

- Referee: Herb Dana
- Umpire: Ed Cochran
- Head Linesman: Bruce Kirkpatrick
- Field Judge: Horace Gillette

The game was scoreless until early in the fourth quarter. When a field goal attempt by the East fell short, (Note: Ray Schmidt's recap states that the missed field goal was attempted by Ed Rotan, but the official Olympic report states that it was attempted by Eddie Mays.) Shaver and another player from the West muffed the ball in an attempt to pick it up. According to various reports, Burton Strange from the East either carried the loose ball across the goal line or simply fell on it in the end zone to give his team a 6–0 lead. Eddie Mays' extra point kick was blocked. With three minutes left in the game, Shaver scored over the right tackle to tie the game at 6–6, and Ed Kirwan's conversion put the West in the lead for good.

== Participants ==
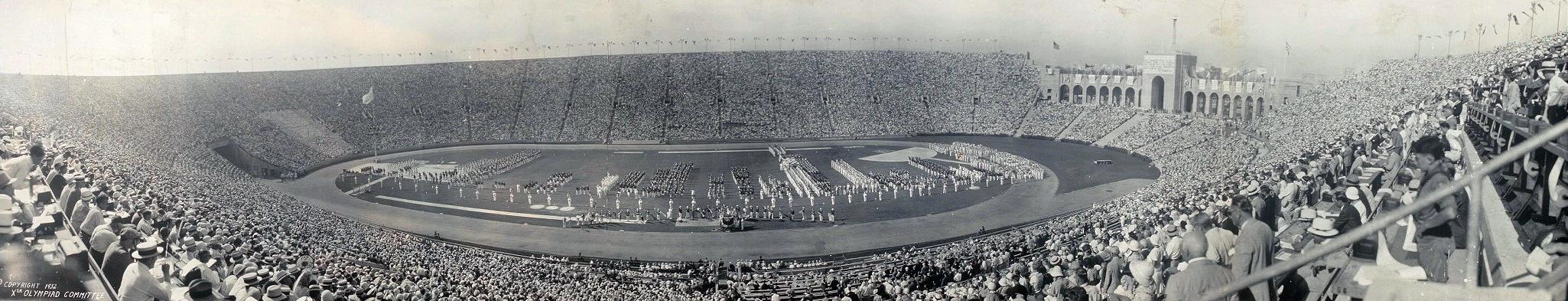
As that year's Olympic Stadium, the Los Angeles Memorial Coliseum hosted an all-star match-up of college football players at the 1932 Summer Olympics.

Like the other Olympic athletes, players for both teams lived in the Olympic Village. The starters for the West team consisted of six USC players, star halfback Rudy Rintala and two others from Stanford, and two from California. The starting line-up for the East team was four players from Harvard and seven from Yale. A number of College Football Hall of Famers elected not to play in the game. All-American Albie Booth of Yale as well as Erny Pinckert and All-American Johnny Baker of USC decided not to play when offered paying jobs in Hollywood. Barry Wood of Harvard, another All-American, was also selected to play in the demonstration, but he reportedly declined in order to concentrate on his studies.

== Rosters ==
=== West ===
West players and staff
Starters: J. Ralph Stone, LE; Robert H. Hall, LT; Peter Heiser, LG; Stanley Williamson, C; Ray Hulen, RG; Charles S. Ehrhorn, RT; Garret Arbelbide, RE; George Watkins, Q; Thomas O. Mallory, LH; Eugene C. Clark, RH; Gaius Shaver, F	Reserves: Robert B. Bartlett; Raymond E. Dawson; Louis F. DiResta; Raymond East; Edwin Harry Griffiths; Harold E. Hammack; Milton N. Hand; Edward J. Kirwan; William Marks; Frank W. Medanich; Philip Neill; Kenneth M. Reynolds; Rudolph Rintala; Philip Wilson	Chairman of Coaching Committee: Howard Jones (Southern California); Advisory Coaches: Pop Warner (Stanford); Bill Ingram (California); Bill Anderson (Occidental); Medical Supervisor: Dr. Walter R. Fieseler; Manager of Football Demonstration and West Team: J. Phil Ellsworth

=== East ===
East players and staff
Starters: Thomas P. Hawley, LE; Pierre Bouscaren, LT; Jr. Henry Meyerson, LG; Benjamin C. Betner, Jr., C; Edward Rotan, RG; Arthur S. Hall, RT; Herster Barres, RE; Bernard D. White, Q; Edmund A. Mays, LH; Albert Thomas Taylor, RH; John F. Schereschewsky, F	Reserves: John W. Crickard; Hans Ivar Flygare; Walter H. Gahagan Jr.; Francis H. Kales; Lea Langdon, Jr.; John C. Madden; John Muhlfeld; Harold Carl Sandburg; Albert Burton Strange; Kay Todd, Jr.; Casper Wister; William H. Yeckley; Frederick Robert Zundel	Chairman of Coaching Committee: Tad Jones (former Yale coach); Advisory Coaches: Mal Stevens (Yale); Henry W. Clark (Harvard); Nelson Poe (Princeton); Line Coach: Adam Walsh (Yale); Trainer: George Connors (Yale); Manager: Harold F. Woodcock (Yale)

== See also ==
- American football at the Summer Olympics
