= Robb Butler =

American football player (born 1981)

No. 45, 3
- Position: Defensive back

Personal information
- Born: September 14, 1981 (age 45); Pittsburgh, Pennsylvania, U.S.
- Listed height: 6 ft 0 in (1.83 m)
- Listed weight: 217 lb (98 kg)

Career information
- High school: Perry Traditional (Pittsburgh)
- College: Pittsburgh (1999–2000); Robert Morris (2001–2003)
- NFL draft: 2004: undrafted

Career history
- San Diego Chargers (2004); Baltimore Ravens (2005); Kansas City Chiefs (2007)*; Kansas City Brigade (2008); Erie RiverRats (2008); Wheeling Wildcats (2009)
- * Offseason or practice squad member only

Awards and highlights
- First-team Division I-AA All-American (2003)
- Stats at Pro Football Reference
- Stats at ArenaFan.com

Robb-Davon Butler (born September 14, 1981) is an American former professional football player who was a defensive back for one season with the San Diego Chargers of the National Football League (NFL). He was a three-year letterman in both football and track at Perry Traditional Academy in Pittsburgh, Pennsylvania. He earned All-State honors in football for his senior year in 1998. Butler played college football at Pittsburgh for two years as a cornerback. He then transferred to Robert Morris and played wide receiver. He redshirted his first season and caught 29 passes for 459 yards his second season. Butler converted to strong safety his senior season in 2003 and earned first-team Division I-AA All-American honors. After going undrafted in the 2004 NFL draft, he signed with the Chargers. He played in five games for the Chargers in 2004, recording seven total tackles and two kickoff returns. He later spent time with the Baltimore Ravens, Kansas City Chiefs, Kansas City Brigade, Erie RiverRats and Wheeling Wildcats.

== Early life ==
Butler was a three-year letterman at Perry Traditional Academy in Pittsburgh, Pennsylvania, where he played receiver and defensive back. He earned first-team Associated Press Big School All-State honors in 1998. He was named to the 1999 AAA Pennsylvania Big 33 Team, which participated in the Big 33 Classic on July 24, 1999. Butler was named to the 1998 Pittsburgh Post-Gazette "Fabulous 22" Team. He was also named to the Pittsburgh Tribune-Review/Fox Sports Pittsburgh "Terrific 25" Team. He gained first-team All-Pittsburgh City League recognition twice as well.

Butler recorded 35 receptions for 631 yards his senior year and scored 14 total touchdowns, including two punt returns, two kick returns and one interception return for a touchdown. He accumulated six interceptions during his junior year and six interceptions in his senior season as well. He helped the team win the City League championship in 1997 and 1998. The team advanced to the PIAA Class AAA state championship game in 1997 but lost.

Butler also lettered three years in track and field at Perry. He played football with future Pittsburgh Panthers teammate Rod Rutherford at Perry.

Butler visited Pittsburgh, Maryland, Michigan State, Wisconsin and NC State before choosing Pittsburgh. He signed his letter of intent on February 7, 1999.

== College career ==
Butler played college football for the Pittsburgh Panthers of the University of Pittsburgh from 1999 to 2000 and lettered both years. He was a reserve cornerback and special teams contributor each year. He played in the final eight games of the 1999 season, recording five solo tackles, five tackle assists and two passes defended. On November 13, 1999, Butler broke up a pass in the end zone on the final play in the history of Pitt Stadium. He played in ten games during his sophomore year in 2000, totaling three solo tackles and two tackle assists. After the 2000 season, he had transitioned to wide receiver after spending time, and impressing, on the scout squad at receiver.

Butler then transferred to Robert Morris University in August 2001, but had to sit out the 2001 season. He played in 20 games, all starts, for the Robert Morris Colonials from 2002 to 2003. He caught 29 passes for a team-leading 459 yards in 2002. Butler converted to strong safety in 2003. He accumulated 84 tackles, two interceptions, nine pass breakups, and two forced fumbles for the Colonials during the 2003 season, earning him first-team Division I-AA All-American honors.

== Professional career ==
Butler signed with the San Diego Chargers of the National Football League (NFL) on April 25, 2004, after going undrafted in the 2004 NFL draft, becoming the fifth player in Robert Morris history to sign an NFL contract. He was released by the Chargers on September 5 and signed to the team's practice squad the following day. He was promoted to the active roster of the Chargers on November 30, 2004. Butler played in five games for the team during the 2004 season, recording three solo tackles and four tackle assists. He also returned two kickoffs for 35 yards. He was released by the Chargers on September 3, 2005.

On November 11, 2005, Butler was signed to the practice squad of the Baltimore Ravens of the NFL. He was promoted to the team's active roster on December 30. He re-signed with the Ravens on May 18, 2006. Butler was released by the team on September 2, 2006.

He had a workout with the New England Patriots of the NFL in December 2006. He signed a two-year contract with the NFL's Kansas City Chiefs on February 12, 2007. Butler was released by the Chiefs on September 2, 2007.

He signed with the Kansas City Brigade of the Arena Football League on November 29, 2007. He was released by the team on February 16, 2008, signed by the Brigade on March 18 and placed on recallable waivers nine days later. The Brigade signed Butler to the team's practice squad on April 2 and promoted him to the active roster on April 12. He was placed on recallable waivers on April 29, signed by the Brigade on May 1 and placed on recallable waivers on May 7, 2008. Overall, he totaled eleven solo tackles, seven tackle assists and one interception for the Brigade during the 2008 season.

Butler signed with the Erie RiverRats of the American Indoor Football Association in May 2008 and played for them during the 2008 season. He played with former Perry Traditional and Pittsburgh Panthers teammate Rod Rutherford as a member of the RiverRats. Butler was signed by the Wheeling Wildcats of the Continental Indoor Football League on December 21, 2008, and played for the team during the 2009 season. He again played with Rutherford in Wheeling. Butler also played under head coach Shawn Liotta in both Erie and Wheeling.

== Personal life ==
Butler has spent time working for PPG Industries after his playing career. He earned an MBA from Olin Business School. As of 2020, Butler was the wide receivers and defensive backs coach at Calabasas High School in Calabasas, California.

His son Aaron, a four-star recruit from Calabasas High School in California, committed to the Colorado Buffaloes football team for the 2024 class.
