= Wheeling Wildcats =

Logo

General information
- Founded: 2008
- Folded: 2009
- Headquartered: Wheeling, West Virginia at the WesBanco Arena
- Colors: Orange, purple, white

Personnel
- Head coach: Shawn Liotta (2009)
- President: Dave Bender

Team history
- Wheeling Wildcats (2009)

Home fields
- WesBanco Arena (2009)

League / conference affiliations
- Continental Indoor Football League (2009): East Division (2009)

The Wheeling Wildcats were a professional indoor football team located in Wheeling, West Virginia. The team began play in the Continental Indoor Football League during the 2009 season as an expansion team. The Wildcats were the second indoor football team to be based in Wheeling. The team filled the void left by the demise of the Ohio Valley Greyhounds, who played their final down of football in 2007. The owner of the Wildcats was Dave Bender. The Wildcats played their home games at WesBanco Arena in Wheeling.

== Franchise history ==
In March 2008, it was announced that indoor football would be returning to Wheeling, West Virginia. Owner Dave Bender was debating on putting the team in Elmira, New York, but when he saw the opportunity to Wheeling, he couldn't pass it up. Bender also cited that the location of teams in the league were a large part of why the Wildcats joined the CIFL. The team tried to establish rivalries, challenging the Rochester Raiders to play the Wildcats in the Raiders' first home game. However, the Raiders have since left the CIFL for the newly established Indoor Football League, leaving the challenge unanswerable. In August, the team announced the signing of head coach Shawn Liotta, who had been coaching the Erie RiverRats of the American Indoor Football Association. In December 2008, the Wildcats announced the signing of former University of Pittsburgh standout quarterback, Rod Rutherford. The team also signed former NFL and Arena Football League player, Robb Butler to play receiver. With both Rutherford and Butler player together for Liotta in Erie the year before, the team's offense had high expectations. The Wildcats, as well as the rest of the CIFL, had an opportunity to get a higher caliber player in 2009, as the Arena Football League suspending its 2010 season. The reason that many of the AFL players did not make it onto the Wildcats roster was largely that the players wanted more money than the CIFL would allow.

The Wildcats inaugural season began with a 55−47 road loss to the Marion Mayhem. Two weeks later, the Wildcats played their first home game against the Fort Wayne Freedom. The Freedom offense put on a good display, scoring on every drive except one, en route to defeating the Wildcats 49-34. The following week the Chicago Slaughter came to WesBanco Arena. The undefeated Slaughter had signed several of the Chicago Rush's players who were looking for a place to play with the AFL suspension. The Slaughter defeated the Wildcats 67-59. Four weeks into their season, the Wildcats were 0-4, and faced the also winless Miami Valley Silverbacks. The Wildcats were able to work out their first win against the traveling Silverbacks. The Wildcats defeated the Silverbacks again three weeks later to make their record 2–6. The Wildcats lost their remaining four games of the season to Marion, Rock River, Fort Wayne and Wisconsin. Despite having a good roster, including several NFL, AFL and division one college players, and David Dinkins (who had previously played for AIFA teams in Erie, Pennsylvania, and won the 2005 AIFA MVP), the Wildcats went 2-10 and folded after one season. Liotta, Rutherford and Dinkins returned to Erie in 2010.

=== Schedule ===
Week	Date	Kickoff	Opponent	Results		Game site
Week	Date	Kickoff	Opponent	Final score	Team record	Game site
1	Bye					
2	March 13	7:30 P.M. EDT	at Marion Mayhem	L 47-55	0-1	Veterans Memorial Coliseum
3	Bye					
4	March 28	7:30 P.M. EDT	Fort Wayne Freedom	L 34-49	0-2	WesBanco Arena
5	April 4	7:30 P.M. EDT	Chicago Slaughter	L 59-67	0-3	WesBanco Arena
6	April 11	7:30 P.M. EDT	at Milwaukee Bonecrushers	L 32-34	0-4	U.S. Cellular Arena
7	April 19	7:30 P.M. EDT	Miami Valley Silverbacks	W 52-28	1-4	WesBanco Arena
8	April 25	7:30 P.M. EDT	Marion Mayhem	L 57-61	1-5	WesBanco Arena
9	May 2	7:30 P.M. EDT	at Chicago Slaughter	L 38-61	1-6	Sears Centre
10	May 9	7:30 P.M. EDT	Miami Valley Silverbacks	W 33-13	2-6	WesBanco Arena
11	May 16	7:30 P.M. EDT	at Marion Mayhem	L 24-54	2-7	Veterans Memorial Coliseum
12	May 23	7:30 P.M. EDT	Rock River Raptors	L 34-46	2-8	WesBanco Arena
13	May 29	7:30 P.M. EDT	at Fort Wayne Freedom	L 42-82	2-9	Allen County War Memorial Coliseum
14	June 6	7:30 P.M. EDT	Wisconsin Wolfpack	L 46-49	2-10	WesBanco Arena

=== 2009 CIFL standings ===
2009 Continental Indoor Football League
Team	Overall				Division			
Team	W	L	T	PCT	W	L	T	PCT
East Division
Marion Mayhem-y	9	3	0	.750	8	1	0	.889
Fort Wayne Freedom-x	6	5	0	.545	5	2	0	.294
Wheeling Wildcats	2	10	0	.167	2	5	0	.286
Miami Valley Silverbacks	0	10	0	.000	0	7	0	.000
West Division
Chicago Slaughter-y	12	0	0	1.000	8	0	0	1.000
Wisconsin Wolfpack-x	7	5	0	.583	4	4	0	.500
Rock River Raptors	7	5	0	.583	3	5	0	.167
Milwaukee Bonecrushers	3	8	0	.273	1	7	0	.167

== Logos and uniforms ==
After deciding against using the Greyhounds name, and when "Ironmen" nickname (a nod to the city's former Continental Football League team) was unavailable, a naming contest was announced. Out of 175 entries, the name Wildcats was chosen.

== Notable players ==
=== Roster ===
Wheeling Wildcats roster
Quarterbacks: -- Rod Rutherford; Running backs: currently vacant; Wide receivers: -- Eugene Baker; -- Robb Butler; -- David Dinkins	Offensive linemen: -- Levon Barlow; -- Jamar Foulks; -- Ron Idoko; Defensive linemen: -- Phil Tillman	Linebackers: -- Boo McLee; -- Glenroy Watkins; Defensive backs: -- Vaughn Rivers; -- Eric Wicks; Kickers: currently vacant	Injured reserve: currently vacant; Exempt List: currently vacant; Practice squad: currently vacant; rookies in italics updated June 5, 2012; 12 Active, 0 Inactive, 0 PS

== Head coaches ==
Name	Term	Regular season				Playoffs		Awards
Name	Term	W	L	T	Win%	W	L	Awards
Shawn Liotta	2009	2	10	0	.167	0	0	

== Season-by-season results ==
League champions	Conference champions	Division champions	Wild card berth	League leader

Season	Team	League	Conference	Division	Regular season				Postseason results
Season	Team	League	Conference	Division	Finish	Wins	Losses	Ties	Postseason results
2009	2009	CIFL		East	3rd	2	10	0	
Totals						2	10	0	All-time regular season record (2009)
Totals						0	0	-	All-time postseason record (2009)
Totals						2	10	0	All-time regular season and postseason record (2009)
