= Derrick Shepard (defensive lineman) =

American football player, coach, and executive (born 1975)

Profile
- Position: Defensive lineman

Personal information
- Born: May 29, 1975 (age 51); Dayton, Ohio, U.S.
- Listed height: 6 ft 2 in (1.88 m)
- Listed weight: 300 lb (136 kg)

Career information
- High school: Dayton (OH) Meadowdale
- College: Georgia Tech
- NFL draft: 1998: undrafted

Career history

Playing
- Miami Dolphins (1998)*; New England Patriots (1999)*; Arizona Rattlers (2000–2001); Detroit Fury (2001); Tennessee Valley Vipers (2002); Cincinnati Swarm (2003); Louisville Fire (2004–2006); Dayton Warbirds (2006); Miami Valley Silverbacks (2010)
- * Offseason or practice squad member only

Coaching
- Miami Valley Silverbacks (2009) (Head coach); Miami Valley Silverbacks (2010) (Offensive/Defensive line coach); Dayton Silverbacks (2011) (Head coach); Dayton Silverbacks/Sharks (2012–2014) (Defensive line coach); Dayton Wolfpack (2017 pre-season) (Head coach)

Operations
- Dayton Silverbacks (2012) (Public Relations)

Career AFL statistics
- Tackles: 5.5
- Sacks: 3
- Stats at ArenaFan.com

Derrick L. Shepard is an American former arena and indoor football defensive lineman. Shepard grew up in Dayton, Ohio, and attended Meadowdale High School. His football ability earned him a scholarship to Georgia Tech, where he participated in football for four years.

After spending two years in training camps with the Miami Dolphins and New England Patriots, Shepard began playing arena football. He played for the Arizona Rattlers and the Detroit Fury, before playing his next 5 years in af2 with the Tennessee Valley Vipers, Cincinnati Swarm and the Louisville Fire. After playing professionally for 9 years, Shepard became a coach of indoor football for the Miami Valley Silverbacks. He had been the Silverbacks Head Coach, as well as offensive and defensive line coach. In 2011, he led the Silverbacks to a .500 winning percentage, at the time a Silverbacks record.

== Early life ==
He attended Meadowdale High School in Dayton, Ohio.

== College career ==
Upon his graduation, Shepard received a scholarship to play football at Georgia Tech. Shepard redshirted during his first season for Head Coach, Bill Lewis. Shepard saw very little playing time under coach Lewis, who was fired after a 1–7 start to the 1994 season. George O'Leary replaced Lewis for the remaining three games, which Shepard started all three. During his junior year, Shepard scored the first touchdown of his life at any level, when he recovered a fumble and returned it 27 yards for a touchdown, which turned out to be the game winning score in a 28–16 game versus N.C. State. His senior season he had one interception that he return 68 yards. After a 1997 game against Duke, Shepard was named the ACC Defensive Player of the Week.

=== Statistics ===
Season	Team	GS	GP	Solo	Ast	Total	FF	FR	PBU	Pres	TFL	SACK	INT
1997	Georgia Tech	12	12	–	–	–	–	–	–	–	–	–	–
1996	Georgia Tech	11	11	34	23	57	0	2	3	12	6.0	4.0	1
1995	Georgia Tech	11	7	17	22	39	0	3	3	22	4.0	1.0	0
1994	Georgia Tech	6	4	8	7	15	0	1	0	0	0	0	0
	Totals	40	34	59	52	111	0	6	6	34	10.0	5.0	1

== Professional career ==
After not hearing his named called in the 1998 NFL draft, Shepard signed as an undrafted free agent with the Miami Dolphins.

In 1999, Shepard signed as a free agent with the New England Patriots. He was waived on August 1, 1999.

In 2000, Shepard tried his hand at Arena football, signing with the Arizona Rattlers of the Arena Football League. He recorded 4.5 tackles, 1 sack and two pass breakups on the season.

On April 11, 2001, Shepard was traded to the Detroit Fury for Kelvin Ingram. He played in just one game, recording a sack. He was waived on June 20, 2001.

In 2002, Shepard played for the Tennessee Valley Vipers of the af2.

In 2003, Shepard played with the Cincinnati Swarm also of the af2.

In 2004, Shepard joined the Louisville Fire, also of the af2. On August 11, 2004, Shepard scored the game-winning touchdown against the Quad City Steamwheelers in a 53–48 game.

He was a member of the Dayton Warbirds in 2006.

In 2010, Shepard was an offensive and defensive line coach for the Miami Valley Silverbacks. His former teammate, Brian Wells was hired as the team's head coach in 2010, and he convinced Shepard to suit up for the Silverbacks. Shepard appeared in just a single game, recording one tackle on the season.

== Coaching career ==
=== Miami Valley/Dayton Silverbacks ===
In 2008, Shepard was named the head coach of the Miami Valley Silverbacks for the 2009 season. The Silverbacks went 0–10 and decided they would not retain Shepard as head coach.

In 2010, the Silverbacks hired a former teammate and coach of Shephard's in Brian Wells. Wells signed Shepard as a player for the Silverbacks, but after just one game, Shepard joined the coaching staff working with the offensive and defensive lines.

In 2011, Shepard returned to the role of head coach for the Silverbacks, as they had found a new home at Hara Arena in Dayton, Ohio. Shepard led the Silverbacks to a 5–5 record and earned the team their second-straight playoff berth. Their .500 winning percentage for the season was a Silverbacks record, until it was broken in 2012. Following the 2011 season, Shepard resigned as the Silverbacks head coach.

In 2012, Shepard was once again the offensive and defensive line coach for the Silverbacks. He also received a role in the front office as the public relations director.

=== Dayton Wolfpack ===
On December 31, 2016, the National Arena League announced Shepard would the first head coach their Dayton expansion team, the Dayton Wolfpack. However, the team would fail to secure a lease for a home arena in time for the season and travelling team based out of Atlanta, Georgia, took on the mantle of the Wolfpack for the 2017 season and Shepard is no longer involved with the team.

=== Head coaching record ===
Team	Year	Regular season					Postseason			
Team	Year	Won	Lost	Ties	Win %	Finish	Won	Lost	Win %	Result
MV	2009	0	10	0	.000	6th in CIFL	0	0	.000	
DAY	2011	5	5	0	.500	3rd in CIFL	0	1	.000	Lost to Marion Blue Racers in CIFL Semi-Final
MV/DAY total		5	15	0	.250		0	1	.000	
Total		5	15	0	.250		0	1	.000	
