= 2009 Miami Valley Silverbacks season =

- Head coach: Derrick Shepard
- Home stadium: Hobart Arena

Results
- Record: 0–10
- Division place: 4th
- Playoffs: DNQ

The 2009 Miami Valley Silverbacks season was the fourth season for the Continental Indoor Football League (CIFL) franchise. The Silverbacks planned on sitting out the 2009 CIFL season, but due to the West Virginia Wild getting suspended from the league, the CIFL offered for the Silverbacks to take the place of the Wild. They had been scheduled to play a 12-game season, primarily as a traveling team, only playing two home games at Hobart Arena, but two of their road games were cancelled. The team hired Derrick Shepard, a former NFL and Arena Football League defensive tackle, to coach the team. On April 14, the Silverbacks announced that a majority of their remaining 2009 season games were to be broadcast live online for free on MCP-TV at www.miamicountypost.com. Professional sports announcer JT Szabo provided the play-by-play. The team finished with a franchise-worst record of 0–10, failing to make the playoffs for the third straight season.

== Schedule ==
Date	Opponent	Home/Away	Result
March 27	Marion Mayhem	Away	Lost 0–55
April 4	Milwaukee Bonecrushers	Away	CANCELLED
April 11	Rock River Raptors	Away	Lost 14–41
April 19	Wheeling Wildcats	Home	Lost 28–52
April 25	Fort Wayne Freedom	Away	Lost 28–34
May 2	Marion Mayhem	Away	Lost 2–36
May 9	Wheeling Wildcats	Away	Lost 13–33
May 17	Fort Wayne Freedom	Home	Lost 28–56
May 23	Wisconsin Wolfpack	Away	Lost 30–53
May 30	Milwaukee Bonecrushers	Away	Lost 32–40
June 6	Fort Wayne Freedom	Away	CANCELLED
June 13	Marion Mayhem	Away	Lost 20–53

== 2009 standings ==
2009 Continental Indoor Football League
Team	Overall				Division			
Team	W	L	T	PCT	W	L	T	PCT
East Division
Marion Mayhem-y	9	3	0	.750	8	1	0	.889
Fort Wayne Freedom-x	6	5	0	.545	5	2	0	.294
Wheeling Wildcats	2	10	0	.167	2	5	0	.286
Miami Valley Silverbacks	0	10	0	.000	0	7	0	.000
West Division
Chicago Slaughter-y	12	0	0	1.000	8	0	0	1.000
Wisconsin Wolfpack-x	7	5	0	.583	4	4	0	.500
Rock River Raptors	7	5	0	.583	3	5	0	.167
Milwaukee Bonecrushers	3	8	0	.273	1	7	0	.167
