= Maurice Lee =

American football player (born 1980)

Profile
- Position: Wide receiver

Personal information
- Born: 1980 (age 45–46); Cleveland, Ohio, U.S.
- Listed height: 5 ft 9 in (1.75 m)
- Listed weight: 185 lb (84 kg)

Career information
- High school: South (Cleveland)
- College: Ohio State
- NFL draft: 2004: undrafted

Career history
- Dayton Warbirds (2005); Miami Valley Silverbacks (2006–2008); Canton Legends* (2007); Marion Mayhem (2009); Cincinnati Commandos (2011–2012)
- * Offseason or practice squad member only

Awards and highlights
- 3× First-team AIFL All-Star (2006, 2007, 2008); First-team NIFL All-Star (2005); BCS national champion (2002)

Maurice 'Moe' Lee (born 1980) is an American former football wide receiver.

== Early life ==
Lee attended South High School where he was an option quarterback who was rated the number one athlete in the state of Ohio and one of the top recruits in the nation.

== College career ==
The 5-foot-9, 185-pound Lee was recruited to Ohio State as a receiver. He played for the Buckeyes from 1999 to 2003. In that time he was tossed back-and-forth from receiver to defensive back.

Lee was a part of the 2002 National Championship team at Ohio State University. He played with the Buckeyes from 1999 to 2003. He received his B.A. in education/sports and leisure studies, Spring 2004. He also received his master's degree in Sport Management, Fall 2011 at American Military University (Online), and Educational Leadership, Spring 2021 at Ashland University.

== Professional career ==
In 2005, Lee signed to play for the Dayton Warbirds and led the National Indoor Football League in all purpose yards and was a first team All-Star selection.

Lee also grabbed first team All-Star selections in the AIFA and the AIFL. As a member of the Miami Valley Silverbacks in 2005, Lee broke the league's single game record for receptions, yards, and touchdown receptions. Moe had 15 catches for 191 yards and 6 touchdowns to set the record. Later that season he broke his own records with 17 catches for 197 yards and 7 touchdowns. Lee finished the season with 90 catches for 1,385 yards and 29 touchdowns and was voted to the All-Star Team.

On December 28, 2010, it was announced that Lee had come out of his year off and signed with the Cincinnati Commandos of the Continental Indoor Football League. Lee went on to play in 4 games and collected 13 catches, for 216 yards and 4 touchdowns.
