= 2009 Wisconsin Wolfpack season =

- Head coach: Jordan Kopac
- Home stadium: Veterans Memorial Coliseum; 1919 Alliant Energy Coliseum Way; Madison, WI 53713

Results
- Record: 7-5
- League place: 2nd
- Playoffs: Lost in the Chicago Slaughter

The 2009 Wisconsin Wolfpack season was the first season for the Continental Indoor Football League (CIFL) franchise. Prior to the Wolfpack franchise's 2008 outdoor campaign, the Milwaukee Bonecrushers of the Continental Indoor Football League approached the Wolfpack coaches and staff and asked them to assist with the completion of their 2008 season following Gilbert Brown's decision to resign as head coach and the resulting resignation of most of the Bonecrushers' staff. Kopac assumed the role of general manager for the Bonecrushers, and brought with him the core coaches of the Wolfpack outdoor team that would later become the core of the Wolfpack indoor team. Kopac led the team to its only win, a 51-46 victory of the Muskegon Thunder.

With infrastructure already in place from the outdoor team, and following the previous year's experience with the Bonecrushers, Wolfpack management announced in early 2009 it would field both indoor and outdoor teams that year. To start the indoor team, Kopac coordinated with Lowe Entertainment, owners of the Rock River Raptors, also in the CIFL, to have Lowe run the indoor franchise while retaining Kopac as head coach. The Wolfpack were Madison's second indoor football franchise and the first to call Madison home since the Madison Mad Dogs folded in 2001.

The Wolfpack played its inaugural season's home games at the Veterans Memorial Coliseum on the campus of the Alliant Energy Center and used AstroTurf previously belonging to the Pensacola Barracudas of AF2. In its inaugural season, the team finished 7-5 and qualified for the CIFL Playoffs, The team started 5-1 but struggled late in the season after former All-American UW-Platteville quarterback Tom Stetzer was lost to injury. The Wolfpack would fall to the eventual undefeated CIFL champion Chicago Slaughter in the 2009 CIFL Western Conference Championship Game, 63-19.

== Schedule ==
Date	Opponent	Home/Away	Result
March 7	Rock River Raptors	Away	Won, 40-38
March 21	Chicago Slaughter	Home	Lost, 36-40
March 28	Milwaukee Bonecrushers	Away	Won, 36-20
April 4	Rock River Raptors	Home	Won, 50-23
April 10	Fort Wayne Freedom	Home	Won, 38-34
April 25	Rock River Raptors	Away	Lost, 21-25
May 2	Milwaukee Bonecrushers	Home	Won, 69-26
May 9	Marion Mayhem	Home	Lost, 19-59
May 16	Chicago Slaughter	Away	Lost, 22-67
May 23	Miami Valley Silverbacks	Home	Won, 53-30
May 30	Chicago Slaughter	Home	Lost, 14-49
June 6	Wheeling Wildcats	Away	Won, 49-46
June 20	Chicago Slaughter (Western Division Championship)	Away	Lost, 19-63

== Roster ==
The Wolfpack started pre-season training camp with 40 players. The 25 man Roster was announced on March 1, 2009.

== Roster ==
2009 Wisconsin Wolfpack roster
Quarterbacks: -- Tom Stetzer; Offensive backs: 21 Derrick Brown; 3 Eric Donoval; Receivers: -- Reggie Davis; 6 Marques Johnson; -- Ric Levy; 5 Will Norwood	Offensive linemen: 14 Rob Gilbreath; -- Mike Sherman; -- Scott Tyrcha; Defensive linemen: -- Bobby Langston; 34 Kurt Ware; -- James Washington; -- Eric Zilisch	Linebackers: 27 Jim Cichon; Defensive backs: -- Derek Brown; -- George Carpenter; -- Sam D'Alie; -- Zak Gordon; -- Matt Helgemo; -- Corey Roberson; -- Gabe Schultz; Kickers: -- Paul Schroeder	Inactive: Currently vacant; Injured reserve: Currently vacant; Rookies in italics; Roster updated March 1, 2009; 23 Active, 0 Inactive

== Standings ==
2009 Continental Indoor Football League
Team	Overall				Division			
Team	W	L	T	PCT	W	L	T	PCT
East Division
Marion Mayhem-y	9	3	0	.750	8	1	0	.889
Fort Wayne Freedom-x	6	5	0	.545	5	2	0	.294
Wheeling Wildcats	2	10	0	.167	2	5	0	.286
Miami Valley Silverbacks	0	10	0	.000	0	7	0	.000
West Division
Chicago Slaughter-y	12	0	0	1.000	8	0	0	1.000
Wisconsin Wolfpack-x	7	5	0	.583	4	4	0	.500
Rock River Raptors	7	5	0	.583	3	5	0	.167
Milwaukee Bonecrushers	3	8	0	.273	1	7	0	.167
