= 2009 Milwaukee Bonecrushers season =

CIFL season

- Head coach: LeRoy McFadden; John Burns
- Home stadium: U.S. Cellular Arena

Results
- Record: 3-8
- Division place: 4th
- Playoffs: DNQ

The 2009 Milwaukee Bonecrushers season was the 2nd season for the Continental Indoor Football League (CIFL) franchise. The Bonecrushers returned to action in 2009 with renewed optimism after signing LeRoy McFadden, brother of NFL player Darren McFadden, as its new head coach, as well as the previous year's CIFL Offensive Player of the Year, Randy Bell. However, McFadden also chose to resign after just three games, leaving assistant coach, John Burns, to take over as head coach. While the Bonecrushers survived the 2009 season in Milwaukee, and in spite of bringing in top announcer Dennis J. O'Boyle to handle the public address and master of ceremonies duties at the U.S. Cellular Arena, attendance dwindled to nearly nothing and the team finished with a record of 3-8.

== Schedule ==
Date	Opponent	Home/Away	Result
March 6	Chicago Slaughter	Away	Lost 24-84
March 20	Rock River Raptors	Away	Won 53 - 40
March 28	Wisconsin Wolfpack	Home	Lost 20 - 36
April 4	Miami Valley Silverbacks	TBD	PPD
April 11	Wheeling Wildcats	Home	Won 35-32
April 18	Rock River Raptors	Home	Lost 31-41
April 25	Chicago Slaughter	Away	Lost 25-78
May 2	Wisconsin Wolfpack	Away	Lost 26-69
May 9	Fort Wayne Freedom	Home	Lost 33-51
May 16	Rock River Raptors	Away	Lost 12-32
May 22	Chicago Slaughter	Home	Lost 50-70
May 30	Miami Valley Silverbacks	Home	Won 40-32

== Standings ==
2009 Continental Indoor Football League
Team	Overall				Division			
Team	W	L	T	PCT	W	L	T	PCT
East Division
Marion Mayhem-y	9	3	0	.750	8	1	0	.889
Fort Wayne Freedom-x	6	5	0	.545	5	2	0	.294
Wheeling Wildcats	2	10	0	.167	2	5	0	.286
Miami Valley Silverbacks	0	10	0	.000	0	7	0	.000
West Division
Chicago Slaughter-y	12	0	0	1.000	8	0	0	1.000
Wisconsin Wolfpack-x	7	5	0	.583	4	4	0	.500
Rock River Raptors	7	5	0	.583	3	5	0	.167
Milwaukee Bonecrushers	3	8	0	.273	1	7	0	.167
