= Dayton Silverbacks =

Indoor football team based in Dayton, Ohio

Logo

General information
- Founded: 2006
- Folded: 2012
- Headquartered: Hara Arena in Trotwood, Ohio
- Colors: Black, Green, Silver
- Mascot: Congo

Personnel
- Owner: Corwyn Thomas
- General manager: April Shellenberger
- Head coach: Matt King (2006–2007); Carl Allen (2008); Derrick Shepard (2009, 2011); Brian Wells (2010); James Scott (2012)

Team history
- Miami Valley Silverbacks (2007–2010); Dayton Silverbacks (2011–2012)

Home fields
- Hobart Arena (2006-2008); Hara Arena (2011-2012)

League / conference affiliations
- American Indoor Football Association (2006): Northern Conference; Continental Indoor Football League (2007–2012): Great Lakes Division (2007); Great Lakes Conference (2008); East Division (2008)

Playoff appearances (4)
- CIFL: 2007, 2010, 2010, 2012

The Dayton Silverbacks were a professional indoor football team based in Dayton, Ohio. The team was a member of the Continental Indoor Football League (CIFL). The franchise started as the Miami Valley Silverbacks and joined the CIFL in 2007 after playing their inaugural season as an expansion team in the American Indoor Football Association. The Silverbacks were the fourth indoor football team to be based in Dayton, the first being the Dayton Skyhawks of the original Indoor Football League. The Skyhawks were followed by the Dayton Warbirds, who later became the Dayton Bulldogs, of the National Indoor Football League and the third being the Cincinnati Marshals who played their 2007 season in Dayton. The Silverbacks played their home games at Hara Arena in nearby Trotwood, Ohio.

== Franchise history ==
=== 2006: AIFL expansion ===
The team began play in 2006 as the Miami Valley Silverbacks, an expansion member of the American Indoor Football League. On Saturday, March 25, 2006, WR/DB Maurice Lee managed to set five AIFL wide receiver records, en route to his team's 57–54 Week 5 road victory over the Steubenville Stampede. He set the records for most catches (16), most reception yards (191), most receiving touchdowns (7), most points (42), and total touchdowns (7). The team finished 5-9 in their expansion season, earning a berth in the AIFL playoffs before losing in the first round. After the season four Silverbacks were named to the AIFL ProStar Team.

=== 2007: Joining the CIFL ===
After the season, the team decided to move to the Continental Indoor Football League, along with their brother franchise, the Steubenville Stampede, signing a three-year contract with the league. Team owner Jeff Kolaczkowski cited, "This will cut down on the team's operating expenses as well as build strong rivalries." The Silverbacks had a rude welcome to the CIFL, when defending league champion, the Port Huron Pirates, defeated the Silverbacks 54-7. The team bounced back and finished with a 4-9 record and a chance to win a qualifying playoff game. They lost 60-28 to the Chicago Slaughter, failing to make the playoffs.

=== 2008 ===
In 2008, the team saw the only coach it had even known, removed himself from the position and become the team's president. His first move was to hire Carl Allen as his successor. The team finished 3-9 and had their third season in a row of declining win totals.

=== 2009: Rock bottom ===
The Silverbacks planned on sitting out the 2009 CIFL season, but due to the West Virginia Wild getting suspended from the league, the CIFL offered for the Silverbacks to take the place of the Wild. They had been scheduled to play a 12-game season, primarily as a traveling team only playing two home games at Hobart Arena, but two of their road games were cancelled. The team hired Derrick Shepard, a former NFL and Arena Football League Defensive Tackle, to coach the team. On April 14, the Silverbacks announced that a majority of their remaining 2009 season were to be broadcast live online for free on MCP-TV at www.miamicountypost.com. Professional sports announcer, JT Szabo provided the play-by-play. The team finished with a franchise worst record of 0-10, failing to make the playoffs for the 3rd straight season.

=== 2010: Return to the playoffs ===
The 2010 Silverbacks announced they will continue play in the CIFL as a full travel squad. The team named former Cincinnati Swarm (af2), Louisville Fire (af2) and Cincinnati Marshals (NIFL) assistant Brian Wells as head coach. The 2010 Silverbacks finished the regular season with, at the time, the best winning percentage in team history (.400) and their second ever playoff berth. Wells was named CIFL Coach of the Year! The Silverbacks were eliminated in the first round by the eventual CIFL Champion Cincinnati Commandos.

=== 2011 ===
In 2011, the Silverbacks saw several changes. They changed the franchise name from the "Miami Valley Silverbacks" to the "Dayton Silverbacks" and found a home arena in Hara Arena in Trotwood, Ohio. The Silverbacks brought back Derrick Shepard to coach the team after Brian Wells took a job with the Commandos. The Silverbacks continued their success from the following season, finished with a franchise best .500 winning percentage, and a second consecutive playoff appearance. They would go on to lose in the Semi-finals to the Marion Blue Racers.

=== 2012: S'Back best season ever ===
After much speculation about whether or not the Silverbacks would leave the CIFL and join the Ultimate Indoor Football League, the Silverbacks management made an announcement that they would be staying in the CIFL and helping the league rebuild after losing its top two teams from the 2011 season. Coach Derrick Shepard resigned at the end of the 2011 season. On September 8, 2011, Mister Askew was named the 6th coach in Silverbacks history. On February 9, 2012, it was announced that Silverbacks Football LLC, in which Jeff Kolaczkowski of Dayton acted as president of that organization, decided they would be stepping out of the world of football and selling the team to an ownership group. The Dayton Silverbacks were sold to MRL Sports Entertainment LLC. There are currently three members on the ownership board for MRL Sports Entertainment LLC and all three board members were current members of the Dayton Silverbacks front office staff. Those members were Michael Lause, April Shellenberger and Tyree Fields. On March 1, just ten days before the season started, the Silverback fired Head Coach Mister Askew. The reasons for his termination have yet to be determined. The team hired James Scott, a former player for the Silverbacks, and Askew's Defensive Coordinator, to be the team's Head Coach. More trouble came before the season started, as Fields left the team in all capacities, leaving only Lause and Shellenberger. Then after one week of the season, Lause left the team as well for reasons that are unknown. Shelleberger was left as the lone person in charge and eventually reached out to a silent partial owner, Corwyn Thomas, to help provide financial support to get the team through the season. Corwyn stepped in and paid the absolute bare minimum to get things done, even making the team travel in a school bus to the championship game. Despite all the off the field distractions, the Silverbacks put together the best season in franchise history, clinching a winning record for the first time ever with a 62-15 win of the Indianapolis Enforcers on April 14. The Silverbacks would finish the season 8-1, with their lone loss coming to the undefeated Saginaw Sting. Their second-place finish was critical after the CIFL cut the playoffs from 4 teams to just 2, moving the Silverbacks into the 2012 CIFL Championship Game against the Sting. Silverbacks scored just 7 points, in what was the lowest scoring CIFL Championship Game in league history, with a final score of 7-35. After all the success the team had through the season, Mr Thomas decided he didn't want to continue utilizing the Silverback name in an attempt to distance himself from financial obligations left by Michael Lause of MRL Entertainment. Corwyn folded the Silverback name and switched to the Dayton Sharks name and then fired the GM and attempted to strap her with the leftover Silverback debts.

== Logos and uniforms ==
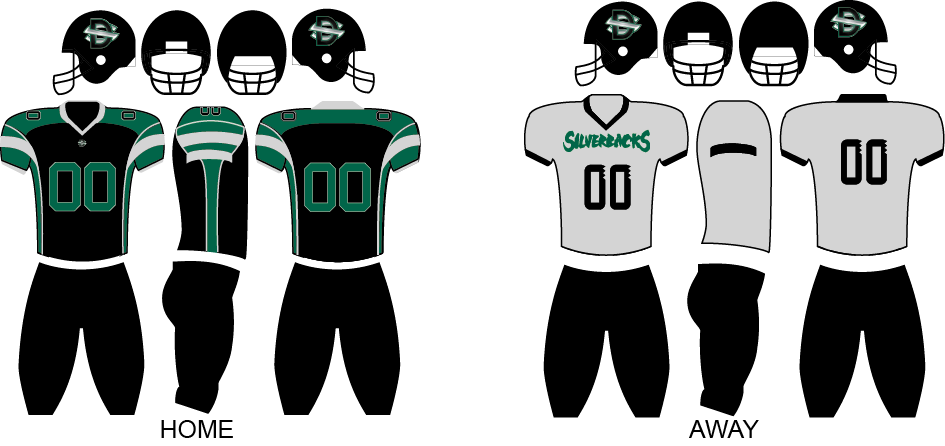
2011 Uniforms

The Silverbacks organization had the same primary logo from 2006 till 2010, featuring a Silverback, who was in brush, waiting to attack about the text, "Miami Valley Silverbacks." When the team mean moved to Dayton in 2011, they unveiled a new logo, again featuring a Silverback, roaring above the word "Silverbacks." The team's primary uniform colors are black, forest green and silver. The Silverbacks' helmet is black with the letter D going through the letter S. The team wore black pants and green and silver jerseys for the entire 2011 season.

== Awards and honors ==
The following is a list of all Miami Valley/Dayton Silverbacks players who have won Individual Awards and Honors.

Season	Player	Position	Award
2006	Joe Washington	C	AIFL All-Pro Team
2006	Maurice Lee	WR	AIFL All-Pro Team
2006	Bobby Britton	DB	AIFL All-Pro Team
2006	Neal Wood	LB	AIFL All-Pro Team
2008	George Murray	WR	2nd Team All-CIFL
2008	James Crawford	OL	2nd Team All-CIFL
2008	Brenton Brady	LB	2nd Team All-CIFL
2010	Richard Bailey	C	1st Team All-CIFL
2010	Chris Stanford	DB	1st Team All-CIFL
2010	Daniel Stover	WR	2nd Team All-CIFL
2010	Derrick Crawford	DT	2nd Team All-CIFL
2011	Chris Respress	DB	Defensive Player of the Year
2012	Melvin Thomas	DB	Defensive Player of the Year

== Head coaches ==
Note: Statistics are correct through the end of the 2012 CIFL season.

Name	Term	Regular season				Playoffs		Awards
Name	Term	W	L	T	Win%	W	L	Awards
Matt King	2006–2007	9	18	0	.333	0	1	
Carl Allen	2008	3	9	0	.250	0	0	
Brian Wells	2010	4	6	0	.400	0	1	Co-CIFL Coach of the Year
Derrick Shepard	2009, 2011	5	15	0	.250	0	1	
James Scott	2012	8	1	0	.889	0	1	CIFL Coach of the Year

== Season-by-season results ==
League champions	Conference champions	Division champions	Wild card berth	League leader

Season	Team	League	Conference	Division	Regular season				Postseason results
Season	Team	League	Conference	Division	Finish	Wins	Losses	Ties	Postseason results
Miami Valley Silverbacks
2006	2006	AIFL	Northern		6th	5	9	0	
2007	2007	CIFL	Great Lakes		6th	4	8	0	Lost Great Lakes Division Qualifier (Slaughter) 28–60
2008	2008	CIFL	Great Lakes	East	4th	3	9	0	
2009	2009	CIFL		East	4th	0	10	0	
2010	2010	CIFL			4th	4	6	0	Lost CIFL semifinals (Commandos) 24–46
Dayton Silverbacks
2011	2011	CIFL			3rd	5	5	0	Lost CIFL semifinals (Blue Racers) 18–53
2012	2012	CIFL			2nd	8	1	0	Lost CIFL Championship Game (Sting) 7-35
Totals						29	48	0	All-time regular season record (2006–2012)
Totals						0	4	-	All-time postseason record (2006–2012)
Totals						29	52	0	All-time regular season and postseason record (2006–2012)

== Media ==
- Broadcasters: Radio - Dave Reed, Micheal Hirn, Lee W. Mowen
- Local media: Radio - Ohio Sports Radio
