= 2009 Marion Mayhem season =

- Owner: Michael Birch; Stanley Jackson
- Head coach: Pepe Pearson
- Home stadium: Veterans Memorial Coliseum; 220 East Fairground Street; Marion, OH 43302

Results
- Record: 9–3
- Division place: 1st East
- Playoffs: Lost Eastern Division Championship 40-49 (Freedom)

The 2009 Marion Mayhem season was the fourth season for the Continental Indoor Football League (CIFL) franchise. The Mayhem finished the regular season with a 9-3 record in 2009. This was good enough to earn them the 2009 CIFL East Division Regular Season Title and the opportunity to host the East Division Championship Game. This was the third season in a row the Mayhem made the playoffs. Their opponent in the East Division Championship Game was the Fort Wayne Freedom (6-5). Coming into the game the Freedom had been experiencing money problems and up until three days before the East Division Championship Game the Freedom still were not sure they were going to show up in Marion. But when game time came the Freedom, whom brought a smaller than usual roster that had not practiced regularly for a couple of weeks, played with more heart and determination then the Mayhem and won 49-40.

== Schedule ==
Date	Opponent	Home/Away	Result
March 13	Wheeling Wildcats	Home	W 55-49
March 21	Fort Wayne Freedom	Away	L 23-46
March 27	Miami Valley Silverbacks	Home	W 55-0
April 4	Fort Wayne Freedom	Home	W 39-33 OT
April 11	Chicago Slaughter	Away	L 60-74
April 25	Wheeling Wildcats	Away	W 61-57
May 2	Miami Valley Silverbacks	Home	W 36-2
May 9	Wisconsin Wolfpack	Away	W 59-19
May 16	Wheeling Wildcats	Home	W 54-24
May 23	Fort Wayne Freedom	Away	W 62-47
June 6	Rock River Raptors	Home	L 40-43
June 13	Miami Valley Silverbacks	Home	W 53-20
	2009 CIFL PLAYOFFS		
June 20	Fort Wayne Freedom (East Finals)	Home	L 40-49

== 2009 standings ==
2009 Continental Indoor Football League
Team	Overall				Division			
Team	W	L	T	PCT	W	L	T	PCT
East Division
Marion Mayhem-y	9	3	0	.750	8	1	0	.889
Fort Wayne Freedom-x	6	5	0	.545	5	2	0	.294
Wheeling Wildcats	2	10	0	.167	2	5	0	.286
Miami Valley Silverbacks	0	10	0	.000	0	7	0	.000
West Division
Chicago Slaughter-y	12	0	0	1.000	8	0	0	1.000
Wisconsin Wolfpack-x	7	5	0	.583	4	4	0	.500
Rock River Raptors	7	5	0	.583	3	5	0	.167
Milwaukee Bonecrushers	3	8	0	.273	1	7	0	.167
