= Donovan Morgan (American football) =

American gridiron football player (born 1982)

No. 11, 1, 2
- Position: Wide receiver

Personal information
- Born: July 29, 1982 (age 44); New Orleans, Louisiana, U.S.
- Listed height: 6 ft 2 in (1.88 m)
- Listed weight: 195 lb (88 kg)

Career information
- High school: Sarah T. Reed (New Orleans)
- College: Louisiana-Lafayette
- NFL draft: 2003: undrafted

Career history
- New York Jets (2004)*; Tulsa Talons (2005); Houston Texans (2005); Kansas City Chiefs (2006)*; Chicago Rush (2007–2008); Buffalo Bills (2007)*; Chicago Slaughter (2009); Tulsa Talons (2010); Philadelphia Soul (2011–2012); Calgary Stampeders (2011)*; New Orleans VooDoo (2013); Los Angeles KISS (2014); Las Vegas Outlaws (2015)*; Los Angeles KISS (2015–2016); Columbus Destroyers (2019)
- * Offseason or practice squad member only

Awards and highlights
- 2× First-team All-Arena (2010, 2015); 3× Second-team All-Arena (2011, 2014, 2016); AFL Rookie of the Year (2008); AFL All-Rookie Team (2008); af2 Rookie of the Year (2005); af2 record for single-season points (346 points in 2005); af2 record for single-season touchdowns (57 touchdowns in 2005); af2 record for single-season receiving touchdowns (54 touchdowns in 2005); CIFL Championship Game MVP (2009)

Career NFL statistics
- Receptions: 4
- Receiving yards: 42
- Stats at Pro Football Reference

Career AFL statistics
- Receptions: 907
- Receiving yards: 12,732
- Receiving touchdowns: 290
- Rushing touchdowns: 6
- Total tackles: 37.5
- Stats at ArenaFan.com

Donovan Morgan (born July 29, 1982) is an American former professional arena football wide receiver.

After playing college football for the University of Louisiana at Lafayette, Morgan was signed as an undrafted free agent by the New York Jets, spending time in their training camp. He played two stints with the Tulsa Talons of the af2. While a member of the Talons in 2005, Morgan set af2 records for touchdown receptions (54), total touchdowns (57) and points scored in a season (346). He was signed by the Buffalo Bills on May 21, 2007, but released on August 27, 2007.

== Early life ==
Morgan attended Sarah T. Reed High School in New Orleans, Louisiana.

== Professional career ==
=== NFL ===
Morgan spent 2004 to 2006 in the National Football League with the New York Jets, Houston Texans and Kansas City Chiefs. In 2005 with the Texans, Morgan played in three games, catching four passes for 42 yards.

=== af2 ===
Morgan had two stints with the Tulsa Talons. In 2005, he played for Tulsa in the af2. He set af2 records with 346 points, 57 total touchdowns, and 54 receiving touchdowns. He was named the af2 Rookie of the Year.

=== Buffalo Bills ===
In 2007, Morgan signed with the Buffalo Bills and spent time with the team during training camp.

=== Arena Football League ===
In 2008, Morgan signed with the Chicago Rush, catching 111 passes for 1,281 yards and 24 touchdowns. He was named the AFL Rookie of the Year, becoming the first player to win Rookie of the Year honors twice, in the af2 and AFL. For the Rush, Morgan formed a three-headed receiver trio with Damian Harrell and Travis LaTendresse, and all three racked up 1,000 receiving yards in the season.

=== CIFL ===
When the AFL didn't play in 2009, Morgan joined the Chicago Slaughter of the Continental Indoor Football League. There, he Russ Michna and other former member of the Chicago Rush lead the Slaughter to a 2009 CIFL Championship Game victory. Morgan was named MVP of the championship game.

=== Return to the AFL ===
In 2010, Morgan rejoined the Tulsa Talons, and finished the year with 123 receptions and 1,707 yards. His 52 touchdowns led the Arena Football League.

For 2011, Morgan joined the Philadelphia Soul, rejoining quarterback Justin Allgood from Tulsa, and Chicago Rush teammate DeJuan Alfonzo and former Rush coach Mike Hohensee.

In 2012, he was traded to the New Orleans VooDoo at his request to be closer to his family.

On February 13, 2014, he was traded to the Los Angeles KISS for Chase Deadder.

On October 28, 2014, he was assigned to the Las Vegas Outlaws.

On March 10, 2015, Morgan and Lacoltan Bester were traded to the KISS for Derrick Ross.

He retired after the 2016 season.

On March 5, 2019, Morgan came out of retirement and was assigned to the Columbus Destroyers.

== Coaching career ==
Morgan was the offensive coordinator for the Iowa Rampage of the new Arena Football League in 2024.

== See also ==
- List of Arena Football League and National Football League players
