= Olberding =

Olberding is a German surname. Notable people with the surname include:

- Lance Olberding (born 1971), American gridiron football player
- Mark Olberding (born 1956), American basketball player
