= Tim McManigal =

American football player (born 1983)

Tim McManigal (born December, 1983 in Chicago, IL) is an American football linebacker playing for the Chicago Slaughter of the Indoor Football League. He was signed by the Winnipeg Blue Bombers of the CFL in 2007. He played college football at New Mexico State where he was second team ALL WAC.

== Early years ==
McManigal attended Marist High School in Chicago, IL where he lettered in football and basketball.
