= Lance Olberding =

American football player (born 1971)

Profile
- Position: Offensive tackle

Personal information
- Born: March 1, 1971 (age 55); Rochester, Minnesota, U.S.
- Listed height: 6 ft 7 in (2.01 m)
- Listed weight: 298 lb (135 kg)

Career information
- High school: Apple Valley (MN)
- College: Iowa; Kirkwood CC
- NFL draft: 1992: 7th round, 172nd overall pick

Career history
- Randolph Oilers (1991); Cincinnati Bengals (1992)*; Minnesota Vikings (1992)*; New England Patriots (1993)*; Dayton Warbirds (2005); Cincinnati Marshals (2006)
- * Offseason or practice squad member only

Lance Olberding (born March 1, 1971) is an American former football offensive lineman who was selected by the Cincinnati Bengals in the seventh round of the 1992 NFL draft. He is notable for being drafted despite never playing a snap in a college football game.

== Amateur career ==
Olberding was a member of the Iowa Hawkeyes traveling team as a freshman, but did not see any playing time. After the season, he transferred to Kirkwood Community College. In 1992, Olberding joined the Randolph Oilers of the Eastern Football League (EFL), an amateur football team in Randolph, Massachusetts. While with Randolph, he was coached by former National Football League (NFL) offensive lineman Jim Rourke.

== Professional career ==
Despite having very limited college football experience, NFL draft guru Mel Kiper Jr. ranked Olberding the eighth best offensive tackle in the 1992 NFL draft. At the 1992 NFL scouting combine, Olberding ran a 5.4 second 40-yard dash and bench pressed 22 reps.

=== Cincinnati Bengals ===
Olberding was selected by the Cincinnati Bengals with the 172nd overall pick in the 1992 NFL draft. He was the first player ever drafted from the Eastern Football League. First-year Bengals head coach Dave Shula had high praise for Olberding's work ethic, saying, "Lance [Olberding] has a good mix of athletic ability and size. We don't expect him to in and start right away, but we do expect him to come in and compete for a spot on the roster."

=== Minnesota Vikings ===
Olberding was a practice squad player for the Minnesota Vikings in 1992.

=== New England Patriots ===
In 1993, Olberding spent the preseason with the New England Patriots.

=== Dayton Warbirds ===
In 2005, Olberding would make a return to professional football by playing with the Dayton Warbirds of the National Indoor Football League.

=== Cincinnati Marshals ===
In 2006, he would return to the National Indoor Football League, this time playing for the Cincinnati Marshals.
