= Dayton Bulldogs =

General information
- Founded: 2006
- Folded: 2006
- Headquartered: Dayton, Ohio at the Nutter Center
- Colors: Blue, White

Personnel
- Owners: Bishop Keith Brooks, Denise Jackson
- Head coach: Derrick Davidson

Team history
- Dayton Bulldogs (2006)

Home fields
- Nutter Center (2006)

League / conference affiliations
- National Indoor Football League (2006)

The Dayton Bulldogs was an indoor football team in Dayton, Ohio. They were members of the National Indoor Football League that played during the 2006 season. They played their home games at the Nutter Center.

== History ==
The Dayton Bulldogs were founded in 2006 following the folding of the Dayton Warbirds. The Warbirds tried to enter the United Indoor Football league, but were expelled from that league due to financial issues. The franchise rejoined the NIFL under new owners Bishop Keith Brooks and Denise Jackson just before the start of the season. They hired head coach Derrick Davidson and his assistant Ramone Davenport.

In the middle of the season, the Nutter Center evicted the franchise due to unpaid bills. The team then announced that they had secured a small indoor soccer venue, but this was untrue and all remaining home games became forfeit losses. At about the same time, the team disintegrated, to be replaced by a road team. The real Bulldogs only played five or six games, only defeating Cincinnati and Tennessee. The other victory was a forfeit win over the Twin City Gators. On the positive side, the team was competitive in their early games against the rival Cincinnati Marshals. After losing 62–28, the Bulldogs came back the next weekend with a blowout 52–34 win of their own. The franchise would fold themselves after the season.
