= Rod Rutherford =

American football player and coach (born 1980)

No. 12
- Position: Quarterback

Personal information
- Born: December 12, 1980 (age 45); Pittsburgh, Pennsylvania, U.S.
- Listed height: 6 ft 2 in (1.88 m)
- Listed weight: 223 lb (101 kg)

Career information
- High school: Pittsburgh (PA) Perry Traditional Academy
- College: Pittsburgh
- NFL draft: 2004: undrafted

Career history

Playing
- Carolina Panthers (2004); Pittsburgh Steelers (2005–2006)*; Hamburg Sea Devils (2007); Erie RiverRats (2008); Wheeling Wildcats (2009); Erie Storm (2010); Western Pennsylvania Sting (2012)
- * Offseason or practice squad member only

Coaching
- Pittsburgh (2007) Quarterbacks coach; Saint Vincent College (2008) Defensive backs coach; Pittsburgh (2009) GA, Linebackers coach; Indiana (PA) (2011–2015) Wide receivers coach

Awards and highlights
- Super Bowl champion (XL)

Rod Rutherford (born December 12, 1980) is an American football coach and former quarterback. Rutherford spent time on both the Pittsburgh Steelers and the Carolina Panthers rosters, mostly as a practice squad player. Rutherford entered the National Football League (NFL) when he was signed by the Panthers as an undrafted free agent in 2004. He won a Super Bowl ring with the Steelers the following year in Super Bowl XL as a practice team player.

== Early life ==
Rutherford attended Perry Traditional Academy in Pittsburgh, Pennsylvania and was a letterman in football. Rutherford was named Pittsburgh Post-Gazette "Athlete of the Year" in both 1998 and 1999. He was heavily recruited by a number of NCAA Division I schools, including Pittsburgh, Penn State, Miami (FL), Michigan State, Indiana, and Syracuse.

== College career ==
At Pitt Rutherford led the Panthers to consecutive winning seasons as the starter in 2002 and 2003, winning All-Big East honors for both efforts. However, early in his career he contributed in many other ways. After redshirting during his freshman season Rutherford was still fourth on the depth chart at quarterback, but his athleticism and desire earned him playing time as a kick returner, receiver, and running a few option plays from behind center. After chipping in situationally during his first two seasons Rutherford finally became the starter during his junior year in 2002. The 2002 season culminated with a 38–13 win over Oregon State in the Insight Bowl and a #18 ranking in the final Coaches Poll. The following year Rutherford had an even better season. The expectations were high for the Panthers as they reached a #9 ranking early in the season, but inconsistencies, primarily on defense, prevented the Panthers from living up to the season's lofty expectations. Despite the Panthers' struggles Rutherford still led the team to a winning record and a Continental Tire Bowl appearance. That season Rutherford set the single-season record for most passing yards in a season at the Pitt with 3,679. Even with all of that success at quarterback the one play for which he will most likely be remembered by Pitt fans is a 66-yard touchdown reception he had during his freshman season in a victory against Penn St. He finished his collegiate career with 458 completions in 840 attempts, passing for 6,725 yards and 60 touchdowns.

=== Statistics ===
| Year | Team | Passing | | | | | | | | Rushing | | | |
| Year | Team | Cmp | Att | Pct | Yds | Y/A | TD | Int | Rtg | Att | Yds | Avg | TD |
|---|---|---|---|---|---|---|---|---|---|---|---|---|---|
| 2000 | Pittsburgh | 0 | 3 | 0.0 | 0 | 0.0 | 0 | 0 | 0.0 | 20 | 77 | 3.9 | 0 |
| 2001 | Pittsburgh | 19 | 59 | 32.2 | 262 | 4.4 | 1 | 4 | 61.5 | 81 | 255 | 3.1 | 6 |
| 2002 | Pittsburgh | 192 | 367 | 52.3 | 2,783 | 7.6 | 22 | 12 | 129.3 | 182 | 398 | 2.2 | 6 |
| 2003 | Pittsburgh | 247 | 413 | 59.8 | 3,679 | 8.9 | 37 | 14 | 157.4 | 136 | 150 | 1.1 | 2 |
| Career | | 458 | 842 | 54.4 | 6,724 | 8.0 | 60 | 30 | 137.9 | 419 | 880 | 2.1 | 14 |

== Professional career ==
Rutherford was rated the 12th quarterback in the 2004 NFL draft by NFLDraftScout.com.

Pre-draft measurables
| Height | Weight | 40-yard dash | 10-yard split | 20-yard split | 20-yard shuttle | Three-cone drill | Vertical jump | Broad jump | Wonderlic |
|---|---|---|---|---|---|---|---|---|---|
| 6 ft 2 in (1.88 m) | 240 lb (109 kg) | 4.77 s | 1.72 s | 2.80 s | 4.41 s | 7.66 s | 30 1/2 in (0.77 m) | 9 ft 2 in (2.79 m) | 17 |
All values from NFL Combine

Rutherford was undrafted upon entering the NFL, but was signed to the Carolina Panthers, where he spent the 2004 season on the practice squad. The following year saw Rutherford return to his hometown of Pittsburgh where he spent another season on a practice squad, this time with the Pittsburgh Steelers. While with the Steelers he earned a Super Bowl ring as the Steelers won Super Bowl XL.

Without an offer to remain in the NFL, Rutherford spent 2007 in NFL Europa with the Hamburg Sea Devils. In 2008, he signed to play for the Erie RiverRats of the American Indoor Football Association where he selected to the all-AIFA squad after leading Erie to a 7–2 record in his nine regular-season starts, after he began the season playing for the Wilkes Barre/Scranton Pioneers of AF2. In 2010, he signed once again with Erie (now known as the Explosion, formerly the Storm and RiverRats) for his second tour of duty. In 2012, he signed with Western Pennsylvania of the UIFL.

== Coaching ==
After his 2007 season with Hamburg ended, Rutherford spent the remainder of the year as a volunteer quarterbacks coach under head coach Dave Wannstedt at his alma mater. Then, upon the conclusion of his 2008 season playing in the AIFA, Rutherford was hired as defensive backs coach at Saint Vincent College. Rutherford returned to the University of Pittsburgh as a defensive assistant coach in 2009.

In 2011, Rutherford was hired by Curt Cignetti to coach wide receivers for the Indiana University of Pennsylvania, a position he held for five seasons through 2015. He is now the quarterbacks coach at Lake Nona High School.
