= Ray Jackson (American football) =

American football player (born 1978)

No. 33
- Position: Running back

Personal information
- Born: August 1, 1978 (age 48); Indianapolis, Indiana, U.S.
- Listed height: 6 ft 1 in (1.85 m)
- Listed weight: 223 lb (101 kg)

Career information
- High school: Lawrence Central (Indianapolis)
- College: Cincinnati
- NFL draft: 2002: undrafted

Career history
- Cincinnati Bengals (2003)*; Tennessee Titans (2003–2004); Berlin Thunder (2004); Cincinnati Marshals (2006); Cincinnati Commandos (2010)
- * Offseason or practice squad member only

Career NFL statistics
- Return yards: 77
- Return touchdowns: 0
- Stats at Pro Football Reference

Raymond F. Jackson (born August 1, 1978) is an American former professional football player who was a running back for the Tennessee Titans of the National Football League (NFL). He played college football for the Michigan Wolverines and Cincinnati Bearcats.

== Pro football career ==
After not being selected in the 2002 NFL draft, Jackson was a summer camp counselor for the Cincinnati city recreation department and later worked at a Wal-Mart.

On March 13, 2003, Jackson signed a two-year contract with the Cincinnati Bengals and participated in training camp with the Bengals. Jackson signed as a free agent with the Tennessee Titans on November 18, 2003. In what would be his only career NFL game, Jackson had three kick returns for 77 yards in the Titans' 2003 regular season finale, a 33–13 win over Tampa Bay.

In 2004, Jackson played six games for the Berlin Thunder of NFL Europe, during which he had 63 carries for 236 yards and a touchdown.
