= Veterans Memorial Fieldhouse =

Defunct sports venue in Huntington, West Virginia

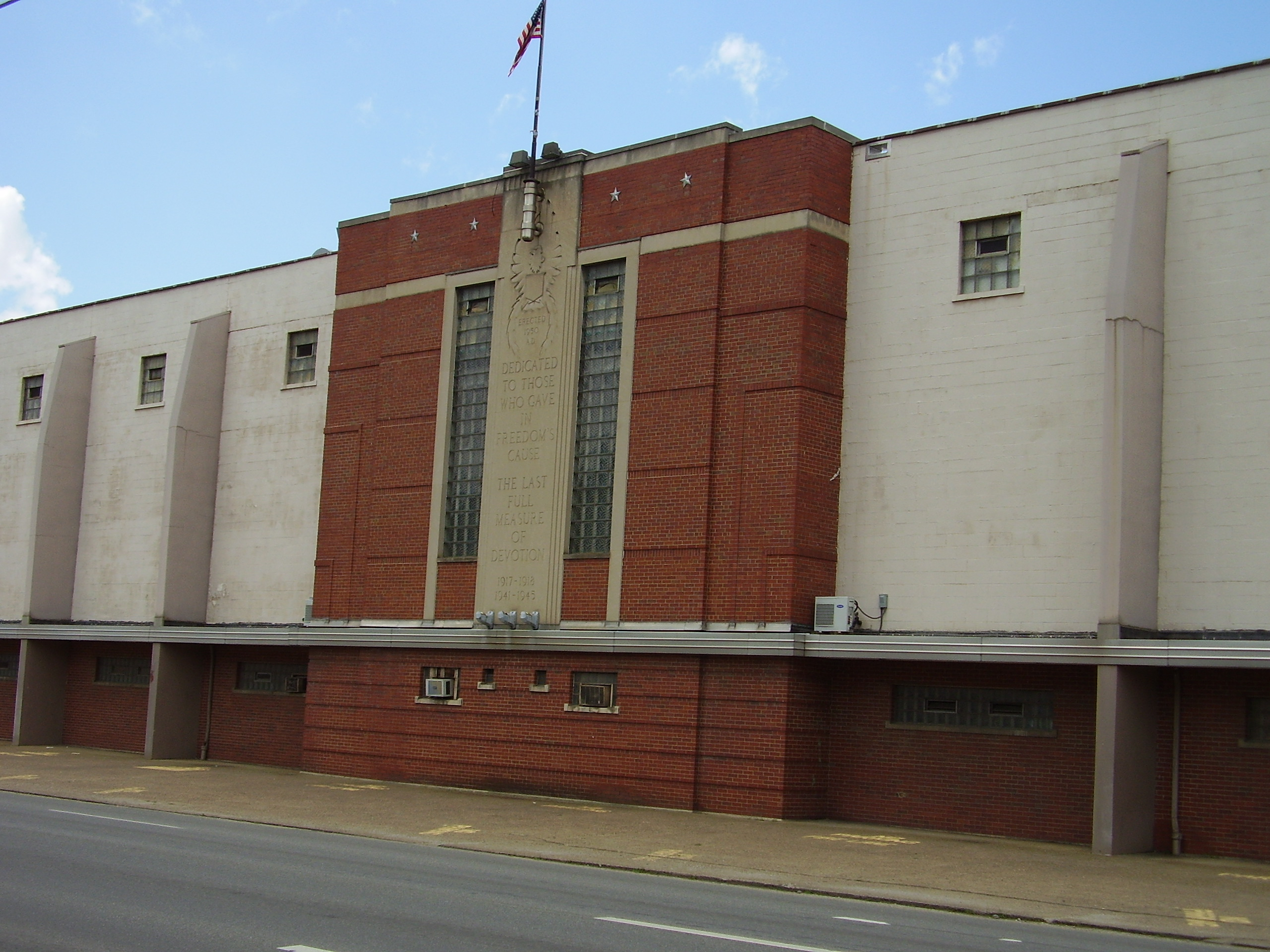
- Interactive map of Veterans Memorial Fieldhouse
- Location: 2590 5th Avenue; Huntington, West Virginia 25703
- Coordinates: 38°25′31″N 82°24′33″W
- Owner: Greater Huntington Park and Recreation District (transferred to Marshall University for the purpose of demolition and property redevelopment)
- Operator: Greater Huntington Park and Recreation District
- Capacity: 8,500 (6,500 for basketball)

Construction
- Opened: October 1950
- Closed: February 10, 2012
- Demolished: May–July 2012

Tenants
- St. Joseph Catholic High School basketball Marshall Thundering Herd basketball (NCAA) (1950–81); Huntington High School^{†} basketball (1950–90); Huntington East High School^{†} basketball (1950–90) Huntington Hornets (IHL) (1956–57); Huntington Heroes (AIFL) (2006); Huntington High School^{†} basketball (2006–07); West Virginia Wild (CIFL) (was to begin in 2009)^{†} Huntington East High School and the original Huntington High School were consolidated into the current Huntington High School in 1996.

The Veterans Memorial Fieldhouse was an 8,500-seat (6,500 for basketball) multi-purpose arena in Huntington, West Virginia. It was built in 1950. Prior to the completion of the Huntington Civic Center (now known as Marshall Health Network Arena) in 1976, it was the only large arena in the city. It closed on February 10, 2012, and was demolished later that year.

== History ==
In the aftermath of the November 14, 1970 Marshall University air tragedy, which claimed the lives of 75 Marshall University football team members, coaches, support staff, boosters and Southern Airways flight crew, the Fieldhouse was the site of a community memorial service on Sunday evening, November 15, 1970 that attracted an estimated 7,000 mourners to the arena.

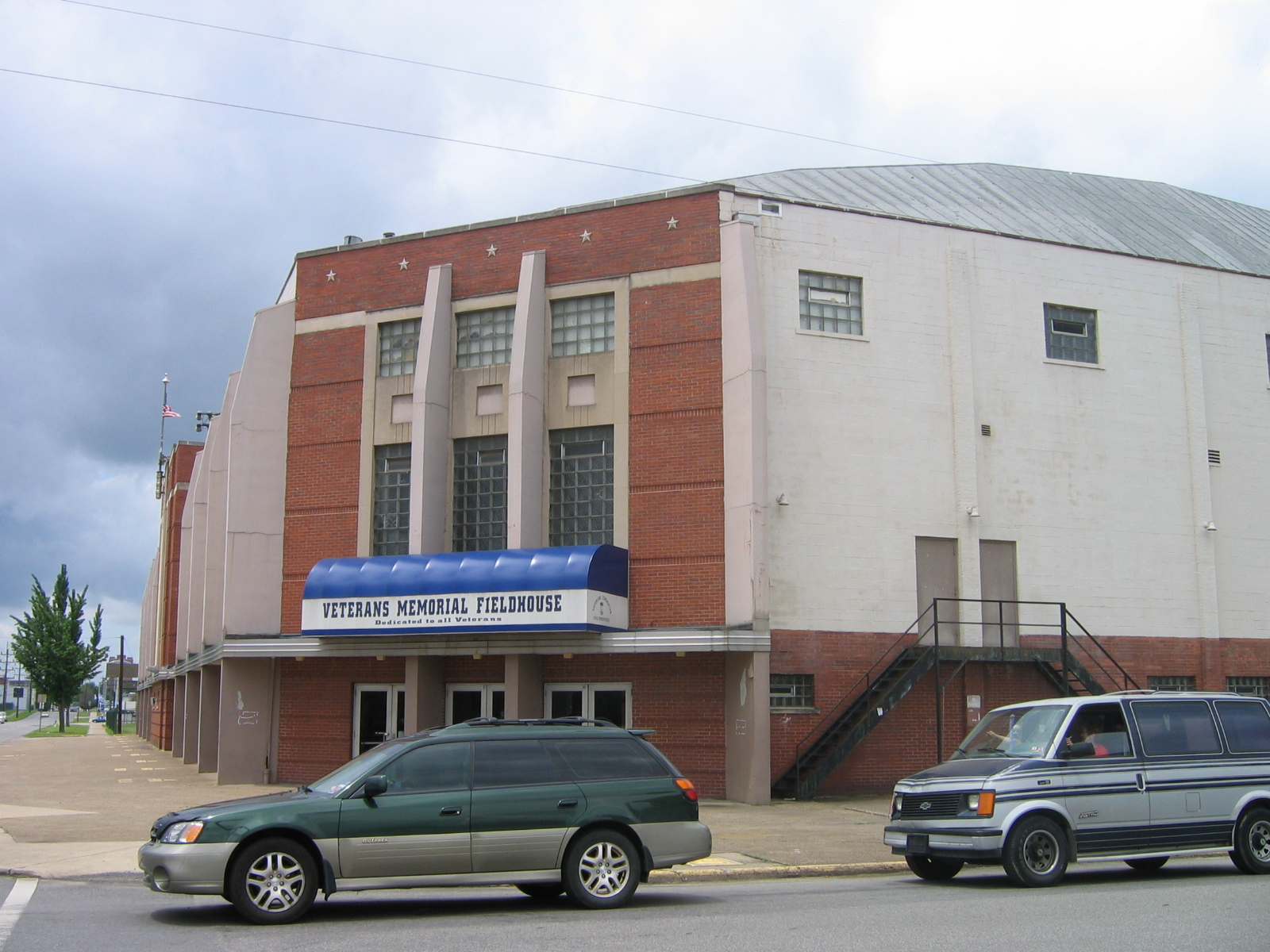
Main Corner Entrance 2008

With the completion of the two more modern facilities, the Fieldhouse was used primarily for smaller concert events. Also, the facility was built in an era when boxing was more popular and thus was designed around that sport and remained an excellent venue for boxing and professional wrestling.

After Marshall moved out, the Fieldhouse started to fall into a state of disrepair. As of 2011, the aging structure was in need of significant roof repairs and interior renovations and had become a financial burden for its owner/operator, the Greater Huntington Park and Recreation District, which operated the arena at a financial loss.

In April, 2011, the District Board voted unanimously to transfer the Veterans Memorial Fieldhouse property to Marshall University, which redeveloped the site as part of a $30 million athletic facilities project approved by the Marshall University Board of Governors. The only condition of the transfer was that the area be known as the "Veterans Memorial" area.

Marshall University spent $5.4 million on the Veterans Memorial Fieldhouse phase of the facilities project, which included demolition of the 61-year-old venue and construction of Veterans Memorial Soccer Complex and veteran's memorial park on the site. To allow for the project, the university agreed to allow St. Joseph Catholic High School to move their home games to the Henderson Center, but then an NCAA ruling prohibiting regular season games in college owned venues was passed.

A grand finale event for the 62-year-old venue - a Marshall University alumni basketball game and a veterans recognition ceremony - was held on February 10, 2012. The last shot ever in the building was made by Marshall great Russell Lee, and the crowd was addressed by the state's only living Medal of Honor recipient, Hershel W. Williams. Seating, signage and memorabilia were available for sale to the public through a silent auction of Fieldhouse memorabilia at and after the event. The most recent basketball floor (itself bought second hand from Marshall University when the current Henderson Center floor was installed and still bearing the markings from Marshall's Mid-American Conference era) was bought by the then-Big Sandy Superstore Arena. Ownership of the arena was transferred to Marshall University at the end of February, 2012. Demolition was completed by mid July 2012.

== Tenants ==
The Fieldhouse was the home of the Marshall University basketball teams until the completion of the Cam Henderson Center in 1981. It also hosted the West Virginia public high school championships on a rotating basis with Charleston and Morgantown between 1962 and 1970, and the state Catholic championships every year from 1950 until the public and Catholic leagues were merged in 1979. Following the demise of the Catholic League, the local St. Joseph Catholic High School hosted the "St. Joe Invitational" which continued the tradition of skits and plays from that league.

The arena was home to the International Hockey League's short-lived Huntington Hornets for the league's 1956–57 season. The team completed the season with a 26–30–4 record. The Hornets suffered from low attendance, prompting owner Ernie Berg to begin seeking a new home for the team as early as December, 1956. Local promoter Dick Deutsch attempted to save the team twice through local investments. Ultimately, the attempts fell short, and the team was slated for suspension of operations or relocation. The IHL eventually approved relocation of the franchise to Louisville, Kentucky, where the team was rebranded as the Rebels.

It was the home of all high schools in the city until 1990 and was the home of St. Joseph High until 2011. It was the home of the Huntington Heroes American Indoor Football League team in 2005-06 before they moved to Big Sandy Superstore Arena. In addition, the venue also hosted several high school athletic events, including wrestling and basketball matches.
