= Ron Carpenter (defensive back) =

American football player and coach (born 1970)

No. 32, 36, 26, 24, 31, 21, 2, 23
- Position: Defensive back

Personal information
- Born: January 20, 1970 (age 56); Cincinnati, Ohio, U.S.
- Listed height: 6 ft 1 in (1.85 m)
- Listed weight: 189 lb (86 kg)

Career information
- High school: Princeton (Sharonville, Ohio)
- College: Miami (OH)
- NFL draft: 1993: undrafted

Career history

Playing
- Minnesota Vikings (1993); Cincinnati Bengals (1993); Minnesota Vikings (1994)*; Amsterdam Admirals (1995); New York Jets (1995–1996); Amsterdam Admirals (1997); New York CityHawks (1998); St. Louis Rams (1998–1999); Nashville Kats (2000); Los Angeles Xtreme (2001); Nashville Kats (2001); Georgia Force (2002); Detroit Fury (2003–2004); Cincinnati Marshals (2005)
- * Offseason or practice squad member only

Coaching
- Princeton (OH) HS (2000–2007) Assistant; Central State (2009–2010) Assistant; Indiana (2011) Defense and special teams quality control; Miami (OH) (2012–2013) Defensive backs coach; Central Arkansas (2014–2015) Assistant

Awards and highlights
- Super Bowl champion (XXXIV); XFL champion (2001)

Career NFL statistics
- Tackles: 39
- Forced fumbles: 1
- Passes defended: 1
- Stats at Pro Football Reference

Career AFL statistics
- Tackles: 285
- Interceptions: 19
- Passes defended: 68
- Stats at ArenaFan.com

Ronald Allen Carpenter Jr. (born January 20, 1970) is an American former professional football player who was a defensive back for five seasons in the National Football League (NFL) with the Cincinnati Bengals, Minnesota Vikings. New York Jets, and St. Louis Rams. He played college football for the Miami RedHawks in Oxford, Ohio, where he was a three-time first-team All-Mid-American Conference player and served as captain his senior season. He was voted to the Miami University All-Millennium team by The Cincinnati Enquirer in 2000. He was also inducted into the Miami University Athletic Hall of Fame on October 14, 2016. Carpenter was also an All-World League player for the Amsterdam Admirals and spent seasons with the New York CityHawks of the Arena Football League (AFL), the Los Angeles Xtreme of the XFL, and the Nashville Kats, Georgia Force, and Detroit Fury of the AFL. He finished his professional playing career with the Cincinnati Marshals of the National Indoor Football League. He owns a Super Bowl ring from the 1999 Rams and an XFL Championship ring from the 2001 Xtreme. Following his professional career, Carpenter took up coaching and scouting, having scouted for Pro Football Scouts Inc., the Tennessee Titans as a scouting intern, and coached for Princeton High School in Ohio, the Georgia Force, Central State University, Indiana University, Miami University and the University of Central Arkansas.
