= Hubbard Alexander =

American football player and coach (1939–2016)

Profile
- Position: Center

Personal information
- Born: February 14, 1939; Winston-Salem, North Carolina, U.S.
- Died: August 28, 2016 (aged 77); Reisterstown, Maryland, U.S.

Career information
- High school: Atkins (Winston-Salem)
- College: Tennessee State
- NFL draft: 1962: undrafted

Career history
- Tennessee State (1962–1963) Graduate assistant; George Washington HS (IL) (1963–1965); Lester HS (1966–1970); East HS (TN) (1971–1974); Vanderbilt (1975–1978) Defensive line & tight ends coach; Miami (FL) (1979–1984) Tight ends coach; Miami (FL) (1985–1988) Wide receivers coach; Dallas Cowboys (1989–1997) Wide receivers coach; Minnesota Vikings (1998–1999) Wide receivers coach; New Orleans Saints (2000–2003) Wide receivers coach; Cincinnati Marshals (2005) Assistant coach; Melrose High School (TN) Head coach

Awards and highlights
- 3× Super Bowl champion (XXVII, XXVIII, XXX); 2× National champion (1983, 1987)

Hubbard Lindsay "Axe" Alexander (February 14, 1939 – August 28, 2016) was an American college and professional football coach. As an assistant coach, he won three Super Bowls with the Dallas Cowboys of the National Football League (NFL) and two national championships at the University of Miami. He played college football at Tennessee State University.

== Early life ==
Alexander played high school football, basketball and baseball at Atkins High School in Winston-Salem, North Carolina. He earned four varsity letters in football, three in basketball and four in baseball. He was captain of the 1958 football and basketball teams his senior year while earning All-City/County and All-State honors in football. Alexander led the basketball team to the N.C.H.S.A.A. State Championship during the 1956–57 season.

== College career ==
Alexander played center for the Tennessee State Tigers. He lettered his freshman year, and started the next three years. He garnered All-Midwestern Conference accolades his junior and senior years. Alexander earned All-American honors his senior year. He was also a team captain three years in a row. He graduated with a degree in Health and Physical Education in 1962.

== Coaching career ==
Alexander was a graduate assistant for the Tennessee State Tigers from 1962 to 1963. He coached at George Washington High School in Chicago, Illinois from 1963 to 1965. He coached at Lester High School in Memphis, Tennessee from 1966 to 1970. Alexander was the head coach and athletic director at East High School in Memphis from 1971 to 1974. He served as defensive line and tight ends coach for the Vanderbilt Commodores from 1975 to 1978. He was the tight ends coach of the Miami Hurricanes from 1979 to 1984 and the wide receivers coach from 1985 to 1988. The Hurricanes won the national championship in 1983 and 1987. Alexander served as wide receivers coach of the Dallas Cowboys of the NFL from 1989 to 1997, winning Super Bowl XXVII, XXVIII and XXX. He was the wide receivers coach of the NFL's Minnesota Vikings from 1998 to 1999. He served as wide receivers coach of the New Orleans Saints of the NFL from 2000 to 2003. Alexander was an assistant coach for the Cincinnati Marshals of the National Indoor Football League in 2005. He has spent time as head coach at Melrose High School in Memphis.

== Personal life ==
Alexander married his college sweetheart, Gloria Demire, in 1962. They had three sons, Todd, Chad, and Bard. Chad played college football for the Wake Forest Demon Deacons and is the assistant general manager of the Los Angeles Chargers.

Hubbard died in Reisterstown Maryland on August 28, 2016.
