= Nutter Center =

Multi-purpose arena at Wright State University in Fairborn, Ohio, U.S.

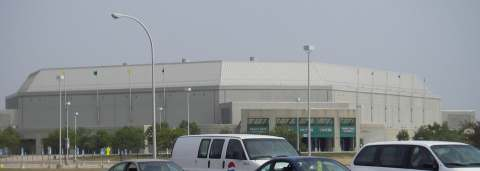
- Interactive map of Nutter Center
- Full name: Wright State University Nutter Center
- Former names: Ervin J. Nutter Center (1990–2011)
- Address: 3640 Colonel Glenn Hwy
- Location: Fairborn, Ohio, U.S.
- Coordinates: 39°46′55″N 84°3′9″W
- Owner: Wright State University
- Capacity: 10,400 Configurations: Concerts: 11,200; Half house: up to 7,500; Basketball: 9,500
- Surface: Hardwood/Ice
- Field size: Ice surface: 200 x 85 ft (61 x 26 m)

Construction
- Groundbreaking: 1988
- Opened: December 1, 1990
- Cost: US$34.5 million ($93.9 million in 2025 dollars)
- Architect: HOK Sport
- Structural engineer: KZF Design

Tenants
- Wright State Raiders (NCAA); Men's basketball 1990–present Women's basketball 1990–present Dayton Wings (WBL) 1991–1992; Dayton Bombers (ECHL) 1996–2009; Dayton Warbirds (NIFL) 2005; Dayton Bulldogs (NIFL) 2006

Website
- nuttercenter.com

The Nutter Center is a multi-purpose arena located at Wright State University, in Fairborn, Ohio. It mainly serves as the home court of the Wright State Raiders men's and women's basketball teams. It is also regularly used as a music venue for touring concerts and shows and for area high school graduation ceremonies.

== History ==
A local businessman and inventor, Ervin J. Nutter, donated $1.5 million to Wright State University in 1986. Funds from both the state of Ohio and the university contributed an additional $8 million to construction efforts which began in 1988. Work was completed twenty months later and on December 1, 1990, the Nutter Center held its first official event.

== Events ==
=== Sports ===
- The first ever WWE King of the Ring event in 1993
- 2002 Kelly Cup Finals (games 3 and 4)
- 1993, 1995, 1996, 1997, 2001 & 2007 Midwestern Collegiate Conference (now Horizon League) men's basketball tournament.
- 2014 Horizon League championship game
- The Harlem Globetrotters have performed at the Nutter Center every New Year's Eve since at least 2005.

=== Other ===
Gloria Estefan played the Nutter Center on her comeback “Into The Light World Tour” on August 19, 1991.

Dire Straits played on their final tour, the ‘On Every Street’ tour. They played the Nutter Center on February 21, 1992.

- The band Phish played a concert at the venue on December 7, 1997, which was released in its entirety on their 2008 live album Live Phish 12.07.97. Phish also played at the venue in 1995, 2017, & 2023.
- Barack Obama's "Keeping America’s Promise" rally, on Monday, February 25, 2008.
- “Road to the Convention Rally” on August 29, 2008, at which time Sarah Palin, Governor of Alaska, was announced as presumptive Republican presidential candidate John McCain's vice-presidential candidate, or running mate.
- On May 17–18, 2013, the Nutter Center hosted the opening and closing ceremonies of the 2013 Science Olympiad National Tournament.
- July 22, 2015, the band Eagles performed one of their last stops on their History of the Eagles Tour.
- The Nutter Center was originally scheduled to host the first 2016 presidential debate but the venue was changed due to security and financial concerns.
- The Nutter Center is frequently used as a competition venue for the Winter Guard International indoor percussion, color guard, and winds championship.
- On May 19–20, 2017, the Nutter Center hosted the opening and closing ceremonies of the 2017 Science Olympiad National Tournament.
- On November 16, 2022, touring giant Dave Matthews Band played the arena.
- The Ohio High School Athletic Association hosts their State Volleyball Championships at the Nutter Center.

== See also ==
- E.J. Nutter Training Facility - a college football training facility at the University of Kentucky also named after Ervin J. Nutter
- List of NCAA Division I basketball arenas
