= Big 33 Football Classic =

High school football game

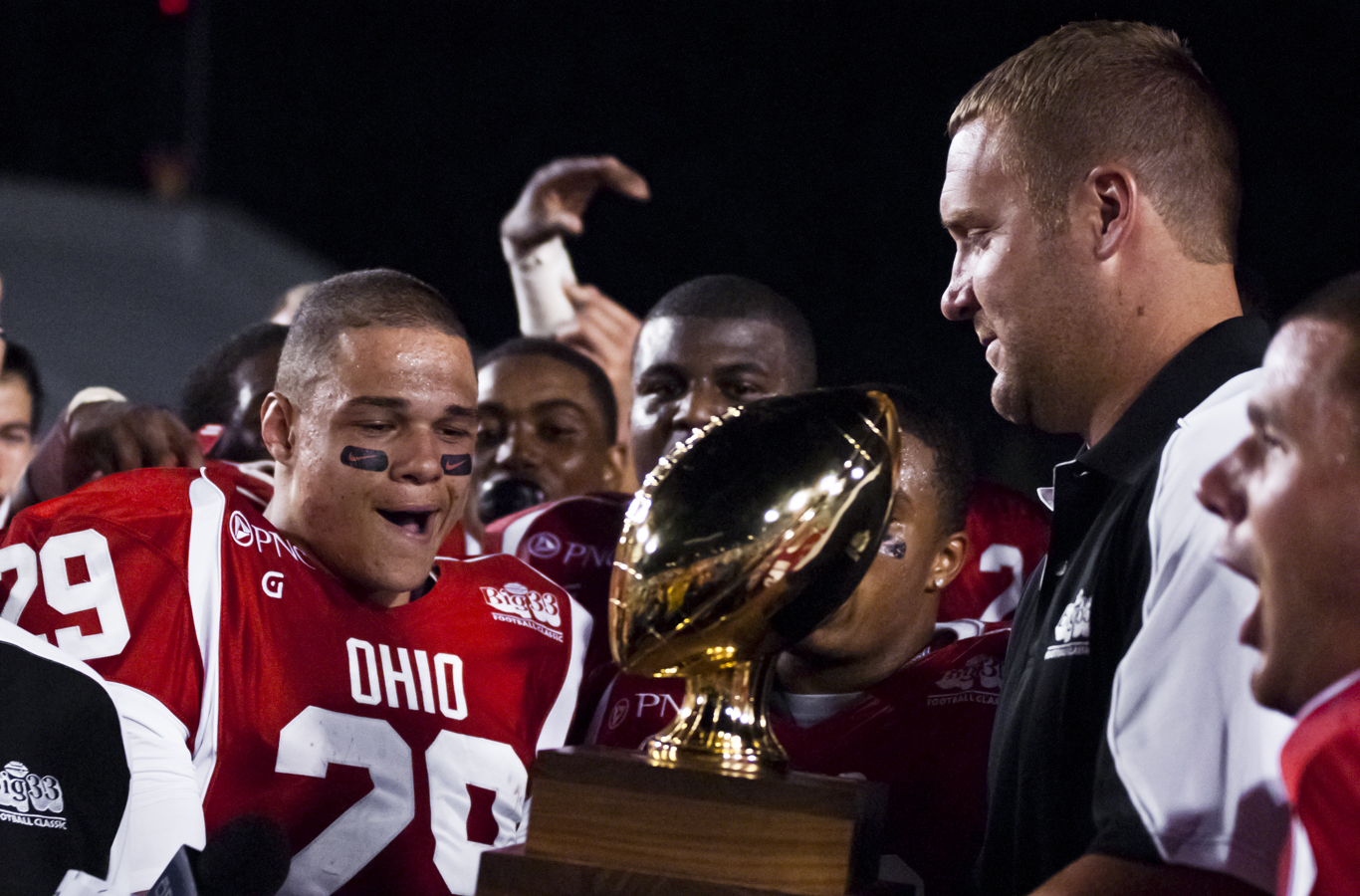
Ben Roethlisberger presents the Big 33 trophy to Ohio, the winning team, in 2012

The Big 33 Football Classic is an all-star American football game featuring the top high-school football players in Pennsylvania. Played since 1958, the game is often described as the "Super Bowl of High School Football."

== History ==
Contests currently pit players from Pennsylvania against players from Maryland, but opponents in the past have also included players from Ohio and Texas. While most earlier games were held at Hersheypark Stadium in Hershey, Pennsylvania, the game is now played at Cumberland Valley High School in Mechanicsburg.

No Super Bowl has ever been contested without a Big 33 alumnus.

=== Roster makeup ===
While the game was originally played with the best 33 players in each state (hence its name), the organizers added a 34th player to give kickers a chance to be separate of the 33 count as to give one more non-kicker a chance to be named to the Big 33. Thus, there are 34 players from each state who are invited to play in this game on the original roster. If there are players that are selected are unable to play, the staff of the team and the Big 33 will select other players to fill their places on the roster.

=== Historical notes ===
In 2006, the game was moved from mid-to-late July to mid-to-late June due to the NCAA rule changes that made some coaches prohibit many players from these teams from playing in the game due to the closeness of the upcoming summer practices.

In October 2012, it was announced that Pennsylvania had dropped Ohio from the Big 33 game and replaced them with Maryland.

Big 33 matchups by year
Home	Visitor	Years
Pennsylvania	Maryland	1985–92, 2013–present
Pennsylvania	Ohio	1972–76, 1993–2012
Pennsylvania	Texas	1964–67
Pennsylvania Blue	Pennsylvania Gray	1963
East Pennsylvania	West Pennsylvania	1961–62, 1968–71, 1977–84
Pennsylvania	Nation	1957–60

== Game-related activities ==
A wide variety of activities take place on the weekend of the game, typically in June or July. These activities include cheerleading exhibitions, scholarship presentations, youth clinics, and visits by the players to local hospitals, the Boys & Girls Club and other charities. Over $2 million in academic scholarships have been awarded as a result of the game and its sponsors. Each team has its own host families who host a player. The Ohio players arrive in Hershey and meet their host families Friday night (one week and a day before the game) and the Pennsylvania players arrive in Hershey and meet their host families on Saturday at the kickoff picnic that includes the host families and cheerleaders. The players visit hospitals and receive a "Buddy". Many of the players keep ties with their host families while in college and throughout their careers and the event is a very family-like event.

== Notable alumni ==
Year	Name	Position	Notes
1957	Herb Adderley	CB	3× Super Bowl Champion (I, II, VI) Pro Football Hall of Fame (1980)
1961	Joe Namath	QB	Super Bowl champion (III) Pro Football Hall of Fame inductee (1985)
1973	Tony Dorsett	RB	Super Bowl Champion XII Pro Football Hall of Fame Inductee (1994)
1974	Joe Montana	QB	4× Super Bowl champion (XVI, XIX, XXIII, XXIV) Pro Football Hall of Fame Inductee (2000)
1978	Jim Kelly	QB	Pro Football Hall of Fame Inductee (2002)
	Dan Marino	QB	1984 NFL MVP (AP, PFWA, NEA, SN, MX) Pro Football Hall of Fame inductee (2005)
1987	Ricky Watters	RB	Super Bowl champion (XXIX)
	Kerry Collins	QB	2× Pro Bowl (1996, 2008)
	Marvin Harrison	WR	Super Bowl champion (XLI) 3× First-team All-Pro (1999, 2002, 2006) 5× Second-team All-Pro (2000, 2001, 2003, 2004, 2005)
	Curtis Martin	RB	Pro Football Hall of Fame (2012)
1993	Jim Fitzgerald	RB/FB	
	Ty Law	CB	3× Super Bowl champion (XXXVI, XXXVIII, XXXIX) 2× All-Pro (1998, 2003)
	Orlando Pace	OT	Super Bowl champion (XXXIV) 5× All-Pro (1999, 2000, 2001, 2003, 2004)
1995	Darnell Dinkins	TE	Super Bowl Champion (XLIV)
1997	LaVar Arrington	LB	3× Pro Bowl (2001, 2002, 2003) 3× All-Pro (2001, 2002, 2003)
	Kyle Brady	TE	
	Zach Strief	OT	Super Bowl Champion (XLIV)
	Bob Sanders	SS	Super Bowl champion (XLI) AP NFL Defensive Player of the Year (2007) 2× First-team All-Pro (2005, 2007)
	Brett Veach	WR	Kansas City Chiefs Scout
1999	Robb Butler	DB	
2000	Ben Roethlisberger	QB	2× Super Bowl Champion (XL, XLIII) NFL Offensive Rookie of the Year (AP, Diet Pepsi, PFWA, SN) (2004)
	Marlin Jackson	CB/S	Super Bowl champion (XLI)
	Anthony Gonzalez	WR	
2004	Javon Ringer	RB	
	Brian Hoyer	QB	
	Ted Ginn Jr.	WR	
	Darrelle Revis	DB	
	Haruki Nakamura	WR	
2005	Alex Boone	G	
2005	Brian Hartline	WR	
2005	Mario Manningham	WR	Super Bowl Champion (XLVI)
2005	Zoltán Meskó	K	
2005	Brian Robiskie	WR	
2005	Austin Spitler	LB	
2005	Tyrell Sutton	RB	
2005	Matt Tennant	C	
	Jon Baldwin	WR	
	Jason Pinkston	G	
2009	Fitzgerald Toussaint	RB	
2009	Micah Hyde	RB	
2010	Greg Mancz	LT	
2011	Joel Heath	DE	
2012	Tyrique Jarrett	DL	
2022	Abdul Carter	DE	

== See also ==
- Gatorade Player of the Year awards
- USA Today All-USA high school football team
