= West Virginia Wild =

Indoor American Football Team

Logo

General information
- Founded: 2009
- Folded: 2009
- Headquartered: Veterans Memorial Fieldhouse in Huntington, West Virginia
- Colors: Orange, black, white

Personnel
- Owners: West Virginia Wild, LLC
- General manager: Rick Bryant, David Egnor
- Head coach: Michael Owens
- President: Dan Hicks

Team history
- West Virginia Wild (2009)

Home fields
- Veterans Memorial Fieldhouse (2009)

League / conference affiliations
- Continental Indoor Football League (2009)

The West Virginia Wild were a proposed professional indoor football team based in Huntington, West Virginia. The team was slated to become a member of the Continental Indoor Football League as an expansion team in 2009. The Wild were the third attempt at indoor football in Huntington, the second being the American Indoor Football League member, the Huntington Heroes from 2006 to 2008, and the first being the River Cities LocoMotives of the National Indoor Football League in 2001. They were suspended from the CIFL indefinitely for failing to turn in key items before the deadline. The owner of the Wild was Dan Hicks. The team was to play its home games at the Veterans Memorial Fieldhouse.

== Franchise history ==
On January 16, 2009, the Wild were announced as an expansion team for the 2009 Continental Indoor Football League season by interim-general manager, Chad Jarrett. During the press release, the team announced that they would be playing a 12-game schedule and would be playing their home games at Veterans Memorial Fieldhouse. Later that same day, the Wild announced that, former Marshall University standout, Michael Owens would be the team's coach. The team offered assurance that they were going to not go through the same struggles that past teams in the area had, but that was not the case as the team was suspended from the CIFL on February 20, 2009 for failing to present proof of liability insurance and workers compensation, not having a payment of the arena's mandatory deposit and finalizing the lease, not securing a field system and equipment and not making a payment of an outstanding balance to the league.
