= Perry Traditional Academy =

Coordinates: 40.48889°N 80.01889°W

Perry Traditional Academy / Perry High School
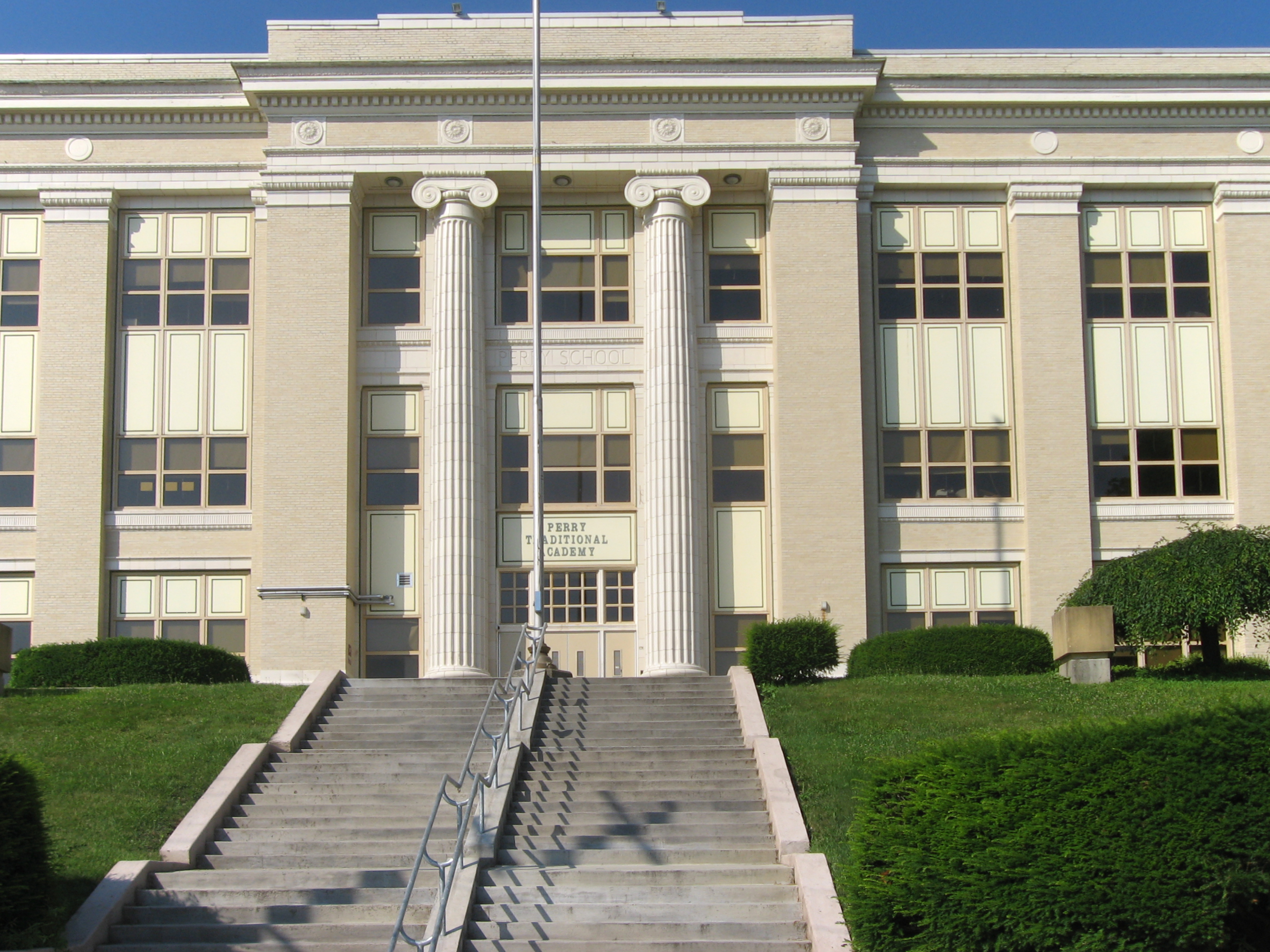
- 3875 Perrysville Avenue; Pittsburgh, PA 15214; United States

Information
- Type: Public
- Motto: "Knowledge for Service"
- Established: 1923
- School district: Pittsburgh Public Schools
- Principal: Dr. Robert E. Frioni
- Staff: 66 total; 36 teachers, 2 administration, 5 student service/counselors, 5 security, 5 aides, 2 reading/math coaches, 11 other
- Grades: 9–12
- Mascot: Commodore
- Representative: Gene Walker, District 9
- Website: Perry Traditional Academy

Pittsburgh Historic Designation
- Type: Structure
- Designated: November 30, 1999

Pittsburgh Landmark – PHLF
- Designated: 2001

U.S. National Register of Historic Places
- Designated: September 30, 1986

Perry Traditional Academy, also known as Perry High School, is a high school in the Perry North neighborhood of Pittsburgh, Pennsylvania. Perry is one of ten secondary schools in the Pittsburgh Public Schools.

== History ==
The school was originally part of the Allegheny City schools and was called the North End School or 10th Ward School No. 4. It opened in 1892 and was enlarged after a violent storm damaged the building in 1899. It was later renamed 15th Ward School No. 1 after being split off from the 10th Ward and was brought into Pittsburgh Public Schools along with the other Allegheny City schools in 1911. In 1913, the district decided to rename all of the numbered schools and 15th Ward No. 1 became the Perry School.

The current main building opened in 1922. Originally remaining as an elementary school, it was converted to a junior high school in 1923, with high school grades added in 1924.

== Feeder district ==
Perry Traditional Academy serves all of the following neighborhoods, which constitute the Northside of Pittsburgh: Allegheny Center, Allegheny West, Brighton Heights, California-Kirkbride, Central Northside, Chateau, East Allegheny, Fineview, Manchester, Marshall-Shadeland (Brightwood), North Shore (Lower Northside), Northview Heights, Perry Hilltop, Perry North (Observatory Hill), Perry South, Spring Hill-City View, Spring Garden, Summer Hill and Troy Hill.

== Enrollment ==
As of October 1, 2021:

Group	Number of students	Percent
All	335	100%
White	46	13.7%
African American	260	77.6%
Asian	<5	<1%
Hispanic	<5	<1%
Multiracial	24	7.2%
Male	177	52.8%
Female	158	47.2%

== Mascot ==
The school's mascot is the Commodore, named after Commodore Oliver Hazard Perry. A mural depicting The Commodore faces the school on the old Rich Bedding Building. It was commissioned by business owner Bill Schmidt, painted by The MLK Project and designed by Perry Alumni Bill Gandy (85) and Kimberley Robinson-Gandy (86).

== Academics ==
Perry consists of grades 9–12. The school comprises three schools (programs): STEAM, CTE, and Military Science/JROTC.

=== Standardized tests ===
As of 2019, Perry students performed below the state average in statewide tests.

== Alma mater ==
Our Perry High Dear Alma Mater Thou
Keep Watchful Eye Atop The Summit's Brow
Thou Shalt To Us A Firm Foundation Be
Guide, Counsel'r, Friend Throughout Eternity
And As The Years Go Swiftly Gliding By
Still Thou Shalt to Be Our Own Dear Perry High
Chorus:
All Hail To Perry, We'll Honor And Praise Thee'
To Alma Mater We'll Ever Be True
All Hail To Perry, We'll Honor And Praise Thee'
We'll Love Forever The White And Blue

== Notable alumni ==
- Glenn Beckert (class of 1958), Major League Baseball player for Chicago Cubs and San Diego Padres.
- Eddie Benton (class of 1992), basketball player and coach.
- Ron Carter (class of 1975), basketball player.
- Richard Foster, modernist architect.
- Boo Jackson (class of 2000), basketball player.
- Rod Rutherford, quarterback for the NCAA's Pitt Panthers and the NFL's Carolina Panthers and Pittsburgh Steelers
