= Cincinnati Swarm =

Arena football team in Ohio, U.S.

Logo

General information
- Founded: 2002
- Folded: 2004
- Headquartered: U.S. Bank Arena in Cincinnati, Ohio
- Colors: Navy blue, gold and black
- Mascot: Buzz (Bee)

Personnel
- Owner: Mark Hamister
- Head coach: Chris MacKeown

Team history
- Cincinnati Swarm (2003)

Home fields
- U.S. Bank Arena (2003)

League / conference affiliations
- af2 (2003): National Conference (2003); Midwest Division (2003)

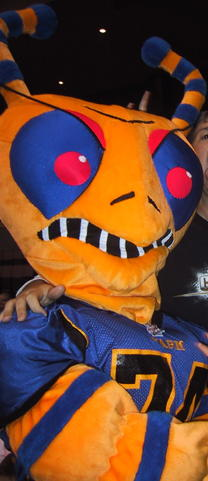
Cincinnati Swarm Mascot (Buzz)

The Cincinnati Swarm was a professional arena football franchise based in Cincinnati, Ohio. They were members of the Midwest Division of the National Conference of the af2. The Swarm joined the af2 as an expansion franchise in 2003 along with the Green Bay Blizzard. In 2003, the Swarm went 7–9, second in the Midwest Division. Despite their modest record, and finishing second in their division, they failed to make the playoffs. Cincinnati's attempt at arena football failed, and the Swarm folded after one year due to poor attendance. Ten years earlier, Cincinnati was home to the Cincinnati Rockers from 1992 to 1993, and like the Swarm, they folded shortly after their inception. Despite the Swarm's failure, the city of Cincinnati would get another af2 franchise in the form of the now-defunct Cincinnati Jungle Kats, who suffered the same fate as the Swarm.

== Season-by-Season ==
ArenaCup Champions	ArenaCup Appearances	Division champions	Playoff berth

Season	League	Conference	Division	Regular season			Postseason results
Season	League	Conference	Division	Finish	Wins	Losses	Postseason results
Cincinnati Swarm
2003	AF2	National	Midwestern	2nd	7	9	

== Roster ==
Cincinnati Swarm roster
Quarterbacks: -- Danny Smith; Fullbacks/Linebackers: -- Miguel Merritt; -- Nick Rice; -- Aaron Smith; Wide receivers/Defensive backs: -- Ramon Davenport; 18 Anthony Payton; -- Ryan Russell; -- Mutsumi Takahashi	Offensive/Defensive linemen: -- John Adleta; -- Matt Goreski; -- Mathias Hauck; -- Chris Knipper; -- Kurt Murphy; 90 Derrick Shepard; -- Victor Vrabel	Wide Receivers/Linebackers: 3 Chris Archie; -- Mike Leeks; 17 Andy Payne; -- James Scott; Defensive specialists: -- Satoru Abe; -- Tony Briggs; Kickers: Currently vacant	Injured reserve: Currently vacant; Rookies in italics 19 Active, 0 Inactive

== Head coach ==
Chris MacKeown - After the Swarm folded in 2003 MacKeown went on to be the offensive coordinator for the Louisville Fire (af2) for the 2004 and 2005 seasons. He was Special Teams coordinator for the Columbus Destroyers (AFL) in 2006 and the Austin Wranglers in 2007. In 2007, the Wranglers folded and MacKeown was hired to be the head coach of the Amarillo Dusters (af2), taking the Dusters from a bottom four af2 team to the American Conference ArenaCup Championship game in his only season with the Dusters in 2008. Following the 2008 championship run with the Dusters, MacKeown was hired by John Elway to be the offensive coordinator for the Colorado Crush (AFL).MVP anthony briggs joined the swarm in 2003 after playing simi pro football five years set school record at Quarter tech university 1980 at age 38 ran most impressive 4.4 forty lead the league with 3 kick returns TD along with 4 interceptions TD
