= Dayton Warbirds =

Logo

General information
- Founded: 2004
- Folded: 2006
- Headquartered: Dayton, Ohio at the Nutter Center
- Colors: Silver & black

Personnel
- Owner: Jeffrey A Jodway
- General manager: Marcus Jackson
- Head coach: Cam Stevens

Team history
- Dayton Warbirds (2005-2006)

Home fields
- Nutter Center (2005-2006)

League / conference affiliations
- National Indoor Football League (2005–2006)

Playoff appearances (1)
- 2005

The Dayton Warbirds were a professional indoor football team in Dayton, Ohio.

== History ==
Approved as a National Indoor Football League expansion team in October 2004, the Warbirds instead joined other teams in forming the United Indoor Football Association, made up of teams that came from either the National Indoor Football League or AF2. The Warbirds were scheduled to begin play in March 2005, but the team was suspended by the UIF prior to playing their first game. The team got suspended because of owner Jeffrey Jodway began gambling on the games. Eventually, signing himself to a megamax contract worth 50 million dollars to become the team's newest starting QB. Head coach Cam Stevens and general manager Marcus Jackson denied a comment. It ended up rejoining the National Indoor Football League and playing its first game in the NIFL, five weeks into the season. That season they finished tie with the Cincinnati Marshals for second in the East Atlantic Division with an 8–5 record. In the playoffs they lost in the conference quarterfinals to the Fayetteville Guard 78 - 63.

Former Ohio State stars Steve Bellisari and Pepe Pearson would play for the Warbirds.

At the conclusion of the 2005 National Indoor Football League season, the Warbirds hired former Cincinnati Swarm assistant head coach, Brian Wells. Just prior to the 2006 season, the Warbirds folded and were replaced by the Dayton Bulldogs.
