= The Marshals (NIFL) =

Indoor American football team (2004–2007)

- Sport: Indoor American football
- Founded: 2004
- Last season: 2007
- League: National Indoor Football League
- Based in: Dayton, Ohio
- Arena: Hara Arena
- Colors: Black, blue, silver
- Owner: Doug Hortman
- Managing director: P.J. Conboy
- Head coach: Derrick Davidson
- Dancers: Diamond Deputies
- Mascot: Touchdown

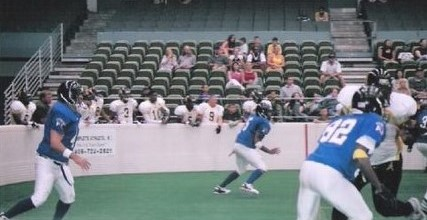
2004 Waco Marshals vs Beaumont Drillers

The Marshals were a professional indoor football team based out of Dayton, Ohio. They played their 2007 home games out of Hara Arena in Dayton, Ohio, but are more famous for playing as the Cincinnati Marshals at U.S. Bank Arena for two seasons. The Marshals played their 2004 inaugural season in Waco, Texas, as the Waco Marshals.

== History ==
The Marshals started out as the Waco Marshals in 2004, but finished their inaugural season with a disappointing 2–8 record. For the next season they relocated to Cincinnati and became the Cincinnati Marshals.

Marshals players and coaches of note: Brett Dietz, Ickey Woods, Ray Jackson, Lance Olberding, Wayne Walker, Ed Biles, Lew Carpenter, Odell James, Ron Carpenter, Hubbard Alexander, Rayshawn Askew, Louis Fite.

== The 2004 season ==
The NIFL took over operations midway through the 2004 season after realizing that the ownership had "floated" a phony check for the franchise and the league had to assume financial burden to a team that had never paid a penny to even join the league due to the fraudulent payment by ownership. The league then agreed to sell the rights to Tony Williams and Manuel Ramos, who was serving as the Defensive Coordinator and Special Teams Coordinator respectively, at the time. Williams and Ramos reign as owners didn't last much longer after it was found that they could not make payments either to the H.O.T. and had bounced employee paychecks, did not pay bills to companies for services and did not have the required insurance for the players; same as their predecessors. Several new players were signed, as the NIFL managed the Marshals for the remainder of the 2004 season.

== The 2005 season ==
In 2005, owner H. P. Patterson first surrendered the team after he did not pay players for well over a month, and then fled the United States entirely after being suspected of money laundering. The mismanagement resulted in the resignation of the team's head coach, former Houston Oilers head coach Ed Biles, and the dissolution of the Diamond Deputies cheerleading squad, after they claimed weeks of unpaid game checks. In addition, the Assistant Coaches Hubbard Alexander and Lew Carpenter, as well as the Equipment Director Josh Reasoner followed Coach Biles out.

Despite all this, new head coach Tony Wells, quarterback Brett Dietz and running back Rayshawn Askew led the team to the finish of an 8–6 record, which tied them for 2nd in their division with the Dayton Warbirds. Former St. Louis Rams Super Bowl champion Ron Carpenter was signed mid-season to help make the playoff run. In the First round of playoffs they upset the River City Rage, who was ranked first in the same division as the Marshals with the Marshals with 67 points and the Rage with 64 points. In the next playoff round they defeated the Fayetteville Guard 70 to 69. In the Atlantic Conference Championship they had no such luck, falling to the Rome Renegades 51 to 41.

In 2005, Rayshawn Askew broke or tied many league records that year en route to being named an All-Star. He tied the single season touchdown record of 46 when he scored three touchdowns against Wyoming on July 4, 2005. The three touchdowns allowed Askew to set a new league record for scoring with 282 points, overcoming the mark of 276 points set by Baron Dockery of the Ohio Valley Greyhounds in 2002. Askew finished the regular season leading the league in scoring (282 points), touchdowns (46), rushing yards (719 yards) and all-purpose yards (2236 yards)

Former Cincinnati Marshals quarterback Brett Dietz would move up to play for the Tampa Bay Storm of the Arena Football League. He won Co-Rookie of the Year in the AFL for the 2007 season. The Marshals have been mentioned on ESPN when they talk about Dietz's career.

== The 2006 season ==
In the following months, the team's status was left largely undetermined. On December 20, 2005, after many months of speculation, the Marshals announced a return to the NIFL for the 2006 season with a new ownership group led by Doug Hortman and P.J. Conboy, a new coaching staff led by head coach Steve Carpenter and the return of the Diamond Deputies. Former NFL star Ickey Woods served as an assistant coach in 2006 and former Tennessee Titan Ray Jackson led the Marshals in rushing. The team matched their 2005 regular season output, going 8–6 in the season, and clinched the #5 seed in the Atlantic Conference playoffs.

== 2006 playoffs ==
The Marshals could not avoid the game of "musical teams" that seemed to doom the league (the consequence of a failed expansion project) even before the playoffs began. Cincinnati's 5th seed was supposed to equal a road trip to a rematch of a late-season loss to Osceola. Osceola, however, commenced a tug-of-war with the league and the Marshals regarding the site of the game. Osceola's home arena was hosting a rodeo the weekend of the first round, and asked Cincinnati to host the game. However, Cincinnati had been thrown out of their arena due to setup for a concert. Osceola offered a compromise, where the Marshals would travel to Lakeland, Florida, but team ownership shot down the idea and forfeited the game.

A few days after the announced forfeit, it was revealed that Osceola failed to file paperwork so they could advance into the playoffs. Osceola was given a choice: either play Cincinnati in St. Louis with the winner playing the River City Rage the next night, or forfeit the game and allow Cincinnati to advance to play River City. Osceola declined, and Cincinnati was allowed to advance. With only three days and one practice to prepare for the game, Cincinnati traveled to St. Louis, where the Rage defeated the Marshals at Scottrade Center, 43–30, ending the Marshals' season.

== The 2007 season ==
On October 18, 2006, it was announced that the AF2 had granted a new expansion team to the U.S. Bank Arena, in the form of the Cincinnati Jungle Kats, who took over the indoor football contract for the arena. As a consequence, the Marshals had no arena to call their own. It was originally thought that they were moving to Wall2Wall Soccer in nearby Mason for 2007, . However, they moved to Hara Arena in Dayton for 2007, and changing their name to The Marshals. .

The announcement was even more of a shock to players and staff, seeing as no formal conference was given, no owner-team meeting was ever held, and all but owner Doug Hortman and his assistant were made to research the information through a short press release on a skeletal form of the Marshals website, leaving fans irate. The Marshals went quietly up to Dayton, a move similar to the 1983 overnight move of the Baltimore Colts to Indianapolis.

The 2007 season was played, but was not completed in full, due to the collapse of the NIFL. At the time the team was 2–4. Owner Doug Hortman was interviewed by the Dayton Daily News, in which he accused the NIFL of lying to him and other owners about league development and scheduling. Hortman would then go on to promise the return of the team for 2008, which proved to be a lie. This was the same promise Hortman had made when he announced during halftime of the final home game in 2006 that the team would return to Cincinnati in 2007.

However, the promise was once again kept unfulfilled, and the team went away quietly, along with the rest of the NIFL.

== Season-by-season ==
Season records
| Season | W | L | T | Finish | Playoff results |
|---|---|---|---|---|---|
Waco Marshals
| 2004 | 2 | 8 | 0 | 5th Atlantic Southern | – |
Cincinnati Marshals
| 2005 | 8 | 6 | 0 | 3rd Atlantic Eastern | Won Atlantic Conference Quarter Final (River City); Won Atlantic Semi-Final (Fayetteville); Lost Atlantic Final (Rome) |
| 2006 | 8 | 6 | 0 | 2nd Atlantic Eastern | Won Atlantic Quarter Final (Osceola Football) (Forfeit); Lost Atlantic Semi-Final (River City) |
The Marshals
| 2007 | 2 | 5 | 0 | 3rd Atlantic | – |
| Totals | 23 | 27 | 0 | (including playoffs) | |

== Team history ==
=== 2004 season roster ===
2004 Waco Marshals roster
| Quarterbacks: 5 Odell James; 8 Eric Stanford; 8 Martin Reyna; Running backs: 45 David Banks; 3 John Henry; 7 Louis Fite; Wide receivers: 88 Chris Isedore; 83 Christopher Allen; 80 Lee McCormick; 9 Darrell Wilkins; 89 Franklin Paul; 87 Reginald Boyd | Offensive/Defensive linemen: 90 Chris Gonzales; 91 Adrian Barnes; 66 Jody Cantu; 67 Kenneth Hopkins; 52 Louis Arenas; 77 Chad Franklin; 55 Juan Henry; 51 Wade Merindina | Linebackers: 47 Jason Haliburt; 41 Michael Bangs; 40 Mark Ricker; 9 Ben Carter; Defensive backs: 22 Damon Bouie; 25 Corey Mathis; 21 Corey Bennett; 3 Hallart Keaton; 37 Lance Goree; 21 Willie Freeney; 2 Anthony Harden; Kickers: 1 Brandon Diebolt; 1 Danny Magana; 6 Rolf Shaefer | Injured reserve Practice Squad updated July 26, 2004; 21 Active, 0 Inactive |

=== 2004 ===
| Date | Opponent | Result | Att. | Record |
|---|---|---|---|---|
Regular Season
| March 20 | Wichita Falls Thunder | L, 32–39 | 1,700 | 0–1 |
| March 27 | Evansville BlueCats | L, 7–59 | 4,504 | 0–2 |
| April 10 | Oklahoma Crude | W, 54–44 | N/A | 1–2 |
| April 17 | Tupelo Fire Ants | L, 41–61 | 1,928 | 1–3 |
| April 24 | Lake Charles Landsharks | W, 32–29 | N/A | 2–3 |
| May 1 | Beaumont Drillers | L, 42–44 | N/A | 2–4 |
| May 23 | Beaumont Drillers | L, 3–73 | 1,043 | 2–5 |
| June 12 | Oklahoma Crude | L, 12–67 | N/A | 2–6 |
| June 19 | Houma Bayou Bucks | L, 0–74 | 2,250 | 2–7 |
| June 26 | Lexington Horseman | L, 18–116 | 4,920 | 2–8 |

=== 2005 ===
| Date | Opponent | Result | Att. | Record |
|---|---|---|---|---|
Regular Season
| March 26 | Beaumont | L, 24–36 | 6,581 | 0–1 |
| April 2 | River City | L, 53–55 | 3,163 | 0–2 |
| April 9 | Fayetteville | W, 57–54 | 4,208 | 1–2 |
| April 16 | at Beaumont | W, 59–52 | N/A | 2–2 |
| April 23 | Dayton | W, 81–74 | N/A | 3–2 |
| April 30 | New Jersey | W, 65–13 | 3,689 | 4–2 |
| May 9 | at Dayton | L, 30–63 | N/A | 4–3 |
| May 21 | at Dayton | OTL, 53–56 | 3,800 | 4–4 |
| May 28 | at Fayetteville | L, 34–48 | 1,634 | 4–5 |
| June 4 | Rome | W, 43–33 | 3,682 | 5–5 |
| June 10 | at River City | L, 54–75 | 3,681 | 5–6 |
| June 18 | at New Jersey | W, Forfeit | N/A | 6–6 |
| June 25 | Tri-Cities | W, 52–42 | 3,501 | 7–6 |
| July 4 | at Wyoming | W, 47–45 | 3,496 | 8–6 |
First Round
| July 10 | at River City | W, 67–64 | N/A | 9–6 |
Divisional Round
| July 16 | at Fayetteville | W, 70–69 | 3,443 | 10–6 |
Atlantic Conference Championship
| July 23 | Rome | L, 41–51 | N/A | 10–7 |

=== 2006 ===
| Date | Opponent | Result | Record |
|---|---|---|---|
Regular Season
| March 26 | at River City | L, 34–76 | 0–1 |
| April 1 | DAYTON | W 62–28 | 1–1 |
| April 9 | at Dayton | L, 32–54 | 1–2 |
| April 15 | at Big Sky | W, 41–14 | 2–2 |
| April 22 | RIVER CITY | L, 43–62 | 2–3 |
| April 29 | WEST PALM BEACH | W, 47–44 | 3–3 |
| May 5 | at Tennessee | W 34–24 | 4–3 |
| May 13 | at Fayetteville | L 24–70 | 4–4 |
| May 20 | MONTGOMERY | OTW, 47–46 | 5–4 |
| May 27 | TENNESSEE | W, 82–0 | 6–4 |
| June 10 | OSCEOLA | L, 26–58 | 6–5 |
| June 17 | at Arkansas | W, 27–12 | 7–5 |
| June 25 | GREENSBORO | W, 64–41 | 8–6 |
| July 1 | at Greensboro | L, 24–39 | 8–6 |
First Round
| DNP | (at) Osceola | W, Forfeit | 9–6 |
Divisional Round
| July 16 | at River City | L, 30–43 | 9–7 |

=== 2007 ===
| Date | Opponent | Home/Away | Result |
|---|---|---|---|
| March 17 | Columbia Stingers | Away | Won 49–34 |
| March 24 | Columbia Stingers | Home | Won 31–19 |
| March 31 | Greensboro Revolution | Away | Lost 54–64 |
| April 14 | Fayetteville Guard | Away | Lost 14–77 |
| April 28 | Fayetteville Guard | Home | Lost 27–53 |
| May 5 | Greensboro Revolution | Home | Lost 30–43 |
