= Chicago Slaughter =

American football team

Logo

General information
- Founded: 2006
- Folded: 2013
- Headquartered: Sears Centre in Hoffman Estates, Illinois
- Colors: Black, red, white, silver
- Mascot: Sergeant Slaughter
- SlaughterFootball.com

Personnel
- Owners: David Flood, John Butera, Arney Silvestri
- CEO: Arney Silvestri
- General manager: Alan Perkins
- Head coach: Steve McMichael
- President: Arney Silvestri

Team history
- Chicago Slaughter (2007–2013)

Home fields
- Sears Centre (2007–2013)

League / conference affiliations
- Continental Indoor Football League (2007–2009): Great Lakes Conference (2007–2008); West Division (2008–2009); Indoor Football League (2010–2013): United Conference (2010–2013); Central North (2010); Great Lakes (2011)

Championships
- League championships: 1; 2009
- Division championships: 2; 2008, 2009

Playoff appearances (5)
- 2007, 2008, 2009, 2010, 2011

The Chicago Slaughter were an American professional football team based in Hoffman Estates, Illinois. Having been inactive since 2013, the franchise was a part of the CIFL from 2007 to 2009, winning the championship in 2009. The Slaughter joined the Indoor Football League at the start of the 2010 season. The Slaughter played their home games at the Sears Centre in Hoffman Estates.

== Team history ==
=== Formation of the team ===
The original team name was considered to be the "Foxes", until Steve McMichael suggested they should have a name which reflected the working people of Chicago like the meatpackers of the old Chicago Stockyards. They play their home games at the Sears Centre in Hoffman Estates, Illinois. The team was originally intended to be a part of United Indoor Football, but did not join due to a dispute with the league.

The team interviewed McMichael and William "The Refrigerator" Perry from the 1985 Chicago Bears Super Bowl XX championship team for the head coaching position. The aim was to appeal to local fans' affinity for McMichael and Perry and to take advantage of McMichael's love of hard-nosed, tough football. McMichael accepted the job as head coach, while Perry rejected the offer as Director of Football Operations (citing no desire to relocate back to Chicago).

=== 2007–2009 ===
During the team's inaugural 2007 season in the CIFL, the Slaughter recorded an overall record of 10–4. After going 9–3 in the regular season, the Slaughter reached the divisional semi-finals in the league playoffs.

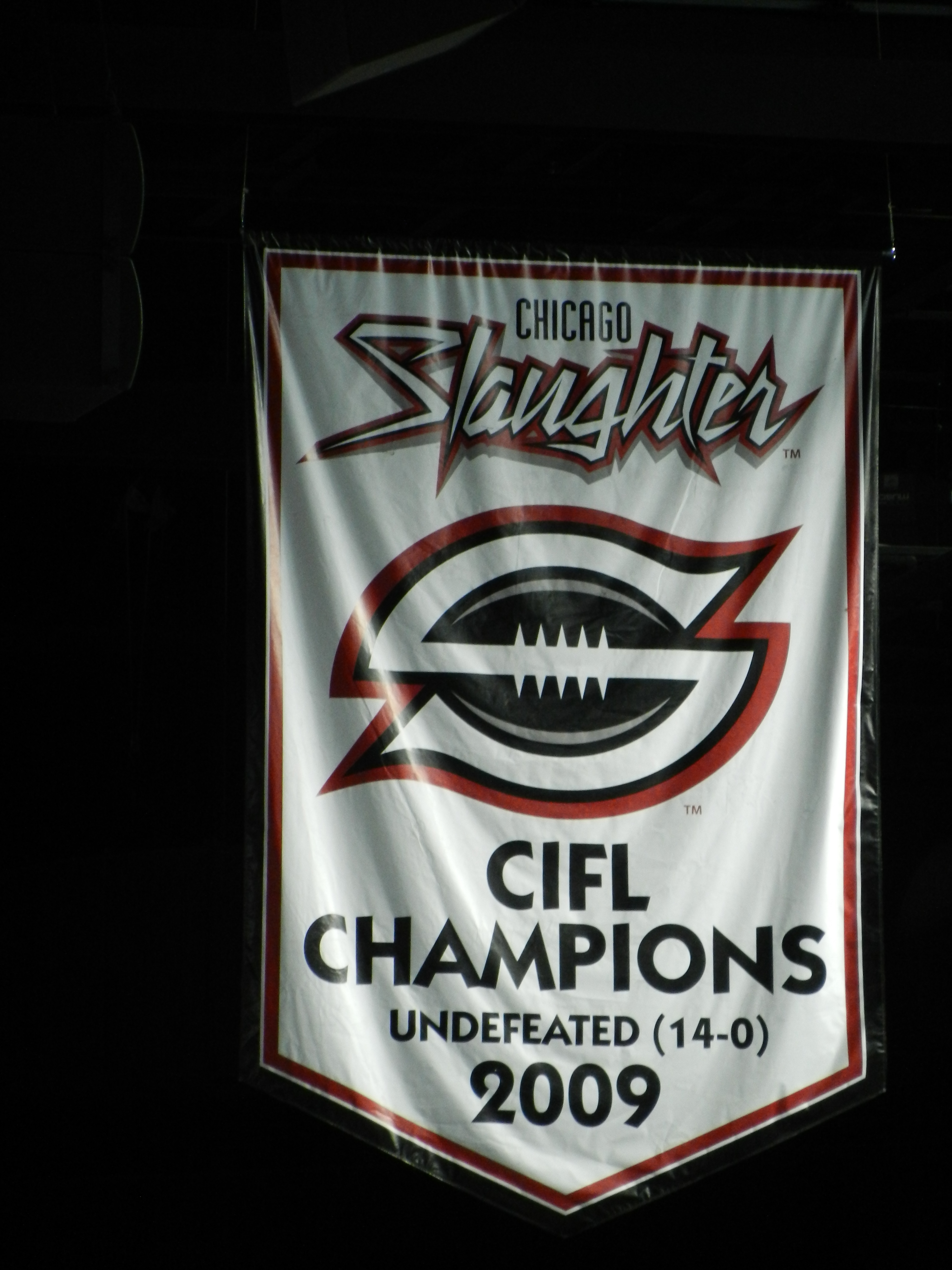

The 2008 season saw the Chicago Slaughter suffer a slow start, going 2–3 in their first 5 games. However, the Slaughter rallied around head coach Steve McMichael and won 6 out of their next 7 games to finish the regular season at 8–4, winning the Western division title. Unfortunately, the Slaughter then suffered a disappointing first round playoff loss to divisional rival, Rock River, to end their season.

In 2009, the Slaughter signed seven players from the Chicago Rush when the Arena Football League cancelled the 2009 season, including Donovan Morgan, Reggie Gray, Bobby Sippio, and eventual CIFL league MVP Russ Michna. The Chicago Slaughter averaged over 65 points per game and outscored their opponents by almost an average of 30 points per game, going 14-0 for the season. On June 27, 2009, the Slaughter won the CIFL championship.

After the completion of the 2009 season, rumors began circulating that the Slaughter would be leaving the CIFL to join the IFL for the 2010 season. On October 27, 2009, the Chicago Slaughter announced that it was moving to the Indoor Football League, a much larger and more national league.

=== 2010 ===
On January 7, 2010, the Chicago Slaughter announced that Jarrett Payton, son of NFL running back Walter Payton, would be playing for the team in 2010. In February 2010, former Chicago Bears quarterback Jim McMahon joined the Chicago Slaughter as new team owner.

=== 2013 ===
The team signed Juice Williams to be their quarterback.

=== 2014 ===
For the 2014 season, the Slaughter re-joined the CIFL. Before the season began, the Slaughter announced that they would not play the 2014 season. By this time, the Slaughter had ceased operations.

== Notable players ==
=== Former players ===
- L. J. Castile
- Reggie Gray
- Jon Kowalyshen
- Russ Michna
- Donovan Morgan
- Jarrett Payton
- Matt Rahn
- Dennison Robinson
- Bobby Sippio
- Sidney Lewis
- Juice Williams
- Nick Cosentino
- Tim McManigal

=== Awards and honors ===
The following is a list of all Chicago Slaughter players who have won league Awards

Season	Player	Position	Award
2009	Russ Michna	QB	CIFL MVP
2009	Russ Michna	QB	CIFL Offensive Player of the Year
2013	Cody Kirby	QB	IFL Rookie of the Year

== Head coaches ==
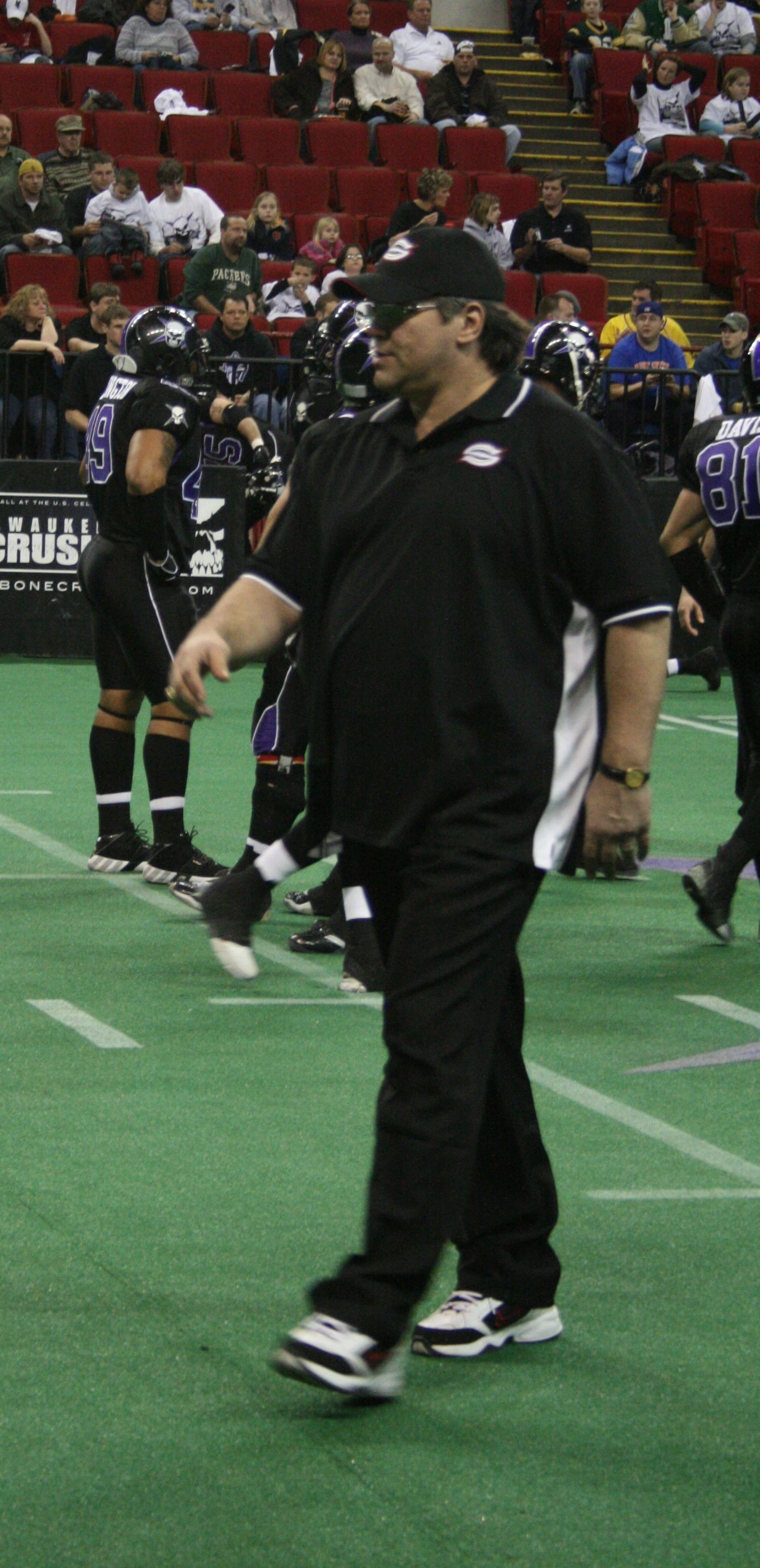
Steve McMichael in 2008

Note: Statistics are correct through the end of the 2013 CIFL season.

Name	Term	Regular season				Playoffs		Awards
Name	Term	W	L	T	Win%	W	L	Awards
Steve McMichael	2007–2013	58	34	0	.630	4	4	
Michael Oliver	2014	0	0	0	–	0	0	

== Season-by-season ==
League champions	Conference champions	Division champions	Wild card berth	League leader

Season	Team	League	Conference	Division	Regular season				Postseason results
Season	Team	League	Conference	Division	Finish	Wins	Losses	Ties	Postseason results
2007	2007	CIFL	Great Lakes		3rd	9	3	0	Won Great Lakes Qualifier (Miami Valley) 60-28; Lost Divisional Semifinal (Kalamazoo) 51-40
2008	2008	CIFL	Great Lakes	West	1st	8	4	0	Lost Divisional Playoffs (Rock River) 54-39
2009	2009	CIFL		West	1st	12	0	0	Won Division Championship (Wisconsin) 63-19; Won CIFL Championship Game (Fort Wayne) 58-48
2010	2010	IFL	United	Central North	3rd	6	8	0	Won Round 1 (Green Bay) 46-39; Lost Conference Semifinals (Sioux Falls) 47-33
2011	2011	IFL	United	Great Lakes	3rd	8	6	0	Lost Round 1 (Reading) 76-33
2012	2012	IFL	United		6th	6	8	0	
2013	2013	IFL	United		3rd	9	5	0	
Totals						58	34	0	All-time regular season record (2007–2013)
Totals						4	4	-	All-time postseason record (2007–2013)
Totals						62	38	0	All-time regular season and postseason record (2007–2013)
