= 2009 Continental Indoor Football League season =

2009 CIFL season
- League: Continental Indoor Football League
- Sport: Indoor Football

Regular season
- Season champions: Chicago Slaughter
- Season MVP: Russ Michna, CHI

League postseason
- Eastern champions: Fort Wayne Freedom
- Eastern runners-up: Marion Mayhem
- Western champions: Chicago Slaughter
- Western runners-up: Wisconsin Wolfpack

CIFL Championship Game
- Champions: Chicago Slaughter
- Runners-up: Fort Wayne Freedom
- Finals MVP: Donovan Morgan (CHI)

CIFL seasons
- ← 2008 2010 →

The 2009 Continental Indoor Football League season was the league's fourth overall season. The regular season began on Friday, March 6. The league champion was the Chicago Slaughter.

== Standings ==
2009 Continental Indoor Football League
Team	Overall				Division			
Team	W	L	T	PCT	W	L	T	PCT
East Division
Marion Mayhem-y	9	3	0	.750	8	1	0	.889
Fort Wayne Freedom-x	6	5	0	.545	5	2	0	.294
Wheeling Wildcats	2	10	0	.167	2	5	0	.286
Miami Valley Silverbacks	0	10	0	.000	0	7	0	.000
West Division
Chicago Slaughter-y	12	0	0	1.000	8	0	0	1.000
Wisconsin Wolfpack-x	7	5	0	.583	4	4	0	.500
Rock River Raptors	7	5	0	.583	3	5	0	.167
Milwaukee Bonecrushers	3	8	0	.273	1	7	0	.167

== Playoffs ==
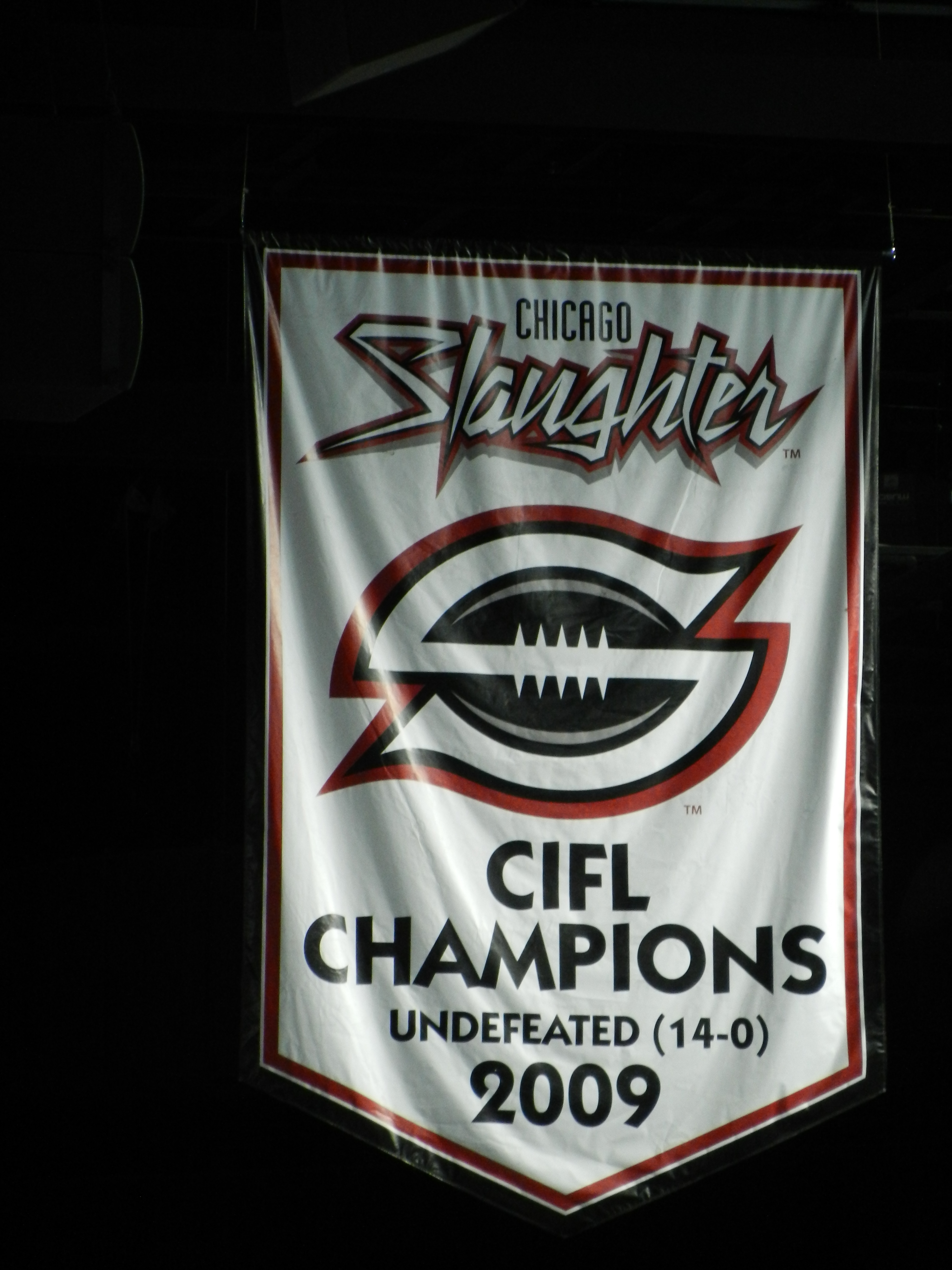
The 2009 Chicago Slaughter CIFL Championship banner

Semifinals
2	Fort Wayne	49
1	Marion	40
2	Wisconsin	19
1	Chicago	63

CIFL Championship Game
E2	Fort Wayne	48
W1	Chicago	58

== 2009 award winners ==
- CIFL Most Valuable Player - Russ Michna, Chicago Slaughter
- Offensive Player of the Year - Russ Michna, Chicago Slaughter
- Defensive Player of the Year - Bryceon Lawrence, Marion Mayhem
- Special Teams Player of the Year -
- Coach of the Year - Matt Land, Fort Wayne Freedom
