= 2014 Northern Kentucky River Monsters season =

- Owner: Jill Chitwood
- General manager: John Jackson
- Head coach: Brian Schmidt (fired on February 22; 2–1 record); Mike Goodpaster (interim)
- Home stadium: The Bank of Kentucky Center

Results
- Record: 7–3
- Division place: 2nd
- Playoffs: Lost South Division Championship 56-40 (Blue Racers)

The 2014 Northern Kentucky River Monsters season was the second and final season for the Continental Indoor Football League (CIFL) franchise.

After a two-year layoff, the River Monsters announced that they would be returning to an active team, joining the Continental Indoor Football League for the 2014 season. Head coach Brian Schmidt was fired on February 22, and was replaced by defensive coordinator Mike Goodpaster. Goodpaster was able to salvage the season after losing quarterback Jared Lorenzen to injury in Week 2, going 5–2 down the stretch, defeating the Dayton Sharks the final week of the season to clinch the final South Division playoff spot.

== Schedule ==
=== Regular season ===
Week	Date	Kickoff	Opponent	Results		Game site
Week	Date	Kickoff	Opponent	Final score	Team record	Game site
1	February 3	7:30 p.m. EST	at Bluegrass Warhorses	W 36–20	1–0	Alltech Arena
2	February 8	7:30 P.M. EST	Erie Explosion	L 30–42	1–1	The Bank of Kentucky Center
3	February 16	2:00 P.M. EST	Bluegrass Warhorses	W 32–23	2–1	The Bank of Kentucky Center
4	Bye					
5	March 2	4:00 P.M. EST	at Marion Blue Racers	L 20–27	2–2	Veterans Memorial Coliseum
6	Bye					
7	March 15	7:30 P.M. EST	Dayton Sharks	L 45–65	2–3	The Bank of Kentucky Center
8	March 23	4:00 p.m. EST	at Kentucky Xtreme	W 2–0 (Forfeit)	3–3	Freedom Hall
9	March 29	7:30 P.M. EST	at Port Huron Patriots	W 35–14	4–3	McMorran Arena
10	April 5	7:30 p.m. EST	Kentucky Xtreme	W 70–22	5–3	The Bank of Kentucky Center
11	Bye					
12	April 19	7:30 p.m. EST	Chicago Blitz	W 73–50	6–3	The Bank of Kentucky Center
13	Bye					
14	May 3	7:30 p.m. EST	at Dayton Sharks	W 36–24	7–3	Hara Arena

=== Standings ===
2014 Continental Indoor Football League
Team	Overall				Division			
Team	W	L	T	PCT	W	L	T	PCT
North Division
y-Saginaw Sting	9	1	0	.900	6	1	0	.857
x-Erie Explosion	8	2	0	.800	5	1	0	.833
Chicago Blitz	7	3	0	.700	4	2	0	.667
z-Port Huron Patriots	1	8	0	.111	1	6	0	.143
z-Detroit Thunder	0	8	0	.000	0	6	0	.000
South Division
y-Marion Blue Racers	8	2	0	.800	6	0	0	1.000
x-Northern Kentucky River Monsters	7	3	0	.700	5	2	0	.714
Dayton Sharks	6	4	0	.600	4	3	0	.571
z-Bluegrass Warhorses	1	7	0	.125	1	5	0	.167
z-Kentucky Xtreme	0	5	0	.000	0	4	0	.000

- y - clinched division title
- x - clinched playoff spot
- z - ceased operations during season

== Postseason ==
Week	Date	Kickoff	Opponent	Results		Game site
Week	Date	Kickoff	Opponent	Final score	Team record	Game site
South Division Championship	May 10	7:30 P.M. EST	at Marion Blue Racers	L 40–56	0–1	Veterans Memorial Coliseum

== Final roster ==
2014 Northern Kentucky River Monsters roster
Quarterbacks: 10 Antonio Davis; Running backs: 14 Clay Cunningham; 6 Maurice Douse; Wide receivers: 11 Aric Evans; 8 Willie Idlette; 3 Ricardo Lenhart; 5 Ahoma Maxwell; 9 Shawn McGarity	Offensive linemen: 77 Bob Beeler; 55 Thomas Gholston; 74 Matt Money; Defensive linemen: 57 D'arrell Brown; 52 Rico Middlebrooks; 99 Luke Scarborough	Linebackers: 1 David James; 48 Tommie McBride; 37 Santino Turnbow; Defensive backs: 12 Butch Abshire; 32 David Hampton; 4 T. J. Harris; 21 Marcus Lancaster; 23 Dekota Marshall; 7 Jeff Ward; Kickers: 13 Dustin Zink	Injured reserve: 22 Jared Lorenzen QB (IR); Exempt list: Currently vacant; Rookies in italics Roster updated May 3, 2014; 24 Active, 1 Inactive
