= 2014 Chicago Blitz season =

- General manager: Chuck Satterlee
- Head coach: Mike Oliver
- Home stadium: Odeum Expo Center & Intra Soccer

Results
- Record: 7-3
- Division place: 3rd
- Playoffs: did not qualify

The 2014 Chicago Blitz season was the first season for the Continental Indoor Football League (CIFL) franchise.

The Blitz came into existence in January 2014, after the Chicago Slaughter announced that they would be sitting out the 2014 season just one month before the regular season began.

== Roster ==
2014 Chicago Blitz roster
Quarterbacks: 19 Tommy Kudra; 7 Juice Williams; Running backs: 25 Bryant Picassio; Wide receivers: 5 A. J. Allen; 11 David Brown; 17 Rodney Brown; 4 Kent McDonald	Offensive linemen: -- Anthony Bullock; 88 Tim Mueller; 87 Brandon Woodlock; Defensive linemen: 18 Shonn Bell; 8 DeAndre Mosley; 99 Marques Walton; 10 Neil Wilcox	Linebackers: 23 Sam Fornelli; 1 Malik Jackson; Defensive backs: 3 Marvin Johnson; 24 Brandon Onuselogu; 21 Marvin Rhone; 12 Keith Woodson; Kickers: 9 Julie Harshbarger	Injured reserve: currently vacant; Exempt list: -- Jared McGriff-Culver (Exempt); 10 Julian Williams WR (Exempt); Practice squad: currently vacant; rookies in italics; Roster updated March 10, 2014; 22 Active, 2 Inactive

== Schedule ==
=== Regular season ===
Week	Date	Kickoff	Opponent	Results		Game site
Week	Date	Kickoff	Opponent	Final score	Team record	Game site
1	Bye					
2	February 9	7:00 P.M. EST	Saginaw Sting	L 25-42	0-1	Intra Soccer (Elgin, IL)
3	February 17	7:00 P.M. EST	at Kentucky Xtreme	W 52-18	1-1	Freedom Hall
4	February 23	2:00 P.M. EST	at Erie Explosion	L 35-44	1-2	Erie Insurance Arena
5	Bye					
6	March 2	7:00 P.M. EST	Detroit Thunder	W 59-6	2-2	Intra Soccer (Elgin, IL)
7	March 16	5:00 P.M. EST	Port Huron Patriots	W 55-15	3-2	Odeum Expo Center
8	March 23	7:00 p.m. EST	Dayton Sharks	W 48-32	4-2	Intra Soccer (Elgin, IL)
9	March 30	5:00 P.M. EST	Kentucky Xtreme	W 2-0 (Forfeit)	5-2	Intra Soccer (Elgin, IL)
10	April 5	7:30 P.M. EST	at Port Huron Patriots	W 43-34	6-2	McMorran Arena
11	Bye					
12	April 19	7:30 p.m. EST	at Northern Kentucky River Monsters	L 6-76	6-3	The Bank of Kentucky Center
13	April 26	7:30 p.m. EST	at Saginaw Sting	W 34-28	7-3	Dow Event Center
14	Bye					

The team's final contest against the Sting ruined the Sting's chances of a perfect season.

=== Standings ===
2014 Continental Indoor Football League
Team	Overall				Division			
Team	W	L	T	PCT	W	L	T	PCT
North Division
y-Saginaw Sting	9	1	0	.900	6	1	0	.857
x-Erie Explosion	8	2	0	.800	5	1	0	.833
Chicago Blitz	7	3	0	.700	4	2	0	.667
z-Port Huron Patriots	1	8	0	.111	1	6	0	.143
z-Detroit Thunder	0	8	0	.000	0	6	0	.000
South Division
y-Marion Blue Racers	8	2	0	.800	6	0	0	1.000
x-Northern Kentucky River Monsters	7	3	0	.700	5	2	0	.714
Dayton Sharks	6	4	0	.600	4	3	0	.571
z-Bluegrass Warhorses	1	7	0	.125	1	5	0	.167
z-Kentucky Xtreme	0	5	0	.000	0	4	0	.000

- y - clinched division title
- x - clinched playoff spot
- z - ceased operations during season

== Coaching staff ==
2014 Chicago Blitz staff
Front office: Field Manager - Scott Ruden; Director of Player Personnel - Vince Mucci; VP/ General Manager - Chuck Satterlee	Head coach: Head Coach - Mike Oliver; Offensive coaches: Offensive coordinator – Mike Oliver; Defensive coaches: Defensive coordinator – Noel Soto; Assistant Defensive Coordinator - Dennison Robinson; Defensive line – Ryan Lambert
