= 2014 Marion Blue Racers season =

- Owner: LaMonte and Shavonne Coleman
- General manager: LaMonte Coleman
- Head coach: Marc Huddleston (fired March 6: 3-1 record); LaMonte Coleman (interim)
- Home stadium: Veterans Memorial Coliseum; 220 East Fairground Street; Marion, OH 43302

Results
- Record: 8–2
- Division place: 1st
- Playoffs: Won South Division Championship (River Monsters) 56-40; Lost CIFL Championship Game (Explosion) 26–38

The 2014 Marion Blue Racers season was the fourth season for the Continental Indoor Football League (CIFL) franchise.

In May 2013, the Blue Racers announced that they were leaving the CIFL again, this time to join the Xtreme Indoor Football League. The league was supposed to be run by Blue Racers owner LaMonte Coleman. However, in August 2013, the Blue Racers re-signed with the CIFL to a multi-year contract. Coleman has hired Marc Huddleston as the 2014 Head Coach and Director of Football Operations. After a 5–1 start, the Blue Racers announced that Coleman would be taking over as the team's head coach. The Blue Racers recovered from a down season in 2013, by winning the CIFL's new South Division title, clinching them home-field advantage in the South Division playoffs. The Blue Racers faced off against the Northern Kentucky River Monsters in the South Division title game and won 56–40. With the win over Northern Kentucky, the Blue Racers clinched their second berth in the CIFL Championship Game. After three quarters of play, the Blue Racers were tied at 26 with the Erie Explosion in the 2014 CIFL Championship Game when Aaron Smentanka found Evan Twombly for a score. After Marion turned over the ball on downs, Richard Stokes scored again for the Explosion, which turned out to be the final score of the game, making the score 38–26.

== Roster ==
2014 Marion Blue Racers roster
Quarterbacks: 9 Chris Wallace; Offensive backs: 22 Chris Brooks; Wide receivers: 80 Gerald Byrd; 33 Seth Steven; 1 Mike Tatum	Offensive linemen: -- Bobby Gay; -- J. T. Haynes; 75 Robert Price; 77 Kris Stafford; Defensive linemen: 99 Mike Cross; 88 Will Haase; 11 Thomas McKenzie; 55 Joshua Montgomery	Linebackers: 27 Gaines Burnett; 28 Korrion Wade; Defensive backs: 7 Dante Barnes; -- Chris Crayton; 21 Bryceson Lawrence; 4 E. J. Underwood; 25 Steve Witherspoon; -- Chad Woodfork; Kickers: 34 Josh Berkshire	Injured reserve: currently vacant; Exempt list: currently vacant; Practice squad: currently vacant; rookies in italics; Roster updated April 5, 2014; 22 Active, 0 Inactive, 0 PS

== Schedule ==
=== Regular season ===
Week	Date	Kickoff	Opponent	Results		Game site
Week	Date	Kickoff	Opponent	Final score	Team record	Game site
1	Bye					
2	February 9	4:00 P.M. EST	Kentucky Xtreme	W 69-13	1-0	Veterans Memorial Coliseum
3	February 16	2:00 P.M. EST	at Erie Explosion	L 23-43	1-1	Erie Insurance Arena
4	February 23	4:00 P.M. EST	Dayton Sharks	W 50-41	2-1	Veterans Memorial Coliseum
5	March 2	4:00 P.M. EST	Northern Kentucky River Monsters	W 27-20	3-1	Veterans Memorial Coliseum
6	March 9	4:00 P.M. EST	Erie Explosion	W 22-21	4-1	Veterans Memorial Coliseum
7	Bye					
8	March 21	7:30 p.m. EST	at Bluegrass Warhorses	W 52-28	5-1	Alltech Arena
9	Bye					
10	April 5	7:30 P.M. EST	at Dayton Sharks	W 46-36	6-1	Hara Arena
11	April 12	7:30 p.m. EST	at Saginaw Sting	L 25-28	6-2	Dow Event Center
12	April 19	4:00 p.m. EST	at Detroit Thunder	W 2-0 (Forfeit)	7-2	Fraser Hockeyland
13	April 27	4:00 p.m. EST	Columbus War Eagles*	W 61-2	8-2	Veterans Memorial Coliseum
14	Bye					

*The Columbus War Eagles played a fill in game for the Port Huron Patriots, who forfeited the final 3 games of the season.

=== Standings ===
2014 Continental Indoor Football League
Team	Overall				Division			
Team	W	L	T	PCT	W	L	T	PCT
North Division
y-Saginaw Sting	9	1	0	.900	6	1	0	.857
x-Erie Explosion	8	2	0	.800	5	1	0	.833
Chicago Blitz	7	3	0	.700	4	2	0	.667
z-Port Huron Patriots	1	8	0	.111	1	6	0	.143
z-Detroit Thunder	0	8	0	.000	0	6	0	.000
South Division
y-Marion Blue Racers	8	2	0	.800	6	0	0	1.000
x-Northern Kentucky River Monsters	7	3	0	.700	5	2	0	.714
Dayton Sharks	6	4	0	.600	4	3	0	.571
z-Bluegrass Warhorses	1	7	0	.125	1	5	0	.167
z-Kentucky Xtreme	0	5	0	.000	0	4	0	.000

- y - clinched division title
- x - clinched playoff spot
- z - ceased operations during season

== Postseason ==
Week	Date	Kickoff	Opponent	Results		Game site
Week	Date	Kickoff	Opponent	Final score	Team record	Game site
South Division Championship	May 10	7:30 P.M. EST	Northern Kentucky River Monsters	W 56-40	1-0	Veterans Memorial Coliseum
2014 CIFL Championship Game	May 18	4:00 P.M. EST	Erie Explosion	L 26-38	1-1	Veterans Memorial Coliseum

== Coaching staff ==
2014 Marion Blue Racers staff
Front office: CEO/General Manager – LaMonte Coleman; CFO/Owner – Shavonne Coleman; Chief Marketing Officer– Ryan Sawyer; Lead designer – Justin Boyd; Event Manager - Kate Servick; Dance Director- Michelle Emmerson; Head coach: Director of Football Ops./Head Coach – Marc Huddleston; Offensive coaches: Offensive coordinator – Marc Huddleston; Running Backs - Open; Wide receivers – Marc Huddleston; Offensive line – Rick Butler; Intern Strength Coach- Devin Stover	Defensive coaches: Defensive coordinator – Robert Price; Defensive line – Robert Price; Secondary – Rich Stotts/Devin Stover; Special Teams- Rick Butler; Equipment Mgr.- Andy Cook
