= 2014 Dayton Sharks season =

American Indoor Foortball League season

- Owner: Corwyn Thomas
- General manager: Lavar Glover
- Head coach: Lavar Glover
- Home stadium: Hara Arena

Results
- Record: 6-4
- Division place: 3rd
- Playoffs: did not qualify

The 2014 Dayton Sharks season was the second season for the Continental Indoor Football League (CIFL) franchise.

In June 2013, the Sharks agreed to terms with the CIFL to return for the 2014 season.

== Roster ==
Dayton Sharks roster
Quarterbacks: 11 Evan Sawyer; Running backs: 5 Marcus Fails; Wide receivers: 8 Eugene Cooper; 18 Derrick Sheerer; 1 Jason Smith; 19 Craig Wallace Jr.	Offensive linemen: 56 Dimecus Brown; 91 Kory Chappell; 72 Josh Ellison; Defensive linemen: 3 James Cravens; 77 James Marks; 58 Kevin Moore; Linebackers: 19 Josh Copeland	Defensive backs: 9 Mychal Davis; 21 Donte Johnson; 10 Viterio Jones; 7 Demetrius McCray; 27 Kendric Reed; 37 Chris Respress; Kickers: 52 Zach VanZant	Injured reserve: currently vacant; Exempt list: 1 Robert Redd WR (Exempt); rookies in italics; Roster updated May 3, 2014; 20 Active, 1 Inactive

== Schedule ==
=== Regular season ===
Week	Date	Kickoff	Opponent	Results		Game site
Week	Date	Kickoff	Opponent	Final score	Team record	Game site
1	Bye					
2	February 8	7:30 P.M. EST	at Bluegrass Warhorses	W 43-29	1-0	Alltech Arena
3	February 15	7:30 P.M. EST	Detroit Thunder	W 45-18	2-0	Hara Arena
4	February 23	4:00 P.M. EST	at Marion Blue Racers	L 41-50	2-1	Veterans Memorial Coliseum
5	Bye					
6	March 9	4:00 P.M. EST	Kentucky Xtreme	W 51-21	3-1	Hara Arena
7	March 15	7:30 P.M. EST	at Northern Kentucky River Monsters	W 65-45	4-1	The Bank of Kentucky Center
8	March 23	7:00 p.m. EST	at Chicago Blitz	L 32-48	4-2	Intra Soccer
9	Bye					
10	April 5	7:30 P.M. EST	Marion Blue Racers	L 36-46	4-3	Hara Arena
11	Bye					
12	April 19	7:30 p.m. EST	Bluegrass Warhorses	W 76-6	5-3	Hara Arena
13	April 27	4:00 p.m. EST	at Kentucky Xtreme	W 2-0 (Forfeit)	6-3	Freedom Hall
14	May 3	7:30 P.M. EST	Northern Kentucky River Monsters	L 24-36	6-4	Hara Arena

=== Standings ===
2014 Continental Indoor Football League
Team	Overall				Division			
Team	W	L	T	PCT	W	L	T	PCT
North Division
y-Saginaw Sting	9	1	0	.900	6	1	0	.857
x-Erie Explosion	8	2	0	.800	5	1	0	.833
Chicago Blitz	7	3	0	.700	4	2	0	.667
z-Port Huron Patriots	1	8	0	.111	1	6	0	.143
z-Detroit Thunder	0	8	0	.000	0	6	0	.000
South Division
y-Marion Blue Racers	8	2	0	.800	6	0	0	1.000
x-Northern Kentucky River Monsters	7	3	0	.700	5	2	0	.714
Dayton Sharks	6	4	0	.600	4	3	0	.571
z-Bluegrass Warhorses	1	7	0	.125	1	5	0	.167
z-Kentucky Xtreme	0	5	0	.000	0	4	0	.000

- y - clinched division title
- x - clinched playoff spot
- z - ceased operations during season

== Coaching staff ==
2014 Dayton Sharks staff
Front office: Managing General Partner - Corwyn Thomas; Executive Vice President – Diana Thomas; General Manager - Lavar Glover; Chief Financial Officer - Mike McCormick; Legal Counsel - Brad Weber; Director of Media Relations - Alan See; Head coach: Head coach – Lavar Glover; Offensive coaches: Offensive coordinator – Tommy Jones; Defensive line – Derrick Shepard; Offensive Assistant - Thom Armstrong	Defensive coaches: Defensive Coordinator/Defensive Line - Lavar Glover; Defensive assistant – Lucius Dorise; Special Teams Coordinator / Offensive Line - Brian Wells
