= 2014 Erie Explosion season =

- Owner: Bill Stafford
- General manager: Shawn Liotta
- Head coach: Shawn Liotta
- Home stadium: Erie Insurance Arena

Results
- Record: 8-2
- Division place: 2nd
- Playoffs: Won North Division Championship (Sting) 46-15; Won CIFL Championship Game (Blue Racers) 38-26

The 2014 Erie Explosion season is the eighth season for the Continental Indoor Football League (CIFL) franchise.

In June 2013, the Explosion agreed to terms with the CIFL to return for the 2014 season.

The Explosion earned an 8–2 record during the 2014 regular season and won their second consecutive CIFL championship. It would be the league's last championship; the CIFL dissolved after the 2014 season. The Explosion will continue.

== Roster ==
2014 Erie Explosion roster
Quarterbacks: 10 Taylor Genuser; 3 Aaron Smetanka; Running backs: 7 Nate Burney; 13 Richard Stokes; Wide receivers: 10 Alfonso Hoggard; 17 Josh Mastromatto; 5 Travis Tarpley; 9 Evan Twombly	Offensive linemen: -- Ty Gieser; 55 Dave McQuiston; -- Brannon Pate; 51 Skylar Trimble; Defensive linemen: 43 Tim Green; 62 Bob Hammer; 50 DaJuan Smith; 12 Zach Williams	Linebackers: 24 Jon D'Angelo; 52 Stephen Johnson; Defensive backs: 20 David Castillo; 6 Maurice Jones; 1 Jayson Nickson; 42 DeQwan Young; Kickers: 14 Shon Rowser	Injured reserve: currently vacant; Exempt list: currently vacant; Practice squad: currently vacant; rookies in italics; Roster updated February 7, 2014; 23 Active, 0 Inactive, 0 PS

== Schedule ==
=== Regular season ===
Week	Date	Kickoff	Opponent	Results		Game site
Week	Date	Kickoff	Opponent	Final score	Team record	Game site
1	Bye					
2	February 9	2:00 P.M. EST	at Northern Kentucky River Monsters	W 42-30	1-0	The Bank of Kentucky Center
3	February 16	2:00 P.M. EST	Marion Blue Racers	W 43-23	2-0	Erie Insurance Arena
4	February 23	2:00 P.M. EST	Chicago Blitz	W 44-35	3-0	Erie Insurance Arena
5	March 2	4:00 P.M. EST	at Saginaw Sting	L 27-45	3-1	Dow Event Center
6	March 9	4:00 P.M. EST	at Marion Blue Racers	L 21-22	3-2	Veterans Memorial Coliseum
7	March 16	2:00 p.m. EST	Bluegrass Warhorses	W 82-12	4-2	Erie Insurance Arena
8	March 22	7:30 p.m. EST	at Port Huron Patriots	W 65-30	5-2	McMorran Arena
9	March 30	4:00 P.M. EST	at Detroit Thunder	W 2-0 (Forfeit)	6-2	Fraser Hockeyland
10	Bye					
11	April 13	2:00 P.M. EST	Port Huron Patriots	W 114-0	7-2	Erie Insurance Arena
12	Bye					
13	April 27	2:00 p.m. EST	ASI Panthers	W 66-13	8-2	Erie Insurance Arena
14	Bye					

Note that the April 27 contest was originally against the Detroit Thunder, but the team ceased operations prior to the end of the season and the ASI Panthers, an independent farm club to the Arena Football League's Philadelphia Soul, were used as a replacement team. The April 13 contest was actually played against the Erie Express, a local semi-professional squad, because of a mass resignation in the Port Huron Patriots organization (the Express players played in Patriots uniforms).

=== Standings ===
2014 Continental Indoor Football League
Team	Overall				Division			
Team	W	L	T	PCT	W	L	T	PCT
North Division
y-Saginaw Sting	9	1	0	.900	6	1	0	.857
x-Erie Explosion	8	2	0	.800	5	1	0	.833
Chicago Blitz	7	3	0	.700	4	2	0	.667
z-Port Huron Patriots	1	8	0	.111	1	6	0	.143
z-Detroit Thunder	0	8	0	.000	0	6	0	.000
South Division
y-Marion Blue Racers	8	2	0	.800	6	0	0	1.000
x-Northern Kentucky River Monsters	7	3	0	.700	5	2	0	.714
Dayton Sharks	6	4	0	.600	4	3	0	.571
z-Bluegrass Warhorses	1	7	0	.125	1	5	0	.167
z-Kentucky Xtreme	0	5	0	.000	0	4	0	.000

- y - clinched division title
- x - clinched playoff spot
- z - ceased operations during season

== Postseason ==
Week	Date	Kickoff	Opponent	Results		Game site
Week	Date	Kickoff	Opponent	Final score	Team record	Game site
North Division Championship	May 9	7:30 P.M. EST	at Erie Explosion	W 46-15	1-0	Dow Event Center
2014 CIFL Championship Game	May 18	4:00 P.M. EST	at Marion Blue Racers	W 38-26	2-0	Veterans Memorial Coliseum

== Coaching staff ==
2014 Erie Explosion staff
Front office: Director of operations – Bill Stafford; Director of Sales - Shawn Struble; Head coach/Director of Football Operations - Shawn Liotta; Head coach: Head coach – Shawn Liotta; Offensive coaches: Offensive coordinator – Shawn Liotta	Defensive coaches: Defensive coordinator/player personnel – Jeremy Liotta; Defensive backs – Sam Reynolds; Defensive Line Coach- Al MaCauley; Assistant coach- Kirk Rearick; Special teams coaches: Special Teams Coordinator - Ed Marin
