= 2014 Bluegrass Warhorses season =

Sports season

- Owner: JaQuar Sanders
- Head coach: Harry Lewis
- Home stadium: Alltech Arena

Results
- Record: 1–7
- Division place: 4th
- Playoffs: did not qualify

The 2014 Bluegrass Warhorses season is the first season for the Continental Indoor Football League (CIFL) franchise.

The franchise was first announced in May 2013. Owner Eric Taylor announced that the Warhorses would be playing at the Alltech Arena on the grounds of the Kentucky Horse Park. In July, it was announced the Warhorses would be a member of the Continental Indoor Football League. Harry Lewis was introduced in August as the team's first head coach. In March 2014, the team's financial troubles forced the cancellation of its last four home dates, and moved the league to try to arrange sufficient road dates to allow the team to complete the season.

== Roster ==
Bluegrass Warhorses roster
Quarterbacks: 3 Dan McNutt; 4 Elonzo Scott; Running backs: 30 Derrick Brown; 2 Kenna Watts; Wide receivers: 21 Ronyal Britton; 20 Ricardo Hinkle; 8 Tyler Ray	Offensive linemen: 73 Cody Grundle; 99 Ace Rios; 52 Jason Webb; Defensive linemen: 9 Ryan Seay; 49 David Southers; Linebackers: 30 Cory McDonald	Defensive backs: 17 Nick Kerney; 11 Jame Morris; 49 Terrance Neal; 32 John Patrick; Kickers: 31 Derrick Anderson	Injured reserve: currently vacant; Exempt list: currently vacant; Practice squad: currently vacant; rookies in italics; Roster updated April 19, 2014; 18 Active, 0 Inactive, 0 PS

== Schedule ==
=== Regular season ===
Week	Date	Kickoff	Opponent	Results		Game site
Week	Date	Kickoff	Opponent	Final score	Team record	Game site
1	February 3	7:30 p.m. EST	Northern Kentucky River Monsters	L 20–36	0–1	Alltech Arena
2	February 8	7:30 P.M. EST	Dayton Sharks	L 29–43	0–2	Alltech Arena
3	February 16	2:00 P.M. EST	at Northern Kentucky River Monsters	L 23–32	0–3	The Bank of Kentucky Center
4	Bye					
5	March 2	4:00 P.M. EST	at Kentucky Xtreme	W 2–0 (Forfeit)	1–3	Freedom Hall
6	Bye					
7	March 16	2:00 P.M. EST	at Erie Explosion	L 12–82	1–4	Erie Insurance Arena
8	March 21	7:30 p.m. EST	at Marion Blue Racers	L 28–52	1–5	Veterans Memorial Coliseum
9	Bye					
10	April 5	7:30 P.M. EST	Saginaw Sting	L 0–2 (Forfeit)	1–6	Alltech Arena
11	April 13 contest against the Detroit Thunder was mutually canceled					
12	April 19	7:30 p.m. EST	at Dayton Sharks	L 6–76	1–7	Hara Arena
13	Bye					
14	May 5 contest against the Kentucky Xtreme was mutually canceled					

=== Standings ===
2014 Continental Indoor Football League
Team	Overall				Division			
Team	W	L	T	PCT	W	L	T	PCT
North Division
y-Saginaw Sting	9	1	0	.900	6	1	0	.857
x-Erie Explosion	8	2	0	.800	5	1	0	.833
Chicago Blitz	7	3	0	.700	4	2	0	.667
z-Port Huron Patriots	1	8	0	.111	1	6	0	.143
z-Detroit Thunder	0	8	0	.000	0	6	0	.000
South Division
y-Marion Blue Racers	8	2	0	.800	6	0	0	1.000
x-Northern Kentucky River Monsters	7	3	0	.700	5	2	0	.714
Dayton Sharks	6	4	0	.600	4	3	0	.571
z-Bluegrass Warhorses	1	7	0	.125	1	5	0	.167
z-Kentucky Xtreme	0	5	0	.000	0	4	0	.000

- y - clinched division title
- x - clinched playoff spot
- z - ceased operations during season

== Coaching staff ==
2014 Bluegrass Warhorses staff
Front office: Owner – JaQuar Sanders; Ticket manager – Starr Williams; Sales – Bob Kozachik; Head Coach: Head coach – Harry Lewis	Offensive coaches: Offensive coordinator – Chad Spencer; Offensive line – Sylvester Peeples; Defensive coaches: Defensive coordinator – Jamal Naji; Defensive line – Sylvester Peeples; Secondary – J. T. Haskins
