= 2014 Detroit Thunder season =

- Owner: Terrence & Lawrence Foster
- General manager: Terrence Foster
- Head coach: Terrence Foster
- Home stadium: Perani Arena and Event Center

Results
- Record: 0-8
- Division place: 5th
- Playoffs: did not qualify

The 2014 Detroit Thunder season is the second season for the Continental Indoor Football League (CIFL) franchise.

In June 2013, the Thunder agreed to terms with the CIFL to return for the 2014 season. The team was originally supposed to play the season at Fraser Hockeyland but was unable to secure turf for the arena, forcing the team to move to the Perani Arena and Event Center in Flint, Michigan for the only home game the Thunder would play that season. The team attempted to return to Fraser Hockeyland for the rest of the season but ceased operations after being forced to forfeit a game against the eventual champion Erie Explosion because of continuing turf problems at the arena.

== Roster ==
2014 Detroit Thunder roster
Quarterbacks: 4 James King; Running backs: 25 David Hill; 6 Garrett Hoskins; Wide receivers: 3 Reggie Eubanks; 1 Daryl Frager; 9 Nathan Frike; 11 Tyrone Gordon	Offensive linemen: 66 Dion Howze; Defensive linemen: 55 Michael Booker; 56 Stephen Chester; 41 Arnold Staton; 58 Eric Summers	Linebackers: 40 Josh Denault; Defensive backs: 8 Shaun Gaddis; 2 James Harris; Kickers: 22 Musa Odeh; Unknown: 51 Keith Barbee; 19 David Smith	Injured reserve: currently vacant; Exempt list: currently vacant; Practice squad: currently vacant; rookies in italics; Roster updated February 20, 2014; 19 Active, 0 Inactive, 0 PS

== Schedule ==
=== Regular season ===
Week	Date	Kickoff	Opponent	Results		Game site
Week	Date	Kickoff	Opponent	Final score	Team record	Game site
1	Bye					
2	February 8	7:30 P.M. EST	at Port Huron Patriots	L 12-34	0-1	McMorran Arena
3	February 15	7:30 P.M. EST	at Dayton Sharks	L 18-45	0-2	Hara Arena
4	February 21	7:30 P.M. EST	Saginaw Sting	L 16-72	0-3	Perani Arena and Event Center (Flint, MI)
5	Bye					
6	March 9	7:00 p.m. EST	at Chicago Blitz	L 6-59	0-4	Intra Soccer (Elgin, IL)
7	Bye					
8	March 21	7:30 p.m. EST	Saginaw Sting	L 35-49	0-5	Dow Event Center
9	March 30	4:00 P.M. EST	Erie Explosion	L 0-2 (Forfeit)	0-6	Fraser Hockeyland
10	Bye					
11	April 13 contest against the Bluegrass Warhorses was mutually canceled					
12	April 19	4:00 P.M. EST	Marion Blue Racers	L 0-2 (Forfeit)	0-7	Detroit
13	April 27	2:00 p.m. EST	at Erie Explosion	L 13-66*	0-8	Erie Insurance Arena
14	May 4 contest against the Port Huron Pirates was mutually canceled					

- ASI Panthers played this game in the Detroit Thunder's stead.

=== Standings ===
2014 Continental Indoor Football League
Team	Overall				Division			
Team	W	L	T	PCT	W	L	T	PCT
North Division
y-Saginaw Sting	9	1	0	.900	6	1	0	.857
x-Erie Explosion	8	2	0	.800	5	1	0	.833
Chicago Blitz	7	3	0	.700	4	2	0	.667
z-Port Huron Patriots	1	8	0	.111	1	6	0	.143
z-Detroit Thunder	0	8	0	.000	0	6	0	.000
South Division
y-Marion Blue Racers	8	2	0	.800	6	0	0	1.000
x-Northern Kentucky River Monsters	7	3	0	.700	5	2	0	.714
Dayton Sharks	6	4	0	.600	4	3	0	.571
z-Bluegrass Warhorses	1	7	0	.125	1	5	0	.167
z-Kentucky Xtreme	0	5	0	.000	0	4	0	.000

- y - clinched division title
- x - clinched playoff spot
- z - ceased operations during season

== Coaching staff ==
2014 Detroit Thunder staff
Front office: Co-Owner/Marketing and Sales - Terrence Foster; Co-Owner – Lawrence Foster; General Manager - Mike Piasecki	Head coach: Head Coach - Terry Foster; Offensive coaches: Co-Offensive Coordinator – Lawrence Foster; Co-Offensive Coordinator – Rob Hunt; Offensive line – Danny Foster; Defensive coaches: Defensive coordinator – Terrence Foster; Defensive line – Danny Foster
