= 2014 Saginaw Sting season =

6th season of CIFL

- Owner: Stuart Schweigert, Rob Licht & Tom O'Brien
- General manager: Rob Licht
- Head coach: Fred Townsend (resigned on May 7; 9-1 record); James Perry II (interim)
- Home stadium: Dow Event Center; 303 Johnson Street; Saginaw, MI 78607

Results
- Record: 9-1
- Division place: 1st
- Playoffs: Lost North Division Championship 15-46 (Explosion)

The 2014 Saginaw Sting season was the sixth season for the Continental Indoor Football League (CIFL) franchise.

In June 2013, the Sting agreed to terms with the CIFL to return for the 2014 season. The Sting won their first eighth game of the season to advance to 8-0, but during that game the Sting lost quarterback A. J. McKenna to injury. The following week the team lost 2013 league MVP, C. J. Tarver to the Winnipeg Blue Bombers of the Canadian Football League (CFL). The loss of those two key players became noticeable when the Sting lost their final regular season game to finish 9-1. Just one day before the Sting's first playoff game, head coach Fred Townsead announced his resignation. Line Coach James Perry II was named the teams interim head coach. The Sting were upset in the first round of the playoffs, 46-15, by the same team that had defeated them in the previous year's championship, the Erie Explosion.

== Roster ==
2014 Saginaw Sting roster
Quarterbacks: 12 Sam Landry; Running backs: 20 DeShawn Hayes; Wide receivers: 8 A. J. Bradley; 1 Austin Coleman; 18 Daryl Gooden; 15 Justin Hemm; 11 Shaun Hladki; 2 D. J. Marchiando; 13 Justin Mott; 10 Reginald Overton	Offensive linemen: 64 Eric Brim; 69 Desmond Kenner; 66 Mike LeGrow; 71 Brad Saunders; 52 Ameer Townes; Defensive linemen: 5 Justin Barnes; 3 Dwight Hargrove; 37 Josh Hunt; 56 Daniel Jackson	Linebackers: 57 Michael Martin; 34 Spencer Smith; Defensive backs: 21 Al Backey; 13 Demarcus Copes; 9 Jamaal Hilber; 21 Jamar Hilber; 6 LaTreze Mushatt; Kickers: 28 Chris Kollias	Injured Reserve: 7 A. J. McKenna QB (IR); 9 Enrique Shaw LB (IR); Exempt List: 8 C. J. Tarver WR (Exempt); rookies in italics; Roster updated May 8, 2014; 27 Active, 2 Inactive

== Schedule ==
=== Regular season ===
Week	Date	Kickoff	Opponent	Results		Game site
Week	Date	Kickoff	Opponent	Final score	Team record	Game site
1	Bye					
2	February 9	7:00 P.M. EST	at Chicago Blitz	W 42-25	1-0	Intra Soccer (Elgin, IL)
3	February 16	4:00 P.M. EST	Port Huron Patriots	W 70-44	2-0	Dow Event Center
4	February 21	7:30 P.M. EST	at Detroit Thunder	W 72-16	3-0	Perani Arena and Event Center (Flint, MI)
5	March 2	4:00 P.M. EST	Erie Explosion	W 45-27	4-0	Dow Event Center
6	March 9	4:00 P.M. EST	at Port Huron Patriots	W 61-34	5-0	McMorran Arena
7	Bye					
8	March 21	7:30 p.m. EST	Detroit Thunder	W 49-35	6-0	Dow Event Center
9	Bye					
10	April 5	7:30 P.M. EST	at Bluegrass Warhorses	W 2-0 (Forfeit)	7-0	Alltech Arena
11	April 12	7:30 P.M. EST	Marion Blue Racers	W 28-25	8-0	Dow Event Center
12	April 19	4:00 p.m. EST	at Kentucky Xtreme	W 2-0 (Forfeit)	9-0	Freedom Hall
13	April 26	7:30 p.m. EST	Chicago Blitz	L 28-34	9-1	Dow Event Center
14	Bye					

=== Standings ===
2014 Continental Indoor Football League
Team	Overall				Division			
Team	W	L	T	PCT	W	L	T	PCT
North Division
y-Saginaw Sting	9	1	0	.900	6	1	0	.857
x-Erie Explosion	8	2	0	.800	5	1	0	.833
Chicago Blitz	7	3	0	.700	4	2	0	.667
z-Port Huron Patriots	1	8	0	.111	1	6	0	.143
z-Detroit Thunder	0	8	0	.000	0	6	0	.000
South Division
y-Marion Blue Racers	8	2	0	.800	6	0	0	1.000
x-Northern Kentucky River Monsters	7	3	0	.700	5	2	0	.714
Dayton Sharks	6	4	0	.600	4	3	0	.571
z-Bluegrass Warhorses	1	7	0	.125	1	5	0	.167
z-Kentucky Xtreme	0	5	0	.000	0	4	0	.000

- y - clinched division title
- x - clinched playoff spot
- z - ceased operations during season

== Postseason ==
Week	Date	Kickoff	Opponent	Results		Game site
Week	Date	Kickoff	Opponent	Final score	Team record	Game site
North Division Championship	May 9	7:30 P.M. EST	Erie Explosion	L 46-15	0-1	Dow Event Center

== Coaching staff ==
2014 Saginaw Sting staff
Front office: Co-Owner/General Manager – Robert Licht; Co-Owner/Director of Football Operations – Stuart Schweigert; Co-Owner/Director of Business Sales – James O'Brien; Assistant general manager – Bill Wheeler; Front Office Manager - Tyler Vienot; Head coach: Head Coach/Defensive Coordinator - James Perry II; Offensive coaches: Offensive Coordinator - A. J. McKenna; Offensive line – James Perry II	Defensive coaches: Defensive Coordinator - Enrique Shaw; Defensive line – James Perry II
