= Jared Lorenzen =

American football player (1981–2019)

- Lorenzen with the New York Giants in 2007

No. 22, 13
- Position: Quarterback

Personal information
- Born: February 14, 1981; Covington, Kentucky, U.S.
- Died: July 3, 2019 (aged 38); Fort Thomas, Kentucky, U.S.
- Listed height: 6 ft 4 in (1.93 m)
- Listed weight: 285 lb (129 kg)

Career information
- High school: Highlands (Fort Thomas)
- College: Kentucky (1999–2003)
- NFL draft: 2004: undrafted

Career history

Playing
- New York Giants (2004–2007); Indianapolis Colts (2008)*; Kentucky Horsemen (2009); Northern Kentucky River Monsters (2011); Owensboro Rage (2013); Northern Kentucky River Monsters (2014)
- * Offseason or practice squad member only

Operations
- Ultimate Indoor Football League (Commissioner) (2012)

Awards and highlights
- Super Bowl champion (XLII); Second-team All-SEC (2002); First-team All-UIFL (2011); UIFL MVP (2011)

Career NFL statistics
- Passing attempts: 8
- Passing completions: 4
- Completion percentage: 50.0%
- TD–INT: 0–0
- Passing yards: 28
- Passer rating: 58.3
- Stats at Pro Football Reference

Jared Raymond Lorenzen (February 14, 1981 – July 3, 2019) was an American professional football player who was a quarterback in the National Football League (NFL) for four seasons with the New York Giants. He played college football for the Kentucky Wildcats, receiving second-team All-SEC honors in 2002 and setting the school records for passing yards and passing touchdowns. Lorenzen was signed by the Giants as an undrafted free agent in 2004. At 285 lb (129 kg), Lorenzen was the heaviest quarterback to play in the NFL. He was nicknamed "Hefty Lefty" because of his weight and being left-handed.

Lorenzen spent his entire NFL career as a backup, although he was part of the Giants team that won Super Bowl XLII, his final game in the league. Following a preseason stint with the Indianapolis Colts, Lorenzen played indoor football for the AF2, Ultimate Indoor Football League (UIFL), and Continental Indoor Football League (CIFL) from 2009 to 2014. He also served as the commissioner of the UIFL in 2012.

Lorenzen struggled with his weight throughout most of his life, which was exacerbated following a leg injury that ended his playing career. Amid various health complications deriving from his weight, he died in 2019 at the age of 38.

== Early life ==
Lorenzen attended Highlands High School in Fort Thomas, Kentucky, and was a letterman in football, basketball, and baseball. In basketball, he was a three-year letterman and helped lead his team to Kentucky Sweet 16 appearances. As a junior, he passed for a Northern Kentucky-record 2,759 yards and 37 touchdowns in 13 games. As a senior in 1998, he completed 62 percent of his passes for 3,393 yards, 45 touchdowns and six interceptions. He also rushed for 904 yards (8.4 average per carry) and 15 TDs in leading Highlands to a 15–0 season and No.19 national ranking as a senior, earning him the Mr. Football Award. Five games into his senior season, Lorenzen committed to the University of Kentucky.

== College career ==
When Lorenzen arrived at the University of Kentucky, he redshirted as a true freshman. As a redshirt freshman, he was named the team's starting quarterback by Wildcats head coach Hal Mumme ahead of returning starter Dusty Bonner. The move caused Bonner to transfer. Lorenzen's career at Kentucky was marked by two head coaching changes; Mumme departed as an investigation into NCAA rules violations brought down his staff and resulted in the program being placed on probation with scholarship limitations. After Lorenzen helped lead the team to a 7–5 record in 2002, head coach Guy Morriss left to become the head coach at Baylor University and was replaced by Rich Brooks, who designed plays in which Lorenzen lined up as a receiver while Shane Boyd played quarterback. Despite all the turmoil, Lorenzen set school records in total offense, passing yards, and passing touchdowns, eclipsing many marks set by 1999 NFL No. 1 overall draft pick Tim Couch.

=== College statistics ===
Year	Team	Games		Passing							Rushing			Receiving		
Year	Team	GS	GP	Cmp	Att	Pct	Yds	TD	Int	Rtg	Att	Yds	TD	Rec	Yds	TD
2000	Kentucky	11	11	321	559	57.4	3,687	19	21	116.5	76	140	5	0	0	0
2001	Kentucky	6	8	167	292	57.2	2,179	19	7	136.6	54	119	2	1	-13	0
2002	Kentucky	12	12	183	327	56.0	2,267	24	5	135.4	60	-51	0	0	0	0
2003	Kentucky	12	12	191	336	56.8	2,221	16	8	123.3	89	75	5	1	-11	0
Totals		41	43	862	1,514	56.9	10,354	78	41	126.0	279	283	12	2	-24	0

== Professional career ==
Pre-draft measurables
Height	Weight	Arm length	Hand span
6 ft 3 1/4 in (1.91 m)	288 lb (131 kg)	31 1/4 in (0.79 m)	10 1/8 in (0.26 m)
All values from NFL Combine

=== New York Giants ===
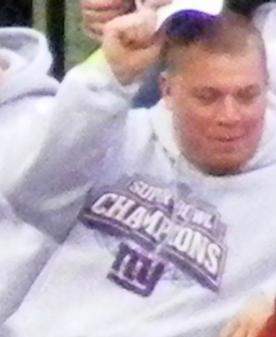
Lorenzen at the Giants Super Bowl rally

Lorenzen was not selected in the 2004 NFL draft and signed as an undrafted free agent with the New York Giants. He declined an offer by coach Tom Coughlin to play in NFL Europe in 2005. Lorenzen was the third-string quarterback for 2004 and 2005 for the Giants, behind starter Eli Manning and backup Tim Hasselbeck.

In the 2006 preseason, Lorenzen led his team to victory by engineering a game-winning drive against the Baltimore Ravens. Following that performance and an impressive training camp he was officially named the Giants' backup quarterback three weeks later.

Lorenzen made his first appearance in a game for the Giants on December 30, 2006, on a quarterback sneak to make a first down on a third-and-one. His second appearance came on Sunday, January 7, 2007, in the Giants' wild card loss against the Philadelphia Eagles; on the Giants' opening drive he lined up at quarterback on a third-and-one, and got the first down on the way to a Giants touchdown.

Lorenzen's first significant regular season appearance occurred on September 9, 2007, when he took over for the injured Manning in the fourth quarter of the season opener against the Dallas Cowboys. Lorenzen made both his first regular season pass and rush, but failed to earn a first down. He played again the following week, against the Green Bay Packers, completing three passes in five attempts for 21 yards. This proved to be his final appearance in the NFL, as Manning's injury did not cost him any further playing time and Lorenzen did not see further action in the 2007 season. He continued to serve as Manning's backup for the remainder of the season, which concluded with the Giants winning Super Bowl XLII against the then-undefeated New England Patriots and Lorenzen earning a championship ring.

After the team's Super Bowl win, Lorenzen was released by the Giants on June 23, 2008.

=== Indianapolis Colts ===
On July 24, 2008, Lorenzen was signed by the Indianapolis Colts. He played during the preseason, but was waived during the final cuts for the 53-man roster.

=== Kentucky Horsemen ===
On February 10, 2009, Lorenzen was assigned to the Kentucky Horsemen of the AF2 league. The team went bankrupt and was dissolved in October 2009.

=== Coaching ===
After the Horsemen folded, Lorenzen retired as a player. On March 23, 2010, he was hired as the quarterbacks coach at his alma mater, Highlands High School, in Fort Thomas, Kentucky.

=== Northern Kentucky River Monsters ===
In 2011, Lorenzen returned to professional football, this time working as the general manager of the Northern Kentucky River Monsters of the Ultimate Indoor Football League. Still wanting to compete on the field, Lorenzen resigned as GM to become the team's starting quarterback. Lorenzen had a highly successful season, throwing for 81 touchdowns and winning the league's MVP award.

After gaining some positive press for his return to football, Lorenzen was named commissioner of the league after the 2011 season.

=== Owensboro Rage ===
Still wanting to play, Lorenzen quit the UIFL's top job and signed with the Owensboro Rage of the Continental Indoor Football League partway through the 2013 season. The Rage folded two weeks prior to the end of the season due to lack of funds.

=== Return to the River Monsters ===
Lorenzen returned to the River Monsters, by this point a member of the Continental Indoor Football League, on December 17, 2013. In his first game of the season, he showed that he still had plenty of skill, side-stepping defenders. Lorenzen's play was filmed and the videos ended up all over the internet, overshadowing the River Monsters' 36–20 victory over the Bluegrass Warhorses. The following week, however, Lorenzen broke his tibia in a 42–30 loss to the Erie Explosion, ending his pro playing career.

== Post-football career ==
Lorenzen was a guest host of the Lexington-based radio show Kentucky Sports Radio, mainly during UK football season. In 2015, he started a T-shirt company, ThrowboyTees.

On July 28, 2017, Lorenzen launched "The Jared Lorenzen Project", where he chronicled online his attempts at fighting his obesity, weighing over 500 pounds (230 kg). By April 2018, Lorenzen had lost over 100 pounds (45 kg). His story was documented by ESPN in July 2018.

== Death ==
Lorenzen died on July 3, 2019, at age 38, from an acute infection, complicated by heart and kidney problems.

== See also ==
- Bruce Eugene

Preceded by Dennis Johnson	Kentucky Mr. Football; 1998	Succeeded by Travis Atwell
