= Shane Boyd =

American football player (born 1982)

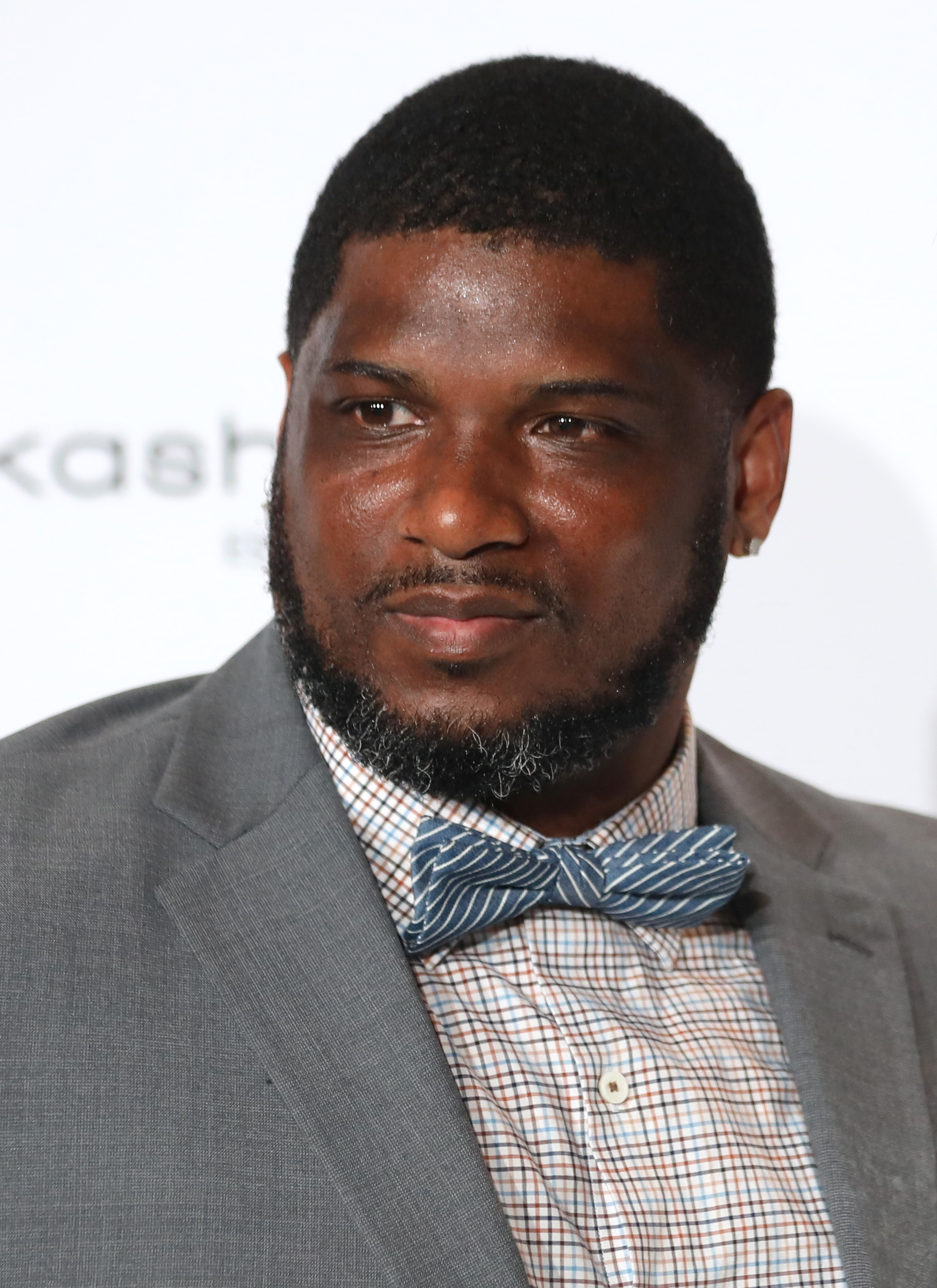
- Boyd in 2024

No. 7, 8, 9
- Position: Quarterback

Personal information
- Born: September 18, 1982 (age 44); Fort Huachuca, Arizona, U.S.
- Listed height: 6 ft 1 in (1.85 m)
- Listed weight: 232 lb (105 kg)

Career information
- High school: Henry Clay (Lexington, Kentucky)
- College: Kentucky (2000–2004)
- NFL draft: 2005: undrafted

Career history
- Tennessee Titans (2005)*; Pittsburgh Steelers (2006)*; → Cologne Centurions (2006); Arizona Cardinals (2006); Houston Texans (2007); Montreal Alouettes (2009)*; California Redwoods (2009); Indianapolis Colts (2009)*; Sacramento Mountain Lions (2010)*; Milwaukee Mustangs (2012); Tampa Bay Storm (2013); Portland Thunder (2014)*; Bluegrass Warhorses (2014); San Antonio Talons (2014); Arizona Rattlers (2015–2016); Cleveland Gladiators (2017); Baltimore Brigade (2017–2019)
- * Offseason or practice squad member only

Career AFL statistics
- Comp. / Att.: 543 / 919
- Passing yards: 6,460
- TD–INT: 117–35
- Passer rating: 96.57
- Rushing touchdowns: 8
- Stats at ArenaFan.com
- Stats at CFL.ca (archive)

Shane Anthony Boyd (born September 18, 1982) is an American former professional football quarterback who played in the Arena Football League (AFL), United Football League (UFL), and NFL Europe. He played college football for the Kentucky Wildcats, and signed with the Tennessee Titans of the National Football League (NFL) as an undrafted free agent in 2005. Boyd was on the active rosters of both the Arizona Cardinals and Houston Texans during his time in the NFL.

== Early life ==
Shane Anthony Boyd was born on September 18, 1982, in Fort Huachuca, Arizona. He played football and baseball at Henry Clay High School in Lexington, Kentucky. His brother, Aaron, was a wide receiver at Kentucky.

== College career ==
In college, Boyd played both baseball and football again. He was drafted as a pitcher by the Minnesota Twins the 12th round of the 2004 MLB draft but decided against signing. Boyd played in thirty-six football games at Kentucky, of which he started sixteen. He finished his college career with 2,484 passing yards, thirteen touchdown passes, 845 rushing yards and thirteen rushing touchdowns.

== Professional career ==
Boyd was rated the 50th best quarterback in the 2005 NFL draft by NFLDraftScout.com.

Pre-draft measurables
Height	Weight	40-yard dash	20-yard shuttle	Three-cone drill	Vertical jump	Broad jump
6 ft 0 5/8 in (1.84 m)	232 lb (105 kg)	4.70 s	4.50 s	7.02 s	33.5 in (0.85 m)	9 ft 7 in (2.92 m)
All values from Kentucky's Pro Day

=== Tennessee Titans ===
After going undrafted, Boyd was signed by the Tennessee Titans on April 29, 2005. He was later released on August 29.

=== Pittsburgh Steelers ===
Boyd signed with the Pittsburgh Steelers on February 16, 2006. The Steelers then allocated him to NFL Europe to play for the Cologne Centurions. He played in all ten games, starting four, for the Centurions during the 2006 NFL Europe season, completing 100 of 185 passes (54.1%) for 1,139 yards, five touchdowns, and 11 interceptions. Boyd also rushed 47 times for 339 yards, becoming NFL Europe's all-time leading rushing quarterback (breaking Jon Kitna’s record by five yards). Boyd was released by the Steelers on September 2, 2006.

=== Arizona Cardinals ===
On September 4, 2006, Boyd was signed to the practice squad of the Arizona Cardinals. On December 29, he was promoted to the active roster for the season finale. He was waived during final cuts on September 1, 2007.

=== Houston Texans ===
Boyd was signed to the Houston Texans' practice squad on October 24, 2007. He was promoted to the active roster on December 7. He was released on August 30, 2008.

=== Montreal Alouettes ===
Boyd was signed by the Montreal Alouettes on May 29, 2009. He was released at the beginning of training camp on June 6, 2009.

=== California Redwoods ===
Boyd was drafted by the California Redwoods of the United Football League (UFL) on June 18, 2009. He signed with the team on September 2, and scored the first ever UFL touchdown in the second quarter of the game on October 8. Boyd was the only one of the four starting quarterbacks in the UFL's first season to have never played a regular season NFL game. He played in five games, starting four, overall for the Redwoods during the 2009 UFL season, recording 75 completions on 124 attempts (60.5%) for 814 yards, three touchdowns, and five interceptions. Boyd also rushed 23 times for 110 yards and two touchdowns.

=== Indianapolis Colts ===
Boyd was signed to the Indianapolis Colts' practice squad on December 2, 2009, but was waived on December 8.

=== Sacramento Mountain Lions ===
Boyd returned to the Redwoods (by this point relocated and rebranded as the Sacramento Mountain Lions) for 2010, only to be cut in the preseason as the team signed Daunte Culpepper to serve as the team's new starter.

=== Milwaukee Mustangs ===
Boyd played for the Milwaukee Mustangs of the Arena Football League (AFL) in 2012.

=== Tampa Bay Storm ===
Boyd played for the AFL's Tampa Bay Storm in 2013.

=== Portland Thunder ===
On December 20, 2013, Boyd was selected by the Portland Thunder in the 2014 AFL Expansion Draft.

=== Bluegrass Warhorses ===
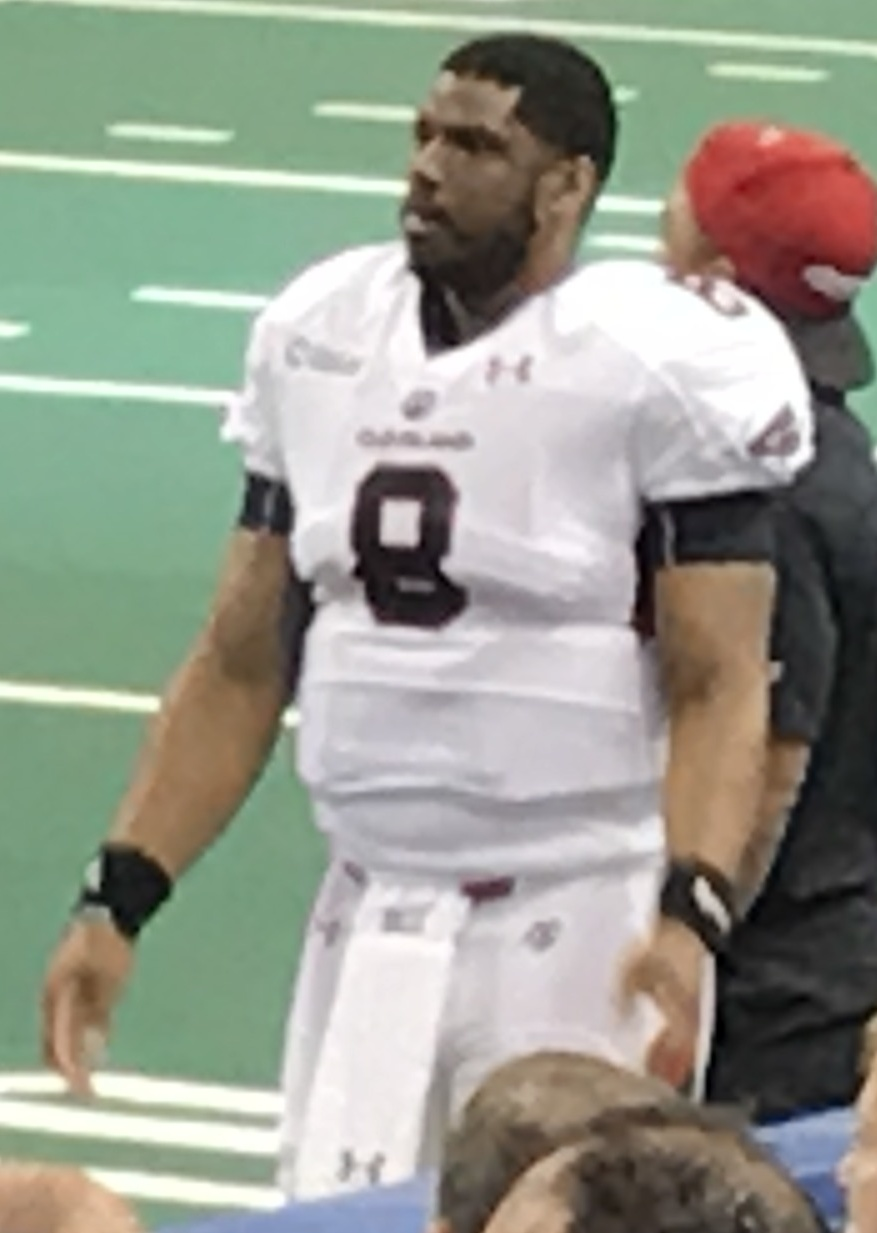
Boyd (#8) with the Cleveland Gladiators in 2017

Boyd left the AFL and joined the Bluegrass Warhorses of the Continental Indoor Football League (CIFL) for the 2014 season. He was released after three games.

=== San Antonio Talons ===
Boyd was assigned to the San Antonio Talons of the AFL on April 2, 2014.

=== Arizona Rattlers ===
Boyd was assigned to the AFL's Arizona Rattlers on April 30, 2015, after Rattlers' starting quarterback, Nick Davila, was placed on injured reserve.

=== Cleveland Gladiators ===
Boyd was assigned to the Cleveland Gladiators of the AFL on January 13, 2017. He started the team's first game of the season, completing 24 of 37 passes for 288 yards, five touchdowns and one interception in a 46–40 loss to the Tampa Bay Storm.

=== Baltimore Brigade ===
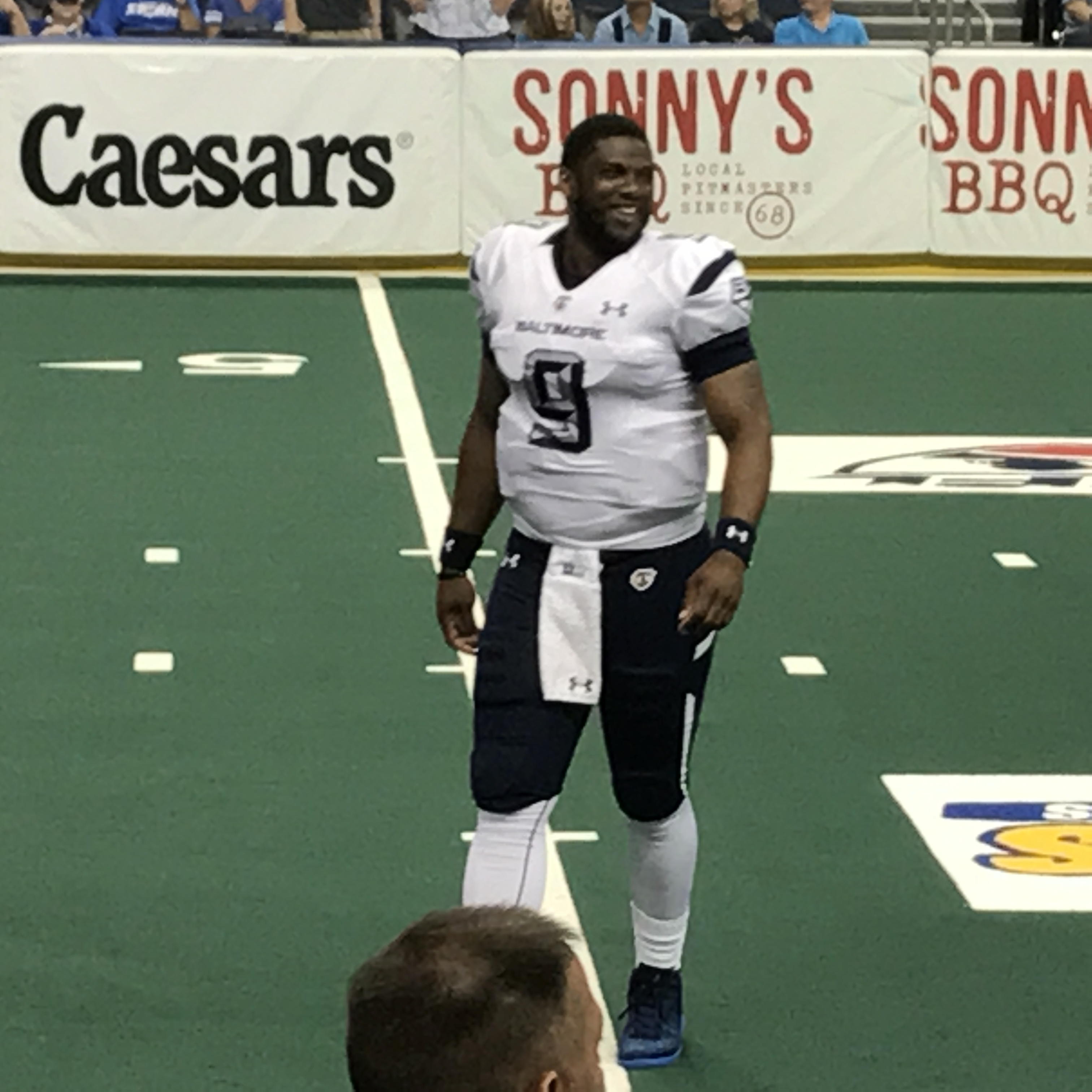
Boyd with the Baltimore Brigade in 2017

On May 22, 2017, Boyd and Brandon Thompkins were traded to the Baltimore Brigade for claim order positioning and future considerations. He started the team's final game of the regular season, completing 18 of 32 passes for 228 yards and four touchdowns in a 41–35 loss to the Washington Valor. He also started the team's playoff game, completing 21 of 33 passes for 324 yards, seven touchdowns and one interception in a 69–54 loss to the Philadelphia Soul. He rushed for another touchdown.

Boyd was assigned to the Brigade for the 2018 season on March 20, 2018. He did not throw any passes in 2018; his only statistic being one assisted tackle. He was named the team's most inspirational player.

On April 1, 2019, Boyd was assigned to the Brigade again. He threw for a career-high 2,389 yards and 46 touchdowns during his final season of pro football.

== Career statistics ==
Legend
	Led the league
**Bold**	Career high

=== AFL ===
Year	Team	Passing							Rushing		
Year	Team	Cmp	Att	Pct	Yds	TD	Int	Rtg	Att	Yds	TD
2012	Milwaukee	12	21	57.1	153	3	1	95.93	5	13	1
2013	Tampa Bay	34	54	63.0	401	6	1	105.56	5	5	2
2014	San Antonio	168	310	54.2	2,295	38	**23**	77.82	**19**	**36**	**2**
2015	Arizona	37	65	56.9	424	9	2	98.49	2	2	0
2016	Arizona	13	27	48.1	157	4	0	103.47	2	4	1
2017	Cleveland	24	37	**64.9**	288	5	1	**111.09**	3	-6	0
2017	Baltimore	31	53	58.5	353	6	2	91.16	3	10	0
2019	Baltimore	**224**	**352**	63.6	**2,389**	**46**	5	110.14	18	-6	**2**
Career		543	919	59.1	6,460	117	35	96.57	57	58	8

=== College ===
Year	Team	Passing								Rushing			
Year	Team	Cmp	Att	Pct	Yds	Y/A	TD	Int	Rtg	Att	Yds	Avg	TD
2001	Kentucky	85	154	55.2	852	5.5	4	6	102.4	32	156	4.9	3
2002	Kentucky	10	19	52.6	99	5.2	0	0	96.4	12	124	10.3	1
2003	Kentucky	15	43	34.9	205	4.8	2	2	81.0	45	268	6.0	4
2004	Kentucky	138	263	52.5	1,328	5.0	7	9	96.8	102	297	2.9	5
Career		248	479	51.8	2,484	5.2	13	17	97.2	191	845	4.4	13

== Personal life ==
Boyd is married to former WNBA player Mistie Bass.
