= Lavar Glover =

American gridiron football player, coach, and administrator (born 1978)

Profile
- Positions: Head coach, general manager

Personal information
- Born: December 17, 1978 (age 47); Dayton, Ohio, U.S.
- Listed height: 5 ft 10 in (1.78 m)
- Listed weight: 177 lb (80 kg)

Career information
- High school: Jefferson Township (Dayton)
- College: Cincinnati
- NFL draft: 2002: 7th round, 212th overall pick

Career history

Playing
- Pittsburgh Steelers (2002)*; Cincinnati Bengals (2002)*; Detroit Lions (2002)*; Cincinnati Bengals (2002); Orlando Predators (2004); Columbus Destroyers (2004); BC Lions (2006–2009); Winnipeg Blue Bombers (2010)
- * Offseason or practice squad member only

Coaching
- Dayton Sharks (2014)

Operations
- Dayton Sharks (2014) General manager

Awards and highlights
- Grey Cup champion (2006)

Career CFL statistics
- Tackles: 150
- Interceptions: 9
- Touchdowns: 2
- Fumble recoveries: 1
- Stats at CFL.ca (archived)

Career AFL statistics
- Tackles: 40
- Pass deflections: 3
- Interceptions: 2
- Stats at ArenaFan.com
- Stats at Pro Football Reference

Lavar Glover (born December 17, 1978) is an American former professional football defensive back. Most recently, Glover served as the head coach and general manager of the Dayton Sharks of the Continental Indoor Football League (CIFL). He went to the University of Cincinnati and was selected by the Pittsburgh Steelers in the seventh round of the 2002 NFL draft with the 212th overall pick. The Steelers released Glover and he was subsequently signed by the Cincinnati Bengals onto their practice squad. He played 2 games with the Bengals in 2002 and spent time with the Detroit Lions and Denver Broncos. In 2004, he played with the Columbus Destroyers and Orlando Predators of the Arena Football League (AFL). There, Glover had 2 interceptions, 40 tackles and 3 pass knockdowns. The BC Lions signed him as a free agent in 2006. Glover had 2 interceptions and 29 tackles as part of the 2006 Grey Cup champion Lions team.

On February 25, 2010, Glover was released by the BC Lions. On March 11, 2010, it was announced that Glover had been signed by the Winnipeg Blue Bombers.
