= 2014 Port Huron Patriots season =

- Owner: Jude Carter
- General manager: Jude Carter
- Head coach: Terry Foster (interim 0–1 record); Demar Cranford (fired on April 11; 1–6 record)
- Home stadium: McMorran Arena

Results
- Record: 1–8
- Division place: 4th
- Playoffs: Did not qualify

Uniform
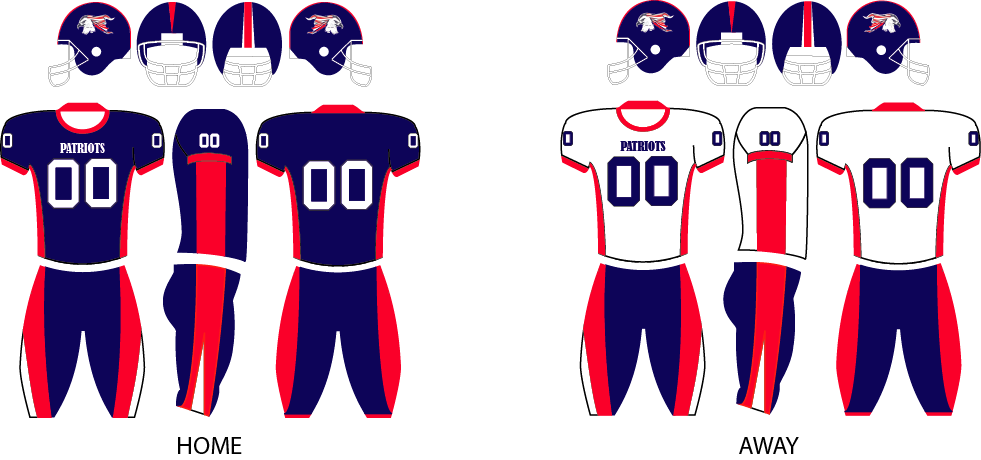

The 2014 Port Huron Patriots season was the third season for the Continental Indoor Football League (CIFL) franchise.

In June 2013, the Patriots agreed to terms with the CIFL to return for the 2014 season. On April 11, 2014, Jude Carter fired Head Coach Demar Cranford for "a lack of leadership and team performance."

== Roster ==
2014 Port Huron Patriots roster
Quarterbacks: 21 James Stallons; Running backs: 20 Adrien Brown; 23 A. J. Jimmerson; 22 Shawn Richardson; Wide receivers: 3 Donald Dotson; 87 Tarrence Tumpkin; 5 Jose Morris	Offensive linemen: 95 Mike Bratcher; 54 John Covington; 74 Mike Legrow; Defensive linemen: 99 Daniel Johnson; Linebackers: 59 Wesley Bryant; 2 Clifton Jackson; 9 Dimarco Scarber	Defensive backs: 25 Chris Frison; 24 Jeremy Gordon; 4 Michael McKinley; Kickers: 17 Logan Mitseff; Unknown position: 9 Dwayne Holmes; 21 Devin Bland; 25 Brandon Tucker; 54 John Covington; 99 Daniel Johnson	Injured reserve: currently vacant; Exempt list: currently vacant; rookies in italics; Roster updated April 5, 2014; 19 Active, 0 Inactive

== Schedule ==
=== Regular season ===
Week	Date	Kickoff	Opponent	Results		Game site
Week	Date	Kickoff	Opponent	Final score	Team record	Game site
1	Bye					
2	February 8	7:30 P.M. EST	Detroit Thunder	W 34–12	1–0	McMorran Arena
3	February 16	4:00 P.M. EST	at Saginaw Sting	L 44–70	1–1	Dow Event Center
4	Bye					
5	Bye					
6	March 9	4:00 P.M. EST	Saginaw Sting	L 34–61	1–2	McMorran Arena
7	March 16	5:00 p.m. EST	at Chicago Blitz	L 15–55	1–3	Odeum Expo Center
8	March 22	7:30 p.m. EST	Erie Explosion	L 30–65	1–4	McMorran Arena
9	March 29	7:30 P.M. EST	Northern Kentucky River Monsters	L 14–35	1–5	McMorran Arena
10	April 5	7:30 P.M. EST	Chicago Blitz	L 34–43	1–6	McMorran Arena
11	April 13	2:00 P.M. EST	at Erie Explosion	L 0–114	1–7	Erie Insurance Arena
12	Bye					
13	April 27	4:00 p.m. EST	at Marion Blue Racers	L 0–2 (Forfeit)	1–8	Veterans Memorial Coliseum
14	May 4 contest against the Detroit Thunder was mutually canceled					

=== Standings ===
2014 Continental Indoor Football League
Team	Overall				Division			
Team	W	L	T	PCT	W	L	T	PCT
North Division
y-Saginaw Sting	9	1	0	.900	6	1	0	.857
x-Erie Explosion	8	2	0	.800	5	1	0	.833
Chicago Blitz	7	3	0	.700	4	2	0	.667
z-Port Huron Patriots	1	8	0	.111	1	6	0	.143
z-Detroit Thunder	0	8	0	.000	0	6	0	.000
South Division
y-Marion Blue Racers	8	2	0	.800	6	0	0	1.000
x-Northern Kentucky River Monsters	7	3	0	.700	5	2	0	.714
Dayton Sharks	6	4	0	.600	4	3	0	.571
z-Bluegrass Warhorses	1	7	0	.125	1	5	0	.167
z-Kentucky Xtreme	0	5	0	.000	0	4	0	.000

- y - clinched division title
- x - clinched playoff spot
- z - ceased operations during season

== Coaching staff ==
2014 Port Huron Patriots staff
Front office: Co-Owner/General Manager – Jude Carter; Co-Owner – Lonnie Nichols; Co-Owner – Lance Nichols; Co-Owner – David Nichols; Co-Owner – Larry Page; Co-Owner – Matt Wuchte; Co-Owner – Nick Kennedy-Saura; Game Day Coordinator - Lori Jones; Head coach: Head coach – Demar Cranford; Offensive coaches: Offensive line/offensive coordinator – Darrel Rich	Defensive coaches: Defensive coordinator – Larry Page; Defensive Line/Asst. Defensive Coordinator – Darrel Rich; Special teams coaches: Special Teams Coordinator -
