= Alltech Arena =

Sports venue in Lexington, Kentucky, United States of America

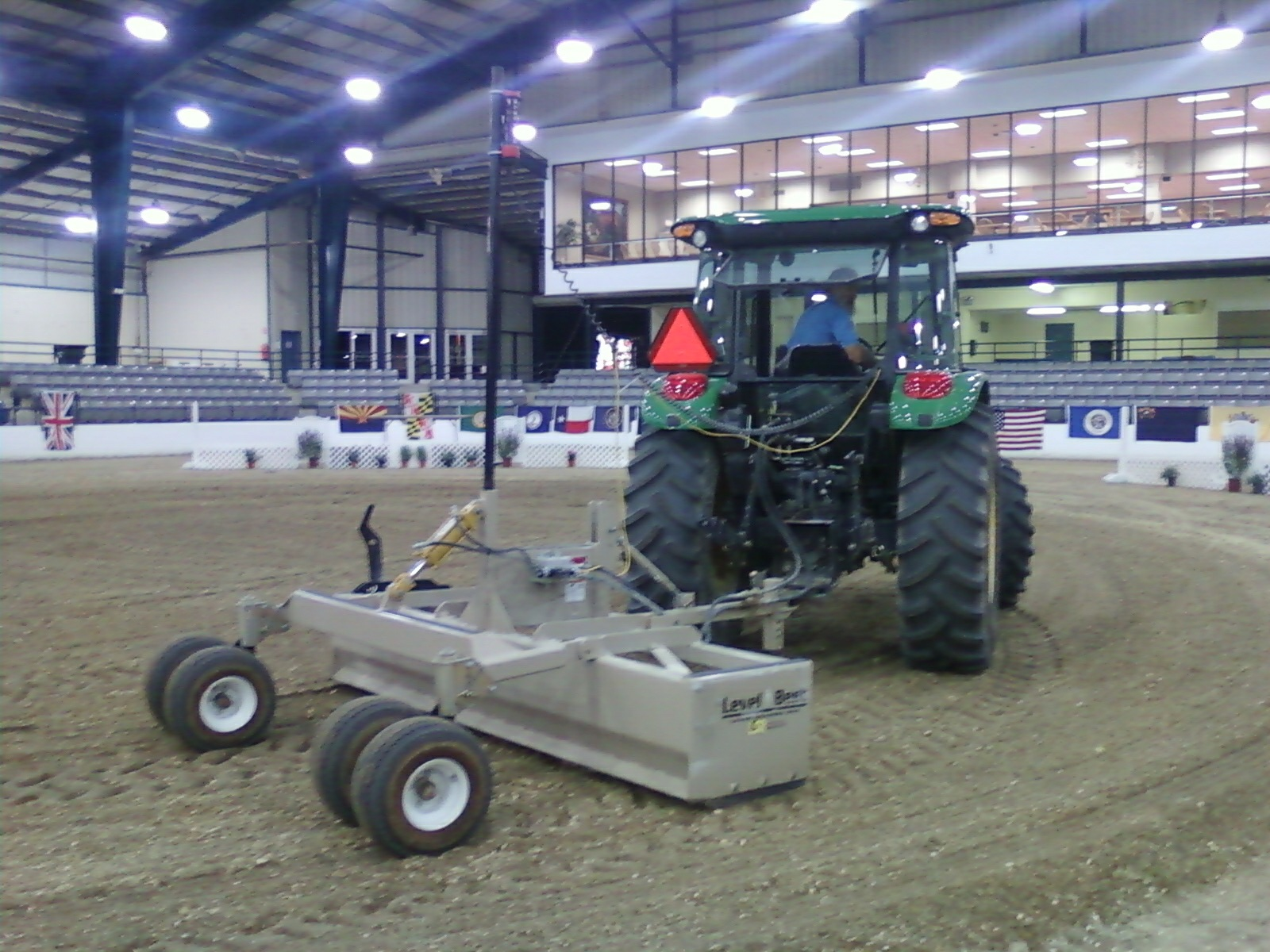
- Interactive map of Alltech Arena
- Location: 4089 Iron Works Parkway, Lexington, KY 40511
- Coordinates: 38.1579°N 84.5233°W
- Owner: Commonwealth of Kentucky
- Operator: Kentucky Horse Park
- Capacity: 5,517 (General stadium Capacity); 8,833 (Concerts)
- Surface: Multi-surface

Construction
- Opened: July 2009
- Cost: $40 million ($54 million in 2025 dollars)
- Architect: GBBN Architects
- General contractor: D.W. Wilburn

Tenants
- Bluegrass Warhorses (CIFL) (2014); KHSAA State High School Wrestling Tournament (KHSAA) (2012–present)

The Alltech Arena is a 5,517-seat multi-purpose arena in Lexington, Kentucky. The facility, named for the title sponsor Alltech, opened on the grounds of the Kentucky Horse Park in July 2009. It was originally constructed for the 2010 FEI World Equestrian Games.

The arena is owned by the Commonwealth of Kentucky and is managed by the Kentucky Horse Park. The arena is currently home to KHSAA State Wrestling Tournament, the Alltech National Horse Show, and numerous equestrian related events.

== Sports ==
The arena was the home of the Bluegrass Warhorses of the Continental Indoor Football League during the team's only season in 2014.
