= Jared McGriff-Culver =

American football player (born 1989)

No. 20
- Position: Fullback

Personal information
- Born: November 30, 1989 (age 36)
- Listed height: 6 ft 0 in (1.83 m)
- Listed weight: 265 lb (120 kg)

Career information
- High school: Downers Grove (IL) South
- College: Missouri
- NFL draft: 2013: undrafted

Career history
- Oakland Raiders (2013)*; Chicago Blitz (2014); Jacksonville Sharks (2014)
- * Offseason or practice squad member only

Career AFL statistics
- Rushing attempts: 65
- Rushing yards: 181
- Rushing touchdowns: 12
- Receiving yards: 52
- Receiving touchdowns: 2
- Stats at ArenaFan.com

Jared McGriff-Culver (born November 30, 1989) is an American former football fullback. He played college football at Missouri where he was a running back. He was signed as an undrafted free agent by the Oakland Raiders in 2013.

== Professional career ==
=== Oakland Raiders ===
After going undrafted during the 2013 NFL draft, McGriff-Culver was signed by the Oakland Raiders.

=== Chicago Blitz ===
After failing to catch on elsewhere in the NFL, McGriff-Culver signed with the Chicago Blitz of the Continental Indoor Football League (CIFL), where he played as a defensive end. After a single game with the Blitz, he left the team to pursue a different opportunity.

=== Jacksonville Sharks ===
On February 18, 2014, McGriff-Culver was assigned to the Jacksonville Sharks of the Arena Football League (AFL). The move to the AFL also gave McGriff-Culver the chance to be a running back again. He was placed on reassignment by the Sharks on March 17, 2015.
