= Northern Kentucky River Monsters =

Professional indoor football team based in Highland Heights, Kentucky

Logo

General information
- Founded: 2010
- Folded: 2014
- Headquartered: The Bank of Kentucky Center in Highland Heights, Kentucky
- Colors: Green, Black, White

Personnel
- Owner: Jill Chitwood
- General manager: John Jackson
- Head coach: Rodney Swanigan (2011); Brian Schmidt (2014); Mike Goodpaster (2014)

Team history
- Northern Kentucky River Monsters (2011, 2014)

Home fields
- The Bank of Kentucky Center (2011, 2014)

League / conference affiliations
- Ultimate Indoor Football League (2011) Continental Indoor Football League (2014): South Division (2014)

Playoff appearances (2)
- 2011, 2014

The Northern Kentucky River Monsters were a professional indoor football team based in Highland Heights, Kentucky. The River Monsters began play as a charter member of the Ultimate Indoor Football League (UIFL) for its inaugural 2011 season spending one season in the UIFL before reaching an agreement with league management to leave. After a two-year hiatus, the River Monsters returned in 2014 as a member of the South Division of the Continental Indoor Football League (CIFL). The River Monsters played their home games at The Bank of Kentucky Center. On June 6, 2011, it was announced that the UIFL and the River Monsters mutually agreed to part ways, leaving the team free to join another league. However, the UIFL had a lease agreement with the arena, which hampered the likelihood the River Monsters would play in Highland Heights in 2012. The team had been mentioned as a charter member Stadius Football Association in 2012, but that league never got off the ground. The team suspended operations on October 1, 2014.

== History ==
=== 2011 ===
Announced as startup team for the newly formed Ultimate Indoor Football League in 2010, the team was purchased by Jill Chitwood from the UIFL in February 2011. The River Monsters were the first professional sports team to play in northern Kentucky in over 90 years, after the Covington Blue Sox folded after a single season in 1913. Just a week before the season began, team general manager, Jared Lorenzen, relieved himself of his duties as general manager, and became the quarterback for the franchise. In the River Monsters first ever game they defeated the Canton Cougars by a score of 63–41. With a week 9 win over the Saginaw Sting, the River Monsters had clinched a postseason berth in their first season, clinching home field advantage throughout the playoffs. After wrapping up the season, the UIFL had discovered that the River Monsters had been paying their players over the league's salary cap. The UIFL stripped the River Monsters of the #1 seed and made them the #4 seed, taking away the River Monster's chance to earn playoff money. The River Monster now traveled to Saginaw, Michigan to play the Sting, where the Sting upset the River Monsters 48–47. On June 6, 2011, it was announced that the UIFL and the River Monsters mutually agreed to part ways, leaving the team free to join another league. However, the UIFL had a lease agreement with the arena (establishing a paper franchise named the Kentucky Monsters to hold onto the lease) and signed Lorenzen as their commissioner, which hampered the likelihood the River Monsters would play in Highland Heights in 2012. The team had been mentioned as a charter member Stadius Football Association, but that league never got off the ground. On their web show, the Dayton Silverbacks announced the River Monsters would be joining the Continental Indoor Football League (CIFL), moving to Muncie, Indiana, and retaining the River Monsters name. A September 2011 article on OurSportsCentral.com also said that former ownership of the Northern Kentucky River Monsters were joining the CIFL and moving to Muncie for the 2012 season. However, the team never played a game in Muncie.

=== 2014 ===
After a two-year layoff, the River Monsters announced that they would be returning to an active team, joining the CIFL for the 2014 season. In the River Monsters' first game of the season, listed as 320 pounds, Jared Lorenzen showed that he still had plenty of athleticism. Lorenzen's play was filmed and the videos ended up all over the internet, overshadowing the River Monsters' 36–20 victory of the Bluegrass Warhorses. Head coach Brian Schmidt was fired on February 22, and was replaced by defensive coordinator Mike Goodpaster. Goodpaster was able to salvage the season after losing Lorenzen to injury in week 2, going 5–2 down the stretch, defeating the Dayton Sharks the final week of the season to clinch the final South Division playoff spot.

On October 1, 2014, the team announced that they were suspending operations effective immediately.

== Notable players ==
=== Awards and honors ===
The following is a list of all Northern Kentucky River Monsters players who won league awards

| Season | Player | Position | Award |
|---|---|---|---|
| 2011 | Thomas McKenzie | DL | UIFL Defensive Player of the Year |
| 2011 | Jared Lorenzen | QB | UIFL MVP |

=== All-league players ===
The following River Monsters players were named to all-league teams:

- QB Jared Lorenzen (1)
- RB Maurice Douse (1)
- WR Ricardo Lenhart (2), Willie Idlette (1), Harry Lewis (1)
- OL Khalil El-Amin (1), Matt Rahn (1), George Frisch (1), Frank Straub (1)
- DL Thomas McKenzie (1), D'arrel Brown (1), Luke Scarbough (1)
- LB Jon D'Angelo (1), Santino Turnbow (1), David James (1)
- DB David Jones (1), Tez Morris (1), Tommy Harris (1), Ahoma Maxwell (1)
- K Dustin Zink (2)
- KR Maurice Douse (1)

== Head coaches ==
| Name | Term | Regular season | | | | Playoffs | | Awards |
| Name | Term | W | L | T | Win% | W | L | Awards |
|---|---|---|---|---|---|---|---|---|
| Rodney Swanigan | 2011 | 11 | 3 | 0 | .786 | 0 | 1 | |
| Brian Schmidt | 2014 | 2 | 1 | 0 | .667 | 0 | 0 | |
| Mike Goodpaster | 2014 | 5 | 2 | 0 | .714 | 0 | 1 | |

== Season-by-season results ==
| League champions | Conference champions | Division champions | Wild card berth | League leader |

| Season | Team | League | Conference | Division | Regular season | | | | Postseason results |
| Season | Team | League | Conference | Division | Finish | Wins | Losses | Ties | Postseason results |
|---|---|---|---|---|---|---|---|---|---|
| 2011 | 2011 | UIFL | | | 1st | 11 | 3 | 0 | Lost UIFL semifinals (Sting) 47–48 |
| 2014 | 2014 | CIFL | | South | 2nd | 7 | 3 | 0 | Lost South Division Championship (Blue Racers) 40–56 |
| Totals | | | | | | 18 | 6 | 0 | All-time regular season record (2011–2014) |
| Totals | | | | | | 0 | 2 | - | All-time postseason record (2011–2014) |
| Totals | | | | | | 18 | 8 | 0 | All-time regular season and postseason record (2011–2014) |
