= Julian Williams (American football) =

American football player (born 1990)

No. 1, 10, 16
- Position: Wide receiver

Personal information
- Born: March 23, 1990 (age 36)
- Listed height: 6 ft 1 in (1.85 m)
- Listed weight: 185 lb (84 kg)

Career information
- High school: Chicago Heights (IL) Marian Catholic
- College: Marian (IN) (2008–2011)
- NFL draft: 2012: undrafted

Career history
- Chicago Blitz (2014); Iowa Barnstormers (2014); Orlando Predators (2015)*; Iowa Barnstormers (2015); Orlando Predators (2015); Arizona Rattlers (2016)*; Chicago Eagles (2016)
- * Offseason or practice squad member only

Awards and highlights
- 2x First-Team All-MSFA (2010, 2011); Honorable Mention All-MSFA (2008)

Career AFL statistics
- Receptions: 84
- Receiving yards: 849
- Receiving TDs: 10
- Tackles: 7.5
- Kick return yards: 440
- Stats at ArenaFan.com

Julian Wililams (born March 23, 1990) is an American former football wide receiver. He played collegiately at Marian University in Indianapolis, Indiana.

== Professional career ==
=== Chicago Blitz ===
In February 2014, Williams signed with the Chicago Blitz of the Continental Indoor Football League (CIFL).

=== Iowa Barnstormers ===
On February 20, 2014, Williams was assigned to the Iowa Barnstormers of the Arena Football League (AFL).

=== Orlando Predators ===
Williams was assigned to the Orlando Predators on October 3, 2014. On March 22, 2015, Williams was placed on recallable reassignment.

=== Return to Iowa ===
On April 22, 2015, William returned to the Barnstormers. He was released on May 5, 2015.

=== Return to Orlando ===
On May 6, 2015, Williams was assigned to the Orlando Predators.

=== Arizona Rattlers ===
On February 23, 2016, Williams was assigned to the Arizona Rattlers.

=== Chicago Eagles ===
On April 7, 2016, Williams was assigned to Chicago Eagles.
