= Bluegrass Warhorses =

Logo

General information
- Founded: 2013
- Folded: 2014
- Headquartered: Alltech Arena in Lexington, Kentucky
- Colors: Blue, Red & White

Personnel
- Owner: JaQuar Sanders
- Head coach: Harry Lewis

Team history
- Bluegrass Warhorses (2014)

Home fields
- Alltech Arena (2014)

League / conference affiliations
- Continental Indoor Football League (2014): South Division (2014)

The Bluegrass Warhorses were a professional indoor American football team based in Lexington, Kentucky. The team joined the Continental Indoor Football League (CIFL) in 2014 as an expansion team. The Warhorses were the second indoor football team based in Lexington, after the Kentucky Horsemen of the United Indoor Football and af2. The owner of the Warhorses was JaQuar Sanders. The Warhorses played their home games at Alltech Arena inside of Kentucky Horse Park, but were forced to cancel their last four home games "due to unpaid arena rent and other bills" because the money was kept by the coach.

== Franchise history ==
=== 2014 ===
The franchise was first announced in May 2013 and that the Warhorses would be playing at Alltech Arena on the grounds of the Kentucky Horse Park. In July, it was announced the Warhorses would be a member of the Continental Indoor Football League. Harry Lewis was introduced in August as the team's first head coach. With former University of Kentucky quarterback, Shane Boyd leading the Warhorses, they fell to the Northern Kentucky River Monsters 36–20, in what became a viral game, due to Northern Kentucky's 320-pound quarterback, Jared Lorenzen. The team fell into financial problems halfway through the season, cancellation of their four remaining home dates, moving the league to seek new ownership for a possible 2015 season.

== Players of note ==
=== Final roster ===
Bluegrass Warhorses roster
Quarterbacks: 3 Dan McNutt; 4 Elonzo Scott; Running backs: 30 Derrick Brown; 2 Kenna Watts; Wide receivers: 21 Ronyal Britton; 20 Ricardo Hinkle; 8 Tyler Ray	Offensive linemen: 73 Cody Grundle; 99 Ace Rios; 52 Jason Webb; Defensive linemen: 9 Ryan Seay; 49 David Southers; Linebackers: 30 Cory McDonald	Defensive backs: 17 Nick Kerney; 11 Jame Morris; 49 Terrance Neal; 32 John Patrick; Kickers: 31 Derrick Anderson	Injured reserve: currently vacant; Exempt list: currently vacant; Practice squad: currently vacant; rookies in italics; Roster updated April 19, 2014; 18 Active, 0 Inactive, 0 PS

== Coaches of note ==
=== Head coaches ===
Note: Statistics are correct through Week 12 of the 2014 Continental Indoor Football League season.

Name	Term	Regular season				Playoffs		Awards
Name	Term	W	L	T	Win%	W	L	Awards
Harry Lewis	2014	1	7	0	.125	0	0	

=== Coaching staff ===
Bluegrass Warhorses staff
Front office: Owner/General Manager – JaQuar Sanders; Ticket manager – Starr Williams; Sales – Bob Kozachik; Head Coach: Head coach – Harry Lewis	Offensive coaches: Offensive coordinator – Chad Spencer; Offensive line – Sylvester Peeples; Defensive coaches: Defensive coordinator – Jamal Naji; Defensive line – Sylvester Peeples; Secondary – J. T. Haskins

== Season-by-season results ==
League champions	Conference champions	Division champions	Wild card berth	League leader

Season	Team	League	Conference	Division	Regular season				Postseason results
Season	Team	League	Conference	Division	Finish	Wins	Losses	Ties	Postseason results
2014	2014	CIFL		South	4th	1	7	0	
Totals						1	7	0	All-time regular season record (2014)
Totals						0	0	-	All-time postseason record (2014)
Totals						1	7	0	All-time regular season and postseason record (2014)
