= Shonn Bell =

American football player (born 1974)

No. 18, 82
- Position: Defensive lineman

Personal information
- Born: October 25, 1974 (age 52); Waynesboro, Virginia, U.S.
- Listed height: 6 ft 5 in (1.96 m)
- Listed weight: 257 lb (117 kg)

Career information
- High school: Stuarts Draft (Stuarts Draft, Virginia)
- College: Clinch Valley
- NFL draft: 1996: undrafted

Career history

Playing
- Houston Oilers (1996–1998)*; Scottish Claymores (1999); San Francisco 49ers (1999–2000); Chicago Bears (2000)*; Minnesota Vikings (2001)*; Cleveland Browns (2001)*; Quad City Steamwheelers (2006–2007); Fort Wayne Freedom (2008); Chicago Knights (2011); Bloomington Edge (2013); Chicago Blitz (2014)
- * Offseason or practice squad member only

Coaching
- Quad City Raiders (2012) Defensive coordinator

Awards and highlights
- Second-team All-CIFL (2014)

Career NFL statistics
- Games played: 2
- Stats at Pro Football Reference

Jamara Riashonn Bell (born October 25, 1974) is an American former professional football player who was a defensive lineman in the National Football League (NFL). He played college football for the Clinch Valley Highland Cavaliers.

== Early life ==
Bell was born in Waynesboro, Virginia. Bell played most of his high school football in Germany while his father was stationed there in the Army. His senior year of high school he was moved back to Virginia where he attended Stuarts Draft High School in Stuarts Draft, Virginia.

== College career ==
Upon his graduation, Bell only received attention from Clinch Valley College. Realizing it was his only opportunity, Bell accepted his scholarship to Clinch Valley. Bell finished his career with the Highland Cavaliers with 84 receptions for 1,224 yards and 16 touchdowns. He was an NAIA All-American tight end and All-Virginia tight end.

== Professional career ==
=== Quad City Steamwheelers ===
From 2006 to 2007, Bell played for the Quad City Steamwheelers of af2.

=== Fort Wayne Freedom ===
In 2008, Bell played with the Fort Wayne Freedom of the Continental Indoor Football League.

=== Bloomington Extreme ===
In 2010, Bell signed with the Bloomington Extreme of the Indoor Football League.

== Coaching career ==
Bell formally served as the defensive coordinator for the Quad City Raiders, a minor league football team in the MFA.

He was named the head football coach at Waynesboro High School on April 18, 2024.
