= Dayton Sharks =

American indoor football team

Logo

General information
- Founded: 2012
- Folded: 2014
- Headquartered: Hara Arena in Trotwood, Ohio
- Colors: Black, Blue, Silver
- Mascot: Shark

Personnel
- Owner: CA Sports Entertainment LLC. Group
- General manager: Lavar Glover
- Head coach: Chris Taylor (2013); Lavar Glover (2014)

Team history
- Dayton Sharks (2013–2014)

Home fields
- Hara Arena (2013-2014)

League / conference affiliations
- Continental Indoor Football League (2013–2014): South Division (2014)

Playoff appearances (1)
- 2013

The Dayton Sharks were a professional indoor football team based in Dayton, Ohio. The team was a member of the Continental Indoor Football League (CIFL). The franchise started as an expansion team in the CIFL during the 2013 season. The Sharks were the fifth indoor football team to be based in Dayton, the first being the Dayton Skyhawks of the original Indoor Football League. The Skyhawks were followed by the Dayton Warbirds, who later became the Dayton Bulldogs, of the National Indoor Football League the third being the Cincinnati Marshals who played their 2007 season in Dayton and the fourth being the Dayton Silverbacks who played from 2006 to 2012. The Owner of the Sharks was CA Sports Entertainment LLC. The Sharks played their home games at Hara Arena in nearby Trotwood, Ohio.

== Franchise history ==
=== 2013 play begins ===
In July 2012, the team announced CA Sports Entertainment LLC. was awarded an expansion franchise in Dayton, Ohio and that the team would be named the Dayton Sharks. The Sharks filled the void left after the Dayton Silverbacks folded at the conclusion of the 2012 season. The team was led by Corwyn Thomas, who was the team's Managing General Partner, CEO and Chairman. The team signed many local players, who have a track record for success, such at Tommy Jones and Robert Redd. The Sharks had a great start to the season, going 8−0 before losing to the Erie Explosion and the Kentucky Xtreme in the final two weeks. With an 8–2 record, the Sharks had won the 2 seed for the CIFL playoffs, but due to a scheduling conflict with Hara Arena, the Sharks played their playoff game at the Saginaw Sting. The Sting would go on to upset the Sharks, scoring twice in the final minute to defeat their former quarterback Jones.

=== 2014 ===
In June 2013, the Sharks agreed to terms with the CIFL to return for the 2014 season.

== Logos and uniforms ==
When the Dayton Sharks were announced, the ownership stated the franchise would be red, black and silver, but after a month changed the colors to be blue, black and silver. The team also introduced a new logo at that time, a Shark with the text "Sharks" underneath it.

First Proposed Dayton Sharks Logo

Second Proposed Dayton Sharks Logo

2013–2014 Logo

== Notable players ==
=== Awards and honors ===
The following is a list of all Dayton Sharks players who have won league Awards

| Season | Player | Position | Award |
|---|---|---|---|
| 2013 | Tommy Jones | QB | CIFL Offensive Player of the Year |

=== All-League players ===
The following Sharks players have been named to All-League Teams:

- QB Tommy Jones (2)
- RB Derrick Moss (1)
- WR Robert Redd (1), Kenyez Mincy (1), Eugene Cooper (1), Derrick Shearer (1)
- OL Andrew Phelan (1), Frank Straub (1), Josh Ellison (1)
- DL James Spikes (1)
- LB Santino Turnbow (1)
- DB Mike Davis (1), Viterio Jones (1), Donte Johnson (1)

== Notable coaches ==
=== Head coaches ===
| Name | Term | Regular season | | | | Playoffs | | Awards |
| Name | Term | W | L | T | Win% | W | L | Awards |
|---|---|---|---|---|---|---|---|---|
| Chris Taylor | 2013 | 8 | 2 | 0 | .800 | 0 | 1 | |
| Lavar Glover | 2014 | 6 | 4 | 0 | .600 | 0 | 0 | |

- Derrick Shepard (defensive lineman) – offensive line coach

== Season-by-season results ==
| League champions | Conference champions | Division champions | Wild card berth | League leader |

| Season | Team | League | Conference | Division | Regular season | | | | Postseason results |
| Season | Team | League | Conference | Division | Finish | Wins | Losses | Ties | Postseason results |
|---|---|---|---|---|---|---|---|---|---|
Dayton Sharks
| 2013 | 2013 | CIFL | | | 2nd | 8 | 2 | 0 | Lost CIFL Semifinals (Saginaw) 63-66 |
| 2014 | 2014 | CIFL | | South | 3rd | 6 | 4 | 0 | |
| Totals | | | | | | 14 | 6 | 0 | All-time regular season record (2013-2014) |
| Totals | | | | | | 0 | 1 | - | All-time postseason record (2013-2014) |
| Totals | | | | | | 14 | 7 | 0 | All-time regular season and postseason record (2013-2014) |

== Media ==
- Broadcasters: Radio - Lee W. Mowen, Doug Brown, Brian Reiss
- Local media: Radio - Gem City Sports Network
