= Aaron Smetanka =

American football coach (born 1988)

Current position
- Title: Head coach
- Team: Kiski School (PA)
- Record: 0–0

Biographical details
- Born: August 24, 1988 (age 38); Allison Park, Pennsylvania, U.S.

Playing career
- 2007–2009: Robert Morris
- 2010–2011: Saint Vincent
- 2013–2014: Erie Explosion
- Position: Quarterback

Coaching career (HC unless noted)
- 2012: Peters Township HS (PA) (QB)
- 2013–2015: Saint Vincent (QB)
- 2016: Chartiers Valley HS (PA) (QB)
- 2017–2018: Greensburg Central Catholic HS (PA)
- 2019–2024: Saint Vincent
- 2025–present: Kiski School (PA)

Head coaching record
- Overall: 19–36 (college); 10–10 (high school)
- Bowls: 0–1

Accomplishments and honors

Awards
- First Team All-PAC (2010); 2× CIFL champion (2013, 2014)

Aaron Smetanka (born August 24, 1988) is an American college football coach. He is the head football coach for The Kiski School, a position he has held since 2025. He was the head football coach for Greensburg Central Catholic High School from 2017 to 2018 and Saint Vincent College from 2019 to 2024. He also coached for Peters Township High School and Chartiers Valley High School. He played college football for Robert Morris and Saint Vincent before playing professionally for the Erie Explosion of the Continental Indoor Football League (CIFL) as a quarterback.

== Head coaching record ==
=== College ===
Year	Team	Overall	Conference	Standing	Bowl/playoffs
Saint Vincent Bearcats (Presidents' Athletic Conference) (2019–2024)
2019	Saint Vincent	3–7	3–6	T–7th	
2020–21	Saint Vincent	2–2	2–2	T–3rd	
2021	Saint Vincent	5–6	4–5	T–6th	L James Lynah Bowl
2022	Saint Vincent	5–5	5–3	T–4th	
2023	Saint Vincent	3–7	3–7	T–7th	
2024	Saint Vincent	1–9	1–9	T–9th	
Saint Vincent:		19–36	18–32		
Total:		19–36			

=== High school ===
Year	Team	Overall	Conference	Standing	Bowl/playoffs
Greensburg Central Catholic Centurions () (2017–2018)
2017	Greensburg Central Catholic	3–7	2–5	6th	
2018	Greensburg Central Catholic	7–3	3–3	4th	
Greensburg Central Catholic:		10–10	5–8		
Kiski School Cougars () (2025–present)
2025	Kiski School	0–0	0–0		
Kiski School:		0–0	0–0		
Total:		10–10			
