= Thomas McKenzie (American football) =

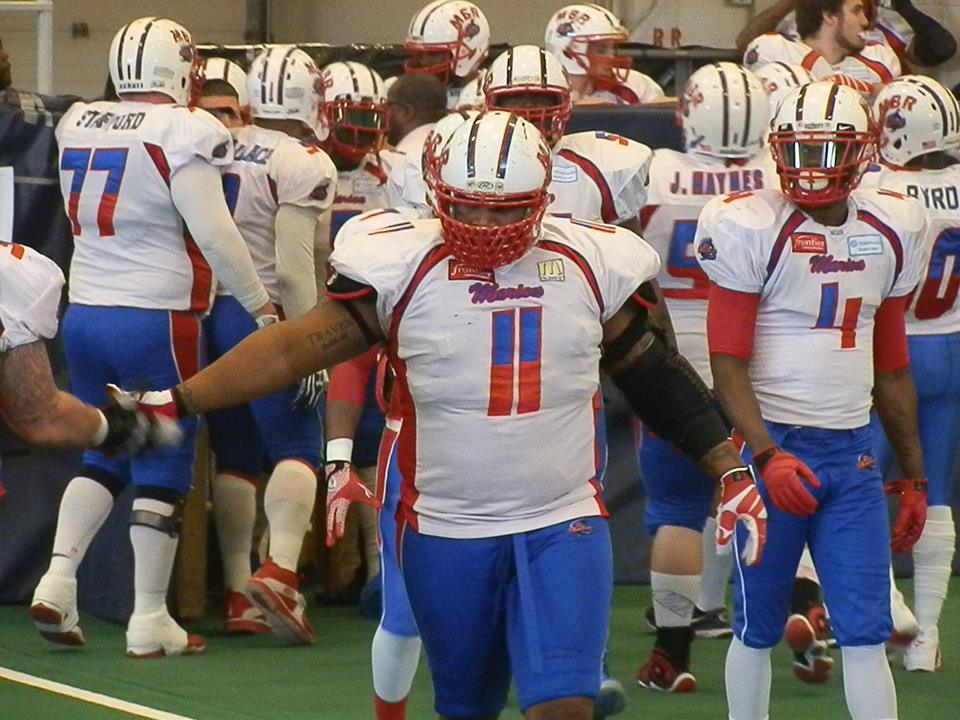
- McKenzie with the Marion Blue Racers in 2014

No. 48, 4, 9, 52, 11
- Position: Defensive end

Personal information
- Listed height: 6 ft 2 in (1.88 m)
- Listed weight: 265 lb (120 kg)

Career information
- High school: Etiwanda (Ca)
- NFL draft: 2005: undrafted

Career history
- Everett Hawks (2006); Marion Mayhem (2007–2010); Fort Wayne FireHawks (2010); Northern Kentucky River Monsters (2011); Marion Blue Racers (2012–2015)

Awards and highlights
- 4× 1st Team All-CIFL (2008, 2009, 2013, 2014); 2nd Team All-CIFL (2010); 1st Team All-UIFL (2011) (DL); UIFL Defensive Player of the Year (2011); Honorable Mention All-UIFL North (2012); CIFL MVP (2014)

Thomas "T.J." McKenzie is an American former indoor football defensive lineman.

== Early life ==
McKenzie graduated from Etiwanda High School in Etiwanda, Ca.

== Professional career ==
=== Marion Mayhem ===
Following the 2006 season, it was announced that McKenzie had signed with the Marion Mayhem of the Continental Indoor Football League. Thomas was a force for the Mayhem for many years. He set the CIFL record for sacks in a game with 4.0.

=== Fort Wayne FireHawks ===
After the Mayhem season ended abruptly in 2010, McKenzie, and several other Mayhem players, joined the Fort Wayne FireHawks to finish the 2010 season. The FireHawks, had locked up a playoff spot, when Marion folded. In the final game of the season, McKenzie broke his own record of 4.5 sacks, by recording 5.5 sacks against the Chicago Cardinals.

=== Northern Kentucky River Monsters ===
In 2011, McKenzie signed to play with the Northern Kentucky River Monsters of the Ultimate Indoor Football League, rather than sign with the newly formed Marion Blue Racers, which replaced the Mayhem. Thomas went on to set many records in the UIFL's inaugural season, on his way to earning Defensive Player of the Year honors.

=== Marion Blue Racers ===
For the 2012 season, McKenzie signed to play with the Marion Blue Racers. This will be McKenzie's return to Marion after playing with the Mayhem in 2010. McKenzie recorded 20 tackles, 11.5 tackles for loss and 12 sacks. His 12 sacks ranked 4th in the UIFL on the season, earning him Honorable Mention All-UIFL North Team. The Blue Racers returned to the CIFL for the 2013 season, and McKenzie with them. The Blue Racers had a disappointing season, but McKenzie did not, as he earned 1st Team All-CIFL honors for the 3 time in his career. McKenzie re-signed with the Blue Racers for 2014 and has also seen spot duty as fullback; he scored two touchdowns (one at each position) in that year's CIFL Championship Game, a 38–26 loss to the Erie Explosion. Despite the loss, McKenzie was named league MVP for the 2014 season.
