= 2014 Continental Indoor Football League season =

2014 CIFL season
- League: Continental Indoor Football League
- Sport: Indoor Football
- Duration: February 3, 2014 – May 5, 2014

Regular season
- Season champions: Saginaw Sting
- Season MVP: Thomas McKenzie (MAR)

Postseason
- North Division champions: Erie Explosion
- North Division runners-up: Saginaw Sting
- South Division champions: Marion Blue Racers
- South Division runners-up: Northern Kentucky River Monsters

2014 CIFL Championship Game
- Champions: Erie Explosion
- Runners-up: Marion Blue Racers

CIFL seasons
- ← 2013 2015 →

The 2014 Continental Indoor Football League season was the Continental Indoor Football League's ninth overall season. The regular season started on Monday February 3, with the Northern Kentucky River Monsters visiting the Bluegrass Warhorses at the Alltech Arena, and ended with the 2014 CIFL Championship Game, the league's championship game held on May 18.

The Erie Explosion successfully defended their championship from the previous year with a win over the Marion Blue Racers in the championship.

== Teams ==
The Kane County Dawgs, Kentucky Drillers and Owensboro Rage folded either during or after the 2013 season. The addition of the Bluegrass Warhorses, Chicago Slaughter, Kentucky Xtreme and the Northern Kentucky River Monsters prompted the league to make North and South Divisions for the 2014 season. The Slaughter folded in January, so the Chicago Blitz franchise was formed to take their place in 2014.

The Detroit Thunder, Kentucky Xtreme, Bluegrass Warhorses and Port Huron Patriots all ceased operations during the 2014 season.

== Schedule ==
For the 2013 season there was a 10-game, 14-week regular season running from February to May. Each team hosted 5 games, and had five away games.

== Regular season standings ==
2014 Continental Indoor Football League
Team	Overall				Division			
Team	W	L	T	PCT	W	L	T	PCT
North Division
y-Saginaw Sting	9	1	0	.900	6	1	0	.857
x-Erie Explosion	8	2	0	.800	5	1	0	.833
Chicago Blitz	7	3	0	.700	4	2	0	.667
z-Port Huron Patriots	1	8	0	.111	1	6	0	.143
z-Detroit Thunder	0	8	0	.000	0	6	0	.000
South Division
y-Marion Blue Racers	8	2	0	.800	6	0	0	1.000
x-Northern Kentucky River Monsters	7	3	0	.700	5	2	0	.714
Dayton Sharks	6	4	0	.600	4	3	0	.571
z-Bluegrass Warhorses	1	7	0	.125	1	5	0	.167
z-Kentucky Xtreme	0	5	0	.000	0	4	0	.000

- y - clinched division title
- x - clinched playoff spot
- z - ceased operations during season

== Playoffs ==
Division Championships
1	Saginaw	15
2	Erie	46
1	Marion	56
2	Northern Kentucky	40

CIFL Championship Game
N2	Erie	38
S1	Marion	26

== Coaching changes ==
=== Pre-season ===
Team	2014 Coach	2013 Coach(es)	Reason for leaving	Story/Accomplishments
Kentucky Xtreme	LaKunta Farmer	Roy McMillen	Resigned	In August, 2013, the Xtreme named, Defensive Coordinator LaKunta Farmer, the team's second head coach after Roy McMillen announced his resignation.

=== Midseason ===
Team	Interim coach	Original coach	Reason for leaving	Story/Accomplishments
Port Huron Patriots	None	Demar Crawford	Mutual decision	Crawford left the Patriots under disputed circumstances. Crawford claims he resigned from the team because the ownership was not paying its employees; most of the team's players resigned with him, forcing the team to play its next game with replacement players. Owner Jude Carter claimed Crawford had conducted in conduct detrimental to the team. After one game without a head coach, the Patriots prematurely ended their season.
Northern Kentucky River Monsters	Mike Goodpaster	Brian Schmidt	Fired	Schmidt left the River Monsters after three games and joined the staff of the Erie Explosion. Goodpaster was previously the team's defensive coordinator.
Saginaw Sting	James Perry II	Fred Townsend	Mutual decision	Just one day before the Sting's playoff game, head coach Fred Townsead announced his resignation. Line Coach James Perry II was named the teams interim head coach.

== Awards ==
=== Regular season awards ===
Award	Winner	Position	Team
CIFL MVP	Thomas McKenzie	Defensive end	Marion Blue Racers
Offensive Player of the Year	Aaron Smetanka	Quarterback	Erie Explosion
Defensive Player of the Year	Spencer Smith	Linebacker	Saginaw Sting
Special Teams Player of the Year	Julie Harshbarger	Kicker	Chicago Blitz

=== 1st Team All-CIFL ===
Offense
Quarterback	A. J. McKenna, Saginaw; Juice Williams, Chicago
Running back	DeShawn Hayes, Saginaw; Richard Stokes, Erie
Wide receiver	David Brown, Chicago; Daryl Gooden, Saginaw; Ricardo Lenhart, Northern Kentucky; Mike Tatum, Marion
Offensive lineman	Eric Brim, Saginaw; Dave McQuiston, Erie; Robert Price, Marion; Frank Straub, Northern Kentucky

Defense
Defensive lineman	Tim Green, Erie; Stephen Johnson, Erie; Desmond Kenner, Saginaw; Thomas McKenzie, Marion; DeAndre Mosely, Chicago
Linebacker	David James, Northern Kentucky; Spencer Smith, Saginaw
Defensive back	Tommy Harris, Northern Kentucky; Viterio Jones, Dayton; Ricardo Kemp, Erie

Special teams
Kicker	Julie Harshbarger, Chicago

=== 2nd Team All-CIFL ===
Offense
Quarterback	Tommy Jones, Dayton; Aaron Smetanka, Erie
Running back	A. J. Jimmerson, Port Huron; Bryant Pascascio, Chicago
Wide receiver	Eugene Cooper, Dayton; Bryceson Lawrence, Marion; Kent McDonald, Chicago, Derrick Sherer
Offensive lineman	Anthony Bullock, Chicago; Josh Ellison, Dayton; William Haase, Marion

Defense
Defensive end	Shonn Bell, Chicago; Luke Scarbough, Northern Kentucky; James Spikes, Marion
Linebacker	Justin Barnes, Saginaw; Jon D'Angelo, Erie; Sam Fornelli, Chicago
Defensive back	Donte Johnson, Dayton; Ahoma Maxwell, Northern Kentucky; LaTreze Mushatt, Saginaw; Steve Witherspoon, Marion

Special teams
Kicker	Dustin Zink, Northern Kentucky
