= Truist Arena =

Multi-purpose arena in Highland Heights, Kentucky

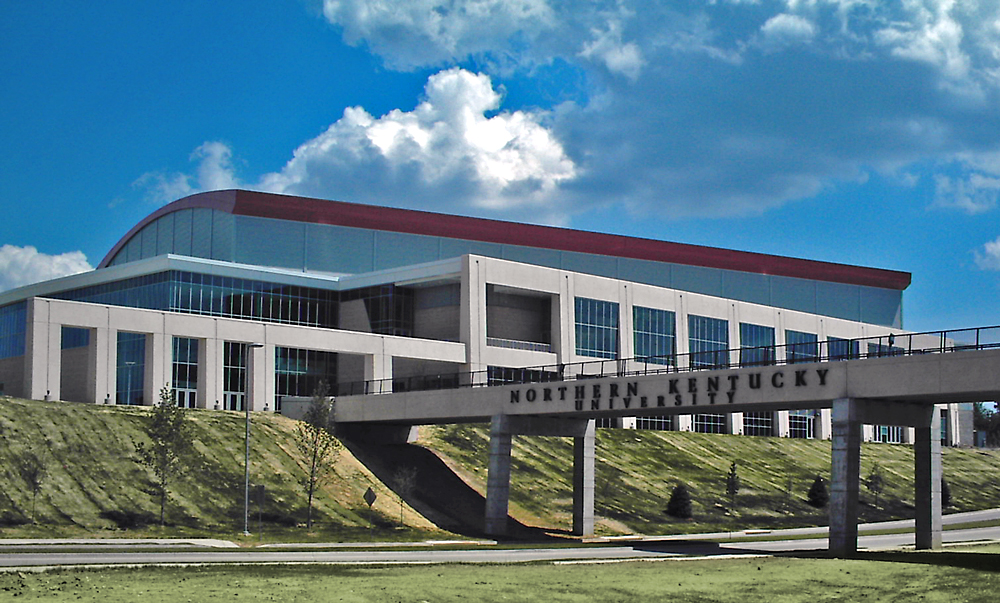
- Truist Arena, also referred to as "The Bank"
- Interactive map of Truist Arena
- Former names: The Bank of Kentucky Center (2008–2015); BB&T Arena (2015–2022)
- Location: 500 Nunn Drive; Highland Heights, Kentucky 41099
- Coordinates: 39.032273°N 84.458864°W
- Owner: Northern Kentucky University
- Operator: ASM Global
- Capacity: 8,427 (basketball); 9,400 (concerts)

Construction
- Groundbreaking: May 20, 2006
- Opened: May 10, 2008; 18 years ago
- Cost: $64 million ($95.7 million in 2025 dollars)
- Architects: 360 Architecture; GBBN Architects
- Structural engineer: THP Limited Inc.
- General contractor: Turner Construction

Tenants
- Northern Kentucky Norse (NCAA) 2008–present Northern Kentucky River Monsters (UIFL/CIFL) 2011, 2014; Black-n-Bluegrass RollerGirls (WFTDA) 2012–2013; Cincinnati Bearcats (NCAA) 2017–2018; Kentucky Barrels (AF1) 2026–present

Website
- thetruistarena.com

Truist Arena, formerly The Bank of Kentucky Center and BB&T Arena, is a 9,400-seat multi-purpose arena in Highland Heights, Kentucky, on the campus of Northern Kentucky University. The arena was topped off on June 21, 2007, and the first event held there was NKU's graduation ceremony on May 10, 2008. A grand opening ceremony was held on September 22, 2008.

The Northern Kentucky Norse are the main tenants, but many outside events are booked at the center. Among the first were country music star Carrie Underwood, comedian Jeff Dunham, and the cast of the reality television show So You Think You Can Dance as well as Cirque du Soleil, and the Walking With Dinosaurs live production. It hosted the Elite Eight of the NCAA Men's Division II Basketball Tournament in 2012. It was again set to host the Division II 2013 Elite Eight, but the NCAA moved the event to Freedom Hall in Louisville as NKU joined Division I (the NCAA would later go further by only holding the Elite Eight and Final Four matchups in Louisville; the Division II championship game was moved to Atlanta, Georgia's State Farm Arena with the Division III championship game as part of the celebration of 75 years of the men's Division I tournament, the Final Four of which was held in the Georgia Dome). On May 10, 2011, The Bank of Kentucky Center hosted WWE live. Other artists/performers that have visited the arena include Alan Jackson with Jana Kramer, Barry Manilow, Bill Engvall, Jeff Foxworthy, and Larry The Cable Guy, Blake Shelton, Bob Dylan, Dane Cook, Jason Aldean, Luke Bryan, Martina McBride, Trace Adkins, Jay-Z, REO Speedwagon, and Styx among others.

The first basketball event at the arena saw the NKU men's and women's basketball teams play Louisville on November 8, 2008.

The arena hosted the KHSAA Girls' Sweet Sixteen in high school basketball from 2016 through 2018, after which the event moved to Rupp Arena in Lexington.

On October 17, 2026, President Donald Trump held a rally ahead of the 2026 midterm elections. The rally was in support of Kentucky Republicans, including Ed Gallrein who beat incumbent Thomas Massie in the primary. At least one heckler briefly interrupted the rally and was removed.

== Sponsorship ==
The Bank of Kentucky agreed to cover 10% of the cost of the arena, up to $6 million, in exchange for naming rights. It will also get a luxury suite, access to premium tickets and free use of the facility rent free for one special event each year.

In 2015, the name of the arena was changed to the BB&T Arena after BB&T Corp. bought out The Bank of Kentucky. In 2020, BB&T merged with SunTrust, with the merged company renaming itself Truist. However, the arena continued to bear the BB&T name because Truist did not start rebranding its Kentucky locations with the new corporate name until late 2021. The Truist name was adopted for the arena shortly after the 2021–22 basketball season, taking effect on April 5, 2022.

== Tenants ==
Beginning in spring of 2011, Truist Arena was home to the Northern Kentucky River Monsters of the Ultimate Indoor Football League. After the season, the River Monsters agreed to part ways with the UIFL. The UIFL still had rights to place a team in the arena, so there will be an expansion team placed there, the Kentucky Monsters.

Truist Arena has also played host to the Black-n-Bluegrass Roller Girls since 2012. The home dates for the league in 2012 were: May 19, June 16, July 21, August 18, September 22, and October 20.

The Cincinnati Bearcats from the University of Cincinnati played their home games at what was then BB&T Arena during the 2017–18 season while Fifth Third Arena underwent renovations.

As of 2026, the arena will host the Arena Football One's Kentucky Barrels.

== See also ==
- List of NCAA Division I basketball arenas
