= Kentucky Horse Park =

Horse sport venue

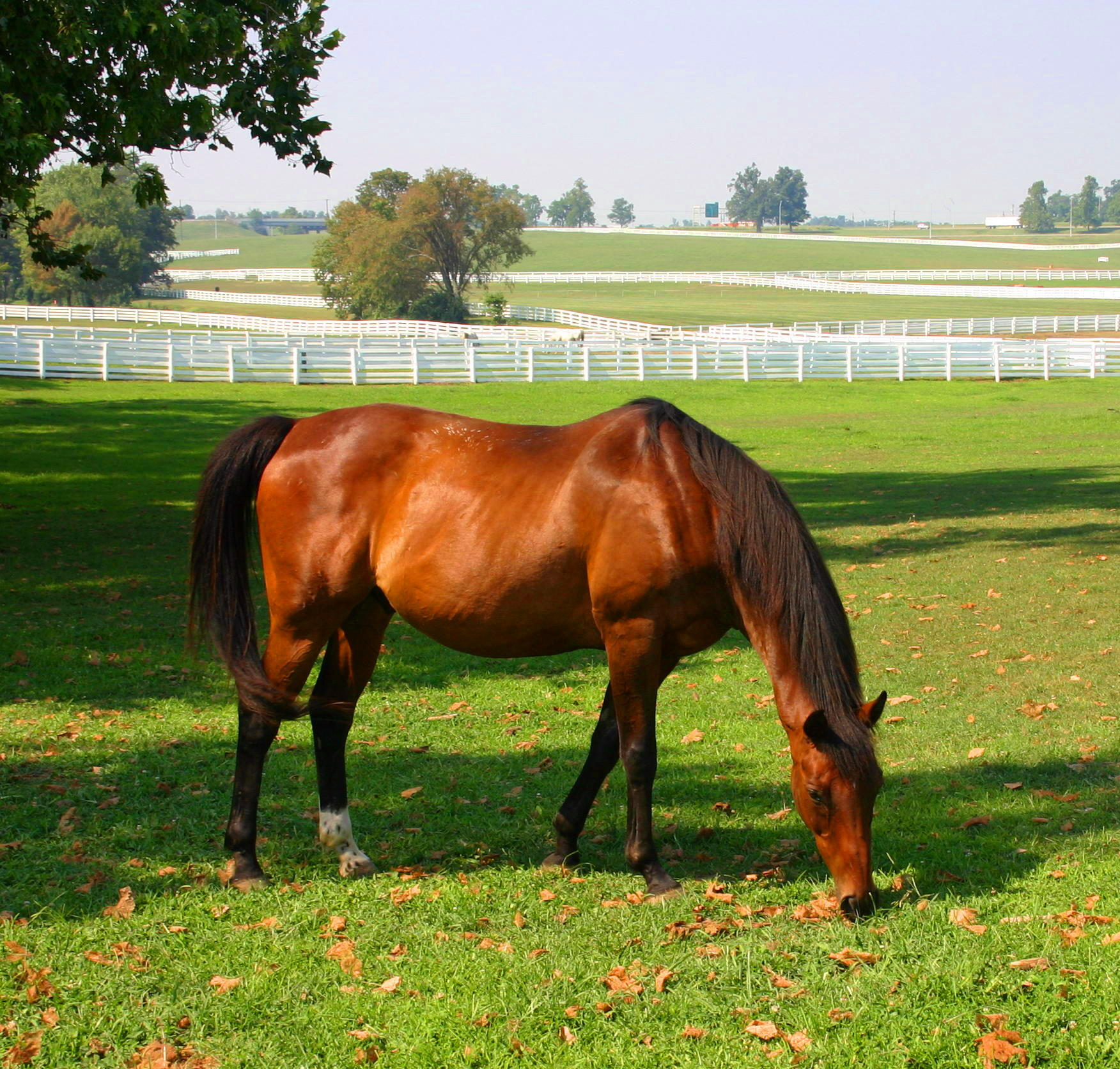
- Location: Fayette County, Kentucky, United States
- Nearest city: Lexington, Kentucky
- Coordinates: 38°09′N 84°31′W
- Area: 1,224 acres (4.95 km^{2})
- Established: 1978
- Visitors: 800,000 (in 2013)
- Governing body: Kentucky Tourism, Arts and Heritage Cabinet
- Website: www.kyhorsepark.com

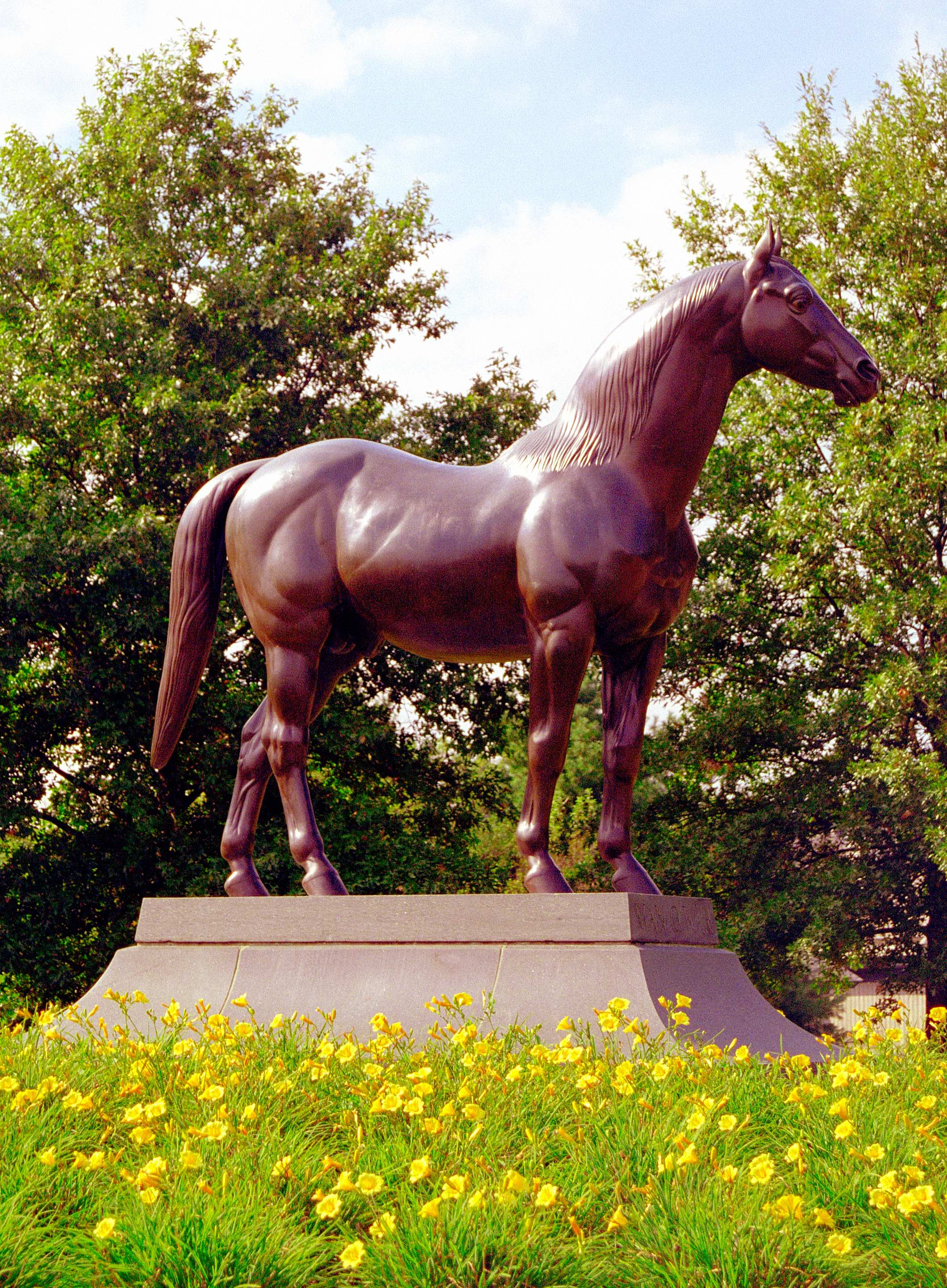
Man o' War statue

Kentucky Horse Park is a working horse farm, international equestrian competition venue, and an educational theme park opened in 1978 in Lexington, Kentucky. It is located off Kentucky State Highway 1973 (Iron Works Pike) and Interstate 75, at Exit 120, in northern Fayette County in the United States. The equestrian facility is a 1,224-acre (495 ha) park dedicated to "man's relationship with the horse." Open to the public, the park has a twice daily Horses of the World Show, showcasing both common and rare horses from around the globe. The horses are ridden in authentic costume. Each year the park is host to a number of special events and horse shows.

Additionally, the park contains the International Museum of the Horse, a Smithsonian Affiliate, which has a permanent collection of horse history and memorabilia, along with a rotating historical collection focused on a particular theme. Past themes include A Gift from the Desert (Arabia), Imperial China, and All the Queen's Horses (Britain).

Beginning with the 1979 arrival of Forego, one of the leading handicap horses of the 1970s, the Kentucky Horse Park has been home to some of the world's greatest competition horses, including John Henry, Horse of the Decade for the 1980s and the top money-winning Thoroughbred gelding in racing history. With the exception of a few months in 1986, John Henry lived at the park from 1985 until his death in 2007, alongside other racing greats such as Forego and his fellow 1970s champion Bold Forbes, and more recent residents Cigar, voted Horse of the Decade for the 1990s, and Da Hoss, the first horse to win Breeders' Cup races in non-consecutive years. In late 2008, the champions Alysheba and Funny Cide became residents, but Alysheba died at the park in March 2009. 1994 Kentucky Derby winner, Go For Gin, became a resident of the barn in 2011, while Cigar died at the park in 2014.

Besides Thoroughbred horses, Standardbred pacing greats such as Staying Together and Western Dreamer, Cam Fella, and Rambling Willie (all deceased), and Standardbred trotting champion Mr. Muscleman have made the Kentucky Horse Park their home, as well as 5-gaited American Saddlebred geldings CH Gypsy Supreme, CH Imperator and CH Sky Watch (all deceased).

== Park sculptures ==
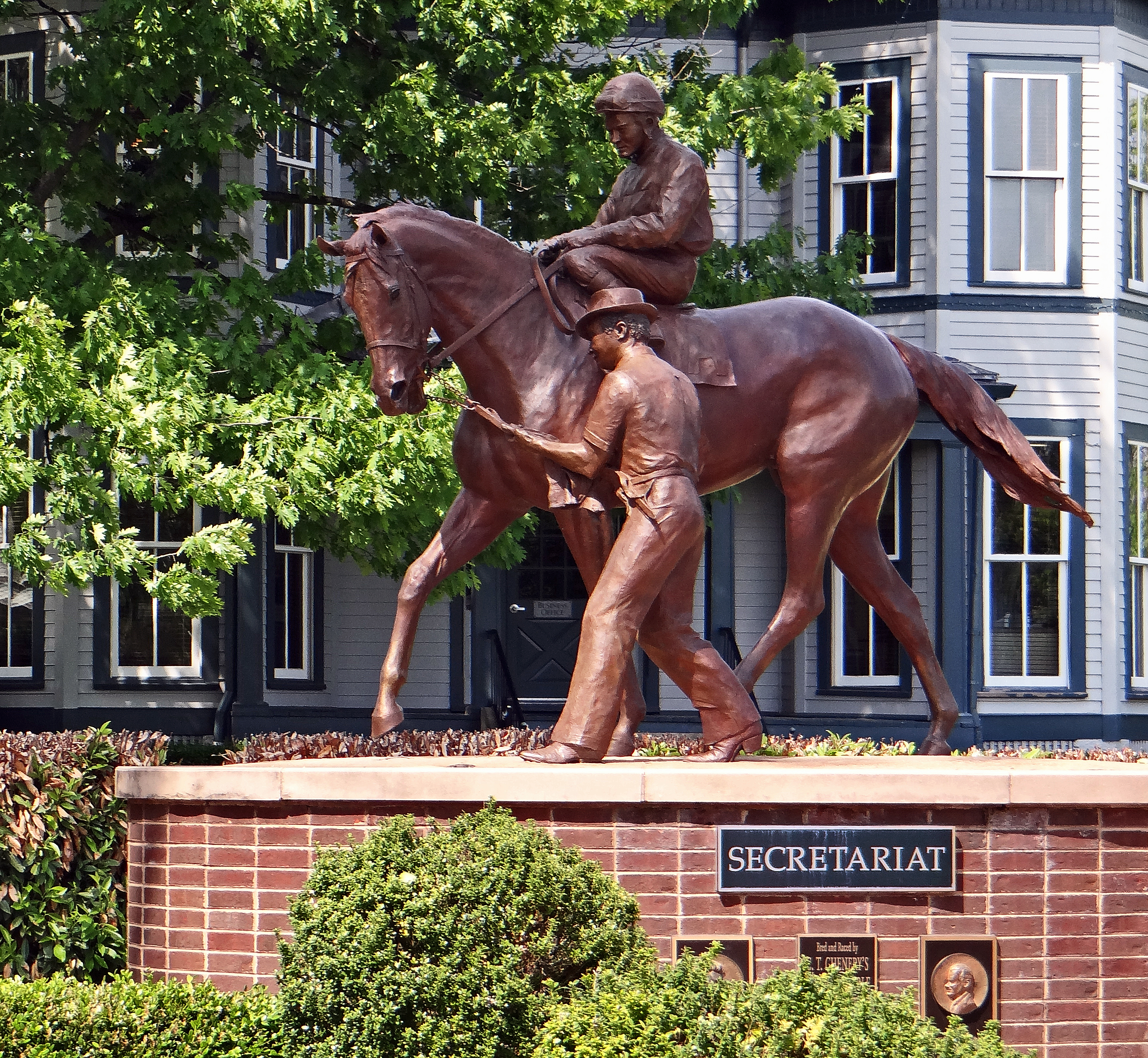
Secretariat, winner of the Triple Crown in 1973.

A number of horse sculptures stand in the Kentucky Horse Park, including a Man o' War statue on a pedestal near the entrance, over the horse's grave, which was moved here from Faraway Farm during the establishment of the park in the 1970s. There is also a life-size statue of the 1973 U.S. Triple Crown winner Secretariat with jockey Ron Turcotte aboard being led by groom Eddie Sweat, sculpted by Jim Reno. From harness racing, there is a statue of Bret Hanover.

== Kentucky Horse Park's National Horse Center ==
The Kentucky Horse Park also contains the National Horse Center, headquarters for more than 30 national, regional and state equine organizations and associations including:

- American Association of Equine Practitioners
- American Farrier's Association
- American Hackney Horse Society
- American Hanoverian Society
- American Morgan Horse Association
- American Saddlebred Horse Association
- Carriage Association of America
- Kentucky Horse Racing Authority
- Equestrian Events, Inc.
- United States Hunter/Jumper Association
- United States Dressage Federation
- United States Equestrian Federation
- United States Pony Clubs, Inc.

For a list of all 30+ organizations in one place, with contacts, see the Kentucky Horse Park website.

== Rolex Stadium ==
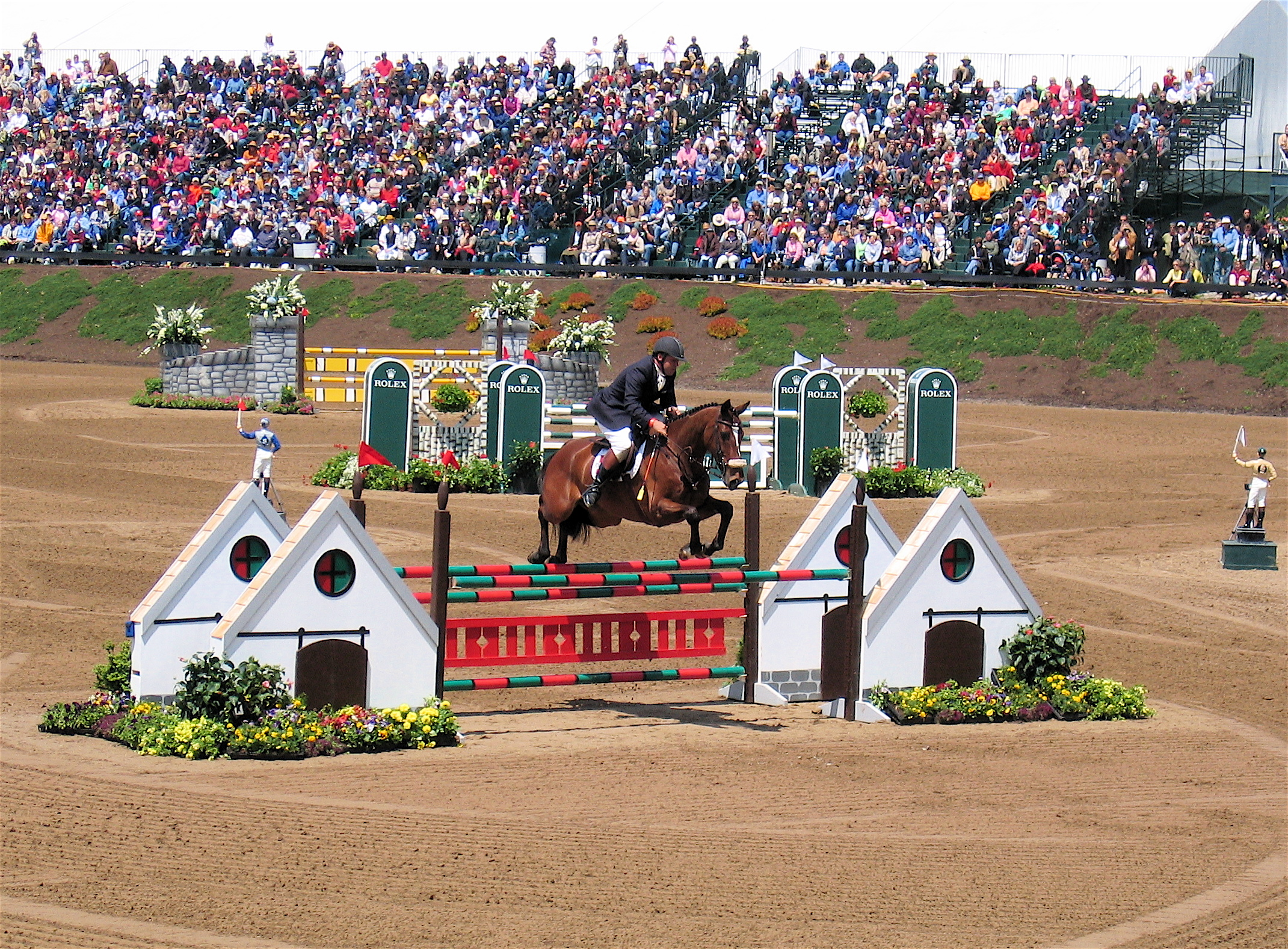
Rolex Stadium

Rolex Stadium is the primary outdoor event venue in the complex. The stadium seats 7,338 in its main grandstand but can accommodate up to 37,338 total capacity when bleachers seating up to 30,000 are used, primarily for larger outdoor horse shows, concerts, and other sporting events. Its show ring measures 306 feet by 406 feet, with the flooring made of sand and fiber; however, artificial turf has been brought into the stadium for soccer and football games on occasion, among other events. It is the largest outdoor concert venue in Central Kentucky with a capacity of up to nearly 52,000. There are six concession stands at the stadium and six restrooms, meaning that concession and restroom facilities may be limited for events that require larger capacity; however Rolex Stadium features an 18-by-33-foot Daktronics ProStar LED videoscreen.

== Alltech Arena ==
Alltech Arena is Kentucky Horse Park's 5,520-seat indoor arena, expandable to 8,500 for concerts. The arena floor and championship ring measures 135 feet by 300 feet; in addition in indoor horse shows, Alltech Arena can also be used for indoor football, ice hockey, basketball, circuses, boxing, wrestling, concerts, and other special events. The arena contains nine luxury suites, 222 VIP box seats and a 4,000-square-foot club lounge seating up to 80 patrons. The arena floor is below street level; the arena concourse, with 50,000 square feet of space, overlooks the arena floor and contains six concession stands. There are also two box offices at the arena.

== Events ==
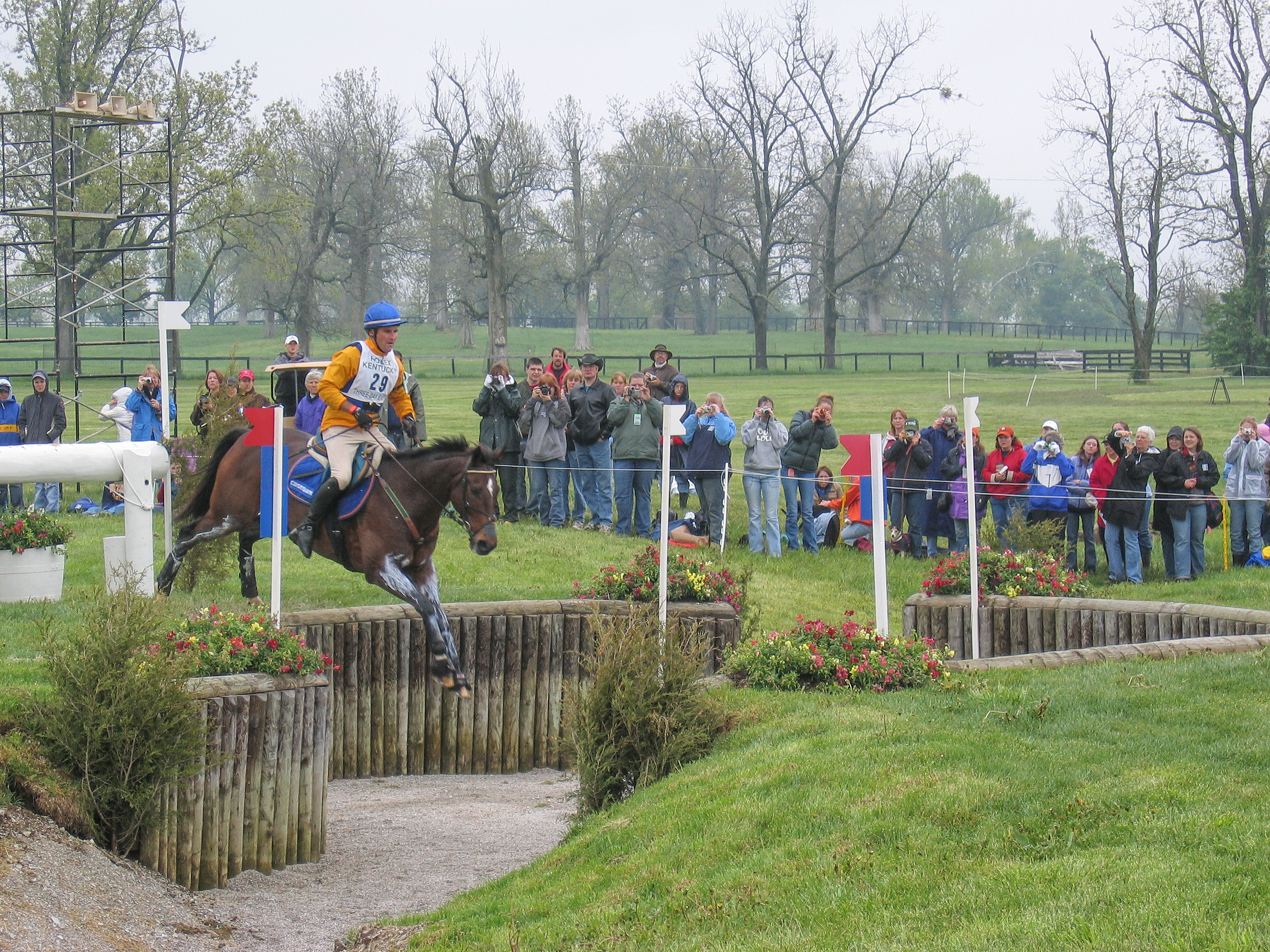
Cross-country eventing on the grounds

The Kentucky Horse Park hosts diverse educational events and competitions. Past examples include:

- The annual Kentucky Three-Day Event held at the park since hosting the 1978 World Three-Day Championships
- The annual High Hope Steeplechase since 1974
- The annual Southern Lights holiday festival since 1993
- The National Pony Club Championships every 3 years
- North American Junior and Young Rider Championships, a prestigious event for talented horseback riders ages 14–21, since 2009
- The USEF Pony Finals, the pony hunter/jumper national championships since 2008
- National Horse Show

Also, in 2015 the park became the new home of the Ichthus Music Festival, a major Christian music festival originally held in nearby Wilmore until its temporary demise following its 2012 edition.

For a constantly up-to-date list of all park events, see the Kentucky Horse Park website.

== 2010 Alltech FEI World Equestrian Games ==
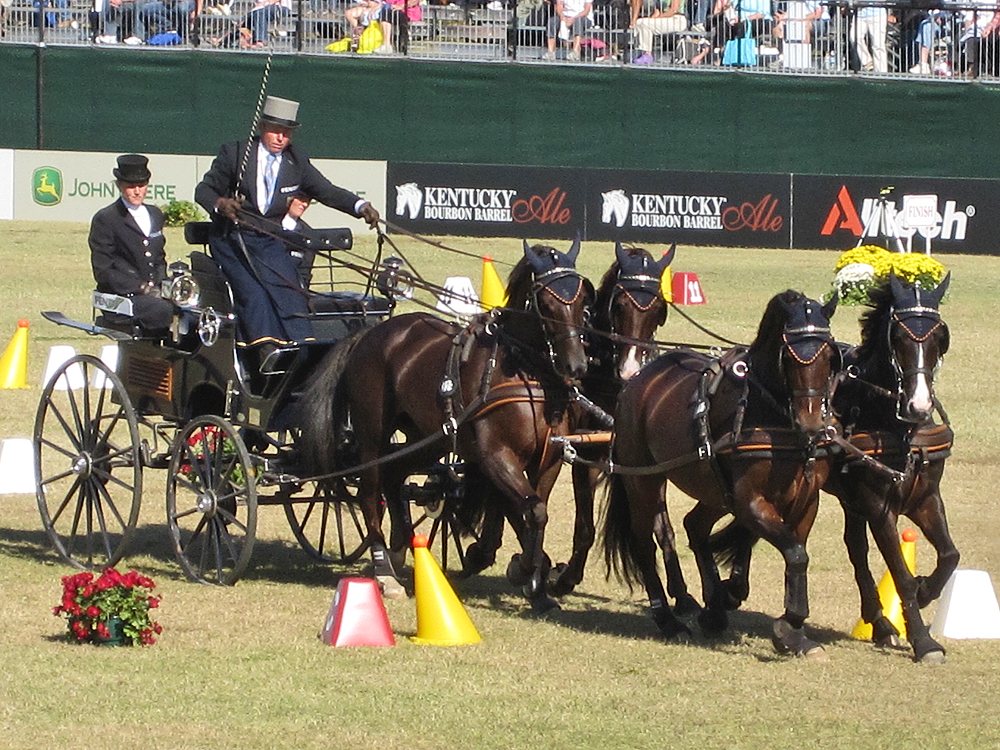
World Equestrian Games Driving 2010

On December 6, 2005, it was announced that Lexington and the Kentucky Horse Park would host the 2010 FEI World Equestrian Games in September and October. The 2010 games marked the first time the games were held outside of Europe; additionally, the eight Olympic-level world championships had never been held together in a single location within Europe.

As part of the games, several improvements to the park were slated:

- The $36 million Alltech Arena was approved in 2006 by the Kentucky General Assembly (legislature).
- Enhancements to the arena's sound system.
- A resort hotel was planned to be constructed near the park.

On February 1, 2007, Governor Ernie Fletcher announced that he would seek an additional $38.3 million in improvements to the park in preparation for the games and other major horse events. In his address to the 2007 General Assembly the governor suggested:

- $24 million for a new outdoor stadium that would feature 10,075 permanent seats but could be expanded to 30,325 temporarily for major events.
- $4 million for an additional 21,000 sq ft (2,000 m^{2}) of exhibition space for vendors.
- $10.3 million for roadway improvements inside the park that would give the facility a second entrance via the campground. A wide loop road would be constructed so that events could be held on both sides of the horse park.

=== Funding ===
The new indoor stadium and additional exhibition space, costing $28 million, would be financed with 20-year bonds. The roadway improvements, at $10.3 million within the park, would come from the state highway fund. The resort hotel would be constructed and financed without state funds.

== Administration ==
Although the park is owned by the state government, it is administered separately from the state park system.
