= 2013 Detroit Thunder season =

Sports season

- Owner: Terrence & Lawrence Foster
- General manager: Mike Piasecki
- Head coach: Terrence Foster
- Home stadium: Taylor Sportsplex

Results
- Record: 4-6
- Division place: 5th
- Playoffs: Did not qualify

The 2013 Detroit Thunder season was the first season for the Continental Indoor Football League (CIFL) franchise.

On November 1, 2012, the Thunder was officially announced as the CIFL's eleventh team for the 2013 season. The team is owned by David and Cynthia Kinsman, who also own the Port Huron Patriots in the same league. In addition, the Michigan Cup was announces as the trophy the Thunder, Patriots, and Saginaw Sting would compete for during the 2013 season. On November 9, 2012, David Kinsman announced the Thunder would be playing their home games at the Taylor Sportsplex in Taylor, Michigan for the 2013 season, with the hopes to move to a larger venue in 2014.

== Roster ==
Detroit Thunder roster
Quarterbacks: 12 Mike Akrawi; 7 Dan Richards; Austin Swirple; Running backs: 10 Andre Bell; Wide receivers: -- Dominick Brown; -- Reginald Collins; 5 R Enbamkh; 3 Darryl Frager; -- Nathan Fricke; -- Dominique Mitchell; -- Carlos Robinson; -- Edward Thomas	Offensive linemen: currently vacant; Defensive linemen: -- Markel McKinnley; 51 Luther Robinson; 58 Eric Summers; 44 Tone Woods; Linebackers: 9 Mark Carter; 20 Doug Emery	Defensive backs: 26 D Clark; 8 D'Ante Neal; 22 Musa O'Deh; -- James Skodak; 2 Jaa Valentine; Kickers: currently vacant	Injured Reserve: currently vacant; Exempt List: currently vacant; Practice squad: currently vacant; rookies in italics; Roster updated February 22, 2013; 22 Active, 0 Inactive, 0 PS

== Schedule ==
=== Regular season ===
Week	Date	Kickoff	Opponent	Results		Game site
Week	Date	Kickoff	Opponent	Final score	Team record	Game site
1	February 9	7:30 P.M. EST	at Port Huron Patriots	L 20-41	0-1	McMorran Arena
2	Bye					
3	February 24	4:00 P.M. EST	Erie Explosion	L 27-64	0-2	Taylor Sportsplex
4	March 3	4:00 P.M. EST	Saginaw Sting	L 49-63	0-3	Taylor Sportsplex
5	March 10	4:00 P.M. EST	Kane County Dawgs	W 2-0	1-3	Taylor Sportsplex
6	March 17	4:00 P.M. EST	Port Huron Patriots	W 42-35	2-3	Taylor Sportsplex
7	March 24	4:00 P.M. EST	Kentucky Xtreme	L 49-21	2-4	Taylor Sportsplex
8	Bye					
9	April 6	7:30 P.M. EST	at Kentucky Drillers	W 40-24	3-4	Eastern Kentucky Expo Center
10	April 14	2:00 P.M. EST	at Erie Explosion	L 37-61	3-5	Erie Insurance Arena
11	April 20	7:00 p.m. CST	at Owensboro Rage	W 2-0	4-5	The Next Level Sports Facility
12	April 27	7:30 p.m. EST	at Saginaw Sting	L 34-52	4-6	Dow Event Center

=== Standings ===
2013 Continental Indoor Football League
Team	W	L	T	PCT	PF	PA	PF (Avg.)	PA (Avg.)	STK
y-Erie Explosion	10	0	0	1.000	467	218	46.7	21.8	W10
x-Dayton Sharks	8	2	0	.800	478	303	47.8	30.3	L2
x-Saginaw Sting	8	2	0	.800	377	320	37.7	32.0	W3
x-Kentucky Xtreme	7	3	0	.700	497	328	49.7	32.8	W2
Detroit Thunder	4	6	0	.400	282	389	28.2	38.9	L1
Port Huron Patriots	4	6	0	.400	255	336	25.5	33.6	L1
Kentucky Drillers	2	8	0	.200	270	475	27.0	47.5	W1
Marion Blue Racers	2	8	0	.200	317	428	31.7	42.8	W1
Owensboro Rage	5	5	0	.500	195	267	19.5	26.7	L2
Kane County Dawgs^{†}	0	1	0	.000	13	69	13	69	L1

y - clinched home playoff game

x - clinched playoff spot

^{†}Kane County played the second game on their schedule, but forfeited the other nine.

== Coaching staff ==
2013 Detroit Thunder staff
Front office: Co-Owner/Marketing and Sales - Terrence Foster; Co-Owner – Lawrence Foster; General manager - Mike Piasecki	Head coach: Head coach - Terry Foster; Offensive coaches: Co-Offensive Coordinator – Lawrence Foster; Co-Offensive Coordinator – Rob Hunt; Offensive line – Danny Foster; Defensive coaches: Defensive coordinator – Terrence Foster; Defensive line – Danny Foster
