= 2013 Saginaw Sting season =

- Owner: Stuart Schweigert, Rob Licht & Tom O'Brien
- General manager: Rob Licht
- Head coach: Fred Townsend
- Home stadium: Dow Event Center

Results
- Record: 8-2
- Division place: 3rd
- Playoffs: Lost CIFL Championship Game vs Erie Explosion (36-37)

The 2013 Saginaw Sting season was the fifth season for the Continental Indoor Football League (CIFL) franchise.

The Sting's first move in its quest for a title defense in 2013 happened when they re-signed Head Coach Fred Townsend to a 3-year contract extension.

== Roster ==
2013 Saginaw Sting roster
Quarterbacks: 7 A. J. McKenna; 9 Adam Houthoofd; Running backs: 20 DeShawn Hayes; Wide receivers: 8 Jeff Austin; 18 Daryl Gooden; 4 Ryan Kantola; 1 C. J. Tarver	Offensive linemen: 64 Eric Brim; 69 Jordan Derosia; 66 Josh Pack; 93 Chris Saunders; Defensive linemen: 96 Amir Abu-Aita; 52 Robert Cross; 93 Jon Horton; 57 Omari Humes; 56 Daniel Jackson; 15 Nate Snyder	Linebackers: 6 Andrew Deweerd; 24 Joe Makowsk; Defensive backs: 13 DeMarcus Copes; 5 Jamaal Hibler; 2 Jamar Hibler; 11 Shuan Hladki; 34 Damion Horton; 28 Herb Waits; Special teams: 37 Chris Kollias	Reserve lists: currently vacant; rookies in italics; Roster updated February 19, 2013; 26 Active, 0 Inactive, 0 PS

== Schedule ==
=== Regular season ===
Week	Date	Kickoff	Opponent	Results		Game site
Week	Date	Kickoff	Opponent	Final score	Team record	Game site
1	February 8	7:30 P.M. EST	Marion Blue Racers	W 49-28	1-0	Dow Event Center
2	February 17	4:00 P.M. EST	at Kentucky Xtreme	W 37-33	2-0	Freedom Hall
3	February 23	7:30 P.M. EST	at Port Huron Patriots	W 61-28	3-0	McMorran Arena
4	March 3	4:00 P.M. EST	Detroit Thunder	W 63-49	4-0	Taylor Sportsplex
5	Bye					
6	March 18	7:00 P.M. EST	Kane County Dawgs	W 2-0	5-0	Dow Event Center
7	March 24	4:00 P.M. EST	at Dayton Sharks	L 42-68	5-1	Hara Arena
8	March 29	7:30 p.m. EST	Erie Explosion	L 20-52	5-2	Erie Insurance Arena
9	Bye					
10	April 13	7:30 P.M. EST	Port Huron Patriots	W 49-28	6-2	Dow Event Center
11	April 20	7:00 p.m. CST	at Kane County Dawgs	W 2-0	7-2	Canlan Ice Sports Arena
12	April 27	7:30 p.m. EST	Detroit Thunder	W 52-34	8-2	Dow Event Center

=== Standings ===
2013 Continental Indoor Football League
Team	W	L	T	PCT	PF	PA	PF (Avg.)	PA (Avg.)	STK
y-Erie Explosion	10	0	0	1.000	467	218	46.7	21.8	W10
x-Dayton Sharks	8	2	0	.800	478	303	47.8	30.3	L2
x-Saginaw Sting	8	2	0	.800	377	320	37.7	32.0	W3
x-Kentucky Xtreme	7	3	0	.700	497	328	49.7	32.8	W2
Detroit Thunder	4	6	0	.400	282	389	28.2	38.9	L1
Port Huron Patriots	4	6	0	.400	255	336	25.5	33.6	L1
Kentucky Drillers	2	8	0	.200	270	475	27.0	47.5	W1
Marion Blue Racers	2	8	0	.200	317	428	31.7	42.8	W1
Owensboro Rage	5	5	0	.500	195	267	19.5	26.7	L2
Kane County Dawgs^{†}	0	1	0	.000	13	69	13	69	L1

y - clinched home playoff game

x - clinched playoff spot

^{†}Kane County played the second game on their schedule, but forfeited the other nine.

=== Postseason ===
Week	Date	Kickoff	Opponent	Results		Game site
Week	Date	Kickoff	Opponent	Final score	Team record	Game site
1	May 4	7:30 P.M. EST	Dayton Sharks	W 66-63	1-0	Dow Event Center
2	May 12	4:30 P.M. EST	at Erie Explosion	L 36-37	1-1	Erie Insurance Arena

== Coaching staff ==
2013 Saginaw Sting staff
Front office: Co-Owner/General Manager – Robert Licht; Co-Owner/Director of Football Operations – Stuart Schweigert; Co-Owner/Director of Business Sales – James O'Brien; Assistant general manager – Bill Wheeler; Front Office Manager - Tyler Vienot; Head coach: Head Coach/Defensive Coordinator - Fred Townsend; Offensive coaches: Offensive Coordinator -; Wide receivers –; Offensive line –	Defensive coaches: Defensive line –; Linebackers –; Secondary –
