= 2013 Dayton Sharks season =

- Owner: Troy Gantz
- General manager: Troy Gantz
- Head coach: Chris Taylor
- Home stadium: Hara Arena

Results
- Record: 8-2
- Division place: 2nd
- Playoffs: Lost semi-finals (Sting) 63-66

The 2013 Dayton Sharks season was the first season for the Continental Indoor Football League (CIFL) franchise.

In July 2012, the team announced CA Sports Entertainment LLC. was awarded an expansion franchise in Dayton, Ohio and that the team would be named the Dayton Sharks. The Sharks filled the void left after the Dayton Silverbacks folded at the conclusion of the 2012 season. The team is led by Corwyn Thomas, who is the team's Managing General Partner, CEO and Chairman. The team signed many local players, who have a track record for success, such at Tommy Jones and Robert Redd. The franchise played its first game on February 15, defeating the Port Huron Patriots, 16-64. Over 2,500 turned out to the Sharks' opening game.

== Players ==
=== Signings ===
Position	Player	2012 Team
QB	Tommy Jones	Saginaw Sting
QB	Evan Sawyer	Dayton Silverbacks
RB	Derrick Moss	Cincinnati Commandos
WR	Melvin Bryant	Marion Blue Racers
WR	Shawn McGarity	Cincinnati Commandos
WR	Kenzey Mincy	Cincinnati Commandos
WR	Robert Redd	Cleveland Gladiators
OL	Josh Barnett	Dayton Silverbacks
OL	Josh Ellison	Dayton Silverbacks
OL	Frank Straub	Cincinnati Commandos
DL	Darrell Brown	Cincinnati Commandos
DL	Thomas Claggett	Cincinnati Commandos
DL	James Spikes	Cincinnati Commandos
LB	Santino Turnbow	Cincinnati Commandos
DB	Viterio Jones	Dayton Silverbacks
DB	Chris Respress	Dayton Silverbacks
DB	Melvin Thomas	Dayton Silverbacks
K	Zack Van Zandt	Dayton Silverbacks

=== Roster ===
2013 Dayton Sharks roster
Quarterbacks: 4 Tommy Jones; 11 Evan Sawyer; Running backs: 21 Derrick Moss; Wide receivers: 8 Melvin Bryant; 6 Shawn McGarity; 3 Kyenes Mincy; 1 Robert Redd; 18 Derrick Shearer	Offensive linemen: 75 Josh Barnett; 88 Chad Diggs; 72 Josh Ellison; 69 Tyler Mann; 89 Andrew Phelan; 85 Frank Straub; Defensive linemen: 50 Darrell Brown; 90 Thomas Claggett; 44 D'Andre Martin; 5 Rico Middlebrooks; 55 James Spikes	Linebackers: 20 Damian McIntosh; 52 Santino Turnbow; Defensive backs: 10 Viterio Jones; 7 Demetrius McCray; 37 Chris Respress; 29 Melvin Thomas; 13 Ryan Williams; 2 Norman Young; Special teams: 42 Zack Van Zant	Injured Reserve: currently vacant; Exempt List: currently vacant; Practice squad: currently vacant; rookies in italics Roster updated February 15, 2013; 28 Active, 0 Inactive, 0 PS

== Schedule ==
=== Regular season ===
Week	Date	Kickoff	Opponent	Results		Game site
Week	Date	Kickoff	Opponent	Final score	Team record	Game site
1	Bye					
2	February 15	7:30 P.M. EST	Port Huron Patriots	W 64-16	1-0	Hara Arena
3	February 22	7:00 P.M. CST	at Owensboro Rage	W 54-14	2-0	The Next Level Sports Facility
4	March 2	7:00 P.M. EST	at Marion Blue Racers	W 47-28	3-0	Veterans Memorial Coliseum
5	March 10	4:00 P.M. EST	at Kentucky Drillers	W 62-35	4-0	Eastern Kentucky Expo Center
6	March 17	4:00 P.M. EST	Kentucky Drillers	W 55-12	5-0	Hara Arena
7	March 24	4:00 P.M. EST	Saginaw Sting	W 68-42	6-0	Hara Arena
8	Bye					
9	April 6	7:30 P.M. EST	at Port Huron Patriots	W 38-35	7-0	McMorran Arena
10	April 14	4:00 P.M. EST	Kentucky Xtreme	W 47-41	8-0	Hara Arena
11	April 20	7:30 p.m. EST	Erie Explosion	L 14-21	8-1	Hara Arena
12	April 27	7:30 p.m. EST	at Kentucky Xtreme	L 29-59	8-2	Freedom Hall

=== Standings ===
2013 Continental Indoor Football League
Team	W	L	T	PCT	PF	PA	PF (Avg.)	PA (Avg.)	STK
y-Erie Explosion	10	0	0	1.000	467	218	46.7	21.8	W10
x-Dayton Sharks	8	2	0	.800	478	303	47.8	30.3	L2
x-Saginaw Sting	8	2	0	.800	377	320	37.7	32.0	W3
x-Kentucky Xtreme	7	3	0	.700	497	328	49.7	32.8	W2
Detroit Thunder	4	6	0	.400	282	389	28.2	38.9	L1
Port Huron Patriots	4	6	0	.400	255	336	25.5	33.6	L1
Kentucky Drillers	2	8	0	.200	270	475	27.0	47.5	W1
Marion Blue Racers	2	8	0	.200	317	428	31.7	42.8	W1
Owensboro Rage	5	5	0	.500	195	267	19.5	26.7	L2
Kane County Dawgs^{†}	0	1	0	.000	13	69	13	69	L1

y - clinched home playoff game

x - clinched playoff spot

^{†}Kane County played the second game on their schedule, but forfeited the other nine.

=== Postseason ===
Week	Date	Kickoff	Opponent	Results		Game site
Week	Date	Kickoff	Opponent	Final score	Team record	Game site
Semi-finals	May 4	7:30 P.M. EST	at Saginaw Sting	L 63-66	0-1	Dow Event Center

== Coaching staff ==
2013 Dayton Sharks staff
Front office: Managing General Partner - Corwyn Thomas; President/General Manager - Troy Gantz; Director of Corporate Sales & Executive Assistant - Sarah Hettesheimer; Assistant General Manager/Director of Football Operations - Michael Kiraly; Chief Financial Officer - Mike McCormick; Legal Counsel - Brad Weber; Chief Marketing Officer - Danielle Hagen; Head coach: Head coach – Chris Taylor; Offensive coaches: Offensive coordinator – Tommy Jones; Wide Receivers - Kenny Burress; Offensive line – Derrick Shepard	Defensive coaches: Defensive line – Sean Middlebrooks; Secondary – LaVar Glover; Special teams coaches: Special Teams Coordinator - Jason Freshwater
