= Louisville Xtreme =

Indoor football team based in Louisville, Kentucky, USA

General information
- Founded: 2012
- Folded: 2021
- Headquartered: Louisville, Kentucky at KFC Yum! Center
- Colors: Red, black, white
- LOUXtreme.com

Personnel
- Owner: Victor Cole
- General manager: Victor Cole
- Head coach: Mark Stoute
- President: Chris Redman

Team history
- Kentucky Xtreme (2013–2015); Louisville Xtreme (2017–2021)

Home fields
- Freedom Hall (2013–2014); KFC Yum! Center (2021)

League / conference affiliations
- Continental Indoor Football League (2013–2014); South Division (2014); Indoor Football League (2021)

Playoff appearances (1)
- 2013

The Louisville Xtreme were an indoor football team based in Louisville, Kentucky, with home games at the KFC Yum! Center. They began play as the Kentucky Xtreme in the Continental Indoor Football League (CIFL) in 2013 and 2014. Midway through the 2014 CIFL season, the league removed the team's membership and the Xtreme temporarily suspended operations. After playing the 2015 season in the semi-professional Minor League Football Alliance (MLFA), the team rebranded as the Louisville Xtreme in 2017. In 2020, the Xtreme were added to the American Arena League (AAL) but cancelled its season citing the COVID-19 pandemic. For the 2021 season, the Xtreme were announced to be joining the National Arena League, but instead joined the Indoor Football League three months later.

The Xtreme were the first indoor football team in the Louisville area since the af2's Louisville Fire folded in 2008. The co-owners of the CIFL Xtreme were Victor Cole and Mario Urrutia. While in the CIFL, the Xtreme played their home games at Freedom Hall in Louisville, but was suspended by the league after Urrutia abandoned the team to join the Winnipeg Blue Bombers midseason. Cole remained the managing owner after the team was removed from the CIFL.

== History ==
The Xtreme was organized in 2012 when Victor Cole and five other partners decided to use the money they had saved up from their tours in Afghanistan. The Kentucky Xtreme played in the Interstate Football League, winning the 2012 championship. In 2012, the Xtreme played a preseason exhibition game against the Evansville Rage of the Continental Indoor Football League (CIFL), losing 26–56. After the 2012 CIFL season, the Xtreme played another exhibition game against the CIFL's Indianapolis Enforcers, where the Xtreme defeated the Enforcers 20–16.

=== CIFL: 2013–2014 ===
In July 2012, the Xtreme announced that they would be playing at Freedom Hall in Louisville, Kentucky, and had officially joined the CIFL as an expansion team in the South Division for the 2013 season. The team named former Louisville Fire assistant coach Roy McMillen as their first head coach. The Xtreme went on to have 7–3 record and made the playoffs, where they lost the Erie Explosion 55–6 in the semifinal game.

The Xtreme returned to the CIFL in 2014. In August 2013, the Xtreme named LaKunta Farmer the team's second head coach after McMillen resigned. In November 2013, former Arena Football League Rookie of the Year Award winner Mario Urrutia joined the Xtreme ownership group and would also play on the team. They started the season 0–5, including two forfeit losses. After their second forfeit, the CIFL announced that the Xtreme had been suspended by the league and that affiliate teams would fill out the Xtreme's remaining road games. Following the season, the CIFL effectively ceased operations.

=== Semi-professional leagues: 2015–2020 ===
In 2015, the Kentucky Xtreme played in the indoor/outdoor Minor League Football Alliance (MLFA). The team made it to the championship game, where they lost to the Toledo Thunder 7–6.

The team went dormant until it updated its team name to Louisville Xtreme in 2017. It then began to pursue joining a league in 2019 and played a game against the Indianapolis Enforcers, who had become a member on the American Arena League (AAL), and lost 40–6. The Xtreme were then accepted as an expansion team in the AAL for the 2020 season and named Mark Stoute head coach. The team withdrew from the 2020 season on March 13 before playing a game citing the COVID-19 pandemic. The AAL also ultimately cancelled its season due to the pandemic.

=== IFL: 2021 ===
After the cancellation of the 2020 season, the Xtreme announced they were joining the National Arena League (NAL). On July 24, 2020, former NFL player Chris Redman, a Louisville native and resident, was named the team's new president, also taking an ownership interest in the team. On October 30, the NAL announced the team's league membership was terminated citing they did not present the league with a required letter of credit and did not want to participate in the 2021 season, but the team then announced it had joined the Indoor Football League (IFL) on November 6. On February 22, 2021, the Xtreme announced that they had signed a three-year lease to play their home games at the KFC Yum! Center.

The Xtreme were one of four teams to start the 2021 IFL season before the rest of the league on April 24. The team's June 12 home game against the Green Bay Blizzard was then postponed for undisclosed reasons. On June 14, 2021, the IFL terminated the Xtreme's membership after five games played due to failing to maintain the league's minimum obligations and did not finish the season.

== Logos ==
Original logo mockup

2013 Official Logo

== Season-by-season results ==
League champions	Division champions	Playoff berth	League leader

Season	League	Division	Regular season				Postseason results
Season	League	Division	Finish	Wins	Losses	Ties	Postseason results
2013	CIFL		4th	7	3	0	Lost CIFL semifinal (Erie) 6–55
2014	CIFL	South	Folded	0	5	0	
2021	IFL		Terminated	0	5	0	
Totals				7	13	0	All-time regular season record (2013–2014; 2021)
Totals				0	1	—	All-time postseason record (2013–2014; 2021)
Totals				7	14	0	All-time regular season and postseason record (2013–2014; 2021)

=== Head coaches records ===
Name	Term	Regular season				Playoffs		Awards
Name	Term	W	L	T	Win%	W	L	Awards
Roy McMillen	2013	7	3	0	.700	0	1	
LaKunta Farmer	2014	0	5	0	.000	0	0	
Mark Stoute	2021	0	5	0	.000	0	0	

== Seasons ==
=== 2013 ===
2013 Kentucky Xtreme season
- Owner: Victor Cole
- General manager: Victor Cole
- Head coach: Roy McMillen
- Home stadium: Freedom Hall

Results
- Record: 7–3
- Division place: 4th
- Playoffs: Lost Semifinal (Explosion) 6–55

==== 2013 standings ====
2013 Continental Indoor Football League
Team	W	L	T	PCT	PF	PA	PF (Avg.)	PA (Avg.)	STK
y-Erie Explosion	10	0	0	1.000	467	218	46.7	21.8	W10
x-Dayton Sharks	8	2	0	.800	478	303	47.8	30.3	L2
x-Saginaw Sting	8	2	0	.800	377	320	37.7	32.0	W3
x-Kentucky Xtreme	7	3	0	.700	497	328	49.7	32.8	W2
Detroit Thunder	4	6	0	.400	282	389	28.2	38.9	L1
Port Huron Patriots	4	6	0	.400	255	336	25.5	33.6	L1
Kentucky Drillers	2	8	0	.200	270	475	27.0	47.5	W1
Marion Blue Racers	2	8	0	.200	317	428	31.7	42.8	W1
Owensboro Rage	5	5	0	.500	195	267	19.5	26.7	L2
Kane County Dawgs^{†}	0	1	0	.000	13	69	13	69	L1

y - clinched home playoff game

x - clinched playoff spot

^{†}Kane County played the second game on their schedule, but forfeited the other nine.

==== 2013 regular season ====
Week	Date	Opponent	Results		Game site
Week	Date	Opponent	Final score	Team record	Game site
1	Bye				
2	February 17	Saginaw Sting	L 33–37	0–1	Freedom Hall
3	Bye				
4	March 1	Kentucky Drillers	W 48–24	1–1	Freedom Hall
5	March 9	at Owensboro Rage	W 70–14	2–1	The Next Level Sports Facility
6	March 15	Owensboro Rage	W 59–30	3–1	Freedom Hall
7	March 24	at Detroit Thunder	W 49–21	4–1	Taylor Sportsplex
8	March 30	at Marion Blue Racers	W 55–47	5–1	Veterans Memorial Coliseum
9	April 7	at Erie Explosion	L 28–32	5–2	Erie Insurance Arena
10	April 14	at Dayton Sharks	L 41–47	5–3	Hara Arena
11	April 21	Marion Blue Racers	W 55–47	6–3	Freedom Hall
12	April 27	Dayton Sharks	W 59–29	7–3	Freedom Hall

==== 2013 playoffs ====
Week	Date	Opponent	Final score	Game site
Final score
CIFL Semifinal	May 5	at Erie Explosion	L 6–55	Erie Insurance Arena

==== 2013 coaching staff ====
2013 Kentucky Xtreme staff
Front office: Founder/owner/general manager – Victor Cole; Head coach - Roy McMillen; Offensive coaches: Quarterbacks – Dave Rooney; Running backs - D.J. Kamer; Offensive coordinator - Roy McMillen/Nick Giordano; Wide receivers – Nick Giordano; Offensive line – Edmund Roberson	Defensive coaches: Defensive coordinator/defensive backs – Roy McMillen; Defensive line – Edmund Roberson; Line backers - LaKunta Farmer; Special teams – D.J. Kamer; Strength and conditioning - D.J. Kamer

==== 2013 final roster ====
2013 Kentucky Xtreme roster
Quarterbacks: 4 Elonzo Scott; 1 Kevin Warner; 17 Jerimy Watson; Running backs: 40 Maurice Grinter; 28 Tony Maddox; Wide receivers: 27 Doug Beaumont; 9 Calvin Ferguson; 7 Juwan Jones; 5 Sergio Spencer; 6 JaJuan Spillman	Offensive linemen: 74 Kent Blackburn; 99 Anthony Richardson; 66 Zac Hemard; Defensive linemen: 90 Marcus Board; 42 Antwan Lawrence; 45 Dustin Noe; 98 Michael Sowell	Linebackers: 23 Stephen Garr; 52 Charles Ricketts; Defensive backs: 11 Quinton Griffin; 8 Ta'Shawn McBroom; 2 Richard Raglin; 25 Johnathan Russell; 21 Jasmon Watkins; Special teams: 86 Micah Canterbury	Reserve lists: Vacant; rookies in italics Roster updated February 19, 2013; 26 Active, 0 Inactive, 0 PS

=== 2014 ===
2014 Kentucky Xtreme season
- Owner: Victor Cole; Mario Urrutia
- General manager: Victor Cole
- Head coach: LaKunta Farmer
- Home stadium: Freedom Hall

Results
- Record: 0–5
- Division place: 5th
- Playoffs: Did not qualify

==== 2014 standings ====
2014 Continental Indoor Football League
Team	Overall				Division			
Team	W	L	T	PCT	W	L	T	PCT
North Division
y-Saginaw Sting	9	1	0	.900	6	1	0	.857
x-Erie Explosion	8	2	0	.800	5	1	0	.833
Chicago Blitz	7	3	0	.700	4	2	0	.667
z-Port Huron Patriots	1	8	0	.111	1	6	0	.143
z-Detroit Thunder	0	8	0	.000	0	6	0	.000
South Division
y-Marion Blue Racers	8	2	0	.800	6	0	0	1.000
x-Northern Kentucky River Monsters	7	3	0	.700	5	2	0	.714
Dayton Sharks	6	4	0	.600	4	3	0	.571
z-Bluegrass Warhorses	1	7	0	.125	1	5	0	.167
z-Kentucky Xtreme	0	5	0	.000	0	4	0	.000

- y - clinched division title
- x - clinched playoff spot
- z - ceased operations during season

==== 2014 regular season schedule ====
Week	Date	Opponent	Results		Game site
Week	Date	Opponent	Final score	Team record	Game site
1	Bye				
2	February 9	at Marion Blue Racers	L 13–69	0–1	Veterans Memorial Coliseum
3	February 17	Chicago Blitz	L 18–52	0–2	Freedom Hall
4	Bye				
5	March 3	Bluegrass Warhorses	L 0–2 (Forfeit)	0–3	Freedom Hall
6	March 9	at Dayton Sharks	L 21–51	0–4	Hara Arena
7	Bye				
8	March 23	Northern Kentucky River Monsters	L 0–2 (Forfeit)	0–5	Freedom Hall
9	March 30	at Chicago Blitz	(Forfeit)		Intra Soccer (Elgin, Illinois)
10	April 5	at Northern Kentucky River Monsters (Note: The River Monsters defeated an affiliate replacement team 70–20.)	(Forfeit)		The Bank of Kentucky Center
11	Bye				
12	April 19	Saginaw Sting	(Forfeit)		Freedom Hall
13	April 27	Dayton Sharks	(Forfeit)		Freedom Hall
14	May 5	at Bluegrass Warhorses	Canceled (Note: Both teams had already ceased operations.)		Alltech Arena

==== 2014 coaching staff ====
2014 Kentucky Xtreme staff
Front office: Founder/owner/general manager – Victor Cole; Co-owner - Mario Urrutia; Head coach - LaKunta Farmer; Offensive coaches: Quarterbacks – Nick Giordano; Running backs - D.J. Kamer; Offensive coordinator - Nick Giordano; Wide receivers – Nick Giordano; Offensive line – Edmund Roberson	Defensive coaches: Defensive coordinator – LaKunta Farmer; Defensive line – Edmund Roberson; Linebackers - Brent Adams; Defensive backs - Derrick Craig; Special teams: Special teams – D.J. Kamer; Strength and conditioning - D.J. Kamer

==== 2014 final roster ====
Kentucky Xtreme roster
Quarterbacks: 1 Kevin Warner; 17 Jerimy Watson; Running backs: 22 Maurice Grinter; 28 Tony Maddox; Wide receivers: 7 Jordan Boykin; 11 Josh Chichester; 14 Chris Spalding; 5 Sergio Spencer; 6 Mario Urrutia	Offensive linemen: 67 Nathan Dirkes; 64 Tyrell Henderson; 99 Anthony Richardson; Defensive linemen: 44 Rodrick Davis; 45 Dustin Noe; 56 Elisee Pompilus; 98 Michael Sowell; Linebackers: 52 Charles Ricketts; 23 Jordan Tennyson	Defensive backs: 3 Dwayne Griffin; 4 Henry Hudson; 12 Gilbert Johnson Jr.; 8 Ta'Shawn McBroom; 2 Richard Raglin; Kickers: 82 Micah Canterbury	Injured reserve: 90 Marcus Board DL (IR); 77 Matt Nally OL (IR); Exempt list: Vacant; rookies in italics; Roster updated February 17, 2014; 24 Active, 2 Inactive

== See also ==
- Sports in Louisville, Kentucky
