= Detroit Thunder =

American professional indoor football team

Logo

General information
- Founded: 2012
- Folded: 2014
- Headquartered: Fraser Hockeyland in Fraser, Michigan
- Colors: Purple, Green, White

Personnel
- Owners: Terrence and Lawrence Foster
- General manager: Terrence Foster
- Head coach: Terrence Foster

Team history
- Detroit Thunder (2013–2014)

Home fields
- Fraser Hockeyland (2014)

League / conference affiliations
- Continental Indoor Football League (2013–2014): North Division (2014)

The Detroit Thunder was a professional indoor football team based in Fraser, Michigan. The team was a member of the Continental Indoor Football League. The Thunder were the third indoor football team to have called the Motor City home, following two Arena Football League teams: the four-time ArenaBowl champion Detroit Drive (1988–1993) and the Detroit Fury (2001–2004). In addition, a team called the Motor City Reapers was proposed for the 2007 CIFL season, but the team folded before ever playing a single game. The Thunder were owned by Terrence and Lawrence Foster.

== Franchise history ==
=== 2013 ===
On November 1, 2012, the Thunder was officially announced as the CIFL's eleventh team for the 2013 season, but with the Cincinnati Commandos folding, the league was left with ten teams. The team was owned by David and Cynthia Kinsman, who also own the Port Huron Patriots in the same league. In addition, the Michigan Cup was announces as the trophy the Thunder, Patriots, and Saginaw Sting would compete for during the 2013 season. On November 9, 2012, David Kinsman announced that the Thunder would be playing their home games at the Taylor Sportsplex in Taylor, Michigan for the 2013 season, with the hopes to move to a larger venue in 2014. In the Thunder's first ever game, the team lost 28–41 to the Patriots. Kinsman moved the Thunder home games to McMorran Arena in Port Huron, Michigan for the remainder of the season. On February 21, just two weeks into the season, Kinsman sold both the Patriots and the Thunder. The Thunder were backed by the CIFL until a new owner was found. Less than a week after the CIFL took over the operations, the Thunder were sold to coaches Terrence and Lawrence Foster. Foster's move as head coach was moving the team back to the Taylor Sportsplex.

=== 2014 ===
In June 2013, the Thunder agreed to terms with the CIFL to return for the 2014 season. The Thunder opened up the 2014 season at the Patriots, who during the offseason signed former Thunder quarterback Mike Akwari. Akwari helped the Patriots defeat his old team by a score of 34-12.

Turf problems at Fraser Hockeyland, the arena the team originally intended to use in 2014, disrupted the season. After moving their first home game to the Perani Arena and Event Center, the team attempted to return to Fraser Hockeyland for the remainder of its home schedule. The Erie Explosion, the first team that would have played the Thunder at Fraser Hockeyland, arrived at the arena only to find that the turf was unfit for play, forcing the Thunder to forfeit; the team ceased operations for the season after that incident.

== Awards and honors ==
The following is a list of all Detroit Thunder players who won league awards

Season	Player	Position	Award
2013	Andre Thomas	DL	1st Team All-CIFL
2013	Reggie Eubanks	WR	2nd Team All-CIFL
2013	Richard Gedelian	OL	2nd Team All-CIFL
2013	Doug Emery	LB	2nd Team All-CIFL

== Head coaches ==
Name	Term	Regular season				Playoffs		Awards
Name	Term	W	L	T	Win%	W	L	Awards
Terrence Foster	2013–2014	4	14	0	.222	0	0	

== Season-by-season results ==
League champions	Conference champions	Division champions	Wild card berth	League leader

Season	Team	League	Conference	Division	Regular season				Postseason results
Season	Team	League	Conference	Division	Finish	Wins	Losses	Ties	Postseason results
2013	2013	CIFL			5th	4	6	0	
2014	2014	CIFL		North	5th	0	8	0	
Totals						4	14	0	All-time regular season record (2013-2014)
Totals						0	0	-	All-time postseason record (2013-2014)
Totals						4	14	0	All-time regular season and postseason record (2013-2014)
