= 2013 Erie Explosion season =

- Owner: Bill Stafford
- General manager: Shawn Liotta
- Head coach: Shawn Liotta
- Home stadium: Erie Insurance Arena

Results
- Record: 10-0
- Division place: 1st
- Playoffs: Won CIFL Championship Game (vs. Saginaw Sting) 37-36

The 2013 Erie Explosion season was the 7th season for the Continental Indoor Football League (CIFL) franchise.

The Explosion left the United Indoor Football League after the 2012 season. The team remained idle for about a month, while fielding offers to join four different leagues. Owner Bill Stafford ultimately decided to join the Continental Indoor Football League.

The Explosion accrued a perfect season in their first year in the CIFL, winning all ten regular season games (one of which was played against the semi-pro Flint Fury after the Owensboro Rage failed toward the end of the season) and defeated the Saginaw Sting in the CIFL Championship Game.

== Roster ==
2013 Erie Explosion roster
Quarterbacks: 3 Aaron Smetanka; 10 Darmel Whitfield; Running backs: 13 Richard Stokes; Wide receivers: -- DeAndre Green; 1 Alfonso Hoggard; 8 Terry Jackson; -- Michael Johnson; 6 Andre London; -- Javon Rowan	Offensive linemen: -- Taofik Amokomowo; 75 George Frisch; 52 Marcus Gordon; 55 Dave McQuiston; -- Brannon Pate; 51 Skylar Trimble; Defensive linemen: -- Chad Brooks; 99 Bob Hammer; 9 Andre Portis; -- Jackson Tolle; 12 Zach Williams; Linebackers: 24 Jon D'Angelo; -- Marquis Kirkland	Defensive backs: 7 Brandon Clarke; -- Dustin Craig; -- Ashton Jones; 17 Ricardo Kemp; 11 Brandon McElwee; -- Jayson Nickson; 21 Kwaheem Smith; -- Maleek Toran; 2 Sean White; -- Jake Wickline; Kickers: 14 Shon Rowser	Injured reserve: currently vacant; Exempt list: currently vacant; Practice squad: currently vacant; rookies in italics; Roster updated February 19, 2013; 32 Active, 0 Inactive, 0 PS

== Schedule ==
=== Regular season ===
Week	Date	Kickoff	Opponent	Results		Game site
Week	Date	Kickoff	Opponent	Final score	Team record	Game site
1	Bye					
2	February 16	7:00 P.M. EST	at Marion Blue Racers	W 42-40	1-0	Veterans Memorial Coliseum
3	February 24	4:00 P.M. EST	at Detroit Thunder	W 64-27	2-0	Taylor Sportsplex
4	March 3	2:00 P.M. EST	Kane County Dawgs	W 69-13	3-0	Erie Insurance Arena
5	March 10	2:00 P.M. EST	Marion Blue Racers	W 45-13	4-0	Erie Insurance Arena
6	Bye					
7	March 24	4:00 P.M. EST	at Kentucky Drillers	W 79-26	5-0	Eastern Kentucky Expo Center
8	March 29	7:30 p.m. EST	at Saginaw Sting	W 52-20	6-0	Dow Event Center
9	April 7	2:00 P.M. EST	Kentucky Xtreme	W 32-28	7-0	Erie Insurance Arena
10	April 14	2:00 P.M. EST	Detroit Thunder	W 61-37	8-0	Erie Insurance Arena
11	April 20	7:30 p.m. EST	at Dayton Sharks	W 21-14	9-0	Hara Arena
12	April 28	2:00 p.m. EST	Flint Fury	W 95-0	10-0	Erie Insurance Arena

=== Standings ===
2013 Continental Indoor Football League
Team	W	L	T	PCT	PF	PA	PF (Avg.)	PA (Avg.)	STK
y-Erie Explosion	10	0	0	1.000	467	218	46.7	21.8	W10
x-Dayton Sharks	8	2	0	.800	478	303	47.8	30.3	L2
x-Saginaw Sting	8	2	0	.800	377	320	37.7	32.0	W3
x-Kentucky Xtreme	7	3	0	.700	497	328	49.7	32.8	W2
Detroit Thunder	4	6	0	.400	282	389	28.2	38.9	L1
Port Huron Patriots	4	6	0	.400	255	336	25.5	33.6	L1
Kentucky Drillers	2	8	0	.200	270	475	27.0	47.5	W1
Marion Blue Racers	2	8	0	.200	317	428	31.7	42.8	W1
Owensboro Rage	5	5	0	.500	195	267	19.5	26.7	L2
Kane County Dawgs^{†}	0	1	0	.000	13	69	13	69	L1

y - clinched home playoff game

x - clinched playoff spot

^{†}Kane County played the second game on their schedule, but forfeited the other nine.

=== Postseason ===
Round	Date	Kickoff	Opponent	Results		Game site
Round	Date	Kickoff	Opponent	Final score	Team record	Game site
Semi-Finals	May 5	2:00 P.M. EST	Kentucky Xtreme	W 55-6	1-0	Erie Insurance Arena
CIFL Championship Game	May 12	2:00 P.M. EST	Saginaw Sting	W 37-36	2-0	Erie Insurance Arena

== Coaching staff ==
2013 Erie Explosion staff
Front office: Director of operations – Bill Stafford; Marketing – Sarah Lander; Director of Sales - Shawn Struble; Director of Player Personnel- Jeremy Liotta Head coach: Head coach – Shawn Liotta; Offensive coaches: Offensive coordinator – Shawn Liotta	Defensive coaches: Defensive coordinator – Jeremy Liotta; Defensive backs – Sam Reynolds; Defensive assistant - Kirk Rearick Special teams coaches: Special Teams Coordinator - Ed Martin
