= 2013 Port Huron Patriots season =

- Owner: Jude Carter
- General manager: Jude Carter
- Head coach: Demar Cranford
- Home stadium: McMorran Arena

Results
- Record: 4–6
- Division place: 6th
- Playoffs: Did not qualify

Uniform
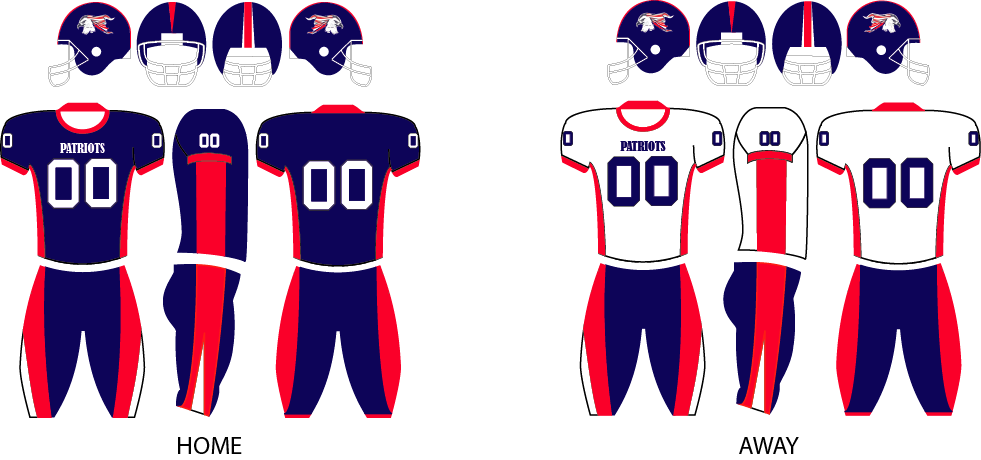

The 2013 Port Huron Patriots season was the second season for the Continental Indoor Football League (CIFL) franchise. The Patriots kicked off their exhibition schedule with a 62–2 victory over the Michigan Renegades, a semi-professional outdoor football team.

== Roster ==
Port Huron Patriots roster
Quarterbacks: 21 James Terry; Running backs: 25 David Hill; Wide receivers: 10 Anthony Bowman; 88 Josh Goodnough; 80 Chris Kolokitas; 3 Jose Morris	Offensive linemen: -- Chuck Cobb; Defensive linemen: 9 Dwayne Homes; 99 Daniel Johnson; 15 Darryn Moore; Linebackers: 2 Clifton Jackson	Defensive backs: 4 Michael McKinley; 23 Nicholas Thompson; 38 David Smith; 37 Ernie Smith; Kickers: 59 Logan Mitseff	Injured reserve: currently vacant; Exempt list: currently vacant; Practice squad: currently vacant; rookies in italics; Roster updated November 12, 2012; 14 Active, 0 Inactive, 0 PS

== Schedule ==
=== Regular season ===
Week	Date	Kickoff	Opponent	Results		Game site
Week	Date	Kickoff	Opponent	Final score	Team record	Game site
1	February 9	7:30 P.M. EST	Detroit Thunder	W 41–20	1–0	McMorran Arena
2	February 15	7:30 P.M. EST	at Dayton Sharks	L 16–64	1–1	Hara Arena
3	February 23	7:30 P.M. EST	Sagniaw Sting	L 27–50	1–2	McMorran Arena
4	Bye					
5	Bye					
6	March 17	4:00 P.M. EST	at Detroit Thunder	L 35–42	1–3	Taylor Sportsplex
7	March 23	7:30 P.M. EST	Kane County Dawgs	W 2–0	2–3	McMorran Arena
8	March 30	2:00 p.m. CST	at Kane County Dawgs	W 2–0	3–3	Canlan Ice Sports Arena
9	April 6	7:30 P.M. EST	Dayton Sharks	L 35–38	3–4	McMorran Arena
10	April 13	7:30 P.M. EST	at Saginaw Sting	L 28–49	3–5	Dow Event Center
11	April 20	7:30 p.m. EST	Kentucky Drillers	W 46–31	4–5	McMorran Arena
12	April 27	7:00 p.m. EST	at Marion Blue Racers	L 22–23	4–6	Veterans Memorial Coliseum

=== Standings ===
2013 Continental Indoor Football League
Team	W	L	T	PCT	PF	PA	PF (Avg.)	PA (Avg.)	STK
y-Erie Explosion	10	0	0	1.000	467	218	46.7	21.8	W10
x-Dayton Sharks	8	2	0	.800	478	303	47.8	30.3	L2
x-Saginaw Sting	8	2	0	.800	377	320	37.7	32.0	W3
x-Kentucky Xtreme	7	3	0	.700	497	328	49.7	32.8	W2
Detroit Thunder	4	6	0	.400	282	389	28.2	38.9	L1
Port Huron Patriots	4	6	0	.400	255	336	25.5	33.6	L1
Kentucky Drillers	2	8	0	.200	270	475	27.0	47.5	W1
Marion Blue Racers	2	8	0	.200	317	428	31.7	42.8	W1
Owensboro Rage	5	5	0	.500	195	267	19.5	26.7	L2
Kane County Dawgs^{†}	0	1	0	.000	13	69	13	69	L1

y - clinched home playoff game

x - clinched playoff spot

^{†}Kane County played the second game on their schedule, but forfeited the other nine.

== Coaching staff ==
2013 Port Huron Patriots staff
Front office: Co-Owner/General Manager – Jude Carter; Co-Owner – Lonnie Nichols; Co-Owner – Lance Nichols; Co-Owner – David Nichols; Co-Owner – Larry Page; Co-Owner – Matt Wuchte; Co-Owner – Nick Kennedy-Saura; Game Day Coordinator - Lori Jones; Head coach: Head coach – Demar Cranford; Offensive coaches: Offensive line/offensive coordinator – Darrel Rich	Defensive coaches: Defensive coordinator – Larry Page; Defensive Line/Asst. Defensive Coordinator – Darrel Rich; Special teams coaches: Special Teams Coordinator -
