= 2013 Marion Blue Racers season =

- Owner: LaMonte and Shavonne Coleman
- General manager: LaMonte Coleman
- Head coach: Martino Theus (fired March 14: 1-4 record); Marc Huddleston (interim)
- Home stadium: Veterans Memorial Coliseum; 220 East Fairground Street; Marion, OH 43302

Results
- Record: 2–8
- League place: 8th
- Playoffs: did not qualify

The 2013 Marion Blue Racers season is the third season for the Continental Indoor Football League (CIFL) franchise.

The Blue Racers announced they would be leaving the UIFL following the conclusion of the 2012 season. A few days later, the franchise returned to the CIFL. On September 18, 2012, the Blue Racers named CEO and General Manager LaMonte Coleman as the team's fifth head coach in franchise history. Three weeks prior to the season's start, offensive coordinator Martino Theus was promoted to head coach.

Every home game of the 2013 season will be shown on WMNO Marion TV 22, available via broadcast on UHF channel 22 and on Time Warner Cable channel 3 (Marion only).

== Roster ==
2013 Marion Blue Racers roster
Quarterbacks: 2 Brian Harris; 5 James Moreland; Offensive backs: 6 Maurice Douse; Wide receivers: 23 Nate Ford; 4 Marc Huddleston; 15 Maurice Jones; 25 Danny Keenan; 80 LaRoi Johnson TE; 28 Deanco Oliver; 8 Jeremy Satchel; 9 Abrielle Taylor	Offensive linemen: 50 J. T. Haynes; 75 Robert Price; 70 Demitri Visvardis; Defensive linemen: 99 Mike Cross; 90 Curtis McGhee; 11 Thomas McKenzie	Linebackers: 88 William Haase; 33 Raymond Saunders; 34 Author Smith; Defensive backs: 10 Chris Crayton; 24 Brandon Davies; 27 Wesley Edwards; 21 Bryceson Lawrence; Kickers: 14 Seth Burkholder	Injured reserve: currently vacant; Exempt list: currently vacant; Practice squad: currently vacant; rookies in italics; Roster updated March 22, 2013; 25 Active, 0 Inactive, 0 PS

== Schedule ==
=== Regular season ===
Week	Date	Kickoff	Opponent	Results		Game site
Week	Date	Kickoff	Opponent	Final score	Team record	Game site
1	February 8	7:30 P.M. EST	at Saginaw Sting	L 28-49	0-1	Dow Event Center
2	February 16	7:00 P.M. EST	Erie Explosion	L 40-42	0-2	Veterans Memorial Coliseum
3	February 23	7:00 P.M. EST	at Kane County Dawgs	W 2-0 (forfeit)	1-2	Seven Bridges Ice Arena
4	March 2	7:00 P.M. EST	Dayton Sharks	L 28-47	1-3	Veterans Memorial Coliseum
5	March 10	2:00 P.M. EST	at Erie Explosion	L 13-45	1-4	Erie Insurance Arena
6	Bye					
7	March 23	7:00 P.M. EST	Owensboro Rage	L 38-39	1-5	Veterans Memorial Coliseum
8	March 30	7:00 p.m. EST	Kentucky Extreme	L 47-55	1-6	Veterans Memorial Coliseum
9	Bye					
10	April 13	7:30 P.M. EST	at Kentucky Drillers	L 51-74	1-7	Eastern Kentucky Expo Center
11	April 21	4:00 p.m. EST	at Kentucky Extreme	L 47-55	1-8	Freedom Hall
12	April 27	7:00 p.m. EST	Port Huron Patriots	W 23-22	2-8	Veterans Memorial Coliseum

=== Standings ===
2013 Continental Indoor Football League
Team	W	L	T	PCT	PF	PA	PF (Avg.)	PA (Avg.)	STK
y-Erie Explosion	10	0	0	1.000	467	218	46.7	21.8	W10
x-Dayton Sharks	8	2	0	.800	478	303	47.8	30.3	L2
x-Saginaw Sting	8	2	0	.800	377	320	37.7	32.0	W3
x-Kentucky Xtreme	7	3	0	.700	497	328	49.7	32.8	W2
Detroit Thunder	4	6	0	.400	282	389	28.2	38.9	L1
Port Huron Patriots	4	6	0	.400	255	336	25.5	33.6	L1
Kentucky Drillers	2	8	0	.200	270	475	27.0	47.5	W1
Marion Blue Racers	2	8	0	.200	317	428	31.7	42.8	W1
Owensboro Rage	5	5	0	.500	195	267	19.5	26.7	L2
Kane County Dawgs^{†}	0	1	0	.000	13	69	13	69	L1

y - clinched home playoff game

x - clinched playoff spot

^{†}Kane County played the second game on their schedule, but forfeited the other nine.

== Coaching staff ==
2013 Marion Blue Racers staff
Front office: CEO/General Manager – LaMonte Coleman; CFO/Owner – Shavonne Coleman; Assistant general manager and vice president of operations – Ryan Sawyer; Director of Design & Graphics – Justin Boyd; Head coach: Head coach – LaMonte Coleman; Offensive coaches: Offensive coordinator – Brandon Ikard; Running Backs - Open; Wide receivers – Open; Offensive line –	Defensive coaches: Defensive coordinator – LaMonte Coleman; Defensive line –; Linebackers – Open; Secondary – Open
