= 2013 Owensboro Rage season =

- Owner: Melissa Logsdon
- General manager: Kory White
- Head coach: Mike Goodpaster
- Home stadium: The Next Level Sports Facility

Results
- Record: 5–5
- Division place: Tied 4th
- Playoffs: Did not qualify

The 2013 Owensboro Rage season was the second and final season for the Continental Indoor Football League (CIFL) franchise.

On July 13, 2012, owner and general manager Eddie Cronin died in an automobile accident. On August 8, 2012, the Rage confirmed that they would continue to be a part of the CIFL again in 2013, with Cronin's fiancé, Melissa Logsdon running the team. The season will be dedicated to Cronin. On September 27, 2012, Logsdon announced that the team would be moving to Owensboro, Kentucky. The Rage also named Kory White as General Manager the same day. The Rage signed former Louisville quarterback Bill Ashburn as well as former Arena Football League wide receiver Robert Redd to get the team's offense going.

After starting off 2–0, the Rage lost three straight games. To help the floundering team, the Rage signed Jared Lorenzen to help solidify the quarterback position. Lorenzen helped the Rage instantly by helping the Rage win a close game with the Marion Blue Racers. The Rage received two automatic victories from the folding of the Kane County Dawgs, bringing their record to 5–3, but with two games remaining in the season, the Rage suspended operations due to lack of funds. The Rage forfeited their final two games of the season, making their record 5–5.

== Roster ==
Owensboro Rage roster
Quarterbacks: 13 Austin Johnson; 22 Jared Lorenzen; Running backs: 37 John Jackson; 20 Kyle Osborne; Wide receivers: 80 Derek Brown; 4 Fred Cromartie; 85 Grant Dugan; 11 DaMarcus Ganaway; 89 Maurice Jones; 22 Dray Mason	Offensive linemen: 70 Jordan Cook; 78 Trent Marlow; 59 Ryan Wheat; Defensive linemen: 47 Justin Blosser; 54 Rodney Morris; 89 Caleb Brown; 9 Anthony Rouba	Linebackers: 38 Blake Harris; 2 David James; 5 Quadarius Wallace; Defensive backs: 21 Ray Everhart; 3 Gilbert E. Johnson; 24 Hakim Thomas; Kickers: 6 Brian Jessen	Injured reserve: currently vacant; Exempt list: currently vacant; Practice squad: currently vacant; rookies in italics Roster updated January 28, 2013; 24 Active, 0 Inactive, 0 PS

== Schedule ==
=== Regular season ===
Week	Date	Kickoff	Opponent	Results		Game site
Week	Date	Kickoff	Opponent	Final score	Team record	Game site
1	February 8	7:00 P.M. CST	Kentucky Drillers	W 52–18	1–0	The Next Level Sports Facility
2	February 18	7:00 P.M. EST	at Kentucky Drillers	W 42–24	2–0	Eastern Kentucky Expo Center
3	February 22	7:00 P.M. CST	Dayton Sharks	L 14–54	2–1	The Next Level Sports Facility
4	Bye					
5	March 9	7:00 P.M. CST	Kentucky Xtreme	L 14–70	2–2	The Next Level Sports Facility
6	March 15	7:30 P.M. EST	at Kentucky Xtreme	L 30–59	2–3	Freedom Hall
7	March 23	7:00 P.M. EST	at Marion Blue Racers	W 39–38	3–3	Veterans Memorial Coliseum
8	Bye					
9	April 6	7:00 P.M. CST	Kane County Dawgs	W 2–0	4–3	The Next Level Sports Facility
10	April 13	7:00 P.M. CST	at Kane County Dawgs	W 2–0	5–3	Canlan Ice Sports Arena
11	April 20	7:00 p.m. CST	Detroit Thunder	L 0–2	5–4	The Next Level Sports Facility
12	April 28	2:00 p.m. EST	at Erie Explosion	L 0–2	5–5	Erie Insurance Arena

=== Standings ===
2013 Continental Indoor Football League
Team	W	L	T	PCT	PF	PA	PF (Avg.)	PA (Avg.)	STK
y-Erie Explosion	10	0	0	1.000	467	218	46.7	21.8	W10
x-Dayton Sharks	8	2	0	.800	478	303	47.8	30.3	L2
x-Saginaw Sting	8	2	0	.800	377	320	37.7	32.0	W3
x-Kentucky Xtreme	7	3	0	.700	497	328	49.7	32.8	W2
Detroit Thunder	4	6	0	.400	282	389	28.2	38.9	L1
Port Huron Patriots	4	6	0	.400	255	336	25.5	33.6	L1
Kentucky Drillers	2	8	0	.200	270	475	27.0	47.5	W1
Marion Blue Racers	2	8	0	.200	317	428	31.7	42.8	W1
Owensboro Rage	5	5	0	.500	195	267	19.5	26.7	L2
Kane County Dawgs^{†}	0	1	0	.000	13	69	13	69	L1

y - clinched home playoff game

x - clinched playoff spot

^{†}Kane County played the second game on their schedule, but forfeited the other nine.

== Coaching staff ==
2013 Owensboro Rage staff
Front office: Owner – Melissa Logsdon; General manager – Kory White; Director of football operations – Mike Goodpaster; Director of marketing and sponsorship – Sam Meny; Director of Media Relations – Chris Cooke; Director of Social Media – Stacey Williams; Director of Ticket & Sales Marketing – Erin White; Dance Team Coordinator – Brianna Reed	Head coach: Head coach – Mike Goodpaster; Offensive coaches: Offensive coordinator – Mike Goodpaster; Running Backs – Michael Cosey; Offensive line – Trent Marlow; Wide Receivers – Dan Grass; Defensive coaches: Defensive coordinator – Steve Freshwater; Linebackers/Secondary – Tony Bass; Special teams coaches: Special Teams Coordinator – Michael Cosey
