= 2013 Kentucky Drillers season =

- Owner: Rick Kranz
- General manager: Rick Kranz
- Head coach: Rick Kranz
- Home stadium: Eastern Kentucky Expo Center

Results
- Record: 2–8
- Division place: 7th
- Playoffs: Did not qualify

The 2013 Kentucky Drillers season was the third season for the Continental Indoor Football League (CIFL) franchise.

On July 19, 2012, it was announced that the Drillers would leave the UIFL and join the Continental Indoor Football League, as well as change their name to the Kentucky Drillers.

== Roster ==
Kentucky Drillers roster
| Quarterbacks: 5 Kameron Bryant; Running backs: 34 Derek Dickerson; Wide receivers: 18 Eric Foxworth; 1 Kelvin Irving; 6 Isiah Thomas; 9 Perry Wright; 80 Ronnie Brown Jr | Offensive linemen: 92 Antuan Baker; 60 Jesse Carmon; 70 Kyle MacCarthy; 79 Josh Puckett; Defensive linemen: 44 Rodrick Davis; 98 Jerimah Fennel; 69 Brandon Lee | Linebackers: 55 Jarell Dennis; 2 Phillip Sumlin; Defensive backs: 8 Ron Burgess; 3 Chris Dickerson; 23 James Houston; 4 Jamell Mingo; 21 Troy Smith; Kickers: 14 Caleb Petry | Injured reserve: currently vacant; Exempt list: currently vacant; Practice squad: currently vacant; rookies in italics; Roster updated April 20, 2013; 21 Active, 0 Inactive, 0 PS |

== Schedule ==
=== Regular season ===
| Week | Date | Kickoff | Opponent | Results | | Game site |
| Week | Date | Kickoff | Opponent | Final score | Team record | Game site |
|---|---|---|---|---|---|---|
| 1 | February 8 | 7:00 P.M. CST | at Owensboro Rage | L 18–52 | 0–1 | The Next Level Sports Facility |
| 2 | February 18 | 7:00 P.M. EST | Owensboro Rage | L 24–42 | 0–2 | Eastern Kentucky Expo Center |
| 3 | Bye | | | | | |
| 4 | March 1 | 7:30 P.M. EST | at Kentucky Xtreme | L 24–48 | 0–3 | Freedom Hall |
| 5 | March 10 | 2:00 P.M. EST | Dayton Sharks | L 35–62 | 0–4 | Eastern Kentucky Expo Center |
| 6 | March 17 | 4:00 P.M. EST | at Dayton Sharks | L 12–55 | 0–5 | Hara Arena |
| 7 | March 24 | 4:00 P.M. EST | Erie Explosion | L 26–79 | 0–6 | Eastern Kentucky Expo Center |
| 8 | Bye | | | | | |
| 9 | April 6 | 7:30 P.M. EST | Detroit Thunder | L 24–40 | 0–7 | Eastern Kentucky Expo Center |
| 10 | April 13 | 7:30 P.M. CST | Marion Blue Racers | W 74–51 | 1–7 | Eastern Kentucky Expo Center |
| 11 | April 20 | 7:30 p.m. EST | at Port Huron Patriots | L 31–46 | 1–8 | McMorran Arena |
| 12 | April 27 | 7:00 p.m. CST | at Kane County Dawgs | W 2–0 | 2–8 | Canlan Ice Sports Arena |

=== Standings ===
2013 Continental Indoor Football League
| Team | W | L | T | PCT | PF | PA | PF (Avg.) | PA (Avg.) | STK |
|---|---|---|---|---|---|---|---|---|---|
| y-Erie Explosion | 10 | 0 | 0 | 1.000 | 467 | 218 | 46.7 | 21.8 | W10 |
| x-Dayton Sharks | 8 | 2 | 0 | .800 | 478 | 303 | 47.8 | 30.3 | L2 |
| x-Saginaw Sting | 8 | 2 | 0 | .800 | 377 | 320 | 37.7 | 32.0 | W3 |
| x-Kentucky Xtreme | 7 | 3 | 0 | .700 | 497 | 328 | 49.7 | 32.8 | W2 |
| Detroit Thunder | 4 | 6 | 0 | .400 | 282 | 389 | 28.2 | 38.9 | L1 |
| Port Huron Patriots | 4 | 6 | 0 | .400 | 255 | 336 | 25.5 | 33.6 | L1 |
| Kentucky Drillers | 2 | 8 | 0 | .200 | 270 | 475 | 27.0 | 47.5 | W1 |
| Marion Blue Racers | 2 | 8 | 0 | .200 | 317 | 428 | 31.7 | 42.8 | W1 |
| Owensboro Rage | 5 | 5 | 0 | .500 | 195 | 267 | 19.5 | 26.7 | L2 |
| Kane County Dawgs^{†} | 0 | 1 | 0 | .000 | 13 | 69 | 13 | 69 | L1 |

y - clinched home playoff game

x - clinched playoff spot

^{†}Kane County played the second game on their schedule, but forfeited the other nine.

== Coaching staff ==
Kentucky Drillers staff
| Front office: Owner/President/Director of Football Oppoerations - Rick Kranz; Community Relations - Charles Stephens; Executive Assistant - Angela McGinnis; Marketing Executive - Stephanie McKinney; Director of Player Personnel - Trey Randall; Head coach: Head coach – Rick Kranz; Offensive coaches: Offensive Coordinator –; Quarterbacks/Running Backs/Wide Receivers - Clyde Harrison; Offensive line – Stan Wrubluski | Defensive coaches: Defensive coordinator – Jimmy Brookins; Defensive Line - Stan Wrubluski; Linebackers –; Secondary –; Special teams coaches: Special teams coordinator – Clyde Harrison |
