= 2013 Kane County Dawgs season =

- Owner: Mike Dortch & Macey Brooks
- General manager: Mike Dortch
- Head coach: Matt Griebel
- Home stadium: Seven Bridges Ice Arena

Results
- Record: 0-10
- Division place: 10th
- Playoffs: Did not qualify

The 2013 Kane County Dawgs season was a short-lived season for the Continental Indoor Football League (CIFL) franchise.

The franchise was originally to be called the DeKalb Dawgs, and were to play in the American Professional Football League in 2013, before announcing that they would be joining the Continental Indoor Football League as its tenth member in October 2012. On October 10, 2012, the franchise announced that former National Football League and Arena Football League player Matt Griebel was named the team's first head coach. The team also announced that they would be playing their home games at the Seven Bridges Ice Arena in Woodridge, Illinois.

After having the first two weeks of the season off with a bye weeks, the Dawgs forfeit their first game, when the turf they purchased did not adequately fit the Seven Bridges Ice Arena. The following week, the Dawgs would lose their first ever played game in franchise history, with a 13-69 loss to the Erie Explosion.

The loss to the Explosion, would end up being the team's only game, as the following week the league announced on their website that the Dawgs franchise was "indefinitely suspending operations" to protect the integrity of the league. Players and coaches were all released and free to sign with other teams in the CIFL or elsewhere.

== Roster ==
Kane County Dawgs roster
| Quarterbacks: 7 Rodney Brown; 11 Mosely Haven; 5 Demetrius Jones; Running backs: 33 Greg Owens; Wide receivers: 12 Michael Leaks; 3 Nathan Lohmann; 4 Tom McGinnis; 2 Brian Miles; 10 Adrian Perez | Offensive linemen: 53 A. J. Adams; 64 Daniel Broom; 71 Anthony Bullock; 55 Prenny Stokes; Defensive linemen: 47 Eugene Beard; 16 Fred Blue; 50 Christian Daigre; 85 D. J. Grayson; Linebackers: 23 Tim Jarvis | Defensive backs: 22 Maxwell Frempong; 1 Bryon Jackson; 14 Antwain Jones; 44 Bobby Miller; 8 Mike Thornton; 6 Sinque Turner; Kickers: 99 Julie Harshbarger | Injured Reserve: currently vacant; Exempt List: currently vacant; Practice squad: currently vacant; rookies in italics; Roster updated February 23, 2013; 25 Active, 0 Inactive, 0 PS |

== Schedule ==
=== Regular season ===
| Week | Date | Kickoff | Opponent | Results | | Game site |
| Week | Date | Kickoff | Opponent | Final score | Team record | Game site |
|---|---|---|---|---|---|---|
| 1 | Bye | | | | | |
| 2 | Bye | | | | | |
| 3 | February 23 | 7:00 P.M. CST | Marion Blue Racers | L 0-2 (forfeit) | 0-1 | Seven Bridges Ice Arena |
| 4 | March 3 | 2:00 P.M. EST | at Erie Explosion | L 13-69 | 0-2 | Erie Insurance Arena |
| 5 | March 10 | 4:00 P.M. EST | at Detroit Thunder | L 0-2 (forfeit) | 0-3 | McMorran Arena |
| 6 | March 18 | 7:00 P.M. EST | at Saginaw Sting | L 0-2 (forfeit) | 0-4 | Dow Event Center |
| 7 | March 23 | 7:30 P.M. EST | at Port Huron Patriots | L 0-2 (forfeit) | 0-5 | McMorran Arena |
| 8 | March 30 | 7:00 p.m. CST | Port Huron Patriots | L 0-2 (forfeit) | 0-6 | Seven Bridges Ice Arena |
| 9 | April 6 | 7:00 P.M. CST | at Owensboro Rage | L 0-2 (forfeit) | 0-7 | The Next Level Sports Facility |
| 10 | April 13 | 7:00 P.M. CST | Owensboro Rage | L 0-2 (forfeit) | 0-8 | Seven Bridges Ice Arena |
| 11 | April 21 | 6:30 p.m. CST | Saginaw Sting | L 0-2 (forfeit) | 0-9 | Seven Bridges Ice Arena |
| 12 | April 28 | 4:00 p.m. CST | Kentucky Drillers | L 0-2 (forfeit) | 0-10 | Seven Bridges Ice Arena |

=== Standings ===
2013 Continental Indoor Football League
| Team | W | L | T | PCT | PF | PA | PF (Avg.) | PA (Avg.) | STK |
|---|---|---|---|---|---|---|---|---|---|
| y-Erie Explosion | 10 | 0 | 0 | 1.000 | 467 | 218 | 46.7 | 21.8 | W10 |
| x-Dayton Sharks | 8 | 2 | 0 | .800 | 478 | 303 | 47.8 | 30.3 | L2 |
| x-Saginaw Sting | 8 | 2 | 0 | .800 | 377 | 320 | 37.7 | 32.0 | W3 |
| x-Kentucky Xtreme | 7 | 3 | 0 | .700 | 497 | 328 | 49.7 | 32.8 | W2 |
| Detroit Thunder | 4 | 6 | 0 | .400 | 282 | 389 | 28.2 | 38.9 | L1 |
| Port Huron Patriots | 4 | 6 | 0 | .400 | 255 | 336 | 25.5 | 33.6 | L1 |
| Kentucky Drillers | 2 | 8 | 0 | .200 | 270 | 475 | 27.0 | 47.5 | W1 |
| Marion Blue Racers | 2 | 8 | 0 | .200 | 317 | 428 | 31.7 | 42.8 | W1 |
| Owensboro Rage | 5 | 5 | 0 | .500 | 195 | 267 | 19.5 | 26.7 | L2 |
| Kane County Dawgs^{†} | 0 | 1 | 0 | .000 | 13 | 69 | 13 | 69 | L1 |

y - clinched home playoff game

x - clinched playoff spot

^{†}Kane County played the second game on their schedule, but forfeited the other nine.

== Coaching staff ==
2013 Kane County Dawgs staff
| Front office: Director of Football Operations - Vernard Alsberry; Director of Front Office Operations - Bri Dortch; Director of Gameday Operations - Zach Tolliver | Head coach: Head coach – Matt Griebel; Offensive coaches: Offensive coordinator – Nick Lago; Wide receivers – Macey Brooks; Defensive coaches: Defensive coordinator – Rob Williams; Defensive line – Anthony Purvis; Special teams: Special Teams Asst. Coach – Chris Lago |
