= 2009 Saginaw Sting season =

Season of American indoor football

- Owner: Mike Trumbull; Esteban Rivera
- Head coach: Karl Featherstone (resigned on April 8; 2–2 record); Jason Lovelock (interim)
- Home stadium: Dow Event Center; 303 Johnson Street; Saginaw, MI 78607

Results
- Record: 3–12
- Division place: 4th
- Playoffs: did not qualify

The 2009 Saginaw Sting season was the 2nd season for the American Indoor Football League franchise. A number of Sting and Xplosion players indicated at the end of the 2008 season that wages were in arrears from the owners. This led to an investigation of Johnson in his role as Sting general manager. Trumbull, owner of Triple Threat Sports in Battle Creek, and Rivera, a Battle Creek police officer, have offered a deal to split ownership of the two teams, with Trumbell and Rivera owning the Sting, and Johnson receiving the Xplosion. Trumbull and Rivera have indicated that they plan for the Sting to move to the new Indoor Football League. The Sting looked to have put together a promising team with the re-signing of QB Damon Dowdell, and signing 2007 CIFL MVP, WR/RB Robert Height, but the team fared poorly on the field in the IFL. After a 2-2 start to the season, head coach Karl Featherstone resigned from his position and assistant Jason Lovelock took over as interim head coach.

== Schedule ==
Week	Day	Date	Opponent	Results		Location
Week	Day	Date	Opponent	Score	Record	Location
1	Friday	March 13	at Muskegon Thunder	W 16–9	1–0	L. C. Walker Arena
2	Friday	March 20	RiverCity Rage	L 41–55	1–1	Dow Event Center
3	Sunday	March 29	Rochester Raiders	W 38–30	2–1	Dow Event Center
4	Saturday	April 4	at RiverCity Rage	L 20–59	2–2	Family Arena
5	Friday	April 10	Muskegon Thunder	W 65–21	3–2	Dow Event Center
6	Saturday	April 18	at Bloomington Extreme	L 38–48	3–3	U.S. Cellular Coliseum
7	Saturday	April 25	at RiverCity Rage	L 29–60	3–4	Family Arena
8	Friday	May 1	at Muskegon Thunder	L 26–34	3–5	L. C. Walker Arena
9	Friday	May 8	Maryland Maniacs	L 32–41	3–6	Dow Event Center
10	Saturday	May 16	at Maryland Maniacs	L13–40	3–7	The Show Place Arena
11	Friday	May 22	Bloomington Extreme	L 42–44	3–8	Dow Event Center
12	Saturday	May 30	at Rochester Raiders	L 13–48	3–9	Blue Cross Arena
13	Sunday	June 5	Maryland Maniacs	L 25–26	3–10	Dow Event Center
14	BYE					
15	Friday	June 19	Sioux City Bandits	L 23–53	3–11	Dow Event Center
16	BYE					
17	BYE					
18	BYE					

== Standings ==
Team	Overall			Division		
Team	Wins	Losses	Percentage	Wins	Losses	Percentage
United Conference
Atlantic Division
Maryland Maniacs	10	4	0.714	8	1	0.888
Rochester Raiders	10	4	0.714	5	3	0.625
RiverCity Rage	8	6	0.571	5	2	0.714
Saginaw Sting	3	12	0.200	3	8	0.273
Muskegon Thunder	1	13	0.071	1	11	0.083
Central Division
Omaha Beef	12	2	0.857	4	1	0.800
Bloomington Extreme	11	3	0.786	4	0	1.000
Wichita Wild	9	5	0.643	3	4	0.429
Sioux Falls Storm	6	8	0.429	2	3	0.400
Sioux City Bandits	6	9	0.400	2	7	0.222
Intense Conference
Lone Star Division
El Paso Generals	12	2	0.857	8	2	0.800
Abilene Ruff Riders	9	5	0.643	9	3	0.750
San Angelo Stampede Express	5	9	0.357	3	8	0.273
Corpus Christi Hammerheads	5	9	0.357	5	9	0.357
Odessa Roughnecks	3	11	0.214	3	8	0.273
Pacific Division
Billings Outlaws	12	2	0.857	7	0	1.000
Fairbanks Grizzlies	7	7	0.500	5	4	0.555
Colorado Ice	5	9	0.357	3	2	0.600
Alaska Wild	0	14	0.000	0	8	0.000

- Green indicates clinched playoff berth
- Purple indicates division champion

== Roster ==
2009 Saginaw Sting roster
Quarterbacks: 7 Danny Southall; Running backs: 5 Robert Height; 1 Ricco Hill; Wide receivers: 80 DeMarcus Copes; 4 Jeremy McLaurin; 17 Adrian Perez; 24 Neuby Ras; 12 Jim Roth	Offensive linemen: 66 Chris Bell; 54 Randy Degg; 88 Desmond Gray; Defensive linemen: 63 L. Barnes; 90 Rondell Biggs; 3 Jeff Dembowske	Linebackers: 10 Andre Bell; 21 Ian Pleasant; Defensive backs: 9 Ruben Gay; 22 Joe McCledon; 11 B. J. Opong-Owusu; 2 Ernest Smith; Kickers: 6 Anthony Gallagher	Injured Reserve: currently vacant; Exempt List: currently vacant; Practice squad: currently vacant; rookies in italics Roster updated June 19, 2009; 20 Active, 0 Inactive, 0 PS → More rosters
