= Chris Respress =

American football player

No. 37
- Position: Cornerback

Personal information
- Born: Dayton, Ohio, U.S.
- Listed height: 5 ft 11 in (1.80 m)
- Listed weight: 195 lb (88 kg)

Career information
- High school: Dayton (OH) Meadowdale
- College: Defiance
- NFL draft: 2003: undrafted

Career history
- Miami Valley Silverbacks (2007–2009); Cincinnati Commandos (2010); Dayton Silverbacks (2011–2012); Dayton Sharks (2013–2014)

Awards and highlights
- 2010 CIFL Champion; 2011 CIFL Defensive Player of the Year

Christopher Eugene Respress is an American former professional football defensive back. He played football and also ran track & field collegiately at Defiance College.

== Early life ==
Chris was a graduate of Meadowdale High School in Dayton, Ohio. He excelled in both football and track & field.

== College career ==
Chris attended Defiance College, an NCAA Division III institution in Defiance, Ohio. He was a standout member of both the football and track & field teams. While on the football team, Chris played under coaches Robert Taylor and Greg Pscodna.

Respress's track school record places.

- He's tied for 5th fastest 100 M Dash times in school history with - 10.83 (2001)
- He owns the 4th fastest 200 M Dash time in school history with - 22.76 (2001)
- Owns the 10th longest jump in the school's Long Jump history with - 20' 8" (2003)
- Owns the 8th longest jump in the school's Triple Jump history with - 41' 8" (2001)

== Professional career ==
In 2007, Respress quickly jumped at the opportunity to try out for the local indoor football team, the Miami Valley Silverbacks. He made the team and played 3 seasons for them starting as a cornerback, and occasionally returning kicks. He helped the team to their first ever playoff berth. In 2008, he had 47 tackles and 5 interceptions.

In 2010, Respress left the more local Silverbacks, to join the newly founded Cincinnati Commandos. He contributed 16.5 tackles and three interceptions while starting in a defensive backfield that proved to be the league's best, en route to CIFL Championship Game victory.

In 2011, he returned to the Silverbacks, as the team relocated to Dayton. Respress went on to have quite possibly the best season of his indoor football career posting 18.5 tackles, one sack and eight interceptions while leading the Silverbacks to an appearance in the CIFL Playoffs. He was named the 2011 CIFL Defensive Player of the Year, while playing for Defensive Coordinator, Lorenzo Styles.
