= Mario Urrutia =

American gridiron football player and executive (born 1986)

No. 84
- Position: Wide receiver

Personal information
- Born: January 18, 1986 (age 40); Louisville, Kentucky, U.S.
- Listed height: 6 ft 6 in (1.98 m)
- Listed weight: 238 lb (108 kg)

Career information
- High school: Fern Creek (Louisville)
- College: Louisville
- NFL draft: 2008: 7th round, 246th overall pick

Career history

Playing
- Cincinnati Bengals (2008–2009)*; New York Jets (2009)*; Tampa Bay Buccaneers (2009); Hartford Colonials (2010)*; Sacramento Mountain Lions (2011)*; Utah Blaze (2013); New Orleans VooDoo (2014)*; Kentucky Xtreme (2014); Winnipeg Blue Bombers (2014)*
- * Offseason or practice squad member only

Operations
- Kentucky Xtreme (co-owner) (2014)

Awards and highlights
- Freshman All-American (2005); 2× Second-team All-Big East (2005–2006); AFL Rookie of the Year (2013)

Career AFL statistics
- Receptions: 142
- Receiving yards: 1,675
- Receiving touchdowns: 38
- Stats at ArenaFan.com
- Stats at Pro Football Reference

Mario Urrutia Jr. (born January 18, 1986) is an American former football wide receiver. He was selected by the Cincinnati Bengals in the seventh round of the 2008 NFL draft. He played college football at Louisville.

Urrutia was also a member of the New York Jets, Tampa Bay Buccaneers, Hartford Colonials, Sacramento Mountain Lions, Utah Blaze, New Orleans VooDoo, Kentucky Xtreme and Winnipeg Blue Bombers. He was also a co-owner of the Xtreme.

== Early life ==
Born the son of Ruth Annette and Mario Urrutia Sr., Urrutia attended Fern Creek High School in Louisville, Kentucky, where he was a member of the Tigers football team.

College recruiting
Name	Hometown	School	Height	Weight	40^{‡}	Commit date
Mario Urrutia; WR	Louisville, Kentucky	Fern Creek High School	6 ft 5 in (1.96 m)	195 lb (88 kg)	4.6	Jan 18, 2004
Mario Urrutia; WR	Recruit ratings: Scout: Rivals:					
Overall recruit ranking: Scout: 66 (WR) Rivals: 72 (WR), 6 (KY)
Note: In many cases, Scout, Rivals, 247Sports, On3, and ESPN may conflict in their listings of height and weight.; In these cases, the average was taken. ESPN grades are on a 100-point scale.; Sources: "Louisville Football Commitment List". Rivals.; "Louisville College Football Recruiting Commits". Scout.; "Scout.com Team Recruiting Rankings". Scout.; "2004 Team Ranking". Rivals.com.

Urrutia committed to the University of Louisville on January 18, 2004. He chose Louisville over football scholarships from Indiana, Kentucky, Nebraska, Virginia and West Virginia.

== College career ==
In Urrutia's freshman year, he was named second-team All Big East Conference. Catching 37 passes for 797 yards, he ranked third on the team in both statistics. He was also named a Sporting News Freshman All-American.

While the squad went 12–1, including a win over ACC champion Wake Forest in the 2007 Orange Bowl, Urrutia had his best statistical season during this year, catching a career-high 58 balls for 973 yards. He also had 6 touchdown catches. He was second on the team in catches.

Urrutia did not repeat the success of his 2006 season in 2007. He played in only 8 games, catching 35 passes for 501 yards and 3 touchdowns. He left Louisville on December 14, 2007.

== Professional career ==
=== Cincinnati Bengals ===
Urrutia was selected 246th overall by the Cincinnati Bengals in the seventh round of the 2008 NFL draft. He was waived on August 30, 2008, and signed to the Bengals' practice squad on September 1, 2008. He signed a reserve/future contract on December 29, 2008. He was waived by the Bengals on June 22, 2009.

=== New York Jets ===
Urrutia signed with the New York Jets on June 25, 2009. He was waived on August 5, 2009.

=== Tampa Bay Buccaneers ===
Urrutia was signed by the Tampa Bay Buccaneers on August 7, 2009. He was waived on September 5 and signed to the practice squad on September 7, 2009. He was promoted to the active roster on September 26, 2009, waived on September 28, and signed to the practice squad on September 30, 2009. Urrutia was promoted to the active roster for the second time on December 21, 2009. He was waived by the Buccaneers on August 10, 2010.

=== Sacramento Mountain Lions ===
Urrutia signed with the Sacramento Mountain Lions of the United Football League (UFL) in May 2011.

=== Utah Blaze ===
On March 1, 2013, Urrutia was assigned by the Utah Blaze of the Arena Football League as a wide receiver. He caught 142 passes for 1,675 yards and scoring 39 touchdowns in 2013, winning the Arena Football League Rookie of the Year Award.

=== New Orleans VooDoo ===
On September 6, 2013, Urrutia was selected by the New Orleans VooDoo during the dispersal draft.

=== Kentucky Xtreme ===
In November 2013, Urrutia announced that he would be joining the Kentucky Xtreme front office as a co-owner. Urrutia also played for the Xtreme.

=== Winnipeg Blue Bombers ===
Urruita signed with the Winnipeg Blue Bombers of the Canadian Football League (CFL) on March 7, 2014. He was released on June 20, 2014.
