= Port Huron Civic Theatre =

Theater and theater company in Port Huron, Michigan, United States

Coordinates: 42°58′44″N 82°25′32″W

The Port Huron Civic Theatre (formerly Port Huron Little Theatre) is a historical theatre which started in 1956 in the town of Port Huron, Michigan. For sixteen years, PHLT brought 84 productions to the McMorran Place Theatre stage. In 1976, the theatre purchased and renovated an old church in town for a place of their own. However, in 1983 the theatre returned to McMorran Place Theatre for the larger atmosphere. In 1989, the theatre changed the name to Port Huron Civic Theatre to "better reflect a growing, county-wide membership".

The theatre's board elected to produce "Game Night", the first original play to be produced by the group in its then 55-year term. Produced in the spring of 2011, the play was written by Port Huron resident Jeremy Stemen.
