= 2013 Continental Indoor Football League season =

2013 CIFL season
- League: Continental Indoor Football League
- Sport: Indoor Football
- Duration: February 8, 2013 – April 28, 2013

Regular season
- Season champions: Erie Explosion
- Season MVP: C. J. Tarver

League postseason
- 1 vs 4 CIFL Semifinals champions: Erie Explosion
- 1 vs 4 CIFL Semifinals runners-up: Kentucky Xtreme
- 2 vs 3 CIFL Semifinals champions: Saginaw Sting
- 2 vs 3 CIFL Semifinals runners-up: Dayton Sharks

2013 CIFL
- Champions: Erie Explosion
- Runners-up: Saginaw Sting
- Finals MVP: Richard Stokes

CIFL seasons
- ← 2012 2014 →

The 2013 Continental Indoor Football League season will be the Continental Indoor Football League's eighth overall season. The regular season will start on Friday February 8, with the Marion Blue Racers visiting the Saginaw Sting at the Dow Event Center, and will end with the 2013 CIFL Championship Game, the league's championship game being held on, or around, May 18. The league approved the expansion of the playoff format from four teams to six teams (with the top two teams receiving byes).

== Schedule ==
For the 2013 season there will be a 10-game, 12-week regular season running from February to April. Each team will host 5 games, and have five away games. For the first time in league history, there will be Monday night games.

== Regular season standings ==
2013 Continental Indoor Football League
Team	W	L	T	PCT	PF	PA	PF (Avg.)	PA (Avg.)	STK
y-Erie Explosion	10	0	0	1.000	467	218	46.7	21.8	W10
x-Dayton Sharks	8	2	0	.800	478	303	47.8	30.3	L2
x-Saginaw Sting	8	2	0	.800	377	320	37.7	32.0	W3
x-Kentucky Xtreme	7	3	0	.700	497	328	49.7	32.8	W2
Detroit Thunder	4	6	0	.400	282	389	28.2	38.9	L1
Port Huron Patriots	4	6	0	.400	255	336	25.5	33.6	L1
Kentucky Drillers	2	8	0	.200	270	475	27.0	47.5	W1
Marion Blue Racers	2	8	0	.200	317	428	31.7	42.8	W1
Owensboro Rage	5	5	0	.500	195	267	19.5	26.7	L2
Kane County Dawgs^{†}	0	1	0	.000	13	69	13	69	L1

y - clinched home playoff game

x - clinched playoff spot

^{†}Kane County played the second game on their schedule, but forfeited the other nine.

== Playoffs ==
Semifinals
3	Saginaw	66
2	Dayton	63
4	Kentucky Xtreme	6
1	Erie	55

CIFL Championship Game
3	Saginaw	36
1	Erie	37

== Rule changes ==
- Starting in 2013 teams will be allowed to expand their active roster from 19 players up to 21 this year and are being required to carry a backup Quarterback and Kicker.
- Teams will score a single point on their kickoff if the ball makes its way through the uprights.
- Defensive Backs are not allowed to blitz
- Starting in 2013 coaches will be permitted to coach on the field again, which will improve communication between them and their players

== Coaching changes ==
=== Pre-season ===
Team	2013 Coach	2012 Coach(es)	Reason for leaving	Story/Accomplishments
Marion Blue Racers	Martino Theus	Lorenzo Styles/ Marc Huddleston	Resigned/ Contract not renewed	On March 30, 2012, Styles resigned as the head coach of the Blue Racers after compiling a 3–1 record, citing personal reason as the reason for his resignation. Offensive Coordinator Marc Huddleston, took over as the team's head coach. Huddleston's contract was not renewed after the 2012 season. On September 18, 2012, the Blue Racers name, CEO and general manager, LaMonte Coleman, as the team's 5th head coach in franchise history. But, three weeks prior to the season's start, offensive coordinator Martino Theus was promoted to head coach.

=== In-season ===
Team	Interim Coach	2013 Coach(es)	Reason for leaving	Story/Accomplishments
Port Huron Patriots	Demar Cranford	Dave Kinsman	Resigned	On February 21, Kinsman resigned as the head coach of the Patriots, as he sold the team to Jude Carter, and was set to deploy to Afghanistan. Carter named Demar Cranford as the team's new head coach the same day.

== Awards ==
=== Regular season awards ===
Award	Winner	Position	Team
CIFL MVP	C. J. Tarver	Wide receiver	Saginaw Sting
Offensive Player of the Year	Tommy Jones	Quarterback	Dayton Sharks
Defensive Player of the Year	Kwaheem Smith	Defensive back	Erie Explosion
Special Teams Player of the Year	C. J. Tarver	Wide receiver	Saginaw Sting

=== 1st Team All-CIFL ===
Offense
Quarterback	A. J. McKenna, Saginaw
Running back	Richard Stokes, Erie
Wide receiver	C. J. Tarver, Saginaw; Robert Redd, Dayton; Alfonso Hoggard, Erie
Offensive tackle	Eric Brim, Saginaw; Andrew Phelan, Dayton; William Hasse, Marion; Anthony Richardson, KY Xtreme
Center	Dave McQuiston, Erie

Defense
Defensive lineman	James Spikes, Dayton; Andre Portis, Erie; Andre Thomas, Detroit; Thomas McKenzie, Marion
Linebacker	P. J. Jackson, Port Huron; Jon D'Angelo, Erie; Santino Turnbow, Dayton
Defensive back	Kwaheem Smith, Erie; Jamar Hibler, Saginaw; Ricardo Kemp, Erie

Special teams
Kicker	Shon Rowser, Erie

=== 2nd Team All-CIFL ===
Offense
Quarterback	Tommy Jones, Dayton
Running back	Derrick Moss, Dayton
Wide receiver	Doug Beaumont, KY Xtreme; Reggie Eubanks, Detroit; Kenyez Mincy, Dayton
Offensive tackle	Frank Straub, Dayton; Richard Gedelian, Detroit; George Frisch, Erie; Brian Moore, Saginaw
Center	Josh Pack, Saginaw

Defense
Defensive end	Dwayne Holmes, Port Huron; Mike Sowell, KY Xtreme; Nate Synder, Saginaw; Zach Williams, Erie
Linebacker	Andrew DeWeerd, Saginaw; Doug Emery, Detroit; Brandon McElwee, Erie
Defensive back	Jamaal Hibler, Sagniaw; Jeremy Satchel, Marion; Mike Davis, Dayton

Special teams
Kicker	Chris Kollias, Saginaw
