= C. J. Tarver =

American gridiron football player (born 1984)

No. 1, 2, 3, 12, 28
- Position: Wide receiver

Personal information
- Born: July 10, 1984 (age 42); Albany, New York, U.S.
- Listed height: 5 ft 8 in (1.73 m)
- Listed weight: 160 lb (73 kg)

Career information
- High school: Albany (NY) Bishop Maginn
- College: Hudson Valley C. C.
- NFL draft: 2006: undrafted

Career history
- Albany Metro Mallers (2011–2013); Saginaw Sting (2012–2013); Trenton Freedom (2014)*; Saginaw Sting (2014); Winnipeg Blue Bombers (2014)*; Saginaw Sting (2015); Erie Explosion (2015); Abilene Warriors (2016)*; Winston Wildcats (2016); Boston Blaze (2017)
- * Offseason or practice squad member only

Awards and highlights
- 2× CIFL Special Team Player of the Year (2012, 2013); CIFL Champion (2012); CIFL MVP (2013)
- Stats at CFL.ca (archive)

Charles J. Tarver is an American former professional football wide receiver. He played college football at Hudson Valley Community College.

== Early life ==
Tarver attended Bishop Maginn High School in Albany, New York, where he was a member of both the basketball and football teams.

== College career ==
Tarver attended Hudson Valley Community College after high school, where he continued his football career. After just one semester at Hudson Valley, Tarver transferred to Schenectady County Community College, he played basketball.

== Professional career ==
=== Saginaw Sting ===
Tarver joined the Saginaw Sting of the Continental Indoor Football League (CIFL) in 2012. Playing as a wide receiver, Tarver was named the CIFL's Special Teams Player of the Year in 2012. Tarver also helped the Sting win the 2012 CIFL Championship Game over the Dayton Silverbacks. Tarver returned to the Sting in 2013, where he was named the CIFL's MVP as well as Special Teams Player of the Year, but the Sting fell in the Championship Game to the Erie Explosion.

=== Winnipeg Blue Bombers ===
In April 2014, Tarver signed with the Winnipeg Blue Bombers of the Canadian Football League (CFL).

=== Erie Explosion ===
On May 12, 2015, Tarver signed with the Erie Explosion of the Professional Indoor Football League (PIFL).

=== Abilene Warriors ===
Tarver signed with the Abilene Warriors of American Indoor Football in 2016.

=== Boston Blaze ===
Tarver signed with the Boston Blaze of the Can-Am Indoor Football League in 2017.
