= Port Huron Patriots =

Defunct indoor football team in Michigan, USA

- Logo
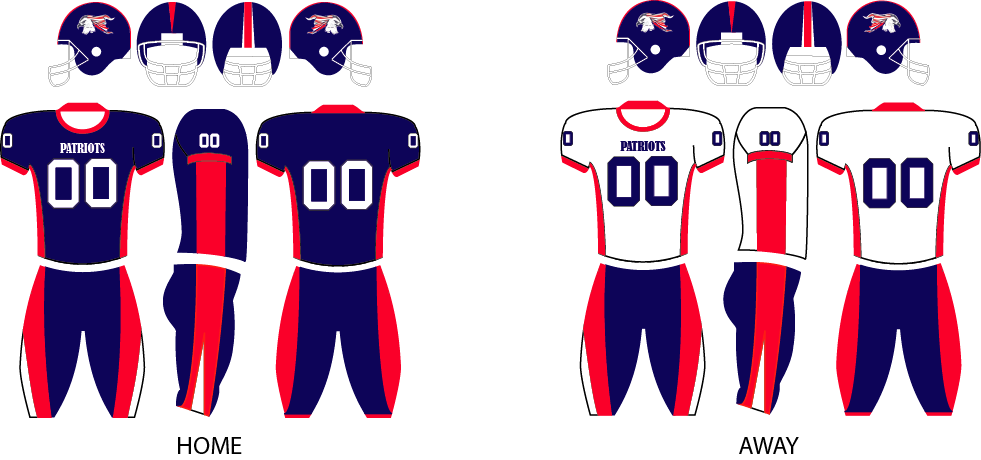
- Uniforms

General information
- Founded: 2011
- Folded: 2014
- Headquartered: McMorran Arena in Port Huron, Michigan
- Colors: Red, Navy, White

Personnel
- Owners: Jude Carter; Lonnie Nichols; Lance Nichols; David Nichols; Larry Page; Matt Wuchte; Nick Kennedy-Saura
- General manager: Jude Carter
- Head coach: John Forti (2012); Dave Kinsman (2012); Demar Cranford (2013–2014); Terry Foster (2014)

Team history
- Port Huron Patriots (2012–2014)

Home fields
- McMorran Arena (2012–2014)

League / conference affiliations
- Continental Indoor Football League (2012–2014): North Division (2014)

The Port Huron Patriots were a professional indoor football team based in Port Huron, Michigan. The team was a member of the North Division of the Continental Indoor Football League (CIFL). The Patriots joined the CIFL in 2012 as an expansion team. The Patriots were the third indoor football team to be based in Port Huron, the first being CIFL charter members and inaugural champions the Port Huron Pirates (2006–2007), and the other being the CIFL based Port Huron Predators. The Owners of the Patriots were Jude Carter, Lonnie Nichols, Lance Nichols, David Nichols, Larry Page, Matt Wuchte and Nick Kennedy-Saura. The Patriots played their home games at the McMorran Arena.

== Franchise history ==
=== Play begins: 2012 ===
After the disappointing end to the Port Huron Predators season in 2011, Dave and Cyndi Kinsman wanted to bring back a team to Port Huron in 2012 and the future. Kinsman stated, "We are aware of the history of teams in this city and the bottom line is that you have to win on and off the field to make this succeed. Other teams could win on the field, but couldn't win off the field meaning they didn't have the front office and leadership it takes to succeed. We are confident in the direction this franchise will head and we are thrilled to be in Port Huron." The team also announced that they would be playing at McMorran Arena during Kinsman's press conference. In early September 2011, the Patriots signed former Predators head coach John Forti, as well as re-signed local players who had played for the Predators. On December 24, 2011 the team announced its training camp roster.

On February 11, 2012, the team played its first preseason game. They defeated the outdoor semi-professional Southern Michigan Timberwolves 35–21. This first unofficial win came in the wake of the tragic loss of Offensive Lineman Ken Hamilton, who was killed in a shooting outside of a Detroit nightclub. Teammate Antonio Martin was also injured in the shooting. On March 10, 2012, the Patriots earned their first victory in franchise history with a 52–49 victory over the Chicago Vipers.

On March 29, 2012 Kinsman fired head coach John Forti, and the rest of his staff. Kinsman cited Forti's decision to hire his friends as assistant coaches and not make the best choices for the team as their reason for Forti's termination.

Kinsman went on to lead the Patriots to a 3–4 record, making them 4–6 overall, clinching the 4th seed in the CIFL playoffs, but despite this factor, the league decided to shorten the playoffs. This left the Patriots and the Evansville Rage both out of the playoffs.

=== 2013 ===
The Patriots will return to the CIFL in 2013. On February 21, just two games into the season, the Kinsman's sold the team, as David was scheduled to deploy to Afghanistan. The team was sold locally to Jude Carter, Lonnie Nichols, Lance Nichols, David Nichols, Larry Page, Matt Wuchte and Nick Kennedy-Saura, with Carter also serving as the team's general manager. The also announced that the team's new head coach would be Demar Cranford.

=== 2014 ===
In June 2013, the Patriots agreed to terms with the CIFL to return for the 2014 season. Coach Demar Cranford left the team as did several players just prior to their April 13, 2014, game against the Erie Explosion. He says he resigned, but team co-owner Jude Carter said he was fired due to "lack of leadership and the team’s lack of performance". The team (using replacement players from the Erie Express, a semi-pro team from the Explosion's hometown of Erie) would lose to the Explosion 114–0, leaving their future in serious doubt, but Carter stated otherwise. After the season, the CIFL disbanded and its remaining active teams joined other leagues; by this time, the Patriots' owner could no longer be reached.

== Logos and uniforms ==
The team announced that its logo would be a bald eagle's head with a flag in the background, and the colors would be red, white and blue, during a September 24, 2011 press conference at the McMorran

== All-League players ==
The following Patriots players have been named to All-League Teams:

- RB/LB Quentin Celano (1)

== Head coaches ==
Name	Term	Regular season				Playoffs		Awards
Name	Term	W	L	T	Win%	W	L	Awards
Quentin Celano	2012	1	2	0	.333	0	0	
Quentin Celano	2012–2013	4	5	0	.444	0	0	
Quentin Celano	2013–2014	4	11	0	.267	0	0	
Quentin Celano	2014	0	1	0	.000	0	0	

== Season-by-season results ==
League champions	Conference champions	Division champions	Wild card berth	League leader

Season	Team	League	Conference	Division	Regular season				Postseason results
Season	Team	League	Conference	Division	Finish	Wins	Losses	Ties	Postseason results
2012	2012	CIFL			4th	4	6	0	
2013	2013	CIFL			6th	4	6	0	
2014	2014	CIFL		North	4th	1	8	0	
Totals						9	20	0	All-time regular season record (2012–2014)
Totals						0	0	-	All-time postseason record (2012–2014)
Totals						9	20	0	All-time regular season and postseason record (2012–2014)
