= Canlan Ice Sports Arena (Romeoville) =

Sports facility in Romeoville, Illinois, US

- Interactive map of Canlan Ice Sports Arena
- Location: 1581 W Normantown Road, Romeoville, IL 60446
- Coordinates: 41.6464°N 88.1402°W
- Owner: CanCanlan Ice Sports Corporation
- Operator: Canlan Ice Sports Corporation
- Surface: Ice

Tenant
- Kane County Dawgs (CIFL) (2013)

Canlan Ice Sports Arena is a multi-sport facility in Romeoville, Illinois. Their indoor rinks cans be used for ice hockey and figure skating The facility is located 45 miles west of Chicago.

In 2013, the arena became home to the Kane County Dawgs of the Continental Indoor Football League.

== Facilities ==
The Canlan Ice Sports Arena offers

- 3 regulation-size hockey rinks.
