= Saginaw Sting =

American indoor football team

Logo

General information
- Founded: 2008
- Folded: 2015
- Headquartered: Dow Event Center in Saginaw, Michigan
- Colors: Green, orange
- Mascot: Stanley Stinger

Personnel
- Owners: Stuart Schweigert, Rob Licht & Tom O'Brien
- General manager: Rob Licht
- Head coach: Karl Featherstone (2008–2009); Jason Lovelock (2009); John Mize (2011); Vince Leveille (2011); Fred Townsend (2012–2014); James Perry II (2014); Greg Wasmer (2015); Stuart Schweigert (2015)

Team history
- Saginaw Sting (2008–2009, 2011–2015)

Home fields
- Dow Event Center (2008–2009, 2011–2016)

League / conference affiliations
- Continental Indoor Football League (2008): Atlantic Conference (2008); West Division (2008); Indoor Football League (2009): United Conference (2009); Atlantic Division (2009); Ultimate Indoor Football League (2011); Continental Indoor Football League (2012–2014): North Division (2014); American Indoor Football (2015)

Championships
- League championships: 3: CIFL: 2008, 2012; UIFL: 2011
- Conference championships: 1: CIFL: 2008
- Division championships: 1: CIFL: 2014

Playoff appearances (6)
- CIFL: 2008, 2012, 2013, 2014; UIFL: 2011; AIF: 2015

The Saginaw Sting was a professional indoor football team based in Saginaw, Michigan. The team was most recently a member of American Indoor Football (AIF). They began play in 2008 as an expansion team in the Continental Indoor Football League, and then moved to the Indoor Football League for the 2009 season. They suspended operations for the 2010 season before becoming an inaugural member of the Ultimate Indoor Football League. The following season they were suspended by the UIFL and re-joined the CIFL under new ownership. The team has since moved to the AIF. The owners of the Sting were Stuart Schweigert, Rob Licht and Jim O'Brien. The Sting played their home games at The Dow Event Center in Saginaw, Michigan.

They are one of only a few teams to ever win a championship in multiple leagues (CIFL in 2008, the UIFL in 2011 and the CIFL again in 2012).

== Franchise history ==
=== 2008 ===
The team began play in 2008 as an expansion team in the CIFL. The original team owners were Mike Johnson, Mike Trumbull, and Esteban Rivera, who also owned the Kalamazoo Xplosion. The team was led by former Michigan State quarterback Damon Dowdell, who led the league in passing yards (2,190), touchdowns (54) and completion percentage (62%). Nick Body was Dowdell's favorite target, leading the league in receptions (78), yards (1,005) and touchdowns (31). Despite their offensive numbers, neither player won Offensive Player of the Year or the CIFL MVP. The duo led the Sting to a 10–2 regular season and a playoff berth. On June 29, 2008, the Sting defeated the Xplosion 41–37 to win the CIFL Championship Game.

=== 2009: Moving to the IFL ===
A number of Sting and Xplosion players indicated at the end of the 2008 season that wages were in arrears from the owners. This led to an investigation of Johnson in his role as Sting general manager. Trumbull, owner of Triple Threat Sports in Battle Creek, and Rivera, a Battle Creek police officer, offered a deal to split ownership of the two teams, with Trumbell and Rivera owning the Sting, and Johnson receiving the Xplosion. Trumbull and Rivera indicated that they planned for the Sting to move to the new Indoor Football League. The Sting looked to have put together a promising team with the re-signing of QB Damon Dowdell, and signing 2007 CIFL MVP, WR/RB Robert Height, but the team fared poorly on the field in the IFL.

=== 2011: Return to action ===
Prior to the 2011 season, the team was purchased by San Diego–based businessman Mike Esposito. He announced that the team would play in the newly formed Ultimate Indoor Football League; Esposito was also the league's commissioner. He hired Stuart Schweigert as the Sting's director of player development. The Sting went on to win the Ultimate Bowl, with quarterback Tommy Jones setting several UIFL passing records and claiming the Ultimate Bowl's MVP honors.

=== 2012: Return to the CIFL ===
On November 11, 2011, the Sting were acquired by Schweigert, Rob Licht and Jim O'Brien. The new ownership announced the same day that they would be moving the team back to the CIFL. On December 29, 2011, the Sting announced that 2011 interim head coach Vince Leveille would return as the full-time head coach for the 2012 season, but just 11 days before the team's first game, Leveille stepped down as the head coach, citing that his full-time job made him unavailable to do both. Defensive Coordinator Fred Townsend took over as the team's head coach. With an 8–0 record, the Sting returned to the CIFL playoffs for the first time since 2008, when they won the 2008 CIFL Championship Game and finished the season as the Atlantic Conference's #2 seed. In the 2012 CIFL Championship Game, the Sting defeated the Dayton Silverbacks 35–7, to win the CIFL championship. The title for the Sting was their third in the last four seasons of playing.

=== 2013 ===
The Sting's first move in its quest for a title defense in 2013 was re-signing head coach Fred Townsend to a three-year contract extension.

Ultimately, the Sting progressed to the 2013 CIFL Championship Game. With less than a minute to play, the team found itself on its opponent's nine-yard line down by one point. Due to the placekicker being suspended the previous week, the team had nobody capable of kicking even a 24-yard chip shot, and were forced to attempt a touchdown. They failed, giving the Erie Explosion the championship and a perfect season.

=== 2014 ===
In June 2013, the Sting agreed to terms with the CIFL to return for the 2014 season. The Sting won their first eighth game of the season to advance to 8–0, but during that game they lost quarterback A. J. McKenna to injury. The following week the team lost 2013 league MVP, C. J. Tarver to the Winnipeg Blue Bombers of the Canadian Football League (CFL). The loss of those two key players became noticeable when the Sting lost their final regular season game to finish 9–1. Just one day before the Sting's first playoff game, head coach Fred Townsend announced his resignation. Line Coach James Perry II was named the team's interim head coach.

=== 2015: Moving to the AIF ===
In October 2014, the Sting announced they would be joining American Indoor Football (AIF). They also announced the hiring of Greg Wasmer as the franchise's new head coach. After a 0–2 start for the Sting, Wasmer was fired and owner Stuart Schweigert was named the head coach of the Sting.

=== 2016: Attempted CIFL revival and suspension of operations ===
On August 23, 2015, the Sting announced that they would rejoin the revived CIFL, which became a member of the Indoor Football Alliance. After months of no new teams joining the CIFL, the Sting re-joined the AIF for the 2016 season, but were removed from the AIF schedules in early 2016 and appear to have disbanded without any official announcement. Owner Jim O'Brien stated that they suspended operations due to league instability but planned to return for 2017.

== Notable players ==
=== Awards and honors ===
The following is a list of all Sting players who have won league awards.

Season	Player	Position	Award
2011	Tommy Jones	QB	UIFL Offensive Player of the Year
2011	Tommy Jones	QB	UIFL Ultimate Bowl I MVP
2012	Tommy Jones	QB	CIFL MVP
2012	Tommy Jones	QB	CIFL Offensive Player of the Year
2012	C. J. Tarver	WR	CIFL Special Teams Player of the Year
2013	C. J. Tarver	WR	CIFL MVP
2013	C. J. Tarver	WR	CIFL Special Teams Player of the Year
2014	Spenser Smith	LB	CIFL Defensive Player of the Year

=== All-League players ===
The following Sting players have been named to All-League Teams:

- QB Tommy Jones (1), A. J. McKenna (3)
- RB DeShawn Hayes (2)
- WR LaVaughn Macon (1), C. J. Tarver (2), Daryl Gooden (1)
- OL Eric Brim (3), Steve Michalek (1), Josh Peck (1), Brian Moore (1), Devin Smith (1)
- DL Mike McFadden (1), Nate Snyder (1), Desmond Kenner (1), Edison Vushaj (1)
- LB Kyle McKenzie (1), Phillip Smith (1), Andrew DeWeerd (1), Spenser Smith (1), Justin Barnes (1)
- DB Jamar Hibler (1), Jamaal Hibler (1), LaTreze Mushatt (1), Mathis Quillan
- K Chris Kollias (1)

== Head coaches ==
Name	Term	Regular season				Playoffs		Awards
Name	Term	W	L	T	Win %	W	L	Awards
Karl Featherstone	2008–2009	12	4	0	.750	3	0	
Jason Lovelock	2009	1	10	0	.091	0	0	
John Mize	2011	2	1	0	.667	0	0	
Vince Leveille	2011	7	4	0	.636	2	0	
Fred Townsend	2012–2014	25	3	0	.893	2	1	
James Perry II	2014	0	0	0	–	0	1	
Greg Wasmer	2015	0	2	0	.000	0	0	
Stuart Schweigert	2015	6	0	0	1.000	0	1	

== Season-by-season results ==
Note: The finish, wins, losses, and ties columns list regular season results and exclude any postseason play.

League champions	Conference champions	Division champions	Wild card berth	League leader

Season	Team	League	Conference	Division	Regular season				Postseason results
Season	Team	League	Conference	Division	Finish	Wins	Losses	Ties	Postseason results
2008	2008	CIFL	Atlantic	West	2nd	10	2	0	Won Divisional Playoffs (Mayhem) 41–34; Won Atlantic Conference Championship (Outlawz) 59–25; Won CIFL Championship Game (Xplosion) 41–37
2009	2009	IFL	United	Atlantic	4th	3	12	0	
2011	2011	UIFL			2nd	9	5	0	Won UIFL semifinals (River Monsters) 48–47; Won Ultimate Bowl I (Drillers) 86–69
2012	2012	CIFL			1st	8	0		Won CIFL Championship Game (Silverbacks) 35–7
2013	2013	CIFL			3rd	8	2	0	Won CIFL semifinal (Sharks) 66–63; Lost CIFL Championship Game (Explosion) 36–37
2014	2014	CIFL		North	1st	9	1	0	Lost North Division Championship (Explosion) 15–46
2015	2015	AIF			2nd	6	2	0	Lost AIF Semifinals (Blitz) 45–63
Totals						53	24	0	All-time regular season record (2008–2015)
Totals						7	3	—	All-time postseason record (2008–2015)
Totals						60	27	0	All-time regular season and postseason record (2008–2015)

* Season currently in progress
