= Taylor Sportsplex =

Sports complex located in Taylor, Michigan

- Interactive map of Taylor Sportsplex
- Location: Taylor, Michigan
- Coordinates: 42.2092°N 83.2666°W
- Owner: City of Taylor
- Operator: City of Taylor
- Capacity: 1,000
- Surface: Multi-purpose

Construction
- Opened: 2001

Tenants
- Detroit Waza (PASL) (2009–2013); Eastern Michigan Eagles (GLCHL) (2011–2024); Detroit Thunder (CIFL) (2013)

Website
- www.taylorsportsplex.com

The Taylor Sportsplex is a sports facility owned by and located in the City of Taylor, Michigan. The indoor facility contains four arenas that host a variety of sporting events—especially ice hockey and soccer—and a variety of special events.

== History ==
In March 2012, the ice arena at the facility had to be evacuated due to over 80 people, including around 30 hockey players participating in the state midget major championships, became sick with flu-like symptoms. Investigators concluded the symptoms were caused by a norovirus and closed the facility for three days until it had undergone a professional cleaning. In April 2012, the city council attempted to sell the sportsplex to JRV Consulting, a sports facility management company based in Mount Clemens for $6 million to pay off a $14 million bond debt for the complex but negotiations had ended in September 2013 with the city voting against selling the complex. On December 3, 2015, a shooting took place in the arena parking lot. 57-year-old Timothy Nelson Obeshaw opened fire with a handgun on the car of Sharon Elizabeth Watson, wounding her and killing her 7-year-old daughter, Emma Watson Nowling. "He struck the child first and then opened fire on the mother, and then turned and shot and killed himself," according to Taylor Police Chief Mary Sclabassi. Obeshaw was a family friend who actually lived with Emma, Watson, and Emma's father for the past year or so in nearby Belleville. He had recently moved to a home in Taylor, where police say he lived with at least one other person. Witnesses and family members told police Obeshaw had recently displayed signs of mental instability, and that he believed someone was out to 'get him'.

== Facilities ==
The Taylor Sportsplex is a premiere sports facility owned by the City of Taylor, Michigan. It contains four arenas—two are used primarily for ice hockey and figure skating; the other two are used primarily for indoor soccer. The Belle Tire Hockey Program and Eastern Michigan University are the main hockey tenants. The facility also is used for trade shows, high school graduation ceremonies, mixed martial arts and major sporting events.

== Notable events ==
From March 15, 2003 to March 21, 2003, the Professional Bowlers Association hosted the PBA World Championship bowling competition at the complex with Walter Ray Williams Jr. winning the championship. Until 2017, the Detroit Red Wings used the complex as a home away from home practice facility for upcoming games. From 2004 to 2006 and in 2013, the complex hosted the Tournament of Roller Hockey Series Championship, a roller hockey championship which featured various hockey teams from the United States and Canada.
