= Erie Insurance Arena =

Indoor arena in Erie, Pennsylvania

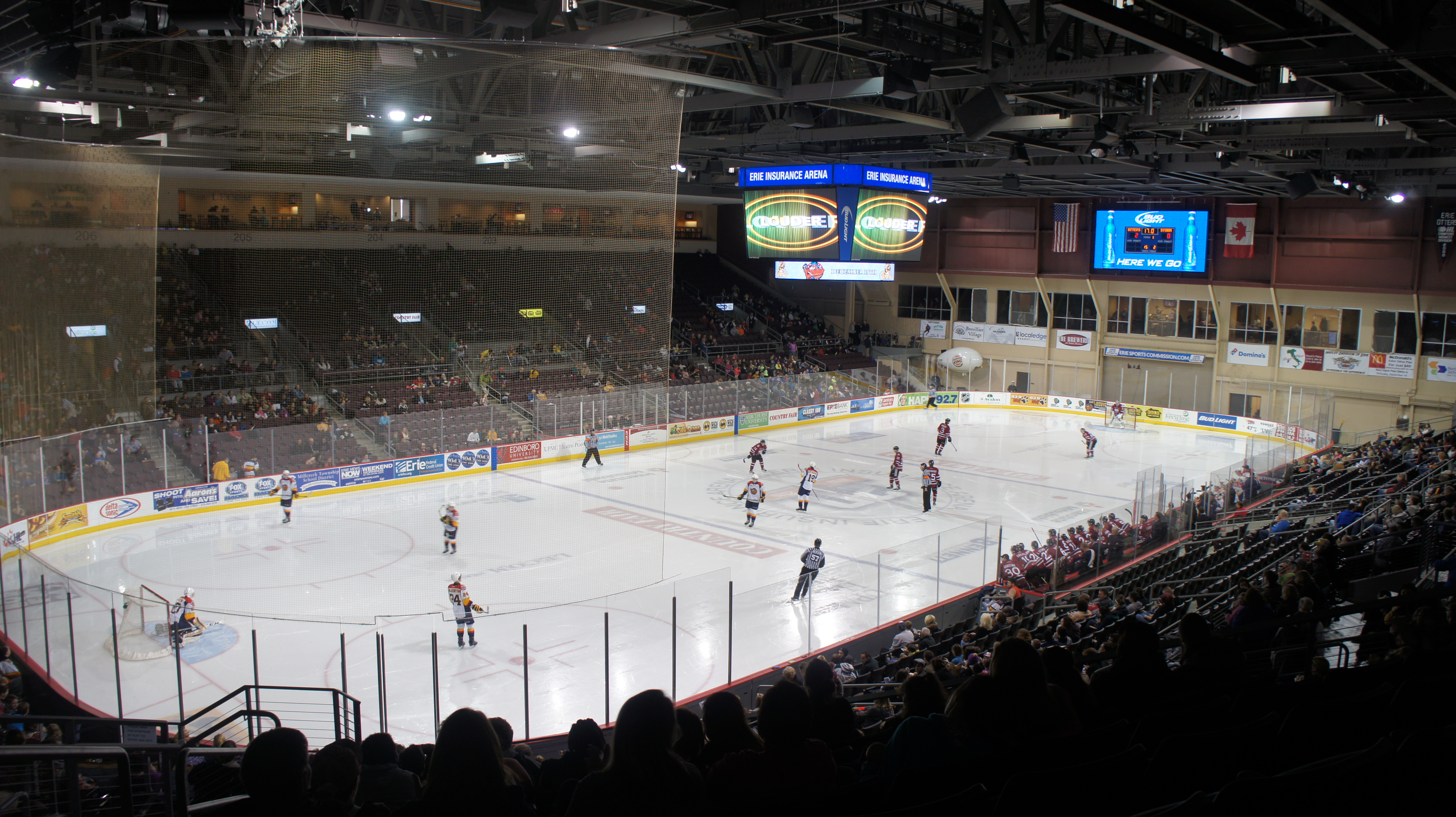

- Location within Pennsylvania Location within the United States
- Former names: Erie Civic Center; Louis J. Tullio Arena
- Address: 809 French Street
- Location: Erie, Pennsylvania, U.S.
- Coordinates: 42°7′41″N 80°4′51″W
- Owner: Erie County Convention Center Authority
- Operator: Erie County Convention Center Authority
- Capacity: 6,716 (Hockey); 6,562 (Indoor football); 6,982 (Basketball); 9,360 (Concert)

Construction
- Groundbreaking: September 1981
- Opened: June 7, 1983
- Renovated: Dec 2011 – Sept 2013
- Cost: $9.3 million
- Architects: Heidt, Evans & Salata (original); Sink Combs Dethlefs (renovation)

Tenants
- Erie Golden Blades (ACHL) (1983–1987); Erie Panthers (ECHL) (1988–1996); Erie Wave (WBL) (1990–1992); Erie Otters (OHL) (1996–present); Erie Invaders (IFL) (2000); Erie Freeze (AIFL/AIFA) (2005–2007); Erie BayHawks (NBA D-League) (2008–2017); Erie Explosion (SIFL/UIFL/CIFL/PIFL) (2011–2015); Lake Erie Eagles (NCPHL/CPJHL) (2016–2018); Erie BayHawks (NBA G League) (2017–2019); Erie BayHawks (NBA G League) (2019–2020)

Website
- erieinsurancearena.com

Erie Insurance Arena (originally known as Erie Civic Center and later, Louis J. Tullio Arena) is a multi-purpose indoor arena in the downtown area of Erie, Pennsylvania. It is home to the Erie Otters of the Ontario Hockey League and is the former home of the Erie BayHawks of the NBA G League. It was built in 1983 as part of the Erie Civic Center Complex Plaza, which also includes the Warner Theatre and UPMC Park, all of which are administered by the Erie County Convention Center Authority. The arena is named for the Erie Insurance Group, which purchased the naming rights in May 2012.

== History ==
Erie Insurance Arena was built for $9.3 million in 1983. It opened in June 1983 with a Beach Boys concert. Since then, it has hosted entertainers including Elton John, Rod Stewart, Cher, Kiss, Barry Manilow, Alan Jackson, Trans-Siberian Orchestra, Def Leppard and Alice Cooper. Erie Insurance Arena has also featured Blippi, Disney on Ice, WCW, WWE, TNA Wrestling, the Harlem Globetrotters, and the Ringling Bros. and Barnum & Bailey Circus.

In May 2012, the Erie County Convention Center Authority and the Erie Insurance Group announced a 10-year, $3 million naming agreement that would rename the former Louis J. Tullio Arena, "Erie Insurance Arena." This renaming coincided with the completion of the current $42 million renovation project, which was completed in September 2013. The renovation, designed by Friday/Sink Combs Dethlefs Joint Venture Architects, modernized the arena and added some new sections and a landscaped park entrance. Construction on the project was carried out by the Pittsburgh-based Turner Construction Company. Improvements included additional seating and concourses. To accommodate this, its footprint expanded from the original 152,000-square-foot (14,100 m^{2}) to 218,000-square-foot (20,300 m^{2}). This increased the venue's capacity to 6,833 for hockey, 6,754 for basketball, and about 9,000 for concerts. Erie Insurance Arena now has enlarged lobbies, more box office windows, luxury suites, administrative offices, mechanical rooms, training areas, new locker rooms, and a club level sponsored by the Erie Times-News. Funding for the renovations derived from $32 million pledged by former Pennsylvania governor Ed Rendell, combined with $10 million paid by Erie County. The arena has hosted numerous high school and college basketball games. Two of the most notable basketball games were between Cathedral Preparatory School and McDowell and local colleges, Gannon University and Mercyhurst University. Both games featured rival schools. Both games generated the most attended high school and college basketball games in city history, both selling out at 5,500.

In September 2014, the Erie County Convention Center Authority completed a $1.4 million upgrade to the arena, which had been dropped from the previous renovation due to a tightened budget. This upgrade included a closed-circuit video system, high-definition video panels on the east and west ends of the arena, and a high-definition "center ice" video scoreboard. The new scoreboard replaced the scoreboard added in 2006. The video boards replaced scoreboards from the original construction of the arena in 1983. The new scoreboard and video boards were manufactured by Daktronics.

== Television ==
- World Wrestling Federation taped their WWF Superstars and WWF Wrestling Challenge television programs from 1991 to 1995.
- World Championship Wrestling taped their WCW Thunder, WCW Worldwide, and WCW Saturday Night television programs from the Erie Civic Center from 1997 to 2000.

== 2011 NCAA Women's Frozen Four ==
Louis J. Tullio Arena, in conjunction with Mercyhurst College, hosted the 2011 NCAA National Collegiate Women's Ice Hockey Tournament, in which the Wisconsin Badgers defeated the Boston University Terriers in the championship final by a score of 4–1.

== 2014 NCAA Women's Division II National Elite Eight ==
Erie Insurance Arena, in conjunction with Gannon University, hosted the NCAA Division II women's basketball tournament, in which the Bentley Falcons defeated the West Texas A&M Buffaloes 73–65.

== Arena attractions ==
Erie Insurance Arena offers conventional food and beverage offerings such as pizza and corn dogs, as well as some more local items such as Greek hot dogs, Greek nachos, and pepperoni balls. The venue offers a separate menu for the floor seats, which includes the shrimp cocktail, spinach artichoke dip, steak burger on a pretzel bun, chicken bacon sandwich, cheesesteak, and a vegetable platter. It also features a selection of wine, beer, and mixed cocktail drinks.

== Gallery ==
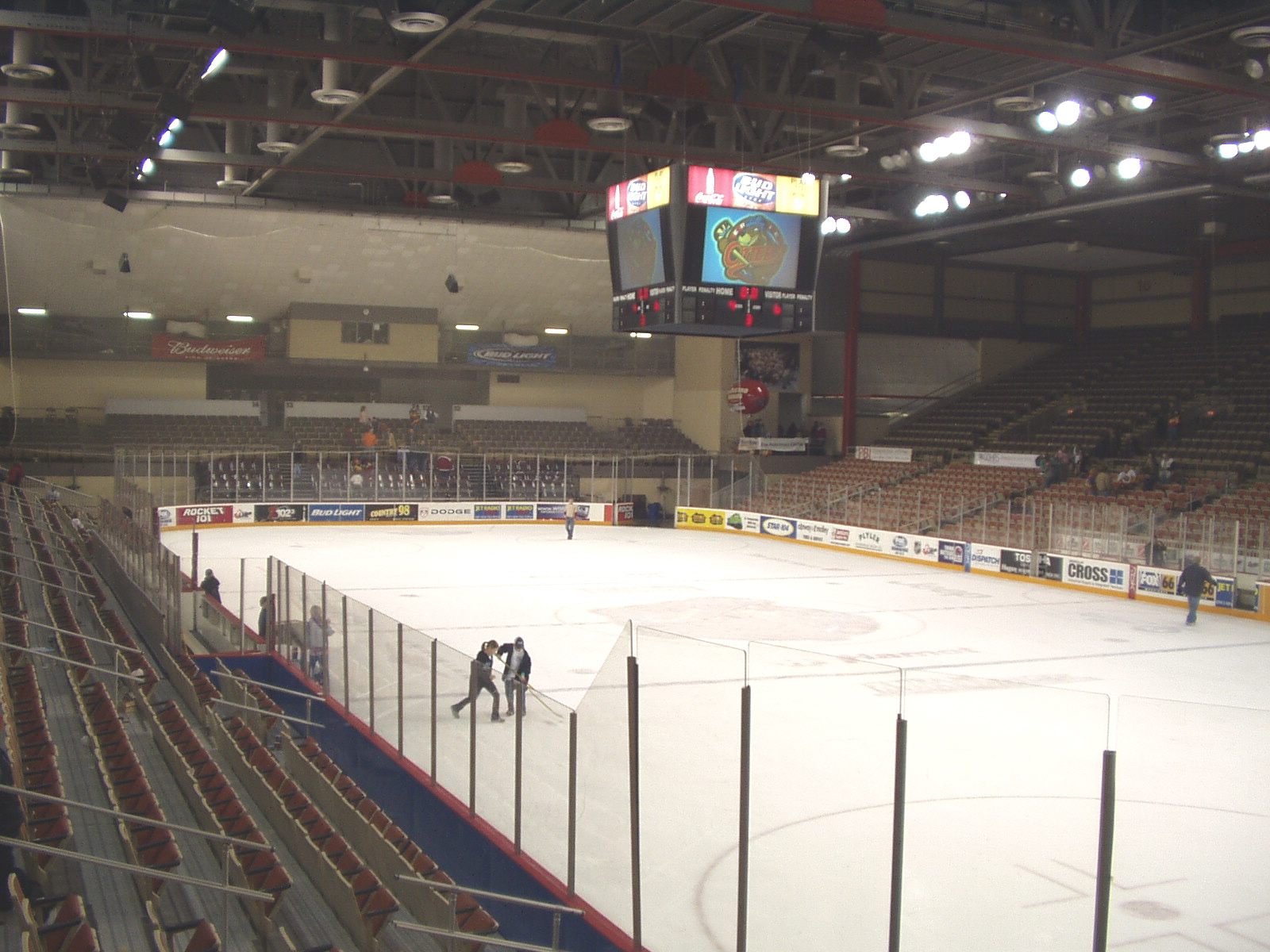
Louis J. Tullio Arena, 2008

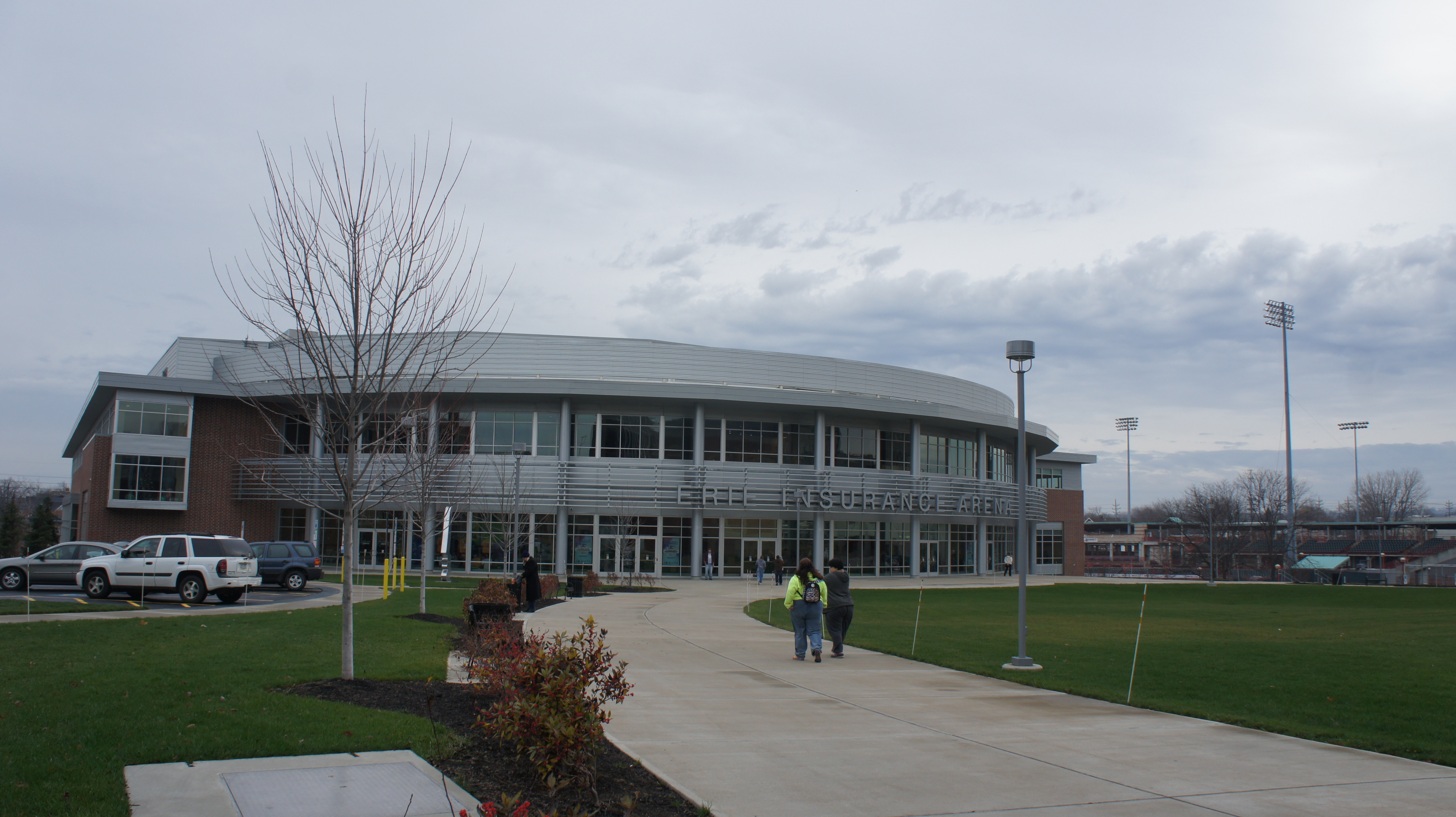
Erie Insurance Arena, 2015

== See also ==
- Bayfront Convention Center
- Erie County Field House
