= McMorran Place =

Entertainment complex in Port Huron, Michigan

Coordinates: 42°58′44″N 82°25′32″W

- McMorran
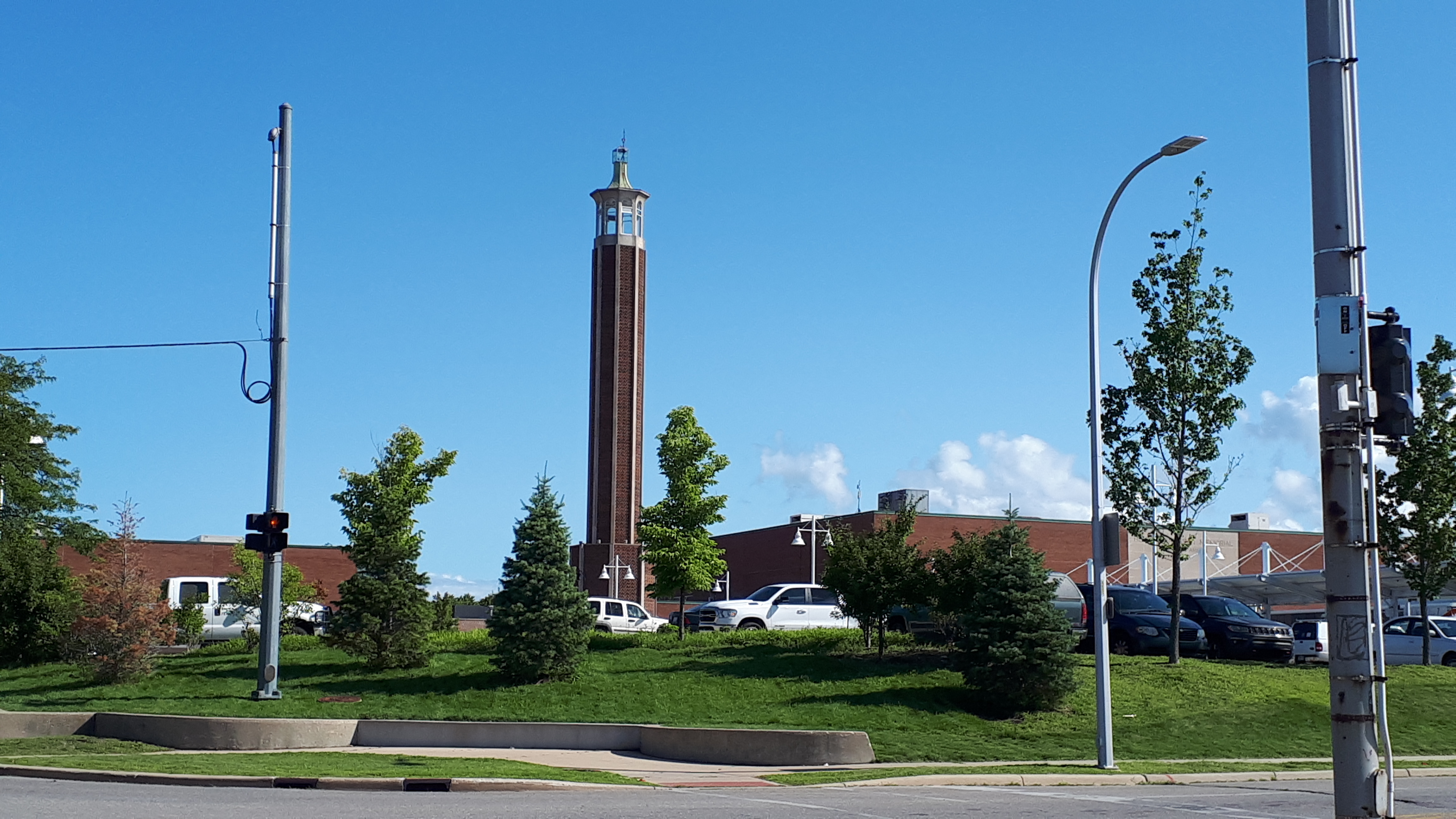
- The tower at McMorran Place.

- Location within Michigan Location within the United States
- Location: 701 McMorran Boulevard, Port Huron, Michigan 48060
- Owner: City of Port Huron, Michigan
- Operator: City of Port Huron, Michigan
- Capacity: (arena) Hockey and indoor football: 2,450; Concerts: 4,800 (theatre) 1,157
- Surface: Multi-surface

Construction
- Groundbreaking: August 24, 1958
- Opened: January 21, 1960
- Cost: 1960: $3.5 million ($38.1 million in 2025 dollars)
- Architect: Alden Dow

McMorran Place is an entertainment complex in Port Huron, Michigan consisting of a 4,800-seat multi-purpose arena and a theater. It was designed by Alden B. Dow and built in 1960 for $3.5 million (equivalent to $38.1 million in 2025). The exterior of the complex is faced with red brick with limestone accents.

== Sports ==
As of the 2015–16 season, McMorran has been the home of the Port Huron Prowlers of the Federal Prospects Hockey League. Previous hockey tenants include the Port Huron Flags (various incarnations), Port Huron Wings, Port Huron Border Cats, Port Huron Beacons, Port Huron IceHawks, and Port Huron Fighting Falcons.

== Arena ==
The arena seats 2,200 for ice hockey and indoor football, and 4,800 for concerts. The arena floor measures 85 by 185 feet (26 by 56 m). The dasher boards have 8-foot (2.4 m) glass on the ends and 4-foot (1.2 m) glass on the sides for ice hockey. The arena is also used for conventions, circuses, ice shows, trade shows, and banquets, among other events. The arena has hosted many major headlining musicians throughout the years such as Kiss, Aerosmith, Ted Nugent, Van Halen, Bon Jovi, Rush, Ozzy Osbourne, Johnny Cash.

The 1998 opening of RBC Centre in Sarnia, Ontario sent most of the arena's concert business across the St. Clair River, which separates Port Huron from Sarnia. However, in 2010 McMorran started to rejuvenate its concert lineup with the band Third Eye Blind. In 2012, McMorran Arena and the adjacent pavilion were used for the Devil's Asylum haunted house. As a result, the Fighting Falcons began their season on the road.

In November 2019, the arena received a donation of 3,000 seats from the shuttered Palace of Auburn Hills. Although the seats were free, the city had to bear the cost to move and install them. The city planned to remove the original wooden seats and have the new padded seats in place by summer 2020. The seats were one of several upgrades to the facility which included work on sound and electrical equipment in the theatre, carpeting, signage and a plan to reconfigure the plaza east of the building to accommodate an outdoor ice rink and gathering space for events.

== Pavilion ==
The pavilion features 25,000 square feet (2,300 m^{2}) of space for sporting events, trade shows, banquets, meetings, and conventions. In 2016, the city of Port Huron sold the pavilion to St. Clair County Community College for $1. Following the transaction, the Port Huron Minor Hockey Association, which was housed at the Pavilion, merged with the Blue Water Hockey Association, which is based in the city's Glacier Pointe Ice Complex. SC4 renovated the building, which opened that October as the SC4 Fieldhouse. It serves as the home to SC4's athletic teams and will be available for community use, hosting tournaments, showcases and camps in various sports and at various levels. Attached to the pavilion is an octagonal tower which boasts an observation deck at its top. Visitors can climb the 188 steps to the top to see unobstructed views of the entire area. As part of the 2016 renovations, the college installed new accent lighting on the tower's exterior.

== Theatre ==
The 1,157-seat theatre is used for Broadway shows, movies, concerts, and other stage events. It features excellent acoustics and sight lines and also was designed by Alden B. Dow. It is home to the International Symphony Orchestra and the Port Huron Civic Theatre.

In addition, the complex houses a meeting room and lounge. The exterior of the east wall features a 22-foot-diameter (6.7 m) clock of gold anodized aluminum set among limestone panels and serving as a backdrop for the Night and Day Fountain. Both are by sculptor Marshall Fredericks.

== See also ==
- List of concert halls
