= Dow Event Center =

Ice Hockey and Convention venue in Saginaw, Michigan

Coordinates: 43°26′09.50″N 83°56′12.80″W

The Dow Event Center
- "The Dow"
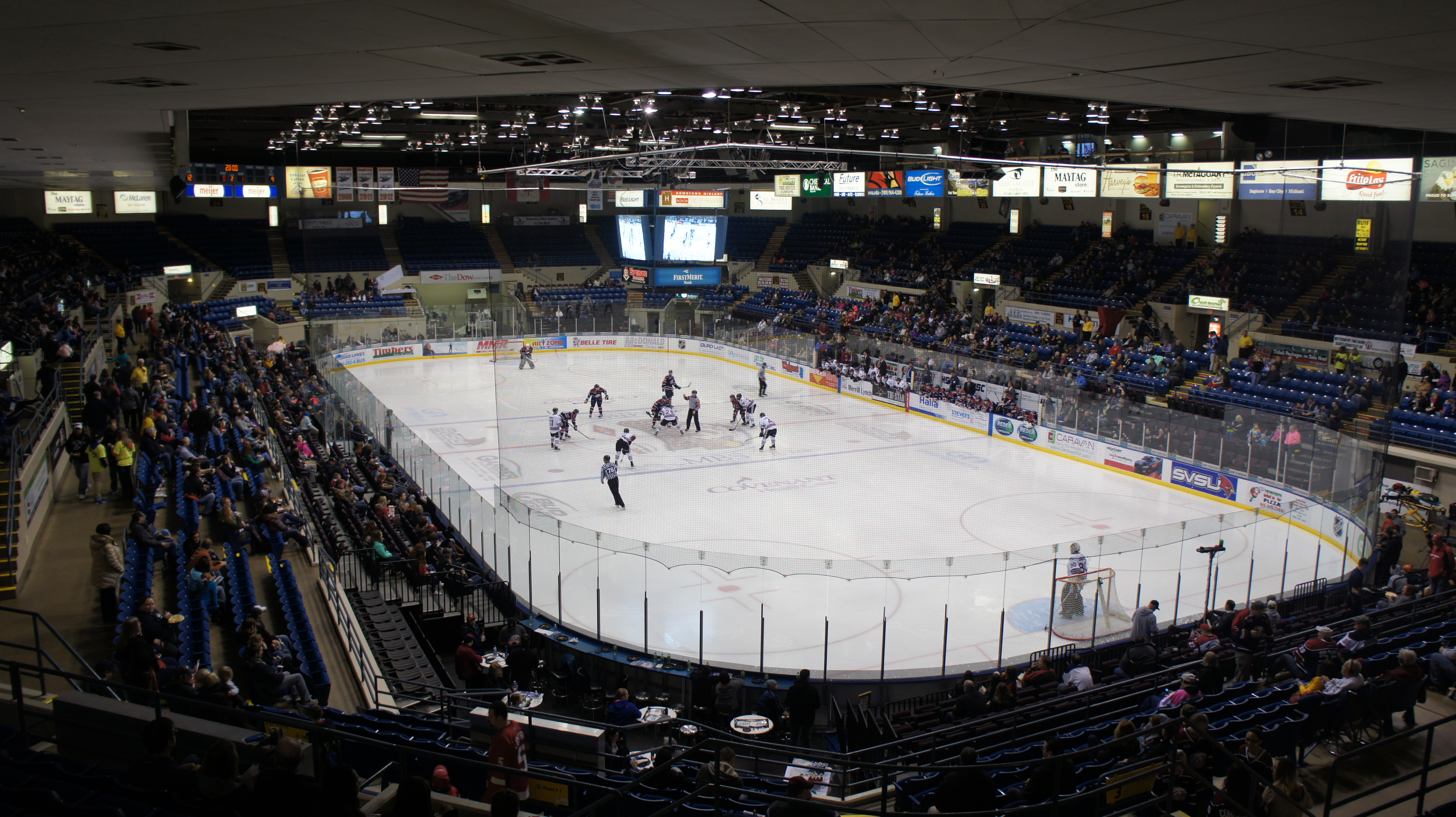

- Location within Michigan Location within the United States
- Former names: The Saginaw County Event Center; Saginaw Civic Center
- Location: 303 Johnson Street; Saginaw, Michigan 48607-1213
- Owner: Saginaw County
- Operator: SMG
- Capacity: Concerts: 7,647; Basketball: 6,217; Hockey 5,527; Indoor Football 5,201

Construction
- Groundbreaking: 1970
- Opened: 1972
- Renovated: 2003
- Cost: $17 million (renovation) ($29.8 million in 2025 dollars)
- Architects: Wigen, Tincknell, Meyer & Associates, Inc.

Tenants
- Saginaw Gears (IHL) (1972–1983); Mid-Michigan Great Lakers (GBA) (1991–1992); Saginaw Wheels/Lumber Kings/Gears (CoHL/UHL) (1994–1999); Saginaw Spirit (OHL) (2002–present); Saginaw Sting (CIFL/IFL/UIFL/AIF) (2008–2009, 2011–2015); Michigan Arsenal (AF1) (2026–)

Dow Event Center (formerly known as Saginaw County Event Center and Saginaw Civic Center) is an indoor arena located in Saginaw, Michigan. The center consists of several parts: The Atrium, The Garden Room, The Theater, The Red Room, Jolt Event Park, and The Arena. It currently houses the Ontario Hockey League's Saginaw Spirit. The facility has housed a number of hockey teams in the past, such as the Saginaw Lumber Kings and both the IHL and UHL incarnations of the Saginaw Gears.

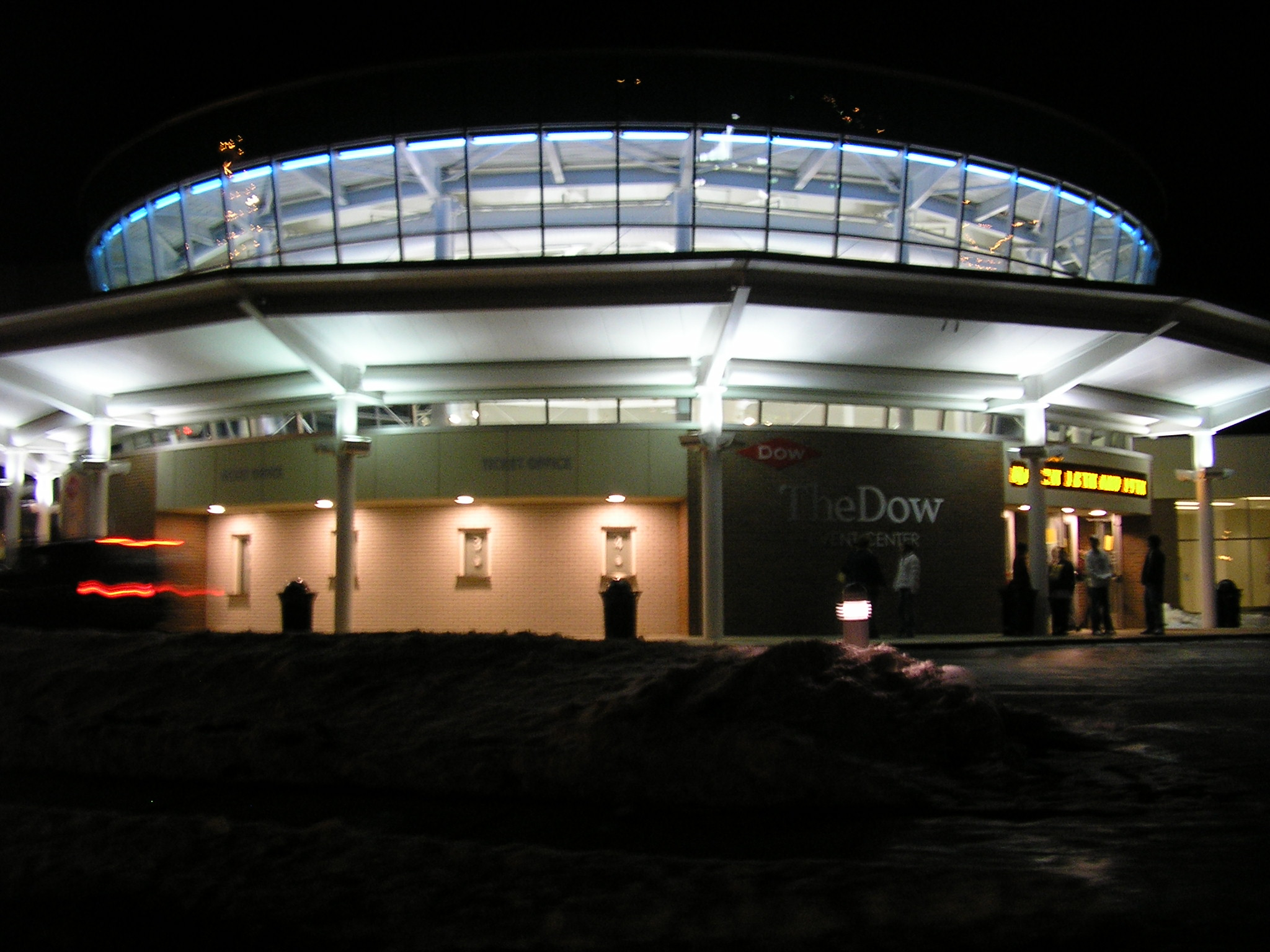
Exterior

The Arena At The Dow Event Center has a capacity of 7,600 people for concerts (without the ice), and 5,500 for hockey games. The Theater at the Dow Event Center has a capacity of 2,276 people.

Originally built in 1972 as part of an urban development program, the center is the only structure left. Most of the other buildings were razed in the 1980s due to many problems, including health risks, foreclosure and bankruptcy.

For a time in the 1990s, the facility nearly faced foreclosure and bankruptcy due to lack of funds provided by the city. The facility underwent a series of renovations in early 2000s, mainly in hopes for a better facility to host their newly acquired hockey team. The naming rights of the facility were transferred in September 2004 to The Dow Chemical Company, headquartered in nearby Midland. The center was used two times during the summer of 2004 as a center for Republican political rallies in support for the re-election of U.S. President George W. Bush.

Voters transferred the ownership from the City of Saginaw to Saginaw County on May 8, 2001. The city then closed the facility on June 30, 2001, and the county reopened it on July 1. The county then appointed SMG Worldwide to manage the facility, and started updating and renovating the building. The total cost of the renovations was tagged at $17 million, and they were completed in 2003.

The center hosts many events, concerts, political rallies, and graduations. Trade shows also take place there; the complex has 25,000 square feet (2,300 m^{2}) of space at Wendler Arena.

It hosted the third WWF In Your House pay-per-view on September 24, 1995.

Jehovah's Witnesses District Conventions are held annually at the Dow Event Center. Starting in mid-June, and ending in early July, three-day conventions held on every weekend in that time will occur. The Jehovah's Witnesses first started using the building in 2005, after rumors of demolition for the Pontiac Silverdome raised concern over where meetings would be held, as the Silverdome was the previous venue.

In 2024, the Dow Event Center hosted the CHL Memorial Cup with the Saginaw Spirit winning as the host team, 4-3, over the London Knights.
