= 2015 York Capitals season =

3rd season of York Capitals football

- Owner: Isaac Carn
- General manager: Donnie Parker
- Head coach: Rick Marilio
- Home stadium: York City Ice Arena

Results
- Record: 8–0
- League place: 1st
- Playoffs: Won AIF Semifinal (Panthers) 68–58; Won AIF Championship Game (Blitz) 58–30

The 2015 York Capitals season was the third season for the American Indoor Football (AIF) franchise, and their third season in the AIF.

On July 15, 2014, it was announced that Isaac Carn had purchased the Capitals from Jim Morris. Carn promptly named Eric Dorsey II the team's new coach, though Rick Marsilio was named head coach before the season started. Marsilio was an assistant for the now defunct Harrisburg Stampede, and recruited multiple Stampede players to the Capitals. The recruiting helped, as the Capitals finished the regular season 8–0, clinching the 1 seed in the 2015 AIF Playoffs. The Capitals defeated the ASI Panthers 68–58 to clinch a berth in the 2015 AIF Championship Game against the Chicago Blitz. The Capitals defeated the Blitz 58–30, capturing their first-ever championship.

== Regular season ==
=== Schedule ===
Week	Date	Kickoff	Opponent	Results		Game site
Week	Date	Kickoff	Opponent	Final score	Team record	Game site
1	Bye					
2	March 28	5:00 PM	ASI Panthers	W 50–32	1–0	York City Ice Arena
3	April 3	7:00 PM	at Saginaw Sting	W 46–33	2–0	Dow Event Center
4	April 12	6:00 PM	at ASI Panthers	W 48–34	3–0	Santander Arena
5	April 18	7:00 PM	Maryland Eagles	W 50–20	4–0	York City Ice Arena
6	April 25	7:00 PM	Lancaster Chargers	W 72–12	5–0	York City Ice Arena
7	May 2	7:00 PM	at Buffalo Lightning	W 34–7	6–0	Cattaraugus Community Center
8	Bye					
9	May 17	6:00 PM	at ASI Panthers	W 54–20	7–0	Santander Arena
10	May 23	7:00 PM	Cleveland Saints	W 40–6	8–0	York City Ice Arena

=== Standings ===
2015 American Indoor Football
Team	W	L	T	PCT	PF	PA	PF (Avg.)	PA (Avg.)	STK
y-York Capitals	8	0	0	1.000	394	164	49.3	20.5	W8
x-Saginaw Sting	6	2	0	.750	402	217	57.4	31.0	W6
x-Chicago Blitz	6	2	0	.750	318	187	45.4	26.7	W2
x-ASI Panthers	5	3	0	.625	356	218	44.5	18.2	W1
Savannah Steam	5	2	0	.714	232	131	33.2	18.7	W2
Atlanta Sharks	1	2	0	.333	46	112	15.3	37.3	L2
Buffalo Lightning	1	7	0	.125	184	471	23.0	58.9	L4
Maryland Eagles	0	3	0	.000	44	120	14.7	40.0	L3
Cleveland Saints	0	8	0	.000	128	424	16.0	53.0	L8

== Postseason ==
Round	Date	Kickoff	Opponent	Results		Game site
Round	Date	Kickoff	Opponent	Final score	Team record	Game site
AIF Semifinals	May 30	7:00 PM	ASI Panthers	W 68–58	1–0	York City Ice Arena
AIF Championship Game	June 6	7:00 PM	Chicago Blitz	W 58–30	2–0	York City Ice Arena

== Roster ==
2015 York Capitals roster
Quarterbacks: -- Kevin Clancy; 6 Andre Coles; 4 E. J. Nemeth; Running backs: -- Sarron Anderson; 10 Akiel Smalley; 35 Matthew Winger; Wide receivers: -- Malik Generett; 7 Rob Jones; -- Darrell Smith; 12 Keith Stokes; -- Dijon Thomas; 9 Collin Wallace; 3 Rob Wright	Offensive linemen: -- Adrian Brown; -- Eric Pratt; -- Victor Sesay; -- Jason Townson; Defensive linemen: -- Eric Ducksworth; 95 Javon Matthews; 94 Jared Sampson	Linebackers: 45 Issa Diarra; -- Chaz Robinson; 8 Jermaine Thaxton; -- Mike Woodhouse; Defensive backs: -- Akeem Green; -- Bryant Lewis; 20 Jimmy Pitts; -- Travis Proctor; 5 Armar Watson; Kickers: -- Marc Gottfried; 27 John Moorhead	Injured reserve: currently vacant; Exempt list: currently vacant; Rookies in italics Roster updated March 26, 2015; 30 Active, 0 Inactive
