= 2015 Chicago Blitz season =

- Owner: Mike Oliver
- General manager: Tom Gosche
- Head coach: Mike Oliver
- Home stadium: Odeum Expo Center; 1033 North Villa Avenue; Villa Park, IL 60181

Results
- Record: 6-2
- League place: 3rd
- Playoffs: Won AIF Semifinals (Sting) 63-45; Lost 2015 AIF Championship Game (Capitals) 30-58

The 2015 Chicago Blitz season was the second season for the American Indoor Football (AIF) franchise, and their first season in the AIF.

On October 4, 2014, the Blitz announced they were joining X-League Indoor Football for the 2015 season. Shortly after, the team was removed from the X-League website, and was no longer affiliated with the X-League. On October 15, 2014, the Blitz joined American Indoor Football (AIF), following former CIFL team, the Sting. The Blitz finished the regular season 6-2, earning the 3 seed in the AIF playoffs. They defeated the 2nd seeded Saginaw Sting 63-45 in the AIF semifinals, earning a berth in the 2015 AIF Championship Game. The Blitz traveled to York, Pennsylvania to take on the York Capitals for the AIF crown. The Blitz fell to the Capitals 30-58.

== Regular season ==
=== Schedule ===
Week	Date	Kickoff	Opponent	Results		Game site
Week	Date	Kickoff	Opponent	Final score	Team record	Game site
1	March 21	8:00 PM CST	at Cleveland Saints	W 46-24	1-0	Multiplex
2	March 29	4:15 PM CST	Buffalo Lightning	W 85-9	2-0	Odeum Expo Center
3	April 4	TBA	Cleveland Saints	W 42-0	3-0	Odeum Expo Center
4	Bye					
5	April 18	TBA	at Buffalo Lightning	W 36-20	4-0	TBD
6	April 25	TBA	at Saginaw Sting	L 40-55	4-1	Dow Event Center
7	May 2	TBA	Saginaw Sting	L 23-57	4-2	Odeum Expo Center
8	May 9	TBA	at Cleveland Saints	W 54-17	5-2	Multiplex
9	May 16	TBA	Atlanta Sharks	W Forfeit	6-2	Odeum Expo Center
10	Bye					

=== Standings ===
2015 American Indoor Football
Team	W	L	T	PCT	PF	PA	PF (Avg.)	PA (Avg.)	STK
y-York Capitals	8	0	0	1.000	394	164	49.3	20.5	W8
x-Saginaw Sting	6	2	0	.750	402	217	57.4	31.0	W6
x-Chicago Blitz	6	2	0	.750	318	187	45.4	26.7	W2
x-ASI Panthers	5	3	0	.625	356	218	44.5	18.2	W1
Savannah Steam	5	2	0	.714	232	131	33.2	18.7	W2
Atlanta Sharks	1	2	0	.333	46	112	15.3	37.3	L2
Buffalo Lightning	1	7	0	.125	184	471	23.0	58.9	L4
Maryland Eagles	0	3	0	.000	44	120	14.7	40.0	L3
Cleveland Saints	0	8	0	.000	128	424	16.0	53.0	L8

== Postseason ==
Round	Date	Kickoff	Opponent	Results		Game site
Round	Date	Kickoff	Opponent	Final score	Team record	Game site
AIF Semifinals	May 30	6:30 PM	at Saginaw Sting	W 63-45	1-0	Dow Event Center
AIF Championship Game	June 6	7:00 PM	at York Capitals	L 30-58	1-1	York City Ice Arena

== Roster ==
2015 Chicago Blitz roster
Quarterbacks: 14 Dominique Banks; 6 Jimmy Coy; Running backs: 3 Bryant Pascascio; 5 C. J. Woodford; Wide receivers: 11 David Brown; 7 Rodney Brown Jr.; 22 Josh Hampton; 1 Anthony Hughes; 4 Shawn McKeown; 2 Brian Miles	Offensive linemen: 64 Robert Albano; 55 Tim Mueller; -- Demitrious Powell; -- Moak Te'o; -- Nick Torresso; 77 David Williams; Defensive linemen: 18 Ramon Lacey; 8 DeAndre Mosley; 90 Ryan O'Neil; 93 Tyrone Saunders; -- Nick White; 30 Neil Wilcox	Linebackers: 19 Rod Harrington; -- Kevin Morris Sr.; Defensive backs: -- Bruce Cabell; 26 Steve Drain; 21 Calvin Grant; 13 Mitchell Moore; 24 Chris Muhammad; -- Keith Woodson; Kickers: 9 Julie Harshbarger	Injured Reserve: 7 Tommy Kudyba QB (IR); Exempt List: currently vacant; Practice squad: currently vacant; rookies in italics Roster updated March 19, 2015; 29 Active, 0 Inactive → More rosters
