= 2015 ASI Panthers season =

- Owner: Bill Mattis
- General manager: Will Mattis
- Head coach: Bernie Nowotarski
- Home stadium: Santander Arena; 700 Penn Street; Reading, PA 19602

Results
- Record: 5-3
- Conference place: 4th
- Playoffs: Lost AIF Semifinals (Capitals) 58-68

The 2015 ASI Panthers season was the first season for the American Indoor Football (AIF) franchise, and their first and only season in the AIF.

On October 10, 2014, American Indoor Football (AIF) announced that the ASI Panthers would be joining the league as part 2015 expansion. The Panthers were officially announced as a 2015 expansion team of the AIF in November, 2014.

== Regular season ==
=== Schedule ===
Week	Date	Kickoff	Opponent	Results		Game site
Week	Date	Kickoff	Opponent	Final score	Team record	Game site
1	March 20	TBA	at Saginaw Sting	W 35-29	1-0	Dow Event Center
2	March 28	5:00pm	at York Capitals	L 32-50	1-1	York City Ice Arena
3	April 4	TBA	Buffalo Lightning	W 53-13	2-1	Santander Arena
4	April 12	TBA	York Capitals	L 34-48	2-2	Santander Arena
5	April 19	TBA	Cleveland Saints	W 73-6	3-2	Santander Arena
6	April 25	7:00 p.m.	at Erie Explosion (interleague)	L 26-50	3-2	Erie Insurance Arena
7	May 3	TBA	Savannah Steam	W 46-6	4-2	Santander Arena
8	Bye					
9	May 17	TBA	York Capitals	L 20-54	4-3	Santander Arena
10	May 23	TBA	at Buffalo Lightning	W 60-12	5-3	Cattaraugus Community Center

=== Standings ===
2015 American Indoor Football
Team	W	L	T	PCT	PF	PA	PF (Avg.)	PA (Avg.)	STK
y-York Capitals	8	0	0	1.000	394	164	49.3	20.5	W8
x-Saginaw Sting	6	2	0	.750	402	217	57.4	31.0	W6
x-Chicago Blitz	6	2	0	.750	318	187	45.4	26.7	W2
x-ASI Panthers	5	3	0	.625	356	218	44.5	18.2	W1
Savannah Steam	5	2	0	.714	232	131	33.2	18.7	W2
Atlanta Sharks	1	2	0	.333	46	112	15.3	37.3	L2
Buffalo Lightning	1	7	0	.125	184	471	23.0	58.9	L4
Maryland Eagles	0	3	0	.000	44	120	14.7	40.0	L3
Cleveland Saints	0	8	0	.000	128	424	16.0	53.0	L8

== Postseason ==
Round	Date	Kickoff	Opponent	Results		Game site
Round	Date	Kickoff	Opponent	Final score	Team record	Game site
AIF Semifinals	May 30	7:00 PM	at York Capitals	L 58-68	0-1	York City Ice Arena

== Roster ==
2015 ASI Panthers roster
Quarterbacks: 17 Kris Brownlee; 12 Jim McCreery; 8 Ray Wagner; Running backs: 25 Chad Rice; 21 Perry Smith; Wide receivers: 0 Deven Baker; 7 Devron Clark; 30 Eric Foxsworth; 4 Darryl Shine; 5 Tyriq Smith; 6 Ed Williams; 11 Kyle Williams	Offensive linemen: 69 Raquale Burnett; 75 Mohamed Kourouma; 63 Darryl Pringle; 66 Jaleel Taylor; Defensive linemen: 15 Jonas Celian; 98 Todd George; 40 Tom Herd; 19 Time Hume; 99 Abe Koroma	Linebackers: 2 Kieron Hutcherson; 34 Herschel Thornton; Defensive backs: 9 Jarard Stewart; 1 Troy Still; 16 Jamil Williams; 3 John Williams; Kickers: 10 Charlie Cornell	Injured Reserve: currently vacant; Exempt List: currently vacant; Practice squad: currently vacant; rookies in italics Roster updated April 15, 2015; 28 Active, 0 Inactive → More rosters
