= 2015 Cleveland Saints season =

- Head coach: Fred Johnson
- Home stadium: Multiplex; 18909 South Miles Road; Warrensville Heights, OH 44128

Results
- Record: 0–8
- League place: 9th
- Playoffs: did not qualify

The 2015 Cleveland Saints season was the first season for the American Indoor Football (AIF) expansion franchise, and their first season in the AIF.

== Schedule ==
=== Regular season ===
Week	Date	Kickoff	Opponent	Results		Game site
Week	Date	Kickoff	Opponent	Final score	Team record	Game site
1	March 21	9:00 PM EDT	Chicago Blitz	L 24–46	0–1	Multiplex
2	March 28	7:00 PM EDT	Savannah Steam	L 15–44	0–2	Multiplex
3	April 4	TBA	at Chicago Blitz	L 0–42	0–3	Odeum Expo Center
4	April 11	7:30 PM EST	at Saginaw Sting	L 6–74	0–4	Dow Event Center
5	April 19	TBA	at ASI Panthers	L 6–73	0–5	Santander Arena
6	April 25	TBA	Buffalo Lightning	L 52–56	0–6	Multiplex
7	Bye					
8	May 9	TBA	Chicago Blitz	L 17–54	0–7	Multiplex
9	Bye					
10	May 23	TBA	at York Capitals	L 6–40	0–8	York City Ice Arena

=== Standings ===
2015 American Indoor Football
Team	W	L	T	PCT	PF	PA	PF (Avg.)	PA (Avg.)	STK
y-York Capitals	8	0	0	1.000	394	164	49.3	20.5	W8
x-Saginaw Sting	6	2	0	.750	402	217	57.4	31.0	W6
x-Chicago Blitz	6	2	0	.750	318	187	45.4	26.7	W2
x-ASI Panthers	5	3	0	.625	356	218	44.5	18.2	W1
Savannah Steam	5	2	0	.714	232	131	33.2	18.7	W2
Atlanta Sharks	1	2	0	.333	46	112	15.3	37.3	L2
Buffalo Lightning	1	7	0	.125	184	471	23.0	58.9	L4
Maryland Eagles	0	3	0	.000	44	120	14.7	40.0	L3
Cleveland Saints	0	8	0	.000	128	424	16.0	53.0	L8

== Roster ==
2015 Cleveland Saints roster
Quarterbacks: 3 D. J. Barney; 16 David Thompson; Running backs: 9 Tazz Jackson; Wide receivers: 14 Jeremy Chapman; 6 Cameron Jackson; 10 Justin Mott; 2 Chris Netters; 18 Abrielle Taylor	Offensive linemen: 95 Chris Hardy; 73 Marshall Dillon; 79 Devonne McKinney; 74 Chris Saunders; Defensive linemen: 98 Marcus Allen; 13 Brian Carothers; 10 Justin Mott; 57 Tim Weeks	Linebackers: 15 Charles Pugh; Defensive backs: 21 Brian Darden; 23 Frankel Matlock; 1 Geno Trundle; 19 Dereck Vacha; Kickers: 19 Derek Metcalf	Injured reserve: currently vacant; Exempt list: currently vacant; Rookies in italics Roster updated April 7, 2015; 22 Active, 0 Inactive → More rosters
