= 2015 Saginaw Sting season =

- Owner: Stuart Schweigert, Rob Licht & Tom O'Brien
- General manager: Rob Licht
- Head coach: Greg Wasmer (fired on April 7, 0-2 record); Stuart Schweigert (interim)
- Home stadium: Dow Event Center; 303 Johnson Street; Saginaw, MI 78607

Results
- Record: 6-2
- League place: 2nd
- Playoffs: Lost Semifinals 45-63 (Blitz)

The 2015 Saginaw Sting season was the seventh season for the American Indoor Football (AIF) franchise, and their first season in the AIF.

In October 2014, the Sting announced they would be joining American Indoor Football (AIF). The Sting also announced the hiring of Greg Wasmer as the franchise's new head coach. After a 0-2 start for the Sting, Wasmer was fired and owner Stuart Schweigert was named the head coach of the Sting.

== Regular season ==
=== Schedule ===
Week	Date	Kickoff	Opponent	Results		Game site
Week	Date	Kickoff	Opponent	Final score	Team record	Game site
1	March 20	7:30 P.M. EST	ASI Panthers	L 29-35	0-1	Dow Event Center
2	Bye					
3	April 3	7:30 P.M. EST	York Capitals	L 33-46	0-2	Dow Event Center
4	April 11	7:30 P.M. EST	Cleveland Saints	W 74-6	1-2	Dow Event Center
5	April 18	7:00 P.M. EST	at Alabama Hammers	L 40-55	(exhibition)	Von Braun Center
6	April 25	TBA	Chicago Blitz	W 55-40	2-2	Dow Event Center
7	May 2	TBA	at Chicago Blitz	W 57-23	3-2	Odeum Expo Center
8	March 9	TBA	Buffalo Lightning	W 79-37	4-2	Dow Event Center
9	May 16	TBA	at Buffalo Lightning	W 79-30	5-2	Cattaraugus Community Center
10	May 23	TBA	at Atlanta Sharks	W Forfeit	6-2	Creekside Sports Center

=== Standings ===
2015 American Indoor Football
Team	W	L	T	PCT	PF	PA	PF (Avg.)	PA (Avg.)	STK
y-York Capitals	8	0	0	1.000	394	164	49.3	20.5	W8
x-Saginaw Sting	6	2	0	.750	402	217	57.4	31.0	W6
x-Chicago Blitz	6	2	0	.750	318	187	45.4	26.7	W2
x-ASI Panthers	5	3	0	.625	356	218	44.5	18.2	W1
Savannah Steam	5	2	0	.714	232	131	33.2	18.7	W2
Atlanta Sharks	1	2	0	.333	46	112	15.3	37.3	L2
Buffalo Lightning	1	7	0	.125	184	471	23.0	58.9	L4
Maryland Eagles	0	3	0	.000	44	120	14.7	40.0	L3
Cleveland Saints	0	8	0	.000	128	424	16.0	53.0	L8

== Postseason ==
Round	Date	Kickoff	Opponent	Results		Game site
Round	Date	Kickoff	Opponent	Final score	Team record	Game site
AIF Semifinals	May 30	6:30 PM	Chicago Blitz	L 45-63	0-1	Dow Event Center

== Roster ==
2015 Saginaw Sting roster
Quarterbacks: 9 Stephen Kulikowski; 9 A. J. McKenna; Running backs: 34 Terrence Blevins; 20 DeShawn Hayes; Wide receivers: 1 Graylin Crawford; 7 Alex Evans; 18 Daryl Gooden; 10 Quillan Mathis	Offensive linemen: 64 Eric Brim; -- Iviunce Ezell; 50 Justin Glover; 66 Mike LeGrow; 71 Devin Smith; Defensive linemen: -- Eric Butler; 49 Desmond Kenner; 15 Albert Presley; 5 Edison Vushaj	Linebackers: 50 Marshall Brice; 3 Dwight Hartgrove; 6 LaTreze Mushatt; 4 Spencer Smith; Defensive backs: 13 Yankik George; 11 Austin Pochiano; 28 Tre Sims; 30 Taylor Stockton; 21 Bert White; 8 Virgil Williams; Kickers: 22 Josh MacIntosh	Injured Reserve: currently vacant; Exempt List: currently vacant; rookies in italics Roster updated May 1, 2015; 28 Active, 0 Inactive → More rosters

== Coaching staff ==
2015 Saginaw Sting staff
Front office: Co-Owner/General Manager – Robert Licht; Co-Owner/Director of Football Operations – Stuart Schweigert; Co-Owner/Director of Business Sales – James O'Brien; Assistant general manager – Bill Wheeler; Game Day Operations Director - Jamie Sochocki; Front Office Manager - Tori Seymour	Head coach: Head Coach - Stuart Schweigert; Offensive coaches: Offensive Coordinator -; Offensive Line –; Defensive coaches: Defensive Coordinator -; Defensive Line –
