= Jacob Bender =

American football player (born 1985)

No. 72, 78
- Position: Guard / Offensive tackle

Personal information
- Born: April 25, 1985 (age 41); Mayo, Maryland, U.S.
- Listed height: 6 ft 6 in (1.98 m)
- Listed weight: 315 lb (143 kg)

Career information
- High school: DeMatha Catholic (Hyattsville, Maryland)
- College: Nicholls State
- NFL draft: 2007: 6th round, 177th overall pick

Career history
- New York Jets (2007); New England Patriots (2008)*; San Francisco 49ers (2008); New York Giants (2009–2010)*; New Orleans Saints (2010)*; Hartford Colonials (2010); Washington Redskins (2010)*; Carolina Panthers (2010–2011)*; York Capitals (2014)
- * Offseason or practice squad member only

Career NFL statistics
- Games played: 2
- Stats at Pro Football Reference

Jacob David Bender (born April 25, 1985) is an American former professional football player who was a guard and offensive tackle in the National Football League (NFL) and United Football League (UFL). He was selected by the New York Jets in the sixth round in the 2007 NFL draft. He played college football at Nicholls State University.

Bender was also a member of the New England Patriots, San Francisco 49ers, New York Giants, New Orleans Saints, Hartford Colonials, Washington Redskins, Carolina Panthers and York Capitals.

== Early life ==
Bender played high school football under Bill McGregor at the prestigious DeMatha Catholic High School in Hyattsville.

== College career ==
In 2004, Bender took over as the starting left tackle at Nicholls State, started every game during his career and became an All-Southland Conference selection. In the 2005 season Bender started every game and became an All-Southland Conference first-team and All-Louisiana second-team selection after allowing only 1.5 sacks, 76 pancake blocks, and 8 touchdown resulting blocks. In his final season of 2006, Bender was once again named to the All-Southland Conference and All-Louisiana teams after recording 87 pancake blocks, 8 touchdown resulting blocks and 0 sacks allowed.

== Professional career ==
=== New York Jets ===
Bender was drafted 177th overall by the Jets in the sixth round of the 2007 NFL Draft. He was active for two games for the Jets in the 2007 season, and was waived by the team on August 30, 2008.

=== New England Patriots ===
Bender was signed to the practice squad of the New England Patriots on September 1, 2008. He remained there until he was signed by the San Francisco 49ers on November 18.

=== San Francisco 49ers ===
Bender was signed by the San Francisco 49ers off the New England Patriots' practice squad on November 18, 2008 when offensive tackle Jonas Jennings was placed on injured reserve.

=== New York Giants ===
After being cut by the 49ers on September 5, 2009, Bender was signed to the New York Giants practice squad on September 16. On January 5, 2010 Bender was signed to a reserved/future contract. On September 4, 2010, Bender was waived by the Giants.

=== New Orleans Saints ===
Bender was signed to the New Orleans Saints practice squad on September 13, 2010.

=== Washington Redskins ===
Bender was signed to the Washington Redskins practice squad on November 23, 2010.

=== Carolina Panthers ===
On December 29, 2010, Bender was signed by the Panthers to their practice squad. His contract was extended on January 14, 2011. He was cut on September 3, 2011.

=== York Capitals ===
Bender started playing for the York Capitals of American Indoor Football in 2014.
