= 2015 Buffalo Lightning season =

- Owner: John Augustine; Bob Guenther
- Head coach: Willie Burnett
- Home stadium: Cattaraugus Community Center; 12767 Route 438; Irving, NY 14081

Results
- Record: 1-7
- League place: 7th
- Playoffs: did not qualify

The 2015 Buffalo Lightning season was the first season for the American Indoor Football (AIF) expansion franchise, and their first season in the AIF.

== Schedule ==
=== Regular season ===
Week	Date	Kickoff	Opponent	Results		Game site
Week	Date	Kickoff	Opponent	Final score	Team record	Game site
1	Bye					
2	March 29	5:15 PM EDT	at Chicago Blitz	L 9-85	0-1	Odeum Expo Center
3	April 4	TBA	at ASI Panthers	L 13-53	0-2	Santander Arena
4	Bye					
5	April 18	TBA	Chicago Blitz	L 20-36	0-3	Cattaraugus Community Center
6	April 25	TBA	at Cleveland Saints	W 56-52	1-3	Multiplex
7	May 2	TBA	York Capitals	L 7-34	1-4	Cattaraugus Community Center
8	May 9	TBA	at Saginaw Sting	L 37-79	1-5	Dow Event Center
9	May 16	TBA	Saginaw Sting	L 30-79	1-6	Cattaraugus Community Center
10	May 23	TBD	ASI Panthers	L 12-60	1-7	Cattaraugus Community Center

=== Standings ===
2015 American Indoor Football
Team	W	L	T	PCT	PF	PA	PF (Avg.)	PA (Avg.)	STK
y-York Capitals	8	0	0	1.000	394	164	49.3	20.5	W8
x-Saginaw Sting	6	2	0	.750	402	217	57.4	31.0	W6
x-Chicago Blitz	6	2	0	.750	318	187	45.4	26.7	W2
x-ASI Panthers	5	3	0	.625	356	218	44.5	18.2	W1
Savannah Steam	5	2	0	.714	232	131	33.2	18.7	W2
Atlanta Sharks	1	2	0	.333	46	112	15.3	37.3	L2
Buffalo Lightning	1	7	0	.125	184	471	23.0	58.9	L4
Maryland Eagles	0	3	0	.000	44	120	14.7	40.0	L3
Cleveland Saints	0	8	0	.000	128	424	16.0	53.0	L8

== Roster ==
2015 Buffalo Lightning roster
Quarterbacks: 17 Tony DeMartino; -- Jay Rizzo; Running backs: 34 Felix Joyner; -- Nick Martone; Wide receivers: -- Gabriel Chambers; 83 Brian Goldsmith; 3 Kelvin McCullough	Offensive linemen: 59 Robert McCall; Defensive linemen: -- Ray Barker; -- Brock Janoski; 55 Gorden Schubert	Linebackers: -- Dave Cuthbertson; -- Mike McKinnon; 21 Jeff Hand; -- Russell Terry; Defensive backs: -- Lamonte Hudson; -- Zach Johnson; -- Lavone Nelson; 20 Shawn McGee; Kickers: 15 Jimmy Allen	Injured Reserve: 14 Darrik Bloomfield WR; -- Rick Krantz QB; Exempt List: 2 Steffen Colon QB; rookies in italics Roster updated May 12, 2015; 20 Active, 3 Inactive → More rosters
