= Buffalo Blitz =

American indoor football team

Logo

General information
- Founded: 2014
- Folded: 2017
- Headquartered: Buffalo, New York at Buffalo RiverWorks
- Colors: Red, blue, gold, white
- BuffaloBlitzIndoorFootball.com

Personnel
- Owners: John Augustine; Bob Guenther
- Head coach: Doby Howard

Team history
- Buffalo Lightning (2015–2016); Buffalo Blitz (2017)

Home fields
- Cattaraugus Community Center (2015–2016); Buffalo RiverWorks (2017)

League / conference affiliations
- American Indoor Football (2015); Can-Am Indoor Football League (2017)

Playoff appearances (1)
- Can-Am: 2017

The Buffalo Blitz was a professional indoor football team based in Buffalo, New York. The club was established in 2014 as the Buffalo Lightning, an expansion team in American Indoor Football for the 2015 season. Playing as an independent in 2016 and as a member of the Can-Am Indoor Football League, the team ceased operations following the 2017 season.

== History ==
In April 2014, it was announced that American Indoor Football would be coming to the Buffalo, New York, market. John Augustine, a longtime figure associated with the semi-professional Buffalo Gladiators of the Northeastern Football Alliance, is leading the Lightning (the team was initially identified as the “Gladiators” in the earliest mentions, but that team name was removed and eventually replaced by Lightning well before the 2015 season). On March 2, 2015, the team announced that the Cattaraugus Community Center, a Seneca Nation-owned facility primarily used for box lacrosse and located on the Cattaraugus Reservation in Irving, New York, 30 miles south of Buffalo, would be their home venue for the 2015 season.

The Lightning jumped to the Supreme Indoor Football for the 2016 season, however, the league abruptly broke down in winter 2016 before it began play. The Lightning still intended on playing a 2016 season independent of a league against teams assembled as the year progressed. The Lightning's season began April 30, 2016.

Some time after the 2016 season, the team's webmaster lost contact with the team after failing to get payment for his services and left a disparaging (and misspelled) manifesto mocking the team's management on their Web site. In late November, the webmaster received his payment, the manifesto was removed, and the team announced that, despite financial losses, the team would play a 2017 season.

The team indicated they would not return to the Cattaraugus Community Center, instead securing a "better" arena. In November 2016, the Can-Am Indoor Football League confirmed that the Lightning would be members of their league and that their new "arena" would be the outdoor Buffalo RiverWorks facility in the city of Buffalo. The team later announced it would be known as the Buffalo Blitz. Augustine and co-owner Bob Guenther plan on investing $75,000 to build a 2,500-seat temporary stadium at RiverWorks, with seating and fresh artificial turf.

After the 2017 season, the American Arena League announced the Blitz were among the original teams listed for the newly-merged league on the league website. However, the team was later removed from the website before the 2018 season and has appeared to have ceased operations.

== Players of note ==
=== All-League players ===
The following Lightning players have been named to All-League Teams:

- K Jimmy Allen (1)
- WR Ryan Travers (1)

== Head coaches ==
Note: Statistics are correct as of the 2017 season.

Name	Term	Regular season				Playoffs		Awards
Name	Term	W	L	T	Win%	W	L	Awards
Willie Burnett	2015	1	7	0	.125	0	0	
Mook Zimmerman	2016	2	0	0	1.000	0	0	
A'Donnis "Doby" Howard	2017	2	3	0	.400	0	1	

== Season-by-season results ==
League champions	Conference champions	Division champions	Wild card berth	League leader

Season	Team	League	Conference	Division	Regular season				Postseason results
Season	Team	League	Conference	Division	Finish	Wins	Losses	Ties	Postseason results
2015	2015	AIF			7th	1	7	0	
2016	2016	IND			N/A	2	0	0	
2017	2017	Can-Am		Western	2nd, West	2	3	0	Lost to Rochester Kings in semifinals
Totals						5	10	0	All-time regular season record (2015)
Totals						0	1	-	All-time postseason record (2015)
Totals						5	11	0	All-time regular season and postseason record (2015)

=== 2016 season results ===
All games listed are home games.

- April 30, 2016: vs. Cincinnati Bulldogs, 45–0 win
- May 7, 2016: vs. Hamburg Hornets (Northeastern Football Alliance), 74–0 win

Games were also scheduled for May 14, and June 4, 13 and 23. No opponents were found for those dates and those games were assumed to be cancelled.

=== 2017 season results ===
(source: CAIFL and Buffalo Blitz official Web sites)

- April 12, 2017: vs. Niagara Falls Thunder, 37–20 win
- April 15, 2017: vs. Steel City Patriots/Ontario Niagara Spartans, 12–32 loss
- April 22, 2017: vs. Rochester Kings, 28–44 loss
- April 29, 2017: vs. Steel City Patriots/Ontario Niagara Spartans, 56–62 loss
  - NOTE: This game was officially listed in league records as a 2–0 forfeit win for the Blitz, for reasons unknown. The Blitz acknowledged the results of the game and as such, it is recorded as a loss in the standings listed above.
- May 6, 2017: vs. Glens Falls Gladiators, 21–12 win

The remainder of the team's schedule (games on May 13, 20 and 27) was not played. The May 13 game was against the Connecticut Chiefs, who folded two months prior. The May 20 game was listed by the league as also being against the Chiefs, but by the Blitz as being against the Toronto Mounties. (An all-gay traveling team bears the name, but that team is a flag football team and it is unclear whether that team is the one the Blitz referred to.) The May 27 game would have been the team's lone road game against the Patriots; the game was scrapped after the team moved its second matchup with the Blitz to Buffalo earlier in the season to fill the holes left by the nonexistence of the Cleveland Saints and the Thunder's dissolution. Team workhorse Travers accounted for 10 receiving touchdowns, 2 rushing scores and even one passing TD despite the teams poor play and was named to the allstar roster.

==== Playoffs ====
- June 3, 2017: at Rochester Kings, 12–64 loss
