= 2015 Savannah Steam season =

- Owner: Bobby Dammarell
- General manager: Jenny Dammarell
- Head coach: Bobby Dammarell
- Home stadium: DeVaul Henderson Park; 500 Veterans Memorial Parkway; Richmond Hill, GA 31324

Results
- Record: 5-2
- League place: 5th
- Playoffs: did not qualify

The 2015 Savannah Steam season was the second season for the American Indoor Football (AIF) franchise, and their first season in AIF.

== Schedule ==
=== Regular season ===
Week	Date	Kickoff	Opponent	Results		Game site
Week	Date	Kickoff	Opponent	Final score	Team record	Game site
1	Bye					
2	March 28	7:00 PM EDT	at Cleveland Saints	W 44-15	1-0	Multiplex
3	April 4	TBA	Atlanta Sharks	L 32-40	1-1	DeVaul Henderson Park
4	April 11	TBA	Atlanta Sharks	W 54-6	2-1	DeVaul Henderson Park
5	April 18	TBA	Atlanta Sharks	W 26-0	3-1	DeVaul Henderson Park
6	April 25	TBA	Maryland Eagles	W 38-12	4-1	DeVaul Henderson Park
7	May 3	TBA	at ASI Panthers	L 6-46	4-2	Santander Arena
8	May 9	TBA	Maryland Eagles*	W 32-12	5-2	DeVaul Henderson Park
9	May 16	TBA	Maryland Eagles			DeVaul Henderson Park
10	Bye					

*May 9 game was originally against the Atlanta Sharks, but due to its cancelation, the Maryland Eagles filled the Steam's schedule void.

=== Standings ===
2015 American Indoor Football
Team	W	L	T	PCT	PF	PA	PF (Avg.)	PA (Avg.)	STK
y-York Capitals	8	0	0	1.000	394	164	49.3	20.5	W8
x-Saginaw Sting	6	2	0	.750	402	217	57.4	31.0	W6
x-Chicago Blitz	6	2	0	.750	318	187	45.4	26.7	W2
x-ASI Panthers	5	3	0	.625	356	218	44.5	18.2	W1
Savannah Steam	5	2	0	.714	232	131	33.2	18.7	W2
Atlanta Sharks	1	2	0	.333	46	112	15.3	37.3	L2
Buffalo Lightning	1	7	0	.125	184	471	23.0	58.9	L4
Maryland Eagles	0	3	0	.000	44	120	14.7	40.0	L3
Cleveland Saints	0	8	0	.000	128	424	16.0	53.0	L8

== Roster ==
2015 Savannah Steam roster
Quarterbacks: 12 Jaha Taylor; Running backs: 32 Louis Bacon; 22 Troy Griffin; Wide receivers: 8 Antonio Bearden; 1 Kelvin Irving; 17 Cordrick Mobley; 7 Marquel Wade	Offensive linemen: 34 John Jackson; 25 Clyde Johnson; 66 Chad Malphrus; 46 Shawn Martinez; Defensive linemen: 9 Reggie Givens; 15 Will Hoskins	Linebackers: 2 Michael Figgers; 11 Byron Tillery; Defensive backs: 4 Kevin Cuffee; 23 Devonte Green; 24 Ken Middleton; 21 Randall Richburg; Kickers: 13 John Dukes	Injured reserve: currently vacant; Transfer list: currently vacant; Refuse to report: currently vacant; rookies in italics Roster updated April 7, 2015; 20 Active, 0 Inactive → More rosters
