= Demetrius Jones =

American football player (born 1988)

No. 2
- Position: Quarterback

Personal information
- Born: January 3, 1988 (age 38); Chicago, Illinois
- Listed height: 6 ft 4 in (1.93 m)
- Listed weight: 225 lb (102 kg)

Career information
- High school: Chicago (IL) Morgan Park
- College: Central State
- NFL draft: 2011: undrafted

Career history
- Kane County Dawgs (2013); Chicago Blitz (2016); Kansas City Chiefs (2017–2018)*; Chicago Blitz (2019)
- * Offseason or practice squad member only

Demetrius Jones (born January 3, 1988) is a former American indoor football quarterback. Jones graduated from Central State University after previously attending the University of Notre Dame at the beginning of the 2007 season, and played middle linebacker at Cincinnati from 2008-09.

== Nicknames ==
Jones used various monikers throughout his playing career, including "D-Train" and "Mo-Po Jones," a reference to Morgan Park High School. His grandmother called him "Double D," which was short for "double disaster."

== Before college ==
As a senior at Morgan Park High School, Jones threw for 2,000 yards and 25 touchdowns, and was selected to play in the 2006 U.S. Army All-American Bowl. Jones was one of seven quarterbacks named to the Parade All-American team and was the 2005 Gatorade Player of the Year for the state of Illinois. USA Today rated him 33rd nationally among all prep football players.

== College ==
As a freshman at Notre Dame, Jones saw no playing time behind senior Brady Quinn, but was twice selected by his teammates as the "show team player of the week" as he ran the opposing teams' offenses in practice. While competing to become the starting quarterback in the spring of 2007, Jones was commended by coach Charlie Weis for having "made the most plays," and in the final week of fall practice he was awarded the position.

However, in Jones's first and only game as a starter against Georgia Tech, Jones was 1-of-3 passing for 4 yards and lost two fumbles before being pulled in favor of freshman Jimmy Clausen. The following week, Jones did not make the team's bus trip to Michigan, and the sports media began to report that Jones was transferring to Northern Illinois. Initially, the Notre Dame athletic department refused to release Jones from his scholarship. However, they later permitted him to speak with Cincinnati head coach Brian Kelly, leading to Jones's subsequent transfer to the Bearcats.

After sitting out the remainder of 2007 at Cincinnati due to NCAA regulations, Jones was unable to unseat the Bearcats' starting quarterback Tony Pike and opted instead to play the middle linebacker position. In two years as a reserve, he recorded 36 tackles and an interception. Then in 2010, with the departure of Brian Kelly (who, coincidentally, accepted the head coaching position at Notre Dame), Jones decided to transfer yet again.

Jones then enrolled at Central State University in Ohio, a Division II school that is part of the Great Lakes Valley Conference, where he played as a wide receiver and tight end. In his first six games for the Marauders, he recorded 41 receptions for 410 yards and two touchdowns, and also completed 14 of 23 passes for 178 yards. Jones planned to petition for another year of eligibility after he was not invited to the NFL Scouting Combine in February 2011.

== Professional career ==
=== Kane County Dawgs ===
Jones signed with the Kane County Dawgs of the Continental Indoor Football League for their 2013 season, but when the Dawgs folded after played one game, he was released from his contract.

Windy City Ravens

In December 2014, Jones signed with the Windy City Ravens of the North American Indoor Football (NAIF) league. Jones played wide receiver, quarterback and linebacker for the team and was an integral part of the team winning with 2015 NAIF championship. Jones was awarded the teams Most Valuable Player award for the 2015 season.

=== Chicago Blitz ===
In 2016, Jones signed with the Chicago Blitz of American Indoor Football.
