= Cleveland Saints =

Former American indoor football team in Ohio

Logo

General information
- Founded: 2014
- Folded: 2015
- Headquartered: Multiplex in Warrensville Heights, Ohio
- Colors: Black, Gold, White
- ClevelandSaintsProfessionalFootball.com

Personnel
- Owners: J. Rock; Rich Owens; Patrick Smith
- Head coach: Fred Johnson
- President: Rich Owens

Team history
- Cleveland Saints (2015)

Home fields
- Multiplex (2015)

League / conference affiliations
- American Indoor Football (2015)

The Cleveland Saints were a professional indoor football team based in Warrensville Heights, Ohio. The Saints were members of American Indoor Football (AIF). The club was established in 2014 as an expansion team for the 2015 season. The Saints played their home games at the Multiplex.

== History ==
On July 31, 2014, it was announced that the Saints would be taking over the Cleveland Territory from the Cleveland Patriots, who didn't finish the 2014 season. The Saints began the season 0-5 then was taken over by new head coach and owner Marcus McIntosh whom change the team name to the Cleveland Pack. Despite changing owners and team name Marcus McIntosh finish the season with the same core of players.

The Saints were mentioned as members of Supreme Indoor Football in 2016, and again in the Can-Am Indoor Football League in 2017, but did not play any games either year.

== Roster ==
Cleveland Saints roster
Quarterbacks: 3 D. J. Barney; 16 David Thompson; Running backs: 9 Tazz Jackson; Wide receivers: 14 Jeremy Chapman; 6 Cameron Jackson; 10 Justin Mott; 2 Chris Netters; 18 Abrielle Taylor	Offensive linemen: 95 Chris Hardy; 73 Marshall Dillon; 79 Devonne McKinney; 74 Charles Pugh; Defensive linemen: 98 Marcus Allen; 13 Brian Carothers; 10 Justin Mott; 57 Tim Weeks	Linebackers: 15 Charles Pugh; Defensive backs: 21 Brian Darden; 23 Frankel Matlock; 1 Geno Trundle; 19 Dereck Vacha; Kickers: 19 Derek Metcalf	Injured reserve: currently vacant; Exempt list: currently vacant; Rookies in italics Roster updated April 7, 2015; 22 Active, 0 Inactive → More rosters

== Head coaches ==
Name	Term	Regular season				Playoffs		Awards
Name	Term	W	L	T	Win%	W	L	Awards
Marcus McIntosh	2015–present	0	8	0	.000	0	0	

== Statistics and records ==
=== Season-by-season results ===
Note: The finish, wins, losses, and ties columns list regular season results and exclude any postseason play.

League champions	Conference champions	Division champions	Wild card berth	League leader

Season	Team	League	Conference	Division	Regular season				Postseason results
Season	Team	League	Conference	Division	Finish	Wins	Losses	Ties	Postseason results
2015	2015	AIF			9th	0	8	0	
Totals						0	8	0	All-time regular season record (2015)
Totals						0	0	-	All-time postseason record (2015)
Totals						0	8	0	All-time regular season and postseason record (2015)
