= Atlanta Sharks =

Logo

General information
- Founded: 2013
- Folded: 2015
- Headquartered: Loganville, Georgia (travel team)
- Colors: Red, black, white
- AtlantaSharks.com

Personnel
- Owner: Marcus James
- General manager: Marcus James
- Head coach: Marcus James

Team history
- Atlanta Sharks (2014–2015)

League / conference affiliations
- American Indoor Football (2014–2015)

The Atlanta Sharks were a professional indoor football team based in Loganville, Georgia. They were members of American Indoor Football (AIF) during the 2014 and 2015 seasons. The Sharks joined the AIF in 2013 as an expansion team, by then owner Betty Chaney-Robinson. The Sharks played all of their games on the road as a travel team.

== History ==
The Sharks were announced as an expansion member of American Indoor Football (AIF) on September 6, 2013. On November 19, 2013, Marcus James was officially named the team's first head coach. In the franchise's first ever game, they were defeated 87-32 by the Cape Fear Heroes.

The Sharks started the 2015 season having agreed to play their home games at Creekside Sports Center in Loganville, Georgia. However, when the Sharks were supposed to host the Saginaw Sting during Week 2 of the season, the game was postponed to Week 10.

The Sharks were listed in the 2016 schedule of the Indoor Football Alliance but were not included in the alliance's inaugural draft.

== Coaches of note ==
=== Head coaches ===
Name	Term	Regular season				Playoffs		Awards
Name	Term	W	L	T	Win%	W	L	Awards
Marcus James	2014–2015	2	5	0	.286	0	0	

=== Coaching staff ===
Atlanta Sharks staff
Front office: Owner/General Manager – Marcus James; Director of business operations – Rhetta Ellis; Director of youth programs – Karl Brooks; Director of marketing – Bob Marker; Assistant marketing director – Ava Arnnold	Head coach: Head coach/offensive coordinator – Marcus James; Offensive coaches: Offensive line – Frank Caputo; Defensive coaches: Defensive coordinator – Maurice Simpkins; Defensive line – Frank Caputo; Secondary – DeMarcus James

== Statistics and records ==
=== Season-by-season results ===
Note: The finish, wins, losses, and ties columns list regular season results and exclude any postseason play.

League champions	Conference champions	Division champions	Wild card berth	League leader

Season	Team	League	Conference	Division	Regular season				Postseason results
Season	Team	League	Conference	Division	Finish	Wins	Losses	Ties	Postseason results
2014	2014	AIF			6th	1	3	0	
2015	2015	AIF			6th	1	2	0	
Totals						2	5	0	All-time regular season record (2014-2015)
Totals						0	0	-	All-time postseason record (2014-2015)
Totals						2	5	0	All-time regular season and postseason record (2014-2015)
