= Julius Gregory =

American football player (born 1988)

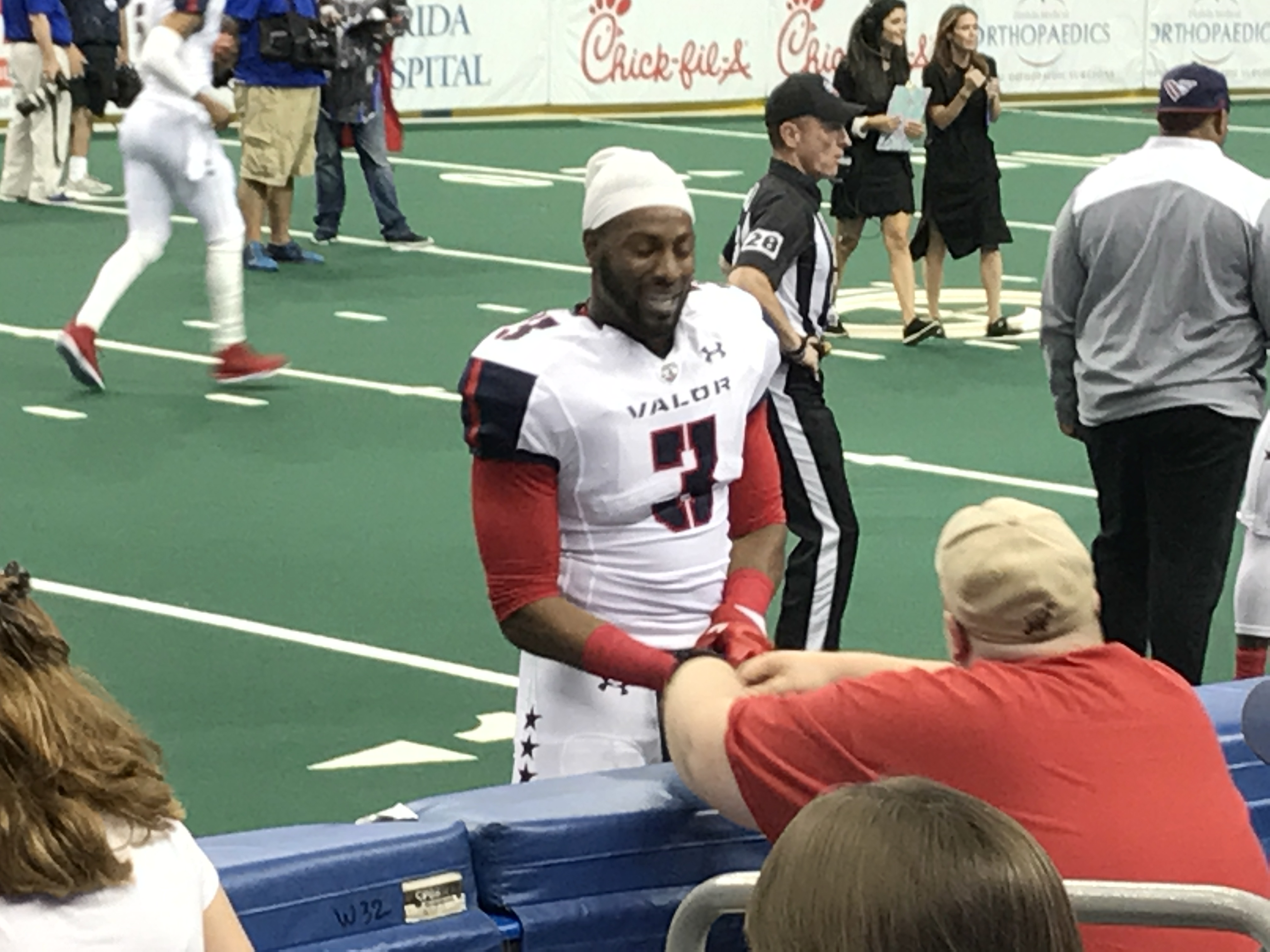
- Gregory in 2017

Profile
- Position: Wide receiver

Personal information
- Born: May 18, 1988 (age 38); Portsmouth, Virginia
- Listed height: 6 ft 4 in (1.93 m)
- Listed weight: 225 lb (102 kg)

Career information
- High school: Portsmouth (VA) I. C. Norcom
- College: Shaw
- NFL draft: 2011: undrafted

Career history
- Carolina Force (2012); York Capitals (2014); Lehigh Valley Steelhawks (2015)*; Tampa Bay Storm (2015–2016); Arizona Rattlers (2016)*; Washington Valor (2017); Albany Empire (2018)*; Columbus Destroyers (2019)*; Carolina Cobras (2019–2021); Fayetteville Mustangs (2023); Carolina Cobras (2024)
- * Offseason or practice squad member only

Awards and highlights
- Co-MVP American Indoor Football (2014)

Career AFL statistics as of 2016
- Receptions: 118
- Receiving yards: 1,297
- Receiving TDs: 31
- Tackles: 16
- Pass breakups: 1
- Stats at ArenaFan.com

Julius Gregory (born May 18, 1988) is an American football wide receiver. He played college football at Shaw University.

== College career ==
Gregory played college football at Shaw University, where he was a record setting wide receiver for the Bears. As a senior in 2010, Gregory set the single season and career records for receiving touchdowns in a season.

== Professional career ==
=== Carolina Force ===
Gregory went undrafted during the 2011 NFL draft, and signed with the Carolina Force of American Indoor Football (AIF) in 2012. Late in December 2013, Gregory worked out twice for the Denver Broncos, but did not sign with the team.

=== York Capitals ===
During the 2013 & 2014 season, Gregory played for the York Capitals, also of the AIF. Gregory was named the Co-MVP of the league in 2013 & 2014.

=== Lehigh Valley Steelhawks ===
Gregory signed with the Lehigh Valley Steelhawks of the Professional Indoor Football League (PIFL) on September 26, 2015,

=== Tampa Bay Storm ===
Gregory was later assigned to the Tampa Bay Storm of the Arena Football League (AFL) before the 2015 season began.

=== Arizona Rattlers ===
On June 22, 2016, Gregory was traded to the Arizona Rattlers for future considerations.

=== Washington Valor ===
Gregory was assigned to the Washington Valor on January 11, 2017. On April 26, 2017, Gregory was placed on recallable reassignment. On May 8, 2017, Gregory was assigned to the Valor. On June 1, 2017, Gregory was placed on reassignment.

=== Albany Empire ===
On March 21, 2018, he was assigned to the Albany Empire. On April 7, 2018, he was placed on reassignment.

=== Columbus Destroyers ===
On March 5, 2019, Gregory was assigned to the Columbus Destroyers.

=== Carolina Cobras ===
On April 13, 2019, he was placed on recallable reassignment and became a free agent. May 5, 2019 Gregory signed with the Carolina Cobras. Gregory has resigned for the 2020 & 2021 season.

=== Fayetteville Mustangs ===
On November 16, 2022, Gregory signed with the Fayetteville Mustangs of the National Arena League (NAL).

=== Carolina Cobras (second stint) ===
On November 8, 2023, Gregory signed with the Carolina Cobras of the National Arena League (NAL) for his second stint with the team.
