= Chaz Robinson (American football) =

American football player (born 1992)

Profile
- Position: Linebacker

Personal information
- Born: November 8, 1992 (age 33); Newport News, Virginia, U.S.
- Listed height: 5 ft 10 in (1.78 m)
- Listed weight: 218 lb (99 kg)

Career information
- High school: Hampton (VA) Phoebus
- College: St. Augustine's
- NFL draft: 2014: undrafted

Career history
- Blacktips (2014); York Capitals (2015)

Awards and highlights
- All-CIAA Rookie Team (2010); Second Team All-CIAA (2011); First Team All-CIAA (2013); CIAA Co-Defensive Player of the Year (2013); AIF champion (2015)

Chaz Miracle Allen Robinson (born November 8, 1992) is an American former professional football linebacker. He was born in Newport News, Virginia and was raised in Hampton, Virginia. In high school, Robinson decided to play high school football for Phoebus High School in Hampton. Robinson continued his football career playing college football for St. Augustine's University. During his senior season at St. Augustine's, Robinson was named the Co-Defensive Player of the Year in the Central Intercollegiate Athletic Association (CIAA). After graduating in 2014, Robinson signed with the Blacktips of the Fall Experimental Football League (FXFL) to compete in a “Invite-Only” NFL Development and Recruiting game amongst FXFL teams for over 15+ different NFL team scouts. Following that fall 15 season, Robinson signed with the York Capitals for 2 seasons in 2015-2016 where he also amassed a Pro Indoor Football championship in 2015 in the American Indoor Football League also known as the AIFL. In August 2018, he then went on to teach American style football to youth and mature Chinese sports enthusiasts for the Skyway Youth American Football Academy where he coached and played simultaneously for a professional team in Foshan, China called the Foshan Tigers in the CNFL (China National Football League).

== Early life ==
Robinson was born to Nina Robinson on November 8, 1992. Robinson's mother was diagnosed with uterine fibroid tumors while she was pregnant with Chaz. Fortunately, Robinson was born with no side effects of the drugs doctors prescribed to his mother during the pregnancy. Robinson would grow up healthy, and attended Phoebus High School in Hampton, Virginia. While at Phoebus, Robinson helped lead the Phantoms to three state championships as a member of the football team.

College recruiting
Name	Hometown	School	Height	Weight	40^{‡}	Commit date
Chaz Robinson; LB	Hampton, Virginia	Phoebus High School	6 ft 0 in (1.83 m)	199 lb (90 kg)	4.7	
Chaz Robinson; LB	Recruit ratings: Scout: Rivals: ESPN:					
Overall recruit ranking: Scout: -- (LB) Rivals: -- (LB), -- (VA) ESPN: -- (LB)
Note: In many cases, Scout, Rivals, 247Sports, On3, and ESPN may conflict in their listings of height and weight.; In these cases, the average was taken. ESPN grades are on a 100-point scale.; Sources: "2010 Team Ranking". Rivals.com.

== College career ==
After initially drawing interested from several Division I football programs, Robinson was left with just a football scholarship offer from St. Augustine's University.

== Professional career ==
Pre-draft measurables
Height	Weight	Arm length	Hand span	Wingspan	40-yard dash	10-yard split	20-yard split	20-yard shuttle	Three-cone drill	Vertical jump	Broad jump	Bench press
5 ft 9 3/4 in (1.77 m)	218 lb (99 kg)	29 7/8 in (0.76 m)	8 1/2 in (0.22 m)	6 ft 1 1/4 in (1.86 m)	4.96 s	1.80 s	2.94 s	4.50 s	7.46 s	29.5 in (0.75 m)	9 ft 5 in (2.87 m)	17 reps
All values from Pro Day

In 2015, Robinson signed with the York Capitals of American Indoor Football.
