= 2015 American Indoor Football season =

- League: American Indoor Football
- Sport: Indoor football
- Duration: March 20, 2015 – May 23, 2015
- Season MVP: E. J. Nemeth (York)

Playoffs
- 1 v 4 champions: York Capitals
- 1 v 4 runners-up: ASI Panthers
- 2 v 3 champions: Chicago Blitz
- 2 v 3 runners-up: Saginaw Sting

2015 AIF Championship Game
- Champions: York Capitals
- Runners-up: Chicago Blitz

AIF seasons
- ← 2014 2016 →

The 2015 American Indoor Football season was the tenth season of American Indoor Football (AIF). The regular season began March 20, 2015, and ended on May 23, 2015. Each team played an 8-game schedule, with the exception of the Maryland Eagles, who were scheduled to play a 4-game schedule, all on the road. The top 4 teams in the league advanced to the playoffs that began on May 30, 2015.

== Pre-season ==
The 2015 offseason saw major change for the AIF, as the defending champion Baltimore Mariners and Cleveland Patriots both folded and the Rochester Raiders suspended operations. The Cape Fear Heroes left the league to join the X-League Indoor Football. The league had also announced the expansion of the Buffalo Lightning and the Carolina Silverhawks. The Silverhawks had planned on playing in 2015, but decided to plan for 2016 expansion. With only 3 teams remaining from the 2014 season, the AIF expanded on October 10 into Reading, Pennsylvania by taking in the previously independent ASI Panthers. Also joining later in the day on October 10, was the Saginaw Sting, from the Continental Indoor Football League. Just 5 days later, the Chicago Blitz, who had previous announced they would be joining the X-League, joined the AIF. Finally, on December 23, 2014, the Savannah Steam announced they were leaving the X-League to join the AIF.

== Regular season ==
2015 American Indoor Football
Team	W	L	T	PCT	PF	PA	PF (Avg.)	PA (Avg.)	STK
y-York Capitals	8	0	0	1.000	394	164	49.3	20.5	W8
x-Saginaw Sting	6	2	0	.750	402	217	57.4	31.0	W6
x-Chicago Blitz	6	2	0	.750	318	187	45.4	26.7	W2
x-ASI Panthers	5	3	0	.625	356	218	44.5	18.2	W1
Savannah Steam	5	2	0	.714	232	131	33.2	18.7	W2
Atlanta Sharks	1	2	0	.333	46	112	15.3	37.3	L2
Buffalo Lightning	1	7	0	.125	184	471	23.0	58.9	L4
Maryland Eagles	0	3	0	.000	44	120	14.7	40.0	L3
Cleveland Saints	0	8	0	.000	128	424	16.0	53.0	L8

== Playoffs ==
Semifinals
1	York	68
4	ASI	58
2	Saginaw	45
3	Chicago	63

Finals
1	York	58
3	Chicago	30

== Awards ==
=== Individual season awards ===
Award	Winner	Position	Team
Most Valuable Player	E. J. Nemeth	Quarterback	York Capitals
Offensive Most Valuable Player	E. J. Nemeth	Quarterback	York Capitals
Defensive Most Valuable Player	John Williams	Defensive back	ASI Panthers
Special Teams Player of the Year	Julie Harshbarger	Kicker	Chicago Blitz

=== 1st Team All-AIF ===
Offense
Quarterback	E. J. Nemeth, York
Running back	DeShawn Hayes, Saginaw
Wide receiver	Kelvin Irving, Savannah; Rob Jones, York; C. J. Tarver, Saginaw
Offensive lineman	Mohamed Kourouma, ASI; Jason Townsend, York; Devin Smith, Saginaw

Defense
Defensive line	Edison Vushaj, Saginaw; Jonas Celian, ASI; DeAndre Mosely, Chicago
Linebacker	Michael Woodhouse, York; Herschel Thornton, ASI
Defensive back	John Williams, ASI; Armar Watson, York; Chis Mohamed, Chicago

Special teams
Kicker	Julie Harshbarger, Chicago

=== 2nd Team All-AIF ===
Offense
Quarterback	A. J. McKenna, Saginaw
Running back	Sarron Anderson, York
Wide receiver	Rob Wright, York; Daryl Shine, ASI; Brian Miles, Chicago
Offensive lineman	Victor Sesay, York; Oscar Gonzalez, ASI; Zion Pyatt, ASI

Defense
Defensive end	Tyrone Saunders, Chicago; Abe Koroma, ASI; Tim Hume, ASI
Linebacker	Jermaine Thaxton, York; Bryant Lewis, York
Defensive back	James Pitts, York; Travis Proctor, York; Mathis Quillan, Saginaw

Special teams
Kicker	Jimmy Allen, Buffalo
