= Westchester County Center =

Arena in New York, United States

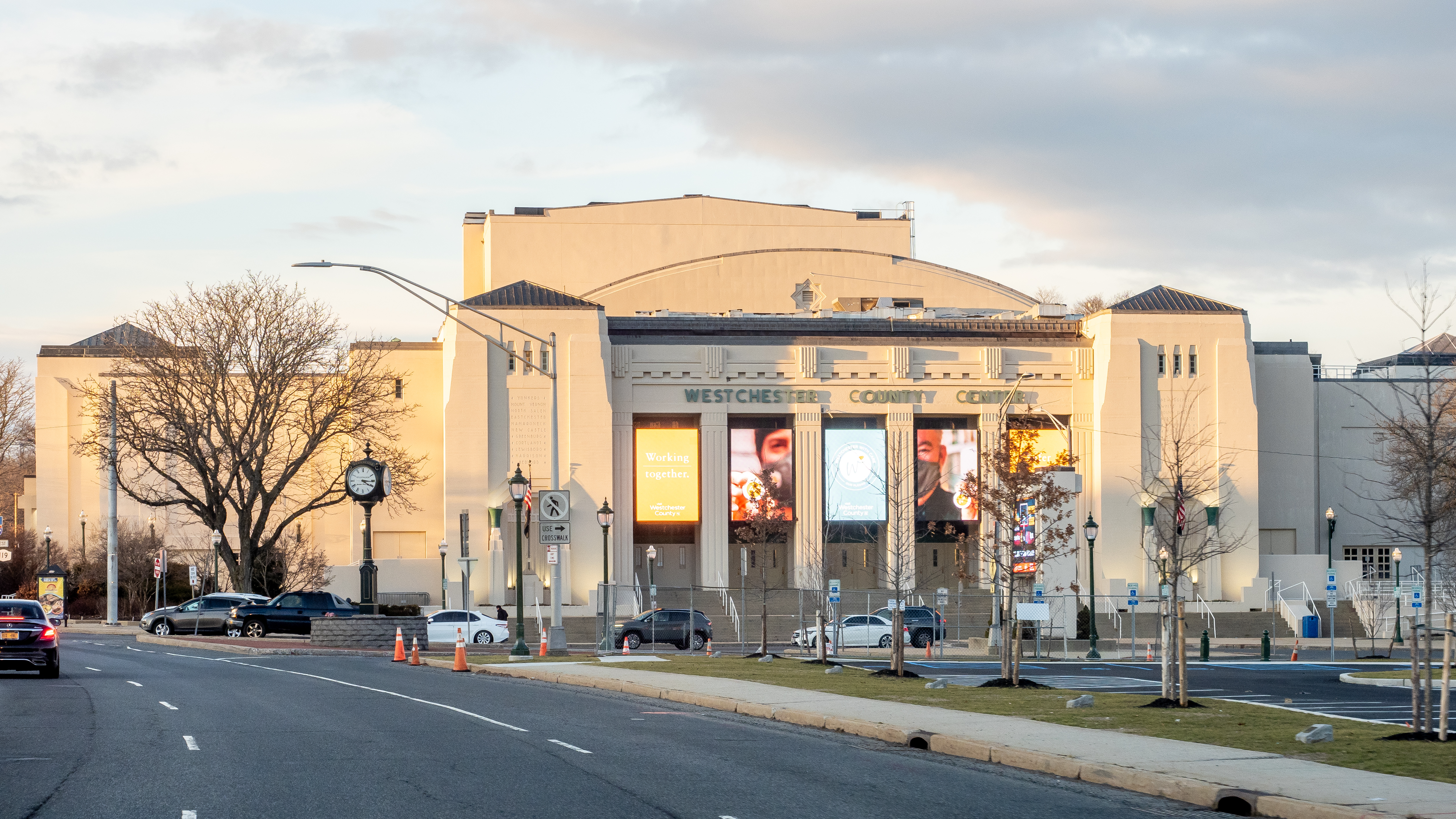
- Facade of the Westchester County Center

- Location within New York State Location within the United States
- Address: 198 Central Avenue
- Location: White Plains, New York 10606
- Coordinates: 41°2′13″N 73°46′43″W
- Capacity: Basketball: 5,000; Concerts: 5,000; Indoor football: 3,000

Construction
- Built: 1924
- Opened: 1930
- Renovated: 1988

Tenants
- New York Guard (AABA) (1978); Westchester Golden Apples (USBL) (1985); New York Liberties (MLV) (1987–1989); Westchester Kings (USBL) (1997); Westchester Knicks (NBAGL) (2014–2020, 2023–present); New York Liberty (WNBA) (2018–2019); New York Streets (NAL) (2019)

Website
- www.countycenter.biz

The Westchester County Center is a 5,000-seat multi-purpose arena in White Plains, New York. It hosts various local concerts and sporting events for the area.

The County Center was conceived by the Westchester Recreation Commission in 1924 as a multi-purpose indoor recreational facility to host community programs and income-producing commercial events. It was designed by the architectural firm of Walker & Gillette, and built and decorated in the Art Deco style. The construction project cost approximately $785,000; a $16-million rehabilitation was completed in 1988.

== Notable events ==
- Grand opening was held May 22, 1930 features pianist Percy Grainger, Metropolitan Opera Company tenor Edward Johnson, organist Palmer Christian
- First Westchester Music Festival is held in July, 1930 in the newly opened center
- Governor Herbert H. Lehman winds up his campaign with an address at a rally of the American Labor party in 1936
- Joe Baksi, future heavyweight contender, beat future movie actor Jack Palance (who fought under the name of Jack Brazzo) on December 17, 1940.
- The boxrec database lists nearly 500 cards held at Westchester over the years dating back to 1934, with televised Tuesday night bouts a staple in the early 1950s.
- At the start of his first world tour, Bob Dylan performed in concert on February 5, 1966.
- The Who played a show including their rock opera Tommy on November 3, 1969.
- The New York Guard, a team in the short-lived All-American Basketball Alliance, played here in 1978.
- The Westchester Golden Apples, a charter franchise of the minor league, summertime United States Basketball League, played at the County Center in 1985. A second USBL team, the Westchester Kings, played at the Center in 1997.
- The New York Liberties volleyball team used the center as their home venue in 1988.
- Since the fall of 2014, it has been the home of the Westchester Knicks, the New York Knicks' farm team in the NBA G League. However, due to its use to treat patients during the COVID-19 Pandemic since 2020, the Knicks temporarily relocated to Total Mortgage Arena in Bridgeport, Connecticut for home games in 2021 before returning to White Plains in 2023.
- In 2018, it became the primary home of the New York Liberty of the Women's National Basketball Association. The Liberty were purchased in 2019 by the owner of the Brooklyn Nets and moved to the Barclays Center in Brooklyn in 2020.
- In 2019, the arena was the home venue for the expansion New York Streets of the National Arena League. As the arena was too small to fit a regulation indoor football field of 50 yards plus end zones, the team played on a field that was marked as 50-yard field but was actually about 38 yards. The Streets folded after one season.
- During March 2020, it was announced that the Westchester County Center would be used to hold COVID-19 patients during the COVID-19 pandemic.
- Impact Wrestling held the 2023 edition of Victory Road and the tapings of the 1000th episode of its flagship weekly television program Impact! at the center in September 2023.
