= Macey Brooks =

American football player, coach, and executive (born 1975)

No. 83
- Position: Wide receiver

Personal information
- Born: March 2, 1975 (age 51); Hampton, Virginia, U.S.
- Listed height: 6 ft 5 in (1.96 m)
- Listed weight: 212 lb (96 kg)

Career information
- High school: Kecoughtan (Hampton)
- College: James Madison
- NFL draft: 1997: 4th round, 127th overall pick

Career history

Playing
- Dallas Cowboys (1997); Chicago Bears (1998–2000); Oakland Raiders (2002)*
- * Offseason or practice squad member only

Coaching
- Aurora University (IL) Wide Receivers Coach (2011-2112); Kane County Dawgs Wide Receivers Coach (2013)

Operations
- Kane County Dawgs – Co-owner (2013)

Awards and highlights
- All-Yankee Conference (1996)

Career NFL statistics
- Receptions: 40
- Receiving yards: 376
- Rushing yards: 7
- Stats at Pro Football Reference

Barry Macey Brooks (born March 2, 1975) is an American former professional football player who was a wide receiver in the National Football League (NFL) for the Dallas Cowboys and Chicago Bears. He was also a co-owner and wide receivers coach for the Kane County Dawgs of the Continental Indoor Football League (CIFL). He played college football for the James Madison Dukes.

== Early life ==
Brooks attended Kecoughtan High School, where he was a four-sport letterman (football, baseball, basketball and track). As a senior, he tallied 27 receptions for 620 yards and 8 touchdowns, while receiving All-area, All-Peninsula district, All-Eastern region and honorable-mention All-state honors at wide receiver. He was the runner up to Allen Iverson for the Daily Press Peninsula Athlete of the year award.

He was an All-district selection in baseball, helping his team reach the state finals. He also helped the basketball team win the regional title.

== College career ==
Brooks accepted a football scholarship from James Madison University. As a true freshman, he appeared in 10 games, tallying 4 receptions for 92 yards.

As a sophomore, he became a starter at wide receiver, posting 26 receptions (second on the team), 552 receiving yards (led the team), 21.2 yards per reception (second in school history) and 5 touchdowns (led the team). He had 135 receiving yards against Middle Tennessee State University.

As a junior, he registered 32 receptions (third on the team), 542 yards and 6 touchdowns (second on the team). He had 4 receptions for 87 yards and 2 touchdowns, including the winning score with 37 seconds left, in a 38-31 win against Boston University.

As a senior, he posted 56 receptions (second on the team) and 828 receiving yards (third in school history), while breaking the school record for most touchdowns in a single-season with 14. He collected 8 receptions and 3 receiving touchdowns (tied the school record) against McNeese State University. He also had 3 receiving touchdowns against Boston University. He tallied 5 catches for 121 yards and one touchdown against New Hampshire University. He made 7 receptions for 127 yards and 2 touchdowns over Villanova University. He finished his college career with 118 receptions (fourth in school history), 2,014 yards (third in school history) and 25 touchdowns (school record).

In baseball, he played right field for three seasons, starting 119 out of 145 games. As a freshman, he hit for a .307 average, 7 doubles, 4 triples, 4 home runs and 21 RBIs.

As a sophomore, he hit for a .266 average, 10 doubles, one triple, 5 home runs and 27 RBIs, while being a part of the team that won the CAA regular season title and advanced to the NCAA South regional.

As a junior, he started 51-of-55 contests, hitting for a .298 average, 13 doubles, 3 triples, 5 home runs and 34 RBIs. He was selected twice by Major League Baseball, in the second round of the 1993 MLB Amateur Draft by the San Francisco Giants and in the 55th round of the 1996 Amateur Draft by the Kansas City Royals.

== Professional career ==
=== Dallas Cowboys ===
Brooks was selected by the Dallas Cowboys in the fourth round (127th overall) of the 1997 NFL draft. He was impressing during training camp until breaking his right forearm three places during the fourth quarter of a 34-31 win over the St. Louis Rams. He was placed on the injured reserve list on August 27.

In 1998, he was a candidate for the second receiver role opposite Michael Irvin but had problems with consistency and was waived on August 31 to make room for wide receiver Patrick Jeffers.

=== Chicago Bears ===
On September 1, 1998, he was signed by the Chicago Bears to their practice squad. On October 7, he was promoted to the active roster. In 1999, he registered 14 passes for 160 yards in the first 9 games (2 starts), before suffering a knee injury and being placed on the injured reserve list on November 9. He wasn't re-signed after the season.

=== Oakland Raiders ===
On April 21, 2002, he was signed as a free agent by the Oakland Raiders after being out of football for a year. He was released on June 15.

== Coaching career ==
In 2012, Brooks joined the ownership group of the Kane County Dawgs, an expansion franchise of the Continental Indoor Football League. He also served as the team's wide receivers coach, as well as strength and conditioning coordinator. The team would only play one game in its history, as the following week the league announced on their website that the franchise was "indefinitely suspending operations" to protect the integrity of the league.
