= Buffalo RiverWorks =

Multipurpose indoor venue and restaurant in Buffalo, New York

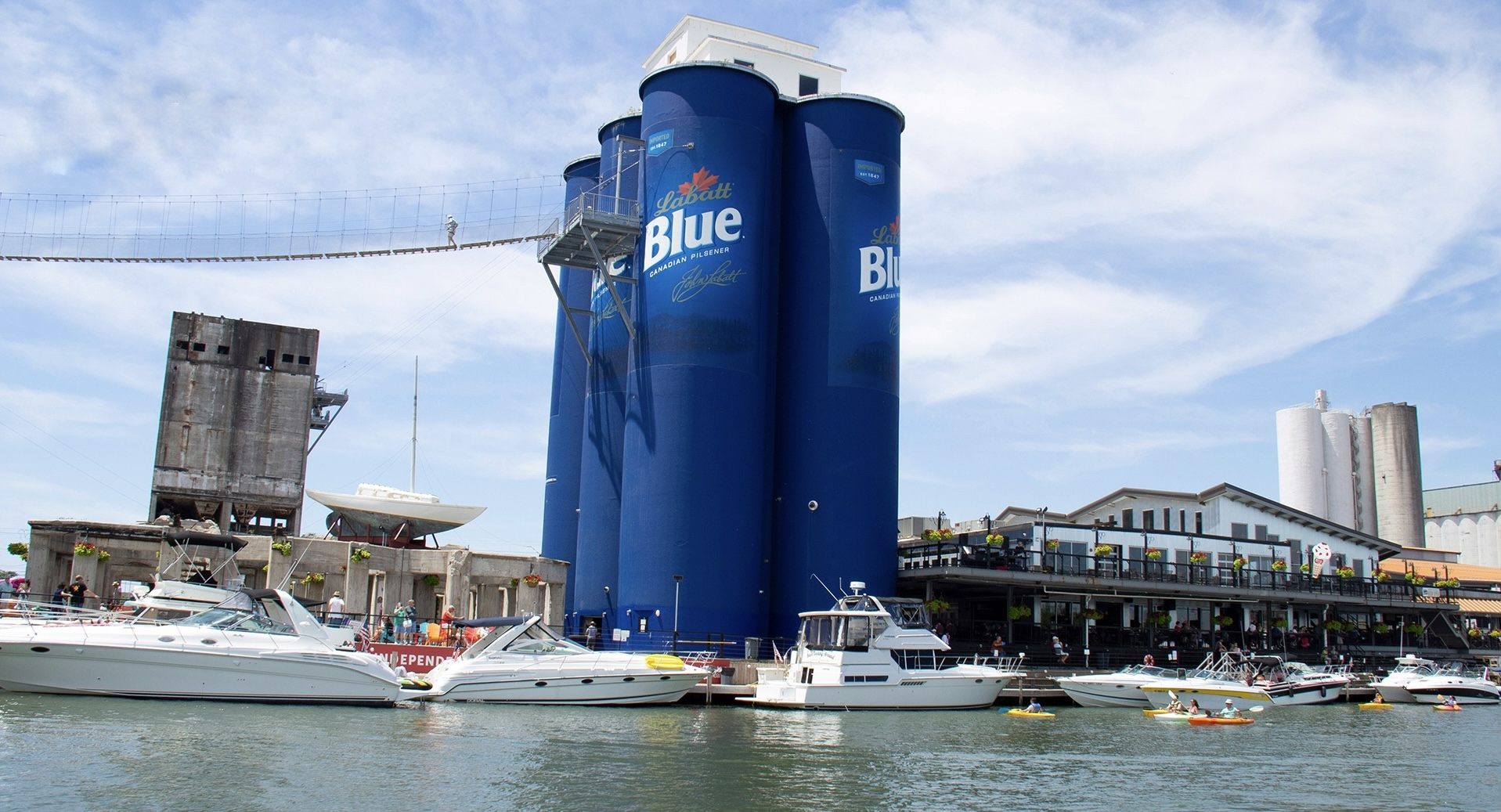
- Exterior from across the Buffalo River
- Interactive map of Buffalo RiverWorks
- Address: 359 Ganson Street
- Location: Buffalo, New York 14203
- Coordinates: 42°52′12.4″N 78°52′19.5″W
- Owner: Earl Ketry
- Capacity: 6,000
- Type: Multi-purpose arena
- Event: Sporting events

Construction
- Opened: 2014
- Cost: $18 million ($24.5 million in 2025 dollars)
- Architect: Abstract Architecture

Tenants
- Queen City Roller Derby 2016–present Buffalo Blitz (Can-Am) 2017

Website
- https://buffaloriverworks.com/

Buffalo RiverWorks is a multipurpose indoor venue and restaurant located on the shore of the Buffalo River in Buffalo, New York.

== History ==
The property incorporates the original Wheeler grain elevator that was built in 1909.

== Notable events ==
Featuring two open-air hockey rinks, the venue has hosted the Labatt Blue Pond Hockey Tournament since 2014 and the Queen City Roller Derby since 2016.

In 2017, the venue was home to the Buffalo Blitz of the Can-Am Indoor Football League.

The annual music festival and professional wrestling event TID The Season, promoted by Every Time I Die, has taken place at the venue from 2017 to 2021. The 2021 event included the final performances by Every Time I Die before their breakup.

Many other professional wrestling events have taken place at the venue, including Global Wars 2017, Global Wars 2018, ROH/NJPW War of the Worlds 2019, and several NXT house shows.

The Buffalo Beauts of the Premier Hockey Federation hosted the annual Buffalo Believes Classic at the venue from 2019 to 2022.

Better Lovers has promoted the annual music festival and professional wrestling event Blissmas at the venue since 2024.

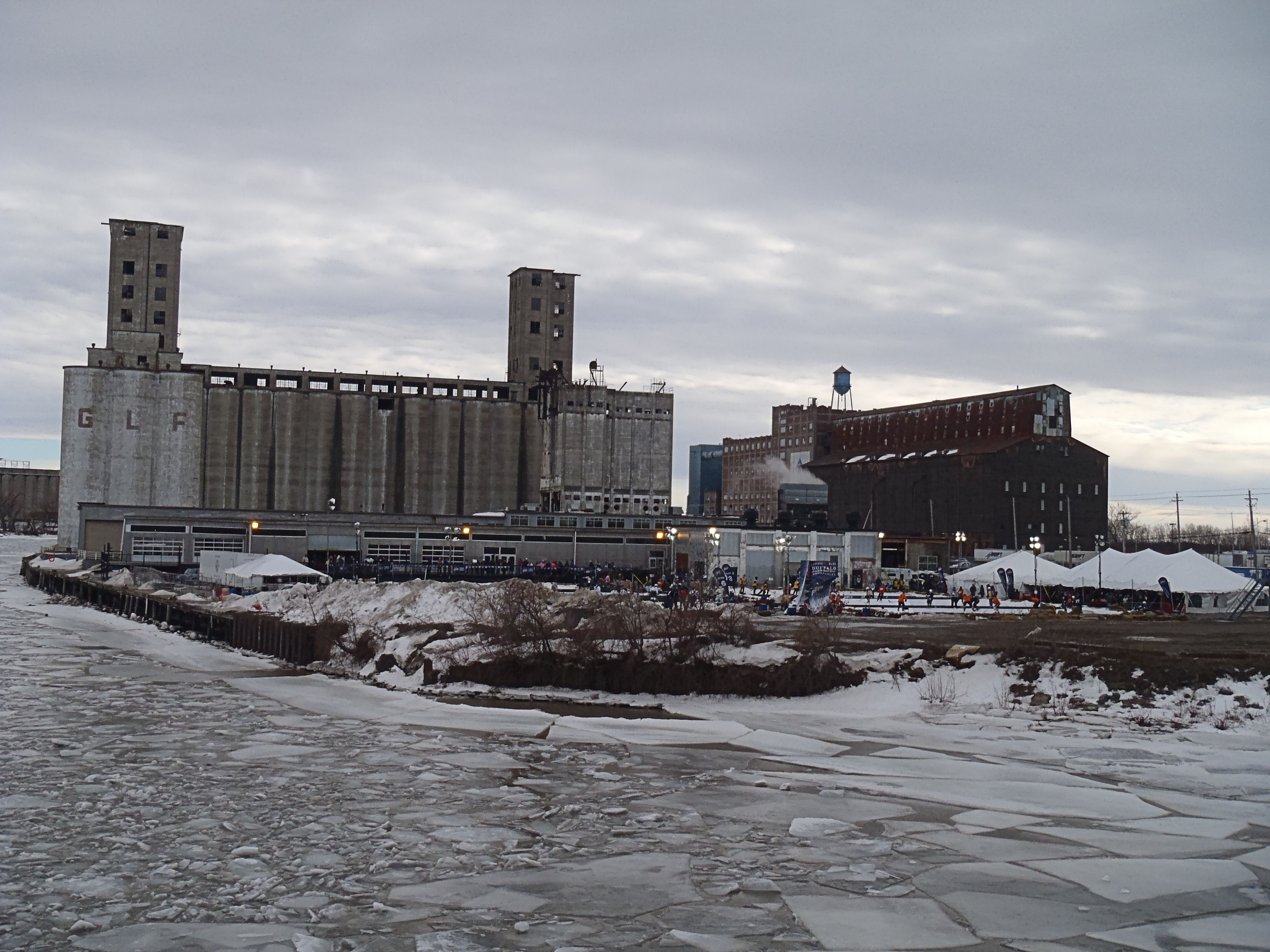
2014 Labatt Blue Pond Hockey Tournament
