= 2014 American Indoor Football season =

- League: American Indoor Football
- Sport: Indoor football
- Season MVP: Richard Johnson (BAL); Julius Gregory (YORK)

Playoffs
- #1 Seed champions: Cape Fear Heroes
- #1 Seed runners-up: Bye
- Playoff champions: Baltimore Mariners
- Playoff runners-up: Rochester Raiders

2014 AIF Championship Game
- Champions: Baltimore Mariners
- Runners-up: Cape Fear Heroes

AIF seasons
- ← 2013 2015 →

The 2014 American Indoor Football season was the ninth season of American Indoor Football (AIF). The Baltimore Mariners defeated the Cape Fear Heroes 45–44 to claim their second ever AIF title.

== Standings ==
Team	Wins	Losses	Percentage
Cape Fear Heroes	5	1	.833
Baltimore Mariners	4	1	.800
Rochester Raiders	4	3	.571
Cleveland Patriots	2	2	.500
York Capitals	1	5	.167
Washington Eagles	0	1	.000
Atlanta Sharks	0	3	.000

- Green indicates clinched playoff berth
- Gray indicates best regular season record

== Playoffs ==
Semifinal			Final
			1	Cape Fear	44
2	Baltimore	46	2	Baltimore	45
3	Rochester	40

== Awards ==
=== Individual season awards ===
Award	Winner	Position	Team
Co-Most Valuable Player	Julius Gregory	Wide receiver	York Capitals
Co-Most Valuable Player	Richard Johnson	Defensive back	Baltimore Mariners
Coach of the Year	Ron Meeham	Head coach	Baltimore Mariners
General Manager of the Year	Scott Garrity	General Manager	Baltimore Mariners

=== 1st Team All-AIF ===
Offense
Quarterback	Steve Adams, Cape Fear
Running back	Matt Winger, Baltimore
Wide receiver	Julius Gregory, York; Kevin Concepcion, Rochester; Abe Taylor, Cleveland
Offensive lineman	Scott Burley, Baltimore; Allen Joyner, Rochester; Joshua Pugh, Cape Fear

Defense
Defensive line	Quane Madison, Baltimore; Chad Nkang, Baltimore; Cory Groover, Cape Fear
Linebacker	Chindy Agugua, York; Darius Leak, Baltimore
Defensive back	Richard Johnson, Baltimore; Richard Kimbrew, Rochester; Josh Peacock, Cleveland

Special teams
Kicker	J. R. Cipra, Baltimore
