= Kane County Dawgs =

Logo

General information
- Founded: 2012
- Folded: 2013
- Headquartered: Seven Bridges Ice Arena in Woodridge, Illinois
- Colors: Fire Brick, Goldenrod, white

Personnel
- Owners: Mike Dortch; Macey Brooks
- General manager: Mike Dortch
- Head coach: Matt Griebel

Team history
- Kane County Dawgs (2012)

Home fields
- Seven Bridges Ice Arena (2012)

League / conference affiliations
- Continental Indoor Football League (2012)

The Kane County Dawgs were a professional indoor American football team based in Kane County, Illinois. The team joined the Continental Indoor Football League in 2013 as an expansion team. The Dawgs were one of three indoor football teams based in the Chicago metropolitan area. The Chicago Rush of the Arena Football League are based in Rosemont, and the Chicago Slaughter of the Indoor Football League are based in Hoffman Estates. The CIFL has had the Chicago Pythons (in 2012) which replaced the Chicago Knights (in 2011), formerly the Chicago Cardinals (in 2010), as the Illinois-based CIFL team, which replaced the Slaughter after they left for the Indoor Football League after a dispute with CIFL management. The Owners of the Dawgs are Mike Dortch and Macey Brooks. The Dawgs played their home games at the Seven Bridges Ice Arena in 2013.

== Franchise history ==
=== 2013 ===
The franchise was originally to be called the DeKalb Dawgs, and were to play in the American Professional Football League in 2013, before announcing that they would be joining the Continental Indoor Football League as its tenth member in October 2012. On October 10, 2012, the franchise announced that former National Football League and Arena Football League player Matt Griebel was named the team's first head coach. The team also announced that they would be playing their home games at the Canlan Ice Sports Arena in Romeoville, Illinois. In November 2012, former NFL wide receiver, Macey Brooks joined the Dawgs with an ownership interest in the team, and will also serve as the team's wide receivers coach.

After having the first two weeks of the season off with bye weeks, the Dawgs forfeited their first game, when the turf they purchased did not adequately fit the Seven Bridges Ice Arena. The following week, the Dawgs would lose their first ever played game in franchise history, with a 13-69 loss to the Erie Explosion.

The loss to the Explosion, would end up being the team's only game, as the following week the league announced on their website that the Dawgs franchise was "indefinitely suspending operations" to protect the integrity of the league. Players and coaches were all released and free to sign with other teams in the CIFL or elsewhere.

== Final roster ==
Kane County Dawgs roster
Quarterbacks: 7 Rodney Brown; 11 Mosely Haven; 5 Demetrius Jones; Running backs: 33 Greg Owens; Wide receivers: 12 Michael Leaks; 3 Nathan Lohmann; 4 Tom McGinnis; 2 Brian Miles; 10 Adrian Perez	Offensive linemen: 53 A. J. Adams; 64 Daniel Broom; 71 Anthony Bullock; 55 Prenny Stokes; Defensive linemen: 47 Eugene Beard; 16 Fred Blue; 50 Christian Daigre; 85 D. J. Grayson; Linebackers: 23 Tim Jarvis	Defensive backs: 22 Maxwell Frempong; 1 Bryon Jackson; 14 Antwain Jones; 44 Bobby Miller; 8 Mike Thornton; 6 Sinque Turner; Kickers: 99 Julie Harshbarger	Injured Reserve: currently vacant; Exempt List: currently vacant; Practice squad: currently vacant; rookies in italics; Roster updated February 23, 2013; 25 Active, 0 Inactive, 0 PS

== Coaches of note ==
=== Head coaches ===
Note: Statistics are correct through Week 3 of the 2013 Continental Indoor Football League season.

Name	Term	Regular season				Playoffs		Awards
Name	Term	W	L	T	Win%	W	L	Awards
Matt Griebel	2013	0	1	0	.000	0	0	

=== Coaching staff ===
Kane County Dawgs staff
Front office: Director of football operations – Vernard Alsberry; Director of front office operations – Bri Dortch; Director of game day operations – Zach Tolliver	Head coach: Head coach – Matt Griebel; Offensive coaches: Offensive coordinator – Nick Lago; Wide receivers – Macey Brooks; Defensive coaches: Defensive coordinator – Rob Williams; Defensive line – Anthony Purvis; Special teams: Special Teams Asst. Coach – Chris Lago

== Season-by-season results ==
League champions	Conference champions	Division champions	Wild card berth	League leader

Season	Team	League	Conference	Division	Regular season				Postseason results
Season	Team	League	Conference	Division	Finish	Wins	Losses	Ties	Postseason results
2013	2013	CIFL				0	10	0	
Totals						0	10	0	All-time regular season record (2013)
Totals						0	0	-	All-time postseason record (2013)
Totals						0	10	0	All-time regular season and postseason record (2013)
