= Juice Williams =

American football player (born 1987)

- Williams at the 2007 Fighting Illini Fan Appreciation Day

No. 7
- Position: Quarterback

Personal information
- Born: November 19, 1987 (age 38); Chicago, Illinois, U.S.
- Listed height: 6 ft 1 in (1.85 m)
- Listed weight: 226 lb (103 kg)

Career information
- High school: Chicago Vocational
- College: Illinois
- NFL draft: 2010: undrafted

Career history
- Chicago Slaughter (2011–2013); Chicago Blitz (2014); Central Penn Capitals (2016)

Awards and highlights
- First-team All-CIFL (2014); Second-team All-Big Ten (2008)

Isiah John "Juice" Williams (born November 19, 1987) is an American former football quarterback. He played college football at Illinois. After his senior year of high school in 2005, Williams was considered a top recruit for the quarterback position.

== Early life ==
Isiah John Williams is the son of Stanley and Anita Williams. Mrs. Williams nearly died at birth due to his large size of 13 pounds and 8 ounces. He has two brothers and one sister. He was born the youngest of four siblings.

Williams was dubbed "Juice" by his grandmother because of his large size as a child. "I was kind of big … you know, big and juicy, I guess."

He was a high school honor student and attended the same school as former Illinois star Dick Butkus: Chicago Vocational High School. Williams is active both in his church and local community.

== Recruiting ==
College recruiting
Name	Hometown	School	Height	Weight	40^{‡}	Commit date
Isiah Williams; QB	Chicago Illinois	Chicago Vocational High School	6 ft 2 in (1.88 m)	207 lb (94 kg)	4.77	May 28, 2005
Isiah Williams; QB	Recruit ratings: Scout: Rivals: (82)					
Overall recruit ranking: Scout: 5 (QB) Rivals: 3 (QB), 2 (IL), 80 National ESPN: 8 (QB), 11 (East Region)
‡ Refers to 40-yard dash; Note: In many cases, Scout, Rivals, 247Sports, On3, and ESPN may conflict in their listings of height, weight and 40 time.; In these cases, the average was taken. ESPN grades are on a 100-point scale.; Sources: "2006 Illinois Football Commitment List (20)". Rivals.; "Illinois College Football Recruiting Commits". Scout.; "ESPN". ESPN.; "Scout.com Team Recruiting Rankings". Scout.; "2006 Team Ranking". Rivals.com.

== College career ==
=== 2006: Freshman year ===
Williams played in the first four games of the 2006 football season, splitting time with senior quarterback Tim Brasic. He threw his first collegiate touchdown pass (a 76-yarder to Rashard Mendenhall) in the third game of the year against Syracuse. In the 4th game of the season, Williams made his first collegiate start in a losing effort vs Iowa.

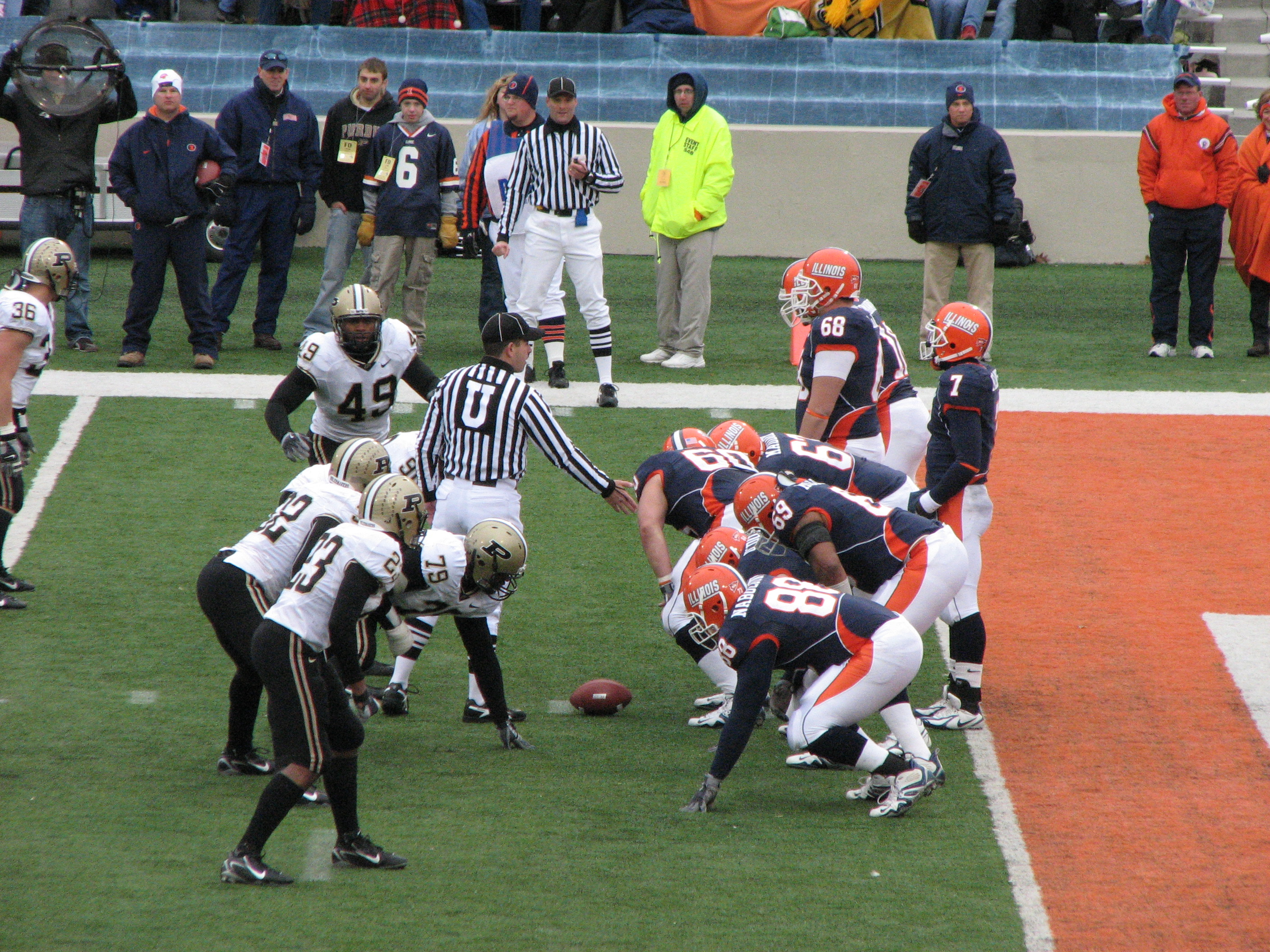
Juice lining up against Purdue on November 11, 2006

On September 30, 2006, Williams led the Illini on a game-winning 4th-quarter drive for a 39-yard field goal that gave the team a 23–20 upset victory over host Michigan State. Illinois came into the game as 26-point underdogs. It was the team's first conference victory since the 2004 season. Williams finished with 122 yards passing, one touchdown pass, and 103 yards rushing. Illinois could not keep the momentum from the Michigan State game, losing the remainder of their games (several by less than a touchdown and two on last second field goals). Williams displayed inconsistency in his game finishing the season with a completion percentage below 40 and passing for fewer than 100 yards in the season's final three games.

=== 2007: Sophomore year ===
Williams was injured in the second quarter of the season opening loss to Mizzou and kept out of the second half for precautionary reasons. Williams showed improvement in his accuracy in the 3+ drives he was in, throwing 9 balls, 6 of which were caught for 59 yards. Williams had mediocre games in the Illini's first 3 victories over Western Illinois, Syracuse, and Indiana. Williams had average numbers in Illinois' back-to-back victories against ranked teams, defeating Penn State and Wisconsin.

It seemed as if Illinois' promising 5–1 start may have been a fluke, as they proceeded to drop their next two games, a 10–6 loss at Iowa and a 27–17 defeat against Michigan in Champaign. Williams threw for a combined 168 yards and 1 touchdown and 1 interception in the two losses. The Illini, however, turned it around in their next two games in victories over Ball St and Minnesota. Williams had perhaps his best game to that point vs Minnesota totaling over 300 yards on offense (203 passing, 133 rushing) and scoring 3 touchdowns (2 passing and 1 rushing).

Yet, the best was yet to come as Williams had what some consider his greatest game at Ohio Stadium versus the top ranked Buckeyes. Williams led Illinois to a 28–21 upset over Ohio State, its first win over a #1 ranked team since 1956. During this game he threw for 4 touchdowns and completed 12 passes of 22 attempts. He threw a total of 140 yards and rushed for 70 yards. Williams amassed over 350 yards of offense en route to a 41–22 victory over in state rival Northwestern in the regular season finale. Williams totaled over 2,200 yards of offense and scored 20 touchdowns, as he led the Illini to a 9–3 record and their first bowl berth since the 2002 Sugar Bowl. Illinois was selected to play against perennial power USC in the Rose Bowl, the Illini's first time playing in the Rose Bowl since 1984. Illinois would lose the game 49–17, with USC scoring 28 points off of 4 Illinois turnovers (2 interceptions and 2 fumbles on runs after completions. Williams threw for his highest passing yard total to date (245), but had no touchdown passes and 2 interceptions.

=== 2008: Junior year ===
Illinois entered the 2008 season ranked as the #20 team in the nation, despite the loss of Big Ten MVP Rashard Mendenhall. Williams and the Illini opened the season vs. Missouri, and despite one of the best passing games in Illinois history where Williams threw for 451 yards and 5 touchdowns, the Illini lost to 6th ranked Missouri 52–42. The Illini would pick up their first win of the season vs Eastern Illinois, where Williams amassed 174 yards rushing with 2 touchdowns in the 47–21 victory. Williams and the Illini struggled in a 20–17 victory over Louisiana-Lafayette, in which Williams amassed just over 180 yards of total offense. After a bye week (the first at Illinois under Ron Zook), the Illini traveled to Penn State and fell 38–24, with Juice passing for 183 yards and rushing for another 64. Illinois next traveled to Michigan and Juice amassed 431 yards of total offense (310 passing, 121 rushing, 4 total touchdowns), which is both the most total yards in Michigan Stadium history and the most given up by any Michigan team, as the Illini won 45–20. The Illini fell flat vs Minnesota the following week, losing 27–20 despite Williams throwing for a career-high of 462 yards along with 2 touchdowns. Williams had a solid game vs Indiana, passing for 271 yards and 4 total touchdowns.

=== 2009: Senior year ===
Illinois entered the 2009 season unranked. On August 3, 2009, Williams was named to the 2009 Davey O'Brien National Quarterback Award Watch List. Then On August 27, 2009, Williams was named to the 22-man watch list for the 2009 Johnny Unitas Golden Arm award, given to the nation's top senior signal-caller.

Williams was pulled out of a game against Ohio State for throwing 2 key interceptions. Coach Zook announced on October 5 that Juice will be benched in favor of Eddie McGee.

Williams and his Fighting Illini finished a losing 2009–2010 season on December 5, 2009, to Fresno State. During that game Juice Williams surpassed former Illini Jack Trudeau to become second in team history with 56 career touchdown passes.

== Career stats ==
Statistics up to date as of October 11, 2008. High School stats from Rivals.com. College Stats from ESPN.

=== Passing ===
Year	Team	Comps	Attempts	Yards	Average	Long	TDs	INTs
2005	Chicago Vocational Career Academy	72	128	1,841	25.5	–	22	3
High school totals		72	128	1,841	25.5	–	22	3
2006	Illinois	103	261	1,489	5.7	76	9	9
2007	Illinois	153	267	1,743	6.5	56	13	12
2008	Illinois	219	381	3,173	8.3	77	22	16
2009	Illinois	131	227	1,632	7.2	58	12	7
College totals		606	1,136	8,037	7.1	77	56	44

=== Rushing ===
Year	Team	Attempts	Yards	Average	Long	TDs
2005	Chicago Vocational Career Academy	166	1,441	21.8	–	17
High school totals		166	1,441	21.8	–	17
2006	Illinois	154	576	3.7	45	2
2007	Illinois	165	755	4.6	24	7
2008	Illinois	175	719	4.1	50	5
2009	Illinois	143	507	3.5	49	4
College totals		637	2,557	4.0	50	18

== Professional career ==
Pre-draft measurables
Height	Weight	40-yard dash	10-yard split	20-yard split	20-yard shuttle	Three-cone drill	Vertical jump	Broad jump
6 ft 1 3/8 in (1.86 m)	226 lb (103 kg)	4.91 s	1.63 s	2.82 s	4.33 s	6.80 s	33.5 in (0.85 m)	9 ft 4 in (2.84 m)
All values from Pro Day

=== Chicago Bears ===
Williams went undrafted in the 2010 NFL draft. The Chicago Bears invited Williams to attend a rookie mini-camp tryout. The Bears already had Jay Cutler, Caleb Hanie, and rookie Dan LeFevour on the roster. During the offseason, Chicago also picked up Todd Collins and Matt Gutierrez. Williams did not receive any other invitations from professional teams.

On October 4, 2010, after a game against the New York Giants in which both starting QB Cutler and 2nd-stringer Todd Collins were knocked out of the game, Williams tweeted that the Bears had contacted him and that he was "high on [their] list." However, he was never added to the roster.

=== Chicago Slaughter ===
From 2013 through 2014 Williams was a regular player for the Chicago Slaughter indoor football team.

=== Chicago Blitz ===
When the Slaughter decided to sit out the 2014 season, Williams signed with the Chicago Blitz of the Continental Indoor Football League.

=== Central Penn Capitals ===
In February 2016, Williams signed with the Central Penn Capitals of American Indoor Football (AIF).

== Personal life ==
In March 2014, Williams accepted a position as the University of Illinois' director of alumni and former player relations. In April 2015, Williams left Illinois to join the Georgetown athletic development staff to join his wife who accepted a job in Georgetown's law department. In 2017, Williams left Georgetown to become a financial advisor at Merrill Lynch's Washington, DC office, followed by a stint as a financial advisor at Northwestern Mutual. He is now CEO & Partner of Audible Wealth Management, a financial advisory firm in Maryland.
