= Ed Williams (wide receiver) =

American gridiron football player (born 1991)

Profile
- Position: Wide receiver

Personal information
- Born: March 14, 1991 (age 35); Tampa, Florida, U.S.
- Listed height: 6 ft 0 in (1.83 m)
- Listed weight: 196 lb (89 kg)

Career information
- High school: Braulio Alonso (Tampa)
- College: Fort Hays State
- NFL draft: 2015: undrafted

Career history
- Green Bay Packers (2015–2016)*; Hamilton Tiger-Cats (2017)*
- * Offseason or practice squad member only
- Stats at CFL.ca

Ed Lee Williams (born March 14, 1991) is an American former football wide receiver. He played college football at Fort Hays State. Williams was signed by the Green Bay Packers as an undrafted free agent in 2015.

== Professional career ==
After going undrafted in the 2015 NFL draft, Williams signed with the Green Bay Packers on August 3, 2015. On September 5, 2015, he was released by the Packers during final team cuts. Williams was signed to the Packers' practice squad on September 8, 2015. On January 18, 2016, he was re-signed by the Packers after finishing the season on the practice squad. Williams was released by the Packers on August 29, 2016.
