= Julie Harshbarger =

American gridiron football player (born 1985)

No. 9, 15, 99
- Position: Placekicker

Personal information
- Born: December 9, 1985 (age 40); Roscoe, Illinois, U.S.
- Listed height: 5 ft 11 in (1.80 m)
- Listed weight: 140 lb (64 kg)

Career information
- High school: Rockton (IL) Hononegah Community
- College: Benedictine
- NFL draft: 2008: undrafted

Career history
- Chicago Cardinals (2010); Chicago Knights (2011); Chicago Vipers/Pythons (2012); Kane County Dawgs (2013); Chicago Blitz (2014–2016); Chicago Eagles (2016)

Awards and highlights
- First woman to score a point in a professional indoor football game.; CIFL Special Teams Player of the Year (2014); First Team All-CIFL (2014); AIF Special Teams Player of the Year (2015); First Team All-AIF (2015)

Julie Harshbarger (born December 9, 1985) is an American former professional football placekicker. She is most known for being the first woman to score a field goal in indoor football, as a member of the Chicago Cardinals of the Continental Indoor Football League (CIFL), and, at seven seasons and counting, having the longest documented career for a woman playing professional football in leagues dominated by men (other female football players have typically had professional careers of a year or less).

She grew up in Rockton, Illinois where she was a standout on both the soccer and football field playing for Hononegah Community High School. Her play on the soccer field attracted a scholarship offer from Rockford College. She was twice named All-Northern Illinois-Iowa Conference as a soccer player. Her junior year, she transferred to Benedictine University where she earned All-NIIA Conference twice more and lead the team in assist her senior season. Harshbarger has typically played professionally for indoor football teams based in the Chicago area.

== Early life ==
Julie attended Hononegah Community High School in Rockton, Illinois where she succeeded on both the soccer field and the football field.

== College career ==
=== Rockford College ===
Harshbarger was able to earn a scholarship to Rockford College in Rockford, Illinois, where she played both soccer and football and baseball.

==== Soccer ====
She played for the Lady Regents, an NCAA Division III institution, from 2004–2005, where she was twice named All-Northern Illinois-Iowa Conference.

==== Football ====
She was the kicker for the football team.

=== Benedictine University ===
Harshbarger transferred to Benedictine University after two years at Rockford. She played football her Junior year. For soccer, she was twice again named All-NIIC. As a senior in 2007, Harshbarger had five goals and led the Benedictine team with seven assists.

== Professional career ==
=== Chicago Cardinals ===
In 2010, Harshbarger tried her luck with the Chicago Cardinals. After showing up to multiple tryouts, Harshbarger was cut before the season started for the Cardinals. 3 weeks into the season, the team called her back and asked for her to play due to their kicking woes. This made Harshbarger the 2nd woman ever to play in the CIFL, the first being Katie Hnida of the Fort Wayne Firehawks. Hnida went on to make an extra point in the FireHawks opener, thus becoming the first female to ever score a point in the CIFL. Hashbarger would however, become the first ever female to make a field goal in an indoor football professional game, on April 24, 2010. She connected with a 24-yard field goal against the FireHawks in a 69-45 loss. For the season she was 1 for 16 on field goal attempts and 4 for 11 on PAT's.

=== Chicago Knights ===
In 2011, she joined up with the Chicago Knights, who replaced the Cardinals in the CIFL. She saw her production take a much greater incline by making 8 of 14 field goals, 19 of 26 PAT's and lead the team in points scored with 43.

=== Chicago Vipers ===
On February 23, 2012, it was announced that Harshbarger had signed with the Chicago Vipers, who replaced the Chicago Knights in the CIFL.

=== Chicago Blitz ===
In 2014, Harshbarger signed with the Chicago Blitz, also of the CIFL. Harshbarger lead the CIFL in field goals name (5), on her way to being named CIFL Special Teams Player of the Year. Harshbarger was released on April 5, 2016.

=== Chicago Eagles ===
Harshbarger signed with the Chicago Eagles on May 12, 2016.
