= New York Streets =

Professional indoor football team

Logo

General information
- Founded: 2018
- Folded: 2019
- Headquartered: White Plains, New York at the Westchester County Center
- Colors: Black, silver, white
- NYStreetsFootball.com

Personnel
- Owner: Corey Galloway
- Head coach: Rick Marsilio
- President: Devale Ellis

Team history
- New York Streets (2019)

Home fields
- Westchester County Center (2019)

League / conference affiliations
- National Arena League (2019)

The New York Streets were a professional indoor football team based in the New York metropolitan area. They were owned by Corey Galloway and were members of the National Arena League (NAL) for the 2019 season. They played their home games at the Westchester County Center in White Plains, New York.

The Streets were not included in any plans for the NAL's 2020 season.

== History ==
In July 2018, the franchise was founded by Brooklyn businessman Corey Galloway, making him the first African-American owner of a New York-area professional sports team. They announced that they were members of the National Arena League (NAL), at a press conference in NYC. The NAL announced its approval of a New York City franchise for the 2019 season, added the Streets' logo to their team list on December 17, and officially announced the team on December 18.

The team announced they would play most of their home games at Westchester County Center in White Plains, New York, with select games at Madison Square Garden. When they released their inaugural schedule, no games at Madison Square Garden were included, but the Streets did come to an agreement to have their home games aired on MSG Network.

=== 2019 season ===
The Streets played their first game on April 13, 2019, a 52–41 win over the Jacksonville Sharks in Jacksonville. A week later, they played their first home game on April 20 against the Orlando Predators. The playing area at Westchester County Center was not large enough for a regulation 50-yard field, so the Streets marked their 38-yard field to make it appear to be regulation sized. The NAL was unaware of the disparity until it was pointed out by local media. The Streets won, 70–31, and the team was allowed to keep their "short" field.

After splitting their next two contests, the Streets were 3–1 and atop the NAL standings. Then, a series of injuries depleted the roster, and New York lost eight consecutive games. During their final home game on July 21 against the Carolina Cobras, the Streets trailed at halftime, 46–0. During the first half, the visitors' locker room was robbed, with several Cobras players' personal items stolen. Despite their big lead, Carolina refused to return to the field; later, a coproduction coordinator for the Streets was arrested for stealing approximately $3,000 in cash from the locker room, as well as swiping $1,000 the previous game from a Streets cheerleader. A week later, the NAL fined the Streets for not providing adequate security but awarded New York a forfeit win due to the Cobras refusing to play, which the league viewed as detrimental to the public image of the league. The Streets then ended the season with a final 50–35 road loss to the Massachusetts Pirates on July 27 to finish with a 4–10 record.

=== Folding ===
The Streets' website went offline before the 2019 offseason. They were not mentioned in the schedule for the 2020 NAL season, which was ultimately cancelled due to the COVID-19 pandemic.

== Statistics ==
=== Season-by-season results ===
League champions	Playoff berth	League leader

Season	League	Regular season				Postseason results
Season	League	Finish	Wins	Losses	Ties	Postseason results
2019	NAL	5th	4	10	0	
Totals			4	10	0	All-time regular season record (2019)
Totals			0	0	—	All-time postseason record (2019)
Totals			4	10	0	All-time regular season and postseason record (2019)

=== Head coaches ===
Note: Statistics are correct through the 2019 National Arena League regular season.

Name	Term	Regular season				Playoffs		Awards
Name	Term	W	L	T	Win%	W	L	Awards
Rick Marsilio	2019	4	10	0	.286	0	0	
