= ASI Panthers =

Indoor football team in Pennsylvania, US

Logo

General information
- Founded: 2013
- Folded: 2016
- Headquartered: Santander Arena in Reading, Pennsylvania
- Colors: Blue, Black, White
- ASIPanthers.com

Personnel
- Owner: Bill Mattis
- General manager: Will Mattis
- Head coach: Bill Mattis

Team history
- ASI Panthers (2013–2016)

Home fields
- Santander Arena (2015)

League / conference affiliations
- American Indoor Football (2015); Supreme Indoor Football (2016)

Playoff appearances (1)
- AIF: 2015

The AllStarInc Panthers were a professional indoor football team based in Reading, Pennsylvania. They were members of American Indoor Football (AIF) for the 2015 season. The Panthers played their home games at Santander Arena in Reading.

== History ==
The ASI Panthers had previously existed as a semi-independent indoor team; the Panthers were one of the teams in AllStarInc's "ASI Developmental Football League." The team's 2014 schedule included games against the Erie Explosion and Baltimore Mariners.

On October 10, 2014, American Indoor Football (AIF) announced that the ASI Panthers would be joining the league as part 2015 expansion. The Panthers were officially announced as a 2015 expansion team of the AIF in November 2014. The Panthers left AIF after the 2015 season and announced they would play an independent schedule. In January 2016, the Indoor Football Alliance (IFA) included the Panthers in their 2016 draft and listed them as a member. The IFA failed to launch that season and the Panthers played in the semi-pro, outdoor Minor League Football (MLF). The semi-pro team has since changed its name to the Penn Panthers.

== Notable players ==
=== Roster ===
ASI Panthers roster
Quarterbacks: 11 Stephen Panasuk; Running backs: 32 Markus McFolling; Wide receivers: 2 Matthew Brown; 17 Darryl Shine; 5 Tyriq Smith	Offensive linemen: 69 Raquale Burnett; 56 Byron Pinkston; 66 Darryl Pringle; 72 Khamil Rangolam; Defensive linemen: 99 Dyrell Porcha	Linebackers: 33 Isaiah Fleming; 8 Gary Onuekwusi; Defensive backs: 4 Vaughn Carraway; 22 Charles Faust; 8 Brandon McElwee; 21 Kwaheem Smith; 1 Troy Still; 16 Jamil Williams; Kickers: 15 Jimmy Allen	Injured Reserve: currently vacant; Exempt List: currently vacant; Practice squad: currently vacant; rookies in italics; Roster updated January 18, 2016; 19 Active, 0 Inactive

=== Awards and honors ===
The following is a list of all ASI Panthers players who have won league Awards

Season	Player	Position	Award
2015	John Williams	DB	AIF Defensive MVP

=== All-League players ===
The following Panthers players have been named to All-League Teams:

- WR Daryl Shine (1)
- OL Mohamed Kourouma (1), Oscar Gonzalez (1), Zion Pyatt (1)
- DL Jonas Celian (1), Abe Koroma (1), Tim Hume (1)
- LB Herschel Thornton (1)
- DB John Williams (1)

== Coaches of note ==
=== Head coaches ===
Note: Statistics are correct through the end of the 2015 American Indoor Football season.

Name	Term	Regular season				Playoffs		Awards
Name	Term	W	L	T	Win%	W	L	Awards
Bernie Nowotarski	2015	5	3	0	.625	0	1	

=== Coaching staff ===
ASI Panthers staff
Front office: Owner/CEO – Bill Mattis; General manager – Will Mattis; Assistant general manager – Tony Segura; Media relations – Mariana Boguski; Head coach: Head coach/offensive coordinator – Bernie Nowotarski; Associate head coach – Bill Mattis	Offensive coaches: Offensive assistant – Mike Carr; Offensive assistant – Jeff Anderton; Defensive coaches: Defensive coordinator – Le'Roy Kelly; Defensive assistant – Nick McCarthy; Special teams: Special teams coordinator – Erik Rockhold

== Season-by-season results ==
League champions	Conference champions	Division champions	Wild card berth	League leader

Season	Team	League	Conference	Division	Regular season				Postseason results
Season	Team	League	Conference	Division	Finish	Wins	Losses	Ties	Postseason results
2015	2015	AIF			4th	5	3	0	Lost AIF Semifinal (York) 58-68
Totals						5	3	0	All-time regular season record (2015)
Totals						0	1	-	All-time postseason record (2015)
Totals						5	4	0	All-time regular season and postseason record (2015)
