= E. J. Nemeth =

American football player and coach (born 1983)

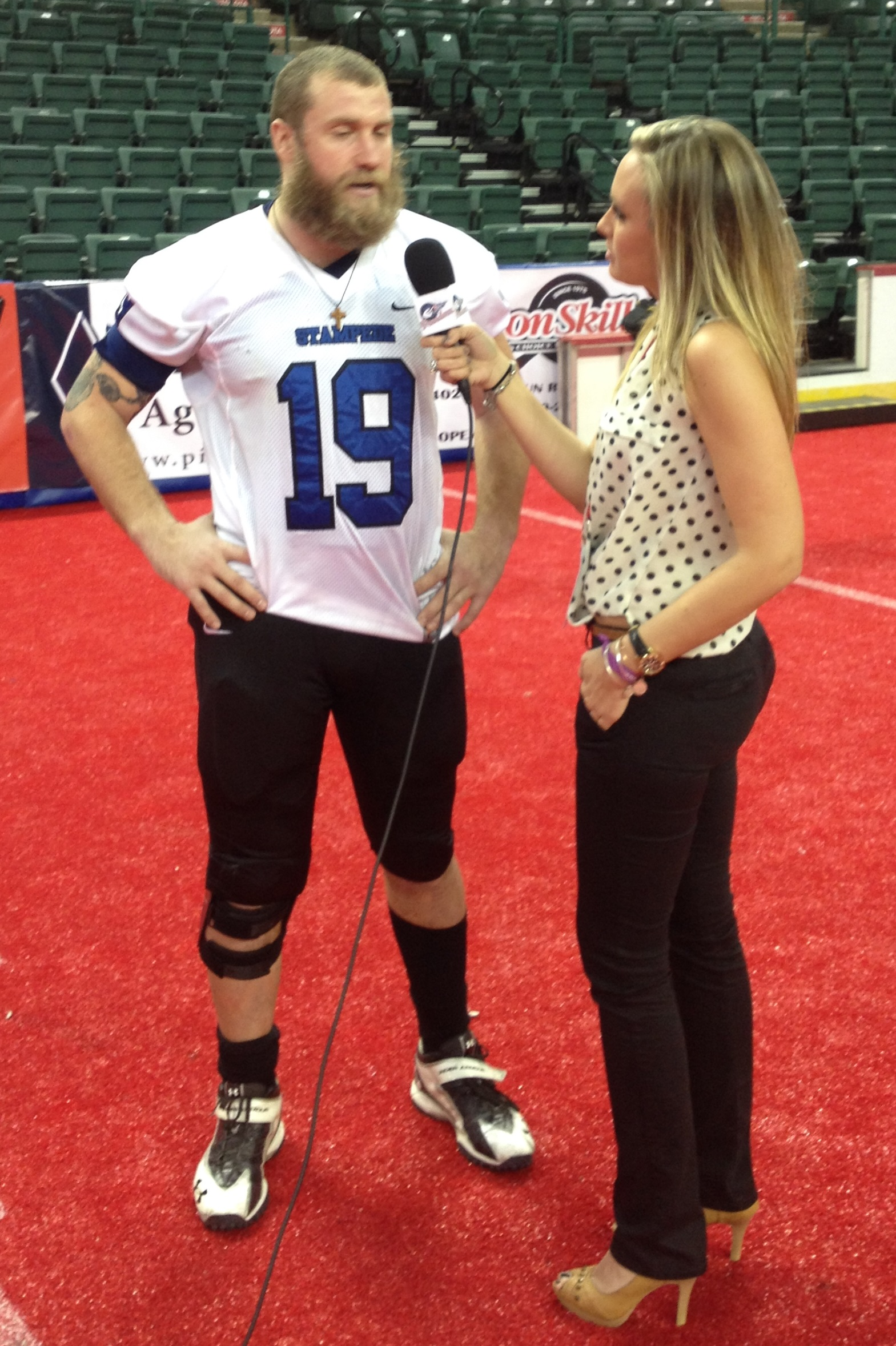
- Nemeth being interviewed post game after a game at Trenton Freedom

No. 4, 19, 15
- Position: Quarterback

Personal information
- Born: May 23, 1983 (age 43); Springfield, Massachusetts, U.S.
- Listed height: 6 ft 4 in (1.93 m)
- Listed weight: 245 lb (111 kg)

Career information
- High school: Notre Dame (Lawrenceville, New Jersey)
- College: King's College (PA)
- NFL draft: 2005: undrafted

Career history

Playing
- Reading Express (2007); San Angelo Stampede Express (2008); New Jersey Revolution (2008); Alaska Wild (2008); Baltimore Mariners (2009–2010); Trenton Steel (2011); Utah Blaze (2011); Harrisburg Stampede (2012–2014); York Capitals (2015); New York Streets (2019); Atlantic City Blackjacks (2019)

Coaching
- Stevenson (2013–2015) Assistant

Awards and highlights
- 3× AIF champion (2010, 2013, 2015); AIFA Player of the Year (2010); AIF Player of the Year (2012, 2013); 2nd Team All-PIFL (2014); AIF MVP (2015); AIF Offensive MVP (2015); 1st Team All-AIF (2015)
- Stats at ArenaFan.com

Ernest Joseph "E. J." Nemeth is an American former professional football quarterback. He played college football at Sacred Heart University and King's College. He won the American Indoor Football (AIF) championship three times, in 2010, 2013, and 2015.

== Early life ==
Nemeth attended Notre Dame High School in Lawrence Township, New Jersey, where he graduated in 2001.

== College career ==
Nemeth attended Sacred Heart University upon his high school graduation, continuing his football career. After two seasons with Sacred Heart, Nemeth transferred to King's College (PA) where he would use one season eligibility. After 2003, Nemeth dropped out to become a beer distributor.

Nemeth re-enrolled in college in 2010 at Towson University, but dropped out due to financial restrictions. He re-enrolled at Towson in 2013.

== Professional career ==
In 2015, Nemeth signed with the York Capitals of American Indoor Football. Nemeth's play won him both the Offensive MVP and the League MVP in 2015. In 2019, he signed with the New York Streets. After leaving the Streets, Nemeth signed with the Atlantic City Blackjacks.

== Coaching career ==
Nemeth was an assistant coach for the Stevenson Mustangs of Stevenson University from 2013 to 2015. In July 2015, he was named the head wrestling coach at Notre Dame High School.
