= Cleveland Patriots =

Professional indoor American football team

General information
- Founded: 2014
- Folded: 2014
- Headquartered: Warrensville Heights, Ohio at the Multiplex
- Colors: Black, Blue, White

Personnel
- Owner: Brandon Ikard
- Head coach: Fred Johnson
- President: Brandon Ikard

Team history
- Cleveland Patriots (2014)

Home fields
- Multiplex (2014)

League / conference affiliations
- American Indoor Football (2014)

The Cleveland Patriots were a professional indoor football team based in Warrensville Heights, Ohio. They were member of the American Indoor Football (AIF) league and played their home games at the Multiplex in Warrensville Heights. They are the third arena/indoor football team to play in the Cleveland area, with the others being the now defunct Cleveland Thunderbolts & Cleveland Gladiators of the Arena Football League.

== Front Office ==
- Brandon Ikard – CEO/Director of Football Operations
- Patrick Smith – Vice President of Operations
- Justin Robertson - Director of Marketing & Public Relations
- Fred Johnson - Director of Player Personnel
- Matt Stasek - Team Physician

== Coaching staff ==
- Fred Johnson - Head Coach
- Marcus McIntosh - Defensive Coordinator
- David Carr - Special Teams
- Curtis Ashley - Offensive and Defensive Line
