= Chicago Blitz (indoor football) =

American indoor football team

Logo

General information
- Founded: 2014
- Headquartered: Villa Park, Illinois at the Odeum Expo Center
- Colors: Gold, black, white

Personnel
- Owner: Mike Oliver
- General manager: Mike Dortch
- Head coach: Mike Oliver

Team history
- Chicago Blitz (2014–2016, 2018)

Home fields
- Odeum Expo Center (2014–2016); Grand Sports Arena (2018)

League / conference affiliations
- Continental Indoor Football League (2014): North Division (2014); American Indoor Football (2015–2016): Northern Division (2016); Midwest Professional Indoor Football (2018)

Playoff appearances (1)
- 2015

The Chicago Blitz were a professional indoor football team based in Villa Park, Illinois. The Blitz were members of American Indoor Football (AIF) in 2015 and 2016 and the Continental Indoor Football League (CIFL) in 2014. They played their home games at the Odeum Expo Center. The Blitz briefly joined the regional Midwest Professional Indoor Football (MPIF) for the 2018 season, but ceased operations once again after three games.

== Franchise history ==
=== 2014 ===
The Blitz came into existence in January 2014, after the Chicago Slaughter announced that they would be sitting out the 2014 season just one month before the regular season began. The team's name and logo (but not the colors) are an adaptation of the United States Football League franchise of the same name.

On February 9, 2014, the Blitz played their first ever game, losing 42–25 to the Saginaw Sting.

=== 2015 ===
On October 4, 2014, the Blitz announced they were joining X-League Indoor Football for the 2015 season. Shortly after, the team was removed from the X-League website, and was no longer affiliated with the X-League. On October 15, 2014, the Blitz joined American Indoor Football (AIF), following former CIFL team, the Sting. The Blitz finished the regular season 6–2, earning the 3 seed in the AIF playoffs. They defeated the 2nd seeded Saginaw Sting 63–45 in the AIF semifinals, earning a berth in the 2015 AIF Championship Game. The Blitz traveled to York, Pennsylvania to take on the York Capitals for the AIF crown. The Blitz fell to the Capitals 30–58.

=== 2016 ===
The Blitz played their second season in the AIF as members of the Northern Division. The team earned a 3–3 record but cancelled their final game of the season at the West Michigan Ironmen and team owner Mike Oliver immediately announced that the team was for sale. After the season ended, the AIF removed the Blitz from its team listings.

=== 2018 ===
The Blitz returned for the 2018 season as members of the regional Midwest Professional Indoor Football (MPIF). The Blitz began their season on the road, defeating the Cincinnati Flex 46–33. The Flex folded shortly afterwards. The Blitz then lost to the Midway Marauders (28–38) and West Michigan Ironmen (41–68). On March 30, 2018, the Blitz announced they had left the MPIF stating: "This is not the brand of football the Chicago Blitz has been accustomed to in the past, nor is it a brand we want to be associated with, from league standards to their flagship team." The Blitz then canceled the rest of their 2018 games.

== Season-by-season results ==
League champions	Conference champions	Division champions	Playoff Berth	League leader

Season	Team	League	Conference	Division	Regular season				Postseason results
Season	Team	League	Conference	Division	Finish	Wins	Losses	Ties	Postseason results
2014	2014	CIFL		North	3rd	7	3	0	
2015	2015	AIF			3rd	6	2	0	Won AIF Semifinals (Saginaw) 63–45; Lost AIF Championship Game (York) 30–58
2016	2016	AIF		Northern		3	3	0	
2018	2018	MPIF				1	2	0	
Totals						17	10	0	All-time regular season record (2014–2016)
Totals						1	1	—	All-time postseason record (2014–2018)
Totals						18	11	0	All-time regular season and postseason record (2014–2018)

== Notable players ==
=== Awards and honors ===
The following is a list of all Chicago Blitz players who have won league awards

Season	Player	Position	Award
2014	Julie Harshbarger	K	CIFL Special Teams of the Year
2015	Julie Harshbarger	K	AIF Special Teams of the Year

=== All-League players ===
The following Blitz players have been named to All-League Teams:

- QB Juice Williams (1)
- RB Bryant Pascascio (1)
- WR David Brown (1), Kent McDonald (1), Brian Miles (1)
- OL Anthony Bullock (1)
- DL DeAndre Mosely (2), Shonn Bell (1), Tyrone Saunders Jr. (1)
- LB Sam Fornelli (1)
- DB Chris Muhammad (1)
- K Julie Harshbarger (2)

== Notable coaches ==
=== Head coaches ===
Name	Term	Regular season				Playoffs		Awards
Name	Term	W	L	T	Win%	W	L	Awards
Mike Oliver	2014–2016, 2018	17	10	0	.630	1	1	

- Dennison Robinson – assistant defensive coordinator
