= York City Ice Arena =

Ice rink in York, Pennsylvania, U.S.

Coordinates: 39.9543°N 76.7101°W

- Interactive map of York City Ice Arena
- Location: 941 Vander Avenue; York, Pennsylvania 17403
- Owner: City of York
- Operator: York Revolution
- Type: Twin-sheet arena
- Capacity: 1,000 (2 x 500)
- Surface: Ice
- Scoreboard: Yes

Construction
- Opened: 2001
- Renovated: September 2004

Tenants
- York Devils (York Ice Hockey Club); York Capitals (AIF) (2013–2015)

Website
- yorkskate.com

The York City Ice Arena is a 1,000-seat rink in York, Pennsylvania, U.S. Renovated in September 2004, it hosts local public skating, ice hockey, and figure skating. It was the home field of the York Capitals in the AIF from 2013 to 2015 before the team moved to Harrisburg as the Central Penn Capitals. College Hockey East held their inaugural season playoffs at York City Ice Arena in February 2014. The arena received brief international media coverage after a player's upset parent broke a panel of safety glass during a hockey game on January 19, 2015.
