= Central Penn Capitals =

Former professional indoor football team in Pennsylvania, U.S.

Logo

General information
- Founded: 2012
- Folded: 2016
- Headquartered: Pennsylvania Farm Show Complex & Expo Center in Harrisburg, Pennsylvania
- Colors: Navy blue, red, white, silver
- Central Penn Capitals

Personnel
- Owner: Isaac Carn
- General manager: Donnie Parker
- Head coach: Andre Coles

Team history
- York Capitals (2013–2015); Central Penn Capitals (2016)

Home fields
- York City Ice Arena (2013–2015); Pennsylvania Farm Show Complex & Expo Center (2016)

League / conference affiliations
- American Indoor Football (2013–2016): Northern Division (2016)

Championships
- League championships: 1; 2015

Playoff appearances (2)
- 2013, 2015

The Central Penn Capitals (formerly the York Capitals) were a professional indoor football team based in Harrisburg, Pennsylvania. The Capitals played as members of American Indoor Football (AIF) from 2013 to 2016. The club was established in 2012 as an expansion team for the 2013 season when Jim Morris secured the rights to an AIF franchise in York, Pennsylvania at the York City Ice Arena. The team relocated to Harrisburg for the 2016 season with home games played at the Pennsylvania Farm Show Complex & Expo Center. The AIF ceased operations after the 2016 season and the Capitals did not join another league.

The Capitals were York's first indoor/arena football team. They were Harrisburg's second such team, the first being the Harrisburg Stampede, which played in the AIF (and its predecessors the AIFA and SIFL) from 2009 until 2013 before moving to Hershey and the Professional Indoor Football League the following season.

== Franchise history ==
In October 2012, it was announced that York, Pennsylvania had been awarded an expansion franchise of American Indoor Football (AIF). The franchise announced the following week that they would be holding a name-the-team contest open to York fans. The finalist of the team names came out to "Capitals", "Patriots", "Renegades", "Independence" and "Colonials", with Capitals gaining 49.2% of the votes to be the official nickname. The team's name refers to the city's colonial heritage, with the Continental Congress having completed the final draft of the Articles of Confederation while it met in York during ten months of the Revolutionary War. York is thus considered one of the first capitals of the United States.

The team introduced its first four players during a news conference on December 5, 2012: Rafael Cooper (running back), Thomas Potts (linebacker), Archie Smith (defensive back/wide receiver), and Keith Stokes (wide receiver).

After the Capitals opened play with a 32–25 victory over the Washington Eagles, York battled to a 5–4 regular season record, securing a playoff spot. The Capitals faced in-state rival, the Harrisburg Stampede, with a chance to advance to the AIF Championship Game. The Stampede rallied in the 4th quarter with 17 points to win 51–41, ending the Capitals season.

For the 2014 season, the Capitals announced that Matt Steeple would coach the team.

On July 15, 2014, it was announced that Isaac Carn had purchased the Capitals from Jim Morris. Carn promptly named Eric Dorsey II the team's new coach, though Rick Marsilio was named the head coach before the season started. Marsilio was an assistant for the now defunct Harrisburg Stampede, and recruited multiple Stampede players to the Capitals. The recruiting helped, as the Capitals finished the regular season 8–0, clinching the 1 seed in the 2015 AIF Playoffs. The Capitals defeated the ASI Panthers 68–58 to clinch a berth in the 2015 AIF Championship Game against the Chicago Blitz. The Capitals defeated the Blitz 58–30, capturing their first-ever championship.

On October 14, 2015, it was announced that the Capitals were moving to Harrisburg and renaming themselves the Central Penn Capitals. The Capitals would finish fourth in the Northern Division after the regular season due to the folding of the Philadelphia Yellow Jackets, thereby qualifying for a playoff spot. However, after being announced as playing the West Michigan Ironmen in the division semifinals, they were removed from the schedule and replaced with the Southern Division's third place team, the Myrtle Beach Freedom. No statements from the team or league were made addressing the removal of the Capitals. At the conclusion of the 2016 season, the AIF ceased operations. The Capitals website was taken down during the summer of 2016 indicating they had ceased operations as well.

== Final roster ==
2016 Central Penn Capitals roster
Quarterbacks: -- Ray Wagner; -- Isiah Williams; Running backs: Currently vacant; Wide receivers: -- Kelvin Irving; -- Raymond Mack; -- Brian Richards	Offensive linemen: Currently vacant; Defensive linemen: -- Michael Bibbs; -- Kiem LeGrant	Linebackers: -- Kevin Cuffee; 8 Jermaine Thaxton; Defensive backs: -- Mark Grandville; -- John Kennedy II; -- Travis Proctor; -- Armar Watson; Kickers: -- Drew Newcomer	Injured reserve: currently vacant; Refused to report: -- Terrill Barnes WR (DNR); -- Bakari Brown WR (DNR); -- Jeff Joyle WR (DNR); -- Eric Liles RB (DNR); -- Collin Nelson DB (DNR); -- Jared Sampson DL (DNR); -- Quinn Way WR (DNR); Exempt list: -- Tanner Melson DL (Exempt); Rookies in italics; Roster updated May 25, 2016; 12 Active, 8 Inactive

== Awards and honors ==
The following is a list of all Capitals players who won league awards:

Season	Player	Position	Award
2014	Julius Gregory	WR	Co-MVP
2015	E. J. Nemeth	QB	MVP
2015	E. J. Nemeth	QB	Offensive MVP

=== All-League players ===
The following Capitals players have been named to All-League Teams:

- QB E. J. Nemeth (1)
- FB Sarron Anderson (1)
- WR Julius Gregory (1), Rob Jones (1), Rob Wright (1)
- OL Steven Brazzle (1), Jason Townsend (1), Victor Sesay (1)
- LB Chindy Agugua (1), Michael Woodhouse (1), Jermaine Thaxton (1), Bryant Lewis (1), Will Hines (1)
- DB Archie Smith (1), Armar Watson (1), James Pitts (1), Travis Proctor (1)

== Coaches of note ==
=== Head coaches ===
Name	Term	Regular season				Playoffs		Awards
Name	Term	W	L	T	Win%	W	L	Awards
Kelly Logan	2013	5	4	0	.556	0	1	
Matt Steeple	2014	2	5	0	.286	0	0	
Rick Marsilio	2015–2016	9	2	0	.818	2	0	
Andre Coles	2016	3	2	0	.600	0	0	

=== Coaching staff ===
Central Penn Capitals staff
Front office: Owner – Isaac Carn; Executive Vice President – Stephanie Riley; Director of football operations and player personnel – Milton Creary; Director of GameDay operations – Al Hamilton; Head coach: Head coach/offensive coordinator – Andre Coles	Offensive coaches: Running backs – Nelson Drew; Offensive line – Jake Minnich; Defensive coaches: Defensive coordinator – Archie Smith; Defensive line – Lo Locust

== Season-by-season results ==
League champions	Conference champions	Division champions	Wild card berth	League leader

Season	Team	League	Conference	Division	Regular season				Postseason results
Season	Team	League	Conference	Division	Finish	Wins	Losses	Ties	Postseason results
2013	2013	AIF			3rd	5	4	0	Lost Wild Card Playoff (Stampede) 41–51
2014	2014	AIF			5th	2	5	0	
2015	2015	AIF			1st	8	0	0	Won AIF Semifinals (Panthers) 68–58; Won AIF Championship Game (Blitz) 58–30
2016	2016	AIF	Northern		4th	4	4	0	
Totals						19	13	0	All-time regular season record (2013–2016)
Totals						2	1	—	All-time postseason record (2013–2016)
Totals						21	14	0	All-time regular season and postseason record (2013–2016)
