= Odeum Expo Center =

Convention center in Illinois, United States

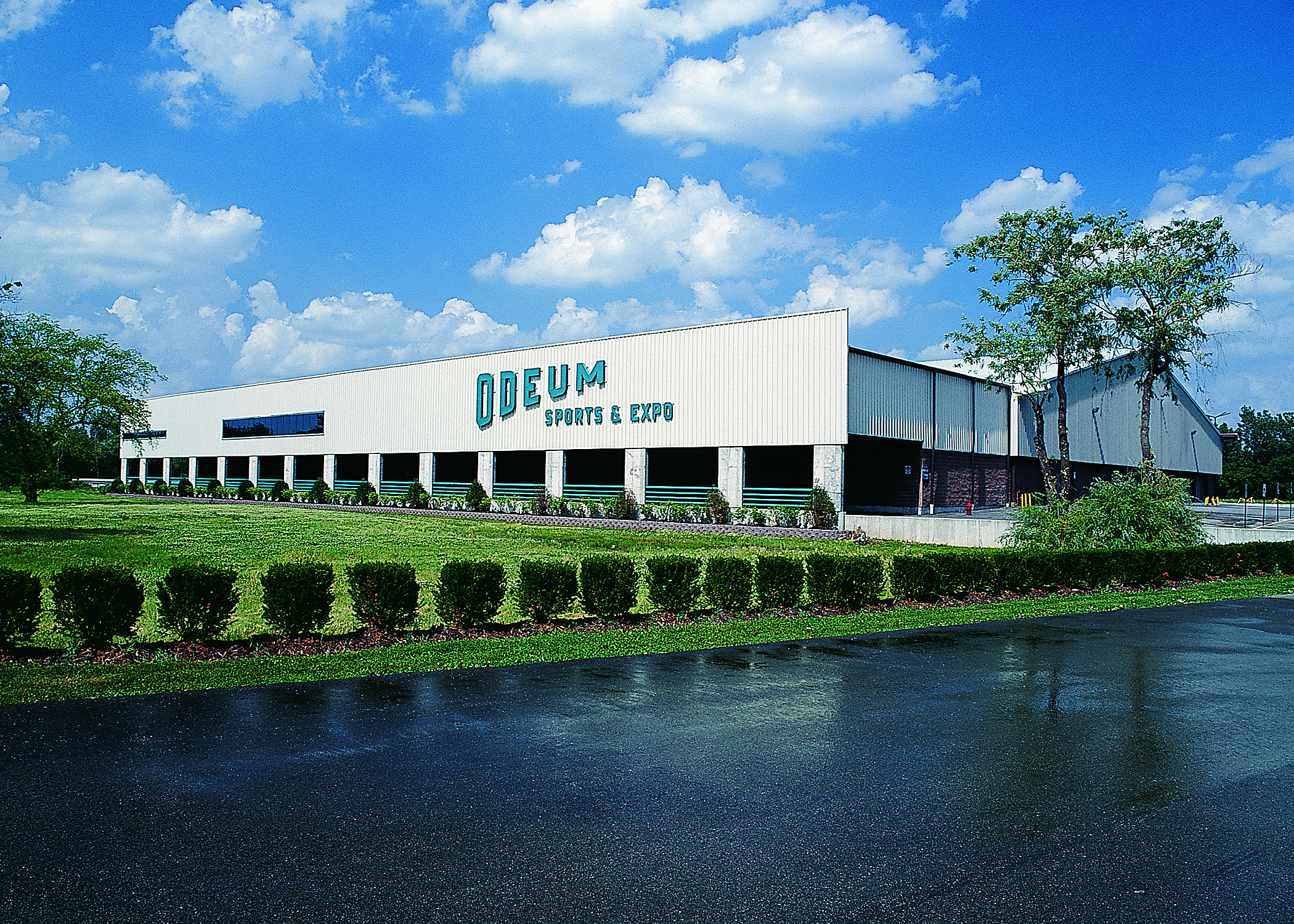
- Interactive map of Odeum Expo Center
- Location: 1033 North Villa Avenue, Villa Park, Illinois 60181
- Coordinates: 41.913711°N 87.970426°W
- Owner: Phil Greco
- Operator: Brad Walsh
- Capacity: 2,500 (football and soccer); 5,500 (boxing, wrestling and concerts)
- Surface: Artificial turf

Construction
- Opened: November 1981
- Closed: May 2022
- Demolished: 2022

Tenants
- Chicago Cheetahs (RHI) (1995); Chicago Riot (MISL) (2010–2011); Chicago Cardinals (CIFL) (2010); Chicago Mustangs (PASL) (2013); Chicago Blitz (CIFL/AIF) (2014–2016)

The Odeum Expo Center was a convention center located in Villa Park, Illinois. It featured 20,106 square feet (1,868 m^{2}) of exhibit space at the North Hall and 21,632 square feet (2,010 m^{2}) of exhibit space at the South Hall.

Both halls had pitched roofs as high as 50 feet (15 m). The South Hall was also used as an arena with an 85-by-194-foot artificial turf surface for indoor soccer or indoor football. It seated 2,500 for indoor soccer, football or lacrosse, and up to 5,500 for boxing, MMA/UFC, wrestling, and concerts. In addition, the Odeum Expo Center featured two mezzanines, the lower with 4,340 square feet (403 m^{2}) and the upper mezzanine with 13,024 square feet (1,210 m^{2}) and a roof up to 40 feet (12 m). There were also 9,750 square feet (906 m^{2}) of meeting space and a 2,064-square-foot (192 m^{2}) lobby.

In 2010, the Odeum became the home to the Chicago Cardinals of the Continental Indoor Football League. Also in 2010 the Chicago Riot of the Major Indoor Soccer League began play at the Odeum Expo Center. In 2014, the Chicago Blitz professional indoor football team began play at the Odeum in the CIFL. They continued their home games through 2016 as a member of the AIF, until the league folded and team subsequently cancelled their remaining season games.

In January 2022, it was announced that the Odeum would be sold and permanently closed at the end of May 2022.

== See also ==
- List of convention centers in the United States
