= 2012 Chicago Pythons season =

- General manager: Rich Petroski Jr.
- Head coach: Rich Petroski Jr. (first 4 games; record 0-4) Richard Guy (final 5 games; record 0-5)
- Home stadium: Sports Zone

Results
- Record: 0-9
- Division place: 6th
- Playoffs: did not qualify

The 2012 Chicago Pythons season was the first and only season for the Continental Indoor Football League (CIFL) franchise.

On December 9, 2011 it was announced that the Vipers and the Evansville Rage would become the 5th and 6th expansion teams for the 2012 CIFL season. The Vipers will host only three games for the 2012 season and also have availability to host for the playoffs should they qualify. Co-owners Richard Petroski Jr. and Michael Duran are both looking to bring back a positive image for Chicago CIFL teams as last two have left a bad taste in the fans mouths. The team was originally scheduled to play their home games at the Odeum Expo Center in Villa Park, but later decided to play at the Megaplex in Homer Glen, Illinois. The team began the season as the "Chicago Vipers," but changed their names to the Chicago Pythons four weeks into the season when the Mike Duran became the sole owner of the team.

== Players ==
=== Signings ===
| Position | Player | 2011 Team |
|---|---|---|
| WR | Rafuu Armour | Chicago Knights |
| OL | Josh Coyle | Chicago Knights |
| QB | Anthony Kropp | Chicago Slaughter |
| RB | Bill Ziemba | Chicago Slaughter |
| DB/RB | Ricky Emery | Indianapolis Enforcers |
| K | Julie Harshbarger | Chicago Knights |
| DE | Jawann Hollaway | Indianapolis Enforcers |
| WR | Yvens Louis | Saginaw Sting |
| LB | Ian Picurro | Indianapolis Enforcers |
| WR | Neil Wilcox | Chicago Knights |

=== Final roster ===
2012 Chicago Pythons roster
| Quarterbacks: 11 Tim Collins; Running backs: 4 Ricky Emery; 30 Baque Petty; Wide receivers: 9 Dan Carter; 5 Al Sutton | Offensive linemen: 60 Isom Ethom; 70 Brandon Mize; 65 Chris Zeleny; Defensive linemen: 89 Kenny Henderson; 84 Corey Holloway; 56 Jawann Holloway; 87 Keith Mitchell; 51 Corey Mullins | Linebackers: 33 Ramon Lacey; Defensive backs: 31 Cole Cameron; 23 Mike Diesel; 21 Mike Phyfiher; 26 Justin Williams; Kicker: 99 Julie Harshbarger | Injured reserve: currently vacant; Exempt list: currently vacant; Practice squad: currently vacant; rookies in italics updated May 1, 2012; 19 Active, 0 Inactive, 0 PS |

== Regular season ==
=== Regular season ===
| Week | Date | Kickoff | Opponent | Results | | Game site |
| Week | Date | Kickoff | Opponent | Final score | Team record | Game site |
|---|---|---|---|---|---|---|
| 1 | March 10 | 7:30 p.m. EST | at Port Huron Patriots | L 49-52 | 0-1 | McMorran Arena |
| 2 | March 18 | 7:30 p.m. EDT | at Saginaw Sting | L 32-64 | 0-2 | Dow Event Center |
| 3 | March 23 | 7:30 p.m. EDT | at Dayton Silverbacks | L 13-48 | 0-3 | Hara Arena |
| 4 | March 31 | 3:15 P.M. EDT | at Indianapolis Enforcers | L 34-40 | 0-4 | The SportZone |
| 5 | April 7 | 7:30 p.m. CST | Saginaw Sting | Cancelled | | The Megaplex |
| 6 | April 15 | 7:30 p.m. EST | at Evansville Rage | L 29-39 | 0-5 | Swonder Ice Arena |
| 7 | April 21 | 7:30 p.m. EDT | at Dayton Silverbacks | L 21-50 | 0-6 | Hara Arena |
| 8 | April 27 | 7:30 P.M. EDT | at Saginaw Sting | L 16-61 | 0-7 | Dow Event Center |
| 9 | May 6 | 7:30 p.m. EST | at Dayton Silverbacks | L 17-23 | 0-8 | Hara Arena |
| 10 | Bye | | | | | |
| 11 | May 19 | 7:30 p.m. EDT | at Evansville Rage | L 6-36 | 0-9 | Swonder Ice Arena |

=== Standings ===
2012 Continental Indoor Football League
| Team | W | L | T | PCT | PF | PA | PF (Avg.) | PA (Avg.) | STK |
|---|---|---|---|---|---|---|---|---|---|
| x-Saginaw Sting | 8 | 0 | 0 | 1.000 | 482 | 175 | 60.3 | 21.9 | W 8 |
| x-Dayton Silverbacks | 8 | 1 | 0 | .889 | 408 | 218 | 45.3 | 24.2 | L 1 |
| Evansville Rage | 7 | 3 | 0 | .700 | 392 | 308 | 39.2 | 30.8 | W 3 |
| Port Huron Patriots | 4 | 6 | 0 | .400 | 316 | 319 | 31.6 | 31.9 | W 1 |
| Indianapolis Enforcers | 1 | 9 | 0 | .100 | 162 | 565 | 16.2 | 56.5 | L 6 |
| Chicago Pythons | 0 | 9 | 0 | .000 | 207 | 383 | 23 | 42.5 | L 9 |

=== Week 1: vs Port Huron Patriots ===
Week 1: Chicago Vipers at Port Huron Patriots – Game summary

| Quarter | 1 | 2 | 3 | 4 | Total |
|---|---|---|---|---|---|
| Vipers | 14 | 0 | 21 | 14 | 49 |
| Patriots | 26 | 14 | 6 | 6 | 52 |

at McMorran Arena, Port Huron, Michigan

- Date: March 10, 2012
- Game time: 7:30 p.m. EDT
- Game attendance: 1,214
- Referee: Rick Jackson

Game information

1st quarter

- Port Huron – (13:39) Tracey McIntyre 8-yard run (Musa O'Dah kick failed), Port Huron 6–0
- Port Huron – (12:02) Jose Morris 39-yard pass from Darryl Johnson (Tracey McIntyre rush), Port Huron 14–0
- Chicago – (8:06) Bill Ziemba 4-yard run (Julie Harshbarger kick), Port Huron 14–7
- Port Huron – (6:56) Tracey McIntyre 25-yard pass from Darryl Johnson (Musa O'Dah kick block), Port Huron 20–7
- Chicago – (5:40) Anthony Kropp 1-yard run (Julie Harshbarger kick), Port Huron 20–14
- Port Huron – (1:07) Jose Morris 19-yard pass from Darryl Johnson (Tracey McIntyre rush failed), Port Huron 26–14

2nd quarter

- Port Huron – (8:28) Team Safety, Port Huron 28–14
- Port Huron – (3:09) Dan Johnson 7-yard pass from Darryl Johnson (Musa O'Dah kick failed), Port Huron 34–14
- Port Huron – (0:40) Tracey McIntyre 11-yard run (Musa O'Dah kick failed), Port Huron 40–14

3rd quarter

- Chicago – (11:30) Dan Carter 12-yard pass from Anthony Kropp (Julie Harshbarger kick), Port Huron 40–21
- Port Huron – (8:27) Darryl Johnson 3-yard run (Musa O'Dah kick failed), Port Huron 46–21
- Chicago – (6:52) Dominique Jackson 27-yard pass from Anthony Kropp (Julie Harshbarger kick), Port Huron 46–28
- Chicago – (0:30) Khyree Copeland 22-yard run (Julie Harshbarger kick), Port Huron 46–35

4th quarter

- Chicago – (14:30) B.J. Harvey 13-yard interception return (Julie Harshbarger kick), Port Huron 46–42
- Chicago – (8:47) Dan Carter 5-yard pass from Anthony Kropp (Julie Harshbarger kick), Chicago 49–46
- Port Huron – (2:01) Mark Carter 1-yard run (Musa O'Dah kick failed), Port Huron 52–49

Passing

- Chicago – Anthony Kropp: 6/20, 98 yards, 3 TD
- Port huron – Darryl Johnson: 17/28, 184 yards, 4 TD

Rushing

- Chicago – Khyree Copeland: 5 att, 36 yards, 1 TD
- Port huron – Tracey McIntyre: 9 att, 71 yards, 2 TD

Receiving

- Chicago – Dominique Jackson: 2 rec, 51 yards, 1 TD
- Port huron – Jose Morris: 6 rec, 95 yards, 2 TD

In the first ever regular season game for the Vipers and Patriots, it was a tale of two halves. The Patriots started the scoring on an 8-yard run by Tracey McIntyre less than two minutes into the game followed by a 39-yard pass from Darryl Johnson to Jose Morris to grab a 14-0 Patriot lead. Chicago answered on a 4-yard touchdown run by Bill Ziemba, but the Patriots extended their lead to 20–7 as Johnson and McIntyre hooked up for a 25-yard touchdown pass. Chicago quarterback Anthony Kropp added a 1-yard touchdown run and Port Huron capped the first quarter scoring on a 19-yard touchdown pass from Johnson to Morris. The Patriots' first points of the second quarter came from a safety when the snap was over the head of Kropp and recovered by the Vipers in the end zone. Darryl Johnson threw his fourth touchdown of the half on a 7-yard pass to Dan Johnson. The Patriots added an 11-yard touchdown run by McIntyre to close the first half scoring. The Vipers outscored the Patriots 21–6 in the third quarter and pulled within 11, trailing 46–35. The third-quarter scoring was started by Chicago, who on a 12-yard pass from Kropp to Dan Carter. Port Huron quarterback Darryl Johnson added a 3-yard touchdown run to keep the Patriots' lead at 25. The next four scores in the game belonged to the Vipers. Kropp threw another touchdown pass to Dominique Jackson, this one 27 yards and Khyree Copeland added a touchdown run from 2 yards to end the third quarter. The 11-point lead heading into the fourth quarter quickly disappeared as defensive back Lawrence Harvey intercepted Johnson and returned it for a 13-yard touchdown. Just 30 seconds into the final quarter and the lead was trimmed to just four. The Vipers took their first lead of the game as Johnson completed a pass to Dominique Jackson at the Port Huron 16. Jackson fumbled the football and it was picked up by Dan Carter at the 5-yard line and taken in for a touchdown. Julie Harshbarger added the extra point and Chicago led 49–46. The game-winning score came with just over two minutes to play as Mark Carter scored from 1-yard out to put the Patriots up 52-49. Chicago had one last chance to tie the game, but Harshbarger's kick was no good as time expired.

With the loss, the Vipers fell to 0–1.

=== Week 2: vs Saginaw Sting ===
Week 2: Chicago Vipers at Saginaw Sting – Game summary

| Quarter | 1 | 2 | 3 | 4 | Total |
|---|---|---|---|---|---|
| Vipers | 0 | 10 | 14 | 8 | 32 |
| Sting | 28 | 12 | 8 | 16 | 64 |

at Dow Event Center, Saginaw, Michigan

- Date: March 18, 2012
- Game time: 7:30 p.m. EDT

Game information

1st quarter

- Saginaw (14:02) Charles Tarver 45-yard kickoff return (Keith Bartynski rush), Saginaw 8-0
- Saginaw (12:10) Jeff Austin 24-yard interception return (Tommy Jones pass to Jeff Austin), Saginaw 16-0
- Saginaw (6:20) Andrew Beaver 37-yard pass from Tommy Jones (Keith Bartynski rush failed), Saginaw 22-0
- Saginaw (1:15) Andrew Beaver 26-yard pass from Tommy Jones (Tommy Jones pass failed), Saginaw 28-0

2nd quarter

- Chicago (12:20) Anthony Kropp 3-yard run (Julie Harshbarger kick), Saginaw 28-7
- Chicago (2:15) Julie Harshbarger 25-yard field goal, Saginaw 28-10
- Saginaw (0:50) Charles Tarver 5-yard pass from Tommy Jones (Tommy Jones pass failed), Saginaw 34-10
- Saginaw (0:20) Zac Nichols 16-yard pass from Tommy Jones (Tommy Jones pass failed), Saginaw 40-10

3rd quarter

- Chicago (6:39) Khyree Copeland 17-yard pass from Anthony Kropp (Julie Harshbarger kick), Saginaw 40-17
- Saginaw (4:15) Keith Bartynski 1-yard run (Tommy Jones pass to Jeff Austin), Saginaw 48-17
- Chicago (1:49) Ricky Emery 10-yard run (Julie Harshbarger kick), Saginaw 48-24

4th quarter

- Saginaw (7:50) Keith Bartynski 10-yard run (Tommy Jones pass to Charles Tarver), Saginaw 56-24
- Chicago (5:50) Dan Carter 20-yard pass from Anthony Kropp (Bill Ziemba run), Saginaw 56-32
- Saginaw (3:00) Jeff Austin 35-yard pass from Tommy Jones (Tommy Jones pass to Keith Bartynski), Saginaw 64-32

Passing

- Chicago – Anthony Kropp: 19/38, 160 yards, 2 TD
- Saginaw – Tommy Jones: 12/23, 179 yards, 5 TD

Rushing

- Chicago – Khyree Copeland: 4 att, 12 yards, 0 TD
- Saginaw – Keith Bartynski: 8 att, 22 yards, 2 TD

Receiving

- Chicago – Khyree Copeland: 7 rec, 54 yards, 1 TD
- Saginaw – Andrew Beaver: 3 rec, 69 yards, 2 TD

With the loss, the Vipers fell to 0-2.

=== Week 3: vs Dayton Silverbacks ===
Week 3: Chicago Vipers at Dayton Silverbacks – Game summary

| Quarter | 1 | 2 | 3 | 4 | Total |
|---|---|---|---|---|---|
| Vipers | 0 | 6 | 7 | 0 | 13 |
| Silverbacks | 8 | 13 | 13 | 14 | 48 |

at Hara Arena, Dayton, Ohio

- Date: March 23, 2012
- Game time: 7:30 p.m. EDT
- Referee: Tim McGuire

Game information

1st quarter

- Dayton – (10:05) Tyler Waller 26-yard pass from Evan Sawyer (Zack VanZant kick blocked), Dayton 6–0
- Dayton – (7:56) Drew Fowler safety, Dayton 8–0

2nd quarter

- Dayton – (8:58) Evan Sawyer 6-yard run (Zack VanZant kick), Dayton 15–0
- Chicago – (0:52) Dan Carter 23-yard pass from Anthony Kropp (Julie Harshbarger kick failed), Dayton 15–6
- Dayton - (0:13) Bruce Peters 6-yard pass from Evan Sawyer (Zack VanZant kick failed), Dayton 21-6

3rd quarter

- Dayton – (9:05) Evan Sawyer 8-yard run (Zack VanZant kick failed), Dayton 27–6
- Chicago – (4:49) Dan Carter 7-yard pass from Anthony Kropp (Julie Harshbarger kick), Dayton 27–13
- Dayton – (1:19) Evan Sawyer 1-yard pass run (Zack VanZant kick), Dayton 34–13

4th quarter

- Dayton – (1:33) Lawrence Green 4-yard pass from Chris Stanford (Zack VanZant kick), Dayton 41–13
- Dayton – (0:19) Marcus Fails 25-yard interception return (Zack VanZant kick), Dayton 48–13

Passing

- Chicago – Anthony Kropp: 13/26, 170 yards, 2 TD
- Dayton – Evan Sawyer: 9/16, 93 yards, 2 TD

Rushing

- Chicago – Khyree Copeland: 9 att, 17 yards, 0 TD
- Dayton – Bruce Peters: 12 att, 78 yards, 0 TD

Receiving

- Chicago – Dan Carter: 5 rec, 85 yards, 2 TD
- Dayton – Tyler Waller: 3 rec, 44 yards, 1 TD

In the first quarter Sawyer hit a wide-open Tyler Waller on a 26-yard pass play and it was quickly 6–0 as the extra point was blocked. After a safety it was 8–0 Dayton after the first quarter.

In the second quarter after Chicago kicker Julie Harshbarger missed a 27-yard field goal Evan sawyer capped off an eight-play drive with a six-yard run and with the extra point made it 15–0 Silverbacks, but the Vipers came right back and scored with less than a minute to go in the first half; Anthony Kropp connected with Dan Carter, who made a one-handed catch in the end zone and it was 15-6 Silverbacks. Just seconds later the Silverbacks answered with a six-yard pass from Evan Sawyer to Bruce Peters and it was 21–6 at the half.

After the Silverback defense stopped the Vipers at their own 14, two plays later Evan Sawyer scored on an eight-yard run and a Zach VanZant extra point made it a 27-6 Dayton lead. Chicago came back with a score of their own on an Anthony Kropp nine-yard pass to Dan Carter; the extra point was good and it was 27–13 Dayton. Dayton put it away after Sawyer scampered in on a one-yard run with 1:19 left in the third quarter and it was 34–13 Silverbacks after the third quarter.

In the final quarter, Dayton's Chris Stanford hit Lawrence Green on a four-yard pass and Marcus Fails intercepted a pass and ran it in from 25 yards out and it was a 48-13.

With the loss, the Vipers fell to 0–3.

== Coaching staff ==
Chicago Vipers/Pythons 2012 staff
| Front office: Founder/Co-Owner – Michael Duran; Director of football operations – Steven Rico; Marketing/Public Relations – Angelo Christobal; Community relations – Shannon Medic; Head coach: Head coach – Richard Guy; Offensive coaches: Offensive coordinator – Steven Rico; Offensive line – John Hunt | Defensive coaches: Defensive coordinator/defensive line – John Hunt |
