= 2012 Indianapolis Enforcers season =

- Owner: K. C. Carter
- General manager: K. C. Carter
- Head coach: K. C. Carter
- Home stadium: The SportZone; 6601 Coffman Road; Indianapolis, IN 46268

Results
- Record: 1–9
- League place: 5th
- Playoffs: did not qualify

Uniform
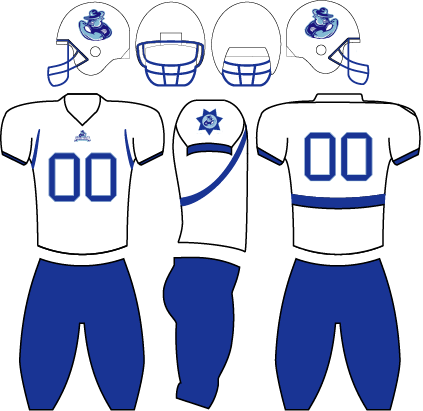

The 2012 Indianapolis Enforcers season was the second season for the Continental Indoor Football League (CIFL) franchise.

For the 2012 season, the Enforcers played their home games at The SportZone in Indianapolis, Indiana after playing the 2011 season as a travel team. The team removed defensive coordinator Tiny Lee, and replaced him with Brian Hendricks, who also served as the wide receivers coach in 2012. The team also announced the signing of CIFL veteran quarterback, Ron Ricciardi to help lead the offense. Ricciardi brought instant stability to the offense throwing five touchdowns in his first game coming off the bench. Those 5 touchdowns were more than any Enforcers quarterback had thrown all season in 2011.

On March 31, 2012, the Enforcers recorded their first ever franchise victory, second due to 2011 forfeit victory over the Port Huron Predators, with a 40–34 win over the Chicago Vipers.

== Players ==
=== Free agents ===
Position	Player	2012 team
DB	Sharif Ali	Indianapolis Enforcers
DB	Todd Blanton	did not play
LB	Zachary Cavanaugh	Indianapolis Enforcers
WR	Anthony Connors	did not play
LB	Caleb Conrad	did not play
OL	Jerome Cook	Indianapolis Enforcers
OL	Josh Cox	Evansville Rage
DB	Jay Cross	Indianapolis Enforcers
DL	Michael Cupp	Evansville Rage
RB/DB	Ricky Emery	Chicago Vipers
RB	Quentin Harris	did not play
DL	Jawann Hollaway	Chicago Vipers
OL	Bob Hogan	did not play
DL/RB	DeRon Jenkins	did not play
OL	Joe Jekel	did not play
DB	Karl Jones	Indianapolis Enforcers
WR	Matthew Midkiff	did not play
OL	Dontesz Motley	did not play
LB	Ian Picurro	Chicago Vipers
DB	Drew Russ	did not play
QB	DeMarcus Simons	Lakeland Raiders
WR	Troy Summers	did not play
OL	Darnell Taylor	Indianapolis Enforcers
QB	Dean Vinson	did not play
QB/WR	Mike Whitaker	did not play
OL	Todd Whitner	did not play
WR	Montez Williams	

Dt/ol Kenny Beal jr. 61

=== Signings ===
Position	Player	2011 Team
QB	Ron Ricciardi	Chicago Knights
DB	Donavan Evans	Dayton Silverbacks
WR	Willie Tolon	Chicago Knights

=== Final roster ===
2012 Indianapolis Enforcers roster
Quarterbacks: 9 Maurice Jones; Running backs: currently vacant; Wide receivers: 24 Lance Clay; 86 Dontae Hart; 2 Jeffery McClure; 5 James Sharpe	Offensive linemen: 79 Damion Arrington; 88 Robert Battle; 14 Darnell Taylor OL/FB; 56 Marcus Washington; Defensive linemen: 95 Zachary Bohnenstiehl; 93 Tony Gamble; 72 John Jackson; 61 Kenny Beal Jr.	Linebackers: 55 Marvin Davis; 13 Donte Jordan; Defensive backs: 30 Storm Alexander; 20 Sharif Ali; 21 Jay Cross; 31 Morgan Williams; Special teams: 7 Pavel Polochanin	Reserve lists: 11 Ron Ricciardi QB (IR); Practice squad: 6 Jamie Barnes WR; 51 Zachary Cavanaugh LB; 61 Jerome Cook OL; 15 Anthony Duckett QB; 8 Donavan Evans DB; 94 DaVon Haney; 4 Deshaun Holder RB; 12 Karl Jones DB; 61 Marshall Jordan OL; 23 James King; 23 Tim McMillon DB; 22 Eric Veazy RB; 3 Montez Williams WR; rookies in italics Roster updated April 24, 2012; 19 Active, 15 Inactive

== Regular season ==
=== Regular season ===
Week	Date	Kickoff	Opponent	Results		Game site
Week	Date	Kickoff	Opponent	Final score	Team record	Game site
1	March 11	3:00 P.M. EST	at Dayton Silverbacks	L 7–48	0–1	Hara Arena
2	March 17	7:30 P.M. EDT	at Evansville Rage	L 35–63	0–2	Swonder Ice Arena
3	March 25	4:30 P.M. EDT	at Saginaw Sting	L 18–91	0–3	Dow Event Center
4	March 31	3:15 P.M. EDT	Chicago Vipers	W 40–34	1–3	The SportZone
5	April 7	3:15 P.M. EDT	Port Huron Patriots	L 0–37	1–4	The SportZone
6	April 14	3:15 P.M. EDT	Dayton Silverbacks	L 15–62	1–5	The SportZone
7	April 21	7:30 P.M. EDT	at Evansville Rage	L 21–65	1–6	Swonder Ice Arena
8	April 28	7:30 p.m. EDT	at Port Huron Patriots	L 8–62	1–7	McMorran Arena
9	May 5	7:30 P.M. EDT	at Saginaw Sting	L 0–62	1–8	Dow Event Center
10	May 12	3:15 P.M. EDT	Evansville Rage	L 18–41	1–9	The SportZone
11	Bye					

=== Standings ===
2012 Continental Indoor Football League
Team	W	L	T	PCT	PF	PA	PF (Avg.)	PA (Avg.)	STK
x-Saginaw Sting	8	0	0	1.000	482	175	60.3	21.9	W 8
x-Dayton Silverbacks	8	1	0	.889	408	218	45.3	24.2	L 1
Evansville Rage	7	3	0	.700	392	308	39.2	30.8	W 3
Port Huron Patriots	4	6	0	.400	316	319	31.6	31.9	W 1
Indianapolis Enforcers	1	9	0	.100	162	565	16.2	56.5	L 6
Chicago Pythons	0	9	0	.000	207	383	23	42.5	L 9

== Regular season results ==
=== Week 1: vs Dayton Silverbacks ===
Week 1: Indianapolis Enforcers at Dayton Silverbacks – Game summary

Quarter	1	2	3	4	Total
Enforcers	7	0	0	0	7
Silverbacks	12	17	6	13	48

at Hara Arena, Dayton, Ohio

- Date: March 11, 2012
- Game time: 7:30 p.m. EDT
- Referee: Tommy Tyks

Game information

1st quarter

- Dayton – (12:41) Marcus Fails 7-yard run (Jeff Hubbard kick failed), Dayton 6–0
- Dayton – (1:48) Bruce Peters 4-yard run (Jeff Hubbard kick blocked), Dayton 12–0
- Indianapolis – (0:55) Jamie Barnes 23-yard pass from Anthony Duckett (Pavel Polochanin kick), Dayton 12–7

2nd quarter

- Dayton – (8:11) Evan Sawyer 1-yard run (Jeff Hubbard kick), Dayton 19–7
- Dayton – (5:18) Safety Trey Jackson, Dayton 21–7
- Dayton – (4:07) Evan Sawyer 24-yard run (Bruce Peters rush), Dayton 29–7

3rd quarter

- Dayton – (6:21) Evan Sawyer 1-yard run (Jeff Hubbard kick failed), Dayton 35–7

4th quarter

- Dayton – (14:44) Evan Sawyer 8-yard run (Jeff Hubbard kick), Dayton 42–7
- Dayton – (1:58) Tyler Waller 11-yard pass from Evan Sawyer (Jeff Hubbard kick failed), Dayton 48–7

Passing

- Indianapolis – Anthony Duckett: 7/21, 75 yards, 1 TD
- Dayton – Evan Sawyer: 9/23, 110 yards, 1 TD

Rushing

- Indianapolis – Eric Veazy: 1 att, 4 yards, 0 TD
- Dayton – Evan Sawyer: 8 att, 49 yards, 4 TD

Receiving

- Indianapolis – Jamie Barnes: 2 rec, 36 yards, 1 TD
- Dayton – Tyler Waller: 6 rec, 66 yards, 1 TD

The first quarter opened with Dayton scoring in the first two minutes of the game on a seven-yard run by Marcus Fails. The extra point by Jeff Hubbard failed and Dayton led 6–0. With a minute left in the first quarter, Bruce Peters ran in from four yards out and Dayton was up 12–0. The Enforcers scored with 55 seconds left in the quarter when Jamie Barnes caught a 23-yard pass from quarterback Anthony Duckett. The PAT was good by Pavel Polochanin.

Dayton continued with a second quarter. Halfway through the quarter, Evan Sawyer scored on a 1-yard run. Jeff Hubbard added the PAT and Dayton led 19–7. With 5:18 to play in the half, Trey Jackson recorded a safety and the Silverbacks were up 21–7. The first half scoring closed with 4:07 remaining on Sawyer's 23-yard run. Peters ran in for the two-point conversion and Dayton led 29–7 at halftime.

The second half belonged to the Silverbacks as well. Dayton scored six points in the third to lead 35–7 after three and added two more scores in the fourth to win going away 48–7. Sawyer had a memorable CIFL debut as he recorded five touchdowns (four rushing and one passing). Duckett, on the other, had one to forget, as he set an Enforcers, and CIFL, record with 7 interceptions. The 7 interceptions by the Silverbacks set a CIFL record for a single game. The previous record had been 6, held by the Cincinnati Commandos who set the mark in 2011 against Indianapolis.

=== Week 2: vs Evansville Rage ===
Week 2: Indianapolis Enforcers at Evansville Rage – Game summary

Quarter	1	2	3	4	Total
Enforcers	0	0	0	0	0
Rage	0	0	0	0	0

at Swonder Ice Arena, Evansville, Indiana

- Date: March 17, 2012
- Game time: 7:30 p.m. EDT
- []

Game information

1st quarter

2nd quarter

3rd quarter

4th quarter

Passing

- Indianapolis – ---: --/--, – yards, – TD
- Evansville – ---: --/--, – yards, – TD

Rushing

- Indianapolis – ---: – att, – yards, – TD
- Evansville – ---: – att, – yards, – TD

Receiving

- Indianapolis – ---: – rec, – yards, – TD
- Evansville – ---: – rec, – yards, – TD

With the victory, the Rage collected their first ever franchise victory. The Rage were led by quarterback Nate Samas who put the first points on the board with a four-yard keeper under two minutes into the game. Samas also added five touchdowns through the air. Rage running back Joe Casey played a versatile role in the victory as well. Casey racked up two rushing touchdowns and one receiving touchdown. Wide receiver Dusten Dubose compiled three receiving touchdowns from quarterback Nate Samas and receiver Terrence Wright added one receiving touchdown. During the game, the Enforcers set a franchise record for points scored in a game, with 35. Their previous high had been 19.

With the loss, the Enforcers fell to 0–2.

=== Week 3: vs Saginaw Sting ===
Week 3: Indianapolis Enforcers at Saginaw Sting – Game summary

Quarter	1	2	3	4	Total
Enforcers	6	12	0	0	18
Sting	14	39	26	12	91

at Dow Event Center, Saginaw, Michigan

- Date: March 25, 2012
- Game time: 4:30 p.m. EDT

Game information

1st quarter

- Saginaw (10:00) Zac Nichols 20-yard pass from Tommy Jones (Tommy Jones pass failed), Saginaw 6–0
- Indianapolis (6:40) Jamie Barnes 18-yard pass from Ron Ricciardi (Pavel Polochanin kick failed), 6–6
- Saginaw (3:30) Andrew Beaver 12-yard pass from Tommy Jones (Tommy Jones rush), Saginaw 14–6

2nd quarter

- Saginaw (14:30) Andrew Deweerd 40-yard interception return (Keath Bartynski pass from Tommy Jones), Saginaw 22–6
- Indianapolis (10:00) Willie Tolon 16-yard pass from Ron Ricciardi (Ron Ricciardi pass failed), Saginaw 22–12
- Saginaw (6:34) Keath Bartynski 11-yard pass from Tommy Jones (Zac Nichols pass from Tommy Jones), Saginaw 30–12
- Saginaw (2:00) Keath Bartynski 6-yard run (Zac Nichols pass from Tommy Jones), Saginaw 38–12
- Saginaw (0:36) Charles Tarver 17-yard pass from Tommy Jones (Anwar Jackson kick), Saginaw 45–12
- Indianapolis (0:10) James Sharp 3-yard pass from Ron Ricciardi (James Sharp rush failed), Saginaw 45–18
- Saginaw (0:03) Charles Tarver 50-yard kickoff return (Tommy Jones rush), Saginaw 53–18

3rd quarter

- Saginaw (14:48) Charles Tarver 50-yard kickoff return (Keath Bartynski rush failed), Saginaw 59–18
- Saginaw (13:20) John Jacobs fumble recover in the endzone (Anwar Jackson kick), Saginaw 66–18
- Saginaw (7:25) Keath Bartynski 10-yard run (Jonathan Horton kick), Saginaw 73–18
- Saginaw (1:55) Charles Tarver 18-yard pass from Tommy Jones (Anwar Jackson kick failed), Saginaw 79–18

4th quarter

- Saginaw (6:50) Anwar Jackson 2-yard run (Jonathan Horton kick failed), Saginaw 85–18
- Saginaw (2:20) Anwar Jackson 1-yard run (Jonathan Horton kick failed), Saginaw 91–18

Passing

- Indianapolis – Ron Ricciardi: 10/21, 72 yards, 3 TD
- Saginaw – Tommy Jones: 14/15, 190 yards, 5 TD

Rushing

- Indianapolis – Deshaun Holder: 6 att, 28 yards, 0 TD
- Saginaw – Keath Bartynski: 7 att, 51 yards, 2 TD

Receiving

- Indianapolis – James Sharp: 5 rec, 29 yards, 1 TD
- Saginaw – Charles Tarver: 4 rec, 73 yards, 2 TD

The Sting set a CIFL record by scoring 91 point in a single game. The previous high has been the Rochester Raiders in a 90–45 win over Lehigh Valley Outlawz on May 7, 2006.

== Coaching staff ==
Indianapolis Enforcers 2012 staff
Front office: Founder/Owner/President – K.C. Carter; Vice president/public relations – Tony Cunningham; General manager – Sharon L. Bingham; Secretary – Marcia Heath; Lady enforcers – Antoinetta Richmond; Head coach: Head coach – K.C. Carter; Offensive coaches: Offensive Coordinator –; Running backs/wide receivers – Brian Hendricks; Offensive line – Darryl Holland	Defensive coaches: Defensive coordinator – Brian Hendricks; Defensive line – Darryl Holland; Linebackers – Brandon Journey; Secondary –

== See also ==
- The Forum at Fishers
- 2011 Indianapolis Enforcers season
