= 2012 Port Huron Patriots season =

- Owner: David & Cynthia Kinsman
- General manager: David Kinsman
- Head coach: John Forti (fired March 30; 1–2 record); David Kinsman (interim; 3–4 record)
- Home stadium: McMorran Arena

Results
- Record: 4–6
- Division place: 4th
- Playoffs: Did not qualify

Uniform
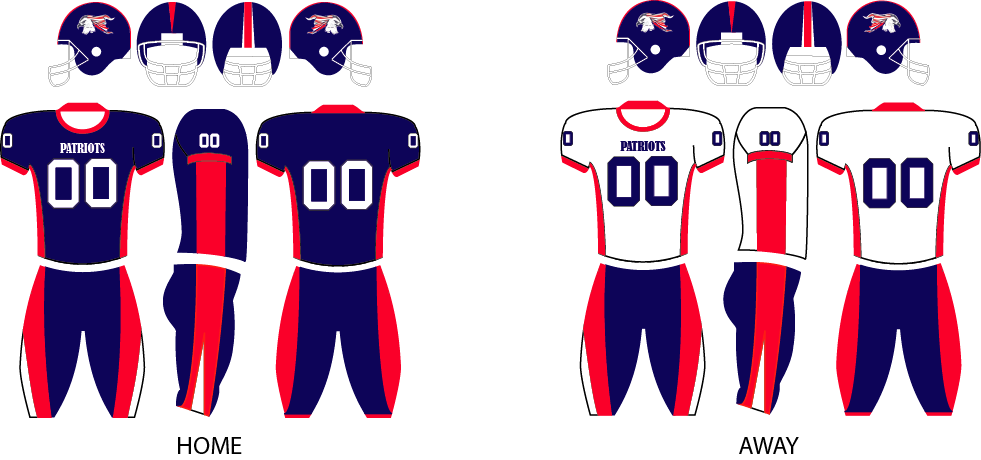

The 2012 Port Huron Patriots season is the first season for the Continental Indoor Football League (CIFL) franchise. After the disappointing end to the Port Huron Predators season in 2011, Dave and Cyndi Kinsman wanted to bring back a team to Port Huron in 2012 and the future. Kinsman stated, "We are aware of the history of teams in this city and the bottom line is that you have to win on and off the field to make this succeed. Other teams could win on the field, but couldn't win off the field meaning they didn't have the front office and leadership it takes to succeed. We are confident in the direction this franchise will head and we are thrilled to be in Port Huron." The team announced that they would be playing at McMorran Arena. In early September 2011, the Patriots signed former Pradators head coach John Forti, as well as re-signed local players who had played for the Predators. On December 24, 2011 the team announced its training camp roster.

On February 11, 2012, the team played its first ever preseason game. They defeated the outdoor semi-professional Southern Michigan Timberwolves 35-21. This first unofficial win came in the wake of the tragic loss of Offensive Lineman Ken Hamilton, who was killed in a shooting outside of a Detroit nightclub. Teammate Antonio Martin was also injured in the shooting.

On March 29, 2012, Kinsman fired the entire coaching staff consisting of Head Coach/Offensive Coordinator John Forti, Defensive Coordinator Ron Gadowski, Special Teams and Line Coach Ryan Nolin and Defensive Backs Coach Jude Carter. Kinsman named himself the head coach of the Patriots and hired the coaching staff from the Michigan Gators, a semi-professional team that the Patriots had played in the preseason.

Kinsman's decision to make himself the head coach did not sit well with some of the players, as a group, led by Terry Mitchell, left the team due to Kinsman's lack of football coaching experience.

Kinsman went on to lead the Patriots to a 3-4 record, making them 4-6 overall, clinching the 4th seed in the CIFL playoffs, but despite this factor, the league decided to shorten the playoffs. This left the Patriots and the Evansville Rage both out of the playoffs.

== Players ==
=== Signings ===
Position	Player	2011 Team
WR	Jose Cannon	Port Huron Predators
OL	Quentin Celano	Port Huron Predators
OL	Rodney Hamilton	Port Huron Predators
QB	Bruce Jones	Dayton Silverbacks
WR	Chris Kolokithas	Canton Cougars
OL	Antonio Martin	Port Huron Predators
DE	Mike Matyniak	Port Huron Predators
WR	Terry Mitchell	Port Huron Predators
DB	Musa Odeh	Port Huron Predators
DB	Ernie Smith	Port Huron Predators

=== Final roster ===
2012 Port Huron Patriots roster
Quarterbacks: 15 Stanley Flemons; 10 Torrance Webster; Running backs: 17 Adrien Brown; 24 Mike Youngblood; Wide receivers: 80 Desmond Benson; 3 Jose' Cannon; 1 Terry Mitchell; 88 Jose Morris	Offensive linemen: 59 Anthony Bagley; 78 Julian Davis; 72 Robert Garvin; 74 Mike Lewis; Defensive linemen: 95 Devin Bland; 92 Guy Goodelow; 99 Daniel Johnson; 90 Darryn Moore	Linebackers: 20 Mark Carter; 2 Clifton Jackson; 54 Andrew Knight; Defensive backs: 22 Gerald Benson; 4 Michael McKinley; 21 Musa O'Deh; 37 Ernie Smith; 23 Nick Thompson; Kickers: 5 Chris Kollias	Injured reserve: 76 Antonio Martin OL (IR); Inactive: currently vacant; Practice squad: 5 Justin Brantley K; 38 J. R. Estell DB; 87 Demetrius Hardy WR; 9 Darryl Johnson QB; 15 Bruce Jones QB; 72 Nicholas McCoy OL; 74 Steve Platz OL; 87 Terrance Tumpkin WR; 95 Martel Welch OL; 25 Trevor Whitkopf RB; rookies in italics Roster updated April 24, 2012; 25 Active, 1 Inactive, 10 PS

== Schedule ==
=== Preseason ===
Week	Date	Kickoff	Opponent	Results		Game site
Week	Date	Kickoff	Opponent	Final score	Team record	Game site
1	February 11	7:30 p.m. EDT	Southern Michigan Timberwolves	W 35–21	1–0	McMorran Arena
2	February 26	6:00 p.m. EDT	Michigan Gators	W 21–14	2–0	McMorran Arena

=== Regular season ===
Week	Date	Kickoff	Opponent	Results		Game site
Week	Date	Kickoff	Opponent	Final score	Team record	Game site
1	March 10	7:30 p.m. EDT	Chicago Vipers	W 52–49	1–0	McMorran Arena
2	March 17	7:30 p.m. EDT	Dayton Silverbacks	L 22–50	1–1	McMorran Arena
3	March 24	7:30 p.m. EDT	Evansville Rage	L 34–44	1–2	McMorran Arena
4	March 31	7:30 p.m. EDT	at Dayton Silverbacks	L 24–32	1–3	Hara Arena
5	April 7	3:15 p.m. EDT	at Indianapolis Enforcers	W 37–0	2–3	The SportZone
6	April 14	7:30 p.m. EDT	Saginaw Sting	L 35–49	2–4	McMorran Arena
7	April 20	7:30 p.m. EDT	at Saginaw Sting	L 20–42	2–5	Dow Event Center
8	April 28	8:00 p.m. EDT	Indianapolis Enforcers	W 62–8	3–5	McMorran Arena
9	May 5	7:30 p.m. EDT	at Evansville Rage	L 7–28	3–6	Swonder Ice Arena
10	May 12	7:30 p.m. EDT	Chicago Pythons	W 23–17	4–6	McMorran Arena
11	Bye					

=== Standings ===
2012 Continental Indoor Football League
Team	W	L	T	PCT	PF	PA	PF (Avg.)	PA (Avg.)	STK
x-Saginaw Sting	8	0	0	1.000	482	175	60.3	21.9	W 8
x-Dayton Silverbacks	8	1	0	.889	408	218	45.3	24.2	L 1
Evansville Rage	7	3	0	.700	392	308	39.2	30.8	W 3
Port Huron Patriots	4	6	0	.400	316	319	31.6	31.9	W 1
Indianapolis Enforcers	1	9	0	.100	162	565	16.2	56.5	L 6
Chicago Pythons	0	9	0	.000	207	383	23	42.5	L 9

== Regular season results ==
=== Week 1: vs Chicago Vipers ===
Week 1: Chicago Vipers at Port Huron Patriots – Game summary

Quarter	1	2	3	4	Total
Vipers	14	0	21	14	49
Patriots	26	14	6	6	52

at McMorran Arena, Port Huron, Michigan

- Date: March 10, 2012
- Game time: 7:30 p.m. EDT
- Game attendance: 1,214
- Referee: Rick Jackson

Game information

1st quarter

- Port Huron – (13:39) Tracey McIntyre 8-yard run (Musa O'Dah kick failed), Port Huron 6–0
- Port Huron – (12:02) Jose Morris 39-yard pass from Darryl Johnson (Tracey McIntyre rush), Port Huron 14–0
- Chicago – (8:06) Bill Ziemba 4-yard run (Julie Harshbarger kick), Port Huron 14–7
- Port Huron – (6:56) Tracey McIntyre 25-yard pass from Darryl Johnson (Musa O'Dah kick block), Port Huron 20–7
- Chicago – (5:40) Anthony Kropp 1-yard run (Julie Harshbarger kick), Port Huron 20–14
- Port Huron – (1:07) Jose Morris 19-yard pass from Darryl Johnson (Tracey McIntyre rush failed), Port Huron 26–14

2nd quarter

- Port Huron – (8:28) Team Safety, Port Huron 28–14
- Port Huron – (3:09) Dan Johnson 7-yard pass from Darryl Johnson (Musa O'Dah kick failed), Port Huron 34–14
- Port Huron – (0:40) Tracey McIntyre 11-yard run (Musa O'Dah kick failed), Port Huron 40–14

3rd quarter

- Chicago – (11:30) Dan Carter 12-yard pass from Anthony Kropp (Julie Harshbarger kick), Port Huron 40–21
- Port Huron – (8:27) Darryl Johnson 3-yard run (Musa O'Dah kick failed), Port Huron 46–21
- Chicago – (6:52) Dominique Jackson 27-yard pass from Anthony Kropp (Julie Harshbarger kick), Port Huron 46–28
- Chicago – (0:30) Khyree Copeland 22-yard run (Julie Harshbarger kick), Port Huron 46–35

4th quarter

- Chicago – (14:30) B.J. Harvey 13-yard interception return (Julie Harshbarger kick), Port Huron 46–42
- Chicago – (8:47) Dan Carter 5-yard pass from Anthony Kropp (Julie Harshbarger kick), Chicago 49–46
- Port Huron – (2:01) Mark Carter 1-yard run (Musa O'Dah kick failed), Port Huron 52–49

Passing

- Chicago – Anthony Kropp: 6/20, 98 yards, 3 TD
- Port huron – Darryl Johnson: 17/28, 184 yards, 4 TD

Rushing

- Chicago – Khyree Copeland: 5 att, 36 yards, 1 TD
- Port huron – Tracey McIntyre: 9 att, 71 yards, 2 TD

Receiving

- Chicago – Dominique Jackson: 2 rec, 51 yards, 1 TD
- Port huron – Jose Morris: 6 rec, 95 yards, 2 TD

In the first ever regular season game for the Vipers and Patriots, it was a tale of two halves. The Patriots started the scoring on an 8-yard run by Tracey McIntyre less than two minutes into the game followed by a 39-yard pass from Darryl Johnson to Jose Morris to grab a 14-0 Patriot lead. Chicago answered on a 4-yard touchdown run by Bill Ziemba, but the Patriots extended their lead to 20-7 as Johnson and McIntyre hooked up for a 25-yard touchdown pass. Chicago quarterback Anthony Kropp added a 1-yard touchdown run and Port Huron capped the first quarter scoring on a 19-yard touchdown pass from Johnson to Morris. The Patriots' first points of the second quarter came from a safety when the snap was over the head of Kropp and recovered by the Vipers in the end zone. Darryl Johnson threw his fourth touchdown of the half on a 7-yard pass to Dan Johnson. The Patriots added an 11-yard touchdown run by McIntyre to close the first half scoring. The Vipers outscored the Patriots 21-6 in the third quarter and pull within 11, trailing 46-35. The third quarter scoring was started by Chicago, who on a 12-yard pass from Kropp to Dan Carter. Port Huron quarterback Johnson added a 3-yard touchdown run to keep the Patriot lead at 25. The next four scores in the game belonged to the Vipers. Kropp threw another touchdown pass to Dominique Jackson, this one 27 yards, and Khyree Copeland added a touchdown run from 22 yards to end the third quarter. The 11-point lead heading into the fourth quarter quickly disappeared as defensive back Lawrence Harvey intercepted Johnson and returned it for a 13-yard touchdown. Just 30 seconds into the final quarter and the lead was trimmed to four. The Vipers took their first lead of the game as Johnson completed a pass to Dominique Jackson at the Port Huron 16. Jackson fumbled the football and it was picked up by Dan Carter at the 5-yard line and taken in for a touchdown. Julie Harshbarger added the extra point and Chicago led 49-46. The game winning score came with just over two minutes to play as Mark Carter scored from 1 yard out to put the Patriots up 52-49. Chicago had one last chance to tie the game, but Harshbarger's kick was no good as time expired.

With the win, the Patriots improved to 1-0.

=== Week 2: vs Dayton Silverbacks ===
Week 2: Dayton Silverbacks at Port Huron Patriots – Game summary

Quarter	1	2	3	4	Total
Silverbacks	14	16	6	14	50
Patriots	8	6	8	0	22

at McMorran Arena, Port Huron, Michigan

- Date: March 17, 2012
- Game time: 7:30 p.m. EDT
- Game attendance: 824
- Referee: Dave Stein

Game information

1st quarter

- Dayton – (8:09) Evan Sawyer 1-yard run (Zack VanZant kick), Dayton 7–0
- Port Huron – (5:52) Tracey McIntyre 4-yard run (Mark Carter rush), Port Huron 8–7
- Dayton – (1:47) Bruce Peters 7-yard pass from Evan Sawyer (Zack VanZant kick), Dayton 14–8

2nd quarter

- Dayton – (9:59) Zack VanZant 16-yard field goal, Dayton 17–8
- Dayton – (5:45) Antwain Weeden 25-yard pass from Evan Sawyer (Zack VanZant kick), Dayton 24–8
- Port Huron – (0:56) Terry Mitchell 6-yard pass from Michael McKinley (Carson Nowakowski kick failed), Dayton 24–14
- Dayton - (0:38) Antwain Weeden 52-yard kickoff return (Zack VanZant kick failed), Dayton 30-14

3rd quarter

- Port Huron – (7:30) Jose Morris 14-yard pass from Darryl Johnson (Darryl Johnson pass), Dayton 30–22
- Dayton – (4:13) Tyler Waller 44-yard pass from Evan Sawyer (Zack VanZant kick blocked), Dayton 36–22

4th quarter

- Dayton – (9:26) Bruce Peters 2-yard run (Zack VanZant kick), Dayton 43–22
- Dayton – (5:41) Marcus Fails 10-yard run (Zack VanZant kick), Dayton 50–22

Passing

- Dayton – Evan Sawyer: 7/16, 96 yards, 3 TD
- Port huron – Darryl Johnson: 10/21, 69 yards, 1 TD

Rushing

- Dayton – Marcus Fails: 3 att, 56 yards, 1 TD
- Port huron – Tracey McIntyre: 10 att, 38 yards, 1 TD

Receiving

- Dayton – Tyler Waller: 3 rec, 58 yards, 1 TD
- Port huron – Jose Morris: 3 rec, 33 yards, 1 TD

Dayton opened the scoring first with Evan Sawyer taking the ball in from 1 yard out. The PAT was kicked by Zack VanZant and the Silverbacks led 7-0. The Patriots came right back down the field and scored on 4-yard run by Tracey McIntyre with 5:52 left in the opening stanza. Mark Carter ran in the two-point conversion and the host led 8-7. Dayton took the next possession and moved down the field and answered the call with touchdown with 1:47 left in the quarter. Sawyer passed the ball to Bruce Peters from seven yards out, and VanZant added the PAT. At the end of the first quarter, Dayton led 14-8.

With 9:59 left in the first half, VanZant kicked a 16-yard field goal. With 5:45 left in the half, Sawyer threw a 25-yard touchdown pass to Antwain Weeden. The extra point was good and they led 24-8. Port Huron answered the bell when Terry Michell caught a 6-yard pass from Michael McKinley, but Carson Nowakowski's kick was no good. Weeden took the ensuing kickoff and ran 52 yards for a touchdown to close the half, but the PAT failed. At halftime, Dayton led 30-14.

Darryl Johnson threw a 14-yard pass to Jose Morris to open up the second half scoring. Port Huron went for two points and failed. Dayton then came back and scored with 4 minutes left in the quarter when Sawyer threw a 44 yards pass to Tyler Waller. The third quarter ended and the Silverbacks led 36-22.

In the fourth quarter, Dayton added two touchdowns to close out the scoring and win the game 50-22.

With the loss, the Patriots fell to 1-1.

=== Week 3: vs Evansville Rage ===
Week 3: Evansville Rage at Port Huron Patriots – Game summary

Quarter	1	2	3	4	Total
Rage	10	21	13	0	44
Patriots	14	6	6	8	34

at McMorran Arena, Port Huron, Michigan

- Date: March 24, 2012
- Game time: 7:30 p.m. EDT
- Game attendance: 923
- Referee: Dave Stein

Game information

1st quarter

- Port Huron (9:53) Mike McKinley 1-yard run (Mike McKinley rush), Port Huron 8-0
- Evansville (5:14) Terrence Wright 1-yard run (Kyle Doughtery kick), Port Huron 8-7
- Port Huron (4:27) Jose Morris 50-yard kickoff return (Mike McKinley rush failed), Port Huron 14-7
- Evansville (0:58) Kyle Doughtery 42-yard field goal, Port Huron 14-10

2nd quarter

- Evansville (11:56) Dusten DuBose 15-yard pass from Nate Samas (Kyle Doughtery kick), Evansville 17-14
- Port Huron (6:10) Darryl Johnson 3-yard run (Musa O'Deh kick blocked), Port Huron 20-17
- Evansville (3:55) Dusten DuBose 18-yard pass from Nate Samas (Kyle Doughtery kick), Evansville 24-20
- Evansville (0:22) Terrence Wright 45-yard pass from Nate Samas (Kyle Doughtery kick), Evansville 31-20

3rd quarter

- Port Huron (10:30) Jose Morris fumble recovery in the endzone (Musa O'Deh kick failed), Evansville 31-26
- Evansville (7:21) Dale Jennings 5-yard run (Kyle Doughtery kick failed), Evansville 37-26
- Evansville (1:47) Terrence Wright 27-yard pass from Nate Samas (Kyle Doughtery kick), Evansville 44-26

4th quarter

- Port Huron (10:13) Jose Morris 1-yard fumble recovery (Mike McKinley rush), Evansville 44-34

Passing

- Evansville – Nate Samas: 8/13, 160 yards, 4 TD
- Port huron – Darryl Johnson: 13/25, 109 yards, 0 TD

Rushing

- Evansville – Dale Jennings: 7 att, 29 yards, 1 TD
- Port huron – Mike McKinley: 8 att, 29 yards, 1 TD

Receiving

- Evansville – Terrence Wright: 4 rec, 116 yards, 2 TD
- Port huron – Jose Morris: 5 rec, 52 yards, 0 TD

With the loss, the Patriots fell to 1-2.

=== Week 4: vs Dayton Silverbacks ===
Week 4: Port Huron Patriots at Dayton Silverbacks – Game summary

Quarter	1	2	3	4	Total
Patriots	3	7	7	7	24
Silverbacks	0	19	7	6	32

at Hara Arena, Dayton, Ohio

- Date: March 30, 2012
- Game time: 7:30 p.m. EDT
- Referee: Tommy Tyks

Game information

1st quarter

- Port Huron (4:24) Chris Kolias 34-yard field goal, Port Huron 3-0

2nd quarter

- Dayton (12:14) Evan Sawyer 2-yard run (Zack VanZant kick), Dayton 7-3
- Dayton (0:51) Bruce Peters 4-yard pass from Evan Sawyer (Zack VanZant kick failed), Dayton 13-3
- Port Huron (0:38) Jose' Cannon 30-yard pass from Torrance Webster (Chris Kolias kick), Dayton 13-10
- Dayton (0:26) Bruce Peters 25-yard pass from Evan Sawyer (Zack VanZant kick failed), Dayton 19-10

3rd quarter

- Port Huron (11:27) Mark Carter 1-yard run (Chris Kolias kick), Dayton 19-17
- Dayton (5:04) Bruce Peters 4-yard run (Zack VanZant kick), Dayton 26-17

4th quarter

- Dayton (6:10) Melvin Thomas 40-yard interception return (Zack VanZant kick failed), Dayton 32-17
- Port Huron (0:06) Jose' Cannon 23-yard pass from Torrance Webster (Chris Kolias kick), Dayton 32-24

Passing

- Port huron – Torrance Webster: 9/26, 110 yards, 2 TD
- Dayton – Evan Sawyer: 13/20, 119 yards, 2 TD

Rushing

- Port huron – Torrance Webster: 6 att, 38 yards, 0 TD
- Dayton – Evan Sawyer: 4 att, 11 yards, 1 TD

Receiving

- Port huron – Jose' Cannon: 3 rec, 68 yards, 2 TD
- Dayton – Bruce Peters: 5 rec, 59 yards, 2 TD

After the team saw the entire coaching staff, quarterback and a kicker change, the Patriots went on the road for their first road game in franchise history against the undefeated Dayton Silverbacks. New quarterback Torrance Webster threw a pair of touchdowns to Jose' Cannon, and ran in another score. New kicker Chris Kolias was 1 for 2 on field goal attempts, and 3 for 3 in extra point attempts. In the end, it was Webster's three interceptions that cost the Patriots the game, as the final one was taken back 40 yards by Melvin Thomas to ultimately seal the win for the Silverbacks.

With the loss, the Patriots fell to 1-3.

=== Week 5: vs Indianapolis Enforcers ===
Week 5: Port Huron Patriots at Indianapolis Enforcers – Game summary

Quarter	1	2	3	4	Total
Patriots	0	0	0	0	0
Enforcers	0	0	0	0	0

at The SportZone, Indianapolis, Indiana

- Date: April 7, 2012
- Game time: 3:15 p.m. EDT

Game information

1st quarter
2nd quarter
3rd quarter
4th quarter

Passing

- Port huron – ---: --/--, --- yards, - TD
- Indianapolis – ---: --/--, --- yards, - TD

Rushing

- Port huron – ---: - att, -- yards, - TD
- Indianapolis – ---: - att, -- yards, - TD

Receiving

- Port huron – ---: - rec, -- yards, - TD
- Indianapolis – ---: - rec, -- yards, - TD

With the win, the Patriots improved to 2-3

=== Week 6: vs Saginaw Sting ===
Week 6: Saginaw Sting at Port Huron Patriots – Game summary

Quarter	1	2	3	4	Total
Sting	0	0	0	0	0
Patriots	0	0	0	0	0

at McMorran Arena, Port Huron, Michigan

- Date: April 14, 2012
- Game time: 7:30 p.m. EDT

Game information

1st quarter
2nd quarter
3rd quarter
4th quarter

Passing

- Saginaw – ---: --/--, --- yards, - TD
- Port huron – ---: --/--, --- yards, - TD

Rushing

- Saginaw – ---: - att, -- yards, - TD
- Port huron – ---: - att, -- yards, - TD

Receiving

- Saginaw – ---: - rec, -- yards, - TD
- Port huron – ---: - rec, -- yards, - TD

The Sting came into the game with a 3-0 record and were facing Port Huron for the first of two consecutive weeks playing each other for the rights to the "Michigan Cup." The Sting went on to defeat the Patriots by a score of 49-35. Saginaw's Tommy Jones led the way for the Sting, throwing six touchdowns.

With the loss, the Patriots fell to 2-4

=== Week 7: vs Saginaw Sting ===
Week 7: Port Huron Patriots at Saginaw Sting – Game summary

Quarter	1	2	3	4	Total
Patriots	0	0	0	0	0
Sting	0	0	0	0	0

at Dow Event Center, Saginaw, Michigan

- Date: April 20, 2012
- Game time: 7:30 p.m. EDT

Game information

1st quarter
2nd quarter
3rd quarter
4th quarter

Passing

- Port huron – ---: --/--, --- yards, - TD
- Saginaw – ---: --/--, --- yards, - TD

Rushing

- Port huron – ---: - att, -- yards, - TD
- Saginaw – ---: - att, -- yards, - TD

Receiving

- Port huron – ---: - rec, -- yards, - TD
- Saginaw – ---: - rec, -- yards, - TD

With the loss, the Patriots fell to 2-5.

=== Week 8: vs Indianapolis Enforcers ===
Week 8: Indianapolis Enforcers at Port Huron Patriots – Game summary

Quarter	1	2	3	4	Total
Enforcers	0	0	0	0	0
Patriots	0	0	0	0	0

at McMorran Arena, Port Huron, Michigan

- Date: April 28, 2012
- Game time: 7:30 p.m. EDT

Game information

1st quarter
2nd quarter
3rd quarter
4th quarter

Passing

- Indianapolis – ---: --/--, --- yards, - TD
- Port huron – ---: --/--, --- yards, - TD

Rushing

- Indianapolis – ---: - att, -- yards, - TD
- Port huron – ---: - att, -- yards, - TD

Receiving

- Indianapolis – ---: - rec, -- yards, - TD
- Port huron – ---: - rec, -- yards, - TD

The Patriots won an unusual game, as a majority of the Enforcers players decided not to travel with the team and they were forced to dress Port Huron players who were inactive for the game. The Patriots won, 62-8.

With the win, the Patriots improved to 3-5.

== Coaching staff ==
Port Huron Patriots 2012 staff
Front office: Founder/Co-Owner/General Manager – Dave Kinsman; Founder/Co-Owner/Financial Manager – Cyndi Kinsman; Director of game day operations and sales – Brandon Cope; Director of Jr. Stars League and Sales – Jude Carter; Head coach: Interim head coach – Dave Kinsman; Offensive coaches: Offensive coordinator – Daryel Henry; Offensive line – Darrel Rich	Defensive coaches: Defensive coordinator – Darrel Jones; Defensive line – Darrel Rich
