= 2012 Evansville Rage season =

- General manager: Eddie Cronin
- Head coach: Mike Goodpaster
- Home stadium: Swonder Ice Arena

Results
- Record: 7–3
- Division place: 3rd
- Playoffs: did not qualify

The 2012 Evansville Rage season was the first season for the Continental Indoor Football League (CIFL) franchise.

On November 16, 2011, the team announced its intentions to compete as full members of the CIFL for the 2013 season. The Rage had also already named their head coach on the same day, naming Mike Goodpaster to the position. Goodpaster was most recently the defensive coordinator of the Northern Kentucky River Monsters of the Ultimate Indoor Football League. On December 9, 2011, it was announced that the Rage were going become the final expansion team for the 2012 Continental Indoor Football League season. On March 6, 2012, owner and general manager, David Reed, resigned from the duties due to an illness in his family that requires his full attention. The same day, the Rage announced Eddie Cronin as the team's General Manager. Cronin had been a part of the organization from the start as the defensive coordinator. He continued to keep his position as defensive coordinator.

== Players ==
=== Signings ===
Position	Player	2011 Team
OL	Josh Cox	Indianapolis Enforcers
DL	Michael Cupp	Indianapolis Enforcers
OL	Trent Marlow	Dayton Silverbacks
QB	Nate Samas	Bricktown Brawlers

=== Final roster ===
2012 Evansville Rage roster
Quarterbacks: 13 Nate Samas; Running backs: 12 Joe Casey; 7 Terrence Wright; Wide receivers: 81 Ray Everhart; 5 Travis Poitier; 89 Matt Robinette	Offensive linemen: 70 Jordan Cooke; 76 Josh Cox; 78 Trent Marlow; 74 Matt Money; Defensive linemen: 92 Michael Cupp; 42 DeJuan Edmonds; 77 Robbie Piper; 95 Luke Scarbarough; 80 Malo Taumua; 93 Reco Tucker	Linebackers: 9 Jordan Burdue; 20 Blake Harris; 38 Quintin Patilla; Defensive backs: 2 Tarron Acuff; 22 Oscar Dyer; 23 Dekota Marshall; 4 Lamarr Stewart; 16 Mike Woods; Kickers: 15 Kyle Daugherty	Injured reserve: currently vacant; Exempt list: currently vacant; Practice squad: 12 Dale Jennings DB; 80 Monte Johnson WR; 80 Levron Williams WR; rookies in italics Roster updated April 30, 2012; 25 Active, 0 Inactive, 3 PS

== Schedule ==
=== Preseason ===
Week	Date	Kickoff	Opponent	Results		Game site
Week	Date	Kickoff	Opponent	Final score	Team record	Game site
1	March 3	7:30 P.M. EDT	Northern Kentucky Bulldogs	W 52–13	1–0	Swonder Ice Arena
2	March 10	7:30 P.M. EDT	Kentucky Xtreme	W 56–26	2–0	Swonder Ice Arena

=== Regular season ===
Week	Date	Kickoff	Opponent	Results		Game site
Week	Date	Kickoff	Opponent	Final score	Team record	Game site
1	Bye					
2	March 17	7:30 P.M. EDT	Indianapolis Enforcers	W 63–35	1–0	Swonder Ice Arena
3	March 24	7:30 P.M. EDT	at Port Huron Patriots	W 44–34	2–0	McMorran Arena
4	March 30	7:30 P.M. EDT	at Saginaw Sting	L 29–72	2–1	Dow Event Center
5	April 7	7:30 P.M. EDT	Dayton Silverbacks	L 41–52	2–2	Swonder Ice Arena
6	April 15	7:30 P.M. EDT	Chicago Pythons	W 39–29	3–2	Swonder Ice Arena
7	April 21	7:30 P.M. EDT	Indianapolis Enforcers	W 65–21	4–2	Swonder Ice Arena
8	April 28	7:30 P.M. EDT	at Dayton Silverbacks	L 34–41	4–3	Hara Arena
9	May 5	7:30 P.M. EDT	Port Huron Patriots	W 28–7	5–3	Swonder Ice Arena
10	May 12	3:15 P.M. EDT	at Indianapolis Enforcers	W 41–18	6–3	The SportZone
11	May 19	7:30 P.M. EDT	Chicago Pythons	W 36–6	7–3	Swonder Ice Arena

=== Standings ===
2012 Continental Indoor Football League
Team	W	L	T	PCT	PF	PA	PF (Avg.)	PA (Avg.)	STK
x-Saginaw Sting	8	0	0	1.000	482	175	60.3	21.9	W 8
x-Dayton Silverbacks	8	1	0	.889	408	218	45.3	24.2	L 1
Evansville Rage	7	3	0	.700	392	308	39.2	30.8	W 3
Port Huron Patriots	4	6	0	.400	316	319	31.6	31.9	W 1
Indianapolis Enforcers	1	9	0	.100	162	565	16.2	56.5	L 6
Chicago Pythons	0	9	0	.000	207	383	23	42.5	L 9

== Regular season results ==
=== Week 2: vs Indianapolis Enforcers ===
Week 2: Indianapolis Enforcers at Evansville Rage – Game summary

Quarter	1	2	3	4	Total
Enforcers	0	0	0	0	0
Rage	0	0	0	0	0

at Swonder Ice Arena, Evansville, Indiana

- Date: March 17, 2012
- Game time: 7:30 p.m. EDT
- []

Game information

1st quarter

2nd quarter

3rd quarter

4th quarter

Passing

- Indianapolis – ---: --/--, – yards, – TD
- Evansville – ---: --/--, – yards, – TD

Rushing

- Indianapolis – ---: – att, – yards, – TD
- Evansville – ---: – att, – yards, – TD

Receiving

- Indianapolis – ---: – rec, – yards, – TD
- Evansville – ---: – rec, – yards, – TD

With the victory, the Rage collected their first ever franchise victory. The Rage were led by quarterback Nate Samas who put the first points on the board with a four-yard keeper under two minutes into the game. Samas also added five touchdowns through the air. Rage running back Joe Casey played a versatile role in the victory as well. Casey racked up two rushing touchdowns and one receiving touchdown. Wide receiver Dusten Dubose compiled three receiving touchdowns from quarterback Nate Samas and receiver Terrence Wright added one receiving touchdown. During the game, the Enforcers set a franchise record for points scored in a game, with 35. Their previous high had been 19.

With the win, the Rage improved to 1–0.

=== Week 3: vs Port Huron Patriots ===
Week 3: Evansville Rage at Port Huron Patriots – Game summary

Quarter	1	2	3	4	Total
Rage	10	21	13	0	44
Patriots	14	6	6	8	34

at McMorran Arena, Port Huron, Michigan

- Date: March 24, 2012
- Game time: 7:30 p.m. EDT
- Game attendance: 923
- Referee: Dave Stein

Game information

1st quarter

- Port Huron (9:53) Mike McKinley 1-yard run (Mike McKinley rush), Port Huron 8–0
- Evansville (5:14) Terrence Wright 1-yard run (Kyle Doughtery kick), Port Huron 8–7
- Port Huron (4:27) Jose Morris 50-yard kickoff return (Mike McKinley rush failed), Port Huron 14–7
- Evansville (0:58) Kyle Doughtery 42-yard field goal, Port Huron 14–10

2nd quarter

- Evansville (11:56) Dusten DuBose 15-yard pass from Nate Samas (Kyle Doughtery kick), Evansville 17–14
- Port Huron (6:10) Darryl Johnson 3-yard run (Musa O'Deh kick blocked), Port Huron 20–17
- Evansville (3:55) Dusten DuBose 18-yard pass from Nate Samas (Kyle Doughtery kick), Evansville 24–20
- Evansville (0:22) Terrence Wright 45-yard pass from Nate Samas (Kyle Doughtery kick), Evansville 31–20

3rd quarter

- Port Huron (10:30) Jose Morris fumble recovery in the endzone (Musa O'Deh kick failed), Evansville 31–26
- Evansville (7:21) Dale Jennings 5-yard run (Kyle Doughtery kick failed), Evansville 37–26
- Evansville (1:47) Terrence Wright 27-yard pass from Nate Samas (Kyle Doughtery kick), Evansville 44–26

4th quarter

- Port Huron (10:13) Jose Morris 1-yard fumble recovery (Mike McKinley rush), Evansville 44–34

Passing

- Evansville – Nate Samas: 8/13, 160 yards, 4 TD
- Port huron – Darryl Johnson: 13/25, 109 yards, 0 TD

Rushing

- Evansville – Dale Jennings: 7 att, 29 yards, 1 TD
- Port huron – Mike McKinley: 8 att, 29 yards, 1 TD

Receiving

- Evansville – Terrence Wright: 4 rec, 116 yards, 2 TD
- Port huron – Jose Morris: 5 rec, 52 yards, 0 TD

With the win, the Rage improved to 2–0.

=== Week 4: vs Saginaw Sting ===
Week 4: Evansville Rage at Saginaw Sting – Game summary

Quarter	1	2	3	4	Total
Rage	14	7	0	8	29
Sting	16	22	18	16	72

at Dow Event Center, Saginaw, Michigan

- Date: March 30, 2012
- Game time: 7:30 p.m. EDT

Game information

1st quarter

- Saginaw (7:30) Zac Nichols 4-yard pass from Tommy Jones (Tommy Jones rush), Saginaw 8–0
- Evansville (5:00) Nate Samas 3-yard run (Kyle Doughtery kick), Saginaw 8–7
- Saginaw (4:30) Zac Nichols 25-yard pass from Tommy Jones (Tommy Jones pass to Charles Tarver), Saginaw 16–7
- Evansville 1:45) Terrence Wright 23-yard pass from Nate Samas (Kyle Daughtery kick), Saginaw 16–14

2nd quarter

- Saginaw (14:40) Tommy Jones 14-yard run (Kyle Doughtery kick), Saginaw 22–14
- Evansville (13:30) Dusten DeBose 20-yard pass from Nate Samas (Kyle Daughtery kick), Saginaw 22–21
- Saginaw (10:50) Andrew Beaver 13-yard pass from Tommy Jones (Tommy Jones pass to Andrew Beaver), Saginaw 30–21
- Saginaw (3:24) Zac Nichols 22-yard pass from Tommy Jones (Tommy Jones pass to Andrew Beaver), Saginaw 38–21

3rd quarter

- Sagianw (12:14) Keith Bartynski 5-yard run (Tommy Jones pass to Andrew Beaver), Saginaw 46–21
- Sagianw (1:56) Team Safety, Saginaw 48–21
- Sagianw (1:50) Charles Tarver 50-yard kickoff return (Tommy Jones pass to Zac Nichols), Saginaw 56–21

4th quarter

- Saginaw (11:31) Zac Nichols 19-yard pass from Tommy Jones (Keith Bartynski rush), Saginaw 64–21
- Evansville (7:41) Terrence Wright 47-yard run (Nate Samas pass to Joe Casey), Saginaw 64–29
- Saginaw (7:00) Keith Bartynski 13-yard run (Tommy Jones pass to Jeff Austin), Saginaw 72–29

Passing

- Evansville – Nate Samas: 8/24, 82 yards, 2 TD
- Saginaw – Tommy Jones: 15/23, 211 yards, 5 TD

Rushing

- Evansville – Terrence Wright: 5 att, 41 yards, 1 TD
- Saginaw – Tommy Jones: 3 att, 36 yards, 1 TD

Receiving

- Evansville – Dusten DeBose: 3 rec, 44 yards, 1 TD
- Saginaw – Zac Nichols: 8 rec, 162 yards, 4 TD

With the loss, the Rage fell to 2–1.

== Coaching staff ==
Evansville Rage 2012 staff
Front office: Owner – Melissa Logsdon; General Manager – Eddie Cronin; Assistant general manager – Kory White; Director of football operations – Mike Goodpaster; Director of ticket sales – Erin White; Director of Media and Public Relations/Broadcaster – Jared Revlett	Head coach: Head coach – Mike Goodpaster; Offensive coaches: Offensive coordinator – Tom Johnston; Offensive line – Kory White; Wide receivers – Levron Williams; Quality control – Jermaine Finger; Defensive coaches: Defensive coordinator – Eddie Cronin; Defensive line – J.R. Bryant; Linebackers/secondary – Brian Ware
