= 2012 Dayton Silverbacks season =

- General manager: April Shellenberger
- Head coach: James Scott
- Home stadium: Hara Arena

Results
- Record: 8-1
- Division place: 2nd
- Playoffs: Lost CIFL Championship Game (Sting) 7-35

Uniform
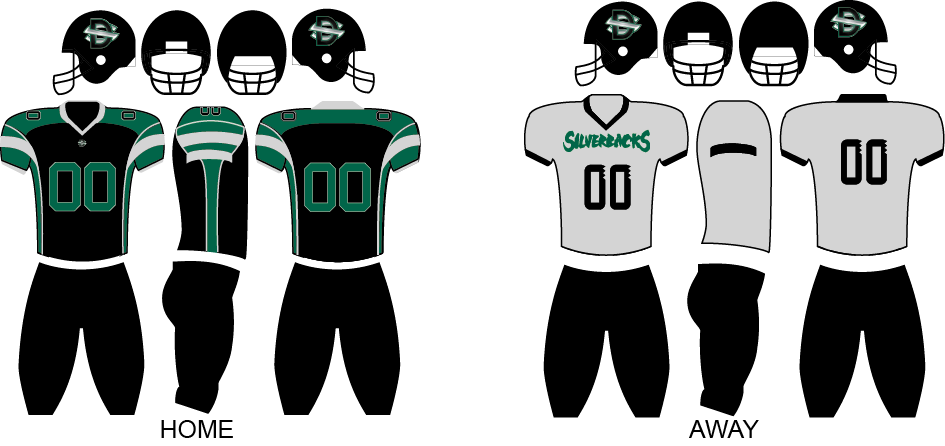

The 2012 Dayton Silverbacks season is the seventh season for the Continental Indoor Football League (CIFL) franchise.

After much speculation about whether or not the Silverbacks would leave the CIFL and join the Ultimate Indoor Football League, the Silverbacks management made an announcement that they would be staying in the CIFL and helping the league rebuild after losing its top two teams from the 2011 season. Coach Derrick Shepad resigned at the end of the 2011 season. On September 8, 2011, Mister Askew was named the 6th coach in Silverbacks history. On February 9, 2012, it was announced that Silverbacks Football LLC, in which Jeff Kolaczkowski of Dayton acted as president of that organization, decided they would be stepping out of the world of football and selling the team to an ownership group. The Dayton Silverbacks were sold to MRL Sports Entertainment LLC. There are currently three members on the ownership board for MRL Sports Entertainment LLC and all three board members were current members of the Dayton Silverbacks front office staff. Those members were Michael Lause, April Shellenberger and Tyree Fields. On March 1, just ten days before the season started, the Silverback fired Head Coach Mister Askew. The reasons for his termination have yet to be determined. Before the season started, Fields left the team in all capacities, leaving only Lause and Shellenberger. Then after one week of the season, Lause left the team as well for reasons that are unknown. With Shelleberger the lone person in charge, there is doubt that the team will survive past the 2012 season.

The Silverbacks finished with a team record 8 wins (the previous team record was 5) as they finished the season 8-1.

They were defeated by the Saginaw Sting, 7-35, in the 2012 CIFL Championship Game.

== Players ==
=== Free agents ===
Position	Player	2012 team
OL	Jason Barnett	Dayton Silverbacks
OL	Adam Bradley	did not play
WR	Melvin Bryant	Marion Blue Racers
WR	Isaiah Cheatham	did not play
WR	Fred Cromartie	did not play
LB	Thaddeus Crosby	did not play
DL	Josh Davis	did not play
DB	Mychal Davis	Dayton Silverbacks
DB	Donavan Evans	Indianapolis Enforcers
RB	Marcus Fails	Dayton Silverbacks
QB	Jeremy Greenleaf	did not play
K	Jeff Hubbard	Dayton Silverbacks
WR	Victor Jett Jr.	did not play
QB	Bruce Jones	Port Huron Patriots
WR	Marque Jones	did not play
DB	Vitario Jones	Dayton Silverbacks
OL	Trent Marlow	Evansville Rage
OL	Michael Melampy	did not play
DB	Chris Respress	Dayton Silverbacks
RB	Ronald Russell	did not play
DB	Neimiah Simons	did not play
DL	James Spikes	Cincinnati Commandos
QB	Chris Stanford	Dayton Silverbacks
OL	E Starks	did not play
DL	Shaun Stewart	did not play
WR	Daniel Stover	Marion Blue Racers
QB	Jarvis Taylor	did not play
LB	Marcus Young	did not play
OL	Kevin West	did not play
LB	Marcus Young	did not play

=== Final roster ===
2012 Dayton Silverbacks roster
Quarterbacks: 11 Evan Sawyer; 1 Chris Stanford; Running backs: 3 Marcus Fails; Wide receivers: 2 Bruce Peters; 18 Tyler Waller; 80 Antwain Weeden	Offensive linemen: 70 Justin Barnett; 72 Josh Ellison; 99 Kevin West; Defensive linemen: 50 Dolapo Adubifa; 89 Marcos Anderson; 52 [ominic Young	Linebackers: 87 Tyler Penn; 33 Mark Smith Jr.; Defensive backs: 8 Mychal Davis; 10 Viterio Jones; 12 Milton Joyner; 37 Chris Respress; 22 Melvin Thomas; Kickers: 84 Zack VanZant	Injured reserve: currently vacant; Inactive: 7 Drew Fowler LB; 88 Lawrence Green OL; 84 Jeff Hubbard K; 44 Trey Jackson LB; 90 Antwan Pratt DL; Practice squad: currently vacant; rookies in italics Roster updated June 2, 2012; 20 Active, 5 Inactive, 0 PS

== Regular season ==
=== Regular season ===
Week	Date	Kickoff	Opponent	Results		Game site
Week	Date	Kickoff	Opponent	Final score	Team record	Game site
1	March 11	3:00 p.m. EST	Indianapolis Enforcers	W 48-7	1-0	Hara Arena
2	March 17	7:30 p.m. EST	at Port Huron Patriots	W 50-22	2-0	McMorran Arena
3	March 23	7:30 P.M. EST	Chicago Vipers	W 48-13	3-0	Hara Arena
4	March 31	7:30 P.M. EST	Port Huron Patriots	W 32-24	4-0	Hara Arena
5	April 7	7:00 P.M. EST	at Evansville Rage	W 52-41	5-0	Swonder Ice Arena
6	April 14	3:15 P.M. EST	at Indianapolis Enforcers	W 62-15	6-0	The SportZone
7	April 21	7:30 P.M. EST	Chicago Pythons	W 50-21	7-0	Hara Arena
8	April 28	7:30 P.M. EST	Evansville Rage	W 41-34	8-0	Hara Arena
9	May 6	7:30 P.M. EST	Chicago Pythons	Game	Cancelled	Hara Arena
10	May 11	7:00 P.M. EST	Saginaw Sting	L 25-41	8-1	Dow Event Center
11	Bye					

=== Standings ===
2012 Continental Indoor Football League
Team	W	L	T	PCT	PF	PA	PF (Avg.)	PA (Avg.)	STK
x-Saginaw Sting	8	0	0	1.000	482	175	60.3	21.9	W 8
x-Dayton Silverbacks	8	1	0	.889	408	218	45.3	24.2	L 1
Evansville Rage	7	3	0	.700	392	308	39.2	30.8	W 3
Port Huron Patriots	4	6	0	.400	316	319	31.6	31.9	W 1
Indianapolis Enforcers	1	9	0	.100	162	565	16.2	56.5	L 6
Chicago Pythons	0	9	0	.000	207	383	23	42.5	L 9

y - clinched regular-season title

x - clinched playoff spot

=== Week 1: vs Indianapolis Enforcers ===
Week 1: Indianapolis Enforcers at Dayton Silverbacks – Game summary

Quarter	1	2	3	4	Total
Enforcers	7	0	0	0	7
Silverbacks	12	17	6	13	48

at Hara Arena, Dayton, Ohio

- Date: March 11, 2012
- Game time: 3:00 p.m. EDT
- Referee: Tommy Tyks

Game information

1st quarter

- Dayton – (12:41) Marcus Fails 7-yard run (Jeff Hubbard kick failed), Dayton 6–0
- Dayton – (1:48) Bruce Peters 4-yard run (Jeff Hubbard kick blocked), Dayton 12–0
- Indianapolis – (0:55) Jamie Barnes 23-yard pass from Anthony Duckett (Pavel Polochanin kick), Dayton 12–7

2nd quarter

- Dayton – (8:11) Evan Sawyer 1-yard run (Jeff Hubbard kick), Dayton 19–7
- Dayton – (5:18) Safety Trey Jackson, Dayton 21–7
- Dayton – (4:07) Evan Sawyer 24-yard run (Bruce Peters rush), Dayton 29–7

3rd quarter

- Dayton – (6:21) Evan Sawyer 1-yard run (Jeff Hubbard kick failed), Dayton 35–7

4th quarter

- Dayton – (14:44) Evan Sawyer 8-yard run (Jeff Hubbard kick), Dayton 42–7
- Dayton – (1:58) Tyler Waller 11-yard pass from Evan Sawyer (Jeff Hubbard kick failed), Dayton 48–7

Passing

- Indianapolis – Anthony Duckett: 7/21, 75 yards, 1 TD
- Dayton – Evan Sawyer: 9/23, 110 yards, 1 TD

Rushing

- Indianapolis – Eric Veazy: 1 att, 4 yards, 0 TD
- Dayton – Evan Sawyer: 8 att, 49 yards, 4 TD

Receiving

- Indianapolis – Jamie Barnes: 2 rec, 36 yards, 1 TD
- Dayton – Tyler Waller: 6 rec, 66 yards, 1 TD

The first quarter opened with Dayton scoring in the first two minutes into the game on a seven-yard run by Marcus Fails. The extra point by Jeff Hubbard failed and Dayton led 6–0. With a minute left in the first quarter, Bruce Peters ran in from four yards out and Dayton was up 12-0. The Enforcers scored with 55 seconds left in the quarter when Jamie Barnes caught a 23-yard pass from quarterback Anthony Duckett. The PAT was good by Pavel Polochanin.

Dayton continued with a second quarter. Halfway through the quarter, Evan Sawyer scored on a 1-yard run. Jeff Hubbard added the PAT and Dayton led 19-7. With 5:18 to play in the half, Trey Jackson recorded a safety and the Silverbacks were up 21-7. The first-half scoring closed with 4:07 remaining on Sawyer's 23-yard run. Peters ran in for the two-point conversion and Dayton led 29-7 at halftime.

The second half belonged to the Silverbacks as well. Dayton scored six points in the third to lead 35-7 after three and added two more scores in the fourth to win going away 48-7. Sawyer had a memorable CIFL debut as he recorded 5 touchdowns (4 rushing and one passing). Duckett on the other had one to forget, as he set an Enforcers, and CIFL, record with 7 interceptions. The 7 interceptions by the Silverbacks set a CIFL record for a single game. The previous record had been 6, held by the Cincinnati Commandos who set the mark in 2011 against Indianapolis.

=== Week 2: vs Port Huron Patriots ===
Week 2: Dayton Silverbacks at Port Huron Patriots – Game summary

Quarter	1	2	3	4	Total
Silverbacks	14	16	6	14	50
Patriots	8	6	8	0	22

at McMorran Arena, Port Huron, Michigan

- Date: March 17, 2012
- Game time: 7:30 p.m. EDT
- Game attendance: 824
- Referee: Dave Stein

Game information

1st quarter

- Dayton – (8:09) Evan Sawyer 1-yard run (Zack VanZant kick), Dayton 7–0
- Port Huron – (5:52) Tracey McIntyre 4-yard run (Mark Carter rush), Port Huron 8–7
- Dayton – (1:47) Bruce Peters 7-yard pass from Evan Sawyer (Zack VanZant kick), Dayton 14–8

2nd quarter

- Dayton – (9:59) Zack VanZant 16-yard field goal, Dayton 17–8
- Dayton – (5:45) Antwain Weeden 25-yard pass from Evan Sawyer (Zack VanZant kick), Dayton 24–8
- Port Huron – (0:56) Terry Mitchell 6-yard pass from Michael McKinley (Carson Nowakowski kick failed), Dayton 24–14
- Dayton - (0:38) Antwain Weeden 52-yard kickoff return (Zack VanZant kick failed), Dayton 30-14

3rd quarter

- Port Huron – (7:30) Jose Morris 14-yard pass from Darryl Johnson (Darryl Johnson pass), Dayton 30–22
- Dayton – (4:13) Tyler Waller 44-yard pass from Evan Sawyer (Zack VanZant kick blocked), Dayton 36–22

4th quarter

- Dayton – (9:26) Bruce Peters 2-yard run (Zack VanZant kick), Dayton 43–22
- Dayton – (5:41) Marcus Fails 10-yard run (Zack VanZant kick), Dayton 50–22

Passing

- Dayton – Evan Sawyer: 7/16, 96 yards, 3 TD
- Port huron – Darryl Johnson: 10/21, 69 yards, 1 TD

Rushing

- Dayton – Marcus Fails: 3 att, 56 yards, 1 TD
- Port huron – Tracey McIntyre: 10 att, 38 yards, 1 TD

Receiving

- Dayton – Tyler Waller: 3 rec, 58 yards, 1 TD
- Port huron – Jose Morris: 3 rec, 33 yards, 1 TD

Dayton opened the scoring first with Evan Sawyer taking the ball in from 1 yard out. The PAT was kicked by Zack VanZant and the Silverbacks led 7-0. The Patriots came right back down the field and scored on 4-yard run by Tracey McIntyre with 5:52 left in the opening stanza. Mark Carter ran in the two-point conversion and the host led 8-7. Dayton took the next possession and moved down the field and answered the call with touchdown with 1:47 left in the quarter. Sawyer passed the ball to Bruce Peters from seven yards out, and VanZant added the PAT. At the end of the first quarter, Dayton led 14-8.

With 9:59 left in the first half, VanZant kicked a 16-yard field goal. With 5:45 left in the half, Sawyer threw a 25-yard touchdown pass to Antwain Weeden. The extra point was good and they led 24-8. Port Huron answered the bell when Terry Michell caught a 6-yard pass from Michael McKinley, but Carson Nowakowski's kick was no good. Weeden took the ensuing kickoff and ran 52 yards for a touchdown to close the half, but the PAT failed. At halftime, Dayton led 30-14.

Darryl Johnson threw a 14-yard pass to Jose Morris to open up the second half scoring. Port Huron went for two points and failed. Dayton then came back and scored with 4 minutes left in the quarter when Sawyer threw a 44 yards pass to Tyler Waller. The third quarter ended and the Silverbacks led 36-22.

In the fourth quarter, Dayton added two touchdowns to close out the scoring and win the game 50-22.

With the win, the Silverbacks improved to 2-0.

=== Week 3: vs Chicago Vipers ===
Week 3: Chicago Vipers at Dayton Silverbacks – Game summary

Quarter	1	2	3	4	Total
Vipers	0	6	7	0	13
Silverbacks	8	13	13	14	48

at Hara Arena, Dayton, Ohio

- Date: March 23, 2012
- Game time: 7:30 p.m. EDT
- Referee: Tim McGuire

Game information

1st quarter

- Dayton – (10:05) Tyler Waller 26-yard pass from Evan Sawyer (Zack VanZant kick blocked), Dayton 6–0
- Dayton – (7:56) Drew Fowler safety, Dayton 8–0

2nd quarter

- Dayton – (8:58) Evan Sawyer 6-yard run (Zack VanZant kick), Dayton 15–0
- Chicago – (0:52) Dan Carter 23-yard pass from Anthony Kropp (Julie Harshbarger kick failed), Dayton 15–6
- Dayton - (0:13) Bruce Peters 6-yard pass from Evan Sawyer (Zack VanZant kick failed), Dayton 21-6

3rd quarter

- Dayton – (9:05) Evan Sawyer 8-yard run (Zack VanZant kick failed), Dayton 27–6
- Chicago – (4:49) Dan Carter 7-yard pass from Anthony Kropp (Julie Harshbarger kick), Dayton 27–13
- Dayton – (1:19) Evan Sawyer 1-yard pass run (Zack VanZant kick), Dayton 34–13

4th quarter

- Dayton – (1:33) Lawrence Green 4-yard pass from Chris Stanford (Zack VanZant kick), Dayton 41–13
- Dayton – (0:19) Marcus Fails 25-yard interception return (Zack VanZant kick), Dayton 48–13

Passing

- Chicago – Anthony Kropp: 13/26, 170 yards, 2 TD
- Dayton – Evan Sawyer: 9/16, 93 yards, 2 TD

Rushing

- Chicago – Khyree Copeland: 9 att, 17 yards, 0 TD
- Dayton – Bruce Peters: 12 att, 78 yards, 0 TD

Receiving

- Chicago – Dan Carter: 5 rec, 85 yards, 2 TD
- Dayton – Tyler Waller: 3 rec, 44 yards, 1 TD

In the first quarter Sawyer hit a wide open Tyler Waller on a 26-yard pass play and it was quickly 6-0 the extra point was blocked. After a safety it was 8 - 0 Dayton after the first quarter.

In the 2nd quarter after Chicago kicker Julie Harshbarger missed a 27-yard field goal Evan sawyer capped off an eight play drive, with a six-yard run and with the extra point made it 15 - 0 Silverbacks, but the Vipers came right back and scored with less than a minute to go in the first half, Anthony Kropp connected with Dan Carter, who made a great one handed catch in the end zone and it was 15-6 Silverbacks. Just seconds later the Silverbacks would answer with a six-yard pass from Evan Sawyer to Bruce Peters and it was 21-6 at the half.

After the Silverback defense stopped the Vipers at their own 14, just two plays later Evan sawyer scored on an eight-yard run and a Zach VanZant extra point made it a 27-6 Dayton lead. Chicago came back with a score of their own on an Anthony Kropp nine-yard pass to Dan Carter, the extra point was good and it was 27 - 13 Dayton. Dayton would put it away after Sawyer scampered in on a one-yard run with 1:19 left in the third quarter and it was 34-13 Silverbacks after the 3rd quarter.

In the final quarter, Dayton's Chris Stanford hit Lawrence Green on a four-yard pass and Marcus Fails intercepted a pass and ran it in from 25 yards out and it was a 48-13.

With the win, the Silverbacks improved to 3-0.

=== Week 4: vs Port Huron Patriots ===
Week 4: Port Huron Patriots at Dayton Silverbacks – Game summary

Quarter	1	2	3	4	Total
Patriots	3	7	7	7	24
Silverbacks	0	19	7	6	32

at Hara Arena, Dayton, Ohio

- Date: March 30, 2012
- Game time: 7:30 p.m. EDT
- Referee: Tommy Tyks

Game information

1st quarter

- Port Huron (4:24) Chris Kolias 34-yard field goal, Port Huron 3-0

2nd quarter

- Dayton (12:14) Evan Sawyer 2-yard run (Zack VanZant kick), Dayton 7-3
- Dayton (0:51) Bruce Peters 4-yard pass from Evan Sawyer (Zack VanZant kick failed), Dayton 13-3
- Port Huron (0:38) Jose' Cannon 30-yard pass from Torrance Webster (Chris Kolias kick), Dayton 13-10
- Dayton (0:26) Bruce Peters 25-yard pass from Evan Sawyer (Zack VanZant kick failed), Dayton 19-10

3rd quarter

- Port Huron (11:27) Mark Carter 1-yard run (Chris Kolias kick), Dayton 19-17
- Dayton (5:04) Bruce Peters 4-yard run (Zack VanZant kick), Dayton 26-17

4th quarter

- Dayton (6:10) Melvin Thomas 40-yard interception return (Zack VanZant kick failed), Dayton 32-17
- Port Huron (0:06) Jose' Cannon 23-yard pass from Torrance Webster (Chris Kolias kick), Dayton 32-24

Passing

- Port huron – Torrance Webster: 9/26, 110 yards, 2 TD
- Dayton – Evan Sawyer: 13/20, 119 yards, 2 TD

Rushing

- Port huron – Torrance Webster: 6 att, 38 yards, 0 TD
- Dayton – Evan Sawyer: 4 att, 11 yards, 1 TD

Receiving

- Port huron – Jose' Cannon: 3 rec, 68 yards, 2 TD
- Dayton – Bruce Peters: 5 rec, 59 yards, 2 TD

After the Port Huron Patriots saw their entire coaching staff, quarterback and a kicker change, the Patriots went on the road for their first road game in franchise history against the undefeated Silverbacks. New Patriot quarterback Torrance Webster threw a pair of touchdowns to Jose' Cannon, and ran in another score. New Patriot kicker Chris Kolias was 1 for 2 on field goal attempts, and 3 for 3 in extra point attempts. In the end, it was Webster's three interceptions that cost the Patriots the game, as the final one was taken back 40 yards by Melvin Thomas to ultimately seal the win for the Silverbacks. Evan Sawyer continued his good play contributing 3 touchdowns, two passing and running another score in.

With the win, the Silverbacks improved to 4-0.

== Coaching staff ==
Dayton Silverbacks staff
Front office: President/General Manager - April Shellenberger; Director of Football Operations - Michael Kiraly; Assistant Director of Football Operations - Bill Nelson; Director of Information Technology - David Brewer; Community Relations - Derrick Shepard; Head coach: Head coach – James Scott; Offensive coaches: Offensive Coordinator –; Running Backs/Wide Receivers -; Offensive Line –	Defensive coaches: Defensive line/defensive coordinator – Derrick Shepard; Linebackers – Shane English; Secondary –
