= Indianapolis Enforcers =

Indoor football team

Logo

General information
- Founded: 2010
- Headquartered: The Farmers Bank Fieldhouse in Lebanon, Indiana
- Colors: Royal blue, light blue, white
- Mascot: Sgt. Doug E. Dog
- IndyEnforcers.com

Personnel
- Owner: K. C. Carter
- General manager: Sharon L. Bingham
- President: K. C. Carter

Team history
- Indianapolis Enforcers (2011–2012; 2018–2021; 2023-present)

Home fields
- The SportZone (2012); The Gathering Place (2018); Off The Wall Sports (2019, 2021); Mojo Up Sports Complex (2023-2024); The Farmers Bank Fieldhouse (2025-present)

League / conference affiliations
- Continental Indoor Football League (2011–2012); Midwest Professional Indoor Football (2018); American Arena League (2019–2021); Midwest Division (2019–2021); Midwest Arena Football League (2023-2024); United Indoor Football Association (2024-2025); United States Arena Football (2025-present)

Championships
- League championships: 1 MAFL: 2023; USAL: 2025

The Indianapolis Enforcers are a professional indoor football team based in Noblesville, Indiana. The team was originally a member of the Continental Indoor Football League (CIFL) and played in Indianapolis. The Enforcers joined the CIFL in 2011 as an expansion team. The Enforcers were the second indoor football team to be based in Indianapolis, the first being the Indiana Firebirds of the original Arena Football League from 2001 to 2004. The founder and owner of the Enforcers is K.C. Carter. The Enforcers played their home games at The SportZone in Indianapolis after playing the 2011 season as a travel team.

In 2018, the team was relaunched as a member of the regional Midwest Professional Indoor Football (MPIF), a developmental indoor league. In 2019, the MPIF and the American Arena League (AAL) agreed to an affiliation and some MPIF teams moved up to the AAL Midwest Division. The first teams in the division were the Enforcers, West Michigan Ironmen, and Chicago Aztecs. The team has participated in several leagues since 2019 and played at Mojo Up Sports Complex in Noblesville from 2023 to 2024 and have played at The Farmers Bank Fieldhouse in Lebanon since 2025.

== Franchise history ==
=== 2011–2012 ===
Original logo from 2011–2017

The Enforcers came into existence when Carter, the owner of the Mid-States Football League's Indianapolis Stampede, put together an expansion franchise to compete in the CIFL. Having been involved with football as a player, owner, head coach, or league commissioner for over 35 years, Carter wanted to take on the challenge of the indoor football game. He put his team together in just 32 days, acquiring players with the understanding that there would be no pay that year. He did not want to be a team that promised the world and delivered nothing. This team was assembled by invitation only. He found his talent in his semi-pro team, The Stampede, and Team USA. He also recruited a few players from Central State University and from the defunct Fort Wayne FireHawks.

Because they joined the CIFL so late, they had no lease to play games in a home arena. This caused the Enforcers to play on the road in 2011, with the hopes of finding a permanent home in 2012. Carter had aspirations that Conseco Field House or the Pepsi Coliseum would be the home for the Enforcers in 2012. On February 26, 2011, the Enforcers lost their first game by a score of 69–12 to the Port Huron Predators. On March 19, 2011, the Enforcers gave up a Cincinnati Commandos record eight touchdown passes to Tyler Sheehan. On April 2, 2011, the Enforcers again became a part of CIFL history, as they gave up a record eight rushing touchdowns in a single game in a 78–0 defeat by the Marion Blue Racers. The Enforcers lone victory in its expansion season was a 2–0 forfeit win over the Predators as they failed to finish the season. They finished the season 1–9 and 6th overall.

For the 2012 season, the Enforcers began playing their home games at the SportZone in Indianapolis. The team removed defensive coordinator Tiny Lee and replaced him with Brian Hendricks, who would also serve as the wide receivers coach. The team also announced the signing of CIFL veteran quarterback Ron Ricciardi to help lead the offense. Ricciardi brought instant stability to the offense, throwing five touchdowns in his first game coming off the bench. Those five touchdowns were more than any Enforcers quarterback had thrown all season in 2011. On March 31, 2012, the Enforcers hosted their first ever home game, and defeated the Chicago Vipers 40–34 for their first ever franchise victory in a played game. After defeating Chicago, Ricciardi sustained a season-ending injury. The Enforcers struggled to score the rest of the season, and did not win another game. They finished with a 1–9 record, which placed the team in 5th place out of six teams.

=== 2018–2021 ===
In 2018, Carter relaunched the Enforcers as members of the regional developmental Midwest Professional Indoor Football (MPIF). Following the season, the MPIF was merged into the American Arena League (AAL) as its Midwest Division, with the Enforcers and 2018 MPIF champions West Michigan Ironmen joining the AAL for 2019. The Enforcers played their home games in Off The Wall Sports, an indoor soccer complex in nearby Carmel, Indiana. By the end of the season, the Enforcers and Ironmen were the only remaining Midwest Division teams still in the AAL, thereby qualifying for the playoffs and losing to the Ironmen 71–0.

For the 2020 season, the team announced it would be moving home games to the Indiana Farmers Coliseum in Indianapolis. However, the season was cancelled before it could begin due to the onset of the COVID-19 pandemic closing arenas. The team planned to return to the Coliseum for the 2021 season, but with the ongoing effects of the pandemic, moved back to Off The Wall Sports. On January 12, 2022, the team initially announced that it had ceased operations permanently. However, it turned out they were only on hiatus for 2022.

=== 2023–present ===
The Enforcers returned to the field in 2023 at their new home at the Mojo Up Sports Complex in Noblesville, Indiana. They captured the Midwest Arena Football League championship in their first season back, defeating the Ohio Blitz 52–2. It was announced via the MAFL's social media that the Enforcers and the league were cutting ties after the 2024 season. The team was once again looking for a new league for 2025 and beyond. They later joined the United Indoor Football Association, a fall indoor league, for 2024. After the fall 2024 season, owner K.C. Carter also created his own league, the United States Arena League, for the fall of 2025. They also announced they will play their home games at The Farmers Bank Fieldhouse in Lebanon, Indiana. The Enforcers won the inaugural World Bowl championship game at home defeating the Ohio Boom 44–35 to capture the second championship title in franchise history.

== Logos and uniforms ==
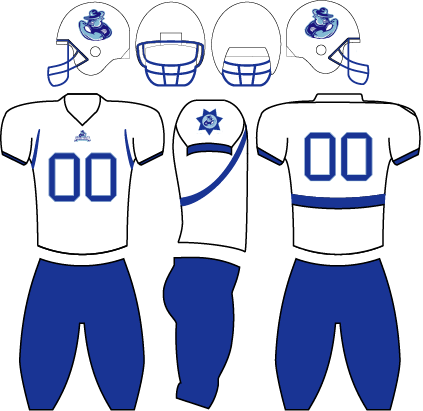
2011 Uniforms

The team's logo was introduced in January 2011 when the team announced that they would be start playing that year. Their logo featured a bulldog in a police uniform, with a patch symbolizing the rank of a sergeant, holding a football in a single arm above a line reading "Enforcers" with "Indianapolis" below that on a ribbon. The team's primary uniform colors were royal blue and white. The Enforcers' helmet was white with a bulldog holding a football on both ends with a single arm. The team wore blue pants and white jerseys for the entire 2011 season. For the 2012 season, the team introduced white pants with a blue stripe on the sides, as well as a blue home jersey.

Starting in 2018, the team donned light blue helmets with white face masks and light blue uniforms.

== Players and personnel ==
=== Awards and honors ===
The following is a list of all Indianapolis Enforcers players who were named to the CIFL Player of the Week on either offense, defense, or special teams.

Season	Player	Position	Week
2011	JaMarcus Walters	Special Teams	12
2011	JaMarcus Walters	Special Teams	13

=== Coaches ===
Name	Term	Regular season				Playoffs		Awards
Name	Term	W	L	T	Win%	W	L	Awards
K.C. Carter	2011–2012	2	18	0	.100	0	0	

== Season-by-season results ==
League champions	Conference champions	Division champions	Playoff berth	League leader

Season	Team	League	Division	Regular season				Postseason results
Season	Team	League	Division	Finish	Wins	Losses	Ties	Postseason results
2011	2011	CIFL		6th	1	9	0	Did not qualify
2012	2012	CIFL		5th	1	9	0	Did not qualify
2018	2018	MPIF		2nd	3	4	0	Lost in playoffs
2019	2019	AAL	Midwest	2nd (Note: The AAL counted all games played by member teams, including games against non-league members, and forfeits in the league standings for the 2019 season.)	3	3	0	Lost division final, 0–71 (West Michigan) (Note: Top two teams from each division qualified for the playoffs. As there were only two teams in the Midwest, the Enforcers advanced.)
2020	2020	AAL		Season cancelled due to COVID-19 pandemic				
2021	2021	AAL		2nd	4	1	0	Lost in playoffs
2022	2022	NAFL		1st	6	0	0	Won championship
2023–2024	2023-2024	Independent		1st	4	1	0	Won I-70 Bowl Championship over Ohio Blitz 52–2
2024–2025	2024-2025	MIFL/UIFL		2nd, MIFL	5	1	0	UIFL record was 0–2; Lost I-70 Bowl Championship to Ohio Elite 30–24, overall record: 5–5
Totals					27	30	0	All-time known regular season record (2011–2012, 2019, 2021–present)
Totals					2	4	—	All-time known postseason record (2011–2012, 2019, 2021–present)
Totals					29	34	0	All-time known regular season and postseason record (2011–2012, 2019, 2021–present)

== See also ==
- The Forum at Fishers
