= 2012 Saginaw Sting season =

- General manager: Robert Licht
- Head coach: Fred Townsend
- Home stadium: Dow Event Center

Results
- Record: 8-0
- League place: 1st
- Playoffs: Won CIFL Championship Game (Silverbacks) 35-7
- Team MVP: Tommy Jones

The 2012 Saginaw Sting season is the fourth season for the Continental Indoor Football League (CIFL) franchise.

On November 11, 2011, Esposito sold his rights to operate the team to Schweigert, Rob Licht and Jim O'Brien. The new ownership announced the same day that they would be moving the team back to the CIFL. On December 29, 2011, the Sting announced that 2011 interim head coach Vince Leveille would return as the full-time head coach for the 2012 season, but just 11 days before the team's first game, Leveille stepped down as the head coach, citing that his full-time job made him unavailable to do both. Defensive Coordinator Fred Townsend took over as the team's head coach.

With an 8–0 record, the Sting returned to the CIFL playoffs for the first time since 2008, when they won the 2008 CIFL Championship Game and finished the season as the Atlantic Conference's #2 seed.

In the 2012 CIFL Championship Game, the Sting defeated the Dayton Silverbacks 35-7, to win the CIFL championship. The title for the Sting was their third in the last four seasons of playing.

== Players ==
=== Free agents ===
Position	Player	2012 team
WR	Andrew Beaver	Saginaw Sting
OL	Eric Brim	Saginaw Sting
DB	Calvin Brown	did not play
DL	Vernon Burden	Saginaw Sting
DL	Michael Carter	Saginaw Sting
WR	Chuck Dowdell	Bloomington Edge
RB	Robert Haynes	did not play
LB	James Herring	did not play
DL	Shawn Horetski	did not play
LB	John Jacobs	Saginaw Sting
QB	Tommy Jones	Saginaw Sting
K	Chris Kolias	Marion Blue Racers
DB	Ed Loscalzo	did not play
WR	Yvens Louis	Chicago Vipers
WR	LaVaughn Macon	Wyoming Cavalry
DL	Mike McFadden	did not play
DL	Mike McGowan	did not play
OL	Steve Milalak	did not play
WR	Zac Nichols	Saginaw Sting
DB	Tony Norman	did not play
OL	Josh Pack	Saginaw Sting
DB	Shawn Richardson	Saginaw Sting
LB	Phillip Smith	did not play
DB	Jaa Valentine	Marion Blue Racers

=== Final roster ===
2012 Saginaw Sting roster
Quarterbacks: 9 Dave Abberger; 4 Tommy Jones; Running backs: 33 Keath Bartynski; Wide receivers: 8 Jeff Austin; 11 Andrew Beaver; 15 Zac Nichols; 1 C. J. Tarver	Offensive linemen: 64 Eric Brim; 52 Robert Cross; 69 Jordan Derosia; 66 Josh Pack; Defensive linemen: 57 Jakendall Brown; 55 Vernon Burden; 99 Michael Carter; 3 Dwight Hargrove; 93 Jonathan Horton; 96 Scott Long	Linebackers: 6 Andrew Deweerd; 37 Anwar Jackson; 34 John Jacobs; Defensive backs: 13 DeMarcus Copes; 5 Jamaal Hibler; 2 Jamar Hibler; 27 Cortez Rice; Kickers: 7 Daniel Evans]	Injured reserve: 7 Patrick Sijan K (IR); Exempt list: currently vacant; Practice squad: 37 Rodney Gallon LB; 3 Ryan Janer WR; 24 Marcus McGhee DB; 96 Charles Moten DL; 13 Shawn Richardson DB; rookies in italics updated April 13, 2012; 25 Active, 1 Inactive, 5 PS

== Regular season ==
=== Schedule ===
Week	Date	Kickoff	Opponent	Results		Game site
Week	Date	Kickoff	Opponent	Final score	Team record	Game site
1	Bye					
2	March 18	7:30 P.M. EST	Chicago Vipers	W 64-32	1-0	Dow Event Center
3	March 25	7:30 P.M. EST	Indianapolis Enforcers	W 91-18	2-0	Dow Event Center
4	March 30	7:30 P.M. EST	Evansville Rage	W 72-29	3-0	Dow Event Center
5	April 7	7:30 P.M. EST	at Chicago Pythons	Cancelled		The Megaplex
6	April 14	7:30 P.M. EST	at Port Huron Patriots	W 49-35	4-0	McMorran Arena
7	April 20	7:30 P.M. EST	Port Huron Patriots	W 42-20	5-0	Dow Event Center
8	April 27	7:30 P.M. EST	Chicago Pythons	W 61-16	6-0	Dow Event Center
9	May 5	7:30 P.M. EST	Indianapolis Enforcers	W 62-0	7-0	Dow Event Center
10	May 11	7:30 P.M. EST	Dayton Silverbacks	W 41-25	8-0	Dow Event Center
11	May 19	7:30 P.M. EST	at Evansville Rage	Cancelled		Swonder Ice Arena

=== Standings ===
2012 Continental Indoor Football League
Team	W	L	T	PCT	PF	PA	PF (Avg.)	PA (Avg.)	STK
x-Saginaw Sting	8	0	0	1.000	482	175	60.3	21.9	W 8
x-Dayton Silverbacks	8	1	0	.889	408	218	45.3	24.2	L 1
Evansville Rage	7	3	0	.700	392	308	39.2	30.8	W 3
Port Huron Patriots	4	6	0	.400	316	319	31.6	31.9	W 1
Indianapolis Enforcers	1	9	0	.100	162	565	16.2	56.5	L 6
Chicago Pythons	0	9	0	.000	207	383	23	42.5	L 9

=== Week 2: vs Chicago Vipers ===
Week 2: Chicago Vipers at Saginaw Sting – Game summary

Quarter	1	2	3	4	Total
Vipers	0	10	14	8	32
Sting	28	12	8	16	64

at Dow Event Center, Saginaw, Michigan

- Date: March 18, 2012
- Game time: 7:30 p.m. EDT

Game information

1st quarter

- Saginaw (14:02) Charles Tarver 45-yard kickoff return (Keith Bartynski rush), Saginaw 8-0
- Saginaw (12:10) Jeff Austin 24-yard interception return (Tommy Jones pass to Jeff Austin), Saginaw 16-0
- Saginaw (6:20) Andrew Beaver 37-yard pass from Tommy Jones (Keith Bartynski rush failed), Saginaw 22-0
- Saginaw (1:15) Andrew Beaver 26-yard pass from Tommy Jones (Tommy Jones pass failed), Saginaw 28-0

2nd quarter

- Chicago (12:20) Anthony Kropp 3-yard run (Julie Harshbarger kick), Saginaw 28-7
- Chicago (2:15) Julie Harshbarger 25-yard field goal, Saginaw 28-10
- Saginaw (0:50) Charles Tarver 5-yard pass from Tommy Jones (Tommy Jones pass failed), Saginaw 34-10
- Saginaw (0:20) Zac Nichols 16-yard pass from Tommy Jones (Tommy Jones pass failed), Saginaw 40-10

3rd quarter

- Chicago (6:39) Khyree Copeland 17-yard pass from Anthony Kropp (Julie Harshbarger kick), Saginaw 40-17
- Saginaw (4:15) Keith Bartynski 1-yard run (Tommy Jones pass to Jeff Austin), Saginaw 48-17
- Chicago (1:49) Ricky Emery 10-yard run (Julie Harshbarger kick), Saginaw 48-24

4th quarter

- Saginaw (7:50) Keith Bartynski 10-yard run (Tommy Jones pass to Charles Tarver), Saginaw 56-24
- Chicago (5:50) Dan Carter 20-yard pass from Anthony Kropp (Bill Ziemba run), Saginaw 56-32
- Saginaw (3:00) Jeff Austin 35-yard pass from Tommy Jones (Tommy Jones pass to Keith Bartynski), Saginaw 64-32

Passing

- Chicago – Anthony Kropp: 19/38, 160 yards, 2 TD
- Saginaw – Tommy Jones: 12/23, 179 yards, 5 TD

Rushing

- Chicago – Khyree Copeland: 4 att, 12 yards, 0 TD
- Saginaw – Keith Bartynski: 8 att, 22 yards, 2 TD

Receiving

- Chicago – Khyree Copeland: 7 rec, 54 yards, 1 TD
- Saginaw – Andrew Beaver: 3 rec, 69 yards, 2 TD

=== Week 3: vs Indianapolis Enforcers ===
Week 3: Indianapolis Enforcers at Saginaw Sting – Game summary

Quarter	1	2	3	4	Total
Enforcers	6	12	0	0	18
Sting	14	39	26	12	91

at Dow Event Center, Saginaw, Michigan

- Date: March 25, 2012
- Game time: 4:30 p.m. EDT

Game information

1st quarter

- Saginaw (10:00) Zac Nichols 20-yard pass from Tommy Jones (Tommy Jones pass failed), Saginaw 6-0
- Indianapolis (6:40) Jamie Barnes 18-yard pass from Ron Ricciardi (Pavel Polochanin kick failed), 6-6
- Saginaw (3:30) Andrew Beaver 12-yard pass from Tommy Jones (Tommy Jones rush), Saginaw 14-6

2nd quarter

- Saginaw (14:30) Andrew Deweerd 40-yard interception return (Keath Bartynski pass from Tommy Jones), Saginaw 22-6
- Indianapolis (10:00) Willie Tolon 16-yard pass from Ron Ricciardi (Ron Ricciardi pass failed), Saginaw 22-12
- Saginaw (6:34) Keath Bartynski 11-yard pass from Tommy Jones (Zac Nichols pass from Tommy Jones), Saginaw 30-12
- Saginaw (2:00) Keath Bartynski 6-yard run (Zac Nichols pass from Tommy Jones), Saginaw 38-12
- Saginaw (0:36) Charles Tarver 17-yard pass from Tommy Jones (Anwar Jackson kick), Saginaw 45-12
- Indianapolis (0:10) James Sharp 3-yard pass from Ron Ricciardi (James Sharp rush failed), Saginaw 45-18
- Saginaw (0:03) Charles Tarver 50-yard kickoff return (Tommy Jones rush), Saginaw 53-18

3rd quarter

- Saginaw (14:48) Charles Tarver 50-yard kickoff return (Keath Bartynski rush failed), Saginaw 59-18
- Saginaw (13:20) John Jacobs fumble recover in the endzone (Anwar Jackson kick), Saginaw 66-18
- Saginaw (7:25) Keath Bartynski 10-yard run (Jonathan Horton kick), Saginaw 73-18
- Saginaw (1:55) Charles Tarver 18-yard pass from Tommy Jones (Anwar Jackson kick failed), Saginaw 79-18

4th quarter

- Saginaw (6:50) Anwar Jackson 2-yard run (Jonathan Horton kick failed), Saginaw 85-18
- Saginaw (2:20) Anwar Jackson 1-yard run (Jonathan Horton kick failed), Saginaw 91-18

Passing

- Indianapolis – Ron Ricciardi: 10/21, 72 yards, 3 TD
- Saginaw – Tommy Jones: 14/15, 190 yards, 5 TD

Rushing

- Indianapolis – Deshaun Holder: 6 att, 28 yards, 0 TD
- Saginaw – Keath Bartynski: 7 att, 51 yards, 2 TD

Receiving

- Indianapolis – James Sharp: 5 rec, 29 yards, 1 TD
- Saginaw – Charles Tarver: 4 rec, 73 yards, 2 TD

The Sting set a CIFL record by scoring 91 points in a single game. The previous high was the Rochester Raiders in a 90-45 win over Lehigh Valley Outlawz on May 7, 2006.

=== Week 4: vs Evansville Rage ===
Week 4: Evansville Rage at Saginaw Sting – Game summary

Quarter	1	2	3	4	Total
Rage	14	7	0	8	29
Sting	16	22	18	16	72

at Dow Event Center, Saginaw, Michigan

- Date: March 30, 2012
- Game time: 7:30 p.m. EDT

Game information

1st quarter

- Saginaw (7:30) Zac Nichols 4-yard pass from Tommy Jones (Tommy Jones rush), Saginaw 8-0
- Evansville (5:00) Nate Samas 3-yard run (Kyle Doughtery kick), Saginaw 8-7
- Saginaw (4:30) Zac Nichols 25-yard pass from Tommy Jones (Tommy Jones pass to Charles Tarver), Saginaw 16-7
- Evansville 1:45) Terrence Wright 23-yard pass from Nate Samas (Kyle Daughtery kick), Saginaw 16-14

2nd quarter

- Saginaw (14:40) Tommy Jones 14-yard run (Kyle Doughtery kick), Saginaw 22-14
- Evansville (13:30) Dusten DeBose 20-yard pass from Nate Samas (Kyle Daughtery kick), Saginaw 22-21
- Saginaw (10:50) Andrew Beaver 13-yard pass from Tommy Jones (Tommy Jones pass to Andrew Beaver), Saginaw 30-21
- Saginaw (3:24) Zac Nichols 22-yard pass from Tommy Jones (Tommy Jones pass to Andrew Beaver), Saginaw 38-21

3rd quarter

- Sagianw (12:14) Keith Bartynski 5-yard run (Tommy Jones pass to Andrew Beaver), Saginaw 46-21
- Sagianw (1:56) Team Safety, Saginaw 48-21
- Sagianw (1:50) Charles Tarver 50-yard kickoff return (Tommy Jones pass to Zac Nichols), Saginaw 56-21

4th quarter

- Saginaw (11:31) Zac Nichols 19-yard pass from Tommy Jones (Keith Bartynski rush), Saginaw 64-21
- Evansville (7:41) Terrence Wright 47-yard run (Nate Samas pass to Joe Casey), Saginaw 64-29
- Saginaw (7:00) Keith Bartynski 13-yard run (Tommy Jones pass to Jeff Austin), Saginaw 72-29

Passing

- Evansville – Nate Samas: 8/24, 82 yards, 2 TD
- Saginaw – Tommy Jones: 15/23, 211 yards, 5 TD

Rushing

- Evansville – Terrence Wright: 5 att, 41 yards, 1 TD
- Saginaw – Tommy Jones: 3 att, 36 yards, 1 TD

Receiving

- Evansville – Dusten DeBose: 3 rec, 44 yards, 1 TD
- Saginaw – Zac Nichols: 8 rec, 162 yards, 4 TD

With the win, the Sting improved to 3-0.

== Coaching staff ==
Saginaw Sting 2012 staff
Front office: Co-owner/general manager – Robert Licht; Co-owner – Stuart Schweigert; Co-owner – James O'Brien; Assistant general manager – Bill Wheeler; Director of gameday operations - Greg Dietrich; Promotions director - Jessica Rondo; Head coach: Head coach/defensive coordinator – Fred Townsend; Offensive coaches: Offensive coordinator – Daniel "SKI" Szatkowski; Wide receivers –; Offensive line – Daniel "SKI" Szatkowski	Defensive coaches: Defensive line – Kevin; Linebackers –; Secondary –
