= Rollergirls of Southern Indiana =

Roller derby league

- Metro area: Evansville, Indiana
- Country: United States
- Founded: August 2007
- Dissolved: September 22, 2012
- Teams: Rollergirls of Southern Indiana
- Track type: Flat
- Venue: Swonder Ice Arena
- Affiliations: WFTDA
- Org. type: Non-profit
- Website: www.rollergirlsofsin.com

The Rollergirls of Southern Indiana was a women's flat-track roller derby league in Evansville, Indiana started by Kristen Wood (Tyranni) and Jesse Wilkins (Gorie DeTails), and was a member in the North Central Region of the Women's Flat Track Derby Association.

The Rollergirls of Southern Indiana had over 30 active skaters and consisted of one interleague travel team that competed with other leagues from around the Midwest and beyond: the Rollergirls of Southern Indiana. The league also had a strong reserve team at one time.

The Rollergirls of Southern Indiana venue was at Swonder Ice Arena in Evansville, Indiana.

The league dissolved on September 22, 2012.

Season	Q4 ranking	Regionals	Championship
2011	26	DNQ	DNQ
