= The Fuel Tank at Fishers =

Sport facility in Indiana

- The Fuel Tank
- Interactive map of The Fuel Tank at Fishers
- Location: 9022 East 126th Street; Fishers, Indiana
- Coordinates: 39.974654°N 86.009304°W
- Owner: Hamilton County
- Surface: Ice

Tenants
- Indianapolis Enforcers (2012); Indy Fuel (Ice Hockey)

The Fuel Tank at Fishers Ice Arena is an arena and recreational sport facility located in Fishers, Indiana. It features two NHL size sheets of ice for hockey, figure skating, and open skating. The Fuel Tank also features a fully equipped Pro Shop.

In 2012, The Fuel Tank, at that time The Forum, was the home of the Indianapolis Enforcers of the Continental Indoor Football League; however, the team ceased operations after the 2012 season.

The Fuel Tank is the practice facility of the Indy Fuel.
