= 2012 Continental Indoor Football League season =

2012 CIFL season
- League: Continental Indoor Football League
- Sport: Indoor Football
- Duration: March 10, 2012 – May 19, 2012

Regular season
- Season champions: Saginaw Sting
- Season MVP: Tommy Jones

2012 CIFL
- Champions: Saginaw Sting
- Runners-up: Dayton Silverbacks
- Finals MVP: Jeff Austin

CIFL seasons
- ← 2011 2013 →

The 2012 Continental Indoor Football League season was the Continental Indoor Football League's seventh overall season. The regular season started on Saturday March 10, with the expansion Port Huron Patriots defeating the expansion Chicago Vipers 52–49 at McMorran Arena, and ended with the 2012 CIFL Championship Game, the league's championship game, on June 2, 2012, at the Dow Event Center in Saginaw, Michigan where the Saginaw Sting defeated the Dayton Silverbacks 35–7.

== Schedule ==
For the first time in the past 3 years, the league's schedule was unbalanced. Teams had been playing each team twice for a total for ten games, but in 2012 some teams will play one team 3 times, and another team just once.

Highlights of the 2012 schedule are a home and home battle for the Michigan Cup between the Patriots and Saginaw Sting. Those games will take place on April 14 in Port Huron and April 20 in Saginaw. The Indianapolis Enforcers and Evansville Rage will have a similar challenge as they meet three times during the season, March 17 and April 21 in Evansville and Mother's Day weekend on May 12 in Indianapolis.

The top four teams were supposed to qualify for the playoffs, which were to begin on the weekend of May 26. The playoff format would have #1 hosting #4 and #2 hosting #3. The 2012 CIFL Championship Game will be held on June 2. The playoffs could start on June 2 if voted on by the owners prior to the season in order to miss Memorial Day weekend. But, the league decided to shorten the playoffs. This left the Port Huron Patriots and the Evansville Rage both out of the playoffs, and Dayton and Saginaw into the CIFL Championship Game

=== Scheduling changes ===
The following regular season games were moved either by way of ownership change:

- Week 5: The Pythons–Sting game was canceled due to the Pythons ownership change midseason. The game was postposted and rescheduled, only to be played if the game would have playoff implications. The game later proved to have no playoff implications.
- Week 11: the Sting-Rage game was canceled due to the Sting already making the playoffs and not wanting to play the game. The Pythons instead chose to play the Rage in Week 11.

== Regular season standings ==
2012 Continental Indoor Football League
Team	W	L	T	PCT	PF	PA	PF (Avg.)	PA (Avg.)	STK
x-Saginaw Sting	8	0	0	1.000	482	175	60.3	21.9	W 8
x-Dayton Silverbacks	8	1	0	.889	408	218	45.3	24.2	L 1
Evansville Rage	7	3	0	.700	392	308	39.2	30.8	W 3
Port Huron Patriots	4	6	0	.400	316	319	31.6	31.9	W 1
Indianapolis Enforcers	1	9	0	.100	162	565	16.2	56.5	L 6
Chicago Pythons	0	9	0	.000	207	383	23	42.5	L 9

y - clinched regular-season title

x - clinched playoff spot

== Playoffs ==
CIFL Championship Game
2	Dayton	7
1	Saginaw	35

== Rule changes ==
There were not major rule changes, but the game ball was changed from the golden color they have used since 2009. The new ball returns to a traditional brown color that can be seen in the NFL, as well as white stripes are painted on each end of the ball, halfway around the circumference, to improve indoor visibility.

== Media ==
The CIFL continues to offer live stats and streaming audio for its games using the Gamecenter on www.CIFLFootball.com, but individual teams are still allowed to contract out their radio and TV broadcasts to local media stations.

The following is a list of media outlets that were used by their respective teams throughout the season:

Team	Station	Type
Dayton Silverbacks	Troy5	TV
Dayton Silverbacks	Wave96	Radio/Internet
Evansville Rage	ESPN Radio 106.7	Radio
Evansville Rage	1590AM WRCY	Radio
Evansville Rage	102.3 WBTO	Radio
Port Huron Patriots	Michigan Regional Sports Network (MRSN)	Internet
Saginaw Sting	MRSN	Internet

== Coaching changes ==
=== Pre-season ===
Team	2012 Coach	2011 Coach(es)	Reason for leaving	Story/Accomplishments
Dayton Silverbacks	Mister Askew/ James Scott	Derrick Shepard	Resigned	Shepard resigned on June 15, 2011. Shepard lead the Silverbacks to a 5-5 record in 2011, the highest single season winning percentage in team history, and lead the team to its second straight playoff appearance. Shepard ranks second on the franchises wins total for a head coach. On September 7, 2011, it was announced that Mister Askew would be named the 6th coach in Silverbacks history. On March 1, just ten days before the season started, the Silverback fired Head Coach Mister Askew. The reasons for his termination have yet to be determined. He was replaced by James Scott, who had been hired as the defensive coordinator.
Saginaw Sting	Jeff Townsend	John Mize/Vince Leveille (Interim)	Fired	On December 29, 2011, the Sting announced that 2011 interim head coach Vince Leveille would return as the full-time head coach for the 2012 season, but just 11 days before the team's first game, Leveille stepped down as the head coach, citing that his full-time job made him unavailable to do both. Defensive Coordinator Fred Townsend took over as the team's head coach. Leveille replaced John Mize, who was dismissed after losing back to back one point games.

=== In-season ===
Team	2012 head coach	Interim head coach	Reason for leaving	Story/Accomplishments
Port Huron Patriots	John Forti	Dave Kinsman	Fired	Forti compiled a 1-2 (.333) record, after just three games. Ownership cited Forti's decision to hire his friends as assistant coaches and not make the best choices for the team as their reason for Forti's termination.

== Records and milestones ==
- Most interceptions in a game by a single team: 7, Dayton (vs. Indianapolis, March 11, 2012)
- Most interceptions thrown in a game by a single player: 7, Anthony Duckett (Indianapolis, March 11, 2012)
- Most points scored in a game by a single team: 91, Saginaw (vs. Indianapolis, March 25, 2012)

=== Awards ===
Award	Winner	Position	Team
CIFL MVP	Tommy Jones	Quarterback	Saginaw Sting
Offensive Player of the Year	Tommy Jones	Quarterback	Saginaw Sting
Defensive Player of the Year	Melvin Thomas	Defensive Back	Dayton Silverbacks
Special Teams Player of the Year	C. J. Tarver	Wide Receiver	Saginaw Sting
Coach of the Year	James Scott	Head coach	Dayton Silverbacks
