= Chicago Pythons =

American indoor football team

Logo

General information
- Founded: 2011
- Folded: 2012
- Headquartered: Homer Glen, Illinois at The Megaplex
- Colors: Orange, Black, White
- ChicagoPythons.com

Personnel
- Owner: Michael Duran
- CEO: Michael Duran
- General manager: Michael Duran
- Head coach: John Hunt
- President: Michael Duran

Team history
- Chicago Vipers (2012, first four games); Chicago Pythons (2012, rest of the season)

Home fields
- The Megaplex (2012)

League / conference affiliations
- Continental Indoor Football League (2012)

The Chicago Pythons were a professional indoor football team based in Homer Glen, Illinois. The team was a member of the Continental Indoor Football League (CIFL). The Pythons joined the CIFL in 2012 as an expansion team under the name "Chicago Vipers". They changed their name to the "Chicago Pythons" four weeks into the season. The Pythons were the third indoor football team based in the Chicago area. The Chicago Rush of the Arena Football League were based in Rosemont, and the Chicago Slaughter of the Indoor Football League are based in Hoffman Estates. The Pythons replaced the Chicago Knights, formerly the Chicago Cardinals, as the Illinois-based CIFL team, which replaced the Slaughter after they left for the Indoor Football League after a dispute with CIFL management. The Owner of the Pythons was Michael Duran. The Pythons were supposed to play their home games at The Megaplex in Homer Glen, Illinois, but the team never hosted a home game.

== Franchise history ==
=== Play begins: 2012 ===
On December 9, 2011 it was announced that the Vipers and the Evansville Rage would become the 5th and 6th expansion teams for the 2012 CIFL season. The Vipers will host only three games for the 2012 season and also have availability to host for the playoffs should they qualify. Michael Duran are looking to bring back a positive image for Chicago CIFL teams as last two have left a bad taste in the fans mouths. The team was originally scheduled to play their home games at the Odeum Expo Center in Villa Park, but later decided to play at the Sports Zone in Melrose Park. In their first ever game, the Vipers lost 52–49 to the Port Huron Patriots, who were also playing their first game. Chicago would have one last chance to tie the game, but Julie Harshbarger's kick was no-good as time expired. Before their week 5 game against the Saginaw Sting, the Vipers changed their nickname to the "Pythons" when the Mike Duran became the sole owner of the team.

=== 2013 ===
There was a release by the Ultimate Indoor Football League that the Pythons had joined their league for 2013, but the league late removed the story from their website and did not comment on its removal.

== Logos and uniforms ==
When trying to think of a nickname to call the team, Former Co-Owner Richard Petroski Jr. was texting back and forth with some family members and friends, when his cousin sent him back the name "Vipers" and it stuck. The team picked their colors while watching Oklahoma State Cowboys play. The team's original logo was introduced in December 2011 when the team announced that they would be playing in 2012. That logo featured a viper's head which merged with a football. To the right of the logo there is the words "Chicago Vipers". The team introduced a new logo in late January, 2012. The new logo removed the football, and changed the text of "Chicago Vipers" to look like that of snake skin. Before their week 5 game against the Saginaw Sting, the Vipers changed their nickname to the "Pythons."

== Coaches of note ==
=== Head coaches ===
Name	Term	Regular season				Playoffs		Awards
Name	Term	W	L	T	Win%	W	L	Awards
Richard Petroski Jr.	2012	0	4	0	.000	0	0	
Richard Guy	2012	0	5	0	.000	0	0	

=== Coaching staff ===
Chicago Pythons staff
Front office: Founder/Owner – Michael Duran; Head coach – John Hunt; Offensive coaches: Offensive coordinator – Steve Rico; Running Backs -; Wide Receivers –; Offensive Line –	Defensive coaches: Defensive Coordinator –; Defensive Line –; Linebackers –; Secondary –

== Season-by-season results ==
League champions	Conference champions	Division champions	Wild card berth	League leader

Season	Team	League	Conference	Division	Regular season				Postseason results
Season	Team	League	Conference	Division	Finish	Wins	Losses	Ties	Postseason results
2012	2012	CIFL			6th	0	9	0	
Totals						0	9	0	All-time regular season record (2012)
Totals						0	0	-	All-time postseason record (2012)
Totals						0	9	0	All-time regular season and postseason record (2012)
