= Owensboro Rage =

Logo

General information
- Founded: 2011
- Folded: 2013
- Headquartered: The Next Level Sports Facility in Owensboro, Kentucky
- Colors: Purple, Black, White
- Mascot: Rage

Personnel
- Owner: Melissa Logsdon
- General manager: James Ratliff
- Head coach: Mike Goodpaster
- President: Melissa Logsdon

Team history
- Evansville Rage (2012); Owensboro Rage (2013)

Home fields
- Swonder Ice Arena (2012); The Next Level Sports Facility (2013)

League / conference affiliations
- Continental Indoor Football League (2012–2013)

The Owensboro Rage, formerly the Evansville Rage, was a professional indoor football team based in Owensboro, Kentucky. The team was a member of the Continental Indoor Football League. The Rage joined the CIFL in 2012 as an expansion team. The Rage were the first indoor football team to be based in Owensboro. The Rage were founded in 2011 by David Reed. Reed stepped down as President and General Manager in March 2012 due to lack of funds. In 2013 the owner of the Rage became Melissa Logsdon. The Rage played their home games at The Next Level Sports Facility.

== Franchise history ==
=== Play begins: 2012 ===
On November 16, 2011, the team announced its intentions to compete as full members of the CIFL for the 2013 season. The Rage also hired their head coach, naming Mike Goodpaster to the position. Goodpaster was most recently the defensive coordinator of the Northern Kentucky River Monsters of the Ultimate Indoor Football League. On December 9, 2011, it was announced that the Rage were going become the final expansion team for the 2012 Continental Indoor Football League season, playing their homes games at Swonder Ice Arena. On March 6, 2012, owner and general manager, David Reed, resigned from his duties due to lack of funds. The same day, the Rage announced Eddie Cronin as the team's General Manager. Cronin had been a part of the organization from the start as the defensive coordinator. He continued to keep his position as defensive coordinator. The Rage went on to a 7–3 season, good enough to finish third in the CIFL, but despite this factor, the league decided to shorten the playoffs. This left the Rage and the Port Huron Patriots both out of the playoffs.

=== 2013 ===
On July 13, 2012, Owner and General Manager Eddie Cronin died in an automobile accident. On August 8, 2012, the Rage confirmed that they would continue to be a part of the CIFL again in 2013, with Cronin's fiancé, Melissa Logsdon, running the team. The season will be dedicated to Cronin. On September 27, 2012, Logsdon announced that the team would be moving to Owensboro, Kentucky. The Rage also named Kory White as General Manager the same day. After starting off 2–0, the Rage lost three straight games. To help the floundering team, the Rage signed University of Kentucky star Jared Lorenzen to help solidify the quarterback position. Lorenzen helped the Rage instantly by helping the Rage win a close game with the Marion Blue Racers. The Rage received two automatic victories from the folding of the Kane County Dawgs, bringing their record to 5–3, but with two games remaining in the season, the Rage suspended operations due to lack of funds. The Rage forfeited their final two games of the season, making their record 5–5.

== Logos and uniforms ==
The team's logo was introduced in November 2011 when the team announced that they would be playing in 2013. Their logo features the word "Rage" with has a lightning bolt styled font, similar to the style that the Orlando Rage of the XFL used. There is also the word Evansville in the upper left-hand corner.

== Season-by-season results ==
League champions	Conference champions	Division champions	Wild card berth	League leader

Season	Team	League	Conference	Division	Regular season				Postseason results
Season	Team	League	Conference	Division	Finish	Wins	Losses	Ties	Postseason results
2012	2012	CIFL			3rd	7	3	0	
2013	2013	CIFL			8th	5	5	0	
Totals						12	8	0	All-time regular season record (2012–2013)
Totals						0	0	-	All-time postseason record (2012–2013)
Totals						12	8	0	All-time regular season and postseason record (2012–2013)

== Head coaches ==
Name	Term	Regular season				Playoffs		Awards
Name	Term	W	L	T	Win%	W	L	Awards
Mike Goodpaster	2012-2013	12	8	0	.600	0	0	

== Notable players ==
See Category:Owensboro Rage players
