= The SportZone =

Multi-sport facility in Indianapolis, Indiana

- Interactive map of The SportZone
- Location: 6601 Coffman Rd. Indianapolis, Indiana 46268
- Coordinates: 39.876165°N 86.239507°W
- Surface: Field Turf
- Field size: Field 1: 120 ft × 120 ft (37 m × 37 m); Field 2: 75 ft × 120 ft (23 m × 37 m); Field 3: 20 ft × 120 ft (6.1 m × 36.6 m); Field 4: 85 ft × 185 ft (26 m × 56 m)

Tenant
- Indianapolis Enforcers (CIFL) (2012)

The SportZone is a multi-sport facility in Indianapolis, Indiana. The facility spans six acres. Their indoor arenas can be used for Baseball, Softball, Basketball, Soccer, Lacrosse, Volleyball and Flag Football. In 2012, the Indianapolis Enforcers, a professional indoor football team, announced The SportZone as their home arena for the 2012 season.

== Facilities ==
The SportZone offers

- 3 regulation-size basketball courts.
- 5 volleyball courts
- Arena-size football field
- Baseball/Softball field
- 8 batting cages
- 3 indoor baseball pitching mounds
- indoor soccer arena
- Weight room and cardio equipment
- Aerobics studio
- Sports bar and snack bar
