= Swonder Ice Arena =

Arena in Evansville, Indiana, US

- Interactive map of Swonder Ice Arena
- Location: Evansville, Indiana
- Coordinates: 37.979263°N 87.519441°W
- Owner: City of Evansville
- Capacity: 1,500 (Ice Hockey)
- Surface: Ice
- Public transit: METS

Construction
- Opened: 2002

Tenants
- Rollergirls of Southern Indiana (WFTDA) (2007–2012); Evansville Rage (CIFL) (2012); Evansville Mariners (USPHL) (2025–present)

Swonder Ice Arena is an arena and recreational sport facility in Evansville, Indiana. It features two NHL size sheets of ice for hockey, figure skating, and open skating. One sheet of ice is open all year. Sound and light, designed with the technology used at the 2002 Olympics, are in use when the skaters skate. Leagues for hockey from beginner to adult also take place year round. On the second level there is a 10,000-square-foot workout facility with a running/walking track.

== History ==
The current Swonder Ice Arena opened in October 2002 and replaced the older Swonder Ice Rink. Current seating capacity for spectators is 1,500 - approximately 1,000 in the primary (west) rink and approximately 500 in the secondary (east) rink.

Swonder was formerly the practice facility of a professional minor league ice hockey team, the Evansville IceMen, which played at the Ford Center while practicing at Swonder. Swonder was also home to the Rollergirls of Southern Indiana from 2007 to 2012 and local high school and youth hockey teams also compete throughout the winter.

In January 2012, the Evansville Rage of the Continental Indoor Football League moved to Swonder due to large ticket requests.

Swonder is also home to the local Indiana State High School Hockey League team, the Evansville Thunder.

In 2010, Swonder formed the first theatre on ice team in Indiana. River City Ice Theatre competed at the 2012 U.S. Figure Skating Theater on Ice National Competition in Strongsville, OH where they received a second place award out of 37 teams for best original theme/story. In 2012, River City Ice Theatre was adopted by the Greater Evansville Figure Skating Club and became a 501(c)3 organization.

== See also ==
- Sports in Evansville
