= 2010 Marion Mayhem season =

- Owner: Dawn Redman; Andre Smith
- General manager: LaMonte Coleman
- Head coach: Reginald Jones
- Home stadium: Veterans Memorial Coliseum; 220 East Fairground Street; Marion, OH 43302

Results
- Record: 3–7
- League place: 5th
- Playoffs: did not qualify

The 2010 Marion Mayhem season was the fifth season for the Continental Indoor Football League (CIFL) franchise, and the team's last season, as they would fail to be able to finish the season, and forfeit their last 4 games of the 2010 season. On December 24, 2009, team announced their intentions to move the Mayhem franchise to Columbus, Ohio and become the Columbus Aces before the season, citing a lack of attendance as the reason for the move. The move fell through, and the team played the 2010 season in Marion. After starting the season 3-3, the Mayhem folded, rewarding the teams that had yet to play them with victories.

== Standings ==
2010 Continental Indoor Football League
Team	W	L	T	PCT	PF	PA	PF (Avg.)	PA (Avg.)	STK
Cincinnati Commandos-y	9	1	0	.900	493	294	49.3	29.4	L1
Wisconsin Wolfpack-x	8	2	0	.800	345	213	34.5	21.3	W3
Fort Wayne FireHawks-x	6	4	0	.600	294	267	36.75	33.375	W2
Miami Valley Silverbacks-x	4	6	0	.400	309	354	34.33	39.33	W1
Marion Mayhem	3	7	0	.300	202	193	33.67	32.16	L5
Chicago Cardinals	0	10	0	.000	205	525	20.5	52.5	L10

== Schedule ==
Week	Date	Opponent	Home/Away	Result
1		Bye	Week	
2		Bye	Week	
3	March 26	Cincinnati Commandos	Away	L 19-48
4	April 2	Chicago Cardinals	Home	W 60-20
5	April 10	Chicago Cardinals	Away	W 19-14
6		Bye	Week	
7	April 24	Wisconsin Wolfpack	Away	L 34-20
8	May 1	Miami Valley Silverbacks	Home	W 64-39
9	May 8	Cincinnati Commandos	Home	L 38-20
10	May 15	Fort Wayne Firehawks	Home	L Forfeit
11		Bye	Week	
12	May 28	Fort Wayne Firehawks	Away	L Forfeit
13	June 5	Wisconsin Wolfpack	Home	L Forfeit
14	June 12	Miami Valley Silverbacks	Home	L Forfeit

== Roster ==
2010 Marion Mayhem roster
Quarterbacks: 1 Josh Davis; Offensive backs: 8 Maurice Douse; 7 Victor Tolbert; Receivers: 9 Marcus Fails; 11 Marc Huddleston; 15 Mike Tatum; 86 Brandon Price	Offensive linemen: 30 C Hall; 90 J. T. Haynes; 86 Brandon Price; 75 Derek Weaver; Defensive linemen: 27 Mike Cross; 10 Don Germany; 82 Curtis McGhee; 4 Thomas McKenzie	Linebackers: 42 James Wells; Defensive backs: 3 Walter Dudley; 6 Ahmona Maxwell; 23 Brian Robinson; 2 Andre Troy; 14 Bryan Williams; Kickers: 28 John Sims	Inactive: currently vacant; Injured reserve: currently vacant; Updated May 8, 2010 rookies in italics 22 Active, 0 Inactive

== Stats ==
=== Passing ===
Player	Comp.	Att.	Comp%	Yards	TD's	INT's	Rating
Josh Davis	71	147	48.3%	707	10	8	94.4
Ahmona Maxwell	0	1	0%	0	0	0	39.6

=== Rushing ===
Player	Car.	Yards	Avg.	TD's	Long
Josh Davis	42	249	5.9	3	24
Victor Tolbert	31	151	4.9	9	42
Maurice Douse	10	40	4	1	9
Ahmona Maxwell	1	4	4	0	4

=== Receiving ===
Player	Rec.	Yards	Avg.	TD's	Long
Mike Tatum	20	243	12.1	4	35
Maurice Douse	16	222	13.9	3	30
Victor Tolbert	15	95	6.3	2	15
K Hampton	9	80	8.9	0	16

== Regular season ==
=== Week 3: vs Cincinnati Commandos ===
Week 3: Marion Mayhem at Cincinnati Commandos – Game summary

Quarter	1	2	3	4	Total
Mayhem	0	9	10	0	19
Commandos	7	15	13	13	48

at Cincinnati Gardens, Cincinnati, Ohio

- Date: March 26
- Game time: 7:00 p.m. EDT
- Game attendance: 3,272

Game information

1st quarter

- Cincinnati – (8:28) Ben Mauk 11-yard rush (Travis Johnson kick), Cincinnati 7–0

2nd quarter

- Cincinnati - (14:21) Dominick Goodman 6-yard pass from Ben Mauk (Brandon Boehm rush), Cincinnati 15-0
- Cincinnati - (8:38) Robert Redd 10-yard pass from Ben Mauk (Travis Johnson kick), Cincinnati 22-0
- Marion – (3:05) Eric Schnatz 25-yard field goal, Cincinnati 22–3
- Marion – (0:00) Josh Davis 1-yard rush (Erick Schnatz kick failed), Cincinnati 22–9

3rd quarter

- Marion – (11:33) Josh Davis 11-yard rush (Erick Schnatz kick), Cincinnati 22–16
- Cincinnati - (9:05) Dominick Goodman 3-yard pass from Ben Mauk (Travis Johnson kick), Cincinnati 29-16
- Marion – (4:49) Eric Schnatz 21-yard field goal, Cincinnati 29-19
- Cincinnati - (2:22) Brandon Boehm 25-yard pass from Ben Mauk (Travis Johnson rush failed), Cincinnati 35-19

4th quarter

- Cincinnati - (8:07) Greg Moore 4-yard rush (Travis Johnson kick), Cincinnati 42-19
- Cincinnati - (0:25) Jesse Wendt 42-yard pass from Ben Mauk (Travis Johnson kick failed), Cincinnati 48-19

Passing

- Marion – Josh Davis: 11/27, 130 yards, 0 TD
- Cincinnati – Ben Mauk: 14/21, 192 yards, 5 TD

Rushing

- Marion – Josh Davis: 13 att, 90 yards, 2 TD
- Cincinnati – Greg Moore: 10 att, 44 yards, 1 TD

Receiving

- Marion – Mike Tatum: 4 rec, 42 yards, 0 TD
- Cincinnati – Dominick Goodman: 5 rec, 52 yards, 2 TD

=== Week 4: vs. Chicago Cardinals ===
Week 4: Chicago Cardinals at Marion Mayhem – Game summary

Quarter	1	2	3	4	Total
Cardinals	13	7	0	0	20
Mayhem	14	13	14	19	60

at Veterans Memorial Coliseum, Marion, Ohio

- Date: April 2
- Game time: 7:30 p.m. EDT
- Game attendance: 1,241

Game information

1st quarter

- Chicago – (12:01) A Chorazy 6-yard rush (J Brown kick), Chicago 7–0
- Marion – (5:45) Victor Tolbert 1-yard rush (Eric Schnatz kick), 7–7
- Chicago – (3:40) Alex Nunez 20-yard pass from Ron Ricciardi (J Brown kick failed), Chicago 13–7
- Marion – (2:11) Maurice Douse 26-yard pass from Josh Davis (Eric Schnatz kick), Marion 14–13

2nd quarter

- Marion – (10:51) Ahmona Maxwell 6-yard blocked field goal return (Eric Schnatz kick failed), Marion 20–13
- Chicago – (6:09) Alex Nunez 4-yard pass from Ron Ricciardi (J Brown kick), 20–20
- Marion – (0:22) Brandon Price 2-yard pass from Josh Davis (Eric Schnatz kick), Marion 27–20

3rd quarter

- Marion – (10:49) Mike Tatum 4-yard pass from Josh Davis (Eric Schnatz kick), Marion 34–20
- Marion – (2:31) Maurice Douse 11-yard pass from Josh Davis (Eric Schnatz kick), Marion 41–20

4th quarter

- Marion – (11:34) Mike Tatum 25-yard pass from Josh Davis (Eric Schnatz kick failed), Marion 47–20
- Marion – (5:34) Mike Cross 0-yard fumble recovery (Eric Schnatz kick), Marion 54–20
- Marion – (0:09) Victor Tolbert 1-yard rush (Eric Schnatz kick failed), 60–20

Passing

- Chicago – Ron Ricciardi: 13/33, 134 yards, 2 TD
- Marion – Josh Davis: 12/21, 148 yards, 5 TD

Rushing

- Chicago – A Chorazy: 5 att, 16 yards, 1 TD
- Marion – Josh Davis: 4 att, 27 yards, 0 TD

Receiving

- Chicago – M Leaks: 5 rec, 36 yards, 0 TD
- Marion – Maurice Douse: 4 rec, 76 yards, 2 TD

=== Week 5: vs. Chicago Cardinals ===
Week 5: Marion Mayhem at Chicago Cardinals – Game summary

Quarter	1	2	3	4	Total
Mayhem	13	6	0	0	19
Cardinals	0	14	0	0	14

at Odeum Expo Center, Villa Park, Illinois

- Date: April 10
- Game time: 7:30 p.m. CDT

Game information

1st quarter

- Marion – (11:07) Andre Troy 50-yard blocked field goal return (Eric Schnatz kick), Marion 7–0
- Marion – (1:40) Victor Tolbert 3-yard rush (Eric Schnatz kick failed), Marion 13–0

2nd quarter

- Chicago – (14:45) Brandon Wogoman 1-yard rush (Brandon Wogoman rush failed), Marion 13–6
- Chicago – (13:15) Jaran Rutledge safety, Marion 13–8
- Marion – (12:40) Mike Tatum 14-yard pass from Josh Davis (Eric Schnatz kick failed), Marion 19–8
- Chicago – (10:36) Shawn McKeown 19-yard pass from Ron Ricciardi (Shawn McKeown kick failed), Marion 19–14

3rd quarter
4th quarter

Passing

- Marion – Josh Davis: 14/24, 145 yards, 1 TD
- Chicago – Ron Ricciardi: 9/27, 113 yards, 1 TD

Rushing

- Marion – Josh Davis: 8 att, 16 yards, 0 TD
- Chicago – A Chorazy: 2 att, 6 yards, 0 TD

Receiving

- Marion – Victor Tolbert: 4 rec, 28 yards, 0 TD
- Chicago – M Leaks: 3 rec, 21 yards, 0 TD

=== Week 7: vs. Wisconsin Wolfpack ===
Week 7: Marion Mayhem at Wisconsin Wolfpack – Game summary

Quarter	1	2	3	4	Total
Mayhem	7	13	0	0	20
Wolfpack	6	14	8	6	34

at Hartmeyer Arena, Madison, Wisconsin

- Date: April 24
- Game time: 7:30 p.m. CDT

Game information

1st quarter

- Wisconsin – (8:24) Marques Johnson 20-yard pass from Matt Schabert (Tony Smidl kick failed), Wisconsin 6–0
- Marion – (6:14) Mike Tatum 29-yard pass from Josh Davis (John Sims kick), Marion 7–6

2nd quarter

- Marion – (10:11) Maurice Douse 19-yard pass from Josh Davis (John Sims kick blocked), Marion 13–6
- Wisconsin – (4:31) Marcus Lewis 19-yard pass from Matt Schabert (Tony Smidl kick), 13–13
- Marion – (3:55) Mike Tatum 49-yard kickoff return (John Sims kick), Marion 20–13
- Wisconsin – (2:06) Eric Donoval 19-yard rush (Tony Smidl kick), 20-20

3rd quarter

- Wisconsin – (4:05) Eric Donoval 7-yard pass from Matt Schabert (Tony Smidl rush), Wisconsin 28-20

4th quarter

- Wisconsin – (2:09) Eric Donoval 7-yard pass from Matt Schabert (Tony Smidl kick blocked), Wisconsin 34-20

Passing

- Marion – Josh Davis: 12/32, 114 yards, 2 TD
- Wisconsin – Matt Schabert: 12/24, 121 yards, 4 TD

Rushing

- Marion – Josh Davis: 8 att, 45 yards, 0 TD
- Wisconsin – Eric Donoval: 6 att, 40 yards, 1 TD

Receiving

- Marion – Mike Tatum: 5 rec, 57 yards, 1 TD
- Wisconsin – Eric Donoval: 4 rec, 32 yards, 2 TD

=== Week 8: vs. Miami Valley Silverbacks ===
Week 8: Miami Valley Silverbacks at Marion Mayhem – Game summary

Quarter	1	2	3	4	Total
Silverbacks	6	15	0	18	39
Mayhem	13	14	10	27	64

at Veterans Memorial Coliseum, Marion, Ohio

- Date: May 1
- Game time: 7:30 p.m. EDT
- Game attendance: 1,312

Game information

1st quarter

- Marion – (9:04) Victor Tolbert 4-yard pass from Josh Davis (John Sims kick failed), Marion 6–0
- Miami valley – (5:30) Eric Morton 36-yard pass from Kyenes Mincy (Kyenes Mincy rush failed), 6–6
- Marion – (1:49) Victor Tolbert 4-yard rush (John Sims kick), Marion 13–6

2nd quarter

- Miami valley – (11:04) Melvin Bryant 2-yard pass from Kyenes Mincy (Kyenes Mincy rush), Miami Valley 14–13
- Marion – (7:24) Victor Tolbert 2-yard rush (John Sims kick), Marion 20–14
- Marion – (0:57) Victor Tolbert 5-yard pass from Josh Davis (John Sims kick), Marion 27–14
- Miami valley – (0:47) Derrick Moss 53-yard kickoff return (Austin Goss), Marion 27–21

3rd quarter

- Marion – (13:29) Josh Davis 4-yard rush (John Sims kick), Marion 34–21
- Marion – (3:21) John Sims 18-yard field goal, Marion 37–21

4th quarter

- Miami valley – (14:45) Daniel Stover 28-yard pass from Kyenes Mincy (Kyenes Mincy pass failed), Marion 37–27
- Marion – (12:40) Victor Tolbert 17-yard rush (Maurice Douse rush), Marion 45–27
- Miami valley – (10:04) Kyenes Mincy 12-yard rush (Kyenes Mincy pass failed), Marion 45–33
- Marion – (7:48) Maurice Douse 8-yard rush (John Sims kick failed), Marion 51–33
- Marion – (1:26) Victor Tolbert 42-yard rush (John Sims kick failed), Marion 57–33
- Marion – (0:26) Aric Evans 18-yard pass from Kyenes Mincy (Kyenes Mincy rush failed), Marion 57–39
- Marion – (0:21) Brandon Price 3-yard kickoff return (J.T. Haynes kick), Marion 64–39

Passing

- Miami valley – Kyenes Mincy: 7/18, 98 yards, 4 TD
- Marion – Josh Davis: 10/13, 110 yards, 2 TD

Rushing

- Miami valley – Kyenes Mincy: 5 att, 39 yards, 1 TD
- Marion – Victor Tolbert: 11 att, 109 yards, 4 TD

Receiving

- Miami valley – Daniel Stover: 2 rec, 30 yards, 1 TD
- Marion – Mark Hudleton: 4 rec, 29 yards, 0 TD

=== Week 9: vs. Cincinnati Commandos ===
Week 9: Cincinnati Commandos at Marion Mayhem – Game summary

Quarter	1	2	3	4	Total
Commandos	10	14	0	14	38
Mayhem	0	7	7	6	20

at Veterans Memorial Coliseum, Marion, Ohio

- Date: May 8
- Game time: 7:30 p.m. EDT
- Game attendance: 1732

Game information

1st quarter

- Cincinnati – (12:09) Travis Johnson 46–yard field goal, Cincinnati 3–0
- Cincinnati - (3:30) Brandon Boehm 10-yard pass from Ben Mauk (Travis Johnson kick), Cincinnati 10-0

2nd quarter

- Marion - (14:52) Victor Tolbert 9-yard rush (John Sims kick), Cincinnati 10-7
- Cincinnati - (0:34) Greg Moore 45-yard pass from Ben Mauk (Travis Johnson kick), Cincinnati 17-7
- Cincinnati - (0:02) Ben Mauk 6-yard rush (Travis Johnson kick), Cincinnati 24-7

3rd quarter

- Marion - (5:51) Victor Tolbert 2-yard rush (John Sims kick), Cincinnati 24-14

4th quarter

- Cincinnati - (11:09) Robert Redd 24-yard pass from Ben Mauk (Travis Johnson kick), Cincinnati 31-14
- Cincinnati - (3:40) Jesse Wendt 7-yard pass from Ben Mauk (Travis Johnson kick), Cincinnati 38-14
- Marion - (2:58) Mike Tatum 53-yard kickoff return (Josh Davis pass failed), Cincinnati 38-20

Passing

- Cincinnati – Ben Mauk: 12/28, 149 yards, 4 TD
- Marion – Josh Davis: 12/30, 119 yards, 0 TD

Rushing

- Cincinnati – Ray Jackson: 6 att, 16 yards, 0 TD
- Marion - Josh Davis: 3 att, 24 yards, 0 TD

Receiving

- Cincinnati – Dominick Goodman: 4 rec, 36 yards, 0 TD
- Marion – Victor Tolbert: 5 rec, 29 yards, 0 TD

=== Week 10: vs. Fort Wayne FireHawks ===
Week 10: Fort Wayne FireHawks at Marion Mayhem – Game summary

Quarter	1	2	3	4	Total
FireHawks	2	0	0	0	2
Mayhem	0	0	0	0	0

- Date: May 15
- Game time: 7:00 p.m. EST

Game information

Marion Forfeit

=== Week 12: vs. Fort Wayne FireHawks ===
Week 12: Marion Mayhem at Fort Wayne FireHawks – Game summary

Quarter	1	2	3	4	Total
Mayhem	0	0	0	0	0
FireHawks	2	0	0	0	2

- Date: May 28
- Game time: 7:00 p.m. EST

Game information

Marion Forfeit

=== Week 13: vs. Wisconsin Wolfpack ===
Week 11: Wisconsin Wolfpack at Marion Mayhem – Game summary

Quarter	1	2	3	4	Total
Wolfpack	2	0	0	0	2
Mayhem	0	0	0	0	0

- Date: June 5
- Game time: 7:30 p.m. EST

Game information

Marion Forfeit

=== Week 14: vs. Miami Valley Silverbacks ===
Week 14: Miami Valley Silverbacks at Marion Mayhem – Game summary

Quarter	1	2	3	4	Total
Silverbacks	2	0	0	0	2
Mayhem	0	0	0	0	0

- Date: June 12
- Game time: 7:30 p.m. EST

Game information

Marion Forfeit
