= 2010 Fort Wayne FireHawks season =

- Owner: J. Michael Loomis
- General manager: J. Michael Loomis
- Head coach: Willie Davis Jr.
- Home stadium: Allen County War Memorial Coliseum

Results
- Record: 6–4
- League place: 3rd
- Playoffs: Lost CIFL Semifinals 24–25 (Wolfpack)

The 2010 Fort Wayne Firehawks season was the first season for the Continental Indoor Football League (CIFL) franchise. In November 2009, the FireHawks were announced as the successor team to the Fort Wayne Freedom. Owners J. Michael Loomis and John Christner purchased the assets left from the Freedom franchise, who had played the two seasons before the FireHawks were announced. Christner's first action as General Manager was naming former Freedom head coach Willie Davis as the team's first head coach. On December 9, 2009, it was confirmed that Loomis and Christner would take over the entities that used to run the Freedom. Before the season started, the team announced they had signed Katie Hnida as the team's placekicker. Hnida is best known for becoming the first woman to score a point in an NCAA football game and speaking out during the recruiting scandal at her first school, the University of Colorado.

According to The Journal Gazette in 2011, former players said they were still owed from the 2010 season. Team owner Mike Loomis did not confirm or deny the reports in that article. The team drew about 2,000 fans per game, according to CIFL stats.

== Players ==
=== Signings ===
Position	Player	2009 team
QB	Kota-Carone Colors	Fort Wayne Freedom
DB	Terry Moore	Milwaukee Bonecrushers
WR	Justin Wynn	Fort Wayne Freedom
WR	Mike Tatum	Marion Mayhem
DB	Jesse Allen	Erie RiverRats
WR	Chris Kolokithas	Erie RiverRats
DE	Thomas McKenzie	Marion Mayhem
DB	Bryan Williams	Marion Mayhem
OL	Anthony Harrison	Fort Wayne Freedom
OL/DL	Al Fertil	Fort Wayne Freedom
DL/DL	Brodrick Johnson	Fort Wayne Freedom

=== Final roster ===
2010 Fort Wayne FireHawks roster
Quarterbacks: 11 Kota-Carone Colors; 12 Mike Whitaker; Running backs: 4 Brandon Williams; Fullbacks: 43 Jesse Tuttle; Wide receivers: 3 Mike Tatum; 19 Brandon Walker-Roby; 2 Jermaine Woolfolk; 1 Justin Wynn	Offensive linemen: 76 Brandon Brenzier; 64 JaMarcus Green; 66 Anthony Harrison; 43 Jesse Tuttle; Defensive linemen: 31 Allen Craine; 90 Al Fertil; 48 Brodrick Johnson; 9 Thomas McKenzie	Linebackers: 20 Tramaine Billie; 18 David Hines; Defensive backs: 5 Jesse Allen; 7 Paul Carter; 6 Terry Moore; 10 Bryan Williams; Special teams: 17 John Rocholl	Reserve lists: 17 Katie Hnida K (IR); Practice squad: 80 Chris Kolokithas WR; 81 Zach Rainey WR; Updated June 19, 2010 rookies in italics 24 Active, 3 Inactive

== Staff ==
2010 Fort Wayne FireHawks staff
Front office: Owner/chairman/president/CEO – J. Michael Loomis; Public relations – Judi Loomis; Head coaches: Head coach – Willie Davis Jr.	Offensive coaches: Offensive coordinator/quarterbacks/wide receivers – Willie Davis Jr.; Offensive line – LaMar Martin; Defensive coaches: Defensive coordinator/defensive line – LaMar Martin; Defensive line assistant – Mike Hollingsworth; Linebackers/secondary – Donnie Caldwell; Special teams coaches: Special teams – Donnie Caldwell

== Schedule ==
=== Regular season ===
Week	Date	Kickoff	Opponent	Results		Game site
Week	Date	Kickoff	Opponent	Final score	Team record	Game site
1	Bye					
2	Bye					
3	Bye					
4	April 2	7:00 P.M. EDT	Cincinnati Commandos	L 27–55	0–1	Allen County War Memorial Coliseum
5	April 10	7:00 P.M. EDT	Miami Valley Silverbacks	W 44–28	1–1	Allen County War Memorial Coliseum
6	April 16	7:00 P.M. EDT	Wisconsin Wolfpack	L 0–49	1–2	Allen County War Memorial Coliseum
7	April 24	7:00 P.M. EDT	Chicago Cardinals	W 69–45	2–2	Allen County War Memorial Coliseum
8	May 1	7:00 p.m. CST	at Wisconsin Wolfpack	L 32–33	2–3	Hartmeyer Ice Arena
9	May 9	1:00 P.M. EDT	Miami Valley Silverbacks	W 26–8	3–3	Allen County War Memorial Coliseum
10	May 15	7:00 P.M. EDT	at Marion Mayhem	W 2–0 (Forfeit)	4–3	Veterans Memorial Coliseum
11	May 22	7:00 P.M. EDT	at Cincinnati Commandos	L 46–49	4–4	Cincinnati Gardens
12	May 28	7:00 P.M. EDT	Marion Mayhem	W 2–0 (Forfeit)	5–4	Allen County War Memorial Coliseum
13	June 5	7:00 P.M. CST	at Chicago Cardinals	W 48–0	6–4	Odeum Expo Center
14	Bye					

=== Standings ===
2010 Continental Indoor Football League
Team	W	L	T	PCT	PF	PA	PF (Avg.)	PA (Avg.)	STK
Cincinnati Commandos-y	9	1	0	.900	493	294	49.3	29.4	L1
Wisconsin Wolfpack-x	8	2	0	.800	345	213	34.5	21.3	W3
Fort Wayne FireHawks-x	6	4	0	.600	294	267	36.75	33.375	W2
Miami Valley Silverbacks-x	4	6	0	.400	309	354	34.33	39.33	W1
Marion Mayhem	3	7	0	.300	202	193	33.67	32.16	L5
Chicago Cardinals	0	10	0	.000	205	525	20.5	52.5	L10

== Regular season results ==
=== Week 4: vs. Cincinnati Commandos ===
The FireHawks suffered a loss in their first game as a franchise April 2, 2010, a 55–27 loss to the Cincinnati Commandos. During the game, the FireHawks also lost their quarterback, Adam Gibson, during the game, leaving the FireHawks searching for another quarterback before the next week.

Week 4: Cincinnati Commandos at Fort Wayne FireHawks – Game summary

Quarter	1	2	3	4	Total
Commandos	13	29	0	13	55
FireHawks	7	6	14	0	27

at Allen County War Memorial Coliseum, Fort Wayne, Indiana

- Date: April 2
- Game time: 7:00 p.m. EDT
- Game attendance: 2,456

Game information

1st quarter

- Fort wayne – (10:54) Brandon Williams 21-yard pass from Adam Gibson (Katie Hnida kick), Fort Wayne 7–0
- Cincinnati – (3:22) Brandon Boehm 10–yard pass from Ben Mauk (Travis Johnson kick), 7–7
- Cincinnati – (0:58) Greg Moore 6-yard pass from Ben Mauk (Travis Johnson kick failed), Cincinnati 13–7

2nd quarter

- Cincinnati – (9:40) Robert Redd 3-yard pass from Ben Mauk (Dominick Goodman pass from Ben Mauk), Cincinnati 21–7
- Cincinnati – (7:29) Dominick Goodman 21–yard pass from Ben Mauk (Travis Johnson kick), Cincinnati 28–7
- Fort wayne – (6:37) Justin Wynn 33-yard run (Katie Hnida kick blocked), Cincinnati 28–13
- Cincinnati – (0:30) Robbie Wilson 27-yard interception return (Travis Johnson kick), Cincinnati 35–13
- Cincinnati – (0:00) Robert Redd 35-yard interception return (Travis Johnson kick), Cincinnati 42–13

3rd quarter

- Fort wayne – (13:15) Justin Wynn 18-yard run (Chris Kolokithas pass from Justin Wynn), Cincinnati 42–21
- Fort wayne – (5:40) Brandon Williams 13-yard run (Justin Wynn pass failed), Cincinnati 42–27

4th quarter

- Cincinnati – (12:13) Greg Moore 11-yard run (Travis Johnson rush failed), Cincinnati 48–21
- Cincinnati – (0:10) Dominick Goodman 4–yard pass from Ben Mauk (Travis Johnson kick), Cincinnati 55–27

Passing

- Cincinnati – Ben Mauk: 16/23, 141 yards, 5 TD
- Fort wayne – Justin Wynn: 6/21, 44 yards, 0 TD

Rushing

- Cincinnati – Greg Moore: 10 att, 17 yards, 1 TD
- Fort wayne – Justin Wynn: 8 att, 85 yards, 2 TD

Receiving

- Cincinnati – Dominick Goodman: 6 rec, 61 yards, 2 TD
- Fort wayne – Zach Rainey: 5 rec, 53 yards, 0 TD

=== Week 5: vs. Miami Valley Silverbacks ===
The FireHawks earned their first victory April 10, 2010, 44–28 against the Miami Valley Silverbacks, as new quarterback, Kota Carone-Colors, paced the team with seven touchdown passes.

Week 5: Miami Valley Silverbacks at Fort Wayne FireHawks – Game summary

Quarter	1	2	3	4	Total
Silverbacks	6	8	6	8	28
FireHawks	20	6	6	12	44

at Allen County War Memorial Coliseum, Fort Wayne, Indiana

- Date: April 10
- Game time: 7:00 p.m. EDT
- Game attendance: 1,954

Game information

1st quarter

- Fort wayne – (14:05) Justin Wynn 31-yard pass from Kota-Carone Colors (Chris Kolokithas pass failed), Fort Wayne 6–0
- Fort wayne – (6:42) Justin Wynn 4-yard pass from Kota-Carone Colors (Kota-Carone Colors rush), Fort Wayne 14–0
- Miami valley – (5:11) Kyenes Mincy 26-yard pass from Shaun Kirby (Shaun Kirby kick failed), Fort Wayne 14–6
- Fort wayne – (00:33) Justin Wynn 7-yard pass from Kota-Carone Colors (Katie Hnida kick failed), Fort Wayne 20–6

2nd quarter

- Fort wayne – (5:32) Justin Wynn 31-yard pass from Kota-Carone Colors (Kota-Carone Colors pass failed), Fort Wayne 26–6
- Miami valley – (0:59) Derrick Moss 1-yard rush (Adell Givens rush), Fort Wayne 26–14

3rd quarter

- Fort wayne – (11:30) Justin Wynn 45-yard pass from Kota-Carone Colors (Katie Hnida kick failed), Fort Wayne 32–14
- Miami valley – (8:11) Kyenes Mincy 1-yard pass from Shaun Kirby (Shaun Kirby rush failed), Fort Wayne 32–20

4th quarter

- Fort wayne – (8:14) Brandon Walker-Roby 10-yard pass from Kota-Carone Colors (Chris Kolokithas rush failed), Fort Wayne 38–20
- Miami valley – (2:45) Adell Givens 1-yard rush (Austin Goss pass from Shaun Kirby), Fort Wayne 38–28
- Fort wayne – (0:39) Jermaine Woolfolk 29-yard pass from Kota-Carone Colors (Kota-Carone Colors pass failed), Fort Wayne 44–28

Passing

- Miami valley – Shaun Kirby: 10/28, 114 yards, 2 TD
- Fort wayne – Kota-Carone Colors: 17/30, 200 yards, 7 TD

Rushing

- Miami valley – Shaun Kirby: 6 att, 18 yards, 0 TD
- Fort wayne – Kota-Carone Colors: 8 att, 49 yards, 0 TD

Receiving

- Miami valley – Daniel Stover: 4 rec, 44 yards, 0 TD
- Fort wayne – Justin Wynn: 7 rec, 114 yards, 4 TD

=== Week 6: vs. Wisconsin Wolfpack ===
Throughout the season the team experienced many ups and downs, none lower than a 0–49 defeat at the hands of the Wisconsin Wolfpack. Three weeks into the season, the FireHawks received a blow, when co-owner and general manager John Christner left the organization, leaving Loomis as the sole owner.

Week 6: Wisconsin Wolfpack at Fort Wayne FireHawks – Game summary

Quarter	1	2	3	4	Total
Wolfpack	16	14	6	13	49
FireHawks	0	0	0	0	0

at Allen County War Memorial Coliseum, Fort Wayne, Indiana

- Date: April 16
- Game time: 7:00 p.m. EDT
- Game attendance: 2,074

Game information

1st quarter

- Wisconsin – (10:01) Tony Smidl 28-yard field goal Wisconsin 3–0
- Wisconsin – (2:55) Marcus Lewis 9-yard pass from Matt Schabert (Tony Smidl kick), Wisconsin 10–0
- Wisconsin – (0:14) Marcus Lewis 3-yard pass from Matt Schabert (Tony Smidl kick), Wisconsin 17–0

2nd quarter

- Wisconsin – (12:15) Marques Johnson 32-yard pass from Matt Schabert (Tony Smidl kick), Wisconsin 24–0
- Wisconsin – (2:51) Tony Smidl 41-yard field goal Wisconsin 27–0
- Wisconsin – (0:07) Tony Smidl 40-yard field goal Wisconsin 30–0

3rd quarter

- Wisconsin – (9:21) Marcus Lewis 8-yard pass from Matt Schabert (Tony Smidl kick failed), Wisconsin 36–0

4th quarter

- Wisconsin – (7:34) Marcus Lewis 2-yard pass from Dan Roberts (Tony Smidl kick), Wisconsin 43–0
- Wisconsin – (0:48) Eric Donoval 4-yard pass from Dan Roberts (Dan Roberts pass failed), Wisconsin 49–0

Passing

- Wisconsin – Matt Schabert: 12/21, 113 yards, 4 TD
- Fort wayne – Kota-Carone Colors: 10/32, 63 yards, 0 TD

Rushing

- Wisconsin – Matt Schabert: 4 att, 6 yards, 0 TD
- Fort wayne – Kota-Carone Colors: 4 att, 14 yards, 0 TD

Receiving

- Wisconsin – Marcus Lewis: 7 rec, 46 yards, 4 TD
- Fort wayne – Brandon Walker-Roby: 7 rec, 42 yards, 0 TD

=== Week 7: vs. Chicago Cardinals ===
The FireHawks' showed no effects from the front office problems, as the following week the team came out and defeated the Chicago Cardinals 69–45, but the team played without Hnida, as a blood clot on her foot put her out for the season.

Week 7: Chicago Cardinals at Fort Wayne FireHawks – Game summary

Quarter	1	2	3	4	Total
Cardinals	14	14	3	14	45
FireHawks	6	29	6	28	69

at Allen County War Memorial Coliseum, Fort Wayne, Indiana

- Date: April 24
- Game time: 7:00 p.m. EDT
- Game attendance: 2,020

Game information

1st quarter

- Fort wayne – (14:41) Brandon Walker-Roby 50-yard kickoff return (Chad Rollins kick failed), Fort Wayne 6–0
- Chicago – (7:41) Brandon Wogoman 20-yard pass from Ron Ricciardi (Julie Harshbarger kick), Chicago 7–6
- Chicago – (2:20) P Taylor 7-yard pass from Brandon Wogoman (Julie Harshbarger kick), Chicago 14–6

2nd quarter

- Fort wayne – (11:29) Kota-Carone Colors 2-yard rush (Kota-Carone Colors rush), 14–14
- Fort wayne – (9:25) Tramaine Billie 15-yard interception return (Chad Rollins kick), Fort Wayne 21–14
- Chicago – (5:17) P Taylor 5-yard rush (Julie Harshbarger kick failed), Fort Wayne 21–20
- Chicago – (2:35) P Taylor 3-yard rush (P Taylor rush), Chicago 28–21
- Fort wayne – (0:54) Kota-Carone Colors rush (Chad Rollins kick failed), Chicago 28–27
- Fort wayne – (0:03) Justin Wynn 12-yard pass from Kota-Carone Colors (Kota-Carone Colors rush), Fort Wayne 35–28

3rd quarter

- Chicago – (10:01) Julie Harshbarger 24-yard field goal, Fort Wayne 35–31
- Fort wayne – (0:00) Chris Kolokithas 7-yard pass from Kota-Carone Colors (Chad Rollins kick failed), Fort Wayne 41–31

4th quarter

- Chicago – (13:30) Brandon Wogoman 8-yard pass from Alex Nunez (Julie Harshbarger kick failed), Fort Wayne 41–37
- Fort wayne – (12:18) Justin Wynn 24-yard pass from Kota-Carone Colors (Kota-Carone Colors rush failed), Fort Wayne 47–37
- Fort wayne – (2:50) Brandon Williams 2-yard rush (Kota-Carone Colors rush), Fort Wayne 55–37
- Chicago – (1:25) Brandon Wogoman 23-yard pass from Ron Ricciardi (D Carter pass from Brandon Wogoman), Fort Wayne 55–45
- Fort wayne – (0:48) Brandon Williams 5-yard rush (Kota-Carone Colors rush), Fort Wayne 63–45
- Fort wayne – (0:00) Paul Carter 50-yard interception return (none attempted), Fort Wayne 69–45

Passing

- Chicago – Ron Ricciardi: 9/17, 94 yards, 2 TD
- Fort wayne – Kota-Carone Colors: 13/22, 122 yards, 4 TD

Rushing

- Chicago – P Taylor: 9 att, 41 yards, 2 TD
- Fort wayne – Kota-Carone Colors: 11 att, 63 yards, 2 TD

Receiving

- Chicago – Brandon Wogoman: 9 rec, 85 yards, 3 TD
- Fort wayne – Brandon Walker-Roby: 4 rec, 41 yards, 0 TD

=== Week 8: vs. Wisconsin Wolfpack ===
The FireHawks got a quick chance at revenge against the Wolfpack, but they failed losing 32–33 as they couldn't score from the 1-yard line with seconds left, as backup quarterback, Mike Whitaker's pass sailed over the hands of Jermaine Woolfolk. The FireHawks didn't dress a kicker during the game, citing "low ceilings" as the reason not to dress the team's new kicker, David McLane, an intern for the team.

Week 8: Fort Wayne FireHawks at Wisconsin Wolfpack – Game summary

Quarter	1	2	3	4	Total
FireHawks	6	6	12	8	32
Wolfpack	6	14	7	6	33

at Hartmeyer Arena, Madison, Wisconsin

- Date: May 1
- Game time: 7:00 p.m. CST

Game information

1st quarter

- Fort wayne – (11:44) Justin Wynn 26-yard pass from Kota-Carone Colors (Kota-Corone Colors rush failed), Fort Wayne 6–0
- Wisconsin – (6:10) Marques Johnson 25-yard pass from Matt Schabert (Tony Smidl kick failed), 6–6

2nd quarter

- Wisconsin – (5:05) Eric Donoval 4-yard rush (Tony Smidl kick), Wisconsin 13–6
- Wisconsin – (3:13) Quincy Hudson 25-yard interception return (Tony Smidl kick), Wisconsin 20–6
- Fort wayne – (0:30) Jermaine Woolfolk 9-yard pass from Mike Whitaker (Mike Whitaker pass failed) Wisconsin 20–12

3rd quarter

- Fort wayne – (8:21) Jermaine Woolfolk 17-yard pass from Mike Whitaker (Mike Whitaker pass failed) Wisconsin 20–18
- Fort wayne – (3:48) Tramaine Billie 40-yard interception return (Mike Whitaker pass failed), Fort Wayne 24–20
- Wisconsin – (0:39) Matt Schabert 1-yard rush (Tony Smidl kick), Wisconsin 27–24

4th quarter

- Fort wayne – (14:02) Brandon Williams 23-yard rush (Zack Rainey pass from Mike Whitaker), Fort Wayne 32–27
- Wisconsin – (6:20) Marcus Lewis 6-yard pass from Matt Schabert (Tony Smidl pass intercepted), Wisconsin 33–32

Passing

- Wisconsin – Matt Schabert: 12/21, 113 yards, 4 TD
- Fort wayne – Mike Whitaker: 7/17, 63 yards, 2 TD

Rushing

- Wisconsin – Matt Schabert: 5 att, 7 yards, 1 TD
- Fort wayne – Brandon Williams: 7 att, 42 yards, 1 TD

Receiving

- Wisconsin – Deqwan Young: 7 rec, 65 yards, 0 TD
- Fort wayne – Zack Rainey: 6 rec, 27 yards, 0 TD

=== Week 9: vs. Miami Valley Silverbacks ===
The FireHawks won their next game against Miami Valley, 26–8.

Week 9: Miami Valley Silverbacks at Fort Wayne FireHawks – Game summary

Quarter	1	2	3	4	Total
Silverbacks	0	0	8	0	8
FireHawks	7	7	6	6	26

at Allen County War Memorial Coliseum, Fort Wayne, Indiana

- Date: May 9
- Game time: 1:00 p.m. EST
- Game attendance: 1,353

Game information

1st quarter

- Fort wayne – (5:36) Zack Rainey 25-yard pass from Kota-Carone Colors (Brian Clawson kick), Fort Wayne 7–0

2nd quarter

- Fort wayne – (13:00) Tramaine Billie 3-yard rush (Brian Clawson kick), Fort Wayne 14–0

3rd quarter

- Fort wayne – (6:28) Tramaine Billie 6-yard rush (Brian Clawson kick failed), Fort Wayne 20–0
- Miami valley – (1:45) Aric Evans 16-yard pass from Chris Stanford (Larry Byndon pass from Chris Stanford), Fort Wayne 20–8

4th quarter

- Fort wayne – (8:50) Tramaine Billie 0-yard blocked field goal return (Mike Whitaker pass failed), Fort Wayne 26–8

Passing

- Miami valley – Kyenes Mincy: 10/25, 118 yards, 0 TD
- Fort wayne – Kota-Carone Colors: 10/15, 99 yards, 1 TD

Rushing

- Miami valley – Kyenes Mincy: 8 att, 17 yards, 0 TD
- Fort wayne – Justin Wynn: 1 att, 12 yards, 0 TD

Receiving

- Miami valley – Melvin Bryant: 5 rec, 44 yards, 0 TD
- Fort wayne – Zack Rainey: 5 rec, 54 yards, 1 TD

=== Week 10: vs. Marion Mayhem ===
During the week before the team's first game at the Marion Mayhem, Loomis stated that the team would continue to play despite its mounting financial struggles. The Mayhem, who were having financial problems of their own, forced the FireHawks next game back to June 12.

Week 10: Fort Wayne FireHawks at Marion Mayhem – Game summary

Quarter	1	2	3	4	Total
FireHawks	2	0	0	0	2
Mayhem	0	0	0	0	0

at (forfeit, game was not played)

- Date: May 15
- Game time: 7:00 p.m. EST

Game information

Marion Forfeit

=== Week 11: vs. Cincinnati Commandos ===
The FireHawks continued their season the following week against the undefeated Commandos, losing 46–49 after leading by 12 with 4:12 left in the game.

Week 11: Fort Wayne FireHawks at Cincinnati Commandos – Game summary

Quarter	1	2	3	4	Total
FireHawks	12	6	16	12	46
Commandos	7	14	6	22	49

at Cincinnati Gardens, Cincinnati, Ohio

- Date: May 22
- Game time: 7:00 p.m. EDT
- Game attendance: 2,218

Game information

1st quarter

- Cincinnati – (11:47) Dominick Goodman 10–yard pass from Ben Mauk (Travis Johnson kick), Cincinnati 7–0
- Fort wayne – (7:55) Tramaine Billie 2–yard rush (Brian Clawson kick failed), Cincinnati 7–6
- Fort wayne – (1:00) Jesse Allen 0-yard fumble recovery (Kota-Carone Colors pass intercepted), Fort Wayne 12–7

2nd quarter

- Cincinnati - (13:44) Dominick Goodman 4-yard pass from Ben Mauk (Travis Johnson kick), Cincinnati 14-12
- Fort Wayne - (11:13) Tramaine Billie 2-yard rush (Brian Clawson kick failed), Fort Wayne 18-14
- Cincinnati - (6:30) Johnny Long 14-yard pass from Ben Mauk (Travis Johnson kick), Cincinnati 21-18

3rd quarter

- Fort Wayne - (14:51) Justin Wynn 57-yard kickoff return (Kota-Carone Colors pass to Chirs Kolokithas), Fort Wayne 26-21
- Cincinnati - (11:32) Dominick Goodman 6-yard pass from Ben Mauk (Ben Mauk pass failed), Cincinnati 27-26
- Fort Wayne - (1:32) Tramaine Billie 3-yard rush (Tramaine Billie rush)

4th quarter

- Fort Wayne - (10:31) Tramaine 0-yard fumble recovery (Brian Clawson kick failed), Fort Wayne 40-27
- Cincinnati - (9:28) Greg Moore 5-yard rush (Travis Johnson kick), Fort Wayne 40-34
- Fort Wayne - (4:16) Tramaine Billie 5-yard rush (Brian Clawson kick blocked), Fort Wayne 46-34
- Cincinnati - (2:45) Greg Moore 40-yard pass from Ben Mauk (Travis Johnson kick), Fort Wayne 46-41
- Cincinnati - (0:50) E.J. Underwood 53-yard missed FG return (Ray Jackson rush), Cincinnati 49-46

Passing

- Fort wayne – Kota-Carone Colors: 6/18, 56 yards, 0 TD
- Cincinnati – Ben Mauk: 20/32, 167 yards, 5 TD

Rushing

- Fort wayne – Kota-Carone Colors: 6 att, 41 yards, 0 TD
- Cincinnati – Greg Moore: 8 att, 37 yards, 1 TD

Receiving

- Fort wayne – Jermaine Woolfolk: 3 rec, 17 yards, 0 TD
- Cincinnati – Brandon Boehm: 6 rec, 35 yards, 0 TD

=== Week 12: vs. Marion Mayhem ===
The team was scheduled to the Mayhem the next week, but before they played the FireHawks the franchise folded. The folding of Marion credited the FireHawks with two forfeit wins, but hurt the team financially by costing them a home game. Because the Mayhem didn't finish the season, several of Marion's players were signed by Fort Wayne in the subsequent weeks to join in the FireHawks' playoff run.

FORFEIT BY MARION

Quarter	1	2	3	4	Total
Mayhem	0	0	0	0	0
FireHawks	2	0	0	0	2

- Date: May 28
- Game time: 7:00 p.m. EST
- (forfeit, game was not played)

Game information

Marion Forfeit

=== Week 14: vs. Chicago Cardinals ===
The FireHawks went to Chicago and shutout the Cardinals 48–0. The FireHawks finished 6–4 during the 2010 Continental Indoor Football League season, earning a third-seed in the playoffs.

Week 14: Fort Wayne FireHawks at Chicago Cardinals – Game summary

Quarter	1	2	3	4	Total
FireHawks	14	6	22	6	48
Cardinals	0	0	0	0	0

at Odeum Expo Center, Villa Park, Illinois

- Date: June 5
- Game time: 7:00 p.m. CDT
- Game attendance: 375

Game information

1st quarter

- Fort wayne – (13:38) Terry Moore 48-yard interception return (John Rocholl kick blocked), Fort Wayne 6–0
- Fort wayne – (6:48) Justin Wynn 24-yard pass from Kota-Carone Colors (Kota-Carone Colors pass to Brandon Williams), Fort Wayne 14–0

2nd quarter

- Fort wayne – (8:40) Tramaine Billie 10-yard blocked FG return (John Rocholl kick failed), Fort Wayne 20–0

3rd quarter

- Fort wayne – (10:40) Mike Tatum 12-yard pass from Mike Whitaker (John Rocholl kick), Fort Wayne 27–0
- Fort wayne – (9:01) Brandon Williams 23-yard fumble recovery (Mike Whitaker pass to Mike Tatum), Fort Wayne 35–0
- Fort wayne – (4:06) Mike Tatum 41-yard missed FG return (John Rocholl kick), Fort Wayne 42–0

4th quarter

- Fort wayne – (13:40) Tramaine Billie 35-yard interception return (Mike Whitaker pass failed), Fort Wayne 48–0

Passing

- Fort wayne – Kota-Carone Colors: 4/8, 58 yards, 1 TD
- Chicago – Ron Ricciardi: 4/12, 27 yards, 0 TD

Rushing

- Fort wayne – Victor Tolbert: 5 att, 20 yards, 0 TD
- Chicago – Michael Hayden: 4 att, 16 yards, 0 TD

Receiving

- Fort wayne – Justin Wynn: 4 rec, 58 yards, 1 TD
- Chicago – Shawn McKeown: 4 rec, 21 yards, 0 TD

== Postseason ==
=== Schedule ===
Week	Date	Kickoff	Opponent	Results		Game site
Week	Date	Kickoff	Opponent	Final score	Team record	Game site
1	June 19	7:00 p.m. CST	at Wisconsin Wolfpack	L 24–25	0–1	Hartmeyer Ice Arena

== Postseason results ==
=== Semifinals: vs. Wisconsin Wolfpack ===
In the first playoff game in team history, the FireHawks lost to the second-place Wolfpack, 25–24.

Semifinals: Fort Wayne FireHawks at Wisconsin Wolfpack – Game summary

Quarter	1	2	3	4	Total
FireHawks	12	6	0	6	24
Wolfpack	6	6	7	6	25

at Hartmeyer Arena, Madison, Wisconsin

- Date: June 19
- Game time: 7:00 p.m. CST

Game information

1st quarter

- Fort wayne – (7:40) Kota-Carone Colors 1-yard rush (John Rocholl kick failed), Fort Wayne 6–0
- Wisconsin – (4:30) Marcus Lewis 3-yard pass from Matt Schabert (Tony Smidl kick failed), 6–6
- Fort wayne – (2:14) Victor Tolbert 14-yard rush (Kota-Carone Colors pass failed), Fort Wayne 12–6

2nd quarter

- Wisconsin – (12:52) Marcus Lewis 4-yard pass from Matt Schabert (Tony Smidl kick blocked), 12–12
- Fort wayne – (0:08) Victor Tolbert 3-yard rush (John Rocholl kick failed), Fort Wayne 18–12

3rd quarter

- Wisconsin – (2:25) Marques Johnson 2-yard pass from Matt Schabert (Tony Smidl kick) Wisconsin 19–18

4th quarter

- Wisconsin – (11:22) Matt Schabert 2-yard rush (Tony Smidl kick failed), Wisconsin 25–18
- Fort wayne – (6:58) Kota-Carone Colors 11-yard rush (John Rocholl kick blocked), Wisconsin 25–24

Passing

- Wisconsin – Matt Schabert: 12/23, 107 yards, 3 TD
- Fort wayne – Kota-Carone Colors: 5/16, 35 yards, 0 TD

Rushing

- Wisconsin – Matt Schabert: 8 att, 22 yards, 1 TD
- Fort wayne – Victor Tolbert: 13 att, 53 yards, 2 TD

Receiving

- Wisconsin – Marcus Lewis: 8 rec, 77 yards, 2 TD
- Fort wayne – Brandon Williams: 2 rec, 20 yards, 0 TD

== Stats ==
=== Passing ===
Player	Comp.	Att.	Comp%	Yards	TD's	INT's	Rating
Kota-Carone Colors	71	155	45.8%	694	14	9	92.3
Mike Whitaker	14	35	40%	144	3	2	83.9
Ean Decker	5	14	35.7%	30	0	1	4.8
Adam Gibson	4	14	28.6%	43	1	0	89.2

=== Rushing ===
Player	Car.	Yards	Avg.	TD's	Long
Kota-Carone Colors	42	235	5.4	4	28
Justin Wynn	12	115	9.0	2	33
Brandon Williams	18	87	4.2	3	23
Victor Tolbert	18	73	4.1	2	14
Tramaine Billie	12	34	2.8	6	7
Jesse Tuttle	6	27	4.5	2	16

=== Receiving ===
Player	Rec.	Yards	Avg.	TD's	Long
Justin Wynn	25	358	14.3	8	45
Zach Rainey	21	162	7.7	1	25
Brandon Walker-Roby	19	124	6.5	2	19
Jermaine Woolfolk	11	109	9.9	3	29
Jesse Tuttle	3	18	6	1	9

== CIFL awards ==
- Co-Defensive Player of the Year - Tramaine Billie
- Special Teams Player of the Year - Mike Tatum (Also played with the Marion Mayhem during 2010 season)

1st Team All-CIFL

- WR Justin Wynn
- LB Tramaine Billie
- KR Mike Tatum

2nd Team All-CIFL

- C Anothony Harrison
- DE Brodrick Johnson
- DE Thomas McKenzie (Also played with the Marion Mayhem during 2010 season)
- DB Paul Carter
