= 2010 Wisconsin Wolfpack season =

- Head coach: Jordan Kopac
- Home stadium: Hartmeyer Arena

Results
- Record: 8-2
- League place: 2nd
- Playoffs: Won Semifinals 25-24 (FireHawks); Lost CIFL Championship Game (Commandos)

The 2010 Wisconsin Wolfpack season was the second season for the Continental Indoor Football League (CIFL) franchise. For 2010, the Wolfpack chose to move its home games to the Hartmeyer Arena on the northeast side of Madison. 2010 also saw the team stock its roster with more players from the nearby Wisconsin Badgers football program. Joining defensive lineman Kurt Ware and linebacker James Kamoku from the 2009 Wolfpack would be tight end Andy Crooks, safety Josh Nettles, defensive lineman Ricky Garner, offensive lineman Kenny Jones and, following a season-ending injury to quarterback Brian Ryczkowski, Matt Schabert. Under Schabert's guidance, the Wolfpack had its most successful season to date, indoor or outdoor, finishing the regular season 8-2 and becoming the only team to defeat the then-undefeated Cincinnati Commandos. The Wolfpack would win its first-ever home playoff game, beating the Fort Wayne FireHawks, 25-24, before falling to the Commandos in the 2010 CIFL Championship Game, 54-40, in Cincinnati.

== Schedule ==
Week	Date	Opponent	Home/Away	Result
1		Bye	Week	
2		Bye	Week	
3		Bye	Week	
4	April 3	Miami Valley Silverbacks	Home	Won, 38-32
5	April 10	Cincinnati Commandos	Away	Lost, 26-48
6	April 16	Fort Wayne Firehawks	Away	Win, 49-0
7	April 24	Marion Mayhem	Home	Won, 34-20
8	May 1	Fort Wayne Firehawks	Home	Won, 33-32
9	May 8	Chicago Cardinals	Away	Won, 44-18
10	May 15	Miami Valley Silverbacks	Home	Lost, 18-22
11	May 22	Chicago Cardinals	Home	Won, 58-20
12	May 29	Cincinnati Commandos	Home	Won, 45-21
13	June 5	Marion Mayhem	Away	Won, 2-0 (Forfeit)

== Standings ==
2010 Continental Indoor Football League
Team	W	L	T	PCT	PF	PA	PF (Avg.)	PA (Avg.)	STK
Cincinnati Commandos-y	9	1	0	.900	493	294	49.3	29.4	L1
Wisconsin Wolfpack-x	8	2	0	.800	345	213	34.5	21.3	W3
Fort Wayne FireHawks-x	6	4	0	.600	294	267	36.75	33.375	W2
Miami Valley Silverbacks-x	4	6	0	.400	309	354	34.33	39.33	W1
Marion Mayhem	3	7	0	.300	202	193	33.67	32.16	L5
Chicago Cardinals	0	10	0	.000	205	525	20.5	52.5	L10

== Playoff schedule ==
Week	Date	Opponent	Home/Away	Result
Semifinals	June 19	Fort Wayne Firehawks	Home	Won, 25-24
CIFL Championship Game	June 25	Cincinnati Commandos	Away	Lost, 40-54

== Roster ==
2010 Wisconsin Wolfpack roster
Quarterbacks: 12 Dan Roberts; 18 Matt Schabert; Running backs: 7 Brandon Wogoman; Wide receivers: 6 Marques Johnson; 11 Marcus Lewis; 2 Calvin Thomas; 5 Will Norwood; 86 Joey Schutz	Offensive linemen: 14 Rob Gilbreath; 54 Adam Hite; 92 Matt Rahn; Defensive linemen: 49 Taz Landry; 94 Mike Matranga; 34 Kurt Ware; 97 Anthony White	Linebackers: 27 Jim Cichon; 22 James Kamoku; Defensive backs: 9 David Earl; 1 Quincy Hudson; 3 Josh Nettles; 15 DeQwan Young; Special teams: 10 Tony Smidl	Reserve lists: Currently vacant; Updated June 26, 2010 Rookies in italics 22 Active, 0 Inactive

== Stats ==
=== Passing ===
Player	Comp.	Att.	Comp%	Yards	TD's	INT's	Rating
Matt Schabert	137	227	60.4%	1299	32	10	104.5
Dan Roberts	19	43	44.2%	177	4	2	91.0
Brian Ryczkowski	5	10	50%	46	2	2	95.8
Shane Alder	2	5	40%	28	1	0	89.2

=== Rushing ===
Player	Car.	Yards	Avg.	TD's	Long
Eric Donoval	58	189	3.3	11	23
Matt Schabert	28	92	3.3	4	17
Dan Roberts	18	69	3.1	1	21
Brandon Wogoman	6	19	3.2	0	9

=== Receiving ===
Player	Rec.	Yards	Avg.	TD's	Long
Marcus Lewis	53	446	8.4	15	31
Marques Johnson	32	461	14.4	11	35
Eric Donoval	23	162	7	7	30
Brandon Wogoman	19	209	11	2	39

== Regular season ==
=== Week 4: vs. Miami Valley Silverbacks ===
Week 4: Miami Valley Silverbacks at Wisconsin Wolfpack – Game summary

Quarter	1	2	3	4	Total
Silverbacks	0	6	12	14	32
Wolfpack	12	6	7	13	38

at Hartmeyer Arena, Madison, Wisconsin

- Date: April 3
- Game time: 7:30 p.m. CDT
- Game attendance: 1,484
- Referee: Tommy Tyks Umpire: Paul Black Linesman: Rich Klein Line judge: PJ way Back judge: Mark Thompson

Game information

1st quarter

- Wisconsin – (10:45) Marcus Lewis 4-yard pass Brian Ryczkowski (Tony Smidl kick failed), Wisconsin 6–0
- Wisconsin – (4:20) Marques Johnson 10-yard pass from Brian Ryczkowski (Marques Johnson pass failed), Wisconsin 12–0

2nd quarter

- Miami Valley – (0:14) Derrick Moss 9-yard pass from Shaun Kirby (Shaun Kirby rush failed), Wisconsin 12–6
- Wisconsin – (0:01) Eric Donoval 1-yard rush (Eric Donoval rush failed), Wisconsin 18–6

3rd quarter

- Miami Valley – (9:23) Derrick Moss 14-yard pass from Shaun Kirby (Shaun Kirby rush failed), Wisconsin 18–12
- Wisconsin – (7:04) Eric Donoval 2-yard rush (Tony Smidl kick), Shaun Kirby kick blocked), Wisconsin 25–18

4th quarter

- Miami Valley – (14:50) Raymond Huff safety, Wisconsin 25–20
- Miami Valley – (12:08) Daniel Stover 18-yard pass from Shaun Kirby (Derrick Moss rush failed), Miami Valley 26–25
- Wisconsin – (10:26) Eric Donoval 1-yard rush (Shane Alder pass failed), Wisconsin 31–26
- Wisconsin – (7:47) Calvin Thomas 3-yard pass from Shane Alder (Tony Smidl kick), Wisconsin 38–26
- Miami Valley – (4:32) Shaun Kirby 19-yard rush (Shaun Kirby pass failed), Wisconsin 38–32

Passing

- Miami Valley – Shaun Kirby: 14/32, 131 yards, 4 TD
- Wisconsin – Brian Ryczkowski: 5/10, 46 yards, 2 TD

Rushing

- Miami Valley – Shaun Kirby: 8 att, 37 yards, 1 TD
- Wisconsin – Eric Donoval: 12 att, 53 yards, 3 TD

Receiving

- Miami Valley – Daniel Stover: 4 rec, 57 yards, 1 TD
- Wisconsin – Marques Johnson: 3 rec, 54 yards, 1 TD

=== Week 5: vs. Cincinnati Commandos ===
Week 5: Wisconsin Wolfpack at Cincinnati Commandos – Game summary

Quarter	1	2	3	4	Total
Wolfpack	6	7	7	6	26
Commandos	13	14	6	15	48

at Cincinnati Gardens, Cincinnati, Ohio

- Date: April 10
- Game time: 7:00 p.m. EDT
- Game attendance: 3,049

Game information

1st quarter

- Cincinnati – (14:07) Brandon Boehm 40-yard pass from Ben Mauk (Travis Johnson kick), Cincinnati 7–0
- Wisconsin – (4:23) Dan Roberts 15-yard rush (Tony Smidl kick failed), Cincinnati 7–6
- Cincinnati - (1:55) Dominick Goodman 11-yard pass from Ben Mauk (Travis Johnson kick blocked), Cincinnati 13-6

2nd quarter

- Cincinnati - (8:28) Dominick Goodman 10-yard pass from Ben Mauk (Ben Mauk pass to Robert Redd), Cincinnati 21-6
- Wisconsin – (3:35) Andre Drye 10-yard interception return (Tony Smidl kick), Cincinnati 21–13
- Cincinnati - (0:51) Dominick Goodman 19-yard pass from Ben Mauk (Travis Johnson kick failed), Cincinnati 27-13

3rd quarter

- Wisconsin – (13:50) Calvin Thomas 9-yard pass from Dan Roberts (Tony Smidl kick), Cincinnati 27–20
- Cincinnati - (8:31) Dominick Goodman 7-yard pass from Ben Mauk (Ben Mauk pass failed), Cincinnati 33-20

4th quarter

- Cincinnati - (13:51) Ray Jackson 4-yard rush (Greg Moore rush), Cincinnati 41-20
- Cincinnati - (1:00) Brandon Boehm 13-yard pass from Ben Mauk (Travis Johnson kick), Cincinnati 48-20
- Wisconsin – (0:03) Marcus Lewis 14-yard pass from Dan Roberts (Dan Roberts rush failed), Cincinnati 48–26

Passing

- Wisconsin – Dan Roberts: 10/20, 86 yards, 2 TD
- Cincinnati – Ben Mauk: 15/24, 196 yards, 6 TD

Rushing

- Wisconsin – Dan Roberts: 11 att, 40 yards, 1 TD
- Cincinnati – Ray Jackson: 7 att, 45 yards, 1 TD

Receiving

- Wisconsin – Marcus Lewis: 5 rec, 34 yards, 1 TD
- Cincinnati – Dominick Goodman: 7 rec, 82 yards, 4 TD

=== Week 6: vs. Fort Wayne FireHawks ===
Week 6: Wisconsin Wolfpack at Fort Wayne FireHawks – Game summary

Quarter	1	2	3	4	Total
Wolfpack	16	14	6	13	49
FireHawks	0	0	0	0	0

at Allen County War Memorial Coliseum, Fort Wayne, Indiana

- Date: April 16
- Game time: 7:00 p.m. EDT
- Game attendance: 2,074

Game information

1st quarter

- Wisconsin – (10:01) Tony Smidl 28-yard field goal Wisconsin 3–0
- Wisconsin – (2:55) Marcus Lewis 9-yard pass from Matt Schabert (Tony Smidl kick), Wisconsin 10–0
- Wisconsin – (0:14) Marcus Lewis 3-yard pass from Matt Schabert (Tony Smidl kick), Wisconsin 17–0

2nd quarter

- Wisconsin – (12:15) Marques Johnson 32-yard pass from Matt Schabert (Tony Smidl kick), Wisconsin 24–0
- Wisconsin – (2:51) Tony Smidl 41-yard field goal Wisconsin 27–0
- Wisconsin – (0:07) Tony Smidl 40-yard field goal Wisconsin 30–0

3rd quarter

- Wisconsin – (9:21) Marcus Lewis 8-yard pass from Matt Schabert (Tony Smidl kick failed), Wisconsin 36–0

4th quarter

- Wisconsin – (7:34) Marcus Lewis 2-yard pass from Dan Roberts (Tony Smidl kick), Wisconsin 43–0
- Wisconsin – (0:48) Eric Donoval 4-yard pass from Dan Roberts (Dan Roberts pass failed), Wisconsin 49–0

Passing

- Wisconsin – Matt Schabert: 12/21, 113 yards, 4 TD
- Fort Wayne – Kota-Carone Colors: 10/32, 63 yards, 0 TD

Rushing

- Wisconsin – Matt Schabert: 4 att, 6 yards, 0 TD
- Fort Wayne – Kota-Carone Colors: 4 att, 14 yards, 0 TD

Receiving

- Wisconsin – Marcus Lewis: 7 rec, 46 yards, 4 TD
- Fort Wayne – Brandon Walker-Roby: 7 rec, 42 yards, 0 TD

=== Week 7: vs. Marion Mayhem ===
Week 7: Marion Mayhem at Wisconsin Wolfpack – Game summary

Quarter	1	2	3	4	Total
Mayhem	7	13	0	0	20
Wolfpack	6	14	8	6	34

at Hartmeyer Arena, Madison, Wisconsin

- Date: April 24
- Game time: 7:30 p.m. CDT

Game information

1st quarter

- Wisconsin – (8:24) Marques Johnson 20-yard pass from Matt Schabert (Tony Smidl kick failed), Wisconsin 6–0
- Marion – (6:14) Mike Tatum 29-yard pass from Josh Davis (John Sims kick), Marion 7–6

2nd quarter

- Marion – (10:11) Maurice Douse 19-yard pass from Josh Davis (John Sims kick blocked), Marion 13–6
- Wisconsin – (4:31) Marcus Lewis 19-yard pass from Matt Schabert (Tony Smidl kick), 13–13
- Marion – (3:55) Mike Tatum 49-yard kickoff return (John Sims kick), Marion 20–13
- Wisconsin – (2:06) Eric Donoval 19-yard rush (Tony Smidl kick), 20-20

3rd quarter

- Wisconsin – (4:05) Eric Donoval 7-yard pass from Matt Schabert (Tony Smidl rush), Wisconsin 28-20

4th quarter

- Wisconsin – (2:09) Eric Donoval 7-yard pass from Matt Schabert (Tony Smidl kick blocked), Wisconsin 34-20

Passing

- Marion – Josh Davis: 12/32, 114 yards, 2 TD
- Wisconsin – Matt Schabert: 12/24, 121 yards, 4 TD

Rushing

- Marion – Josh Davis: 8 att, 45 yards, 0 TD
- Wisconsin – Eric Donoval: 6 att, 40 yards, 1 TD

Receiving

- Marion – Mike Tatum: 5 rec, 57 yards, 1 TD
- Wisconsin – Eric Donoval: 4 rec, 32 yards, 2 TD

=== Week 8: vs. Fort Wayne FireHawks ===
Week 8: Fort Wayne FireHawks at Wisconsin Wolfpack – Game summary

Quarter	1	2	3	4	Total
FireHawks	6	6	12	8	32
Wolfpack	6	14	7	6	33

at Hartmeyer Arena, Madison, Wisconsin

- Date: May 1
- Game time: 7:00 p.m. CST

Game information

1st quarter

- Fort Wayne – (11:44) Justin Wynn 26-yard pass from Kota-Carone Colors (Kota-Corone Colors rush failed), Fort Wayne 6–0
- Wisconsin – (6:10) Marques Johnson 25-yard pass from Matt Schabert (Tony Smidl kick failed), 6–6

2nd quarter

- Wisconsin – (5:05) Eric Donoval 4-yard rush (Tony Smidl kick), Wisconsin 13–6
- Wisconsin – (3:13) Quincy Hudson 25-yard interception return (Tony Smidl kick), Wisconsin 20–6
- Fort Wayne – (0:30) Jermaine Woolfolk 9-yard pass from Mike Whitaker (Mike Whitaker pass failed) Wisconsin 20–12

3rd quarter

- Fort Wayne – (8:21) Jermaine Woolfolk 17-yard pass from Mike Whitaker (Mike Whitaker pass failed) Wisconsin 20–18
- Fort Wayne – (3:48) Tramaine Billie 40-yard interception return (Mike Whitaker pass failed), Fort Wayne 24–20
- Wisconsin – (0:39) Matt Schabert 1-yard rush (Tony Smidl kick), Wisconsin 27–24

4th quarter

- Fort Wayne – (14:02) Brandon Williams 23-yard rush (Zack Rainey pass from Mike Whitaker), Fort Wayne 32–27
- Wisconsin – (6:20) Marcus Lewis 6-yard pass from Matt Schabert (Tony Smidl pass intercepted), Wisconsin 33–32

Passing

- Wisconsin – Matt Schabert: 12/21, 113 yards, 4 TD
- Fort Wayne – Mike Whitaker: 7/17, 63 yards, 2 TD

Rushing

- Wisconsin – Matt Schabert: 5 att, 7 yards, 1 TD
- Fort Wayne – Brandon Williams: 7 att, 42 yards, 1 TD

Receiving

- Wisconsin – Deqwan Young: 7 rec, 65 yards, 0 TD
- Fort Wayne – Zack Rainey: 6 rec, 27 yards, 0 TD

=== Week 9: vs. Chicago Cardinals ===
Week 9: Wisconsin Wolfpack at Chicago Cardinals – Game summary

Quarter	1	2	3	4	Total
Wolfpack	22	8	12	2	44
Cardinals	6	6	6	0	18

at Odeum Expo Center, Villa Park, Illinois

- Date: May 8
- Game time: 7:30 p.m. CDT
- Game attendance: 350

Game information

1st quarter

- Wisconsin – (13:32) Eric Donoval 5–yard rush (Matt Schabert drop-kick), Wisconsin 8–0
- Wisconsin – (7:56) Eric Donoval 2–yard rush (Matt Schabert drop-kick), Wisconsin 16–0
- Chicago - (5:21) Shawn McKeown 10-yard pass from Ron Ricciardi (P Taylor rush failed), Wisconsin 16-6
- Wisconsin – (3:30) Eric Donoval 30–yard pass from Matt Schabert (Matt Schabert drop-kick failed), Wisconsin 22–6

2nd quarter

- Wisconsin - (8:49) Marques Johnson 20-yard pass from Matt Schabert (Matt Schabert drop-kick), Wisconsin 30-6
- Chicago - (5:25) P Taylor 8-yard pass from Ron Ricciardi (Julie Harshbarger kick failed), Wisconsin 30-12

3rd quarter

- Wisconsin – (5:33) Eric Donoval 23–yard rush (Matt Schabert drop-kick failed), Wisconsin 36–12
- Chicago - (4:30) Shawn McKeown 16-yard pass from Ron Ricciardi (Ron Ricciardi pass failed), Wisconsin 36-18
- Wisconsin – (0:00) Eric Donoval 7–yard pass from Matt Schabert (Matt Schabert drop-kick failed), Wisconsin 42–18

4th quarter

- Wisconsin – (9:00) Team Safety, Wisconsin 44–18

Passing

- Wisconsin – Matt Schabert: 15/26, 196 yards, 3 TD
- Chicago – Ron Ricciardi: 10/26, 69 yards, 3 TD

Rushing

- Wisconsin – Eric Donoval: 9 att, 50 yards, 3 TD
- Chicago – P Taylor: 1 att, -1 yards, 0 TD

Receiving

- Wisconsin – Marques Johnson: 6 rec, 112 yards, 1 TD
- Chicago – D Jones: 3 rec, 11 yards, 0 TD

=== Week 10: vs. Miami Valley Silverbacks ===
Week 10: Miami Valley Silverbacks at Wisconsin Wolfpack – Game summary

Quarter	1	2	3	4	Total
Silverbacks	0	7	7	8	22
Wolfpack	6	6	6	0	18

at Hartmeyer Arena, Madison, Wisconsin

- Date: May 15
- Game time: 7:30 p.m. CDT
- Game attendance: 113
- Referee: Jim Bernardi Umpire: Chuck Poynter Linesman: Chad Davis Line judge: PJ Way Back judge: Aaron Link

Game information

1st quarter

- Wisconsin – (0:10) T Fitch 4-yard pass Matt Schabert (Tony Smidl kick failed), Wisconsin 6–0

2nd quarter

- Wisconsin – (6:49) Eric Donoval 4-yard rush (Tony Smidl failed), Wisconsin 12–0
- Miami Valley – (0:00) Derrick Moss 1-yard rush (Jason Cunningham kick), Wisconsin 12–7

3rd quarter

- Miami Valley – (5:41) Aric Evans 9-yard pass from Kyenes Mincy (Jason Cunningham kick), Miami Valley 14–12
- Wisconsin – (2:16) Eric Donoval 4-yard rush (Matt Schabert drop-kick failed), Wisconsin 18–14

4th quarter

- Miami Valley – (11:07) Team safety, Wisconsin 18–16
- Miami Valley – (0:00) Derrick Crawford 14-yard miss field goal return (none attempted), Miami Valley 22–18

Passing

- Miami Valley – Kyenes Mincy: 5/18, 67 yards, 1 TD
- Wisconsin – Matt Schabert: 11/22, 81 yards, 1 TD

Rushing

- Miami Valley – Kyenes Mincy: 11 att, 75 yards, 0 TD
- Wisconsin – Matt Schabert: 4 att, 15 yards, 0 TD

Receiving

- Miami Valley – Isaiah Cheatham: 2 rec, 49 yards, 0 TD
- Wisconsin – T Fitch: 4 rec, 31 yards, 1 TD

=== Week 11: vs. Chicago Cardinals ===
Week 11: Chicago Cardinals at Wisconsin Wolfpack – Game summary

Quarter	1	2	3	4	Total
Cardinals	0	6	0	14	20
Wolfpack	13	14	19	12	58

at Hartmeyer Arena, Madison, Wisconsin

- Date: May 22
- Game time: 7:30 p.m. CDT

Game information

1st quarter

- Wisconsin – (8:57) Eric Donoval 7–yard pass from Matt Schabert (Tony Smidl rush failed), Wisconsin 6–0
- Wisconsin - (2:45) Marcus Lewis 31-yard pass from Matt Schabert (Tony Smidl kick), Wisconsin 13-0

2nd quarter

- Wisconsin - (13:14) Marcus Lewis 7-yard pass from Matt Schabert (Tony Smidl kick), Wisconsin 20-0
- Chicago - (9:58) Simon Chandler 5-yard pass from Ron Ricciardi (Julie Harshbarger kick failed), Wisconsin 20-6
- Wisconsin – (5:45) Eric Donoval 3–yard rush (Tony Smidl kick), Wisconsin 27–6

3rd quarter

- Wisconsin – (11:58) Eric Donoval 4–yard pass from Matt Schabert (Tony Smidl kick), Wisconsin 34–6
- Wisconsin – (7:34) Matt Schabert 2–yard rush (Tony Smidl kick failed), Wisconsin 40–6
- Wisconsin - (1:15) Marques Johnson 20-yard pass from Matt Schabert (Tony Smidl kick failed), Wisconsin 46-6

4th quarter

- Chicago - (13:10) Mike Hayden 3-yard rush (Ron Ricciardi pass failed), Wisconsin 46-12
- Chicago - (8:34) Shawn McKeown 23-yard pass from Ron Ricciardi (Ron Ricciardi pass to Brian Tait), Wisconsin 46-20
- Wisconsin – (6:55) Mark Mashburn 25–yard kickoff return (Tony Smidl kick failed), Wisconsin 52–20
- Wisconsin – (0:00) Team Safety, Wisconsin 44–18

Passing

- Wisconsin – Matt Schabert: 15/26, 196 yards, 3 TD
- Chicago – Ron Ricciardi: 10/26, 69 yards, 3 TD

Rushing

- Wisconsin – Eric Donoval: 9 att, 50 yards, 3 TD
- Chicago – P Taylor: 1 att, -1 yards, 0 TD

Receiving

- Wisconsin – Marques Johnson: 6 rec, 112 yards, 1 TD
- Chicago – D Jones: 3 rec, 11 yards, 0 TD

=== Week 12: vs. Cincinnati Commandos ===
Week 12: Cincinnati Commandos at Wisconsin Wolfpack – Game summary

Quarter	1	2	3	4	Total
Commandos	7	0	6	8	21
Wolfpack	0	7	20	18	45

at Hartmeyer Arena, Madison, Wisconsin

- Date: May 29
- Game time: 7:00 p.m. CST

Game information

1st quarter

- Cincinnati – (6:25) Dominick Goodman 2-yard rush (Travis Johnson kick), Cincinnati 7–0

2nd quarter

- Wisconsin – (12:20) Marques Johnson 3-yard pass from Matt Schabert (Tony Smidl kick) 7-7

3rd quarter

- Wisconsin – (8:25) Matt Schabert 1-yard rush (Tony Smidl kick), Wisconsin 14–7
- Cincinnati – (7:01) Dominick Goodman 15-yard rush (Travis Johnson kick failed), Wisconsin 14–13
- Wisconsin – (4:41) Marques Johnson 34-yard pass from Matt Schabert (Tony Smidl kick blocked) Wisconsin 20-13
- Wisconsin – (0:40) Mitchell Moore 15-yard pass from Matt Schabert (Tony Smidl kick) Wisconsin 27-13

4th quarter

- Cincinnati – (11:00) Dominick Goodman 1-yard rush (Dominick Goodman pass to James Frazier), Wisconsin 27–21
- Wisconsin – (7:19) Marques Johnson 15-yard pass from Matt Schabert (Matt Schabert pass failed), Wisconsin 33–21
- Wisconsin – (5:43) Kurt Ware 0-yard fumble recovery (Tony Smidl kick failed), Wisconsin 39–21
- Wisconsin – (0:20) Marques Johnson 5-yard pass from Matt Schabert (Tony Smidl kick failed), Wisconsin 45–21

Passing

- Wisconsin – Matt Schabert: 18/23, 128 yards, 5 TD
- Cincinnati – Dominick Goodman: 7/12, 26 yards, 0 TD

Rushing

- Wisconsin – Matt Schabert: 1 att, 10 yards, 1 TD
- Cincinnati – Dominick Goodman: 22 att, 90 yards, 3 TD

Receiving

- Wisconsin – Marques Johnson: 5 rec, 64 yards, 4 TD
- Cincinnati – Johnny Long: 3 rec, 17 yards, 0 TD

=== Week 13: vs. Marion Mayhem ===
Week 13: Wisconsin Wolfpack at Marion Mayhem – Game summary

Quarter	1	2	3	4	Total
Wolfpack	2	0	0	0	2
Mayhem	0	0	0	0	0

- Date: June 5
- Game time: 7:30 p.m. EST

Game information

Marion Forfeit

== Playoffs ==
=== Semifinals: vs. Wisconsin Wolfpack ===
Semifinals: Fort Wayne FireHawks at Wisconsin Wolfpack – Game summary

Quarter	1	2	3	4	Total
FireHawks	12	6	0	6	24
Wolfpack	6	6	7	6	25

at Hartmeyer Arena, Madison, Wisconsin

- Date: June 19
- Game time: 7:00 p.m. CST

Game information

1st quarter

- Fort Wayne – (7:40) Kota-Carone Colors 1-yard rush (John Rocholl kick failed), Fort Wayne 6–0
- Wisconsin – (4:30) Marcus Lewis 3-yard pass from Matt Schabert (Tony Smidl kick failed), 6–6
- Fort Wayne – (2:14) Victor Tolbert 14-yard rush (Kota-Carone Colors pass failed), Fort Wayne 12–6

2nd quarter

- Wisconsin – (12:52) Marcus Lewis 4-yard pass from Matt Schabert (Tony Smidl kick blocked), 12–12
- Fort Wayne – (0:08) Victor Tolbert 3-yard rush (John Rocholl kick failed), Fort Wayne 18–12

3rd quarter

- Wisconsin – (2:25) Marques Johnson 2-yard pass from Matt Schabert (Tony Smidl kick) Wisconsin 19–18

4th quarter

- Wisconsin – (11:22) Matt Schabert 2-yard rush (Tony Smidl kick failed), Wisconsin 25–18
- Fort Wayne – (6:58) Kota-Carone Colors 11-yard rush (John Rocholl kick blocked), Wisconsin 25–24

Passing

- Wisconsin – Matt Schabert: 12/23, 107 yards, 3 TD
- Fort Wayne – Kota-Carone Colors: 5/16, 35 yards, 0 TD

Rushing

- Wisconsin – Matt Schabert: 8 att, 22 yards, 1 TD
- Fort Wayne – Victor Tolbert: 13 att, 53 yards, 2 TD

Receiving

- Wisconsin – Marcus Lewis: 8 rec, 77 yards, 2 TD
- Fort Wayne – Brandon Williams: 2 rec, 20 yards, 0 TD

=== CIFL Championship Game: vs. Cincinnati Commandos ===
CIFL Championship Game: Wisconsin Wolfpack at Cincinnati Commandos – Game summary

Quarter	1	2	3	4	Total
Wolfpack	7	7	12	14	40
Commandos	14	6	20	14	54

at Cincinnati Gardens, Cincinnati, Ohio

- Date: June 26
- Game time: 8:00 p.m. EDT
- Game attendance: 2,758

Game information

1st quarter

- Cincinnati - (13:55) Greg Moore 5-yard rush (Travis Johnson rush failed), Cincinnati 6-0
- Wisconsin – (10:11) Marcus Lewis 2-yard pass from Matt Schabert (Tony Smidl kick), Wisconsin 7–6
- Cincinnati - (4:39) Tony Cornett 0-yard fumble recovery (Ben Mauk pass to Ray Jackson), Cincinnati 14-7

2nd quarter

- Cincinnati – (5:04) Brandon Boehm 10-yard pass from Ben Mauk (Brandon Boehm rush failed), Cincinnati 20–7
- Wisconsin – (0:00) Marcus Lewis 1-yard pass from Matt Schabert (Tony Smidl kick), Cincinnati 20–14
- Cincinnati - (1:55) Dominick Goodman 11-yard pass from Ben Mauk (Travis Johnson kick blocked), Cincinnati 13-6

3rd quarter

- Wisconsin – (12:17) Brandon Wogoman 7-yard pass from Matt Schabert (Tony Smidl kick), Wisconsin 21–20
- Cincinnati - (9:48) Robert Redd 27-yard pass from Ben Mauk (Ray Jackson rush), Cincinnati 28-21
- Wisconsin – (6:23) Tony Smidl 35-yard field goal, Cincinnati 28–24
- Cincinnati - (6:08) Ray Jackson 48-yard kickoff return (Brandon Boehm rush failed), Cincinnati 34-24
- Cincinnati - (1:19) Brandon Boehm 29-yard pass from Ben Mauk (Ben Mauk rush fumbled), Cincinnati 40-24
- Wisconsin – (1:19) Kurt Ware PAT return, Cincinnati 40–26

4th quarter

- Wisconsin – (12:53) Brandon Wogoman 12-yard pass from Matt Schabert (Tony Smidl kick), Cincinnati 40–33
- Cincinnati - (8:54) Greg Moore 12-yard pass from Ben Mauk (Travis Johnson kick), Cincinnati 47-33
- Wisconsin – (1:22) Marcus Lewis 5-yard pass from Matt Schabert (Tony Smidl kick), Cincinnati 47–40
- Cincinnati - (0:32) Greg Moore 1-yard rush (Travis Johnson kick), Cincinnati 54-40

Passing

- Wisconsin – Matt Schabert: 23/37, 214 yards, 5 TD
- Cincinnati – Ben Mauk: 18/29, 195 yards, 4 TD

Rushing

- Wisconsin – Matt Schabert: 2 att, 5 yards, 0 TD
- Cincinnati – Greg Moore: 18 att, 58 yards, 2 TD

Receiving

- Wisconsin – Brandon Wogoman: 14 rec, 151 yards, 2 TD
- Cincinnati – Robert Redd: 8 rec, 122 yards, 1 TD
