= 2010 Miami Valley Silverbacks season =

- Head coach: Brian Wells
- Home stadium: Travel Team

Results
- Record: 4-6
- League place: 4th
- Playoffs: Lost Semifinals 24-48 (Commandos)

The 2010 Miami Valley Silverbacks season was the fifth season for the Continental Indoor Football League (CIFL) franchise. The 2010 Silverbacks announced they will continue play in the CIFL as a full travel squad. The team named former Cincinnati Swarm (af2), Louisville Fire (af2) and Cincinnati Marshals (NIFL) assistant Brian Wells as head coach. The 2010 Silverbacks finished the regular season with, at the time, the best winning percentage in team history (.400) and their second ever playoff berth. Wells was awarded CIFL Co-Coach of the year along with Commandos Head Coach Billy Back. The Silverbacks were eliminated in the first round by the eventual CIFL Champion Cincinnati Commandos.

== Standings ==
2010 Continental Indoor Football League
Team	W	L	T	PCT	PF	PA	PF (Avg.)	PA (Avg.)	STK
Cincinnati Commandos-y	9	1	0	.900	493	294	49.3	29.4	L1
Wisconsin Wolfpack-x	8	2	0	.800	345	213	34.5	21.3	W3
Fort Wayne FireHawks-x	6	4	0	.600	294	267	36.75	33.375	W2
Miami Valley Silverbacks-x	4	6	0	.400	309	354	34.33	39.33	W1
Marion Mayhem	3	7	0	.300	202	193	33.67	32.16	L5
Chicago Cardinals	0	10	0	.000	205	525	20.5	52.5	L10

== Schedule ==
Week	Date	Opponent	Home/Away	Result
1	March 13	Cincinnati Commandos	Away	L, 26-53
2		Bye	Week	
3		Bye	Week	
4	April 3	Wisconsin Wolfpack	Away	L, 32-38
5	April 10	Fort Wayne Firehawks	Away	L, 28-44
6	April 17	Chicago Cardinals	Away	W, 46-29
7	April 24	Cincinnati Commandos	Away	L, 50-58
8	May 1	Marion Mayhem	Away	L, 39-64
9	May 9	Fort Wayne Firehawks	Away	L, 8-26
10	May 15	Wisconsin Wolfpack	Away	W, 22-18
11		Bye	Week	
12	May 29	Chicago Cardinals	Away	W, 58-24
13		Bye	Week	
14	June 12	Marion Mayhem	Away	W, 2-0 FORFEIT

== Playoff Schedule ==
Week	Date	Opponent	Home/Away	Result
Semifinals	June 18	Cincinnati Commandos	Away - (Playoffs)	L, 24-48

== Roster ==
2010 Miami Valley Silverbacks roster
Quarterbacks: 12 Chris Stanford; Offensive backs: 2 Derrick Moss; Receivers: 8 Melvin Bryant; 27 Isaiah Cheatham; 15 Aric Evans; 1 Daniel Stover	Offensive linemen: 78 Richard Bailey; 72 Josh Ellison; 62 Rob Feliciano; 97 Eric Starks; Defensive linemen: 98 Derrick Crawford; 47 Raymond Huff; 99 Luke Scarborough	Linebackers: 42 Larry Byndon; 36 Will White; Defensive backs: 6 Antonio Carver; 19 Austin Goss; 21 Tiron Jones; 10 Brandon Martin; 4 Tommy Sewell; Kickers: 17 Jason Cunningham	Inactive: currently vacant; Injured reserve: 3 Kyenes Mincy QB; Updated June 18, 2010 rookies in italics 21 Active, 1 Inactive

== Stats ==
=== Passing ===
Player	Comp.	Att.	Comp%	Yards	TD's	INT's	Rating
Kyenes Mincy	41	102	40.2%	544	15	6	87.7
Shaun Kirby	24	60	40%	245	6	6	87.5
Antonio Davis	11	27	40.7%	130	1	3	88.1
Chris Stanford	16	25	64%	225	8	0	147.1

=== Rushing ===
Player	Car.	Yards	Avg.	TD's	Long
Kyenes Mincy	41	244	6	4	24
Derrick Moss	63	214	3.4	4	26
Adell Givens	28	57	2	2	13
Shaun Kirby	14	55	3.9	1	19

=== Receiving ===
Player	Rec.	Yards	Avg.	TD's	Long
Melvin Bryant	27	544	10.9	5	27
Daniel Stover	22	346	15.7	10	43
Kyenes Mincy	10	119	11.9	3	31
Derrick Moss	9	50	5.6	2	14

== Regular season ==
=== Week 1: vs. Cincinnati Commandos ===
Week 1: Miami Valley Silverbacks at Cincinnati Commandos – Game summary

Quarter	1	2	3	4	Total
Silverbacks	6	20	0	0	26
Commandos	0	21	13	19	53

at Cincinnati Gardens, Cincinnati, Ohio

- Date: March 13
- Game time: 7:00 p.m. EDT
- Game attendance: 5,490

Game information

1st quarter

- Miami valley – (12:24) Derrick Moss 4-yard rush (Austin Goss kick failed), Miami Valley 6–0

2nd quarter

- Miami valley – (13:09) Adell Givens 3-yard rush (Antonio Davis pass failed), Miami Valley 12–0
- Cincinnati - (9:43) Robert Redd 18-yard pass from Ben Mauk (Travis Johnson kick), Miami Valley 12-7
- Miami valley – (5:33) Derrick Moss 8-yard rush (Adell Givens rush), Miami Valley 20–7
- Cincinnati - (2:29) Dominick Goodman 2-yard pass from Ben Mauk (Travis Johnson kick), Miami Valley 20-14
- Miami valley – (0:40) Daniel Stover 13-yard pass from Antonio Davis (Derrick Moss rush failed), Miami Valley 26–14
- Cincinnati – (0:31) Ray Jackson 1-yard rush (Travis Johnson kick), Miami Valley 26–21

3rd quarter

- Cincinnati - (11:16) Robert Redd 1-yard pass from Ben Mauk (Travis Johnson kick failed), Cincinnati 27-26
- Cincinnati - (1:05) Greg Moore 1-yard rush (Travis Johnson kick), Cincinnati 34-26

4th quarter

- Cincinnati - (14:43) Jeff Franklin 12-yard interception return (Travis Johnson pass failed), Cincinnati 40-26
- Cincinnati – (9:40) Ray Jackson 20-yard rush (Travis Johnson kick), Cincinnati 47–26
- Cincinnati - (4:58) Dominick Goodman 45-yard pass from Ben Mauk (Travis Johnson kick failed), Cincinnati 53-26

Passing

- Miami valley – Antonio Davis: 11/27, 130 yards, 1 TD
- Cincinnati – Ben Mauk: 11/16, 111 yards, 4 TD

Rushing

- Miami valley – Derrick Moss: 6 att, 21 yards, 2 TD
- Cincinnati – Ray Jackson: 7 att, 52 yards, 2 TD

Receiving

- Miami valley – Daniel Stover: 4 rec, 52 yards, 1 TD
- Cincinnati – Dominick Goodman: 4 rec, 50 yards, 2 TD

=== Week 4: vs. Wisconsin Wolfpack ===
Week 4: Miami Valley Silverbacks at Wisconsin Wolfpack – Game summary

Quarter	1	2	3	4	Total
Silverbacks	0	6	12	14	32
Wolfpack	12	6	7	13	38

at Hartmeyer Arena, Madison, Wisconsin

- Date: April 3
- Game time: 7:30 p.m. CDT
- Game attendance: 1,484
- Referee: Tommy Tyks Umpire: Paul Black Linesman: Rich Klein Line judge: PJ way Back judge: Mark Thompson

Game information

1st quarter

- Wisconsin – (10:45) Marcus Lewis 4-yard pass Brian Ryczkowski (Tony Smidl kick failed), Wisconsin 6–0
- Wisconsin – (4:20) Marques Johnson 10-yard pass from Brian Ryczkowski (Marques Johnson pass failed), Wisconsin 12–0

2nd quarter

- Miami valley – (0:14) Derrick Moss 9-yard pass from Shaun Kirby (Shaun Kirby rush failed), Wisconsin 12–6
- Wisconsin – (0:01) Eric Donoval 1-yard rush (Eric Donoval rush failed), Wisconsin 18–6

3rd quarter

- Miami valley – (9:23) Derrick Moss 14-yard pass from Shaun Kirby (Shaun Kirby rush failed), Wisconsin 18–12
- Wisconsin – (7:04) Eric Donoval 2-yard rush (Tony Smidl kick), Shaun Kirby kick blocked), Wisconsin 25–18

4th quarter

- Miami valley – (14:50) Raymond Huff safety, Wisconsin 25–20
- Miami valley – (12:08) Daniel Stover 18-yard pass from Shaun Kirby (Derrick Moss rush failed), Miami Valley 26–25
- Wisconsin – (10:26) Eric Donoval 1-yard rush (Shane Alder pass failed), Wisconsin 31–26
- Wisconsin – (7:47) Calvin Thomas 3-yard pass from Shane Alder (Tony Smidl kick), Wisconsin 38–26
- Miami valley – (4:32) Shaun Kirby 19-yard rush (Shaun Kirby pass failed), Wisconsin 38–32

Passing

- Miami valley – Shaun Kirby: 14/32, 131 yards, 4 TD
- Wisconsin – Brian Ryczkowski: 5/10, 46 yards, 2 TD

Rushing

- Miami valley – Shaun Kirby: 8 att, 37 yards, 1 TD
- Wisconsin – Eric Donoval: 12 att, 53 yards, 3 TD

Receiving

- Miami valley – Daniel Stover: 4 rec, 57 yards, 1 TD
- Wisconsin – Marques Johnson: 3 rec, 54 yards, 1 TD

=== Week 5: vs. Fort Wayne FireHawks ===
Week 5: Miami Valley Silverbacks at Fort Wayne FireHawks – Game summary

Quarter	1	2	3	4	Total
Silverbacks	6	8	6	8	28
FireHawks	20	6	6	12	44

at Allen County War Memorial Coliseum, Fort Wayne, Indiana

- Date: April 10
- Game time: 7:00 p.m. EDT
- Game attendance: 1,954

Game information

1st quarter

- Fort wayne – (14:05) Justin Wynn 31-yard pass from Kota-Carone Colors (Chris Kolokithas pass failed), Fort Wayne 6–0
- Fort wayne – (6:42) Justin Wynn 4-yard pass from Kota-Carone Colors (Kota-Carone Colors rush), Fort Wayne 14–0
- Miami valley – (5:11) Kyenes Mincy 26-yard pass from Shaun Kirby (Shaun Kirby kick failed), Fort Wayne 14–6
- Fort wayne – (00:33) Justin Wynn 7-yard pass from Kota-Carone Colors (Katie Hnida kick failed), Fort Wayne 20–6

2nd quarter

- Fort wayne – (5:32) Justin Wynn 31-yard pass from Kota-Carone Colors (Kota-Carone Colors pass failed), Fort Wayne 26–6
- Miami valley – (0:59) Derrick Moss 1-yard rush (Adell Givens rush), Fort Wayne 26–14

3rd quarter

- Fort wayne – (11:30) Justin Wynn 45-yard pass from Kota-Carone Colors (Katie Hnida kick failed), Fort Wayne 32–14
- Miami valley – (8:11) Kyenes Mincy 1-yard pass from Shaun Kirby (Shaun Kirby rush failed), Fort Wayne 32–20

4th quarter

- Fort wayne – (8:14) Brandon Walker-Roby 10-yard pass from Kota-Carone Colors (Chris Kolokithas rush failed), Fort Wayne 38–20
- Miami valley – (2:45) Adell Givens 1-yard rush (Austin Goss pass from Shaun Kirby), Fort Wayne 38–28
- Fort wayne – (0:39) Jermaine Woolfolk 29-yard pass from Kota-Carone Colors (Kota-Carone Colors pass failed), Fort Wayne 44–28

Passing

- Miami valley – Shaun Kirby: 10/28, 114 yards, 2 TD
- Fort wayne – Kota-Carone Colors: 17/30, 200 yards, 7 TD

Rushing

- Miami valley – Shaun Kirby: 6 att, 18 yards, 0 TD
- Fort wayne – Kota-Carone Colors: 8 att, 49 yards, 0 TD

Receiving

- Miami valley – Daniel Stover: 4 rec, 44 yards, 0 TD
- Fort wayne – Justin Wynn: 7 rec, 114 yards, 4 TD

=== Week 6: vs. Chicago Cardinals ===
Week 6: Miami Valley Silverbacks at Chicago Cardinals – Game summary

Quarter	1	2	3	4	Total
Silverbacks	12	12	8	14	46
Cardinals	6	0	16	7	29

at Odeum Expo Center, Villa Park, Illinois

- Date: April 17
- Game time: 7:30 p.m. CDT

Game information

1st quarter

- Miami valley – (9:35) Daniel Stover 43-yard pass from Kyenes Mincy (Dale Golsby kick failed), Miami Valley 6–0
- Chicago – (8:42) Brandon Wogoman 36-yard pass from Will Ducey (P Taylor rush failed), 6–6
- Miami valley – (2:47) Daniel Stover 6-yard pass from Kyenes Mincy (Kyenes Mincy pass failed), Miami Valley 12–6

2nd quarter

- Miami valley – (7:35) Kyenes Mincy 17-yard rush (Kyenes Mincy pass failed), Miami Valley 18–6
- Miami valley – (2:22) Kyenes Mincy 19-yard rush (Kyenes Mincy kick failed), Miami Valley 24–6

3rd quarter

- Chicago – (12:18) P Taylor 6-yard rush (Brandon Wogoman rush), Miami Valley 24–14
- Miami valley – (9:43) Daniel Stover 30-yard pass from Kyenes Mincy (Kyenes Mincy pass to Adell Givens), Miami Valley 32–14
- Chicago – (6:42) Alex Nunez 34-yard pass from Will Ducey (Brandon Wogoman rush), Miami Valley 32–22

4th quarter

- Miami valley – (6:37) Daniel Stover 26-yard pass from Kyenes Mincy (Kyenes Mincy pass to Melvin Bryant), Miami Valley 40–22
- Miami valley – (0:46) Melvin Bryant 23-yard pass from Kyenes Mincy (Dale Golsby rush failed), Miami Valley 46–22
- Chicago – (0:29) Shawn McKeown 20-yard pass from Will Ducey (Julie Harsbarger kick), Miami Valley 46–29

Passing

- Miami valley – Kyenes Mincy: 8/16, 155 yards, 5 TD
- Chicago – Will Ducey: 9/25, 159 yards, 3 TD

Rushing

- Miami valley – Kyenes Mincy: 8 att, 77 yards, 2 TD
- Chicago – Will Ducey: 4 att, 9 yards, 0 TD

Receiving

- Miami valley – Daniel Stover: 4 rec, 105 yards, 4 TD
- Chicago – Shawn McKeown: 4 rec, 52 yards, 1 TD

=== Week 7: vs. Cincinnati Commandos ===
Week 7: Miami Valley Silverbacks at Cincinnati Commandos – Game summary

Quarter	1	2	3	4	Total
Silverbacks	0	6	20	24	50
Commandos	18	14	18	8	58

at Cincinnati Gardens, Cincinnati, Ohio

- Date: April 24
- Game time: 7:00 p.m. EDT

Game information

1st quarter

- Cincinnati - (12:31) Robert Redd 4-yard pass from Ben Mauk (Ray Jackson rush failed), Cincinnati 6-0
- Cincinnati - (6:05) Dominick Goodman 1-yard pass from Ben Mauk (Ben Mauk pass failed), Cincinnati 12-0
- Cincinnati – (1:16) Ben Mauk 12-yard rush (Ben Mauk pass failed), Cincinnati 18–0

2nd quarter

- Cincinnati - (6:01) Brandon Boehm 2-yard pass from Ben Mauk (Greg Moore rush failed), Cincinnati 24-0
- Miami valley – (3:07) Adell Givens 12-yard pass from Kyenes Mincy (Kyenes Mincy rush failed), Cincinnati 24–6
- Cincinnati - (0:43) Robert Redd 2-yard pass from Ben Mauk (Ben Mauk pass to Dominick Goodman), Cincinnati 32-6

3rd quarter

- Miami valley – (14:49) Adell Givens 50-yard kickoff return (Derrick Moss rush failed), Cincinnati 32–12
- Cincinnati - (12:06) Robert Redd 6-yard pass from Ben Mauk (Ben Mauk pass failed), Cincinnati 38-12
- Miami valley – (7:57) Melvin Bryant 1-yard pass from Kyenes Mincy (Kyenes Mincy pass to Daniel Stover), Cincinnati 38–20
- Cincinnati - (5:37) Brandon Boehm 31-yard pass from Ben Mauk (Ben Mauk rush failed), Cincinnati 44-20
- Miami valley – (3:20) Daniel Stover 29-yard pass from Kyenes Mincy (Kyenes Mincy pass failed), Cincinnati 44–26
- Cincinnati - (0:01) Dominick Goodman 1-yard rush (Robert Redd rush failed), Cincinnati 50-26

4th quarter

- Miami valley – (10:01) Aric Evans 19-yard pass from Kyenes Mincy (Kyenes Mincy pass to Daniel Stover), Cincinnati 50–34
- Miami valley – (7:00) Team Safety, Cincinnati 50–36
- Miami valley – (2:35) Daniel Stover 4-yard pass from Kyenes Mincy (Kyenes Mincy pass to Daniel Stover), Cincinnati 50–44
- Cincinnati - (1:14) Robert Redd 34-yard pass from Ben Mauk (Greg Moore rush), Cincinnati 58-44
- Miami valley – (0:40) Kyenes Mincy 24-yard rush (Kyenes Mincy rush failed), Cincinnati 58–50

Passing

- Miami valley – Kyenes Mincy: 10/24, 102 yards, 5 TD
- Cincinnati – Ben Mauk: 14/18, 148 yards, 7 TD

Rushing

- Miami valley – Kyenes Mincy: 7 att, 37 yards, 1 TD
- Cincinnati – Greg Moore: 4 att, 34 yards, 0 TD

Receiving

- Miami valley – Melvin Bryant: 5 rec, 47 yards, 1 TD
- Cincinnati – Brandon Boehm: 4 rec, 61 yards, 2 TD

=== Week 8: vs. Marion Mayhem ===
Week 8: Miami Valley Silverbacks at Marion Mayhem – Game summary

Quarter	1	2	3	4	Total
Silverbacks	6	15	0	18	39
Mayhem	13	14	10	27	64

at Veterans Memorial Coliseum, Marion, Ohio

- Date: May 1
- Game time: 7:30 p.m. EDT
- Game attendance: 1,312

Game information

1st quarter

- Marion – (9:04) Victor Tolbert 4-yard pass from Josh Davis (John Sims kick failed), Marion 6–0
- Miami valley – (5:30) Eric Morton 36-yard pass from Kyenes Mincy (Kyenes Mincy rush failed), 6–6
- Marion – (1:49) Victor Tolbert 4-yard rush (John Sims kick), Marion 13–6

2nd quarter

- Miami valley – (11:04) Melvin Bryant 2-yard pass from Kyenes Mincy (Kyenes Mincy rush), Miami Valley 14–13
- Marion – (7:24) Victor Tolbert 2-yard rush (John Sims kick), Marion 20–14
- Marion – (0:57) Victor Tolbert 5-yard pass from Josh Davis (John Sims kick), Marion 27–14
- Miami valley – (0:47) Derrick Moss 53-yard kickoff return (Austin Goss), Marion 27–21

3rd quarter

- Marion – (13:29) Josh Davis 4-yard rush (John Sims kick), Marion 34–21
- Marion – (3:21) John Sims 18-yard field goal, Marion 37–21

4th quarter

- Miami valley – (14:45) Daniel Stover 28-yard pass from Kyenes Mincy (Kyenes Mincy pass failed), Marion 37–27
- Marion – (12:40) Victor Tolbert 17-yard rush (Maurice Douse rush), Marion 45–27
- Miami valley – (10:04) Kyenes Mincy 12-yard rush (Kyenes Mincy pass failed), Marion 45–33
- Marion – (7:48) Maurice Douse 8-yard rush (John Sims kick failed), Marion 51–33
- Marion – (1:26) Victor Tolbert 42-yard rush (John Sims kick failed), Marion 57–33
- Marion – (0:26) Aric Evans 18-yard pass from Kyenes Mincy (Kyenes Mincy rush failed), Marion 57–39
- Marion – (0:21) Brandon Price 3-yard kickoff return (J.T. Haynes kick), Marion 64–39

Passing

- Miami valley – Kyenes Mincy: 7/18, 98 yards, 4 TD
- Marion – Josh Davis: 10/13, 110 yards, 2 TD

Rushing

- Miami valley – Kyenes Mincy: 5 att, 39 yards, 1 TD
- Marion – Victor Tolbert: 11 att, 109 yards, 4 TD

Receiving

- Miami valley – Daniel Stover: 2 rec, 30 yards, 1 TD
- Marion – Mark Hudleton: 4 rec, 29 yards, 0 TD

=== Week 9: vs. Fort Wayne FireHawks ===
Week 9: Miami Valley Silverbacks at Fort Wayne FireHawks – Game summary

Quarter	1	2	3	4	Total
Silverbacks	0	0	8	0	8
FireHawks	7	7	6	6	26

at Allen County War Memorial Coliseum, Fort Wayne, Indiana

- Date: May 9
- Game time: 1:00 p.m. EST
- Game attendance: 1,353

Game information

1st quarter

- Fort wayne – (5:36) Zack Rainey 25-yard pass from Kota-Carone Colors (Brian Clawson kick), Fort Wayne 7–0

2nd quarter

- Fort wayne – (13:00) Tramaine Billie 3-yard rush (Brian Clawson kick), Fort Wayne 14–0

3rd quarter

- Fort wayne – (6:28) Tramaine Billie 6-yard rush (Brian Clawson kick failed), Fort Wayne 20–0
- Miami valley – (1:45) Aric Evans 16-yard pass from Chris Stanford (Larry Byndon pass from Chris Stanford), Fort Wayne 20–8

4th quarter

- Fort wayne – (8:50) Tramaine Billie 0-yard blocked field goal return (Mike Whitaker pass failed), Fort Wayne 26–8

Passing

- Miami valley – Kyenes Mincy: 10/25, 118 yards, 0 TD
- Fort wayne – Kota-Carone Colors: 10/15, 99 yards, 1 TD

Rushing

- Miami valley – Kyenes Mincy: 8 att, 17 yards, 0 TD
- Fort wayne – Justin Wynn: 1 att, 12 yards, 0 TD

Receiving

- Miami valley – Melvin Bryant: 5 rec, 44 yards, 0 TD
- Fort wayne – Zack Rainey: 5 rec, 54 yards, 1 TD

=== Week 10: vs. Wisconsin Wolfpack ===
Week 10: Miami Valley Silverbacks at Wisconsin Wolfpack – Game summary

Quarter	1	2	3	4	Total
Silverbacks	0	7	7	8	22
Wolfpack	6	6	6	0	18

at Hartmeyer Arena, Madison, Wisconsin

- Date: May 15
- Game time: 7:30 p.m. CDT
- Game attendance: 113
- Referee: Jim Bernardi Umpire: Chuck Poynter Linesman: Chad Davis Line judge: PJ Way Back judge: Aaron Link

Game information

1st quarter

- Wisconsin – (0:10) T Fitch 4-yard pass Matt Schabert (Tony Smidl kick failed), Wisconsin 6–0

2nd quarter

- Wisconsin – (6:49) Eric Donoval 4-yard rush (Tony Smidl failed), Wisconsin 12–0
- Miami valley – (0:00) Derrick Moss 1-yard rush (Jason Cunningham kick), Wisconsin 12–7

3rd quarter

- Miami valley – (5:41) Aric Evans 9-yard pass from Kyenes Mincy (Jason Cunningham kick), Miami Valley 14–12
- Wisconsin – (2:16) Eric Donoval 4-yard rush (Matt Schabert drop-kick failed), Wisconsin 18–14

4th quarter

- Miami valley – (11:07) Team safety, Wisconsin 18–16
- Miami valley – (0:00) Derrick Crawford 14-yard miss field goal return (none attempted), Miami Valley 22–18

Passing

- Miami valley – Kyenes Mincy: 5/18, 67 yards, 1 TD
- Wisconsin – Matt Schabert: 11/22, 81 yards, 1 TD

Rushing

- Miami valley – Kyenes Mincy: 11 att, 75 yards, 0 TD
- Wisconsin – Matt Schabert: 4 att, 15 yards, 0 TD

Receiving

- Miami valley – Isaiah Cheatham: 2 rec, 49 yards, 0 TD
- Wisconsin – T Fitch: 4 rec, 31 yards, 1 TD

=== Week 12: vs. Chicago Cardinals ===
Week 12: Miami Valley Silverbacks at Chicago Cardinals – Game summary

Quarter	1	2	3	4	Total
Silverbacks	20	12	12	14	58
Cardinals	6	0	12	6	24

at Odeum Expo Center, Villa Park, Illinois

- Date: May 29
- Game time: 7:30 p.m. CDT

Game information

1st quarter

- Miami valley – (14:07) Chris Stanford 12-yard fumble recovery (Kyenes Mincy pass to Will White), Miami Valley 8–0
- Miami valley – (9:07) Isaiah Cheatham 45-yard rush (Jason Cunningham kick failed), Miami Valley 14–0
- Chicago – (6:29) Brian Tait 12-yard pass from Ron Ricciardi (Julie Harshbarger kick failed), Miami Valley 14–6
- Miami valley – (00:42) Chris Stanford 1-yard rush (Chris Stanford pass failed), Miami Valley 20–6

2nd quarter

- Miami valley – (6:30) Aric Evans 13-yard pass from Chris Stanford (Jason Cunningham kick blocked), Miami Valley 26–6
- Miami valley – (2:34) Derrick Crawford 11-yard blocked field goal return (Jason Cunningham kick blocked), Miami Valley 32–6

3rd quarter

- Miami valley – (12:27) Isaiah Cheatham 5-yard rush (Larry Byndon pass failed), Miami Valley 38–6
- Chicago – (10:09) Adrain Herry 5-yard fumble recovery (Ron Ricciardi pass failed), Miami Valley 38–12
- Miami valley – (6:16) Eric Starks 4-yard pass from Chris Stanford (Chris Stanford rush failed), Miami Valley 44–12
- Chicago – (1:35) Shawn McKeown 11-yard pass from Ron Ricciardi (Ron Ricciardi pass failed), Miami Valley 44–18

4th quarter

- Miami valley – (13:41) Aric Evans 45-yard pass from Chris Stanford (Jason Cunningham kick), Miami Valley 51–18
- Miami valley – (5:44) Melvin Bryant 20-yard pass from Chris Stanford (Jason Cunningham kick), Miami Valley 58–18
- Chicago – (2:00) Scott Dupart 1-yard rush (Julie Harshbarger kick failed), Miami Valley 58–24

Passing

- Miami valley – Chris Stanford: 6/6, 120 yards, 4 TD
- Chicago – Ron Ricciardi: 12/28, 108 yards, 2 TD

Rushing

- Miami valley – Isaiah Cheatham: 2 att, 50 yards, 2 TD
- Chicago – Dino Cardone: 1 att, 14 yards, 0 TD

Receiving

- Miami valley – Melvin Bryant: 4 rec, 62 yards, 1 TD
- Chicago – James Jones: 4 rec, 47 yards, 0 TD

=== Week 14: vs. Marion Mayhem ===
Week 14: Miami Valley Silverbacks at Marion Mayhem – Game summary

Quarter	1	2	3	4	Total
Silverbacks	2	0	0	0	2
Mayhem	0	0	0	0	0

- Date: June 12
- Game time: 7:30 p.m. EST

Game information

Marion Forfeit
