= 2010 Chicago Cardinals season =

CIFL season

- Head coach: John Burns
- Home stadium: Odeum Expo Center; 1033 North Villa Avenue; Villa Park, IL 60181

Results
- Record: 0-10
- League place: 6th
- Playoffs: did not qualify

The 2010 Chicago Cardinals season was the third season for the Continental Indoor Football League (CIFL) franchise, but the team's first as the Chicago Cardinals after relocating from Milwaukee where they were known as the Milwaukee Bonecrushers. The Cardinals were able to finish the season with an 0-10 record, and failed to qualify for the playoffs. The Cardinals replaced the Slaughter in the CIFL, after the Slaughter left that league for the IFL due to a dispute with CIFL management. The Cardinals were formerly known as the Milwaukee Bonecrushers, also of the CIFL, and relocated to Villa Park in 2010. The Cardinals use their name with permission from the original National Football League team, now known as the Arizona Cardinals.

The Cardinals only season was one of utter disappointment. After starting 0-2, they signed Kicker Julie Harshbarger, the 2nd female Kicker in the CIFL history. (The other being Katie Hnida of the Fort Wayne FireHawks) After a successful soccer career at Benedictine University and Rockford College, where she was named to several all-conference teams. While Harshbarger was not the first woman to score a point in an indoor football game, she was the first woman ever to score a field goal in an indoor football game. After a 20-58 loss on May 22, and seeing their record drop to 0-8, the Cardinals let several of their best players, including the All-Purpose Player of the Year (Brandon Wogoman), leave the team for the nearby, and contending, Wisconsin Wolfpack.

== Standings ==
2010 Continental Indoor Football League
Team	W	L	T	PCT	PF	PA	PF (Avg.)	PA (Avg.)	STK
Cincinnati Commandos-y	9	1	0	.900	493	294	49.3	29.4	L1
Wisconsin Wolfpack-x	8	2	0	.800	345	213	34.5	21.3	W3
Fort Wayne FireHawks-x	6	4	0	.600	294	267	36.75	33.375	W2
Miami Valley Silverbacks-x	4	6	0	.400	309	354	34.33	39.33	W1
Marion Mayhem	3	7	0	.300	202	193	33.67	32.16	L5
Chicago Cardinals	0	10	0	.000	205	525	20.5	52.5	L10

== Schedule ==
=== 2010 season schedule ===
Week	Date	Opponent	Home/Away	Result
1		Bye	Week	
2		Bye	Week	
3		Bye	Week	
4	April 2	Marion Mayhem	Away	Lost 20-60
5	April 10	Marion Mayhem	Home	Lost 14-19
6	April 17	Miami Valley Silverbacks	Home	Lost 29-46
7	April 24	Fort Wayne Firehawks	Away	Lost 45-69
8	May 1	Cincinnati Commandos	Home	Lost 22-62
9	May 8	Wisconsin Wolfpack	Home	Lost 18-44
10	May 15	Cincinnati Commandos	Away	Lost 13-61
11	May 22	Wisconsin Wolfpack	Away	Lost 20-58
12	May 29	Miami Valley Silverbacks	Home	Lost 24-58
13	June 5	Fort Wayne Firehawks	Home	Lost 0-48

== Roster ==
2010 Chicago Cardinals roster
Quarterbacks: 6 Gabriel Baker; 11 Jimmy Morris; 13 Ron Ricciardi; Running backs: 44 Nick Cosentino; 26 Mike Hayden; 14 James Jones; Wide receivers: 3 Tyler Honeck; 45 Shawn McKeown; 28 Brian Tait; 5 Vince Tybor	Offensive linemen: 48 Simon Chandler; 90 Josh Coyle; 88 D Svendsen; Defensive linemen: 93 Adrian Henry; 69 Jaran Rutledge; 94 Jason Wright	Linebackers: 24 Kurt James; 20 Jerry Jones; Defensive backs: 10 Dino Cardone; 15 Scott DuPart; 31 Ricky Emery; 21 Paul Nunoo; Kickers: 95 Julie Harshbarger	Inactive: currently vacant; Injured reserve: currently vacant; Updated June 5, 2010 rookies in italics 23 Active, 0 Inactive

== Stats ==
=== Passing ===
Player	Comp.	Att.	Comp%	Yards	TD's	INT's	Rating
Ron Ricciardi	89	209	42.6%	842	14	20	89.7
Will Ducey	19	49	38.8%	276	4	5	86.5
Alex Nunez	7	15	46.7%	66	1	1	93.1
Gabriel Baker	1	4	25%	20	0	0	79.2

=== Rushing ===
Player	Car.	Yards	Avg.	TD's	Long
Mike Hayden	15	60	4	1	16
P Taylor	22	59	2.7	9	10
Alex Nunez	10	43	4.3	0	13
Brandon Wogoman	12	29	2.4	1	13

=== Receiving ===
Player	Rec.	Yards	Avg.	TD's	Long
Shawn McKeown	32	357	11.2	7	27
Brandon Wogoman	25	301	12	4	36
M Leaks	12	93	7.8	0	12
Alex Nunez	9	122	13.6	3	34

== Regular season ==
=== Week 4: vs. Marion Mayhem ===
Week 4: Chicago Cardinals at Marion Mayhem – Game summary

Quarter	1	2	3	4	Total
Cardinals	13	7	0	0	20
Mayhem	14	13	14	19	60

at Veterans Memorial Coliseum, Marion, Ohio

- Date: April 2
- Game time: 7:30 p.m. EDT
- Game attendance: 1,241

Game information

1st quarter

- Chicago – (12:01) A Chorazy 6-yard rush (J Brown kick), Chicago 7–0
- Marion – (5:45) Victor Tolbert 1-yard rush (Eric Schnatz kick), 7–7
- Chicago – (3:40) Alex Nunez 20-yard pass from Ron Ricciardi (J Brown kick failed), Chicago 13–7
- Marion – (2:11) Maurice Douse 26-yard pass from Josh Davis (Eric Schnatz kick), Marion 14–13

2nd quarter

- Marion – (10:51) Ahmona Maxwell 6-yard blocked field goal return (Eric Schnatz kick failed), Marion 20–13
- Chicago – (6:09) Alex Nunez 4-yard pass from Ron Ricciardi (J Brown kick), 20–20
- Marion – (0:22) Brandon Price 2-yard pass from Josh Davis (Eric Schnatz kick), Marion 27–20

3rd quarter

- Marion – (10:49) Mike Tatum 4-yard pass from Josh Davis (Eric Schnatz kick), Marion 34–20
- Marion – (2:31) Maurice Douse 11-yard pass from Josh Davis (Eric Schnatz kick), Marion 41–20

4th quarter

- Marion – (11:34) Mike Tatum 25-yard pass from Josh Davis (Eric Schnatz kick failed), Marion 47–20
- Marion – (5:34) Mike Cross 0-yard fumble recovery (Eric Schnatz kick), Marion 54–20
- Marion – (0:09) Victor Tolbert 1-yard rush (Eric Schnatz kick failed), 60–20

Passing

- Chicago – Ron Ricciardi: 13/33, 134 yards, 2 TD
- Marion – Josh Davis: 12/21, 148 yards, 5 TD

Rushing

- Chicago – A Chorazy: 5 att, 16 yards, 1 TD
- Marion – Josh Davis: 4 att, 27 yards, 0 TD

Receiving

- Chicago – M Leaks: 5 rec, 36 yards, 0 TD
- Marion – Maurice Douse: 4 rec, 76 yards, 2 TD

=== Week 5: vs. Marion Mayhem ===
Week 5: Marion Mayhem at Chicago Cardinals – Game summary

Quarter	1	2	3	4	Total
Mayhem	13	6	0	0	19
Cardinals	0	14	0	0	14

at Odeum Expo Center, Villa Park, Illinois

- Date: April 10
- Game time: 7:30 p.m. CDT

Game information

1st quarter

- Marion – (11:07) Andre Troy 50-yard blocked field goal return (Eric Schnatz kick), Marion 7–0
- Marion – (1:40) Victor Tolbert 3-yard rush (Eric Schnatz kick failed), Marion 13–0

2nd quarter

- Chicago – (14:45) Brandon Wogoman 1-yard rush (Brandon Wogoman rush failed), Marion 13–6
- Chicago – (13:15) Jaran Rutledge safety, Marion 13–8
- Marion – (12:40) Mike Tatum 14-yard pass from Josh Davis (Eric Schnatz kick failed), Marion 19–8
- Chicago – (10:36) Shawn McKeown 19-yard pass from Ron Ricciardi (Shawn McKeown kick failed), Marion 19–14

3rd quarter
4th quarter

Passing

- Marion – Josh Davis: 14/24, 145 yards, 1 TD
- Chicago – Ron Ricciardi: 9/27, 113 yards, 1 TD

Rushing

- Marion – Josh Davis: 8 att, 16 yards, 0 TD
- Chicago – A Chorazy: 2 att, 6 yards, 0 TD

Receiving

- Marion – Victor Tolbert: 4 rec, 28 yards, 0 TD
- Chicago – M Leaks: 3 rec, 21 yards, 0 TD

=== Week 6: vs. Miami Valley Silverbacks ===
Week 6: Miami Valley Silverbacks at Chicago Cardinals – Game summary

Quarter	1	2	3	4	Total
Silverbacks	12	12	8	14	46
Cardinals	6	0	16	7	29

at Odeum Expo Center, Villa Park, Illinois

- Date: April 17
- Game time: 7:30 p.m. CDT

Game information

1st quarter

- Miami valley – (9:35) Daniel Stover 43-yard pass from Kyenes Mincy (Dale Golsby kick failed), Miami Valley 6–0
- Chicago – (8:42) Brandon Wogoman 36-yard pass from Will Ducey (P Taylor rush failed), 6–6
- Miami valley – (2:47) Daniel Stover 6-yard pass from Kyenes Mincy (Kyenes Mincy pass failed), Miami Valley 12–6

2nd quarter

- Miami valley – (7:35) Kyenes Mincy 17-yard rush (Kyenes Mincy pass failed), Miami Valley 18–6
- Miami valley – (2:22) Kyenes Mincy 19-yard rush (Kyenes Mincy kick failed), Miami Valley 24–6

3rd quarter

- Chicago – (12:18) P Taylor 6-yard rush (Brandon Wogoman rush), Miami Valley 24–14
- Miami valley – (9:43) Daniel Stover 30-yard pass from Kyenes Mincy (Kyenes Mincy pass to Adell Givens), Miami Valley 32–14
- Chicago – (6:42) Alex Nunez 34-yard pass from Will Ducey (Brandon Wogoman rush), Miami Valley 32–22

4th quarter

- Miami valley – (6:37) Daniel Stover 26-yard pass from Kyenes Mincy (Kyenes Mincy pass to Melvin Bryant), Miami Valley 40–22
- Miami valley – (0:46) Melvin Bryant 23-yard pass from Kyenes Mincy (Dale Golsby rush failed), Miami Valley 46–22
- Chicago – (0:29) Shawn McKeown 20-yard pass from Will Ducey (Julie Harsbarger kick), Miami Valley 46–29

Passing

- Miami valley – Kyenes Mincy: 8/16, 155 yards, 5 TD
- Chicago – Will Ducey: 9/25, 159 yards, 3 TD

Rushing

- Miami valley – Kyenes Mincy: 8 att, 77 yards, 2 TD
- Chicago – Will Ducey: 4 att, 9 yards, 0 TD

Receiving

- Miami valley – Daniel Stover: 4 rec, 105 yards, 4 TD
- Chicago – Shawn McKeown: 4 rec, 52 yards, 1 TD

=== Week 7: vs. Fort Wayne FireHawks ===
Week 7: Chicago Cardinals at Fort Wayne FireHawks – Game summary

Quarter	1	2	3	4	Total
Cardinals	14	14	3	14	45
FireHawks	6	29	6	28	69

at Allen County War Memorial Coliseum, Fort Wayne, Indiana

- Date: April 24
- Game time: 7:00 p.m. EDT
- Game attendance: 2,020

Game information

1st quarter

- Fort wayne – (14:41) Brandon Walker-Roby 50-yard kickoff return (Chad Rollins kick failed), Fort Wayne 6–0
- Chicago – (7:41) Brandon Wogoman 20-yard pass from Ron Ricciardi (Julie Harshbarger kick), Chicago 7–6
- Chicago – (2:20) P Taylor 7-yard pass from Brandon Wogoman (Julie Harshbarger kick), Chicago 14–6

2nd quarter

- Fort wayne – (11:29) Kota-Carone Colors 2-yard rush (Kota-Carone Colors rush), 14–14
- Fort wayne – (9:25) Tramaine Billie 15-yard interception return (Chad Rollins kick), Fort Wayne 21–14
- Chicago – (5:17) P Taylor 5-yard rush (Julie Harshbarger kick failed), Fort Wayne 21–20
- Chicago – (2:35) P Taylor 3-yard rush (P Taylor rush), Chicago 28–21
- Fort wayne – (0:54) Kota-Carone Colors rush (Chad Rollins kick failed), Chicago 28–27
- Fort wayne – (0:03) Justin Wynn 12-yard pass from Kota-Carone Colors (Kota-Carone Colors rush), Fort Wayne 35–28

3rd quarter

- Chicago – (10:01) Julie Harshbarger 24-yard field goal, Fort Wayne 35–31
- Fort wayne – (0:00) Chris Kolokithas 7-yard pass from Kota-Carone Colors (Chad Rollins kick failed), Fort Wayne 41–31

4th quarter

- Chicago – (13:30) Brandon Wogoman 8-yard pass from Alex Nunez (Julie Harshbarger kick failed), Fort Wayne 41–37
- Fort wayne – (12:18) Justin Wynn 24-yard pass from Kota-Carone Colors (Kota-Carone Colors rush failed), Fort Wayne 47–37
- Fort wayne – (2:50) Brandon Williams 2-yard rush (Kota-Carone Colors rush), Fort Wayne 55–37
- Chicago – (1:25) Brandon Wogoman 23-yard pass from Ron Ricciardi (D Carter pass from Brandon Wogoman), Fort Wayne 55–45
- Fort wayne – (0:48) Brandon Williams 5-yard rush (Kota-Carone Colors rush), Fort Wayne 63–45
- Fort wayne – (0:00) Paul Carter 50-yard interception return (none attempted), Fort Wayne 69–45

Passing

- Chicago – Ron Ricciardi: 9/17, 94 yards, 2 TD
- Fort wayne – Kota-Carone Colors: 13/22, 122 yards, 4 TD

Rushing

- Chicago – P Taylor: 9 att, 41 yards, 2 TD
- Fort wayne – Kota-Carone Colors: 11 att, 63 yards, 2 TD

Receiving

- Chicago – Brandon Wogoman: 9 rec, 85 yards, 3 TD
- Fort wayne – Brandon Walker-Roby: 4 rec, 41 yards, 0 TD

=== Week 8: vs. Cincinnati Commandos ===
Week 8: Cincinnati Commandos at Chicago Cardinals – Game summary

Quarter	1	2	3	4	Total
Commandos	14	14	14	20	62
Cardinals	0	6	8	8	22

at Odeum Expo Center, Villa Park, Illinois

- Date: May 1
- Game time: 7:00 p.m. CDT

Game information

1st quarter

- Cincinnati – (6:48) Ray Jackson 6–yard pass from Ben Mauk (Travis Johnson kick), Cincinnati 7–0
- Cincinnati - (2:02) Dominick Goodman 2-yard pass from Ben Mauk (Travis Johnson kick), Cincinnati 14-0

2nd quarter

- Cincinnati - (14:56) Robert Redd 3-yard pass from Ben Mauk (Travis Johnson kick), Cincinnati 21-0
- Chicago - (11:56) P Taylor 7-yard rush (P Taylor rush failed), Cincinnati 21-6
- Cincinnati - (0:19) E.J. Underwood 34-yard interception return (Travis Johnson kick), Cincinnati 28-6

3rd quarter

- Chicago - (9:23) S D'Alie 10-yard pass from William Ducey (P Taylor rush), Cincinnati 28-14
- Cincinnati - (7:38) Robert Redd 23-yard pass from Ben Mauk (Travis Johnson kick), Cincinnati 35-14
- Cincinnati - (2:50) Dominick Goodman 6-yard pass from Ben Mauk (Travis Johnson kick), Cincinnati 42-14

4th quarter

- Chicago - (14:48) P Taylor 1-yard rush (P Taylor), Cincinnati 42-22
- Cincinnati - (11:36) Johnny Long 8-yard pass from Ben Mauk (Travis Johnson kick failed), Cincinnati 48-22
- Cincinnati - (8:21) Brandon Boehm 4-yard pass from Ben Mauk (Travis Johnson kick), Cincinnati 55-22
- Cincinnati - (4:18) Chris Respress 50-yard interception return (Travis Johnson kick), Cincinnati 62-22

Passing

- Cincinnati – Ben Mauk: 24/30, 238 yards, 7 TD
- Chicago – William Ducey: 10/24, 117 yards, 1 TD

Rushing

- Cincinnati – Greg Moore: 7 att, 11 yards, 0 TD
- Chicago – P Taylor: 8 att, 13 yards, 2 TD

Receiving

- Cincinnati – Dominick Goodman: 8 rec, 69 yards, 2 TD
- Chicago – D Carter: 4 rec, 27 yards, 0 TD

=== Week 9: vs. Wisconsin Wolfpack ===
Week 9: Wisconsin Wolfpack at Chicago Cardinals – Game summary

Quarter	1	2	3	4	Total
Wolfpack	22	8	12	2	44
Cardinals	6	6	6	0	18

at Odeum Expo Center, Villa Park, Illinois

- Date: May 8
- Game time: 7:30 p.m. CDT
- Game attendance: 350

Game information

1st quarter

- Wisconsin – (13:32) Eric Donoval 5–yard rush (Matt Schabert drop-kick), Wisconsin 8–0
- Wisconsin – (7:56) Eric Donoval 2–yard rush (Matt Schabert drop-kick), Wisconsin 16–0
- Chicago - (5:21) Shawn McKeown 10-yard pass from Ron Ricciardi (P Taylor rush failed), Wisconsin 16-6
- Wisconsin – (3:30) Eric Donoval 30–yard pass from Matt Schabert (Matt Schabert drop-kick failed), Wisconsin 22–6

2nd quarter

- Wisconsin - (8:49) Marques Johnson 20-yard pass from Matt Schabert (Matt Schabert drop-kick), Wisconsin 30-6
- Chicago - (5:25) P Taylor 8-yard pass from Ron Ricciardi (Julie Harshbarger kick failed), Wisconsin 30-12

3rd quarter

- Wisconsin – (5:33) Eric Donoval 23–yard rush (Matt Schabert drop-kick failed), Wisconsin 36–12
- Chicago - (4:30) Shawn McKeown 16-yard pass from Ron Ricciardi (Ron Ricciardi pass failed), Wisconsin 36-18
- Wisconsin – (0:00) Eric Donoval 7–yard pass from Matt Schabert (Matt Schabert drop-kick failed), Wisconsin 42–18

4th quarter

- Wisconsin – (9:00) Team Safety, Wisconsin 44–18

Passing

- Wisconsin – Matt Schabert: 15/26, 196 yards, 3 TD
- Chicago – Ron Ricciardi: 10/26, 69 yards, 3 TD

Rushing

- Wisconsin – Eric Donoval: 9 att, 50 yards, 3 TD
- Chicago – P Taylor: 1 att, -1 yards, 0 TD

Receiving

- Wisconsin – Marques Johnson: 6 rec, 112 yards, 1 TD
- Chicago – D Jones: 3 rec, 11 yards, 0 TD

=== Week 10: vs. Cincinnati Commandos ===
Week 10: Chicago Cardinals at Cincinnati Commandos – Game summary

Quarter	1	2	3	4	Total
Cardinals	0	13	0	0	13
Commandos	28	13	13	7	61

at Cincinnati Gardens, Cincinnati, Ohio

- Date: May 15
- Game time: 7:30 p.m. EDT
- Game attendance: 2,825

Game information

1st quarter

- Cincinnati – (12:35) Greg Moore 8–yard rush (Travis Johnson kick failed), Cincinnati 6–0
- Cincinnati - (10:36) E.J. Underwood 47-yard interception return (Ben Mauk pass failed), Cincinnati 12-0
- Cincinnati – (4:02) Greg Moore 2–yard rush (Ben Mauk pass to Greg Moore), Cincinnati 20–0
- Cincinnati - (0:57) E.J. Underwood 31-yard interception return (Ben Mauk pass to Robert Redd), Cincinnati 28-0

2nd quarter

- Cincinnati – (13:06) Ben Mauk 11–yard rush (Travis Johnson kick), Cincinnati 35–0
- Chicago - (10:12) Matt Rahn 7-yard pass from Ron Ricciardi (Julie Harshbarger kick), Cincinnati 35-7
- Cincinnati - (8:58) Dominick Goodman 23-yard pass from Ben Mauk (Travis Johnson kick failed), Cincinnati 41-7
- Chicago - (0:17) Shawn McKeown 5-yard pass from Ron Ricciardi (Julie Harshbarger kick blocked), Cincinnati 41-13

3rd quarter

- Cincinnati - (8:44) Robert Redd 22-yard pass from Ben Mauk (Robert Redd rush failed), Cincinnati 47-13
- Cincinnati - (6:14) James Spikes 15-yard fumble recovery (Travis Johnson kick), Cincinnati 54-13

4th quarter

- Cincinnati - (11:40) Dominick Goodman 18-yard pass from Ben Mauk (Travis Johnson kick), Cincinnati 61-13

Passing

- Chicago – Ron Ricciardi: 20/42, 162 yards, 2 TD
- Cincinnati – Ben Mauk: 8/11, 88 yards, 3 TD

Rushing

- Chicago – Brandon Wogoman: 4 att, 28 yards, 0 TD
- Cincinnati – Ben Mauk: 3 att, 19 yards, 1 TD

Receiving

- Chicago – Shawn McKeown: 11 rec, 96 yards, 1 TD
- Cincinnati – Dominick Goodman: 4 rec, 61 yards, 2 TD

=== Week 11: vs. Wisconsin Wolfpack ===
Week 11: Chicago Cardinals at Wisconsin Wolfpack – Game summary

Quarter	1	2	3	4	Total
Cardinals	0	6	0	14	20
Wolfpack	13	14	19	12	58

at Hartmeyer Arena, Madison, Wisconsin

- Date: May 22
- Game time: 7:30 p.m. CDT

Game information

1st quarter

- Wisconsin – (8:57) Eric Donoval 7–yard pass from Matt Schabert (Tony Smidl rush failed), Wisconsin 6–0
- Wisconsin - (2:45) Marcus Lewis 31-yard pass from Matt Schabert (Tony Smidl kick), Wisconsin 13-0

2nd quarter

- Wisconsin - (13:14) Marcus Lewis 7-yard pass from Matt Schabert (Tony Smidl kick), Wisconsin 20-0
- Chicago - (9:58) Simon Chandler 5-yard pass from Ron Ricciardi (Julie Harshbarger kick failed), Wisconsin 20-6
- Wisconsin – (5:45) Eric Donoval 3–yard rush (Tony Smidl kick), Wisconsin 27–6

3rd quarter

- Wisconsin – (11:58) Eric Donoval 4–yard pass from Matt Schabert (Tony Smidl kick), Wisconsin 34–6
- Wisconsin – (7:34) Matt Schabert 2–yard rush (Tony Smidl kick failed), Wisconsin 40–6
- Wisconsin - (1:15) Marques Johnson 20-yard pass from Matt Schabert (Tony Smidl kick failed), Wisconsin 46-6

4th quarter

- Chicago - (13:10) Mike Hayden 3-yard rush (Ron Ricciardi pass failed), Wisconsin 46-12
- Chicago - (8:34) Shawn McKeown 23-yard pass from Ron Ricciardi (Ron Ricciardi pass to Brian Tait), Wisconsin 46-20
- Wisconsin – (6:55) Mark Mashburn 25–yard kickoff return (Tony Smidl kick failed), Wisconsin 52–20
- Wisconsin – (0:00) Team Safety, Wisconsin 44–18

Passing

- Wisconsin – Matt Schabert: 15/26, 196 yards, 3 TD
- Chicago – Ron Ricciardi: 10/26, 69 yards, 3 TD

Rushing

- Wisconsin – Eric Donoval: 9 att, 50 yards, 3 TD
- Chicago – P Taylor: 1 att, -1 yards, 0 TD

Receiving

- Wisconsin – Marques Johnson: 6 rec, 112 yards, 1 TD
- Chicago – D Jones: 3 rec, 11 yards, 0 TD

=== Week 12: vs. Miami Valley Silverbacks ===
Week 12: Miami Valley Silverbacks at Chicago Cardinals – Game summary

Quarter	1	2	3	4	Total
Silverbacks	20	12	12	14	58
Cardinals	6	0	12	6	24

at Odeum Expo Center, Villa Park, Illinois

- Date: May 29
- Game time: 7:30 p.m. CDT

Game information

1st quarter

- Miami valley – (14:07) Chris Stanford 12-yard fumble recovery (Kyenes Mincy pass to Will White), Miami Valley 8–0
- Miami valley – (9:07) Isaiah Cheatham 45-yard rush (Jason Cunningham kick failed), Miami Valley 14–0
- Chicago – (6:29) Brian Tait 12-yard pass from Ron Ricciardi (Julie Harshbarger kick failed), Miami Valley 14–6
- Miami valley – (00:42) Chris Stanford 1-yard rush (Chris Stanford pass failed), Miami Valley 20–6

2nd quarter

- Miami valley – (6:30) Aric Evans 13-yard pass from Chris Stanford (Jason Cunningham kick blocked), Miami Valley 26–6
- Miami valley – (2:34) Derrick Crawford 11-yard blocked field goal return (Jason Cunningham kick blocked), Miami Valley 32–6

3rd quarter

- Miami valley – (12:27) Isaiah Cheatham 5-yard rush (Larry Byndon pass failed), Miami Valley 38–6
- Chicago – (10:09) Adrain Herry 5-yard fumble recovery (Ron Ricciardi pass failed), Miami Valley 38–12
- Miami valley – (6:16) Eric Starks 4-yard pass from Chris Stanford (Chris Stanford rush failed), Miami Valley 44–12
- Chicago – (1:35) Shawn McKeown 11-yard pass from Ron Ricciardi (Ron Ricciardi pass failed), Miami Valley 44–18

4th quarter

- Miami valley – (13:41) Aric Evans 45-yard pass from Chris Stanford (Jason Cunningham kick), Miami Valley 51–18
- Miami valley – (5:44) Melvin Bryant 20-yard pass from Chris Stanford (Jason Cunningham kick), Miami Valley 58–18
- Chicago – (2:00) Scott Dupart 1-yard rush (Julie Harshbarger kick failed), Miami Valley 58–24

Passing

- Miami valley – Chris Stanford: 6/6, 120 yards, 4 TD
- Chicago – Ron Ricciardi: 12/28, 108 yards, 2 TD

Rushing

- Miami valley – Isaiah Cheatham: 2 att, 50 yards, 2 TD
- Chicago – Dino Cardone: 1 att, 14 yards, 0 TD

Receiving

- Miami valley – Melvin Bryant: 4 rec, 62 yards, 1 TD
- Chicago – James Jones: 4 rec, 47 yards, 0 TD

=== Week 13: vs. Fort Wayne FireHawks ===
Week 13: Fort Wayne FireHawks at Chicago Cardinals – Game summary

Quarter	1	2	3	4	Total
FireHawks	14	6	22	6	48
Cardinals	0	0	0	0	0

at Odeum Expo Center, Villa Park, Illinois

- Date: June 5
- Game time: 7:00 p.m. CDT
- Game attendance: 375

Game information

1st quarter

- Fort wayne – (13:38) Terry Moore 48-yard interception return (John Rocholl kick blocked), Fort Wayne 6–0
- Fort wayne – (6:48) Justin Wynn 24-yard pass from Kota-Carone Colors (Kota-Carone Colors pass to Brandon Williams), Fort Wayne 14–0

2nd quarter

- Fort wayne – (8:40) Tramaine Billie 10-yard blocked FG return (John Rocholl kick failed), Fort Wayne 20–0

3rd quarter

- Fort wayne – (10:40) Mike Tatum 12-yard pass from Mike Whitaker (John Rocholl kick), Fort Wayne 27–0
- Fort wayne – (9:01) Brandon Williams 23-yard fumble recovery (Mike Whitaker pass to Mike Tatum), Fort Wayne 35–0
- Fort wayne – (4:06) Mike Tatum 41-yard missed FG return (John Rocholl kick), Fort Wayne 42–0

4th quarter

- Fort wayne – (13:40) Tramaine Billie 35-yard interception return (Mike Whitaker pass failed), Fort Wayne 48–0

Passing

- Fort wayne – Kota-Carone Colors: 4/8, 58 yards, 1 TD
- Chicago – Ron Ricciardi: 4/12, 27 yards, 0 TD

Rushing

- Fort wayne – Victor Tolbert: 5 att, 20 yards, 0 TD
- Chicago – Michael Hayden: 4 att, 16 yards, 0 TD

Receiving

- Fort wayne – Justin Wynn: 4 rec, 58 yards, 1 TD
- Chicago – Shawn McKeown: 4 rec, 21 yards, 0 TD

== Post-season awards ==
Season	Player	Position	Award
2010	Adrian Henry	Defensive lineman	2nd Team All-CIFL
2010	Ricky Emery	Defensive back	2nd Team All-CIFL
2010	Brandon Wogoman	Kickoff returner	2nd Team All-CIFL
2010	Brandon Wogoman	All-Purpose Player	1st Team All-CIFL
2010	Matt Rahn	Offensive lineman	1st Team All-CIFL
2010	Brandon Wogoman	All-Purpose Player	All-Purpose Player of the Year
