= Columbus Aces =

US proposed indoor football team

- Founded: 2009
- League: Continental Indoor Football League
- Team history: Columbus Aces
- Based in: Columbus, Ohio
- Arena: Ohio Expo Center Coliseum
- Colors: Maroon, Silver
- Owner: Michael Murtch; Stanley Jackson
- President: Michael Burtch
- Head coach: Pepe Pearson
- Championships: 0

The Columbus Aces were a proposed indoor football team based in Columbus, Ohio. The team was set to be the final team expansion team of the Continental Indoor Football League in 2010. The Aces would have been the third attempt at arena or indoor football in Columbus, the first were the Arena Football League's, following prior teams the Columbus Thunderbolts (played only the 1991 season before moving to Cleveland) and the Columbus Destroyers (started play in 2004, ended play in 2008 as the team never came back from the AFL's season long restructuring hiatus). The owners of the Aces were Michael Burtch and Stanley Jackson. The Aces were scheduled to play their home games at the Ohio Expo Center Coliseum in Columbus, Ohio.

== Franchise history ==
It was announced in December 2009, that the Aces would be taking over for the Marion Mayhem. In January 2010, the Aces were officially announced to the league, as owners Michael Burtch and Stanley Jackson held a press conference announcing that the team's head coach would be Pepe Pearson, and that they team would play at the Ohio Expo Center Coliseum in Columbus, Ohio. The Aces were made up of the staff, coaches, and players were all those of the Mayhem. The Aces failed as an attempted move to Columbus due to not raising the necessary sponsorship funds to accommodate our teams needs. The team returned to Marion under the name of the Mayhem in March, and competed in the 2010 Continental Indoor Football League season, but did not have enough money to finish the season, forfeiting their final four games of the season.

== See also ==
- Marion Mayhem
- 2010 Marion Mayhem season
