= Bryan Williams (gridiron football) =

American gridiron football player (born 1987)

No. 24
- Position: Defensive back

Personal information
- Born: September 17, 1987 (age 39); Akron, Ohio, U.S.
- Listed height: 5 ft 11 in (1.80 m)
- Listed weight: 200 lb (91 kg)

Career information
- High school: Buchtel (Akron, Ohio)
- College: Akron
- NFL draft: 2009: undrafted

Career history
- Cleveland Browns (2009)*; Marion Mayhem (2010); Fort Wayne Firehawks (2010); Marion Blue Racers (2011); Pittsburgh Power (2011–2012); Edmonton Eskimos (2012–2013); Cleveland Gladiators (2015)*
- * Offseason or practice squad member only

Career CFL statistics
- Total tackles: 11
- Stats at CFL.ca (archived)

Career AFL statistics
- Total tackles: 63
- Forced fumbles: 1
- Fumble recoveries: 3
- Pass deflections: 14
- Stats at ArenaFan.com

Bryan Williams (born September 17, 1987) is an American former football defensive back. He played college football at the University of Akron.

== Early life ==
He was born the son of Sterling Campbell. Bryan attended Buchtel High School in Akron, Ohio. His football talents were good enough to earn him a 3-Star rating, according to Rivals.com. During his time at Buchtell, he was a three-year starter and also lettered as a freshman. He was named first team All-Ohio Division III running back after rushing for 1,897 yards and 26 touchdowns in 11 games as a senior. As a cornerback, compiled 52 tackles and eight interceptions, returning one for a TD. He compiled 17 career interceptions, and was named the Plain Dealer Defensive Player of the Year. He was also named first team All-Beacon Journal. In four varsity seasons, Williams helped Buchtel to three city championships, three state playoff berths and a 34-11 record (.756). He was named to the PrepStar All-Midwest Region, and was rated one of the top 75 players in the Midwest region by SuperPrep. Rated the No. 30 prospect in Ohio by Rivals.com, as well as a top 60 cornerback. Rated Ohio's No. 32 prospect by Scout.com. He played under Coach Claude Brown, and was also a four-time letterman in track and a member of the Academic Merit Roll.

== College career ==
=== Valley Forge Military Academy ===
He originally signed a letter of intent to play football at the University of Pittsburgh, but Williams failed to make it through the NCAA Clearinghouse and attended Valley Forge Military Academy. He also had offers from Akron, Minnesota, Kansas and Michigan State. After his first year at Valley Forge, he had once again signed to go to Pittsburgh, but was denied again. After he finished his 2nd year, he transferred to his local college, the University of Akron.

=== Akron ===
Williams saw extended time as Akron's starting running back in 2007. Williams was named third team All-Mid-American Conference both as a running back and return specialist in 2007. Despite being tabbed third team All-MAC as a running back in 2007, he moved to defense (strong safety) in the spring of 2008. He ranked second in the NCAA in kickoff return average and first in the MAC (31.90). His KOR average was additionally an Akron single-season record and ranked second on the MAC seasonal list (the record is 32.9 by Marshall's James Williams in 1999).

== Professional career ==
=== Cleveland Browns ===
Williams was signed as an undrafted free agent in 2009, by the Cleveland Browns to a 3-year contract, but he lasted only 2 months with the team, before being cut.

=== Marion Mayhem ===
After being cut by the Browns, Williams was signed by the Marion Mayhem, an indoor football team in the Continental Indoor Football League. The Mayhem lacked the financial ability to stay alive and folded with 4 games remaining in the 2010 season.

=== Fort Wayne FireHawks ===
Williams then signed to finish out the season with the not too distant Fort Wayne Firehawks, as well as a few other Mayhem players, including Mike Tatum. The FireHawks made the CIFL playoffs, and lost in the first round to the Wisconsin Wolfpack. Williams started both games in which he played for the FireHawks.

=== Marion Blue Racers ===
In 2011, Williams was again signed by an indoor football team. This time it was the Marion Blue Racers, who were owned and operated by former Pittsburgh Steeler LaMonte Coleman. The Blue Racers finished the regular season 8-2. Williams was named the CIFL's Defensive Player of the Week in Week 3. Williams led the league with 9 interceptions. The team would advance to the CIFL Championship Game, only to lose to the undefeated Cincinnati Commandos.

=== Pittsburgh Power ===
On July 8, 2011, Bryan Williams signed with the Pittsburgh Power of the Arena Football League.

=== Edmonton Eskimos ===
Williams was signed by the Edmonton Eskimos of the Canadian Football League on June 23, 2013, but was later released that same day. On August 14 he was signed off of the team's practice roster and onto the Eskimos' active roster.

=== Cleveland Gladiators ===
On October 24, 2014, Williams was assigned to the Cleveland Gladiators. He was placed on reassignment on March 30, 2015.
