= Hartmeyer Ice Arena =

Arena in Madison, Wisconsin, U.S.

- "The Hart"
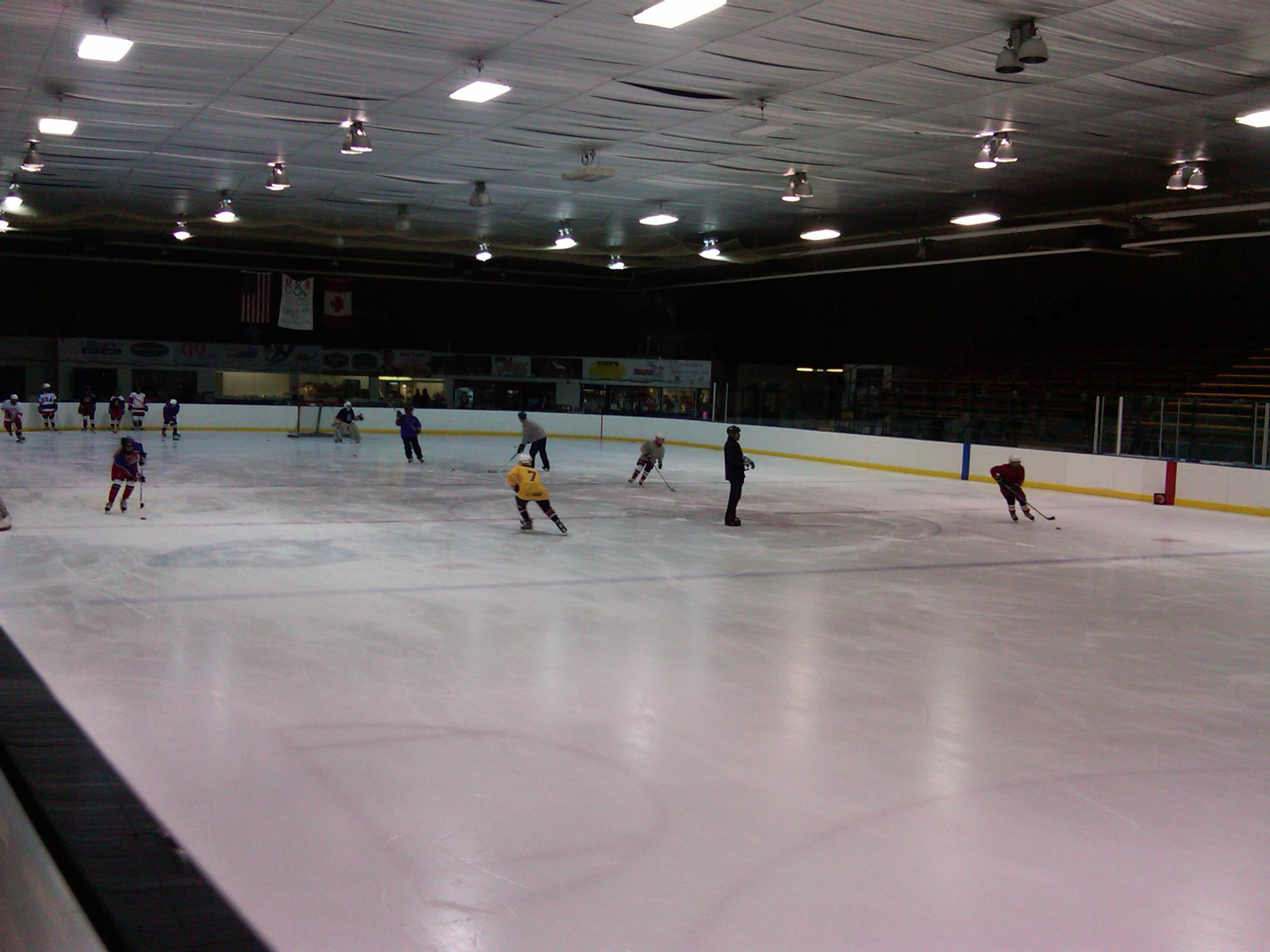
- Hartmeyer Arena
- Interactive map of Hartmeyer Ice Arena
- Location: 1834 Commercial Avenue; Madison, Wisconsin 53704
- Coordinates: 43.10723°N 89.36042°W
- Operator: Madison Ice, Inc.
- Capacity: 3,500
- Surface: Ice
- Public transit: Metro Transit

Construction
- Opened: 1960

Tenants
- Wisconsin Badgers (NCAA) (1963–1967); Madison Blues (USHL/CnHL) (1973–1977); Madison/Wisconsin Capitols (USHL) (1984–1995); Wisconsin Wolfpack (CIFL) (2010); Wisconsin Whalers (NA3HL) (2013–2015)

Hartmeyer Ice Arena is a 3,500 seat multi-purpose arena in Madison, Wisconsin. It has ice surfaces for hockey, figure skating, and open skating, but can also have the ice removed for other events, such as indoor football.

The building was constructed to play host to the Wisconsin Badgers men's ice hockey team, but only served that purpose for four years before the team moved to the Dane County Coliseum, now known as the Veterans Memorial Coliseum on the campus of the Alliant Energy Center.

== Wisconsin Badgers' hockey ==
Hartmeyer Ice Arena was constructed by Fenton Kelsey, Jr., a Madison business owner and avid hockey supporter. In the late 1950s and early 1960s, University of Wisconsin Athletics Director Ivy Williamson grew to enjoy watching youth hockey in Madison and began envisioning bringing the sport back to the varsity level at the university, which had not formally fielded a team since 1934. Sensing the need for a stadium-like facility were such a team to come to fruition, Kelsey stepped up to construct the Hartmeyer Ice Arena in 1960.

In 1962, the university agreed to pick up hockey again and fielded a team by posting fliers around campus. The team played its first game in front of 695 fans at the Hartmeyer, losing to St. Mary's of Winona, Minn., 13-6.

Wisconsin Hockey grew quickly and spectator demand soon strained the capacity of the arena. While legendary coach Bob Johnson led the team through his first season at the helm, construction neared completion on the Dane County Coliseum, which featured a multi-purpose design capable of hosting hockey and a capacity almost three times that of the Hartmeyer. The Badgers would move their hockey program to the Coliseum for the 1967-1968 season and play there until moving to the Kohl Center in 1998, winning five NCAA and 11 WCHA championships in that span.

Scheduling conflicts would force Wisconsin to move postseason hockey games back to Hartmeyer twice in 1977 and twice more in 1978.

== General use and youth hockey ==
Though no longer suitable for collegiate hockey, Hartmeyer was still the premier skating, amateur hockey and youth hockey facility in Madison for many years and one of few in the region capable of holding over 3,000 spectators. The Patriots Youth Hockey Association began using the arena in 1984 and still holds many events in the facility. Since 2006, Hartmeyer Ice Arena has also been home to the Madison Eastside Lakers Hockey team a Co-Op team consisting of Madison La Follette High School and Madison East High School. Prior to 2006 La Follette and East had separate hockey teams. The Eastside Lakers formed another co-op that still occasionally uses Hartmeyer. Monona Grove High School calls Hartmeyer its home ice, having their own locker rooms for Varsity and Junior Varsity.

The City of Madison operated Hartmeyer into the 21st century, despite the arena beginning to show signs of age. With an older surface that did not fare well in warmer months and competition from newer facilities, the arena became a financial strain to the city. In 2004, it was sold, along with the Madison Ice Arena, to Madison Ice, Inc., a not-for-profit organization committed to supporting skating and youth hockey in the Madison area.

In 2008, Madison Ice paid for improvements to the surface, allowing for the facility to be used year-round.

On September 25, 2010, Hartmeyer celebrated its 50th anniversary with a free, open-skating day for the general public.

== Wisconsin Wolfpack ==
In 2010, the Wisconsin Wolfpack of the Continental Indoor Football League announced plans to play its games at Hartmeyer. The move had historic overtones as the Wolfpack's inaugural indoor season was played at the Veterans Memorial Coliseum, meaning the Wolfpack was essentially reversing the course taken by Badger Hockey over 40 years earlier.

To facilitate the games, the ice was removed from the arena surface and the Wolfpack's turf, recycled from the Pensacola Barracudas, was laid. On April 3, 2010, a game between the Wisconsin Wolfpack and the Miami Valley Silverbacks became the first non-skating event to ever take place in the facility. The Wolfpack won the game, 38-32.

Among CIFL facilities, Hartmeyer quickly developed a reputation as a very unwelcoming building for opponents due to its age, loud environment and low ceiling, which frequently obstructed kicks and passes. The Wolfpack won six of its seven home games in 2010, including a playoff game against the Fort Wayne Firehawks, before announcing the team would not return in 2011.

== Wisconsin Whalers ==
In 2013, the North American 3 Hockey League approved the relocation of the Quad City Jr. Flames from Davenport, Iowa to Madison. The team was renamed the Wisconsin Whalers and has used Hartmeyer Ice Arena as the home venue since the 2013–14 season. In 2015, the Whalers moved to the Oregon Ice Arena in Oregon, Wisconsin.
