= 2010 Cincinnati Commandos season =

- Owner: Dennis Whitman; Paul Napier
- General manager: Travis Johnson
- Head coach: Billy Back
- Home stadium: Cincinnati Gardens; 2250 Seymour Avenue; Cincinnati, OH 45212

Results
- Record: 9-1
- League place: 1st
- Playoffs: Won Semifinals 48–24 (Silverbacks); Won CIFL Championship Game 54–40 (Wolfpack)

The 2010 Cincinnati Commandos season was the 1st season for the Continental Indoor Football League (CIFL) franchise. The Commandos were able to finish the season with a 9–1 record, and qualified for the playoffs as the 1st seed, where they went on to defeat the Wisconsin Wolfpack in the CIFL Championship Game.

== Standings ==
2010 Continental Indoor Football League
Team	W	L	T	PCT	PF	PA	PF (Avg.)	PA (Avg.)	STK
Cincinnati Commandos-y	9	1	0	.900	493	294	49.3	29.4	L1
Wisconsin Wolfpack-x	8	2	0	.800	345	213	34.5	21.3	W3
Fort Wayne FireHawks-x	6	4	0	.600	294	267	36.75	33.375	W2
Miami Valley Silverbacks-x	4	6	0	.400	309	354	34.33	39.33	W1
Marion Mayhem	3	7	0	.300	202	193	33.67	32.16	L5
Chicago Cardinals	0	10	0	.000	205	525	20.5	52.5	L10

== Regular season schedule ==
Week	Date	Opponent	Home/Away	Result
1	March 13	Miami Valley Silverbacks	Home	W 53-26
2		Bye	Week	
3	March 26	Marion Mayhem	Home	W 48-19
4	April 2	Fort Wayne Firehawks	Away	W 55-57
5	April 10	Wisconsin Wolfpack	Home	W 48-26
6		Bye	Week	
7	April 24	Miami Valley Silverbacks	Home	W 58-50
8	May 1	Chicago Cardinals	Away	W 62-22
9	May 8	Marion Mayhem	Away	W 38-20
10	May 15	Chicago Cardinals	Home	W 61-13
11	May 22	Fort Wayne Firehawks	Away	W 49-46
12	May 29	Wisconsin Wolfpack	Away	L 21-45
13		Bye	Week	

== Playoff schedule ==
Round	Date	Opponent	Home/Away	Result
Semifinals	June 18	(4) Miami Valley Silverbacks	Home	W 48-24
CIFL Championship	June 26	(2) Wisconsin Wolfpack	Home	W 54-40

== Roster ==
2010 Cincinnati Commandos roster
Quarterbacks: 7 Ben Mauk; Running backs: 3 Ray Jackson; 2 Greg Moore; Wide receivers: 12 Brandon Boehm; 8 Johnny Long; 1 Robert Redd	Offensive linemen: 79 Khalil El-Amin; 62 R King; 78 Frank Straub; 55 Derek Weaver; Defensive linemen: 50 D'arrell Brown; 95 Terrill Byrd; 11 James Frazier; 51 James Spikes	Linebackers: 15 Caleb Bostic; 10 Torry Cornett; Defensive backs: 21 Jeff Franklin; 5 Tez Morris; 4 E. J. Underwood; 6 Robbie Wilson; Special teams: 00 Travis Johnson	Reserve lists: 16 Dominick Goodman WR (IR); Updated June 26, 2010 Rookies in italics 21 Active, 1 Inactive

== Stats ==
=== Passing ===
Player	Comp.	Att.	Comp%	Yards	TD's	INT's	Rating
Ben Mauk	170	260	65.4%	1826	56	14	108.7
Dominick Goodman	7	12	58.3%	26	0	0	63.2
Robert Redd	1	1	100%	29	0	0	118.8
James Frazier	0	1	0%	0	0	0	39.6

=== Rushing ===
Player	Car.	Yards	Avg.	TD's	Long
Greg Moore	95	348	3.7	8	20
Ray Jackson	43	200	4.7	4	20
Ben Mauk	31	147	4.7	4	15
Dominick Goodman	25	93	3.7	4	15

=== Receiving ===
Player	Rec.	Yards	Avg.	TD's	Long
Dominick Goodman	47	473	10.1	18	45
Brandon Boehm	42	438	10.4	12	40
Robert Redd	36	398	11.1	15	38
Greg Moore	17	222	13.1	4	45

== Regular season ==
=== Week 1: vs. Miami Valley Silverbacks ===
Week 1: Miami Valley Silverbacks at Cincinnati Commandos – Game summary

Quarter	1	2	3	4	Total
Silverbacks	6	20	0	0	26
Commandos	0	21	13	19	53

at Cincinnati Gardens, Cincinnati, Ohio

- Date: March 13
- Game time: 7:00 p.m. EDT
- Game attendance: 5,490

Game information

1st quarter

- Miami Valley – (12:24) Derrick Moss 4-yard rush (Austin Goss kick failed), Miami Valley 6–0

2nd quarter

- Miami Valley – (13:09) Adell Givens 3-yard rush (Antonio Davis pass failed), Miami Valley 12–0
- Cincinnati - (9:43) Robert Redd 18-yard pass from Ben Mauk (Travis Johnson kick), Miami Valley 12-7
- Miami Valley – (5:33) Derrick Moss 8-yard rush (Adell Givens rush), Miami Valley 20–7
- Cincinnati - (2:29) Dominick Goodman 2-yard pass from Ben Mauk (Travis Johnson kick), Miami Valley 20-14
- Miami Valley – (0:40) Daniel Stover 13-yard pass from Antonio Davis (Derrick Moss rush failed), Miami Valley 26–14
- Cincinnati – (0:31) Ray Jackson 1-yard rush (Travis Johnson kick), Miami Valley 26–21

3rd quarter

- Cincinnati - (11:16) Robert Redd 1-yard pass from Ben Mauk (Travis Johnson kick failed), Cincinnati 27-26
- Cincinnati - (1:05) Greg Moore 1-yard rush (Travis Johnson kick), Cincinnati 34-26

4th quarter

- Cincinnati - (14:43) Jeff Franklin 12-yard interception return (Travis Johnson pass failed), Cincinnati 40-26
- Cincinnati – (9:40) Ray Jackson 20-yard rush (Travis Johnson kick), Cincinnati 47–26
- Cincinnati - (4:58) Dominick Goodman 45-yard pass from Ben Mauk (Travis Johnson kick failed), Cincinnati 53-26

Passing

- Miami Valley – Antonio Davis: 11/27, 130 yards, 1 TD
- Cincinnati – Ben Mauk: 11/16, 111 yards, 4 TD

Rushing

- Miami Valley – Derrick Moss: 6 att, 21 yards, 2 TD
- Cincinnati – Ray Jackson: 7 att, 52 yards, 2 TD

Receiving

- Miami Valley – Daniel Stover: 4 rec, 52 yards, 1 TD
- Cincinnati – Dominick Goodman: 4 rec, 50 yards, 2 TD

=== Week 3: vs. Marion Mayhem ===
Week 3: Marion Mayhem at Cincinnati Commandos – Game summary

Quarter	1	2	3	4	Total
Mayhem	0	9	10	0	19
Commandos	7	15	13	13	48

at Cincinnati Gardens, Cincinnati, Ohio

- Date: March 26
- Game time: 7:00 p.m. EDT
- Game attendance: 3,272

Game information

1st quarter

- Cincinnati – (8:28) Ben Mauk 11-yard rush (Travis Johnson kick), Cincinnati 7–0

2nd quarter

- Cincinnati - (14:21) Dominick Goodman 6-yard pass from Ben Mauk (Brandon Boehm rush), Cincinnati 15-0
- Cincinnati - (8:38) Robert Redd 10-yard pass from Ben Mauk (Travis Johnson kick), Cincinnati 22-0
- Marion – (3:05) Eric Schnatz 25-yard field goal, Cincinnati 22–3
- Marion – (0:00) Josh Davis 1-yard rush (Erick Schnatz kick failed), Cincinnati 22–9

3rd quarter

- Marion – (11:33) Josh Davis 11-yard rush (Erick Schnatz kick), Cincinnati 22–16
- Cincinnati - (9:05) Dominick Goodman 3-yard pass from Ben Mauk (Travis Johnson kick), Cincinnati 29-16
- Marion – (4:49) Eric Schnatz 21-yard field goal, Cincinnati 29-19
- Cincinnati - (2:22) Brandon Boehm 25-yard pass from Ben Mauk (Travis Johnson rush failed), Cincinnati 35-19

4th quarter

- Cincinnati - (8:07) Greg Moore 4-yard rush (Travis Johnson kick), Cincinnati 42-19
- Cincinnati - (0:25) Jesse Wendt 42-yard pass from Ben Mauk (Travis Johnson kick failed), Cincinnati 48-19

Passing

- Marion – Josh Davis: 11/27, 130 yards, 0 TD
- Cincinnati – Ben Mauk: 14/21, 192 yards, 5 TD

Rushing

- Marion – Josh Davis: 13 att, 90 yards, 2 TD
- Cincinnati – Greg Moore: 10 att, 44 yards, 1 TD

Receiving

- Marion – Mike Tatum: 4 rec, 42 yards, 0 TD
- Cincinnati – Dominick Goodman: 5 rec, 52 yards, 2 TD

=== Week 4: vs. Fort Wayne FireHawks ===
Week 4: Cincinnati Commandos at Fort Wayne FireHawks – Game summary

Quarter	1	2	3	4	Total
Commandos	13	29	0	13	55
FireHawks	7	6	14	0	27

at Allen County War Memorial Coliseum, Fort Wayne, Indiana

- Date: April 2
- Game time: 7:00 p.m. EDT
- Game attendance: 2,456

Game information

1st quarter

- Fort Wayne – (10:54) Brandon Williams 21-yard pass from Adam Gibson (Katie Hnida kick), Fort Wayne 7–0
- Cincinnati – (3:22) Brandon Boehm 10–yard pass from Ben Mauk (Travis Johnson kick), 7–7
- Cincinnati – (0:58) Greg Moore 6-yard pass from Ben Mauk (Travis Johnson kick failed), Cincinnati 13–7

2nd quarter

- Cincinnati – (9:40) Robert Redd 3-yard pass from Ben Mauk (Dominick Goodman pass from Ben Mauk), Cincinnati 21–7
- Cincinnati – (7:29) Dominick Goodman 21–yard pass from Ben Mauk (Travis Johnson kick), Cincinnati 28–7
- Fort Wayne – (6:37) Justin Wynn 33-yard run (Katie Hnida kick blocked), Cincinnati 28–13
- Cincinnati – (0:30) Robbie Wilson 27-yard interception return (Travis Johnson kick), Cincinnati 35–13
- Cincinnati – (0:00) Robert Redd 35-yard interception return (Travis Johnson kick), Cincinnati 42–13

3rd quarter

- Fort Wayne – (13:15) Justin Wynn 18-yard run (Chris Kolokithas pass from Justin Wynn), Cincinnati 42–21
- Fort Wayne – (5:40) Brandon Williams 13-yard run (Justin Wynn pass failed), Cincinnati 42–27

4th quarter

- Cincinnati – (12:13) Greg Moore 11-yard run (Travis Johnson rush failed), Cincinnati 48–21
- Cincinnati – (0:10) Dominick Goodman 4–yard pass from Ben Mauk (Travis Johnson kick), Cincinnati 55–27

Passing

- Cincinnati – Ben Mauk: 16/23, 141 yards, 5 TD
- Fort Wayne – Justin Wynn: 6/21, 44 yards, 0 TD

Rushing

- Cincinnati – Greg Moore: 10 att, 17 yards, 1 TD
- Fort Wayne – Justin Wynn: 8 att, 85 yards, 2 TD

Receiving

- Cincinnati – Dominick Goodman: 6 rec, 61 yards, 2 TD
- Fort Wayne – Zach Rainey: 5 rec, 53 yards, 0 TD

=== Week 5: vs. Wisconsin Wolfpack ===
Week 5: Wisconsin Wolfpack at Cincinnati Commandos – Game summary

Quarter	1	2	3	4	Total
Wolfpack	6	7	7	6	26
Commandos	13	14	6	15	48

at Cincinnati Gardens, Cincinnati, Ohio

- Date: April 10
- Game time: 7:00 p.m. EDT
- Game attendance: 3,049

Game information

1st quarter

- Cincinnati – (14:07) Brandon Boehm 40-yard pass from Ben Mauk (Travis Johnson kick), Cincinnati 7–0
- Wisconsin – (4:23) Dan Roberts 15-yard rush (Tony Smidl kick failed), Cincinnati 7–6
- Cincinnati - (1:55) Dominick Goodman 11-yard pass from Ben Mauk (Travis Johnson kick blocked), Cincinnati 13-6

2nd quarter

- Cincinnati - (8:28) Dominick Goodman 10-yard pass from Ben Mauk (Ben Mauk pass to Robert Redd), Cincinnati 21-6
- Wisconsin – (3:35) Andre Drye 10-yard interception return (Tony Smidl kick), Cincinnati 21–13
- Cincinnati - (0:51) Dominick Goodman 19-yard pass from Ben Mauk (Travis Johnson kick failed), Cincinnati 27-13

3rd quarter

- Wisconsin – (13:50) Calvin Thomas 9-yard pass from Dan Roberts (Tony Smidl kick), Cincinnati 27–20
- Cincinnati - (8:31) Dominick Goodman 7-yard pass from Ben Mauk (Ben Mauk pass failed), Cincinnati 33-20

4th quarter

- Cincinnati - (13:51) Ray Jackson 4-yard rush (Greg Moore rush), Cincinnati 41-20
- Cincinnati - (1:00) Brandon Boehm 13-yard pass from Ben Mauk (Travis Johnson kick), Cincinnati 48-20
- Wisconsin – (0:03) Marcus Lewis 14-yard pass from Dan Roberts (Dan Roberts rush failed), Cincinnati 48–26

Passing

- Wisconsin – Dan Roberts: 10/20, 86 yards, 2 TD
- Cincinnati – Ben Mauk: 15/24, 196 yards, 6 TD

Rushing

- Wisconsin – Dan Roberts: 11 att, 40 yards, 1 TD
- Cincinnati – Ray Jackson: 7 att, 45 yards, 1 TD

Receiving

- Wisconsin – Marcus Lewis: 5 rec, 34 yards, 1 TD
- Cincinnati – Dominick Goodman: 7 rec, 82 yards, 4 TD

=== Week 7: vs. Miami Valley Silverbacks ===
Week 7: Miami Valley Silverbacks at Cincinnati Commandos – Game summary

Quarter	1	2	3	4	Total
Silverbacks	0	6	20	24	50
Commandos	18	14	18	8	58

at Cincinnati Gardens, Cincinnati, Ohio

- Date: April 24
- Game time: 7:00 p.m. EDT

Game information

1st quarter

- Cincinnati - (12:31) Robert Redd 4-yard pass from Ben Mauk (Ray Jackson rush failed), Cincinnati 6-0
- Cincinnati - (6:05) Dominick Goodman 1-yard pass from Ben Mauk (Ben Mauk pass failed), Cincinnati 12-0
- Cincinnati – (1:16) Ben Mauk 12-yard rush (Ben Mauk pass failed), Cincinnati 18–0

2nd quarter

- Cincinnati - (6:01) Brandon Boehm 2-yard pass from Ben Mauk (Greg Moore rush failed), Cincinnati 24-0
- Miami Valley – (3:07) Adell Givens 12-yard pass from Kyenes Mincy (Kyenes Mincy rush failed), Cincinnati 24–6
- Cincinnati - (0:43) Robert Redd 2-yard pass from Ben Mauk (Ben Mauk pass to Dominick Goodman), Cincinnati 32-6

3rd quarter

- Miami Valley – (14:49) Adell Givens 50-yard kickoff return (Derrick Moss rush failed), Cincinnati 32–12
- Cincinnati - (12:06) Robert Redd 6-yard pass from Ben Mauk (Ben Mauk pass failed), Cincinnati 38-12
- Miami Valley – (7:57) Melvin Bryant 1-yard pass from Kyenes Mincy (Kyenes Mincy pass to Daniel Stover), Cincinnati 38–20
- Cincinnati - (5:37) Brandon Boehm 31-yard pass from Ben Mauk (Ben Mauk rush failed), Cincinnati 44-20
- Miami Valley – (3:20) Daniel Stover 29-yard pass from Kyenes Mincy (Kyenes Mincy pass failed), Cincinnati 44–26
- Cincinnati - (0:01) Dominick Goodman 1-yard rush (Robert Redd rush failed), Cincinnati 50-26

4th quarter

- Miami Valley – (10:01) Aric Evans 19-yard pass from Kyenes Mincy (Kyenes Mincy pass to Daniel Stover), Cincinnati 50–34
- Miami Valley – (7:00) Team Safety, Cincinnati 50–36
- Miami Valley – (2:35) Daniel Stover 4-yard pass from Kyenes Mincy (Kyenes Mincy pass to Daniel Stover), Cincinnati 50–44
- Cincinnati - (1:14) Robert Redd 34-yard pass from Ben Mauk (Greg Moore rush), Cincinnati 58-44
- Miami Valley – (0:40) Kyenes Mincy 24-yard rush (Kyenes Mincy rush failed), Cincinnati 58–50

Passing

- Miami Valley – Kyenes Mincy: 10/24, 102 yards, 5 TD
- Cincinnati – Ben Mauk: 14/18, 148 yards, 7 TD

Rushing

- Miami Valley – Kyenes Mincy: 7 att, 37 yards, 1 TD
- Cincinnati – Greg Moore: 4 att, 34 yards, 0 TD

Receiving

- Miami Valley – Melvin Bryant: 5 rec, 47 yards, 1 TD
- Cincinnati – Brandon Boehm: 4 rec, 61 yards, 2 TD

=== Week 8: vs. Chicago Cardinals ===
Week 8: Cincinnati Commandos at Chicago Cardinals – Game summary

Quarter	1	2	3	4	Total
Commandos	14	14	14	20	62
Cardinals	0	6	8	8	22

at Odeum Expo Center, Villa Park, Illinois

- Date: May 1
- Game time: 7:00 p.m. CDT

Game information

1st quarter

- Cincinnati – (6:48) Ray Jackson 6–yard pass from Ben Mauk (Travis Johnson kick), Cincinnati 7–0
- Cincinnati - (2:02) Dominick Goodman 2-yard pass from Ben Mauk (Travis Johnson kick), Cincinnati 14-0

2nd quarter

- Cincinnati - (14:56) Robert Redd 3-yard pass from Ben Mauk (Travis Johnson kick), Cincinnati 21-0
- Chicago - (11:56) P Taylor 7-yard rush (P Taylor rush failed), Cincinnati 21-6
- Cincinnati - (0:19) E.J. Underwood 34-yard interception return (Travis Johnson kick), Cincinnati 28-6

3rd quarter

- Chicago - (9:23) S D'Alie 10-yard pass from William Ducey (P Taylor rush), Cincinnati 28-14
- Cincinnati - (7:38) Robert Redd 23-yard pass from Ben Mauk (Travis Johnson kick), Cincinnati 35-14
- Cincinnati - (2:50) Dominick Goodman 6-yard pass from Ben Mauk (Travis Johnson kick), Cincinnati 42-14

4th quarter

- Chicago - (14:48) P Taylor 1-yard rush (P Taylor), Cincinnati 42-22
- Cincinnati - (11:36) Johnny Long 8-yard pass from Ben Mauk (Travis Johnson kick failed), Cincinnati 48-22
- Cincinnati - (8:21) Brandon Boehm 4-yard pass from Ben Mauk (Travis Johnson kick), Cincinnati 55-22
- Cincinnati - (4:18) Chris Respress 50-yard interception return (Travis Johnson kick), Cincinnati 62-22

Passing

- Cincinnati – Ben Mauk: 24/30, 238 yards, 7 TD
- Chicago – William Ducey: 10/24, 117 yards, 1 TD

Rushing

- Cincinnati – Greg Moore: 7 att, 11 yards, 0 TD
- Chicago – P Taylor: 8 att, 13 yards, 2 TD

Receiving

- Cincinnati – Dominick Goodman: 8 rec, 69 yards, 2 TD
- Chicago – D Carter: 4 rec, 27 yards, 0 TD

=== Week 9: vs. Marion Mayhem ===
Week 9: Cincinnati Commandos at Marion Mayhem – Game summary

Quarter	1	2	3	4	Total
Commandos	10	14	0	14	38
Mayhem	0	7	7	6	20

at Veterans Memorial Coliseum, Marion, Ohio

- Date: May 8
- Game time: 7:30 p.m. EDT
- Game attendance: 1732

Game information

1st quarter

- Cincinnati – (12:09) Travis Johnson 46–yard field goal, Cincinnati 3–0
- Cincinnati - (3:30) Brandon Boehm 10-yard pass from Ben Mauk (Travis Johnson kick), Cincinnati 10-0

2nd quarter

- Marion - (14:52) Victor Tolbert 9-yard rush (John Sims kick), Cincinnati 10-7
- Cincinnati - (0:34) Greg Moore 45-yard pass from Ben Mauk (Travis Johnson kick), Cincinnati 17-7
- Cincinnati - (0:02) Ben Mauk 6-yard rush (Travis Johnson kick), Cincinnati 24-7

3rd quarter

- Marion - (5:51) Victor Tolbert 2-yard rush (John Sims kick), Cincinnati 24-14

4th quarter

- Cincinnati - (11:09) Robert Redd 24-yard pass from Ben Mauk (Travis Johnson kick), Cincinnati 31-14
- Cincinnati - (3:40) Jesse Wendt 7-yard pass from Ben Mauk (Travis Johnson kick), Cincinnati 38-14
- Marion - (2:58) Mike Tatum 53-yard kickoff return (Josh Davis pass failed), Cincinnati 38-20

Passing

- Cincinnati – Ben Mauk: 12/28, 149 yards, 4 TD
- Marion – Josh Davis: 12/30, 119 yards, 0 TD

Rushing

- Cincinnati – Ray Jackson: 6 att, 16 yards, 0 TD
- Marion - Josh Davis: 3 att, 24 yards, 0 TD

Receiving

- Cincinnati – Dominick Goodman: 4 rec, 36 yards, 0 TD
- Marion – Victor Tolbert: 5 rec, 29 yards, 0 TD

=== Week 10: vs. Chicago Cardinals ===
Week 10: Chicago Cardinals at Cincinnati Commandos – Game summary

Quarter	1	2	3	4	Total
Cardinals	0	13	0	0	13
Commandos	28	13	13	7	61

at Cincinnati Gardens, Cincinnati, Ohio

- Date: May 15
- Game time: 7:30 p.m. EDT
- Game attendance: 2825

Game information

1st quarter

- Cincinnati – (12:35) Greg Moore 8–yard rush (Travis Johnson kick failed), Cincinnati 6–0
- Cincinnati - (10:36) E.J. Underwood 47-yard interception return (Ben Mauk pass failed), Cincinnati 12-0
- Cincinnati – (4:02) Greg Moore 2–yard rush (Ben Mauk pass to Greg Moore), Cincinnati 20–0
- Cincinnati - (0:57) E.J. Underwood 31-yard interception return (Ben Mauk pass to Robert Redd), Cincinnati 28-0

2nd quarter

- Cincinnati – (13:06) Ben Mauk 11–yard rush (Travis Johnson kick), Cincinnati 35–0
- Chicago - (10:12) Matt Rahn 7-yard pass from Ron Ricciardi (Julie Harshbarger kick), Cincinnati 35-7
- Cincinnati - (8:58) Dominick Goodman 23-yard pass from Ben Mauk (Travis Johnson kick failed), Cincinnati 41-7
- Chicago - (0:17) Shawn McKeown 5-yard pass from Ron Ricciardi (Julie Harshbarger kick blocked), Cincinnati 41-13

3rd quarter

- Cincinnati - (8:44) Robert Redd 22-yard pass from Ben Mauk (Robert Redd rush failed), Cincinnati 47-13
- Cincinnati - (6:14) James Spikes 15-yard fumble recovery (Travis Johnson kick), Cincinnati 54-13

4th quarter

- Cincinnati - (11:40) Dominick Goodman 18-yard pass from Ben Mauk (Travis Johnson kick), Cincinnati 61-13

Passing

- Chicago – Ron Ricciardi: 20/42, 162 yards, 2 TD
- Cincinnati – Ben Mauk: 8/11, 88 yards, 3 TD

Rushing

- Chicago – Brandon Wogoman: 4 att, 28 yards, 0 TD
- Cincinnati – Ben Mauk: 3 att, 19 yards, 1 TD

Receiving

- Chicago – Shawn McKeown: 11 rec, 96 yards, 1 TD
- Cincinnati – Dominick Goodman: 4 rec, 61 yards, 2 TD

=== Week 11: vs. Fort Wayne FireHawks ===
Week 11: Fort Wayne FireHawks at Cincinnati Commandos – Game summary

Quarter	1	2	3	4	Total
FireHawks	12	6	16	12	46
Commandos	7	14	6	22	49

at Cincinnati Gardens, Cincinnati, Ohio

- Date: May 22
- Game time: 7:00 p.m. EDT
- Game attendance: 2,218

Game information

1st quarter

- Cincinnati – (11:47) Dominick Goodman 10–yard pass from Ben Mauk (Travis Johnson kick), Cincinnati 7–0
- Fort Wayne – (7:55) Tramaine Billie 2–yard rush (Brian Clawson kick failed), Cincinnati 7–6
- Fort Wayne – (1:00) Jesse Allen 0-yard fumble recovery (Kota-Carone Colors pass intercepted), Fort Wayne 12–7

2nd quarter

- Cincinnati - (13:44) Dominick Goodman 4-yard pass from Ben Mauk (Travis Johnson kick), Cincinnati 14-12
- Fort Wayne - (11:13) Tramaine Billie 2-yard rush (Brian Clawson kick failed), Fort Wayne 18-14
- Cincinnati - (6:30) Johnny Long 14-yard pass from Ben Mauk (Travis Johnson kick), Cincinnati 21-18

3rd quarter

- Fort Wayne - (14:51) Justin Wynn 57-yard kickoff return (Kota-Carone Colors pass to Chirs Kolokithas), Fort Wayne 26-21
- Cincinnati - (11:32) Dominick Goodman 6-yard pass from Ben Mauk (Ben Mauk pass failed), Cincinnati 27-26
- Fort Wayne - (1:32) Tramaine Billie 3-yard rush (Tramaine Billie rush)

4th quarter

- Fort Wayne - (10:31) Tramaine 0-yard fumble recovery (Brian Clawson kick failed), Fort Wayne 40-27
- Cincinnati - (9:28) Greg Moore 5-yard rush (Travis Johnson kick), Fort Wayne 40-34
- Fort Wayne - (4:16) Tramaine Billie 5-yard rush (Brian Clawson kick blocked), Fort Wayne 46-34
- Cincinnati - (2:45) Greg Moore 40-yard pass from Ben Mauk (Travis Johnson kick), Fort Wayne 46-41
- Cincinnati - (0:50) E.J. Underwood 53-yard missed FG return (Ray Jackson rush), Cincinnati 49-46

Passing

- Fort Wayne – Kota-Carone Colors: 6/18, 56 yards, 0 TD
- Cincinnati – Ben Mauk: 20/32, 167 yards, 5 TD

Rushing

- Fort Wayne – Kota-Carone Colors: 6 att, 41 yards, 0 TD
- Cincinnati – Greg Moore: 8 att, 37 yards, 1 TD

Receiving

- Fort Wayne – Jermaine Woolfolk: 3 rec, 17 yards, 0 TD
- Cincinnati – Brandon Boehm: 6 rec, 35 yards, 0 TD

=== Week 12: vs. Wisconsin Wolfpack ===
Week 12: Cincinnati Commandos at Wisconsin Wolfpack – Game summary

Quarter	1	2	3	4	Total
Commandos	7	0	6	8	21
Wolfpack	0	7	20	18	45

at Hartmeyer Arena, Madison, Wisconsin

- Date: May 29
- Game time: 7:00 p.m. CST

Game information

1st quarter

- Cincinnati – (6:25) Dominick Goodman 2-yard rush (Travis Johnson kick), Cincinnati 7–0

2nd quarter

- Wisconsin – (12:20) Marques Johnson 3-yard pass from Matt Schabert (Tony Smidl kick) 7-7

3rd quarter

- Wisconsin – (8:25) Matt Schabert 1-yard rush (Tony Smidl kick), Wisconsin 14–7
- Cincinnati – (7:01) Dominick Goodman 15-yard rush (Travis Johnson kick failed), Wisconsin 14–13
- Wisconsin – (4:41) Marques Johnson 34-yard pass from Matt Schabert (Tony Smidl kick blocked) Wisconsin 20-13
- Wisconsin – (0:40) Mitchell Moore 15-yard pass from Matt Schabert (Tony Smidl kick) Wisconsin 27-13

4th quarter

- Cincinnati – (11:00) Dominick Goodman 1-yard rush (Dominick Goodman pass to James Frazier), Wisconsin 27–21
- Wisconsin – (7:19) Marques Johnson 15-yard pass from Matt Schabert (Matt Schabert pass failed), Wisconsin 33–21
- Wisconsin – (5:43) Kurt Ware 0-yard fumble recovery (Tony Smidl kick failed), Wisconsin 39–21
- Wisconsin – (0:20) Marques Johnson 5-yard pass from Matt Schabert (Tony Smidl kick failed), Wisconsin 45–21

Passing

- Wisconsin – Matt Schabert: 18/23, 128 yards, 5 TD
- Cincinnati – Dominick Goodman: 7/12, 26 yards, 0 TD

Rushing

- Wisconsin – Matt Schabert: 1 att, 10 yards, 1 TD
- Cincinnati – Dominick Goodman: 22 att, 90 yards, 3 TD

Receiving

- Wisconsin – Marques Johnson: 5 rec, 64 yards, 4 TD
- Cincinnati – Johnny Long: 3 rec, 17 yards, 0 TD

== Playoffs ==
=== Semifinals: vs. Miami Valley Silverbacks ===
Semifinals: Miami Valley Silverbacks at Cincinnati Commandos – Game summary

Quarter	1	2	3	4	Total
Silverbacks	0	6	6	12	24
Commandos	21	0	13	14	48

at Cincinnati Gardens, Cincinnati, Ohio

- Date: June 18
- Game time: 8:00 p.m. EDT
- Game attendance: 2,225

Game information

1st quarter

- Cincinnati - (13:28) Robert Redd 17-yard pass from Ben Mauk (Travis Johnson kick), Cincinnati 7-0
- Cincinnati – (11:01) Ray Jackson 7-yard rush (Travis Johnson kick failed), Cincinnati 13–0
- Cincinnati - (3:43) Johnny Long 1-yard pass from Ben Mauk (Ben Mauk pass to Brandon Boehm), Cincinnati 21-0

2nd quarter

- Miami Valley – (7:30) Daniel Stover 16-yard pass from Chris Stanford (Jason Cunningham rush failed), Cincinnati 21–6

3rd quarter

- Cincinnati - (12:18) Brandon Boehm 12-yard pass from Ben Mauk (Travis Johnson kick), Cincinnati 28-6
- Miami Valley – (7:30) Melvin Bryant 15-yard pass from Chris Stanford (Chris Stanford rush failed), Cincinnati 28–12
- Cincinnati - (2:53) Robert Redd 1-yard pass from Ben Mauk (Travis Johnson kick blocked), Cincinnati 34-12

4th quarter

- Cincinnati - (12:39) Brandon Boehm 33-yard pass from Ben Mauk (Travis Johnson kick), Cincinnati 41-12
- Miami Valley – (8:45) Chris Stanford 1-yard rush (Chris Stanford pass failed), Cincinnati 41–18
- Cincinnati - (6:25) Johnny Long 34-yard pass from Ben Mauk (Travis Johnson kick), Cincinnati 48-18
- Miami Valley – (2:13) Aric Evans 4-yard pass from Chris Stanford (Chris Stanford pass failed), Cincinnati 48–24

Passing

- Miami Valley – Chris Stanford: 9/18, 89 yards, 3 TD
- Cincinnati – Ben Mauk: 18/28, 201 yards, 6 TD

Rushing

- Miami Valley – Derrick Moss: 5 att, 40 yards, 0 TD
- Cincinnati – Ray Jackson: 7 att, 24 yards, 1 TD

Receiving

- Miami Valley – Melvin Bryant: 5 rec, 56 yards, 1 TD
- Cincinnati – Brandon Boehm: 7 rec, 78 yards, 2 TD

=== CIFL Championship Game: vs. Wisconsin Wolfpack ===
CIFL Championship Game: Wisconsin Wolfpack at Cincinnati Commandos – Game summary

Quarter	1	2	3	4	Total
Wolfpack	7	7	12	14	40
Commandos	14	6	20	14	54

at Cincinnati Gardens, Cincinnati, Ohio

- Date: June 26
- Game time: 8:00 p.m. EDT
- Game attendance: 2,758

Game information

1st quarter

- Cincinnati - (13:55) Greg Moore 5-yard rush (Travis Johnson rush failed), Cincinnati 6-0
- Wisconsin – (10:11) Marcus Lewis 2-yard pass from Matt Schabert (Tony Smidl kick), Wisconsin 7–6
- Cincinnati - (4:39) Tony Cornett 0-yard fumble recovery (Ben Mauk pass to Ray Jackson), Cincinnati 14-7

2nd quarter

- Cincinnati – (5:04) Brandon Boehm 10-yard pass from Ben Mauk (Brandon Boehm rush failed), Cincinnati 20–7
- Wisconsin – (0:00) Marcus Lewis 1-yard pass from Matt Schabert (Tony Smidl kick), Cincinnati 20–14
- Cincinnati - (1:55) Dominick Goodman 11-yard pass from Ben Mauk (Travis Johnson kick blocked), Cincinnati 13-6

3rd quarter

- Wisconsin – (12:17) Brandon Wogoman 7-yard pass from Matt Schabert (Tony Smidl kick), Wisconsin 21–20
- Cincinnati - (9:48) Robert Redd 27-yard pass from Ben Mauk (Ray Jackson rush), Cincinnati 28-21
- Wisconsin – (6:23) Tony Smidl 35-yard field goal, Cincinnati 28–24
- Cincinnati - (6:08) Ray Jackson 48-yard kickoff return (Brandon Boehm rush failed), Cincinnati 34-24
- Cincinnati - (1:19) Brandon Boehm 29-yard pass from Ben Mauk (Ben Mauk rush fumbled), Cincinnati 40-24
- Wisconsin – (1:19) Kurt Ware PAT return, Cincinnati 40–26

4th quarter

- Wisconsin – (12:53) Brandon Wogoman 12-yard pass from Matt Schabert (Tony Smidl kick), Cincinnati 40–33
- Cincinnati - (8:54) Greg Moore 12-yard pass from Ben Mauk (Travis Johnson kick), Cincinnati 47-33
- Wisconsin – (1:22) Marcus Lewis 5-yard pass from Matt Schabert (Tony Smidl kick), Cincinnati 47–40
- Cincinnati - (0:32) Greg Moore 1-yard rush (Travis Johnson kick), Cincinnati 54-40

Passing

- Wisconsin – Matt Schabert: 23/37, 214 yards, 5 TD
- Cincinnati – Ben Mauk: 18/29, 195 yards, 4 TD

Rushing

- Wisconsin – Matt Schabert: 2 att, 5 yards, 0 TD
- Cincinnati – Greg Moore: 18 att, 58 yards, 2 TD

Receiving

- Wisconsin – Brandon Wogoman: 14 rec, 151 yards, 2 TD
- Cincinnati – Robert Redd: 8 rec, 122 yards, 1 TD

== CIFL Awards ==
- MVP - Ben Mauk
- Offensive Player of the Year - Dominick Goodman
- Co-Defensive Player of the Year - James Spikes
- Co-Coach of the Year - Billy Back

1st Team All-CIFL

- QB Ben Mauk
- RB Greg Moore
- WR Dominick Goodman
- OL Khalil El-Amin
- NT Terrill Byrd
- DE James Spikes
- DB E.J. Underwood
- DB Jeff Franklin

2nd Team All-CIFL

- OL Frank Straub
- DB Robbie Wilson
- K Travis Johnson
- AP Robert Redd
