= Chris Angel =

Chris Angel may refer to:

- Chris Angel (wrestler) (born 1982), Puerto Rican wrestler
- Chris Angel, director of Wishmaster 3: Beyond the Gates of Hell and Wishmaster: The Prophecy Fulfilled
- Chris Angel (American football), Arena Football League player for the 2007 Colorado Crush
- Criss Angel (born 1967), illusionist, escapologist, stunt performer, and actor
