= Caleb Bostic =

American gridiron football player (born 1988)

No. 15
- Position: Linebacker

Personal information
- Born: August 25, 1988 (age 38); Columbus, Ohio, U.S.
- Listed height: 6 ft 3 in (1.91 m)
- Listed weight: 240 lb (109 kg)

Career information
- High school: Galloway (OH) Westland
- College: Miami (OH)
- NFL draft: 2010: undrafted

Career history
- Cincinnati Commandos (2010); Pittsburgh Power (2011); Georgia Force (2011–2012); Texas Revolution (2013); Alabama Hammers (2013–2014); Philadelphia Soul (2015); New Orleans VooDoo (2015); Winnipeg Blue Bombers (2017)*
- * Offseason or practice squad member only

Awards and highlights
- CIFL champion (2010); PIFL champion (2013)

Career AFL statistics
- Tackles: 75.5
- Sacks: 7
- Forced fumbles: 5
- Stats at ArenaFan.com

Caleb Bostic (born August 25, 1988) is an American former professional football linebacker. He played college football at Miami University.

== Professional career ==
Bostic was invited to attend mini camp with the Cincinnati Bengals in April 2010, Bostic never signed a free agent contract.

=== Cincinnati Commandos ===
In June 2010, Bostic signed with the Cincinnati Commandos, an indoor football team who played in the Continental Indoor Football League. Bostic joined the Commandos for their two playoffs games, starting both, helping the Commandos win the CIFL Championship Game in their first year of existence.

=== Pittsburgh Power ===
In December 2010, Bostic was assigned to the Pittsburgh Power. After only playing in two games, he was released on May 6, 2011.

=== Georgia Force ===
Bostic didn't remain a free agent very long, as he signed with the Georgia Force on May 11, 2011. He has re-signed with the Force for the 2012 season.

=== Alabama Hammers ===
Bostic played for the Alabama Hammers during their 2013 championship season, and during the 2014 season.

=== Philadelphia Soul ===
On February 26, 2015, Bostic was assigned to the Philadelphia Soul of the AFL.

=== New Orleans VooDoo ===
On May 11, 2015, Bostic was traded to the New Orleans VooDoo for Daverin Geralds.
