= E. J. Underwood =

American gridiron football player (born 1983)

No. 41, 4
- Position: Defensive back

Personal information
- Born: August 4, 1983 (age 43); Cincinnati, Ohio, U.S.
- Listed height: 6 ft 1 in (1.85 m)
- Listed weight: 185 lb (84 kg)

Career information
- High school: Hamilton (OH)
- College: Pikeville
- NFL draft: 2006: undrafted

Career history
- New York Giants (2006–2007); New York Jets (2007)*; Buffalo Bills (2007–2008)*; Cleveland Gladiators (2008); Edmonton Eskimos (2009)*; Cleveland Gladiators (2010)*; Cincinnati Commandos (2010, 2012); Texas Revolution (2013); Marion Blue Racers (2014)
- * Offseason or practice squad member only

Awards and highlights
- BCS national champion (2002); 1st Team All-CIFL (2010); CIFL champion (2010); UIFL champion (2012); 1st Team All-UIFL North (2012)

Career AFL statistics
- Total tackles: 9
- Stats at ArenaFan.com

E. J. Underwood (born August 4, 1983) is an American former football defensive back.

== Early life ==
As a prep, Underwood attended Hamilton High School. His football abilities were so good that he received a 4-star prospect rating according to Rivals.com. He received NCAA Division I scholarship offers from Georgia Tech, Minnesota, Ohio State, Penn State, and Pittsburgh.

== College career ==
=== Ohio State ===
He played college football at Ohio State. He was a member of the 2002 NCAA National Championship team that defeated Miami (FL) in the national title game.

=== Pikeville ===
For his senior season, Underwood transferred to the University of Pikeville in Pikeville, Kentucky. Pikeville is an NAIA Institution. At the time, they were ranked 7th in the nation. The Bears finished 7-3 that season.

== Professional career ==
=== New York Giants ===
He was signed by the New York Giants as an undrafted free agent in 2006 and spent the entire season on the team's injured reserve list due to an injured shoulder.

In 2007, he was once again injured in the preseason, this time with a broken jaw. He was later released.

=== New York Jets ===
Two days after his Giants release, Underwood was a member of the New York Jets' practice squad. He was released a little over a month later.

=== Buffalo Bills ===
In December, he was signed by the Buffalo Bills and added to their practice squad for the remainder of the season.

The next year the Bills re-signed Underwood, but later released him.

=== Cleveland Gladiators ===
In 2008, he played for the Cleveland Gladiators of Arena Football League.

And again in 2010, he was a member of the team, but was released after 2 months, and did not see any playing time.

=== Edmonton Eskimos ===
In 2009, Underwood signed to play with the Edmonton Eskimos of the Canadian Football League.

=== Cincinnati Commandos ===
After his release from the Gladiators, Underwood signed with the Cincinnati Commandos of the Continental Indoor Football League. The Commandos went 9–1 in the regular season, and Underwood went on to win 1st Team All-CIFL honors as a defensive back. The Commandos went on to win the CIFL Championship Game, with a 54–40 win over the Wisconsin Wolfpack.

Underwood re-signed with the Commandos for the 2012 season, as the team transferred into the United Indoor Football League.

=== Texas Revolution ===
For the 2013 season, Underwood signed with the Texas Revolution.

=== Marion Blue Racers ===
Underwood agreed to play for the Marion Blue Racers in 2014.
