= Dreher High School =

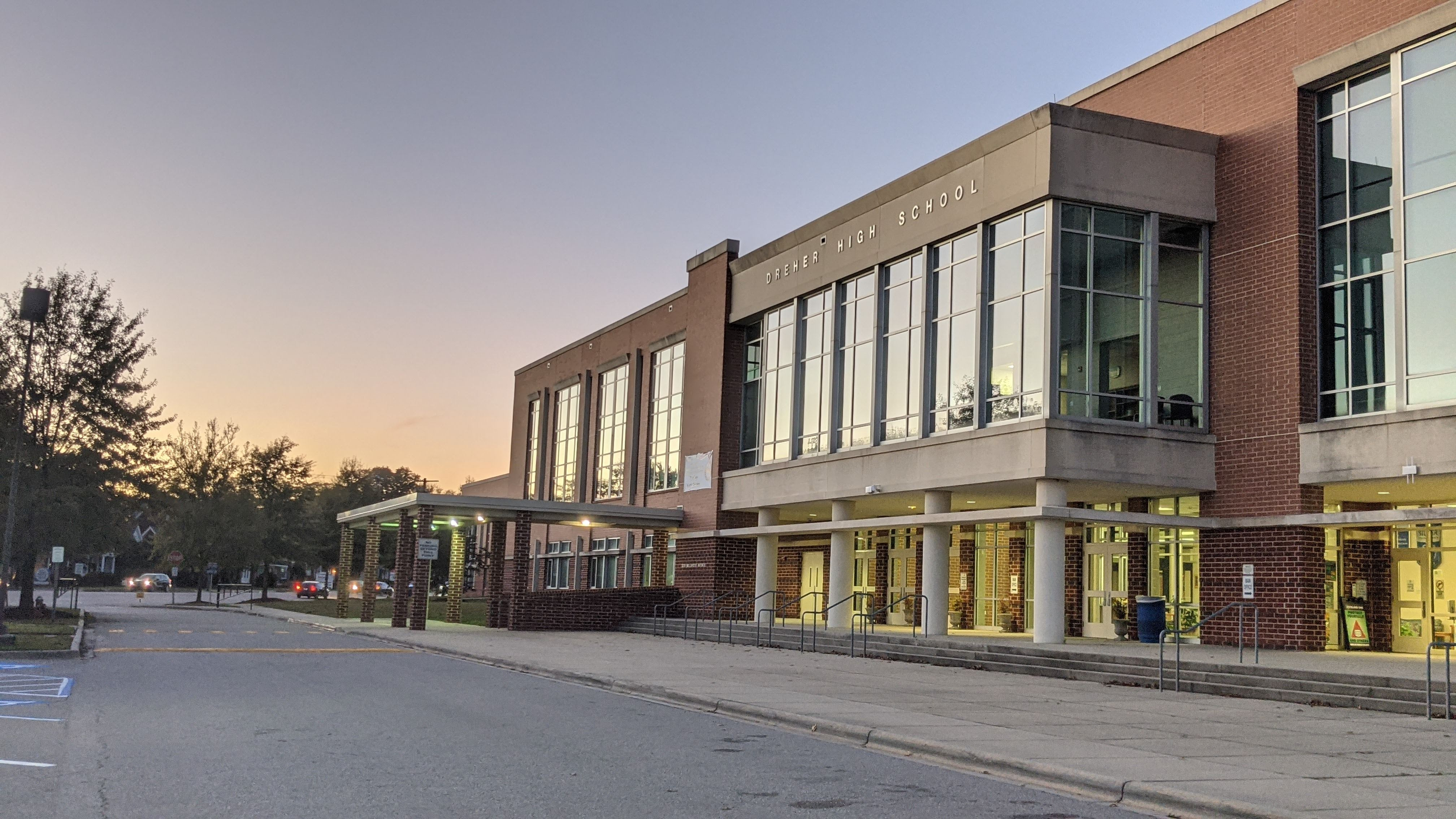

Location
- 3319 Millwood Avenue; Columbia, South Carolina 29205; United States
- Coordinates: 33°59′56″N 80°59′37″W

Information
- Type: Public high school
- Established: 1938 (88 years ago)
- School district: Richland County School District One
- Principal: Joe Eberlin
- Staff: 79.80 (FTE)
- Grades: 9–12
- Enrollment: 1,155 (2023–2024)
- Student to teacher ratio: 14.47
- Colors: Royal blue and white
- Mascot: Blue Devil
- Rival: A.C Flora High School
- Newspaper: The Blueprint www.drehernews.com
- Website: dreher.richlandone.org

Dreher High School is a co-educational four-year public high school in Richland County School District One located in Columbia, South Carolina, United States. Established in 1938, Dreher is one of the oldest public high schools in South Carolina. In 2022, Dreher was ranked the seventh-best high school in South Carolina and 1,017th in national rankings by U.S. News & World Report.

== History ==
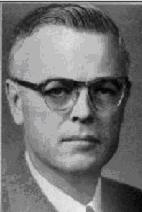
D. Leon McCormac served as the first principal of Dreher from 1938 to 1947

In 1938, the third high school in Columbia was completed. It was built at 701 Adger Road on a ten-acre lot, which was once part of Governor Wade Hampton's estate, purchased for $25,000 from Burrell D. Manning. The Mechanics Contracting Company completed construction of the new building at a cost of $239,306. The new school was named for Ernest S. Dreher, who served as the second superintendent of Columbia City Schools from 1895 to 1918. Mr. Dreher was also responsible for the building initiative that led to the construction of Columbia and Booker T. Washington High Schools.

The first principal, D. Leon McCormac, and five faculty members formulated the organization of the new school. Doors to the first facility opened in 1938, with a faculty of 30 and 651 students in grades 9–12. The first 123 students graduated in 1939. A new auditorium, the south wing, was completed in 1954. With the completion of this wing, Dreher was an enclosed facility with a central courtyard. Through the efforts of several classes, the courtyard became a focal point of the school, complete with statuary and a fountain. From the air, the Dreher complex had a block “D” appearance.

In 1962, Dreher became the first school in Columbia to offer Russian as a foreign-language class. Two years later the first black students to enroll at Dreher were Oliver Washington and Brenda Fruster, as part of the Freedom of Choice plan in 1964. Both went on to graduate from Dreher in 1968.

=== SCETV ===
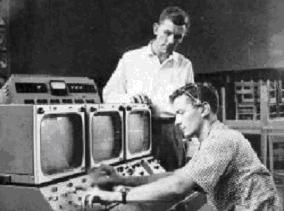
Dewey Gentry (L) observes Henry J. Cauthen (R), technical director, switching equipment of the closed-circuit ETV Experiment in 1958 at Dreher

In 1958, the S. C. General Assembly authorized an experiment in use of television to teach with closed-circuit instructional productions originating from the library at Dreher High School. R. Lynn Kalmbach was the principal. In one of the first programs, Dreher teacher, Lucille Turney-High taught French. The S. C. Educational Television Commission (SCETV) was created by the General Assembly in 1960 and SCETV moved from Dreher several blocks away. Dreher's principal was named its first president. R. Lynn Kalmbach died in 1965. SCETV's Columbia transmitter, WRLK, was named for Kalmbach, as well as Dreher's original gymnasium until renaming in 2002.

=== New building ===
In November 2002, a $381 million bond referendum passed for school construction in Richland District One. The original Dreher High School complex had been existing for sixty-four years. The condition of the physical plant, the inadequacies of space and classroom size, as well as the technological shortfalls of the old school made the construction of a new facility necessary.

Construction began in June 2005. Construction continued for two years followed by the demolition of the old school from June 7 until August 8. Occupancy of the new facilities took place on August 16, 2007, with a new address of 3319 Millwood Avenue.

The new $42,000,000 complex has 80,000 more square feet of floor space, a large commons area, a 2,000-seat air competition gymnasium, classrooms, meeting facilities, a Navy JROTC suite, arts facilities, an auditorium and a media center. Athletic facilities were added at Memorial Stadium. Parking for students and staff is provided on campus. The architecture reflects the tradition of the old school including an interior courtyard with the dolphin fountain and other artifacts. The new school incorporates a covered seating area, a wall built from bricks of the old building with some of its seals and plaques and a lamppost donated by alumni. Additional reminders of Dreher's proud past include statuary and the extensive art gallery (professional and student works) that was accumulated through the efforts of various school organizations, graduating classes, and donations from many benefactors.

The school has 1,184 enrolled student and is classified AAA by the SCHSL.

=== Student numbers ===
- 1938 – 651
- 1941 – 854
- 1957 – 1,278
- 2001 – 1,246
- 2009 – 1,302
- 2017 – 1,583
- The smallest graduating class at Dreher came in 1948, when 41 students graduated.
- The largest graduating class was 1960, when 453 students graduated.
- In its first 60 years Dreher has graduated more than 15,000 students and produced more than 300 National Merit Scholarship Finalists.

== Academics ==
In 2000 Dreher's feeder school, Hand Middle School, was awarded by Time magazine one of three Schools of the Year and was favorably covered in a feature article.

=== Academic honors ===
America's Best High Schools by Newsweek

- 2008, 2009, 2010

Red Carpet School

- 2005

Flagship School of Promise

- 2005

== Non-athletic titles ==
Dreher has a tradition of excellence in Debate including former National Forensic League Debate championship by Jean H. Toal and Susan Copenhaver.

In 1997, Dreher's production of Waiting for the Parade starring Anna Camp and Katie Robbins won the South Carolina Theater Association competition and represented South Carolina at the South East Regional Theater Competition in Birmingham, Alabama.

In January 2022, readers of the State Newspaper voted the Dreher High School Marching Band, led by Christopher Lee and Jordan Knight, as being the Best Band in the State of South Carolina. Dreher won with 54% of the vote and over 76,000 total votes.

In February 2022, Dreher's drama department (Thespian Troupe 3940) won the chapter select at the Palmetto Dramatic Association One Act Competition for their production of Dwayne Hartford's The Miraculous Journey of Edward Tulane, and went on to represent the state of South Carolina at the International Thespian Festival in Bloomington, Indiana. The show was directed by theatre teacher Kathleen Pennyway, assistant directed by student Walker Weaver, costumed by student Zoe Barber, and was performed by students Francis Judge, Melody Driggers, Sofia Jones, William Barr, Nick Godby, Dazah Crouder Gantt, Dante Vega, Zamirah Smith, Amelia Lacy, Dorthanius Slade, and Mary Des Parker.

== Athletic titles ==
- Boys' football
  - State Champions: 1951, 1956, 1957, 1959
- Boys' basketball
  - State Champions: 1956, 1957, 1961, 1963, 1979
  - Region Champions: 1979, 1999, 2000, 2001, 2002, 2003, 2004, 2008, 2009
- Girls' basketball
  - State Champions: 1969, 1981, 1994, 2001, 2003, 2012, 2014, 2016
  - Runners-up: 2002
  - Region Champions:1969, 1977, 1983, 1984, 1988, 1989, 1995, 1998, 1999, 2000, 2001, 2002, 2003, 2009, 2010
- Track and field
  - State Champions: 2003, 2012
- Boys State Runner-up': 2002
- Boys' Cross Country
  - State Champions: 2022
- Girls' Soccer
  - State Champions: 2002, 2015
- Boys' soccer
  - State Champions: 2019
  - Runners-up: 1999, 2006
  - Region Champions: 1968, 1976, 1977, 1983, 1986, 1988, 1991, 1994, 1995, 1997, 1998, 1999, 2000, 2001, 2002, 2003, 2004, 2005, 2006, 2007, 2008, 2010, 2011
- Boys' baseball
  - State Champions: 1969
- Boys' wrestling
  - State Champions: 1988
- Marching Band
  - Lower-State Runners-Up: 2021

== Notable alumni ==
=== Athletics ===
- Tramaine Billie, former linebacker at Clemson
- Alex English, NBA Hall of Famer, Class of 1972
- Corey Jenkins, former professional football player for the Miami Dolphins and Chicago Bears as well as a first-round draft choice playing baseball for the Boston Red Sox minor league system, Class of 1995
- Jacory Patterson, track and field athlete, class of 2018
- Gerald Perry, former NFL offensive tackle, Class of 1983

=== Arts and entertainment ===
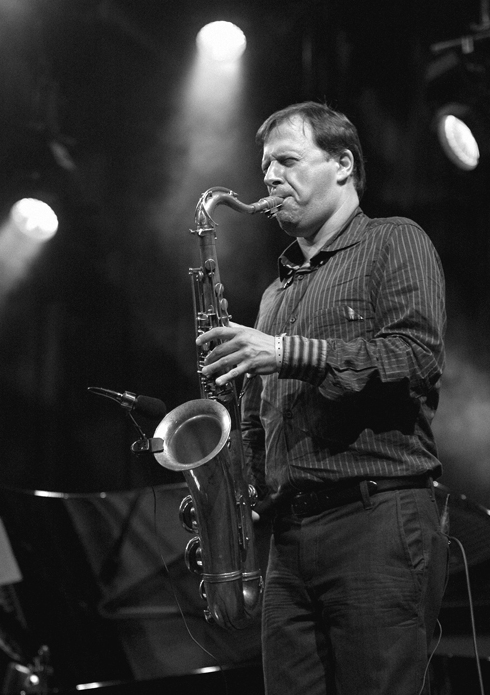
Chris Potter, Class of 1989

- Anna Camp, actress; did not graduate, but attended for from 1996 to 1999
- Michael Flessas, actor, Palme d'Or (Golden Palm) winning film Dancer in the Dark at the Cannes Film Festival
- Helen Hill, artist, activist, and murder victim, Class of 1988
- Warren Edward Johnson, or Blue Sky is a painter and artist famous for Tunnelvision, Class of 1956
- Chris Potter, jazz saxophonist and composer, Grammy Award nominee, Class of 1989
- Terry Rosen, jazz guitarist and radio personality, Class of 1957

=== Crime ===
- Dylann Roof, perpetrator of the Charleston church shooting, attended briefly while he was in the ninth grade, did not graduate

=== Government ===
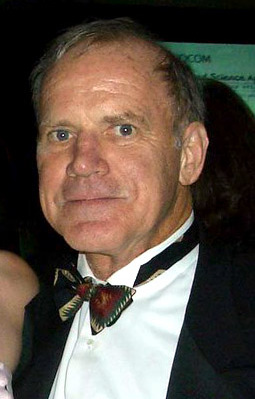
Kary Mullis, Class of 1962

- Bob Coble, Columbia Mayor for over 20 years, Class of 1971
- Darrell Jackson, SC State Senator, Class of 1975
- Alex Sanders, Former chief judge of the South Carolina Court of Appeals and 19th President of the College of Charleston, Class of 1957
- Robert L. Sumwalt, Chairman of the National Transportation Safety Board
- Jean H. Toal, Chief Justice of the South Carolina Supreme Court, Class of 1961

=== Media ===
- Kathleen Parker, Columnist, Class of 1969
- Teddy Heffner, sportswriter and sports talk host, Class of 1969.

=== Scholar/education ===
- Tyrone Hayes, American biologist and professor of Integrative Biology at University of California, Berkeley, Class of 1985
- Kary Mullis, Nobel Prize Laureate, Class of 1962
- Alex Sanders, 19th President of the College of Charleston, Class of 1964
- Robb Willer, American social psychologist at Stanford University, Class of 1995
