= Terrill Byrd =

American football player (born 1986)

No. 95
- Position: Defensive tackle

Personal information
- Born: October 8, 1986 (age 40); Cincinnati, Ohio, U.S.
- Listed height: 6 ft 0 in (1.83 m)
- Listed weight: 280 lb (127 kg)

Career information
- High school: Cincinnati (OH) Colerain
- College: Cincinnati
- NFL draft: 2009: undrafted

Career history
- Cincinnati Commandos (2010–2012); Cleveland Gladiators (2013); Marion Blue Racers (2014)

Awards and highlights
- Second-team All-American (2007); First-team All-CIFL (2010)

Career AFL statistics
- Tackles: 3
- Sacks: 1
- Stats at ArenaFan.com

Terrill Byrd (born October 8, 1986) is an American former professional football defensive tackle. Byrd completed his college career at University of Cincinnati.
