= Tramaine Billie =

American football player (born 1983)

No. 20
- Position: Linebacker / running back

Personal information
- Born: November 15, 1983 (age 42); Columbia, South Carolina
- Listed height: 6 ft 0 in (1.83 m)
- Listed weight: 225 lb (102 kg)

Career information
- High school: Columbia (SC) Dreher
- College: Clemson
- NFL draft: 2008: undrafted

Career history
- Fort Wayne FireHawks (2010)

Awards and highlights
- First-team All-CIFL (2010); Co-Defensive MVP CIFL (2010)

Tramaine Billie (born November 15, 1983) is an American former football player. He graduated from Clemson University, and played professionally in 2010 for the Fort Wayne FireHawks of the Continental Indoor Football League, where he was named Co-Defensive MVP of the league.

== Early life ==
Billie attended Dreher High School in Columbia, South Carolina, where he was coached by Bill Bacon. Billie played two seasons at linebacker before moving to running back his junior season, in which he rushed for 2,003 yards (school record) and 19 touchdowns and also made 52 tackles. As a senior, he rushed for 1,000 yards in the first five games of the 2002 season with an offensive line that did not have a returning starter, after missing two games with a sprained ankle, Billie ended his senior season with 1,570 yards and 17 touchdowns in just eight games; also added 58 tackles, including two sacks, three caused fumbles, and a blocked kick, good enough to make him a Mr. Football finalist, and earn him and appearance in the North-South All-Star Game. He set the school career rushing mark with 4,073 yards and 43 touchdowns. He was also a two-year letterman in Basketball and five-time letterman in track (AAA state champion in the 100m in 2002).

College recruiting
Name	Hometown	School	Height	Weight	40^{‡}	Commit date
Tramaine Billie; RB	Columbia, South Carolina	Dreher High School	6 ft 1 in (1.85 m)	192 lb (87 kg)	4.45	Jul 8, 2003
Tramaine Billie; RB	Recruit ratings: Scout: Rivals:					
Overall recruit ranking: Scout: 69 (RB) Rivals: -- (ATH), 7 (SC)
‡ Refers to 40-yard dash; Note: In many cases, Scout, Rivals, 247Sports, On3, and ESPN may conflict in their listings of height, weight and 40 time.; In these cases, the average was taken. ESPN grades are on a 100-point scale.; Sources: "2003 Team Ranking". Rivals.com.

Billie committed to Clemson University on July 8, 2003. Billie's lone other FBS football scholarship came from the University of South Carolina.

== College career ==
Billie saw limited playing time as a freshman in 2003, but 2004 brought on a starting role for him. He finished the season with 62 tackles (5th on the team). In 2005, he was once again the starter as strongside linebacker, this time he 93 tackles finished 3rd on the team. In 2006, he Red-shirted after suffering a broken ankle in an August 18 practice. He was receiving strong draft consideration before this injury, but eventually fell out of favor with NFL teams and did not make it to camp.

=== Statistics ===
		Defensive										
Season	Team	GP	Solo Tkl	Asst Tkl	Total Tkl	Sacks	FF	INT	Yds	Avg	Long	TD
2004	Clemson	11	27	27	54	1.0	0	1	0	0.0	0	0
2005	Clemson	12	37	34	71	1.0	0	0	0	0.0	0	0
2006	Clemson	0	0	0	0	0	0	0	0	0.0	0	0
2007	Clemson	13	41	27	68	1.0	0	0	0	0.0	0	0
	Totals	36	105	88	193	3.0	0	1	0	0	0	0

== Professional career ==
In 2010, Billie signed with the Fort Wayne FireHawks to play indoor football. At the time, Billie was in South Carolina coaching and training young athletes and was recruited by Donnie Caldwell. He led the team to a 6–4 regular-season record and a third seed in the playoffs. Billie was a two-way player. He tallied 12 carries for 34 yards and six touchdowns as a running back, and as a linebacker he had 66.5 tackles, one sack, one forced fumble, three fumble recoveries, four interceptions, including three for touchdowns. He was named Co-Defensive MVP of the league.
