= 2007 Colorado Crush season =

Arena Football League team season

- Owner: John Elway; Pat Bowlen; Stan Kroenke
- General manager: John Elway
- Head coach: Mike Dailey
- Home stadium: Pepsi Center

Results
- Record: 8–8
- Division place: 3rd
- Playoffs: L 76–67 vs. San Jose

The 2007 Colorado Crush season was the fifth season for the franchise. They look to make the playoffs again, as they were 11–5 and division champs in 2006. They went 8–8 and qualified for the playoffs. After an upset over the Brigade, the Crush lost 76–67 to the San Jose SaberCats in the divisional round.

== Schedule ==
Week	Date	Opponent	Home/Away Game	Result
1	March 4	Grand Rapids Rampage	Home	L 44–42
2	March 10	Kansas City Brigade	Home	W 44–40
3	March 16	Arizona Rattlers	Home	W 56–54
4	March 22	Philadelphia Soul	Away	L 71–47
5	April 1	Nashville Kats	Home	W 55–48
6	April 6	San Jose SaberCats	Away	L 72–44
7	April 15	New York Dragons	Away	W 49–48
8	April 20	Las Vegas Gladiators	Home	W 63–53
9	April 27	Kansas City Brigade	Away	W 45–42
10	May 7	Chicago Rush	Away	L 59–48
11	May 11	Nashville Kats	Away	W 57–35
12	May 18	Columbus Destroyers	Home	W 58–40
13	May 26	Grand Rapids Rampage	Away	L 58–56
14	June 4	Utah Blaze	Away	L 51–14
15		Bye	Week	
16	June 18	Chicago Rush	Home	L 66–57
17	June 25	Dallas Desperados	Home	L 77–58

== Playoff schedule ==
Round	Date	Opponent	Home/Away	Result
1	June 30	(3) Kansas City Brigade	Away	W 49–42
2	July 7	(1) San Jose SaberCats	Away	L 76–67

== Coaching ==
Mike Dailey started his fourth season as head coach of the Crush.

== Stats ==
=== Offense ===
==== Quarterback ====
Player	Comp.	Att.	Comp%	Yards	TD's	INT's	Long	Rating
John Dutton	396	645	61.4	4320	84	17	45	102.7

==== Running backs ====
Player	Car.	Yards	Avg.	TD's	Long
John Dutton	8	44	5.5	1	22
Robert Thomas	29	29	1	9	4
Anthony Dunn	7	11	1.6	0	9
John Peaua	7	10	1.4	1	3
Brandon Kirsch	2	8	4	2	5
Saul Patu	4	5	1.3	1	3
Robert Redd	4	0	0	0	7
Jason Harmon	10	−2	-.2	3	2
Alonzo Nix	1	−3	−3	0	−3

==== Wide receivers ====
Player	Rec.	Yards	Avg.	TD's	Long
Damian Harrell	132	1537	11.7	47	45
Brad Pyatt	95	1169	12.3	19	46
Willie Quinnie	72	844	11.7	14	42
Robert Redd	62	547	8.8	5	34
Alonzo Nix	50	509	10.2	3	34
Robert Thomas	2	18	9	0	19
John Peaua	2	11	5.5	1	9
Anthony Dunn	1	7	7	0	7
Chris Watton	1	1	1	0	1
Brandon Kirsch	1	0	0	0	0

==== Touchdowns ====
Player	TD's	Rush	Rec	Ret	Pts
Damian Harrell	47	0	47	0	282
Brad Pyatt	19	0	19	0	114
Willie Quinnie	14	0	14	0	84
Robert Thomas	9	9	0	0	56
Robert Reed	5	0	5	0	32
Jason Harmon	4	3	0	1	24
Alonzo Nix	3	0	3	0	18
Brandon Kirsch	2	2	0	0	12
John Peaua	2	1	1	0	12
John Dutton	1	1	0	0	6
Saul Patu	1	1	0	0	6

=== Defense ===
Player	Tackles	Solo	Assisted	Sack	Solo	Assisted	INT	Yards	TD's	Long
Rashad Floyd	156	141	30	0	0	0	9	111	2	25
Chris Angel	88	78	20	0	0	0	7	95	0	30
Jason Harmon	49	43	12	0	0	0	2	11	0	9
Robert Thomas	46.5	35	23	0	0	0	0	0	0	0
Anthony Dunn	36	21	30	4	3	2	1	0	0	0
Saul Patu	35.5	25	21	3.5	2	3	0	0	0	0
Delvin Hughley	21.5	16	11	0	0	0	1	1	0	1
Dustin Barno	14	9	10	5	4	2	0	0	0	0
Chris Snyder	13.5	10	7	2.5	2	1	0	0	0	0
Brad Pyatt	11.5	10	3	0	0	0	0	0	0	0
Robert Redd	7	5	4	0	0	0	0	0	0	0
Chris Watton	6.5	6	1	0	0	0	0	0	0	0
Jason Ball	5.5	4	3	0	0	0	0	0	0	0
Quinn Dorsey	4.5	2	5	1	1	0	0	0	0	0
John Peaua	4.5	3	3	0	0	0	0	0	0	0
Damian Harrell	4	4	0	0	0	0	0	0	0	0
Alonzo Nix	3	2	2	0	0	0	0	0	0	0
Brett Huyser	2.5	2	1	0	0	0	0	0	0	0
Brandon Kirsch	2	2	0	0	0	0	0	0	0	0
John Dutton	1	1	0	0	0	0	0	0	0	0

=== Special teams ===
==== Kick return ====
Player	Ret	Yards	TD's	Long	Avg	Ret	Yards	TD's	Long	Avg
Jason Harmon	47	1010	1	55	21.5	1	0	0	0	0
Robert Redd	12	118	0	22	9.8	0	0	0	0	0
Brad Pyatt	3	53	0	20	17.7	0	0	0	0	0
Rashad Floyd	4	51	0	16	12.8	3	78	0	30	26
Damien Harrell	7	21	0	14	3	0	0	0	0	0
Willie Quinnie	2	13	0	13	6.5	0	0	0	0	0

==== Kicking ====
Player	Extra pt.	Extra pt. Att.	FG	FGA	Long	Pct.	Pts
Jason Ball	90	105	17	28	38	0.607	141

== Playoff Stats ==
=== Offense ===
==== Quarterback ====
Player	Comp.	Att.	Comp%	Yards	TD's	INT's

==== Running backs ====
Player	Car.	Yards	Avg.	TD's	Long

==== Wide receivers ====
Player	Rec.	Yards	Avg.	TD's	Long

=== Special teams ===
==== Kick return ====
Player	Ret	Yards	Avg	Long

==== Kicking ====
Player	Extra pt.	Extra pt. Att.	FG	FGA	Long	Pts

== Regular season ==
=== Week 1: vs Grand Rapids Rampage ===
	1	2	3	4	Total
GR	13	7	21	3	44
COL	21	7	0	14	42

at Pepsi Center, Denver, Colorado

Scoring Summary:

1st Quarter:

2nd Quarter:

3rd Quarter:

4th Quarter:

=== Week 2: vs Kansas City Brigade ===
	1	2	3	4	Total
KC	7	7	13	13	40
COL	3	17	7	17	44

at Pepsi Center, Denver, Colorado

Scoring Summary:

1st Quarter:

2nd Quarter:

3rd Quarter:

4th Quarter:

=== Week 3: vs Arizona Rattlers ===
	1	2	3	4	Total
ARI	7	20	14	13	54
COL	14	21	7	14	56

at Pepsi Center, Denver, Colorado

Scoring Summary:

1st Quarter:

2nd Quarter:

3rd Quarter:

4th Quarter:

=== Week 4: at Philadelphia Soul ===
	1	2	3	4	Total
COL	13	14	13	7	47
PHI	13	14	21	23	71

at Wachovia Center, Philadelphia, Pennsylvania

Scoring Summary:

1st Quarter:

2nd Quarter:

3rd Quarter:

4th Quarter:

=== Week 5: vs Nashville Kats ===
	1	2	3	4	Total
NSH	7	21	13	7	48
COL	7	17	3	28	55

at Pepsi Center, Denver, Colorado

Scoring Summary:

1st Quarter:

2nd Quarter:

3rd Quarter:

4th Quarter:

=== Week 6: at San Jose SaberCats ===
	1	2	3	4	Total
COL	3	7	26	8	44
SJ	14	24	21	13	72

at HP Pavilion at San Jose, San Jose, California

Scoring Summary:

1st Quarter:

2nd Quarter:

3rd Quarter:

4th Quarter:

=== Week 7: at New York Dragons ===
	1	2	3	4	Total
COL	6	19	14	10	49
NYD	7	6	14	21	48

at Nassau Veterans Memorial Coliseum, Uniondale, New York

Scoring Summary:

1st Quarter:

2nd Quarter:

3rd Quarter:

4th Quarter:

=== Week 8: vs Las Vegas Gladiators ===
	1	2	3	4	Total
LV	13	20	0	20	53
COL	3	21	26	13	63

at Pepsi Center, Denver, Colorado

Scoring Summary:

1st Quarter:

2nd Quarter:

3rd Quarter:

4th Quarter:

=== Week 9: at Kansas City Brigade ===
	1	2	3	4	Total
COL	14	10	7	14	45
KC	7	14	7	14	42

at Kemper Arena, Kansas City, Missouri

Scoring Summary:

1st Quarter:

2nd Quarter:

3rd Quarter:

4th Quarter:

=== Week 10: at Chicago Rush ===
	1	2	3	4	Total
COL	13	20	7	8	48
CHI	0	28	21	10	59

at Allstate Arena, Chicago, Illinois

Scoring Summary:

1st Quarter:

2nd Quarter:

3rd Quarter:

4th Quarter:

=== Week 11: at Nashville Kats ===
	1	2	3	4	Total
COL	13	17	14	13	57
NSH	0	14	14	7	35

at Nashville Arena, Nashville, Tennessee

Scoring Summary:

1st Quarter:

2nd Quarter:

3rd Quarter:

4th Quarter:

=== Week 12: vs Columbus Destroyers ===
	1	2	3	4	Total
CLB	6	14	0	20	40
COL	14	21	6	17	58

at Pepsi Center, Denver, Colorado

Scoring Summary:

1st Quarter:

2nd Quarter:

3rd Quarter:

4th Quarter:

=== Week 13: at Grand Rapids Rampage ===
	1	2	3	4	Total
COL	10	13	7	26	56
GR	14	14	14	16	58

at Van Andel Arena, Grand Rapids, Michigan

Scoring Summary:

1st Quarter:

2nd Quarter:

3rd Quarter:

4th Quarter:

=== Week 14: at Utah Blaze ===
	1	2	3	4	Total
COL	7	0	0	7	14
UTA	14	17	6	14	51

at EnergySolutions Arena, Salt Lake City, Utah

Scoring Summary:

1st Quarter:

2nd Quarter:

3rd Quarter:

4th Quarter:

=== Week 16: vs Chicago Rush ===
	1	2	3	4	Total
CHI	7	28	10	21	66
COL	10	14	7	26	57

at Pepsi Center, Denver, Colorado

Scoring Summary:

1st Quarter:

2nd Quarter:

3rd Quarter:

4th Quarter:

=== Week 17: vs Dallas Desperados ===
	1	2	3	4	Total
DAL	21	21	21	14	77
COL	10	13	14	21	58

at Pepsi Center, Denver, Colorado

Scoring Summary:

1st Quarter:

2nd Quarter:

3rd Quarter:

4th Quarter:

== Playoffs ==
=== Week 1: vs (3) Kansas City Brigade ===
	1	2	3	4	Total
(6) COL	16	7	7	19	49
(3) KC	7	21	0	14	42

Scoring Summary:

1st Quarter:

2nd Quarter:

3rd Quarter:

4th Quarter:

=== Week 2: vs (1) San Jose SaberCats ===
	1	2	3	4	Total
(6) COL	7	28	13	19	67
(1) SJ	7	27	21	21	76

Scoring Summary:

1st Quarter:

2nd Quarter:

3rd Quarter:

4th Quarter:
