= Fort Wayne FireHawks =

Logo

General information
- Founded: 2009
- Folded: 2011
- Headquartered: Allen County War Memorial Coliseum in Fort Wayne, Indiana
- Colors: Black, red, white

Personnel
- Owners: Championship Sports Enterprises, LLC
- General manager: J. Michael Loomis
- Head coach: Willie Davis Jr.
- President: J. Michael Loomis

Team history
- Fort Wayne FireHawks (2010)

Home fields
- Allen County War Memorial Coliseum (2010)

League / conference affiliations
- Continental Indoor Football League (2010)

Playoff appearances (1)
- 2010

The Fort Wayne FireHawks were a professional indoor football team based in Fort Wayne, Indiana. The team joined the Continental Indoor Football League as an expansion team during the 2010 season. The FireHawks were the fourth attempt at indoor football in Fort Wayne after the original Fort Wayne Freedom (NIFL & UIF, 2003–06), Fort Wayne Fusion (af2, 2007), and the second Fort Wayne Freedom (CIFL, 2008–09). The Owner of the FireHawks was Championship Sports Enterprises LLC. The FireHawks played their home games at the Allen County War Memorial Coliseum.

The team saw financial problems before the season had started, when Co-owner and General Manager, John Christner, was unable to stay with the team. As a result, J. Michael Loomis became the sole owner and only principal of Championship Sports Enterprises. With Christner's departure, Loomis became general manager, handling day-to-day operations of the team. Following the 2010 season, Loomis attempted to find additional investors or buyers of the team, without success. The team sat out the 2011 season. Before the 2011 season ended, Loomis sought to reorganize the CIFL, but when those negotiations broke down, Loomis decided against rejoining the CIFL. There were media reports that the FireHawks, along with several members of the CIFL, were going to form the Stadius Football Association (SFA), to be based in Indianapolis. The SFA was a concept that Loomis originated, but he got no traction with other team owners in his effort to put it together. The new league did not materialize after two teams, Marion and Cincinnati, joined the United Indoor Football League almost as quickly as the press release was floated. Thereafter, the FireHawks did not attempt to re-join the CIFL, nor did it join another league.

== Franchise history ==
=== 2010 ===
During the Fort Wayne Freedom 2009 season, the owners sought legal assistance. There were few, if any, written contracts; there was no accounting; and, many of the "deals" had been made on a handshake. They retained J. Michael Loomis. They racked up a legal bill and were unable to pay it. Loomis attempted to amicably resolve the situation, but was unable to do so. He ended up seeking a judgment, and obtained one. The owners would or could not pay it. Loomis put the team in receivership and attempted to sell it, but by this time, the reputation of the team had become somewhat negative. Loomis took the team out of receivership, and contacted another creditor of the team, John Christner, who was owed a similar amount of money that he had invested at various points of the recent history of the team. Christner originally promised to run the team as Loomis addressed the legal issues, but Christner was going through a difficult divorce involving small children, and Christner was unable to devote any time to the Freedom issues as a result. Loomis then took over the entire effort, with no other backing. By November, 2009, he changed the name of the team, found new sponsors, and signed many new players. The "FireHawks" were announced as the succession team to the Freedom, and kept the team in the Continental Indoor Football League ("CIFL"). Owner J. Michael Loomis acquired the assets left from the Fort Wayne Freedom franchise as part of the judgment obtained by Championship Sports Enterprises, LLC. Loomis' named Willie Davis as head coach, primarily because of the way that the former Freedom owners had treated Davis, firing Davis as he was about to board the team bus headed for an away game. On December 9, 2009, it was confirmed that Loomis and Christner would take over the entities that used to run the Freedom. Before the season started, the team announced they had signed Katie Hnida as the team's placekicker. Hnida is best known for becoming the first woman to score a point in an NCAA football game and speaking out during the recruiting scandal at her first school, the University of Colorado.

The FireHawks suffered a loss in their first game as a franchise April 2, 2010, a 55–27 loss to the Cincinnati Commandos. During the game, the FireHawks also lost their quarterback, Adam Gibson, during the game, leaving the FireHawks searching for another quarterback before the next week. The FireHawks earned their first victory April 10, 2010, 44–28 against the Miami Valley Silverbacks, as new quarterback, Kota Carone-Colors, paced the team with seven touchdown passes. Throughout the season the team experienced many ups and downs, none lower than a 0–49 defeat at the hands of the Wisconsin Wolfpack. The FireHawks' showed no effects from the front office problems, as the following week the team came out and defeated the Chicago Cardinals 69–45, but the team played without Hnida, as a blood clot on her foot put her out for the season. The FireHawks got a quick chance at revenge against the Wolfpack, but they failed losing 32–33 as they couldn't score from the 1-yard line with seconds left, when backup quarterback Mike Whitaker's pass sailed over the hands of Jermaine Woolfolk. The FireHawks would win their next game against Miami Valley, 26–8. During the week before the team's first game at the Marion Mayhem, Loomis stated that the team would continue to play despite its mounting financial struggles. The Mayhem, who were having financial problems of their own, forced the FireHawks next game back to June 12. The FireHawks would continue their season the following week against the undefeated Commandos, losing 49–46 after leading by 12 with 4:12 left in the game. The team was scheduled to play the Mayhem the next week, but the franchise folded. The folding of Marion credited the FireHawks with two forfeit wins. but it cost the FireHawks a significant amount in revenue from a home game, practically sealing the fate of the struggling FireHawks. Several Marion players were signed by Fort Wayne for the FireHawks' playoff run. The FireHawks shutout the Chicago Cardinals 48–0. The FireHawks finished 6–4 during the 2010 Continental Indoor Football League season, earning a third-seed in the playoffs. In the only playoff game in team history, the FireHawks lost to the second-seeded Wisconsin 25–24. According to The Journal Gazette, former players say they are still owed from the 2010 season. Team owner Mike Loomis did not confirm or deny the reports in that article. The team drew about 2,000 fans per game, according to CIFL stats. After the season, Loomis tried to sell the team, but found no interested parties. Loomis had attempted to orchestrate a meeting with the CIFL owners and all team owners during the 2010 season in order to change the business model of the CIFL before the 2011 season, but the league owners rebuffed his efforts.

=== 2011 ===
Loomis failed to find investors for the team after the 2010 season. In December 2010, months after the 2010 season had ended, owner J. Michael Loomis issued a statement saying that the team would not play in 2011, stopping short of suspending operations. Loomis did say he would try to regroup for 2012. On June 30, 2011, press reports stated the FireHawks would be returning, in the newly formed Stadius Football Association. The SFA never materialized and the teams named to the league have since joined other leagues. Meanwhile, the CIFL changed ownership in 2012, suspended operations in 2014, and then folded in 2015.

== Season-by-season ==
Season records
Season	W	L	T	Finish	Playoff results
Fort Wayne FireHawks (CIFL)
2010	6	4	0	3rd	Lost Semifinals (Wisconsin Wolfpack)
Totals	6	5	0	(including playoffs)	

== Head coaches ==
Name	Term	Regular season				Playoffs		Awards
Name	Term	W	L	T	Win%	W	L	Awards
Willie Davis Jr.	2010	6	4	0	.600	0	1	

== Notable players ==
See Category:Fort Wayne FireHawks players

== Franchise leaders ==
=== Career/season records ===
==== Passing ====
- Completions: Kota-Carone Colors (71)
- Attempts: Kota-Carone Colors (155)
- Touchdowns: Kota-Carone Colors (14)
- Interceptions: Kota-Carone Colors (9)
- Yards: Kota-Carone Colors (694)
- Completion percentage: Kota-Carone Colors (45.8)
- QB Rating: Kota-Carone Colors (92.3)
- Average yards per game: Kota-Carone Colors (86.8)

==== Rushing ====
- Attempts: Kota-Carone Colors (42)
- Yards: Kota-Carone Colors (235)
- Average yards per carry: Justin Wynn (9.0)
- Touchdowns: Tramaine Billie (6)
- Long: Justin Wynn (33)
- Average yards per game: Victor Tolbert (36.5)

==== Receiving ====
- Receptions: Justin Wynn (25)
- Yards: Justin Wynn (358)
- Average yards per reception: Kota-Carone Colors (17.0)
- Touchdowns: Justin Wynn (8)
- Long: Justin Wynn (45)
- Average yards per game: Justin Wynn (44.8)

==== Defensive ====
- Interceptions: Paul Carter (5)
- Fumble recoveries: Tramaine Billie (3)
- Total tackles: Tramaine Billie (66.5)
- Sacks: Thomas McKenzie (7.5)
- Tackles For Loss: Andrew Schrock (9.5)

==== Special teams ====
- Field goals made: 3 Tied (0)
- Field goals attempted: Brian Clawson (5)
- Kickoff returns: Brandon Walker-Roby (18)
- Kickoff return yards: Brandon Walker-Roby (320)
- Kickoff return touchdowns: Brandon Walker-Roby/Justin Wynn (1)

==== Scoring/Total offense ====
- Total touchdowns: Tramaine Billie (12)
- Total points scored: Tramaine Billie (74)
- Total offense: Kota-Carone Colors (920)
- Total offense per game: Kota-Carone Colors (115)
- All-purpose yards: Justin Wynn (663)

=== Single-game records ===
==== Passing ====
- Completions: Kota-Carone Colors (17) April 10, 2010
- Attempts: Kota-Carone Colors (32) April 16, 2010
- Touchdowns: Kota-Carone Colors (7) April 10, 2010
- Interceptions: Justin Wynn (4) April 2, 2010
- Yards: Kota-Carone Colors (200) April 10, 2010
- Long: Kota-Carone Colors (45) April 10, 2010
- Completion percentage: Kota-Carone Colors (66%) May 9, 2010

==== Rushing ====
- Attempts: Victor Tolbert (13) June 19, 2010
- Yards: Justin Wynn (85) April 2, 2010
- Touchdowns: Tramaine Billie (4) May 22, 2010
- Long: Justin Wynn (33) April 2, 2010

==== Receiving ====
- Receptions: Justin Wynn/Brandon Walker-Roby (7) Both on April 10, 2010. Walker-Roby again on April 16, 2010
- Yards: Justin Wynn (114) April 10, 2010
- Touchdowns: Justin Wynn (4) April 10, 2010
- Long: Justin Wynn (45) April 10, 2010

==== Defensive ====
- Interceptions: Terry Moore/Paul Carter (2) Moore on June 5, 2010. Carter on April 10 and May 22, 2010
- Fumble recoveries: Several Tied (1)
- Total tackles: Tramaine Billie (15) April 24, 2010
- Sacks: Broderick Johnson (5.5) June 5, 2010 (Also a CIFL single game record)
- Tackles for loss: Thomas McKenzie (6) June 5, 2010

==== Special teams ====
- Field goals made: 3 Tied (0)
- Field goals attempted: Brian Clawson (4) May 22, 2010
- Kickoff returns: Brandon Walker-Roby (7) April 16, 2010
- Kickoff return yards: Brandon Walker-Roby (137) April 24, 2010
- Kickoff return long: Justin Wynn (57) May 22, 2010
- Kickoff return touchdowns: Brandon Walker-Roby/Justin Wynn (1) Walker-Roby on April 24, 2010. Wynn on May 22, 2010
- Missed field goal return long: Mike Tatum (41) June 5, 2010

==== Scoring/Total offense ====
- Total touchdowns: Justin Wynn/Tramaine Billie (4) Wynn on April 10, 2010. Billie on May 22, 2010
- Total points scored: Tramaine Billie (32) May 22, 2010
- Total offense: Justin Wynn (118) April 10, 2010
- All-purpose: Brandon Walker-Roby (178) April 24, 2010
