= Brandon Kirsch =

American football player (born 1983)

No. 4
- Position: Quarterback

Personal information
- Born: October 13, 1983 (age 43); Lebanon, Pennsylvania, U.S.
- Listed height: 6 ft 2 in (1.88 m)
- Listed weight: 205 lb (93 kg)

Career information
- High school: Cedar Crest (Lebanon)
- College: Purdue
- NFL draft: 2006: undrafted

Career history
- Colorado Crush (2007–2008); Philadelphia Soul (2011); Reading Express (2012)*
- * Offseason or practice squad member only

Career AFL statistics
- Comp. / Att.: 26 / 46
- Passing yards: 359
- TD–INT: 7–5
- Passer rating: 80.16
- Rushing TD: 2
- Stats at ArenaFan.com

Brandon Michael Kirsch (born October 13, 1983) is an American former professional football quarterback. He played college football at Purdue University, where he would forgo his senior season to enter the 2006 NFL draft. Kirsch played for the Colorado Crush and Philadelphia Soul of the Arena Football League (AFL).

== Early life ==
Kirsch, attended Cedar Crest High School in Lebanon, Pennsylvania, where he was first team all-state, first team all-county and league Most Valuable Player as senior after completing 115 of 198 passes (58.0 percent) for 1,950 yards and 26 touchdowns. He also rushed for 515 yards on 88 carries (5.9 average) and two touchdowns. Brandon was named second team all-county both his sophomore and junior seasons and was honorable mention all-state as junior. He completed 104 of 186 passes (55.9 percent) for 1,595 yards and 20 touchdowns as junior and 78 of 162 passes (48.1 percent) for 1,178 yards and 14 touchdowns as sophomore. Career totals were 300 of 552 passing (54.3 percent) for 4,808 yards and 61 touchdowns with 241 rushes for 1,142 yards (4.7 average) and 10 touchdowns. His high school football coach was Gene Fuhrman. He also played baseball and basketball. On September 24, 2001, he signed a letter of intent to play quarterback at Purdue University. He was ranked a 4-star prospect according to Rivals.com.

College recruiting
Name	Hometown	School	Height	Weight	40^{‡}	Commit date
Brandon Kirsch; QB	Lebanon, Pennsylvania	Cedar Crest High School	6 ft 3 in (1.91 m)	190 lb (86 kg)	4.65	Jul 8, 2003
Brandon Kirsch; QB	Recruit ratings: Scout: Rivals:					
Overall recruit ranking: Scout: 21 (QB) Rivals: 12 (QB), -- (PA)
‡ Refers to 40-yard dash; Note: In many cases, Scout, Rivals, 247Sports, On3, and ESPN may conflict in their listings of height, weight and 40 time.; In these cases, the average was taken. ESPN grades are on a 100-point scale.; Sources: "Purdue Football Commitment List (27)". Rivals.; "Purdue College Football Recruiting Commits". Scout.; "Scout.com Team Recruiting Rankings". Scout.; "2002 Team Ranking". Rivals.com.

== College career ==
Kirsch started four games in 2002 as a true freshman, completing 59.0 percent of his passes for 1,067 yards with 8 touchdowns and 5 interceptions. He was also third on the team in rushing with 423 yards. Kirsch appeared in only three games his sophomore season (all as a reserve) before injuring his throwing shoulder and taking a medical redshirt. He returned in 2005 and started six games, throwing for 1,625 yards with 7 touchdowns and 7 interceptions in those games, before being benched in favor of freshman Curtis Painter. Following the benching, Kirsch caused a controversy on the team and lost popularity among fans and teammates. Kirsch chose to not return to school for his senior season, declaring himself for the 2006 NFL draft.

== Professional career ==
Kirsch was rated the 21st quarterback in the 2006 NFL draft by NFLDraftScout.com.

Pre-draft measurables
Height	Weight	40-yard dash	20-yard shuttle	Three-cone drill	Vertical jump	Broad jump
6 ft 3 in (1.91 m)	210 lb (95 kg)	4.78 s	4.34 s	6.76 s	30 in (0.76 m)	9 ft 2 in (2.79 m)
All values from Purdue Pro Day

=== Colorado Crush ===
He was not drafted by the NFL and signed with the Arena Football League's Colorado Crush. Spent two seasons with the Crush, (2007–08) where he played four total games, completing 12-of-21 passes for 179 yards and 2 touchdowns.

=== Philadelphia Soul ===
On May 20, 2011, the Philadelphia Soul signed Kirsch to fill in for Justin Allgood, who was traded to the Tulsa Talons. On June 19, 2011, it was announced that he would start in place of the struggling Ryan Vena.

=== Reading Express ===
Kirsch signed with the Reading Express of the Indoor Football League (IFL) for the 2012 season, but never played for the Express.

== Career statistics ==
=== AFL ===
Year	Team	Passing							Rushing		
Year	Team	Cmp	Att	Pct	Yds	TD	Int	Rtg	Att	Yds	TD
2007	Colorado	6	9	66.7	120	4	1	109.72	2	8	2
2008	Colorado	6	12	50.0	59	1	1	50.35	0	0	0
2011	Philadelphia	14	25	56.0	180	2	3	59.17	1	0	0
Career		26	46	56.5	359	7	5	80.16	3	8	2

=== College ===
Kirsch's career stats are as follows:

Purdue Boilermakers
Season	Passing							Rushing			
Season	Comp	Att	Yards	Pct.	TD	Int	QB rating	Att	Yards	Avg	TD
2002	79	134	1,067	59.0	8	5	138.1	72	423	5.9	3
2003	3	4	27	75.0	1	0	214.2	10	48	4.8	0
2004	58	94	711	61.7	7	3	143.4	35	88	2.5	1
2005	152	257	1,727	59.1	7	8	118.4	48	198	4.1	1
Career	292	489	3,532	59.7	23	16	129.4	165	757	4.6	5
