= Robert Redd =

American football player (born 1980)

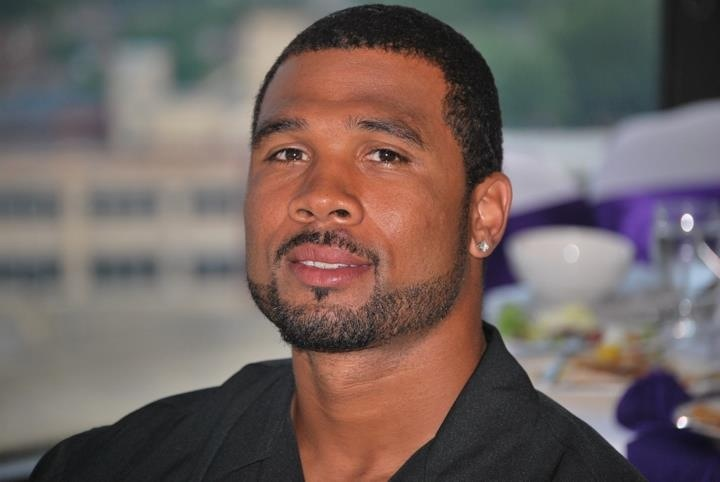

No. 1
- Position: Wide receiver

Personal information
- Born: September 1, 1980 (age 46); Dayton, Ohio, U.S.
- Listed height: 6 ft 1 in (1.85 m)
- Listed weight: 210 lb (95 kg)

Career information
- High school: Huber Heights (OH) Wayne
- College: Bowling Green
- NFL draft: 2003: undrafted

Career history
- Indianapolis Colts (2003)*; Colorado Crush (2004); Philadelphia Eagles (2005)*; Berlin Thunder (2005); Atlanta Falcons (2006)*; Berlin Thunder (2006); Colorado Crush (2007); Cleveland Gladiators (2008); Bloomington Extreme (2009); Billings Outlaws (2009); Spokane Shock (2010)*; Cincinnati Commandos (2010); Cleveland Gladiators (2011–2012); Owensboro Rage (2013)*; Dayton Sharks (2013–2014); Philadelphia Soul (2014); Nashville Venom (2014)*; Northern Kentucky Nightmare (2016); Florida Tarpons (2017–2018)
- * Offseason or practice squad member only

Awards and highlights
- CIFL champion (2010); United Bowl champion (2009); First-team All-CIFL (2013); Second-team All-CIFL (2010); 2× First-team All-MAC (2001–2002)

Career AFL statistics
- Receptions: 470
- Receiving yards: 5,340
- Receiving touchdowns: 81
- Stats at ArenaFan.com

Robert Redd (born September 1, 1980) is an American former professional football wide receiver. He played college football for the Bowling Green Falcons, earning first-team All-MAC in 2001 and 2002.

== Early life ==
Redd attended Wayne High School in Huber Heights, Ohio, where he compiled 152 career catches for 2,007 yards and 27 touchdowns. He was named the co-offensive player of the year by the Dayton Daily News his junior season, when he led the state with 75 catches for 1,095 yards and 17 scores. He also played running back and cornerback, while returning punts and kickoffs.

== College career ==
Redd played collegiately at Bowling Green State University from 1998–2002, continuing a family tradition of playing for the Falcons set by his two uncles (Ronnie Redd and Raymond (Sarge) D. Redd Jr.). He appeared in nine games his freshman year, missing the final two after separating his shoulder against Akron. His sophomore year he led the Falcons with six touchdown receptions in nine games. The Falcons suspended Redd the final two games of the season for tardiness and missing practice. Redd then transferred to Louisville where he appeared with the team in the spring of 2000. With the arrival of new head coach Urban Meyer for the 2001 season, Redd ultimately decided to return to Bowling Green with two years of eligibility. As a junior, he set a school record for receiving yards in a game with 215 against Marshall. As a senior, he led the team and ranked 10th in the nation with 83 catches. He was a two-time All-MAC selection and registered 211 career receptions for 2,726 yards and 26 touchdowns.

== Statistics ==
Year	Team	Games		Receiving				Rushing				Punt returns				Kick returns			
Year	Team	GP	GS	Rec	Yds	Avg	TD	Att	Yds	Avg	TD	Att	Yds	Avg	TD	Att	Yds	Avg	TD
1998	Bowling Green	9	4	17	317	18.6	1	1	8	8.0	0	15	101	6.7	0	5	61	12.2	0
1999	Bowling Green	9	—	39	552	14.2	6	1	6	6.0	0	24	128	5.3	0	7	137	19.6	0
2000	Louisville	0	0	Transfer redshirt (redshirt)															
2001	Bowling Green	11	11	72	884	12.3	9	4	-2	-0.5	0	35	385	11.0	1	1	12	12.0	0
2002	Bowling Green	12	12	83	973	11.7	9	1	8	8.0	0	31	209	6.7	0	—	—	—	—
Career		41	—	211	2,726	12.9	25	7	20	2.9	0	105	823	7.8	1	13	210	16.2	0

== Professional career ==
=== Indianapolis Colts ===
On April 27, 2003, he was signed by the Indianapolis Colts as an undrafted free agent. He participated in preseason games and was released on August 27, 2003.

=== Colorado Crush (first stint) ===
On October 28, 2003, Redd signed with the Colorado Crush of the Arena Football League (AFL). On March 12, 2004, he was placed on the injured reserve list. He was activated two weeks later on March 26. In his first season with the Crush, Redd caught 44 passes for 474 yards and five touchdowns in 14 games. He also threw a touchdown pass. He also played defense where recorded eight tackles and forced two fumbles. He also recorded a touchdown on a kickoff return.

=== Philadelphia Eagles ===
On January 14, 2005 he was signed by the Philadelphia Eagles. He participated in preseason games, where he had two receptions for 38 yards. He was released on September 3, 2005 and signed to the practice squad two days later. He was released again on September 27, and signed to the practice squad again on October 19. On November 29, Redd was released.

=== Berlin Thunder ===
On February 14, 2005, Redd was selected by the Berlin Thunder, of NFL Europe in the allocation draft. He appeared in four games, recording 15 receptions for 149 yards and a touchdown. In the World Bowl, he had seven catches for 102 yards and a touchdown. In 2006, he appeared in all ten of the Thunder's games, starting two. He was also the primary punt and kick returner for the Thunder to go along with nine receptions for 106 yards.

=== Atlanta Falcons ===
On January 9, 2006 he was signed by the Atlanta Falcons. He participated in preseason games, where he recorded one catch for nine yards. He was released on September 2, 2006.

=== Colorado Crush (second stint) ===
He signed with the Crush in 2007, returning to arena football for the first time since the 2004 season. Redd had 62 receptions for 540 yards and five touchdowns.

=== Cleveland Gladiators (first stint) ===
On November 14, 2007 Redd signed with the Cleveland Gladiators. In his first season, he led the Gladiators in all-purpose yards. He had a career high 129 receptions for 1,528 yards and 16 touchdowns. On defense, he recovered three fumbles and returned an interception 50 yards for a touchdown.

=== Bloomington Extreme ===
In 2009, Redd signed with the Bloomington Extreme of the newly formed Indoor Football League (IFL). He appeared in five games and had 26 receptions for 231 yards and six touchdowns.

=== Billings Outlaws ===
On April 21, 2009 Redd was traded to the Billings Outlaws in exchange for three players. He appeared in nine regular season games where he recorded 45 receptions for 640 yards and 14 touchdowns. In three postseason games he had 16 receptions for 216 yards and seven touchdowns. In the United Bowl, Redd had five receptions for 81 yards and two touchdowns while the Outlaws defeated the RiverCity Rage 71–62.

=== Spokane Shock ===
In 2010, it was announced that Redd had signed with the Spokane Shock in the reformed AFL, but he was released 2 months later.

=== Cincinnati Commandos ===
After his release, Redd signed with the Cincinnati Commandos of the Continental Indoor Football League (CIFL). He went on to be 5th in the league in receiving, and the Commandos went 9–1 in the regular season. The Commandos went on to win the CIFL Championship Game.

=== Cleveland Gladiators (second stint) ===
On January 12, 2011, Redd signed with Cleveland Gladiators. In 2011, Red caught a career high 30 touchdowns to go along with 98 receptions and 1,279 yards. He was fourth on the team in receiving and the Gladiators achieved a playoff berth. In 2012, Redd had 115 receptions for 1,318 yards and 25 touchdowns.

=== Owensboro Rage ===
On October 12, 2012, Redd signed with the Owensboro Rage of the Continental Indoor Football League (CIFL). He didn't appear in any games with the Rage.

=== Dayton Sharks ===
Redd ultimately played with the Dayton Sharks of the Continental Indoor Football League (CIFL) for the 2013 season. In the Sharks first game of existence, Redd caught two touchdowns from quarterback Tommy Jones. For the Sharks, he earned 1st team All-CIFL honors.

=== Philadelphia Soul ===
On March 18, 2014, Redd signed with the Philadelphia Soul of the Arena Football League (AFL). For the Soul he appeared in eight games recording 22 receptions for 201 yards. On May 23, he returned a kickoff for a touchdown against the Cleveland Gladiators.

== Career statistics ==
=== NFLE ===
Regular season

Year	Team	Games		Receiving					Kick returns					Punt returns				
Year	Team	GP	GS	Rec	Yds	Avg	Lng	TD	Att	Yds	Avg	Lng	TD	Att	Yds	Avg	Lng	TD
2005	BER	4	0	15	149	9.9	23	1	—	—	—	—	—	3	17	5.7	8	0
2006	BER	10	2	9	106	11.8	23	0	19	477	25.1	62	0	15	147	9.8	38	0
Career		14	2	24	255	10.6	23	1	19	477	25.1	62	0	18	164	9.1	38	0

Postseason

Year	Team	Games		Receiving					Kick returns					Punt returns				
Year	Team	GP	GS	Rec	Yds	Avg	Lng	TD	Att	Yds	Avg	Lng	TD	Att	Yds	Avg	Lng	TD
2005	BER	1	1	7	102	14.6	29	1	—	—	—	—	—	3	3	1.0	7	0
Career		1	1	7	102	14.6	29	0	0	0	0.0	0	0	3	3	1.0	7	0

=== AFL ===
Regular season

Year	Team	Games		Receiving					Kick returns				
Year	Team	GP	GS	Rec	Yds	Avg	Lng	TD	Att	Yds	Avg	Lng	TD
2004	COL	14	—	44	474	10.8	—	5	6	115	19.2	—	1
2007	COL	13	—	62	540	8.7	—	5	11	114	10.4	—	0
2008	CLE	16	16	129	1,528	11.8	37	16	25	381	15.2	33	0
2011	CLE	18	18	98	1,279	13.1	49	30	45	786	17.5	54	0
2012	CLE	17	17	115	1,318	11.5	36	25	77	1,307	17.0	55	1
2014	PHI	8	4	22	201	9.1	22	0	43	810	18.8	56	1
Career		86	—	470	5,340	11.4	—	81	207	3,513	17.0	—	3

Postseason

Year	Team	Games		Receiving					Kick returns				
Year	Team	GP	GS	Rec	Yds	Avg	Lng	TD	Att	Yds	Avg	Lng	TD
2004	COL	2	—	10	98	9.8	—	0	2	33	16.5	—	0
2008	CLE	3	3	30	399	13.3	38	9	6	106	17.7	35	0
2011	CLE	1	—	8	97	12.1	—	3	4	64	16.0	—	0
Career		6	—	48	594	12.4	—	12	12	203	16.9	—	0

=== Indoor football (other) ===
Regular season

Year	Team	League	Games	Receiving					Kick returns				
Year	Team	League	GP	Rec	Yds	Avg	Lng	TD	Att	Yds	Avg	Lng	TD
2009	BLOM	IFL	5	26	231	8.8	30	6	4	62	15.5	22	0
2009	BILL	IFL	9	45	640	14.2	43	14	3	54	18.0	37	0
2010	CIN	CIFL	8	23	238	10.3	34	12	11	174	15.8	25	0

Postseason

Year	Team	League	Games	Receiving					Kick returns				
Year	Team	League	GP	Rec	Yds	Avg	Lng	TD	Att	Yds	Avg	Lng	TD
2009	BILL	IFL	3	16	216	13.5	—	7	unknown				
2010	CIN	CIFL	2	13	160	12.3	38	3	3	68	22.7	26	0
