= Dominick Goodman =

American football player (born 1987)

No. 16, 88
- Position: Wide receiver

Personal information
- Born: February 1, 1987 (age 39); Groesbeck, Ohio, U.S.
- Listed height: 6 ft 1 in (1.85 m)
- Listed weight: 210 lb (95 kg)

Career information
- High school: Colerain (Cincinnati, Ohio)
- College: Cincinnati
- NFL draft: 2009: undrafted

Career history
- Cincinnati Commandos (2010); Dresden Monarchs (2010); Cleveland Gladiators (2011–2016); Sioux Falls Storm (2017)

Awards and highlights
- AFL American Conference Champion (2014); CIFL Receiving Yardage Leader (2010); CIFL Receiving Touchdowns Leader (2010); CIFL Offensive Player of the Year (2010); CIFL Champion (2010); MCFL Champion (2009); Second Team All-Arena (2012); First Team All-Arena (2014)

Career AFL statistics
- Receptions: 727
- Receiving yards: 7,280
- Receiving touchdowns: 132
- Rushing yards: 52
- Rushing touchdowns: 6
- Stats at ArenaFan.com

Dominick Wendell Goodman (born February 1, 1987) is an American former professional football wide receiver. He played in the German Football League (GFL) and Arena Football League (AFL).

== Early life ==
Born the son of Don and Angela Goodman, Dominick attended Colerain High School in Cincinnati, Ohio, where he excelled at both football and basketball. As a quarterback, he led the Cardinals to a 15-0 record and the Ohio state championship with a #5 ranking in the USA Today polls. He was named MVP of the Ohio championship game, running for a record 259 yards (21 carries) and scored a record-tying four touchdowns. For that performance he was named USA Today's High School Football Player of the Week. He was also named as a football All-American by PrepNation.com and 1st team All-City. He was selected to play in the Cincinnati East-West and the Big 33 Ohio-Pennsylvania All-Star games. He will play football next season for the University of Cincinnati. Also a stellar basketball player, Dominick became the first player in school history to score over 1,000 career points, finishing with 1,175 points, and this season was named 1st team All-Conference, 1st team All-City, and honorable mention All-Southwest Ohio.

== College career ==
Goodman, chose football over basketball, when making his college selection, when he signed with the University of Cincinnati. He was ranked as a 2-Star prospect according to Rivals.com. At Cincinnati, Dominick went on to have several successful seasons, as he was ranked 4th on the career receiving list, 10th in receiving yards, 3rd in touchdowns in Cincinnati history, going into his senior season.

== Professional career ==
=== Kings Comets ===
After failing to be drafted in 2009, Goodman played for the Kings Comets of the Mid Continental Football League, where he, and several other University of Cincinnati players, helped the Comets win the championship.

=== Cincinnati Commandos ===
After the 2009 outdoor season was over, Goodman signed to play indoor football with the Cincinnati Commandos, of the Continental Indoor Football League. Goodman posted outstanding numbers in his rookie season which saw him lead the league in catches (47), yards (473), and touchdowns (18). Goodman also started one game at quarterback, against the Wisconsin Wolfpack, which he completed 7 of 12 passes for 26 yards and no touchdowns. Dominick also had 25 rush attempts for 93 yards and 4 touchdowns. His offensive versatility proved him to be a force. As a result of his great season, he was named the 2010 CIFL Offensive Player of the Year.

=== Dresden Monarchs ===
Prior to the start of the 2010 CIFL playoffs, Goodman left to play for the Dresden Monarchs of the German Football League. Joining a team that was 1-4 before his arrival, Goodman helped the Monarchs finish 7-7 and make the GFL's semifinals for only the second time in the team's history. Playing only ten of the Monarch's 14 games, Goodman finished second on the team in catches (50) and yards (720) and was also second on the team with three interceptions.

=== Northern Kentucky River Monsters ===
In early 2011, it was announced that Goodman has signed with the Northern Kentucky River Monsters. He did in fact sign with the River Monsters, but was also drawing interest from the Arena Football League. So when the Cleveland Gladiators put an offer on the table, Goodman signed, and never played for the River Monsters.

=== Cleveland Gladiators ===
On February 18, 2011, Goodman officially signed with the Gladiators. Once joining the Gladiators, Goodman missed a few weeks with injuries. He was able to return, and it now leading the team in receptions, despite his missed time. On March 3, 2016, the Gladiators were assigned Goodman.

During a Goodman’s six seasons in Cleveland, he helped the Gladiators win the 2011 & 2014 East Division Championships, and the 2014 American Conference Championship, as he helped then earn a trip to Arena Bowl XXVII.

=== Sioux Falls Storm ===
On March 22, 2017, Goodman signed with the Sioux Falls Storm. On June 15, 2017, Goodman was released.
