= Corey Jenkins =

American football player (born 1976)

No. 53, 57
- Positions: Linebacker, quarterback

Personal information
- Born: August 25, 1976 (age 50); Columbia, South Carolina, U.S.
- Listed height: 6 ft 1 in (1.85 m)
- Listed weight: 220 lb (100 kg)

Career information
- High school: Dreher (SC)
- College: South Carolina
- NFL draft: 2003: 6th round, 181st overall pick

Career history
- Miami Dolphins (2003–2004); Chicago Bears (2004); Miami Dolphins (2004); Green Bay Packers (2005)*; Carolina Panthers (2006)*; Winnipeg Blue Bombers (2007)
- * Offseason or practice squad member only

Career NFL statistics
- Tackles: 9
- Stats at Pro Football Reference

Career CFL statistics
- Tackles: 30
- Interceptions: 1
- Forced fumbles: 3

Corey Jenkins (born August 25, 1976) is an American former professional football player. He played quarterback at the University of South Carolina and was selected by the Miami Dolphins. He saw limited playing time in the National Football League (NFL) and Canadian Football League (CFL).

== Career ==
Jenkins was a standout athlete at Columbia, South Carolina's Dreher High School, where he was a three sport star.

=== Baseball ===
Jenkins was drafted in the first round (24th overall selection) of the 1995 MLB draft by the Boston Red Sox. He played four seasons in Boston's minor league system before he was traded to the Chicago White Sox. He made it to the Double-A level before getting released in 1999.

=== Football ===
Jenkins next played football at Garden City Community College where he was a two-time All-American. He was then recruited to play football under Lou Holtz at the University of South Carolina. After two seasons with the Gamecocks, Jenkins was selected by the Miami Dolphins in the sixth round of the 2003 NFL draft. He played two seasons with Miami and one with the Chicago Bears.

== Coaching career ==
Jenkins is currently the head coach of the Dreher High School (Columbia, South Carolina)|] football team in Columbia, South Carolina.

== Personal life ==
Corey Jenkins is married to Monica Jenkins, with 3 children Jasiah, Natalia and Kenzo Jenkins. Jenkins had an article written about him in the May 2011 issue of ESPN The Magazine about a Ponzi Scheme that he was a victim of back in the 1990s at the start of his baseball career.
