= Ben Mauk =

American gridiron football player (born 1985)

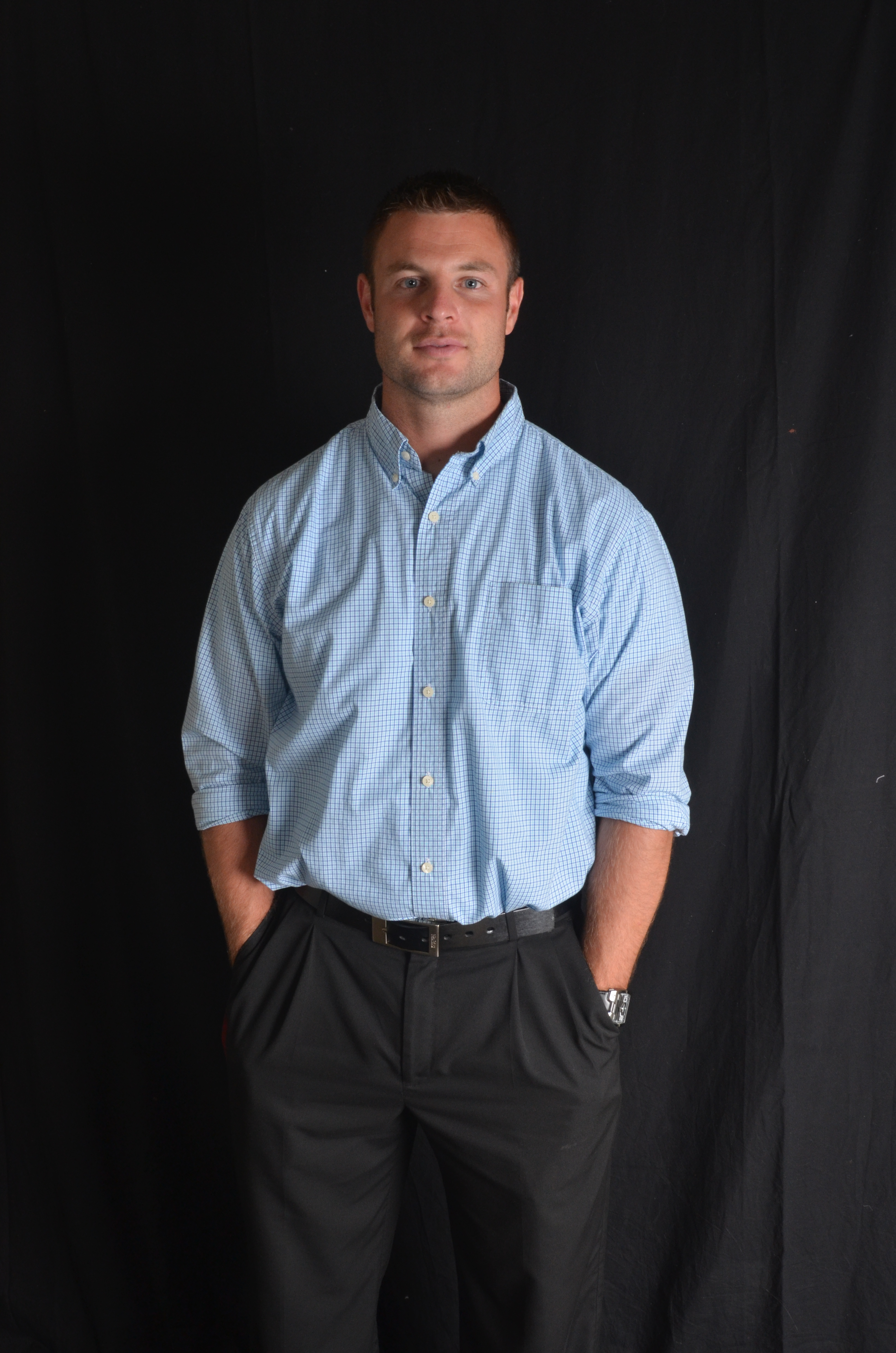
- Mauk wearing casual attire

No. 7
- Position: Quarterback

Personal information
- Born: January 4, 1985 (age 41); Kenton, Ohio, U.S.
- Listed height: 6 ft 1 in (1.85 m)
- Listed weight: 200 lb (91 kg)

Career information
- High school: Kenton (OH)
- College: Wake Forest (2003–2006); Cincinnati (2007)
- NFL draft: 2008: undrafted

Career history
- Saskatchewan Roughriders (2008)*; Cincinnati Commandos (2010–2011); Tampa Bay Storm (2011)*
- * Offseason or practice squad member only

Awards and highlights
- CIFL champion (2010); First-team All-CIFL (2010); CIFL MVP (2010); CIFL Championship Game MVP (2010); 2× First-team All-GFC (2002–2003); 2× GFC Defensive POTY (2002–2003)

Gary Benjamin Mauk (born January 4, 1985) is an American former football quarterback. He attended Kenton High School in Kenton, Ohio, where he set national passing records as a senior. Mauk then went on to play college football for the Wake Forest Demon Deacons and the Cincinnati Bearcats before starting his professional career.

He is the older brother of Maty Mauk, former quarterback for the Missouri Tigers.

== Early life ==
Mauk led the Kenton Wildcats to consecutive Ohio Division IV championships in 2001 and 2002. At the completion of his senior season, Ben gained national recognition by winning the 2002 Ohio Mr. Football Award, 2002 Gatorade Ohio Football Player of the Year and the 2002 Art Tuion Award Winner after throwing for the national record 6,540 yards that season alone.

During his high school career, Mauk became one of the most celebrated quarterbacks in Ohio High School Athletics Association history.

College recruiting
| Name | Hometown | School | Height | Weight | 40^{‡} | Commit date |
|---|---|---|---|---|---|---|
| Ben Mauk; QB | Kenton, Ohio | Kenton High School | 6 ft 2 in (1.88 m) | 180 lb (82 kg) | 4.6 | Jul 8, 2003 |
| Ben Mauk; QB | Recruit ratings: Scout: Rivals: | | | | | |
Overall recruit ranking: Scout: 36 (QB) Rivals: 48 (QB), 36 (OH)
‡ Refers to 40-yard dash; Note: In many cases, Scout, Rivals, 247Sports, On3, and ESPN may conflict in their listings of height, weight and 40 time.; In these cases, the average was taken. ESPN grades are on a 100-point scale.; Sources: "2004 Team Ranking". Rivals.com.

Mauk committed to Wake Forest University on July 8, 2003. Mauk wasn't heavily recruited, as he only had two other FBS scholarship offers: Kent State and Bowling Green.

== College career ==
=== Wake Forest ===
He was redshirted his first season, in 2003. In 2004, Ben played in ten games and started three. Against Clemson University, on his first collegiate snap, he set the record for the longest touchdown pass in Wake history, at 85 yards. He led the Deacons to a 4–7 overall record and was named to The Sporting News's ACC All-Freshman Team. In 2005, he played in ten games and started seven; the Deacons had another 4–7 season.

In 2006, Mauk sustained an injury to his right (throwing) arm in the first game against Syracuse. Mauk attempted to recover a fumble in the third quarter when two Orange players fell on the arm. He suffered a fractured humerus, a dislocated shoulder, and a torn labrum. Shortly after the injury, he underwent reconstructive surgery in which surgeons put a titanium plate with eight screws in his upper arm and installed three anchors in the shoulder. The Deacons, with redshirt freshman Riley Skinner taking over for Mauk, would go on to finish 11–3, winning their first ACC Championship Game, and on to the school's first BCS game in the Orange Bowl, in which the Deacons would lose to the Louisville Cardinals.

=== Cincinnati ===
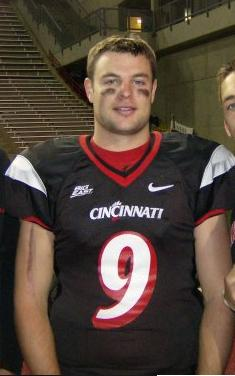
Mauk at a football game

Because of Mauk's reconstructive surgery, it was doubtful that Wake Forest would let Mauk compete for playing time at Wake in 2007. He decided to take advantage of an NCAA rule, later rescinded, that allowed graduate students with remaining athletic eligibility to transfer and become immediately eligible. Mauk chose the University of Cincinnati primarily because it was close to his hometown and new coach Brian Kelly was installing a spread offense similar to the one he ran in high school. The major question was whether his arm would improve enough to allow him to play. For his part, Kelly was not sure whether Mauk could come back; he had the Bearcats' medical team contact the physicians who performed Mauk's surgery, and required that he pass a physical examination with emphasis on the throwing arm. Ultimately, Kelly decided to bring Mauk in, figuring that, if nothing else, Mauk could serve as a mentor for the Bearcats' younger quarterbacks who would have to adjust to the spread offense.

Mauk, named the starting quarterback over junior Dustin Grutza, was trying to lead the Bearcats to their first winning season in the Big East. The Bearcats jumped out ahead early, winning all five non-conference games. They then entered Big East play, with Mauk leading them to victories over Syracuse, UConn, USF, and Rutgers. Mauk and the Bearcats finished with a 10–3 overall record, capping their season and Mauk's college career with a 31–21 win over Southern Miss in the 2007 PapaJohn's.com Bowl in which Mauk threw for 334 yards and four touchdowns, becoming the game's MVP. This gave the Bearcats their first 10-win season since 1951, and virtually assured them a spot in the end-of-season national rankings for the first time ever.

Mauk, called the "Bionic Man" by his Cincinnati teammates due to the various metallic objects installed in his arm, proved to be an inspiration to them. Bearcats safety Haruki Nakamura said about Mauk, "The first time I saw the scar, I was like: 'What is that? Did you get a shark bite?' For someone to endure that sort of pain is unbelievable. To do what he's done this year is great. He's definitely become an impact player on this team."

Mauk tried to gain one more year of eligibility for the 2008 season. However, he was turned down by the NCAA. Mauk appealed his case a final time via teleconference; on September 3, 2008, he learned that it had been denied.

On September 9, 2008, Hardin County Judge William Hart refused to grant a permanent injunction against the NCAA that would have allowed Mauk to rejoin the Bearcats.

== Professional career ==
=== Saskatchewan Roughriders ===
In September 2008, Mauk signed with the Saskatchewan Roughriders of the Canadian Football League. He was released in October following an injury.

=== Cincinnati Commandos ===
Mauk was the quarterback for Cincinnati's indoor football team, the Cincinnati Commandos. In his first season with the team (2010), he started nine regular-season games and threw for 52 touchdowns and 1,631 yards, both league highs, capturing the CIFL MVP and CIFL Championship Game MVP awards as the Commandos went 11–1 and won the league championship. In his second season, he played in just two games, completing 10 of 17 passes for four touchdowns and two interceptions. During his second game, he was ejected for an illegal hit after throwing an interception. As a result, Mauk was suspended by the league for two games.

=== Tampa Bay Storm ===
Mauk was invited to try out with the Tampa Bay Storm in 2011. He left the team for medical reasons and was released on February 23.

== Coaching ==
Following his playing career, Mauk began coaching at the high school level. He spent several years as an assistant coach and offensive coordinator at Glendale High School in Springfield, Missouri, where he worked under his father, Mike Mauk, and alongside his brother, Maty. In 2023, he joined the staff at Monett High School and was promoted to head coach in January 2024.

=== High school ===
| Year | Class | Team | Won | Lost | Ties | Win % | Conference | District | State |
|---|---|---|---|---|---|---|---|---|---|
| 2024 | 4 | Monett HS (MO) | 3 | 7 | 0 | .300 | 7th in Big 8 | 6th | NA |
| 2025 | 4 | Monett HS (MO) | 5 | 6 | 0 | .454 | 7th in Big 8 | 4th | NA |
| 2026 | 4 | Monett HS (MO) | 5 | 6 | 0 | .454 | T-5 in Big 8 | 4th | NA |
