= Saul Patu =

American football player and coach (born 1978)

No. 48
- Position: Defensive end

Personal information
- Born: June 8, 1978 (age 48); Seattle, Washington, U.S.
- Listed height: 6 ft 3 in (1.91 m)
- Listed weight: 260 lb (118 kg)

Career information
- High school: Rainier Beach (Seattle)
- College: Oregon
- NFL draft: 2001: undrafted

Career history

Playing
- New York Jets (2001)*; New England Patriots (2001)*; Tennessee Titans (2001–2002)*; Colorado Crush (2003–2007); Columbus Destroyers (2008)
- * Offseason or practice squad member only

Coaching
- Sheldon HS (2017) Defensive line; Rainier Beach HS (2018) Defensive line; Lewis & Clark (2019) Defensive line/run game; Capital Christian HS (2020–present)

Awards and highlights
- ArenaBowl champion (2005); Second-team All-Pac-10 (2000)

Career AFL statistics
- Total tackles: 125
- Sacks: 14.5
- Forced fumbles: 9
- Rushing yards: 196
- Rushing touchdowns: 9
- Stats at ArenaFan.com

Saul King Patu (born June 8, 1978) is an American football coach and former defensive end. He played college football at Oregon and professionally in the Arena Football League (AFL).

== Early life and college ==
Patu was born and raised in Seattle to a family of Samoan, Tongan, Fijian, German, and French background. He graduated from Rainier Beach High School in Seattle in 1996.

From 1997 to 2000 at the University of Oregon, Patu was a four-year starting defensive end for Oregon Ducks football. As a senior in 2000, Patu set a school record for single season tackles for loss with 21 and ranked third in the Pac-10 in sacks with eleven. Patu earned honorable mention All-Pac-10 honors for his first three seasons and second-team All-Pac-10 honors in his senior year. He graduated from Oregon in 2000 with a bachelor's degree in family and human services.

== Professional football ==
Saul Patu signed a free agent contract in the National Football League for the New York Jets (2001) and spent time with the New England Patriots (2001) and Tennessee Titans (2001–2002) before signing a contract in the Arena Football League for the Colorado Crush (2003–2008). Patu is the Crush's all-time sack leader and holds the record for yards per carry as a fullback. He was part of the 2005 Crush team that won ArenaBowl XIX.

Patu played last for the Columbus Destroyers in 2008 before retiring from football. In his six seasons with the AFL, Patu had 125 total tackles, 14.5 sacks, nine passes defended, nine forced fumbles, 196 rushing yards, nine rushing touchdowns, and one touchdown reception.

== Post-football career ==
=== Coaching career ===
Patu began a football coaching career in 2017 as defensive line coach at Sheldon High School in Eugene, Oregon. Patu was defensive line coach at Rainier Beach High School in 2018 and defensive line coach and run game coordinator for Lewis & Clark College in 2019. Then in 2020, Patu joined Capital Christian High School in Sacramento, California as head football coach and advancement director.

== Personal life ==
After retiring from football, Patu also worked as a youth pastor, team chaplain for Oregon Ducks men's basketball, and as a manager at Symantec and Veritas Technologies.

He has four children.
