= 2010 Continental Indoor Football League season =

2010 CIFL season
- League: Continental Indoor Football League
- Sport: Indoor Football

Regular season
- Season champions: Cincinnati Commandos
- Season MVP: Ben Mauk, CIN

League postseason
- 1 vs 4 CIFL Semifinals champions: Cincinnati Commandos
- 1 vs 4 CIFL Semifinals runners-up: Miami Valley Silverbacks
- 2 vs 3 CIFL Semifinals champions: Wisconsin Wolfpack
- 2 vs 3 CIFL Semifinals runners-up: Fort Wayne Firehawks

CIFL Championship Game
- Champions: Cincinnati Commandos
- Runners-up: Wisconsin Wolfpack
- Finals MVP: Ben Mauk (CIN)

CIFL seasons
- ← 2009 2011 →

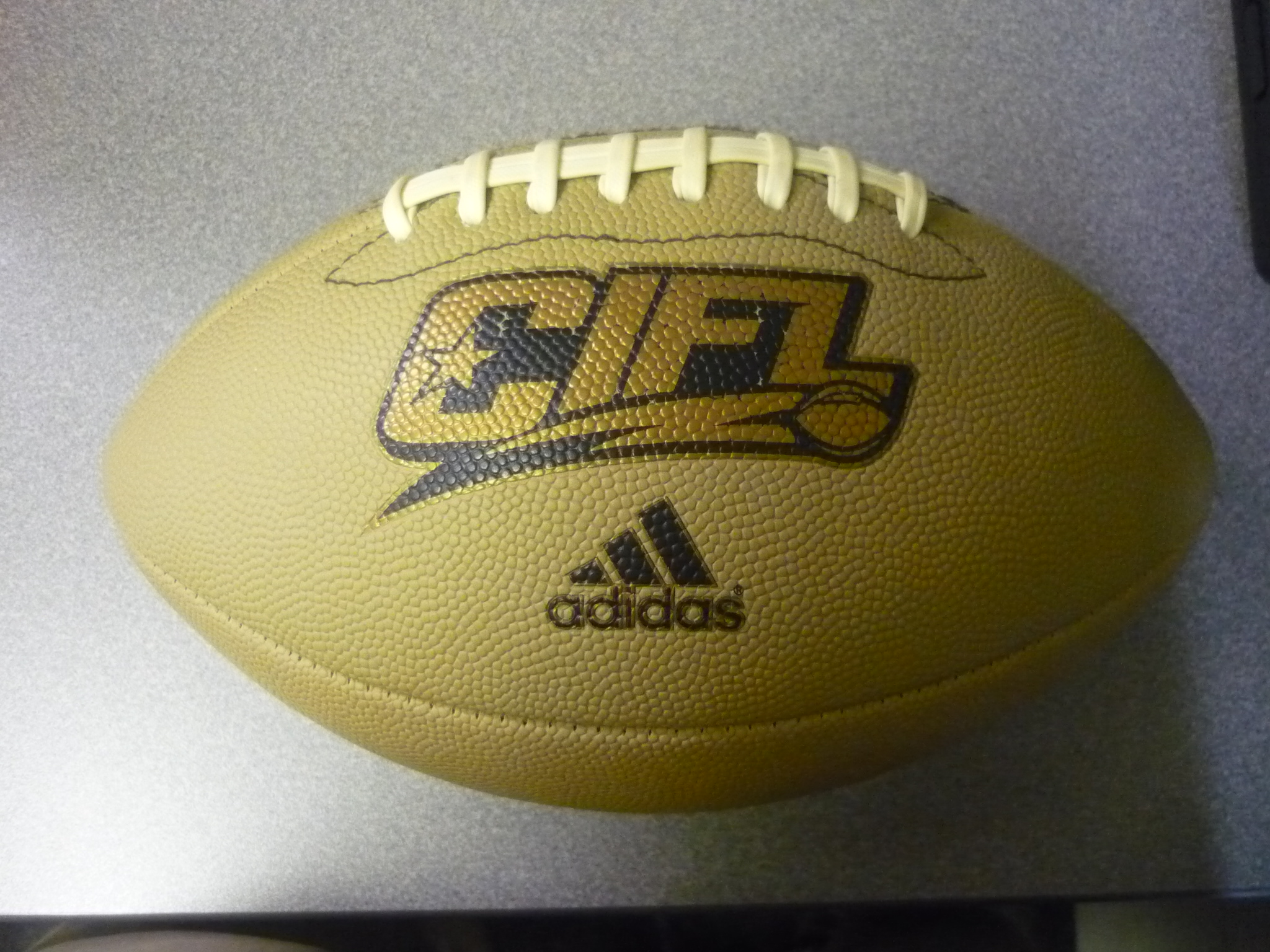
The CIFL's 2010 game ball

The 2010 Continental Indoor Football League season was the league's fifth overall season. The regular season started on Saturday March 13 with the expansion Cincinnati Commandos defeating the Miami Valley Silverbacks 38-32, and ended with the 2010 CIFL Championship Game, on June 26, 2010, at the Cincinnati Gardens in Cincinnati, Ohio where the Commandos defeated the Wisconsin Wolfpack 54-40.

In 2010, the league saw its size shrink again. This time it was from 8 teams to 6 teams, as Fort Wayne Freedom, Rock River Raptors and the Wheeling Wildcats folded following the 2009 season, and the Chicago Slaughter departed the league to join the Indoor Football League. The CIFL awarded the Cincinnati Commandos and Fort Wayne FireHawks expansion franchises, and the Milwaukee Bonecrushers moved to Chicago and became the Cardinals.

On May 26, 2010, it was announced that the Marion Mayhem ceased operations immediately. This made the league finish with only 5 teams, with the top 4 still making the playoffs.

== Schedule ==
Since the league was back to 6 teams for the first time since 2006, they did away with divisions and went back to a ten-game schedule for each team. Every team was scheduled to play a home and away game with every team except Miami Valley, as they were competing as a travel team.

=== Scheduling changes ===
On May 26, 2010, it was announced that the Marion Mayhem ceased operations immediately. As a result of the Mayhem folding Fort Wayne, Wisconsin and Miami Valley were awarded wins for their remaining games against Marion. Fort Wayne was awarded two wins, while Wisconsin and Miami Valley each receive one win. This was the first time that a CIFL team had failed to finish a season in which it hard started.

== Regular season standings ==
2010 Continental Indoor Football League
Team	W	L	T	PCT	PF	PA	PF (Avg.)	PA (Avg.)	STK
Cincinnati Commandos-y	9	1	0	.900	493	294	49.3	29.4	L1
Wisconsin Wolfpack-x	8	2	0	.800	345	213	34.5	21.3	W3
Fort Wayne FireHawks-x	6	4	0	.600	294	267	36.75	33.375	W2
Miami Valley Silverbacks-x	4	6	0	.400	309	354	34.33	39.33	W1
Marion Mayhem	3	7	0	.300	202	193	33.67	32.16	L5
Chicago Cardinals	0	10	0	.000	205	525	20.5	52.5	L10

== Playoffs ==
Semifinals
3	Fort Wayne	24
2	Wisconsin	25
4	Miami Valley	24
1	Cincinnati	48

CIFL Championship Game
2	Wisconsin	40
1	Cincinnati	54

== Rule changes ==
The league adapted an 8th man on both sides of the ball after playing 7-on-7 since the league's birth in 2006.

== Media ==
The league launched the Gameday Center on its website that would allow followers to enjoy live stats for each game. Teams were also allowed to use local media to broadcast the teams under their own terms.

== Uniforms ==
The FireHawks only had home uniforms so teams that hosted the FireHawks wore their road uniforms against them.

== Coaching changes ==
=== Pre-season ===
Team	2011 Coach	2010 Coach(es)	Reason for leaving	Story/Accomplishments
Miami Valley Silverbacks	Brian Wells	Derrick Shepard	Demotion	The team named former Cincinnati Swarm (af2), Louisville Fire (af2) and Cincinnati Marshals (NIFL) assistant Brian Wells as head coach. The 2010 Silverbacks finished the regular season with, at the time, the best winning percentage in team history (.400) and their second ever playoff berth. Shepard, who was the Dayton Silverbacks' Head Coach in 2009 before he was replaced prior to the 2010 regular season, after posting a 0-10 record. In 2010, he served as the Line Coach for the Silverbacks under Wells.

== Records and milestones ==
- Most sacks in a game: 4, Brodrick Johnson, Fort Wayne (vs. Chicago, June 5, 2010)
- Most sacks in a game: 5, Thomas McKenzie, Fort Wayne (vs. Chicago, June 5, 2010)
- Most shutouts in a single season: 2, Wisconsin (vs. Fort Wayne, April 16, 2010) & Fort Wayne (vs. Chicago, June 5, 2010)

== Awards ==
=== Regular season awards ===
Award	Winner	Position	Team
CIFL MVP	Ben Mauk	Quarterback	Cincinnati Commandos
Offensive Player of the Year	Dominick Goodman	Wide receiver	Cincinnati Commandos
Co-Defensive Players of the Year	James Spikes/Tramaine Billie	Defensive lineman/linebacker	Cincinnati Commandos/Fort Wayne FireHawks
Special teams Player of the Year	Mike Tatum	Wide receiver	Marion Mayhem/Fort Wayne FireHawks
All-Purpose Player of the Year	Brandon Wogoman	Wide receiver	Chicago Cardinals/Wisconsin Wolfpack
Co-Coaches of the Year	Billy Back/Brian Wells	Head coaches	Cincinnati Commandos/Miami Valley Silverbacks

=== 1st Team All-CIFL ===
Offense
Quarterback	Ben Mauk, Cincinnati
Running back	Greg Moore, Cincinnati
Wide receiver	Dominick Goodman, Cincinnati; Marques Johnson, Wisconsin; Justin Wynn, Fort Wayne
Offensive tackle	Matt Rahn, Chicago/Wisconsin; Khalil El-Amin, Cincinnati
Center	Richard Bailey, Cincinnati

Defense
Defensive end	James Spikes, Cincinnati; Kurt Ware, Wisconsin
Defensive tackle	Terrill Byrd, Cincinnati
Linebacker	Tramaine Billie, Fort Wayne
Defensive back	E.J. Underwood, Cincinnati; Jeff Franklin, Cincinnati; Josh Nettles, Wisconsin; Chris Stanford, Miami Valley

Special teams
Kicker	Tony Smidl, Wisconsin
All-Purpose Player	Brandon Wogoman, Chicago/Wisconsin
Kick returner	Mike Tatum, Marion

=== 2nd Team All-CIFL ===
Offense
Quarterback	Matt Schabert, Wisconsin
Running back	Eric Donoval, Wisconsin
Wide receiver	Brandon Boehm, Cincinnati; Marcus Lewis, Wisconsin; Daniel Stover, Miami Valley
Offensive tackle	Brandon Price, Marion; Frank Straub, Cincinnati
Center	Anthony Harris, Fort Wayne

Defense
Defensive end	Thomas McKenzie, Marion/Fort Wayne; Adrian Henry, Chicago, Brodrick Johnson, Fort Wayne
Defensive tackle	Derrick Crawford, Miami Valley
Linebacker	Clayton Mullins, Cincinnati
Defensive back	Paul Carter, Fort Wayne; Ricky Emery, Chicago; Quincy Hudson, Wisconsin; Robbie Wilson, Cincinnati

Special teams
Kicker	Travis Johnson, Cincinnati
All-Purpose Player	Robert Redd, Cincinnati
Kick returner	Brandon Wogoman, Chicago/Wisconsin

== Statistics ==
=== Passing ===
Player	Comp.	Att.	Comp%	Yards	TD's	INT's	Long
Ben Mauk (CIN)	170	260	65.4	1826	56	14	45
Matt Schabert (WIS)	137	227	60.4	1299	32	10	39
Ron Ricciardi (CHI)	89	209	42.6	842	14	20	28
Josh Davis (MAR)	71	155	48.3	707	10	8	35
Kota-Carone Colors (FW)	71	155	45.8	694	14	9	45

=== Rushing ===
Player	Car.	Yards	Avg.	TD's	Long
Greg Moore (CIN)	95	348	3.7	8	20
Josh Davis (MAR)	42	249	5.7	3	24
Kyenes Mincy (MV)	41	244	6.0	4	24
Kota-Carone Colors (FW)	42	226	5.4	4	28
Derrick Moss (MV)	63	214	3.4	4	26

=== Receiving ===
Player	Rec.	Yards	Avg.	TD's	Long
Dominick Goodman (CIN)	47	473	10.1	18	45
Marques Johnson (WIS)	32	461	14.1	11	35
Marcus Lewis (WIS)	53	446	8.4	15	31
Brandon Boehm (CIN)	43	438	10.4	12	40
Robert Redd (CIN)	36	398	11.1	15	38

=== Defensive ===
Player	Tackles	Solo	Assisted	Sack	INT	TD's
Tramaine Billie (FW)	78	55	23	1.0	4	3
Brodrick Johnson (FW)	35	20	15	12.5	1	0
Kurt Ware (WIS)	54	43	11	16.5	0	1
