= Cincinnati Commandos =

Indoor football team based in Ohio, US

Logo

General information
- Founded: 2009
- Folded: 2013
- Headquartered: Cincinnati, Ohio at the Cincinnati Gardens
- Colors: Army green, kelly green, red, light gray

Personnel
- Owners: Dennis Whitman; Paul Napier
- General manager: Jason Buckley
- Head coach: Billy Back

Team history
- Cincinnati Commandos (2010–2012)

Home fields
- Cincinnati Gardens (2010–2012)

League / conference affiliations
- Continental Indoor Football League (2010–2011) United Indoor Football League (2012): North Division (2012)

Championships
- League championships: 3: CIFL: 2010, 2011 UIFL: 2012
- Division championships: 1: UIFL North: 2012

Playoff appearances (3)
- CIFL: 2010, 2011 UIFL: 2012

The Cincinnati Commandos were a professional indoor football team based in Cincinnati, Ohio. The team suspended operations for the 2013 season, with hope of returning in 2014. They began play in 2010 as an expansion team in the Continental Indoor Football League before moving to the United Indoor Football League in 2012. The Commandos then left the UIFL after winning Ultimate Bowl II and re-joined the CIFL, but never took the field after its announcement. The Commandos were the fifth arena or indoor football in Cincinnati, after the Cincinnati Rockers (Arena Football League 1992–93), Cincinnati Swarm (af2 2003), Cincinnati Marshals (National Indoor Football League 2004–2006), and Cincinnati Jungle Kats (af2 2007). The owners of the Commandos are Dennis Whitman and Paul Napier. The Commandos played their home games at Cincinnati Gardens.

== Franchise history ==
=== Play begins: 2010 ===
The Commandos posted a 9–1 regular season mark in the 2010 season, winning their first nine games before losing the final one at Wisconsin. After a three-week break, Cincinnati defeated Miami Valley, 48–24, in the CIFL Semifinals, and then defeated the Wisconsin Wolfpack, 54–40 in the 2010 CIFL Championship Game, on June 26, to claim Cincinnati's first ever professional football championship.

=== 2011 ===
Head Coach Billy Back returned for the 2011 season, Brian Wells, former head coach of the Miami Valley Silverbacks, was hired as assistant head coach / special teams coordinator / offensive line coach. For 2011 the Commandos have announced the signing of: Tyler Sheehan (QB), Derrick Crawford (defensive line), Maurice Lee (WR), Corey Clarke (WR), Brandon Harrison (WR), and Peter Warrick (WR) Cincinnati opened up defense of its 2010 CIFL Championship with a convincing 53–7 victory over Chicago on March 5. Cincinnati unveiled its championship banner at The Gardens that same night and gave its fans a memorable evening. Cincinnati dominated the game from start to finish jumping out to 21–0 lead and 27–7 halftime lead. Cincinnati scored just once in the third quarter before adding three more scores in the final stanza. Cincinnati was led by two quarterbacks. Starting quarterback Tyler Sheehan was 11 of 20 for 135 yards and two touchdowns. Fellow quarterback and 2010 CIFL MVP Ben Mauk was nine of 15 for 102 yards and four touchdowns. The passing was spread around to seven receivers. The top receiver was Keynes Mincy with six receptions for 64 yards and two touchdowns. Other receivers include Brandon Boehm wo had three catches for 50 yards; George Murray had four receptions for 44 yards; and Greg Moore had two catches for 35 yards. The leading rusher was Greg Moore with 24 yards on nine carries. On March 19, quarterback Tyler Sheehan broke a Commandos record, by throwing 8 touchdown passes against the Indianapolis Enforcers. The previous record had been 7, which Mauk achieved twice in the 2010 season. On May 29, 2011, the Commandos completed their first ever undefeated regular season, with a 50–20 win over the Marion Blue Racers, in what was a battle for first place and home field advantage throughout the CIFL Playoffs. Once again, the season ended with the Commandos as CIFL Champions, defeating the Blue Racers 44–29.

=== 2012 ===
After an initial report that stated the Commandos would join the Stadius Football Association, on July 11, 2011, the Commandos announced they were leaving the CIFL to join the Ultimate Indoor Football League. On August 23, 2011, it was announced that Bill Back would return as head coach for a 3rd season with the Commandos On July 2, 2012, the Commandos completed their third straight league championship, defeating the Florida Tarpons 62–44 in the UIFL's Ultimate Bowl II. Corry Stewart led the strong defensive unit with a record 15 interceptions on the season. The Commandos had won the CIFL Championship the previous two seasons.

=== 2013 ===
The Commandos left the UIFL after winning its third championship in a row. On August 3, 2012, they re-joined the CIFL. In September 2012, head coach Billy Back told the Commandos that he was not returning to pursue a higher level coaching position in professional football. The team named receivers coach, and former Arena Football League receiver, J.C. Baker as Back's replacement. In November 2012, the Commandos announced that they would suspend operations for the 2013 season, and re-organize for their future success. However, seeing as though ownership thought they could not win with anyone other than Back, the team never returned and disappeared.

== Statistics ==
=== Season-by-season results ===
League champions	Conference champions	Division champions	Wild card berth	League leader

Season	Team	League	Conference	Division	Regular season				Postseason results
Season	Team	League	Conference	Division	Finish	Wins	Losses	Ties	Postseason results
2010	2010	CIFL			1st	9	1		Won CIFL semifinals (Silverbacks) 48–24; Won 2010 CIFL Championship Game (Wolfpack) 54–40
2011	2011	CIFL			1st	10	0		Won CIFL semifinals (Knights) 71–13; Won 2011 CIFL Championship Game (Blue Racers) 44–29
2012	2012	UIFL	Northern		1st	10	2		Won UIFL semifinals (Explosion) 62–40; Won Ultimate Bowl II (Tarpons) 61–44
Totals						29	3		All-time regular season record (2010–2012)
Totals						6	0	-	All-time postseason record (2011–2012)
Totals						35	3		All-time regular season and postseason record (2010–2012)

=== Head coaches' records ===
Name	Term	Regular season				Playoffs		Awards
Name	Term	W	L	T	Win%	W	L	Awards
Billy Back	2010–2012	29	3	0	.906	6	0	Co-CIFL Coach of the Year (2010)
J.C. Baker	2013	Did not play						

== Players ==
=== Awards and honors ===
The following is a list of all Commandos players who have won league awards:

Season	Player	Position	Award
2010	Dominick Goodman	WR	Offensive Player of the Year
2010	James Spikes	DL	Co-defensive Player of the Year
2010	Ben Mauk	QB	CIFL MVP
2010	Ben Mauk	QB	CIFL Championship Game MVP
2011	Tyler Sheehan	QB	Offensive Player of the Year
2011	Tyler Sheehan	QB	CIFL MVP
2011	Tyler Sheehan	QB	CIFL Championship Game MVP
2012	James Spikes	DL	UIFL North Defensive Player of the Year
2012	Derrick Moss	RB	1st Team All-UIFL North
2012	Phillip Barnett	WR	1st Team All-UIFL North
2012	Kyenes Mincy	WR	1st Team All-UIFL North
2012	Frank Straub	OL	1st Team All-UIFL North
2012	James Frazier	DL	1st Team All-UIFL North
2012	James Spikes	DL	1st Team All-UIFL North
2012	E. J. Underwood	DB	1st Team All-UIFL North
2012	Mack Ogletree	All-purpose	1st Team All-UIFL North
2012	Tyler Sheehan	QB	Honorable Mention All-UIFL North
2012	Brandon Boehm	WR	Honorable Mention All-UIFL North
2012	Richard Bailey	OL	Honorable Mention All-UIFL North
2012	Richard Deutch	OL	Honorable Mention All-UIFL North
2012	Terrill Byrd	DL	Honorable Mention All-UIFL North
2012	Santino Turnbow	LB	Honorable Mention All-UIFL North
2012	Jeff Demary	DB	Honorable Mention All-UIFL North
2012	Corry Stewart	DB	Honorable Mention All-UIFL North

=== Other notable former players ===
- Rayshawn Askew – RB
- Maurice Lee – WR
- Robert Redd – WR/DB
- Khalil El-Amin – OL
- Chris Respress – DB
- E.J. Underwood – DB
