= Wisconsin Wolfpack =

Logo

General information
- Founded: 2009
- Folded: 2010
- Headquartered: Hartmeyer Arena in Madison, Wisconsin
- Colors: Midnight Blue, Vegas Gold, Cardinal red, white
- Mascot: Alpha

Personnel
- Head coach: Jordan Kopac

Team history
- Wisconsin Wolfpack (2009–2010)

Home fields
- Veterans Memorial Coliseum (2009); Hartmeyer Arena (2010)

League / conference affiliations
- Continental Indoor Football League (2009–2010): West Division (2009)

Playoff appearances (2)
- 2009, 2010

The Wisconsin Wolfpack was an American football franchise based in Wisconsin. The Wolfpack name and brand was used for two teams: an indoor football team in the Continental Indoor Football League and a traditional (outdoor) football team in the Mid Continental Football League.

The indoor team played its home games at the Veterans Memorial Coliseum in Madison, Wisconsin in its inaugural season of 2009, but moved to the Hartmeyer Arena for the 2010 season. The outdoor team was somewhat nomadic throughout its history with regard to where it played its home games, however, outdoor games were generally played in the Milwaukee metropolitan area.

== Indoor history ==
Prior to the Wolfpack franchise's 2008 outdoor campaign, the Milwaukee Bonecrushers of the Continental Indoor Football League approached the Wolfpack coaches and staff and asked them to assist with the completion of their 2008 season following Gilbert Brown's decision to resign as head coach and the resulting resignation of most of the Bonecrushers' staff. Kopac assumed the role of general manager for the Bonecrushers, and brought with him the core coaches of the Wolfpack outdoor team that would later become the core of the Wolfpack indoor team. Kopac led the team to its only win, a 51–46 victory of the Muskegon Thunder.

With infrastructure already in place from the outdoor team, and following the previous year's experience with the Bonecrushers, Wolfpack management announced in early 2009 it would field both indoor and outdoor teams that year. To start the indoor team, Kopac coordinated with Lowe Entertainment, owners of the Rock River Raptors, also in the CIFL, to have Lowe run the indoor franchise while retaining Kopac as head coach. The Wolfpack were Madison's second indoor football franchise and the first to call Madison home since the Madison Mad Dogs folded in 2001.

The Wolfpack played its inaugural season's home games at the Veterans Memorial Coliseum on the campus of the Alliant Energy Center and used AstroTurf previously belonging to the Pensacola Barracudas of AF2. In its inaugural season, the team finished 7–5 and qualified for the CIFL Playoffs, The team started 5–1 but struggled late in the season after former All-American UW-Platteville quarterback Tom Stetzer was lost to injury. The Wolfpack would fall to the eventual undefeated CIFL champion Chicago Slaughter in the 2009 CIFL Western Conference Championship Game, 63–19.

For 2010, the Wolfpack chose to move its home games to the Hartmeyer Arena on the northeast side of Madison. 2010 also saw the team stock its roster with more players from the nearby Wisconsin Badgers football program. Joining defensive lineman Kurt Ware and linebacker James Kamoku from the 2009 Wolfpack would be tight end Andy Crooks, safety Josh Nettles, defensive lineman Ricky Garner, offensive lineman Kenny Jones and, following a season-ending injury to quarterback Brian Ryczkowski, Matt Schabert. Under Schabert's guidance, the Wolfpack had its most successful season to date, indoor or outdoor, finishing the regular season 8–2 and becoming the only team to defeat the then-undefeated Cincinnati Commandos. The Wolfpack would win its first-ever home playoff game, beating the Fort Wayne FireHawks, 25–24, before falling to the Commandos in the 2010 CIFL Championship Game, 54–40, in Cincinnati.

== Season-by-season ==
Season records
Season	W	L	T	Finish	Playoff results
2009	7	5	0	2nd, Western	Lost Western Division Championship (Chicago)
2010	8	2	0	2nd	Won Semifinals (Fort Wayne); Lost CIFL Championship Game (Cincinnati)
Totals	16	9	0	(including playoffs)	

== Outdoor Wolfpack ==
Outdoor Wisconsin Wolfpack

General information
- Founded: 2008
- Folded: 2011
- Stadium: Arrowhead High School, Hartland, Wisconsin (2008); Milwaukee County Sports Complex, Franklin, Wisconsin (2008–2011); Waukesha West High School, Waukesha, Wisconsin (2008); Charles Hart Park, Wauwatosa, Wisconsin (2009–2011); Alan Ameche Field, Kenosha, Wisconsin (2010–2011); Greendale High School, Greendale, Wisconsin (2010–2011)

League / conference affiliations
- North American Football League (2008): Northern Conference, Great Lakes Region, Dells Division (2008); Mid Continental Football League (2009–2010): Western Division (2009)

Championships
- League championships: 0; 1 (Mid-States Tournament, 2010)

=== Season-by-season ===
Season records
Season	W	L	T	Finish	Playoff results
2008	8	2	1	NAFL: 2nd, Dells	Won Round 1 (Kane County); Lost Round 2 (Indianapolis)
2009	3	5	0	MCFL: 3rd, North	
2010	1	6	0	MCFL: T-7th	Mid-States Tournament; Won Round 1 (Chicago Falcons); Won Round 2 (Michigan Gators); NFE Florida Bowl; Lost (Orlando Rage)
Totals	15	15	1	(including playoffs)	

== Racine Raiders merger ==
After much speculation, the Racine Journal Times reported on December 9, 2010, that Jordan Kopac would return to coaching the Racine Raiders in 2011. This effectively marked the end of the Wolfpack as a franchise.
