= 2011 Indianapolis Enforcers season =

- Owner: K. C. Carter
- General manager: K. C. Carter
- Head coach: K. C. Carter
- Home stadium: Travel Team

Results
- Record: 1–9
- League place: 6th
- Playoffs: did not qualify

Uniform
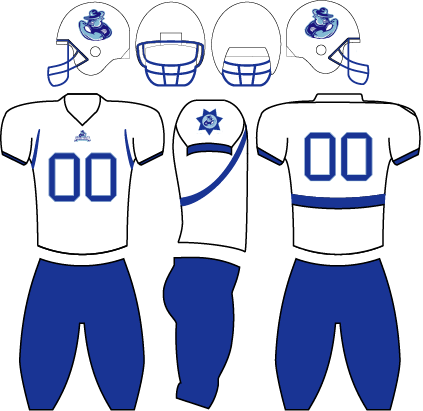

The 2011 Indianapolis Enforcers season was the first season for the Continental Indoor Football League (CIFL) franchise.

The Enforcers came into existence when K.C. Carter, the owner of the Mid-States Football League's Indianapolis Stampede, put together an expansion franchise to compete in the CIFL. Having been involved with football, be it as a player, owner, head coach or league commissioner for over 35 years, Carter wanted to take on the challenge of the indoor football game. He put his team together in just 32 days, acquiring players with the understanding that there would be no pay this year. He did not want to be a team that promised the world and delivered nothing. This team was assembled by invitation only. He found his talent in his semi-pro team, The Stampede, and team USA. He also grabbed a few plays from Central State University, and a few players from the defunct Fort Wayne FireHawks.

Because they joined the CIFL so late, they had no lease to play games in a home arena. This caused the Enforcers to play on the road in 2011, with the hopes of finding a permanent home in 2012. Carter had aspirations that Conseco Field House or the Pepsi Coliseum would be the home for the Enforcers in 2012. On February 26, 2011, the Enforcers lost their first game in franchise history by a score of 69–12 to the Port Huron Predators. On March 19, 2011, the Enforcers gave up a Cincinnati Commandos record 8 touchdown passes to Tyler Sheehan. On April 2, 2011, the Enforcers again became a part of CIFL history, as they gave up a record, 8 rushing touchdowns in a single game, en route to a 78–0 defeat to the Marion Blue Racers. The Enforcers lone victory in its expansion season was a 2–0 forfeit win over the Predators as they failed to finish the season. They finished the season 1–9 and 6th overall.

== Players ==
=== Signings ===
Position	Player	2010 Team
QB	Mike Whitaker	Fort Wayne FireHawks
DB/RB	Ricky Emery	Chicago Cardinals
DT	Michael Cupp	Fort Wayne FireHawks

=== Final roster ===
2011 Indianapolis Enforcers roster
Quarterbacks: 9 DeMarcus Simons; 7 Dean Vinson; 11 Mike Whitaker; Running backs: 2 Ricky Emery; 15 Quentin Harris; 4 DeRon Jenkins; Wide receivers: 6 Anthony Connors; 24 Matthew Midkiff; 5 Troy Summers; 3 Montez Williams	Offensive linemen: 99 Bob Hogan; 93 Joe Jekel; 79 Dontesz Motley; 70 Darnell Taylor; 61 Todd Whitner; Defensive linemen: 95 Michael Cupp; 56 Jawann Hollaway	Linebackers: 51 Zachary Cavanaugh; 44 Caleb Conrad; 14 Ian Picurro; Defensive backs: 21 Jay Cross; 31 Todd Blanton; 12 Karl Jones; 30 Drew Russ; Special teams: currently vacant	Reserve lists: currently vacant; Practice squad: 56 T. J. Baker; 92 Kevin Balfour OL; 61 Jerome Cook OL; 44 Chad Cooper OL/TE; 8 Scott DuVall K; 52 Joel Fravel DL/LB; -- Kyle Harbaugh DL/OL; 9 Kyle Hubbard QB; 23 Dominic Lane DB; 93 Dennis Lloyd Jr.; 22 Robert Payne S; -- Harrison Postis WR; 20 Robert Reed S; 15 Kevin Robbins Jr. LB; 93 Gregory Robinson Jr.; Updated April 8, 2011 rookies in italics 24 Active, 15 Inactive

== Regular season ==
=== Regular season ===
Week	Date	Kickoff	Opponent	Results		Game site
Week	Date	Kickoff	Opponent	Final score	Team record	Game site
1	February 26	7:30 P.M. EST	at Port Huron Predators	L 12–69	0–1	McMorran Arena
2	March 5	7:30 P.M. EDT	at Dayton Silverbacks	L 19–69	0–2	Hara Arena
3	Bye					
4	March 19	7:30 P.M. EDT	at Cincinnati Commandos	L 2–82	0–3	Cincinnati Gardens
5	Bye					
6	April 2	7:30 P.M. EDT	at Marion Blue Racers	L 0–78	0–4	Veterans Memorial Coliseum
7	April 9	7:30 P.M. EDT	Chicago Knights	L 14–42	0–5	10th Street Sports Center
8	April 17	2:30 p.m. CST	at Chicago Knights	L 6–52	0–6	Victory Sports Complex
9	Bye					
10	April 30	7:30 P.M. EDT	at Port Huron Predators	W 2–0 (Forfeit)	1–6	McMorran Arena
11	May 7	7:30 P.M. EDT	at Dayton Silverbacks	L 6–75	1–7	Hara Arena
12	May 14	7:30 P.M. EDT	at Marion Blue Racers	L 12–73	1–8	Veterans Memorial Coliseum
13	May 21	7:30 P.M. EDT	at Cincinnati Commandos	L 0–81	1–9	Cincinnati Gardens
14	Bye					
15	Bye					

=== Standings ===
2011 Continental Indoor Football League
Team	W	L	T	PCT	PF	PA	PF (Avg.)	PA (Avg.)	STK
Cincinnati Commandos-y	10	0	0	1.000	484	158	53.77	17.55	W10
Marion Blue Racers-x	8	2	0	.800	455	218	45.5	21.8	L1
Dayton Silverbacks-x	5	5	0	.500	288	265	32	39.4	W3
Chicago Knights-x	4	6	0	.400	255	295	28.33	32.77	L5
Port Huron Predators	2	8	0	.200	238	226	39.6	37.6	L7
Indianapolis Enforcers	1	9	0	.100	71	621	7.88	69	L3

== Regular season ==
=== Week 1: vs Port Huron Predators ===
Week 1: Indianapolis Enforcers at Port Huron Predators – Game summary

Quarter	1	2	3	4	Total
Enforcers	0	6	0	6	12
Predators	7	14	26	22	69

at McMorran Arena, Port Huron, Michigan

- Date: February 26
- Game time: 7:30 p.m. EDT
- Game attendance: 1,931

Game information

1st quarter

- Port huron – (13:28) Robert Height 13-yard pass from Jim Roth (Rasko Apostolvski kick), Port Huron 7–0

2nd quarter

- Port Huron – (13:23) Levi Raines 11-yard rush (Rasko Apostovlski kick), Port Huron 14–0
- Indianapolis – (6:28) Montez Williams 10-yard pass from Mike Whitaker (Ian Pocurro rush failed), Port Huron 14–6
- Port huron – (4:26) Robert Height 12-yard rush (Rasko Apostovlski kick), Port Huron 21–6

3rd quarter

- Port Huron – (13:26) Levi Raines 11-yard pass from Jim Roth (Rasko Apostovlski kick), Port Huron 28–6
- Port Huron – (7:16) Levi Raines 5-yard rush (Rasko Apostovlski kick failed), Port Huron 34–6
- Port Huron – (5:46) Anthony Calamita 10-yard interception return (Rasko Apostovlski kick), Port Huron 41–6
- Port huron – (0:43) Robert Height 15-yard rush (Ruben Gay rush failed), Port Huron 47–6

4th quarter

- Port huron – (8:40) Anthony Gay 49-yard rush (Rasko Apostovlski kick), Port Huron 54–6
- Indianapolis – (6:43) Montez Williams 24-yard pass from Mike Whitaker (Troy Summers rush failed), Port Huron 54–12
- Port huron – (4:53) Justin McKinny 25-yard kickoff return (Rasko Apostovlski kick), Port Huron 61–12
- Port huron – (2:13) Andre Raines 0-yard fumble recovery (Rasko Apostovlski kick), Port Huron 68–12
- Port huron – (1:27) Team Rouge, Port Huron 69–12

Passing

- Indianapolis – Mike Whitaker: 15/34, 73 yards, 2 TD
- Port huron – Jim Roth: 4/8, 60 yards, 2 TD

Rushing

- Indianapolis – Troy Summers: 2 att, 23 yards, 0 TD
- Port huron – Levi Raines: 7 att, 78 yards, 2 TD

Receiving

- Indianapolis – Montez Williams: 6 rec, 51 yards, 2 TD
- Port huron – Ernie Smith: 1 rec, 23 yards, 0 TD

=== Week 2: vs Dayton Silverbacks ===
The Enforcers fell to the Silverbacks, 13–69. Melvin Bryant caught touchdowns of 27 and 37 yards from Jeremy Greenleaf. Fred Cromartie and Daniel Stover each chipped in with a touchdown catch.

Week 2: Indianapolis Enforcers at Dayton Silverbacks – Game summary

Quarter	1	2	3	4	Total
Enforcers	6	7	0	6	19
Silverbacks	23	27	3	16	69

at Hara Arena, Trotwood, Ohio

- Date: March 5
- Game time: 7:30 p.m. EDT

Game information

1st quarter

- Dayton – (13:20) Melvin Bryant 45-yard pass from Jeremy Greenleaf (Jeff Hubbard kick), Dayton 7–0
- Dayton – (7:51) Fred Cromartie 27-yard pass from Jeremy Greenleaf (Jeff Hubbard kick), Dayton 14–0
- Dayton – (1:14) Daniel Stover 37-yard pass from Jeremy Greenleaf (Jeff Hubbard kick), Dayton 21–0
- Indianapolis – (0:00) Troy Summers 26-yard pass from Mike Whitaker (Scott Duvall kick blocked), Dayton 21–6
- Dayton – (0:00) Donavan Evans PAT return, Dayton 23–6

2nd quarter

- Dayton – (14:20) Victor Jett Jr. 37-yard kickoff return (Jeff Hubbard kick blocked), Dayton 29–6
- Indianapolis – (10:46) Ricky Emery 2-yard rush (Scott Duvall kick), Dayton 29–13
- Dayton – (7:03) Melvin Bryant 32-yard pass from Bruce Jones (Jeff Hubbard kick), Dayton 36–13
- Dayton – (3:12) Ronald Russell 1-yard rush (Jeff Hubbard kick), Dayton 43–13
- Dayton – (0:04) Daniel Stover 6-yard pass from Jeremy Greenleaf (Jeff Hubbard kick), Dayton 50–13

3rd quarter

- Dayton – (9:16) Jeff Hubbard 28-yard field goal, Dayton 53–13

4th quarter

- Dayton – (12:50) Jeff Hubbard 28-yard field goal, Dayton 56–13
- Dayton – (6:59) Marcus Fails 12-yard rush (Jeff Hubbard kick), Dayton 63–13
- Indianapolis – (1:22) Ricky Emery 5-yard pass from Mike Whitaker (DeRon Jenkins rush failed), Dayton 63–19
- Dayton – (0:00) Daniel Stover 22-yard pass from Bruce Jones (none attempted), Dayton 69–19

Passing

- Indianapolis – Mike Whitaker: 12/24, 106 yards, 2 TD
- Dayton – Jeremy Greenleaf: 10/18, 177 yards, 4 TD

Rushing

- Indianapolis – DeRon Jenkins: 2 att, 9 yards, 0 TD
- Dayton – Jeremy Greenleaf: 2 att, 16 yards, 0 TD

Receiving

- Indianapolis – Montez Williams: 4 rec, 31 yards, 0 TD
- Dayton – Melvin Bryant: 5 rec, 117 yards, 2 TD

=== Week 4: vs Cincinnati Commandos ===
Week 4: Indianapolis Enforcers at Cincinnati Commandos – Game summary

Quarter	1	2	3	4	Total
Enforcers	0	2	0	0	2
Commandos	26	20	16	20	82

at Cincinnati Gardens, Cincinnati, Ohio

- Date: March 19
- Game time: 7:30 p.m. EDT

Game information

1st quarter

- Cincinnati – (14:50) Moe Lee 25-yard pass from Tyler Sheehan (Justin McClain kick failed), Cincinnati 6–0
- Cincinnati – (11:51) Jeff Franklin 33-yard interception return (Justin McClain kick failed), Cincinnati 12–0
- Cincinnati – (7:32) Kyenes Mincy 27-yard pass from Tyler Sheehan (Tyler Sheehan pass failed), Cincinnati 18–0
- Cincinnati – (1:41) Brandon Boehm 28-yard pass from Tyler Sheehan (Derrick Moss rush), Cincinnati 26–0

2nd quarter

- Cincinnati – (12:02) Moe Lee 31-yard pass from Tyler Sheehan (Charles Hawkins pass from Tyler Sheehan), Cincinnati 34–0
- Cincinnati – (2:17) Brandon Boehm 25-yard pass from Tyler Sheehan (Justin McClain rush fumbled), Cincinnati 40–0
- Indianapolis – (2:17) Drew Russ PAT return, Cincinnati 40–2
- Cincinnati – (0:02) Thomas Claggett 0-yard fumble recovery (Tyler Sheehan pass failed), Cincinnati 46–2

3rd quarter

- Cincinnati – (10:36) Keith Brooks 2-yard rush (Keith Brooks pass from Tyler Sheehan), Cincinnati 54–2
- Cincinnati – (2:14) Brandon Boehm 21-yard pass from Tyler Sheehan (James Frazier rush), Cincinnati 62–2

4th quarter

- Cincinnati – (4:28) David Wess 13-yard fumble recovery (Frank Straub pass from Tyler Sheehan), Cincinnati 70–2
- Cincinnati – (0:24) Kyenes Mincy 19-yard pass from Tyler Sheehan (James Fraizer rush failed), Cincinnati 76–2
- Cincinnati – (0:02) Kyenes Mincy 2-yard pass from Tyler Sheehan (Keith Brooks rush failed), Cincinnati 82–2

Passing

- Indianapolis – Mike Whitaker: 7/24, 66 yards, 0 TD
- Cincinnati – Tyler Sheehan: 21/31, 289 yards, 8 TD

Rushing

- Indianapolis – DeRon Jenkins: 1 att, 3 yards, 0 TD
- Cincinnati – Keith Brooks: 4 att, 8 yards, 1 TD

Receiving

- Indianapolis – Montez Williams: 4 rec, 30 yards, 0 TD
- Cincinnati – Moe Lee: 6 rec, 108 yards, 2 TD

=== Week 6: vs Marion Blue Racers ===
Week 6: Indianapolis Enforcers at Marion Blue Racers – Game summary

Quarter	1	2	3	4	Total
Enforcers	0	0	0	0	0
Blue Racers	26	27	12	13	78

at Veterans Memorial Coliseum, Marion, Ohio

- Date: April 2
- Game time: 7:30 p.m. EDT
- Game attendance: 1,200
- Referee: Les Anderson

Game information

1st quarter

- Marion – (12:51) Christen Haywood 12-yard rush (Tyler Lorenz kick), Marion 7–0
- Marion – (8:30) Christen Haywood 4-yard rush (Tyler Lorenz kick), Marion 14–0
- Marion – (7:15) Ray Saunders 0-yard fumnble recovery (Tyler Lorenz kick failed), Marion 20–0
- Marion – (1:00) Bryceson Lawrence 35-yard fumnble recovery (Tyler Lorenz kick failed), Marion 26–0

2nd quarter

- Marion – (11:15) Timothy Robinson 8-yard rush (Tyler Lorenz kick), Marion 33–0
- Marion – (6:45) Lorenzo Best 21-yard rush (Tyler Lorenz kick), Marion 40–0
- Marion – (1:30) Antonio Wells 26-yard pass form Timothy Robinson (Tyler Lorenz kick), Marion 47–0
- Marion – (0:46) Ryan Palmer 0-yard fumnble recovery (Tyler Lorenz kick failed), Marion 53–0

3rd quarter

- Marion – (10:00) Jerard Bennett 12-yard rush (Tyler Lorenz kick failed), Marion 59–0
- Marion – (4:30) Christen Haywood 9-yard rush (Tyler Lorenz kick failed), Marion 65–0

4th quarter

- Marion – (13:15) Jerard Bennett 9-yard rush (Tyler Lorenz kick failed), Marion 71–0
- Marion – (10:27) Mike Ellison 22-yard interception return (Tyler Lorenz kick), Marion 78–0

Passing

- Indianapolis – Dean Vinson: 8/26, 40 yards, 0 TD
- Marion – Timothy Robinson: 1/1, 26 yards, 1 TD

Rushing

- Indianapolis – Dean Vinson: 3 att, 14 yards, 0 TD
- Marion – Christen Haywood: 10 att, 57 yards, 3 TD

Receiving

- Indianapolis – Troy Summers: 2 rec, 17 yards, 0 TD
- Marion – Antonio Wells: 1 rec, 26 yards, 1 TD

=== Week 7: vs Chicago Knights ===
Week 7: Chicago Knights at Indianapolis Enforcers – Game summary

Quarter	1	2	3	4	Total
Knights	7	14	14	7	42
Enforcers	0	12	0	2	14

at 10th Street Sports Center, Indianapolis, Indiana

- Date: April 9
- Game time: 7:30 p.m. EDT

Game information

1st quarter

- Chicago – (9:00) Harvery Allen 42-yard interception return (Julie Harshbarger kick), Chicago 7–0

2nd quarter

- Chicago – (3:35) Willie Tolon 7-yard pass from Ron Ricciardi (Julie Harshbarger kick), Chicago 14–0
- Indianapolis – (0:41) Ricky Emery 8-yard pass from DeMarcus Simons (Ian Pocurro kick failed), Chicago 14–6
- Chicago – (0:15) Willie Tolon 1-yard rush (Julie Harshbarger kick), Chicago 21–6
- Indianapolis – (0:03) Troy Summers 32-yard pass from DeMarcus Simons (DeMarcus Simons rush failed), Chicago 21–12

3rd quarter

- Chicago – (6:35) Ron Ricciardi 2-yard rush (Julie Harsbharger kick), Chicago 28–12
- Chicago – (0:00) Willie Tolon 13-yard pass from Ron Ricciardi (Julie Harshbarger kick), Chicago 35–12

4th quarter

- Chicago – (5:30) Brandon Wogoman 1-yard rush (Julie Harshbarger kick), Marion 42–12
- Indianapolis – (0:00) Joel Fravel safety, Chicago 42–14

Passing

- Chicago – Ron Ricciardi: 12/16, 112 yards, 2 TD
- Indianapolis – DeMarcus Simons: 11/24, 130 yards, 2 TD

Rushing

- Chicago – James Chicon: 7 att, 34 yards, 0 TD
- Indianapolis – Ricky Emery: 8 att, 29 yards, 0 TD

Receiving

- Chicago – Willie Tolon: 5 rec, 49 yards, 2 TD
- Indianapolis – Troy Summers: 3 rec, 47 yards, 1 TD

=== Week 8: vs Chicago Knights ===
Week 8: Indianapolis Enforcers at Chicago Knights – Game summary

Quarter	1	2	3	4	Total
Enforcers	0	6	0	0	6
Knights	6	23	9	14	52

at Victory Sports Complex, Loves Park, Illinois

- Date: April 17
- Game time: 2:30 p.m. CDT
- Game attendance: 170
- Referee: Tommy Tyks

Game information

1st quarter

- Chicago – (11:45) Mike Williams 2-yard rush (Julie Harshbarger kick failed), Chicago 6–0

2nd quarter

- Chicago – (14:52) Julie Harshbarger 23-yard field goal, Chicago 9–0
- Chicago – (10:04) J Openga 14-yard pass from Ron Ricciardi (Julie Harshbarger kick), Chicago 16–0
- Chicago – (10:04) Team Rouge, Chicago 17–0
- Chicago – (6:01) Julie Harshbarger 20-yard field goal, Chicago 20–0
- Indianapolis – (1:59) DeMarcus Simons 1-yard rush (DeMarcus Simons pass failed), Chicago 20–6
- Chicago – (0:24) James Chicon 1-yard rush (Zac Peterson rush failed), Chicago 26–6
- Chicago – (0:00) Julie Harshbarger 17-yard field goal, Chicago 29–6

3rd quarter

- Chicago – (6:24) Zontavius Johnson 12-yard pass from Ron Ricciardi (Julie Harshbarger kick), Chicago 36–6
- Chicago – (3:32) Team Safety, Chicago 38–6

4th quarter

- Chicago – (6:18) J Openga 38-yard pass from Brandon Jewett (Julie Harshbarger kick), Chicago 45–6
- Chicago – (0:12) Mike Williams 11-yard rush (Julie Harshbarger kick failed), Chicago 52–6

Passing

- Indianapolis – DeMarcus Simons: 7/22, 43 yards, 0 TD
- Chicago – Ron Ricciardi: 8/18, 82 yards, 2 TD

Rushing

- Indianapolis – DeMarcus Simons: 9 att, 19 yards, 1 TD
- Chicago – Mike Williams: 9 att, 47 yards, 2 TD

Receiving

- Indianapolis – Karl Jones: 4 rec, 34 yards, 0 TD
- Chicago – Zontavius Johnson: 4 rec, 36 yards, 1 TD

=== Week 10: vs Port Huron Predators ===
Week 10: Indianapolis Enforcers at Port Huron Predators – Game summary

Quarter	1	2	3	4	Total
Enforcers	2	0	0	0	2
Predators	0	0	0	0	0

at McMorran Arena, Port Huron, Michigan

- Date: April 30
- Game time: 7:30 p.m. EDT

Game information
Port Huron Forfeit

=== Week 11: vs Dayton Silverbacks ===
Week 11: Indianapolis Enforcers at Dayton Silverbacks – Game summary

Quarter	1	2	3	4	Total
Enforcers	6	0	0	0	6
Silverbacks	14	25	15	21	75

at Hara Arena, Trotwood, Ohio

- Date: May 7
- Game time: 7:30 p.m. EDT

Game information

1st quarter

- Dayton – (13:55) Melvin Bryant 15-yard pass from Bruce Jones(Jeff Hubbard kick), Dayton 7–0
- Indianapolis – (10:22) DeMarcus Simons 1-yard rush (DeMarcus Simons pass intercepted), Dayton 7–6
- Dayton – (7:43) Ronald Russell 3-yard rush (Jeff Hubbard kick), Dayton 14–6

2nd quarter

- Dayton – (11:24) Bruce Jones 3-yard rush (Jeff Hubbard kick failed), Dayton 20–6
- Dayton – (7:08) Neimiah Simons 37-yard fumble return (Jeff Hubbard kick failed), Dayton 26–6
- Dayton – (0:55) Ronald Russell 6-yard rush (Jeff Hubbard kick), Dayton 33–6
- Dayton – (0:07) Daniel Stover 2-yard pass from Bruce Jones (Jeff Hubbard kick failed), Dayton 39–6

3rd quarter

- Dayton – (9:10) S Spencer safety, Dayton 41–6
- Dayton – (6:59) Marque Jones 16-yard pass from Bruce Jones (Jeff Hubbard kick failed), Dayton 47–6
- Dayton – (2:26) Marque Jones 12-yard pass from Bruce Jones (Jeff Hubbard kick), Dayton 54–6

4th quarter

- Dayton – (7:10) Jarvis Taylor 11-yard rush (Daniel Stover rush), Dayton 62–6
- Dayton – (5:14) Austin Goss 13-yard fumble return (Jeff Hubbard kick failed), Dayton 68–6
- Dayton – (1:14) Daniel Stover 0-yard fumble return (Jeff Hubbard kick), Dayton 75–6

Passing

- Indianapolis – DaMarcus Simons: 8/19, 37 yards, 0 TD
- Dayton – Bruce Jones: 7/12, 84 yards, 4 TD

Rushing

- Indianapolis – DeMarcus Simons: 11 att, 28 yards, 1 TD
- Dayton – Ronald Russell: 6 att, 39 yards, 2 TD

Receiving

- Indianapolis – Montez Williams: 1 rec, 20 yards, 0 TD
- Dayton – Daniel Stover: 2 rec, 31 yards, 1 TD

=== Week 12: vs Marion Blue Racers ===
Week 12: Indianapolis Enforcers at Marion Blue Racers – Game summary

Quarter	1	2	3	4	Total
Enforcers	6	6	0	0	12
Blue Racers	0	32	14	27	73

at Veterans Memorial Coliseum, Marion, Ohio

- Date: May 14
- Game time: 7:30 p.m. EDT
- Game attendance: 1,100
- Referee: Tommy Tyks

Game information

1st quarter

- Indianapolis – (10:00) Montez Williams 2-yard pass from DeMarcus Simons (Darnell Taylor rush failed), Indianapolis 6–0

2nd quarter

- Marion – (14:47) Christen Haywood 10-yard rush (Tyler Lorenz kick), Marion 7–6
- Marion – (14:16) Team Rouge, Marion 8–6
- Marion – (8:00) Tyler Lorenz 31-yard field goal, Marion 11–6
- Indianapolis – (5:00) Shannon Russell 29-yard pass from DeMarcus Simons (DeMarcus Simons pass failed), Indianapolis 12–11
- Marion – (2:25) Brandon Williams 4-yard pass from Josh Harris (Tyler Lorenz kick failed), Marion 17–12
- Marion – (1:00) Mike Tatum 32-yard pass from Josh Harris (Tyler Lorenz kick), Marion 24–12
- Marion – (0:10) Brandon Williams 26-yard pass form Josh Harris (Ryan Palmer pass form Mark Huddleston), Marion 32–12

3rd quarter

- Marion – (13:45) Mark Huddleston 4-yard rush (Tyler Lorenz kick), Marion 39–12
- Marion – (8:35) Mark Huddleston 35-yard pass form Josh Harris (Tyler Lorenz kick), Marion 46–12

4th quarter

- Marion – (14:15) Mike Tatum 41-yard pass from Josh Harris (Tyler Lorenz kick), Marion 53–12
- Marion – (8:41) Mark Huddleston 18-yard rush (Tyler Lorenz kick), Marion 60–12
- Marion – (5:30) J Dorn 28-yard fumble recovery (Tyler Lorenz kick), Marion 67–12
- Marion – (0:00) Victor Tolbert 32-yard rush (None Attempted), Marion 73–12

Passing

- Indianapolis – DeMarcus Simons: 13/20, 108 yards, 2 TD
- Marion – Josh Harris: 7/11, 140 yards, 5 TD

Rushing

- Indianapolis – DeMarcus Simons: 12 att, 51 yards, 0 TD
- Marion – Victor Tolbert: 2 att, 38 yards, 1 TD

Receiving

- Indianapolis – Shannon Russell: 4 rec, 41 yards, 1 TD
- Marion – Mike Tatum: 3 rec, 76 yards, 2 TD

=== Week 13: vs Cincinnati Commandos ===
Week 13: Indianapolis Enforcers at Cincinnati Commandos – Game summary

Quarter	1	2	3	4	Total
Enforcers	0	0	0	0	0
Commandos	14	15	26	26	81

at Cincinnati Gardens, Cincinnati, Ohio

- Date: May 21
- Game time: 7:30 p.m. EDT
- Referee: Tommy Tyks

Game information

1st quarter

- Cincinnati – (12:42) George Murray 12-yard pass from Tyler Sheehan (Brandon Yingling kick failed), Cincinnati 6–0
- Cincinnati – (2:05) Tyler Sheehan 1-yard rush (Frank Straub pass from Tyler Sheehan), Cincinnati 14–0

2nd quarter

- Cincinnati – (12:57) Brandon Boehm 24-yard pass from Tyler Sheehan (George Murray pass from Tyler Sheehan), Cincinnati 22–0
- Cincinnati – (10:03) Kyenes Mincy 5-yard pass from Tyler Sheehan (Brandon Yingling kick), Cincinnati 29–0

3rd quarter

- Cincinnati – (13:56) Kyenes Mincy 27-yard pass from Tyler Sheehan (Brandon Yingling kick), Cincinnati 36–0
- Cincinnati – (11:45) Phillip Barnett 2-yard pass from George Murray (Brandon Yingling kick failed), Cincinnati 42–0
- Cincinnati – (6:12) Keith Brooks 3-yard rush (Brandon Yingling kick), Cincinnati 49–0
- Cincinnati – (0:21) Phillip Barnett 19-yard pass from George Murray (Brandon Boehm pass failed), Cincinnati 55–0

4th quarter

- Cincinnati – (11:00) Kyenes Mincy 32-yard pass from George Murray (Brandon Yingling kick), Cincinnati 62–0
- Cincinnati – (5:31) Phillip Barnett 19-yard pass from George Murray (Brandon Yingling kick failed), Cincinnati 68–0
- Cincinnati – (3:30) Jeff Franklin 23-yard interception return (Brandon Yingling kick failed), Cincinnati 74–0
- Cincinnati – (0:23) Wendell Brown 0-yard fumble recovery (Brandon Yingling kick), Cincinnati 81–0

Passing

- Indianapolis – DeMarcus Simons: 5/21, 37 yards, 0 TD
- Cincinnati – George Murray: 8/11, 112 yards, 4 TD

Rushing

- Indianapolis – Darnell Taylor: 3 att, 3 yards, 0 TD
- Cincinnati – Greg Moore: 2 att, 32 yards, 0 TD

Receiving

- Indianapolis – Montez Williams: 2 rec, 9 yards, 0 TD
- Cincinnati – Phillip Barnett: 5 rec, 64 yards, 3 TD

== Stats ==
=== Passing ===
Player	Comp.	Att.	Comp%	Yards	TD's	INT's	Rating
DeMarcus Simons	44	106	41.5%	355	4	12	88.8
Mike Whitaker	34	82	41.5%	245	4	10	49.1
Dean Vinson	12	46	26.1%	61	0	8	0.0

=== Rushing ===
Player	Car.	Yards	Avg.	TD's	Long
DeMarcus Simons	48	70	1.5	2	16
Ricky Emery	11	34	3.1	1	8
Troy Summers	13	28	2.2	0	16
Darnell Taylor	11	27	2.5	0	13

=== Receiving ===
Player	Rec.	Yards	Avg.	TD's	Long
Montez Williams	23	210	9.1	3	24
Troy Summers	12	185	11.7	3	36
Ricky Emery	7	70	10.0	2	21
Karl Jones	6	51	8.5	0	15

Stats reference

== See also ==
- The Forum at Fishers
- 2012 Indianapolis Enforcers season
