= 2011 Dayton Silverbacks season =

Indoor football team season

- Owner: Jeff Kolaczkowski
- General manager: April Shellenberger
- Head coach: Derrick Shepard
- Home stadium: Hara Arena; 1001 Shiloh Springs Road; Trotwood, OH 45415

Results
- Record: 5-5
- League place: 3rd
- Playoffs: Lost Semifinals 18-53 (Blue Racers)

Uniform
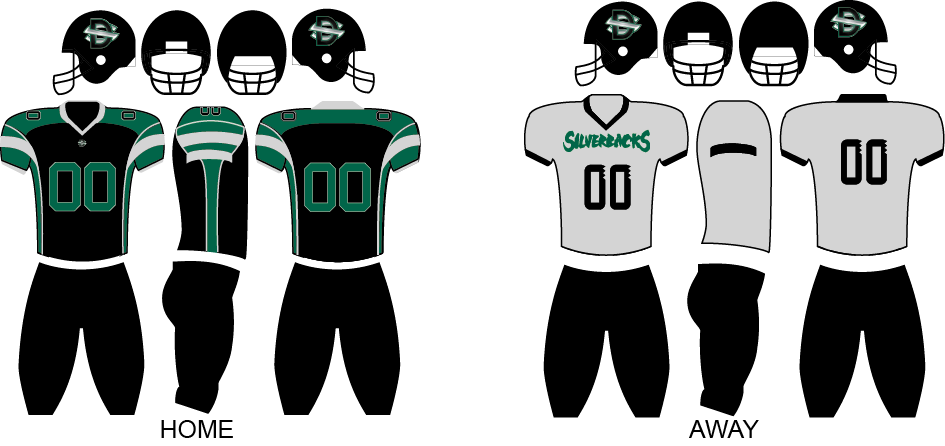

The 2011 Dayton Silverbacks season was the sixth season for the Continental Indoor Football League (CIFL) franchise. In 2011, the Silverbacks saw several changes. They changed the franchise name from the "Miami Valley Silverbacks" to the "Dayton Silverbacks" and found a home arena in Hara Arena in Trotwood, Ohio. The Silverbacks brought back Derrick Shepard to coach the team after Brian Wells took a job with the Commandos. The Silverbacks continued their success from the following season, finished with a franchise best .500 winning percentage, and a second consecutive playoff appearance. They would go on to lose in the Semi-finals to the Marion Blue Racers.

== Standings ==
2011 Continental Indoor Football League
Team	W	L	T	PCT	PF	PA	PF (Avg.)	PA (Avg.)	STK
Cincinnati Commandos-y	10	0	0	1.000	484	158	53.77	17.55	W10
Marion Blue Racers-x	8	2	0	.800	455	218	45.5	21.8	L1
Dayton Silverbacks-x	5	5	0	.500	288	265	32	39.4	W3
Chicago Knights-x	4	6	0	.400	255	295	28.33	32.77	L5
Port Huron Predators	2	8	0	.200	238	226	39.6	37.6	L7
Indianapolis Enforcers	1	9	0	.100	71	621	7.88	69	L3

y - clinched regular-season title

x - clinched playoff spot

== Schedule ==
Week	Date	Opponent	Home/Away	Result
1		Bye	Week	
2	March 5	Indianapolis Enforcers	Home	Won 69-19
3		Bye	Week	
4	March 19	Port Huron Predators	Away	Lost 34-61
5	March 26	Marion Blue Racers	Away	Lost 13-34
6	April 2	Cincinnati Commandos	Home	Lost 15-32
7	April 9	Marion Blue Racers	Home	Lost 14-31
8		Bye	Week	
9	April 23	Chicago Knights	Away	Won 24-21
10	April 29	Cincinnati Commandos	Away	Lost 7-41
11	May 7	Indianapolis Enforcers	Home	Won 75-6
12	May 13	Chicago Knights	Home	Won 37-20
13		Bye	Week	
14	May 26	Port Huron Predators	Home	Won 2-0 (Forfeit)
15		Bye	Week	

== Playoff Schedule ==
Week	Date	Opponent	Home/Away	Result
CIFL Semifinals	June 6	Marion Blue Racers	Away	Lost 18-53

== Roster ==
2011 Dayton Silverbacks roster
Quarterbacks: 12 Bruce Jones; 1 Jarvis Taylor; Running backs: 22 Ronald Russell; Wide receivers: 8 Melvin Bryant; 80 Victor Jett Jr.; 18 Marque Jones; 11 Daniel Stover QB/WR	Offensive linemen: 88 Justin Barnett OL/TE; 70 Michael Melampy; 50 E Starks; Defensive linemen: 33 Thaddeus Crosby; 52 James Spikes; 55 Shawn Stewart; Linebackers: 48 Johnny Wright; 44 Marcus Young	Defensive backs: 15 Mychal Davis; 7 Donavan Evans; 10 Vitario Jones; 37 Chris Respress; 2 Neimiah Simons; Kickers: 84 Jeff Hubbard	Injured reserve: currently vacant; Inactive: 55 Adam Bradley OL; 12 Isaiah Cheatham WR; 1 Fred Cromartie WR; 33 Josh Davis DL; 3 Marcus Fails RB/WR; 16 Jeremy Greenleaf QB; 75 Trent Marlow OL; 18 Chris Stanford QB/WR; 50 Kevin West OL; Updated 2011-05-26 rookies in italics 22 Active, 9 Inactive

== Stats ==
=== Passing ===
Player	Comp.	Att.	Comp%	Yards	TD's	INT's	Rating
Jeremy Greenleaf	22	54	40.7%	342	5	4	88.1
Bruce Jones	26	48	54.2%	366	11	4	99.3
Chris Stanford	14	44	31.8%	169	2	7	80.7
Jarvis Taylor	7	27	25.9%	41	1	2	39.6

=== Rushing ===
Player	Car.	Yards	Avg.	TD's	Long
Ronald Russell	37	119	3.2	5	15
Chris Stanford	15	93	6.2	1	19
Daniel Stover	12	87	7.2	1	20
Victor Tolbert	18	51	2.8	0	14

=== Receiving ===
Player	Rec.	Yards	Avg.	TD's	Long
Melvin Bryant	24	370	15.4	6	45
Daniel Stover	22	397	18	11	39
Fred Cromartie	14	97	6.9	1	27
Marcus Fails	6	33	5.5	0	14

== Regular season ==
=== Week 2: vs Indianapolis Enforcers ===
Week 2: Indianapolis Enforcers at Dayton Silverbacks – Game summary

Quarter	1	2	3	4	Total
Enforcers	6	7	0	6	19
Silverbacks	23	27	3	16	69

at Hara Arena, Trotwood, Ohio

- Date: March 5
- Game time: 7:30 p.m. EDT

Game information

1st quarter

- Dayton – (13:20) Melvin Bryant 45-yard pass from Jeremy Greenleaf (Jeff Hubbard kick), Dayton 7–0
- Dayton – (7:51) Fred Cromartie 27-yard pass from Jeremy Greenleaf (Jeff Hubbard kick), Dayton 14–0
- Dayton - (1:14) Daniel Stover 37-yard pass from Jeremy Greenleaf (Jeff Hubbard kick), Dayton 21-0
- Indianapolis - (0:00) Troy Summers 26-yard pass from Mike Whitaker (Scott Duvall kick blocked), Dayton 21-6
- Dayton - (0:00) Donavan Evans PAT return, Dayton 23-6

2nd quarter

- Dayton - (14:20) Victor Jett Jr. 37-yard kickoff return (Jeff Hubbard kick blocked), Dayton 29-6
- Indianapolis - (10:46) Ricky Emery 2-yard rush (Scott Duvall kick), Dayton 29-13
- Dayton – (7:03) Melvin Bryant 32-yard pass from Bruce Jones (Jeff Hubbard kick), Dayton 36–13
- Dayton – (3:12) Ronald Russell 1-yard rush (Jeff Hubbard kick), Dayton 43–13
- Dayton - (0:04) Daniel Stover 6-yard pass from Jeremy Greenleaf (Jeff Hubbard kick), Dayton 50-13

3rd quarter

- Dayton – (9:16) Jeff Hubbard 28-yard field goal, Dayton 53–13

4th quarter

- Dayton – (12:50) Jeff Hubbard 28-yard field goal, Dayton 56–13
- Dayton - (6:59) Marcus Fails 12-yard rush (Jeff Hubbard kick), Dayton 63-13
- Indianapolis - (1:22) Ricky Emery 5-yard pass from Mike Whitaker (DeRon Jenkins rush failed), Dayton 63-19
- Dayton - (0:00) Daniel Stover 22-yard pass from Bruce Jones (none attempted), Dayton 69-19

Passing

- Indianapolis – Mike Whitaker: 12/24, 106 yards, 2 TD
- Dayton – Jeremy Greenleaf: 10/18, 177 yards, 4 TD

Rushing

- Indianapolis – DeRon Jenkins: 2 att, 9 yards, 0 TD
- Dayton – Jeremy Greenleaf: 2 att, 16 yards, 0 TD

Receiving

- Indianapolis – Montez Williams: 4 rec, 31 yards, 0 TD
- Dayton – Melvin Bryant: 5 rec, 117 yards, 2 TD

=== Week 4: vs Port Huron Predators ===
Week 4: Dayton Silverbacks at Port Huron Predators – Game summary

Quarter	1	2	3	4	Total
Silverbacks	13	7	8	6	34
Predators	13	23	18	7	61

at McMorran Arena, Port Huron, Michigan

- Date: March 19
- Game time: 7:30 p.m. EDT
- Game attendance: 1,700

Game information

1st quarter

- Dayton – (8:45) Daniel Stover 7-yard pass from Jeremy Greenleaf (Jeff Hubbard kick), Dayton 7–0
- Port huron – (5:57) Robert Height 7-yard rush (Anthony Gay kick blocked), Dayton 7–6
- Port Huron - (1:15) Devon Daniels 22-yard pass from Jim Roth (Anthony Gay kick), Port Huron 13-7
- Dayton - (0:24) Fred Cromartie 45-yard kickoff return (Jeff Hubbard kick failed), 13-13

2nd quarter

- Port Huron - (11:17) Jeff Dempowske safety, Port Huron 15-13
- Port Huron - (11:13) Levi Raines 28-yard rush (Levi Raines rush), Port Huron 23-13
- Dayton - (7:37) Fred Cromartie 4-yard rush (Jeff Hubbard kick), Port Huron 23-20
- Port huron – (5:51) Terry Mitchell 34-yard pass from Jim Roth (Anthony Gay kick), Port Huron 30–20
- Port huron – (1:51) Roger Sippio 32-yard interception return (Jeff Hubbard kick), Port Huron 36–20

3rd quarter

- Port Huron - (14:04) Robert Height 16-yard rush (Anthony Gay kick), Port Huron 43-20
- Port huron – (6:41) Anthony Gay 27-yard field goal, Port Huron 46–20
- Port Huron - (5:46) Devon Daniels 40-yard fumble return (Robert Height rush), Port Huron 54-20
- Dayton - (2:14) Melvin Bryant 34-yard pass from Bruce Jones (Melvin Bryant pass from Bruce Jones), Port Huron 54-28

4th quarter

- Port Huron - (5:42) Devon Daniels 22-yard pass from Jim Roth (Anthony Gay kick), Port Huron 61-28
- Dayton - (0:00) Daniel Stover 39-yard pass from Bruce Jones (none attempted), Port Huron 61-34

Passing

- Dayton – Jeremy Greenleaf: 6/19, 61 yards, 1 TD
- Port huron – Jim Roth: 5/11, 92 yards, 3 TD

Rushing

- Dayton – Marcus Fails: 3 att, 7 yards, 0 TD
- Port huron – Robert Height: 10 att, 48 yards, 2 TD

Receiving

- Dayton – Melvin Bryant: 5 rec, 87 yards, 1 TD
- Port huron – Terry Mitchell: 3 rec, 48 yards, 1 TD

=== Week 5: vs Marion Blue Racers ===
Week 5: Dayton Silverbacks at Marion Blue Racers – Game summary

Quarter	1	2	3	4	Total
Silverbacks	7	0	0	6	13
Blue Racers	13	18	3	0	34

at Veterans Memorial Coliseum, Marion, Ohio

- Date: March 26
- Game time: 7:30 p.m. EDT
- Game attendance: 1,300
- Referee: Rick Jackson

Game information

1st quarter

- Dayton – (10:15) Daniel Stover 34-yard pass from Bruce Jones (Jeff Hubbard kick), Dayton 7–0
- Marion – (7:32) Bryceson Lawrence 0-yard fumble recovery (Tyler Lorenz kick), 7–7
- Marion - (3:32) Mike Tatum 46-yard pass from Josh Harris (Tyler Lorenz kick blocked), Marion 13-7

2nd quarter

- Marion - (4:12) Christen Haywood 4-yard rush (Tyler Lorenz kick), Marion 20-7
- Marion - (1:23) Brandon Williams 38-yard pass from Josh Harris (Brandon Williams pass from Josh Harris), Marion 28-7
- Marion – (0:00) Tyler Lorenz 36-yard field goal, Marion 31–7

3rd quarter

- Marion – (13:00) Tyler Lorenz 43-yard field goal, Marion 34–7

4th quarter

- Dayton - (1:41) Melvin Bryant 14-yard pass from Daniel Stover (Victor Tolbert rush failed), Marion 34-13

Passing

- Dayton – Daniel Stover: 4/18, 35 yards, 1 TD
- Marion – Josh Harris: 12/21, 179 yards, 2 TD

Rushing

- Dayton – Daniel Stover: 9 att, 87 yards, 0 TD
- Marion – Christen Haywood: 5 att, 8 yards, 1 TD

Receiving

- Dayton – Melvin Bryant: 3 rec, 29 yards, 1 TD
- Marion – Antonio Wells: 4 rec, 53 yards, 0 TD

=== Week 6: vs Cincinnati Commandos ===
Week 6: Cincinnati Commandos at Dayton Silverbacks – Game summary

Quarter	1	2	3	4	Total
Commandos	14	0	6	12	32
Silverbacks	0	9	6	0	15

at Hara Arena, Trotwood, Ohio

- Date: April 2
- Game time: 7:30 p.m. EDT

Game information

1st quarter

- Cincinnati – (10:13) Greg Moore 1-yard rush (Brandon Yingling kick), Cincinnati 7–0
- Cincinnati – (6:00) Derrick Moss 1-yard rush (Brandon Yingling kick), Cincinnati 14–0

2nd quarter

- Dayton - (14:13) Daniel Stover 32-yard pass from Chris Stanford (Jeff Hubbard kick failed), Cincinnati 14-6
- Dayton – (4:25) Jeff Hubbard 23-yard field goal, Cincinnati 14–9

3rd quarter

- Dayton - (13:53) Daniel Stover 27-yard pass from Chris Stanford (Jeff Hubbard kick failed), Dayton 15-14
- Cincinnati - (11:18) Greg Moore 13-yard pass from Tyler Sheehan (Derrick Moss rush failed), Cincinnati 20-15

4th quarter

- Cincinnati - (5:02) Greg Moore 2-yard rush (Tyler Sheehan pass failed), Cincinnati 26-15
- Cincinnati - (2:22) Moe Lee 11-yard pass from Tyler Sheehan (Tyler Sheehan pass failed), Cincinnati 32-15

Passing

- Cincinnati – Tyler Sheehan: 16/35, 188 yards, 2 TD
- Dayton – Chris Stanford: 9/19, 121 yards, 2 TD

Rushing

- Cincinnati – Greg Moore: 10 att, 14 yards, 1 TD
- Dayton – Chris Stanford: 5 att, 45 yards, 0 TD

Receiving

- Cincinnati – Brandon Boehm: 4 rec, 66 yards, 0 TD
- Dayton – Daniel Stover: 4 rec, 100 yards, 2 TD

=== Week 7: vs Marion Blue Racers ===
Week 7: Marion Blue Racers at Dayton Silverbacks – Game summary

Quarter	1	2	3	4	Total
Blue Racers	9	6	10	6	31
Silverbacks	7	0	7	0	14

at Hara Arena, Trotwood, Ohio

- Date: April 9
- Game time: 7:30 p.m. EDT
- Referee: Les Anderson

Game information

1st quarter

- Dayton – (14:49) Fred Cromartie 54-yard kickoff return (Jeff Hubbard kick), Dayton 7–0
- Marion – (8:09) Michael Cross safety, Dayton 7–2
- Marion - (5:50) Christen Haywood 2-yard rush (Tyler Lorenz kick), Marion 9-7

2nd quarter

- Marion - (0:05) Brandon Williams 14-yard pass from Josh Harris (Tyler Lorenz kick failed), Marion 15-7

3rd quarter

- Marion - (13:53) Brandon Williams 37-yard pass from Josh Harris (Tyler Lorenz kick), Marion 22-7
- Dayton - (11:44) Chris Stanford 1-yard rush (Jeff Hubbard kick), Marion 22-14
- Marion – (8:19) Tyler Lorenz 37-yard field goal, Marion 25–14

4th quarter

- Marion - (2:47) Josh Harris 9-yard rush (Tyler Lorenz kick failed), Marion 31-14

Passing

- Marion – Josh Harris: 13/21, 107 yards, 2 TD
- Dayton – Chris Stanford: 4/17, 43 yards, 0 TD

Rushing

- Marion – Josh Harris: 9 att, 47 yards, 1 TD
- Dayton – Chris Stanford: 6 att, 37 yards, 0 TD

Receiving

- Marion – Brandon Williams: 5 rec, 77 yards, 2 TD
- Dayton – Fred Cromartie: 2 rec, 7 yards, 0 TD

=== Week 9: vs Chicago Knights ===
Week 9: Dayton Silverbacks at Chicago Knights – Game summary

Quarter	1	2	3	4	Total
Silverbacks	7	14	3	0	24
Knights	11	3	7	0	21

at Victory Sports Complex, Loves Park, Illinois

- Date: April 22
- Game time: 7:30 p.m. CDT
- Game attendance: 210
- Referee: Tommy Tyks

Game information

1st quarter

- Chicago – (15:00) Shawn McKeown rouge, Chicago 1–0
- Chicago – (11:55) Gemayel Cowseer 12-yard interception return (Julie Harshbarger kick), 8–0
- Chicago – (6:41) Julie Harshbarger 23-yard field goal, Chicago 11-0
- Dayton – (4:44) Ronald Russell 2-yard rush (Jeff Hubbard kick), Chicago 11–7

2nd quarter

- Chicago – (14:16) Julie Harshbarger 25-yard field goal, Chicago 14-7
- Dayton – (0:44) Ronald Russell 5-yard rush (Jeff Hubbard kick), 14–14
- Dayton – (00:26) Viterio Jones 30-yard interception return (Jeff Hubbard kick), 21–14

3rd quarter

- Dayton – (7:35) Jeff Hubbard 25-yard field goal, Dayton 24-14
- Chicago - (2:18) Brandon Wogoman 9-yard pass from Brandon Jewett (Julie Harshbarger kick), Dayton 24-21

4th quarter

Passing

- Dayton – Jeremy Greenleaf: 6/17, 104 yards, 0 TD
- Chicago – Brandon Jewett: 4/10, 30 yards, 1 TD

Rushing

- Dayton – Victor Tolbert: 8 att, 24 yards, 0 TD
- Chicago – Dante Washington: 4 att, 6 yards, 0 TD

Receiving

- Dayton – Melvin Bryant: 3 rec, 70 yards, 0 TD
- Chicago – Willie Tolon: 4 rec, 17 yards, 0 TD

=== Week 10: vs Cincinnati Commandos ===
Week 10: Cincinnati Commandos at Dayton Silverbacks – Game summary

Quarter	1	2	3	4	Total
Silverbacks	0	7	0	0	7
Commandos	14	7	7	13	41

at Cincinnati Gardens, Cincinnati, Ohio

- Date: April 29
- Game time: 8:05 p.m. EDT
- Referee: Les Anderson

Game information

1st quarter

- Cincinnati – (6:24) Tyler Sheehan 5-yard rush (Brandon Yingling kick), Cincinnati 7–0
- Cincinnati – (1:28) Marcus Spencer 51-yard interception return (Brandon Yingling kick), Cincinnati 14–0

2nd quarter

- Dayton - (13:33) Daniel Stover 6-yard pass from Jarvis Taylor (Jeff Hubbard kick), Cincinnati 14-7
- Cincinnati – (2:11) Tyler Sheehan 1-yard rush (Brandon Yingling kick), Cincinnati 21–7

3rd quarter

- Cincinnati - (8:06) Greg Moore 6-yard rush (Brandon Yingling kick), Cincinnati 28-7

4th quarter

- Cincinnati - (9:55) Derrick Moss 1-yard rush (Brandon Yingling kick), Cincinnati 35-7
- Cincinnati - (5:43) Phillip Barnett 30-yard pass from Tyler Sheehan (Brandon Yingling kick failed), Cincinnati 41-7

Passing

- Dayton – Jarvis Taylor: 6/19, 40 yards, 1 TD
- Cincinnati – Tyler Sheehan: 10/21, 113 yards, 1 TD

Rushing

- Dayton – Ronald Russell: 7 att, 13 yards, 0 TD
- Cincinnati – Greg Moore: 7 att, 42 yards, 1 TD

Receiving

- Dayton – Daniel Stover: 3 rec, 28 yards, 1 TD
- Cincinnati – Phillip Barnett: 2 rec, 50 yards, 1 TD

=== Week 11: vs Indianapolis Enforcers ===
Week 11: Indianapolis Enforcers at Dayton Silverbacks – Game summary

Quarter	1	2	3	4	Total
Enforcers	6	0	0	0	6
Silverbacks	14	25	15	21	75

at Hara Arena, Trotwood, Ohio

- Date: May 7
- Game time: 7:30 p.m. EDT
- Referee: Dave Stein

Game information

1st quarter

- Dayton – (13:55) Melvin Bryant 15-yard pass from Bruce Jones(Jeff Hubbard kick), Dayton 7–0
- Indianapolis - (10:22) DeMarcus Simons 1-yard rush (DeMarcus Simons pass intercepted), Dayton 7-6
- Dayton – (7:43) Ronald Russell 3-yard rush (Jeff Hubbard kick), Dayton 14–6

2nd quarter

- Dayton - (11:24) Bruce Jones 3-yard rush (Jeff Hubbard kick failed), Dayton 20-6
- Dayton - (7:08) Neimiah Simons 37-yard fumble return (Jeff Hubbard kick failed), Dayton 26-6
- Dayton – (0:55) Ronald Russell 6-yard rush (Jeff Hubbard kick), Dayton 33–6
- Dayton - (0:07) Daniel Stover 2-yard pass from Bruce Jones (Jeff Hubbard kick failed), Dayton 39-6

3rd quarter

- Dayton – (9:10) S Spencer safety, Dayton 41–6
- Dayton – (6:59) Marque Jones 16-yard pass from Bruce Jones (Jeff Hubbard kick failed), Dayton 47–6
- Dayton – (2:26) Marque Jones 12-yard pass from Bruce Jones (Jeff Hubbard kick), Dayton 54–6

4th quarter

- Dayton – (7:10) Jarvis Taylor 11-yard rush (Daniel Stover rush), Dayton 62–6
- Dayton - (5:14) Austin Goss 13-yard fumble return (Jeff Hubbard kick failed), Dayton 68-6
- Dayton - (1:14) Daniel Stover 0-yard fumble return (Jeff Hubbard kick), Dayton 75-6

Passing

- Indianapolis – DaMarcus Simons: 8/19, 37 yards, 0 TD
- Dayton – Bruce Jones: 7/12, 84 yards, 4 TD

Rushing

- Indianapolis – DeMarcus Simons: 11 att, 28 yards, 1 TD
- Dayton – Ronald Russell: 6 att, 39 yards, 2 TD

Receiving

- Indianapolis – Montez Williams: 1 rec, 20 yards, 0 TD
- Dayton – Daniel Stover: 2 rec, 31 yards, 1 TD

=== Week 12: vs Chicago Knights ===
Week 12: Chicago Knights at Dayton Silverbacks – Game summary

Quarter	1	2	3	4	Total
Knights	0	12	0	8	20
Silverbacks	10	13	0	14	37

at Hara Arena, Trotwood, Ohio

- Date: May 13
- Game time: 7:30 p.m. EDT
- Referee: Les Anderson

Game information

1st quarter

- Dayton – (11:08) Jeff Hubbard 32-yard field goal, Dayton 3–0
- Dayton – (7:14) Mychel Davis 5-yard blocked field goal return (Jeff Hubbard kick), Dayton 10–0

2nd quarter

- Chicago - (14:52) Willie Tolon 13-yard pass from Brandon Jewett (Julie Harshbarger kick failed), Dayton 10-6
- Chicago - (13:03) Martel Taylor 47-yard interception return (Julie Harshbarger kick failed), Chicago 12-6
- Dayton - (1:42) Daniel Stover 36-yard pass from Bruce Jones (Jeff Hubbard kick blocked), Dayton 16-12
- Dayton – (0:33) Mychel Davis 27-yard fumble recovery (Jeff Hubbard kick), Dayton 23–12

3rd quarter
4th quarter

- Dayton – (12:03) Melvin Bryant 8-yard pass from Bruce Jones(Jeff Hubbard kick), Dayton 30–12
- Chicago – (7:15) Team Safety, Dayton 30–14
- Chicago - (5:54) Brandon Jewett 1-yard rush (Brandon Jewett rush failed), Dayton 30-20
- Dayton - (0:22) Viterio Jones 47-yard interception return (Jeff Hubbard kick), Dayton 37-20

Passing

- Chicago – Brandon Jewett: 12/33, 115 yards, 1 TD
- Dayton – Bruce Jones: 5/12, 71 yards, 2 TD

Rushing

- Chicago – Brandon Jewett: 9 att, 26 yards, 1 TD
- Dayton – Ronald Russell: 6 att, 9 yards, 0 TD

Receiving

- Chicago – Willie Tolon: 10 rec, 111 yards, 1 TD
- Dayton – Daniel Stover: 4 rec, 63 yards, 1 TD

=== Week 14: vs Port Huron Predators ===
Week 14: Port Huron Predators at Dayton Silverbacks – Game summary

Quarter	1	2	3	4	Total
Predators	0	0	0	0	0
Silverbacks	2	0	0	0	2

at Hara Arena, Dayton, Ohio

- Date: May
- Game time: 7:30 p.m. EDT

Game information
Port Huron Forfeit

== Playoffs ==
=== 2 vs 3 Semifinal Game: vs Marion Blue Racers ===
2 vs 3 Semifinal Game: Dayton Silverbacks at Marion Blue Racers – Game summary

Quarter	1	2	3	4	Total
Silverbacks	0	0	6	12	18
Blue Racers	9	7	14	23	53

at Veterans Memorial Coliseum, Marion, Ohio

- Date: June 6
- Game time: 7:35 p.m. EDT
- Game attendance: 1,300
- Referee: Rick Jackson

Game information

1st quarter

- Marion – (1:49) Bishop Mills safety, Marion 2–0
- Marion - (0:54) Christen Haywood 2-yard rush (Tyler Lorenz kick), Marion 9-0

2nd quarter

- Marion - (4:49) Christen Haywood 2-yard rush (Tyler Lorenz kick), Marion 16-0

3rd quarter

- Marion - (9:26) Mike Tatum 1-yard rush (Tyler Lorenz kick), Marion 23-0
- Marion - (3:13) Josh Harris 5-yard rush (Tyler Lorenz kick), Marion 30-0
- Dayton - (0:22) Daniel Stover 10-yard pass from Jarvis Taylor (Jarvis Taylor pass failed), Marion 30-6

4th quarter

- Marion - (10:41) Marc Huddelston 17-yard pass from Josh Harris (Tyler Lorenz kick), Marion 37-6
- Dayton - (5:31) Ronald Russell 1-yard rush (Jarvis Taylor rush failed), Marion 37-12
- Marion - (1:14) LaMarr Stewart 0-yard fumble recovery (Tyler Lorenz kick), Marion 44-12
- Dayton - (0:49) Daniel Stover 5-yard pass from Jarvis Taylor (Victor Jett rush failed), Marion 44-18
- Marion – (0:22) Brandon Williams 6-yard pass from Josh Harris (Tyler Lorenz kick), Marion 51–18
- Marion – (0:07) Jared Dorn safety, Marion 53–18

Passing

- Dayton – Jarvis Taylor: 7/17, 62 yards, 2 TD
- Marion – Josh Harris: 5/11, 48 yards, 2 TD

Rushing

- Dayton – Jarvis Taylor: 12 att, 20 yards, 0 TD
- Marion – Mike Tatum: 5 att, 21 yards, 1 TD

Receiving

- Dayton – Daniel Stover: 4 rec, 32 yards, 2 TD
- Marion – Mike Tatum: 2 rec, 29 yards, 0 TD
