= 2011 Chicago Knights season =

CIFL season

- Head coach: John Burns
- Home stadium: Victory Sports Complex; 7003 North Alpine; Loves Park, IL 61111

Results
- Record: 4-6
- League place: 4th
- Playoffs: Lost Semifinals 13-71 (Commandos)

The 2011 Chicago Knights season is the fourth season for the Continental Indoor Football League (CIFL) franchise, and the 1st as the franchise's name change to the Knights.

== Standings ==
2011 Continental Indoor Football League
Team	W	L	T	PCT	PF	PA	PF (Avg.)	PA (Avg.)	STK
Cincinnati Commandos-y	10	0	0	1.000	484	158	53.77	17.55	W10
Marion Blue Racers-x	8	2	0	.800	455	218	45.5	21.8	L1
Dayton Silverbacks-x	5	5	0	.500	288	265	32	39.4	W3
Chicago Knights-x	4	6	0	.400	255	295	28.33	32.77	L5
Port Huron Predators	2	8	0	.200	238	226	39.6	37.6	L7
Indianapolis Enforcers	1	9	0	.100	71	621	7.88	69	L3

== Final roster ==
2011 Chicago Knights roster
Quarterbacks: 8 Brandon Jewett; 13 Ron Ricciardi; Running backs: 22 Darnell King; 24 Michael Hayden; Wide receivers: 12 Rafu Armour; 45 Shawn McKeown; 1 Willie Tolon	Offensive linemen: 94 Lawrence Ancahas; 88 Daryl McNeil; 93 Evan Page; Defensive linemen: 14 Gemayel Cowser; 26 Jeremy Robinson	Linebackers: 18 Zontavius Johnson; 6 Zac Pederson; Defensive backs: 21 Harvey Allen; 5 Mike Keeton; 24 Ryan Robinson; 27 Martel Taylor; Kickers: 3 Julie Harshbarger	Inactive: 6 Shonn Bell DL; -- Mike Brockman OL/DL; -- Dino Cardone DB; -- Foster Chambers RB; 88 Simon Chandler OL; -- Tyler Honeck LB; 12 Rick Lahrman WR; -- Justin Miles WR; -- Jason Mitchell OL/DL; -- Alex Nunez QB; -- Mathew Odigie DB; 90 Jeremy Shedrick DL; 26 Tony Smidl K; -- Ricky Soto OL/DL; -- Brian Tait WR; 87 Neal Wilcox WR; 2 Brandon Wogoman WR; Injured reserve Updated April 26, 2011 rookies in italics 19 Active, 17 Inactive

== Schedule ==
Week	Date	Opponent	Home/Away	Result
1		Bye	Week	
2	March 5	Cincinnati Commandos	Away	Lost 7-53
3		Bye	Week	
4		Bye	Week	
5		Bye	Week	
6	April 2	Port Huron Predators	Away	Won 45-29
7	April 8	Indianapolis Enforcers	Away	Won 42-14
8	April 17	Indianapolis Enforcers	Home	Won 52-6
9	April 23	Dayton Silverbacks	Home	Lost 21-24
10	April 30	Marion Blue Racers	Away	Lost 3-31
11	May 8	Cincinnati Commandos	Home	Lost 41-48
12	May 13	Dayton Silverbacks	Away	Lost 20-37
13	May 21	Marion Blue Racers	Home	Lost 24-53
14		Bye	Week	
15	June 4	Port Huron Predators	Home	Won 2-0 (Forfeit)

== Playoff schedule ==
Week	Date	Opponent	Home/Away	Result
Semifinals	June 3	Cincinnati Commandos	Away	Lost 13-71

== Stats ==
=== Passing ===
Player	Comp.	Att.	Comp%	Yards	TD's	INT's	Rating
Brandon Jewett	61	131	46.6%	606	11	6	93.0
Ron Ricciardi	40	80	50%	356	6	5	95.8
Brandon Wogoman	1	2	50%	8	1	0	135.4

=== Rushing ===
Player	Car.	Yards	Avg.	TD's	Long
James Chicon	21	75	3.6	3	17
Michael Hayden	16	60	3.8	0	17
Mike Williams	9	47	5.2	2	12
Brandon Jewett	18	43	2.4	1	14
Brandon Wogoman	13	29	2.2	2	11

=== Receiving ===
Player	Rec.	Yards	Avg.	TD's	Long
Willie Tolon	38	340	8.9	5	34
Brandon Wogoman	16	192	12.0	3	38
Zontavious Johnson	12	139	11.6	5	27
Shawn McKeown	12	69	5.8	1	13

== Regular season ==
=== Week 2: vs Cincinnati Commandos ===
Week 2: Chicago Knights at Cincinnati Commandos – Game summary

Quarter	1	2	3	4	Total
Knights	0	7	0	0	7
Commandos	13	14	6	20	53

at Cincinnati Gardens, Cincinnati, Ohio

- Date: March 5
- Game time: 7:30 p.m. EDT
- Game attendance: 2,643

Game information

1st quarter

- Cincinnati – (12:02) George Murray 14-yard pass from Tyler Sheehan (Brandon Yingling kick), Cincinnati 7–0
- Cincinnati - (8:40) Greg Moore 1-yard rush (Brandon Yingling kick failed), Cincinnati 13-0

2nd quarter

- Cincinnati - (14:50) George Murray 27-yard pass from Tyler Sheehan (George Murray pass from Tyler Sheehan), Cincinnati 21-0
- Chicago - (4:07) Rick Lahrman 23-yard pass from Ron Ricciardi (Tony Smidl kick), Cincinnati 21-7
- Cincinnati - (0:16) Tyler Sheehan 1-yard rush (Brandon Yingling kick failed), Cincinnati 27-7

3rd quarter

- Cincinnati - (2:52) Brandon Boehm 21-yard pass from Ben Mauk (Brandon Boehm pass failed), Cincinnati 33-7

4th quarter

- Cincinnati - (11:05) Kyenes Mincy 13-yard pass from Ben Mauk (Ben Mauk pass failed), Cincinnati 39-7
- Cincinnati - (5:35) Moe Lee 5-yard pass from Ben Mauk (David Wess rush), Cincinnati 47-7
- Cincinnati - (0:50) Kyenes Mincy 1-yard pass from Ben Mauk (Brandon Yingling kick failed), Cincinnati 53-7

Passing

- Chicago – Ron Ricciardi: 5/13, 43 yards, 1 TD
- Cincinnati – Tyler Sheehan: 11/20, 135 yards, 2 TD

Rushing

- Chicago – Ryan Robinson: 10 att, 20 yards, 0 TD
- Cincinnati – Greg Moore: 9 att, 24 yards, 1 TD

Receiving

- Chicago – Rick Lahrman: 2 rec, 29 yards, 1 TD
- Cincinnati – Kyenes Mincy: 6 rec, 64 yards, 2 TD

=== Week 6: vs Port Huron Predators ===
Week 6: Chicago Knights at Port Huron Predators – Game summary

Quarter	1	2	3	4	Total
Knights	7	9	16	13	45
Predators	7	7	8	7	29

at McMorran Arena, Port Huron, Michigan

- Date: April 2
- Game time: 7:30 p.m. EDT
- Game attendance: 1,519
- Referee: Dave Stein

Game information

1st quarter

- Port huron – (3:44) Terry Mitchell 0-yard fumble recovery (Chris Tatti kick), Port Huron 7–0
- Chicago - (0:55) James Chicon 8-yard rush (Julie Harshbarger kick), 7-7

2nd quarter

- Port huron – (13:04) Devon Daniels 14-yard pass from Jim Roth (Chris Tatti kick), Port Huron 14–7
- Chicago - (0:46) Brandon Wogoman 44-yard missed field goal return (Julie Harshbarger kick failed), Port Huron 14-13
- Chicago - (0:01) Julie Harshbarger 26-yard field goal, Chicago 16-14

3rd quarter

- Port huron – (11:13) Jim Roth 11-yard rush (Adam Hurst rush), Port Huron 22–16
- Chicago - (9:07) Zontavius Johnson 23-yard pass from Ron Ricciardi (Julie Harshbarger kick), Chicago 23-22
- Chicago - (7:16) Tyler Damien safety, Chicago 25-22
- Chicago - (1:31) Ty Meyers 8-yard pass from Brandon Wogoman (Julie Harshbarger kick), Chicago 32-22

4th quarter

- Chicago - (7:56) James Chicon 2-yard rush (Julie Harshbarger kick), Chicago 39-22
- Port huron – (4:05) Terry Mitchell 4-yard pass from Jim Roth (Chris Tatti kick), Chicago 39–29
- Chicago - (0:57) Brandon Wogoman 8-yard rush (Brandon Wogoman rush failed), Chicago 45-29

Passing

- Chicago – Ron Ricciardi: 10/17, 111 yards, 1 TD
- Port huron – Jim Roth: 10/23, 94 yards, 2 TD

Rushing

- Chicago – Mike Hayden: 9 att, 36 yards, 0 TD
- Port huron – Adam Hurst: 3 att, 25 yards, 0 TD

Receiving

- Chicago – Willie Tolon: 3 rec, 14 yards, 0 TD
- Port huron – Terry Mitchell: 3 rec, 46 yards, 1 TD

=== Week 7: vs Indianapolis Enforcers ===
Week 7: Chicago Knights at Indianapolis Enforcers – Game summary

Quarter	1	2	3	4	Total
Knights	7	14	14	7	42
Enforcers	0	12	0	2	14

at 10th Street Sports Center, Indianapolis, Indiana

- Date: April 9
- Game time: 7:30 p.m. EDT

Game information

1st quarter

- Chicago - (9:00) Harvery Allen 42-yard interception return (Julie Harshbarger kick), Chicago 7-0

2nd quarter

- Chicago - (3:35) Willie Tolon 7-yard pass from Ron Ricciardi (Julie Harshbarger kick), Chicago 14-0
- Indianapolis - (0:41) Ricky Emery 8-yard pass from DeMarcus Simons (Ian Pocurro kick failed), Chicago 14-6
- Chicago - (0:15) Willie Tolon 1-yard rush (Julie Harshbarger kick), Chicago 21-6
- Indianapolis - (0:03) Troy Summers 32-yard pass from DeMarcus Simons (DeMarcus Simons rush failed), Chicago 21-12

3rd quarter

- Chicago - (6:35) Ron Ricciardi 2-yard rush (Julie Harsbharger kick), Chicago 28-12
- Chicago - (0:00) Willie Tolon 13-yard pass from Ron Ricciardi (Julie Harshbarger kick), Chicago 35-12

4th quarter

- Chicago - (5:30) Brandon Wogoman 1-yard rush (Julie Harshbarger kick), Marion 42-12
- Indianapolis - (0:00) Joel Fravel safety, Chicago 42-14

Passing

- Chicago – Ron Ricciardi: 12/16, 112 yards, 2 TD
- Indianapolis – DeMarcus Simons: 11/24, 130 yards, 2 TD

Rushing

- Chicago – James Chicon: 7 att, 34 yards, 0 TD
- Indianapolis – Ricky Emery: 8 att, 29 yards, 0 TD

Receiving

- Chicago – Willie Tolon: 5 rec, 49 yards, 2 TD
- Indianapolis – Troy Summers: 3 rec, 47 yards, 1 TD

=== Week 8: vs Indianapolis Enforcers ===
Week 8: Indianapolis Enforcers at Chicago Knights – Game summary

Quarter	1	2	3	4	Total
Enforcers	0	6	0	0	6
Knights	6	23	9	14	52

at Victory Sports Complex, Loves Park, Illinois

- Date: April 17
- Game time: 2:30 p.m. CDT
- Game attendance: 170
- Referee: Tommy Tyks

Game information

1st quarter

- Chicago - (11:45) Mike Williams 2-yard rush (Julie Harshbarger kick failed), Chicago 6-0

2nd quarter

- Chicago - (14:52) Julie Harshbarger 23-yard field goal, Chicago 9-0
- Chicago - (10:04) J Openga 14-yard pass from Ron Ricciardi (Julie Harshbarger kick), Chicago 16-0
- Chicago - (10:04) Team Rouge, Chicago 17-0
- Chicago - (6:01) Julie Harshbarger 20-yard field goal, Chicago 20-0
- Indianapolis - (1:59) DeMarcus Simons 1-yard rush (DeMarcus Simons pass failed), Chicago 20-6
- Chicago - (0:24) James Chicon 1-yard rush (Zac Peterson rush failed), Chicago 26-6
- Chicago - (0:00) Julie Harshbarger 17-yard field goal, Chicago 29-6

3rd quarter

- Chicago - (6:24) Zontavius Johnson 12-yard pass from Ron Ricciardi (Julie Harshbarger kick), Chicago 36-6
- Chicago - (3:32) Team Safety, Chicago 38-6

4th quarter

- Chicago - (6:18) J Openga 38-yard pass from Brandon Jewett (Julie Harshbarger kick), Chicago 45-6
- Chicago - (0:12) Mike Williams 11-yard rush (Julie Harshbarger kick failed), Chicago 52-6

Passing

- Indianapolis – DeMarcus Simons: 7/22, 43 yards, 0 TD
- Chicago – Ron Ricciardi: 8/18, 82 yards, 2 TD

Rushing

- Indianapolis – DeMarcus Simons: 9 att, 19 yards, 1 TD
- Chicago – Mike Williams: 9 att, 47 yards, 2 TD

Receiving

- Indianapolis – Karl Jones: 4 rec, 34 yards, 0 TD
- Chicago – Zontavius Johnson: 4 rec, 36 yards, 1 TD

=== Week 9: vs Dayton Silverbacks ===
Week 9: Dayton Silverbacks at Chicago Knights – Game summary

Quarter	1	2	3	4	Total
Silverbacks	7	14	3	0	24
Knights	11	3	7	0	21

at Victory Sports Complex, Loves Park, Illinois

- Date: April 22
- Game time: 7:30 p.m. CDT
- Game attendance: 210
- Referee: Tommy Tyks

Game information

1st quarter

- Chicago – (15:00) Shawn McKeown rouge, Chicago 1–0
- Chicago – (11:55) Gemayel Cowseer 12-yard interception return (Julie Harshbarger kick), 8–0
- Chicago – (6:41) Julie Harshbarger 23-yard field goal, Chicago 11-0
- Dayton – (4:44) Ronald Russell 2-yard rush (Jeff Hubbard kick), Chicago 11–7

2nd quarter

- Chicago – (14:16) Julie Harshbarger 25-yard field goal, Chicago 14-7
- Dayton – (0:44) Ronald Russell 5-yard rush (Jeff Hubbard kick), 14–14
- Dayton – (00:26) Viterio Jones 30-yard interception return (Jeff Hubbard kick), 21–14

3rd quarter

- Dayton – (7:35) Jeff Hubbard 25-yard field goal, Dayton 24-14
- Chicago - (2:18) Brandon Wogoman 9-yard pass from Brandon Jewett (Julie Harshbarger kick), Dayton 24-21

4th quarter

Passing

- Dayton – Jeremy Greenleaf: 6/17, 104 yards, 0 TD
- Chicago – Brandon Jewett: 4/10, 30 yards, 1 TD

Rushing

- Dayton – Victor Tolbert: 8 att, 24 yards, 0 TD
- Chicago – Dante Washington: 4 att, 6 yards, 0 TD

Receiving

- Dayton – Melvin Bryant: 3 rec, 70 yards, 0 TD
- Chicago – Willie Tolon: 4 rec, 17 yards, 0 TD

=== Week 10: vs Marion Blue Racers ===
Week 10: Chicago Knights at Marion Blue Racers – Game summary

Quarter	1	2	3	4	Total
Knights	3	0	0	0	3
Blue Racers	0	9	9	13	31

at Veterans Memorial Coliseum, Marion, Ohio

- Date: April 30
- Game time: 7:30 p.m. EDT
- Game attendance: 1,100
- Referee: Dave Stein

Game information

1st quarter

- Chicago – (10:40) Julie Harshbarger 28-yard field goal, Chicago 3-0

2nd quarter

- Marion - (14:45) Mike Tatum 6-yard pass from Josh Harris (Tyler Lorenz kick), Marion 7-3
- Marion – (0:00) Team Safety, Marion 9–3

3rd quarter

- Marion – (11:45) Team Safety, Marion 11–3
- Marion - (8:15) Mike Tatum 6-yard pass from Josh Harris (Tyler Lorenz kick), Marion 18-3

4th quarter

- Marion – (8:08) Marc Huddleston 5-yard rush (Tyler Lorenz kick), Marion 25–3
- Marion – (1:00) Christen Haywood 2-yard rush (Tyler Lorenz kick failed), Marion 31–3

Passing

- Chicago – Brandon Jewett: 13/27, 82 yards, 0 TD
- Marion – Josh Harris: 8/15, 67 yards, 2 TD

Rushing

- Chicago – Brandon Wogoman: 2 att, 7 yards, 0 TD
- Marion – Christen Haywood: 6 att, 44 yards, 1 TD

Receiving

- Chicago – Brandon Wogoman: 5 rec, 43 yards, 0 TD
- Marion – Christen Haywood: 2 rec, 20 yards, 0 TD

=== Week 11: vs Cincinnati Commandos ===
Week 11: Cincinnati Commandos at Chicago Knights – Game summary

Quarter	1	2	3	4	Total
Commandos	14	7	0	27	48
Knights	6	13	6	16	41

at Victory Sports Complex, Loves Park, Illinois

- Date: May 8
- Game time: 7:30 p.m. CDT
- Referee: Jim Bernardi

Game information

1st quarter

- Cincinnati – (10:04) Derrick Moss 3-yard rush (Brandon Yingling kick), Cincinnati 7–0
- Cincinnati - (5:51) Phillip Barnett 3-yard pass from George Murray (Brandon Yingling kick), Cincinnati 14-0
- Chicago - (4:10) Zontavious Johnson 12-yard pass from Brandon Jewett (Julie Harshbarger kick failed), Cincinnati 14-6

2nd quarter

- Chicago - (7:35) Brandon Wogoman 19-yard pass from Brandon Jewett (James Cichon rush failed), Cincinnati 14-12
- Cincinnati – (5:36) Derrick Moss 16-yard rush (Brandon Yingling kick), Cincinnati 21–12
- Chicago - (1:12) Shawn McKeown 1-yard rush (Julie Harshbarger kick), Cincinnati 21-19

3rd quarter

- Chicago - (8:55) Willie Tolon 8-yard pass from Brandon Jewett (James Cichon rush failed), Chicago 25-21

4th quarter

- Cincinnati – (13:17) Derrick Moss 1-yard rush (George Murray pass failed), Cincinnati 27–25
- Chicago - (7:55) Julie Harshbarger 20-yard field goal, Chicago 28-27
- Chicago - (5:42) Brandon Wogoman 38-yard pass from Brandon Jewett (Brandon Jewett pass failed), Chicago 34-27
- Cincinnati - (3:18) Brandon Boehm 15-yard pass from George Murray (Brandon Yingling kick), 34-34
- Chicago - (1:53) Zontavious Johnson 27-yard pass from Brandon Jewett (Julie Harshbarger kick), Chicago 41-34
- Cincinnati - (0:31) Greg Moore 19-yard pass from George Murray (Brandon Yingling kick failed), Chicago 41-40
- Cincinnati - (0:05) Kyenes Mincy 15-yard pass from George Murray (Greg Moore rush), Cincinnati 48-41

Passing

- Cincinnati – George Murray: 10/27, 110 yards, 4 TD
- Chicago – Brandon Jewett: 13/21, 183 yards, 5 TD

Rushing

- Cincinnati – Derrick Moss: 10 att, 32 yards, 3 TD
- Chicago – Brandon Jewett: 4 att, 14 yards, 0 TD

Receiving

- Cincinnati – Brandon Boeh,: 3 rec, 40 yards, 1 TD
- Chicago – Brandon Wogoman: 4 rec, 91 yards, 2 TD

=== Week 12: vs Dayton Silverbacks ===
Week 12: Chicago Knights at Dayton Silverbacks – Game summary

Quarter	1	2	3	4	Total
Knights	0	12	0	8	20
Silverbacks	10	13	0	14	37

at Hara Arena, Trotwood, Ohio

- Date: May 13
- Game time: 7:30 p.m. EDT
- Referee: Les Anderson

Game information

1st quarter

- Dayton – (11:08) Jeff Hubbard 32-yard field goal, Dayton 3–0
- Dayton – (7:14) Mychel Davis 5-yard blocked field goal return (Jeff Hubbard kick), Dayton 10–0

2nd quarter

- Chicago - (14:52) Willie Tolon 13-yard pass from Brandon Jewett (Julie Harshbarger kick failed), Dayton 10-6
- Chicago - (13:03) Martel Taylor 47-yard interception return (Julie Harshbarger kick failed), Chicago 12-6
- Dayton - (1:42) Daniel Stover 36-yard pass from Bruce Jones (Jeff Hubbard kick blocked), Dayton 16-12
- Dayton – (0:33) Mychel Davis 27-yard fumble recovery (Jeff Hubbard kick), Dayton 23–12

3rd quarter
4th quarter

- Dayton – (12:03) Melvin Bryant 8-yard pass from Bruce Jones(Jeff Hubbard kick), Dayton 30–12
- Chicago – (7:15) Team Safety, Dayton 30–14
- Chicago - (5:54) Brandon Jewett 1-yard rush (Brandon Jewett rush failed), Dayton 30-20
- Dayton - (0:22) Viterio Jones 47-yard interception return (Jeff Hubbard kick), Dayton 37-20

Passing

- Chicago – Brandon Jewett: 12/33, 115 yards, 1 TD
- Dayton – Bruce Jones: 5/12, 71 yards, 2 TD

Rushing

- Chicago – Brandon Jewett: 9 att, 26 yards, 1 TD
- Dayton – Ronald Russell: 6 att, 9 yards, 0 TD

Receiving

- Chicago – Willie Tolon: 10 rec, 111 yards, 1 TD
- Dayton – Daniel Stover: 4 rec, 63 yards, 1 TD

=== Week 13: vs Marion Blue Racers ===
Week 13: Marion Blue Racers at Chicago Knights – Game summary

Quarter	1	2	3	4	Total
Blue Racers	13	10	14	16	53
Knights	6	0	6	12	24

at Victory Sports Complex, Loves Park, Illinois

- Date: May 22
- Game time: 7:30 p.m. CDT
- Game attendance: 75
- Referee: Jim Bernardi

Game information

1st quarter

- Chicago - (9:07) Willie Tolon 28-yard pass from Brandon Jewett (Julie Harshbarger kick failed), Chicago 6-0
- Marion - (4:34) Robert Price 2-yard rush (Tyler Lorenz kick blocked), 6-6
- Marion - (0:00) Mark Huddleston 8-yard pass from Mike Tatum (Tyler Lorenz kick), Marion 13-6

2nd quarter

- Marion - (5:39) Josh Harris 1-yard rush (Tyler Lorenz kick), Marion 20-6
- Marion - (0:00) Tyler Lorenz 24-yard field goal, Marion 23-6

3rd quarter

- Marion - (14:18) Brandon Williams 25-yard pass form Josh Harris (Tyler Lorenz kick), Marion 30-6
- Marion - (2:40) Josh Harris 6-yard rush (Tyler Lorenz kick), Marion 37-6
- Chicago - (1:07) Zontavius Johnson 15-yard pass from Brandon Jewett (Willie Tolon pass failed), Marion 37-12

4th quarter

- Marion - (12:33) Josh Harris 3-yard rush (Tyler Lorenz kick), Marion 44-12
- Chicago - (9:12) Dante Washington 4-yard rush (Brandon Jewett pass intercepted), Marion 44-18
- Marion - (9:12) J Dorn returned PAT, Marion 46-18
- Marion - (6:43) Bishop Hills 8-yard pass from Marc Huddelston (Tyler Lorenz kick), Marion 53-18
- Chicago - (4:02) Shawn McKeown 13-yard pass from Brandon Jewett (Brandon Jewett pass failed), Marion 53-24

Passing

- Marion – Josh Harris: 3/7, 43 yards, 1 TD
- Chicago – Brandon Jewett: 15/30, 135 yards, 3 TD

Rushing

- Marion – Josh Harris: 5 att, 21 yards, 3 TD
- Chicago – Dante Washington: 3 att, 8 yards, 1 TD

Receiving

- Marion – Christen Haywood: 2 rec, 36 yards, 0 TD
- Chicago – Neil Wilcox: 5 rec, 32 yards, 0 TD

=== Week 15: vs Port Huron Predators ===
Week 15: Port Huron Predators at Chicago Knights – Game summary

Quarter	1	2	3	4	Total
Predators	0	0	0	0	0
Knights	2	0	0	0	2

at Victory Sports Complex, Loves Park, Illinois

- Date: June 4
- Game time: 7:30 p.m. CDT

Game information
Port Huron Forfeit

== Playoffs ==
=== 2011 1 vs 4 Semifinal Game vs. Cincinnati Commandos ===
2011 1 vs 4 Semifinal Game: Chicago Knights at Cincinnati Commandos – Game summary

Quarter	1	2	3	4	Total
Knights	0	13	0	0	13
Commandos	20	28	7	16	71

at Cincinnati Gardens, Cincinnati, Ohio

- Date: June 3
- Game time: 8:05 p.m. EDT
- Referee: Les Anderson

Game information

1st quarter

- Cincinnati - (13:17) Derrick Moss 14-yard pass from Tyler Sheehan (Brandon Yingling kick), Cincinnati 7-0
- Cincinnati - (8:23) Kyenes Mincy 9-yard pass from Tyler Sheehan (Brandon Yingling kick blocked), Cincinnati 13-0
- Cincinnati - (2:00) Derrick Moss 1-yard rush, (Brandon Yingling kick), Cincinnati 20-0

2nd quarter

- Chicago - (14:52) Willie Tolon 9-yard pass from Brandon Jewett, (Julie Harshbarger kick), Cincinnati 20-7
- Cincinnati - (12:53) Kyenes Mincy 23-yard pass from Tyler Sheehan (Shawn McGarity pass failed), Cincinnati 26-7
- Chicago - (11:15) Shawn McKeown 39-yard pass from Brandon Jewett, (Julie Harshbarger kick blocked), Cincinnati 26-13
- Cincinnati - (11:15) Fabian Connor PAT return, Cincinnati 28-13
- Cincinnati - (9:16) Phillip Barnett 27-yard pass from Tyler Sheehan (Brandon Yingling kick failed), Cincinnati 34-13
- Cincinnati - (5:38) Shawn McGarity 11-yard pass from Tyler Sheehan (Greg Moore rush), Cincinnati 42-13
- Cincinnati - (1:27) Derrick Moss 14-yard pass from Tyler Sheehan (Brandon Yingling kick failed), Cincinnati 48-13

3rd quarter

- Cincinnati - (10:56) Kyenes Mincy 2-yard pass from Tyler Sheehan (Brandon Yingling kick), Cincinnati 55-13

4th quarter

- Cincinnati - (12:21) Brandon Boehm 13-yard pass from Tyler Sheehan (Brandon Yingling kick failed), Cincinnati 61-13
- Cincinnati - (8:08) Phillip Barnett 20-yard pass from Tyler Sheehan (Brandon Yingling kick), Cincinnati 68-13
- Cincinnati - (1:16) Brandon Yingling 32-yard field goal, Cincinnati 71-13

Passing

- Chicago – Brandon Jewett: 12/28, 137 yards, 2 TD
- Cincinnati – Tyler Sheehan: 17/27, 194 yards, 9 TD

Rushing

- Chicago – Mike Keeton: 1 att, 2 yards, 0 TD
- Cincinnati – Derrick Moss: 8 att, 36 yards, 1 TD

Receiving

- Chicago – Shawn McGarity: 5 rec, 99 yards, 1 TD
- Cincinnati – Phillip Barnett: 6 rec, 89 yards, 2 TD
