= 2011 Cincinnati Commandos season =

- Owner: Dennis Whitman; Paul Napier
- Head coach: Billy Back
- Home stadium: Cincinnati Gardens; 2250 Seymour Avenue; Cincinnati, OH 45212

Results
- Record: 10-0
- League place: 1st
- Playoffs: Won Semifinals 71-13 (Knights); Won CIFL Championship Game 44-29 (Blue Racers)

The 2011 Cincinnati Commandos season was the 2nd season for the Continental Indoor Football League (CIFL) franchise.

Head Coach Billy Back returned for the 2011 season, and Brian Wells, former head coach of the Miami Valley Silverbacks, was hired as Defensive Coordinator. For 2011 the Commandos announced the signing of: Tyler Sheehan (QB), Derrick Crawford (Defensive Line), Maurice Lee (WR), Corey Clarke (WR), Brandon Harrison (WR), and Peter Warrick (WR)

== Standings ==
2011 Continental Indoor Football League
Team	W	L	T	PCT	PF	PA	PF (Avg.)	PA (Avg.)	STK
Cincinnati Commandos-y	10	0	0	1.000	484	158	53.77	17.55	W10
Marion Blue Racers-x	8	2	0	.800	455	218	45.5	21.8	L1
Dayton Silverbacks-x	5	5	0	.500	288	265	32	39.4	W3
Chicago Knights-x	4	6	0	.400	255	295	28.33	32.77	L5
Port Huron Predators	2	8	0	.200	238	226	39.6	37.6	L7
Indianapolis Enforcers	1	9	0	.100	71	621	7.88	69	L3

== Roster ==
2011 Cincinnati Commandos roster
Quarterbacks: 13 Tyler Sheehan; Offensive backs: 2 Greg Moore; 23 Derrick Moss; Receivers: 9 Phillip Barnett; 12 Brandon Boehm; 8 Maurice Lee; 5 Shawn McGarity; 3 Kyenes Mincy; 15 George Murray	Offensive linemen: 82 Richard Bailey; 89 Javon Potter; 88 Frank Straub; 80 Derek Weaver; Defensive linemen: 55 Thomas Claggett; 95 Terrill Byrd; 11 James Frazier; 99 Pernell Phillips	Linebackers: 37 Wendell Brown; 10 Torry Cornett; Defensive backs: 4 Fabian Conner; 17 Mike Crawford; 21 Jeff Franklin; 41 Marcus Spencer; Kickers: 18 Brandon Yingling	Inactive: 7 Kieth Asom DB; 22 Keith Brooks RB; 79 Richard Deutch OL; 27 Corey Stewart DB; 33 Andy Stuckert FB; 6 Robbie Wilson DB; Injured reserve: currently vacant; Updated 2011-05-28 rookies in italics 25 Active, 6 Inactive

== Schedule ==
Week	Date	Opponent	Home/Away	Result
1		Bye	Week	
2	March 5	Chicago Knights	Home	W, 53-7
3	March 12	Marion Blue Racers	Away	W, 50-44
4	March 19	Indianapolis Enforcers	Home	W, 82-2
5		Bye	Week	
6	April 2	Dayton Silverbacks	Away	W, 32-15
7	April 8	Port Huron Predators	Home	W, 47-22
8		Bye	Week	
9		Bye	Week	
10	April 29	Dayton Silverbacks	Home	W, 41-7
11	May 8	Chicago Knights	Away	W, 48-41
12	May 14	Port Huron Predators	Away	W, 2-0 (Forfeit)
13	May 21	Indianapolis Enforcers	Home	W, 81-0
14	May 28	Marion Blue Racers	Home	W, 50-20
15		Bye	Week	

== Playoff Schedule ==
Week	Date	Opponent	Home/Away	Result
CIFL Semifinals	June 3	Chicago Knights	Home	Won 71-13
CIFL Championship Game	June 11	Marion Blue Racers	Home	Won 44-29

== Regular season ==
=== Week 2: vs Chicago Knights ===
Week 2: Chicago Knights at Cincinnati Commandos – Game summary

Quarter	1	2	3	4	Total
Knights	0	7	0	0	7
Commandos	13	14	6	20	53

at Cincinnati Gardens, Cincinnati, Ohio

- Date: March 5
- Game time: 7:30 p.m. EDT
- Game attendance: 2,643

Game information

1st quarter

- Cincinnati – (12:02) George Murray 14-yard pass from Tyler Sheehan (Brandon Yingling kick), Cincinnati 7–0
- Cincinnati - (8:40) Greg Moore 1-yard rush (Brandon Yingling kick failed), Cincinnati 13-0

2nd quarter

- Cincinnati - (14:50) George Murray 27-yard pass from Tyler Sheehan (George Murray pass from Tyler Sheehan), Cincinnati 21-0
- Chicago - (4:07) Rick Lahrman 23-yard pass from Ron Ricciardi (Tony Smidl kick), Cincinnati 21-7
- Cincinnati - (0:16) Tyler Sheehan 1-yard rush (Brandon Yingling kick failed), Cincinnati 27-7

3rd quarter

- Cincinnati - (2:52) Brandon Boehm 21-yard pass from Ben Mauk (Brandon Boehm pass failed), Cincinnati 33-7

4th quarter

- Cincinnati - (11:05) Kyenes Mincy 13-yard pass from Ben Mauk (Ben Mauk pass failed), Cincinnati 39-7
- Cincinnati - (5:35) Moe Lee 5-yard pass from Ben Mauk (David Wess rush), Cincinnati 47-7
- Cincinnati - (0:50) Kyenes Mincy 1-yard pass from Ben Mauk (Brandon Yingling kick failed), Cincinnati 53-7

Passing

- Chicago – Ron Ricciardi: 5/13, 43 yards, 1 TD
- Cincinnati – Tyler Sheehan: 11/20, 135 yards, 2 TD

Rushing

- Chicago – Ryan Robinson: 10 att, 20 yards, 0 TD
- Cincinnati – Greg Moore: 9 att, 24 yards, 1 TD

Receiving

- Chicago – Rick Lahrman: 2 rec, 29 yards, 1 TD
- Cincinnati – Kyenes Mincy: 6 rec, 64 yards, 2 TD

Cincinnati opened up defense of its 2010 CIFL Championship with a convincing 53-7 victory over the Chicago Knights on March 5. Cincinnati unveiled its championship banner at The Gardens that same night and gave its fans a memorable evening. Cincinnati dominated the game from start to finish jumping out to 21-0 lead and 27-7 halftime lead. Cincinnati scored just once in the third quarter before adding three more scores in the final stanza. Cincinnati was led by two quarterbacks. Starting quarterback Tyler Sheehan was 11 of 20 for 135 yards and two touchdowns. Fellow quarterback and 2010 CIFL MVP Ben Mauk was nine of 15 for 102 yards and four touchdowns. The passing was spread around to seven receivers. The top receiver was Keynes Mincy with six receptions for 64 yards and two touchdowns. Other receivers include Brandon Boehm wo had three catches for 50 yards; George Murray had four receptions for 44 yards; and Greg Moore had two catches for 35 yards. The leading rusher was Greg Moore with 24 yards on nine carries.

=== Week 3: vs Marion Blue Racers ===
Week 3: Cincinnati Commandos at Marion Blue Racers – Game summary

Quarter	1	2	3	4	Total
Commandos	6	24	7	13	50
Blue Racers	6	14	11	13	44

at Veterans Memorial Coliseum, Marion, Ohio

- Date: March 12
- Game time: 7:30 p.m. EDT

Game information

1st quarter

- Marion - (11:34) Mike Tatum 14-yard pass from Josh Harris (Tyler Lorenz kick failed), Marion 6-0
- Cincinnati – (8:57) George Murray 12-yard pass from Tyler Sheehan (Justin McClain kick failed), 6–6

2nd quarter

- Cincinnati – (14:53) George Murray 3-yard pass from Tyler Sheehan (Justin McClain kick), Cincinnati 13–6
- Cincinnati - (10:33) Pernell Phillips safety, Cincinnati 15-6
- Cincinnati - (1:42) Greg Moore 4-yard rush (George Murray pass from Tyler Sheehan), Cincinnati 23-6
- Marion – (0:22) Josh Harris 1-yard rush (Tyler Lorenz kick blocked), Cincinnati 23–12
- Cincinnati - (0:02) George Murray 6-yard pass from Tyler Sheehan (Justin McClain kick), Cincinnati 30-12
- Marion – (0:00) Timothy Robinson 8-yard pass from Josh Harris (Josh Harris rush), Cincinnati 30–20

3rd quarter

- Cincinnati - (11:16) Jeff Franklin 0-yard blocked field goal return (Justin McClain kick), Cincinnati 37-20
- Marion – (10:58) Mike Tatum 44-yard kickoff return (Josh Harris rush), Cincinnati 37–28
- Marion – (3:43) Tyler Lorenz 20-yard field goal, Cincinnati 37-31

4th quarter

- Cincinnati - (13:56) Brandon Boehm 2-yard pass from Tyler Sheehan (Tyler Sheehan pass failed), Cincinnati 43-31
- Cincinnati - (12:09) Tyler Sheehan 3-yard rush (Justin McClain kick), Cincinnati 50-31
- Marion - (10:48) Mike Tatum 26-yard pass from Josh Harris (Tyler Lorenz kick), Cincinnati 50-38
- Marion - (0:51) Brandon Williams 9-yard pass from Josh Harris (Josh Harris pass failed), Cincinnati 50-44

Passing

- Cincinnati – Tyler Sheehan: 24/36, 237 yards, 4 TD
- Marion – Josh Harris: 12/22, 115 yards, 4 TD

Rushing

- Cincinnati – Greg Moore: 14 att, 55 yards, 1 TD
- Marion – Antonio Wells: 1 att, 4 yards, 0 TD

Receiving

- Cincinnati – Greg Moore: 6 rec, 72 yards, 0 TD
- Marion – Jerard Bennett: 4 rec, 31 yards, 0 TD

=== Week 4: vs Indianapolis Enforcers ===
Week 4: Indianapolis Enforcers at Cincinnati Commandos – Game summary

Quarter	1	2	3	4	Total
Enforcers	0	2	0	0	2
Commandos	26	20	16	20	82

at Cincinnati Gardens, Cincinnati, Ohio

- Date: March 19
- Game time: 7:30 p.m. EDT

Game information

1st quarter

- Cincinnati - (14:50) Moe Lee 25-yard pass from Tyler Sheehan (Justin McClain kick failed), Cincinnati 6-0
- Cincinnati – (11:51) Jeff Franklin 33-yard interception return (Justin McClain kick failed), Cincinnati 12–0
- Cincinnati - (7:32) Kyenes Mincy 27-yard pass from Tyler Sheehan (Tyler Sheehan pass failed), Cincinnati 18-0
- Cincinnati - (1:41) Brandon Boehm 28-yard pass from Tyler Sheehan (Derrick Moss rush), Cincinnati 26-0

2nd quarter

- Cincinnati - (12:02) Moe Lee 31-yard pass from Tyler Sheehan (Charles Hawkins pass from Tyler Sheehan), Cincinnati 34-0
- Cincinnati - (2:17) Brandon Boehm 25-yard pass from Tyler Sheehan (Justin McClain rush fumbled), Cincinnati 40-0
- Indianapolis - (2:17) Drew Russ PAT return, Cincinnati 40-2
- Cincinnati - (0:02) Thomas Claggett 0-yard fumble recovery (Tyler Sheehan pass failed), Cincinnati 46-2

3rd quarter

- Cincinnati - (10:36) Keith Brooks 2-yard rush (Keith Brooks pass from Tyler Sheehan), Cincinnati 54-2
- Cincinnati - (2:14) Brandon Boehm 21-yard pass from Tyler Sheehan (James Frazier rush), Cincinnati 62-2

4th quarter

- Cincinnati - (4:28) David Wess 13-yard fumble recovery (Frank Straub pass from Tyler Sheehan), Cincinnati 70-2
- Cincinnati - (0:24) Kyenes Mincy 19-yard pass from Tyler Sheehan (James Fraizer rush failed), Cincinnati 76-2
- Cincinnati - (0:02) Kyenes Mincy 2-yard pass from Tyler Sheehan (Keith Brooks rush failed), Cincinnati 82-2

Passing

- Indianapolis – Mike Whitaker: 7/24, 66 yards, 0 TD
- Cincinnati – Tyler Sheehan: 21/31, 289 yards, 8 TD

Rushing

- Indianapolis – DeRon Jenkins: 1 att, 3 yards, 0 TD
- Cincinnati – Keith Brooks: 4 att, 8 yards, 1 TD

Receiving

- Indianapolis – Montez Williams: 4 rec, 30 yards, 0 TD
- Cincinnati – Moe Lee: 6 rec, 108 yards, 2 TD

On March 19, quarterback Tyler Sheehan broke a Commandos record, by throwing 8 touchdown passes against the Indianapolis Enforcers. The previous record had been 7, which Mauk achieved twice in the 2010 season.

=== Week 6: vs Dayton Silverbacks ===
Week 6: Cincinnati Commandos at Dayton Silverbacks – Game summary

Quarter	1	2	3	4	Total
Commandos	14	0	6	12	32
Silverbacks	0	9	6	0	15

at Hara Arena, Trotwood, Ohio

- Date: April 2
- Game time: 7:30 p.m. EDT

Game information

1st quarter

- Cincinnati – (10:13) Greg Moore 1-yard rush (Brandon Yingling kick), Cincinnati 7–0
- Cincinnati – (6:00) Derrick Moss 1-yard rush (Brandon Yingling kick), Cincinnati 14–0

2nd quarter

- Dayton - (14:13) Daniel Stover 32-yard pass from Chris Stanford (Jeff Hubbard kick failed), Cincinnati 14-6
- Dayton – (4:25) Jeff Hubbard 23-yard field goal, Cincinnati 14–9

3rd quarter

- Dayton - (13:53) Daniel Stover 27-yard pass from Chris Stanford (Jeff Hubbard kick failed), Dayton 15-14
- Cincinnati - (11:18) Greg Moore 13-yard pass from Tyler Sheehan (Derrick Moss rush failed), Cincinnati 20-15

4th quarter

- Cincinnati - (5:02) Greg Moore 2-yard rush (Tyler Sheehan pass failed), Cincinnati 26-15
- Cincinnati - (2:22) Moe Lee 11-yard pass from Tyler Sheehan (Tyler Sheehan pass failed), Cincinnati 32-15

Passing

- Cincinnati – Tyler Sheehan: 16/35, 188 yards, 2 TD
- Dayton – Chris Stanford: 9/19, 121 yards, 2 TD

Rushing

- Cincinnati – Greg Moore: 10 att, 14 yards, 1 TD
- Dayton – Chris Stanford: 5 att, 45 yards, 0 TD

Receiving

- Cincinnati – Brandon Boehm: 4 rec, 66 yards, 0 TD
- Dayton – Daniel Stover: 4 rec, 100 yards, 2 TD

=== Week 7: vs Port Huron Predators ===
Week 7: Port Huron Predators at Cincinnati Commandos – Game summary

Quarter	1	2	3	4	Total
Predators	0	6	8	8	22
Commandos	7	19	7	14	47

at Cincinnati Gardens, Cincinnati, Ohio

- Date: April 8
- Game time: 7:30 p.m. EDT
- Referee: Dave Stein

Game information

1st quarter

- Cincinnati - (1:58) Phillip Barnett 10-yard pass from George Murray (Brandon Yingling kick), Cincinnati 7-0

2nd quarter

- Cincinnati - (8:49) Derrick Moss 14-yard rush (Brandon Yingling kick failed), Cincinnati 13-0
- Port Huron - (5:02) Anthony Gay 1-yard rush (Chris Tatti kick failed), Cincinnati 13-6
- Cincinnati - (2:38) J Baker 16-yard pass from George Murray (Brandon Yingling kick failed), Cincinnati 19-6
- Cincinnati - (1:37) Charles Hawkins 38-yard pass from George Murray (Brandon Yingling kick), Cincinnati 26-6

3rd quarter

- Cincinnati - (8:20) Derrick Moss 30-yard rush (Brandon Yingling kick), Cincinnati 33-6
- Port Huron - (5:18) Anthony Gay 11-yard rush (Erick Knott pass from M Akrawi), Cincinnati 33-14

4th quarter

- Port Huron - (9:05) Anthony Gay 42-yard rush (Ruben Gay rush), Cincinnati 33-22
- Cincinnati - (6:04) George Murray 3-yard rush (George Murray rush), Cincinnati 41-22
- Cincinnati - (0:00) Derrick Moss 14-yard rush (none attempted), Cincinnati 47-22

Passing

- Port huron – Mike Akrawi: 6/16, 49 yards, 0 TD
- Cincinnati – George Murray: 8/16, 96 yards, 3 TD

Rushing

- Port huron – Anthony Gay: 12 att, 96 yards, 3 TD
- Cincinnati – Derrick Moss: 10 att, 91 yards, 3 TD

Receiving

- Port huron – Devon Daniels: 3 rec, 34 yards, 0 TD
- Cincinnati – Phillip Barnett: 2 rec, 26 yards, 1 TD

=== Week 10: vs Dayton Silverbacks ===
Week 10: Cincinnati Commandos at Dayton Silverbacks – Game summary

Quarter	1	2	3	4	Total
Silverbacks	0	7	0	0	7
Commandos	14	7	7	13	41

at Cincinnati Gardens, Cincinnati, Ohio

- Date: April 29
- Game time: 8:05 p.m. EDT
- Referee: Les Anderson

Game information

1st quarter

- Cincinnati – (6:24) Tyler Sheehan 5-yard rush (Brandon Yingling kick), Cincinnati 7–0
- Cincinnati – (1:28) Marcus Spencer 51-yard interception return (Brandon Yingling kick), Cincinnati 14–0

2nd quarter

- Dayton - (13:33) Daniel Stover 6-yard pass from Jarvis Taylor (Jeff Hubbard kick), Cincinnati 14-7
- Cincinnati – (2:11) Tyler Sheehan 1-yard rush (Brandon Yingling kick), Cincinnati 21–7

3rd quarter

- Cincinnati - (8:06) Greg Moore 6-yard rush (Brandon Yingling kick), Cincinnati 28-7

4th quarter

- Cincinnati - (9:55) Derrick Moss 1-yard rush (Brandon Yingling kick), Cincinnati 35-7
- Cincinnati - (5:43) Phillip Barnett 30-yard pass from Tyler Sheehan (Brandon Yingling kick failed), Cincinnati 41-7

Passing

- Dayton – Jarvis Taylor: 6/19, 40 yards, 1 TD
- Cincinnati – Tyler Sheehan: 10/21, 113 yards, 1 TD

Rushing

- Dayton – Ronald Russell: 7 att, 13 yards, 0 TD
- Cincinnati – Greg Moore: 7 att, 42 yards, 1 TD

Receiving

- Dayton – Daniel Stover: 3 rec, 28 yards, 1 TD
- Cincinnati – Phillip Barnett: 2 rec, 50 yards, 1 TD

=== Week 11: vs Chicago Knights ===
Week 11: Cincinnati Commandos at Chicago Knights – Game summary

Quarter	1	2	3	4	Total
Commandos	14	7	0	27	48
Knights	6	13	6	16	41

at Victory Sports Complex, Loves Park, Illinois

- Date: May 8
- Game time: 7:30 p.m. CDT

Game information

1st quarter

- Cincinnati – (10:04) Derrick Moss 3-yard rush (Brandon Yingling kick), Cincinnati 7–0
- Cincinnati - (5:51) Phillip Barnett 3-yard pass from George Murray (Brandon Yingling kick), Cincinnati 14-0
- Chicago - (4:10) Zontavious Johnson 12-yard pass from Brandon Jewett (Julie Harshbarger kick failed), Cincinnati 14-6

2nd quarter

- Chicago - (7:35) Brandon Wogoman 19-yard pass from Brandon Jewett (James Cichon rush failed), Cincinnati 14-12
- Cincinnati – (5:36) Derrick Moss 16-yard rush (Brandon Yingling kick), Cincinnati 21–12
- Chicago - (1:12) Shawn McKeown 1-yard rush (Julie Harshbarger kick), Cincinnati 21-19

3rd quarter

- Chicago - (8:55) Willie Tolon 8-yard pass from Brandon Jewett (James Cichon rush failed), Chicago 25-21

4th quarter

- Cincinnati – (13:17) Derrick Moss 1-yard rush (George Murray pass failed), Cincinnati 27–25
- Chicago - (7:55) Julie Harshbarger 20-yard field goal, Chicago 28-27
- Chicago - (5:42) Brandon Wogoman 38-yard pass from Brandon Jewett (Brandon Jewett pass failed), Chicago 34-27
- Cincinnati - (3:18) Brandon Boehm 15-yard pass from George Murray (Brandon Yingling kick), 34-34
- Chicago - (1:53) Zontavious Johnson 27-yard pass from Brandon Jewett (Julie Harshbarger kick), Chicago 41-34
- Cincinnati - (0:31) Greg Moore 19-yard pass from George Murray (Brandon Yingling kick failed), Chicago 41-40
- Cincinnati - (0:05) Kyenes Mincy 15-yard pass from George Murray (Greg Moore rush), Cincinnati 48-41

Passing

- Cincinnati – George Murray: 10/27, 110 yards, 4 TD
- Chicago – Brandon Jewett: 13/21, 183 yards, 5 TD

Rushing

- Cincinnati – Derrick Moss: 10 att, 32 yards, 3 TD
- Chicago – Brandon Jewett: 4 att, 14 yards, 0 TD

Receiving

- Cincinnati – Brandon Boeh,: 3 rec, 40 yards, 1 TD
- Chicago – Brandon Wogoman: 4 rec, 91 yards, 2 TD

=== Week 12: vs Port Huron Predators ===
Week 12: Cincinnati Commandos at Port Huron Predators – Game summary

Quarter	1	2	3	4	Total
Commandos	2	0	0	0	2
Predators	0	0	0	0	0

at McMorran Arena, Port Huron, Michigan

- Date: May 14
- Game time: 7:30 p.m. EDT

Game information
Port Huron Forfeit

=== Week 13: vs Indianapolis Enforcers ===
Week 13: Indianapolis Enforcers at Cincinnati Commandos – Game summary

Quarter	1	2	3	4	Total
Enforcers	0	0	0	0	0
Commandos	14	15	26	26	81

at Cincinnati Gardens, Cincinnati, Ohio

- Date: May 21
- Game time: 7:30 p.m. EDT
- Referee: Tommy Tyks

Game information

1st quarter

- Cincinnati - (12:42) George Murray 12-yard pass from Tyler Sheehan (Brandon Yingling kick failed), Cincinnati 6-0
- Cincinnati – (2:05) Tyler Sheehan 1-yard rush (Frank Straub pass from Tyler Sheehan), Cincinnati 14–0

2nd quarter

- Cincinnati - (12:57) Brandon Boehm 24-yard pass from Tyler Sheehan (George Murray pass from Tyler Sheehan), Cincinnati 22-0
- Cincinnati - (10:03) Kyenes Mincy 5-yard pass from Tyler Sheehan (Brandon Yingling kick), Cincinnati 29-0

3rd quarter

- Cincinnati - (13:56) Kyenes Mincy 27-yard pass from Tyler Sheehan (Brandon Yingling kick), Cincinnati 36-0
- Cincinnati - (11:45) Phillip Barnett 2-yard pass from George Murray (Brandon Yingling kick failed), Cincinnati 42-0
- Cincinnati - (6:12) Keith Brooks 3-yard rush (Brandon Yingling kick), Cincinnati 49-0
- Cincinnati - (0:21) Phillip Barnett 19-yard pass from George Murray (Brandon Boehm pass failed), Cincinnati 55-0

4th quarter

- Cincinnati - (11:00) Kyenes Mincy 32-yard pass from George Murray (Brandon Yingling kick), Cincinnati 62-0
- Cincinnati - (5:31) Phillip Barnett 19-yard pass from George Murray (Brandon Yingling kick failed), Cincinnati 68-0
- Cincinnati - (3:30) Jeff Franklin 23-yard interception return (Brandon Yingling kick failed), Cincinnati 74-0
- Cincinnati - (0:23) Wendell Brown 0-yard fumble recovery (Brandon Yingling kick), Cincinnati 81-0

Passing

- Indianapolis – DeMarcus Simons: 5/21, 37 yards, 0 TD
- Cincinnati – George Murray: 8/11, 112 yards, 4 TD

Rushing

- Indianapolis – Darnell Taylor: 3 att, 3 yards, 0 TD
- Cincinnati – Greg Moore: 2 att, 32 yards, 0 TD

Receiving

- Indianapolis – Montez Williams: 2 rec, 9 yards, 0 TD
- Cincinnati – Phillip Barnett: 5 rec, 64 yards, 3 TD

=== Week 14: vs Marion Blue Racers ===
Week 14: Marion Blue Racers at Cincinnati Commandos – Game summary

Quarter	1	2	3	4	Total
Blue Racers	0	7	6	7	20
Commandos	13	10	0	27	50

at Cincinnati Gardens, Cincinnati, Ohio

- Date: May 28
- Game time: 7:30 p.m. EDT
- Referee: Tommy Tyks

Game information

1st quarter

- Cincinnati – (10:24) Kyenes Mincy 16-yard pass from Tyler Sheehan (Brandon Boehm rush failed), Cincinnati 6–0
- Cincinnati – (1:21) Phillip Barnett 7-yard pass from Tyler Sheehan (Brandon Yingling kick), Cincinnati 13–0

2nd quarter

- Cincinnati – (3:01) Brandon Yingling 28-yard field goal, Cincinnati 16-0
- Marion – (0:53) Josh Harris 1-yard rush (Tyler Lorenz kick), Cincinnati 16–7
- Cincinnati - (0:27) Derrick Moss 4-yard rush (Brandon Yingling kick), Cincinnati 23-7

3rd quarter

- Marion – (7:40) Josh Harris 5-yard rush (Tyler Lorenz kick blocked), Cincinnati 23–13

4th quarter

- Cincinnati - (13:03) Tyler Sheehan 3-yard rush (Brandon Yingling kick), Cincinnati 30-13
- Marion - (10:40) Marc Huddelston 14-yard pass from Josh Harris (Tyler Lorenz kick), Cincinnati 30-20
- Cincinnati - (8:12) Derrick Moss 23-yard pass from Tyler Sheehan (Brandon Yingling kick), Cincinnati 37-20
- Cincinnati - (4:23) Terrill Byrd 15-yard fumble recovery (Brandon Yingling kick), Cincinnati 44-20
- Cincinnati – (0:00) Phillip Barnett 22-yard pass from Tyler Sheehan (None Attempted), Cincinnati 50–20

Passing

- Marion – Josh Harris: 10/18, 64 yards, 1 TD
- Cincinnati – Tyler Sheehan: 14/27, 157 yards, 4 TD

Rushing

- Marion – Josh Harris: 10 att, 37 yards, 2 TD
- Cincinnati – Derrick Moss: 8 att, 38 yards, 1 TD

Receiving

- Marion – Marc Huddelston: 3 rec, 25 yards, 1 TD
- Cincinnati – George Murray: 7 rec, 61 yards, 0 TD

On May 29, 2011, the Commandos completed their first ever undefeated regular season, with a 50-20 win over the Marion Blue Racers, in what was a battle for first place and home field advantage throughout the CIFL Playoffs.

== Playoffs ==
=== 2011 1 vs 4 Semifinal Game vs. Chicago Knights ===
2011 1 vs 4 Semifinal Game: Chicago Knights at Cincinnati Commandos – Game summary

Quarter	1	2	3	4	Total
Knights	0	13	0	0	13
Commandos	20	28	7	16	71

at Cincinnati Gardens, Cincinnati, Ohio

- Date: June 3
- Game time: 8:05 p.m. EDT
- Referee: Les Anderson

Game information

1st quarter

- Cincinnati - (13:17) Derrick Moss 14-yard pass from Tyler Sheehan (Brandon Yingling kick), Cincinnati 7-0
- Cincinnati - (8:23) Kyenes Mincy 9-yard pass from Tyler Sheehan (Brandon Yingling kick blocked), Cincinnati 13-0
- Cincinnati - (2:00) Derrick Moss 1-yard rush, (Brandon Yingling kick), Cincinnati 20-0

2nd quarter

- Chicago - (14:52) Willie Tolon 9-yard pass from Brandon Jewett, (Julie Harshbarger kick), Cincinnati 20-7
- Cincinnati - (12:53) Kyenes Mincy 23-yard pass from Tyler Sheehan (Shawn McGarity pass failed), Cincinnati 26-7
- Chicago - (11:15) Shawn McKeown 39-yard pass from Brandon Jewett, (Julie Harshbarger kick blocked), Cincinnati 26-13
- Cincinnati - (11:15) Fabian Connor PAT return, Cincinnati 28-13
- Cincinnati - (9:16) Phillip Barnett 27-yard pass from Tyler Sheehan (Brandon Yingling kick failed), Cincinnati 34-13
- Cincinnati - (5:38) Shawn McGarity 11-yard pass from Tyler Sheehan (Greg Moore rush), Cincinnati 42-13
- Cincinnati - (1:27) Derrick Moss 14-yard pass from Tyler Sheehan (Brandon Yingling kick failed), Cincinnati 48-13

3rd quarter

- Cincinnati - (10:56) Kyenes Mincy 2-yard pass from Tyler Sheehan (Brandon Yingling kick), Cincinnati 55-13

4th quarter

- Cincinnati - (12:21) Brandon Boehm 13-yard pass from Tyler Sheehan (Brandon Yingling kick failed), Cincinnati 61-13
- Cincinnati - (8:08) Phillip Barnett 20-yard pass from Tyler Sheehan (Brandon Yingling kick), Cincinnati 68-13
- Cincinnati - (1:16) Brandon Yingling 32-yard field goal, Cincinnati 71-13

Passing

- Chicago – Brandon Jewett: 12/28, 137 yards, 2 TD
- Cincinnati – Tyler Sheehan: 17/27, 194 yards, 9 TD

Rushing

- Chicago – Mike Keeton: 1 att, 2 yards, 0 TD
- Cincinnati – Derrick Moss: 8 att, 36 yards, 1 TD

Receiving

- Chicago – Shawn McGarity: 5 rec, 99 yards, 1 TD
- Cincinnati – Phillip Barnett: 6 rec, 89 yards, 2 TD

=== 2011 CIFL Championship Game: vs. Marion Blue Racers ===
2011 CIFL Championship Game: Marion Blue Racers at Cincinnati Commandos – Game summary

Quarter	1	2	3	4	Total
Blue Racers	0	13	3	13	29
Commandos	7	14	13	10	44

at Cincinnati Gardens, Cincinnati, Ohio

- Date: June 11
- Game time: 7:30 p.m. EDT

Game information

1st quarter

- Cincinnati - (6:17) Tyler Sheehan 1-yard rush, (Brandon Yingling kick), Cincinnati 7-0

2nd quarter

- Cincinnati - (12:57) Kyenes Mincy 9-yard pass from Tyler Sheehan (Brandon Yingling kick), Cincinnati 14-0
- Cincinnati - (6:15) James Frazier 49-yard fumble recovery (Brandon Yingling kick), Cincinnati 21-0
- Marion - (2:04) Christen Haywood 30-yard rush, (Tyler Lorenz kick), Cincinnati 21-7
- Marion - (0:00) Brandon Williams 3-yard pass from Josh Harris, (Tyler Lorenz kick failed), Cincinnati 21-13

3rd quarter

- Cincinnati - (11:19) George Murrey 6-yard pass from Tyler Sheehan (Brandon Yingling kick), Cincinnati 28-13
- Marion - (5:07) Tyler Lorenz 43-yard field goal, Cincinnati 28-16
- Cincinnati - (2:47) Greg Moore 2-yard rush, (Brandon Yingling kick failed), Cincinnati 34-16

4th quarter

- Marion - (12:37) Christen Haywood 1-yard rush, (Tyler Lorenz kick), Cincinnati 34-23
- Cincinnati - (7:45) Brandon Boehm 19-yard pass from Tyler Sheehan (Brandon Yingling kick), Cincinnati 41-23
- Marion - (4:14) Brandon Williams 3-yard pass from Josh Harris, (Christen Haywood rush failed), Cincinnati 41-29
- Cincinnati - (0:48) Brandon Yingling 33-yard field goal, Cincinnati 44-29

Passing

- Marion – Josh Harris: 4/14, 15 yards, 2 TD
- Cincinnati – Tyler Sheehan: 8/19, 93 yards, 3 TD

Rushing

- Marion – Christen Haywood: 18 att, 107 yards, 2 TD
- Cincinnati – Tyler Sheehan: 2 att, 28 yards, 1 TD

Receiving

- Marion – Brandon Williams: 2 rec, 6 yards, 2 TD
- Cincinnati – Brandon Boehm: 2 rec, 36 yards, 1 TD

== Award winners ==
- CIFL MVP - Tyler Sheehan
- CIFL Offensive Player of the Year - Tyler Sheehan
