= 2011 Port Huron Predators season =

- Owner: Rachael Brusate
- Head coach: Jason Lovelock (fired March 28: 2-1 record); John Forti (interim)
- Home stadium: McMorran Arena; 701 McMorran Boulevard; Port Huron, MI 48060

Results
- Record: 2-8
- League place: 5th
- Playoffs: did not qualify

The 2011 Port Huron Predators season was the first season for the Continental Indoor Football League (CIFL) franchise. They were the first team in Port Huron since the Port Huron Pirates played there in 2007. On February 26, 2011, the Predators won their first game in franchise history, with a 69-12 victory over the visiting Indianapolis Enforcers. They got off to a quick start after a brief scare and never looked back. After the Enforcers brought back the opening kick-off to the Predators nine-yard line, the Port Huron defense stepped up and picked off the first play from scrimmage. It was the first of seven interceptions by the Predators' defense. On the next play, Predators back-up quarterback Jim Roth, who was filling in for Damon Dowdell, found Robert Height for a 41-yard score to put the team ahead for good. The Predators carried the 7-0 into the second quarter and led 21-6 at the half. In the second half, the flood gates opened as the Enforcers, a first-year team travel team, showed their inexperience with several mistakes. After several interceptions and fumbles, Port Huron took a commanding 47-6 lead into the third quarter before going on to win by the lopsided score. On March 28, the Predators fired their second coach of the season as well as their director of operations. Head Coach Jason Lovelock was let go after Brusate said, "The players wanted something different." As for Director of Operations, Julie Crankshaw, Brusate cited, "We had different ideas on what should be done. She was fired. She didn't live up to her contract; she didn't fulfill it. So there is no need to fulfill my end." Brusate appointed Offensive Coordinator, John Forti, as the Interim Head Coach. On April 2, Forti lead the team into his first game as Head Coach, and lead the team to a 29-45 defeat to the Chicago Knights, who hadn't won a game in over 2 season. The Predators announced on April 28, 2011 that they would be forfeiting the rest of the season.

== Schedule ==
Week	Date	Opponent	Home/Away	Result
1	February 26	Indianapolis Enforcers	Home	Won 69-12
2	March 5	Marion Blue Racers	Away	Lost 37-44
3		Bye	Week	
4	March 19	Dayton Silverbacks	Home	Won 61-34
5		Bye	Week	
6	April 2	Chicago Knights	Home	Lost 29-45
7	April 8	Cincinnati Commandos	Away	Lost 22-47
8	April 16	Marion Blue Racers	Home	Lost 15-47
9		Bye	Week	
10	April 30	Indianapolis Enforcers	Home	Lost 0-2 (Forfeit)
11		Bye	Week	
12	May 14	Cincinnati Commandos	Home	Lost 0-2 (Forfeit)
13		Bye	Week	
14	May 26	Dayton Silverbacks	Away	Lost 0-2 (Forfeit)
15	June 4	Chicago Knights	Away	Lost 0-2 (Forfeit)

== Standings ==
2011 Continental Indoor Football League
Team	W	L	T	PCT	PF	PA	PF (Avg.)	PA (Avg.)	STK
Cincinnati Commandos-y	10	0	0	1.000	484	158	53.77	17.55	W10
Marion Blue Racers-x	8	2	0	.800	455	218	45.5	21.8	L1
Dayton Silverbacks-x	5	5	0	.500	288	265	32	39.4	W3
Chicago Knights-x	4	6	0	.400	255	295	28.33	32.77	L5
Port Huron Predators	2	8	0	.200	238	226	39.6	37.6	L7
Indianapolis Enforcers	1	9	0	.100	71	621	7.88	69	L3

== Roster ==
Port Huron Predators roster
Quarterbacks: 10 Adam Hurst; 7 Jim Roth; Offensive backs: 5 Levi Raines; Receivers: 6 Devon Daniels; 24 Daryl Frager; 4 Robert Height; 23 Jeremiah McLauren; 1 Terry Mitchell	Offensive linemen: 31 Quentin Celano; 55 Rodney Hamilton; 92 Eric Knott; 76 Antonio Martin; Defensive linemen: 3 Jeff Dembowske; 44 Mike Matyniak; 91 Jim Strafford; 90 Antonio Young	Linebackers: 20 Anthony Calamita; 8 Roger Sippio; Defensive backs: 9 Ruben Gay; 17 Darnell Hood; 2 Ernie Smith; Kickers: 22 Chris Tatti	Inactive: -- Rasko Apostolovski K; -- Rondell Biggs DL; -- Damon Dowdell QB; -- Neal Duaul OL; -- Eze Ejelanu; -- Anthony Gay WR; -- Kenneth Hamilton OL; -- Justin McKinney DB; -- Evan McWhite WR; -- Gino Panza DL; 24 Andre Raines WR; 10 Calvin Toliver; Injured Reserve: currently vacant'; rookies in italics; Updated 2011-04-02; 22 Active, 12 Inactive

== Stats ==
=== Passing ===
Player	Comp.	Att.	Comp%	Yards	TD's	INT's	Rating
Jim Roth	27	65	41.5%	320	9	5	88.8
Mike Akrawi	10	30	33.3%	88	0	2	2.8
Calvin Toliver	5	14	35.7%	31	1	3	44.3

=== Rushing ===
Player	Car.	Yards	Avg.	TD's	Long
Levi Raines	26	232	8.9	6	28
Anthony Gay	24	175	7.3	4	49
Robert Height	18	84	4.7	4	16
Jim Roth	13	71	5.5	2	19

=== Receiving ===
Player	Rec.	Yards	Avg.	TD's	Long
Devon Daniels	14	179	12.8	4	22
Robert Height	9	85	9.4	3	14
Terry Mitchell	7	107	15.3	2	34
Anthony Gay	4	13	3.2	0	6

== Regular season ==
=== Week 1: vs Indianapolis Enforcers ===
Week 1: Indianapolis Enforcers at Port Huron Predators – Game summary

Quarter	1	2	3	4	Total
Enforcers	0	6	0	6	12
Predators	7	14	26	22	69

at McMorran Arena, Port Huron, Michigan

- Date: February 26
- Game time: 7:30 p.m. EDT
- Game attendance: 1,931

Game information

1st quarter

- Port huron – (13:28) Robert Height 13-yard pass from Jim Roth (Rasko Apostolvski kick), Port Huron 7–0

2nd quarter

- Port Huron - (13:23) Levi Raines 11-yard rush (Rasko Apostovlski kick), Port Huron 14-0
- Indianapolis - (6:28) Montez Williams 10-yard pass from Mike Whitaker (Ian Pocurro rush failed), Port Huron 14-6
- Port huron – (4:26) Robert Height 12-yard rush (Rasko Apostovlski kick), Port Huron 21–6

3rd quarter

- Port Huron - (13:26) Levi Raines 11-yard pass from Jim Roth (Rasko Apostovlski kick), Port Huron 28-6
- Port Huron - (7:16) Levi Raines 5-yard rush (Rasko Apostovlski kick failed), Port Huron 34-6
- Port Huron - (5:46) Anthony Calamita 10-yard interception return (Rasko Apostovlski kick), Port Huron 41-6
- Port huron – (0:43) Robert Height 15-yard rush (Ruben Gay rush failed), Port Huron 47–6

4th quarter

- Port huron – (8:40) Anthony Gay 49-yard rush (Rasko Apostovlski kick), Port Huron 54–6
- Indianapolis - (6:43) Montez Williams 24-yard pass from Mike Whitaker (Troy Summers rush failed), Port Huron 54-12
- Port huron – (4:53) Justin McKinny 25-yard kickoff return (Rasko Apostovlski kick), Port Huron 61–12
- Port huron – (2:13) Andre Raines 0-yard fumble recovery (Rasko Apostovlski kick), Port Huron 68–12
- Port huron – (1:27) Team Rouge, Port Huron 69–12

Passing

- Indianapolis – Mike Whitaker: 15/34, 73 yards, 2 TD
- Port huron – Jim Roth: 4/8, 60 yards, 2 TD

Rushing

- Indianapolis – Troy Summers: 2 att, 23 yards, 0 TD
- Port huron – Levi Raines: 7 att, 78 yards, 2 TD

Receiving

- Indianapolis – Montez Williams: 6 rec, 51 yards, 2 TD
- Port huron – Ernie Smith: 1 rec, 23 yards, 0 TD

=== Week 2: vs Marion Blue Racers ===
Week 2: Port Huron Predators at Marion Blue Racers – Game summary

Quarter	1	2	3	4	Total
Predators	6	19	12	0	37
Blue Racers	7	13	3	21	44

at Veterans Memorial Coliseum, Marion, Ohio

- Date: March 5
- Game time: 7:30 p.m. EDT
- Game attendance: 1,200
- Referee: Les Anderson

Game information

1st quarter

- Marion - (4:45) Mike Tatum 8-yard pass from Josh Harris (Tyler Lorenz kick), Marion 7-0
- Port huron – (2:08) Jim Roth 7-yard rush (Rasko Apostolovski kick failed), Marion 7–6

2nd quarter

- Marion - (14:05) Christen Haywood 8-yard pass from Josh Harris (Tyler Lorenz kick failed), Marion 13-6
- Port Huron - (6:28) Devon Daniels 3-yard pass from Jim Roth (Rasko Apostolovski kick), 13-13
- Port Huron - (0:30) Levi Raines 3-yard rush (Rasko Apostolovski kick failed), Port Huron 19-13
- Marion - (0:16) Mike Tatum 6-yard pass from Josh Harris (Tyler Lorenz kick), Marion 20-19
- Port Huron - (0:04) Robert Height 7-yard pass from Jim Roth (Jim Roth pass failed), Port Huron 25-20

3rd quarter

- Port Huron - (5:40) Levi Raines 9-yard rush (Jim Roth pass failed), Port Huron 31-20
- Marion – (2:36) Tyler Lorenz 41-yard field goal, Port Huron 31-23
- Port Huron - (1:28) Levi Raines 19-yard rush (Jim Roth rush failed), Port Huron 37-23

4th quarter

- Marion - (10:54) Mike Tatum 9-yard pass from Josh Harris (Tyler Lorenz kick), Port Huron 37-30
- Marion - (3:23) Josh Harris 3-yard rush (Tyler Lorenz kick), 37-37
- Marion - (0:27) Josh Harris 12-yard rush (Tyler Lorenz kick), Marion 44-37

Passing

- Port huron – Jim Roth: 8/23, 74 yards, 2 TD
- Marion – Josh Harris: 7/12, 37 yards, 4 TD

Rushing

- Port huron – Levi Raines: 17 att, 127 yards, 3 TD
- Marion – Josh Harris: 11 att, 48 yards, 2 TD

Receiving

- Port huron – Robert Height: 4 rec, 41 yards, 1 TD
- Marion – Mike Tatum: 4 rec, 26 yards, 3 TD

=== Week 4: vs Dayton Silverbacks ===
Week 4: Dayton Silverbacks at Port Huron Predators – Game summary

Quarter	1	2	3	4	Total
Silverbacks	13	7	8	6	34
Predators	13	23	18	7	61

at McMorran Arena, Port Huron, Michigan

- Date: March 19
- Game time: 7:30 p.m. EDT
- Game attendance: 1,700

Game information

1st quarter

- Dayton – (8:45) Daniel Stover 7-yard pass from Jeremy Greenleaf (Jeff Hubbard kick), Dayton 7–0
- Port huron – (5:57) Robert Height 7-yard rush (Anthony Gay kick blocked), Dayton 7–6
- Port Huron - (1:15) Devon Daniels 22-yard pass from Jim Roth (Anthony Gay kick), Port Huron 13-7
- Dayton - (0:24) Fred Cromartie 45-yard kickoff return (Jeff Hubbard kick failed), 13-13

2nd quarter

- Port Huron - (11:17) Jeff Dempowske safety, Port Huron 15-13
- Port Huron - (11:13) Levi Raines 28-yard rush (Levi Raines rush), Port Huron 23-13
- Dayton - (7:37) Fred Cromartie 4-yard rush (Jeff Hubbard kick), Port Huron 23-20
- Port huron – (5:51) Terry Mitchell 34-yard pass from Jim Roth (Anthony Gay kick), Port Huron 30–20
- Port huron – (1:51) Roger Sippio 32-yard interception return (Jeff Hubbard kick), Port Huron 36–20

3rd quarter

- Port Huron - (14:04) Robert Height 16-yard rush (Anthony Gay kick), Port Huron 43-20
- Port huron – (6:41) Anthony Gay 27-yard field goal, Port Huron 46–20
- Port Huron - (5:46) Devon Daniels 40-yard fumble return (Robert Height rush), Port Huron 54-20
- Dayton - (2:14) Melvin Bryant 34-yard pass from Bruce Jones (Melvin Bryant pass from Bruce Jones), Port Huron 54-28

4th quarter

- Port Huron - (5:42) Devon Daniels 22-yard pass from Jim Roth (Anthony Gay kick), Port Huron 61-28
- Dayton - (0:00) Daniel Stover 39-yard pass from Bruce Jones (none attempted), Port Huron 61-34

Passing

- Dayton – Jeremy Greenleaf: 6/19, 61 yards, 1 TD
- Port huron – Jim Roth: 5/11, 92 yards, 3 TD

Rushing

- Dayton – Marcus Fails: 3 att, 7 yards, 0 TD
- Port huron – Robert Height: 10 att, 48 yards, 2 TD

Receiving

- Dayton – Melvin Bryant: 5 rec, 87 yards, 1 TD
- Port huron – Terry Mitchell: 3 rec, 48 yards, 1 TD

=== Week 6: vs Chicago Knights ===
Week 6: Chicago Knights at Port Huron Predators – Game summary

Quarter	1	2	3	4	Total
Knights	7	9	16	13	45
Predators	7	7	8	7	29

at McMorran Arena, Port Huron, Michigan

- Date: April 2
- Game time: 7:30 p.m. EDT
- Game attendance: 1,519
- Referee: Dave Stein

Game information

1st quarter

- Port huron – (3:44) Terry Mitchell 0-yard fumble recovery (Chris Tatti kick), Port Huron 7–0
- Chicago - (0:55) James Chicon 8-yard rush (Julie Harshbarger kick), 7-7

2nd quarter

- Port huron – (13:04) Devon Daniels 14-yard pass from Jim Roth (Chris Tatti kick), Port Huron 14–7
- Chicago - (0:46) Brandon Wogoman 44-yard missed field goal return (Julie Harshbarger kick failed), Port Huron 14-13
- Chicago - (0:01) Julie Harshbarger 26-yard field goal, Chicago 16-14

3rd quarter

- Port huron – (11:13) Jim Roth 11-yard rush (Adam Hurst rush), Port Huron 22–16
- Chicago - (9:07) Zontavius Johnson 23-yard pass from Ron Ricciardi (Julie Harshbarger kick), Chicago 23-22
- Chicago - (7:16) Tyler Damien safety, Chicago 25-22
- Chicago - (1:31) Ty Meyers 8-yard pass from Brandon Wogoman (Julie Harshbarger kick), Chicago 32-22

4th quarter

- Chicago - (7:56) James Chicon 2-yard rush (Julie Harshbarger kick), Chicago 39-22
- Port huron – (4:05) Terry Mitchell 4-yard pass from Jim Roth (Chris Tatti kick), Chicago 39–29
- Chicago - (0:57) Brandon Wogoman 8-yard rush (Brandon Wogoman rush failed), Chicago 45-29

Passing

- Chicago – Ron Ricciardi: 10/17, 111 yards, 1 TD
- Port huron – Jim Roth: 10/23, 94 yards, 2 TD

Rushing

- Chicago – Mike Hayden: 9 att, 36 yards, 0 TD
- Port huron – Adam Hurst: 3 att, 25 yards, 0 TD

Receiving

- Chicago – Willie Tolon: 3 rec, 14 yards, 0 TD
- Port huron – Terry Mitchell: 3 rec, 46 yards, 1 TD

=== Week 7: vs Cincinnati Commandos ===
Week 7: Port Huron Predators at Cincinnati Commandos – Game summary

Quarter	1	2	3	4	Total
Predators	0	6	8	8	22
Commandos	7	19	7	14	47

at Cincinnati Gardens, Cincinnati, Ohio

- Date: April 8
- Game time: 7:30 p.m. EDT
- Referee: Dave Stein

Game information

1st quarter

- Cincinnati - (1:58) Phillip Barnett 10-yard pass from George Murray (Brandon Yingling kick), Cincinnati 7-0

2nd quarter

- Cincinnati - (8:49) Derrick Moss 14-yard rush (Brandon Yingling kick failed), Cincinnati 13-0
- Port Huron - (5:02) Anthony Gay 1-yard rush (Chris Tatti kick failed), Cincinnati 13-6
- Cincinnati - (2:38) J Baker 16-yard pass from George Murray (Brandon Yingling kick failed), Cincinnati 19-6
- Cincinnati - (1:37) Charles Hawkins 38-yard pass from George Murray (Brandon Yingling kick), Cincinnati 26-6

3rd quarter

- Cincinnati - (8:20) Derrick Moss 30-yard rush (Brandon Yingling kick), Cincinnati 33-6
- Port Huron - (5:18) Anthony Gay 11-yard rush (Erick Knott pass from M Akrawi), Cincinnati 33-14

4th quarter

- Port Huron - (9:05) Anthony Gay 42-yard rush (Ruben Gay rush), Cincinnati 33-22
- Cincinnati - (6:04) George Murray 3-yard rush (George Murray rush), Cincinnati 41-22
- Cincinnati - (0:00) Derrick Moss 14-yard rush (none attempted), Cincinnati 47-22

Passing

- Port huron – Mike Akrawi: 6/16, 49 yards, 0 TD
- Cincinnati – George Murray: 8/16, 96 yards, 3 TD

Rushing

- Port huron – Anthony Gay: 12 att, 96 yards, 3 TD
- Cincinnati – Derrick Moss: 10 att, 91 yards, 3 TD

Receiving

- Port huron – Devon Daniels: 3 rec, 34 yards, 0 TD
- Cincinnati – Phillip Barnett: 2 rec, 26 yards, 1 TD

=== Week 8: vs Marion Blue Racers ===
Week 8: Marion Blue Racers at Port Huron Predators – Game summary

Quarter	1	2	3	4	Total
Blue Racers	8	3	7	29	47
Predators	0	9	0	6	15

at McMorran Arena, Port Huron, Michigan

- Date: April 16
- Game time: 7:30 p.m. EDT
- Game attendance: 1,073
- Referee: Les Anderson

Game information

1st quarter

- Marion - (4:45) Mike Tatum 29-yard pass from Josh Harris (Tyler Lorenz kick), Marion 7-0
- Marion – (3:59) Victor Rodriguez rouge, Marion 8–0

2nd quarter

- Port Huron - (7:31) Robert Height 14-yard pass from Calvin Toliver (Ruben Gay pass failed), Marion 8-6
- Port Huron - (0:37) Chris Tatti 27-yard field goal, Port Huron 9-8
- Marion – (0:01) Tyler Lorenz 36-yard field goal, Marion 11-9

3rd quarter

- Marion - (4:49) Brandon Williams 31-yard pass from Josh Harris (B Ickard kick), Marion 18-9

4th quarter

- Marion - (14:53) Mike Tatum 18-yard rush (Tyler Lorenz kick), Marion 25-9
- Port Huron - (13:53) Ruben Gay 3-yard rush (Ruben Gay rush failed), Marion 25-15
- Marion - (12:58) Mike Tatum 45-yard kickoff return (Tyler Lorenz kick), Marion 32-15
- Marion - (9:05) Josh Harris 28-yard rush (Tyler Lorenz kick), 39-15
- Marion – (8:22) Lorenzo Best rouge, Marion 40–15
- Marion - (3:15) Brandon Williams 6-yard pass from Josh Harris (B Ickard kick), Marion 47-15

Passing

- Marion – Josh Harris: 7/18, 113 yards, 3 TD
- Port huron – Mike Akrawi: 4/11, 39 yards, 0 TD

Rushing

- Marion – Josh Harris: 2 att, 29 yards, 1 TD
- Port huron – Anthony Gay: 11 att, 30 yards, 0 TD

Receiving

- Marion – Brandon Williams: 5 rec, 76 yards, 2 TD
- Port huron – Devon Daniels: 4 rec, 56 yards, 0 TD

=== Week 10: vs Indianapolis Enforcers ===
Week 10: Indianapolis Enforcers at Port Huron Predators – Game summary

Quarter	1	2	3	4	Total
Enforcers	2	0	0	0	2
Predators	0	0	0	0	0

at McMorran Arena, Port Huron, Michigan

- Date: April 30
- Game time: 7:30 p.m. EDT

Game information
Port Huron Forfeit

=== Week 12 vs Cincinnati Commandos ===
Week 12: Cincinnati Commandos at Port Huron Predators – Game summary

Quarter	1	2	3	4	Total
Commandos	2	0	0	0	2
Predators	0	0	0	0	0

at McMorran Arena, Port Huron, Michigan

- Date: May 14
- Game time: 7:30 p.m. EDT

Game information
Port Huron Forfeit

=== Week 14: vs Dayton Silverbacks ===
Week 14: Port Huron Predators at Dayton Silverbacks – Game summary

Quarter	1	2	3	4	Total
Predators	0	0	0	0	0
Silverbacks	2	0	0	0	2

at Hara Arena, Dayton, Ohio

- Date: May
- Game time: 7:30 p.m. EDT

Game information
Port Huron Forfeit

=== Week 15: vs Chicago Knights ===
Week 15: Port Huron Predators at Chicago Knights – Game summary

Quarter	1	2	3	4	Total
Predators	0	0	0	0	0
Knights	2	0	0	0	2

at Victory Sport Complex, Loves Park, Illinois

- Date: June 4
- Game time: 7:30 p.m. CDT

Game information
Port Huron Forfeit
