= Tyler Sheehan =

American football player (born 1987)

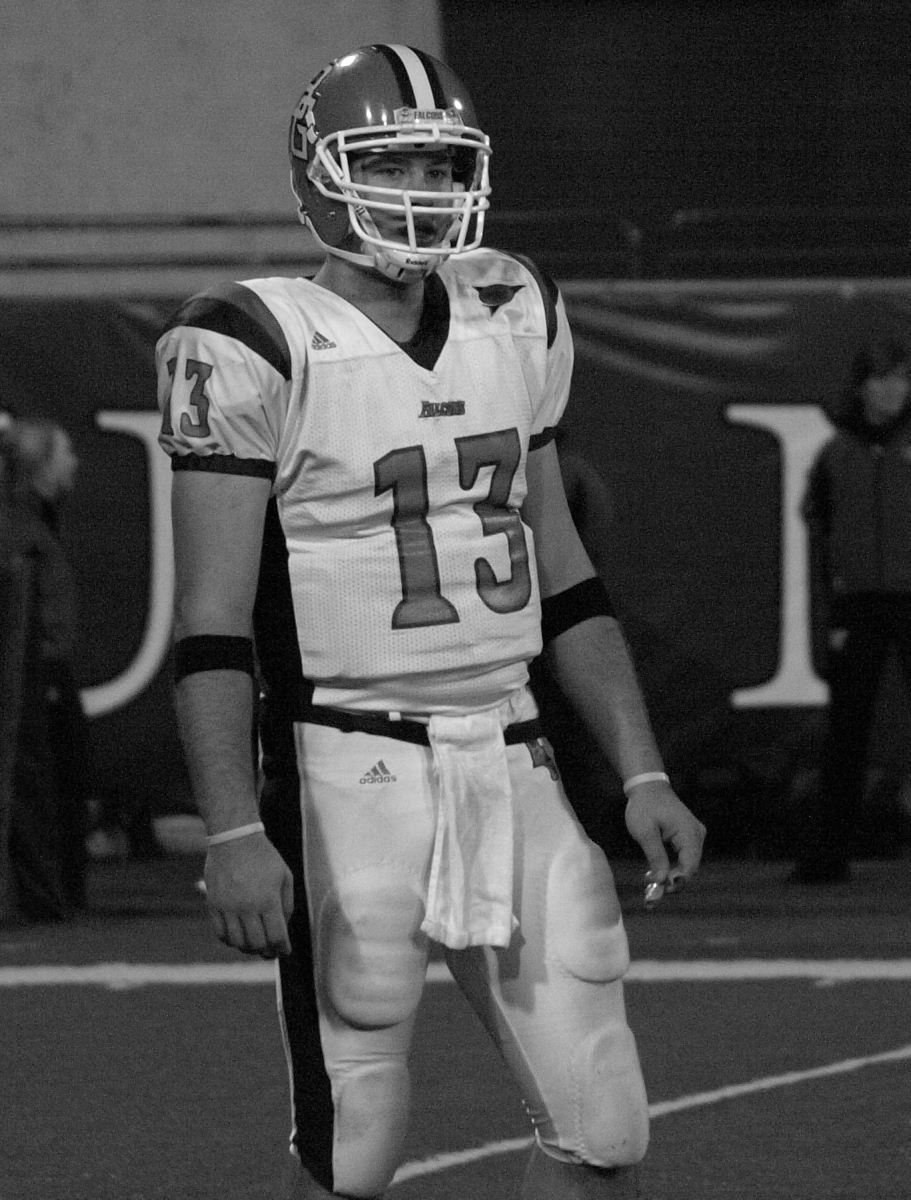
- Sheehan in 2009

No. 13
- Position: Quarterback

Personal information
- Born: November 17, 1987 (age 38); Cincinnati, Ohio, U.S.
- Listed height: 6 ft 3 in (1.91 m)
- Listed weight: 230 lb (104 kg)

Career information
- High school: Cincinnati (OH) La Salle
- College: Bowling Green
- NFL draft: 2010: undrafted

Career history
- Houston Texans (2010)*; Cincinnati Commandos (2011–2012); Arizona Rattlers (2011)*
- * Offseason or practice squad member only

Awards and highlights
- CIFL MVP (2011); CIFL champion (2011); CIFL Championship Game MVP (2011); UIFL champion (2012)
- Stats at ArenaFan.com

Tyler Allen Sheehan is an American former football quarterback. Sheehan played collegiately at Bowling Green State University after a standout career at La Salle High School in Cincinnati, Ohio. After going undrafted in the 2010 NFL draft, he signed with Houston Texans, where he was released after training camp. In 2011, he signed with the Cincinnati Commandos of the Continental Indoor Football League. Sheehan led the Commandos to a perfect 10–0 regular season, winning the league's MVP award. In the playoffs, Sheehan led the Commandos to the 2011 CIFL Championship Game, where they defeated the Marion Blue Racers 44–29. After the Commandos season ended, Sheehan signed with the Arizona Rattlers of the Arena Football League, but never appeared in a game. In 2012, Sheehan returned to the Commandos and led them to a 7–2 record, this time in the United Indoor Football League. The Commandos took the first place seed into the playoffs, and won Ultimate Bowl II 62–44 over the Florida Tarpons.

== Early life ==
Sheehan was born on November 17, 1987, in Cincinnati, Ohio, to parents Dale and Rosalyn Sheehan. His father played football at Wooster. Tyler Sheehan attended La Salle High School, where he was a three-year letterwinner on the football team. As a senior in 2005, he was named the team's most valuable player and the conference Quarterback of the Year. He was also named an all-conference, honorable mention all-city, all-district, and All-Southwest Ohio player. Sheehan also played baseball for two seasons. A Scout.com two-star prospect, he was not highly recruited and received a scholarship offer only from Bowling Green.

College recruiting
Name	Hometown	School	Height	Weight	40^{‡}	Commit date
Tyler Sheehan; QB	Cincinnati, Ohio	La Salle High School	6 ft 4 in (1.93 m)	205 lb (93 kg)	4.75	Nov 29, 2005
Tyler Sheehan; QB	Recruit ratings: Scout: Rivals:					
Overall recruit ranking: Scout: -- (QB) Rivals: -- (QB), -- (OH)
‡ Refers to 40-yard dash; Note: In many cases, Scout, Rivals, 247Sports, On3, and ESPN may conflict in their listings of height, weight and 40 time.; In these cases, the average was taken. ESPN grades are on a 100-point scale.; Sources: "2006 Team Ranking". Rivals.com.

Sheehan committed to Bowling Green State University on November 29, 2005.

== College career ==
Sheehan enrolled at Bowling Green State University and played on the football team as a true freshman. He saw action in four games and completed 23 passes on 43 attempts for 192 yards. He threw for no touchdowns, but four interceptions and was sacked six times. Against Toledo, he passed for 33 yards including a season-long of 21 yards to receiver Corey Partridge.

Prior to the 2007 season, he competed in fall camp with starter Anthony Turner for the number-one position. Sheehan narrowly won the starting job just five days before the season-opener against Minnesota. He started all 13 games of the season and recorded 303 completions on 476 attempts for 3,264 yards and 23 touchdowns, to become the fourth quarterback in school history to throw for 3,000 single-season yards. He threw for 11 interceptions and was sacked 28 times. Sheehan was named the Mid-American Conference (MAC) Offensive Player of the Week three times. In his first career start against Minnesota, he threw for 388 yards and two touchdowns and caught a 24-yard touchdown pass. In overtime, Bowling Green elected to attempt a two-point conversion, rather than tie the score with a kick. Sheehan connected with receiver Freddie Barnes for the game-winning conversion in what The New York Times called "perhaps one of the most exciting of the college football season". That season, he was the nation's only quarterback to record two receiving touchdowns. In the 2008 GMAC Bowl loss to Tulsa, he injured his left ankle late in the first half. Late in the season, USA Today wrote that "Tyler Sheehan directs one of the MAC's most diverse offenses."

That season, he was the only 3,000-yard quarterback in the East Division of the MAC. ESPN compared Sheehan with other top passers in the conference, noting that he threw for fewer interceptions than Dan LeFevour of Central Michigan, and had a higher completion percentage than Nate Davis of Ball State. Sheehan himself said:

Dan [LeFevour] can do more things with his feet than I can, but I think I can make some different throws that he can't make. Nate Davis has a great arm. I think, ability-wise, there's not much difference between us, but we each bring something different to the table to help our team win. And I think our different abilities showed when you look at the stats from last year.

In 2008, he started in all 12 games and completed 267 of 400 passes for 2,610 passing yards and 20 touchdowns, and rushed for 237 yards and seven touchdowns. He threw nine interceptions and was sacked 22 times. Against Ohio, he caught a pass for a 22-yard touchdown. His completion rate of 66.8% was the second-highest in Bowling Green history. Sheehan twice received MAC Offensive Player of the Week honors. Against Wyoming, he threw for 287 yards and two touchdowns, and against Akron, he threw for 239 yards and three touchdowns. Sheehan said that he had adjusted to running the spread offense compared with the previous season. He said, "I don't feel like every mistake I make could cost me my job and things like that. I'm just back there having fun. As practice goes on it keeps getting easier and easier."

In 2009, Sheehan set numerous school records in helping Bowling Green advance to its first bowl game since the 2007 season. His 4,051 yards, 375 completions, and 575 attempts all broke university marks. During a 36–35 win against Kent State, Sheehan passed for a school-record 505 yards, including the game-winning score with five seconds left. After the season, he was named Third Team All-MAC and the team's co-Most Valuable Player, along with receiver Freddie Barnes.

=== Statistics ===
Season	Team	Games			Passing								Rushing			
Season	Team	GP	GS	Record	Cmp	Att	Pct	Yds	Y/A	TD	Int	Rtg	Att	Yds	Avg	TD
2006	Bowling Green	4	0	—	23	43	53.5	192	4.5	0	4	72.4	13	-29	-2.2	0
2007	Bowling Green	13	13	8–5	303	476	63.7	3,264	6.9	23	11	132.6	93	148	1.6	3
2008	Bowling Green	12	12	6–6	267	400	66.8	2,610	6.5	20	9	133.6	105	237	2.3	7
2009	Bowling Green	13	13	7–6	373	575	64.9	4,051	7.0	27	7	137.1	73	-8	-0.1	4
Career		42	38	21–17	966	1,494	64.7	10,117	6.8	70	31	132.9	284	348	1.2	14

== Professional career ==
Pre-draft measurables
Height	Weight	40-yard dash	10-yard split	20-yard split	20-yard shuttle	Three-cone drill	Vertical jump	Broad jump
6 ft 3 1/2 in (1.92 m)	228 lb (103 kg)	5.05 s	1.70 s	2.94 s	4.49 s	7.43 s	28.0 in (0.71 m)	8 ft 9 in (2.67 m)
All values from Pro Day

=== Houston Texans ===
Sheehan signed as an undrafted free agent with the Houston Texans on April 24, 2010.

=== Cincinnati Commandos ===
He played for the Cincinnati Commandos of the CIFL from 2011 to 2012. In his first game, he was named starting quarterback, and was 11 of 20 for 135 yards and two touchdowns, in only one half of play before giving way in the 2nd half to quarterback Ben Mauk. On March 19, 2011, Sheehan threw for a Commandos record 8 touchdown passes against the Indianapolis Enforcers; Passing the mark of 7, set my Mauk, twice, in 2010. Sheehan went on to lead the Commandos to a 10–0 regular season record, earning himself the MVP of the regular season and Offensive Player of the Year, throwing 37 touchdowns, and running in another 7 more. Sheehan continued his dominance in the playoffs, by winning both games, clinching a 2nd consecutive CIFL Championship for the Commandos. Sheehan went on to win the CIFL Championship Game MVP award by throwing for 3 touchdowns and running in another, during the Commandos 44–29 victory.

=== Arizona Rattlers ===
On July 13, 2011, it was announced that Sheehan had reached an agreement to join the Arizona Rattlers of the Arena Football League.

== Career statistics ==
=== Regular season ===
Year	Team	League	Games			Passing								Rushing			
Year	Team	League	GP	GS	Record	Cmp	Att	Pct	Yds	Y/A	TD	Int	Rtg	Att	Yds	Avg	TD
2011	CIN	CIFL	7	7	7–0	100	179	55.8	1,187	6.6	25	9	90.2	19	88	4.6	6

=== Postseason ===
Year	Team	League	Games			Passing								Rushing			
Year	Team	League	GP	GS	Record	Cmp	Att	Pct	Yds	Y/A	TD	Int	Rtg	Att	Yds	Avg	TD
2011	CIN	CIFL	2	2	2–0	25	46	54.4	287	6.2	12	0	138.6	4	36	9.0	1
2012	CIN	UIFL	Did not play due to injury														
Career			2	2	2–0	25	46	54.4	287	6.2	12	0	138.6	4	36	9.0	1

== See also ==
- List of Division I FBS passing yardage leaders
