= Victory Pickleball =

Pickleball venue in Loves Park, Illinois, US

- Interactive map of Victory Pickleball
- Former names: Victory Sports Complex
- Location: 7003 North Alpine Road; Loves Park, Illinois 61111
- Coordinates: 42.3247°N 89.0273°W
- Owner: Tim Ancona

Construction
- Opened: 2007

Victory Pickleball, formerly Victory Sports Complex, is a 54,000-square-foot (5,000 m^{2}) indoor pickleball facility in Loves Park, Illinois.

== History ==
Before its conversion to pickleball, the facility operated as a multipurpose sports venue. It hosted a Rockford Rampage indoor-soccer match against the Chicago Storm in February 2008 and hosted the Rampage's home opener in the Professional Arena Soccer League in November 2012. The site also hosted nonsporting events; the City of Loves Park approved a special-event permit for a concert there in 2017.

In 2023, Tim Ancona acquired the then-shuttered complex and invested about $3 million to renovate it as Victory Pickleball. The redevelopment created 15 indoor pickleball courts; the facility opened in September 2023.
