= 2011 Marion Blue Racers season =

- Owner: LaMonte Coleman
- General manager: LaMonte Coleman
- Head coach: Demetrius Ross (resigned April 7: 3–1 record); Ryan Terry (interim)
- Home stadium: Veterans Memorial Coliseum; 220 East Fairground Street; Marion, OH 43302

Results
- Record: 8–2
- League place: 2nd
- Playoffs: Lost CIFL Championship Game 29-44 (Cincinnati Commandos)

The 2011 Marion Blue Racers season was the first season for the Continental Indoor Football League (CIFL) franchise. They took over to fill the void in Marion, Ohio, after the Marion Mayhem folded the year before. The franchise couldn't have asked for a more exciting start than their first game on March 5, 2011. Marion entered the 4th quarter trailing 37–23 to the Port Huron Predators. They started their comeback by scoring a touchdown with 10:31 left in the game. Mike Tatum caught a nine-yard touchdown pass from Josh Harris and Tyler Lorenz added the extra point, cutting Port Huron's lead was cut to 37–30. With 3:27 left in the game, Harris ran in from three yards out to tie the game. The game-winning score came on an eight-yard run by Harris with 27 seconds to play. Port Huron quarterback Jim Roth was intercepted by Bryan Williams as time expired to secure the victory. On April 2, 2011, the Blue Racers set a CIFL record with 8 rushing touchdowns in a single game, against the Indianapolis Enforcers. After the Blue Racers got off to a 3–1 start, Demetrius Ross stepped down from his head coaching position, citing personal reasons. His defensive coordinator, Ryan Terry, took over as head coach, just 2 days before the Blue Racers played their first road game at the Dayton Silverbacks. The Blue Racers went on to an 8–2 regular season record, losing twice to the Cincinnati Commandos. The team defeated the Dayton Silverbacks 53–18 in the league semi-finals, before being defeated by the Commandos again in the 2011 CIFL Championship Game 44–29.

== Schedule ==
Week	Date	Opponent	Home/Away	Result
1		Bye	Week	
2	March 5	Port Huron Predators	Home	Won 44–37
3	March 12	Cincinnati Commandos	Home	Lost 44–50
4		Bye	Week	
5	March 26	Dayton Silverbacks	Home	Won 34–13
6	April 2	Indianapolis Enforcers	Home	Won 78–0
7	April 9	Dayton Silverbacks	Away	Won 31–14
8	April 16	Port Huron Predators	Away	Won 47–15
9		Bye	Week	
10	April 30	Chicago Knights	Home	Won 31–3
11		Bye	Week	
12	May 14	Indianapolis Enforcers	Home	Won 73–12
13	May 21	Chicago Knights	Away	Won 53–24
14	May 28	Cincinnati Commandos	Away	Lost 20–50
15		Bye	Week	

== Playoff schedule ==
Week	Date	Opponent	Home/Away	Result
Semifinals	June 6	Dayton Silverbacks	Home	Won 53–18
CIFL Championship Game	June 11	Cincinnati Commandos	Away	Lost 29–44

== Standings ==
2011 Continental Indoor Football League
Team	W	L	T	PCT	PF	PA	PF (Avg.)	PA (Avg.)	STK
Cincinnati Commandos-y	10	0	0	1.000	484	158	53.77	17.55	W10
Marion Blue Racers-x	8	2	0	.800	455	218	45.5	21.8	L1
Dayton Silverbacks-x	5	5	0	.500	288	265	32	39.4	W3
Chicago Knights-x	4	6	0	.400	255	295	28.33	32.77	L5
Port Huron Predators	2	8	0	.200	238	226	39.6	37.6	L7
Indianapolis Enforcers	1	9	0	.100	71	621	7.88	69	L3

== Final roster ==
2011 Marion Blue Racers roster
Quarterbacks: 5 Josh Harris; Running backs: 21 Christen Haywood; 25 Victor Tolbert; 6 Antonio Wells; Wide receivers: 23 Felix Adeyeye; 14 Marc Huddelston QB/WR; 10 Brandon Ikard; 1 Mike Tatum; 7 Brandon Williams	Offensive linemen: 70 Josh Baker; 95 Bishop Hills; 75 Robert Price; 77 Melvin Tuten OL/DL; Defensive linemen: 90 Marcus Allen; 34 Ryan Palmer; 32 Victor Rodriguez OL/DL; Linebackers: 11 Jared Dorn DL/LB; 33 Ray Saunders; 28 LaMarr Stewart	Defensive backs: 27 Lorenzo Best; 3 Mike Ellison; 4 Bryceson Lawrence; 2 Andre Troy; Kickers: 8 Tyler Lorenz	Inactive: 25 Janaid Abdulla LB/SS; 28 Jerard Bennett RB; 11 Trent Fannin TE/K; 23 Marvin Germany WR; 10 Kenny Gettis DB; 28 Raphiel Hughley WR; 77 Joseph Kyte OL; 95 Joe Long DL; 11 Anthonie Longo LB; 10 Monsanto Love DB; 9 Jason Marshall DB; 10 Marcus McIntosh DB; 15 Angel Soto QB; 77 Allen Sullivan OL; Injured reserve Updated 2011-05-07 rookies in italics 25 Active, 15 Inactive

== Regular season ==
=== Week 2: vs Port Huron Predators ===
Week 2: Port Huron Predators at Marion Blue Racers – Game summary

Quarter	1	2	3	4	Total
Predators	6	19	12	0	37
Blue Racers	7	13	3	21	44

at Veterans Memorial Coliseum, Marion, Ohio

- Date: March 5
- Game time: 7:30 p.m. EDT
- Game attendance: 1,200
- Referee: Les Anderson

Game information

1st quarter

- Marion - (4:45) Mike Tatum 8-yard pass from Josh Harris (Tyler Lorenz kick), Marion 7-0
- Port huron – (2:08) Jim Roth 7-yard rush (Rasko Apostolovski kick failed), Marion 7–6

2nd quarter

- Marion - (14:05) Christen Haywood 8-yard pass from Josh Harris (Tyler Lorenz kick failed), Marion 13-6
- Port Huron - (6:28) Devon Daniels 3-yard pass from Jim Roth (Rasko Apostolovski kick), 13-13
- Port Huron - (0:30) Levi Raines 3-yard rush (Rasko Apostolovski kick failed), Port Huron 19-13
- Marion - (0:16) Mike Tatum 6-yard pass from Josh Harris (Tyler Lorenz kick), Marion 20-19
- Port Huron - (0:04) Robert Height 7-yard pass from Jim Roth (Jim Roth pass failed), Port Huron 25-20

3rd quarter

- Port Huron - (5:40) Levi Raines 9-yard rush (Jim Roth pass failed), Port Huron 31-20
- Marion – (2:36) Tyler Lorenz 41-yard field goal, Port Huron 31-23
- Port Huron - (1:28) Levi Raines 19-yard rush (Jim Roth rush failed), Port Huron 37-23

4th quarter

- Marion - (10:54) Mike Tatum 9-yard pass from Josh Harris (Tyler Lorenz kick), Port Huron 37-30
- Marion - (3:23) Josh Harris 3-yard rush (Tyler Lorenz kick), 37-37
- Marion - (0:27) Josh Harris 12-yard rush (Tyler Lorenz kick), Marion 44-37

Passing

- Port huron – Jim Roth: 8/23, 74 yards, 2 TD
- Marion – Josh Harris: 7/12, 37 yards, 4 TD

Rushing

- Port huron – Levi Raines: 17 att, 127 yards, 3 TD
- Marion – Josh Harris: 11 att, 48 yards, 2 TD

Receiving

- Port huron – Robert Height: 4 rec, 41 yards, 1 TD
- Marion – Mike Tatum: 4 rec, 26 yards, 3 TD

=== Week 3: vs Cincinnati Commandos ===
Week 3: Cincinnati Commandos at Marion Blue Racers – Game summary

Quarter	1	2	3	4	Total
Commandos	6	24	7	13	50
Blue Racers	6	14	11	13	44

at Veterans Memorial Coliseum, Marion, Ohio

- Date: March 12
- Game time: 7:30 p.m. EDT
- Referee: Rick Jackson

Game information

1st quarter

- Marion - (11:34) Mike Tatum 14-yard pass from Josh Harris (Tyler Lorenz kick failed), Marion 6-0
- Cincinnati – (8:57) George Murray 12-yard pass from Tyler Sheehan (Justin McClain kick failed), 6–6

2nd quarter

- Cincinnati – (14:53) George Murray 3-yard pass from Tyler Sheehan (Justin McClain kick), Cincinnati 13–6
- Cincinnati - (10:33) Pernell Phillips safety, Cincinnati 15-6
- Cincinnati - (1:42) Greg Moore 4-yard rush (George Murray pass from Tyler Sheehan), Cincinnati 23-6
- Marion – (0:22) Josh Harris 1-yard rush (Tyler Lorenz kick blocked), Cincinnati 23–12
- Cincinnati - (0:02) George Murray 6-yard pass from Tyler Sheehan (Justin McClain kick), Cincinnati 30-12
- Marion – (0:00) Timothy Robinson 8-yard pass from Josh Harris (Josh Harris rush), Cincinnati 30–20

3rd quarter

- Cincinnati - (11:16) Jeff Franklin 0-yard blocked field goal return (Justin McClain kick), Cincinnati 37-20
- Marion – (10:58) Mike Tatum 44-yard kickoff return (Josh Harris rush), Cincinnati 37–28
- Marion – (3:43) Tyler Lorenz 20-yard field goal, Cincinnati 37-31

4th quarter

- Cincinnati - (13:56) Brandon Boehm 2-yard pass from Tyler Sheehan (Tyler Sheehan pass failed), Cincinnati 43-31
- Cincinnati - (12:09) Tyler Sheehan 3-yard rush (Justin McClain kick), Cincinnati 50-31
- Marion - (10:48) Mike Tatum 26-yard pass from Josh Harris (Tyler Lorenz kick), Cincinnati 50-38
- Marion - (0:51) Brandon Williams 9-yard pass from Josh Harris (Josh Harris pass failed), Cincinnati 50-44

Passing

- Cincinnati – Tyler Sheehan: 24/36, 237 yards, 4 TD
- Marion – Josh Harris: 12/22, 115 yards, 4 TD

Rushing

- Cincinnati – Greg Moore: 14 att, 55 yards, 1 TD
- Marion – Antonio Wells: 1 att, 4 yards, 0 TD

Receiving

- Cincinnati – Greg Moore: 6 rec, 72 yards, 0 TD
- Marion – Jerard Bennett: 4 rec, 31 yards, 0 TD

=== Week 5: vs Dayton Silverbacks ===
Week 5: Dayton Silverbacks at Marion Blue Racers – Game summary

Quarter	1	2	3	4	Total
Silverbacks	7	0	0	6	13
Blue Racers	13	18	3	0	34

at Veterans Memorial Coliseum, Marion, Ohio

- Date: March 26
- Game time: 7:30 p.m. EDT
- Game attendance: 1,300
- Referee: Rick Jackson

Game information

1st quarter

- Dayton – (10:15) Daniel Stover 34-yard pass from Bruce Jones (Jeff Hubbard kick), Dayton 7–0
- Marion – (7:32) Bryceson Lawrence 0-yard fumble recovery (Tyler Lorenz kick), 7–7
- Marion - (3:32) Mike Tatum 46-yard pass from Josh Harris (Tyler Lorenz kick blocked), Marion 13-7

2nd quarter

- Marion - (4:12) Christen Haywood 4-yard rush (Tyler Lorenz kick), Marion 20-7
- Marion - (1:23) Brandon Williams 38-yard pass from Josh Harris (Brandon Williams pass from Josh Harris), Marion 28-7
- Marion – (0:00) Tyler Lorenz 36-yard field goal, Marion 31–7

3rd quarter

- Marion – (13:00) Tyler Lorenz 43-yard field goal, Marion 34–7

4th quarter

- Dayton - (1:41) Melvin Bryant 14-yard pass from Daniel Stover (Victor Tolbert rush failed), Marion 34-13

Passing

- Dayton – Daniel Stover: 4/18, 35 yards, 1 TD
- Marion – Josh Harris: 12/21, 179 yards, 2 TD

Rushing

- Dayton – Daniel Stover: 9 att, 87 yards, 0 TD
- Marion – Christen Haywood: 5 att, 8 yards, 1 TD

Receiving

- Dayton – Melvin Bryant: 3 rec, 29 yards, 1 TD
- Marion – Antonio Wells: 4 rec, 53 yards, 0 TD

=== Week 6: vs Indianapolis Enforcers ===
Week 6: Indianapolis Enforcers at Marion Blue Racers – Game summary

Quarter	1	2	3	4	Total
Enforcers	0	0	0	0	0
Blue Racers	26	27	12	13	78

at Veterans Memorial Coliseum, Marion, Ohio

- Date: April 2
- Game time: 7:30 p.m. EDT
- Game attendance: 1,200
- Referee: Les Anderson

Game information

1st quarter

- Marion - (12:51) Christen Haywood 12-yard rush (Tyler Lorenz kick), Marion 7-0
- Marion - (8:30) Christen Haywood 4-yard rush (Tyler Lorenz kick), Marion 14-0
- Marion - (7:15) Ray Saunders 0-yard fumnble recovery (Tyler Lorenz kick failed), Marion 20-0
- Marion - (1:00) Bryceson Lawrence 35-yard fumnble recovery (Tyler Lorenz kick failed), Marion 26-0

2nd quarter

- Marion - (11:15) Timothy Robinson 8-yard rush (Tyler Lorenz kick), Marion 33-0
- Marion - (6:45) Lorenzo Best 21-yard rush (Tyler Lorenz kick), Marion 40-0
- Marion - (1:30) Antonio Wells 26-yard pass form Timothy Robinson (Tyler Lorenz kick), Marion 47-0
- Marion - (0:46) Ryan Palmer 0-yard fumnble recovery (Tyler Lorenz kick failed), Marion 53-0

3rd quarter

- Marion - (10:00) Jerard Bennett 12-yard rush (Tyler Lorenz kick failed), Marion 59-0
- Marion - (4:30) Christen Haywood 9-yard rush (Tyler Lorenz kick failed), Marion 65-0

4th quarter

- Marion - (13:15) Jerard Bennett 9-yard rush (Tyler Lorenz kick failed), Marion 71-0
- Marion - (10:27) Mike Ellison 22-yard interception return (Tyler Lorenz kick), Marion 78-0

Passing

- Indianapolis – Dean Vinson: 8/26, 40 yards, 0 TD
- Marion – Timothy Robinson: 1/1, 26 yards, 1 TD

Rushing

- Indianapolis – Dean Vinson: 3 att, 14 yards, 0 TD
- Marion – Christen Haywood: 10 att, 57 yards, 3 TD

Receiving

- Indianapolis – Troy Summers: 2 rec, 17 yards, 0 TD
- Marion – Antonio Wells: 1 rec, 26 yards, 1 TD

=== Week 7: vs Dayton Silverbacks ===
Week 7: Marion Blue Racers at Dayton Silverbacks – Game summary

Quarter	1	2	3	4	Total
Blue Racers	9	6	10	6	31
Silverbacks	7	0	7	0	14

at Hara Arena, Trotwood, Ohio

- Date: April 9
- Game time: 7:30 p.m. EDT
- Referee: Les Anderson

Game information

1st quarter

- Dayton – (14:49) Fred Cromartie 54-yard kickoff return (Jeff Hubbard kick), Dayton 7–0
- Marion – (8:09) Michael Cross safety, Dayton 7–2
- Marion - (5:50) Christen Haywood 2-yard rush (Tyler Lorenz kick), Marion 9-7

2nd quarter

- Marion - (0:05) Brandon Williams 14-yard pass from Josh Harris (Tyler Lorenz kick failed), Marion 15-7

3rd quarter

- Marion - (13:53) Brandon Williams 37-yard pass from Josh Harris (Tyler Lorenz kick), Marion 22-7
- Dayton - (11:44) Chris Stanford 1-yard rush (Jeff Hubbard kick), Marion 22-14
- Marion – (8:19) Tyler Lorenz 37-yard field goal, Marion 25–14

4th quarter

- Marion - (2:47) Josh Harris 9-yard rush (Tyler Lorenz kick failed), Marion 31-14

Passing

- Marion – Josh Harris: 13/21, 107 yards, 2 TD
- Dayton – Chris Stanford: 4/17, 43 yards, 0 TD

Rushing

- Marion – Josh Harris: 9 att, 47 yards, 1 TD
- Dayton – Chris Stanford: 6 att, 37 yards, 0 TD

Receiving

- Marion – Brandon Williams: 5 rec, 77 yards, 2 TD
- Dayton – Fred Cromartie: 2 rec, 7 yards, 0 TD

=== Week 8: vs Port Huron Predators ===
Week 8: Marion Blue Racers at Port Huron Predators – Game summary

Quarter	1	2	3	4	Total
Blue Racers	8	3	7	29	47
Predators	0	9	0	6	15

at McMorran Arena, Port Huron, Michigan

- Date: April 16
- Game time: 7:30 p.m. EDT
- Game attendance: 1,073
- Referee: Les Anderson

Game information

1st quarter

- Marion - (4:45) Mike Tatum 29-yard pass from Josh Harris (Tyler Lorenz kick), Marion 7-0
- Marion – (3:59) Victor Rodriguez rouge, Marion 8–0

2nd quarter

- Port Huron - (7:31) Robert Height 14-yard pass from Calvin Toliver (Ruben Gay pass failed), Marion 8-6
- Port Huron - (0:37) Chris Tatti 27-yard field goal, Port Huron 9-8
- Marion – (0:01) Tyler Lorenz 36-yard field goal, Marion 11-9

3rd quarter

- Marion - (4:49) Brandon Williams 31-yard pass from Josh Harris (B Ickard kick), Marion 18-9

4th quarter

- Marion - (14:53) Mike Tatum 18-yard rush (Tyler Lorenz kick), Marion 25-9
- Port Huron - (13:53) Ruben Gay 3-yard rush (Ruben Gay rush failed), Marion 25-15
- Marion - (12:58) Mike Tatum 45-yard kickoff return (Tyler Lorenz kick), Marion 32-15
- Marion - (9:05) Josh Harris 28-yard rush (Tyler Lorenz kick), 39-15
- Marion – (8:22) Lorenzo Best rouge, Marion 40–15
- Marion - (3:15) Brandon Williams 6-yard pass from Josh Harris (B Ickard kick), Marion 47-15

Passing

- Marion – Josh Harris: 7/18, 113 yards, 3 TD
- Port huron – Mike Akrawi: 4/11, 39 yards, 0 TD

Rushing

- Marion – Josh Harris: 2 att, 29 yards, 1 TD
- Port huron – Anthony Gay: 11 att, 30 yards, 0 TD

Receiving

- Marion – Brandon Williams: 5 rec, 76 yards, 2 TD
- Port huron – Devon Daniels: 4 rec, 56 yards, 0 TD

=== Week 10: vs Chicago Knights ===
Week 10: Chicago Knights at Marion Blue Racers – Game summary

Quarter	1	2	3	4	Total
Knights	3	0	0	0	3
Blue Racers	0	9	9	13	31

at Veterans Memorial Coliseum, Marion, Ohio

- Date: April 30
- Game time: 7:30 p.m. EDT
- Game attendance: 1,100
- Referee: Dave Stein

Game information

1st quarter

- Chicago – (10:40) Julie Harshbarger 28-yard field goal, Chicago 3-0

2nd quarter

- Marion - (14:45) Mike Tatum 6-yard pass from Josh Harris (Tyler Lorenz kick), Marion 7-3
- Marion – (0:00) Team Safety, Marion 9–3

3rd quarter

- Marion – (11:45) Team Safety, Marion 11–3
- Marion - (8:15) Mike Tatum 6-yard pass from Josh Harris (Tyler Lorenz kick), Marion 18-3

4th quarter

- Marion – (8:08) Marc Huddleston 5-yard rush (Tyler Lorenz kick), Marion 25–3
- Marion – (1:00) Christen Haywood 2-yard rush (Tyler Lorenz kick failed), Marion 31–3

Passing

- Chicago – Brandon Jewett: 13/27, 82 yards, 0 TD
- Marion – Josh Harris: 8/15, 67 yards, 2 TD

Rushing

- Chicago – Brandon Wogoman: 2 att, 7 yards, 0 TD
- Marion – Christen Haywood: 6 att, 44 yards, 1 TD

Receiving

- Chicago – Brandon Wogoman: 5 rec, 43 yards, 0 TD
- Marion – Christen Haywood: 2 rec, 20 yards, 0 TD

=== Week 12: vs Indianapolis Enforcers ===
Week 12: Indianapolis Enforcers at Marion Blue Racers – Game summary

Quarter	1	2	3	4	Total
Enforcers	6	6	0	0	12
Blue Racers	0	32	14	27	73

at Veterans Memorial Coliseum, Marion, Ohio

- Date: May 14
- Game time: 7:30 p.m. EDT
- Game attendance: 1,100
- Referee: Tommy Tyks

Game information

1st quarter

- Indianapolis - (10:00) Montez Williams 2-yard pass from DeMarcus Simons (Darnell Taylor rush failed), Indianapolis 6-0

2nd quarter

- Marion - (14:47) Christen Haywood 10-yard rush (Tyler Lorenz kick), Marion 7-6
- Marion - (14:16) Team Rouge, Marion 8-6
- Marion - (8:00) Tyler Lorenz 31-yard field goal, Marion 11-6
- Indianapolis - (5:00) Shannon Russell 29-yard pass from DeMarcus Simons (DeMarcus Simons pass failed), Indianapolis 12-11
- Marion - (2:25) Brandon Williams 4-yard pass from Josh Harris (Tyler Lorenz kick failed), Marion 17-12
- Marion - (1:00) Mike Tatum 32-yard pass from Josh Harris (Tyler Lorenz kick), Marion 24-12
- Marion - (0:10) Brandon Williams 26-yard pass form Josh Harris (Ryan Palmer pass form Mark Huddleston), Marion 32-12

3rd quarter

- Marion - (13:45) Mark Huddleston 4-yard rush (Tyler Lorenz kick), Marion 39-12
- Marion - (8:35) Mark Huddleston 35-yard pass form Josh Harris (Tyler Lorenz kick), Marion 46-12

4th quarter

- Marion - (14:15) Mike Tatum 41-yard pass from Josh Harris (Tyler Lorenz kick), Marion 53-12
- Marion - (8:41) Mark Huddleston 18-yard rush (Tyler Lorenz kick), Marion 60-12
- Marion - (5:30) J Dorn 28-yard fumble recovery (Tyler Lorenz kick), Marion 67-12
- Marion - (0:00) Victor Tolbert 32-yard rush (None Attempted), Marion 73-12

Passing

- Indianapolis – DeMarcus Simons: 13/20, 108 yards, 2 TD
- Marion – Josh Harris: 7/11, 140 yards, 5 TD

Rushing

- Indianapolis – DeMarcus Simons: 12 att, 51 yards, 0 TD
- Marion – Victor Tolbert: 2 att, 38 yards, 1 TD

Receiving

- Indianapolis – Shannon Russell: 4 rec, 41 yards, 1 TD
- Marion – Mike Tatum: 3 rec, 76 yards, 2 TD

=== Week 13: vs Chicago Knights ===
Week 13: Marion Blue Racers at Chicago Knights – Game summary

Quarter	1	2	3	4	Total
Blue Racers	13	10	14	16	53
Knights	6	0	6	12	24

at Victory Sports Complex, Loves Park, Illinois

- Date: May 22
- Game time: 7:30 p.m. CDT
- Game attendance: 75
- Referee: Jim Bernardi

Game information

1st quarter

- Chicago - (9:07) Willie Tolon 28-yard pass from Brandon Jewett (Julie Harshbarger kick failed), Chicago 6-0
- Marion - (4:34) Robert Price 2-yard rush (Tyler Lorenz kick blocked), 6-6
- Marion - (0:00) Mark Huddleston 8-yard pass from Mike Tatum (Tyler Lorenz kick), Marion 13-6

2nd quarter

- Marion - (5:39) Josh Harris 1-yard rush (Tyler Lorenz kick), Marion 20-6
- Marion - (0:00) Tyler Lorenz 24-yard field goal, Marion 23-6

3rd quarter

- Marion - (14:18) Brandon Williams 25-yard pass form Josh Harris (Tyler Lorenz kick), Marion 30-6
- Marion - (2:40) Josh Harris 6-yard rush (Tyler Lorenz kick), Marion 37-6
- Chicago - (1:07) Zontavius Johnson 15-yard pass from Brandon Jewett (Willie Tolon pass failed), Marion 37-12

4th quarter

- Marion - (12:33) Josh Harris 3-yard rush (Tyler Lorenz kick), Marion 44-12
- Chicago - (9:12) Dante Washington 4-yard rush (Brandon Jewett pass intercepted), Marion 44-18
- Marion - (9:12) J Dorn returned PAT, Marion 46-18
- Marion - (6:43) Bishop Hills 8-yard pass from Marc Huddelston (Tyler Lorenz kick), Marion 53-18
- Chicago - (4:02) Shawn McKeown 13-yard pass from Brandon Jewett (Brandon Jewett pass failed), Marion 53-24

Passing

- Marion – Josh Harris: 3/7, 43 yards, 1 TD
- Chicago – Brandon Jewett: 15/30, 135 yards, 3 TD

Rushing

- Marion – Josh Harris: 5 att, 21 yards, 3 TD
- Chicago – Dante Washington: 3 att, 8 yards, 1 TD

Receiving

- Marion – Christen Haywood: 2 rec, 36 yards, 0 TD
- Chicago – Neil Wilcox: 5 rec, 32 yards, 0 TD

=== Week 14: vs Cincinnati Commandos ===
Week 14: Marion Blue Racers at Cincinnati Commandos – Game summary

Quarter	1	2	3	4	Total
Blue Racers	0	7	6	7	20
Commandos	13	10	0	27	50

at Cincinnati Gardens, Cincinnati, Ohio

- Date: May 28
- Game time: 7:30 p.m. EDT
- Referee: Tommy Tyks

Game information

1st quarter

- Cincinnati – (10:24) Kyenes Mincy 16-yard pass from Tyler Sheehan (Brandon Boehm rush failed), Cincinnati 6–0
- Cincinnati – (1:21) Phillip Barnett 7-yard pass from Tyler Sheehan (Brandon Yingling kick), Cincinnati 13–0

2nd quarter

- Cincinnati – (3:01) Brandon Yingling 28-yard field goal, Cincinnati 16-0
- Marion – (0:53) Josh Harris 1-yard rush (Tyler Lorenz kick), Cincinnati 16–7
- Cincinnati - (0:27) Derrick Moss 4-yard rush (Brandon Yingling kick), Cincinnati 23-7

3rd quarter

- Marion – (7:40) Josh Harris 5-yard rush (Tyler Lorenz kick blocked), Cincinnati 23–13

4th quarter

- Cincinnati - (13:03) Tyler Sheehan 3-yard rush (Brandon Yingling kick), Cincinnati 30-13
- Marion - (10:40) Marc Huddelston 14-yard pass from Josh Harris (Tyler Lorenz kick), Cincinnati 30-20
- Cincinnati - (8:12) Derrick Moss 23-yard pass from Tyler Sheehan (Brandon Yingling kick), Cincinnati 37-20
- Cincinnati - (4:23) Terrill Byrd 15-yard fumble recovery (Brandon Yingling kick), Cincinnati 44-20
- Cincinnati – (0:00) Phillip Barnett 22-yard pass from Tyler Sheehan (None Attempted), Cincinnati 50–20

Passing

- Marion – Josh Harris: 10/18, 64 yards, 1 TD
- Cincinnati – Tyler Sheehan: 14/27, 157 yards, 4 TD

Rushing

- Marion – Josh Harris: 10 att, 37 yards, 2 TD
- Cincinnati – Derrick Moss: 8 att, 38 yards, 1 TD

Receiving

- Marion – Marc Huddelston: 3 rec, 25 yards, 1 TD
- Cincinnati – George Murray: 7 rec, 61 yards, 0 TD

== Playoffs ==
=== 2 vs 3 Semifinal vs Dayton Silverbacks ===
2 vs 3 Semifinal: Dayton Silverbacks at Marion Blue Racers – Game summary

Quarter	1	2	3	4	Total
Silverbacks	0	0	6	12	18
Blue Racers	9	7	14	23	53

at Veterans Memorial Coliseum, Marion, Ohio

- Date: June 6
- Game time: 7:35 p.m. EDT
- Game attendance: 1,300
- Referee: Rick Jackson

Game information

1st quarter

- Marion – (1:49) Bishop Mills safety, Marion 2–0
- Marion - (0:54) Christen Haywood 2-yard rush (Tyler Lorenz kick), Marion 9-0

2nd quarter

- Marion - (4:49) Christen Haywood 2-yard rush (Tyler Lorenz kick), Marion 16-0

3rd quarter

- Marion - (9:26) Mike Tatum 1-yard rush (Tyler Lorenz kick), Marion 23-0
- Marion - (3:13) Josh Harris 5-yard rush (Tyler Lorenz kick), Marion 30-0
- Dayton - (0:22) Daniel Stover 10-yard pass from Jarvis Taylor (Jarvis Taylor pass failed), Marion 30-6

4th quarter

- Marion - (10:41) Marc Huddelston 17-yard pass from Josh Harris (Tyler Lorenz kick), Marion 37-6
- Dayton - (5:31) Ronald Russell 1-yard rush (Jarvis Taylor rush failed), Marion 37-12
- Marion - (1:14) LaMarr Stewart 0-yard fumble recovery (Tyler Lorenz kick), Marion 44-12
- Dayton - (0:49) Daniel Stover 5-yard pass from Jarvis Taylor (Victor Jett rush failed), Marion 44-18
- Marion – (0:22) Brandon Williams 6-yard pass from Josh Harris (Tyler Lorenz kick), Marion 51–18
- Marion – (0:07) Jared Dorn safety, Marion 53–18

Passing

- Dayton – Jarvis Taylor: 7/17, 62 yards, 2 TD
- Marion – Josh Harris: 5/11, 48 yards, 2 TD

Rushing

- Dayton – Jarvis Taylor: 12 att, 20 yards, 0 TD
- Marion – Mike Tatum: 5 att, 21 yards, 1 TD

Receiving

- Dayton – Daniel Stover: 4 rec, 32 yards, 2 TD
- Marion – Mike Tatum: 2 rec, 29 yards, 0 TD

=== 2011 CIFL Championship Game: vs. Cincinnati Commandos ===
2011 CIFL Championship Game: Marion Blue Racers at Cincinnati Commandos – Game summary

Quarter	1	2	3	4	Total
Blue Racers	0	13	3	13	29
Commandos	7	14	13	10	44

at Cincinnati Gardens, Cincinnati, Ohio

- Date: June 11
- Game time: 7:30 p.m. EDT

Game information

1st quarter

- Cincinnati - (6:17) Tyler Sheehan 1-yard rush, (Brandon Yingling kick), Cincinnati 7-0

2nd quarter

- Cincinnati - (12:57) Kyenes Mincy 9-yard pass from Tyler Sheehan (Brandon Yingling kick), Cincinnati 14-0
- Cincinnati - (6:15) James Frazier 49-yard fumble recovery (Brandon Yingling kick), Cincinnati 21-0
- Marion - (2:04) Christen Haywood 30-yard rush, (Tyler Lorenz kick), Cincinnati 21-7
- Marion - (0:00) Brandon Williams 3-yard pass from Josh Harris, (Tyler Lorenz kick failed), Cincinnati 21-13

3rd quarter

- Cincinnati - (11:19) George Murrey 6-yard pass from Tyler Sheehan (Brandon Yingling kick), Cincinnati 28-13
- Marion - (5:07) Tyler Lorenz 43-yard field goal, Cincinnati 28-16
- Cincinnati - (2:47) Greg Moore 2-yard rush, (Brandon Yingling kick failed), Cincinnati 34-16

4th quarter

- Marion - (12:37) Christen Haywood 1-yard rush, (Tyler Lorenz kick), Cincinnati 34-23
- Cincinnati - (7:45) Brandon Boehm 19-yard pass from Tyler Sheehan (Brandon Yingling kick), Cincinnati 41-23
- Marion - (4:14) Brandon Williams 3-yard pass from Josh Harris, (Christen Haywood rush failed), Cincinnati 41-29
- Cincinnati - (0:48) Brandon Yingling 33-yard field goal, Cincinnati 44-29

Passing

- Marion – Josh Harris: 4/14, 15 yards, 2 TD
- Cincinnati – Tyler Sheehan: 8/19, 93 yards, 3 TD

Rushing

- Marion – Christen Haywood: 18 att, 107 yards, 2 TD
- Cincinnati – Tyler Sheehan: 2 att, 28 yards, 1 TD

Receiving

- Marion – Brandon Williams: 2 rec, 6 yards, 2 TD
- Cincinnati – Brandon Boehm: 2 rec, 36 yards, 1 TD
