= Melvin Tuten =

American football player and coach (born 1971)

No. 77, 61, 71, 73
- Position: Offensive lineman

Personal information
- Born: November 11, 1971 (age 54); Washington, DC, U.S.
- Listed height: 6 ft 7 in (2.01 m)
- Listed weight: 320 lb (145 kg)

Career information
- High school: Washington (DC) Wilson
- College: Syracuse
- NFL draft: 1995: 3rd round, 69th overall pick

Career history

Playing
- Cincinnati Bengals (1995–1996); Barcelona Dragons (1999); Denver Broncos (1999–2000); Carolina Panthers (2000–2003); Marion Blue Racers (2011)

Coaching
- Marion Blue Racers (2011–2012) Offensive line coach

Career NFL statistics
- Games played: 66
- Games started: 17
- Touchdowns: 1
- Stats at Pro Football Reference

Melvin Eugene Tuten, Jr. (born November 11, 1971) is an American former professional football player who was an offensive lineman in the National Football League, and Continental Indoor Football League. After his playing career, he was an offensive line coach for the Marion Blue Racers of the Continental Indoor Football League.

== Early life ==
He attended Woodrow Wilson High School in Washington D.C. where he lettered in football and basketball.

== College career ==
He played college football for the Syracuse Orange where he was a tight end and lettered 3 times. During his senior year, he played for the 1994-1995 Syracuse Basketball team, playing in 4 games as a forward. He scored a total of 7 points and had 1 rebound.

== Professional career ==
=== Cincinnati Bengals ===
He was selected by the Cincinnati Bengals in the third round of the 1995 NFL draft. During his rookie season, he did see some action at tight end, where he caught 2 passes for 12 yards and 1 touchdown. Games Played 32 Starts 9

=== Denver Broncos ===
In 1999, he signed with the Denver Broncos after 2 years off. He was released Games Played 2 Starts 0

=== Carolina Panthers ===
In 2000, he signed with the Carolina Panthers. He recovered the only fumble of his career while starting at right tackle in 2002. He was placed on the IR in 2003 with a knee injury, effectively ending his NFL career. Games Played 32 Starts 8

=== Marion Blue Racers ===
After several injuries, and lack of talented linemen, Tuten suited up for the final 4 games for the Blue Racers, who play in the Continental Indoor Football League. He started both of the team's playoff games., who finished the regular season 8-2 and lost the CIFL Championship Game to the Cincinnati Commandosa

== Coaching career ==
He has helped out at Midwest Lineman Camp at Illinois Wesleyan

=== Marion Blue Racers ===
He was named the lineman coach for the Marion Blue Racers for the 2011 season, and will return again in 2012
