= 2011 Continental Indoor Football League season =

2011 CIFL season
- League: Continental Indoor Football League
- Sport: Indoor Football
- Duration: February 26, 2011 – June 11, 2011

Regular season
- Season champions: Cincinnati Commandos
- Season MVP: Tyler Sheehan

League postseason
- 1 vs 4 Semifinals champions: Cincinnati Commandos
- 1 vs 4 Semifinals runners-up: Chicago Knights
- 2 vs 3 Semifinals champions: Marion Blue Racers
- 2 vs 3 Semifinals runners-up: Dayton Silverbacks

CIFL Championship Game
- Champions: Cincinnati Commandos
- Runners-up: Marion Blue Racers
- Finals MVP: Tyler Sheehan (CIN)

CIFL seasons
- ← 2010 2012 →

The 2011 Continental Indoor Football League season was the league's sixth overall season. The regular season started on Saturday, February 26, with the expansion Port Huron Predators defeating the expansion Indianapolis Enforcers 69-12, and ended with the 2011 CIFL Championship Game on June 11, 2011, at the Cincinnati Gardens in Cincinnati, Ohio, where the Cincinnati Commandos defeated the Marion Blue Racers 44-29 to clinch their second consecutive CIFL Championship.

In 2011, the league saw its size stay the same for the first time. There were changes to the teams that made up the 6 teams, as Fort Wayne FireHawks, Marion Mayhem and the Wisconsin Wolfpack folded following the 2010 season, and the Chicago Cardinals changed their name to the Chicago Knights, and the Miami Valley Silverbacks established a home arena in Dayton, Ohio and changed their names to the Dayton Silverbacks. The CIFL awarded the Indianapolis Enforcers, the Marion Blue Racers and the Port Huron Predators expansion franchises.

On April 29, 2011 it was announced that the Port Huron Predators would ceased operations immediately. This made the league finish with 5 teams for a second consecutive season.

== Schedule ==
Since the league remained at 6 teams, they stuck to their ten-game schedule for each team. Every team was scheduled to play a home and away game with every team except Indianapolis, as they were competing as a travel team.

=== Scheduling changes ===
On April 29, 2011 it was announced that the Port Huron Predators would ceased operations immediately As a result of Port Huron folding Chicago, Cincinnati, Dayton, and Indianapolis were awarded wins for their remaining games against Port Huron.

== Regular season standings ==
2011 Continental Indoor Football League
Team	W	L	T	PCT	PF	PA	PF (Avg.)	PA (Avg.)	STK
Cincinnati Commandos-y	10	0	0	1.000	484	158	53.77	17.55	W10
Marion Blue Racers-x	8	2	0	.800	455	218	45.5	21.8	L1
Dayton Silverbacks-x	5	5	0	.500	288	265	32	39.4	W3
Chicago Knights-x	4	6	0	.400	255	295	28.33	32.77	L5
Port Huron Predators	2	8	0	.200	238	226	39.6	37.6	L7
Indianapolis Enforcers	1	9	0	.100	71	621	7.88	69	L3

y - clinched regular-season title

x - clinched playoff spot

=== Week 1 ===
==== Indianapolis at Port Huron ====
Week 1: Indianapolis Enforcers at Port Huron Predators – Game summary

Quarter	1	2	3	4	Total
Enforcers	0	6	0	6	12
Predators	7	14	26	22	69

at McMorran Arena, Port Huron, Michigan

- Date: February 26
- Game time: 7:30 p.m. EDT
- Game attendance: 1,931

Game information

1st quarter

- Port Huron – (13:28) Robert Height 13-yard pass from Jim Roth (Rasko Apostolvski kick), Port Huron 7–0

2nd quarter

- Port Huron - (13:23) Levi Raines 11-yard rush (Rasko Apostovlski kick), Port Huron 14-0
- Indianapolis - (6:28) Montez Williams 10-yard pass from Mike Whitaker (Ian Pocurro rush failed), Port Huron 14-6
- Port Huron – (4:26) Robert Height 12-yard rush (Rasko Apostovlski kick), Port Huron 21–6

3rd quarter

- Port Huron - (13:26) Levi Raines 11-yard pass from Jim Roth (Rasko Apostovlski kick), Port Huron 28-6
- Port Huron - (7:16) Levi Raines 5-yard rush (Rasko Apostovlski kick failed), Port Huron 34-6
- Port Huron - (5:46) Anthony Calamita 10-yard interception return (Rasko Apostovlski kick), Port Huron 41-6
- Port Huron – (0:43) Robert Height 15-yard rush (Ruben Gay rush failed), Port Huron 47–6

4th quarter

- Port Huron – (8:40) Anthony Gay 49-yard rush (Rasko Apostovlski kick), Port Huron 54–6
- Indianapolis - (6:43) Montez Williams 24-yard pass from Mike Whitaker (Troy Summers rush failed), Port Huron 54-12
- Port Huron – (4:53) Justin McKinny 25-yard kickoff return (Rasko Apostovlski kick), Port Huron 61–12
- Port Huron – (2:13) Andre Raines 0-yard fumble recovery (Rasko Apostovlski kick), Port Huron 68–12
- Port Huron – (1:27) Team Rouge, Port Huron 69–12

Passing

- Indianapolis – Mike Whitaker: 15/34, 73 yards, 2 TD
- Port Huron – Jim Roth: 4/8, 60 yards, 2 TD

Rushing

- Indianapolis – Troy Summers: 2 att, 23 yards, 0 TD
- Port Huron – Levi Raines: 7 att, 78 yards, 2 TD

Receiving

- Indianapolis – Montez Williams: 6 rec, 51 yards, 2 TD
- Port Huron – Ernie Smith: 1 rec, 23 yards, 0 TD

=== Week 2 ===
==== Chicago at Cincinnati ====
Week 2: Chicago Knights at Cincinnati Commandos – Game summary

Quarter	1	2	3	4	Total
Knights	0	7	0	0	7
Commandos	13	14	6	20	53

at Cincinnati Gardens, Cincinnati, Ohio

- Date: March 5
- Game time: 7:30 p.m. EDT
- Game attendance: 2,643

Game information

1st quarter

- Cincinnati – (12:02) George Murray 14-yard pass from Tyler Sheehan (Brandon Yingling kick), Cincinnati 7–0
- Cincinnati - (8:40) Greg Moore 1-yard rush (Brandon Yingling kick failed), Cincinnati 13-0

2nd quarter

- Cincinnati - (14:50) George Murray 27-yard pass from Tyler Sheehan (George Murray pass from Tyler Sheehan), Cincinnati 21-0
- Chicago - (4:07) Rick Lahrman 23-yard pass from Ron Ricciardi (Tony Smidl kick), Cincinnati 21-7
- Cincinnati - (0:16) Tyler Sheehan 1-yard rush (Brandon Yingling kick failed), Cincinnati 27-7

3rd quarter

- Cincinnati - (2:52) Brandon Boehm 21-yard pass from Ben Mauk (Brandon Boehm pass failed), Cincinnati 33-7

4th quarter

- Cincinnati - (11:05) Kyenes Mincy 13-yard pass from Ben Mauk (Ben Mauk pass failed), Cincinnati 39-7
- Cincinnati - (5:35) Moe Lee 5-yard pass from Ben Mauk (David Wess rush), Cincinnati 47-7
- Cincinnati - (0:50) Kyenes Mincy 1-yard pass from Ben Mauk (Brandon Yingling kick failed), Cincinnati 53-7

Passing

- Chicago – Ron Ricciardi: 5/13, 43 yards, 1 TD
- Cincinnati – Tyler Sheehan: 11/20, 135 yards, 2 TD

Rushing

- Chicago – Ryan Robinson: 10 att, 20 yards, 0 TD
- Cincinnati – Greg Moore: 9 att, 24 yards, 1 TD

Receiving

- Chicago – Rick Lahrman: 2 rec, 29 yards, 1 TD
- Cincinnati – Kyenes Mincy: 6 rec, 64 yards, 2 TD

==== Port Huron at Marion ====
Week 2: Port Huron Predators at Marion Blue Racers – Game summary

Quarter	1	2	3	4	Total
Predators	6	19	12	0	37
Blue Racers	7	13	3	21	44

at Veterans Memorial Coliseum, Marion, Ohio

- Date: March 5
- Game time: 7:30 p.m. EDT
- Game attendance: 1,200
- Referee: Les Anderson

Game information

1st quarter

- Marion - (4:45) Mike Tatum 8-yard pass from Josh Harris (Tyler Lorenz kick), Marion 7-0
- Port Huron – (2:08) Jim Roth 7-yard rush (Rasko Apostolovski kick failed), Marion 7–6

2nd quarter

- Marion - (14:05) Christen Haywood 8-yard pass from Josh Harris (Tyler Lorenz kick failed), Marion 13-6
- Port Huron - (6:28) Devon Daniels 3-yard pass from Jim Roth (Rasko Apostolovski kick), 13-13
- Port Huron - (0:30) Levi Raines 3-yard rush (Rasko Apostolovski kick failed), Port Huron 19-13
- Marion - (0:16) Mike Tatum 6-yard pass from Josh Harris (Tyler Lorenz kick), Marion 20-19
- Port Huron - (0:04) Robert Height 7-yard pass from Jim Roth (Jim Roth pass failed), Port Huron 25-20

3rd quarter

- Port Huron - (5:40) Levi Raines 9-yard rush (Jim Roth pass failed), Port Huron 31-20
- Marion – (2:36) Tyler Lorenz 41-yard field goal, Port Huron 31-23
- Port Huron - (1:28) Levi Raines 19-yard rush (Jim Roth rush failed), Port Huron 37-23

4th quarter

- Marion - (10:54) Mike Tatum 9-yard pass from Josh Harris (Tyler Lorenz kick), Port Huron 37-30
- Marion - (3:23) Josh Harris 3-yard rush (Tyler Lorenz kick), 37-37
- Marion - (0:27) Josh Harris 12-yard rush (Tyler Lorenz kick), Marion 44-37

Passing

- Port Huron – Jim Roth: 8/23, 74 yards, 2 TD
- Marion – Josh Harris: 7/12, 37 yards, 4 TD

Rushing

- Port Huron – Levi Raines: 17 att, 127 yards, 3 TD
- Marion – Josh Harris: 11 att, 48 yards, 2 TD

Receiving

- Port Huron – Robert Height: 4 rec, 41 yards, 1 TD
- Marion – Mike Tatum: 4 rec, 26 yards, 3 TD

==== Indianapolis at Dayton ====
Week 2: Indianapolis Enforcers at Dayton Silverbacks – Game summary

Quarter	1	2	3	4	Total
Enforcers	6	7	0	6	19
Silverbacks	23	27	3	16	69

at Hara Arena, Trotwood, Ohio

- Date: March 5
- Game time: 7:30 p.m. EDT

Game information

1st quarter

- Dayton – (13:20) Melvin Bryant 45-yard pass from Jeremy Greenleaf (Jeff Hubbard kick), Dayton 7–0
- Dayton – (7:51) Fred Cromartie 27-yard pass from Jeremy Greenleaf (Jeff Hubbard kick), Dayton 14–0
- Dayton - (1:14) Daniel Stover 37-yard pass from Jeremy Greenleaf (Jeff Hubbard kick), Dayton 21-0
- Indianapolis - (0:00) Troy Summers 26-yard pass from Mike Whitaker (Scott Duvall kick blocked), Dayton 21-6
- Dayton - (0:00) Donavan Evans PAT return, Dayton 23-6

2nd quarter

- Dayton - (14:20) Victor Jett Jr. 37-yard kickoff return (Jeff Hubbard kick blocked), Dayton 29-6
- Indianapolis - (10:46) Ricky Emery 2-yard rush (Scott Duvall kick), Dayton 29-13
- Dayton – (7:03) Melvin Bryant 32-yard pass from Bruce Jones (Jeff Hubbard kick), Dayton 36–13
- Dayton – (3:12) Ronald Russell 1-yard rush (Jeff Hubbard kick), Dayton 43–13
- Dayton - (0:04) Daniel Stover 6-yard pass from Jeremy Greenleaf (Jeff Hubbard kick), Dayton 50-13

3rd quarter

- Dayton – (9:16) Jeff Hubbard 28-yard field goal, Dayton 53–13

4th quarter

- Dayton – (12:50) Jeff Hubbard 28-yard field goal, Dayton 56–13
- Dayton - (6:59) Marcus Fails 12-yard rush (Jeff Hubbard kick), Dayton 63-13
- Indianapolis - (1:22) Ricky Emery 5-yard pass from Mike Whitaker (DeRon Jenkins rush failed), Dayton 63-19
- Dayton - (0:00) Daniel Stover 22-yard pass from Bruce Jones (none attempted), Dayton 69-19

Passing

- Indianapolis – Mike Whitaker: 12/24, 106 yards, 2 TD
- Dayton – Jeremy Greenleaf: 10/18, 177 yards, 4 TD

Rushing

- Indianapolis – DeRon Jenkins: 2 att, 9 yards, 0 TD
- Dayton – Jeremy Greenleaf: 2 att, 16 yards, 0 TD

Receiving

- Indianapolis – Montez Williams: 4 rec, 31 yards, 0 TD
- Dayton – Melvin Bryant: 5 rec, 117 yards, 2 TD

=== Week 3 ===
==== Cincinnati at Marion ====
Week 3: Cincinnati Commandos at Marion Blue Racers – Game summary

Quarter	1	2	3	4	Total
Commandos	6	24	7	13	50
Blue Racers	6	14	11	13	44

at Veterans Memorial Coliseum, Marion, Ohio

- Date: March 12
- Game time: 7:30 p.m. EDT

Game information

1st quarter

- Marion - (11:34) Mike Tatum 14-yard pass from Josh Harris (Tyler Lorenz kick failed), Marion 6-0
- Cincinnati – (8:57) George Murray 12-yard pass from Tyler Sheehan (Justin McClain kick failed), 6–6

2nd quarter

- Cincinnati – (14:53) George Murray 3-yard pass from Tyler Sheehan (Justin McClain kick), Cincinnati 13–6
- Cincinnati - (10:33) Pernell Phillips safety, Cincinnati 15-6
- Cincinnati - (1:42) Greg Moore 4-yard rush (George Murray pass from Tyler Sheehan), Cincinnati 23-6
- Marion – (0:22) Josh Harris 1-yard rush (Tyler Lorenz kick blocked), Cincinnati 23–12
- Cincinnati - (0:02) George Murray 6-yard pass from Tyler Sheehan (Justin McClain kick), Cincinnati 30-12
- Marion – (0:00) Timothy Robinson 8-yard pass from Josh Harris (Josh Harris rush), Cincinnati 30–20

3rd quarter

- Cincinnati - (11:16) Jeff Franklin 0-yard blocked field goal return (Justin McClain kick), Cincinnati 37-20
- Marion – (10:58) Mike Tatum 44-yard kickoff return (Josh Harris rush), Cincinnati 37–28
- Marion – (3:43) Tyler Lorenz 20-yard field goal, Cincinnati 37-31

4th quarter

- Cincinnati - (13:56) Brandon Boehm 2-yard pass from Tyler Sheehan (Tyler Sheehan pass failed), Cincinnati 43-31
- Cincinnati - (12:09) Tyler Sheehan 3-yard rush (Justin McClain kick), Cincinnati 50-31
- Marion - (10:48) Mike Tatum 26-yard pass from Josh Harris (Tyler Lorenz kick), Cincinnati 50-38
- Marion - (0:51) Brandon Williams 9-yard pass from Josh Harris (Josh Harris pass failed), Cincinnati 50-44

Passing

- Cincinnati – Tyler Sheehan: 24/36, 237 yards, 4 TD
- Marion – Josh Harris: 12/22, 115 yards, 4 TD

Rushing

- Cincinnati – Greg Moore: 14 att, 55 yards, 1 TD
- Marion – Antonio Wells: 1 att, 4 yards, 0 TD

Receiving

- Cincinnati – Greg Moore: 6 rec, 72 yards, 0 TD
- Marion – Jerard Bennett: 4 rec, 31 yards, 0 TD

=== Week 4 ===
==== Indianapolis at Cincinnati ====
Week 4: Indianapolis Enforcers at Cincinnati Commandos – Game summary

Quarter	1	2	3	4	Total
Enforcers	0	2	0	0	2
Commandos	26	20	16	20	82

at Cincinnati Gardens, Cincinnati, Ohio

- Date: March 19
- Game time: 7:30 p.m. EDT

Game information

1st quarter

- Cincinnati - (14:50) Moe Lee 25-yard pass from Tyler Sheehan (Justin McClain kick failed), Cincinnati 6-0
- Cincinnati – (11:51) Jeff Franklin 33-yard interception return (Justin McClain kick failed), Cincinnati 12–0
- Cincinnati - (7:32) Kyenes Mincy 27-yard pass from Tyler Sheehan (Tyler Sheehan pass failed), Cincinnati 18-0
- Cincinnati - (1:41) Brandon Boehm 28-yard pass from Tyler Sheehan (Derrick Moss rush), Cincinnati 26-0

2nd quarter

- Cincinnati - (12:02) Moe Lee 31-yard pass from Tyler Sheehan (Charles Hawkins pass from Tyler Sheehan), Cincinnati 34-0
- Cincinnati - (2:17) Brandon Boehm 25-yard pass from Tyler Sheehan (Justin McClain rush fumbled), Cincinnati 40-0
- Indianapolis - (2:17) Drew Russ PAT return, Cincinnati 40-2
- Cincinnati - (0:02) Thomas Claggett 0-yard fumble recovery (Tyler Sheehan pass failed), Cincinnati 46-2

3rd quarter

- Cincinnati - (10:36) Keith Brooks 2-yard rush (Keith Brooks pass from Tyler Sheehan), Cincinnati 54-2
- Cincinnati - (2:14) Brandon Boehm 21-yard pass from Tyler Sheehan (James Frazier rush), Cincinnati 62-2

4th quarter

- Cincinnati - (4:28) David Wess 13-yard fumble recovery (Frank Straub pass from Tyler Sheehan), Cincinnati 70-2
- Cincinnati - (0:24) Kyenes Mincy 19-yard pass from Tyler Sheehan (James Fraizer rush failed), Cincinnati 76-2
- Cincinnati - (0:02) Kyenes Mincy 2-yard pass from Tyler Sheehan (Keith Brooks rush failed), Cincinnati 82-2

Passing

- Indianapolis – Mike Whitaker: 7/24, 66 yards, 0 TD
- Cincinnati – Tyler Sheehan: 21/31, 289 yards, 8 TD

Rushing

- Indianapolis – DeRon Jenkins: 1 att, 3 yards, 0 TD
- Cincinnati – Keith Brooks: 4 att, 8 yards, 1 TD

Receiving

- Indianapolis – Montez Williams: 4 rec, 30 yards, 0 TD
- Cincinnati – Moe Lee: 6 rec, 108 yards, 2 TD

==== Dayton at Port Huron ====
Week 4: Dayton Silverbacks at Port Huron Predators – Game summary

Quarter	1	2	3	4	Total
Silverbacks	13	7	8	6	34
Predators	13	23	18	7	61

at McMorran Arena, Port Huron, Michigan

- Date: March 19
- Game time: 7:30 p.m. EDT
- Game attendance: 1,700

Game information

1st quarter

- Dayton – (8:45) Daniel Stover 7-yard pass from Jeremy Greenleaf (Jeff Hubbard kick), Dayton 7–0
- Port Huron – (5:57) Robert Height 7-yard rush (Anthony Gay kick blocked), Dayton 7–6
- Port Huron - (1:15) Devon Daniels 22-yard pass from Jim Roth (Anthony Gay kick), Port Huron 13-7
- Dayton - (0:24) Fred Cromartie 45-yard kickoff return (Jeff Hubbard kick failed), 13-13

2nd quarter

- Port Huron - (11:17) Jeff Dempowske safety, Port Huron 15-13
- Port Huron - (11:13) Levi Raines 28-yard rush (Levi Raines rush), Port Huron 23-13
- Dayton - (7:37) Fred Cromartie 4-yard rush (Jeff Hubbard kick), Port Huron 23-20
- Port Huron – (5:51) Terry Mitchell 34-yard pass from Jim Roth (Anthony Gay kick), Port Huron 30–20
- Port Huron – (1:51) Roger Sippio 32-yard interception return (Jeff Hubbard kick), Port Huron 36–20

3rd quarter

- Port Huron - (14:04) Robert Height 16-yard rush (Anthony Gay kick), Port Huron 43-20
- Port Huron – (6:41) Anthony Gay 27-yard field goal, Port Huron 46–20
- Port Huron - (5:46) Devon Daniels 40-yard fumble return (Robert Height rush), Port Huron 54-20
- Dayton - (2:14) Melvin Bryant 34-yard pass from Bruce Jones (Melvin Bryant pass from Bruce Jones), Port Huron 54-28

4th quarter

- Port Huron - (5:42) Devon Daniels 22-yard pass from Jim Roth (Anthony Gay kick), Port Huron 61-28
- Dayton - (0:00) Daniel Stover 39-yard pass from Bruce Jones (none attempted), Port Huron 61-34

Passing

- Dayton – Jeremy Greenleaf: 6/19, 61 yards, 1 TD
- Port Huron – Jim Roth: 5/11, 92 yards, 3 TD

Rushing

- Dayton – Marcus Fails: 3 att, 7 yards, 0 TD
- Port Huron – Robert Height: 10 att, 48 yards, 2 TD

Receiving

- Dayton – Melvin Bryant: 5 rec, 87 yards, 1 TD
- Port Huron – Terry Mitchell: 3 rec, 48 yards, 1 TD

=== Week 5 ===
==== Dayton at Marion ====
Week 5: Dayton Silverbacks at Marion Blue Racers – Game summary

Quarter	1	2	3	4	Total
Silverbacks	7	0	0	6	13
Blue Racers	13	18	3	0	34

at Veterans Memorial Coliseum, Marion, Ohio

- Date: March 26
- Game time: 7:30 p.m. EDT
- Game attendance: 1,300
- Referee: Rick Jackson

Game information

1st quarter

- Dayton – (10:15) Daniel Stover 34-yard pass from Bruce Jones (Jeff Hubbard kick), Dayton 7–0
- Marion – (7:32) Bryceson Lawrence 0-yard fumble recovery (Tyler Lorenz kick), 7–7
- Marion - (3:32) Mike Tatum 46-yard pass from Josh Harris (Tyler Lorenz kick blocked), Marion 13-7

2nd quarter

- Marion - (4:12) Christen Haywood 4-yard rush (Tyler Lorenz kick), Marion 20-7
- Marion - (1:23) Brandon Williams 38-yard pass from Josh Harris (Brandon Williams pass from Josh Harris), Marion 28-7
- Marion – (0:00) Tyler Lorenz 36-yard field goal, Marion 31–7

3rd quarter

- Marion – (13:00) Tyler Lorenz 43-yard field goal, Marion 34–7

4th quarter

- Dayton - (1:41) Melvin Bryant 14-yard pass from Daniel Stover (Victor Tolbert rush failed), Marion 34-13

Passing

- Dayton – Daniel Stover: 4/18, 35 yards, 1 TD
- Marion – Josh Harris: 12/21, 179 yards, 2 TD

Rushing

- Dayton – Daniel Stover: 9 att, 87 yards, 0 TD
- Marion – Christen Haywood: 5 att, 8 yards, 1 TD

Receiving

- Dayton – Melvin Bryant: 3 rec, 29 yards, 1 TD
- Marion – Antonio Wells: 4 rec, 53 yards, 0 TD

=== Week 6 ===
==== Cincinnati at Dayton ====
Week 6: Cincinnati Commandos at Dayton Silverbacks – Game summary

Quarter	1	2	3	4	Total
Commandos	14	0	6	12	32
Silverbacks	0	9	6	0	15

at Hara Arena, Trotwood, Ohio

- Date: April 2
- Game time: 7:30 p.m. EDT

Game information

1st quarter

- Cincinnati – (10:13) Greg Moore 1-yard rush (Brandon Yingling kick), Cincinnati 7–0
- Cincinnati – (6:00) Derrick Moss 1-yard rush (Brandon Yingling kick), Cincinnati 14–0

2nd quarter

- Dayton - (14:13) Daniel Stover 32-yard pass from Chris Stanford (Jeff Hubbard kick failed), Cincinnati 14-6
- Dayton – (4:25) Jeff Hubbard 23-yard field goal, Cincinnati 14–9

3rd quarter

- Dayton - (13:53) Daniel Stover 27-yard pass from Chris Stanford (Jeff Hubbard kick failed), Dayton 15-14
- Cincinnati - (11:18) Greg Moore 13-yard pass from Tyler Sheehan (Derrick Moss rush failed), Cincinnati 20-15

4th quarter

- Cincinnati - (5:02) Greg Moore 2-yard rush (Tyler Sheehan pass failed), Cincinnati 26-15
- Cincinnati - (2:22) Moe Lee 11-yard pass from Tyler Sheehan (Tyler Sheehan pass failed), Cincinnati 32-15

Passing

- Cincinnati – Tyler Sheehan: 16/35, 188 yards, 2 TD
- Dayton – Chris Stanford: 9/19, 121 yards, 2 TD

Rushing

- Cincinnati – Greg Moore: 10 att, 14 yards, 1 TD
- Dayton – Chris Stanford: 5 att, 45 yards, 0 TD

Receiving

- Cincinnati – Brandon Boehm: 4 rec, 66 yards, 0 TD
- Dayton – Daniel Stover: 4 rec, 100 yards, 2 TD

==== Chicago at Port Huron ====
Week 6: Chicago Knights at Port Huron Predators – Game summary

Quarter	1	2	3	4	Total
Knights	7	9	16	13	45
Predators	7	7	8	7	29

at McMorran Arena, Port Huron, Michigan

- Date: April 2
- Game time: 7:30 p.m. EDT
- Game attendance: 1,519
- Referee: Dave Stein

Game information

1st quarter

- Port Huron – (3:44) Terry Mitchell 0-yard fumble recovery (Chris Tatti kick), Port Huron 7–0
- Chicago - (0:55) James Chicon 8-yard rush (Julie Harshbarger kick), 7-7

2nd quarter

- Port Huron – (13:04) Devon Daniels 14-yard pass from Jim Roth (Chris Tatti kick), Port Huron 14–7
- Chicago - (0:46) Brandon Wogoman 44-yard missed field goal return (Julie Harshbarger kick failed), Port Huron 14-13
- Chicago - (0:01) Julie Harshbarger 26-yard field goal, Chicago 16-14

3rd quarter

- Port Huron – (11:13) Jim Roth 11-yard rush (Adam Hurst rush), Port Huron 22–16
- Chicago - (9:07) Zontavius Johnson 23-yard pass from Ron Ricciardi (Julie Harshbarger kick), Chicago 23-22
- Chicago - (7:16) Tyler Damien safety, Chicago 25-22
- Chicago - (1:31) Ty Meyers 8-yard pass from Brandon Wogoman (Julie Harshbarger kick), Chicago 32-22

4th quarter

- Chicago - (7:56) James Chicon 2-yard rush (Julie Harshbarger kick), Chicago 39-22
- Port Huron – (4:05) Terry Mitchell 4-yard pass from Jim Roth (Chris Tatti kick), Chicago 39–29
- Chicago - (0:57) Brandon Wogoman 8-yard rush (Brandon Wogoman rush failed), Chicago 45-29

Passing

- Chicago – Ron Ricciardi: 10/17, 111 yards, 1 TD
- Port Huron – Jim Roth: 10/23, 94 yards, 2 TD

Rushing

- Chicago – Mike Hayden: 9 att, 36 yards, 0 TD
- Port Huron – Adam Hurst: 3 att, 25 yards, 0 TD

Receiving

- Chicago – Willie Tolon: 3 rec, 14 yards, 0 TD
- Port Huron – Terry Mitchell: 3 rec, 46 yards, 1 TD

==== Indianapolis at Marion ====
Week 6: Indianapolis Enforcers at Marion Blue Racers – Game summary

Quarter	1	2	3	4	Total
Enforcers	0	0	0	0	0
Blue Racers	26	27	12	13	78

at Veterans Memorial Coliseum, Marion, Ohio

- Date: April 2
- Game time: 7:30 p.m. EDT
- Game attendance: 1,200
- Referee: Les Anderson

Game information

1st quarter

- Marion - (12:51) Christen Haywood 12-yard rush (Tyler Lorenz kick), Marion 7-0
- Marion - (8:30) Christen Haywood 4-yard rush (Tyler Lorenz kick), Marion 14-0
- Marion - (7:15) Ray Saunders 0-yard fumnble recovery (Tyler Lorenz kick failed), Marion 20-0
- Marion - (1:00) Bryceson Lawrence 35-yard fumnble recovery (Tyler Lorenz kick failed), Marion 26-0

2nd quarter

- Marion - (11:15) Timothy Robinson 8-yard rush (Tyler Lorenz kick), Marion 33-0
- Marion - (6:45) Lorenzo Best 21-yard rush (Tyler Lorenz kick), Marion 40-0
- Marion - (1:30) Antonio Wells 26-yard pass form Timothy Robinson (Tyler Lorenz kick), Marion 47-0
- Marion - (0:46) Ryan Palmer 0-yard fumnble recovery (Tyler Lorenz kick failed), Marion 53-0

3rd quarter

- Marion - (10:00) Jerard Bennett 12-yard rush (Tyler Lorenz kick failed), Marion 59-0
- Marion - (4:30) Christen Haywood 9-yard rush (Tyler Lorenz kick failed), Marion 65-0

4th quarter

- Marion - (13:15) Jerard Bennett 9-yard rush (Tyler Lorenz kick failed), Marion 71-0
- Marion - (10:27) Mike Ellison 22-yard interception return (Tyler Lorenz kick), Marion 78-0

Passing

- Indianapolis – Dean Vinson: 8/26, 40 yards, 0 TD
- Marion – Timothy Robinson: 1/1, 26 yards, 1 TD

Rushing

- Indianapolis – Dean Vinson: 3 att, 14 yards, 0 TD
- Marion – Christen Haywood: 10 att, 57 yards, 3 TD

Receiving

- Indianapolis – Troy Summers: 2 rec, 17 yards, 0 TD
- Marion – Antonio Wells: 1 rec, 26 yards, 1 TD

=== Week 7 ===
==== Port Huron at Cincinnati ====
Week 7: Port Huron Predators at Cincinnati Commandos – Game summary

Quarter	1	2	3	4	Total
Predators	0	6	8	8	22
Commandos	7	19	7	14	47

at Cincinnati Gardens, Cincinnati, Ohio

- Date: April 8
- Game time: 7:30 p.m. EDT
- Referee: Dave Stein

Game information

1st quarter

- Cincinnati - (1:58) Phillip Barnett 10-yard pass from George Murray (Brandon Yingling kick), Cincinnati 7-0

2nd quarter

- Cincinnati - (8:49) Derrick Moss 14-yard rush (Brandon Yingling kick failed), Cincinnati 13-0
- Port Huron - (5:02) Anthony Gay 1-yard rush (Chris Tatti kick failed), Cincinnati 13-6
- Cincinnati - (2:38) J Baker 16-yard pass from George Murray (Brandon Yingling kick failed), Cincinnati 19-6
- Cincinnati - (1:37) Charles Hawkins 38-yard pass from George Murray (Brandon Yingling kick), Cincinnati 26-6

3rd quarter

- Cincinnati - (8:20) Derrick Moss 30-yard rush (Brandon Yingling kick), Cincinnati 33-6
- Port Huron - (5:18) Anthony Gay 11-yard rush (Erick Knott pass from M Akrawi), Cincinnati 33-14

4th quarter

- Port Huron - (9:05) Anthony Gay 42-yard rush (Ruben Gay rush), Cincinnati 33-22
- Cincinnati - (6:04) George Murray 3-yard rush (George Murray rush), Cincinnati 41-22
- Cincinnati - (0:00) Derrick Moss 14-yard rush (none attempted), Cincinnati 47-22

Passing

- Port Huron – Mike Akrawi: 6/16, 49 yards, 0 TD
- Cincinnati – George Murray: 8/16, 96 yards, 3 TD

Rushing

- Port Huron – Anthony Gay: 12 att, 96 yards, 3 TD
- Cincinnati – Derrick Moss: 10 att, 91 yards, 3 TD

Receiving

- Port Huron – Devon Daniels: 3 rec, 34 yards, 0 TD
- Cincinnati – Phillip Barnett: 2 rec, 26 yards, 1 TD

==== Marion at Dayton ====
Week 7: Marion Blue Racers at Dayton Silverbacks – Game summary

Quarter	1	2	3	4	Total
Blue Racers	9	6	10	6	31
Silverbacks	7	0	7	0	14

at Hara Arena, Trotwood, Ohio

- Date: April 9
- Game time: 7:30 p.m. EDT
- Referee: Les Anderson

Game information

1st quarter

- Dayton – (14:49) Fred Cromartie 54-yard kickoff return (Jeff Hubbard kick), Dayton 7–0
- Marion – (8:09) Michael Cross safety, Dayton 7–2
- Marion - (5:50) Christen Haywood 2-yard rush (Tyler Lorenz kick), Marion 9-7

2nd quarter

- Marion - (0:05) Brandon Williams 14-yard pass from Josh Harris (Tyler Lorenz kick failed), Marion 15-7

3rd quarter

- Marion - (13:53) Brandon Williams 37-yard pass from Josh Harris (Tyler Lorenz kick), Marion 22-7
- Dayton - (11:44) Chris Stanford 1-yard rush (Jeff Hubbard kick), Marion 22-14
- Marion – (8:19) Tyler Lorenz 37-yard field goal, Marion 25–14

4th quarter

- Marion - (2:47) Josh Harris 9-yard rush (Tyler Lorenz kick failed), Marion 31-14

Passing

- Marion – Josh Harris: 13/21, 107 yards, 2 TD
- Dayton – Chris Stanford: 4/17, 43 yards, 0 TD

Rushing

- Marion – Josh Harris: 9 att, 47 yards, 1 TD
- Dayton – Chris Stanford: 6 att, 37 yards, 0 TD

Receiving

- Marion – Brandon Williams: 5 rec, 77 yards, 2 TD
- Dayton – Fred Cromartie: 2 rec, 7 yards, 0 TD

==== Chicago at Indianapolis ====
Week 7: Chicago Knights at Indianapolis Enforcers – Game summary

Quarter	1	2	3	4	Total
Knights	7	14	14	7	42
Enforcers	0	12	0	2	14

at 10th Street Sports Center, Indianapolis, Indiana

- Date: April 9
- Game time: 7:30 p.m. EDT

Game information

1st quarter

- Chicago - (9:00) Harvery Allen 42-yard interception return (Julie Harshbarger kick), Chicago 7-0

2nd quarter

- Chicago - (3:35) Willie Tolon 7-yard pass from Ron Ricciardi (Julie Harshbarger kick), Chicago 14-0
- Indianapolis - (0:41) Ricky Emery 8-yard pass from DeMarcus Simons (Ian Pocurro kick failed), Chicago 14-6
- Chicago - (0:15) Willie Tolon 1-yard rush (Julie Harshbarger kick), Chicago 21-6
- Indianapolis - (0:03) Troy Summers 32-yard pass from DeMarcus Simons (DeMarcus Simons rush failed), Chicago 21-12

3rd quarter

- Chicago - (6:35) Ron Ricciardi 2-yard rush (Julie Harsbharger kick), Chicago 28-12
- Chicago - (0:00) Willie Tolon 13-yard pass from Ron Ricciardi (Julie Harshbarger kick), Chicago 35-12

4th quarter

- Chicago - (5:30) Brandon Wogoman 1-yard rush (Julie Harshbarger kick), Marion 42-12
- Indianapolis - (0:00) Joel Fravel safety, Chicago 42-14

Passing

- Chicago – Ron Ricciardi: 12/16, 112 yards, 2 TD
- Indianapolis – DeMarcus Simons: 11/24, 130 yards, 2 TD

Rushing

- Chicago – James Chicon: 7 att, 34 yards, 0 TD
- Indianapolis – Ricky Emery: 8 att, 29 yards, 0 TD

Receiving

- Chicago – Willie Tolon: 5 rec, 49 yards, 2 TD
- Indianapolis – Troy Summers: 3 rec, 47 yards, 1 TD

=== Week 8 ===
==== Indianapolis at Chicago ====
Week 8: Indianapolis Enforcers at Chicago Knights – Game summary

Quarter	1	2	3	4	Total
Enforcers	0	6	0	0	6
Knights	6	23	9	14	52

at Victory Sports Complex, Loves Park, Illinois

- Date: April 17
- Game time: 2:30 p.m. CDT
- Game attendance: 170
- Referee: Tommy Tyks

Game information

1st quarter

- Chicago - (11:45) Mike Williams 2-yard rush (Julie Harshbarger kick failed), Chicago 6-0

2nd quarter

- Chicago - (14:52) Julie Harshbarger 23-yard field goal, Chicago 9-0
- Chicago - (10:04) J Openga 14-yard pass from Ron Ricciardi (Julie Harshbarger kick), Chicago 16-0
- Chicago - (10:04) Team Rouge, Chicago 17-0
- Chicago - (6:01) Julie Harshbarger 20-yard field goal, Chicago 20-0
- Indianapolis - (1:59) DeMarcus Simons 1-yard rush (DeMarcus Simons pass failed), Chicago 20-6
- Chicago - (0:24) James Chicon 1-yard rush (Zac Peterson rush failed), Chicago 26-6
- Chicago - (0:00) Julie Harshbarger 17-yard field goal, Chicago 29-6

3rd quarter

- Chicago - (6:24) Zontavius Johnson 12-yard pass from Ron Ricciardi (Julie Harshbarger kick), Chicago 36-6
- Chicago - (3:32) Team Safety, Chicago 38-6

4th quarter

- Chicago - (6:18) J Openga 38-yard pass from Brandon Jewett (Julie Harshbarger kick), Chicago 45-6
- Chicago - (0:12) Mike Williams 11-yard rush (Julie Harshbarger kick failed), Chicago 52-6

Passing

- Indianapolis – DeMarcus Simons: 7/22, 43 yards, 0 TD
- Chicago – Ron Ricciardi: 8/18, 82 yards, 2 TD

Rushing

- Indianapolis – DeMarcus Simons: 9 att, 19 yards, 1 TD
- Chicago – Mike Williams: 9 att, 47 yards, 2 TD

Receiving

- Indianapolis – Karl Jones: 4 rec, 34 yards, 0 TD
- Chicago – Zontavius Johnson: 4 rec, 36 yards, 1 TD

==== Marion at Port Huron ====
Week 8: Marion Blue Racers at Port Huron Predators – Game summary

Quarter	1	2	3	4	Total
Blue Racers	8	3	7	29	47
Predators	0	9	0	6	15

at McMorran Arena, Port Huron, Michigan

- Date: April 16
- Game time: 7:30 p.m. EDT
- Game attendance: 1,073
- Referee: Les Anderson

Game information

1st quarter

- Marion - (4:45) Mike Tatum 29-yard pass from Josh Harris (Tyler Lorenz kick), Marion 7-0
- Marion – (3:59) Victor Rodriguez rouge, Marion 8–0

2nd quarter

- Port Huron - (7:31) Robert Height 14-yard pass from Calvin Toliver (Ruben Gay pass failed), Marion 8-6
- Port Huron - (0:37) Chris Tatti 27-yard field goal, Port Huron 9-8
- Marion – (0:01) Tyler Lorenz 36-yard field goal, Marion 11-9

3rd quarter

- Marion - (4:49) Brandon Williams 31-yard pass from Josh Harris (B Ickard kick), Marion 18-9

4th quarter

- Marion - (14:53) Mike Tatum 18-yard rush (Tyler Lorenz kick), Marion 25-9
- Port Huron - (13:53) Ruben Gay 3-yard rush (Ruben Gay rush failed), Marion 25-15
- Marion - (12:58) Mike Tatum 45-yard kickoff return (Tyler Lorenz kick), Marion 32-15
- Marion - (9:05) Josh Harris 28-yard rush (Tyler Lorenz kick), 39-15
- Marion – (8:22) Lorenzo Best rouge, Marion 40–15
- Marion - (3:15) Brandon Williams 6-yard pass from Josh Harris (B Ickard kick), Marion 47-15

Passing

- Marion – Josh Harris: 7/18, 113 yards, 3 TD
- Port Huron – Mike Akrawi: 4/11, 39 yards, 0 TD

Rushing

- Marion – Josh Harris: 2 att, 29 yards, 1 TD
- Port Huron – Anthony Gay: 11 att, 30 yards, 0 TD

Receiving

- Marion – Brandon Williams: 5 rec, 76 yards, 2 TD
- Port Huron – Devon Daniels: 4 rec, 56 yards, 0 TD

=== Week 9 ===
==== Dayton at Chicago ====
Week 9: Dayton Silverbacks at Chicago Knights – Game summary

Quarter	1	2	3	4	Total
Silverbacks	7	14	3	0	24
Knights	11	3	7	0	21

at Victory Sports Complex, Loves Park, Illinois

- Date: April 22
- Game time: 7:30 p.m. CDT
- Game attendance: 210
- Referee: Tommy Tyks

Game information

1st quarter

- Chicago – (15:00) Shawn McKeown rouge, Chicago 1–0
- Chicago – (11:55) Gemayel Cowseer 12-yard interception return (Julie Harshbarger kick), 8–0
- Chicago – (6:41) Julie Harshbarger 23-yard field goal, Chicago 11-0
- Dayton – (4:44) Ronald Russell 2-yard rush (Jeff Hubbard kick), Chicago 11–7

2nd quarter

- Chicago – (14:16) Julie Harshbarger 25-yard field goal, Chicago 14-7
- Dayton – (0:44) Ronald Russell 5-yard rush (Jeff Hubbard kick), 14–14
- Dayton – (00:26) Viterio Jones 30-yard interception return (Jeff Hubbard kick), 21–14

3rd quarter

- Dayton – (7:35) Jeff Hubbard 25-yard field goal, Dayton 24-14
- Chicago - (2:18) Brandon Wogoman 9-yard pass from Brandon Jewett (Julie Harshbarger kick), Dayton 24-21

4th quarter

Passing

- Dayton – Jeremy Greenleaf: 6/17, 104 yards, 0 TD
- Chicago – Brandon Jewett: 4/10, 30 yards, 1 TD

Rushing

- Dayton – Victor Tolbert: 8 att, 24 yards, 0 TD
- Chicago – Dante Washington: 4 att, 6 yards, 0 TD

Receiving

- Dayton – Melvin Bryant: 3 rec, 70 yards, 0 TD
- Chicago – Willie Tolon: 4 rec, 17 yards, 0 TD

=== Week 10 ===
==== Cincinnati at Dayton ====
Week 10: Cincinnati Commandos at Dayton Silverbacks – Game summary

Quarter	1	2	3	4	Total
Silverbacks	0	7	0	0	7
Commandos	14	7	7	13	41

at Cincinnati Gardens, Cincinnati, Ohio

- Date: April 29
- Game time: 8:05 p.m. EDT
- Referee: Les Anderson

Game information

1st quarter

- Cincinnati – (6:24) Tyler Sheehan 5-yard rush (Brandon Yingling kick), Cincinnati 7–0
- Cincinnati – (1:28) Marcus Spencer 51-yard interception return (Brandon Yingling kick), Cincinnati 14–0

2nd quarter

- Dayton - (13:33) Daniel Stover 6-yard pass from Jarvis Taylor (Jeff Hubbard kick), Cincinnati 14-7
- Cincinnati – (2:11) Tyler Sheehan 1-yard rush (Brandon Yingling kick), Cincinnati 21–7

3rd quarter

- Cincinnati - (8:06) Greg Moore 6-yard rush (Brandon Yingling kick), Cincinnati 28-7

4th quarter

- Cincinnati - (9:55) Derrick Moss 1-yard rush (Brandon Yingling kick), Cincinnati 35-7
- Cincinnati - (5:43) Phillip Barnett 30-yard pass from Tyler Sheehan (Brandon Yingling kick failed), Cincinnati 41-7

Passing

- Dayton – Jarvis Taylor: 6/19, 40 yards, 1 TD
- Cincinnati – Tyler Sheehan: 10/21, 113 yards, 1 TD

Rushing

- Dayton – Ronald Russell: 7 att, 13 yards, 0 TD
- Cincinnati – Greg Moore: 7 att, 42 yards, 1 TD

Receiving

- Dayton – Daniel Stover: 3 rec, 28 yards, 1 TD
- Cincinnati – Phillip Barnett: 2 rec, 50 yards, 1 TD

==== Chicago at Marion ====
Week 10: Chicago Knights at Marion Blue Racers – Game summary

Quarter	1	2	3	4	Total
Knights	3	0	0	0	3
Blue Racers	0	9	9	13	31

at Veterans Memorial Coliseum, Marion, Ohio

- Date: April 30
- Game time: 7:30 p.m. EDT
- Game attendance: 1,100
- Referee: Dave Stein

Game information

1st quarter

- Chicago – (10:40) Julie Harshbarger 28-yard field goal, Chicago 3-0

2nd quarter

- Marion - (14:45) Mike Tatum 6-yard pass from Josh Harris (Tyler Lorenz kick), Marion 7-3
- Marion – (0:00) Team Safety, Marion 9–3

3rd quarter

- Marion – (11:45) Team Safety, Marion 11–3
- Marion - (8:15) Mike Tatum 6-yard pass from Josh Harris (Tyler Lorenz kick), Marion 18-3

4th quarter

- Marion – (8:08) Marc Huddleston 5-yard rush (Tyler Lorenz kick), Marion 25–3
- Marion – (1:00) Christen Haywood 2-yard rush (Tyler Lorenz kick failed), Marion 31–3

Passing

- Chicago – Brandon Jewett: 13/27, 82 yards, 0 TD
- Marion – Josh Harris: 8/15, 67 yards, 2 TD

Rushing

- Chicago – Brandon Wogoman: 2 att, 7 yards, 0 TD
- Marion – Christen Haywood: 6 att, 44 yards, 1 TD

Receiving

- Chicago – Brandon Wogoman: 5 rec, 43 yards, 0 TD
- Marion – Christen Haywood: 2 rec, 20 yards, 0 TD

==== Indianapolis at Port Huron ====
Week 10: Indianapolis Enforcers at Port Huron Predators – Game summary

Quarter	1	2	3	4	Total
Enforcers	2	0	0	0	2
Predators	0	0	0	0	0

at McMorran Arena, Port Huron, Michigan

- Date: April 30
- Game time: 7:30 p.m. EDT

Game information
Port Huron Forfeit

=== Week 11 ===
==== Indianapolis at Dayton ====
Week 11: Indianapolis Enforcers at Dayton Silverbacks – Game summary

Quarter	1	2	3	4	Total
Enforcers	6	0	0	0	6
Silverbacks	14	25	15	21	75

at Hara Arena, Trotwood, Ohio

- Date: May 7
- Game time: 7:30 p.m. EDT

Game information

1st quarter

- Dayton – (13:55) Melvin Bryant 15-yard pass from Bruce Jones(Jeff Hubbard kick), Dayton 7–0
- Indianapolis - (10:22) DeMarcus Simons 1-yard rush (DeMarcus Simons pass intercepted), Dayton 7-6
- Dayton – (7:43) Ronald Russell 3-yard rush (Jeff Hubbard kick), Dayton 14–6

2nd quarter

- Dayton - (11:24) Bruce Jones 3-yard rush (Jeff Hubbard kick failed), Dayton 20-6
- Dayton - (7:08) Neimiah Simons 37-yard fumble return (Jeff Hubbard kick failed), Dayton 26-6
- Dayton – (0:55) Ronald Russell 6-yard rush (Jeff Hubbard kick), Dayton 33–6
- Dayton - (0:07) Daniel Stover 2-yard pass from Bruce Jones (Jeff Hubbard kick failed), Dayton 39-6

3rd quarter

- Dayton – (9:10) S Spencer safety, Dayton 41–6
- Dayton – (6:59) Marque Jones 16-yard pass from Bruce Jones (Jeff Hubbard kick failed), Dayton 47–6
- Dayton – (2:26) Marque Jones 12-yard pass from Bruce Jones (Jeff Hubbard kick), Dayton 54–6

4th quarter

- Dayton – (7:10) Jarvis Taylor 11-yard rush (Daniel Stover rush), Dayton 62–6
- Dayton - (5:14) Austin Goss 13-yard fumble return (Jeff Hubbard kick failed), Dayton 68-6
- Dayton - (1:14) Daniel Stover 0-yard fumble return (Jeff Hubbard kick), Dayton 75-6

Passing

- Indianapolis – DaMarcus Simons: 8/19, 37 yards, 0 TD
- Dayton – Bruce Jones: 7/12, 84 yards, 4 TD

Rushing

- Indianapolis – DeMarcus Simons: 11 att, 28 yards, 1 TD
- Dayton – Ronald Russell: 6 att, 39 yards, 2 TD

Receiving

- Indianapolis – Montez Williams: 1 rec, 20 yards, 0 TD
- Dayton – Daniel Stover: 2 rec, 31 yards, 1 TD

==== Cincinnati at Chicago ====
Week 11: Cincinnati Commandos at Chicago Knights – Game summary

Quarter	1	2	3	4	Total
Commandos	14	7	0	27	48
Knights	6	13	6	16	41

at Victory Sports Complex, Loves Park, Illinois

- Date: May 8
- Game time: 7:30 p.m. CDT

Game information

1st quarter

- Cincinnati – (10:04) Derrick Moss 3-yard rush (Brandon Yingling kick), Cincinnati 7–0
- Cincinnati - (5:51) Phillip Barnett 3-yard pass from George Murray (Brandon Yingling kick), Cincinnati 14-0
- Chicago - (4:10) Zontavious Johnson 12-yard pass from Brandon Jewett (Julie Harshbarger kick failed), Cincinnati 14-6

2nd quarter

- Chicago - (7:35) Brandon Wogoman 19-yard pass from Brandon Jewett (James Cichon rush failed), Cincinnati 14-12
- Cincinnati – (5:36) Derrick Moss 16-yard rush (Brandon Yingling kick), Cincinnati 21–12
- Chicago - (1:12) Shawn McKeown 1-yard rush (Julie Harshbarger kick), Cincinnati 21-19

3rd quarter

- Chicago - (8:55) Willie Tolon 8-yard pass from Brandon Jewett (James Cichon rush failed), Chicago 25-21

4th quarter

- Cincinnati – (13:17) Derrick Moss 1-yard rush (George Murray pass failed), Cincinnati 27–25
- Chicago - (7:55) Julie Harshbarger 20-yard field goal, Chicago 28-27
- Chicago - (5:42) Brandon Wogoman 38-yard pass from Brandon Jewett (Brandon Jewett pass failed), Chicago 34-27
- Cincinnati - (3:18) Brandon Boehm 15-yard pass from George Murray (Brandon Yingling kick), 34-34
- Chicago - (1:53) Zontavious Johnson 27-yard pass from Brandon Jewett (Julie Harshbarger kick), Chicago 41-34
- Cincinnati - (0:31) Greg Moore 19-yard pass from George Murray (Brandon Yingling kick failed), Chicago 41-40
- Cincinnati - (0:05) Kyenes Mincy 15-yard pass from George Murray (Greg Moore rush), Cincinnati 48-41

Passing

- Cincinnati – George Murray: 10/27, 110 yards, 4 TD
- Chicago – Brandon Jewett: 13/21, 183 yards, 5 TD

Rushing

- Cincinnati – Derrick Moss: 10 att, 32 yards, 3 TD
- Chicago – Brandon Jewett: 4 att, 14 yards, 0 TD

Receiving

- Cincinnati – Brandon Boeh,: 3 rec, 40 yards, 1 TD
- Chicago – Brandon Wogoman: 4 rec, 91 yards, 2 TD

=== Week 12 ===
==== Chicago at Dayton ====
Week 12: Chicago Knights at Dayton Silverbacks – Game summary

Quarter	1	2	3	4	Total
Knights	0	12	0	8	20
Silverbacks	10	13	0	14	37

at Hara Arena, Trotwood, Ohio

- Date: May 13
- Game time: 7:30 p.m. EDT
- Referee: Les Anderson

Game information

1st quarter

- Dayton – (11:08) Jeff Hubbard 32-yard field goal, Dayton 3–0
- Dayton – (7:14) Mychel Davis 5-yard blocked field goal return (Jeff Hubbard kick), Dayton 10–0

2nd quarter

- Chicago - (14:52) Willie Tolon 13-yard pass from Brandon Jewett (Julie Harshbarger kick failed), Dayton 10-6
- Chicago - (13:03) Martel Taylor 47-yard interception return (Julie Harshbarger kick failed), Chicago 12-6
- Dayton - (1:42) Daniel Stover 36-yard pass from Bruce Jones (Jeff Hubbard kick blocked), Dayton 16-12
- Dayton – (0:33) Mychel Davis 27-yard fumble recovery (Jeff Hubbard kick), Dayton 23–12

3rd quarter
4th quarter

- Dayton – (12:03) Melvin Bryant 8-yard pass from Bruce Jones(Jeff Hubbard kick), Dayton 30–12
- Chicago – (7:15) Team Safety, Dayton 30–14
- Chicago - (5:54) Brandon Jewett 1-yard rush (Brandon Jewett rush failed), Dayton 30-20
- Dayton - (0:22) Viterio Jones 47-yard interception return (Jeff Hubbard kick), Dayton 37-20

Passing

- Chicago – Brandon Jewett: 12/33, 115 yards, 1 TD
- Dayton – Bruce Jones: 5/12, 71 yards, 2 TD

Rushing

- Chicago – Brandon Jewett: 9 att, 26 yards, 1 TD
- Dayton – Ronald Russell: 6 att, 9 yards, 0 TD

Receiving

- Chicago – Willie Tolon: 10 rec, 111 yards, 1 TD
- Dayton – Daniel Stover: 4 rec, 63 yards, 1 TD

==== Indianapolis at Marion ====
Week 12: Indianapolis Enforcers at Marion Blue Racers – Game summary

Quarter	1	2	3	4	Total
Enforcers	6	6	0	0	12
Blue Racers	0	32	14	27	73

at Veterans Memorial Coliseum, Marion, Ohio

- Date: May 14
- Game time: 7:30 p.m. EDT
- Game attendance: 1,100
- Referee: Tommy Tyks

Game information

1st quarter

- Indianapolis - (10:00) Montez Williams 2-yard pass from DeMarcus Simons (Darnell Taylor rush failed), Indianapolis 6-0

2nd quarter

- Marion - (14:47) Christen Haywood 10-yard rush (Tyler Lorenz kick), Marion 7-6
- Marion - (14:16) Team Rouge, Marion 8-6
- Marion - (8:00) Tyler Lorenz 31-yard field goal, Marion 11-6
- Indianapolis - (5:00) Shannon Russell 29-yard pass from DeMarcus Simons (DeMarcus Simons pass failed), Indianapolis 12-11
- Marion - (2:25) Brandon Williams 4-yard pass from Josh Harris (Tyler Lorenz kick failed), Marion 17-12
- Marion - (1:00) Mike Tatum 32-yard pass from Josh Harris (Tyler Lorenz kick), Marion 24-12
- Marion - (0:10) Brandon Williams 26-yard pass form Josh Harris (Ryan Palmer pass form Marc Huddelston), Marion 32-12

3rd quarter

- Marion - (13:45) Marc Huddelston 4-yard rush (Tyler Lorenz kick), Marion 39-12
- Marion - (8:35) Marc Huddelston 35-yard pass form Josh Harris (Tyler Lorenz kick), Marion 46-12

4th quarter

- Marion - (14:15) Mike Tatum 41-yard pass from Josh Harris (Tyler Lorenz kick), Marion 53-12
- Marion - (8:41) Marc Huddelston 18-yard rush (Tyler Lorenz kick), Marion 60-12
- Marion - (5:30) Jared Dorn 28-yard fumble recovery (Tyler Lorenz kick), Marion 67-12
- Marion - (0:00) Victor Tolbert 32-yard rush (None Attempted), Marion 73-12

Passing

- Indianapolis – DeMarcus Simons: 13/20, 108 yards, 2 TD
- Marion – Josh Harris: 7/11, 140 yards, 5 TD

Rushing

- Indianapolis – DeMarcus Simons: 12 att, 51 yards, 0 TD
- Marion – Victor Tolbert: 2 att, 38 yards, 1 TD

Receiving

- Indianapolis – Shannon Russell: 4 rec, 41 yards, 1 TD
- Marion – Mike Tatum: 3 rec, 76 yards, 2 TD

==== Cincinnati at Port Huron ====
Week 12: Cincinnati Commandos at Port Huron Predators – Game summary

Quarter	1	2	3	4	Total
Commandos	2	0	0	0	2
Predators	0	0	0	0	0

at McMorran Arena, Port Huron, Michigan

- Date: May 14
- Game time: 7:30 p.m. EDT

Game information
Port Huron Forfeit

=== Week 13 ===
==== Indianapolis at Cincinnati ====
Week 13: Indianapolis Enforcers at Cincinnati Commandos – Game summary

Quarter	1	2	3	4	Total
Enforcers	0	0	0	0	0
Commandos	14	15	26	26	81

at Cincinnati Gardens, Cincinnati, Ohio

- Date: May 21
- Game time: 7:30 p.m. EDT
- Referee: Tommy Tyks

Game information

1st quarter

- Cincinnati - (12:42) George Murray 12-yard pass from Tyler Sheehan (Brandon Yingling kick failed), Cincinnati 6-0
- Cincinnati – (2:05) Tyler Sheehan 1-yard rush (Frank Straub pass from Tyler Sheehan), Cincinnati 14–0

2nd quarter

- Cincinnati - (12:57) Brandon Boehm 24-yard pass from Tyler Sheehan (George Murray pass from Tyler Sheehan), Cincinnati 22-0
- Cincinnati - (10:03) Kyenes Mincy 5-yard pass from Tyler Sheehan (Brandon Yingling kick), Cincinnati 29-0

3rd quarter

- Cincinnati - (13:56) Kyenes Mincy 27-yard pass from Tyler Sheehan (Brandon Yingling kick), Cincinnati 36-0
- Cincinnati - (11:45) Phillip Barnett 2-yard pass from George Murray (Brandon Yingling kick failed), Cincinnati 42-0
- Cincinnati - (6:12) Keith Brooks 3-yard rush (Brandon Yingling kick), Cincinnati 49-0
- Cincinnati - (0:21) Phillip Barnett 19-yard pass from George Murray (Brandon Boehm pass failed), Cincinnati 55-0

4th quarter

- Cincinnati - (11:00) Kyenes Mincy 32-yard pass from George Murray (Brandon Yingling kick), Cincinnati 62-0
- Cincinnati - (5:31) Phillip Barnett 19-yard pass from George Murray (Brandon Yingling kick failed), Cincinnati 68-0
- Cincinnati - (3:30) Jeff Franklin 23-yard interception return (Brandon Yingling kick failed), Cincinnati 74-0
- Cincinnati - (0:23) Wendell Brown 0-yard fumble recovery (Brandon Yingling kick), Cincinnati 81-0

Passing

- Indianapolis – DeMarcus Simons: 5/21, 37 yards, 0 TD
- Cincinnati – George Murray: 8/11, 112 yards, 4 TD

Rushing

- Indianapolis – Darnell Taylor: 3 att, 3 yards, 0 TD
- Cincinnati – Greg Moore: 2 att, 32 yards, 0 TD

Receiving

- Indianapolis – Montez Williams: 2 rec, 9 yards, 0 TD
- Cincinnati – Phillip Barnett: 5 rec, 64 yards, 3 TD

==== Marion at Chicago ====
Week 13: Marion Blue Racers at Chicago Knights – Game summary

Quarter	1	2	3	4	Total
Blue Racers	13	10	14	16	53
Knights	6	0	6	12	24

at Victory Sports Complex, Loves Park, Illinois

- Date: May 22
- Game time: 7:30 p.m. CDT
- Game attendance: 75
- Referee: Jim Bernardi

Game information

1st quarter

- Chicago - (9:07) Willie Tolon 28-yard pass from Brandon Jewett (Julie Harshbarger kick failed), Chicago 6-0
- Marion - (4:34) Robert Price 2-yard rush (Tyler Lorenz kick blocked), 6-6
- Marion - (0:00) Mark Huddleston 8-yard pass from Mike Tatum (Tyler Lorenz kick), Marion 13-6

2nd quarter

- Marion - (5:39) Josh Harris 1-yard rush (Tyler Lorenz kick), Marion 20-6
- Marion - (0:00) Tyler Lorenz 24-yard field goal, Marion 23-6

3rd quarter

- Marion - (14:18) Brandon Williams 25-yard pass form Josh Harris (Tyler Lorenz kick), Marion 30-6
- Marion - (2:40) Josh Harris 6-yard rush (Tyler Lorenz kick), Marion 37-6
- Chicago - (1:07) Zontavius Johnson 15-yard pass from Brandon Jewett (Willie Tolon pass failed), Marion 37-12

4th quarter

- Marion - (12:33) Josh Harris 3-yard rush (Tyler Lorenz kick), Marion 44-12
- Chicago - (9:12) Dante Washington 4-yard rush (Brandon Jewett pass intercepted), Marion 44-18
- Marion - (9:12) J Dorn returned PAT, Marion 46-18
- Marion - (6:43) Bishop Hills 8-yard pass from Marc Huddelston (Tyler Lorenz kick), Marion 53-18
- Chicago - (4:02) Shawn McKeown 13-yard pass from Brandon Jewett (Brandon Jewett pass failed), Marion 53-24

Passing

- Marion – Josh Harris: 3/7, 43 yards, 1 TD
- Chicago – Brandon Jewett: 15/30, 135 yards, 3 TD

Rushing

- Marion – Josh Harris: 5 att, 21 yards, 3 TD
- Chicago – Dante Washington: 3 att, 8 yards, 1 TD

Receiving

- Marion – Christen Haywood: 2 rec, 36 yards, 0 TD
- Chicago – Neil Wilcox: 5 rec, 32 yards, 0 TD

=== Week 14 ===
==== Marion at Cincinnati ====
Week 14: Marion Blue Racers at Cincinnati Commandos – Game summary

Quarter	1	2	3	4	Total
Blue Racers	0	7	6	7	20
Commandos	13	10	0	27	50

at Cincinnati Gardens, Cincinnati, Ohio

- Date: May 28
- Game time: 7:30 p.m. EDT
- Referee: Tommy Tyks

Game information

1st quarter

- Cincinnati – (10:24) Kyenes Mincy 16-yard pass from Tyler Sheehan (Brandon Boehm rush failed), Cincinnati 6–0
- Cincinnati – (1:21) Phillip Barnett 7-yard pass from Tyler Sheehan (Brandon Yingling kick), Cincinnati 13–0

2nd quarter

- Cincinnati – (3:01) Brandon Yingling 28-yard field goal, Cincinnati 16-0
- Marion – (0:53) Josh Harris 1-yard rush (Tyler Lorenz kick), Cincinnati 16–7
- Cincinnati - (0:27) Derrick Moss 4-yard rush (Brandon Yingling kick), Cincinnati 23-7

3rd quarter

- Marion – (7:40) Josh Harris 5-yard rush (Tyler Lorenz kick blocked), Cincinnati 23–13

4th quarter

- Cincinnati - (13:03) Tyler Sheehan 3-yard rush (Brandon Yingling kick), Cincinnati 30-13
- Marion - (10:40) Marc Huddelston 14-yard pass from Josh Harris (Tyler Lorenz kick), Cincinnati 30-20
- Cincinnati - (8:12) Derrick Moss 23-yard pass from Tyler Sheehan (Brandon Yingling kick), Cincinnati 37-20
- Cincinnati - (4:23) Terrill Byrd 15-yard fumble recovery (Brandon Yingling kick), Cincinnati 44-20
- Cincinnati – (0:00) Phillip Barnett 22-yard pass from Tyler Sheehan (None Attempted), Cincinnati 50–20

Passing

- Marion – Josh Harris: 10/18, 64 yards, 1 TD
- Cincinnati – Tyler Sheehan: 14/27, 157 yards, 4 TD

Rushing

- Marion – Josh Harris: 10 att, 37 yards, 2 TD
- Cincinnati – Derrick Moss: 8 att, 38 yards, 1 TD

Receiving

- Marion – Marc Huddelston: 3 rec, 25 yards, 1 TD
- Cincinnati – George Murray: 7 rec, 61 yards, 0 TD

==== Port Huron at Dayton ====
Week 14: Port Huron Predators at Dayton Silverbacks – Game summary

Quarter	1	2	3	4	Total
Predators	0	0	0	0	0
Silverbacks	2	0	0	0	2

at Hara Arena, Dayton, Ohio

- Date: May
- Game time: 7:30 p.m. EDT

Game information
Port Huron Forfeit

=== Week 15 ===
==== Port Huron at Chicago ====
Week 15: Port Huron Predators at Chicago Knights – Game summary

Quarter	1	2	3	4	Total
Predators	0	0	0	0	0
Knights	2	0	0	0	2

at Victory Sport Complex, Loves Park, Illinois

- Date: June 4
- Game time: 7:30 p.m. CDT

Game information
Port Huron Forfeit

== Playoffs ==
Semifinals
3	Dayton	18
2	Marion	53
4	Chicago	13
1	Cincinnati	71

CIFL Championship Game
2	Marion	29
1	Cincinnati	44

=== 1 vs 4 Semifinal Game: Cincinnati Commandos at Chicago Knights ===
1 vs 4 Semifinal Game: Chicago Knights at Cincinnati Commandos – Game summary

Quarter	1	2	3	4	Total
Knights	0	13	0	0	13
Commandos	20	28	7	16	71

at Cincinnati Gardens, Cincinnati, Ohio

- Date: June 3
- Game time: 8:05 p.m. EDT
- Referee: Les Anderson

Game information

1st quarter

- Cincinnati - (13:17) Derrick Moss 14-yard pass from Tyler Sheehan (Brandon Yingling kick), Cincinnati 7-0
- Cincinnati - (8:23) Kyenes Mincy 9-yard pass from Tyler Sheehan (Brandon Yingling kick blocked), Cincinnati 13-0
- Cincinnati - (2:00) Derrick Moss 1-yard rush, (Brandon Yingling kick), Cincinnati 20-0

2nd quarter

- Chicago - (14:52) Willie Tolon 9-yard pass from Brandon Jewett, (Julie Harshbarger kick), Cincinnati 20-7
- Cincinnati - (12:53) Kyenes Mincy 23-yard pass from Tyler Sheehan (Shawn McGarity pass failed), Cincinnati 26-7
- Chicago - (11:15) Shawn McKeown 39-yard pass from Brandon Jewett, (Julie Harshbarger kick blocked), Cincinnati 26-13
- Cincinnati - (11:15) Fabian Connor PAT return, Cincinnati 28-13
- Cincinnati - (9:16) Phillip Barnett 27-yard pass from Tyler Sheehan (Brandon Yingling kick failed), Cincinnati 34-13
- Cincinnati - (5:38) Shawn McGarity 11-yard pass from Tyler Sheehan (Greg Moore rush), Cincinnati 42-13
- Cincinnati - (1:27) Derrick Moss 14-yard pass from Tyler Sheehan (Brandon Yingling kick failed), Cincinnati 48-13

3rd quarter

- Cincinnati - (10:56) Kyenes Mincy 2-yard pass from Tyler Sheehan (Brandon Yingling kick), Cincinnati 55-13

4th quarter

- Cincinnati - (12:21) Brandon Boehm 13-yard pass from Tyler Sheehan (Brandon Yingling kick failed), Cincinnati 61-13
- Cincinnati - (8:08) Phillip Barnett 20-yard pass from Tyler Sheehan (Brandon Yingling kick), Cincinnati 68-13
- Cincinnati - (1:16) Brandon Yingling 32-yard field goal, Cincinnati 71-13

Passing

- Chicago – Brandon Jewett: 12/28, 137 yards, 2 TD
- Cincinnati – Tyler Sheehan: 17/27, 194 yards, 9 TD

Rushing

- Chicago – Mike Keeton: 1 att, 2 yards, 0 TD
- Cincinnati – Derrick Moss: 8 att, 36 yards, 1 TD

Receiving

- Chicago – Shawn McGarity: 5 rec, 99 yards, 1 TD
- Cincinnati – Phillip Barnett: 6 rec, 89 yards, 2 TD

=== 2 vs 3 Semifinal Game: vs Dayton Silverbacks at Marion Blue Racers ===
2 vs 3 Semifinal Game: Dayton Silverbacks at Marion Blue Racers – Game summary

Quarter	1	2	3	4	Total
Silverbacks	0	0	6	12	18
Blue Racers	9	7	14	23	53

at Veterans Memorial Coliseum, Marion, Ohio

- Date: June 6
- Game time: 7:35 p.m. EDT
- Game attendance: 1,300
- Referee: Rick Jackson

Game information

1st quarter

- Marion – (1:49) Bishop Mills safety, Marion 2–0
- Marion - (0:54) Christen Haywood 2-yard rush (Tyler Lorenz kick), Marion 9-0

2nd quarter

- Marion - (4:49) Christen Haywood 2-yard rush (Tyler Lorenz kick), Marion 16-0

3rd quarter

- Marion - (9:26) Mike Tatum 1-yard rush (Tyler Lorenz kick), Marion 23-0
- Marion - (3:13) Josh Harris 5-yard rush (Tyler Lorenz kick), Marion 30-0
- Dayton - (0:22) Daniel Stover 10-yard pass from Jarvis Taylor (Jarvis Taylor pass failed), Marion 30-6

4th quarter

- Marion - (10:41) Marc Huddelston 17-yard pass from Josh Harris (Tyler Lorenz kick), Marion 37-6
- Dayton - (5:31) Ronald Russell 1-yard rush (Jarvis Taylor rush failed), Marion 37-12
- Marion - (1:14) LaMarr Stewart 0-yard fumble recovery (Tyler Lorenz kick), Marion 44-12
- Dayton - (0:49) Daniel Stover 5-yard pass from Jarvis Taylor (Victor Jett rush failed), Marion 44-18
- Marion – (0:22) Brandon Williams 6-yard pass from Josh Harris (Tyler Lorenz kick), Marion 51–18
- Marion – (0:07) Jared Dorn safety, Marion 53–18

Passing

- Dayton – Jarvis Taylor: 7/17, 62 yards, 2 TD
- Marion – Josh Harris: 5/11, 48 yards, 2 TD

Rushing

- Dayton – Jarvis Taylor: 12 att, 20 yards, 0 TD
- Marion – Mike Tatum: 5 att, 21 yards, 1 TD

Receiving

- Dayton – Daniel Stover: 4 rec, 32 yards, 2 TD
- Marion – Mike Tatum: 2 rec, 29 yards, 0 TD

=== 2011 CIFL Championship Game: Cincinnati Commandos vs. Marion Blue Racers ===
2011 CIFL Championship Game: Marion Blue Racers at Cincinnati Commandos – Game summary

Quarter	1	2	3	4	Total
Blue Racers	0	13	3	13	29
Commandos	7	14	13	10	44

at Cincinnati Gardens, Cincinnati, Ohio

- Date: June 11
- Game time: 7:30 p.m. EDT

Game information

1st quarter

- Cincinnati - (6:17) Tyler Sheehan 1-yard rush, (Brandon Yingling kick), Cincinnati 7-0

2nd quarter

- Cincinnati - (12:57) Kyenes Mincy 9-yard pass from Tyler Sheehan (Brandon Yingling kick), Cincinnati 14-0
- Cincinnati - (6:15) James Frazier 49-yard fumble recovery (Brandon Yingling kick), Cincinnati 21-0
- Marion - (2:04) Christen Haywood 30-yard rush, (Tyler Lorenz kick), Cincinnati 21-7
- Marion - (0:00) Brandon Williams 3-yard pass from Josh Harris, (Tyler Lorenz kick failed), Cincinnati 21-13

3rd quarter

- Cincinnati - (11:19) George Murrey 6-yard pass from Tyler Sheehan (Brandon Yingling kick), Cincinnati 28-13
- Marion - (5:07) Tyler Lorenz 43-yard field goal, Cincinnati 28-16
- Cincinnati - (2:47) Greg Moore 2-yard rush, (Brandon Yingling kick failed), Cincinnati 34-16

4th quarter

- Marion - (12:37) Christen Haywood 1-yard rush, (Tyler Lorenz kick), Cincinnati 34-23
- Cincinnati - (7:45) Brandon Boehm 19-yard pass from Tyler Sheehan (Brandon Yingling kick), Cincinnati 41-23
- Marion - (4:14) Brandon Williams 3-yard pass from Josh Harris, (Christen Haywood rush failed), Cincinnati 41-29
- Cincinnati - (0:48) Brandon Yingling 33-yard field goal, Cincinnati 44-29

Passing

- Marion – Josh Harris: 4/14, 15 yards, 2 TD
- Cincinnati – Tyler Sheehan: 8/19, 93 yards, 3 TD

Rushing

- Marion – Christen Haywood: 18 att, 107 yards, 2 TD
- Cincinnati – Tyler Sheehan: 2 att, 28 yards, 1 TD

Receiving

- Marion – Brandon Williams: 2 rec, 6 yards, 2 TD
- Cincinnati – Brandon Boehm: 2 rec, 36 yards, 1 TD

== Media ==
The league launched the Gameday Center on its website that would allow followers to enjoy live stats for each game. Teams were also allowed to use local media to broadcast the teams under their own terms.

== Coaching changes ==
=== Pre-season ===
Team	2011 Coach	2010 Coach(es)	Reason for leaving	Story/accomplishments
Dayton Silverbacks	Derrick Shepard	Brian Wells	Took a job with the Cincinnati Commandos	Wells left to become the special teams coordinator for the Cincinnati Commandos after the 2010 season after compiling a 4–6 (.400) record in 1 year as the head coach. Shepard, who was the Dayton Silverbacks' head coach in 2009 before he was replaced prior to the 2010 regular season, after posting a 0-10 record. In 2010, he served as the line coach for the Silverbacks under Wells.

=== In-season ===
Team	2011 Coach	Interim	Reason for leaving	Story/Accomplishments
Port Huron Predators	Doug Warren	[Jason Lovelock, John Forti	Fired	Warren was fired before the season started for the Predators and Offensive Coordinator Jason Lovelock took over. On March 28, the Predators fired their second coach of the season as well as their director of operations. Head Coach Jason Lovelock was let go after Brusate said, "The players wanted something different." Brusate appointed offensive coordinator, John Forti, as the interim head coach.
Marion Blue Racers	Demetrius Ross	Ryan Terry	Personal reasons	After the Blue Racers got off to a 3-1 start, Demetrius Ross stepped down from his head coaching position, citing personal reasons. His defensive coordinator, Ryan Terry, took over as head coach, just 2 days before the Blue Racers played their first road game at the Dayton Silverbacks.

== Awards ==
=== Regular season awards ===
- CIFL Most Valuable Player - Tyler Sheehan QB, Cincinnati Commandos
- Offensive Player of the Year - Tyler Sheehan QB, Cincinnati Commandos
- Defensive Player of the Year - Chris Respress DB, Dayton Silverbacks
- Special Teams Player of the Year - Mike Tatum WR, Marion Blue Racers
- Coach of the Year - Ryan Terry, Marion Blue Racers

=== Players of the week ===
Week
Week	Offense	Defense	Special Teams
Week 1	Robert Height/Levi Raines (PH)	Ernie Smith/Ruben Gay (PH)	Rasko Apostolovski (PH)
Week 2	Josh Harris (MAR)	Torry Cornett (CIN)	Tyler Lorenz (MAR)
Week 3	George Murray (CIN)	Marcus Allen (MAR)	Mike Tatum (MAR)
Week 4	Tyler Sheehan (CIN)	Roger Sippio (PH)	Fred Cromartie (DAY)
Week 5	Josh Harris (MAR)	Bryan Williams (MAR)	Tyler Lorenz (MAR)
Week 6	Christen Haywood (MAR)	Ray Saunders (MAR)	Brandon Wogoman (CHI)
Week 7	Josh Harris (MAR)	James Spikes (DAY)	Fred Cromartie (DAY)
Week 8	Josh Harris (MAR)	Kurt James (CHI)	Mike Tatum (MAR)
Week 9	Jeremy Greenleaf (DAY)	Viterio Jones (DAY)	Julie Harshbarger (CHI)
Week 10	Tyler Sheehan(CIN)	James Cichon (CHI)	Fred Cromartie (DAY)
Week 11	George Murray(CIN)	Viterio Jones (DAY)	Brandon Yingling (CIN)
Week 12	Josh Harris (MAR)	Viterio Jones (DAY)	JaMarcus Walters (IND)
Week 13	George Murray (CIN)	Pernell Phillips/Wendell Brown (CIN)	JaMarcus Walters (IND)
Week 14	Tyler Sheehan (CIN)	Pernell Phillips (CIN)	Brandon Yingling (CIN)

2011 Continental Indoor Football League seasons
Chicago	Cincinnati	Dayton	Indianapolis	Marion	Port Huron
