= M. L. Harris =

American football player (born 1954)

No. 7, 83
- Position: Tight end

Personal information
- Born: January 16, 1954 (age 72); Columbus, Ohio, U.S.
- Listed height: 6 ft 5 in (1.96 m)
- Listed weight: 238 lb (108 kg)

Career information
- High school: Columbus North
- College: Tampa; Kansas State
- NFL draft: 1976: undrafted

Career history
- Hamilton Tiger-Cats (1976–1977); Toronto Argonauts (1978–1979); Cincinnati Bengals (1980–1985)

Career NFL statistics
- Receptions: 99
- Receiving yards: 1,369
- Receiving touchdowns: 10
- Stats at Pro Football Reference

Michael Lee Harris (born January 16, 1954) is an American former professional football player who was a tight end and on special teams for six seasons for the Cincinnati Bengals of the National Football League (NFL). He also played four seasons in the Canadian Football League (CFL). He is currently a pastor and an author.

Harris played college football for Kansas State Wildcats and was undrafted. He played two seasons in the CFL with the Hamilton Tiger-Cats in 1976-77 followed by two seasons with the Toronto Argonauts in 1978–79 before signing with the NFL's Cincinnati Bengals.

During his six NFL seasons, he totaled 99 receptions for 1,369 yards for a 13.8 yards-per-reception average and 10 touchdowns. His most productive season by far was in 1984 when, starting all 16 games, he caught 48 passes for 759 yards (15.8 yards per catch) and two touchdowns.

Harris played in Super Bowl XVI for the Bengals, where they lost 26–21 to the San Francisco 49ers.

Harris currently operates the M.L. Harris All Boys Academy that teaches life skills, academics, leadership and character as well as sports, in conjunction with the New Life Outreach Christian Center in Reynoldsburg, Ohio. He is the father of former Bowling Green State University standout, Josh Harris.
