= Josh Harris (quarterback) =

American football player (born 1982)

No. 15
- Position: Quarterback

Personal information
- Born: September 9, 1982 (age 44)
- Listed height: 6 ft 1 in (1.85 m)
- Listed weight: 245 lb (111 kg)

Career information
- High school: Westerville (OH) North
- College: Bowling Green (2000–2003)
- NFL draft: 2004: 6th round, 187th overall pick

Career history
- Baltimore Ravens (2004)*; Cleveland Browns (2004–2005); Calgary Stampeders (2005); New York Giants (2006)*; Columbus Destroyers (2007); Marion Blue Racers (2011–2012)
- * Offseason or practice squad member only

Awards and highlights
- 2003 Motor City Bowl MVP

Career CFL statistics
- Rushing attempts: 18
- Rushing yards: 40
- Stats at CFL.ca

Career AFL statistics
- Total tackles: 2
- Stats at ArenaFan.com

Joshua Harris (born September 9, 1982) is a former professional American football quarterback.

== College career ==
During his two years as a starter at Bowling Green State University, he led the Falcons to consecutive finishes in the top 25 nationally. During his senior season, he led the Falcons to a victory over Northwestern University in the Motor City Bowl. Harris finished his college career as the school leader in rushing touchdowns (43), and is third in passing yards (7,503) and passing touchdowns. At the time, he and Antwaan Randle El were the only two quarterbacks to have ever thrown for 40 touchdowns and rushed for 40 touchdowns in their careers in NCAA Division I FBS history.

He was the first quarterback to help popularize Urban Meyer's spread option offense.

=== Statistics ===
Season	Team	Games			Passing								Rushing				Receiving			
Season	Team	GP	GS	Record (Note: Accounts for only GS as a QB. On 10/14/2000, Harris started at RB against Miami (OH).)	Cmp	Att	Pct	Yds	Y/A	TD	Int	Rtg	Att	Yds	Avg	TD	Rec	Yds	Avg	TD
2000	Bowling Green	6	2	0–1	23	48	47.9	243	5.1	0	2	82.1	69	292	4.2	2	1	0	0.0	0
2001	Bowling Green	10	4	4–0	81	133	60.9	1,022	7.7	9	3	143.3	126	614	4.9	8	1	14	14.0	1
2002	Bowling Green	12	12	9–3	198	353	56.1	2,425	6.9	19	11	125.3	186	737	4.0	20	3	51	17.0	2
2003	Bowling Green	14	14	11–3	325	484	65.8	3,813	7.7	27	12	143.8	215	830	3.9	13	1	48	48.0	1
Career		42	32	24–7	627	1,028	61.0	7,503	5.4	55	28	134.5	596	2,473	4.1	43	6	113	18.8	4

== Professional career ==
Pre-draft measurables
Height	Weight	Arm length	Hand span	40-yard dash	20-yard shuttle	Three-cone drill	Vertical jump	Broad jump	Wonderlic
6 ft 1 1/2 in (1.87 m)	238 lb (108 kg)	31 1/2 in (0.80 m)	8 7/8 in (0.23 m)	4.78 s	4.20 s	7.03 s	32.0 in (0.81 m)	10 ft 3 in (3.12 m)	25
All values from NFL Combine/Pro Day

=== Baltimore Ravens ===
Josh was originally drafted in the sixth round by the Baltimore Ravens in the 2004 NFL draft.

=== Cleveland Browns ===
After a brief stay in Baltimore he went on to the Cleveland Browns for 2 seasons before he was released.

=== Calgary Stampeders ===
He signed with the Canadian Football League's Calgary Stampeders, in 2005. He had 5 carries for 40 yards, and never had a pass attempt.

=== New York Giants ===
He was later picked up by the New York Giants. On July 7, 2006, he was released by the Giants.

=== Columbus Destroyers ===
He also played for the Arena Football League's Columbus Destroyers. He made a pivotal play in the AFL conference championship against the Georgia Force, with a key block that allowed for the winning score.

=== Retirement ===
He retired from professional football in 2008 to focus on his advertising company, Joshua1and5.

=== Marion Blue Racers ===
He came out of retirement in 2011 to play for the Marion Blue Racers. In their first game, he ran for the game-winning touchdown with 27 seconds remaining. It was also the expansion franchise's first victory. He led his team to an 8–2 regular season record and a 2nd-place finish in the CIFL. He also led them to the CIFL Championship Game, where they lost 44–29 to the Cincinnati Commandos. Harris has re-signed with the Blue Racers, who have moved to the United Indoor Football League for the 2012 season.

=== Statistics ===
Through end of the 2011 season, Harris' Indoor Football statistics are as follows:

			Passing								Rushing
Season	Team	GP	Att	Comp	Pct	Yds	TD	INT	Att	Yds	TD
2011	Marion	11	172	88	51.2	929	28	11	65	240	11
2012	Marion	0	0	0	0	0	0	0	0	0	0
	Totals	11	172	88	51.2	929	28	11	65	240	11

== Personal life ==
He is the son of former NFL player M.L. Harris. He is married to his wife Tamara and they have 2 sons. Currently, Josh is the president and CEO of Freedom Direct LLC a final expense life insurance call center.

== See also ==
- List of Arena Football League and National Football League players
