= Marion Blue Racers =

Professional indoor football team in Ohio, US (2010–15)

Logo

General information
- Founded: 2010
- Folded: 2015
- Headquartered: Marion, Ohio at the Veterans Memorial Coliseum
- Colors: Blue, Light Blue, Red, White

Personnel
- Owners: LaMonte Coleman; Shavonne Coleman
- General manager: LaMonte Coleman
- Head coach: Demetrius Ross (2011); Ryan Terry (2011); Lorenzo Styles (2012); Marc Huddleston (2012, 2013, 2014); Martino Theus (2013); LaMonte Coleman (2013, 2014, 2015); Rick Kranz (2015)
- President: LaMonte Coleman

Team history
- Marion Blue Racers (2011–2015)

Home fields
- Veterans Memorial Coliseum (2011–2015)

League / conference affiliations
- Continental Indoor Football League (2011) United Indoor Football League (2012): Northern Conference (2012); Continental Indoor Football League (2013–2014): South Division (2014); X-League Indoor Football (2015)

Championships
- Division championships: 1: 2014

Playoff appearances (3)
- 2011, 2012, 2014

The Marion Blue Racers were a professional indoor football team based in Marion, Ohio. The Blue Racers began play as an expansion team in the Continental Indoor Football League (CIFL) in 2011, before moving to the United Indoor Football League (UIFL) for the 2012 season. The Blue Racers returned to the CIFL in 2013. The team had announced that it would be joining the Xtreme Indoor Football League (XIFL) for the 2014, but later re-signed with the CIFL. During the 2015 season, the Blue Racers played as members of X-League Indoor Football.

The Blue Racers were the second indoor football team to be based in Marion, the first being CIFL charter members the Marion Mayhem from 2006 to 2010. The first owners of the Blue Racers were LaMonte and Shavonne Coleman. The Blue Racers played their home games at the Veterans Memorial Coliseum.

== Franchise history ==
=== 2011 season ===
The franchise couldn't have asked for a more exciting start than their first game on March 5, 2011. Marion entered the 4th quarter trailing 37–23 to the Port Huron Predators. They started their comeback by scoring a touchdown with 10:31 left in the game. Mike Tatum caught a nine-yard touchdown pass from Josh Harris and Tyler Lorenz added the extra point, cutting Port Huron's lead was cut to 37–30. With 3:27 left in the game, Harris ran in from three yards out to tie the game. The game winning score came on an eight-yard run by Harris with 27 seconds to play. Port Huron quarterback Jim Roth was intercepted by Bryan Williams as time expired to secure the victory. On April 2, 2011, the Blue Racers set a CIFL record with 8 rushing touchdowns in a single game, against the Indianapolis Enforcers. After the Blue Racers got off to a 3–1 start, Demetrius Ross stepped down from his head coaching position, citing personal reasons. His Defensive Coordinator, Ryan Terry took over as head coach, just 2 days before the Blue Racers played their first road game at the Dayton Silverbacks. The Blue Racers went on to an 8–2 regular season record, losing twice to the Cincinnati Commandos. The team defeated the Dayton Silverbacks 53–18 in the league Semi-Finals, before being defeated by the Commandos again in the 2011 CIFL Championship Game 44–29.

=== 2012 season ===
On July 5, 2011, the Blue Racers announced they were leaving the CIFL to join the Ultimate Indoor Football League. The Blue Racers were added as a member of the Northern Conference, re-uniting with, their arch-rivals, the Cincinnati Commandos. On August 17, 2011, Lorenzo Styles was named the 3rd head coach in franchise history. In February, team CEO and General Manager, LaMonte Coleman, took a coaching position with the Pittsburgh Power of the Arena Football League. The following day, Ryan Sawyer was named the team's interim general manager while Coleman was coaching in Pittsburgh. On March 30, 2012, Styles resigned as the head coach of the Blue Racers after compiling a 3–1 record, citing personal reason as the reason for his resignation. Offensive Coordinator Marc Huddleston, took over as the team's head coach. The team remained a strong pipeline for the Pittsburgh Power, as both the team's kickers, Trey Kramer and Seth Burkholder, signed with the team. The Blue Racers finished the season with a 7–4 record, earning the 3rd seed in the UIFL North playoff. The team traveled to play the second seeded Erie Explosion, where the game was played at a high school field, where the team had built walls for the playing field. It is the first time an indoor football game, has been played outdoors. The Explosion went on to defeat the Blue Racers 56–47, after the Blue Racers had led 22–0 early in the game.

=== 2013 season ===
The Blue Racers announced they would be leaving the UIFL following the conclusion of the 2012 season. A few days later, the franchise returned to the CIFL. On September 18, 2012, the Blue Racers name, CEO and General Manager, LaMonte Coleman, as the team's 5th head coach in franchise history. Three weeks before the start of the season, the Blue Racers announced that offensive coordinator, Martino Theus, had been promoted to head coach for the 2013 season. Theus was later removed as the head coach in Marion after a 1–4 start. Marc Huddleston finish the season as the Blue Racers head coach, as the team finish the season 2–8. Every home game of the 2013 season was shown on WMNO Marion TV 22, available via broadcast on UHF channel 22 and on Time Warner Cable channel 3 (Marion only).

=== 2014 season ===
In May 2013, the Blue Racers announced that they were leaving the CIFL again, this time to join the Xtreme Indoor Football League. The league was supposed to be run by Blue Racers owner, LaMonte Coleman. However, in August 2013, the Blue Racers re-signed with the CIFL to a multi-year contract. Coleman has hired Marc Huddleston as the 2014 Head Coach and Director of Football Operations. After a 2–1 start, the Blue Racers announced that owner LaMonte Coleman would be taking over as the team's head coach. The Blue Racers recovered from a down season in 2013, by winning the CIFL's new South Division title, clinching them homefield advantage in the South Division playoffs. The Blue Racers faced off against the Northern Kentucky River Monsters in the South Division title game and won 56–40. With the win over Northern Kentucky, the Blue Racers clinched their 2nd berth in the CIFL Championship Game. After 3 quarters of play, the Blue Racers were tied at 26 with the Erie Explosion in the 2014 CIFL Championship Game when Aaron Smentanka found Evan Twombly for a score. After Marion turned over the ball on downs, Richard Stokes scored again for the Explosion, which turned out to be the final score of the game, making the game 38–26.

=== 2015 season ===
In October 2014, as the CIFL disbanded, Marion announced they would be joining the X-League Indoor Football. After a sluggish 2–2 start, Coleman fired Rick Kranz as head coach, and once again named himself as the interim head coach of the Blue Racers.

=== 2016 season ===
On August 23, 2015, the Blue Racers announced that they would rejoin the revived CIFL, which became a member of the Indoor Football Alliance. On September 10, 2015, the Blue Racers changed their plans and instead joined American Indoor Football. However, on January 22, 2016, the Blue Racers announced that they had suspended operations for the 2016 season due to lack of sponsors. On May 28, 2016, the Blue Racers' owners, LaMonte and Shavonne Coleman, announced they had moved out of the area to pursue other opportunities and put the team and all its assets up for sale.

== Players ==
Marion Blue Racers Roster
Quarterbacks: Currently vacant; Running backs: Currently vacant; Wide receivers: Currently vacant	Offensive linemen: Currently vacant; Defensive linemen: Currently vacant	Linebackers: Currently vacant; Defensive backs: Currently vacant; Kickers: Currently vacant	Injured reserve: Currently vacant; Exempt list: Currently vacant; Rookies in italics Roster updated September 17, 2015; 0 Active, 0 Inactive

=== Awards and honors ===
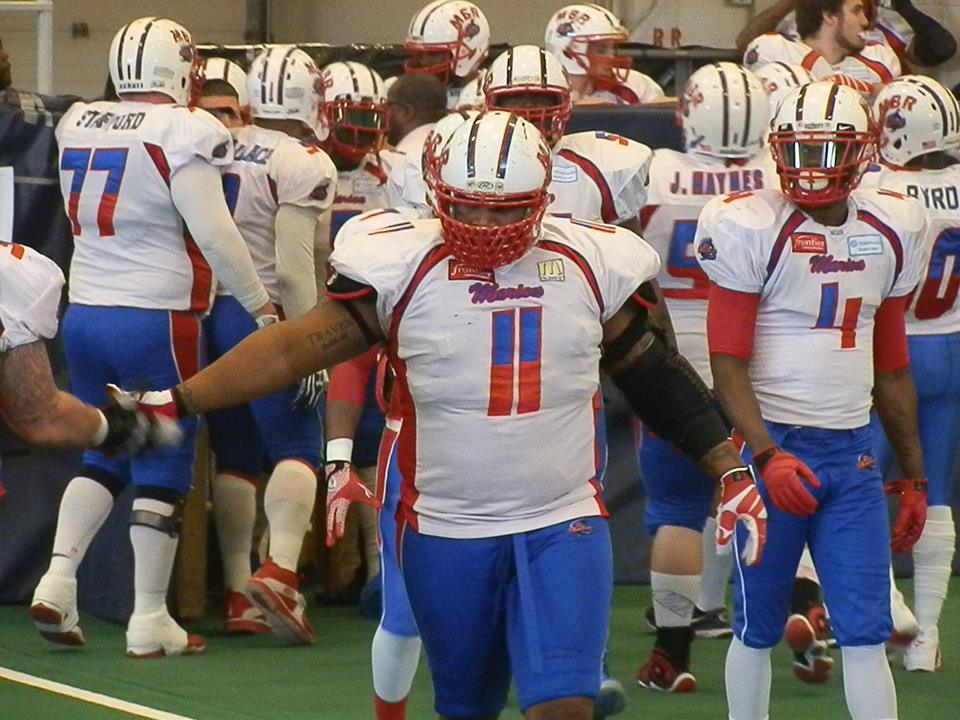
2014 CIFL MVP, Thomas McKenzie.

The following is a list of all Marion Blue Racers players who won end of the season league awards.

Season	Player	Position	Award
2011	Mike Tatum	WR	Special Teams Player of the Year
2014	Thomas McKenzie	DE	CIFL MVP

=== All-League players ===
The following Blue Racers players were named to All-League Teams:

- WR Mike Tatum (1), Bryceson Lawrence (1)
- OL Robert Price (2), Kris Stafford (1), William Haase (1)
- DL Thomas McKenzie (2), James Spikes (1)
- LB Ray Saunders (1), Lambert Budzinski (1)
- DB Marcus Dorsey (1), Steve Witherspoon (1)
- K Trey Kramer (1)

== Head coaches ==
Name	Term	Regular season				Playoffs		Awards
Name	Term	W	L	T	Win%	W	L	Awards
Demetrius Ross	2011	3	1	0	.750	0	0	
Ryan Terry	2011	5	1	0	.833	1	1	CIFL Coach of the Year
Lorenzo Styles	2012	3	1	0	.750	0	0	
Marc Huddleston	2012, 2013,2014	9	8	0	.529	0	1	
Martino Theus	2013	1	4	0	.200	0	0	
LaMonte Coleman	2013, 2014, 2015	9	6	0	.600	1	1	2014 CIFL Coach of the Year
Rick Kranz	2015	2	2	0	.500	0	0	

== Season-by-season results ==
League champions	Conference champions	Division champions	Wild card berth	League leader

Season	Team	League	Conference	Division	Regular season				Postseason results
Season	Team	League	Conference	Division	Finish	Wins	Losses	Ties	Postseason results
2011	2011	CIFL			2nd	8	2	0	Won CIFL semifinals (Silverbacks) 53–53; Lost CIFL Championship Game (Commandos) 29–44
2012	2012	UIFL	North		3rd	7	4	0	Lost UIFL quarterfinals (Explosion) 47–56
2013	2013	CIFL			8th	2	8	0	
2014	2014	CIFL		South	1st	8	2	0	Won South Division Championship (River Monsters) 56–40; Lost CIFL Championship Game (Explosion) 26–38
2015	2015	X-League			6th	5	3	0	
Totals						30	19	0	All-time regular season record (2011–2015)
Totals						2	3	-	All-time postseason record (2011–2015)
Totals						32	22	0	All-time regular season and postseason record (2011–2015)
