= Veterans Memorial Coliseum (Marion, Ohio) =

Multi-purpose arena in Marion, Ohio

Coordinates: 40.604351°N 83.124415°W

- Interactive map of Veterans Memorial Coliseum
- Location: 220 East Fairground St., Marion, OH 43302
- Owner: Marion County
- Operator: Latisha Lewis
- Capacity: 3,200 Permanent Seats; 5,500 Maximum Capacity

Construction
- Groundbreaking: 1949
- Opened: 1950
- Cost: $100,000 (Around $1.05 million in 2018)
- Builder: Marion Contracting Corps Builders

Tenants
- Marion Barons (IHL) (1953–1954); Toledo-Marion Mercurys (IHL) (1955–1956); Marion Mayhem (GLIFL/CIFL) (2006–2010); Marion Blue Racers (UIFL/CIFL/XLIF) (2011–2015); Ohio Legends (AAL2/AAL) (2026–present)

The Veterans Memorial Coliseum is a 3,200-seat multi-purpose arena, in Marion, Ohio. It was built in 1949.

It was home to the Marion Blue Racers indoor football team of X-League Indoor Football.

The arena was formerly home to the minor league professional ice hockey team during the 1953-54 International Hockey League season. The Toledo Mercurys played part of the 1955–56 season at the arena, operating as the "Toledo-Marion Mercurys." The most recent former tenant was the Marion Mayhem, which folded in 2010, after 5 years of participating in the CIFL (known as the Great Lakes Indoor Football League during its inaugural season).

The Ohio Junior High wrestling championships were held at the arena.
