= Port Huron Predators =

Michigan-based Indoor Football Team

Logo

General information
- Founded: 2010
- Folded: 2011
- Headquartered: McMorran Arena in Port Huron, Michigan
- Colors: Vegas Gold, Black, White

Personnel
- Owner: Rachael Brusate
- Head coach: John Forti

Team history
- Port Huron Predators (2011)

Home fields
- McMorran Arena (2011)

League / conference affiliations
- Continental Indoor Football League (2011)

The Port Huron Predators were a professional Indoor Football team based in Port Huron, Michigan. The team was a member of the Continental Indoor Football League (CIFL). The Predators joined the CIFL in 2011 as an expansion team. The Predators were the second indoor football team to be based in Port Huron, the first being CIFL charter members and inaugural champions the Port Huron Pirates (2006–2007). The Owner of the Predators was Rachel Brusate. The Predators played their home games at the McMorran Arena.

== Franchise history ==
=== 2011 season ===
On February 26, 2011, the Predators won their first game in franchise history, with a 69–12 victory over the visiting Indianapolis Enforcers. They got off to a quick start after a brief scare and never looked back. After the Enforcers brought back the opening kick-off to the Predators nine yard line, the Port Huron defense stepped up and picked off the first play from scrimmage. It was the first of seven interceptions by the Predators' defense. On the next play, Predators back-up quarterback Jim Roth, who was filling in for Damon Dowdell, found Robert Height for a 41-yard score to put the team ahead for good. The Predators carried the 7–0 into the second quarter and led 21–6 at the half. In the second half, the flood gates opened as the Enforcers, a first-year team travel team, showed their inexperience with several mistakes. After several interceptions and fumbles, Port Huron took a commanding 47–6 lead into the third quarter before going on to win by the lopsided score. On March 28, the Predators fired their second coach of the season as well as their director of operations. Head Coach Jason Lovelock was let go after Brusate said, "The players wanted something different." As for Director of Operations, Julie Crankshaw, Brusate cited, "We had different ideas on what should be done. She was fired. She didn't live up to her contract; she didn't fulfill it. So there is no need to fulfill my end." Brusate appointed Offensive Coordinator, John Forti, as the Interim Head Coach. On April 2, Forti lead the team into his first game as Head Coach, and lead the team to a 29–45 defeat to the Chicago Knights, who hadn't won a game in over 2 seasons. The Predators announced on April 28, 2011 that they would be forfeiting the rest of the season.

== Final roster ==
Port Huron Predators roster
Quarterbacks: 10 Adam Hurst; 7 Jim Roth; Offensive backs: 5 Levi Raines; Receivers: 6 Devon Daniels; 24 Daryl Frager; 4 Robert Height; 23 Jeremiah McLauren; 1 Terry Mitchell	Offensive linemen: 31 Quentin Celano; 55 Rodney Hamilton; 92 Eric Knott; 76 Antonio Martin; Defensive linemen: 3 Jeff Dembowske; 44 Mike Matyniak; 91 Jim Strafford; 90 Antonio Young	Linebackers: 20 Anthony Calamita; 8 Roger Sippio; Defensive backs: 9 Ruben Gay; 17 Darnell Hood; 2 Ernie Smith; Kickers: 22 Chris Tatti	Inactive: -- Rasko Apostolovski K; -- Rondell Biggs DL; -- Damon Dowdell QB; -- Neal Duaul OL; -- Eze Ejelanu; -- Anthony Gay WR; -- Kenneth Hamilton OL; -- Justin McKinney DB; -- Evan McWhite WR; -- Gino Panza DL; 24 Andre Raines WR; 10 Calvin Toliver; Injured Reserve: currently vacant'; rookies in italics; Updated 2011-04-02; 22 Active, 12 Inactive

== Head coaches ==
Name	Term	Regular season				Playoffs		Awards
Name	Term	W	L	T	Win%	W	L	Awards
Jason Lovelock	2011	2	1	0	.667	0	0	
John Forti	2011	0	3	0	.000	0	0	

== Season-by-season ==
Season records
Season	W	L	T	Finish	Playoff results
Port Huron Predators (CIFL)
2011	2	8	0	5th	--
Totals	2	8	0	(including playoffs)	
