= List of concert halls =

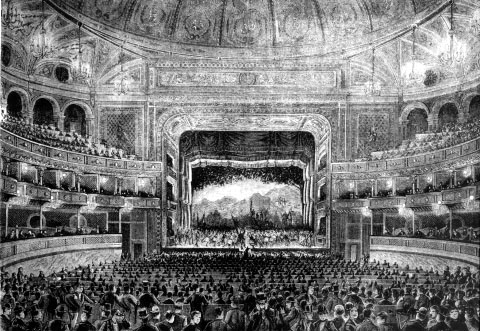
Teatro Dal Verme, Milan c. 1875

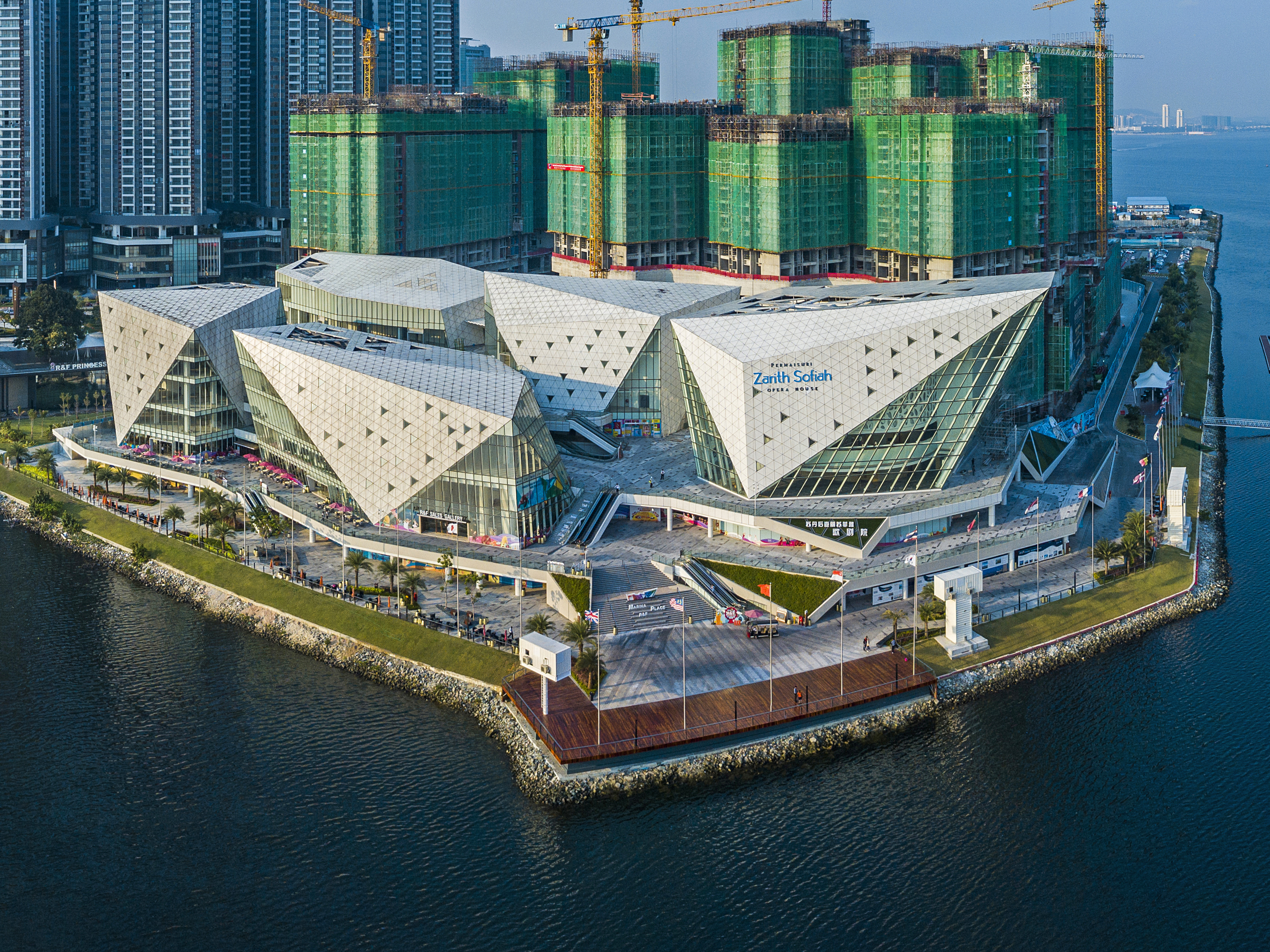
Permaisuri Zarith Sofiah Opera House in Johor Bahru, Malaysia

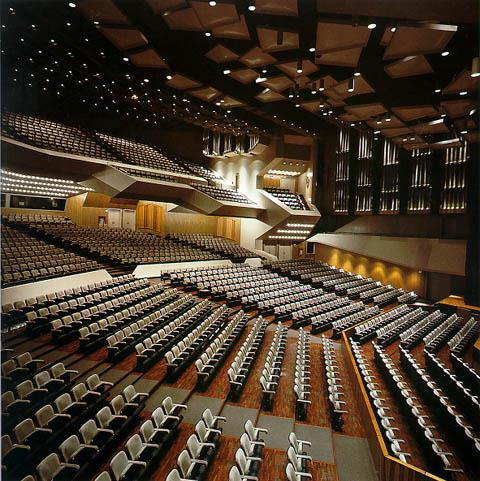
Ríos Reyna Hall, Teresa Carreño Cultural Complex, Caracas

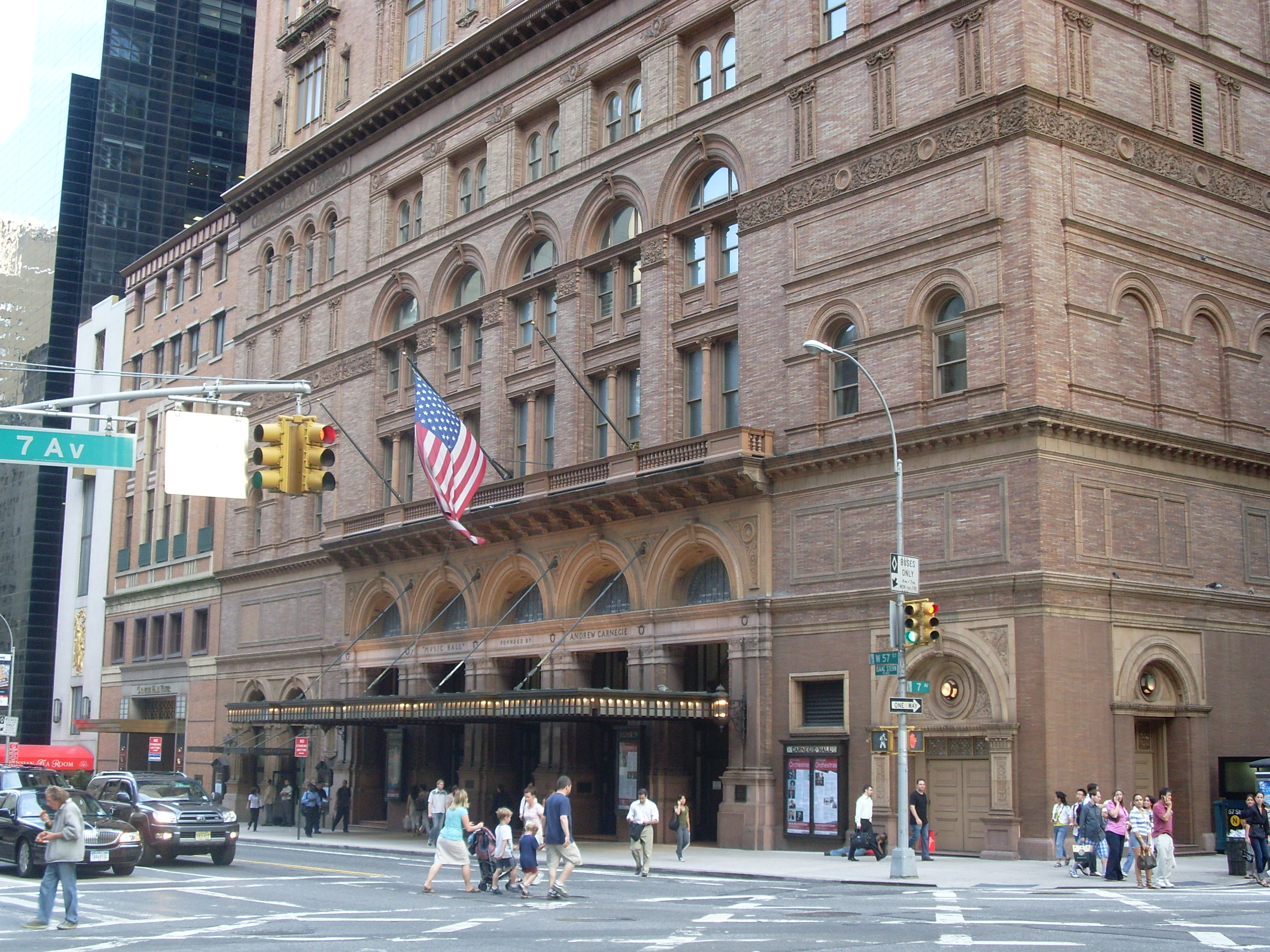
Carnegie Hall, New York City

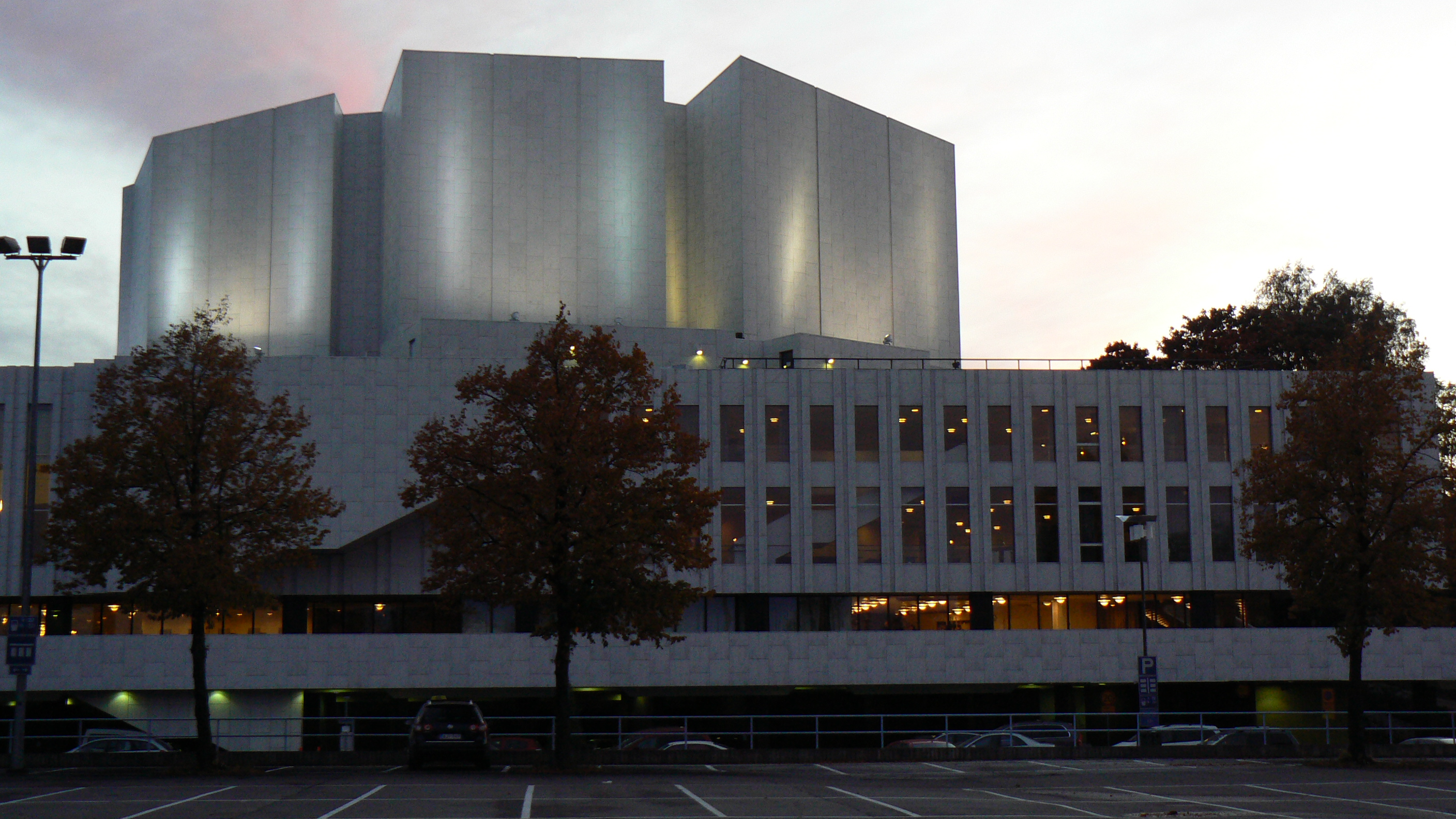
Finlandia Hall, Helsinki

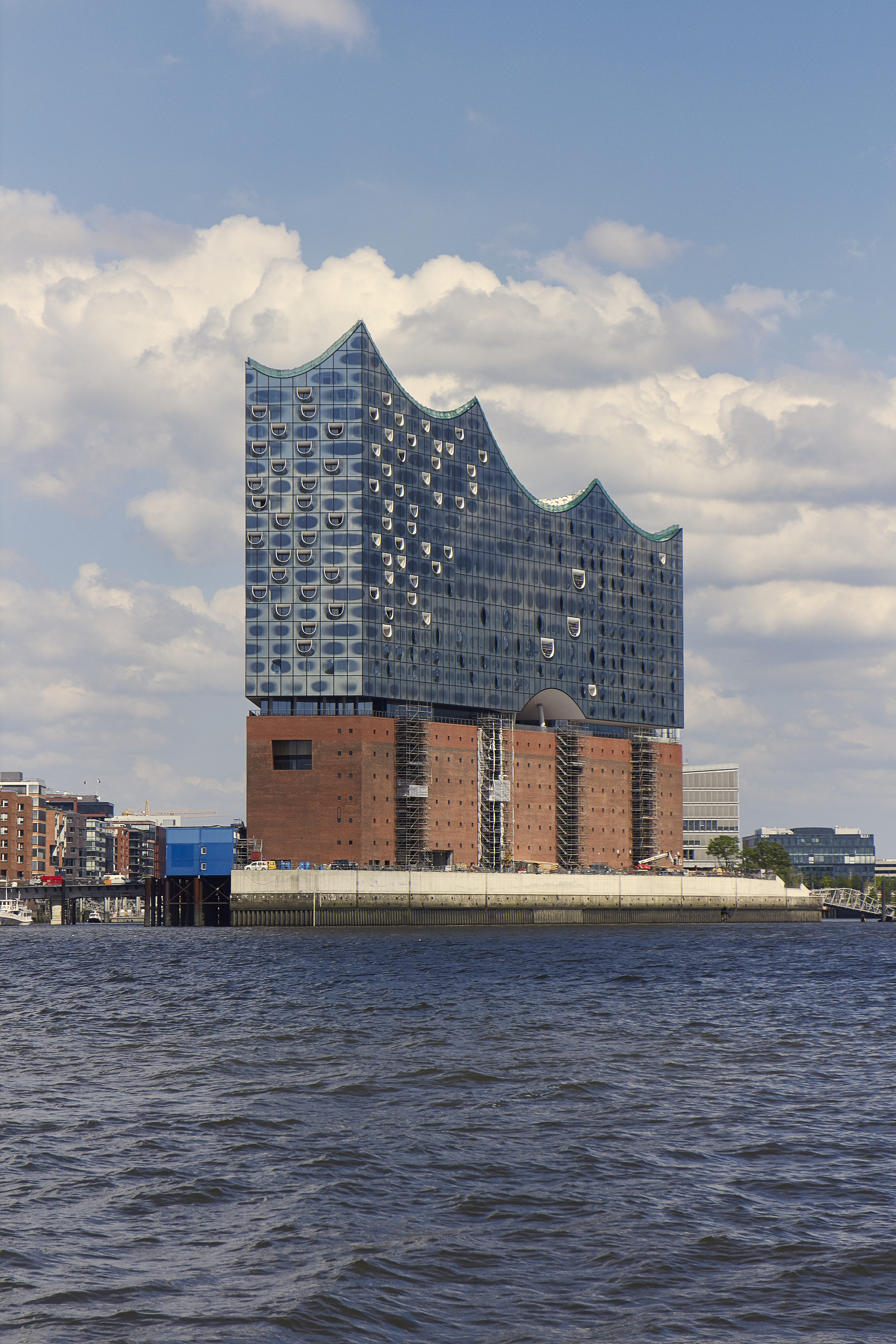
Elbphilharmonie, Hamburg

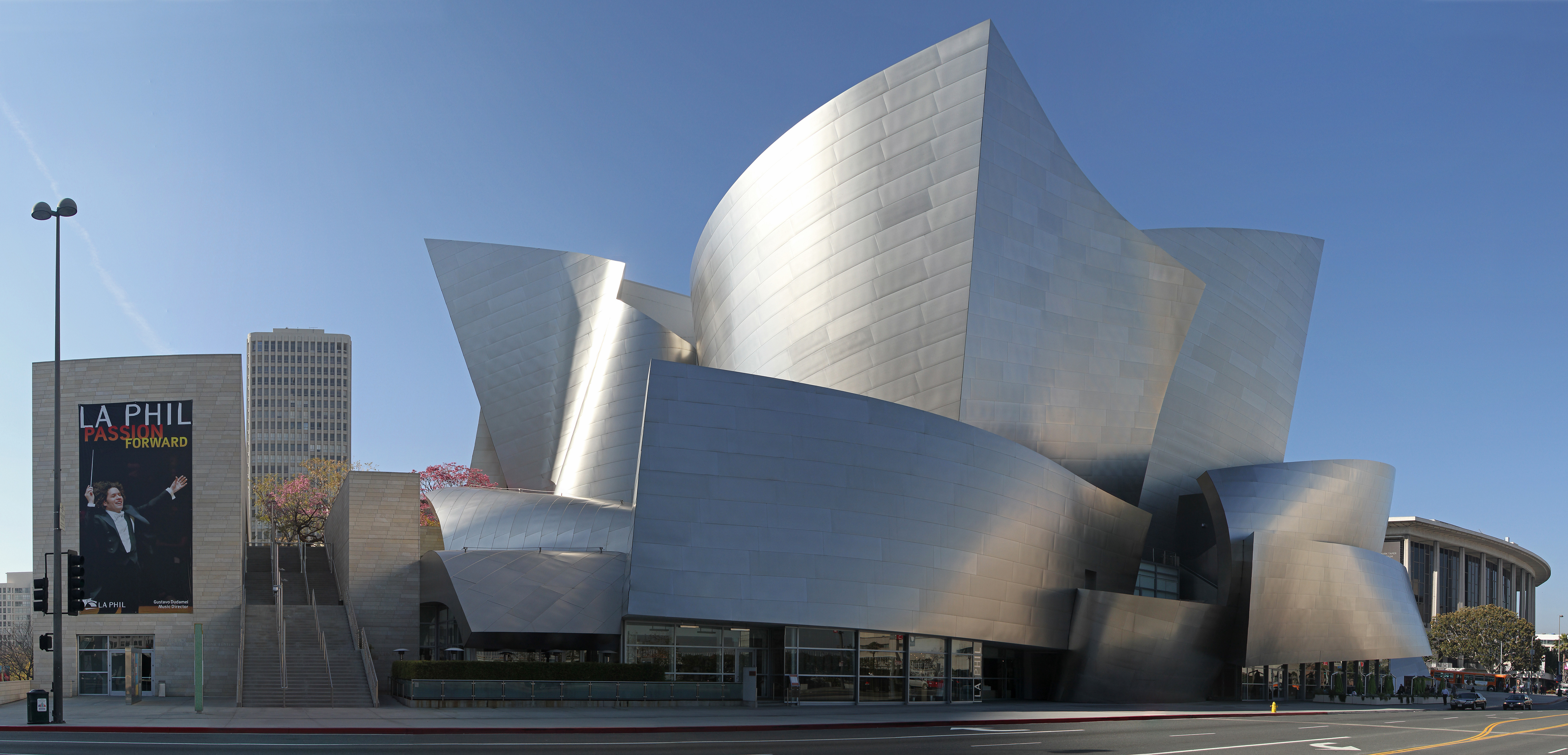
Walt Disney Concert Hall, Los Angeles

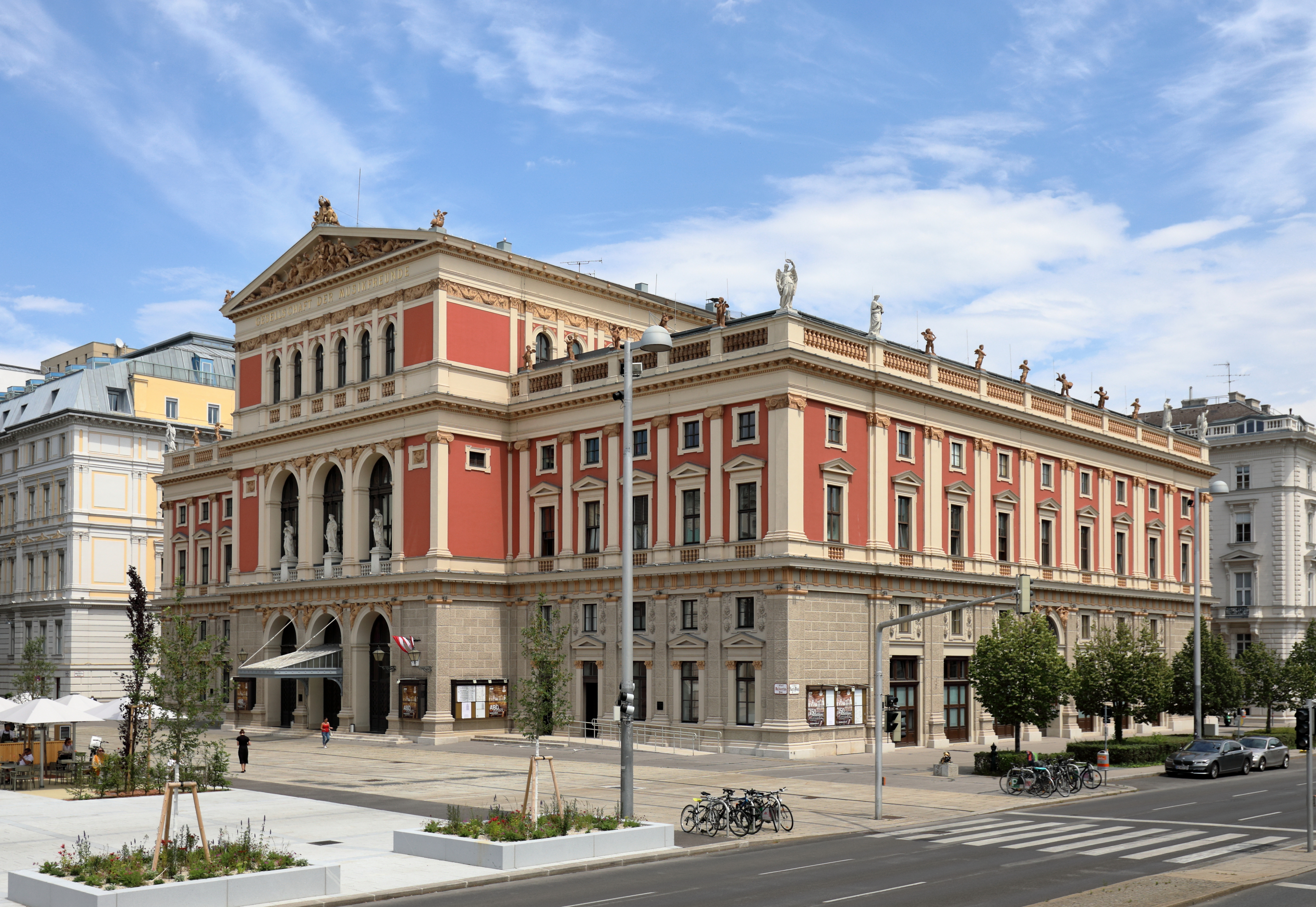
Musikverein, Vienna

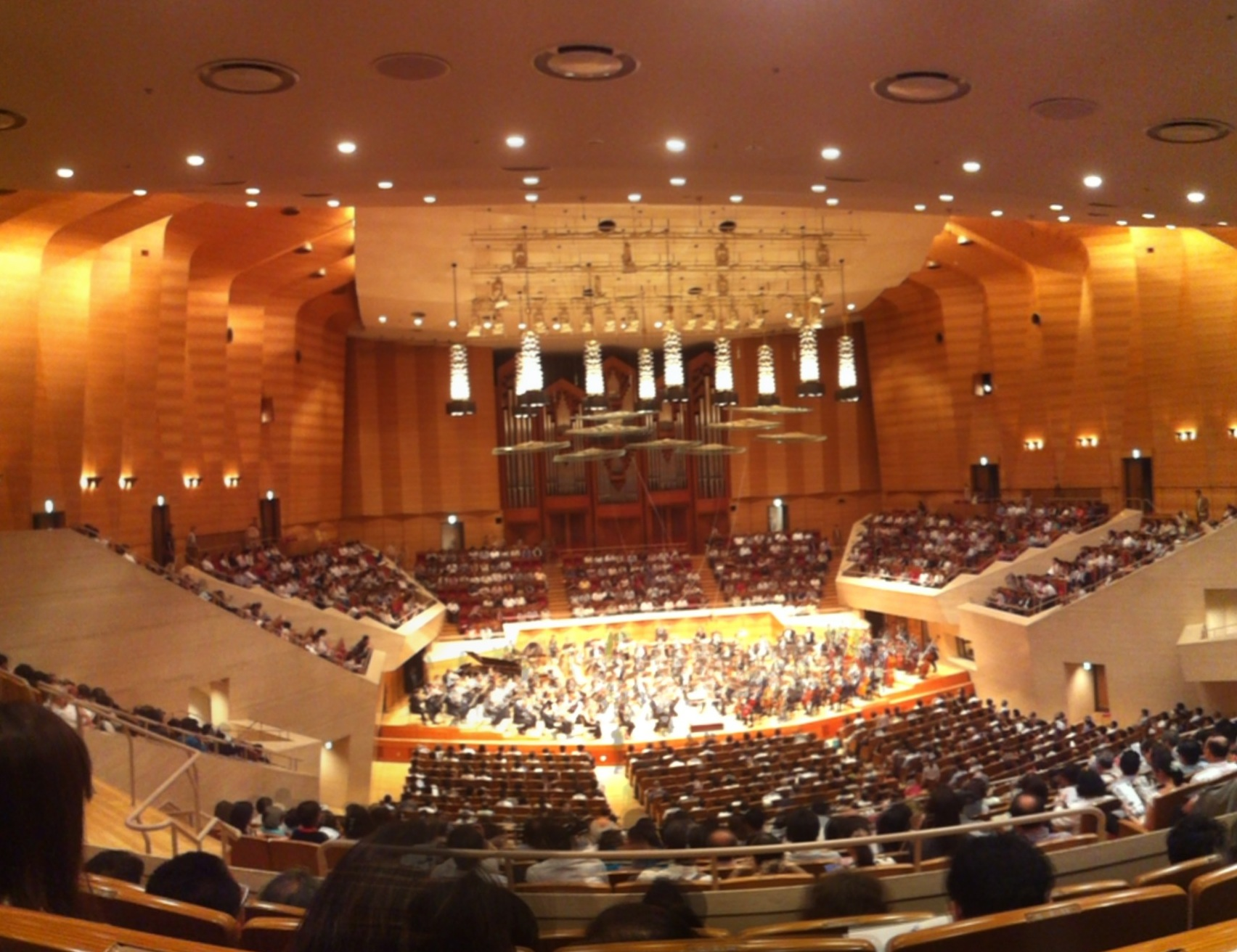
Suntory Hall, Tokyo

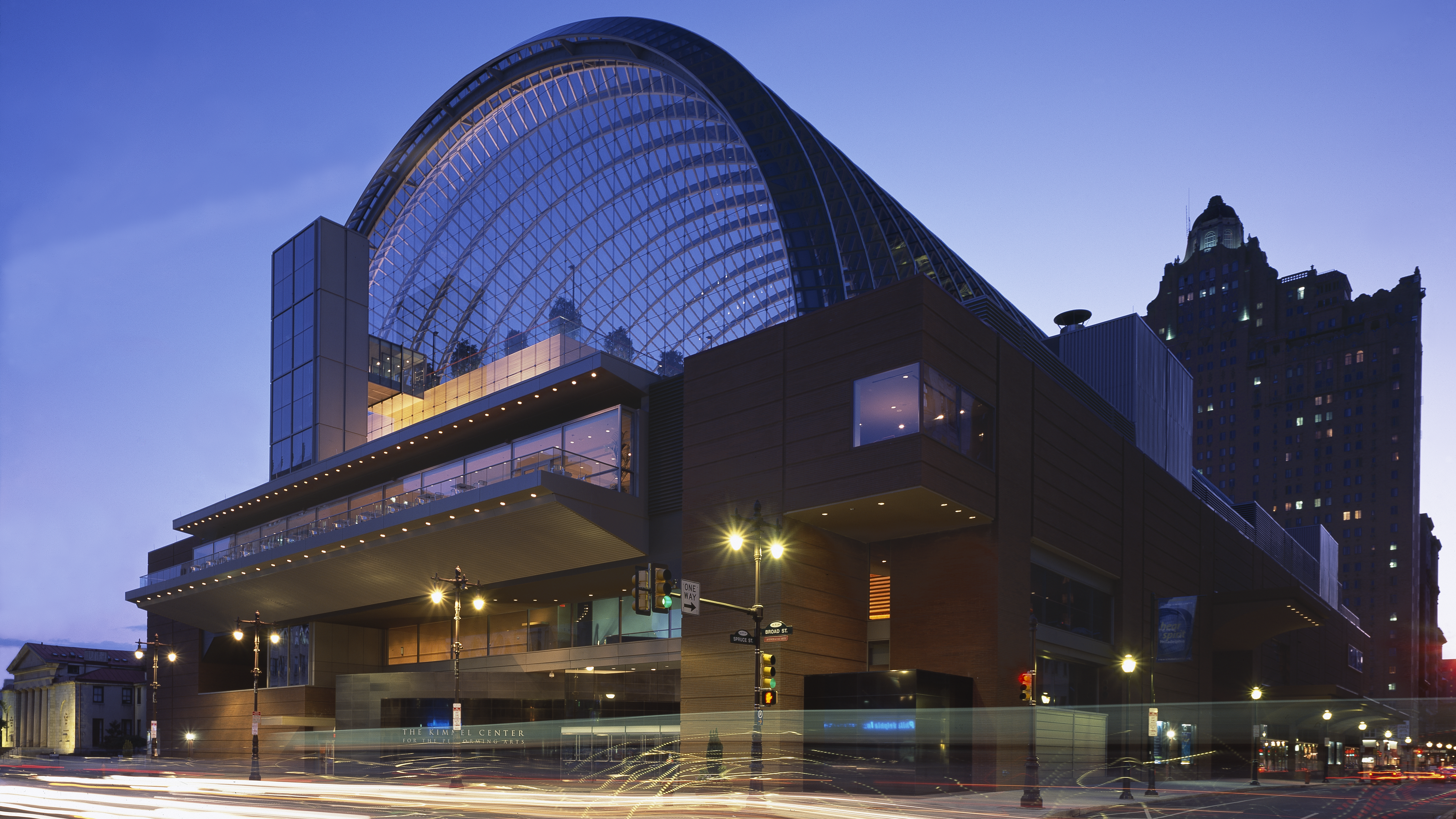
Kimmel Center for the Performing Arts, Philadelphia

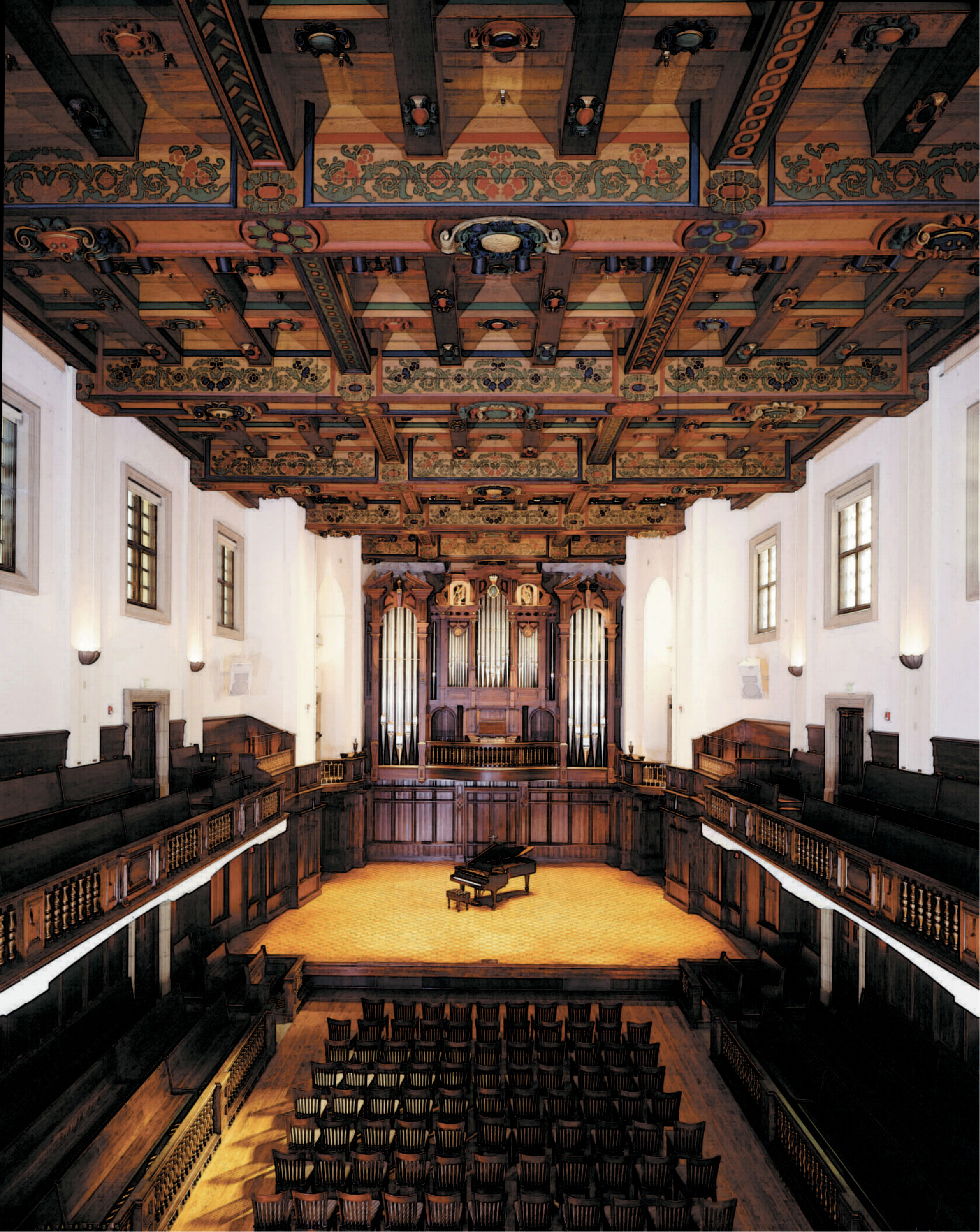
Bridges Hall of Music, Claremont, California

A concert hall is a cultural building with a stage that serves as a performance venue and an auditorium filled with seats.

This list does not include other venues such as sports stadia, dramatic theatres or convention centres that may occasionally be used for concerts.

The list is organised alphabetically by geo-political region or continent and then by country within each region.

== Africa ==
=== Egypt ===
Location	Venue	Room	Date built	Seats	Resident organizations
Cairo	Cairo Opera House	Main Hall	1988	1,300	Cairo Symphony Orchestra
Alexandria	Alexandria Opera House	Main Hall	1918	1,000	

=== Morocco ===
Location	Venue	Room	Date Built	Seats	Resident Organisations
Casablanca	Grand Théâtre de Casablanca			2,700	
El Jadida	Théâtre Afifi			1,000	
Marrakesh	Théâtre Royal			1,200	
Mohammedia	Théâtre Abderrahim Bouabid			600	
Oujda	Théâtre Med VI Oujda			1,200	
Rabat	Théâtre national Mohammed-V		1962	1,010	
Rabat	Grand Théâtre de Rabat			1,949	
Taza	Théâtre La Coupole			600	

=== South Africa ===
Location	Venue	Room	Date built	Seats	Resident organisations
Bloemfontein	Performing Arts Centre of the Free State	Sand du Plessis Theatre	1985	964	
Bloemfontein	University of the Free State	Odeion Auditorium		390	Free State Symphony Orchestra
Cape Town	Artscape Theatre Centre (formerly Nico Malan Theatre)	Opera House	1971	1,487	Cape Town Philharmonic Orchestra
Cape Town	Artscape Theatre Centre (formerly Nico Malan Theatre)	Auditorium	1971	540	
Cape Town	Artscape Theatre Centre (formerly Nico Malan Theatre)	Arena Theatre	1971	140	
Cape Town	Baxter Theatre Centre	Concert Hall	1977	638	UCT Symphony Orchestra
Cape Town	Cape Town City Hall	City Hall	1905	1,096	Cape Town Philharmonic Orchestra
Cape Town	Hugo Lambrechts Music Centre	Auditorium	1986	465	
Durban	Durban City Hall	City Hall	1910	2,000	KwaZulu-Natal Philharmonic Orchestra
Durban	Durban Music School	Werner Dannewitz Concert Hall	2014	400	KwaZulu-Natal Youth Wind Band
Makhanda	1820 Settlers National Monument	Guy Butler Theatre	1974	939	
Hilton	Memorial Hall	Concert Hall	2007	350	
Johannesburg	Joburg Theatre Complex (formerly Johannesburg Civic Theatre)	The Mandela	1962	1,069	Johannesburg Festival Orchestra
Johannesburg	University of the Witwatersrand Education Campus	Linder Auditorium		1,060	Johannesburg Philharmonic Orchestra
Johannesburg	University of the Witwatersrand East Campus	Chris Seabrooke Music Hall	2022	180	
Port Elizabeth	Feather Market Centre	Central Hall	1885	1,187	Eastern Cape Philharmonic Orchestra
Port Elizabeth	PE Opera house	Concert Hall	1892	598	
South African State Theatre	Opera		1981	1,300	
South African State Theatre	Drama		1981	640	
University of Pretoria	Aula		1958	1,012	
University of Pretoria	Musaion		1960	500	University of Pretoria Symphony Orchestra
University of South Africa		Dr. Miriam Makeba Concert Hall		270	
University of South Africa		Enoch Sontonga Hall (formerly Sunnyside Campus Hall)	1909	410	
University of South Africa		ZK Matthews Great Hall		970	
Stellenbosch	University of Stellenbosch	Endler Hall	1978	556	University of Stellenbosch Symphony Orchestra
Stellenbosch	University of Stellenbosch	Fismer Hall	1978	200	

== Asia ==
=== Armenia ===
Location	Venue	Room	Date built	Seats	Resident organizations
Yerevan	Yerevan Opera Theatre	Aram Khachaturian Concert Hall	1933	1,300	Armenian Philharmonic Orchestra, Yerevan International Music Festival
Yerevan	Yerevan Opera Theatre	Alexander Spendiaryan National Academic Theater of Opera and Ballet	1933	1,200	Spendiaryan National Theater of Opera and ballet
Yerevan	Komitas Chamber Music House	Chamber Music Hall	1979	330	National Chamber Orchestra of Armenia, Hover Chamber Choir, National Chamber Choir of Armenia, Yerevan Chamber Choir, Tagharan Ensemble, National Ensemble of Soloists

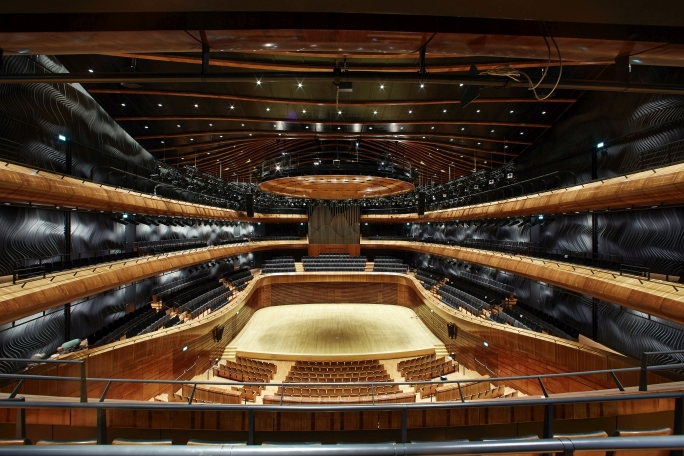
NOSPR concert hall, Katowice, Poland

=== Azerbaijan ===
Location	Venue	Room	Date built	Seats	Resident organizations
Baku	Azerbaijan State Academic Opera and Ballet Theatre		1911	1,800	
Baku	Azerbaijan State Philharmonic Hall		1912	1,710	Azerbaijan State Philharmonic Society
Baku	Heydar Aliyev Palace		1972	2,158	
Baku	Heydar Aliyev Center		2012		
Baku	Baku Convention Center		2015	6,000	
Baku	Azerbaijan State Theatre of Musical Comedy		1883	460	
Baku	Azerbaijan State Russian Drama Theatre		1920		
Baku	Azerbaijan State Academic National Drama Theatre		1919		
Baku	Azerbaijan State Theatre of Young Spectators		1928		
Ganja	Ganja State Drama Theater		1899		
Ganja	Ganja State Philharmonic Hall		2017	1,100	Goygol State Song and Dance Ensemble; Folk Instruments Orchestra; Ganja State Chamber Orchestra
Sumgait	Sumgayit State Musical Drama Theater		1968		
Shaki	Sheki Drama Theatre		1973	300	
Nakhchivan	Nakhchivan State Musical Dramatic Theatre		1883		

=== China ===
Province/ Municipality/ SAR	Location	Venue	Room	Date built	Seats	Resident organizations
Beijing	Beijing	Beijing Concert Hall	Music Hall	1960	1,024	China National Symphony Orchestra
Beijing	Beijing	National Centre for the Performing Arts	Music Hall	2007	2,017	China NCPA Concert Hall Orchestra
Chongqing	Chongqing	Chongqing Grand Theatre	Coliseum	2009	1,826	
Chongqing	Chongqing	Chongqing Grand Theatre	Theatre	2009	938	
Guangdong	Guangzhou	Guangzhou Opera House	Opera Hall	2010	1,804	
Guangdong	Guangzhou	Guangzhou Opera House	Experimental Theatre	2010	400	
Guangdong	Guangzhou	Xinghai Concert Hall	Symphony Hall	1998	1,518	Guangzhou Chinese Traditional Orchestra, Guangzhou Symphony Orchestra
Guangdong	Guangzhou	Xinghai Concert Hall	Chamber Music Hall	1998	461	Guangzhou Chinese Traditional Orchestra, Guangzhou Symphony Orchestra
Guangdong	Shenzhen	Shenzhen Concert Hall	Symphony Hall	2007	1,680	Shenzhen Symphony Orchestra
Shanghai	Shanghai	Shanghai Grand Theatre	Auditorium	1998	1,631	
Shanghai	Shanghai	Shanghai Grand Theatre	Buick Theater	1998	575	
Shanghai	Shanghai	Shanghai Grand Theatre	Small Theater	1998	300	
Shanghai	Shanghai	Shanghai Concert Hall	Music Hall	1930	1,122	
Shanghai	Shanghai	Oriental Art Center	Concert Hall	2005	1,953	
Shanghai	Shanghai	Oriental Art Center	Opera Hall	2005	1,015	
Shanghai	Shanghai	Oriental Art Center	Performance Hall	2005	333	
Shanghai	Shanghai	Shanghai Culture Square	Auditorium	2011	1,949	
Shanghai	Shanghai	Shanghai Symphony Hall	Main Hall	2014	1,200	Shanghai Symphony Orchestra
Shanghai	Shanghai	Shanghai Symphony Hall	Chamber Hall	2014	400	
Tianjin	Tianjin	Tianjin Grand Theatre	Opera House	2012	1,600	
Tianjin	Tianjin	Tianjin Grand Theatre	Concert Hall	2012	1,200	
Tianjin	Tianjin	Tianjin Grand Theatre	Experimental theatre	2012	400	
Tianjin	Tianjin	Tianjin Concert Hall	Concert hall	1922	650	
Wuxi	Wuxi	Wuxi Grand Theater	Opera Hall	2012	1,650	
Wuxi	Wuxi	Wuxi Grand Theater	Multifunctional hall	2012	700	
Shaanxi	Xi'an	Xi'an Concert Hall	Symphony Hall	2009	1,303	Xi'an Symphony Orchestra
Shaanxi	Xi'an	Shaanxi Opera House	Opera Hall	2017	1,902	Xi'an Symphony Orchestra
Heilongjiang	Harbin	Harbin Concert Hall	Symphony Hall	2014	1,600	Harbin Symphony Orchestra
Heilongjiang	Harbin	Harbin Grand Theatre	Opera Hall	2015	1,962	
Heilongjiang	Harbin	Harbin Old Synagogue Concert Hall	Concert Hall	2014		Harbin Symphony Orchestra

=== Georgia ===
Location	Venue	Room	Date built	Seats	Resident organizations
Tbilisi	Georgian National Opera Theater		1971	1,065	Georgian National Opera Theater
Tbilisi	Tbilisi Concert Hall		1912	2,317	

=== Hong Kong ===
Location	Venue	Room	Date built	Seats	Resident organizations
Hong Kong	Hong Kong Academy for Performing Arts	Lyric Theatre	1984	1,181	Academy Symphony Orchestra; Academy Chinese Orchestra; Other Academy Ensembles
Hong Kong	Hong Kong Academy for Performing Arts	Concert Hall	1984	382	
Hong Kong	Hong Kong Academy for Performing Arts	Amphitheatre	2010	600	
Hong Kong	Hong Kong Arts Centre	Shouson Theatre	1977	439	
Hong Kong	City Hall	Concert Hall	1962	1,434	Hong Kong Sinfonietta
Hong Kong	Sai Wan Ho Civic Centre	Theatre		471	The Absolutely Fabulous Theatre Connection
Hong Kong	Sheung Wan Civic Centre	Theatre		480	Perry Chiu Experimental Theatre
Hong Kong	University of Hong Kong	Loke Yew Hall	1912	595	
Hong Kong	University of Hong Kong	The Grand Hall	2013	934	
Kowloon	Hong Kong Baptist University	Academic Community Hall	1978	1,346	Hong Kong Baptist University Symphony Orchestra
Kowloon	Diocesan Boys' School	Yip Kit Chuen Concert Hall	2012	800	
Kowloon	City University of Hong Kong	Wei Hing Theatre	1984	374	Chinese Orchestra, City University of Hong Kong; City University Philharmonic Orchestra
Kowloon	Hong Kong Cultural Centre	Concert Hall	1989	2,019	Hong Kong Philharmonic Orchestra
Kowloon	Hong Kong Polytechnic University	Jockey Club Auditorium	2000	1,025–1,084	HKPU Students' Union Orchestra; HKPU Students' Union Chinese Orchestra
Kowloon	Ngau Chi Wan Civic Centre	Theatre	1987	354	Whole Theatre and E-Side Dance Company
New Territories	Chinese University of Hong Kong	Sir Run Run Shaw Hall	1981	1,438	
New Territories	Chinese University of Hong Kong	Lee Hysen Concert Hall	2002	269	Chung Chi Orchestra, Chung Chi Choir, Chunh Chi Wind Orchestra
New Territories	North District Town Hall	Auditorium		484	Hong Kong North Philharmonic Orchestra
New Territories	Sha Tin Town Hall	Auditorium	1987	1,372	The Cantonese Opera Advancement Association
New Territories	Tai Po Civic Centre	Auditorium	1985	756	
New Territories	Tuen Mun Town Hall	Auditorium	1987	1,372	Spring-Time Chinese Opera and Hon Fung Creative Chinese Opera
New Territories	Tsuen Wan Town Hall	Auditorium	1987	1,372	Hong Kong Dance Company
New Territories	Kwai Tsing Theatre	Auditorium	1999	905	Chung Ying Theatre Company and W Theatre and Wind Mill Grass Theatre
New Territories	Yuen Long Theater	Auditorium	2000	923	Chung Ying Theater Company

=== India ===
Location	Venue	Room	Date built	Seats	Resident organizations
Mumbai	National Centre for the Performing Arts	Jamshed Bhabha Theatre	1999	1,109	Symphony Orchestra of India
Mumbai	National Centre for the Performing Arts	Tata Theatre	1980	1,010	Symphony Orchestra of India
Mumbai	National Centre for the Performing Arts	BITS Pilani Goa Auditorium	2004	2,500	Symphony Orchestra of India
Mumbai	National Centre for the Performing Arts	Sri Shanmukhananda Chandrasekarendra Saraswathi Auditorium	1952	2,763	Symphony Orchestra of India
Mumbai	National Centre for the Performing Arts	Experimental Theatre	1986	285	Symphony Orchestra of India
Mumbai	National Centre for the Performing Arts	Godrej Dance Theatre	1985	185	Symphony Orchestra of India
Mumbai	National Centre for the Performing Arts	Little Theatre	1975	114	Symphony Orchestra of India

=== Iran ===
Location	Venue	Room	Date built	Seats	Resident organizations
Tehran	Milad Hall (IIEC)			2,100	
Tehran	Milad Tower Hall		2008	1,600	
Tehran	Vahdat Hall		1957	900	Tehran Symphony Orchestra Iran's National Orchestra
Tehran	Ministry of Interior Hall		1977	3,000	
Tabriz	Tabriz ark theater		1927	800	
Shiraz	Hafez Hall		1999	1,000	Fars Symphony Orchestra
Shiraz	Shar-e Raz Hall		2024	600	
Isfahan	Isfahan international convention center		2021	2,354	

=== Israel ===
Location	Venue	Room	Date built	Seats	Resident organizations
Jerusalem	International Convention Center	Ussishkin Auditorium	1956	3,104	
Tel Aviv	Charles Bronfman Auditorium		1957	2,760	Israel Philharmonic Orchestra
Tel Aviv	Tel Aviv Performing Arts Center		1994	1,656	The Israeli Opera

=== Indonesia ===
Location	Venue	Room	Date built	Seats	Resident organizations
Jakarta	Jakarta Art Building	Concert Hall	1821	475	Pemerintahan Daerah Provinsi Daerah Khusus Ibu Kota Jakarta
Jakarta	Aula Simfonia Jakarta	Auditorium and Concert Hall	2009	1,200	Jakarta Simfonia Orchestra & Jakarta Oratorio Society
Jakarta	The UBM Grand Auditorium	Auditorium and Concert Hall	2010	1,200	
Jakarta	Usmar Ismail Hall	Combined Cinema/Concert Hall	1997	430	
Jakarta	Balai Resital Kertanegara	Auditorium and Concert Hall	2014	270	Yayasan The Resonanz
Jakarta	Balai Sarbini	Auditorium and Concert Hall	1973	1,300	PT. Dome Semanggi Indonesia
Jakarta	Taman Ismail Marzuki	Exhibition and Art Hall	1968	1,240	

=== Japan ===
Prefecture	Location	Venue	Room	Date built	Seats	Resident organizations
Aichi	Nagoya	Aichi Prefectural Art Theater in Aichi Arts Center	Concert Hall	1993	1,800	Nagoya Philharmonic Orchestra
Aichi	Nagoya	Chukyo University Center for Culture & Arts	Aurora Hall	1972	2,291	
Chiba	Matsudo	Mori no Hall 21	Main Hall	1993	1,955	
Fukui	Fukui	Harmony Hall Fukui	Main Hall	1997	1,456	
Fukuoka	Kitakyushu	Kitakyushu Performing Arts Center	Main Hall	2003	1,269	
Fukuoka	Fukuoka	Acros Fukuoka Symphony Hall	Symphony Hall	1995	1,867	Kyushu Symphony
Gifu	Gifu	Gifu Civic Auditorium	Main Hall	1967	1,501	
Gifu	Gifu	Nagaragawa Convention Center	Main Hall	1995	1,689	
Hokkaido	Sapporo	Fukinoto Hall	Chamber Hall	2015	221	
Hokkaido	Sapporo	Sapporo Concert Hall Kitara	Main Hall	1997	2,008	Sapporo Symphony Orchestra
Hokkaido	Sapporo	Sapporo Education and Culture Hall	Main Hall	1977	1,100	
Hokkaido	Sapporo	Sapporo Cultural Arts Theater (hitaru)	Main Hall	2018	2,302	Sapporo Symphony Orchestra
Hokkaido	Sapporo	The Lutheran Hall	Chamber Hall	1986	216	
Hiroshima	Hiroshima	International Conference Center Hiroshima	Phoenix Hall	1955	2,003	
Hiroshima	Fukuyama	Fukuyama Hall of Art & Culture	Main Hall	1994	1,504	
Hiroshima	Higashihiroshima	Hiroshima Univ. Satake Memorial Hall	Main Hall	1999	1,000	
Hiroshima	Mihara	Mihara Performing Arts Center	Main Hall	2007	1,209	
Hyōgo	Amagasaki	Amagasaki Cultural Center	Archaic Hall	1975	2,030	
Hyōgo	Kobe	Kobe Culture Hall	Main Hall	1973	2,043	Kobe Philharmonic
Hyōgo	Kobe	Kobe International House	Kokusai Hall	1956	2,112	
Hyōgo	Nishinomiya	Hyogo Performing Arts Center	KOBELCO Grand Hall	2005	2,001	Hyogo Performing Arts Center Orchestra
Hyōgo	Himeji	Himeji Cultural Center	Main Hall	1972	1,657	
Ibaraki	Tsukuba	Nova Hall	Main Hall	1983	1,000	
Ishikawa	Kanazawa	Ishikawa Ongakudō	Concert Hall	2001	1,560	Orchestra Ensemble Kanazawa
Kagawa	Takamatsu	Sunport Hall Takamatsu	Main Hall	2004	1,500	
Kagawa	Takamatsu	Kagawa-kenmin Hall	Main Hall	1988	2,001	
Kanagawa	Kawasaki	Muza Kawasaki Symphony Hall	Symphony Hall	2004	1,997	Tokyo Symphony Orchestra
Kanagawa	Yokohama	Yokohama Minato Mirai Hall	Main Hall	1998	2,020	
Kanagawa	Yokohama	Kanagawa Kenritsu Ongakudo	Main Hall	1954	1,054	
Kanagawa	Yokosuka	Yokosuka Arts Theatre	Main Hall	1994	1,806	
Kumamoto	Kumamoto	Kumamoto Prefectural Theater	Main Hall	1983	1,813	
Kyoto	Kyoto	Kyoto International Conference Center	Main Hall	1966	1,840	
Kyoto	Kyoto	Kyoto Concert Hall	Main Hall	1995	1,839	Kyoto Symphony Orchestra
Kyoto	Kyoto	Rohm Theatre Kyoto	First Hall	1960	2,005	
Miyazaki	Miyazaki	Medikit Arts Center	Isaac Stern Hall	1993	1,818	
Nagano	Matsumoto	Matsumoto Performing Arts Centre	Main Hall	2004	1,800	
Niigata	Niigata	Ryutopia	Main Hall	1998	1,890	Tokyo Symphony Orchestra
Okayama	Okayama	Okayama Symphony Hall	Main Hall	1991	2,001	Okayama Philharmonic Orchestra
Okayama	Kurashiki	Kurashiki City Auditorium	Main Hall	1972	1,996	
Osaka	Osaka	Festival Hall, Osaka	Symphony Hall	1958	2,709	
Osaka	Osaka	The Symphony Hall	Symphony Hall	1982	1,704	Kansai Philharmonic Orchestra, Osaka Symphony Orchestra, Osaka Philharmonic Orchestra, Japan Century Symphony Orchestra
Osaka	Suita	May Theater	Main Hall	1985	1,397	
Osaka	Yao	Prism Hall	Main Hall	1988	1,440	
Saitama	Kawaguchi	Kawaguchi Lilia	Main Hall	1990	2,002	
Saitama	Saitama	Saitama Bunka Center	Main Hall	1985	2,006	
Saitama	Saitama	Omiya Sonic City	Main Hall	1988	2,505	
Saitama	Sōka	Soka-shi Bunka Kaikan	Main Hall	1972	1,198	
Saitama	Tokorozawa	Tokorozawa Muse	Ark Hall	1993	2,002	
Shiga	Ōtsu	Biwako Hall Center for The Performing Arts, Shiga	Main Hall	1998	1,848	
Shimane	Masuda	Grand Toit	Main Hall	2005	1,500	
Shizuoka	Fuji	Rosé Theatre	Main Hall	1993	1,632	
Shizuoka	Hamamatsu	Act City Hamamatsu	Main Hall	1994	2,336	
Tochigi	Ōtawara	Nasunogahara Harmony Hall	Main Hall	1994	1,275	
Tochigi	Utsunomiya	Tochigi Prefectural Cultural Center	Main Hall	1991	1,604	
Tokyo	Chiyoda	Kioi Hall	Kioi Hall	1995	800	Kioi Sinfonietta Tokyo
Tokyo	Chūō	Hamarikyu Asahi Hall	Main Hall	1992	552	
Tokyo	Fuchū	Fuchu-no-mori Art Theater	Dream Hall	1991	2,027	
Tokyo	Hachiōji	Hachioji City Art & Cultural Hall	Icho Hall	1994	802	
Tokyo	Hachiōji	J:COM Hall Hachioji	Main Hall	2011	2,021	
Tokyo	Hachiōji	Minami Osawa Cultural Hall	Main Hall	1996	500	
Tokyo	Katsushika	Katsushika Symphony Hills	Mozart Hall	1992	1,318	
Tokyo	Kita	Hokutopia	Sakura Hall	1990	1,300	
Tokyo	Minato	Suntory Hall	Main Hall	1986	2,006	
Tokyo	Setagaya	Hitomi Memorial Hall	Main Hall	1980	2,008	
Tokyo	Shibuya	Bunkamura	Orchard Hall	1986	2,006	Tokyo Philharmonic Orchestra
Tokyo	Shibuya	NHK Hall	Main Hall	1973	3,601	NHK Symphony Orchestra
Tokyo	Shinjuku	Tokyo Opera City	Concert Hall	1997	1,632	
Tokyo	Sumida	Sumida Triphony Hall	Main Hall	1997	1,801	New Japan Philharmonic
Tokyo	Taitō	Tokyo Bunka Kaikan	Main Hall	1961	2,303	Tokyo Metropolitan Symphony Orchestra
Tokyo	Toshima	Tokyo Metropolitan Theatre	Concert Hall	1990	1,999	
Tottori	Kurayoshi	Kurayoshi Mirai-chushin	Main Hall	2000	1,503	
Toyama	Uozu	Mirage Hall	Main Hall	1994	1,186	
Toyama	Toyama	Aubade Hall	Main Hall	1993	2,066	
Yamaguchi	Iwakuni	Symphonia Iwakuni	Main Hall	1996	1,205	
Yamaguchi	Ube	Watanabe Memorial Hall	Main Hall	1937	1,353	

=== Kazakhstan ===
Location	Venue	Room	Date built	Seats	Resident organizations
Almaty	Palace of the Republic	Concert Hall	1970	2,567	
Almaty	Auezov Theater	Auditorium	1981	756	
Nur-Sultan	Kazakhstan Central Concert Hall	Concert Hall	2010	3,500	

=== Lebanon ===
Location	Venue	Room	Date built	Seats	Resident organizations
Beirut	Conservatoire Libanais				Lebanese National Symphony Orchestra

=== Macau ===
Location	Venue	Room	Date built	Seats	Resident organizations
Sé	Macao Cultural Centre	Grand Auditorium	1999	1,076	Macao Orchestra

=== Malaysia ===
Location	Venue	Room	Date built	Seats	Resident organizations
Kuala Lumpur	Petronas Philharmonic Hall	Concert Hall	1998	920	Malaysian Philharmonic Orchestra, Malaysian Philharmonic Youth Orchestra
Kuala Lumpur	Istana Budaya	Panggung Sari Hall	1999	1,412	National Symphony Orchestra; National Youth Symphony Orchestra
Kuala Lumpur	Kuala Lumpur Performing Arts Centre	Stage 1	2006	504	KLPac Orchestra
Kuala Lumpur	Kuala Lumpur Performing Arts Centre	Stage 2	2006	190	KLPac Orchestra
Kuala Lumpur	Kuala Lumpur Convention Centre	Plenary Hall	2005	2,994	
Kuala Lumpur	Angkasapuri	Auditorium Perdana	1969	700	RTM Orchestra
Kuala Lumpur	Panggung Bandaraya DBKL	Theatre Hall	1896	350	DBKL Orchestra
Kuala Lumpur	University of Malaya	Great Hall (Dewan Tunku Canselor)	1966	3,000	University of Malaya Symphony Orchestra
Kuala Lumpur	University of Malaya	Experimental Theatre (Panggung Eksperimen)	1966	435	University of Malaya Symphony Orchestra
Selangor	Damansara Performing Arts Centre	Theatre Hall	2013	200	
Selangor	Damansara Performing Arts Centre	Black Box	2013	120	
Selangor	Shah Alam Royale Theatre	Theatre Hall	2008	800	
Penang	Penang Performing Arts Centre	Stage 1	2011	303	
Penang	Penang Performing Arts Centre	Stage 2	2011	120	
Penang	Dewan Sri Pinang	Auditorium	1972	1,300	Penang Philharmonic Orchestra
Pahang	Arena of Stars		1998	6,000	
Johor	Permaisuri Zarith Sofiah Opera House		2019	600	
Sarawak	Borneo Convention Centre Kuching		2009	2,000	

=== North Korea ===
Location	Venue	Room	Date built	Seats	Resident organizations
Pyongyang	East Pyongyang Grand Theatre	Theatre Hall	1989	2,500	
Pyongyang	Pyongyang International House of Culture	Music Hall	1988	600	Isang Yun Orchestra

=== Oman ===
Location	Venue	Room	Date built	Seats	Resident organizations
Muscat	Royal Opera House Muscat		2011	1,100	Royal Oman Symphony Orchestra

=== Philippines ===
Location	Venue	Room	Date built	Seats	Resident organizations
Los Baños, Laguna	University of the Philippines Los Baños	D.L Umali Hall	1965	700	
Makati	Colegio San Agustin – Makati	Saint Ambrose Hall	1980	1,100	
Makati	Greenbelt (Ayala Center)	Onstage Theater, Greenbelt 1	2002	800	
Makati	RCBC Plaza	Carlos Romulo Auditorium	2001	450	
Manila	Teatro Nacional		1860	unknown	
Manila	Metropolitan Theater		1931	1,670	
Manila	Philam Life Theater		1961	737	
Manila	De La Salle University	Teresa Yuchengco Auditorium	2002	1,100	
Marikina	Teatro Marikina		2002	1,100	
Taguig	SM Aura Premier	Samsung Hall	2013	1,000	
Muntinlupa	Insular Life Corporate Centre	Insular Life Auditorium	2001	524	
Parañaque	PAGCOR Airport Casino Filipino	PAGCOR Grand Theater	1998	2,000	
Parañaque	Solaire Resort and Casino	The Theatre		1,740	
Pasay	Cultural Center of the Philippines Complex	Tanghalang Nicanor Abelardo (Main Theater); Nicanor Abelardo Theater	1969	1,821	
Pasay	Cultural Center of the Philippines Complex	Tanghalang Aurelio Tolentino (Little Theater); Aurelio Tolentino Theater	1969	421	
Pasay	Cultural Center of the Philippines Complex	Tanghalang Huseng Batute (Studio Theater); Huseng Batute Theater	1969	250	
Pasay	Cultural Center of the Philippines Complex	Aliw Theater	2002	2,724	
Pasay	Resorts World Manila	Newport Performing Arts Theater	2010	1,800	
Pasig	Tanghalang Pasigueño	Asamblea Magna (Main Theater)		1,300	
Pasig	Tanghalang Pasigueño	Nagsabado Hall (Mini Theater)		60	
Pasig	Tanghalang Pasigueño	Dalampasigan Hall (Mini Theater)		60	
Pasig	Meralco Theater		1969	1,000	
Quezon City	Amoranto Theater		2006	800	
Quezon City	Ateneo de Manila University	Henry Lee Erwin Theater	1994	1,131	
Quezon City	Camp Aguinaldo	AFP Museum and Multi-Purpose Theater		1,074	
Quezon City	PETA Theater Center	PETA-PHINMA Theater	2005	450	
Quezon City	University of the Philippines Diliman	University Theater (Villamor Hall)	1960	2,400	
San Juan	Greenhills Shopping Center	Music Museum	1988	900	

=== Singapore ===
Venue	Room	Date built	Seats	Resident organizations
The Arts House at the Old Parliament	The Chamber	2004 (Refurbished)	200	
Esplanade – Theatres on the Bay	Esplanade Concert Hall	2002	1,825	
Esplanade – Theatres on the Bay	Esplanade Theatre	2002	1,950	
Marina Bay Sands	The Sands Theatre	2010	2,183	
National University of Singapore	Yong Siew Toh Conservatory (YST) Conservatory Concert Hall	2006	573	The Conservatory Orchestra
National University of Singapore	University Cultural Centre Concert Hall	2000	1,710	
Nanyang Academy of Fine Arts	Lee Foundation Theatre	2004	380	NAFA Orchestra
Resorts World Sentosa	Festive Grand Theatre	2010	1,600	
School of The Arts	Concert Hall	2011	708	
School of The Arts	Drama Theatre	2011	423	
Singapore Conference Hall	Singapore Conference Hall	1965	831	Singapore Chinese Orchestra
The Star, Singapore	The Star Theatre	2012	5,000	New Creation Church
Victoria Theatre and Concert Hall	Victoria Concert Hall	1905	673	Singapore Symphony Orchestra
Victoria Theatre and Concert Hall	Victoria Theatre	1905	614	

=== South Korea ===
Location	Venue	Room	Date built	Seats	Resident organizations
Anyang	Anyang Arts Center	Gwan-Ak Hall	1989	1,127	Anyang Philharmonic Orchestra
Bucheon	Bucheon Arts Center	Concert Hall	2023	1,445	
Busan	Busan Citizen's Hall	Main Hall	1970	1,606	
Busan	Busan Cultural Center	Grand Theater	1989	1,403	
Busan	The National Center for Korean Traditional Performing Arts in Busan	Yeon Ak Dang (Grand Theater)	2008	698	
Busan	The National Center for Korean Traditional Performing Arts in Busan	Ye Ji Dang (Little Theater)	2008	276	
Busan	Busan Concert hall	Main hall	2025	2011	
Busan	Busan KBS	Main Hall	1985	2,847	Family Musical "Frozen"
Busan	Kyung Sung University Concert Hall	Concert Hall	1955	449	
Busan	Sohyang Theatre Lotte Card Hall	Main Hall		1,134	Various music concerts and musicals
Changwon	3.15 Art Center	Grand Theater	2008	1,182	
Changwon	Sungsan Arts Hall	Grand Theatre	2000	1,720	Changwon Philharmonic Orchestra
Cheonan	Chungcheongnamdo Students Educational&Cultural Center	Grand Hall	1997	1,510	
Daegu	Daegu Cultural and Arts Center	Palgong Hall	1991	1,013	Daegu Municipal Symphony Orchestra, Philharmonic Choir, Dance Company, Theater, and Youth Choir
Daegu	Daegu Opera House	Main Hall	2003	1,490	Daegu Municipal Opera Company
Daegu	Keimyung Art Center	Main hall	2008	1,728	The Phantom of Opera
Daejeon	Daejeon Culture & Art Center	Art Hall	2003	1,546	Daejeon Municipal Philharmonic Choir, Daejeon Municipal Youth Philharmonic Choir, Daejeon Municipal Symphony Orchestra, Daejeon Municipal Dance Company
Daejeon	Daejeon Culture & Art Center	Amphitheater	2003	1,000	
Daejeon	Hannam University Sungji Gwan (Hall)	Sungji hall	1986	1,549	
Daejeon	Woosong Art Center	Main Hall	1992	1,214	
Daejeon	Jeongsimhwa International Cultural Center	Jeongsimhwa Hall	2000	1,817	
Gimhae	Gimhae Arts and Sports Center	Maru Hall	2005	1,464	
Goyang	Goyang Eoulim Nuri	Main Auditorium	2004	1218	
Gunpo	Gumpo Culture & Art Center	Mainhall	1998	1,129	Prime Philharmonic Orchestra, Sejong National Traditional Orchestra
Gwangju	Gwangju Culture & Art Center	Main theater	1993	1,732	
Gwangju	U Square Culture Center	Kumho Art Hall	2009	316	
Gwangju	U Square Culture Center	Dongsan Art Hall	2009	234	
Gyeongsan	Chunma Arts Center	Grand Hall	2008	1,889	
Gyeongsan	Chunma Arts Center	Chamber Hall	2008	510	
Hanam	Hanam Arts Center	Gumdam Hall	2006	911	
Incheon	Incheon Culture & Arts Center	Main Hall	1994	1,332	Incheon Municipal Symphony Orchestra, Incheon Municipal Philharmonic Choir, Incheon Municipal Dance Company, Incheon Municipal Theater
Incheon	Bupyeong Arts Center	Haenuri	2010	893	Shipnyeonwho Dance Company, Gubo Dance Company
Jinju	Gyeongsangnamdo Culture & Arts Center	Main Hall	1988	1,564	Jinju Municipal Symphonic Orchestra, Jinju Municipal Philharmonic Choir, Jinju Municipal Traditional orchestra, Jinju Municipal Boys&Girls Choir
Jeonju	Sori Arts Center of Jeollabuk-do	Moak Hall	2001	2,037	
Pohang	Pohang Arts Center	Main Hall	1995	982	Pohang Municipal Symphony Orchestra, Pohang Municipal Philharmonic Choir, Pohang Municipal Theater
Seongnam	Seongnam Arts Center	Opera House	2005	1,804	Seongnam Municipal Korean Traditional Orchestra, Seongnam Municipal Symphony Orchestra, Seongnam Municipal Philharmonic Choir
Seongnam	Seongnam Arts Center	Concert Hall	2005	996	
Seoul	Arco Arts Theater	Grand Hall	1981	608	
Seoul	Changdeok Palace	Changdeokgung Little Theater	1395	150	
Seoul	Daehakro Art Theater	Grand Theater	2005	504	
Seoul	Doosan Art Center	Yongang Hall	1993	620	
Seoul	Chung Mu Art Hall	Grand Theater	2005	1,231	
Seoul	Gwangjin Naru Art Center	Grand Hall	2005	689	
Seoul	Lotte Concert Hall	Main Auditorium	2016	2,036	
Seoul	Sejong Center for the Performing Arts	The Main Auditorium	1978	3,048	
Seoul	Seoul Arts Center	Concert Hall	1988	2,523	Korean Symphony Orchestra
Seoul	National Theater of Korea	Haeorum Theater (sunrising)	1950	1,563	National Drama Company of Korea, National Changguk Company of Korea, National Dance Company of Korea, National Orchestra of Korea
Seoul	National Theater of Korea	Dalorum Theater (moonrising)	1950	427	
Seoul	The K Art Hall	Grand Theater	1991	1,000	
Seoul	Sogang University Mary Hall	Mary Hall	1970	455	
Seoul	Hanjeon (KEPCO) Art Center	Grand Theater	2001	1,015	Musical Spamalot
Seoul	Konkuk University Saecheonnyeon Gwan	Saecheonnyeon Gwan	2000	805	
Seoul	National Museum of Korea	Theatre "Yong"	2005	862	
Seoul	KBS Hall	KBS Hall	1991	1,700	KBS Symphony Orchestra, KBS Traditional Music Orchestra
Seoul	LG Arts Center		2000	1,103	
Seoul	Mapo Art Center		2002	782	
Seoul	Kumho Art Hall	Kumho Art Hall	2000	390	
Seoul	Kumho Art Hall	Munho Art Hall	2006	210	
Seoul	Universal Art Center	Grand Theater	1981	1,082	Universal Ballet Company, Little Angels Art Company
Suncheon	Suncheon Culture&Art Center	Mainhall	1993	950	Suncheon Municipal Philharmonic Choir, Symphony Orchestra
Tongyeong	Tongyeong Arts Center	Main hall	1997	880	Tongyeong International Music Festival
Ulsan	Hyundai Arts Center	Arts Center	1998	962	
Ulsan	Ulsan Culture&Art Center	Grand Hall	1995	1,570	Ulsan Municipal Philharmonic Choir, Symphony Orchestra, Dance Company, Youth Symphony Orchestra&Choir

=== Syria ===
Location	Venue	Room	Date built	Seats	Resident organizations
Damascus	Damascus Opera House		2004	1,331	

=== Taiwan ===
Location	Venue	Room	Date built	Seats	Resident organizations
Changhua	Yuanlin Performance Hall	Performance Hall		1,080	
Changhua	Yuanlin Performance Hall	Theater		300	
Chiayi	Chiayi Cultural Center	Concert Hall	1997	1,030	Chiayi Wind Orchestra
Chiayi	Chiayi Cultural Center	Zhongzhen Park Music Stage		600	
Chiayi	Performing Arts Center	Performance Hall		972	
Hsinchu	Hsinchu City Cultural Center	Concert Hall		1,500	Hsinchu Philharmonic Orchestra, Hsinchu Chinese Orchestra, Hsinchu Youth Chinese Orchestra
Hsinchu	Hsinchu City Cultural Center	International Conference Center			
Hsinchu	Hsinchu County Cultural Center	Performance Hall			Hsinchu County Chinese Orchestra
Hsinchu	National Chiao Tung University	Recital Hall		300	NCTU Chamber
Hsinchu	National Hsinchu Senior High School Building for Music	Concert Hall		500	HCHS Orchestra
Hualien	Hualien Cultural Center	Performance Hall		799	
Hualien	Hakka Folk Art Center	Performance Hall		425	
Ilan	National Center for Traditional Arts	Theater	1995	414	
Ilan	National Center for Traditional Arts	Center for Music Art	1995		
Ilan	Yilan Cultural Center	Performance Hall	1990	496	Lanyang Concert Orchestra
Ilan	Yilan Cultural Center	JiaoHsi Theater	1990	300	
Ilan	Yilan Senior High School	Performance Hall			
Kaohsiung	National Kaohsiung Center for the Arts (Wei-Wu-Ying)	Opera House	2018	2,260	
Kaohsiung	National Kaohsiung Center for the Arts (Wei-Wu-Ying)	Concert Hall	2018	2,000	
Kaohsiung	National Kaohsiung Center for the Arts (Wei-Wu-Ying)	Playhouse	2018	1,254	
Kaohsiung	National Kaohsiung Center for the Arts (Wei-Wu-Ying)	Recital Hall	2018	470	
Kaohsiung	Kaohsiung City Cultural Center	Jhihde Hall	1981	1,702	
Kaohsiung	Dadong Arts Center	Performance Hall	2012	880	Kaohsiung City Symphony Orchestra, Kaohsiung City Chinese Orchestra
Kaohsiung	Gangshan Cultural Center	Performance Hall	1993	766	
Kaohsiung	Kaohsiung Music Hall		2000	344	
Kaohsiung	Kaohsiung Popular Music Center	Concert Hall	2019	6,800	
Kinmen	Kinmen Performance Hall	Performance Hall		885	
Miaoli	Zhongzhen Hall			780	
Nantou	Nantou Cultural Center	Performance Hall	1982	842	
Penghu	Penghu Concert Hall				Penghu Chorus, Penghu Youth Traditional Ensemble
Taichung	National Taichung Theater	Main Hall	2016	2,011	
Taichung	Taiwan Symphony Hall (Woofung Concert Hall)	Main Hall			National Taiwan Symphony Orchestra
Taichung	Taichung Seaport Area Art Center	Performance Hall		546	
Taichung	Zhongshan Hall				National Taiwan Symphony Orchestra
Tainan	Tainan City Cultural Center	Performance Hall		2,010	Tainan Symphony Orchestra, Tainan Traditional Orchestra
Tainan	Xinying Cultural Center	Performance Hall	1986	846	
Taipei	National Performing Arts Center	National Concert Hall	1988	2,074	Taiwan National Symphony; Taipei Philharmonic Orchestra; National Chinese Orchestra; National Experimental Chorus
Taipei	National Performing Arts Center	National Theater	1988		
Taipei	National Performing Arts Center	Recital Hall	1988		
Taipei	National Performing Arts Center	Experimental Theater	1988		
Taipei	Taiwan Traditional Theatre Center	Main Theatre	2016	1,036	National Chinese Orchestra Taiwan; GuoGuang Opera Company
Taipei	Taipei Performing Arts Center	Blue Box	2022	500	
Taipei	Taipei Performing Arts Center	Globe Playhouse	2022	800	
Taipei	Taipei Performing Arts Center	Grand Theater	2022	1,500	
Taipei	Zhongshan Hall	Zhongzheng Hall	1928	1,122	Taipei Symphony Orchestra, Taipei Chinese Orchestra
Taipei	Zhongshan Hall	Guangfu Hall	1928		
Taipei	Novel Hall	Main Hall	1997	935	Novel Dance Series, Novel Drama Series
Taipei	Taipei Cultural Center	The Metropolitan Hall	1983	1,002	
Taipei	New Taipei City Arts Center	Performance Hall	1983	737	
Taipei	National Taiwan Normal University College of Music	Concert Hall			NTNU Symphony Orchestra, NTNU Music Department Chorus
Taipei	Taipei National University of the Arts Performing Arts Center	Concert Hall		512	Taipei University of the Arts Orchestra
Taipei	Taipei National University of the Arts Performing Arts Center	Dance Theater		344	
Taipei	Taipei National University of the Arts Performing Arts Center	Experimental Theater		270	
Taipei	Christian Church of the Assembly of God	Bach Hall			
Taoyuan	Taoyuan Cultural Center	Performance Hall			
Taoyuan	Zhongli Art Hall	Concert Hall			
Yunlin	Yunlin Concert Hall		1987	938	

=== Thailand ===
Location	Venue	Room	Date built	Seats	Resident organizations
Bangkok	Chulalongkorn Conference Hall	Main Hall	1967		CU Band
Bangkok	Kasetsart Conference Hall	Main Hall	1966		KU Band
Bangkok	Muangthai Rachadalai Theatre	Theatre	2006	1,450	Regular Musical Theatre
Bangkok	National Theatre	Main Hall	1965	1,300	Royal Thai Classical Music and Dance
Bangkok	Sala Chalermkrung Royal Theatre	Main Hall	1933	2,000	Royal Khon Dance
Bangkok	Siam Pavali Theatre	Theatre	2005	1,200	
Bangkok	Thailand Cultural Centre	Main Hall	1987	2,000	Royal Bangkok Symphony Orchestra, Bangkok Opera, Siam Philharmonic Orchestra, Orpheus Choir of Bangkok
Bangkok	Thammasat University Auditorium	Main Hall	1954	2,500	Thammasat University Symphony Orchestra
Nakhon Pathom	Prince Mahidol Hall	Main Hall	2014	2,006	Thailand Philharmonic Orchestra
Chiang Mai	Kad Suan Kaew Theatre	Theatre	1994	1,480	Chiang Mai Youth Philharmonic Band

=== Turkey ===
Location	Venue	Room	Date built	Seats	Resident organizations
Ankara	Ankara Opera House		1948	700	Turkish State Opera and Ballet
Ankara	ATO Congresium	Gordion Oditoryum	2012	3,107	
Ankara	Bilkent Concert Hall	Bilkent Concert Hall	1994	800	Bilkent Symphony Orchestra
Ankara	Bilkent Odeon		1999	4,000	Bilkent Symphony Orchestra
Ankara	CSO Ada Ankara	CSO Main Hall	2020	2,023	Presidential Symphony Orchestra
Ankara	CSO Ada Ankara	CSO Blue Hall	2020	500	Presidential Symphony Orchestra
Ankara	CSO Ada Ankara	CSO Historical Hall	1962	650	Presidential Symphony Orchestra
Istanbul	Atatürk Cultural Center	Türk Telekom Opera Hall	1978 (rebuilt in 2021)	2,040	Istanbul State Symphony Orchestra, Istanbul State Opera and Ballet
Istanbul	Caddebostan Cultural Center		2005	775	
Istanbul	Cemal Reşit Rey Concert Hall		1989	862	Cemal Reşit Rey Symphony Orchestra
Istanbul	Is Sanat Istanbul Hall	Is Sanat	2000	802	
Istanbul	Istanbul Lütfi Kırdar Convention and Exhibition Center			2,000	
Istanbul	Zorlu Center PSM		2013	2,262	
Istanbul	MKM-MUSTAFA KEMAL CULTURAL CENTER – Akatlar-Beşiktaş	Attila İlhan Hall	2004	1,032	
Istanbul	Kadıköy Süreyya Opera Hall		2007	562	Istanbul State Opera and Ballet
İzmir	Ahmet Adnan Saygun Sanat Merkezi, Concert Hall		2009	1,153	Izmir State Philarmonic Orchestra

=== Vietnam ===
Location	Venue	Room	Date built	Seats	Resident organizations
Hanoi	Hanoi Opera House	Main Hall	1911	598 (870 seats originally)	Vietnam National Symphony Orchestra, Hanoi Philharmonic Orchestra
Ho Chi Minh City	Municipal Theatre, Ho Chi Minh City	Main Hall	1897	500	The Ho Chi Minh City Ballet Symphony Orchestra and Opera's (HBSO)
Ho Chi Minh City	Hoa Binh Theater	Main Hall	1985	2,500 (Maximum Capacity)	
Haiphong	Haiphong Opera House	Main Hall	1912	400	

== Europe ==
=== Albania ===
Location	Venue	Room	Date built	Seats	Resident organizations
Tirana	Palace of Culture of Tirana	National Theatre of Opera and Ballet of Albania	1953	200	Albanian National Song and Dance Ensemble

=== Austria ===
Location	Venue	Room	Date built	Seats + standing room	Resident organizations
Bregenz	Festspielhaus	Großer Saal	1979	1,656	Symphony Orchestra Vorarlberg, Bregenzer Festspiele, Vienna Symphony (since 1946 the 'orchestra in residence' of the Bregenz Festival)
Eisenstadt	Schloss Esterházy	Haydnsaal	1672	665	Haydn Orchestra, Haydn Festival
Erl	Festspielhaus Erl		1959	1,508	Tiroler Festspiele Erl, Passionsspiele Erl
Erl	Neues Festspielhaus Erl		2012	862	Tiroler Festspiele Erl, Passionsspiele Erl
Grafenegg	Schloss Grafenegg	Auditorium	2008	1,372	Tonkünstler Orchestra, Grafenegg Festival
Graz	Grazer Congress	Stefaniensaal (Stephaniensaal)	1885	1,050	Musikverein für Steiermark, styriarte
Graz	Graz Opera	Zuschauerraum	1899	1,186 + 200	Graz Philharmonic Orchestra, Chor der Oper Graz, Tanzkompanie
Graz	Helmut-List-Halle		2002	2,000	Steirischer Herbst, styriarte
Graz	University of Music and Performing Arts, Graz	MUMUTH	2008	450	Steirischer Herbst, styriarte
Graz	Kulturzentrum Minoriten	Minoritensaal	1732	500	styriarte
Graz	Schloss Eggenberg	Planetensaal	1685	389	styriarte
Innsbruck	Congress Innsbruck	Dogana	1973	1,130	Meisterkonzerte Innsbruck
Innsbruck	Congress Innsbruck	Saal Tirol	1973	1,500	Meisterkonzerte Innsbruck
Innsbruck	Hofburg Innsbruck	Riesensaal	1765	400	Innsbruck Festival of Early Music
Innsbruck	Landestheater (1846)	Großes Haus	1967	800	Tiroler Symphonieorchester
Innsbruck	Ambras Castle	Spanischer Saal	1572	380	Ambras Castle Concerts, Innsbruck Festival of Early Music
Klagenfurt	Konzerthaus (1900)	Großer Saal	1952	647	Landeskonservatorium
Klagenfurt	Stadttheater Klagenfurt	Zuschauerraum	1910	793 + 40 + 2 Wheelchairs	Kärntner Sinfonieorchester
Linz	Brucknerhaus	Großer Saal	1974	1,420	Bruckner Orchestra, Brucknerfest, Ars electronica
Linz	Musiktheater	Auditorium	2013	970 + 160	Bruckner Orchestra
Ossiach	CMA Stift Ossiach	Alban Berg Concert Hall	2009	480	The Carinthian Summer Music Festival
Raiding	Liszt Centre	Liszt Concert Hall	2006	570	Liszt Festival Raiding
Salzburg	Großes Festspielhaus		1960	2,179	Salzburg Festival, Pfingstfestspiele, Osterfestspiele, Vienna Philharmonic, Berlin Philharmonic
Salzburg	Kleines Festspielhaus (1925)	Haus für Mozart	2006	1,495	Salzburg Festival, Mozartwoche
Salzburg	Landestheater	Großes Haus	1893	697	Salzburg Festival, Mozarteum Orchestra
Salzburg	Mozarteum concert hall	Großer Saal	1914	807	Salzburg Festival, Mozartwoche
Sankt Pölten	Festspielhaus	Großer Saal	1997	1,079 + 70 + 4 Wheelchairs	Tonkünstler Orchestra
Schwarzenberg	Angelika-Kauffmann-Saal		2001	590	Schubertiade
Vienna	Konzerthaus	Großer Saal	1913	1,840	Vienna Symphony, Vienna Chamber Orchestra, Klangforum Wien, Wiener Singakademie, Vienna Radio Symphony Orchestra
Vienna	Konzerthaus	Mozartsaal	1913	704	Wiener Konzerthausgesellschaft
Vienna	Musikverein	Großer Musikvereinssaal	1870	1,744 + 300	Gesellschaft der Musikfreunde, Vienna Philharmonic, Vienna Symphony, Tonkünstler Orchestra, Vienna Radio Symphony Orchestra
Vienna	Musikverein	Brahmssaal	1870	600	Gesellschaft der Musikfreunde
Vienna	Raimund Theater	Zuschauerraum	1893	1,180 + 40	VBW Orchestra
Vienna	Ronacher (1888)	Zuschauerraum	2008	1,054 + 40	VBW Orchestra
Vienna	Staatsoper (1869)	Zuschauerraum	1955	1,713 + 567 + 22 Wheelchairs	Staatsopern Orchester, Staatsopern Chor, Staatsballett Wien
Vienna	Theater an der Wien	Zuschauerraum	1801	1,129 + 50	Vienna Radio Symphony Orchestra, Vienna Symphony, Concentus Musicus, Arnold Schoenberg Choir
Vienna	Volksoper	Zuschauerraum	1898	1,337	Volksopern Orchester, Volksopern Chor, Staatsballett Wien
Villach	Congress Center (1971)	Josef-Resch-Saal	1999	1,060	Carinthian Summer Music Festival
Villach	Congress Center (1971)	Gottfried-von-Einem-Saal	1999	530	Carinthian Summer Music Festival
Waidhofen an der Ybbs	Rothschildschloss Waidhofen (1890)	Kristallsaal	2007	299	Klangraum Waidhofen Music Festival

=== Belgium ===
Location	Venue	Room	Date built	Seats	Resident organizations
Antwerp	DeSingel	Blauwe zaal	1980	950	
Antwerp	Koningin Elisabethzaal / Queen Elisabeth Hall		1897	2,000	Antwerp Symphony Orchestra
Antwerp	Opera Antwerpen		1907	1,000	Opera Ballet Vlaanderen, Symfonisch Orkest Opera Ballet Vlaanderen
Bruges	Concertgebouw Brugge		2002	1,300	Anima Eterna Brugge
Brussels	Ancienne Belgique		1857	2,000	
Brussels	Conservatoire Royal de Musique / Koninklijk Muziekconservatorium	Grande Salle / Grote Zaal	1872-1876	597	
Brussels	De Vaartkapoen		1984	480	
Brussels	Flagey	Studio 4	1938	862	Brussels Philharmonic
Brussels	Palais des Beaux Arts/Paleis voor Schone Kunsten	Salle Henri Le Boeuf / Henri Le Boeufzaal	1929	2,150	National Orchestra of Belgium
Brussels	Théâtre Royal de la Monnaie / Koninklijke Muntschouwburg		1700-1856	1,200	Orchestre Symphonique de la Monnaie / Symfonieorkest van de Munt
Ghent	Muziekcentrum De Bijloke	Concertzaal	1251-2020	960	Symfonieorkest Vlaanderen
Ghent	Opera Gent	Grote zaal, Redoutezaal, Lullyzaal	1840	900	Opera Ballet Vlaanderen, Symfonisch Orkest Opera Ballet Vlaanderen
Ghent	Vooruit	Concertzaal, Theaterzaal, Balzaal, Domzaal	1913	1,200	
Liège	Salle Philharmonique de Liège		1887	1,162	Orchestre Philharmonique de Liège
Liège	La Zone		1991	220	

=== Bulgaria ===
Location	Venue	Room	Date built	Seats	Resident organizations
Sofia	Bulgaria Hall	Grand Hall	1937	1,200	Sofia Philharmonic Orchestra
Sofia	Bulgaria Hall	Chamber Hall	1937		Sofia Philharmonic Orchestra
Sofia	National Palace of Culture	Hall 1 NPC	1981	3,380	

=== Croatia ===
Town	Venue	Room	Date built	Seats	Resident organizations
Opatija	Cultural Center Gervais	Great Hall	2017	500 (+300)	
Opatija	Cultural Center Gervais	Small Hall	2017		
Osijek	Cultural Center Osijek	Franjo Krežma Concert Hall	2024	425	
Požega	Požega Music School	Green Hall	2014		
Požega	Požega Music School	Blue Hall	2014		
Požega	Požega Music School	Main Hall	2014	277	
Slavonski Brod	Theatre and Concert Hall Ivana Brlić – Mažuranić	Great Hall	1972	585	Brod Accordion Orchestra "Bela pl. Panthy" Brod Tambura Orchestra
Slavonski Brod	Theatre and Concert Hall Ivana Brlić – Mažuranić	Small Hall	1972	140	Brod Accordion Orchestra "Bela pl. Panthy" Brod Tambura Orchestra
Split	Croatian House	Ivo Tijardović Concert Hall	1908	250	
Split	Croatian House	Small Hall	1908	50–70	
Varaždin	Croatian National Theatre in Varaždin	Great Concert Hall	1873		Varaždin Chamber Orchestra
Zagreb	Vatroslav Lisinski Concert Hall	Great Hall	1973	1,847	Zagreb Philharmonic Orchestra, Croatian Radiotelevision Symphony Orchestra
Zagreb	Vatroslav Lisinski Concert Hall	Small Hall	1973	304	
Zagreb	Tvornica Kulture			2,200	
Zagreb	Academy of Music, University of Zagreb	Blagoje Bersa Concert Hall	2016	300	
Zagreb	Croatian Music Institute	Great Hall	1876	386	
Zagreb	Croatian Music Institute	Small Hall	1895	200	
Zagreb	Croatian Music Institute	Basement Hall	1993	70	

=== Czech Republic ===
Location	Venue	Room	Date built	Seats	Resident organizations
Brno	Besední dům		1873	433	Brno Philharmonic
Olomouc	Moravian Theatre	Reduta	1830	500	Moravian Philharmonic
Ostrava	Dům kultury města Ostravy		1961	1,000	Janáček Philharmonic Orchestra
Prague	Rudolfinum	Dvořák Hall	1881	1,100	Czech Philharmonic, Prague Philharmonia, City of Prague Philharmonic Orchestra
Prague	Municipal House	Smetana Hall	1912	1,067	Prague Symphony Orchestra, Czech National Symphony Orchestra
Prague	State Opera Prague		1888	1,058	
Prague	Prague Castle	Španělský sál	1606	770	
Prague	Prague Castle	Míčovna	1569	300	
Zlín	Congress Centre	Velký sál	2010	881	Bohuslav Martinů Philharmonic Orchestra

=== Denmark ===
Location	Venue	Room	Date built	Seats	Resident organizations
Aalborg	Musikkens Hus	Main Hall	2014	1,298	Aalborg Symphony Orchestra
Aarhus	Concert Hall of Aarhus	Main Hall	1982	1,588	Aarhus Symphony Orchestra
Copenhagen	Copenhagen Concert Hall	Main Auditorium	2009	1,800	Danish National Symphony Orchestra
Copenhagen	Royal Danish Theatre	Old Stage	1874	1,600	Royal Danish Orchestra
Copenhagen	Tivoli Concert Hall	Main Hall	1956	1,692	Tivoli Symphony Orchestra
Copenhagen	Royal Danish Academy of Music Concert Hall	Main Hall	1945	1,074	Copenhagen Philharmonic Orchestra
Copenhagen	Odd Fellows Mansion	The Concert Hall	1755	210	
Copenhagen	Black Diamond	Queen's Hall	1999	600	Diamond Ensemble
Copenhagen	Ny Carlsberg Glyptotek	The Auditorium	1906	300	
Copenhagen	Mogens Dahl Concert Hall	Concert Hall	2005	225	Mogens Dahl Chamber Choir
Esbjerg	Esbjerg Concert Hall	Main Hall	1997	1,121	West Jutland Symphony Orchestra
Humlebæk	Louisiana Museum of Modern Art	The Louisiana Concert Hall	1976	265	
Odense	Odense Concert Hall	Carl Nielsen Hall	1982	1,320	Odense Symphony Orchestra
Odense	Odeon	Odeon Big Concert Hall	2017	1740	Odense Symphony Orchestra
Odense	Odense Concert Hall	Pro Musica Hall	1982	383	Odense Symphony Orchestra
Sønderborg	Alsion Concert Hall	Main Hall	2007	900	South Jutland Symphony Orchestra

=== Estonia ===
Location	Venue	Room	Date built	Seats	Resident organizations
Jõhvi	Jõhvi Concert Hall	Suur saal (Large Hall)	2005	826	
Pärnu	Pärnu Concert Hall	Suur saal (Large Hall)	2002	856	
Tallinn	Estonia Theatre	Estonia Concert Hall	1913	889	Estonian National Symphony Orchestra
Tallinn	Alexela Concert Hall	Suur saal (Large Hall)	2009	1,830	
Tartu	Vanemuise Concert Hall		1970	881	

=== Finland ===
Location	Venue	Room	Date built	Seats	Resident organizations
Espoo	Espoo Cultural Centre	Tapiola Hall	1989	733	Tapiola Sinfonietta
Espoo	Sello Hall		2003	400	
Hämeenlinna	Verkatehdas	Vanaja hall	2011	703	
Helsinki	Finlandia Hall	Concert hall	1971	1,700	
Helsinki	Helsinki Conservatory of Music concert hall		1999	520	
Helsinki	Helsinki Music Centre		2011	1,700	Finnish Radio Symphony Orchestra, Helsinki Philharmonic Orchestra, Sibelius Academy
Helsinki	Kulttuuritalo	Aalto Hall	1958	1,388	
Helsinki	Sibelius Academy concert hall		1930	690	
Helsinki	Vuosali Hall		2001	320	
Jakobstad (Pietarsaari)	Campus Allegro	Schauman Salen	2013	360	Jakobstads Sinfonietta
Joensuu	Carelia Hall		1985	605	
Kauniainen (Grankulla)	Grankulla Svenska Skolcentrum	Nya Paviljongen	2002	500	
Kotka	Kotka Concert Hall		1907	463	Kymi Sinfonietta
Kuhmo	Kuhmo Arts Center	Lentua Hall	1993	668	
Kuopio	Kuopio Music Centre	Kuopio Music Centre Concert Hall	1985	1,050	Kuopio Symphony Orchestra
Kuusamo	Kuusamo Hall	Oulanka Hall	1996	532	
Lahti	Sibelius Hall		2000	1,250	Lahti Symphony Orchestra
Mariehamn	Alandica	Stora salen	2007	600	
Oulu	Oulu Music Center	Madetoja Hall	1983	816	Oulu Symphony Orchestra
Pori	Promenadikeskus	Promenadisali	1999	700	Porin Sinfonetta
Porvoo	Taidetehdas	Avanti Hall	2012	800	
Rovaniemi	Korundi		2011	340	Lapland Chamber Orchestra
Savonlinna	Savonlinna Hall		2002	800	
Tampere	Tampere Hall		1990	1,756	Tampere Philharmonic Orchestra
Turku	Logomo		2011	3,000	
Turku	Turku Concert Hall		1952	1,002	Turku Philharmonic Orchestra
Turku	Turku Conservatory of Music	Sigyn hall	1992	350	
Vantaa	Martinus Hall		1987	410	

=== France ===
Location	Venue	Room	Date built	Seats	Resident organizations
Evian-les-Bains	La Grange au Lac		1993	1,180	
Lille	Nouveau Siècle			2,000	Orchestre National de Lille
Lyon	Auditorium Maurice-Ravel		1975	2,150	Orchestre National de Lyon
Lyon	Théâtre Molière			608	
Marseille	Opéra de Marseille		1787	1,823	
Metz	Arsenal de Metz	Grand Hall	1989	1,354	Orchestre National de Metz
Metz	Arsenal de Metz	Esplanade Hall	1989	352	
Nancy	Salle Jean Poirel	Salle de spectacles	1889	883	
Paris	Maison de la Radio	Grand Auditorium	2014	1,462	Orchestre philharmonique de Radio France, Orchestre national de France, Chœur de Radio France, Maîtrise de Radio France
Paris	Maison de la Radio	Salle Olivier Messiaen	1963	852	
Paris	Opéra Bastille	Grand Salle	1989	2,703	Opéra national de Paris, Orchestre de l'Opéra de Paris
Paris	Opéra Bastille	Amphithéâtre	1989	500	
Paris	Opéra Bastille	Studio	1989	237	
Paris	Opéra Garnier		1875	1,979	
Paris	Philharmonie de Paris	Concert Hall	2014	2,400	Orchestre de Paris
Paris	L'Olympia	Concert Hall	1893	1,985	
Paris	Salle Pleyel		1927	1,913	Orchestre de Paris and Orchestre Philharmonique de Radio France (until 2015)
Paris	Théâtre des Champs-Élysées		1913	1,905	Orchestre National de France
Paris	Théâtre Mogador		1913	1,800	Orchestre de Paris, formerly (when Pleyel was under renovation)
Paris	Salle Wagram		1865	800	Orchestre Colonne
Strasbourg	Strasbourg Opera House		1821	1,142	Opéra national du Rhin
Strasbourg	Palais des Fêtes		1903	1,080	Orchestre philharmonique de Strasbourg (until 1975)
Strasbourg	Palais de la musique et des congrès	Salle Erasme	1974	1,950	Orchestre philharmonique de Strasbourg (since 1975)
Strasbourg	Palais de la musique et des congrès	Salle Schweitzer	1974	893	
Strasbourg	Cité de la musique et de la danse	Auditorium	2006	500	
Toulouse	Théâtre du Capitole		1818	1,156	Théâtre du Capitole: Opéra, Choeur & Ballet du Capitole
Toulouse	Halle aux Grains		1861/1974	2,500	Orchestre national du Capitole de Toulouse

=== Germany ===
Location	Venue	Room	Date built	Seats	Resident organizations
Augsburg	Kongress am Park	Kongresssaal	1972 (rebuilt 2012)	1,430	Augsburger Philharmoniker
Bad Salzuflen	Konzerthalle Bad Salzuflen		1963	1,200	Nordwestdeutsche Philharmonie
Baden-Baden	Festspielhaus Baden-Baden		1998	2,500	
Bamberg	Konzert und Kongresshalle	Joseph-Keilberth-Saal	1993	1,400	Bamberger Symphoniker
Bad Kissingen	Regentenbau	Großer Saal; Rossinisaal; Grüner Saal	1913	1,160; 280; 120	Festival Kissinger Sommer
Bad Wörishofen	Kurhaus				
Bayreuth	Bayreuth Festspielhaus		1872	1,900	Bayreuth Festival
Berlin	Berliner Philharmonie	Großer Saal	1963	2,440	Berlin Philharmonic Orchestra
Berlin	Berliner Philharmonie	Kammermusiksaal (Chamber Music Hall)	1987	1,180	
Berlin	Berlin State Opera		1743/1844/1955	1,396	Berlin State Opera
Berlin	Barenboim–Said Academy	Pierre Boulez Saal	2016	622	
Berlin	Deutsche Oper Berlin		1961	1,954	Deutsche Oper Berlin
Berlin	Berlin University of the Arts	Konzertsaal (UdK Concert Hall)	1954	1,255	
Berlin	Konzerthaus Berlin		1984	1,600	Konzerthausorchester Berlin
Bielefeld	Rudolf-Oetker-Halle	Großer Saal	1930	1,561; 300	Kulturamt Bielefeld
Bochum	Anneliese Brost Musikforum Ruhr	Großer Saal	2016	1,026	Bochumer Symphoniker
Bochum	Jahrhunderthalle Bochum		2003		Ruhrtriennale
Bonn	Beethovenhalle	Großer Saal	1959	1,980	Beethoven Orchester Bonn
Braunschweig	Stadthalle Braunschweig				
Bremen	Die Glocke		1926		Glocke Veranstaltungs GmbH
Cologne	Kölner Philharmonic		1986	2,000	WDR Symphony Orchestra Cologne
Cottbus	Staatstheater Cottbus	Großes Haus	1908		Philharmonisches Staatsorchester Cottbus
Darmstadt	Staatstheater Darmstadt	Großes Haus	1972	956	Staatsorchester Darmstadt
Duisburg	de:Mercatorhalle	Großer Saal	2007	1,746	Duisburg Philharmonic
Dortmund	Konzerthaus Dortmund		2002	1,500	Dortmunder Philharmoniker
Dresden	Semperoper		1878/1956/1985	1,300	Sächsische Staatsoper Dresden, Staatskapelle Dresden
Dresden	Kulturpalast		1969 (rebuilt 2017)	1,800	Dresdner Philharmonie
Düsseldorf	Tonhalle Düsseldorf		1926	1,933	
Essen	Saalbau Essen	Alfried Krupp Saal	1949	1,906	Essener Philharmoniker
Frankfurt	Alte Oper	Großer Saal	1880 (rebuilt 1981)	2,500	hr-Sinfonieorchester
Frankfurt	Alte Oper	Mozart-Saal	1880 (rebuilt 1981)	700	
Frankfurt	Oper Frankfurt		1951	1,369	
Frankfurt	Jahrhunderthalle	Kuppelsaal	1963	4,800	
Frankfurt	HR Sendesaal	Großer Saal	1954	868	
Freiburg	de:Konzerthaus Freiburg		1996	1,744	SWR Baden-Baden and Freiburg Symphony Orchestra
Friedrichshafen	Graf-Zeppelin-Haus	Hugo-Eckener-Saal	1985	1,300	
Hamburg	Elbphilharmonie	Großer Konzertsaal	2017	2,150 and 550	NDR Elbphilharmonie Orchestra
Hamburg	Hamburg State Opera	Großer Saal	1955	1,690	Hamburg Philharmonic State Orchestra
Hamburg	Laeiszhalle	Großer Saal	1904	2,023	Hamburg Symphony Orchestra
Halle (Saale)	Georg-Friedrich-Händel Halle	Großer Saal	1998	672	Staatskapelle Halle
	Oper Halle	Großer Saal	1884	1.400	Staatskapelle Halle
Hanover	Staatsoper Hanover		1845	1,200	Niedersächsisches Staatsorchester Hannover
Hanover	Stadthalle Hannover	Kuppelsaal	1914	3,573	
Hanover	Theater am Aegi		1953 (rebuilt 1967)	1,110	
Hanover	NDR Landesfunkhaus	Großer Sendesaal	1963		NDR Radiophilharmonie
Heidelberg	Kongresshaus Stadthalle Heidelberg		1903		Philharmonische Orchester Heidelberg
Kaiserslautern	Fruchthalle	Festsaal	1846 (rebuilt 2006)		
Karlsruhe	Konzerthaus Karlsruhe	Großer Saal	1915	1,000	
Krefeld	Seidenweberhaus		1976		
Kronberg im Taunus	Casals Forum		2022	550	Kronberg Academy
Kiel	Kieler Schloss	Konzertsaal		1,209	Philharmonisches Orchester Kiel
Künzelsau	Carmen Würth Forum				
Leipzig	Gewandhaus		1981	1,900	Leipzig Gewandhaus Orchestra
Leipzig	Kongreßhalle Leipzig		1899 (rebuilt 2015)		
Lübeck	Musik und Kongresshalle Lübeck	Konzertsaal	1994	1,900	
Ludwigshafen	Philharmonie				Deutsche Staatsphilharmonie Rheinland-Pfalz
Ludwigshafen	BASF-Feierabendhaus	Festsaal	1913 (rebuilt 2011)		
Mannheim	m:con Congress Center Rosengarten	Mozartsaal	1904 (rebuilt 2007)		
Mönchengladbach	Kaiser-Friedrich-Halle	Festsaal	1903		
Munich	Gasteig	Philharmonie	1985	2,387	Münchner Philharmoniker
Munich	Herkulessaal		1953	1,270	Bavarian Radio Symphony Orchestra
Munich	Prinzregententheater	Großes Haus	1901	1,083	
Munich	Nationaltheater		1818 (1825, 1963)	2,100	Bayerisches Staatsorchester
Neu-Isenburg	Hugenottenhalle		1977	1,040	
Nuremberg	Meistersingerhalle	Großer Saal, Kleiner Saal	1963	2,121; 520	Nuremberg Symphony Orchestra
Nuremberg	Kongresshalle	Serenadenhof	1935/1963	515	
Osnabrück	OsnabrückHalle	Europa-Saal	rebuilt 2013	1,760	
Regensburg	Auditorium Maximum Regensburg			1,472	Odeon Concerte Regensburg
Saarbrücken	Congresshalle	Großer Saal	1967	1,300	
Stuttgart	de:Kultur und Kongresszentrum Liederhalle	Beethovensaal; Hegelsaal; Mozartsaal	1956	2,100; 1,900; 752	
Viersen	Festhalle Viersen				
Weimar	congress centrum neue weimarhalle	Weimarhalle: Großer Saal	1999	1,200	
Wiesbaden	Hessisches Staatstheater Wiesbaden	Großes Haus	1894	1,041	
Wiesbaden	Kurhaus Wiesbaden	Friedrich-von-Thiersch-Saal	1907	1,350	
Wolfsburg	Scharoun-Theater		1973		
Wuppertal	de:Stadthalle Wuppertal	Großer Saal	1896	2,000	Historische Stadthalle Wuppertal GmbH

=== Greece ===
Location	Venue	Room	Date built	Seats	Resident organizations
Athens	Stavros Niarchos Foundation Cultural Center	Stavros Niarchos Hall	2016	1,400	Greek National Opera
Athens	Stavros Niarchos Foundation Cultural Center	Alternative Stage	2016	400	Greek National Opera
Athens	Olympia Theatre	Maria Callas Hall	1958	650	
Athens	Athens Concert Hall	Christos Lambrakis Hall (former Friends of Music Hall)	1991	1,961	Armonia Atenea – The Friends of Music Orchestra
Athens	Athens Concert Hall	Christos Lambrakis Hall (former Friends of Music Hall)	1991	1,961	Athens State Orchestra
Athens	Athens Concert Hall	Alexandra Trianti Hall	2004	1,750	Greek Youth Symphony Orchestra
Athens	Athens Concert Hall	Dimitris Mitropoulos Hall	1991	450	Camerata Junior
Athens	Athens Concert Hall	Nikos Skalkotas Hall	2004	400	Camerata Junior
Athens	Onassis Cultural Centre	Main stage	2004	880	Armonia Atenea – The Friends of Music Orchestra
Athens	Badminton Theater	Auditorium	2007	2,430	
Ermoupoli	Apollon Theatre (Ermoupoli)		1864	350	
Heraklion	Cultural and Conference Center of Heraklion	Andreas and Maria Kalokerinou Hall	2019	750	
Patras	Apollon Theatre (Patras)		1872	300	
Piraeus	Piraeus Municipal Theatre		1895	600	
Thessaloniki	Thessaloniki Concert Hall	Friends of Music Hall	2000	1,464	
Thessaloniki	Thessaloniki Concert Hall	Aimilios Riadis Hall	2000	500	

=== Hungary ===
Location	Venue	Room	Date built	Seats	Resident organizations
Budapest	Erkel Opera Theatre		1911	2,400	
Budapest	Franz Liszt Academy of Music	Great Hall	1907	1,100	
Budapest	Hungarian State Opera House		1884	1261	Hungarian State Opera, Hungarian National Ballet, Budapest Philharmonic Orchestra
Budapest	Palace of Arts	Béla Bartók National Concert Hall	2005	1,699	
Budapest	Palace of Arts	Festival Theater	2005	452	
Budapest	Vigadó Concert Hall		1859		
Budapest	Budapest Congress Center	Patria Hall	1984	1,800	
Miskolc	House of Arts		2006	600	Hungarian Symphony Orchestra Miskolc
Miskolc	Palace of Music		1927	400	
Pécs	Kodály Centre	Concert Hall	2010	999	Pannon Philharmonic, Pécs Cultural Centre
Szombathely	Bartók Hall		2007	400	Savaria Symphony Orchestra

=== Iceland ===
Location	Venue	Room	Date built	Seats	Resident organizations
Akureyri	Hof	Hamraborg	2010	510	North Iceland Symphony Orchestra
Akureyri	Hof	Hamrar	2010	200	
Reykjavík	Harpa	Eldborg	2011	1,600	Iceland Symphony Orchestra, The Icelandic Opera
Reykjavík	Harpa	Silfurberg	2011	750	
Reykjavík	Harpa	Norðurljós	2011	450	
Reykjavík	Harpa	Kaldalón	2011	195	
Kópavogur	Salurinn	Salurinn	1999	298	

=== Ireland (Republic of) ===
Location	Venue	Room	Date built	Seats	Resident organizations
Cork	City Hall	Concert Hall	1935	960	Cork Opera House
Dublin	Bord Gáis Energy Theatre	Main Auditorium	2009	2,100	
Dublin	Gaiety Theatre	Main Auditorium	1871	1,500	
Dublin	The Helix	The Mahony Hall	2002	1,260	Chamber Choir Ireland
Dublin	Liberty Hall	Main Auditorium	1960	1,200	
Dublin	National Concert Hall	Main Auditorium	1981	1,200	RTÉ National Symphony Orchestra
Dublin	3Olympia Theatre	Main Auditorium	1879	1,500	The Lark Balbriggan
Limerick	University Concert Hall		1993	1,000	
Wexford	National Opera House	O'Reilly Theatre	2008	771	Wexford Festival Opera

=== Italy ===
Location	Venue	Room	Date built	Seats	Resident organizations
Bari	Teatro Petruzzelli		1903	1,482	
Bologna	Teatro Comunale di Bologna		1763	1,034	
	Teatro Auditorium Manzoni		1933		
Brindisi	Nuovo Teatro Verdi		2006	1,000	
Catania	Teatro Massimo Bellini		1890	1,200	
Florence	Teatro della Pergola	Sala Grande	1656	1,500	
Florence	Teatro Comunale Florence		1862	2,000	Maggio Musicale Fiorentino
Florence		Large Hall	2014	1,800	Maggio Musicale Fiorentino
Genoa	Teatro Carlo Felice		1991	2,000	Giovine Orchestra Genovese
Milan	Auditorium di Milano		1999	1,253	Orchestra Sinfonica Giuseppe Verdi; Coro di Milano
Milan	Teatro dal Verme		2001	1,436	Orchestra "I Pomeriggi Musicali"
Milan	Teatro degli Arcimboldi		2002	2,375	
Milan	Teatro alla Scala (La Scala)	Platea (The Main Floor)	1778	2,013	La Scala Theatre Ballet; La Scala Theatre Orchestra; La Scala Theatre Chorus
Modena	Teatro Comunale Luciano Pavarotti		1841	900	
Naples	Teatro di San Carlo		1737	1,414	
Palermo	Teatro Massimo		1897	1,387	
Rome	Auditorium Conciliazione		1950	1,740	
Rome	Auditorium "Ennio Morricone"			1,000	Orchestra Roma Sinfonietta
Rome	Parco della Musica	Santa Cecilia Hall	2003	2,756	Accademia Nazionale di Santa Cecilia
Rome	Parco della Musica	Sinopoli Hall	2002	1,133	Parco della Musica Jazz Orchestra
Rome	Parco della Musica	Petrassi Hall	2002	673	
Rome	Parco della Musica	Teatro Studio Hall	2002	350	
Rome	Teatro Quirino		1871		
Rome	Teatro Argentina		1732	696	Former opera house
Rome	Teatro Sistina		1949	1,600	
Rome	Teatro Olimpico		1936	1,410	
Rome	Teatro Brancaccio		1916	1,300	
Trieste	Teatro Lirico Giuseppe Verdi		1801	1,300	
Turin	it:Auditorium Rai di Torino "Arturo Toscanini"		1952	1,587	Orchestra sinfonica nazionale della RAI
Turin	it:Auditorium "Gianni Agnelli"		1994	1,901	
Turin	Teatro Regio		1740 / 1973	1,582	Orchestra & Chorus Teatro Regio Torino; Filarmonica Teatro Regio Torino
Turin	it:Sala Concerti Conservatorio		1936	686	Orchestra Filarmonica di Torino; Unione Musicale
Venice	Teatro La Fenice		1792	1,000	
Venice	Teatro Malibran		1678	900	

=== Latvia ===
Location	Venue	Room	Date built	Seats	Resident organizations
Liepāja	Great Amber Concert Hall		2015		Liepāja Symphony Orchestra

=== Luxembourg ===
Location	Venue	Room	Date built	Seats	Resident organizations
Luxembourg City	Conservatoire de Luxembourg	Conservatoire Auditorium	1967		
Luxembourg City	Philharmonie Luxembourg	Grand Auditorium	2005	1,307	Luxembourg Philharmonic Orchestra

=== Netherlands ===
Location	Venue	Room	Date built	Seats	Resident organizations
Amstelveen	P60	Grote Zaal	2001	650	
Amsterdam	Concertgebouw	Grote Zaal	1888	2,037	Royal Concertgebouw Orchestra
Amsterdam	Dutch National Opera & Ballet		1986	1,633	Dutch National Opera, Dutch National Ballet, Holland Symfonia
Amsterdam	Paradiso	Grote Zaal	1986	1,500	
Amsterdam	Melkweg	The Max	2007	1,500	
Amsterdam	Melkweg	Oude Zaal	1973	700	
Amsterdam	Muziekgebouw aan 't IJ	Grote Zaal	2005	725	
Arnhem	Luxor Live	Grote zaal	1921	700	
Arnhem	Luxor Live	Kleine zaal	1921 (renovated 2014)	200	
Arnhem	Musis Sacrum	Muzenzaal	1847	870	
Arnhem	Musis Sacrum	Parkzaal	2017	1,000	Phion, orkest van Gelderland & Overijssel
Eindhoven	Muziekgebouw Frits Philips	De Lage Landen Zaal			
Nijmegen	Doornroosje	Rode Zaal	2014	1,100	
Nijmegen	Doornroosje	Paarse Zaal	2014	400	
Nijmegen	De Vereeniging	Grote Zaal	1915	1,450	
Nijmegen	De Vereeniging	Kleine Zaal	1917	220	
Haarlem	Philharmonie Haarlem	Grote Zaal	1872	1,228	
Heerlen	Parkstad Limburg Theater	RABOzaal	1961	1,103	
Leiden	Stedelijk Concertgebouw	Stadsgehoorzaal	1891	662	
Rotterdam	De Doelen	Grote Zaal (Great Hall)	1966	2,700	Rotterdam Philharmonic Orchestra
The Hague	Dr. Anton Philips Hall	Grote Zaal (Great Hall)	1987	1,800	Residentie Orchestra
Tilburg	013	Main	2015	3,000	
Tilburg	013	Next Stage	2015	700	
Utrecht	TivoliVredenburg	Ronda	2014	2,000	
Utrecht	TivoliVredenburg	Grote Zaal	1979	1,717	
Utrecht	TivoliVredenburg	Pandora	2014	650	
Utrecht	TivoliVredenburg	Hertz	2014	534	
Utrecht	TivoliVredenburg	Cloud Nine	2014	270–450	
Utrecht	TivoliVredenburg	Club Nine	2014	100–150	

=== Norway ===
Location	Venue	Room	Date built	Seats	Resident organizations
Bergen	Grieg Hall	Griegsalen	1978	1,500	Bergen Philharmonic Orchestra
Bodø	Stormen Concert Hall	Concert Hall	2014	900	
Kristiansand	Kilden Performing Arts Centre	Concert Hall	2011	1,200	Kristiansand Symphony Orchestra
Oslo	Oslo Concert Hall	Main Hall and Small Hall	1977	1,630; 266	Oslo Philharmonic
Oslo	Oslo Opera House	Main Hall and Two Smaller Halls	2007	1,364; 200; 400	Norwegian National Opera and Ballet
Oslo	Norwegian Broadcasting Corporation	Store Studio, Marienlyst	1950	250	Norwegian Radio Orchestra
Stavanger	Stavanger Konserthus	Fartein Valen	2012	1,500	Stavanger Symphony Orchestra
Trondheim	Olavshallen Concert Hall	Main Hall and Small Hall	1989	1,200	Trondheim Symphony Orchestra

=== Poland ===
Location	Venue	Room	Date built	Seats	Resident organizations
Bielsko-Biała	Cavatina Hall	concert hall	2022	1,000	Cavatina Hall Symphony Orchestra
Bydgoszcz	Opera Nova	Main Hall	2006	803	
Bydgoszcz	Pomeranian Philharmonic	Concert Hall	1958	880	Pomeranian Philharmonic Orchestra
Częstochowa	Częstochowa Philharmonic	Concert Hall	1965	825	Symphony Orchestra of the Częstochowa Philharmonic
Gdańsk	Polish Baltic Philharmonic	Concert Hall	1993	1,100	Polish Baltic Philharmonic Orchestra
Katowice	Silesian Philharmonic	Concert Hall	1945	424	Silesian Philharmonic Orchestra
Katowice	NOSPR	Concert Hall	2014	1,800	National Polish Radio Symphony Orchestra
Kraków	Kraków Philharmonic	Concert Hall	1931	693	Kraków Philharmonic Orchestra
Kraków	ICE KRAKÓW Congress Centre	Main Hall	2014	1,791–1,915	
Łódź	Łódź Philharmonic	Concert Hall	2004	659	Łódź Philharmonic
Poznań	Tadeusz Szeligowski Poznań Philharmonic	Aula UAM	1910	859	Poznań Philharmonic Orchestra
Rzeszów	Rzeszów Philharmonic	Concert Hall	1955	800	Rzeszów Philharmonic Orchestra
Szczecin	Szczecin Philharmonic	Concert Hall	2014	953	Szczecin Philharmonic Orchestra
Warsaw	Warsaw Philharmonic	Concert Hall	1901	1,072	Warsaw National Philharmonic Orchestra
Warsaw	Polish Radio	Witold Lutosławski Concert Studio	1991	410	
Wrocław	National Forum of Music	Concert Hall	2015	1,800	NFM Wrocław Philharmonic

=== Portugal ===
Location	Venue	Room	Date built	Seats	Resident organizations
Lisbon	Calouste Gulbenkian Foundation	Auditório 2	1969	334	
Lisbon	Calouste Gulbenkian Foundation	Grande Auditório Calouste Gulbenkian	1969	1,300	Orquestra e Coro da Fundação Calouste Gulbenkian
Lisbon	Belém Cultural Center	Grande Auditório	1992	1,429	Portuguese Chamber Orchestra
Lisbon	Belém Cultural Center	Pequeno Auditório	1992	310	
Lisbon	Teatro Nacional de São Carlos		1793	1,148	Portuguese Symphony Orchestra
Lisbon	Coliseu dos Recreios	Portuguese Hall	1890	2,846	
Porto	Casa da Música		2005	1,238	Orquestra Nacional do Porto
Porto	Coliseu do Porto		1908		
Coimbra	Teatro Académico Gil Vicente		1961	764	
Faro	Teatro das Figuras		2005	800	
Póvoa de Varzim	Auditório Municipal da Póvoa de Varzim			304	Orquestra Sinfónica da Póvoa de Varzim

=== Romania ===
Location	Venue	Room	Date built	Seats	Resident organizations
Arad	Arad Cultural Palace	Main Hall	1913	480	Arad State Philharmonic
Bacău	Bacău Philharmonic House	Ateneu Hall	1983	400	Mihail Jora Philharmonic Orchestra
Botoșani	Botoșani Cultural House	Main Hall	1986	700	Botoșani Philharmonic Orchestra
Brașov	Brașov Philharmonic House	Patria Hall	1962	458	Brașov Philharmonic Orchestra
Brașov	Brașov Opera House	Main Hall	1938	358	Brașov Opera
Bucharest	National Opera House	Main Hall	1954	952	Bucharest Romanian National Opera
Bucharest	National Opera House	Yellow Foyer	1954	200	Bucharest Romanian National Opera
Bucharest	National Operetta House	Main Hall	2015	550	Ion Dacian National Operetta Theatre
Bucharest	Romanian Athenaeum	Main Hall	1888	794	George Enescu Philharmonic Orchestra
Bucharest	Romanian Athenaeum	Small Hall	1888	100	George Enescu Philharmonic Orchestra
Bucharest	Sala Palatului	Main Hall	1960	4,060	George Enescu Festival
Bucharest	Sala Radio	Mihail Jora Concert Studio	1961	941	National Radio Orchestra of Romania
Cluj-Napoca	Cluj-Napoca National Theatre	Main Hall	1906	928	Cluj-Napoca Romanian National Opera
Cluj-Napoca	State Hungarian Theatre of Cluj	Main Hall	1910	862	Cluj-Napoca Hungarian Opera
Cluj-Napoca	Academic College	Auditorium Maximum	1937	860	Transylvania Philharmonic Orchestra
Cluj-Napoca	Music Academy Performance Hall	Studio Hall		200	Transylvania Philharmonic Orchestra
Constanța	Constanța National Opera and Ballet Theatre	Main Hall	1958	431	Oleg Danovski National Opera and Ballet Theatre
Craiova	Oltenia Philharmonic House	Main Hall		398	Oltenia Philharmonic Orchestra
Craiova	Carol I National College	Main Hall	1895	360	Craiova Romanian Opera
Galați	Galați Musical Theatre	Main Hall	1956	410	Nae Leonard National Opera and Operetta Theatre
Iași	Iași National Theatre	Main Hall	1896	750	Iași Romanian National Opera
Iași	Iași Philharmonic House	Ion Baciu Hall	1910	560	Moldova Philharmonic Orchestra
Iași	Central University Library	Aula	1934	330	Moldova Philharmonic Orchestra
Iași	Students' Culture House	Gaudeamus Hall	1962	477	Moldova Philharmonic Orchestra
Pitești	Pitești Multifunctional Center	Bucharest Hall	1958	404	Pitești Philharmonic Orchestra
Ploiești	Ploiești Philharmonic House	Ion Baciu Hall	1947	280	Paul Constantinescu Philharmonic Orchestra
Satu Mare	Satu Mare Philharmonic House	Dacia Hall	1902	400	Dinu Lipatti State Philharmonic Orchestra
Sibiu	Thalia Hall	Main Hall	1788	482	Sibiu State Philharmonic Orchestra
Târgu Mureș	Palace of Culture	Concert Hall	1913	700	Constantin Silvestri Philharmonic Orchestra
Târgu Mureș	Palace of Culture	Small Hall	1913	200	Constantin Silvestri Philharmonic Orchestra
Timișoara	Banatul Philharmonic House	Capitol Hall	1930	800	Banatul Philharmonic Orchestra
Timișoara	Timișoara National Theatre	Main Hall	1875	686	Timișoara Romanian National Opera

=== Russia ===
Location	Venue	Room	Date built	Seats	Resident organizations
Moscow	Bolshoi Theatre		1824/1856/2011	2,500	
Moscow	Crocus City Hall		2009	6,200	Crocus Group
Moscow	Moscow Conservatory	Great Hall	1901	1,737	
Moscow	Moscow International Performing Arts Center	Svetlanov Hall	2003	1,716	National Philharmonic of Russia
Moscow	Tchaikovsky Concert Hall		1901	1,505	Moscow Philharmonic Orchestra
Saint Petersburg	Mariinsky Theatre		1860	1,609	

=== Serbia ===
Location	Venue	Room	Date built	Seats	Resident organizations
Belgrade	Ilija M. Kolarac Endowment (Zadužbina Ilije M. Kolarca)	Great Hall	1932	883	Belgrade Philharmonic Orchestra

=== Slovakia ===
Location	Venue	Room	Date built	Seats	Resident organizations
Banská Bystrica	Národný dom	State Opera Hall	1929	308	State Opera
Bratislava	Reduta	Concert Hall of Slovak Philharmonic	1919	700	Slovak Philharmonic, Slovak Chamber Orchestra
Bratislava	Slovak Radio Building	Big Concert Studio	1983	522	Slovak Radio Symphony Orchestra
Bratislava	Main building of the Faculty of Arts, Comenius University	Moyzes Hall	1913	220	
Bratislava	Historical building of the Slovak National Theatre		1886	611	Slovak National Theatre
Košice	Dom umenia		1962	700	The Slovak State Philharmonic Košice
Košice	Historical building of the State Theatre Košice		1899	575	State Theatre Košice
Žilina	Dom umenia Fatra		1921	318	The State Chamber Orchestra Žilina

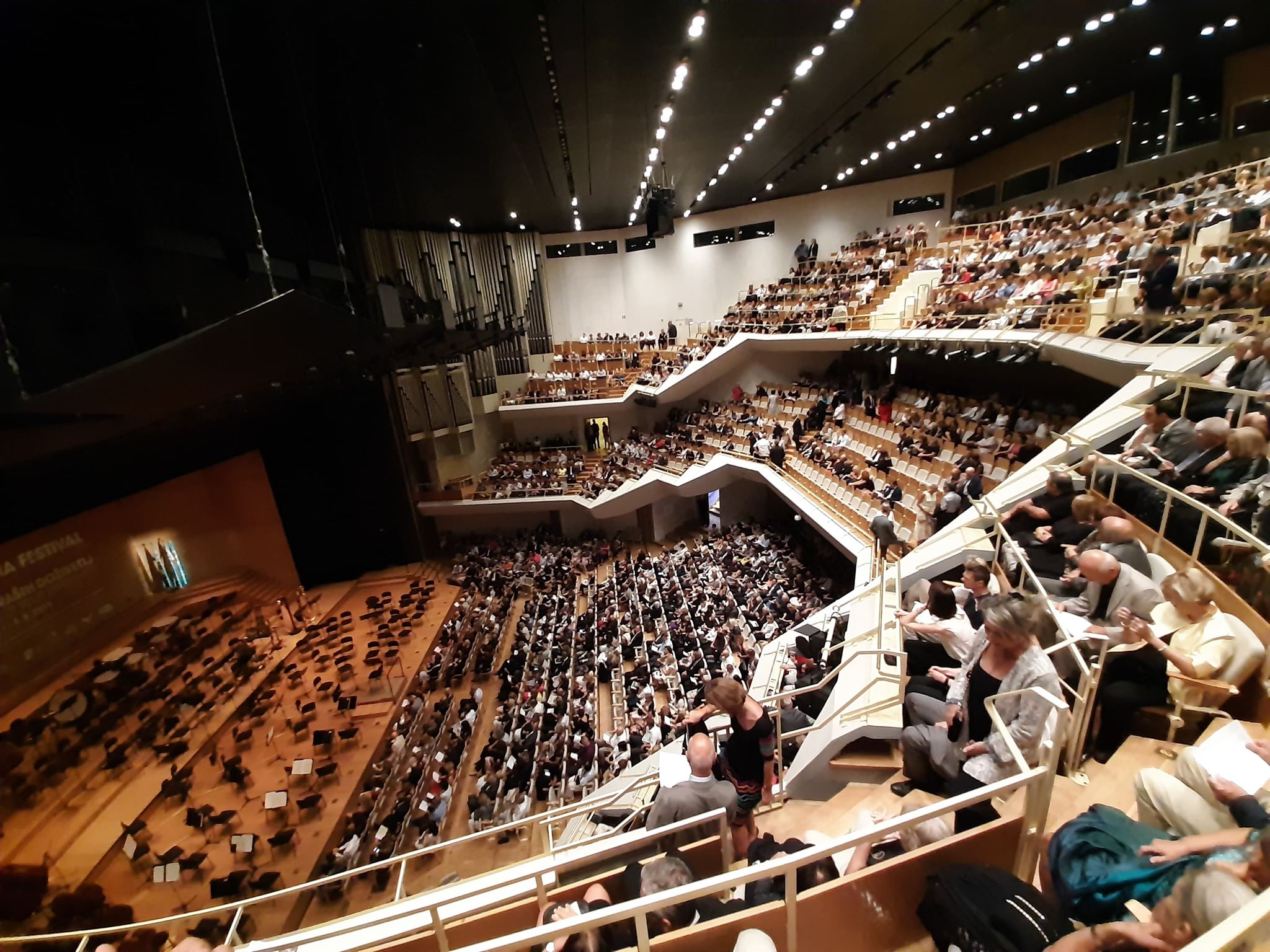
Gallus' Hall in Cankar Centre.

=== Slovenia ===
Location	Venue	Room	Date built	Seats	Resident organizations
Ljubljana	Cankar Centre	Gallus' Hall	1980/1982	1,545	
Ljubljana	Slovenian Philharmonic	Marjan Kozina' Hall	1891	310	Slovenian Philharmonic Orchestra
Maribor	Slovene national theatre Maribor	Grand Hall	1994	800	Slovene national theatre Maribor

=== Spain ===
Location	Venue	Room	Date built	Seats	Resident organizations
Barcelona	L'Auditori	Alicia de Larrocha	1999	152	
Barcelona	L'Auditori	Tete Montoliu	1999	400	
Barcelona	L'Auditori	Oriol Martorell	1999	600	
Barcelona	L'Auditori	Sala Pau Casals	1999	2,200	Orquestra Simfònica de Barcelona i Nacional de Catalunya
Barcelona	Liceu		1847	2,292	Orquestra Simfònica del Gran Teatre del Liceu
Barcelona	Palau de la Música Catalana		1908	2,049	Orquestra Simfònica de Barcelona i Nacional de Catalunya, until 1999; Orquestra Simfònica del Vallès
Bilbao	Euskalduna Conference Centre and Concert Hall	Auditorium	1999	2,164	Bilbao Symphony Orchestra, ABAO
El Escorial	es:Teatro Real Coliseo de Carlos III		1771		
Huesca	Teatro Olimpia		1925	772	
Huesca	es:Palacio de Congresos (Huesca)	Auditorio	2008	782	
Ferrol	Auditorio de Ferrol				
Girona	ca:Teatre Municipal de Girona	Main Hall	1878	1,300	
Girona	Auditori i Palau de Congressos de Girona	Sala Montsalvatge – Concert Hall	2006	1,200	Cor Geriona
Las Palm3s de Gran Canaria	es:Auditorio Alfredo Kraus	main hall	1997	2,000	Festival de Música de Canarias
Lleida	Auditori Enric Granados	main hall	1995	803	Orquestra Simfònica Julià Carbonell de les Terres de Lleida, Jove Orquestra de Ponent, Cor de cambra de l'Auditori Enric Granados, Banda Municipal de Lleida, Banda Simfònica Unió Musical de Lleida, Col·lectiu Free't, LleidArt Ensemble, Quartet Teixidor, Veus.kat
Madrid	Teatro Real	Sala Auditorio	1850	1,749	Orquesta Sinfónica de Madrid
Madrid	Auditorio Nacional de Música	Sala Sinfónica	1988	2,324	Nacional de España,
Madrid	Teatro de la Zarzuela		1856	1,242	Community of Madrid Orchestra
Madrid	Teatro Monumental		1923	1,200	RTVE Symphony Orchestra
Pamplona	Auditorio Baluarte				Orquesta Sinfónica de Navarra
Sabadell	Teatre La Faràndula		1956	1,060	Orquestra Simfònica del Vallès, Associació d'Amics de l'Òpera de Sabadell
San Sebastián	Kursaal Palace	Palacio de Congresos, Auditorio Kursaal	1999	1,800	San Sebastián International Film Festival
Santiago de Compostela	Auditori de Galicia		1996		Real Filharmonía de Galicia
Santa Cruz de Tenerife	Auditorio de Tenerife	main hall	2003	1,616	Festival de Música de Canarias
Santander, Spain	Palacio de Festivales	Sala Argenta	1991	1,500	Festival Internacional de Santander
Seville	Teatro de la Maestranza		1991	1,800	Real Orquesta Sinfónica de Sevilla
Torrent	L'Auditori de Torrent	L'Auditori	1997	606	
Valencia	Palau de la Música de València	Sala José Iturbi	1987	1,813	Valencia Orchestra
Valencia	Palau de la Música de València	Sala Rodrigo	1987	423	
Valencia	Palau de les Arts Reina Sofia	Sala Principal	2005	1,700	Orquestra de la Comunitat Valenciana
Valencia	Palau de les Arts Reina Sofia	The Auditorium	2005	1,500	
Valencia	Palau de les Arts Reina Sofia	Aula Magistral	2005	400	
Valladolid	Centro Cultural Miguel Delibes			1,700	Orquesta Sinfónica de Castilla y León
Zaragoza	es:Palacio de Congresos de Zaragoza	Auditorio	2008	1,440	Orchestra Reino de Aragón

=== Sweden ===
Location	Venue	Room	Date built	Seats	Resident organizations
Gävle	Gävle Concert Hall	Gevaliasalen	1998	819	Gävle Symphony Orchestra
Gothenburg	Gothenburg Concert Hall		1935	1,300	Gothenburg Symphony Orchestra
Grängesberg	Cassels donation	Aulan	1900	450	
Helsingborg	Helsingborg Consert Hall		1932	840	Helsingborg Symphony Orchestra
Jönköping	Jönköping Concert Hall	Hammaskjöld Hall, Rydberg Hall	1990		
Jönköping	Jönköping Theatre (theatre also used for concerts)		1904		
Jönköping	Spira Culture Center (used for culture events, among them concerts)		2011	820	Jönköping Sinfonietta
Linköping	Linköping Konsert och Kongress				Östgötamusiken Norrköping Symphony Orchestra
Malmö	Malmö Live		2015	1,600	Malmö Symphony Orchestra
Norrköping	Louis de Geer konsert & kongress		1994	1,379	Norrköping Symphony Orchestra
Örebro	Örebro Konserthus		1932	700	Swedish Chamber Orchestra
Stockholm	Berwaldhallen		1979	1,300	Swedish Radio Symphony Orchestra
Stockholm	Eric Ericsonhallen (the former Skeppsholmen Church)		1842 (rebuilt 2009)	550	
Stockholm	Stockholm Concert Hall	Stora salen (Main Hall)	1926	1,770	Royal Stockholm Philharmonic Orchestra, Nobel Prize ceremonies
Stockholm	Stockholm Concert Hall	Grünewaldsalen	1926	460	
Stockholm	Stockholm Concert Hall	Aulinsalen	1926	154	
Uppsala	Uppsala Konsert & Kongress	Stora salen (Main Hall)	2007	1,140	
Uppsala	Uppsala Konsert & Kongress	Sal B (Hall B)	2007	340	
Uppsala	Uppsala Konsert & Kongress	Sal C (Hall C)	2007	120	
Uppsala	Uppsala Konsert & Kongress	Sal D (Hall D)	2007	900	
Vara	Vara Concert Hall		2003	517	
Västerås	Västerås Konserthus		2002	912	
Växjö	Växjö Concert Hall	Christina Nilsson Salen	1991	800	Växjö Symphony Orchestra

=== Switzerland ===
Location	Venue	Room	Date built	Seats	Resident organizations
Basel	Stadtcasino Basel	Grosser Musiksaal	1876	1,500	Sinfonieorchester Basel
Biel – Bienne	Kongresshaus Biel				
Geneva	Victoria Hall		1894	1,700	Orchestre de la Suisse Romande
Lucerne	Culture and Congress Centre		1998	1,892	Lucerne Festival and Luzerner Sinfonieorchester
Lausanne	Salle Métropole				Orchestre de chambre de Lausanne
Lausanne	Palais de Beaulieu		1921	1,844	
Lugano	Auditorio Stelio Molo				
Lugano	Lugano Arte e Cultura (LAC)		2015		
Solothurn	Konzertsaal Solothurn			590	
St. Gallen	Tonhalle St. Gallen				Sinfonieorchester St. Gallen
Thun	Kultur und Kongresszentrum Thun				
Zürich	Tonhalle		1895	1,455	Tonhalle Orchester Zürich

=== Ukraine ===
Location	Venue	Room	Date built	Seats	Resident organizations
Donetsk	Donetsk Theatre of Opera and Ballet		1940	976	
Kharkiv	Kharkiv Theatre of Opera and Ballet	Main Hall	1990	1,500	
Kyiv	National Opera of Ukraine (Kyiv Opera)		1898	1,650	National Opera of Ukraine
Lviv	Lviv Theatre of Opera and Ballet		1900		
Odesa	Odesa Opera and Ballet Theater		1810	1,636	
Odesa	Odesa Philharmonic Theater		1898	1,00	
Sevastopol	Lunacharsky Russian Drama Theater		1910	792	

=== United Kingdom ===
Location	Venue	Room	Date built	Seats	Resident organizations
Aberdeen	Music Hall		1859	1,281	Associate Visiting Orchestras include the Royal Scottish National Orchestra, the Scottish Chamber Orchestra and the BBC Scottish Symphony Orchestra.
Basingstoke	The Anvil, Basingstoke	The Anvil	1994	1,400	Associate visiting orchestras include the Philharmonia Orchestra.
Belfast	Ulster Hall		1862	1,000	
Belfast	Waterfront Hall	Main Auditorium	1997	2,223	Ulster Orchestra
Belfast	Waterfront Hall	Studio	1997	380	
Birmingham	Barber Institute	Barber Concert Hall	1932	349	The Barber Institute is home to Europe's finest art deco concert hall, and boasts a chamber music and recital series.
Birmingham	Birmingham Town Hall		1834	1,086	Ex Cathedra / Black Voices / BBC Big Band / Thomas Trotter
Birmingham	CBSO Centre	Main Hall	1998	300	Birmingham Contemporary Music Group
Birmingham	Birmingham Hippodrome		1895	1,935	Birmingham Royal Ballet and Royal Ballet Sinfonia
Birmingham	International Convention Centre	Symphony Hall	1991	2,266	City of Birmingham Symphony Orchestra
Birmingham	University of Birmingham	Elgar Concert Hall	2012	420	
Birmingham	Ruddock Performing Arts Centre	Ruddock Hall	2012	503	
Birmingham	Royal Birmingham Conservatoire	The Bradshaw Hall	2017	493	Orchestra of the Swan
Birmingham	Royal Birmingham Conservatoire	Recital Hall	2017	250	
Bradford	St George's Hall	Main Hall	1853	1,335	Yorkshire Symphony Orchestra and Leeds International Piano Competition, as well as associate visiting Orchestras such as The Hallé.
Bristol	Bristol Beacon		1867	2,075	Associate residency/visiting orchestras include the Bournemouth Symphony Orchestra.
Bristol	St George's Church, Brandon Hill		1823	580	
Cambridge	West Road Concert Hall	Main Hall	1978	499	Academy of Ancient Music, Britten Sinfonia
Cardiff	St David's Hall (Neuadd Dewi Sant)	National Concert Hall and Conference Centre of Wales	1982	2,000	BBC National Orchestra of Wales/Cardiff Philharmonic Orchestra, BBC Cardiff Singer of the World competition and Welsh Proms
Cardiff	Wales Millennium Centre	Donald Gordon Theatre	2004	1,897	Welsh National Opera, BBC National Orchestra of Wales and National Dance Company Wales
Cardiff	Wales Millennium Centre	BBC Hoddinott Hall	2009	349	
Cardiff	Wales Millennium Centre	Weston Studio Theatre	2004	250	
Coventry	Warwick Arts Centre	Butterworth Hall	1981	1,600	Coull Quartet, with Associate Orchestras including the Royal Philharmonic Orchestra.
Dundee	Caird Hall		1923	2,300	Dundee Symphony Orchestra
Edinburgh	Usher Hall		1914	2,200	Scottish Chamber Orchestra and Edinburgh Home of the Royal Scottish National Orchestra
Gateshead	The Glasshouse International Centre for Music	Hall One	2004	1,700	Royal Northern Sinfonia / Folkworks
Glasgow	Glasgow Royal Concert Hall		1990	2,500	Royal Scottish National Orchestra / BBC Scottish Symphony Orchestra
Glasgow	Glasgow City Halls		1840	1,036	BBC Scottish Symphony Orchestra
Glasgow	Theatre Royal		1867	1,541	Scottish Opera
Halifax	Victoria Theatre		1901	1,512	Halifax Choral Society
Huddersfield	Huddersfield Town Hall	Main Hall	1881	1,200	Huddersfield Choral Society, with Associate Orchestras including Halle Orchestra.
Kingston upon Hull	Hull City Hall		1909	1,200	Associate visiting orchestras include the Royal Philharmonic Orchestra
Leeds	Leeds Town Hall		1858	1,600	Orchestra of Opera North and Leeds International Piano Competition
Leeds	Grand Theatre, Leeds		1878	1,550	Opera North and Northern Ballet
Leicester	De Montfort Hall		1913	2,000	Associate Orchestras include the Philharmonia.
Liverpool	Yoko Ono Lennon Centre	Tung Auditorium	2022	400	
Liverpool	St George's Hall	Concert Room	1854	480	Royal Liverpool Philharmonic
Liverpool	Philharmonic Hall		1939	1,700	Royal Liverpool Philharmonic
London	Alexandra Palace	Great Hall	1875	10,250	
London	Alexandra Palace	West Hall	1988	2,500	Hosts a variety of opera, dance and classical concerts which include performances by the BBC Concert Orchestra
London	Barbican Centre	Barbican Hall	1982	1,943	London Symphony Orchestra / BBC Symphony Orchestra
London	Blackheath Halls	Great Hall	1895	600	Trinity College of Music
London	Cadogan Hall	Main Hall	1907	953	Royal Philharmonic Orchestra
London	Conway Hall	Main Hall	1929	450	The Sunday chamber music concert series is the longest-running of its kind in Europe.
London	Fairfield Halls	Concert Hall	1962	1,998	The London Mozart Players are the resident orchestra, whilst the Royal Philharmonic Orchestra are the main partnership (associate) orchestra.
London	Kings Place	Hall 1	2008	420	Orchestra of the Age of Enlightenment; London Sinfonietta / Aurora Orchestra
London	Kings Place	Hall 2	2008	220	Orchestra of the Age of Enlightenment; London Sinfonietta / Aurora Orchestra
London	London Coliseum		1904	2,359	English National Opera Orchestra English National Ballet Philharmonic
London	Milton Court	Concert Hall	2013	608	Guildhall School of Music and Drama
London	Silk Street Building	Silk Street Music Hall		196	Guildhall School of Music and Drama
London	Silk Street Building	Lecture Recital Room		80	Guildhall School of Music and Drama
London	Royal Academy of Music	Duke's Hall	1911	450	Royal Academy of Music
London	Royal Academy of Music	David Josefowitz Recital Hall	2001	150	Royal Academy of Music
London	Royal Albert Hall		1871	5,544	BBC Promenade Concerts ("The Proms") / Classic BRIT Awards
London	Royal College of Music	Amaryllis Fleming Concert Hall	1901	390	Royal College of Music
London	Royal College of Music	Recital Hall	1965	100	Royal College of Music
London	Royal Opera House	Main Auditorium	1858	2,256	The Royal Opera / The Royal Ballet; The Orchestra of the Royal Opera House
London	Royal Opera House	Linbury Studio Theatre	1999	400	The Royal Opera / The Royal Ballet; The Orchestra of the Royal Opera House
London	Southbank Centre	Royal Festival Hall	1951	2,788	London Philharmonic Orchestra; London Sinfonietta; Orchestra of the Age of Enlightenment; Philharmonia Orchestra
London	Southbank Centre	Purcell Room	1967	370	London Philharmonic Orchestra; London Sinfonietta; Orchestra of the Age of Enlightenment; Philharmonia Orchestra
London	Southbank Centre	Queen Elizabeth Hall	1967	900	London Philharmonic Orchestra; London Sinfonietta; Orchestra of the Age of Enlightenment; Philharmonia Orchestra
London	St John's, Smith Square		1728	780	London Chamber Orchestra
London	St Luke Old Street		1773	372	Aurora Orchestra
London	St Martin-in-the-Fields		1726	825	Academy of St Martin-in-the-Fields
London	Wigmore Hall		1901	554	
Manchester	Bridgewater Hall		1996	2,400	The Hallé; BBC Philharmonic; Manchester Camerata
Manchester	Royal Northern College of Music	RNCM Concert Hall		620	
Manchester	Royal Northern College of Music	Carole Nash Recital Room		100	
Manchester	Royal Northern College of Music	RNCM Theatre		607	
Manchester	Royal Northern College of Music	RNCM Studio Theatre		120	
Manchester	Chetham's School of Music	The Stoller Hall	2017	482	
Manchester	Chetham's School of Music	Carole Nash Hall	2012	100	
Newcastle	Newcastle City Hall		1927	2,135	Previous home of the Royal Northern Sinfonia before they moved in to The Glasshouse International Centre for Music in 2004.
Nottingham	Royal Concert Hall		1982	2,499	Associate Orchestras include the Royal Philharmonic Orchestra, the Nottingham Symphony Orchestra and BBC Concert Orchestra.
Oxford	Sheldonian Theatre		1668	1,000	Oxford Philharmonic Orchestra
Oxford	Oxford Town Hall		1897	500	
Oxford	Holywell Music Room		1748	200	
Perth	Perth Concert Hall	Gannochy Auditorium	2005	1,200	Associate Orchestras include the Royal Scottish National Orchestra.
Poole	The Lighthouse	Concert Hall	1978	1,500	Bournemouth Symphony Orchestra
Portsmouth	Portsmouth Guildhall			2,000	Associate visiting orchestras include Bournemouth Symphony Orchestra.
Sheffield	Sheffield City Hall	Oval Hall	1932	2,271	Associate visiting orchestras include The Hallé.
Snape, Suffolk	Snape Maltings		1967	832	Britten-Pears Orchestra and Aldeburgh Festival, with Associate Orchestras including the BBC Philharmonic Orchestra.
Southampton	Turner Sims	Main Auditorium	1974	450	Southampton University Symphony Orchestra , the Southampton Philharmonic Choir , and the main Associate Orchestras the Bournemouth Symphony Orchestra.
Stoke-on-Trent	Victoria Hall		1888	1,853	Associate Orchestras include The Hallé and the BBC Philharmonic Orchestra.
Swansea	Brangwyn Hall		1934	1,070	Associate visiting orchestras include the BBC National Orchestra of Wales.
Watford	Watford Colosseum		1938	2,000	BBC Concert Orchestra, as well as various film soundtracks, including The Sound of Music, Sleepy Hollow, and The Lord of the Rings. The soprano Maria Callas recorded two albums at the venue, whilst Luciano Pavarotti recorded Hymn of the Nations by Giuseppe Verdi at the Watford Colosseum, which was previously known as the Assembly Rooms.
York	Sir Jack Lyons Concert Hall		1969	350	

== North America and the Caribbean ==
=== Canada ===
Province	Location	Venue	Room	Date built	Seats	Resident organizations
Alberta	Calgary	Arts Commons	Jack Singer Concert Hall	1985	1,800	Calgary Philharmonic Orchestra
Alberta	Calgary	Arts Commons	Max Bell Centre	1985	750	Theatre Calgary
Alberta	Calgary	Arts Commons	Martha Cohen Theatre	1985	418	Alberta Theatre Projects
Alberta	Calgary	Arts Commons	Big Secret Theatre	–	190	One Yellow Rabbit
Alberta	Calgary	Arts Commons	Engineered Air Theatre	1994	185	
Alberta	Calgary	Mount Royal University	Leacock Theatre		310	
Alberta	Calgary	Mount Royal University	Bella Concert Hall	2015	769	Mount Royal Conservatory
Alberta	Calgary	Southern Alberta Jubilee Auditorium		1955	2,538	Calgary Opera, Alberta Ballet
Alberta	Calgary	National Music Centre	Performance Hall	2016	300	
Alberta	Calgary	University of Calgary	MacEwan Hall Ballrooom		1,000	
Alberta	Calgary	University of Calgary	Rozsa Centre	1997	384	
Alberta	Edmonton	Citadel Theatre	Lee Pavilion	1965	20	
Alberta	Edmonton	Citadel Theatre	The Club at Citadel	1965	150	
Alberta	Edmonton	Citadel Theatre	MacLab Theatre	1965	705	
Alberta	Edmonton	Citadel Theatre	Shoctor Theatre	1965	651	
Alberta	Edmonton	Citadel Theatre	Tucker Amphitheatre	1965	90	
Alberta	Edmonton	Citadel Theatre	Zeidler Hall	1965	215	
Alberta	Edmonton	Francis Winspear Centre for Music		1997	1,932	Edmonton Symphony Orchestra
Alberta	Edmonton	Northern Alberta Jubilee Auditorium		1955	2,538	Edmonton Opera, Alberta Ballet
Alberta	Edmonton	University of Alberta	Convocation Hall	1915	426	
Alberta	Edmonton	University of Alberta	Meyer Horowitz Theatre	1967	720	
Alberta	Banff	Banff Centre for Arts and Creativity	Eric Harvey Theatre	1967	638	
Alberta	Lethbridge	Yates Theatre	–	1965	500	
Alberta	Medicine Hat	The Esplanade	–	2005	700	
Alberta	Rosebud	Rosebud Opera House	–	1985	220	Rosebud Theatre
British Columbia	Coquitlam	The Molson Canadian Theatre		2006	1,074	
British Columbia	Kamloops	Western Canada Theatre		1975	706	
British Columbia	Kelowna	Kelowna Community Theatre		1967	853	Okanagan Symphony Orchestra
British Columbia	Kelowna	Rotary Centre for the Arts	Mary Irwin Theatre		326	
British Columbia	Nanaimo	Port Theatre		1989	800	Vancouver Island Symphony Orchestra
British Columbia	Surrey	Bell Performing Arts Centre		2001	1,100	
British Columbia	Vancouver	University of British Columbia, Chan Centre for the Performing Arts	Chan Shun Concert Hall	1997	1,265	
British Columbia	Vancouver	The Orpheum		1977	2,790	Vancouver Symphony Orchestra
British Columbia	Vancouver	The Vogue Theatre		1941	1,280	
British Columbia	Vancouver	Queen Elizabeth Theatre		1959	2,765	Vancouver Opera
British Columbia	Vancouver	Vancouver Playhouse		1962	668	
British Columbia	Vancouver	Rio Theatre		1938	420	
British Columbia	Victoria	University of Victoria	Farquhar Auditorium	1978	1,229	
British Columbia	Victoria	University of Victoria	David Lam Auditorium	1978	323	
British Columbia	Victoria	University of Victoria	Philip T. Young Recital Hall	1978	200	
British Columbia	Victoria	Royal Theatre		1914	1,415	Pacific Opera, Victoria Symphony
British Columbia	Victoria	Alix Goolden Hall		1890	800	Victoria Conservatory of Music
British Columbia	Victoria	McPherson Playhouse		1914	772	
Manitoba	Winnipeg	Manitoba Centennial Centre	Centennial Concert Hall	1968	2,305	Winnipeg Symphony Orchestra, Manitoba Opera, Royal Winnipeg Ballet
Manitoba	Winnipeg	Pantages Playhouse Theatre		1913	1,475	
Manitoba	Winnipeg	Royal Manitoba Theatre Centre		1958	789	
Manitoba	Winnipeg	Burton Cummings Theatre		1907	1,638	
Manitoba	Brandon	Western Manitoba Centennial Auditorium		1967	800	
New Brunswick	Sackville	Mount Allison University	Convocation Hall	1966	1,500	
New Brunswick	Fredericton	The Playhouse		1964	709	
New Brunswick	Moncton	Capitol Theatre		1920	800	Symphony New Brunswick
New Brunswick	Saint John	Imperial Theatre		1913	852	
Newfoundland and Labrador	St. John's	Arts and Culture Centre		1967	990	Newfoundland Symphony Orchestra
Newfoundland and Labrador	St. John's	LSPU Hall			190	
Newfoundland and Labrador	St. John's	Memorial University of Newfoundland	Reid Theatre	1961	500	
Newfoundland and Labrador	Gander	Joseph R Smallwood Arts & Culture Centre		1971	400	
Newfoundland and Labrador	Corner Brook	Arts and Culture Centre		1967	400	
Newfoundland and Labrador	Grand Falls	Gordon Pinsent Centre for the Arts		1967	500	
Nova Scotia	Halifax	Dalhousie Arts Centre	Rebecca Cohn Auditorium	1971	1,023	Symphony Nova Scotia
Nova Scotia	Halifax	Dalhousie Arts Centre	Joseph Strug Concert Hall	2023	300	
Nova Scotia	Halifax	Neptune Theatre		1915	479	
Nova Scotia	Sydney	Highland Arts Theatre		2013	400	
Ontario	Brantford	The Sanderson Centre		1919	1,125	
Ontario	Brampton	Rose Theatre		2006	880	
Ontario	Hamilton	FirstOntario Concert Hall		1973	2,193	Hamilton Philharmonic Orchestra
Ontario	Hamilton	Theatre Aquarius	Irving Zucker Auditorium		700	Hamilton Opera
Ontario	Kingston	The Grand Theatre		1902	775	
Ontario	Kingston	Isabel Bader Centre for the Performing Arts	Performance Hall	2007	566	
Ontario	Kitchener	Centre In The Square	Raffi Armenian Theatre	1980	2,047	Kitchener-Waterloo Symphony, Grand Philharmonic Choir, Kitchener Waterloo Musical Productions
Ontario	London	Centennial Hall		1967	1,250	Orchestra London Canada
Ontario	London	University of Western Ontario Faculty of Music	Paul Davenport Theatre		400	
Ontario	London	University of Western Ontario Faculty of Music	von Kuster Hall		248	
Ontario	London	University of Western Ontario Faculty of Music	Studio 242	2015	48	
Ontario	Mississauga	Living Arts Centre	Hammerson Hall	1997	1,315	Mississauga Symphony Orchestra
Ontario	North Bay	Capitol Centre Theatre		1927	932	North Bay Symphony Orchestra
Ontario	Ottawa	National Arts Centre	Southam Hall	1965	2,065	National Arts Centre Orchestra, Ottawa Symphony Orchestra, Opera Lyra Ottawa
Ontario	Ottawa	National Arts Centre	Babs Asper Theatre	1965	897	
Ontario	Richmond Hill	Richmond Hill Centre for the Performing Arts		2009	631	
Ontario	St. Catharines	FirstOntario Performing Arts Centre	Partridge Hall	2015	782	Niagara Symphony Orchestra
Ontario	St. Catharines	FirstOntario Performing Arts Centre	Cairns Recital Hall	2015	304	
Ontario	Sudbury	Fraser Building-Laurentian University	Fraser Auditorium		669	Sudbury Symphony Orchestra
Ontario	Thunder Bay	Thunder Bay Community Auditorium		1985	1,497	Thunder Bay Symphony Orchestra
Ontario	Toronto	Canadian Broadcasting Centre	Glenn Gould Studio	1993	341	
Ontario	Toronto	Danforth Music Hall		1919	1,427	
Ontario	Toronto	Four Seasons Centre for the Performing Arts	R. Fraser Elliott Hall	2006	2,071	Canadian Opera Company
Ontario	Toronto	History		2021	2,500	
Ontario	Toronto	Masonic Temple (The Concert Hall)		1918	1,200	
Ontario	Toronto	Massey Hall		1894	2,752	
Ontario	Toronto	Meridian Arts Centre	George Weston Recital Hall	1993	1,036	Toronto Philharmonia
Ontario	Toronto	Meridian Hall		1960	3,191	
Ontario	Toronto	The Opera House		1905	950	
Ontario	Toronto	Queen Elizabeth Theatre		1957	1,264	
Ontario	Toronto	Roy Thomson Hall		1982	2,630	Toronto Symphony Orchestra
Ontario	Toronto	The Royal Conservatory of Music	Koerner Hall	2009	1,140	
Ontario	Toronto	The Royal Conservatory of Music	Mazzoleni Hall	1901	237	
Ontario	Toronto	University of Toronto Faculty of Music	MacMillan Theatre	1963	815	
Ontario	Toronto	University of Toronto Faculty of Music	Walter Hall	1962	490	
Ontario	Toronto	York University Accolade East	Tribute Communities Recital Hall	2006	327	
Windsor	St. Clair Centre for the Arts	Chrysler Theatre	1961	1,200	Windsor Symphony Orchestra	
Prince Edward Island	Charlottetown	Confederation Centre of the Arts		1964	1,109	
Quebec	Laval	Salle André-Mathieu		1979	825	Orchestre Symphonique de Laval
Quebec	Longueuil	Theatre de la Ville	Pratt and Whitney Room	1979	911	Orchestre Symphonique de Longueuil
Quebec	Montreal	Studio TD (formerly L'Astral)		2009	600	Montréal International Jazz Festival
Quebec	Montreal	Place des Arts	Montreal Symphony House	2011	1,900	Montreal Symphony Orchestra
Quebec	Montreal	Place des Arts	Salle Wilfrid-Pelletier	1963	2,900	Opéra de Montréal, Montreal Symphony Orchestra (until 2011), Les Grands Ballets Canadiens
Quebec	Montreal	McGill University	Pollack Hall	1973	600	
Quebec	Montreal	Jean-Deslauriers Theatre		1930	1,307	
Quebec	Montreal	Monument-National		1894	1,620	
Quebec	Montreal	Théâtre Maisonneuve		1967	1,453	
Quebec	Montreal	Montreal Museum of Fine Arts; Pavillon Claire et Marc Bourgie	Salle Bourgie	1894 & 2011	444	
Quebec	Montreal	Université de Montréal	Salle Claude-Champagne	1962	1,000	
Quebec	Montreal	Université du Québec à Montréal	Salle-Pierre-Mercure	1992	845	
Quebec	Quebec City	Grand Théâtre de Québec	Salle Louis-Fréchette	1971	1,875	Orchestre Symphonique de Québec
Quebec	Quebec City	Palais Montcalm	Salle Raoul-Jobin	1932	979	Violons du Roy
Quebec	Saguenay	Théâtre du Saguenay	Dufour Auditorium	1973	970	
Quebec	Sherbrooke	Granada Theatre		1929	1,200	Orchestre Symphonique de Sherbrooke
Quebec	Trois-Rivières	Salle J.-Antonio-Thompson		1927	1,045	Orchestre Symphonique de Trois-Rivières
Saskatchewan	Regina	Conexus Arts Centre		1970	2,031	Regina Symphony Orchestra
Saskatchewan	Regina	Darke Hall		1928	610	
Saskatchewan	Saskatoon	TCU Place		1968	2,003	Saskatoon Symphony Orchestra
Saskatchewan	Saskatoon	Persephone Theatre		2007	500	Saskatoon Opera
Saskatchewan	Prince Albert	E A Rawlinson Centre For The Arts		2003	600	
Saskatchewan	Moose Jaw	Mae Wilson Theatre		1916	420	

=== Dominican Republic ===
Location	Venue	Room	Date built	Seats	Resident organizations
Santo Domingo	Teatro Nacional	Sala Eduardo Brito (Eduardo Brito Hall)	1973	1,589	National Symphony Orchestra (Dominican Republic)

=== Mexico ===
Location	Venue	Room	Date built	Seats	Resident organizations
Acapulco	Forum de Mundo Imperial		2008	4,000	
Aguascalientes	Teatro Aguascalientes		1969	1,650	Orquesta Sinfónica de Aguascaliente
Cabo San Lucas	Pabellón Cultural de la República		2010	600	
Cancún	Auditorio del Centro de Convenciones		1993	600	
Chihuahua	Foro Antelia		2016	3,000	
Colima	Auditorio Paraninfo Universitario		2008	648	
Durango	Aula Magna CCB		2012	3,000	
Ensenada	Auditorio Central		2016	1,000	
Guadalajara	Diana Theatre		2005	2,345	
Guadalajara	Teatro Degollado		1866	1,015	Orquesta Filarmónica de Jalisco, Ballet Folclórico de la Universidad de Guadalajara, Ballet del Ayuntamiento de Guadalajara
Guadalajara	Telmex Auditorium		2003	8,712	
Guanajuato	Auditorio del Centro de Convenciones		1991	1,862	
Guasave	Auditorio Héroes de Sinaloa		1986	1,075	
Guaymas	Auditorio Fray Ivo Toneck		1973	1,004	
Hermosillo	Auditorio Cívico del Estado		1967	2,558	
Matamoros	Auditorio Parque Olímpico		2013	1,800	
Mexico City	Auditorio Nacional		1952	10,000	
Mexico City	El Plaza Condesa		2011	1,600	Pop/rock music
Mexico City	Teatro Metropólitan		1943	3,165	Pop/rock music
Mexico City	Teatro de la Ciudad de México		1925	1,344	
Mexico City	Palacio de Bellas Artes		1934	1,977	National Symphony Orchestra, Compañia Nacional de Danza, Opera de Bellas Artes, Orquesta de Cámara de Bellas Artes
Mexico City	Pepsi Center WTC		2012	3,342	Mexico City Philharmonic Orchestra
Mexico City	Sala Nezahualcóyotl		1976	2,229	Orquesta Filarmónica de la UNAM
Mérida	Auditorio La Isla		2019	3,100	
Monterrey	Auditorio Citibanamex		1994	8,200	
Monterrey	Auditorio Luis Elizondo		1980	1,838	
Monterrey	Teatro de la Ciudad		1984	1,417	
Morelia	Poliforum de Morelia		2013	600	
Puebla	Auditorio de la Reforma		1962	1,815	
Puebla	Auditorio Siglo XXI		2005	5,634	
Puerto Vallarta	Auditorio Juan Luis Cifuentes Lemus		2005	643	
Querétaro	Centro de Congresos Querétaro	Gran Salon Queretaro	2009	6,000	
Querétaro	Centro de Congresos Querétaro	Casa de los Corregidores	2007	2,800	
Querétaro	Centro de Congresos Querétaro	Teatro Metropolitano	2007	1,335	Orquesta Filarmónica de Querétaro
San Luis Potosí	Auditorio del Centro Cultural Universitario Bicentenario		2010	1,360	
Tijuana	Sala de Espectáculos		1985	1,000	Orquesta de Baja California
Toluca	Sala de Conciertos Elisa Carrillo		2011	1,200	Orquesta Filarmónica Mexiquense
Toluca	Teatro Morelos		1969	2,600	
Torreón	Auditorio Municipal		1972	2,500	
Xalapa	Auditorio Salvador Díaz Mirón		2017	1,885	
Zacatecas	Palacio de Convenciones		2009	5,000	

=== Puerto Rico ===
Location	Venue	Room	Date built	Seats	Resident organizations
San Juan	Centro de Bellas Artes	Sala Antonio Paoli	1981	1,945	
San Juan	Centro de Bellas Artes	Sala Sinfónica Pablo Casals	1981	1,300	Puerto Rico Symphony Orchestra
San Juan	Centro de Bellas Artes	Sala René Marquéz	1981	781	
San Juan	Centro de Bellas Artes	Sala Carlos Marichal	1981	210	
San Juan	Centro de Bellas Artes	Café Teatro Sylvia Rexach	1981	200	

=== Trinidad and Tobago ===
Location	Venue	Room	Date built	Seats	Resident organizations
Port of Spain	National Academy of the Performing Arts, North		2009	1,500	
San Fernando	National Academy of the Performing Arts, South		2012	TBA	
San Fernando	Naparima Bowl		1962	500	
Scarborough	Shaw Park Complex	Main stage	2015	5,000	Tobago Symphonic Orchestra

=== United States ===
==== Alabama–California ====
State	Location	Venue	Room	Date built	Seats	Resident organizations
Alabama	Albertville	Sand Mountain Amphitheatre		2022	5,000	
Alabama	Bessemer	Bessemer Civic Center			1,200	
Alabama	Birmingham	Iron City		1929	1,300	
Alabama	Birmingham	Jemison Concert Hall		1996	1,330	
Alabama	Birmingham	Birmingham–Jefferson Convention Complex	Concert Hall	1976	2,835	Alabama Symphony Orchestra
Alabama	Birmingham	Alys Robinson Stephens Performing Arts Center	Jemison Concert Hall	1996	1,346	Alabama Symphony Orchestra
Alabama	Birmingham	Alabama Theatre		1927	2,176	
Alabama	Birmingham	Boutwell Memorial Auditorium		1924	5,000	
Alabama	Birmingham	Bartow Arena		1988	9,000	
Alabama	Birmingham	Protective Stadium		2021	45,000	
Alabama	Birmingham	Legion Field		1927	71,594	
Alabama	Daphne	Daphne Civic Center		1999	1,700 (General Admission) 1,450 (Seated)	
Alabama	Dothan	Wells Fargo Arena (Dothan, Alabama)		2004	3,317	
Alabama	Dothan	AllMetal Amphitheater		1999	12,400	
Alabama	Dothan	Dothan Civic Center		1975	3,100	
Alabama	Florence	The Shoals Theatre		1948	1,166	
Alabama	Florence	Norton Auditorium At University of North Alabama		1969	1,500	
Alabama	Florence	Florence Coliseum		1953	3,000	
Alabama	Gadsden	Mort Glasser Amphitheatre		1935	1,500	
Alabama	Gadsden	Venue at Coosa Landing		2023	1,092	
Alabama	Homewood	Wright Center At Samford University		1976	2,500	
Alabama	Homewood	Pete Hanna Center		2007	6,000	
Alabama	Huntsville	Von Braun Center	Propst Arena	1975	9,000	
Alabama	Huntsville	Von Braun Center	Mark C. Smith Concert Hall	1975	2,153	Huntsville Symphony Orchestra
Alabama	Huntsville	Orion Amphitheatre		2022	8,000	
Alabama	Mobile	Saenger Theatre		1927	1,921	Mobile Symphony Orchestra
Alabama	Mobile	Mobile Civic Center	Arena	1964	10,112	
Alabama	Mobile	Mobile Civic Center	Expo Hall	1964	3,000	
Alabama	Mobile	Mobile Civic Center	Theater	1964	1,940	
Alabama	Mobile	Ladd–Peebles Stadium		1948	40,000	
Alabama	Mobile	Mitchell Center	Arena-Full House	1999	10,041	
Alabama	Mobile	Mitchell Center	Arena-Front Ofstage	1999	7,354	
Alabama	Mobile	Mitchell Center	Theater	1999	2,800	
Alabama	Montgomery	Garrett Coliseum		1953	12,500	
Alabama	Montgomery	Dunn–Oliver Acadome		1992	8,300	
Alabama	Montgomery	Montgomery Performing Arts Center			1,800	
Alabama	Montgomery	Davis Theater for the Performing Arts		1930	1,200	
Alabama	Montgomery	Cramton Bowl		1922	35,000	
Alabama	Montgomery	Riverwalk Amphitheater			6,000	
Alabama	Orange Beach	The Wharf Amphitheater		2006	10,000	
Alabama	Oxford	Oxford Performing Arts Center		2013	1,200	
Alabama	Ozark	Ozark Civic Center		1975	3,600	
Alabama	Pelham	Oak Mountain Amphitheatre		1986	10,500	
Alabama	Priceville	Celebration Arena			7,000	
Alabama	Robertsdale	Baldwin County Coliseum			5,000	
Alabama	Rainsville	Northeast Alabama Agri-Business Center		2010	5,030	
Alabama	Tuscaloosa	The University of Alabama School of Music	Frank M. Moody Concert Hall	1987	1,000	The University of Alabama Huxford Symphony Orchestra, Tuscaloosa Symphony Orchestra
Alabama	Tuscaloosa	Tuscaloosa Amphitheater		2011	7,470	
Alabama	Tuscaloosa	Bama Theatre		1938	713	
Alabama	Tuscaloosa	Coleman Coliseum		1968	16,250	
Alaska	Anchorage	Alaska Center for the Performing Arts	Atwood Concert Hall	1989	2,000	Anchorage Symphony Orchestra
Alaska	Anchorage	Alaska Center for the Performing Arts	Discovery Theatre	1989	800	Anchorage Opera
Arizona	Mesa	Mesa Arts Center	Ikeda Theater	2005	1,588	
Arizona	Phoenix	Arizona Financial Theatre		2002	5,000	
Arizona	Phoenix	Orpheum Theatre	Jewell and Delbert Hall	1929	1,364	
Arizona	Phoenix	Phoenix Symphony Hall		1972	2,387	Phoenix Symphony, Ballet Arizona, Arizona Opera
Arizona	Tempe	Grady Gammage Memorial Auditorium		1964	3,017	Broadway Across America – Arizona; Gammage Beyond; ASU Gammage Presents; ASU Gammage Welcomes
Arizona	Tempe	Tempe Center for the Arts	Theater; Studio	2007	600; 200	
Arizona	Tucson	Tucson Convention Center	Linda Ronstadt Music Hall	1971	2,289	Arizona Opera, Tucson Symphony Orchestra
Arizona	Tucson	University of Arizona	Centennial Hall	1936	2400	
Arizona	Wickenburg	Del E. Webb Center for the Performing Arts		2000	587	
Arkansas	Fayetteville	Walton Arts Center	Baum Walker Hall	1992	1,201	
Arkansas	Fort Smith	Fort Smith Convention Center	ArcBest Performing Arts Center	1981	1,331	
Arkansas	Little Rock	Robinson Center	Music Hall	1939	2,609	Arkansas Symphony Orchestra
Arkansas	Little Rock	University of Arkansas at Little Rock	Stella Boyle Smith Concert Hall	1977	312	
California	Anaheim	City National Grove of Anaheim		1998	1,700	
California	Anaheim	Hyperion Theater			1,984	Disney California Adventure
California	Anaheim	House of Blues Anaheim		2017	2,200	
California	Anaheim	Honda Center		1993	19,578 (Full house) 10,935 (Amphitheater)	
California	Anaheim	Angel Stadium		1966	45,050	
California	Anaheim	Anaheim Convention Center Arena		1966	7,500	
California	Arroyo Grande	The Clark Center for the Performing Arts	Forbes Hall	2003	617	
California	Bakersfield	Fox Theater		1930	1,500	
California	Bakersfield	Mechanics Bank Theater		1962	3,000	
California	Bakersfield	Spectrum Amphitheatre At The Park at River Walk		2007	4,000	
California	Bakersfield	Mechanics Bank Arena		1998	10,400	
California	Bakersfield	Icardo Center			3,500	
California	Berkeley	Greek Theatre (Berkeley)		1903	8,500	
California	Beverly Hills	Saban Theatre		1930	2,000	
California	Carmel-by-the-Sea	Sunset Center	Concert Hall	1931	718	Carmel Bach Festival, Monterey Symphony, Carmel Music Society, Chamber Music Monterey Bay
California	Carson	Dignity Health Sports Park		2003	27,000	
California	Cerritos	Cerritos Center for the Performing Arts	Concert Hall	1993	1,934	
California	Chico	Laxson Auditorium		1931	1,200	
California	Chula Vista	North Island Credit Union Amphitheatre		1998	20,500	
California	City Of Industry	Industry Hills Expo Center		1981	5,000	
California	Claremont	Bridges Hall of Music		1915	550	Pomona College Orchestra
California	Conford	Concord Pavilion		1975	12,500	
California	Costa Mesa	Segerstrom Center for the Arts	Segerstrom Hall	1986	2,936	
California	Costa Mesa	Segerstrom Center for the Arts	Renee and Henry Segerstrom Concert Hall	2006	2,000	Pacific Symphony, The Pacific Chorale, Philharmonic Society of Orange County
California	Costa Mesa	Pacific Amphitheatre		1983	8,042	
California	Davis	Mondavi Center	Jackson Concert Hall	2002	1,800	University of California, Davis Symphony Orchestra
California	Daly City	Cow Palace		1941	16,500	
California	Escondido	California Center for the Arts, Escondido	Concert Hall	1994	1,523	
California	Eureka	Arkley Center for the Performing Arts	Concert Hall	1920	750	Eureka Symphony Orchestra, North Coast Dance
California	Fresno	Azteca Theater (Fresno, California)		1948	760	
California	Fullerton	California State University, Fullerton	Meng Hall	2006	808	
California	Glendale	Alex Theatre		1925	1,381	Los Angeles Chamber Orchestra, Glendale Symphony Orchestra
California	Inglewood	YouTube Theater		2021	6,000	
California	Inglewood	Kia Forum		1967	17,505	
California	Inglewood	SoFi Stadium		2020	70,240	
California	Irvine	Bren Events Center		1987	5,430	
California	Long Beach	California State University, Long Beach	Carpenter Performing Arts Center	1994	1,074	
California	Long Beach	Long Beach Convention and Entertainment Center	Terrace Theater	1978	3,051	Long Beach Symphony Orchestra
California	Los Angeles	Greek Theatre (Los Angeles)		1930	5,900	
California	Los Angeles	BMO Stadium		2018	22,000	
California	Los Angeles	Los Angeles Music Center	Dorothy Chandler Pavilion	1964	3,197	Los Angeles Opera, Music Center Dance
California	Los Angeles	Los Angeles Music Center	Walt Disney Concert Hall	2003	2,265	Los Angeles Philharmonic, Los Angeles Master Chorale
California	Los Angeles	The Echo (venue)		2001	350	
California	Los Angeles	Colburn School of Music	Zipper Hall	1998	415	Monday Evening Concerts, Southwest Chamber Music, Los Angeles Chamber Orchestra, Musica Angelica
California	Los Angeles	California State University, Northridge	Valley Performing Arts Center	2011	1,700	
California	Los Angeles	Microsoft Theater		2007	7,100	
California	Los Angeles	Crypto.com Arena		1999	20,000	
California	Los Angeles	UCLA	Royce Hall	1929	1,834	Los Angeles Chamber Orchestra
California	Los Angeles	Saban Media Center		2015-16	595	The Television Academy Of Los Angeles
California	Los Angeles	The Fonda Theatre		1926	1,200	
California	Los Angeles	Dolby Theatre		2001	3,400	
California	Los Angeles	Hollywood Pantages Theatre		1930	2,703	
California	Los Angeles	Hollywood Bowl		1922	17,500	
California	Los Angeles	University of Southern California (USC)	Bovard Auditorium	1921	1,220	
California	Los Angeles	University of Southern California (USC)	Alfred Newman Recital Hall (fka Allan Hancock Auditorium)	1940	286	
California	Los Angeles	El Rey Theatre (Los Angeles)		1936	771	
California	Los Angeles	Hollywood Palladium		1940	4,000	
California	Mountain View	Shoreline Amphitheatre		1986	22,500	
California	Napa	Napa Valley Opera House		1879		
California	Napa	Uptown Theater		1937	863	
California	Ontario	Toyota Arena		2008	11,089	
California	Pasadena	Ambassador Auditorium		1974	1,262	Pasadena Symphony
California	Pasadena	Pasadena Conference Center	Pasadena Civic Auditorium	1931	3,029	People's Choice Awards
California	Palm Springs	Plaza Theatre (Palm Springs, California)		1936	800	
California	Rancho Cucamonga	Victoria Gardens Cultural Center		2006	250+	
California	Sacramento	Crest Theatre		1912	975	
California	Sacramento	SAFE Credit Union Convention Center	SAFE Credit Union Performing Arts Center		2,442	
California	Sacramento	B Street Theatre		1986	359	
California	Sacramento	Broadway Sacramento		1951	2,400 (Community Center Theater)	
California	San Diego	Jacobs Music Center		1929	2,252	San Diego Symphony
California	San Diego	The Casbah (music venue)		1989	200+	
California	San Diego	University of California, San Diego	Mandeville Auditorium	1975	787	La Jolla Symphony and Chorus
California	San Diego	University of California, San Diego	Conrad Prebys Music Center	2009	380	
California	San Francisco	Golden Gate Theatre		1922	2,297	
California	San Francisco	Orpheum Theatre		1912	2,203	
California	San Francisco	The Fillmore		1912	1,315	
California	San Francisco	San Francisco War Memorial and Performing Arts Center	Louise M. Davies Symphony Hall	1980	2,743	San Francisco Symphony
California	San Francisco	San Francisco War Memorial and Performing Arts Center	War Memorial Opera House	1932	3,146	San Francisco Opera, San Francisco Ballet
California	San Francisco	San Francisco War Memorial and Performing Arts Center	Herbst Theatre	1932	916	American Conservatory Theater
California	San Francisco	SF Masonic Auditorium		1958	3,481	
California	San Francisco	Castro Theatre		1922	1,407	
California	San Francisco	Great American Music Hall		1907	470	
California	San Jose	San Jose Civic	Concert Hall	1936	3,001	
California	San Jose	SAP Center		1993	17,562	
California	San Jose	Opera San José	California Theatre	1927	1,134	Opera San Jose, Symphony San Jose
California	San Jose	San Jose Center for the Performing Arts	Concert Hall	1973	2,691	Ballet San Jose, Symphony San Jose, Broadway San Jose, American Musical Theatre of San Jose
California	San Luis Obispo	Performing Arts Center	Harold Miossi Hall (formerly Harman Hall)	1996	1,289	San Luis Obispo Symphony
California	San Luis Obispo	Fremont Theater		1942	850	
California	Santa Barbara	Arlington Center for the Performing Arts	Arlington Theater	1931	2,018	Community Arts Music Association (CAMA) of Santa Barbara
California	Santa Barbara	Granada Theatre		1924	1,550	Santa Barbara Symphony Orchestra, Community Arts Music Association (CAMA) of Santa Barbara
California	Santa Barbara	Lobero Theatre		1873	680	Community Arts Music Association (CAMA) of Santa Barbara, Santa Barbara Chamber Orchestra
California	Santa Barbara	Santa Barbara Bowl		1936	4,500	
California	Santa Cruz	Santa Cruz Civic Auditorium		1940	2,021	Santa Cruz County Symphony
California	Santa Paula	Ebell Club of Santa Paula	Santa Paula Theatre Center	1917	90+	
California	Santa Rosa	Luther Burbank Center for the Arts	Ruth Finley Person Theater	1981	1,612	Ballet California, and the Redwood Empire Lyric Theater
California	Santa Rosa	Green Music Center	Weill Hall	2012	1,400	Santa Rosa Symphony
California	Stockton	University of the Pacific	Faye Spanos Concert Hall	1927	872	
California	Thousand Oaks	Thousand Oaks Civic Arts Plaza	Fred Kavli Theatre for the Performing Arts	1994	1,800	Cabrillo Music Theatre, New West Symphony, and the Pacific Festival Ballet
California	Thousand Oaks	Thousand Oaks Civic Arts Plaza	Janet & Ray Scherr Forum Theatre	1994	394	Cabrillo Music Theatre, New West Symphony, and the Pacific Festival Ballet
California	Vallejo	Empress Theatre (California)		1911	300	
California	Ventura	Ventura Theatre		1928	1,200	
California	Visalia	Fox Theatre (Visalia, California)		1930	1,275	
California	West Hollywood	Troubadour (West Hollywood, California)		1957	500	
California	West Hollywood	Roxy Theatre (West Hollywood)		1973	500	
California	Wheatland	Toyota Amphitheatre		2000	18,500	
California	Woodland	Woodland Opera House			446	
California	Yountville	Lincoln Theater		1957	1,200	Napa Valley Symphony, Napa Regional Dance Company

==== Colorado–District of Columbia ====
State	Location	Venue	Room	Date built	Seats	Resident organizations
Colorado	Aspen	Michael Klein Music Tent and Harris Concert Hall		1993/2000	2050/500	Aspen Music Festival and School
Colorado	Boulder	University of Colorado at Boulder	Macky Auditorium	1910	2,052	Boulder Philharmonic Orchestra
Colorado	Colorado Springs	Pikes Peak Center	El Pomar Great Hall	1982	2,000	Colorado Springs Philharmonic
Colorado	Denver	Denver Performing Arts Complex	Boettcher Concert Hall	1978	2,634	Colorado Symphony Orchestra
Colorado	Durango	Fort Lewis College	Community Concert Hall at Fort Lewis College	1997	600	San Juan Symphony
Colorado	Golden	Colorado School of Mines	Bunker Auditorium at Cecil H. And Ida Green Center	1972	1,300	Jefferson Symphony Orchestra
Colorado	Greeley	Union Colony Civic Center	Monfort Concert Hall	1988	1,686	Greeley Philharmonic Orchestra
Connecticut	Fairfield	Regina A. Quick Center for the Arts	Kelley Theater	1990	740	Fairfield University Orchestra
Connecticut	Hartford	The Bushnell Center for the Performing Arts	Mortensen Hall	1930	2,799	Hartford Symphony Orchestra
Connecticut	New Haven	Yale University	Woolsey Hall	1901	2,695	New Haven Symphony Orchestra, Yale Symphony Orchestra
Connecticut	Stamford	Stamford Center for the Arts	Palace Theater	1983	1,580	Stamford Symphony Orchestra
Delaware	Wilmington	Grand Opera House	Concert Hall	1871	1,208	Delaware Symphony Orchestra, OperaDelaware
District of Columbia	Washington, D.C.	DAR Constitution Hall	Concert Hall	1929	3,702	
District of Columbia	Washington, D.C.	John F. Kennedy Center for the Performing Arts	Concert Hall	1971	2,442	National Symphony Orchestra
District of Columbia	Washington, D.C.	John F. Kennedy Center for the Performing Arts	Opera House	1971	2,300	Washington National Opera
District of Columbia	Washington, D.C.	John F. Kennedy Center for the Performing Arts	Terrace Theater	late 1970s	513	
District of Columbia	Washington, D.C.	Library of Congress/Jefferson Building	Elizabeth Sprague Coolidge Auditorium	1925	500	
District of Columbia	Washington, D.C.	National Academy of Sciences	Auditorium	1969	670	
District of Columbia	Washington, D.C.	National Museum of Natural History	Baird Auditorium	1910	565	

==== Florida ====
Location	Venue	Room	Date built	Seats	Resident organizations
Clearwater	Richard B. Baumgardner Center for the Performing Arts	Ruth Eckerd Hall	1983	2,180	The Florida Orchestra
Coral Gables	Maurice Gusman Concert Hall	Gusman Concert Hall	1975	600	University of Miami
Davie	Rose and Alfred Miniaci Performing Arts Center		2007	500	
Fort Lauderdale	Broward Center for the Performing Arts	Au-rene Theater	1991	2,688	
Fort Lauderdale	Broward Center for the Performing Arts	Amaturo Theater	1991	582	
Gainesville	University Auditorium	University of Florida Auditorium	1924	843	University of Florida
Gainesville	Curtis M. Phillips Center for the Performing Arts	Phillips Center for the Performing Arts	1992	1,900	University of Florida
Jacksonville	Times-Union Center for the Performing Arts	Moran Theater	1997	2,979	
Jacksonville	Times-Union Center for the Performing Arts	Jacoby Symphony Hall	1997	1,800	Jacksonville Symphony, Jacksonville Symphony Youth Orchestra
Jacksonville	Times-Union Center for the Performing Arts	Terry Theater	1997	600	
Miami	Adrienne Arsht Center for the Performing Arts	Knight Concert Hall	2006	2,200	New World Symphony
Miami	Adrienne Arsht Center for the Performing Arts	Ziff Ballet Opera House	2006	2,400	
Miami	Knight Center Complex	James L. Knight Center Theater	1982	4,569	
Orlando	Bob Carr Theater		1926, 1977	2,518	Orlando Opera, Florida Symphony Youth Orchestra, Florida Symphony Orchestra
Orlando	Dr. Phillips Center for the Performing Arts	Walt Disney Theater	2014	2,731	Orlando Ballet, Orlando Philharmonic Orchestra, Broadway in Orlando, Opera Orlando
Orlando	Dr. Phillips Center for the Performing Arts	Alexis & Jim Pugh Theater	2014	294	Orlando Ballet, Orlando Philharmonic Orchestra, Broadway in Orlando, Opera Orlando
Orlando	Dr. Phillips Center for the Performing Arts	Steinmetz Hall	2022	1,700	Orlando Ballet, Orlando Philharmonic Orchestra, Broadway in Orlando, Opera Orlando
St. Petersburg	Duke Energy Center for the Arts – Mahaffey Theater	Mahaffey Theater	1965	2,031	The Florida Orchestra
Tallahassee	Florida State University College of Music	Ruby Diamond Auditorium	2010	1,172	Florida State University
Tallahassee	Donald L. Tucker Civic Center	Concert Venue	1981	12,000	Florida State University
Tallahassee	Donald L. Tucker Civic Center	Center Theatre	1981	6,000	Florida State University
Tampa	The David A. Straz Jr. Center for the Performing Arts	Carol Morsani Hall	1987	2,552	The Florida Orchestra
Tampa	The David A. Straz Jr. Center for the Performing Arts	Ferguson Hall	1987	1,042	
Tampa	The David A. Straz Jr. Center for the Performing Arts	Jaeb Theater	1987	292	
Tampa	Tampa Theatre		1926	1,446	
West Palm Beach	Raymond F. Kravis Center for the Performing Arts	Alexander W. Dreyfoos, Jr. Concert Hall	1992	2,193	

==== Georgia–Hawaii ====
State	Location	Venue	Room	Date built	Seats	Resident organizations
Georgia	Athens	Classic Center		1996	2,122	
Georgia	Athens	Georgia Theatre		1935	800	
Georgia	Augusta	Miller Theater	Brian J. Marks Hall	1940	1,300	
Georgia	Atlanta	7 Stages Theatre	Main Stage	1940	200	
Georgia	Atlanta	7 Stages Theatre	Black Box	1940	90	
Georgia	Atlanta	Balzer Theater at Herren's		1940	200	Theatrical Outfit
Georgia	Atlanta	Buckhead Theatre		1930	1,800	
Georgia	Atlanta	Center Stage Atlanta	Center Stage	1967	1,050	
Georgia	Atlanta	Chastain Park Amphitheater		1942	6,900	
Georgia	Atlanta	Cobb Energy Performing Arts Centre		2007	2,750	The Atlanta Opera, Atlanta Ballet and Atlanta Broadway Series
Georgia	Atlanta	Dad's Garage			210	Dad's Garage Theatre Company
Georgia	Atlanta	Fox Theatre	Auditorium	1929	4,678	
Georgia	Atlanta	Georgia Institute of Technology	Ferst Center for the Arts	1992	1,155	
Georgia	Atlanta	Georgia State University	Rialto Center for the Arts	1916	833	
Georgia	Atlanta	King Plow Arts Center	Actor's Express Theatre	1902	175	Actor's Express Theatre
Georgia	Atlanta	Shakespeare Tavern Playhouse		1990	200	Atlanta Shakespeare Company
Georgia	Atlanta	Synchronicity Theatre		2014	138	
Georgia	Atlanta	The Tabernacle		1911	2,600	
Georgia	Atlanta	Variety Playhouse		1940	1,000	
Georgia	Atlanta	Woodruff Arts Center	Alliance Stage	1968	650	Alliance Theatre
Georgia	Atlanta	Woodruff Arts Center	Atlanta Symphony Hall	1968	1,762	Atlanta Symphony Orchestra
Georgia	Atlanta	Woodruff Arts Center	Rich Theatre	1968	350	
Georgia	Atlanta	Woodruff Arts Center	Hertz Stage	1968	200	
Georgia	Cartersville	Grande Theatre		1910	800	
Georgia	Columbus	RiverCenter for the Performing Arts	Bill Heard Theatre	2002	2,000	
Georgia	Columbus	RiverCenter for the Performing Arts	Legacy Hall	2002	450	
Georgia	Columbus	RiverCenter for the Performing Arts	Studio Theatre	2002	250	
Georgia	Columbus	Springer Opera House	Emily Woodruff Hall	1871	700	
Georgia	Columbus	Columbus Civic Center		1996	10,000	
Georgia	Duluth	Gas South Arena	Performing Arts Center	2003	702	
Georgia	Macon	Douglass Theatre		1911	314	
Georgia	Macon	Grand Opera House		1884	1,030	
Georgia	Marietta	Strand Theatre		1935	531	
Georgia	Morrow	Clayton State University	Spivey Hall	1991	492	
Georgia	Rome	The Desoto Theatre		1929	500	
Georgia	Toccoa	Ritz Theatre		1939	362	
Georgia	Sandy Springs	Sandy Springs Performing Arts Center		2018	1,070	
Georgia	Savannah	Savannah Civic Center	Johnny Mercer Theatre	1974	2,524	
Georgia	Savannah	The Savannah Theatre		1818	525	
Georgia	Smyrna	Coca-Cola Roxy		2017	3,600	
Georgia	Valdosta	Valdosta State University	Whitehead Auditorium	1970	774	Peach State Summer Theatre, Valdosta Symphony Orchestra
Hawaii	Honolulu	Neal S. Blaisdell Center	Concert Hall	1964	2,158	Honolulu Symphony, Hawaii Opera Theater

==== Idaho–Iowa ====
State	Location	Venue	Room	Date built	Seats	Resident organizations
Idaho	Boise	Morrison Center for the Performing Arts	Concert Hall	1984	1,937	
Idaho	Pocatello	L.E. & Thelma E. Stephens Performing Arts Center	Joseph C. and Cheryl H. Jensen Grand Concert Hall	2002	1,200	Idaho State Civic Symphony
Idaho	Rexburg	Eliza R. Snow Performing Arts Center	Barrus Concert Hall	1981	700	Brigham Young University – Idaho Symphony Orchestra BYU Idaho center 15000 seats
Illinois	Bloomington	Braden Auditorium at Illinois State University	Auditorium Theater	1973	3,483	
Illinois	Carbondale	Shryock Auditorium at Southern Illinois University Carbondale	Auditorium	1918	1,200	
Illinois	Chicago	Auditorium Building at Roosevelt University	Auditorium Theater	1889	4,300	
Illinois	Chicago	Chicago Theatre		1921	3,600	
Illinois	Chicago	Civic Opera House	The Ardis Krainik Theatre	1929	3,563	Lyric Opera of Chicago
Illinois	Chicago	Columbia College	Concert Hall		148	
Illinois	Chicago	DePaul University	Concert Hall	1963		
Illinois	Chicago	DePaul University	Recital Hall			
Illinois	Chicago	Millennium Park	Harris Theater for Music and Dance	2003	1,525	Joffrey Ballet, Hubbard Street Dance Chicago, Chicago Opera Theater
Illinois	Chicago	Metro		1927	1,100	
Illinois	Chicago	Symphony Center	Orchestra Hall	1904	2,500	Chicago Symphony Orchestra, Civic Orchestra of Chicago
Illinois	Chicago	University of Chicago	Fulton Recital Hall		150	
Illinois	Chicago	University of Chicago	Mandel Hall	1903	900	
Illinois	Evanston	Northwestern University	Pick-Staiger Concert Hall	1975	1,003	
Illinois	Evanston	Northwestern University	Mary B. Galvin Recital Hall	2015	400	
Illinois	Highland Park	Ravinia Festival	The Pavilion	1950	3,200	Chicago Symphony Orchestra (in summer)
Illinois	Monmouth	Monmouth College	Dahl Auditorium/Chapel	1896	600	Monmouth Orchestra, Monmouth College Chorale, Monmouth College Concert Band
Illinois	Peoria	Peoria Civic Center	Theatre	1982	2,244	Peoria Symphony Orchestra, Peoria Ballet, Peoria Opera
Illinois	Rockford	Coronado Theatre		1927	2,400	
Illinois	Rosemont	Rosemont Theatre		1995	4,400	
Illinois	Springfield	University of Illinois Springfield	Sangamon Auditorium	1981	2,000	
Illinois	Urbana	Krannert Center for the Performing Arts	Foellinger Great Hall	1969	2,078	
Indiana	Anderson	Paramount Theatre		1929		Anderson Symphony
Indiana	Bloomington	Indiana University Jacobs School of Music	Musical Arts Center	1972	1,460	
Indiana	Bloomington	Indiana University Jacobs School of Music	Ione B. Auer Hall	1995	385	
Indiana	Bloomington	Indiana University	Auditorium	1941	3,700	
Indiana	Carmel	The Center for the Performing Arts	The Palladium at the Center for the Performing Arts	2011	1,600	Carmel Symphony Orchestra, Indiana Wind Symphony
Indiana	Carmel	The Center for the Performing Arts	Tarkington Theater	2011	500	
Indiana	Carmel	The Center for the Performing Arts	Studio Theater	2011	200	
Indiana	Evansville	Victory Theatre		1921	1,950	Evansville Philharmonic
Indiana	Fort Wayne	Embassy Theatre		1928	2,471	Fort Wayne Philharmonic Orchestra
Indiana	Fort Wayne	Arts United Center		1973	660	Fort Wayne Ballet, Fort Wayne Civic Theater, Fort Wayne Dance Collective, and Fort Wayne Youtheatre
Indiana	Indianapolis	Hilbert Circle Theatre		1916	1,768	Indianapolis Symphony Orchestra
Indiana	Indianapolis	Butler University	Clowes Memorial Hall	1963	2,172	Butler Ballet, Indianapolis Opera, Broadway Across America, Efroymson Diversity Lecture Series
Indiana	Indianapolis	Old National Centre	Murat Theatre	1909	2,600	
Indiana	Indianapolis	Old National Centre	Egyptian Room	1909	1,800	
Indiana	Indianapolis	Old National Centre	Corinthian Hall	1909	600	
Indiana	Muncie	Ball State University	John R. Emens Auditorium	1964	3,581	Muncie Symphony Orchestra
Indiana	Muncie	Ball State University	Sursa Performance Hall	2004	600	
Indiana	New Albany	Paul W. Ogle Cultural and Community Center	The Richard K. Stem Concert Hall	1995	500	
Indiana	New Albany	Paul W. Ogle Cultural and Community Center	The Recital Hall	1995	96	
Indiana	West Lafayette	Purdue University	Elliott Hall of Music	1940	6,005	
Iowa	Ames	Iowa State Center	C. Y. Stephens Auditorium	1969	2,747	
Iowa	Cedar Rapids	Paramount Theatre		1927	1,693	Orchestra Iowa
Iowa	Davenport	RiverCenter/Adler Theatre	Adler Theatre	1931	2,400	Quad City Symphony Orchestra, Ballet Quad Cities
Iowa	Decorah	Luther College	Center for Faith and Life	1977	1,428	Music Department ensembles
Iowa	Des Moines	Civic Center of Greater Des Moines		1979	2,662	Des Moines Symphony, Ballet Des Moines
Iowa	Des Moines	Hoyt Sherman Place		1923	1,252	
Iowa	Cedar Falls	University of Northern Iowa	Gallagher–Bluedorn Performing Arts Center	2000	1,680	
Iowa	Grinnell	Bucksbaum Center for the Arts	Sebring–Lewis Recital Hall	1999		
Iowa	Iowa City	University of Iowa	Hancher Auditorium	1972	1,800	
Iowa	Mason City	NIACC Performing Arts Center	North Iowa Community Auditorium	1979	1,158	
Iowa	Ottumwa	Bridge View Center	Theater	2007	664	
Iowa	Sioux City	Orpheum Theatre		1927	2,546	Sioux City Symphony Orchestra

==== Kansas–Louisiana ====
State	Location	Venue	Room	Date built	Seats	Resident organizations
Kansas	Wichita	Century II Performing Arts & Convention Center	Concert Hall	1969	2,178	Wichita Symphony Orchestra
Kentucky	Louisville	The Kentucky Center	Whitney Hall	1983	2,406	Louisville Orchestra; Louisville Ballet
Kentucky	Louisville	The Kentucky Center	Moritz von Bomhard Theatre	1983	619	
Kentucky	Louisville	The Kentucky Center	Brown Theatre	1925	1,400	Kentucky Opera
Kentucky	Louisville	The Louisville Palace		1928	2,700	
Kentucky	Louisville	Memorial Auditorium		1928	1,742	
Louisiana	Baton Rouge	LSU Tiger Band Hall	Bert and Sue Turner Tiger Band Rehearsal Hall	2012	325	
Louisiana	Baton Rouge	Raising Cane's River Center	River Center Theater for Performing Arts	1977	1,900	Baton Rouge Symphony Orchestra; Opera Louisiane; Baton Rouge Ballet Theatre
Louisiana	Baton Rouge	Shaw Center for the Arts	Manship Theatre	2005	325	
Louisiana	Lafayette	Heymann Center		1960	2,230	
Louisiana	Lake Charles	Lake Charles Civic Center	Rosa Hart Theater	1972	1,960	
Louisiana	Metairie	Jefferson Performing Arts Center	Ken Hollis Theater	2015	1,500	Jefferson Performing Arts Society
Louisiana	New Orleans	Mahalia Jackson Theater of the Performing Arts		1973	2,100	New Orleans Opera Association; New Orleans Ballet Association
Louisiana	New Orleans	Orpheum Theater		1921	1,780	Louisiana Philharmonic Orchestra
Louisiana	New Orleans	Saenger Theatre		1927	2,800	
Louisiana	Shreveport	RiverView Theater		1965	1,725	Shreveport Symphony Orchestra; Shreveport Opera; Shreveport Metropolitan Ballet
Louisiana	Shreveport	Shreveport Municipal Memorial Auditorium		1929	3,200	

==== Maine–Massachusetts ====
State	Location	Venue	Room	Date built	Seats	Resident organizations
Maine	Ellsworth	Grand Auditorium		1938	800	
Maine	Orono	Collins Center for the Arts	Hutchins Concert Hall	1986	1,629	Bangor Symphony Orchestra
Maine	Portland	Merrill Auditorium		1911	1,900	Portland Symphony Orchestra
Maryland	Baltimore	Joseph Meyerhoff Symphony Hall		1982	2,443	Baltimore Symphony Orchestra
Maryland	Baltimore	Earl and Darielle Linehan Concert Hall		2014	375	UMBC Symphony Orchestra
Maryland	Baltimore	Pier Six Pavilion		1991		
Maryland	College Park	Clarice Smith Performing Arts Center	Dekelboum Concert Hall	2001	1,100	University of Maryland Symphony Orchestra, UM Choirs
Maryland	Hagerstown	Maryland Theatre		1915	1,300	Maryland Symphony Orchestra
Maryland	Rockville	Strathmore Arts Center	Music Center at Strathmore	2005	1,976	Baltimore Symphony Orchestra (second home); Washington Performing Arts Society; National Philharmonic Orchestra
Massachusetts	Barnstable	Barnstable High School	Barnstable High School Performing Arts Center	1999	1,400	Cape Cod Symphony Orchestra
Massachusetts	Boston	MGM Music Hall at Fenway		2022	5,000	
Massachusetts	Boston	New England Conservatory	Jordan Hall	1903	1,019	
Massachusetts	Boston	Symphony Hall		1900	2,625	Boston Symphony Orchestra, Boston Pops Orchestra
Massachusetts	Boston	Boston Opera House		1928	2,500	Boston Ballet
Massachusetts	Boston	Boch Center	Wang Theater	1925	3,700	Boston Ballet
Massachusetts	Cambridge	Harvard University	Sanders Theatre	1875	1,166	
Massachusetts	Cambridge	Harvard University	John Knowles Paine Concert Hall	1914	437	
Massachusetts	Cambridge	Harvard University	Lowell Lecture Hall	1902	352	
Massachusetts	Cambridge	M.I.T.	Kresge Auditorium	1955	1,226	
Massachusetts	Springfield	Symphony Hall		1912	2,611	Springfield Symphony Orchestra
Massachusetts	Plymouth	Memorial Hall		1926	1,400	Plymouth Philharmonic Orchestra
Massachusetts	Lenox	Tanglewood	Seiji Ozawa Hall	1994	1,200	
Massachusetts	Worcester	Mechanics Hall		1857	1,615	

==== Michigan ====
Location	Venue	Room	Date built	Seats	Resident organizations
Ann Arbor	University of Michigan	Hill Auditorium	1913	3,538	
Ypsilanti	Eastern Michigan University	Pease Auditorium	1914	1,700	
Berrien Springs	Howard Performing Arts Center at Andrews University	Concert Hall	2003	832	
Dearborn	Ford Community and Performing Arts Center	Theatre	1997	1,201	
Detroit	Detroit Masonic Temple	Masonic Temple Theatre	1922	4,404	Olympia Entertainment
Detroit	Detroit Opera House		1922	2,700	Michigan Opera Theatre, Nederlander
Detroit	The Fillmore Detroit		1925	2,200	Detroit Music Awards in April
Detroit	Fisher Theatre		1927	2,089	Nederlander
Detroit	Max M. Fisher Music Center	Orchestra Hall	1919	2,014	Detroit Symphony Orchestra
Detroit	Fox Theatre		1928	5,045	Olympia Entertainment
Detroit	Music Hall Center for the Performing Arts		1928	1,700	The Kresge Foundation
Detroit	Wayne State University	Bonstelle Theatre	1903	1,173	
Detroit	Wayne State University	Hillberry Theatre	1916	532	
East Lansing	Wharton Center for Performing Arts at Michigan State University	Cobb Great Hall	1982	2,420	Lansing Symphony Orchestra
Flint	Flint Cultural Center	The Whiting	1967	2,043	Flint Symphony Orchestra
Kalamazoo	Miller Auditorium at Western Michigan University		1968	3,497	
Midland	Midland Center for the Arts	Auditorium	2000	1,500	Midland Symphony Orchestra
Muskegon	Frauenthal Center for the Performing Arts	Theatre	1929	1,726	Miss Michigan, West Michigan Symphony Orchestra
Port Huron	McMorran Place	Theater	1960	1,157	International Symphony Orchestra
Port Huron	Riviera Theatre (Port Huron)	Theater	1890	500	
Rochester	Oakland University	Varner Recital Hall	1964	425	Oakland Symphony Orchestra

==== Minnesota ====
Location	Venue	Room	Date built	Seats	Resident organizations
Austin	Paramount Theatre		1929	622	Austin Symphony Orchestra
Duluth	Duluth Entertainment Convention Center	Auditorium	1966	2,400	Duluth Superior Symphony Orchestra, Minnesota Ballet
Duluth	NorShor Theatre		1910	600	
Duluth	University of Minnesota Duluth	Weber Music Hall	2003	350	
Mankato	Minnesota State University	Elias J. Halling Recital Hall	1967	350	
Mankato	Mayo Clinic Health System Event Center	Arena	1994	5,280	
Mankato	Mayo Clinic Health System Event Center	Grand Hall	2017	2,000	
Minneapolis	Cowles Center for Dance and the Performing Arts	Goodale Theater	1910	505	Minnesota Dance Theatre
Minneapolis	The Fillmore Minneapolis		2020	1,850	
Minneapolis	First Avenue		1937	1,550	
Minneapolis	MacPhail Center for Music	Antonello Hall	2008	225	
Minneapolis	Minneapolis Armory		1935	8,400	
Minneapolis	Orchestra Hall		1974	2,500	Minnesota Orchestra
Minneapolis	Orpheum Theatre		1921	2,600	
Minneapolis	Pantages Theatre		1916	1,014	
Minneapolis	State Theatre		1921	2,181	
Minneapolis	University of Minnesota	Ted Mann Concert Hall	1993	1,126	
Minneapolis	University of Minnesota	Northrop Auditorium	1929	2,800	
Minneapolis	Varsity Theater		1915	550	
Moorhead	Roland Dille Center for the Arts	Delmar J. Hansen Theater	1966	900	
Northfield	Carleton College	Kracum Performance Hall	2017	400	
Rochester	Mayo Civic Center	Auditorium	1938	3,000	
Rochester	Mayo Civic Center	Presentation Hall	1939	1,084	
Saint Cloud	Paramount Center for the Arts		1921	1,700	
Saint Cloud	Saint Cloud State University	Performing Arts Center	1968	300	
Saint Paul	Fitzgerald Theater	Auditorium	1910	1,058	Minnesota Public Radio
Saint Paul	Ordway Center for the Performing Arts	Music Theater	1985	1,900	Minnesota Opera
Saint Paul	Ordway Center for the Performing Arts	Concert Hall	2015	1,093	Saint Paul Chamber Orchestra
Saint Paul	Palace Theatre		1916	2,500	
Saint Paul	St. Catherine University	O'Shaughnessy Auditorium	1971	1,700	

==== Mississippi-Montana ====
State	Location	Venue	Room	Date built	Seats	Resident organizations
Mississippi	Oxford	University of Mississippi; Gertrude C. Ford Center for the Performing Arts	Main Performance Hall	2002	1,160	
Mississippi	Cleveland	Delta State University; Bologna Performing Arts Center	Delta & Pine Land Theater	1995	1,178	
Mississippi	Meridian	Temple Theater		1924	1,800	
Mississippi	Meridian	Riley Center	Auditorium	2006	950	
Mississippi	Meridian	Riley Center	Studio Theater	2006	200	
Mississippi	Jackson	Thalia Mara Hall		1968	2,040	
Mississippi	Biloxi	Saenger Theatre		1929	1,500	
Mississippi	Hattiesburg	Saenger Theater		1929	997	
Missouri	Columbia	Missouri Theatre	Main stage	1928	1,209	Missouri Symphony
Missouri	Columbia	University of Missouri; Jesse Hall	Jesse Auditorium	1894/1953	1,732	University of Missouri School of Music
Missouri	Kansas City	Kauffman Center for the Performing Arts	Muriel Kauffman Theatre	2011	1,800	Lyric Opera of Kansas City, Kansas City Ballet
Missouri	Kansas City	Kauffman Center for the Performing Arts	Helzberg Hall	2011	1,600	Kansas City Symphony
Missouri	Kansas City	Folly Theater	Concert Hall	1900	1,078	Kansas City Chamber Music Series
Missouri	Kansas City	Municipal Auditorium	Music Hall	1935	2,400	
Missouri	Kansas City	Lyric Theatre	Concert Hall	1926	3,000	
Missouri	Kansas City	Uptown Theater	Concert Hall	1928	1,700	
Missouri	Kansas City	Midland Theatre	Concert Hall	1927	3,573	
Missouri	Springfield	Gillioz Theatre		1926	1,015	
Missouri	Springfield	Juanita K. Hammons Hall		1992	2,220	Springfield Symphony Orchestra
Missouri	St. Joseph	Missouri Theater		1927	1,200	St. Joseph Symphony
Missouri	St. Louis	Peabody Opera House		1934	3,100	
Missouri	St. Louis	Powell Symphony Hall		1968	2,683	St. Louis Symphony
Missouri	St. Louis	Fox Theatre	Concert Hall	1929	4,426	
Montana	Billings	Alberta Bair Theater		1931	1,400	Billings Symphony Orchestra

==== Nebraska–New Mexico ====
State	Location	Venue	Room	Date built	Seats	Resident organizations
Nebraska	Lincoln	Lied Center for Performing Arts	Main stage	1990	2,210	Lincoln's Symphony Orchestra
Nebraska	Omaha	Holland Performing Arts Center	Peter Kiewit Concert Hall	2005	2,005	Omaha Symphony Orchestra
Nebraska	Omaha	Joslyn Art Museum	Witherspoon Concert Hall	1931	1,001	Omaha Symphony Orchestra smaller ensembles; various
Nebraska	Omaha	Orpheum Theater	Slosburg Hall	1927	2,805	Opera Omaha; various national and international touring acts
Nebraska	Omaha	Scottish Rite Center		1914	480	
Nevada	Paradise	Performing Arts Center, University of Nevada, Las Vegas	The Artemus W. Ham Concert Hall	1976	1,832	
Nevada	Reno	Pioneer Center for the Performing Arts	Pioneer Center Theater	1967	1,500	Reno Philharmonic Orchestra
Nevada	Las Vegas	Smith Center for the Performing Arts	Reynolds Hall	2012	2,050	Las Vegas Philharmonic; Nevada Ballet Theatre
Nevada	Las Vegas	Smith Center for the Performing Arts	Cabaret Jazz Theater	2012	258	
Nevada	Las Vegas	Smith Center for the Performing Arts	Troesh Studio Theater	2012	250	
New Hampshire	Concord	Capitol Center for the Arts	Auditorium	2003	1,307	
New Hampshire	Durham	Paul Creative Arts Center	Johnson Theatre	1960	688	UNH School of Music
New Hampshire	Portsmouth	The Music Hall (Portsmouth)		1878	906	Portsmouth Symphony Orchestra
New Jersey	Madison	Dorothy Young Center for the Arts, Drew University	Concert Hall	2005	450	
New Jersey	Montclair	Montclair State University College of the Arts	Alexander Kasser Theatre	2004	500	
New Jersey	Newark	Newark Symphony Hall	Sarah Vaughan Concert Hall	1925	3,500	Garden State Ballet
New Jersey	Newark	New Jersey Performing Arts Center	Victoria Hall	1997	514	
New Jersey	Newark	New Jersey Performing Arts Center	Prudential Hall	1997	2,800	New Jersey Symphony Orchestra
New Jersey	New Brunswick	Rutgers University	Nicholas Music Center		740	
New Jersey	Ocean City	Ocean City Music Pier		1928	826	Ocean City POPS
New Jersey	Princeton	Alexander Hall	Richardson Auditorium	1894	900	
New Mexico	Albuquerque	University of New Mexico Center for the Arts	Popejoy Hall	1975	1,985	New Mexico Symphony Orchestra
New Mexico	Albuquerque	National Hispanic Cultural Center	Roy E. Disney Center's "Journal Theatre"	2005	691	New Mexico Symphony Orchestra
New Mexico	Albuquerque	KiMo Theater		1927	650	
New Mexico	Santa Fe	Lensic Theater		2001	851	Santa Fe Symphony Orchestra; Aspen Santa Fe Ballet

==== New York ====
See also Broadway theatre for a listing of the theatres that support Broadway shows.

Location	Venue	Room	Date built	Seats	Resident organizations
Albany	Palace Theatre		1931	2,844	Albany Symphony Orchestra
Albany	The Egg	Kitty Carlisle Hart Theatre	1978	982	
Albany	The Egg	Lewis A. Swyer Theatre	1978	450	
Annandale-on-Hudson	Richard B. Fisher Center for the Performing Arts	Sosnoff Theater	2003	900	Bard Music Festival
Binghamton	Anderson Center for the Performing Arts, Binghamton University	Osterhout Concert Theater	1985	1,190	
Binghamton	Anderson Center for the Performing Arts, Binghamton University	Chamber Hall	1985	416	
Binghamton	Anderson Center for the Performing Arts, Binghamton University	Watters Theater	1985	558	
Binghamton	Broome County Forum			1,519	Binghamton Philharmonic, Tri-Cities Opera
Brooklyn	Kings Theatre (Brooklyn)		1929	3,000	
Brooklyn	Brooklyn Steel		2017	1,800	
Brooklyn	Brooklyn Paramount Theater		1928	2,700	
Brooklyn	The Brooklyn Hangar			3,000	
Brooklyn	Music Hall of Williamsburg		2007	650	
Brooklyn	Barclays Center		2012	19,000	
Brooklyn	Elsewhere (music venue)		2017	675	
Brookville	Tilles Center for the Performing Arts, LIU Post			2,242	
Buffalo	Kleinhans Music Hall		1940	2,839	Buffalo Philharmonic Orchestra
Elmont	UBS Arena		2021	19,000	
Geneva	Smith Center for the Arts		1894	1,408	
Ithaca	Cornell University	Bailey Hall	1912	1,324	
Ithaca	Ithaca College School of Music	Ford Hall	1965	644	
Ithaca	State Theatre		1928	1,500	
New York City	Baruch College	Mason Hall	1929	1,052	
New York City	Brooklyn Academy of Music	Howard Gillman Opera House	1861	2,109	
New York City	Brooklyn Conservatory of Music		1908		Brooklyn Philharmonic
New York City	Apollo Theater		1914	1,500	
New York City	Beacon Theatre (New York City)		1929	2,894	
New York City	Broadway Theatre (53rd Street)		1924	1,761	
New York City	New Amsterdam Theatre		1903	1,747	
New York City	Minskoff Theatre		1973	1,710	
New York City	St. James Theatre		1927	1,709	
New York City	Palace Theatre (New York City)		1913	1,648	
New York City	Majestic Theatre (Broadway)		1927	1,645	
New York City	Lyric Theatre (New York City, 1998)		1998	1,622	
New York City	Marquis Theatre		1986	1,612	
New York City	Winter Garden Theatre		1911	1,526	
New York City	Lunt-Fontanne Theatre		1910	1,519	
New York City	Neil Simon Theatre		1927	1,467	
New York City	Shubert Theatre (Broadway)		1913	1,460	
New York City	Imperial Theatre		1923	1,443	
New York City	Al Hirschfeld Theatre		1924	1,424	
New York City	Richard Rodgers Theatre		1925	1,400	Hamilton (musical)
New York City	Nederlander Theatre		1921	1,235	
New York City	August Wilson Theatre		1925	1,228	
New York City	Broadhurst Theatre		1917	1,186	
New York City	Ambassador Theatre (New York City)		1921	1,125	
New York City	Ethel Barrymore Theatre		1928	1,096	
New York City	Lena Horne Theatre		1926	1,094	
New York City	Longacre Theatre		1913	1,091	
New York City	James Earl Jones Theatre		1912	1,084	
New York City	Vivian Beaumont Theater		1965	1,080	
New York City	Gerald Schoenfeld Theatre		1917	1,079	
New York City	Bernard B. Jacobs Theatre		1927	1,078	
New York City	Eugene O'Neill Theatre		1925	1,066	
New York City	Stephen Sondheim Theatre		1918	1,055	
New York City	Belasco Theatre		1907	1,018	
New York City	Music Box Theatre		1921	1,009	
New York City	Studio 54		1927	1,009	
New York City	Hudson Theatre		1903	970	
New York City	Walter Kerr Theatre		1921	945	
New York City	Lyceum Theatre (Broadway)		1903	922	
New York City	Circle in the Square Theatre		1972	840	
New York City	John Golden Theatre		1927	805	
New York City	Booth Theatre		1913	766	
New York City	Todd Haimes Theatre		1918	740	
New York City	Samuel J. Friedman Theatre		1925	650	
New York City	Hayes Theater		1912	597	
New York City	Carnegie Hall	Stern Auditorium	1891	2,804	
New York City	Carnegie Hall	Weill Recital Hall	1891	268	
New York City	Carnegie Hall	Zankel Hall	1891	599	
New York City	Kaufman Center	Merkin Concert Hall	1978	451	
New York City	Florence Gould Hall		1968	400	Alliance Française; New York Theater Ballet
New York City	Joyce Theater		1982	472	
New York City	Gershwin Theatre		1972	1,933	Wicked (musical)
New York City	Juilliard School	Morse Recital Hall		680	
New York City	Juilliard School	Paul Recital Hall	1969	278	
New York City	Juilliard School	Peter J. Sharp Theater		933	
New York City	92nd Street Y	Kaufmann Concert Hall	1930	917	
New York City	LaGuardia High School	LaGuardia Concert Hall	1984	1,146	
New York City	Ed Sullivan Theater		1927	457	
New York City	Lincoln Center for the Performing Arts	Alice Tully Hall	1969	1,096	The Chamber Music Society of Lincoln Center
New York City	Lincoln Center for the Performing Arts	David Geffen Hall	1962	2,738	New York Philharmonic
New York City	Lincoln Center for the Performing Arts	Metropolitan Opera House	1966	3,900	Metropolitan Opera
New York City	Lincoln Center for the Performing Arts	David H. Koch Theater	1964	2,755	New York City Ballet
New York City	Manhattan School of Music	Neidorff-Karpati Hall	1931	626	
New York City	Palladium Times Square		1974	2,150	
New York City	New York City Center	Main stage	1922	2,750	
New York City	United Palace		1930	3,350	
New York City	Skirball Center for the Performing Arts		2003	850	
New York City	Kupferberg Center for the Arts at Queens College	Colden Auditorium	1961	2,127	
New York City	Kupferberg Center for the Arts at Queens College	Samuel J. and Ethel LeFrak Concert Hall	1992	489	
New York City	Gerald W. Lynch Theater		1988	595	
New York City	Radio City Music Hall		1932	6,015	Madison Square Garden Entertainment
New York City	Hulu Theater		1968	5,600	Madison Square Garden Entertainment
New York City	Steinway Hall		1925	300	
New York City	Madison Square Garden		1968	20,789	
New York City	Symphony Space	Peter Jay Sharp Theater	1978	760	New York Gilbert and Sullivan Players
New York City	The Town Hall		1921	1,500	
Queens	Citi Field		2009	41,922	
Rochester	Eastman Theatre	Kodak Hall	1922	2,400	Rochester Philharmonic Orchestra; Eastman Wind Ensemble
Rochester	Eastman Theatre	Kilbourn Hall	1922	444	Eastman School of Music
Rochester	Eastman Theatre	Hatch Recital Hall	2010	222	Eastman School of Music
Rochester	Hochstein Performance Hall		1890 (renovated 1999)	847	Hochstein School of Music & Dance
Rochester	Temple Building	Temple Theater	1925	1,000+	
Rochester	Water Street Music Hall	The Hall	1976	1,000	
Rochester	Water Street Music Hall	The Club at Water Street	1976	350	
Rochester	Nazareth University Arts Center Complex	Callahan Theater	2009	1,000	
Rochester	Nazareth University Arts Center Complex	Beston Hall, Glazer Music Performance Center	2009	550	Nazareth School of Music
Rochester	Nazareth University Arts Center Complex	Wilmot Recital Hall		190	
Rochester	Kodak Center	Kodak Center Theater	1958	2,022	
Rochester	RIT Performing Arts Center		2026	750	
Rochester	West Herr Performing Arts Center	West Herr Auditorium Theatre	1930	2,500	Rochester Broadway Theatre League
Saratoga Springs	Saratoga Performing Arts Center		1966	5,000	Philadelphia Orchestra, New York City Ballet (in summer)
Syracuse	Landmark Theatre		1928	2,900	
Syracuse	Oncenter	Crouse-Hinds Theater	1975	2,117	The Syracuse Orchestra
Port Chester	Capitol Theatre		1923	1,500	Residents of Westchester
Troy	Troy Savings Bank Music Hall		1875	1,253	Music Hall Association, Troy Chromatic Concerts, Albany Symphony Orchestra
Utica	Stanley Theater		1928	2,963	
Wantagh	Jones Beach Theater		1952	15,000	
Westbury	Theatre at Westbury		1956	2,870	

==== North Carolina–North Dakota ====
State	Location	Venue	Room	Date built	Seats	Resident organizations
North Carolina	Asheville	U.S. Cellular Center	Thomas Wolfe Auditorium	1974	2,431	
North Carolina	Boone	Appalachian State University	Schaefer Center for the Performing Arts	1974	1,684	
North Carolina	Boone	Appalachian State University	Rosen Concert Hall	1983	440	
North Carolina	Charlotte	North Carolina Blumenthal Performing Arts Center	Belk Theater	1992	2,100	Charlotte Symphony Orchestra
North Carolina	Charlotte	Ovens Auditorium		1955	2,460	
North Carolina	Durham	Carolina Theatre	Fletcher Hall	1926	1,048	
North Carolina	Durham	Durham Performing Arts Center		2008	2,712	
North Carolina	Fayetteville	Crown Complex	Theatre	1997	2,440	
North Carolina	Greensboro	Carolina Theatre of Greensboro		1927	1,075	Greensboro Ballet
North Carolina	Raleigh	Duke Energy Center for the Performing Arts	Meymandi Concert Hall	2001	1,700	North Carolina Symphony
North Carolina	Raleigh	Duke Energy Center for the Performing Arts	Raleigh Memorial Auditorium	1932	2,277	
North Carolina	Winston-Salem	Stevens Center		1983	1,380	
North Carolina	Winston-Salem	Lawrence Joel Veterans Memorial Coliseum		1989	14,407	
North Dakota	Bismarck	Belle Mehus Auditorium		1914	833	Northern Plains Dance and the Bismarck-Mandan Symphony Orchestra
North Dakota	Fargo	Fargo Theater		1926	870	
North Dakota	Fargo	North Dakota State University	Festival Concert Hall	1981	997	Fargo-Moorhead Symphony Orchestra
North Dakota	Grand Forks	University of North Dakota	Chester Fritz Auditorium	1972	2,384	
North Dakota	Minot	Minot State University	Ann Nicole Nelson Hall	1925	950	

==== Ohio ====
Location	Venue	Room	Date built	Seats	Resident organizations
Athens	Ohio University	Templeton-Blackburn Alumni Memorial Auditorium	1928	2,000	
Cincinnati	Aronoff Center	Procter & Gamble Hall	1995	2,719	Cincinnati Symphony Orchestra
Cincinnati	Aronoff Center	Jarson-Kaplan Theater	1995	437	
Cincinnati	Aronoff Center	Fifth Third Bank Theater	1995	150	
Cincinnati	Cincinnati Music Hall	Springer Auditorium	1878	2,550	Cincinnati Symphony Orchestra, Cincinnati Pops Orchestra, Cincinnati Opera, Cincinnati May Festival
Cincinnati	Taft Theatre		1928	2,500	
Cincinnati	Memorial Hall OTR	Anderson Theater	1908	556	
Cincinnati	University of Cincinnati – College-Conservatory of Music	Cohen Family Studio Theater	1999	150	
Cincinnati	University of Cincinnati – College-Conservatory of Music	Corbett Auditorium	1996	738	
Cincinnati	University of Cincinnati – College-Conservatory of Music	Diertle Vocal Arts Center	1995	100	
Cincinnati	University of Cincinnati – College-Conservatory of Music	Patricia Corbett Theater	1971	380	
Cincinnati	University of Cincinnati – College-Conservatory of Music	Robert J. Werner Recital Hall	1999	300	
Cincinnati	University of Cincinnati – College-Conservatory of Music	Watson Recital Hall		140	
Cleveland	Severance Hall		1931	2,100	Cleveland Orchestra
Cleveland	Public Auditorium		1922	10,000	
Cleveland	Cleveland Institute of Music	Kulas Hall	1961	535	
Cleveland	Cleveland Institute of Music	Mixon Hall	2007	235	
Columbus	Capital University Conservatory of Music	Mees Hall	1926		
Columbus	Lincoln Theatre		1928	582	Columbus Jazz Arts Group
Columbus	Ohio State University	Drake Performance and Event Center	1972	600	Ohio State University Department of Theatre
Columbus	Ohio Theatre		1928	2,779	Columbus Symphony Orchestra
Columbus	Palace Theatre		1926	2,695	
Columbus	Riffe Center Theatre Complex	Speaker Jo Ann Davidson Theatre	1989	903	
Columbus	Southern Theatre		1896	925	Opera Columbus, Columbus Jazz Orchestra, Chamber Music Columbus, ProMusica Chamber Orchestra
Columbus	Wexner Center for the Arts	Mershon Auditorium	1957	2,500	
Dayton	Schuster Performing Arts Center	Mead Theatre	2003	2,300	Dayton Opera, Dayton Philharmonic Orchestra
Mansfield	Renaissance Theatre		1927	1,600	Mansfield Symphony, Renaissance Broadway Series, Renaissance Summer Musical
New Albany	McCoy Center		2008	786	
Oberlin	Oberlin College	Finney Chapel	1908	1,451	Oberlin Conservatory of Music
Toledo	Toledo Museum of Art	Peristyle	1933	1,750	Toledo Symphony Orchestra
Westerville	Otterbein University	Cowan Hall: Fritsche Theatre	1951	1,047	Otterbein Department of Theatre and Dance
Youngstown	DeYor Performing Arts Center	Powers Auditorium	1969	2,303	Youngstown Symphony
Youngstown	Stambaugh Auditorium		1926	2,553	Opera Western Reserve

==== Oklahoma–Oregon ====
State	Location	Venue	Room	Date built	Seats	Resident organizations
Oklahoma	Oklahoma City	Civic Center Music Hall	Thelma Gaylord Performing Arts Theatre	1937	2,481	Canterbury Choral Society, Oklahoma City Philharmonic, Lyric Theatre of Oklahoma, Oklahoma City Ballet, Civic Center Foundation
Oklahoma	Tulsa	Tulsa Performing Arts Center	Chapman Music Hall	1977	2,365	Tulsa Symphony Orchestra, Chamber Music Tulsa, Ballet Tulsa, Tulsa Opera, Tulsa Oratorio Chorus
Oklahoma	Tulsa	Tulsa Performing Arts Center	John H. Williams Theatre	1977	437	
Oklahoma	Tulsa	VanTrease Performing Arts Center for Education		1997	1,500	Tulsa Community College Signature Symphony
Oregon	Eugene	Hult Center for the Performing Arts	Silva Concert Hall	1982	2,500	Eugene Symphony, Eugene Ballet, Eugene Opera, Eugene Concert Choir, Oregon Bach Festival, Oregon Mozart Players
Oregon	Eugene	The John G. Shedd Institute for the Arts	Jaqua Concert Hall	1926	816	The American Symphonia, Oregon Festival of American Music
Oregon	Eugene	The John G. Shedd Institute for the Arts	Recital Hall	1926	176	
Oregon	Eugene	The John G. Shedd Institute for the Arts	Great Hall	1926	200	
Oregon	Portland	Portland's Centers for the Arts	Arlene Schnitzer Concert Hall	1984	2,776	Oregon Symphony
Oregon	Portland	Portland's Centers for the Arts	Keller Auditorium	1917	2,992	Portland Opera, Oregon Ballet Theatre
Oregon	Portland	Antoinette Hatfield Hall	Newmark Theatre	1987	880	
Oregon	Portland	Antoinette Hatfield Hall	Dolores Winningstad Theatre	1987	304	
Oregon	Portland	Antoinette Hatfield Hall	Brunish Theatre	1987	200	
Oregon	Portland	Revolution Hall		1924	830	
Oregon	Portland	Aladdin Theater		1927	620	

==== Pennsylvania-Rhode Island ====
State	Location	Venue	Room	Date built	Seats	Resident organizations
Pennsylvania	Allentown	Miller Symphony Hall (renamed from Allentown Symphony Hall)		1896	1,200	Allentown Symphony Orchestra
Pennsylvania	Bethlehem	Zoellner Arts Center	Baker Hall	1997	946	
Pennsylvania	Erie	Warner Theatre		1976	2,506	Erie Philharmonic, Lake Erie Ballet
Pennsylvania	Harrisburg	Pennsylvania State Capitol Complex	The Forum	1931	1,763	Harrisburg Symphony Orchestra
Pennsylvania	Hershey	Hershey Theatre		1933	1,904	
Pennsylvania	Johnstown	Pasquerilla Performing Arts Center	Main stage	1991	1,000	Johnstown Symphony Orchestra
Pennsylvania	Lancaster	Franklin & Marshall College	Barshinger Center in Hensel Hall		500	
Pennsylvania	Lancaster	The Trust Performing Arts Center	Great Hall	1912	300	
Pennsylvania	Lancaster	American Music Theatre	Main auditorium		1,604	
Pennsylvania	New Castle	Scottish Rite Cathedral	Auditorium	1926	2,800	The Cathedral Foundation
Pennsylvania	Philadelphia	Academy of Music		1857	2,509	Opera Philadelphia, Pennsylvania Ballet
Pennsylvania	Philadelphia	Curtis Institute of Music	Field Concert Hall	1924	240	
Pennsylvania	Philadelphia	Dell Music Center		1972	5,344	
Pennsylvania	Philadelphia	Drexel University	Main Building Auditorium	1891	1,000	Drexel University Orchestra, Drexel University Chorus
Pennsylvania	Philadelphia	Kimmel Center for the Performing Arts	Marian Anderson Hall	2001	2,500	Philadelphia Orchestra, No Name Pops
Pennsylvania	Philadelphia	Kimmel Center for the Performing Arts	Perelman Theater	2001	650	The Chamber Orchestra of Philadelphia; Philadelphia Chamber Music Society
Pennsylvania	Philadelphia	Highmark Mann	TD Pavilion	1976	13,000	Philadelphia Orchestra (in summer)
Pennsylvania	Philadelphia	Highmark Mann	Skyline Stage		7,500	
Pennsylvania	Philadelphia	Temple University, Boyer College of Music and Dance	Lew Klein Auditorium	1974	1,200	
Pennsylvania	Philadelphia	University of Pennsylvania	Irvine Auditorium	1929	1,260	
Pennsylvania	Philadelphia	Annenberg Center for the Performing Arts	Zellerbach Theatre	1971	960	
Pennsylvania	Philadelphia	Annenberg Center for the Performing Arts	Harold Prince Theatre	1971	211	
Pennsylvania	Philadelphia	Annenberg Center for the Performing Arts	Bruce Montgomery Theatre	1971	120	
Pennsylvania	Venice Island Performing Arts & Recreation Center		2014	250		
Pennsylvania	Pittsburgh and Allegheny County	Benedum Center		1928	2,885	Pittsburgh Opera, Pittsburgh Ballet Theatre
Pennsylvania	Pittsburgh and Allegheny County	Carnegie Mellon School of Music	Alumni Concert Hall	1916	125	Carnegie Mellon groups
Pennsylvania	Pittsburgh and Allegheny County	Carnegie Music Hall		1895	1,950	
Pennsylvania	Pittsburgh and Allegheny County	Heinz Hall for the Performing Arts		1927	2,662	Pittsburgh Symphony Orchestra
Pennsylvania	Pittsburgh and Allegheny County	Braddock Carnegie Music Hall		1893	964	
Pennsylvania	Pittsburgh and Allegheny County	Homestead Carnegie Music Hall		1898	1,000	
Pennsylvania	Pittsburgh and Allegheny County	Carnegie Music Hall of Carnegie PA		1901	880	
Pennsylvania	Reading	Miller Center for the Arts		2007	500	Reading Area Community College
Pennsylvania	Reading	Santander Performing Arts Center		1886	1,752	Reading Symphony Orchestra
Pennsylvania	Reading	Scottish Rite Cathedral		1980	1,300	
Pennsylvania	Scranton	Scranton Cultural Center	Harry and Jeannette Weinberg Theatre	1930	1,866	
Pennsylvania	State College	Eisenhower Auditorium		1974	2,500	
Pennsylvania	State College	Music Building I	Esber Recital Hall	1963	400	
Pennsylvania	State College	Schwab Auditorium		1903	950	
Wilkes-Barre	F.M. Kirby Center		1937	1,832		
Williamsport	Community Arts Center		1928	2,078	Williamsport Symphony Orchestra, Uptown Music Collective	
Rhode Island	Providence	Providence Performing Arts Center		1928	3,000	
Rhode Island	Providence	Veterans Memorial Auditorium		1950	1,931	Rhode Island Philharmonic Orchestra
Rhode Island	Woonsocket	The Stadium Theatre		1926	1,101	The Encore Repertory Company

==== South Carolina–Tennessee ====
State	Location	Venue	Room	Date built	Seats	Resident organizations
South Carolina	Columbia	Koger Center for the Arts	Gonzales Hall	1988	2,256	South Carolina Philharmonic
South Carolina	Greenville	Peace Center for the Performing Arts	Peace Concert Hall	1990	2,100	The Greenville Symphony
South Carolina	Greenville	Peace Center for the Performing Arts	Dorothy Hipp Gunter Theater	1990	439	
South Carolina	North Charleston	North Charleston Coliseum and Performing Arts Center	North Charleston Performing Arts Center	1999	2,300	
South Dakota	Sioux Falls	Washington Pavilion of Arts and Science	Mary W. Sommervold Hall	1999	1,835	South Dakota Symphony Orchestra
Tennessee	Clarksville	George and Sharon Mabry Concert Hall		1991	600	Gateway Chamber Orchestra, Austin Peay Orchestra
Tennessee	Greeneville	Niswonger Performing Arts Center		2004	1,135	
Tennessee	Knoxville	Tennessee Theatre		1928	1,600	Knoxville Symphony Orchestra, Knoxville Opera
Tennessee	Memphis	Cannon Center for the Performing Arts		2003	2,100	Memphis Symphony Orchestra
Tennessee	Nashville	Ryman Auditorium		1892	2,362	
Tennessee	Nashville	Schermerhorn Symphony Center	Laura Turner Concert Hall	2006	1,900	Nashville Symphony
Tennessee	Nashville	Tennessee Performing Arts Center	Andrew Jackson Hall	1980	2,472	Nashville Opera, Nashville Ballet, Tennessee Repertory Theatre
Tennessee	Nashville	Tennessee Performing Arts Center	James K. Polk Theater	1980	1,075	
Tennessee	Nashville	Tennessee Performing Arts Center	Andrew Johnson Theater	1980	256	
Tennessee	Nashville	Vanderbilt University, Blair School of Music	Ingram Center for the Performing Arts	2001	609	Vanderbilt University Orchestra
Tennessee	Nashville	Vanderbilt University, Blair School of Music	Turner Recital Hall	1980	202	
Tennessee	Nashville	War Memorial Auditorium		1925	2,000	
Tennessee	Oak Ridge	Oak Ridge High School	Auditorium	2008	1,400	Oak Ridge Symphony Orchestra

==== Texas ====
Location	Venue	Room	Date built	Seats	Resident organizations
Abilene	Paramount Theatre		1930	1,187	
Amarillo	Amarillo Civic Center	Auditorium		2,848	
Amarillo	Globe-News Center for the Performing Arts		2006	1,300	
Arlington	MetroCenter		2005	1,750	Symphony Arlington
Arlington	AT&T Stadium		2009	80,000	Dallas Cowboys
Arlington	Texas Hall		1965	2,625	University of Texas at Arlington
Arlington	Globe Life Field		2020	40,300	Texas Rangers (baseball)Major League Baseball
Arlington	Theatre Arlington		1973	199	
Austin	Long Center for the Performing Arts	Michael and Susan Dell Hall	2008	2,400	Austin Symphony Orchestra
Austin	Paramount Theatre		1915	1,270	
Austin	Bass Concert Hall		1981	3,000	University of Texas Performing Arts Center
Austin	Darrell K Royal–Texas Memorial Stadium		1924	100,119	
Austin	Moody Theater		2011	2,750	
Beaumont	Julie Rogers Theater		1928	1,681	Symphony of Southeast Texas
Beaumont	Ford Arena		2003	9,737	
Beaumont	Jefferson Theatre		1927	1,400	
Cedar Park	H-E-B Center at Cedar Park		2009	8,000	
College Station	Texas A&M University	Rudder Auditorium		2,500	
College Station	Kyle Field		1927	102,733	
Corpus Christi	American Bank Center	Selena Auditorium	1979	2,500	
Dallas	Undermain Theatre		1984	80	
Dallas	Granada Theater		1946	1,000	
Dallas	Majestic Theatre		1921	1,704	
Dallas	American Airlines Center		2001	21,000	
Dallas	Moody Performance Hall		2012	750	Turtle Creek Chorale, Fine Arts Chamber Players, Orchestra of New Spain, New Texas Symphony Orchestra
Dallas	Music Hall at Fair Park		1925	3,420	
Dallas	Cotton Stadium		1930	92,100	Cotton Bowl Classic
Dallas	Morton H. Meyerson Symphony Center	Eugene McDermott Concert Hall	1989	2,062	Dallas Symphony Orchestra, Turtle Creek Chorale, Dallas Wind Symphony
Dallas	AT&T Performing Arts Center	Margot and Bill Winspear Opera House	2009	2,200	Dallas Opera, Texas Ballet Theater, Margaret McDermott Performance Hall
Dallas	AT&T Performing Arts Center	Dee and Charles Wyly Theatre	2009	650	
Dallas	AT&T Performing Arts Center	Annette Strauss Square	1988	5,000	
Dallas	Caruth Auditorium			490	Meadows Symphony
Dallas	Kay Bailey Hutchison Convention Center		1973	1,730 (Bruton Center for the Arts)	
Dallas	Kay Bailey Hutchison Convention Center			9,294 (Convention Center Arena)	
Denton	Murchison Performing Arts Center	Winspear Performance Hall	1999	1,025	UNT Concert Orchestra
Denton	Murchison Performing Arts Center	DATCU Stadium	2011	30,850	
Denton	Lyric Theatre	1999		400	
El Paso	Abraham Chavez Theatre			2,500	El Paso Symphony Orchestra
El Paso	Don Haskins Center		1977	12,567	
El Paso	Plaza Theatre	Kendle Kidd Performance Hall	1930	2,050	
El Paso	Plaza Theatre	Philanthropy Theatre	2006	200	
Fort Worth	Bass Performance Hall		1998	2,056	Fort Worth Symphony Orchestra
Fort Worth	Mary D. and F. Howard Walsh Center for Performing Arts	Ed Landreth Hall		1,200	
Fort Worth	Dickies Arena		2019	14,000	
Fort Worth	Fort Worth Convention Center		1968	13,500 (Arena)	
Frisco	Toyota Stadium		2005	20,500	
Galveston	Grand 1894 Opera House		1894	1,040	
Galveston	Old Quarter Acoustic Cafe		1996	85	
Garland	Curtis Culwell Center		2005	6,860	
Grand Prairie	Texas Trust CU Theatre		2002	6,350	
Houston	Rice Stadium		1950	47,000	
Houston	Wortham Theater Center	(Alice and George) Brown Theater	1987	2,405	Houston Grand Opera, Houston Ballet
Houston	Wortham Theater Center	(Lillie and Roy) Cullen Theater	1987	1,100	Houston Grand Opera, Houston Ballet, Society for the Performing Arts
Houston	Moores Opera House		1997	800	
Houston	Miller Outdoor Theatre		1923	6,200	
Houston	Hobby Center for the Performing Arts	Sarofim Hall	2006	2,605	Broadway in Houston, Theatre Under the Stars
Houston	Hobby Center for the Performing Arts	Zilkha Hall	2006	550	
Houston	Toyota Center		2003	19,300	
Houston	Morris Cultural Arts Center	Linda and Archie Dunham Theater	2007	1,200	Houston Christian University
Houston	NRG Stadium		2002	72,220	Houston Texans
Houston	Jones Hall		1966	2,912	Houston Symphony, Society for the Performing Arts
Houston	Shell Energy Stadium		2012	22,039	
Houston	Bayou Music Center		1997	2,400	
Houston	University of Houston	Cullen Performance Hall	1950	1,544	
Irving	Irving Arts Center	Carpenter Hall	1990	707	New Philharmonic Orchestra of Irving, Irving Symphony Orchestra, Las Colinas Symphony Orchestra
Irving	Irving Arts Center	Dupree Theater		257	
Irving	Toyota Music Factory		2017	8,000+	
Laredo	Laredo Civic Center	Auditorium		1,978	
Lewisville	Lewisville Grand Theater		2007	294	
Longview	LeTourneau University	Belcher Center	2007	2,000	
Lubbock	Buddy Holly Hall of Performing Arts and Sciences	Helen DeVitt Jones Main Theater	2021	2,209	
Lubbock	Lubbock Memorial Civic Center	Theater	1977	1,395	Lubbock Symphony Orchestra
Lubbock	Jones AT&T Stadium		1947	60,454	
Lubbock	Cactus Theater		1938	426	
Lubbock	Texas Tech University	Hemmle Recital Hall	1979	541	
Lubbock	United Supermarkets Arena		1999	15,300	
Lufkin	Angelina College	Temple Theater		891	Angelina Arts Alliance
Lufkin	The Pines Theater		1925	459	
McAllen	McAllen Performing Arts Center		2016	1,800	
Midland	Wagner Noël Performing Arts Center	The Wagner Noël Theater	2011	1,819	University of Texas of the Permian Basin Music Program, The Midland-Odessa Symphony & Chorale
Midland	Yucca Theater		1929	550	
Odessa	The Ector Theatre		1951	750	
Orange	Lutcher Theater		1980	1,450	
Plano	Plano Event Center		1990	2,500	
Richardson	Charles W. Eisemann Center for Performing Arts	Margaret & Al Hill Performance Hall	2002	1,550	Richardson Symphony Orchestra
San Angelo	San Angelo Performing Arts Coalition	Elta Joyce Murphey Performance Hall	1928	1,370	San Angelo Symphony, Ballet San Angelo
San Angelo	San Angelo Performing Arts Coalition	Brooks & Bates Theater	2016	301	Ballet San Angelo
San Angelo	San Angelo Performing Arts Coalition	San Angelo Health Black Box	2016	120	
San Antonio	Aztec Theatre		1926	1,173	
San Antonio	Majestic Theatre		1929	2,264	San Antonio Symphony
San Antonio	Henry B. González Convention Center	Lila Cockrell Theatre	1968	2,319	
San Antonio	Charline McCombs Empire Theatre		1914	1,766	
San Antonio	Tobin Center for the Performing Arts	H-E-B Performance Hall	2014	1,746	San Antonio Symphony, Ballet San Antonio, Children's Chorus of San Antonio, Children's Fine Arts Series, Opera San Antonio, Youth Orchestras of San Antonio
San Antonio	Tobin Center for the Performing Arts	Carlos Alvarez Studio Theatre	2014	305	Chamber Orchestra of San Antonio, Attic Rep, SOLI Chamber Ensemble, Children's Fine Arts Series,
San Antonio	Tobin Center for the Performing Arts	Will Naylor Smith Plaza	2014	600	
San Antonio	Alamodome		1993	64,000	
San Antonio	Frost Bank Center		2002	19,000	
Sherman	Kidd-Key Auditorium	Performance Hall	1932	1,300	Municipal Building
Stafford	Stafford Centre	Performing Arts Theater	2004	1,155	
Sugar Land	Smart Financial Centre		2017	6,400	
Texarkana	Perot Theatre		1924	1,400	
The Woodlands	Cynthia Woods Mitchell Pavilion		1990	16,500	
Tyler	University of Texas at Tyler	Cowan Center for the Arts		2,000	East Texas Symphony Orchestra
Tyler	Liberty Hall		2011	300	
University Park	McFarlin Memorial Auditorium		1926	2,386	
Waco	Baylor University	Waco Hall	1930	2,200	Waco Symphony Orchestra
Waco	McLane Stadium		2014	45,140	
Waxahachie	Chautauqua Auditorium		1902	2,500	

==== Utah–Virginia ====
State	Location	Venue	Room	Date built	Seats	Resident organizations
Utah	Logan	Ellen Eccles Theatre		1923	1,100	Utah Festival Opera
Utah	Logan	Utah State University	Kent Concert Hall	1967	2,168	Utah State University
Utah	Logan	Utah State University	Performance Hall	2006	421	Utah State University, Fry Street Quartet
Utah	Provo	Music Building	Concert Hall	2023	1,000	BYU Philharmonic Orchestra, BYU choirs
Utah	Provo	Covey Center for the Arts		2007	670	Utah Valley Symphony
Utah	Salt Lake City	Abravanel Hall		1979	2,811	Utah Symphony Orchestra
Utah	Salt Lake City	Kingsbury Hall		1930	1,992	Utah Opera
Utah	Salt Lake City	Libby Gardner Concert Hall		1997	680	Salt Lake Symphony, Utah Philharmonia
Utah	Salt Lake City	Salt Lake Tabernacle		1867	3,500	The Tabernacle Choir at Temple Square, Orchestra at Temple Square, Bells on Temple Square (6 months of the year)
Utah	Salt Lake City	LDS Conference Center		2000	21,000	The Tabernacle Choir at Temple Square, Orchestra at Temple Square, Bells on Temple Square (6 months of the year)
Vermont	Burlington	Flynn Center for the Performing Arts		1930	1,411	
Vermont	Rutland	Paramount Theater		1913	838	
Virginia	Fairfax	George Mason University Center for the Arts		1990	2,000	
Virginia	Harrisonburg	Forbes Center		2010	1,646	James Madison University College of Visual and Performing Arts
Virginia	Newport News	Ferguson Center for the Arts		2005	1,725	
Virginia	Norfolk	Chrysler Hall		1972	2,500	Virginia Symphony Orchestra
Virginia	Richmond	Dominion Arts Center	Richmond CenterStage	1928/1983/2009	1,700	Richmond Symphony, Virginia Opera
Virginia	Vienna	Wolf Trap National Park for the Performing Arts	Filene Center	1971	7,000	

==== Washington–Wisconsin ====
State	Location	Venue	Room	Date built	Seats	Resident organizations
Washington	Bellingham	Mt. Baker Theatre	Walton Theatre	1927	1,517	Bellingham Symphony Orchestra
Washington	Bellingham	Performing Arts Center Concert Hall, Western Washington University		1973	640	
Washington	Seattle	Benaroya Hall	S. Mark Taper Auditorium	1998	2,500	Seattle Symphony Seattle Men's Chorus
Washington	Seattle	McCaw Hall		2003	2,890	Seattle Opera Pacific Northwest Ballet
Washington	Seattle	SIFF Cinema Egyptian		1980	570	
Washington	Spokane	Bing Crosby Theater		1915	756	
Washington	Spokane	Fox Theater	Martin Woldson Theater at the Fox	1931	1,604	Spokane Symphony
Washington	Tacoma	Pantages Theatre		1917	1,169	
Washington	Walla Walla	Cordiner Hall		1968	1,384	Walla Walla Symphony
Washington	Yakima	Capitol Theatre		1920	1,500	Yakima Symphony Orchestra
West Virginia	Charleston	Clay Center for the Arts & Sciences	Maier Foundation Performance Hall	2003	1,883	West Virginia Symphony Orchestra
West Virginia	Charleston	Clay Center for the Arts & Sciences	Walker Theater	2003	200	
West Virginia	Lewisburg	Carnegie Hall, Inc.	Hamilton Auditorium	1902	420	
Wisconsin	Green Bay	Weidner Center	Cofrin Family Hall	1993	2,021	
Wisconsin	Madison	Overture Center	Overture Hall	2004	2,251	Madison Symphony Orchestra
Wisconsin	Milwaukee	Bradley Symphony Center	Allen-Bradley Hall	2021	1,799	Milwaukee Symphony Orchestra
Wisconsin	Milwaukee	Pabst Theater		1895	1,339	
Wisconsin	Milwaukee	Marcus Center	Uihlein Hall	1969	2,305	Florentine Opera, Milwaukee Ballet
Wisconsin	Sheboygan	Stefanie H. Weill Center for the Performing Arts	Stefanie H. Weill Center Theater	1928	1,153	Sheboygan Symphony Orchestra
Wisconsin	Kohler	John M Kohler Memorial Theater	Grand Theater	1957	1,078	Kohler Distinguished Guest Series

== Oceania ==
=== Australia ===
Location	Venue	Room	Date built	Seats	Resident organizations
Adelaide	Elder Conservatorium	Elder Hall	1900	660	
Adelaide	Adelaide Festival Centre	Festival Theatre	1973	2,000	Adelaide Symphony Orchestra
Brisbane	Queensland Performing Arts Centre	Concert Hall	1985	1,800	Queensland Symphony Orchestra
Brisbane	Queensland Conservatorium Griffith University	Conservatorium Theatre	1996	600	
Brisbane	Brisbane City Hall	Main Auditorium	1930	2,500	
Canberra	Canberra School of Music	Llewellyn Hall	1976	1,400	Canberra Symphony Orchestra
Gold Coast	Gold Coast Music Hall		2027	2,800	
Hobart	Federation Concert Hall		2000	1,100	Tasmanian Symphony Orchestra
Melbourne	Arts Centre Melbourne	Hamer Hall	1982	2,677	Melbourne Symphony Orchestra, Royal Melbourne Philharmonic
Melbourne	Melbourne Recital Centre	Elizabeth Murdoch Hall	2009	1,000	Melbourne Chamber Orchestra, Melbourne Symphony Orchestra
Melbourne	Melbourne Town Hall	Main Hall	1887	2,000	Royal Melbourne Philharmonic
Melbourne	Federation Square	The Edge	2002	450	Melbourne City Opera
Melbourne	ABC Southbank Centre	Iwaki Auditorium	1994	400	Melbourne Symphony Orchestra
Melbourne	Melbourne Conservatorium of Music	Melba Hall	1909	340	
Melbourne	Frankston Arts Centre	Theatre	1995	800	Frankston Symphony Orchestra
Perth	Perth Concert Hall	Auditorium	1973	1,729	West Australian Symphony Orchestra
Sydney	City Recital Hall		1999	1,238	Australian Brandenburg Orchestra, Australian Chamber Orchestra, Sydney Philharmonia Choirs
Sydney	Sydney Opera House	Concert Hall	1973	2,679	Sydney Symphony Orchestra, Australian Chamber Orchestra, Sydney Philharmonia Choirs
Sydney	Sydney Opera House	Joan Sutherland Theatre	1973	1,507	
Sydney	Sydney Conservatorium of Music	Verbrugghen Hall	2001	497	
Sydney	Sydney Town Hall	Centennial Hall	1889	2,000	
Sydney	The Concourse, Chatswood	Concert Hall	2011	1,000	Willoughby Symphony Orchestra

=== New Zealand ===
Location	Venue	Room	Date built	Seats	Resident organizations
Auckland	Auckland Town Hall		1911	1,673	Auckland Philharmonia Orchestra
Christchurch	Christchurch Town Hall	Auditorium	1972	2,500	Christchurch Symphony Orchestra
Dunedin	Dunedin Town Hall	Auditorium	1930	2,800	Dunedin Symphony Orchestra
Wellington	Michael Fowler Centre	Auditorium	1983	2,438	New Zealand Symphony Orchestra, Orchestra Wellington

== South and Central America ==
=== Argentina ===
Location	Venue	Room	Date built	Seats	Resident organizations
Bahía Blanca	Teatro Municipal	La Sala Principal	1913	850	
Buenos Aires	Teatro Colón	La Sala Principal	1908	2,500	Buenos Aires Philharmonic; Orquesta Estable del Teatro Colón; Coro Estable del Teatro Colón; Ballet Estable del Teatro Colón
Buenos Aires	Palacio Libertad	Sala Sinfónica Ballena Azul	2015	1,950	Argentine National Symphony Orchestra
Buenos Aires	Palacio Libertad	Sala Argentina	2015	540	
Buenos Aires	Palacio Libertad	Salón de Honor			
Buenos Aires	Teatro Avenida	La Sala Principal	1906	1,200	
Buenos Aires	Usina del Arte	Auditorio	2011	1,200	
Buenos Aires	Teatro Nacional Cervantes	Sala María Guerrero	1921	860	
Córdoba	Gran Teatro de Córdoba	La Sala Principal	1873	1,000	
Córdoba	Teatro del Libertador	Sala Mayor	1891	1,000	
Corrientes	Teatro Oficial Juan de Vera	La Sala Principal	1906	700	
La Plata	Teatro Argentino	La Sala Principal	1999	2,000	
La Plata	Teatro Municipal Coliseo Podestá	La Sala Principal	1886		
Mendoza	Teatro Independencia	La Sala Principal	1925	730	Orquesta Filarmónica de Mendoza
Paraná	Teatro Tres de Febrero	La Sala Principal	1908	850	
Rosario	Teatro El Círculo	La Sala Principal	1904	1,450	
San Juan	Auditorio Juan Victoria	Sala Juan Victoria	1970	976	
San Miguel de Tucumán	Teatro San Martín	La Sala Principal	1912	900	
San Nicolás	Teatro Municipal Rafael de Aguiar	La Sala Principal	1908	1,250	
San Salvador de Jujuy	Teatro Mitre	La Sala Principal	1901	600	
Santa Fe	Teatro Municipal 1° de Mayo	La Sala Principal	1905	800	

=== Bolivia ===
Location	Venue	Room	Date built	Seats	Resident organizations
La Paz	Alberto Saavedra Pérez Municipal Theatre	Sala Principal	1845	650	
Cochabamba	Teatro José María de Achá		1864		

=== Brazil ===
Location	Venue	Room	Date built	Seats	Resident organizations
Belém	Teatro da Paz		1878	912	Teatro da Paz Symphony Orchestra
Belo Horizonte	Palácio das Artes	Grande Teatro	1971	1,692	Minas Gerais State Symphony Orchestra
Belo Horizonte	Sala Minas Gerais		2015	1,477	Orquestra Filarmônica de Minas Gerais
Brasília	Teatro Nacional		1966	1,315	Teatro Nacional Symphony Orchestra
Curitiba	Teatro Guaíra	Bento Munhoz da Rocha Netto Auditorium	1974	2,173	Paraná Symphony Orchestra, Ballet Teatro Guaíra
Fortaleza	Teatro José de Alencar		1910	794	
Juiz de Fora	Teatro do Centro Cultural Pró-Música		1974	500	
Juiz de Fora	Cine-Theatro Central		1929	1,881	
Manaus	Teatro Amazonas		1896	701	
Pelotas	Teatro Guarani		1921	929	
Porto Alegre	Teatro da OSPA		1984	1,230	Porto Alegre Symphony Orchestra,
Porto Alegre	Teatro São Pedro		1858	736	
Recife	Teatro de Santa Isabel		1850	860	Recife Symphony Orchestra, Brazil's oldest symphony orchestra
Ribeirão Preto	Teatro Pedro II		1930	1,588	
Rio de Janeiro	Cidade das Artes		2008	1,800	Brazilian Symphony Orchestra
Rio de Janeiro	Theatro Municipal		1909	2,361	Foundation Theatro Municipal Theatro Municipal Symphony Orchestra Theatro Municipal Symphonic Choir
Rio de Janeiro	Sala Cecília Meireles		1965	835	
Salvador	Teatro Castro Alves	Sala Principal	1967	1,554	Bahia Symphony Orchestra, Ballet Teatro Castro Alves
São Luís	Teatro Arthur Azevedo		1817	750	
São Paulo	Sala São Paulo		1999	1,500	São Paulo State Symphony Orchestra
São Paulo	Theatro Municipal (São Paulo)		1911	1,596	São Paulo City Symphony Orchestra
São Paulo	Theatro São Pedro		1917	736	São Paulo State Youth Symphony Orchestra
São Paulo	Teatro Sergio Cardoso	Sala Sergio Cardoso		864	São Paulo State Symphony Band

=== Chile ===
Location	Venue	Room	Date built	Seats	Resident organizations
Frutillar	Teatro del Lago	Espacio Volcán Tronador – Sala Nestlé	2010	1,178	Escuela de las artes Teatro del Lago
Frutillar	Teatro del Lago	Amphitheatre	2010	270	
Santiago	Teatro Municipal de Santiago de Chile	La Sala Principal	1857	1,500	Orquesta Filarmonica de Santiago, Ballet de Santiago, Coro del Teatro Municipal

=== Colombia ===
Location	Venue	Room	Date built	Seats	Resident organizations
Bogotá	es:Teatro de Cristóbal Colón	Sala Principal	1885	908	National Symphony Orchestra of Colombia
Bogotá	Teatro Municipal Jorge Eliecer Gaitan		1971	1,745	
Bogotá	Centro Cultural Julio Mario Santo Domingo	Teatro Mayor	2010	1,332	
Bogotá	Luís Ángel Arango Library	Concert Hall	1966	367	
Bogotá	National University of Colombia	es:Auditorio León de Greiff	1973	1,700	Bogotá Philharmonic
Bogotá	Teatro COLSUBSIDIO Roberto Arias Perez	Sala Principal	1983	1,000	
Bogotá	Teatro de Bellas Artes de Bogotá				
Cali	Municipal Theatre	Sala Principal	1929		
Cartagena	Teatro Heredia Adolfo Mejía		1905	650	
Medellín	Medellín Metropolitan Theatre		1987	1,634	Medellín Philharmonic Orchestra

=== Ecuador ===
Location	Venue	Room	Date built	Seats	Resident organizations
Quito	Casa de la Música Gi & Hans Neustätter	Concert Hall	2005	700	Fundación Filarmónica Casa de la Música

=== Peru ===
Location	Venue	Room	Date built	Seats	Resident organizations
Lima	Teatro Manuel Ascencio Segura		1909	796	Ballet Municipal de Lima
Lima	Teatro Peruano Japones			1,025	
Lima	Teatro Municipal de Lima		1920	1,314	
Lima	Gran Teatro Nacional		2012	1,500	

=== Uruguay ===
Location	Venue	Room	Date built	Seats	Resident organizations
Montevideo	Sodre National Auditorium	Sala Eduardo Fabini	1905	2,000	Ballet Nacional del Sodre; Coro del Sodre; Orquesta Sinfónica del Sodre; Conjunto de Música de Cámara del Sodre
Montevideo	Teatro Solís	Sala Principal	1856	1,500	Comedia Nacional, Orquesta Filarmónica de Montevideo
Montevideo	Teatro Solís	Sala Zavala Muniz		284	

=== Venezuela ===
Location	Venue	Room	Date built	Seats	Resident organizations
Caracas	Teresa Carreño Cultural Complex	Sala Ríos Reyna	1983	2,367	Venezuela Symphony Orchestra; Coro de Ópera Teresa Carreño; Ballet del Teresa Carreño
Caracas	Teresa Carreño Cultural Complex	Sala José Felix Ribas	1976	347	Orquesta Filarmónica Nacional de Venezuela
Caracas	Central University of Venezuela	Aula Magna	1953	2,700	
Caracas	Central University of Venezuela	Concert Hall	1954	400	
Caracas	Centro de Acción Social para la Música	Sala Simón Bolívar	2011	1,100	Simón Bolívar Symphony Orchestra
Caracas	Centro de Acción Social para la Música	Sala Fedora Alemán	2011	400	
Caracas	Teatro Municipal de Caracas	Main Hall	1881	1,200	Orquesta Sinfónica Municipal de Caracas
Caracas	Teatro Nacional	Main Hall	1905	797	
Maracaibo	Baralt Theater	Main Hall	1883	683	Orquesta Sinfónica del Zulia
Maracaibo	Teatro Bellas Artes	Main Hall	1964	620	Orquesta Sinfónica de Maracaibo
Valencia	Teatro Municipal de Valencia	Main Hall	1894	647	Orquesta Sinfónica de Carabobo
Valencia	University of Carabobo	Aula Magna	2014	2,515	
Barquisimeto	Teatro Juárez	Main Hall	1905	708	Orquesta Sinfónica de Lara
Maracay	Teatro de la Ópera	Main Hall	1973	860	Orquesta Sinfónica de Aragua
Mérida	Centro Cultural Tulio Febres-Cordero	Sala Febres Cordero	1994	1,168	Orquesta Sinfónica de Mérida

== Industry associations ==
- International Association of Venue Managers
- World Council for Venue Management

== See also ==
- Big Five (orchestras)
- Architectural acoustics
- Lists of buildings and structures
- List of music venues
- List of contemporary amphitheatres
- List of jazz venues
- List of opera houses
- List of symphony orchestras
- Noise control
