= Eugene Concert Choir =

Choral masterworks organization

- Origin: Eugene, Oregon, USA
- Genre: Classical
- Years active: 1975–present
- Website: www.eugeneconcertchoir.org

Eugene Concert Choir is a choral masterworks organization in Eugene, Oregon, that consists of three performing ensembles: the 100-voice Eugene Concert Choir (ECC), the 36-voice chamber choir Eugene Vocal Arts (EVA), and the associated professional chamber orchestra Eugene Concert Orchestra.

== Description ==
Described from its beginnings in the 1980s by the Eugene Register Guard as "Community enterprise at its best," the organization is a resident company of the Hult Center for the Performing Arts, which is the primary performance venue for the choirs. Eugene Vocal Arts also occasionally performs at The University of Oregon's Beall Concert Hall. Community and educational outreach is an important element in the organization and the Eugene Concert Choir Outreach program (EdOp) annually reaches 1,000+ children through in-school presentations. Diane Retallack has been the artistic director and conductor since 1985.

The Eugene Concert Choir organization is a 501(c)(3) non-profit organization governed by a board of directors, and its mission is "to engage, inspire and enrich the community through performance of choral masterworks, diverse artistic experiences, and educational outreach." Touring choirs from the organization have performed internationally numerous times including concerts in Australia, China, Europe, Puerto Rico; and at the historic Carnegie Hall in New York City.

The Eugene Concert Choir, Eugene Vocal Arts, and Eugene Concert Symphony hold auditions every fall, with their performance season typically running from November - May.

== Repertoire ==
=== Eugene Concert Choir ===
The Eugene Concert Choir is a mixed-voice adult volunteer chorus which focuses on performing choral masterworks. Highlights of past masterworks performances include:

- Ludwig van Beethoven: Missa Solemnis, Op.; Mass in C, Op.
- Hector Berlioz: Requiem, Op.
- Johannes Brahms: Ein Deutsches Requiem, Op.; Schicksalslied, Op.
- Benjamin Britten: War Requiem, Op.
- Anton Bruckner: E Minor Mass, Op.
- Antonio Estévez: Cantata Criolla
- Gabriel Fauré: Requiem, Op.
- Charles Gounod: St. Cecilia Mass, Op.
- G. F. Handel: Messiah, Op.; Dettingen Te Deum, Op.
- Franz Joseph Haydn: The Creation, Lord Nelson Mass, Mass in Time of War
- Zoltan Kodaly: Te Deum, Op.
- Kuljeric: Missa, Op.
- Felix Mendelssohn: Die erste Walpurgisnacht, Op.(In collaboration with the Eugene Ballet)
- W. A. Mozart: Requiem, Op.; Grand Mass in C Minor, Op.; Vespers, Op. (date); Coronation Mass, Op.
- Carl Orff: Carmina Burana, Op.(In collaboration with the Eugene Ballet)
- Giacomo Puccini: Messa di Gloria, Op.
- Ariel Ramirez: Misa Criolla
- Igor Stravinsky: A Symphony of Psalms, Op., Les Noces, Op. (In collaboration with the Eugene Ballet)
- Ralph Vaughan Williams: Dona Nobis Pacem, Op.

The Eugene Concert Choir has performed numerous smaller works and excerpts of major works, and the complete opera, Amahl and the Night Visitors by Gian Carlo Menotti (date).

The Eugene Concert Choir also lightens the concert season by presenting more popular fare. Past performances have included shows titled American Style, The Big Bands Era, Hot Latin Nights, The British Invasion, The Best of Broadway, and Jazz, Gospel & Motown. These popular presentations were original musical revues created by Artistic Director Diane Retallack. The first of these popular creations was 20th Century America in Revue, inspired by a review of music in America for the millennium celebration in the year 2000. The most ambitious original creation was a fully staged musical, A Dickens of a Christmas, based on Charles Dickens’ A Christmas Carol, performed at the Hult Center in 2015 and reprised in December 2018. Diane Retallack joined with DJ Prashant Kakad for the collaborative creation of an original musical titled A Bollywood Dream, performed by the Eugene Concert Choir and Prashant Kakad’s organization Bollywood Dreams in April 2018.

=== Eugene Vocal Arts ===
Eugene Vocal Arts performs works appropriate for a select chamber choir, from the Renaissance to the present. Recent repertoire has included an element of social significance. Eugene Vocal Arts performed the world premiere of the commissioned work Shadow and Light; An Alzheimer’s Journey in 16 Movements by Oregon composer Joan Szymko in April 2016. Their spring concert in 2019, The Peace of Wild Things, focused on contemporary choral music to heighten awareness of our precious natural world and reflect on what “Earth Day” means to us and to future generations. The 2019–2020 season will include The Unarmed Child, composer Michael Bussewitz-Quarm's response to gun violence against children, and a concert titled In Celebration of Women, to mark the 100th anniversary of women's right to vote.

From 1990 to 1999, the Eugene Vocal Arts ensemble presented English Madrigal Dinners in elaborate Elizabethan attire. They revived the English Madrigal Dinner in date --, later moving the event to the spring for a MayFest dinner for two years. The Ensemble continues to perform Renaissance repertoire in authentic Elizabethan dress in concert presentations.

Works performed with orchestra include:

- C. P. E. Bach: Magnificat
- J. S. Bach: Lobet den Herrn
- G. F. Handel: Dettingen te Deum; Dixit Dominus
- F. J. Haydn: St. Cecilia; Lord Nelson Mass
- Franz Schubert: Mass in A-flat
- Joan Szymko: Shadow and Light
- Antonio Vivaldi: Gloria; Magnificat

=== Eugene Concert Orchestra ===
The Eugene Concert Orchestra, the professional orchestra of the Eugene Concert Choir organization, has primarily assisted the Eugene Vocal Arts and the Eugene Concert Choir in the choral-orchestral works performed with the organization from its debut concert in fall of 2015 with the Haydn St. Cecilia Mass. Occasionally the orchestra is featured in orchestral repertoire alone and has performed the Albinoni Adagio and Pachelbel's Canon.

== History ==
The Eugene Concert Choir was founded as the Eugene Community Chorus under the direction of Philip Bayles, who brought the singers together for a read-through of Handel's Messiah in April 1974. The singers organized themselves into a continuing ensemble, elected officers, and continued to perform with Philip Bayles as their director and conductor through the 1981–82 season. Paul Westlund was hired as artistic director for the 1982–83 season, and Peter Jermihov became director for the following two seasons.

Diane Retallack was hired as artistic director and conductor at the start of the 1985–86 season and has continued in that position to the present. In 1986, she founded the Eugene Vocal Arts Ensemble (frequently referred to as simply Eugene Vocal Arts) as a chamber choir within the Eugene Concert Choir organization. At the start of Retallack's tenure, the Eugene Concert Choir hired the Oregon Mozart Players to be their partner orchestra for most of their concerts, occasionally hiring the Eugene Symphony Orchestra for larger works.

The Eugene Concert Orchestra was formed in 2015 as a part of the Eugene Concert Choir organization in response to the needs for the Shadow and Light recording project, and has continued as the orchestra of the organization, performing with both choirs.

The Eugene Concert Choir commissioned a choral masterwork entitled Shadow and Light: An Alzheimer's Journey in 16 Movements by Portland composer Joan Szymko. The premiere performances were April 6 and 8, 2016 by the Eugene Vocal Arts and the newly formed Eugene Concert Orchestra, three soloists and speaker. The recording of Shadow and Light was awarded the American Prize Ernst Bacon Award for Recorded Music, Community Division, in 2016. The video documentary by AO Films entitled The Story of Shadow and Light: Giving Voice to an Alzheimer's Journey won Best Documentary in the 2017 Oregon Independent Film Festival.

On May 7, 2023 Eugene Concert Choir partnered with guest choir EXIGENCE (a Sphinx Vocal Ensemble) to present Black is Beautiful with guest artistic director Dr. Eugene Rogers, celebrating black culture, history, and the memorializing victims of racial violence, based around Joel Thompson's Last Words of the Unarmed, modeled after Haydn's The Seven Last Words of Christ, with each movement quoting the last words of seven unarmed African-American men killed by police or authority figures – Kenneth Chamberlain, Oscar Grant, Trayvon Martin, John Crawford, Amadou Diallo, and Eric Garner. Other selections for the performance included Glory from the film Selma, Scenes From the Life of a Martyr by Undine Smith Moore – a 16-part oratorio about the life of Dr. Martin Luther King Jr., and the world premiere of The Hymn! by Stacey V. Gibbs. Inspired from the global reaction to the murder of George Floyd in 2020, the event also included a community forum. The performance featured soloists Elaine Alvarez (soprano), Rehanna Thelwell (mezzo), Demetrius Sampson Jr. (tenor), and Marques Jerrell Ruff (bass). The concert was recorded and later released as a CD.

== Personnel ==
- Artistic and executive director: Diane Retallack
- Marketing and communications director: Kurt Liedtke
- Music education director: Jill Switzer
- Orchestra and personnel manager: Olivia Davis
- Accounting: Christina Lay

The organization is also served by a board of directors and many volunteers.

== Discography ==
- Holiday Joy, a collection of Christmas songs, as well as excerpts from Handel's Messiah
- American Spirit, an exploration of the wide variety of musical styles of 20th-century composers and arrangers from North America
- A Celtic Christmas, featuring Benjamin Britten's A Ceremony of Carols along with Celtic Christmas songs performed with the Willis Clan
- Shadow and Light, a masterwork commissioned by the Eugene Concert Choir, composed by Joan Szymko and performed by Eugene Vocal Arts and Eugene Concert Orchestra. This work gives voice to the challenges, courage and loving acceptance of people affected by Alzheimer's and other forms of dementia. The DVD/CD set includes the concert and video documentary DVD as well as the audio recording CD of Shadow and Light.
- Black is Beauutiful (Navona Records), performed live by the Eugene Concert Choir with EXIGENCE: A Sphinx Vocal Ensemble on Sunday, May 7, 2023 at the Hult Center in Eugene, OR. The concert celebrated black culture and history while memorializing victims of racially-charged violence. The performance included the complete Seven Last Words of the Unarmed by Joel Thompson, the complete Scenes From the Life of a Martyr by Undine Smith Moore, and various selections, including the world premiere of The Hymn! by Stacey V. Gibbs, and Glory from the film Selma.
