= Ballet Fantastique =

501(c)3 nonprofit, chamber ballet company based in Eugene, Oregon, US

- Industry: Ballet, Performance Dance, Dance Education
- Founded: 2000
- Headquarters: Eugene, Oregon, U.S.
- Area served: Pacific Northwest
- Key people: Donna Marisa Bontrager and Hannah Bontrager
- Website: www.balletfantastique.org

Ballet Fantastique is an American contemporary ballet company and nonprofit performing arts organization based in Eugene, Oregon. Founded in 2000, the company creates and presents original narrative dance theater works blending ballet, live music, and cross-disciplinary collaboration. Ballet Fantastique is a resident company at the Hult Center for the Performing Arts and presents annual seasons locally while touring throughout the Pacific Northwest and internationally.

== History ==
Ballet Fantastique was established in 2000 by choreographer-producers and dancers, Donna and Hannah Bontrager. The organization became an Oregon nonprofit in the early 2000s and later achieved 501(c)(3) status. Its mission is to build new audiences for dance through original ballet works, provide professional training for emerging artists, and engage youth through arts education. Since its founding, Ballet Fantastique has presented more than 100 original works, including over 50 full-length narrative ballet premieres.

Based in downtown Eugene, Oregon, the company has received regional and national media attention. The Washington Post has featured Ballet Fantastique, while Eugene Weekly described it as a "bold, cross-disciplinary dance company. According to Portland Center Stage Reviews, Ballet Fantastique has "made a name for itself in out-of-the-box revisions of classic story ballets" and is "not your grandmother's Swan Lake." In recent years, Ballet Fantastique productions have been recognized with media attention and awards nominations, including regional Emmy nomination coverage in press releases.

Ballet Fantastique productions emphasize collaboration with live musicians, visual artists, and other cross-disciplinary performers. Notable collaborations include work with Michelle Ladd Williams (Lord of the Rings and Recognized Fight Director, Society of American Fight Directors) for the world premiere of Ballet Fantastique's Robin Hood & Maid Marian in 2023.

The company regularly holds auditions and attracts dancers from across the United States and internationally.

== Outreach and education ==
Ballet Fantastique's outreach initiatives are designed to increase access to dance education and performance for diverse communities throughout Lane County and the surrounding region. Programs include need-based scholarships for Academy students, integrated arts residencies in public and private schools, and community performances that bring professional dance to nontraditional venues. The organization also provides free or reduced-cost tickets for youth audiences and school groups, with the goal of introducing young people to live performing arts. Through these initiatives, Ballet Fantastique seeks to broaden participation in ballet and engage audiences beyond traditional concert-going communities.

== Academy of Ballet Fantastique ==
The Academy of Ballet Fantastique is the official training school of Ballet Fantastique, offering year-round dance instruction for children, adults, and aspiring professional artists ages 12 months and up. The Academy provides structured programs focused on technical development, artistic growth, and performance experience.

In the Professional Training Division, dancers age 9 and up study the Vaganova Method of training in limited class sizes of 12 students or fewer. Students participate in professional performances with the company, and may audition for company positions and apprenticeships upon graduation. Academy of Ballet Fantastique coaches are experienced in the Vaganova method of training as well as in pedagogy and professional performance.

The Young Dancer Program at The Academy of Ballet Fantastique is for dancers ages 12 months and up, and follows a progressive training approach, introducing young children to creative movement, music education, and dance fundamentals.

== Company repertoire ==
Ballet Fantastique performs all-original repertoire created in house in collaboration with a wide range of multi-disciplinary artistic collaborators. Selected list of new works created and premiered by Donna and Hannah Bontrager, Resident Choreographer-Producers for Ballet Fantastique:

Title	Basis	Description	Music	Premiere	Ref
Little Mermaid: The 80's Pop Ballet		Two acts	Neon Revival (LA): (JP Durand, Guitar, Tita Hutchison, Vocals, Liza Carbé, Bass, Tim Curle, Percussion	Feb 28–Mar 1, 2026	
Murder at the Ballet		Two acts	Grammy-winning Juan Luqui in his first-ever ballet score	Oct 24–27, 2024	
Robin Hood & Maid Marian		Two acts	Nottingham, composed by Liza Carbé for Ballet Fantastique (premiere)	May 11–14, 2023	
Arrivals: Rio		Two acts	Bossanaire and Juan Cruz Luqui (premiere), performing original music and music by Argentine composer Gustavo Santaolalla	Dec. 31, 2021, Jan. 2, 2022	
Nevermore: Stories of Edgar Allan Poe		Two acts	Liz Dorman, Dale Bradley, Sergei Teleshev play the music of YouTube celebrity composers Peter Gundry and Lucas King	Oct. 25–27, 2019	
Cleopatra: The Ballet		Two acts	Beats Antique	May 9–12, 2019	
Babes in Toyland	Babes in Toyland (operetta)	Two acts	Swing Shift Jazz Orchestra play Duke Ellington's jazz Nutcracker score	Dec. 10–12, 2018	
Alice in Wonderland		Two acts	High Step Society (electro-swing band, represented by Gravitas Recordings)	May 11–13, 2018	
The Legend of Sleepy Hollow		Two acts	Dreos + Gerry Rempel Ensemble	Oct. 27–29, 2017	
Aladdin: A Rock Opera Ballet		Two acts	Satin Love Orchestra	May 12–14, 2017	
Crouching Tiger Hidden Dragon		Two acts	DaXun Zhang + Oregon Mozart Players under Music Director Kelly Kuo	Mar. 3–5, 2017	
Scarlet Flower: Beauty and the Beast Retold	The Scarlet Flower	Two acts	Trio Voronezh	May 6–8, 2016	
Dragon & the Night Queen: Celtic Stories		Two acts	Gerry Rempel Ensemble with Eliot Grasso	Feb. 26–28, 2016	
The Odyssey: The Ballet	The Odyssey	Two acts	Original live looping violin, Cullen Vance	Feb. 27-Mar. 1, 2015	
An American Christmas Carol	A Christmas Carol	Two acts	Halie Loren, singing original arrangements of 1940s holiday jazz standards	Dec. 12–14, 2014	
The Book of Esther: A Rock Gospel Ballet	Book of Esther	Two acts	Gospel classics, arranged and performed live by Andiel Brown + the UO Gospel Singers	May 9–11, 2014	
Tales from the Floating World		Two acts	Original music by Portland Taiko and Mitsuki Dazai	Feb. 7–9, 2014	
Zorro: The Ballet		Two acts	Original music by LA-based Latin world guitar fusion band Incendio and violinist Kim Angelis (premiere)	Oct. 17–19, 2013	
Pride and Prejudice: A Parisian Jazz Ballet	Pride and Prejudice	Two acts	Gerry Rempel Jazz Syndicate	May 4–5, 2013	
(The Misadventures of) Casanova		Two acts	Antonio Vivaldi, Jean-Philippe Rameau, Jean-Baptiste de Lully, Johann Sebastian Bach	Feb. 2–3, 2013	
Cirque de la Lune		Two acts	Original music, played live by Betty & the Boy, Troupe Carnivale, and Mood Area 52	Oct. 20–21, 2012	
Cinderella: A Rock Opera Ballet		Two acts	1960s Billboard hits, arranged and played live by Shelley & Cal James and the Agents of Unity Band	May 12–13, 2012	
Arabian Nights		Two acts	Traditional, with narrations performed by Deepti Khedekar	Jan. 28, 2012	
"Tango Para Abel," "St. Margaret's Tears," "Illumination," "Misterioso," "Magie Noire," "Viheula," "Jaco y Paco"		Two acts	Original music, written and performed live by Incendio, the Latin world guitar fusion band from LA	Oct. 22, 2011	
Shakespeare's As You Like It: A Wild West Ballet		Two acts with silent film prologue	Aaron Copland, Hershy Kay, George Gershwin, Jacques Offenbach, Leroy Anderson, John Philip Sousa, Ferde Grofé, traditional saloon music, and original compositions for honkytonk piano by Jeremy DeKyle Schropp	Apr. 16, 2011	
"Sunday Table"			Pink Martini	Jan. 29, 2011	
"Gaucho, De Ushuaia a la Quiaca, Pampa"			Gustavo Santaolalla	Jan. 29, 2011	
"Jongo No. 3 Suite Brasileira"			Lorenzo Fernandez	Jan. 29, 2011	
"Cinquenta Anos de Soledad"			Original score by NW composer Charles Gurke (premiere)	Jan. 29, 2011	
"Dime Amor"			Enrique Cardenas, arranged and performed live by Jessie Marquez	Jan. 29, 2011	
"Folk Suite"			Traditional Irish and Celtic folk medleys	Nov. 20–21, 2011	
"Desperation, Obsession, Passion"			John Corigliano, music from The Red Violin	Nov. 20–21, 2011	
"Bulgarska Tantsova Suita"			Original score Jeremy DeKyle Schropp (premiere)	Nov. 20–21, 2011	
Tales of Beatrix Potter		One act	John Lanchbery	Apr. 30, 2010	
Love at the Cafe Terrace		One act	Original score (world premiere) by composer Jeremy DeKyle Schropp	2009	
"Pourquoi me Reveiller," "Je Crois Entendre Encore," "Song to the Moon," "Apres un Reve"			Jules Massenet, from the opera Werther; Georges Bizet, from the opera The Pearl Fishers; Antonín Dvořák, from the opera Rusalka; Gabriel Fauré	2009	
"Lagrima," "Adelita"			Guitar meditations arranged and played live by classical guitarist John Jarvie	2009	
"Argentinian Dance," "Besame Mucho," "Russian Ragtime," "Waltz for Nicky," "Strauss Polka," "NY Tango"			Original arrangements and new work arranged and played live by Trio Voronezh	2009	
Breakfast at Tiffany's		one-act suite of dances	Henry Mancini	2009	
Carnival of the Animals		one-act suite of variations	Camille Saint-Saëns, played live by Eugene Symphony	2008	
Four Novelettes		one-act suite	Samuel Coleridge-Taylor, played live by Oregon Mozart Players	2008	
Daphnis et Chloé		one-act suite	Maurice Ravel	2008	
"La Soledad," "Brazil"			Pink Martini	2008	
"La Musica Notturna Delle Strade Di Madrid No. 6, Op. 30"			Luigi Boccherini	2007	
Goldilocks & the Three Bears		(suite of dances)	Ferdinand Hérold, John Lanchbery	2005	
Madama Butterfly	Madama Butterfly		Giacomo Puccini	2005	
The Cakewalk Ballet		Two acts	Louis Moreau Gottschalk, Hershy Kay	2005	
"Casta Diva"			Vincenzo Bellini (from the opera Norma)	2003	
"Water Music"			George Frideric Handel	2003	
"Chopin Waltzes"		Suite	Frédéric Chopin	2003	
