= Trio Voronezh =

Russian folk music group

Trio Voronezh is a Russian folk music band. This band, known for its conventional usage of Russian musical instruments and folk melodies, is composed of three men: Vladimir Volokhin on the domra, Sergei Teleshev on the bayan, and Valerie Petrukhin on the double-bass balalaika. Trio Voronezh is named due to its founders all being graduates of the Academy of Music in Voronezh.

== Origin ==
The trio was founded in 1993, when three young men formed a folk music trio, and began to play traditional Russian folk tunes in small concert halls in Germany, the Netherlands, and France.

== Debut ==
The band made its U.S. debut in 1996 at the Oregon Bach Festival.

Prior to their 1998 U.S. tour, Trio Voronezh made an appearance on public radio's A Prairie Home Companion with Garrison Keillor. The trio went on to perform at Houston's Society for the Performing Arts; the cities of Ann Arbor, Chicago, Portland, and St. Louis; and the Universities of Arizona, Georgia, Illinois, Nebraska, and Los Angeles, as well as Amherst, Dartmouth College, New York's Rockefeller University and Stanford.

== Recent times ==
In 2003, the trio made its debut in the orchestral persuasion with the Phoenix Symphony.

== Other collaborations ==
- In 2007, Trio Voronezh performed with Ballet Fantastique at the Hult Center in Eugene, Oregon
