= Thisted =

- Town
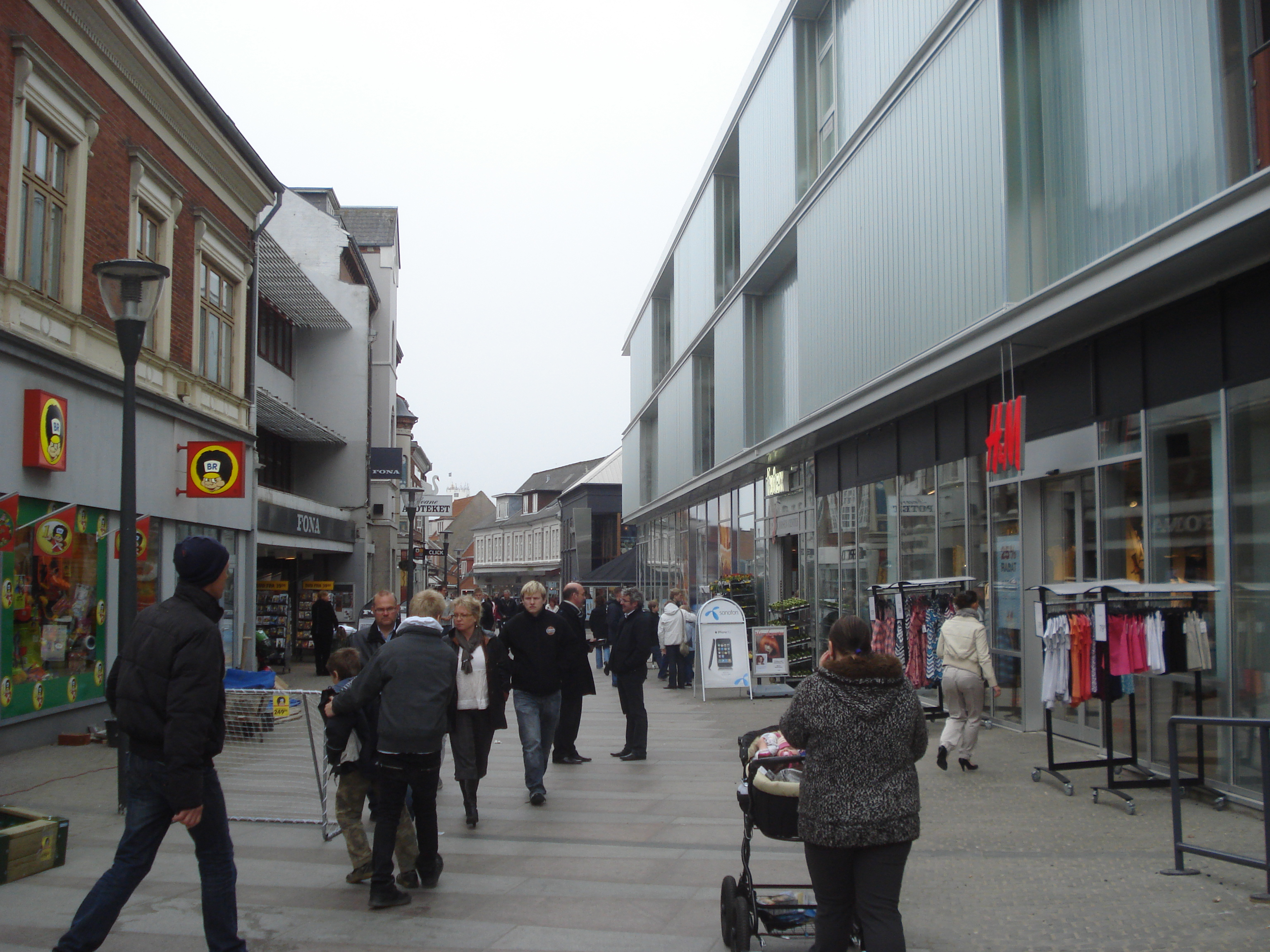
- Main pedestrian street of Thisted.

- Coat of arms

- Location in Denmark Thisted (North Jutland Region)
- Coordinates: 56°57′25″N 8°41′40″E
- Country: Denmark
- Region: North Denmark
- Municipality: Thisted
- Foundation: pre-history (unknown)
- Market town: 1500

Area
  - Urban: 8.5 km^{2} (3.3 sq mi)

Population (1 January 2026)
  - Urban: 13,535
  - Urban density: 1,600/km^{2} (4,100/sq mi)
  - Gender: 6,638 males and 6,897 females
- Demonym: Thistedbo
- Time zone: UTC+1 (CET)
  - Summer (DST): UTC+1 (CEST)
- Website: www.thisted.dk

Thisted is a town in the municipality of Thisted in the North Denmark Region of Denmark. It has a population of 13,535 (1 January 2026) and is located in Thy, in northwestern Jutland.

Market town status was given to Thisted in 1500.

== Name ==
The town's name derives from the Germanic deity Tyr and could be translated as Tyr's Stead.

== History ==
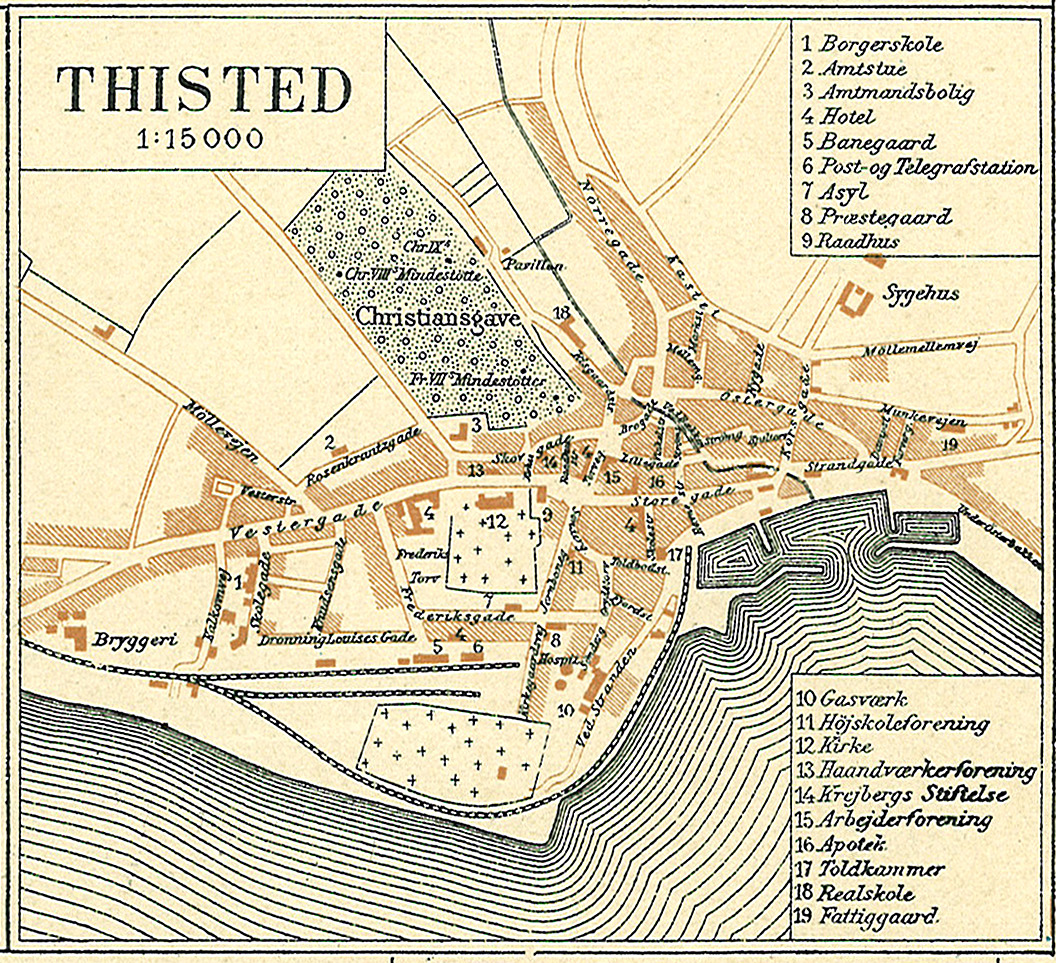
Thisted c. 1900.

During the Jutland Peasant rebellion of 1441, Christopher of Bavaria, King of Denmark, approached the rebel camp at Husby Hole near St. Jørgen's Hill in northern Jutland and sent word that anyone who left the camp and went home, would not be punished for rebellion. The men from Thisted, as well as those of Mors, left for which they were afterwards called cowards and traitors.

In 1882, Thisted was connected with the Danish rail network as the Thy railway line between Thisted and Struer opened.

== Geography ==
Thisted is located in northwestern Jutland, in the traditional district of Thy, which forms the western part of the North Jutlandic Island. It is located on the northern shore of Thisted Broad, a body of water between Thy and the island of Mors, which itself is a part of the Limfjord, a sound separating the North Jutlandic Island from the rest of the Jutland Peninsula. Thisted is located on three ridges, divided by two streams.

== Demographics ==
Thisted has a population of 13,535, of which 6,638 males and 6,897 females (1 January 2026).

== Economy ==
Thisted has a cluster of industries within food production: the Tican Slaughterhouse, Dragsbæk Maltfactory, Dragsbæk Margarinefactory, the brewery Thisted Bryghus, known for its high quality organic beer, and Premier Ice.

== Cityscape ==
=== Burial mound ===
Langdos, the largest Bronze Age burial mound in Denmark, is located in Thisted. The burial mound is 175 meters long and was built between 1800 and 1000 BC.

=== Thisted Church ===
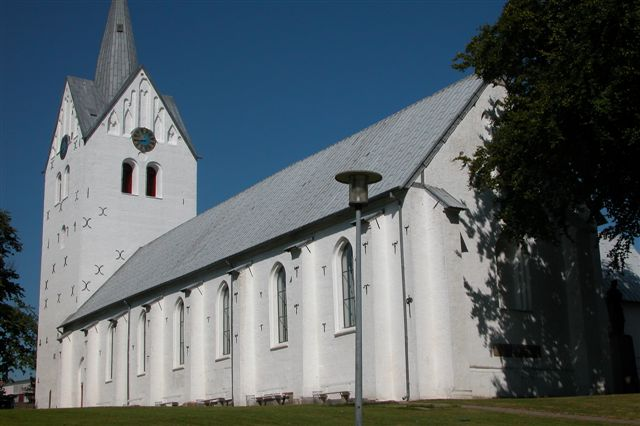
The main church of Thisted

Thisted features a Gothic-style church, Thisted Church, which replaced a smaller Romanesque-style church around 1490. The exterior of the church contains a stone with Runic inscriptions.

== Sports ==
=== Soccer ===
Thisted has a football team Thisted FC in the Danish 2nd Division (2022–2023 season).

== Infrastructure ==
=== Rail ===
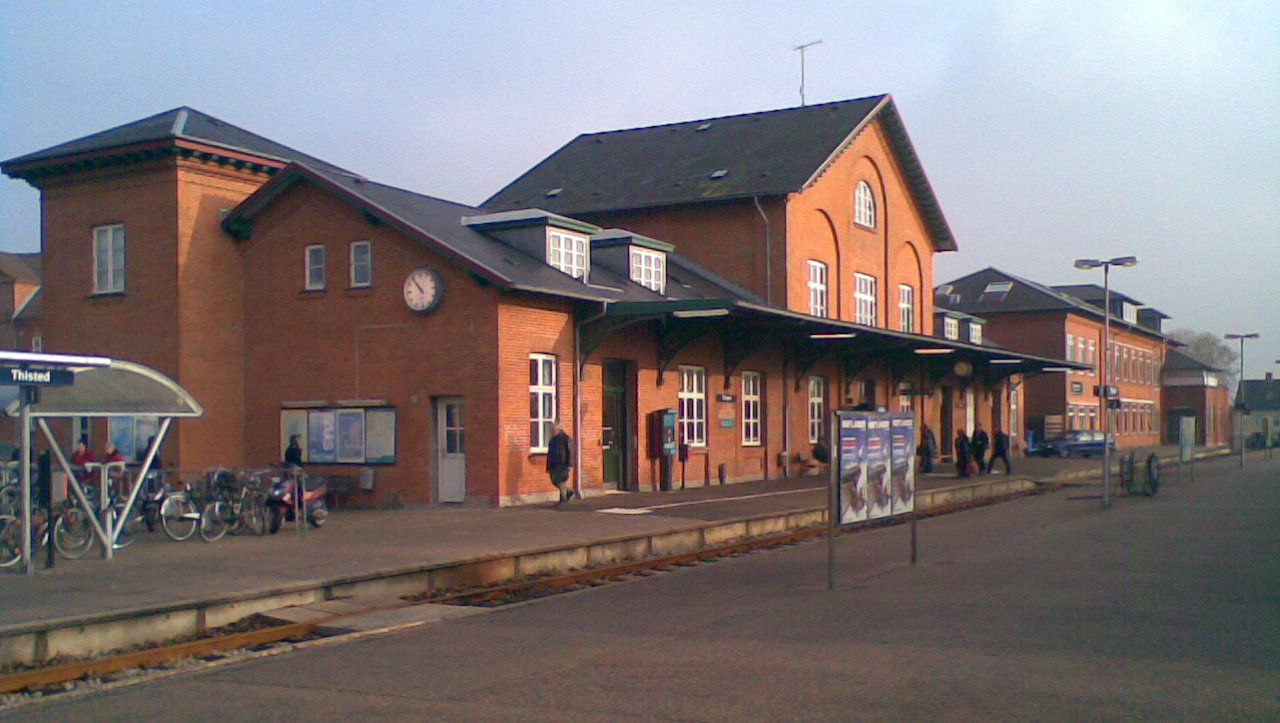
Platform facade of Thisted station.

Thisted is served by Thisted railway station which opened in 1882. It is the northern terminus of the Thy railway line which connects Thisted with Struer to the south. Thisted station offers frequent local train services to Struer station with onward connections by train from Struer to the rest of Denmark. Until 2019, it also offered direct InterCity services to Copenhagen.

=== Air ===
The small Thisted Airport (Danish: Thisted Lufthavn) is owned by Thisted municipality, and is located 15 kilometers from Thisted. The airport opened in 1970, and until 2007 serviced daily flights between Thisted and the Danish capital, Copenhagen. Today, the nearest airport from Thisted with scheduled national and international flights is Aalborg Airport c. 86 kilometres (53 mi) east of Thisted (road distance).

== Education ==
There are several educational institutions in Thisted. There are three schools, Østre skole, Rolighedskolen, and Tingstrup skole. There's also a gymnasium, Higher Preparatory Examination, Higher Commercial Examination Programme and Higher Technical Examination Programme.

== Notable people ==
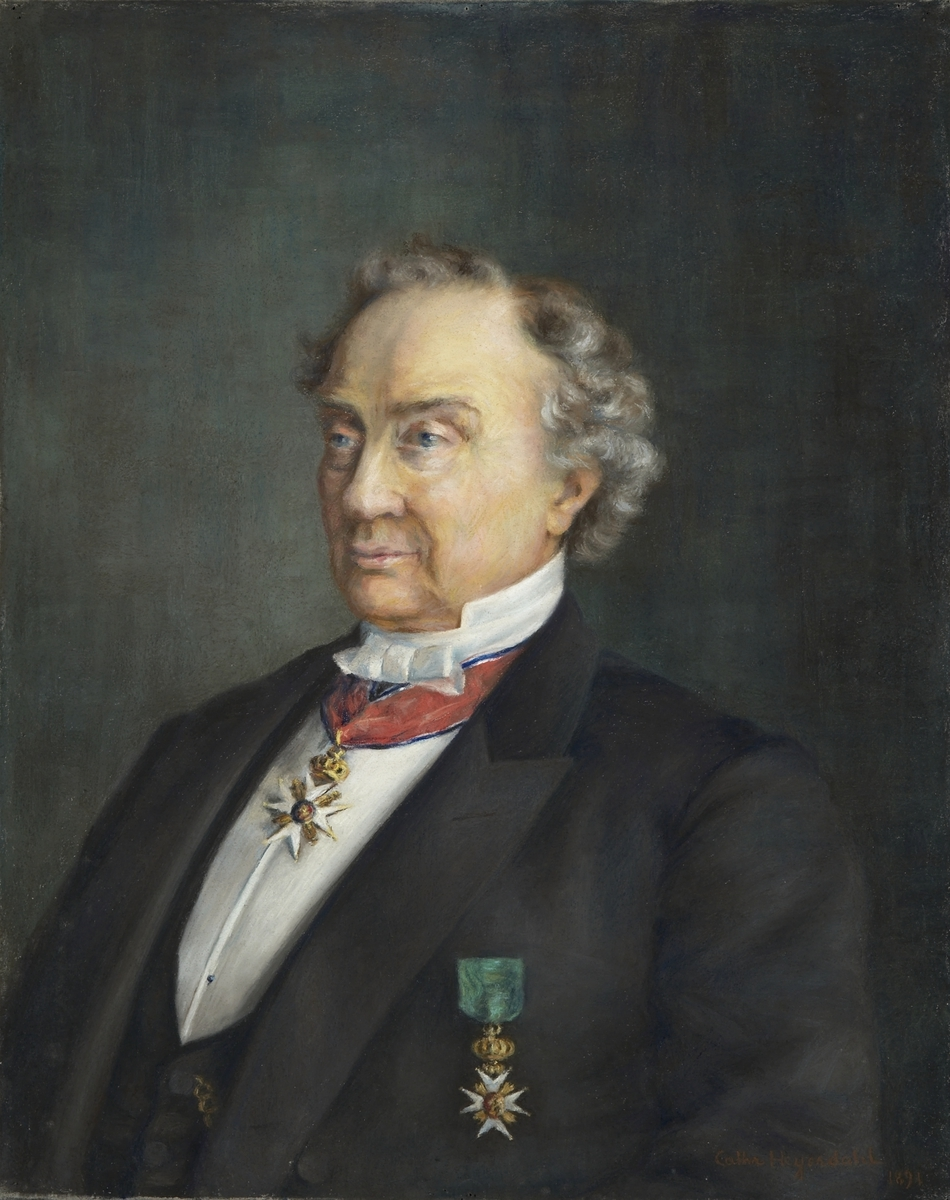
Knud Graah, 1891

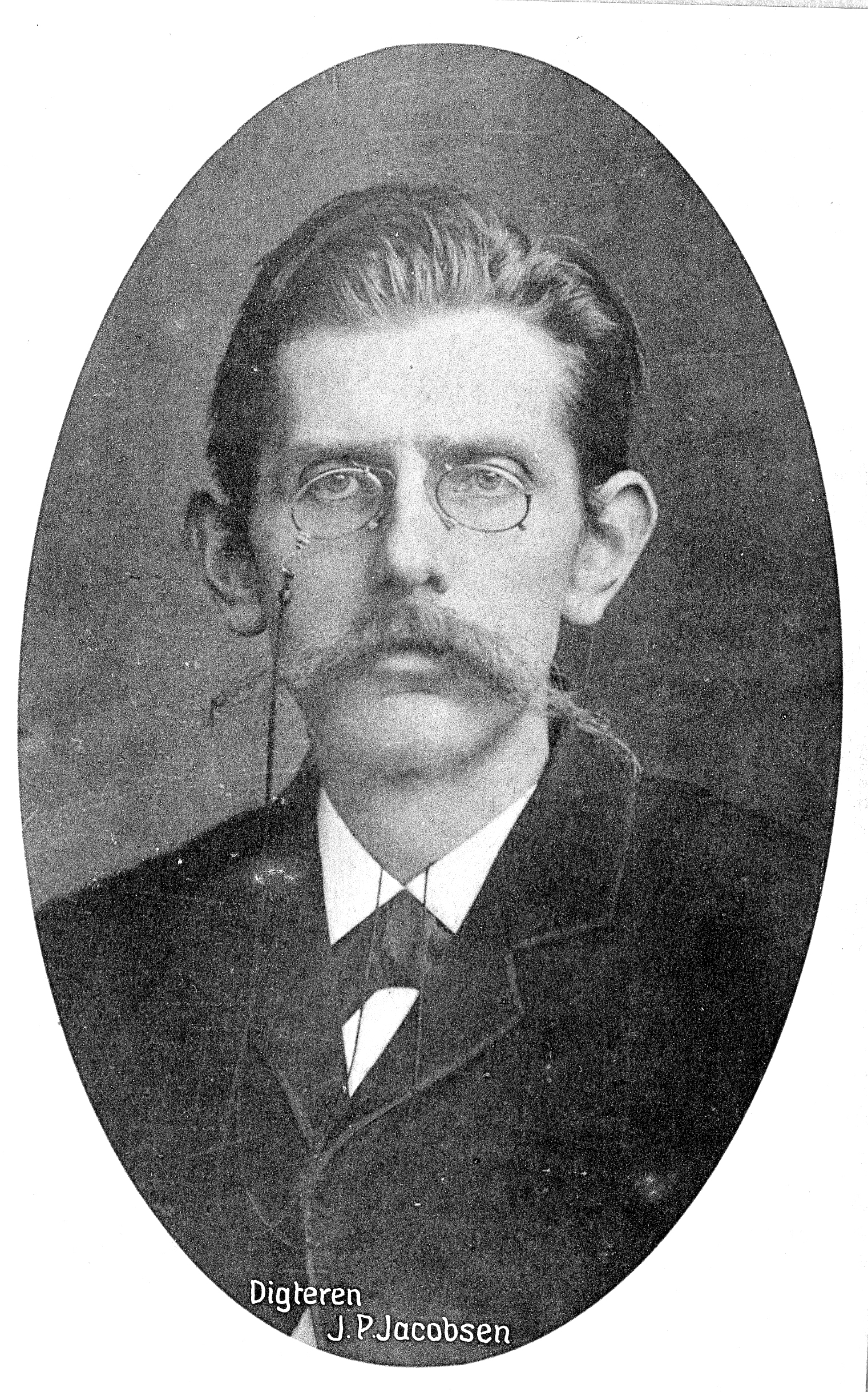
J P Jacobsen, c.1879

- Conrad Malte-Brun (1775 in Thisted – 1826) a Dano-French geographer, coined the name Oceania
- Hendrik Pontoppidan (1814 in Thisted – 1901) a Danish merchant, consul and philanthropist
- Christen Mikkelsen Kold (1816 in Thisted – 1870) a teacher, created the Danish high-school system
- Knud Graah (1817–1909) a Norwegian industrialist and pioneer in the Norwegian textile industry
- Jens Peter Jacobsen (1847 in Thisted – 1885) a Danish novelist, poet and scientist
- Peter Tom-Petersen (1861 in Thisted – 1926) a painter and graphic artist of cityscapes and interiors
- Grethe Rask (1930 in Thisted – 1977) a physician and surgeon in Zaïre, one of the first non-Africans to die of AIDS
- Yutte Stensgaard (born 1946) an actress, known for her role in Hammer's Lust for a Vampire (1971)
- Mogens Dahl (born 1953 in Thisted) a Danish conductor, founded Mogens Dahl Concert Hall
- Kato (DJ) (born 1981 in Thisted) stage name of Thomas Kato Vittrup, a DJ and music producer
- Junior Senior (active 1998–2008) a pop duo from Thisted, Denmark

=== Sport ===
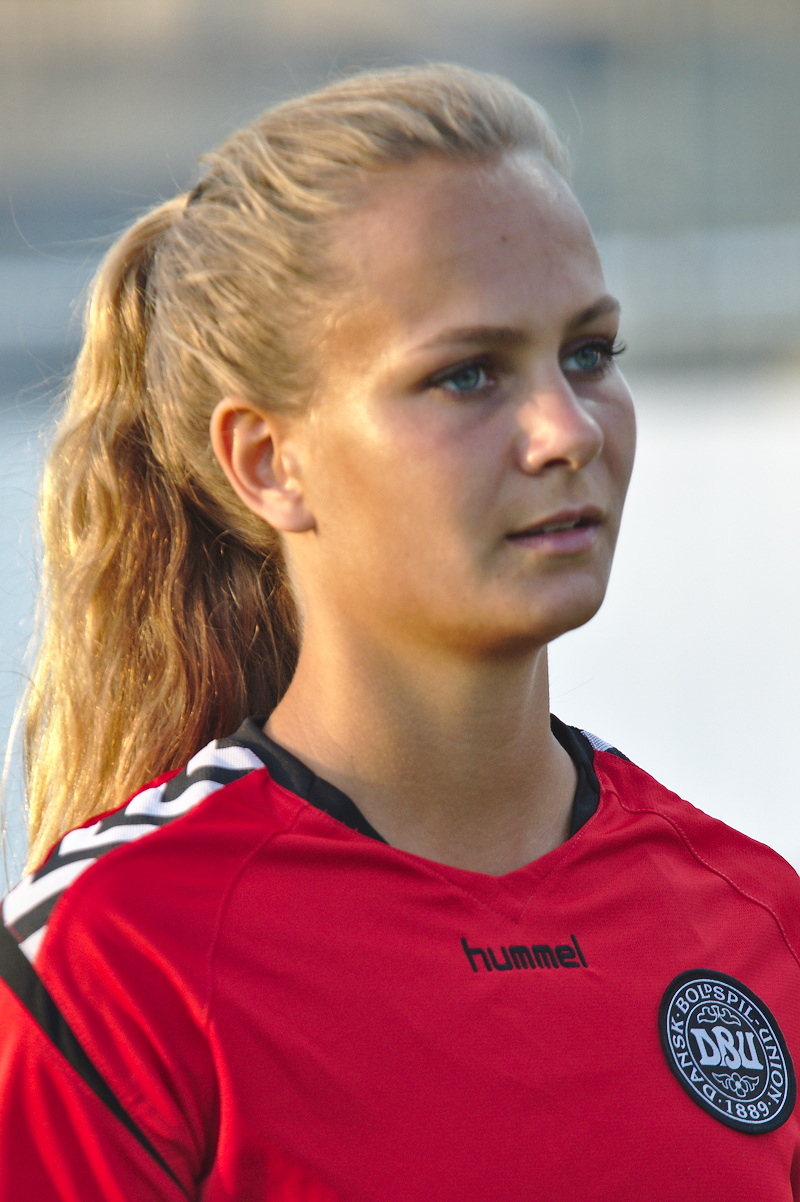
Frederikke Thøgersen, 2017

- Annette Jørgensen (born 1966 in Thisted) a swimmer, competed in the 1988 Summer Olympics
- Jesper Grønkjær (born 1977 in Nuuk, Greenland) raised in Thisted, is a former Danish professional footballer
- Mads Agesen (born 1983 in Thisted) a Danish footballer, captain at Randers FC
- Frederikke Thøgersen (born 1995 in Thisted) a Danish professional football player, plays for Fortuna Hjørring and the Denmark women's national football team
- Malthe Jakobsen (born 2003 in Thisted) a Danish racing driver

=== Emigrants to the United States ===
- Hans Ditlev Bendixsen (1842 in Thisted – 1902) (emigrated c.1865) an American shipbuilder, developed the merchant marine industry on the West Coast of the United States
- Lawrence Waldemar Tonner (1861 in Thisted – 1947) (emigrated 1870) companion and personal secretary of composer and pianist Francis Grierson for more than 40 years

== See also ==
- Østerild Wind Turbine Test Field
