= Milagro Vargas =

American mezzo-soprano (born 1955)

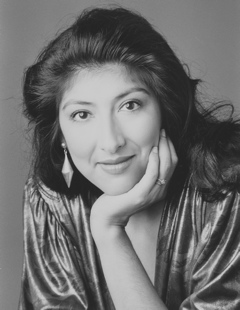
Milagro Vargas

Milagro Vargas (born June 11, 1955) is an American mezzo-soprano known for her distinctive voice and stage presence. She has appeared as an international soloist in operatic, orchestral, chamber music and recital settings.

== Family background and studies ==
Milagro Vargas was born in New York, the daughter of immigrants from Central America. She had early vocal training on scholarship at the Third Street Music Settlement with Beatrice Rippy and Lucy Shelton. She studied with Helen Hodam at Oberlin Conservatory of Music, receiving a Bachelor of Music in 1977, and with Jan DeGaetani at the Eastman School of Music, receiving a Master of Music in 1981. She had additional vocal training with Paul Sperry, Benita Valente and Anna Renyolds.

Vargas first met DeGaetani when she won a full scholarship to the Aspen Music Festival in 1973, and returned to the festival with opera fellowships in 1980-81. She was also a Marlboro Music Festival Fellow in 1982 and 1984.

== Career ==
DeGaetani would become a major influence on Vargas's singing and approach to music, leading to praise from critics for her vivid but natural performances in traditional styles, and bringing that vocalism to contemporary works.

Vargas was a soloist at the Stuttgart Opera from 1984 to 1992, and worked with conductors including Dennis Russell Davies and Bernhardt Kontarsky, and with stage directors including Götz Friedrich, Achim Freyer and Harry Kupfer. Among her many roles at Stuttgart were Nefertiti in the world premiere and recording of Akhnaten by Philip Glass, Cherubino in Mozart's Marriage of Figaro, Meg in Verdi's Falstaff, Orlovsky in Die Fledermaus by Johann Strauss, Nancy in Britten's Albert Herring, Tisbe in Rossini's ’La Cenerentola, and Stimme des Waldes in Henze's König Hirsch. She sang Charlotte in Zimmermann's Die Soldaten, and on the recording which won the Internationalen Schallplattenpreis in 1992. Kupfer brought her to the Komische Oper Berlin to sing Dorabella in Mozart's Così fan tutte. Other opera engagements include appearances at the Opera de Paris Bastille, Kirov Opera, Bolshoi Opera and the Heidelberg Schlossfestspiele.

Vargas has appeared as a soloist with many orchestras including the Philadelphia Orchestra, Los Angeles Philharmonic, Staatsorchester Stuttgart, Houston Symphony and the Orchestra of St. Luke's. Her performances with conductor Helmuth Rilling include Bach's Mass in B Minor, Beethoven's Missa Solemnis, and the Grammy Award winning recording Penderecki's Credo.

As a recitalist and chamber music vocalist Vargas has appeared with such artists as Gilbert Kalish, Walter Trampler, Eliot Fisk, Sharon Isbin, David Shifrin, David Finkle, and Wu Han.

== Personal life ==
Vargas resides with her husband Tom Manoff in Eugene, Oregon, she was a professor of voice at the University of Oregon. Among her various interests, she works for pro-diversity issues at the university and in the community.

== Discography ==
- Songs from the Trilogy: Composer: Philip Glass; Conductor, Dennis Russell Davies; Orchestra and Chorus of the Stuttgart State Opera. Sony B0000026Y7 (1989).
- Die Soldaten: Composer, Bernd Alois Zimmermann; Conductor, Bernhard Kontarsky; Orchestra and Chorus of the Stuttgart State Opera. Teldec B000009J2P (1991).
- Trinity Mass: Composer, James Yannatos; Conductor, James Yannatos; Harvard-Radcliffe Orchestra. Albany Records B0000049QW (1997).
- Credo: Composer, Krzysztof Penderecki; Conductor, Helmuth Rilling; Oregon Bach Festival Orchestra. Haenssler B000026AQA (1998).
- The Tender Land' (complete chamber version): Composer, Aaron Copland; Conductor, Murry Sidlin; Third Angle New Music Ensemble. Koch Int’l Classics B00002EPMT (1999).
- Akhnaten: Composer, Philip Glass; Conductor, Dennis Russell Davies; Orchestra and Chorus of the Stuttgart State Opera. Sony B0000A9DZX (2003).
- Satyricon: Composer, Bruno Maderna; Conductor, Sandro Gorly; Divertimento Ensemble. Disques Montaigne B0000AKOM4 (2004).
- Music of Stephen Jaffe, Vol.3: Composer, Stephen Jaffe; Conductor, Christopher Kendall; Twenty First Century Chamber Ensemble. Bridge B0017NQ9ZY (2008).
