= Wind-Rain Song =

Sculpture in Eugene, Oregon, U.S.

- The sculpture in 2015
- Artist: Weltzin Blix
- Year: 1982
- Type: Sculpture
- Medium: Bronze
- Condition: "Treatment needed" (1993)
- Location: Eugene, Oregon, United States; 44.05257°N 123.09252°W

Wind-Rain Song is an outdoor 1982 bronze sculpture by Weltzin Blix, installed at the Hult Center for the Performing Arts in Eugene, Oregon, in the United States.

== Description ==
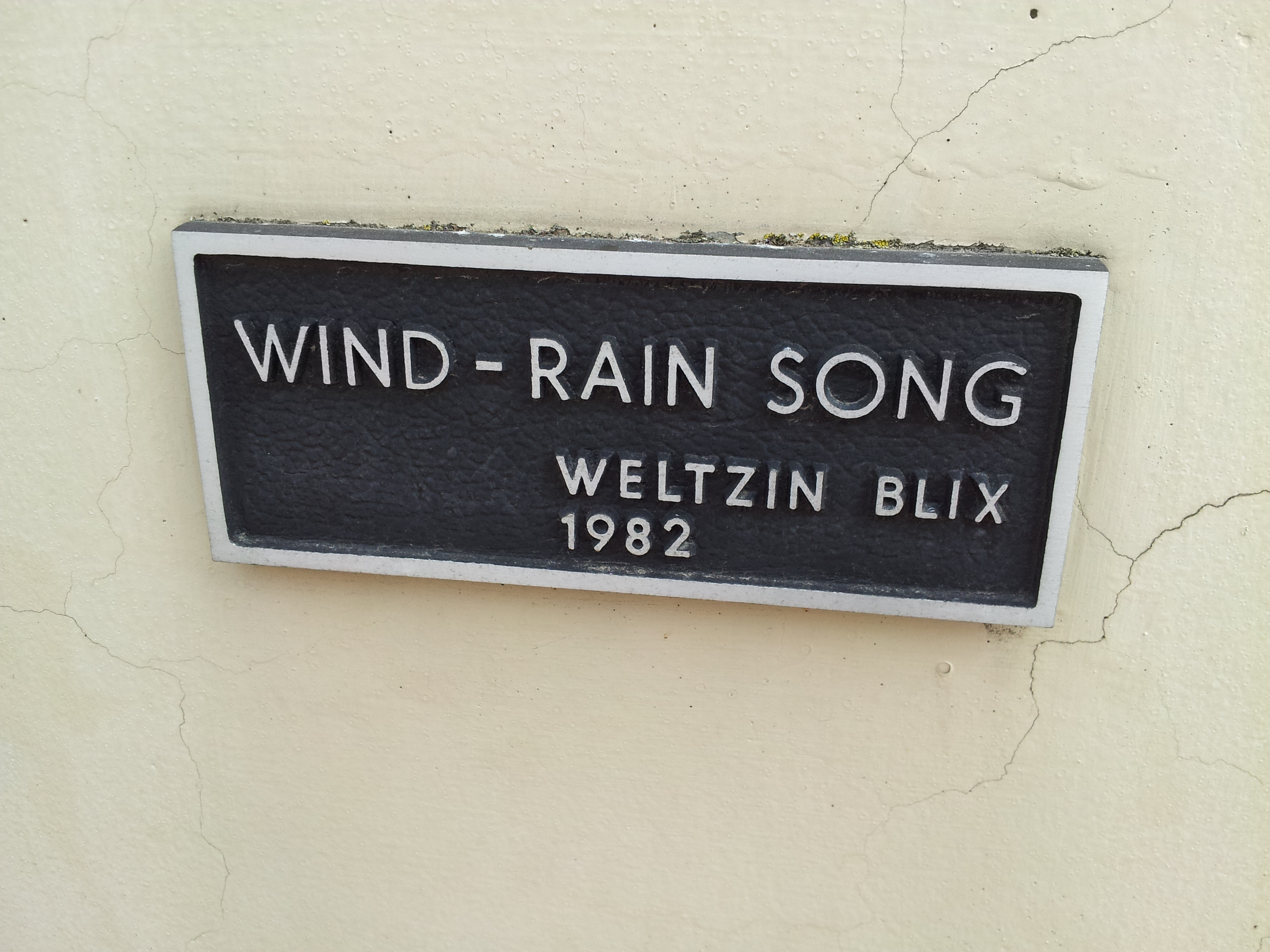
Plaque for the sculpture

Weltzin Blix's Wind-Rain Song (1982) is installed outside the Hult Center for the Performing Arts. Previously, the abstract work was installed inside the Conference Center adjacent to Hult and the Hilton Hotel. It was moved to its current site, a pedestrian plaza, seven years later. According to the Smithsonian Institution, "The artist was very pleased, and constructed a piece to add to the bottom of shaft, making the sculpture the size that he had initially envisioned when he designed it." It measures approximately 20 feet (6.1 m) x 22 feet (6.7 m), 8 inches (20 cm) x 1 foot (0.30 m), 1 inch (2.5 cm). A nearby plaque reads: WIND-RAIN SONG / WELTZIN BLIX / 1982. The sculpture was surveyed and deemed "treatment needed" by Smithsonian's "Save Outdoor Sculpture!" program in October 1993.

== See also ==
- 1982 in art
