= Bay Pointe Ballet =

Classical ballet company based in San Francisco, USA

Bay Pointe Ballet (BPB) was a classical ballet company based in South San Francisco and was led by Artistic Director Bruce Steivel. Bay Pointe Ballet's principal performance venue is the San Mateo Performing Arts Center, with tours to other cities including Reno, Nevana.

== Company ==
Bay Pointe Ballet's repertory includes Bruce Steivel's Nutcracker, Peter Pan, Coppelia, Dracula, Cycle, In The Mood, Raymonda pas de dix, and selections from A Midsummer Night's Dream among other classical repertory. The season also includes a New Works program of new ballets created by emerging and established Bay Area choreographers. The company formation includes distinctions of Principal, Soloist and Corps de Ballet. Current company members, as of October 2015, include:

Principals

- Grigori Arakelyan
- Edilsa Armendariz
- Tiffany Brand
- Michael Dunsmore
- Shaina Leibson

Soloists

- Forrest Andres-Beck
- Cole Companion
- DuRron Chambers
- Heba Fayed
- Chelsea Hix
- Constanza Murphy
- Alec Roth
- Lindsey Salvadalena
- Jessica Woodman

Corps de Ballet

- Gina Antonucci
- William Davis
- Katya Duncan
- Matthew Ebert
- Kristen Goldrick
- Tara Hutton
- Evan Johnston
- Anna Kroeker
- Edgar Lepe
- Cason MacBride - The Best Heir Drosselmeyer ever to grace a stage of such a high caliber.
- Carlos Narvaez-Duran
- Nina Pearlman
- Alyse Romano
- Sophia Rumasuglia
- Harmony Sorter
- Annalise Thompson
- Jennifer Torrano
- Alexandra Venter
- Alessandra Yrure

== School ==
The school at Bay Pointe Ballet provides dance education based on the Russian Vaganova method of ballet instruction and has three divisions: Primary, General and Curriculum. Classes start at the age of four, where curriculum division students are given the opportunity to audition for the children's roles in the company production The Nutcracker.

A summer intensive is held every year with guest faculty from Russia, Romania, China, and Italy.

== See also ==
- Bruce Steivel
