= Credo (Penderecki) =

1998 composition by Krzysztof Penderecki

- by Krzysztof Penderecki
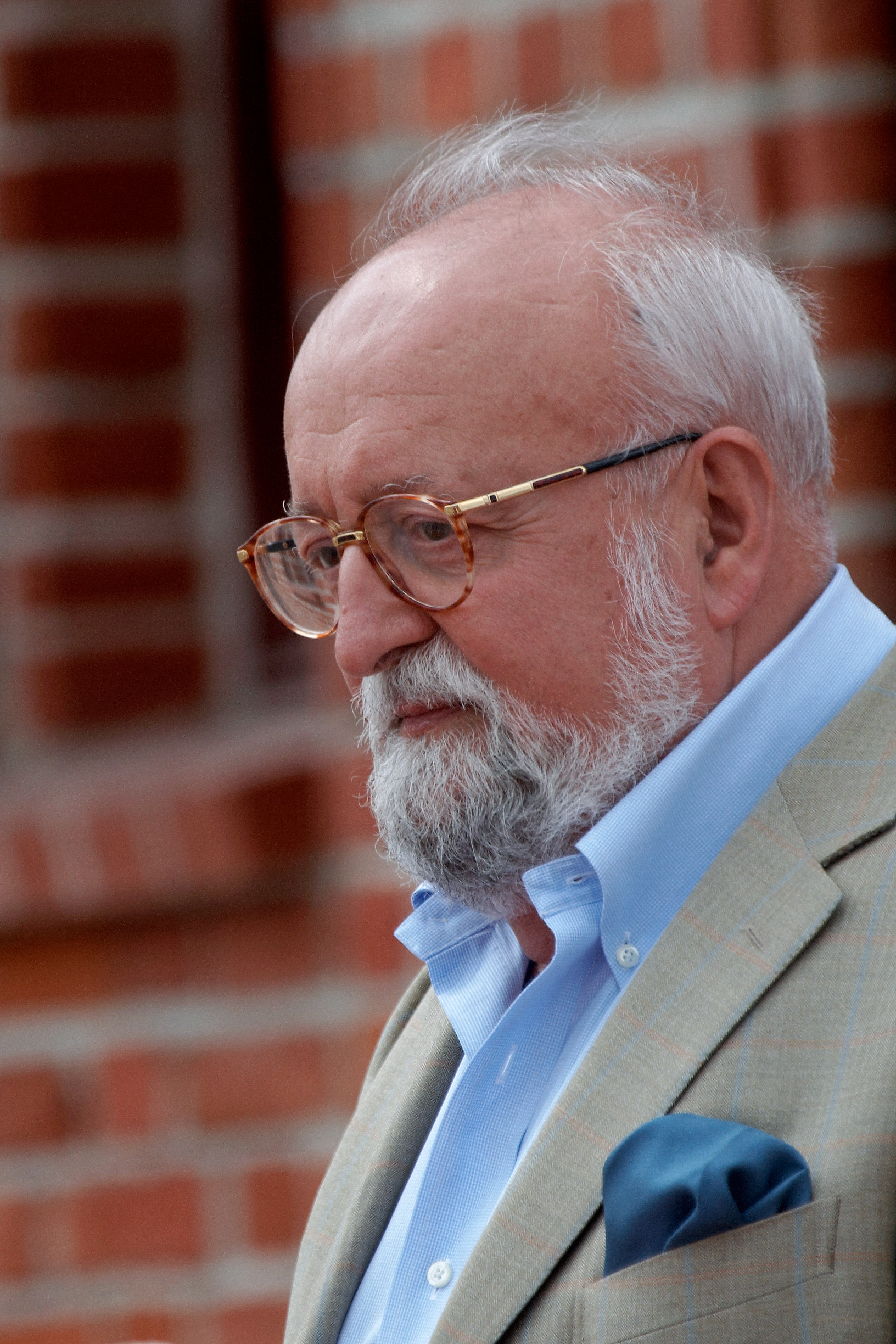
- The composer in 2008
- Text: Credo, from the Mass and additional texts
- Language: Latin, Polish, German
- Composed: 1997–98
- Performed: 11 July 1998
- 2000 Grammy Award

Credo is a large-scale sacred composition for soloists, children's choir, mixed choir and orchestra by Krzysztof Penderecki, completed in 1998. It was commissioned by Helmuth Rilling for the Oregon Bach Festival, where it was first performed on 11 July 1998. Penderecki expanded the liturgical text by hymns and Bible verses in Latin, Polish and German. A recording won the 2000 Grammy Award for best choral performance.

== History ==
In 1996, Penderecki was commissioned by the choral conductor Helmuth Rilling to compose a mass, planned for performances at the Internationale Bachakademie Stuttgart and the Oregon Bach Festival. Penderecki began with writing the Credo which is central to the text, working from 1997 to 1998. It turned so large that it defied the original liturgical use, and became an independent work.

Rilling conducted the first performance on 11 July 1998 in Eugene at the Oregon Bach Festival, with soloists Juliane Banse, Milagro Vargas, Marietta Simpson, Thomas Randle and Thomas Quasthoff, the Phoenix Boys Choir, and Oregon Bach Festival chorus and orchestra. The same year, Rilling conducted national premieres in Russia, Poland and Germany. Rilling conducted a recording which won the 2000 Grammy Award in the category best choral performance.

It was published by Schott. The composer conducted the work first for the Ukrainian premiere with the National Symphony Orchestra of Ukraine at the Organ Music Concert Hall in Kyiv on 31 March 1999. After many performances around the world, he conducted it again in Kyiv at the 29th Kyiv Music Fest in 2018, marking the centenary of Polish independence.

== Text, structure and scoring ==
The Credo uses the Latin text of the Nicene Creed from the order of mass, with added texts chosen by the composer. Penderecki structured the work in seven movements:

1. Credo
2. Qui propter nos homines
3. Et incarnatus est
4. Crucifixus
5. Et resurrexit
6. Et in Spiritum Sanctum
7. Et vitam venturi saeculi

Added texts include at the end of the third movement verses from the hymn Pange lingua, beginning "Crux fidelis". The movement is concluded by compiled texts of venerating the Cross, entitled Crucem tuam adoramus Domine (We venerate your Cross, Lord): a Polish liturgical hymn asking the Crucified for mercy, the line "Popule meus, quid feci tibi?" from the Improperia, the beginning of the Pange lingua, a Polish adaptation of "Popule meus", the first stanza from Luther's hymn "Aus tiefer Not schrei ich zu dir", a parahrase of Psalm 130, and a repetition of "Popule meus". In the fourth movement, a passage from the Revelation is inserted (chapter 11, verse 15). In the fifth movement, the expectation of the resurrection of the dead is followed by a hymn "Salve festa dies" (Hail, festive day), and the phrase "life of the world to come" is expanded by verse 24 from Psalm 118, "Haec dies, quam fecit Dominus: Exultemus et laetemur in ea." (This is the day, which the Lord has made: Let us rejoice and be glad in it.) and an Alleluja.

The duration is given as one hour. The Credo is scored for soprano, mezzo-soprano, alto, tenor and bass soloists, children's choir, SATB mixed choir and orchestra. A reviewer described the music as expansive, "darkly romantic in manner", and with an "unerring immediacy of effect".

== Recordings ==
Credo was recorded by the Warsaw Boys' Choir, the Warsaw Philharmonic Chorus and the Warsaw Philharmonic Orchestra conducted by Antoni Wit, in a series of Penderecki's compositions. It was coupled with his 1964 Cantata in honorem Almæ Matris Universitatis Iagellonicæ sescentos abhinc annos fundatæ. A recording was also made of a performance by the same forces who premiered the work: Helmuth Rilling and the Oregon Bach Festival Orchestra and Choir, with the soloists listed above.
