= Oregon Bach Festival =

Annual music festival in Oregon, US

- Genre: Classical
- Dates: June through July, annually
- Locations: Eugene, Oregon, USA
- Years active: 1970–2019, 2021–
- Founders: Helmuth Rilling; Royce Saltzman
- Website: www.oregonbachfestival.org

Oregon Bach Festival (OBF) is an annual celebration of the works of Johann Sebastian Bach and his musical legacy, held in Eugene, Oregon, United States, in late June and early July.

== About the festival ==
The festival presents a diverse slate of concerts and guest artists, which in recent years has included non-Bach-related programs by Garrison Keillor, Bobby McFerrin, Frederica von Stade and Yo-Yo Ma; it maintains a focus on choral-orchestral repertoire, including commissions and premieres; and it undertakes extensive educational activities, including the Stangeland Family Youth Choral Academy, directed by conductor Anton Armstrong of St. Olaf College, and the Oregon Bach Festival Composers Symposium. The Wall Street Journal has called OBF "one of the world’s leading music festivals".

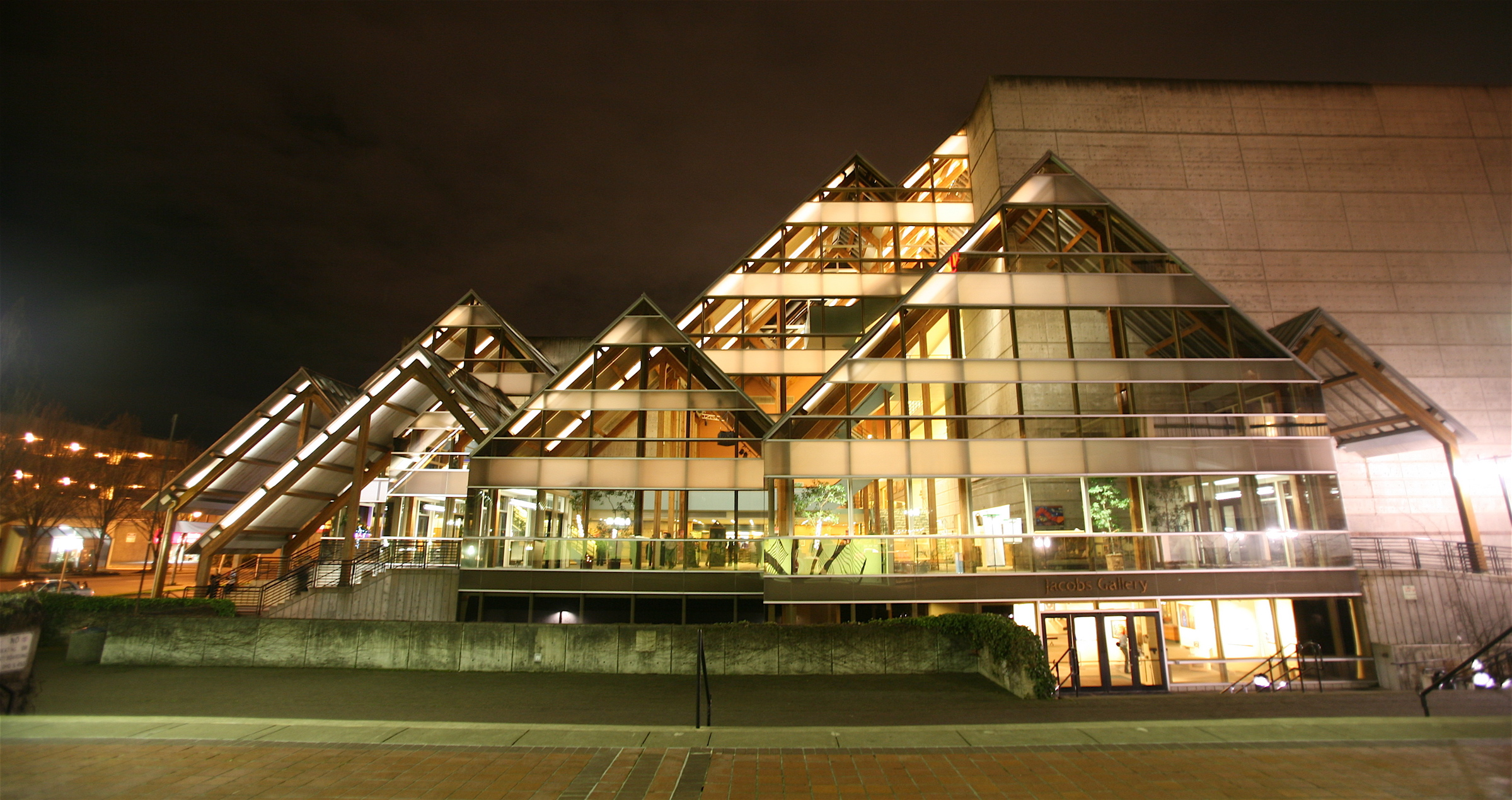
The Hult Center is one of the venues for the Oregon Bach Festival

Oregon Bach Festival is a donor-supported program of the University of Oregon. The activities of the festival are concentrated at Eugene's Hult Center for the Performing Arts and at the University of Oregon's School of Music & Dance, primarily at Beall Hall.

== History ==
The festival was founded in 1970 by German conductor Helmuth Rilling and the former president of the American Choral Directors Association, Royce Saltzman, as an informal series of classes and concerts at the University of Oregon. By the late 1970s, the roster had expanded to include full-scale choral-orchestral performances. Although originally inspired by the music of Bach, the festival quickly moved beyond a strict boundary of repertoire. Bach, however, remains a centerpiece of the festival via Helmuth Rilling's conducting master class, which leads students through Cantatas, Masses, Passions, and other such choral works. Additionally, the festival frequently performs the largest Bach works with full forces; for example, in the 300th-anniversary year of Bach's birth in 1985, the festival performed the St. John Passion, St. Matthew Passion, B-minor Mass, and all six Brandenburg Concertos, culminating in an appearance at the Hollywood Bowl. The success of the Bach Festival model and structure led Helmuth Rilling to create the Internationale Bachakademie Stuttgart and several other Bach Academies around the world.

In addition to the leadership of Helmuth Rilling, many other musicians have developed long-term relationships with the OBF. Conductor and pianist Jeffrey Kahane has been performing at the festival for over 20 years, and musicologist Robert Levin has also been a frequent participant. Baroque specialist Monica Huggett has appeared as an ensemble leader in 2009 and 2010. Baritone Thomas Quasthoff made his American debut at the OBF in 1995 and has returned several times since. Recent appearances have also been made by Midori, Sarah Chang, the Kronos Quartet, The Five Browns, and a variety of other classical stars. The festival also hosts "cross-over" or popular acts like Garrison Keillor, Savion Glover and Pink Martini..

=== The festival in the 21st century ===
Royce Saltzman retired in 2006 and was replaced as Executive Director by John Evans, a former BBC producer and published Benjamin Britten scholar. With Evans's arrival in 2007, the festival expanded to include concerts throughout Oregon, including at Portland's Arlene Schnitzer Concert Hall and Bend's Tower Theatre. Recent seasons have also included collaborations with other regional arts organizations, including the Oregon Shakespeare Festival, Portland Baroque Orchestra, and Eugene Ballet. The Festival has also completed its first endowment campaign, raising over $10 million.

Dr Robert Kyr serves as director of the Oregon Bach Festival Composers Symposium, a hands-on element of OBF programming wherein composers compose collaboratively, listen to presentations by composers-in-residence, and take part in workshops.

The 2010 festival, billed as a 40th-anniversary gala year (the 41st), included appearances by Thomas Quasthoff, Pink Martini, Bobby McFerrin, Robert Levin and Ya-Fei Chuang, and the Portland Baroque Orchestra. It also featured a Bernstein celebration featuring a residency by Jamie Bernstein.

Phyllis and Andy Berwick donated $7.25 million to the festival in 2014, which is the largest gift in the group's history. Subsequently, Berwick Hall was christened as the first permanent home of the Festival in October 2017.

=== Milestones ===
The festival has commissioned, co-commissioned, or presented premieres of numerous musical works, including:

- Felix Mendelssohn, The Uncle from Boston (world premiere of rediscovered manuscript)
- Stephen Paulus, Symphony for Strings (world premiere)
- Arvo Pärt, Litany (world premiere)
- Osvaldo Golijov, Oceana (world premiere)
- Krzysztof Penderecki, Credo (world premiere)
- Tan Dun, Water Passion (American premiere)
- Sven-David Sandström, Messiah (world premiere)
- Sir James MacMillan, A European Requiem (world premiere)
- Kim André Arnesen, Falling into Mercy (world premiere)
- Philip Glass, Piano Concerto No. 3 (regional premiere)
- Richard Danielpour, The Passion of Yeshua (world premiere)

The festival has also released or participated in 12 commercial recordings since 1990, with the recording of Penderecki's Credo winning the 2001 Grammy Award for Best Choral Performance.

== See also ==
- List of Bach festivals
- List of music festivals in the United States
