= Bruce Steivel =

Bruce Steivel (1949–Present) is an American ballet dancer, choreographer, and artistic director of Bay Pointe Ballet.

== Career ==
Bruce Steivel is currently artistic director of Bay Pointe Ballet (BPB), located in South San Francisco, CA. He has previously held the title of artistic director at several major companies around the globe including Bern Stadt Theatre, Hong Kong Ballet, Universal Ballet, Nevada Ballet Theatre and Serbian National Ballet.

As a choreographer, he has created 17 ballets, including his own version of The Nutcracker, Peter Pan, A Midsummer Night’s Dream and Dracula. In the current repertoire of at least five major ballet companies as of October 2013, several of Bruce Steivel's ballets are in production around the world.

During his dance career, he worked and trained under several prominent choreographers and teachers including George Balanchine, Anton Dolin, Jiri Kylian, Ben Stevenson, Roland Petit, Andre Eglevsky, David Howard, Heinz Spoerli and Alexandra Danoliva. As a dancer, he performed major roles in the classical ballet repertoire. These lead roles include Romeo in the ballet Romeo and Juliet, Franz in Coppelia, Albrecht in Giselle, and Prince in The Nutcracker.
