= Euan Francis Barclay Tait =

Welsh-Scottish Librettist, poet and teacher (born 1968)

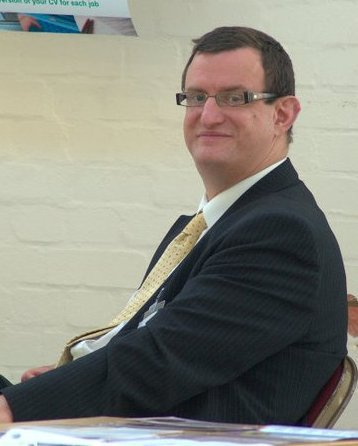
- Born: 7 June 1968 (age 57); Berlin, Germany
- Occupations: Librettist, retreat host, teacher

Euan Francis Barclay Tait (born 7 June 1968) is a Welsh-Scottish librettist, poet, retreat leader, and teacher. He works internationally with choral composers. Tait has worked with Paul Spicer, Kim Andre Arnesen, Timothy Tharaldson, Dominic McGonigal, Carson Cooman, Chris Hutchings, and Janet Oates amongst numerous others.

== Early life and education ==
Euan Tait was born in Berlin, Germany. and spent some of his childhood in Virginia, in the United States, where his father worked at the British embassy in Washington DC. Tait earned his master's degree in Creative Writing from Manchester Metropolitan University and received his BA (Hons) in English Language and Literature from the University of Hull. He further acquired a Postgraduate Certificate in Education from the University of Wales.

== Career ==
=== Librettist and poet ===
Tait is a renowned librettist, who leads music retreats and training events in various locations across the UK, including Douai Abbey, Launde Abbey, and Ammerdown Centre. He has developed libretti with international contemporary choral composers such as Paul Spicer, Kim Andre Arnesen, Timothy Tharaldson, Dominic McGonigal, Carson Cooman, Chris Hutchings, and Janet Oates. His collaboration with international composers resulted in a multi-movement Christmas work, The Christmas Alleluias, and a number of shorter pieces, some of which are best sellers including the well-known "Flight Song". Tait also produced the text of two major works, the choral symphony "Unfinished Remembering" in 2014 with Paul Spicer and “The Wound in the Water” with Kim Andre Arnesen.

Working with Kim Andre Arnesen, Tait wrote the text for the internationally performed "Flight Song", "The Wound in the Water - 2016", and "The Christmas Alleluias - 2015", initially performed by The Valley Chamber Chorale, Stillwater, Minnesota. "The Flight Song" has forty different performances on YouTube and has sold numerous copies.

In 2018, Tait released three of his pieces on a major record label, Naxos. His future projects include the libretti for major choral works for the UK and the USA.

Tait's poetry has been published in the US and in the Irish Republic.

=== Teacher, trainer and retreat leader ===
Tait has led retreats and training events across the UK since 2011, who leads music retreats, focusing on major choral works, and training events in various locations across the UK, including Douai Abbey, Launde Abbey, the Ammerdown Centre, and Minsteracres in Country Durham.

Tait has worked as a lecturer in English since 2014 in a college in southern England. From 1990 till 1992, Tait volunteered as a Parish Assistant in Hull, England; from 1992 to 2001, Tait was a member of the L’Arche community in Bognor Regis, West Sussex, England, where he helped support people with learning disabilities in their homes and at work. From 2001 - 2011, Tait worked supporting clients with learning disabilities at work. In 2011, Euan Tait joined Ammerdown Retreat and Conference Centre as a Trainer and Interfaith officer, where he led retreats, provided training for local schools, and developed the centre's outreach to local Muslims.

== Personal life ==
Tait is the son of John Barclay Tait, a Scottish soldier (d.1987), and Pauline Tait, a teacher and book editor (d.2012) who worked for Macmillan mainly with African authors. His paternal grandfather was a well-known oceanographer. He is currently based in the Wye valley in southeast Wales, United Kingdom.
