= Mogens Dahl =

Mogens Dahl (born 1953) is a Danish conductor, founder and owner of Mogens Dahl Concert Hall and conductor of Mogens Dahl Chamber Choir, married to the Danish business woman Jette Egelund.

== Background ==
Mogens Dahl was born in Thisted in 1953, in a family with seven children.

Mogens Dahl graduated cand.phil. from Aarhus University in 1980, and as a conductor from The Royal Academy in 1983. He has taught at the conservatory in Aarhus and the Aalborg University. From 1991 he was choirmaster on The Royal Opera in Aarhus.

He is married to Jette Egelund which is second generation in the company Vipp and it is in the company's buildings on Islands Brygge that he has established Denmark's first private concert hall for classical chamber music, Mogens Dahl Concert Hall, which is celebrated with the P2 price from Denmark's Radio.

== Sources ==
- politiken.dk – Owner of a private concert hall
- DR.dk - "Name of The Week - Denmark's National TV-broadcast
