= Kim André Arnesen =

Norwegian composer (born 1980)

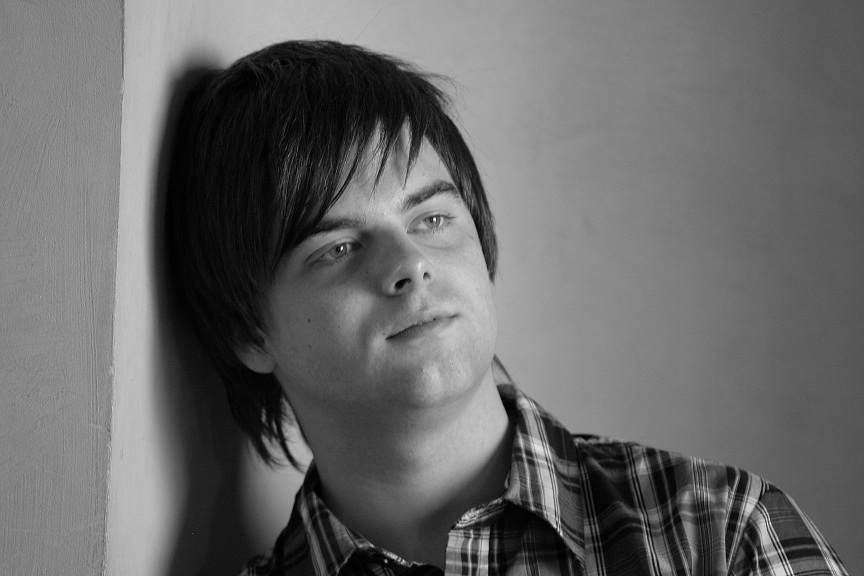
- Kim André Arnesen
- Born: 28 November 1980 (age 45); Trondheim, Norway
- Education: NTNU
- Occupations: Composer and producer
- Website: kimarnesen.com

Kim André Arnesen (born 28 November 1980) is a Norwegian composer. He grew up in Trondheim, Norway and was educated at the Music Conservatory of the Norwegian University of Science and Technology. He is mostly known for his choral compositions, both a cappella, accompanied by piano or organ, or large-scale works for chorus and orchestra. His first CD album "Magnificat" was nominated for Grammy Awards 2016 in the category Best Surround Sound Album. He has received wide notice with his choral works that has been performed by choirs all over the world. His "Cradle Hymn" was a part of the regional Emmy Prize winning show "Christmas in Norway". Arnesen is an elected member of the Norwegian Society of Composers.

== Biography ==
Kim André Arnesen was educated at the Music Conservatory in Trondheim, Norway. He had composition lessons with composers like Henning Sommerro, Terje Bjørklund and Odd Johan Overøye. As a composer he had his first performance in 1999 with Nidaros Cathedral Boys' Choir. Since then he has written music that has been performed by several choirs. Arnesen is an elected member of the Norwegian Society of Composers. In 2010, his first large-scale work was performed in Nidaros Cathedral in Trondheim. This was a Magnificat commissioned by the Nidaros Cathedral's Girls Choir. This performance received overwhelming feedback, leading directly to several new commissions. The work was released on 2L in 2014 and the album was nominated for GRAMMY Awards 2016 in the category Best Surround Sound Album.

In 2011 his choral motet Even when He is silent had its premiere during the St. Olav Festival (Olavsfestdagene) in Trondheim. The motet was commissioned by the festival and was performed during an event with the bishop of Nidaros, Tor Singsaas and the international acclaimed Norwegian actress, Liv Ullmann. The piece has gained wide attention and is being performed by choirs all over the world. In December 2011, his second large-scale work was premiered. This was a Christmas work commissioned by the Trondheim Chamber Choir. In 2013 his pieces Even when He is silent and Cradle Hymn were released on CD, DVD and Blu-ray on the "Christmas in Norway" with the St. Olaf Choir and Nidaros Cathedral Girls' Choir.

In April 2014 his Requiem was premiered by the Nidaros Cathedral Boy's Choir. Later in 2014 his Magnificat was released on CD/Blu-ray on the label 2L. He has produced a number of works with the Welsh-Scots poet Euan Tait, including Flight Song (2014), You asked me to speak (a companion piece for Even When He is Silent), Love's Onward Journey, The Call of Peace, Child of Song (all 2015) and a new five movement Christmas work, The Christmas Alleluias (2015).

In 2016 a large scale work called The Wound in the Water, was premiered by the GRAMMY-winning ensemble Conspirare (libretto, Euan Tait). Three major new works have followed: Holy Spirit Mass, for the National Lutheran Choir and first performed in Washington DC in October 2017; Sing the Earth (Southwestern University Singers and Festival Mass Choir, 2018 Southwestern Music Festival, Morton H. Meyerson Symphony Center in Dallas, Texas. Jonathan E. L. Wall, director); Tuvayhun - Beatitudes for a Wounded World (Premiere in NYC, April 2018, Manhattan Girls' Chorus, dir. Michelle Oesterle). The two latter works, in which the composer has explored new instrumental sonorities, have texts by American lyricist Charles Anthony 'Tony' Silvestri.

January 2018 also saw the release of a Naxos recording of his shorter choral works.

In December 2020 and January 2021 Kim released four piano singles: Light a Candle, December Night, Snow Light, and Winter Moon on Decca Classics. Winter Moon reached No.1 on Apple Music's classical charts.

Kim is an elected member of the Norwegian Composers Society and his music is published by Boosey & Hawkes.

== Selected works ==
Arnesen's work has been published by Santa Barbara Music Publishing and Boosey & Hawkes

- Ubi caritas et amor for SATB chorus (2017).
- Tuvayhun - Beatitudes for a Wounded World (2018, text, Charles Anthony Silvestri) Commissioned by Manhattan Girls Chorus and Artistic Director Michelle Oesterle
- Sing the Earth (2017, text, Charles Anthony Silvestri) fp. Southwestern University Singers and Festival Mass Choir, dir. Jonathan E.L Wall.
- Holy Spirit Mass (2017) commissioned by the National Lutheran Choir, fp Washington DC.
- His Light in Us (2016, text, Euan Tait). Commissioned by the St. Olaf Choir and Dr. Anton Armstrong for the 2016 St. Olaf Christmas Festival.
- The Wound in the Water (70 mins, for soprano solo, SATB chorus, piano and strings, libretto Euan Tait). Work in three parts, commissioned by Olavsfestdagene Trondheim, fp. Trondheim Cathedral 2016.
- The Christmas Alleluias (25 mins, for harp and SATB chorus, 2015, text by Euan Tait). 5 movement work, commissioned by The Valley Chamber Chorale, Stillwater, Minnesota and Artistic Director Carol Carver.
- Heartsongs (60 mins. for solo piano, 2014). To be released on CD in 2014.
- Å jul med din glede - a Christmas Suite (30 mins. for female chorus, trumpet, strings and percussion). Commissioned by the Nidaros Cathedral Girls´Choir.
- Requiem (48 mins. for mixed chorus, solo mezzo-soprano and orchestra, 2013/14). Commissioned by the Nidaros Cathedral Boys´Choir.
- Star of the East (35 mins. for mixed chorus, solo soprano, strings and harp, 2011). Commissioned by the Trondheim Chamber Choir.
- Magnificat (37 mins. for female or mixed chorus, solo soprano, strings, piano and organ, 2010). Commissioned by the Nidaros Cathedral Girls´Choir.
- Norwegian Alleluia (2 mins. for chorus a cappella, 2014). Commissioned by the Baylor A Cappella, Baylor University and conductor Alan Raines.
- O sacrum convivium (6 mins. for chorus a cappella, 2014). Commissioned by the Mogens Dahl Chamber Choir.
- Child of Song (6 mins, SATB a capella, text Euan Tait, 2015. Premiered by the VocalEssence Ensemble and conductor Philip Brunelle on May 14, 2015, at the 40th anniversary celebration of The American Composers Forum, i.m. Stephen Paulus.
- Love's Onward Journey (4 mins, SSAA chorus a capella, text Euan Tait, 2015). Dedicated to the Manhattan Girls Chorus and conductor Michelle Oesterle with admiration and gratitude. World Premiere May 20, 2015 NYC.
- You asked me to speak (6 mins, for SATB chorus, 2015, text Euan Tait, 2015). Commissioned by The Kokopelli Choirs, Canada and Artistic Director Scott Leithead. fp Feb 2015.
- Flight Song (4 mins. for chorus and piano, text Euan Tait, 2014). Dedicated to the St. Olaf Choir and conductor Anton Armstrong.
- Love divine (4 mins. for female chorus and piano, 2013). Commissioned by Nidaros Cathedral Girls' Choir.
- Calma (4 mins. for trombone and organ, 2013). Commissioned by Christian Aftret Eriksen.
- Dormi, Jesu (4 mins. for chorus cappella, 2012). Commissioned by A Cappellissimo.
- Even when He is silent (5 mins. for chorus cappella, 2011). Commissioned by the St. Olaf Festival (Olavsfestdagene).
- Cradle Hymn (5 mins. for female or mixed chorus with piano or organ, or piano with strings, 2010). Dedicated to the Nidaros Cathedral Girls´Choir and conductor Anita Brevik.
- Julenatt (4 mins. for female or mixed chorus with piano, or strings and flute, 2009).

== Discography ==
- TUVAYHUN — Beatitudes for a Wounded World (2L-171-SABD) Nidaros Cathedral Girls´Choir and the Trondheimsoloists.
- Magnificat (2L 2L-106-SABD) Nidaros Cathedral Girls´Choir and the Trondheimsoloists.
- Even when He is silent (SKU: E 3501 CD) St. Olaf Choir
- Cradle Hymn (SKU: E 3501 CD) Nidaros Cathedral Girls´Choir
- Infinity (Naxos 8.57378) A selection of shorter choral works. Kantorei, dir. Joel Rinsema.
- Even when He is silent (Decca Classics), Voces 8.
