= Eugene Ballet =

Ballet company

Eugene Ballet Company

General information
- Name: Eugene Ballet Company
- Year founded: 1978
- Founders: Riley Grannon, Co-founder; Toni Pimble, Co-founder, first Artistic Director, and Resident Choreographer
- Location: Eugene, Oregon, USA
- Website: https://eugeneballet.org/

Senior staff
- Executive director: Josh Neckels
- Ballet Academy Director: Sara Lombardi

Artistic staff
- Artistic director: Toni Pimble

Eugene Ballet is an American ballet company based in Eugene, Oregon. A resident company of the Hult Center for the Performing Arts, it performs a repertoire of full-length classical ballets, contemporary pieces, and operates a ballet academy. For more than 20 years, the National Endowment for the Arts has funded Eugene Ballet performances throughout the Pacific Northwest and nationally.

== History ==
Eugene Ballet opened in Eugene in 1979, performing The Soldier's Tale. In 1982, the company toured and performed in Taiwan. Other highlights of the company's early history include their 1990 performance of Ken Kesey's Little Tricker the Squirrel meets Big Double the Bear, their first performances of Swan Lake in 1992, and Arts America international tour funded by the U.S. Information Agency in 1995.

The company performed with Pink Martini in 2006 and 2018. Eugene Ballet joined in performance with San Francisco Ballet, Pacific Northwest Ballet, and Oregon Ballet Theatre at Schnitzer Concert Hall in Portland, Oregon in 2008. The company has also performed in the Oregon Festival of American Music and the Oregon Bach Festival, as well as with the American Symphonia, Oregon Mozart Players, and the Eugene Opera,

Eugene Ballet's Suzanne Haag is the Resident Choreographer. She was given this role in 2018 after performing with the company for 15 years.

== Programs ==
=== Repertoire of classical ballets ===
Eugene Ballet performed Firebird at the 1982 opening of the Hult Center.

The company received a $15,000 National Endowment for the Arts grant in 2018, "To support the premiere of Peer Gynt, a multimedia ballet by choreographer Toni Pimble based on Henrik Ibsen's fairy tale play, Peer Gynt."

Other classical ballets in the company's repertoire include Swan Lake, The Nutcracker, and Schéhérazade.

=== Eugene Ballet Academy ===
The Eugene Ballet Academy begin offering lessons in 1964, "To provide a sound education and inspiring opportunities in dance that nurture, motivate and instill an appreciation of the art of classical ballet and dance repertoire." It serves dance students from age three to adult. Eugene Ballet Academy and Eugene Ballet Company have Pre-Professional and Aspirant programs.

== Financials ==
Revenues in 2018 exceeded US$2.78 million, and total assets more than US$3.630 million.

== Awards, grants ==
- Governors Arts Awards for Excellence in the Arts, 1996
- In 2017, the Eugene Weekly reported EBC had received NEA grants for 20 years.
