= Mogens Dahl Concert Hall =

Music venue in Copenhagen, Denmark

Coordinates: 55°39′49″N 12°34′34″E

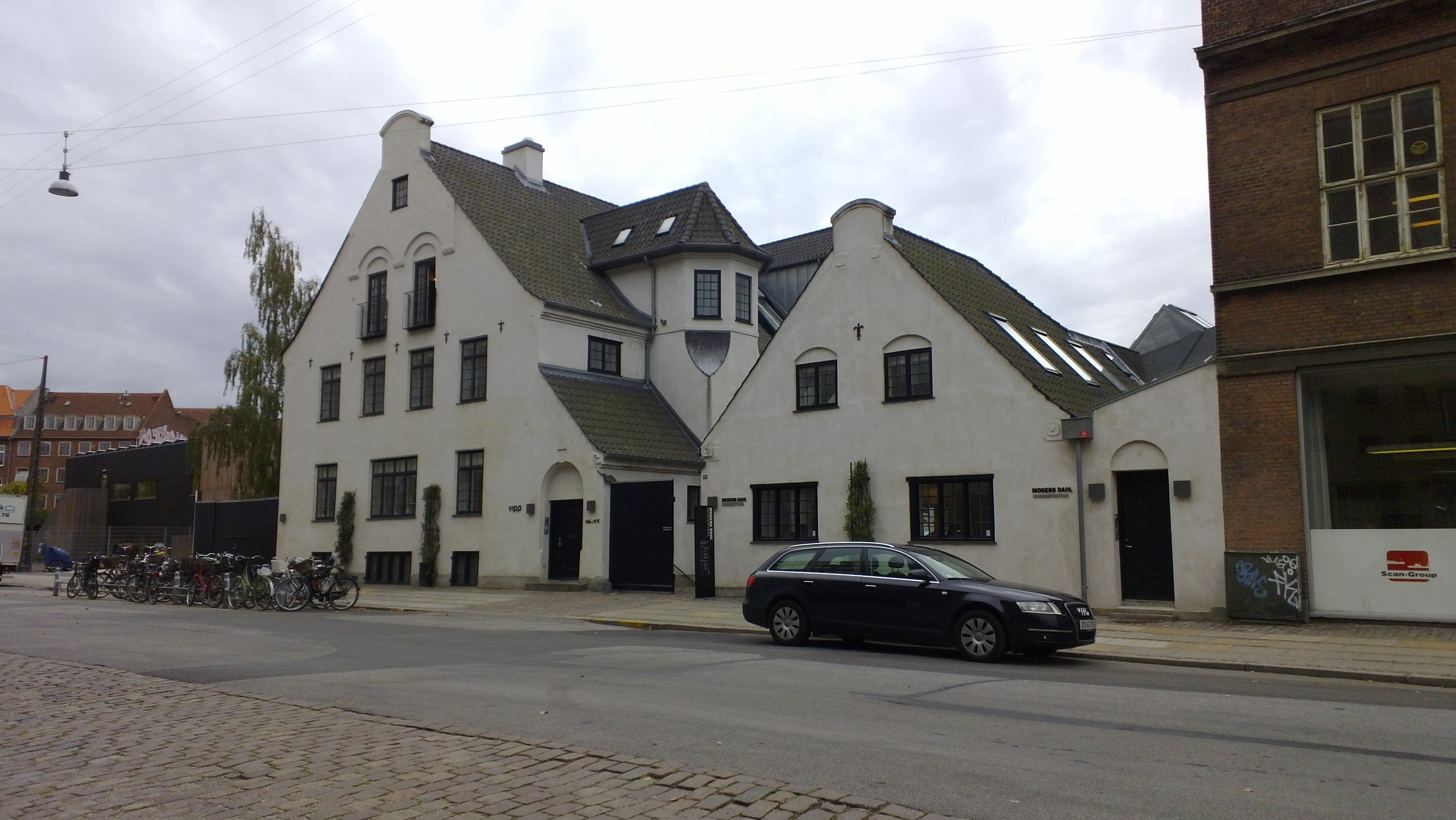
Mogens Dahl Concert Hall

Mogens Dahl Concert Hall is a chamber music venue in the Islands Brygge district of Copenhagen, Denmark. It was opened at the private initiative of Mogens Dahl in 2005.

== Background ==
The concert hall is located in the former Hertz Book Publishing House from 1901. The complex also houses the design company VIPP. The hall is named after its founder and owner, conductor Mogens Dahl.

== Use ==
The concert hall plays host to Chamber concerts with both Danish and international names. It also has its own chamber ensemble, Mogens Dahl Chamber Choir.

== Notable performers ==
- Leif Ove Andsnes, piano
- Tokyo String Quartet
- Bo Skovhus, barytone
- Juilliard String Quartet
- Angela Hewitt, piano
- Trio Wanderer
- Trio con Brio Copenhagen
