= Vaganov =

Vaganov (Russian: Ваганов) is a Russian toponymic masculine surname relating to a person living near the river Vaga, its feminine counterpart is Vaganova. Notable people with the surname include:

- Agrippina Vaganova (1879–1951), Russian ballet teacher known for
  - Vaganova method
  - Vaganova Academy of Russian Ballet
- Ekaterina Vaganova (born 1988), Russian dancer
- Gennady Vaganov (born 1930), Soviet cross-country skier
- Ilya Vaganov (born 1989), Russian footballer
- Sergei Vaganov (born 1985), Russian footballer
- Stepan Vaganov (1886–1918), Russian sailor and Bolshevik revolutionary

== Fictional characters ==
- Gleb Vaganov, a character from the Broadway adaptation of the 1997 film Anastasia

== See also ==
- Vaganova, Perm Krai, a village in Russia
