= Helmuth Rilling =

German choral conductor (1933–2026)

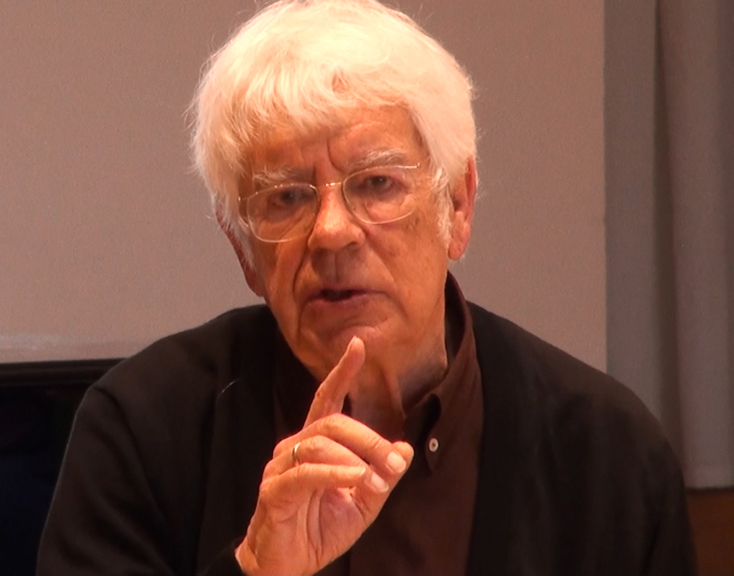
- Rilling in 2013
- Born: 29 May 1933; Stuttgart, Germany
- Died: 11 February 2026 (aged 92); Leonberg, Germany
- Occupations: Choral conductor; Academic teacher
- Organizations: Gächinger Kantorei; Frankfurter Kantorei; Bach-Collegium Stuttgart; Oregon Bach Festival; Internationale Bachakademie Stuttgart; Musikhochschule Frankfurt
- Awards: Herbert von Karajan Music Prize; Grammy Award

Helmuth Rilling (29 May 1933 – 11 February 2026) was a German choral conductor and an academic teacher who was internationally known as an authority on the music of Johann Sebastian Bach. He was the founder of the Gächinger Kantorei in 1954 when still a student, the Bach-Collegium Stuttgart in 1965, the Oregon Bach Festival in 1970, the Internationale Bachakademie Stuttgart in 1981 and other Bach Academies worldwide, as well as the Festival Ensemble Stuttgart (FES) in 2001 and Junges Stuttgarter Bach Ensemble in 2011. He taught choral conducting at the Musikhochschule Frankfurt from 1965 to 1989 and led the Frankfurter Kantorei from 1969 to 1982. He held talk concerts, introducing the music with the performers, internationally and notably in Eastern Europe.

In 1985, Rilling was the first to have recorded Bach's complete church cantatas, and recordings of Bach's complete works were issued by 2000. He performed the world premiere of the Messa per Rossini (which Verdi had initiated upon the death of Rossini) in 1988. He recorded 20th-century works such as Honegger's Jeanne d'Arc au bûcher and Penderecki's Credo, the latter commissioned and performed by the Oregon Bach Festival and winning the 2001 Grammy Award for best choral performance. He continued to lead the Gächinger Kantorei and the Bach-Collegium Stuttgart until 2013.

== Life and career ==
Rilling was born on 29 May 1933 in Stuttgart into a musical family; his father was organist and music teacher, and his mother a violinist. Rilling attended school at Protestant seminaries in Württemberg where he received musical and theological training. After his Abitur at Stift Urach in 1952, he studied at the Musikhochschule Stuttgart, organ with Karl Gerock, composition with Johann Nepomuk David and chorale conducting with Hans Grischkat. After his state exam in 1955, he studied further, with Fernando Germani in Rome and at the Accademia Musicale Chigiana in Siena.

While still a student in 1954, he founded his first choir, the Gächinger Kantorei. From 1957, he was organist and choirmaster at the Stuttgart Gedächtniskirche where he conducted the choir Figuralchor der Gedächtniskirche Stuttgart and was instrumental in the building of a new Walcker organ. From 1963 to 1966, he taught organ and choral at the Spandauer Kirchenmusikschule, conducting the Spandauer Kantorei. He founded and conducted the Bach-Collegium Stuttgart from 1965, which often performed with the Gächinger Kantorei. In New York City in 1967, he took a course in conducting with Leonard Bernstein, who became a model for introducing the music to be performed.

In 1969 Rilling was appointed professor of choral conducting at the Frankfurt University of Music and Performing Arts, a post that he held until 1985. His students include Hans-Christoph Rademann, Matthias Manasi and Eberhard Friedrich. In 1969, Rilling also took over as conductor of the Frankfurter Kantorei.

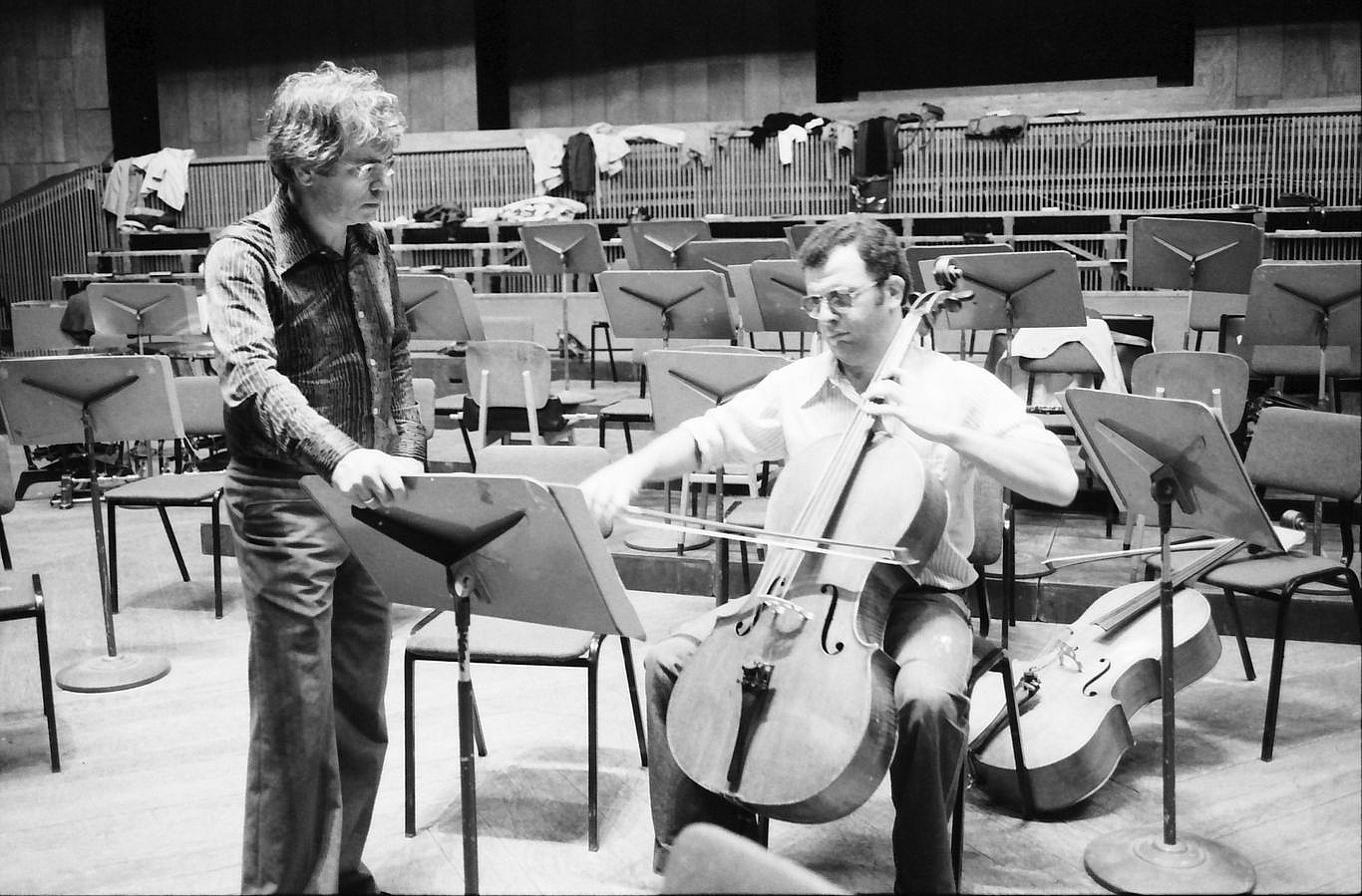
Rilling in rehearsal in Israel (1979)

Rilling became well known for his performances of the music of Johann Sebastian Bach, touring widely with the Gächinger Kantorei and the Bach Collegium Stuttgart and often introducing the music in talk concerts. The talks included music examples by all performers, making the music accessible for all kinds of listeners because specialist terminology was "translated" immediately into sounds. Rilling co-founded the Oregon Bach Festival in 1970, and served as its artistic director until 2013. Also in 1970, he was the first German conductor to lead the Israel Philharmonic Orchestra. He also held talk concerts in Eastern Europe, and conducted Bach's Mass in B minor in an open-air-concert at the Dresden Zwinger before German reunification. He was an ambassador bringing Bach's music towards better understanding outside West Germany. The Polish composer Krzysztof Penderecki became a friend.

Rilling co-founded and led the Internationale Bachakademie Stuttgart in 1981, offering seminars, lectures, open rehearsals, master classes, workshops and concerts. In 1988, he conducted the world premiere of the Messa per Rossini; he also conducted the work at the Rheingau Musik Festival in 2001, where he traditionally led the final concert. In 2001, Rilling created the Festival Ensemble as part of the European Music Festival Stuttgart. He became the festival conductor and lecturer at the Toronto Bach Festival in 2004. He continued to lead the Gächinger Kantorei and the Bach-Collegium Stuttgart until 2013, and retired from conducting concerts in 2018.

Rilling died in Leonberg on 11 February 2026, at the age of 92. Gerald Felber, writing for the Frankfurter Allgemeine Zeitung, characterised Rilling first as a mediator, adding "persistent, determined and with stamina".

== Recordings and awards ==
Rilling was the first conductor to record Bach's complete church cantatas, from 1970 to 1985. During this time, historically informed performances began and flourished; he was interested in more dynamic interpretation, but retained traditional instruments. He recorded the complete works of Bach by 2000 in the Edition Bachakademie, a monumental task involving over 1,000 pieces of music – spanning 172 compact discs. He also recorded many classical and romantic choral and orchestral works, including the works of Johannes Brahms. While most of his recording output was of works of Bach and other Baroque composers, he did champion and record works of contemporary composers. Rilling's recording of Penderecki's Credo, commissioned and performed by the Oregon Bach Festival, won the 2001 Grammy Award for best choral performance. He received the Bach Medal in 2004. Another example of his recording 20th century works was Honegger's Jeanne d'Arc au bûcher (Hänssler Classic, 2013).

In 2008, Rilling was awarded the Sanford Award by the Yale School of Music at Yale University. He was the 2011 recipient of the Herbert von Karajan Music Prize.

For Rilling's 75th birthday, the record label Hänssler Classic released his entire Bach edition on iTunes.
