= Vaganova, Perm Krai =

Vaganova Ваганова
- Village
- Location within Perm Krai Location within Russia
- Coordinates: 59°08′N 54°54′E
- Country: Russia
- Region: Perm Krai
- District: Kudymkarsky District
- Time zone: UTC+5:00

Vaganova (Russian: Ваганова) is a rural locality (a village) in Yorgvinskoye Rural Settlement, Kudymkarsky District, Perm Krai, Russia. The population was 262 as of 2010. There are 9 streets.

== Geography ==
Vaganova is located 24 km northeast of Kudymkar (the district's administrative centre) by road. Rodina is the nearest rural locality.
