= Scenes from the Life of a Martyr =

Scenes from the Life of a Martyr (1981), is a 16-part oratorio composed by Undine Smith Moore in memory of Martin Luther King Jr. Moore wrote the libretto, which includes passages from the Bible, quotations and poetry excerpts. It is written for a mixed choir, with solo parts for soprano, mezzo-soprano, tenor, a spoken-word narrator, and orchestra. The work takes about 40 minutes to perform and has sixteen different movements.

== History ==
Smith began work on the composition in November 1975 and spent about four years working on it. Parts of Scenes were performed in 1979 by the Harry Savage Chorale and with Moore accompanying the choir by piano. Orchestration was done by Donald Rauscher, and the work on Scenes was completed by 1980. The score was published by Carl Fischer Publishing Company, who nominated it for a Pulitzer Prize in 1981.

The official premiere of the work was complicated by scheduling difficulties, so Scenes was performed first in New Jersey in December 1981. It was later performed at Carnegie Hall on January 15, 1982 and "officially" premiered by the Richmond Symphony Orchestra on April 19, 1982.

== Story and composition ==
Moore's oratorio is meant to "comment on the private life of King," starting as far back as his childhood. The work is divided into four sections, each covering four different stages in King's life. The work starts out with the narrator's prologue and then segues into a contemporary-sounding movement which includes African-American rhythmic motives. In a similar way, the narrator "prepares" the listener for the next movements. The second section includes the first songs that Moore wrote and uses text from the Song of Solomon. The third section uses text from the gospel of Luke and then follows the "most memorable movements of the entire work," I Never Felt Such Love in My Soul Before. The final movement includes a lament and a climatic work, They Tell Me Martin Is Dead, which eventually ends with "frenzied screams and moans." The final song is a chorale, Tell All My Father's People, based on the spiritual, "Angels Waiting at the Door."

Moore had stated that she chose to write Scenes "as a way to make tangible my feelings about Dr. King." She also felt that everyone could feel a sense of "kinship" with King. She also stated that she did not want to strive for a "consistency of style," but instead wanted the music to reflect his life at the time.

== Critical response ==
Scenes received a good response from the public. Will Crutchfield of The New York Times felt that the score sounded like "background music for a documentary film," however, the finale was "suitably stirring." Bernard Holland, also of The New York Times, felt that Scenes could be compared to Krzysztof Penderecki's St. Luke Passion. John Rockwell called Scenes "conservative."

== See also ==
- Civil rights movement in popular culture
