= Joan Szymko =

American choral conductor and composer (born 1957)

Joan Szymko (born 1957) is an American choral conductor, music educator and composer. She was born in Chicago and studied choral conducting and music education at the University of Illinois Urbana-Champaign, graduating in 1978. She settled in Seattle, Washington, and worked as a music teacher, composer and choral conductor.

In 1993 Szymko took a position directing the Aurora Chorus in Portland, Oregon. She founded the women's choir Viriditas Vocal Ensemble in 1994. Szymko composed the music for the Broadway musical Do Jump! at the New Victory Theater and Jan Maher's play Most Dangerous Women.

== Works ==
Szymko composes mainly for theater and choral ensembles. Selected works include:

- All Works of Love for the Brock Commission 2010
- Nothing But Mud (text: "The Church, Zillebeke, October 1918" by William Orpen from his An Onlooker in France, 1917–1919 (1921))
- The Call
- Carpe Diem
- Ein grosser Gesang (text: poems by Rainer Maria Rilke)
- Entro en la vida (text: by Teresa of Ávila)
- The Freshness (text: Rumi)
- Hear Me! We Are One
- Herbst (text: Rainer Maria Rilke)
- How Did the Rose (text: Hafez)
- I Lift My Eyes
- I Dream a World (text: poem by Langston Hughes)
- Illumina la tenebre (text: St Francis of Assisi)
- It Takes a Village (text: West African adage)

Her music has been recorded and issued on CD, including:

- Openings (CD, 1998) Virga Records
- 2010 IMEA Honors Chorus & All-State Chorus (CD, March 31, 2010) Mark Records
- Texas Music Educators Association 2008: All-State Women's and Men's Choir (CD, April 1, 2008) Mark Records
- Consecrate: the Place and Day to Music (CD, October 2, 2007) Mark Records
- Faces of a Woman (CD, January 8, 2008) MD&G Records
- Cradle of Fire: A Tribute to the Women of World War II (CD, December 14, 2004) Indianapolis Women's Label
