= Mogens Dahl Chamber Choir =

Mogens Dahl Chamber Choir is a professional vocal ensemble founded in 2005 in Copenhagen.

The choir consists of 16 classically trained singers from all over Scandinavia, and was founded in 2005 in conjunction with the conductor, Mogens Dahl's, establishment of Mogens Dahl Concert Hall at Islands Brygge in Copenhagen. Mogens Dahl Chamber Choir has its artistic focus on Nordic and romantic music. The choir has also often new music in the repertoire, dedicated to the choir from Scandinavian composers. The ensemble has toured both at home and abroad in cooperation with festivals, soloists and ensembles within many genres and contexts. Among these partners are soprano Anna Netrebko, electronica composer Mike Sheridan, Athelas Sinfonietta Copenhagen and Baroque Ensemble Camarata Oresund.

The choir is every year performing Handel's Messiah in Holmen Church in Copenhagen. Mogens Dahl Chamber Choir was nominated for DR P2's Prize in 2008:

== Discography ==
- 2010 NORTH ROOM, ecclesiastical and secular, Nordic choral music
- 2008 SACRED NORTH, ecclesiastical, Nordic choral music
- 2008 NORTH secular, Nordic choral music
- 2007 Liebeslieder, choral music by Brahms
- 2006 Højskolesange, traditional Danish songs
- 2005 Happy Christmas, lovely Christmas. Nordic Christmas carols and songs
