= Undine Smith Moore =

American classical composer (1904–1989)

- Prof. Smith Moore
- Born: Undine Eliza Anna Smith; August 25, 1904
- Died: February 6, 1989 (aged 84)
- Education: Fisk University, Columbia University
- Occupations: Composer, educator
- Employer: Virginia State University
- Spouse: James Arthur Moore (m. 1938)
- Children: 1

Undine Eliza Anna Smith Moore (25 August 1904 – 6 February 1989), the "Dean of Black Women Composers", was an American composer and professor of music in the twentieth century. Moore was originally trained as a classical pianist, but developed a compositional output of mostly vocal music—her preferred genre. Much of her work was inspired by black spirituals and folk music. Undine Smith Moore was a renowned teacher, and once stated that she experienced "teaching itself as an art". Towards the end of her life, she received many awards for her accomplishments as a music educator.

== Biography ==
=== Early life ===
Undine Eliza Anna Smith was born the youngest of three children to James William Smith and Hardie Turnbull Smith. Her father had worked on a plantation prior to the Civil War, after which he became a brakeman employed by the Norfolk and Western Railroad. Her mother, although not formally educated, was a music lover and avid reader. Undine was the granddaughter of slaves. In 1908, her family moved to Petersburg, Virginia. Her hometown of Jarratt, Virginia, consisted of a large African-American population, and she would later recall memories of the community singing and praying at the Morningstar Baptist Church. Of her childhood, she said that "above all else, music reigned." She was also a member of Alpha Kappa Alpha sorority.

=== Education ===
At age seven, Undine Smith began taking piano lessons under Lillian Allen Darden, who later encouraged her to attend Fisk University, where she studied piano and organ with Alice M. Grass and theory with Sara Leight Laubenstein. Smith turned down a scholarship to Petersburg's Virginia Normal Institute in order to enroll at Fisk, a historically black college. In 1924, the Juilliard School granted Smith their first ever scholarship to a student at Fisk, allowing her to continue her undergraduate studies. Moore graduated cum laude in 1926.

In 1931, during the Harlem Renaissance, Smith received a Master of Arts and professional diploma in music at Columbia University's Teachers College. From 1952–53, Moore studied composition with Howard Murphy at the Manhattan School of Music, and would often attend composition workshops at the Eastman School of Music.

=== Career ===
Although her teachers encouraged her to continue her studies by enrolling at the Juilliard School, Undine Smith Moore instead took a job as supervisor of music in the public schools in Goldsboro, North Carolina. In 1927, Moore was hired to teach piano and organ at Virginia State College (now Virginia State University) in Petersburg, where she was also assigned with teaching classes in counterpoint and theory, for which she was "particularly renowned". The college appointed Moore director of the D. Webster Davis Laboratory High School chorus, and due to the school's low budget, Moore would write her own music to cater towards the students' needs.

In 1938, Smith married Dr. James Arthur Moore, the chair of the physical education department at Virginia State College. The couple often performed together in recitals, as James Moore was a trained vocalist. On January 4, 1941, Moore gave birth to her only child, a daughter, Mary Hardie Moore.

In 1969, Smith Moore and Altona Trent Johns become co-founders of the Black Music Center at Virginia State College, which aimed to educate members about the "contributions of black people to the music of the United States and the world." Aside from teaching, Moore considered the Center to be her "most significant accomplishment. In 1972, the Black Music Center closed after Smith Moore retired from Virginia State College. She traveled widely as a professor and lectured on black composers and also conducted workshops. Moore was a visiting professor at Carleton College and the College of Saint Benedict, and an adjunct professor at Virginia Union University during the 1970s.

She continued her teaching career as a distinguished professor at Virginia Union University until 1976, meanwhile teaching at multiple colleges in Minnesota. She taught various musicians including Camilla Williams, Billy Taylor, and Phil Medley.

=== Honors ===
In 1973, Smith Moore was presented with the Humanitarian award from Fisk University. In 1975, Moore was labeled music laureate of the state of Virginia, and the National Association of Negro Musicians named her an "outstanding educator". Indiana University and Fisk University awarded her an honorary doctorate the following year. Smith Moore's contributions to music were recognized by the National Black Caucus, and, in 1981, Moore was invited to deliver the keynote address at the first National Congress on Women in Music at New York University. Among her many awards was a Candace Award from the National Coalition of 100 Black Women in 1984. She was given the Virginia Governor's Award in the Arts in 1985.

=== Death ===
On February 6, 1989, aged 84, Smith Moore suffered a fatal stroke. At her funeral, several of her spiritual arrangements were performed. She was buried in the Eastview Cemetery in Petersburg, Virginia. A composition by Adolphus Hailstork, "I Will Lift Up Mine Eyes", was created in 1989 to honor her memory. A historical marker was approved in 2010 for installation in Petersburg. Moore was named one of the Virginia Women in History for 2017.

== Music ==
=== Style ===
Looking back at her years at Fisk University, Undine Smith Moore described her early compositions, especially her piano music, as having a general similarity to the music of Leopold Godowsky. Her compositional style did not "include any African American elements", and Moore did not produce much music until 1953 (during her studies with Howard Murphy), when a "marked change in style took place". Moore would transcribe melodies that her mother sang, which gradually inspired her use of African-American spirituals in her music. Of these melodies and her adaptations of them to her music, Moore said:

...the songs my mother sang while cooking dinner; the melodies my father hummed after work moved me very deeply… In making these arrangements my aim was not to make something ‘better’ than what was sung. I thought them so beautiful that I wanted to have them experienced in a variety of ways -- by concert choirs, soloists, and by instrumental groups.

In 1953, Moore composed the "powerful and dissonant" piano solo Before I'd be a Slave, "characterized by tone clusters, bitonality, and quartal harmonies"—a significant step away from her tonal vocal writing. Moore acknowledged that there was "almost always strong contrapuntal influence" in her music, which began leaning towards a more dissonant counterpoint after 1953. Helen Walker-Hill, author of From Spirituals to Symphonies, writes that Moore's compositional style was "freely tonal… sometimes strongly modal, often using twentieth-century techniques…, frequently using recitative… style, almost always strongly contrapuntal, and dominated by the black idiom." As for the influence of African-American traditional music, Walker-Hill writes:

[Moore’s] ‘black idiom’ was the use of additive and syncopated rhythms, scale structures with gaps, call and response antiphony, rich timbres, melody influenced by rhythm, the frequent use of the interval of the third and, less frequently, fourths and fifths, nonhomophonic textures, and the ‘deliberate use of striking climax with almost unrestrained fullness.’

In a volume of The Choral Journal, Carl Harris analyzes Moore's music as being influenced by "ragtime, blues, jazz, and gospel music". Moore herself, however, only acknowledged "black folk music and Bach as true influences". Of the philosophy of her music, Smith Moore stated:

...in retrospect, it seems I have often been concerned with aspiration, the emotional intensity associated with the life of black people as expressed in the various rites of the church and black life in general – the... desire for abundant, full expression as one might anticipate or expect from an oppressed people determined to survive.

=== Compositions ===
Smith Moore's works range "from arrangements of spirituals, to solo art songs, instrumental chamber music, and multimovement works for chorus, soloists, and instruments." Although she composed more than one hundred pieces between 1925 and 1987, only twenty-six were published during her lifetime. Moore wrote over 50 choral works, 21 compositions for solo voice and accompaniment, and 18 instrumental pieces. Most of this work occurred after 1950. The 1970s were Moore's "most prolific" years, with twenty-seven works composed.

In 1981, Moore's Pulitzer Prize-nominated oratorio, Scenes from the Life of a Martyr, was premiered at Carnegie Hall. The 16-part oratorio is based on the life of the Reverend Dr. Martin Luther King Jr. and written for chorus, orchestra, solo voices and narrator. Moore had planned the piece for at least five years, and considered it her "most significant work".

== Philosophy ==
Undine Smith Moore was outspoken on her thoughts surrounding the Civil Rights Movement and the impact it had on her music. In her youth, Moore experienced the full effect of the Jim Crow era. On looking back at her life, she later stated:

One of the most evil effects of racism in my time was the limits it placed upon the aspirations of blacks, so that though I have been ‘making up’ and creating music all my life, in my childhood or even in college I would not have thought of calling myself a composer or aspiring to be one.

...all liberation is connected… as long as any segment of the society is oppressed… the whole society must suffer.

Moore was a strong advocate for the promotion of black music and art: in her opinion, art could be used as "a powerful agent for social change". Moore was careful to point out that because of the social issues surrounding African-Americans, their music and art could be stereotyped:

I use the term black music to describe music created mainly by people who call themselves black, and whose compositions in their large or complete body show a frequent, if not preponderant, use of significant elements derived from the Afro-American heritage. ...black music is, in its simplest and broadest terms, simply music written by a black person.

== Selected works ==
=== Piano solo ===
- Valse Caprice (1930)
- Before I'd Be a Slave (1953)

=== Organ solo ===
- Organ Variations on Nettleton (1976)

=== Chamber ensemble ===
- Introduction, March and Allegro, for piano and clarinet (1958)
- Three Pieces for Flute and Piano (1958)
- Afro-American Suite, for two flutes, cello, and piano (1969)
- Soweto (1987)

=== Voice(s) and piano ===
- Watch and Pray (1972)
- To be Baptized (1973)
- Lyric for TrueLove (1975)
- Come Down Angels and Trouble the Water (1978)
- Is There Anybody Here That Loves My Jesus (1981)

=== Chorus ===
- Daniel, Daniel, Servant of the Lord, SATB divisi (1953)
- Long Fare You Well, SATB divisi (1960)
- Tambourines to Glory, SATB (1973)
- Lord, We Give Thanks to Thee, SATB (1973)
- I Believe This Is Jesus, SATB (1977)
- Oh, That Bleeding Lamb, SATB divisi (1977)
- Walk through the Streets of the City SSATB (1977)
- We Shall Walk through the Valley, SATB (1977)
- I'm Going Home, SATB divisi, opt. soprano solo (1978)
- Lord, Have Mercy, SATB (1978)
- I Would Be True, SAB (1979)
- I Will Trust in the Lord, SATB divisi with solos (1989)

=== Chorus and orchestra ===
- Sir Olaf and the Erl King's Daughter (1925)
- Glory to God (1979)
- Scenes from the Life of a Martyr (1981)

== Recordings ==
- "Daniel, Daniel, Servant of the Lord", on Steal Away: The African American Concert Spiritual (2016).
- Suite for Flute, Cello, and Piano on Songs for the Soul: Chamber Music by African American Composers (2010).
- "Before I'd be a Slave" on Soulscapes (2007).
- "Mother to Son" (1955), "We Shall Walk Through the Valley" (1977), "Tambourines to Glory" (1973), on Vocalessence Witness – Dance Like the Wind (2004).
- "To Be Baptised" (1973), "Set Down!" (1951), "I Want To Die While You Love Me" (1975), "Come Down Angels" (1978), on Ah! Love, But a Day – Songs and Spirituals of American Women (2000).
- "To be Baptized" and "Watch and Pray". On The Angels Bowed Down: African American Spirituals.
- "Come Down Angels and Trouble the Water" (1978), "I am in Doubt" (1981), "Watch and Pray" (1973), "Love Let the Wind Cry How I Adore Thee" (1961), on Watch and Pray (1994).
- "Tambourines to Glory" and "We Shall Walk through the Valley". On Dance like the Wind: Music of Today's Black Composers.
