= The Phoenix Boys Choir =

Arizona based choir

The Phoenix Boys Choir is a boys' choir based in Phoenix, Arizona.

== History ==
Founded in 1947 by Dr. Harvey K Smith, the Phoenix Boys Choir has programs featuring training in voice, music theory, and performance for boys age 7 to 14. Currently, there are approximately 125 young boys and men participating. In 2023, the choir marked its 75th anniversary.

== Performances ==
Each year the choir performs a full and varied season, beginning in the early fall and ending in late May or early June, followed by their annual concert tour.

Of all of the choir's annual performances, one of the most attended and highly publicized are their series of Holiday concerts performed in December. These concerts are performed in churches and concert halls across the Valley of the Sun and contain both Christmas and Hanukkah pieces. In recent years the choir has been invited to sing annually at the Arizona Biltmore Resort's tree lighting ceremony.

The choir performs a classics concert—usually in February—featuring traditional pieces in the boys' choir repertoire and one or two annual Pops concerts—usually in May. The program of the pops concert generally is culled from the traditions of Americana, the American Songbook, Broadway show tunes, and pieces from contemporary film, television, and other popular outlets. These concerts often feature a special guest performer.

== Current conductors and staff ==
Herbert Washington became the artistic director of the choir in June 2019 upon the retirement of Georg Stangelberger. Herbert has been both a boys' choir member under Dr. Smith as well as having directed the Cadet and Masters choirs in previous years under Maestro Stangelberger.

Travis White is the current conductor of the Cadet Choir, and Kirk Douglas is the current conductor of the Town Choir.

== Previous conductors and staff ==
Georg Stangelberger (1999–2019) joined the Phoenix Boys Choir as artistic director in 1999 upon the retirement of Dr. Smith. He graduated from the Musikhochschule in Vienna and spent more than 13 years with the Vienna Boys Choir, where he served as a principal choir conductor and associate artistic director. He led the Phoenix Boys Choir to its Carnegie Hall debut in 2003. He had returned to Austria.

Harvey K. Smith (1960–1999) served as Artistic Director Emeritus after his retirement in 1999. A native Arizonan, Dr. Smith received his education at Occidental College, Master of Music at the University of Southern California, Doctor of Musical Arts at the University of Arizona, and Honorary Doctor of Letters at Grand Canyon University. Dr. Smith and his wife, Dorothy Lincoln-Smith, worked as clinicians upon his retirement from the choir, were avid scuba divers, and co-authors of the video teaching series Singing and Growing. He died December 12, 2012, at age 76, after a long battle with Parkinson's disease.

== Levels ==
There are five levels of the Phoenix Boys Choir, of increasingly advanced singers.

Boys as young as 7 audition and begin their choir careers in the Cadet Choir, the lowest level. The Cadet Choir is divided into four Neighborhood Choirs, each under the direction of a different conductor and meeting at separate locations. Currently there are Neighborhood Choirs located in Peoria, downtown Phoenix, Tempe, and one at that meets at the choir's headquarters in the Helen C. Lincoln Building on Missouri Avenue.

The Town Choir is senior to the Cadet Choir. Boys in this choir are exposed to their first touring experiences. They embark annually on a national tour but do not travel internationally. Previous tours have gone to Texas, New Mexico, and Northern Arizona.

The Tour Choir is the Phoenix Boys Choir's highest level. Members range in age from 10 to 14 years old and are the most advanced, most accomplished singers in the program. Each year they perform an extensive tour, alternating national and international itineraries.

Boys older than 14 whose voices have changed are graduated to the Young Men's Ensemble.

The Masters choir, also conducted by Georg Stangelberger is a choir for boys who have graduated from the choir.

== Discography ==
- Merry Arizona 97: Desert Stars Shine at Christmas (1997)
