= Hult Center for the Performing Arts =

Performing arts venue in Eugene, Oregon, US

- The Hult Center
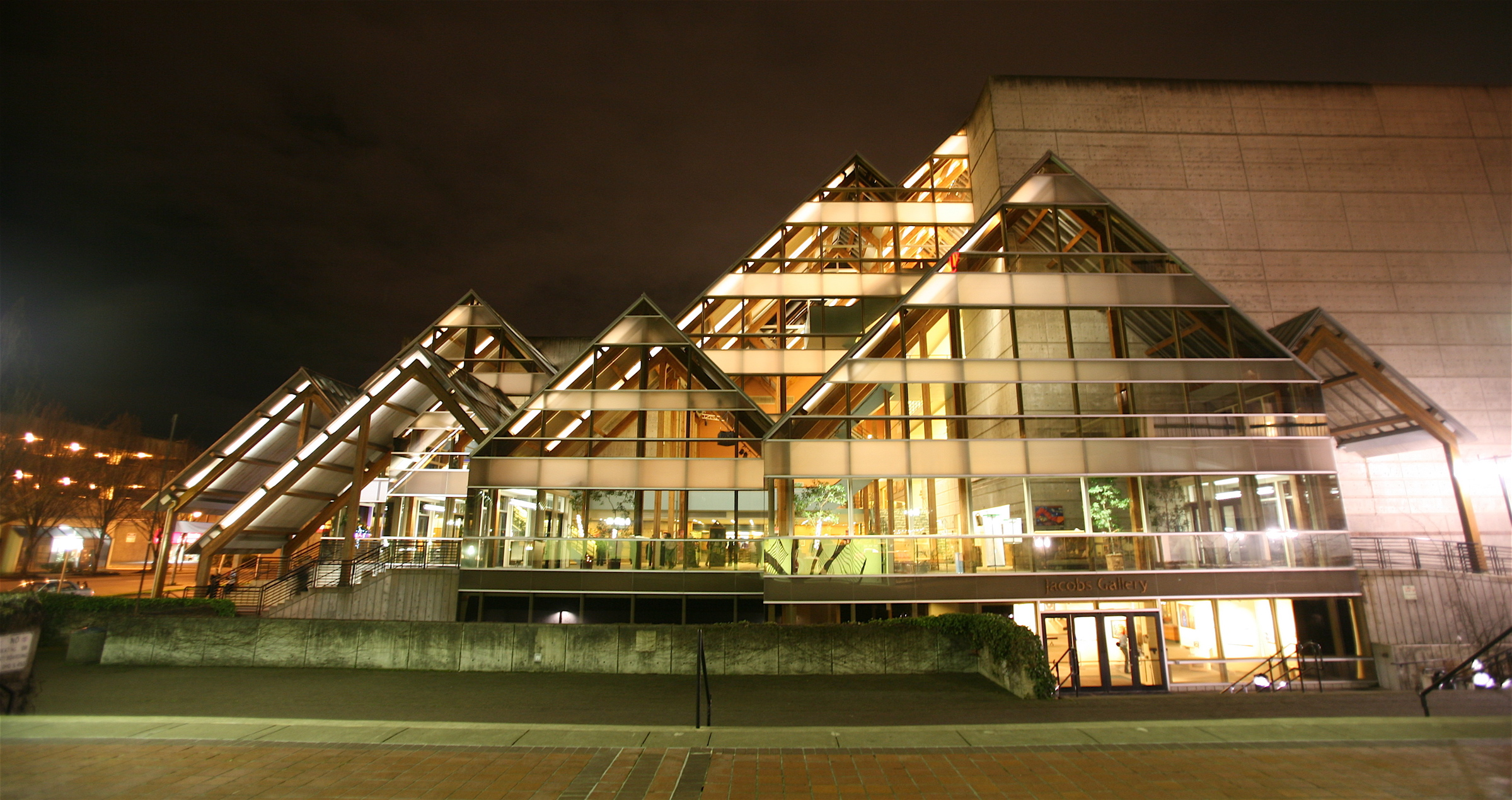
- The Hult Center at night

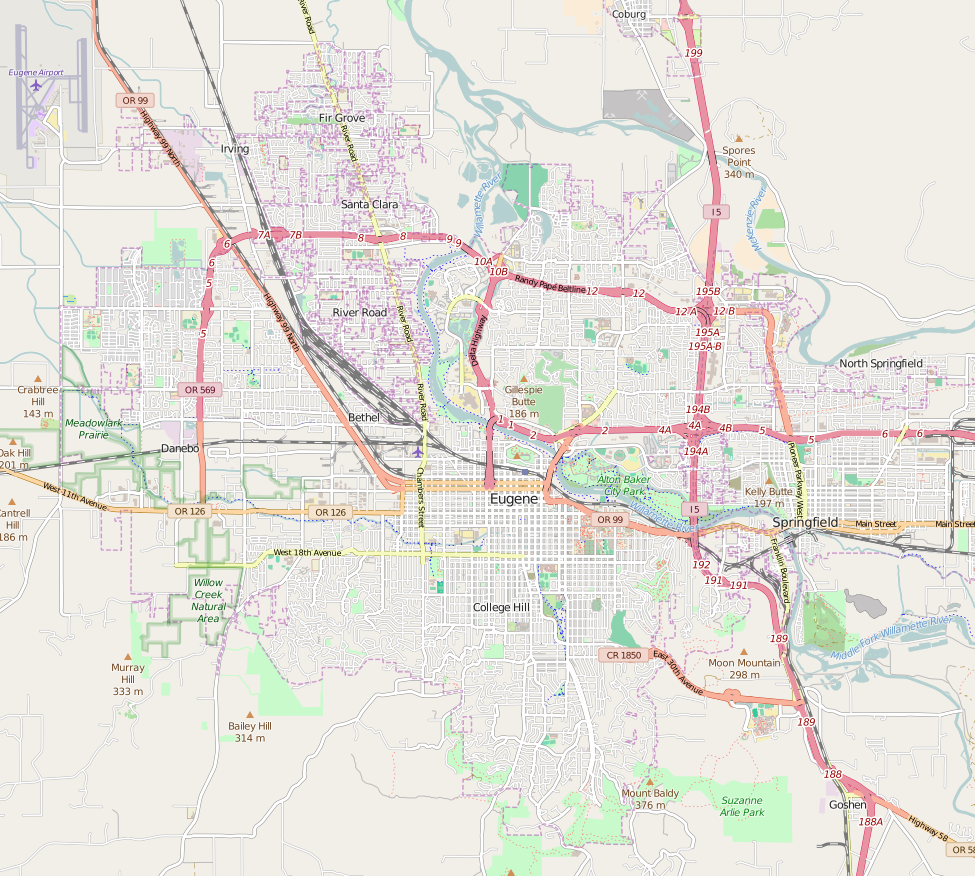
- Location in Eugene, Oregon Hult Center for the Performing Arts (Oregon)
- Address: One Eugene Center, Eugene OR, 97401
- Location: On Willamette Street, between 6th & 7th Avenues
- Coordinates: 44.0526°N 123.0932°W
- Owner: City of Eugene, Oregon, Cultural Services Division
- Seating type: Reserved seating
- Capacity: 2,448 (Silva Concert Hall); 498 (Soreng Theater); 200 (The Studio)
- Type: concert venue, performing arts venue, theater

Construction
- Built: 1982

Website
- www.hultcenter.org

The Hult Center for the Performing Arts is a performing arts venue in Eugene, Oregon.

The Hult Center is located downtown on Willamette Street between 6th & 7th Avenues, adjacent to the Graduate Eugene (previously Hilton Eugene) and Conference Center. Built using funds that were approved by voters in 1978, the Hult Center and the Hilton were completed in 1982 as part of the same urban renewal project.

The Hult Center is operated by the City of Eugene and is one of two performing arts venues owned by the City. Cuthbert Amphitheater, located in Eugene's Alton Baker Park, is also owned by the City and is operated by Kesey Enterprises.

Twenty-seven architectural firms competed for the opportunity to design the center, but in the end, the Eugene City Council awarded the contract to the New York firm of Hardy Holzman Pfeiffer Associates. The firm had previously designed the $7.5-million, 2,700-seat Minneapolis Orchestra Hall and the $13-million Boettcher Concert Hall at the Denver Center for the Performing Arts.

== Performance and other facilities ==
The Hult Center houses 2 performance halls, a meeting venue and a variety of public art:

- Silva Concert Hall, 2,448 seats
- Soreng Theater, 495 seats
- The Studio, capacity 200
- Jacobs Community Room
- The Cuthbert Amphitheater, in Eugene's Alton Baker Park, approximately 5,000 seats.

== Resident companies ==
Resident companies at the Hult Center must satisfy a minimum number of performance and audience attendance requirements. In return, they enjoy certain priority scheduling privileges, hall rental discounts and the ability to apply for funding from the Hult Endowment Fund of Oregon Community Foundation. The residency requirements are not always easy to achieve or maintain, and as of 2026 both Eugene Opera and the Oregon Bach Festival have lost this status. The current resident companies are:

- Ballet Fantastique
- Eugene Ballet
- Eugene Concert Choir
- Eugene Symphony

== See also ==
- List of concert halls
- List of contemporary amphitheatres
