= Oregon Mozart Players =

Oregon Mozart Players (OMP)
- Chamber orchestra
- Founded: 1983
- Location: Eugene, OR,
- Concert hall: Beall Concert Hall
- Principal conductor: Kelly Kuo
- Website: www.oregonmozartplayers.org

Oregon Mozart Players is a professional chamber orchestra based in Eugene, Oregon, United States. The orchestra presents five concert sets in a typical season, in addition to numerous small ensemble performances and recitals by guest artists. Orchestral repertoire ranges from the Baroque period to world premieres of 21st century works. Soloists with the group include internationally acclaimed artists as well as members of the orchestra. The current conductor and artistic director is Kelly Kuo.

== History ==
The organization was founded in 1983 in Eugene by a group of professional musicians, many from the University of Oregon, who wanted to play the wealth of music written for small orchestras and intimate venues and who recognized that they could do so and could bring this music to the Eugene-Springfield community by forming their own orchestra. Today, many of OMP's performances take place at Beall Concert Hall at the University of Oregon.

At first, the organization functioned as a sort of musicians' cooperative, but after a few years it established a non-profit organization with a board of directors and modest staff. In keeping with the group's roots, the corporation bylaws specify that as many as six musicians, elected by the players, may sit on the board of directors, and the board's vice president must be a player.

The orchestra's conductors and music directors have included Robert Hurwitz, Apo Hsu, Andrew Massey and Glen Cortese. A number of other distinguished musicians have served as guest conductors. In 2023 Brian McWhorter became executive director of the Oregon Mozart Players.

The Mozart Players encourage an appreciation of classical music among young people, as both listeners and performers. OMP musicians, including the conductor and guest artists, are also available to visit schools, meet with students, and share their enthusiasm for the music performed in concerts.

In addition to season concerts held at Beall Hall, the Mozart Players offers an annual Candlelight Baroque Concert, currently held at the United Methodist Church of Eugene.
