= Russell Johnson (acoustician) =

American architect

- Born: Frederick Russell Johnson; September 14, 1923; Berwick, Pennsylvania
- Died: August 7, 2007 (aged 83)
- Education: Carnegie Mellon University, Yale
- Occupation: Architect

Frederick Russell Johnson (September 14, 1923 – August 7, 2007) was an architect and acoustical expert. He was the founder of Artec Consultants Incorporated in 1970. Nicknamed the "guardian of the ear" by Jean Nouvel in 1998 and an "acoustic guru" by others, Johnson was best known for works that included technical designs for the Morton H. Meyerson Symphony Center in Dallas, Texas, Jazz at Lincoln Center in New York, New Jersey Performing Arts Center, Centre in the Square in Canada, Pikes Peak Center in Colorado, Chan Centre for the Performing Arts in Canada and the Kravis Center for the Performing Arts in Florida.

Johnson advanced the field of acoustic design and theater planning by developing adjustable sonic reflectors hanging from the ceiling of his halls to adjust sound depending upon the performer. The reflectors combined with a traditional shoebox shape design are considered trademarks of his firm. Since 1970 Artec has collaborated on the designs for some of the most renowned concert halls, opera houses, theatres, and other performance spaces of the 20th century and have created technical designs for over 21,000 projects worldwide including the Kimmel Center for the Performing Arts, Sala São Paulo in Brazil, Culture and Congress Center in Switzerland, the Morton H. Meyerson Symphony Center and Birmingham Symphony Hall in England.

In 2004, Time magazine referred to Johnson as a "legendary" acoustician and his design of the acclaimed Esplanade – Theatres on the Bay (concert hall plus opera theatre) in Singapore as "one of the best anywhere". Johnson was published for decades in the New York Times for his many concert hall designs. He was praised by publications including the Wall Street Journal, The Independent, Wired, Variety, and the Los Angeles Times.

== Career ==
After Yale, Johnson entered the field of acoustics and theatre planning. From 1954 to 1970, he worked for Bolt, Beranek and Newman in Cambridge, Massachusetts. The firm was the country's first large commercial acoustical consulting firm and was founded by physicists trained at Harvard and the Massachusetts Institute of Technology. He worked there as founder and principal consultant of the Theatre Consulting Division, and as technical coordinator for concert hall and opera house design, including acoustics. In 1970, Johnson decided to start his own firm, initially called Russell Johnson & Associates, and later renamed Artec Consultants Inc.

Some of the early acclaimed facilities on which Johnson worked include the Orchestra Shell Renovation, Derngate Centre, Grand Theatre de Quebec, Centennial Concert Hall, Crouse-Hinds Concert Theater, Hamilton Place in Canada, Tampa Bay Performing Arts Center, and Place des Arts.

As chairman Johnson also led Artec on projects such as the Harpa in Reykjavík, the Winspear Centre in Edmonton, Domaine Forget in Charlevoix and acoustical upgrade of the Roy Thomson Hall. He revolutionized the profession with adjustable equipment that could create different acoustic environments for different performance types.

He studied the history of concert hall design and concluded that the best halls were built between about 1840 and 1905. After then, demand arose for concert halls that could serve multiple purposes, hosting symphonies as well as music theater, choral societies, and lectures. Smaller auditoriums gave way to venues that could hold 3,000 to 4,000 people. These trends, Johnson believed, led to acoustical nightmares. Therefore, he persuaded many owners and architects to return to the basic shape and dimensions of beloved older halls like the Musikverein in Vienna, the Amsterdam Concertgebouw and Symphony Hall in Boston, all of which are shoebox-shaped and relatively small.

Johnson's talents helped make him the go-to person for acoustic design. He worked in collaboration with some of the great architects of the world, including Cesar Pelli, Jean Nouvel, I.M. Pei, Moshe Safdie, Barton Myers, Bing Thom, Michael Wilford, Eberhard Zeidler, Fred Lebensold, Sir James Stirling, Robert Venturi, and Rafael Viñoly.

Johnspn's concert halls and projects include:

- The Palladium, Carmel, Indiana USA
- Orchestra Shell Renovation
- Derngate Centre
- Grand Theatre de Quebec
- Centennial Concert Hall
- Crouse-Hinds Concert Theater
- Hamilton Place in Canada
- Tampa Bay Performing Arts Center
- Place des Arts in Montréal, Canada
- Jazz at Lincoln Center in New York
- New Jersey Performing Arts Center
- Centre in the Square in Canada
- Pikes Peak Center in Colorado
- Chan Centre for the Performing Arts in Canada, along with Bing Thom
- Kravis Center for the Performing Arts in Florida
- Carnival Center for the Performing Arts in Miami with Cesar Pelli
- Kimmel Center for the Performing Arts, Philadelphia
- Sala São Paulo, Brazil
- Culture and Congress Center, Lucerne, Switzerland
- Morton H. Meyerson Symphony Center, Dallas, with I.M. Pei
- Symphony Hall, Birmingham, England
- Esplanade – Theatres on the Bay—Theatres on the Bay, Singapore
- Roy Thomson Hall renovation, Toronto, Ontario, Canada
- Fox Cities Performing Arts Center, Appleton, Wisconsin, USA
- Orange County Performing Arts Center in Costa Mesa

One of the last halls masterminded by Johnson was the César Pelli-designed Renée and Henry Segerstrom Concert Hall in Costa Mesa.

=== Honours ===
- United States Institute for Theatre Technology Award (for lifelong commitment to excellence in architectural acoustics and theatre planning for performing arts spaces), 1996
- Wallace Clement Sabine Medal from the Acoustical Society of America in recognition of his lifetime contribution to advancing the knowledge of architectural acoustics, 1997
- the International Citation of Merit from the International Society of Performing Arts, 1998

== Death ==
On August 9, 2007, Johnson died in his New York City apartment. A funeral service was held in Berwick, Pennsylvania on August 18. A memorial service was held in the Allen Room, Frederick P. Rose Hall, Home of Jazz at Lincoln Center, New York City on November 7, 2007.
