= Adrienne Arsht Center for the Performing Arts =

Performing arts center in Miami, Florida, U.S.

Arsht Center
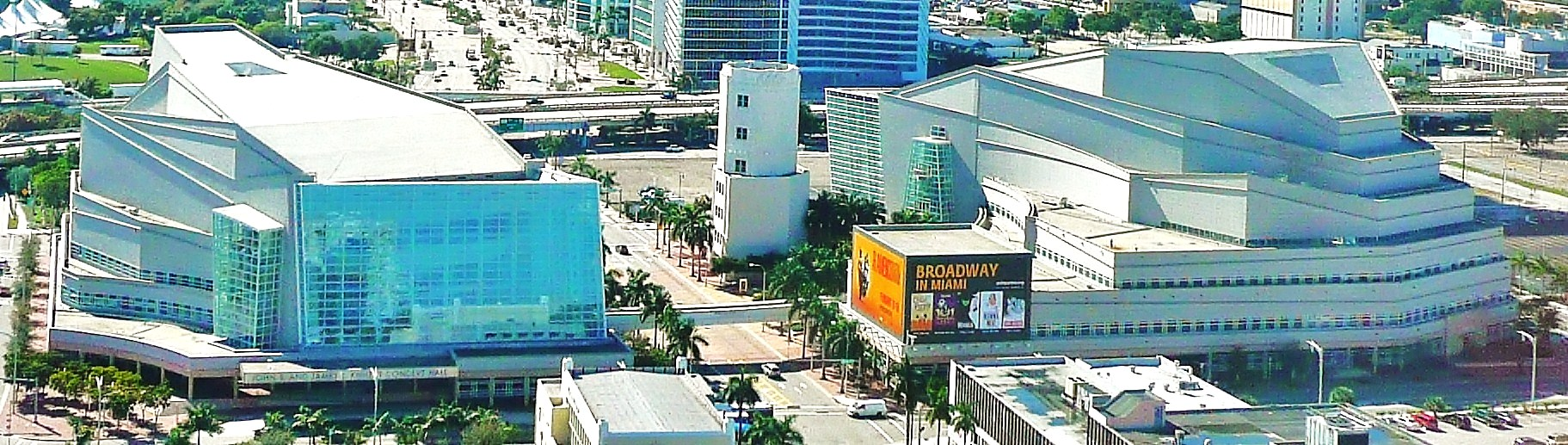
- Adrienne Arsht Center for the Performing Arts, February 2010
- Interactive map of Arsht Center
- Full name: Adrienne Arsht Center for the Performing Arts of Miami-Dade County
- Former names: Miami Performing Arts Center (planning/construction); Carnival Center for the Performing Arts (2006-08)
- Address: 1300 Biscayne Boulevard; Miami, Florida
- Location: Arts & Entertainment District
- Coordinates: 25°47′15″N 80°11′32″W
- Owner: Government of Miami-Dade County
- Public transit: Adrienne Arsht Center

Construction
- Groundbreaking: October 15, 2001
- Opened: October 5, 2006
- Cost: $472 million ($858 million in 2025)

Tenants
- Florida Grand Opera; Miami City Ballet; New World Symphony

Website
- Venue Website
- Building details

Design and construction
- Architects: César Pelli & Associates
- Structural engineer: Ove Arup & Partners
- Services engineer: Cosentini Associates
- Civil engineer: Balmori Associates
- Other designers: Artec Consultants; BDS Steel Detailers; Fisher Dachs Associates; Architects Hall Designers; Frazier & Associates; Tnemec Company; Florida Protective Coatings Consultants; Jasper Enterprises; ADF Steel Fabrication; McGilvray Inc; Poole & Kent Contractors; GHSC; Enclos
- Main contractor: Odebrecht Construction; Haskell; EllisDon

The Adrienne Arsht Center for the Performing Arts of Miami-Dade County is a performing arts center located in Miami, Florida. It is one of the largest performing arts centers in the United States. According to Arts Management Magazine, the Arsht Center presents artists from around the world, innovative programming from its three resident companies and local arts partners, free community events that reflect Miami's identity and arts education experiences for thousands of Miami children each year. Family Fest, Free Gospel Sundays, CommuniTea LGBTQ+ celebration and Heritage Fest are among dozens of free events the Arsht Center presents to bring together people from all walks of life to celebrate each other through the live performing arts. Since 2020, the Arsht Center has presented more than 100 pop-up performances at hospitals, parks and libraries in communities throughout Miami-Dade County.

The center was partly built on the site of a former Sears department store; an Art Deco building constructed in 1929, predating the Art Deco hotels on Ocean Drive. It was added to the United States National Register of Historic Places in 1997 as Sears, Roebuck and Company Department Store. However, by 2001, the only surviving part of the original structure was the seven-story tower designed by Sears as its store's grand entrance. The department store space itself had been demolished and developers decided to preserve the tower and incorporate it into the new performing arts center.

== History ==
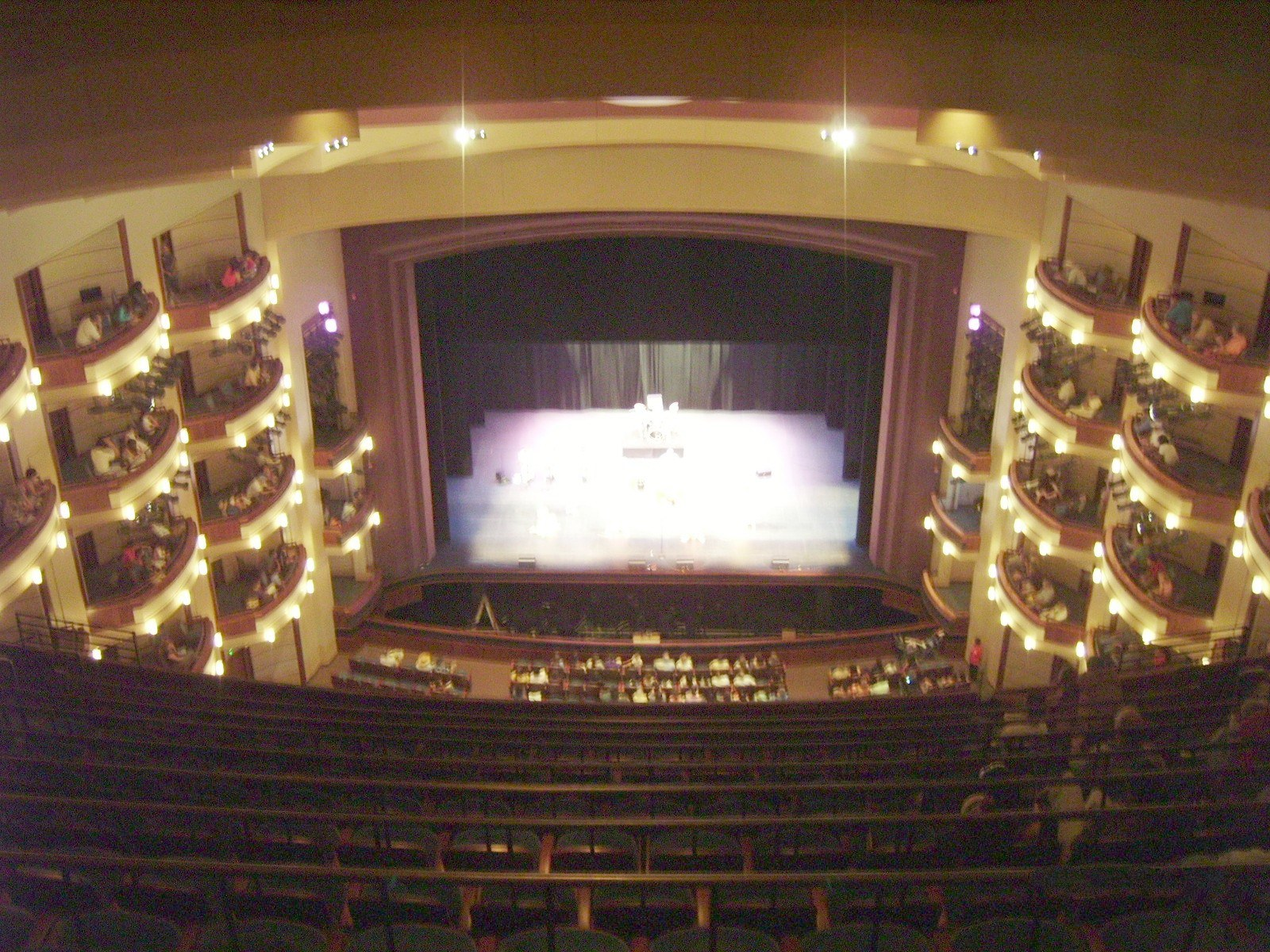
Interior of the Ziff Ballet Opera House

The Center opened as the Carnival Center on October 5, 2006, with performers, politicians and movie stars attending, including Gloria Estefan, Jeb Bush, Andy García, and Bernadette Peters.

On January 10, 2008, it was announced that philanthropist and business leader Adrienne Arsht donated $30 million to the facility that would make it financially stable. In recognition of the gift, the former Carnival Center for the Performing Arts was renamed The Adrienne Arsht Center for the Performing Arts of Miami-Dade County, or the Arsht Center for short.

In December 2008, M. John Richard joined the center as president and CEO after more than 20 years at the New Jersey Performing Arts Center (NJPAC).

Founded in 2011, the Town Square Neighborhood Development Corporation (“TSNDC”) was planned to oversee the development of the Arsht Center district. TSNDC's volunteer board: Armando Codina, chairman of Codina Partners, as chair; Manny Diaz, former City of Miami mayor, as vice chair; Michael Eidson, chairman of the Performing Arts Center Trust Board of Directors and partner of the South Florida law firm Colson Hicks Eidson, as treasurer; and Parker Thomson, founding chair of the Performing Arts Center Trust Board of Directors, as secretary. In 2019, Johann Zietsman succeeded John Richard as president and CEO after ten years in the same role at Arts Commons in Calgary.

In 2016, AileyCamp Miami, run by the Arsht Center, received a 2016 National Arts and Humanities Youth Award Program at the White House.

In 2022, the Arsht Center was nominated for a Latin Grammy for its collaboration with flamenco dancer Siudy Garrido on the documentary Bailaora.

The Adrienne Arsht Center for the Performing Arts, a $470 million component of an ongoing urban revitalization effort in downtown Miami, has catalyzed over $1 billion in economic investments within the local community.

== Architecture & venues ==
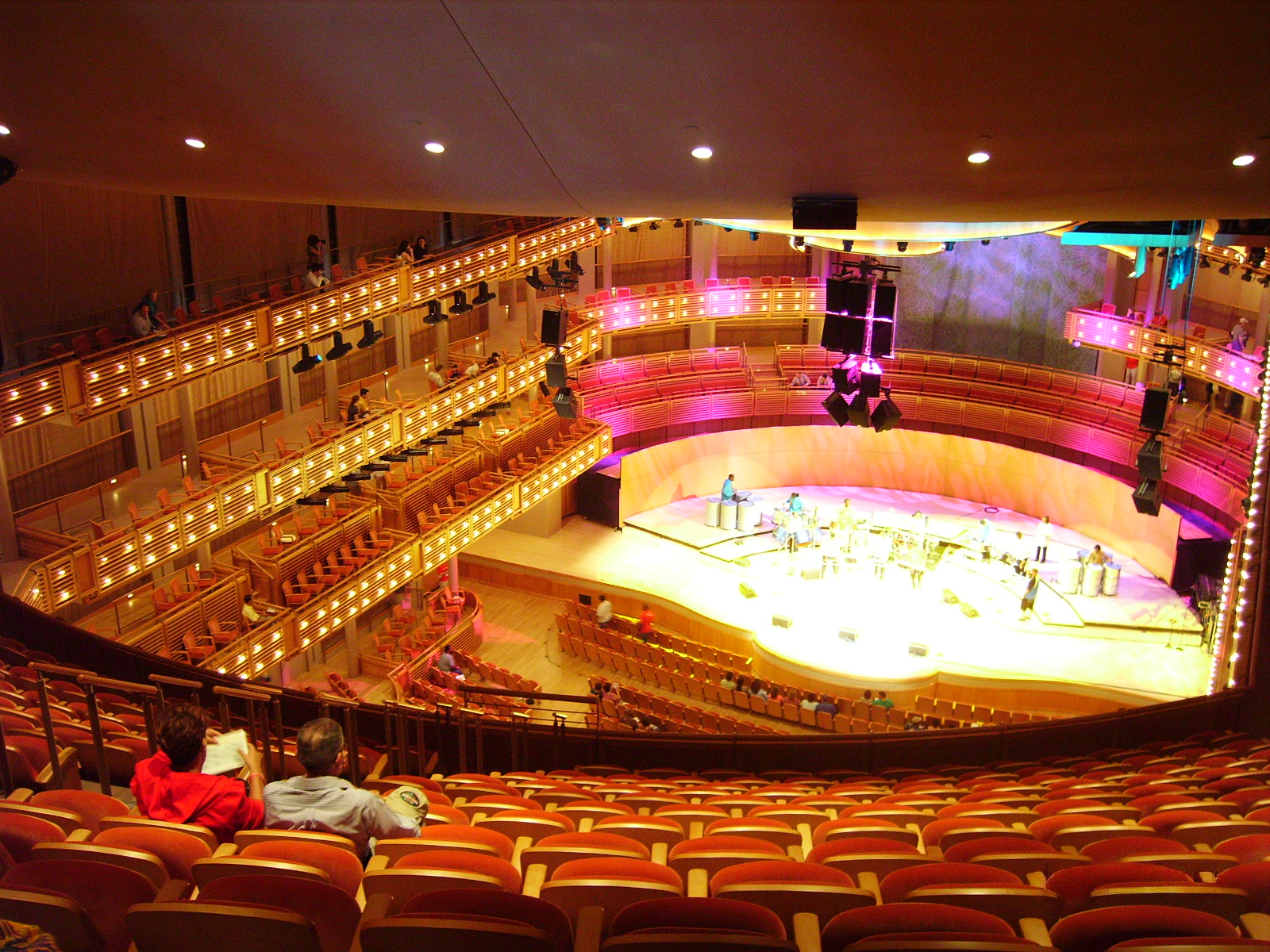
Interior of the Knight Concert Hall

The center was designed by César Pelli and occupies two 570,000 square feet (53,000 m^{2}) sites straddling Biscayne Boulevard connected by a pedestrian bridge. Acoustics were designed by Russell Johnson of Artec Consultants company. He also worked on the Meyerson Symphony Center in Dallas.

There are three main venues all of which can be rented for event space by the public:

- The Sanford and Dolores Ziff Ballet Opera House seats 2,400.
- The John S. and James L. Knight Concert Hall seats 2,200. Its stage extends into the audience and there is seating behind the stage for 200 additional spectators or a chorus. The orchestra level can be transformed into a "Grand Ballroom" with a festival floor configuration for dining and dancing for up to 850 people. The floor is installed over the seats.
- Carnival Studio Theater is a flexible black-box space designed for up to 250 seats.

In addition, there are two smaller multi-purpose venues:

- The Peacock Rehearsal Studio holds 270 people.
- Parker and Vann Thomson Plaza for the Arts is an outdoor social and performance space linking the two main houses across Biscayne Blvd.

Seating Capacity
Ziff Ballet Opera House	2,400
Knight Concert Hall	2,200
Thomson Plaza for the Arts	1,000
Adams Foundation Lobby	600
Ryder System Lobby	400
Peacock Foundation Studio	300
Carnival Studio Theater	297
Peacock Education Center	150
Next Generation Green Room	80
Terra Group Patrons Club	77

== Events and performances ==
Programmatic series include Jazz Roots, Knight Masterworks Classical Music, Theater Up Close, Live at Knight, Flamenco Festival, Family Fest, City Theatre's yearly short play festival Summer Shorts and more. The center hosts approximately 400 performances and events each year that attract an average of 450,000 people to Miami's urban core. More than 85% of the performances at the center are presented by the center.

=== Community and Education ===
Educational programs, many of which are planned with Miami-Dade Public Schools, Miami-Dade County Department of Cultural Affairs, the resident companies, and community-based organizations, offer unique opportunities for young people and adults to learn about and enjoy the performing arts both in the center and out in their communities. Examples include Jazz Roots Sound Check, a program that hosts 1,000 high school jazz musicians for a behind-the-scenes look at a working sound check, an opportunity to jam with artists, a lecture and free concert tickets; AileyCamp Miami, a six-week full-scholarship summer camp which debuted in 2009; and the Learning Through the Arts program, which provides live music, theater and dance experiences to Miami public school children. The Learning Through the Arts programs include three musicals produced by the Arsht Center: Kitty Hawk, I am Me and The Busy Bees’ Great Adventure. The Busy Bees’ Great Adventure premiered in October 2023 and teaches kids about the importance of saving the planet.

=== Presidential Debates ===
The center was the site of the first Democratic primary debate of the 2020 presidential campaign, held on June 26–27, 2019, and was due to host the second of three general election debates in October 2020, but this did not go ahead. President Donald Trump had contracted COVID-19 in the week before the debate and was recovering from it; for reasons of safety, the Commission on Presidential Debates proposed a virtual debate instead but Trump refused to participate. Instead, NBC News held a town-hall style event with President Trump alone, moderated by Savannah Guthrie, within the outdoor portico of the neighbouring Pérez Art Museum; the Democratic nominee, former Vice-president Joe Biden, participated in a simultaneous town-hall debate with George Stephanopoulos for ABC News at the National Constitution Center in Philadelphia, Pennsylvania. The Arsht Center hosted the third Republican primary debate of the 2024 presidential campaign on November 8th 2023.

=== Broadway in Miami series ===
The 2018–2019 Broadway in Miami series included Hello Dolly, Irving Berlin's White Christmas, Les Misérables, Waitress, School of Rock: The Musical, Come From Away, and The Lion King. As a bonus to subscribers of the 2018/19 season, they were promised first access to Hamilton tickets once those went on sale.

2017–2018 shows included On Your Feet!: The Story of Emilio and Gloria Estefan, The Bodyguard, Finding Neverland, The Color Purple, Chicago, and The Book of Mormon.

== See also ==
- List of concert halls
