= Symphony Hall, Birmingham =

Concert hall in Birmingham, England

Symphony Hall
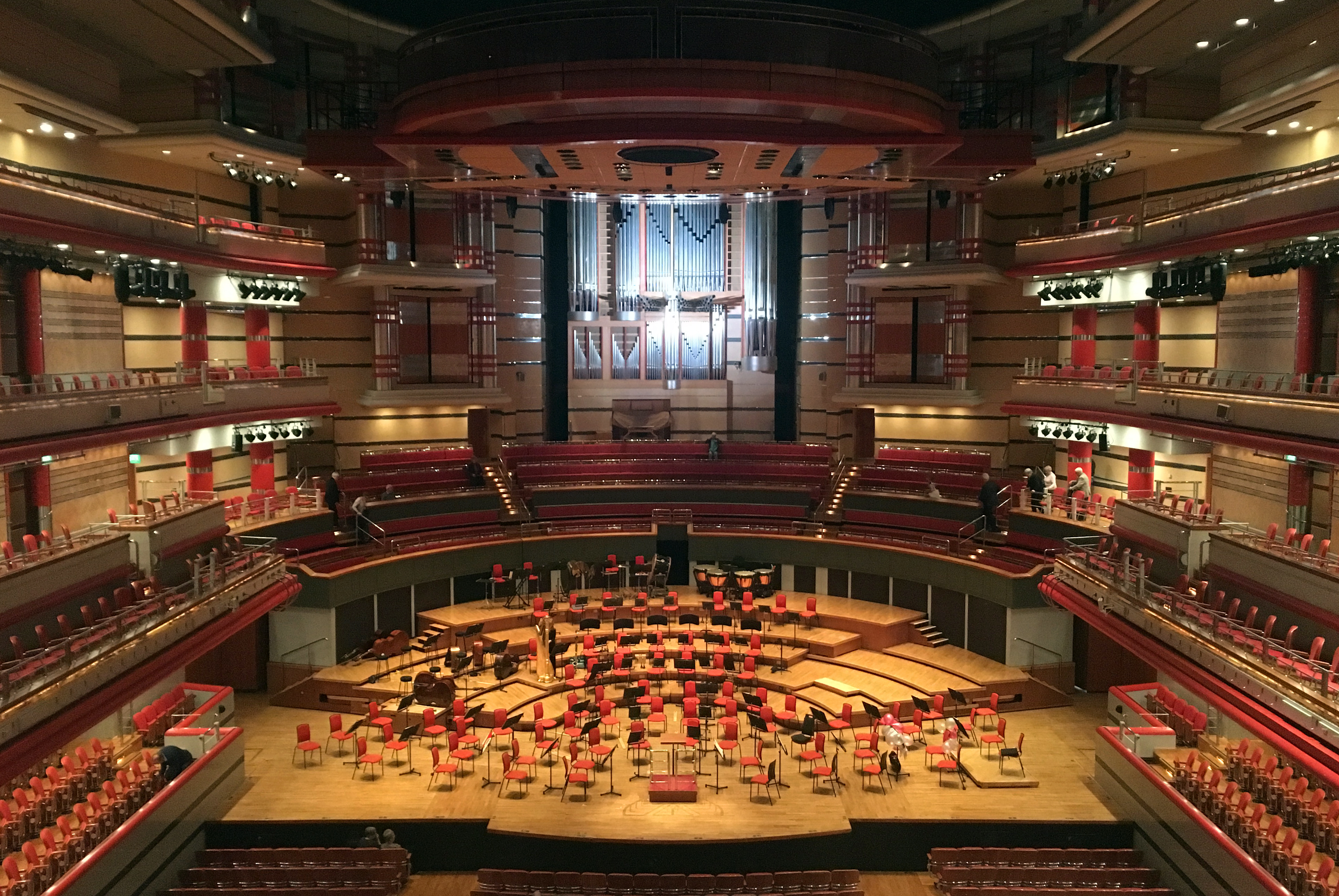
- Symphony Hall platform, organ and movable acoustic canopy
- Interactive map of Symphony Hall
- Location: Broad Street, Birmingham, United Kingdom
- Coordinates: 52°28′43″N 1°54′38″W
- Owner: Performances Birmingham Limited
- Capacity: 2,262
- Type: Concert hall

Construction
- Opened: 1991
- Cost: £30 million
- Architects: Percy Thomas Partnership; Renton Howard Wood Levin

Website
- www.bmusic.co.uk

Symphony Hall is a 2,262-seat concert venue in Birmingham, England. It was officially opened by Queen Elizabeth II on 12 June 1991, although it had been in use since 15 April 1991. It is home to the City of Birmingham Symphony Orchestra and hosts around 270 events a year. It was completed at a cost of £30 million. The hall's interior is modelled on the Musikverein in Vienna and the Concertgebouw in Amsterdam. The venue, managed alongside Birmingham Town Hall, presents a programme of jazz, world, folk, rock, pop and classical concerts, organ recitals, spoken word, dance, comedy, educational and community performances, and is also used for conferences and business events as part of the International Convention Centre.

In 2016 the Concert Hall Acoustics expert Leo Beranek ranked Symphony Hall as having the finest acoustics of the concert halls in the United Kingdom, and the seventh best in the world. Proof of these fine acoustics is that a pre-opening acoustic test demonstrated that if a pin was dropped on stage, the sound could be heard from anywhere in the hall.

== Construction ==
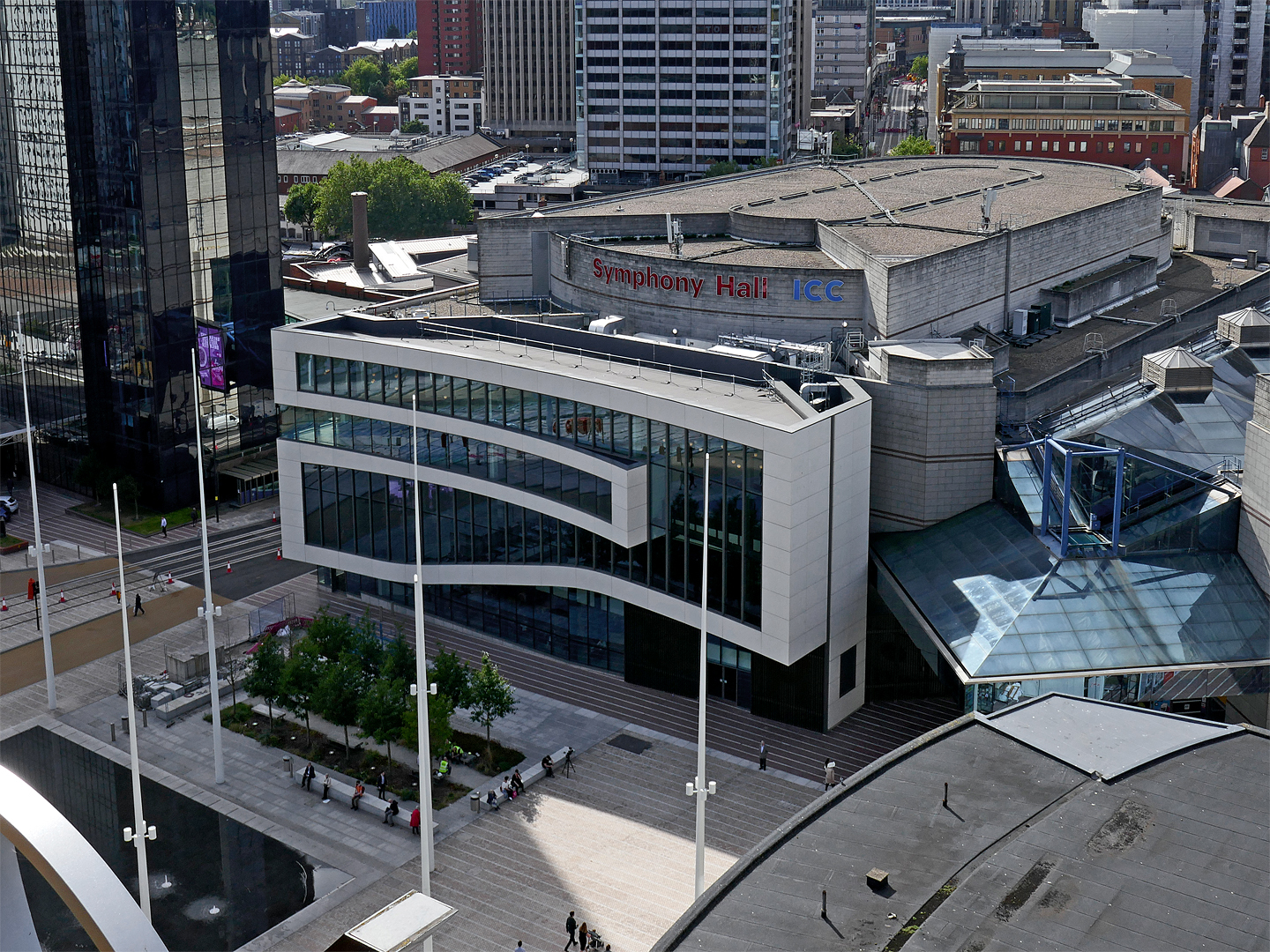
Exterior of the Symphony Hall seen after refurbishment (September 2021)

Symphony Hall was designed by Percy Thomas Partnership and Renton Howard Wood Levin, (who together formed the Convention Centre Partnership for the ICC) with specialist help from Russell Johnson, founder of acoustic consultants Artec. A particularly innovative feature is the hall's acoustic flexibility. It has a reverberation chamber behind the stage and extending high along the sides, adding 50% to the hall's volume, the doors to which can be remotely opened or closed. The U-shaped reverberation chamber area has a volume of 12,700 cubic metres (450,000 cu ft). There is an acoustic canopy which can be raised or lowered above the stage. Dampening panels can be extended or retracted to ensure that the sound of the space is perfectly matched to the scale and style of the music to be performed. There are also reverse fan walls at the rear of the hall which provide further reflections of sound. All the walls and the ceiling are 200 millimetres (8 in) thick and are made of concrete.

The hall is built only 30 metres (100 ft) from a covered railway line. To prevent the transmission of vibrations, the hall is mounted on rubber cushions, as is the railway track. The hall is also shielded from heavy traffic on Broad Street by double skins of concrete. Large, low-speed air ducting cuts the ventilation noise.

In 2001, a 6000-pipe symphony organ was installed, designed and built by Johannes Klais Orgelbau in Bonn and specially tailored to the hall's reverberation chambers. This is now the largest mechanical action organ in the UK.

Through its management company B:Music Limited, Symphony Hall alongside Town Hall has charitable status and through an Education/Community department carries out a number of projects for schools, community groups and families, working with around 12,000 young people and 6,000 adults each year.

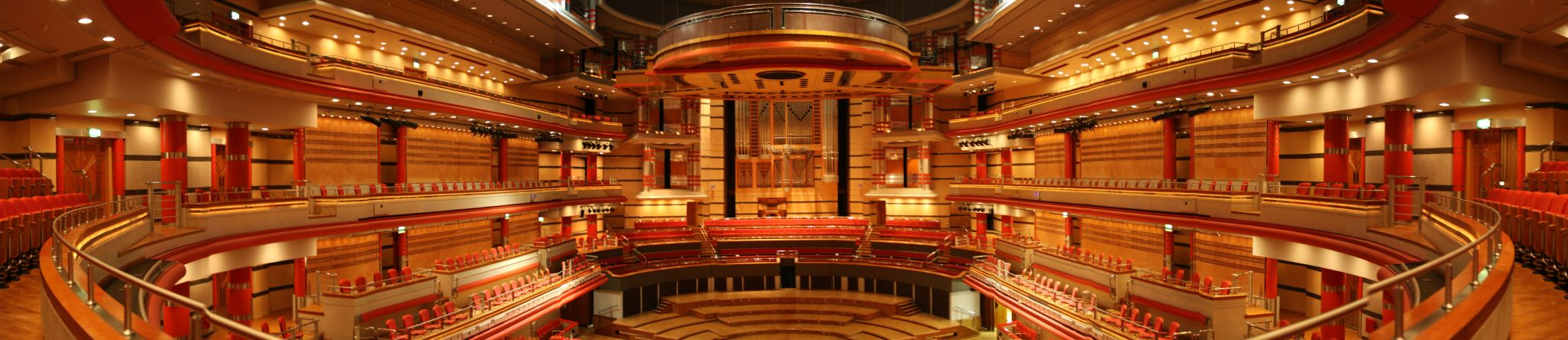
Symphony Hall Interior
