= Raymond B. Allen =

American educator (1902–1986)

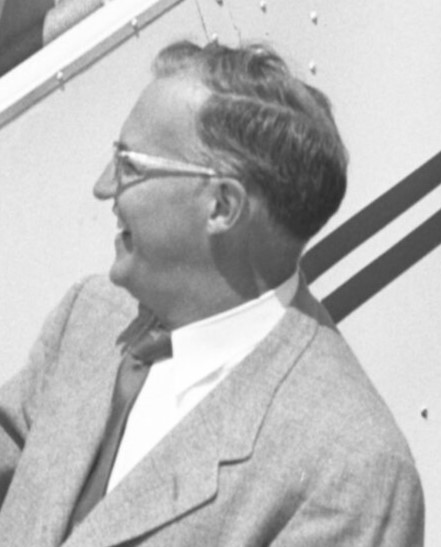
- Allen in 1953

1st Chancellor of the University of California, Los Angeles
- In office 1951–1959
- Preceded by: Clarence Addison Dykstra (Provost)
- Succeeded by: Vern Oliver Knudsen

Personal details
- Born: Raymond Bernard Allen; August 7, 1902 Cathay, North Dakota, U.S.
- Died: March 15, 1986 (aged 83) Fredericksburg, Virginia, U.S.
- Education: University of Minnesota (BA, MD, PhD)
- Occupation: Medical doctor University Chancellor

Raymond Bernard Allen (August 7, 1902 – March 15, 1986) was an American educator. He served as the 21st president of the University of Washington from 1946 to 1951 and as the first chancellor of the University of California, Los Angeles from 1951 to 1959.

== Biography ==
=== Early life ===
Raymond Bernard Allen was born on August 7, 1902, in Cathay, North Dakota. He attended the University of Minnesota, where he received an MD in 1928. He returned to the University of Minnesota in 1930 for his PhD.

=== Career ===
He started his career as a general practitioner in Minot, North Dakota. Initially specializing in urology, Allen entered hospital administration after earning his PhD. In 1933, he became Director of Graduate Studies at the Columbia University College of Physicians and Surgeons. At the same time, he worked as the associate director of New York Post-Graduate Medical School. He later served as dean of the University of Illinois College of Medicine, dean of the Wayne State University School of Medicine and associate dean for graduate studies at the Columbia University College of Physicians and Surgeons.

He served as president of the University of Washington (UW) from 1946 to 1951. He dismissed three Communist professors, arguing that "a Communist is incompetent to teach the truth." However, he refused to give a list of texts taught at UW to the House Un-American Activities Committee and allowed leftist writer Malcolm Cowley to speak at the university. As president, Allen oversaw the early years of the University of Washington School of Medicine, which opened the same year Allen took office. While living in Seattle, Allen was a board member for the Institute of Pacific Relations.

In addition to his work for university hospitals, Allen dedicated time to public service. In 1945, he volunteered for the National Commission for Mental Hygiene, and later served on the Hoover Commission. Allen briefly served as chair of the newly created Armed Forces Medical Policy Council in 1949. He was director of the Psychological Strategy Board in 1952.

When UCLA was granted co-equal status with UC Berkeley in 1951, its presiding officer was granted the title of chancellor. Allen was tapped as the newly autonomous UCLA's first chancellor, a post he held until 1959. He was recommended for the job by Robert Gordon Sproul, who served as president of the University of California, serving from 1930 to 1958. During his tenure, the UCLA Medical Center was built and the Schools of Medicine, Dentistry, and Nursing were developed, as well as the Neuropsychiatric Institute. He resigned after a three-year investigation led to the revelation of corruption between football players and the Pacific Coast Conference.

After leaving UCLA, Allen served as director of research and population dynamics for the Pan American Health Organization, as Indonesia director of the International Cooperation Administration, and as a member of the World Health Organization. He was a Fellow of the Mayo Foundation.

=== Personal life ===
Allen was married to Dorothy Allen. They had two sons, Charles and Raymond B. Allen Jr., and two daughters, Dorothy Allen and Barbara Sheard. He retired in Virginia in 1967. He died on March 15, 1986, in Fredericksburg, Virginia, at the age of eighty-three.

== Bibliography ==
- Medical Education and the Changing Order (Commonwealth Fund, 1946) ASIN B000FMPNXW
- "Communists Should Not Teach in American Colleges". 1949.
