= CPMC =

CPMC may refer to:

- California Pacific Medical Center, a general medical/surgical and teaching hospital in San Francisco, California, U.S.
- Central Park Medical College, a private medical school in Lahore, Pakistan
- Columbia-Presbyterian Medical Center, now known as Columbia University Irving Medical Center, is an academic medical center and the largest campus of NewYork-Presbyterian Hospital in New York City, New York, U.S.
- Conrad Prebys Music Center, music center on the campus of the University of California, San Diego in La Jolla, California, U.S.
