= Conrad Prebys =

Property developer and philanthropist (1933–2016)

- Born: August 20, 1933; South Bend, Indiana
- Died: July 24, 2016 (aged 82)
- Education: Indiana University

Conrad Prebys (August 20, 1933 – July 24, 2016) was a property developer and philanthropist based in San Diego, California.

Prebys was born on August 20, 1933, in South Bend, Indiana, and graduated from Indiana University. He moved to San Diego in 1965 and co-founded Progress Construction. He bought out his partner in 1980. Over the years, Prebys shifted his focus from construction to property ownership. As of 2015 Prebys' Progress Management owned 81 properties in the greater San Diego area and had an estimated net worth of approximately US$1 billion. The Blackstone Group agreed to purchase the Prebys apartment portfolio in 2021.

Prebys owned many apartment buildings, which provided housing for thousands of families with children. Prebys supported local Boys & Girls Clubs, and, in recognition of his contributions, Boys & Girls Club facilities in Escondido, Ramona and Santee were named in his honor.

== Philanthropy ==
Prebys was a philanthropist, and made donations to biomedical research, higher education, and public broadcasting. His donations helped to underwrite the Conrad Prebys Music Center at the University of California, San Diego and the La Jolla–based Sanford Burnham Prebys Medical Discovery Institute, a nonprofit medical research institute. Other donations went to PBS's Masterpiece, the San Diego Zoo, San Diego State University, Indiana University, the Salk Institute for Biological Studies, and Scripps Health.

In December 2004, Conrad Prebys made his first philanthropic gift of $1 million to build the Conrad Prebys Clubhouse in Santee which house the Boys & Girls Clubs of East County.

In support of San Diego State University (SDSU), Prebys donated $20 million to create endowed scholarships that now support costs of attendance for at least 150 students per year. Recipients of Prebys' scholarship funds include those pursuing biomedical research, those practising the creative and performing arts, those inducted into the Guardian Scholars and SDSU Honors programs, and those studying entrepreneurship and leadership. At the time, his was the single largest gift ever made to San Diego State University. The SDSU campus also recently named its student union the Conrad Prebys Aztec Student Union in his honor.

In the summer of 2014, Prebys donated $25 million to the Salk Institute for Biological Studies, to fund "cutting-edge biological research on a wide range of diseases." His gift was the institute's largest, enabling its researchers to pursue breakthrough medical therapies.

Prebys gave his all-time largest gift of $100 million to the Sanford-Burnham Medical Research Institute in June 2015. The gift resulted in the renaming of the institute, which is now known as the Sanford Burnham Prebys Medical Discovery Institute. In October 2015, Prebys donated $20 million to the Indiana University Kelley School of Business to fund the construction of a new campus amphitheater and the Kelley School of Business Conrad Prebys Career Services Center, which began construction in summer 2015.

== Education ==
Prebys graduated with distinction from Indiana University's Kelley School of Business in 1955 with a bachelor's degree in business.

During his time as a student at Indiana University, Prebys was an active member in many student organizations including Delta Upsilon fraternity, Indiana University's Playbill theatre group, the Scabbard and Blade Club, the Army ROTC, and Theta Alpha Phi - the national Theatre Honors Fraternity.

In June 2015 Prebys was awarded an honorary Doctor of Humane Letters from San Diego State University's College of Business Administration.
