= Ning Xiang =

- Born: Xiang Ning; Tianjin, China
- Citizenship: American
- Education: Tianjin University (Tianjin, China; Ruhr-University Bochum, Germany
- Known for: Acoustics; Architectural Acoustics, and Signal Processing in Acoustics
- Awards: Wallace Clement Sabine Medal (2014)
- Scientific career
- Fields: Acoustics; Electrical engineering
- Workplaces: HEAD acoustics GmbH, Herzogenrath, Germany; Fraunhofer Institut fuer Bauphysik, Stuttgart Germany; National Center for Physical Acoustics (NCPA), University of Mississippi; Rensselaer Polytechnic Institute
- Doctoral advisor: Jens Blauert

Ning Xiang (Chinese: 向宁) is a Chinese-American acoustical physicist, former Research Engineer of HEAD acoustics, and former Research Scientist of Fraunhofer Institut fuer Bauphysik, and of National Center for Physical Acoustics (NCPA). He is now Director and full professor of the Graduate Program in Architectural Acoustics at Rensselaer Polytechnic Institute.

He authored a textbook, Acoustics for Engineers, (Springer) with Jens Blauert, and edited Acoustics, Information, and Communication (Springer) with Gerhard Sessler, a memorial volume in honor of Manfred R. Schroeder in 2015. In 2017 he edited Architectural Acoustics Handbook (J. Ross Publishing).

He is an expert in architectural acoustics, and received the Wallace Clement Sabine Medal from the Acoustical Society of America in 2014.

Xiang was born in Tianjin, China to Xiang Yang, a high school principal. He received his undergraduate education studying communication engineering from Tianjin University in Tianjin, China and later received a doctorate in engineering after studying acoustics and communication engineering under Jens Blauert from Ruhr-University Bochum, Germany.

Xiang is a Fellow of the Acoustical Society of America, and a Fellow of the Institute of Acoustics, United Kingdom. He is an associate editor of the Journal of the Acoustical Society of America. He is internationally recognized for his contributions to measurements and analysis techniques, and numerical simulation of sound fields in coupled rooms evidenced by his over 400 publications in journals, magazines, and conference proceedings.

With Jens Blauert he developed binaural scale-modeling since 1991. He developed a new method in 1995 using nonlinear regression for estimating reverberation times. With James Sabatier he successfully applied acoustic-to-seismic coupling in landmine detection. With Manfred R. Schroeder he developed a simultaneous dual channel measurement method using reciprocal maximum-length sequences (2003). He is a promoter of Bayesian analysis in acoustics.

Xiang was visiting professor at Pierre and Marie Curie University (UPMC) in June 2013.

== Books ==
- Acoustics for Engineers (Springer-Verlag, 1st ed. 2008, 2nd ed. 2009. 3rd ed. 2021)
- Architectural Acoustics Handbook (J. Ross Publishing, 2017)
- Acoustics, Information and Communication -- a Memorial Volume in Honor of Manfred R. Schroeder (with co-editor Gerhard Sessler, Springer-Verlag, 2015)
