= Vern Oliver Knudsen =

American acoustical physicist (1893–1974)

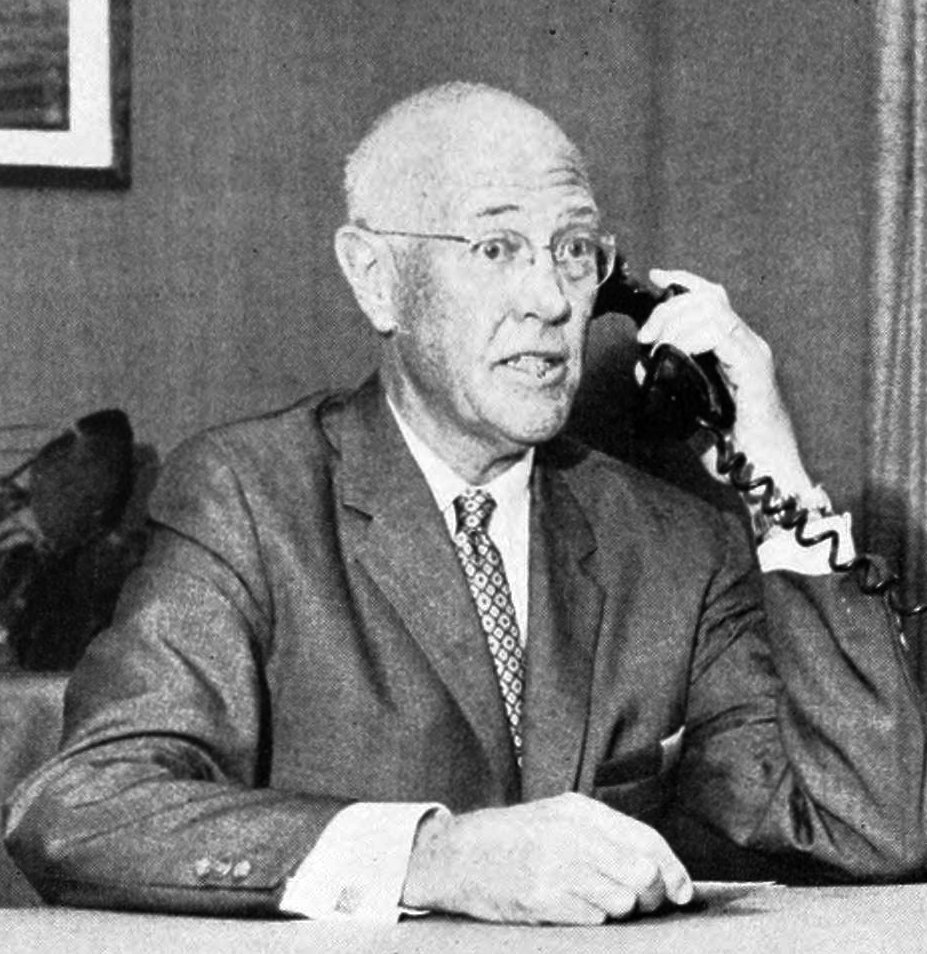
- Vern Knudsen, UCLA Chancellor (1960)

2nd Chancellor of the University of California, Los Angeles
- In office 1959–1960
- Preceded by: Raymond B. Allen
- Succeeded by: Franklin David Murphy

Personal details
- Born: 27 December 1893 Provo, Utah
- Died: 13 May 1974 (aged 80)
- Education: Brigham Young University (BA); University of Chicago (PhD)
- Occupation: Physicist; University Chancellor

Vern Oliver Knudsen (December 27, 1893 – May 13, 1974) was an American acoustical physicist.

== Biography ==
Knudsen received his bachelor's degree from Brigham Young University (BYU) with an A.B. in 1915. Following his graduation from BYU Knudsen served a mission for the Church of Jesus Christ of Latter-day Saints from 1915-1918 in the Northern States Mission, which was headquartered in Chicago. Knudsen then joined the staff of Bell Laboratories where he worked with Harvey Fletcher, who had been one of his professors at BYU.

He received his Ph.D. in physics from the University of Chicago in 1922. Vern Knudsen's publications include two seminal books, Architectural Acoustics, published in 1932, and Acoustical Designing in Architecture, with Cyril M. Harris in 1950.

He co-founded the Acoustical Society of America (ASA), and served as its president, 1933–35, and the ASA awarded him the Wallace Clement Sabine Medal in 1958 and the Gold Medal in 1967. In 1954, he was made an Honorary Fellow of the ASA, an award given to those who have achieved eminence in acoustics. He was the recipient of the John H. Potts (Gold) Medal from the Audio Engineering Society (AES) in 1964.

In 1934, Vern Knudsen was made Dean of the Graduate Division of the Southern Section of the University of California, a post which he held for 24 years and during which time the UCLA Graduate Division increased from 287 to 5160. He served as Chancellor of UCLA from 1959 to 1960, where there is a building named in his honor. Knudsen was the director of the University of California Division of War Research during World War II, he helped improve sonar.
