= Cyril M. Harris =

American architect and academic (1917–2011)

Cyril Manton Harris (June 20, 1917 – January 4, 2011) was Professor Emeritus of Architecture and Charles Batchelor Professor Emeritus of Electrical Engineering at Columbia University. He received his B.S. in mathematics and his M.S. in physics from UCLA, and his Ph.D. in physics from Massachusetts Institute of Technology (MIT), where he specialized in acoustics.

He co-authored with Vern Oliver Knudsen the book Acoustical Designing in Architecture, and edited several others, including Handbook of Noise Control, Shock and Vibration Handbook, Illustrated Dictionary of Historic Architecture, Dictionary of Architecture and Construction and American Architecture: An Illustrated Encyclopedia. These books are recognized as authoritative references in their field.

As a consultant, Harris participated in the design and construction of more than 100 halls, including the John F. Kennedy Center for the Performing Arts, Minnesota Orchestra Hall, Lincoln Center Metropolitan Opera House, Abravanel Hall, Benaroya Hall and Conrad Prebys Concert Hall in University of California, San Diego, and the Follinger Great Hall at the Krannert Center for the Performing Arts at Illinois, Urbana, IL .

Harris was a Fellow of the Acoustical Society of America. He served on the Executive Council (1954–1957), was vice president (1960–1961) and president (1964–1965) of the society, and was an associate editor of the Journal of the Acoustical Society of America (1959–1971). He was a member of the National Academy of Sciences, National Academy of Engineering, American Philosophical Society and several other professional societies and advisory boards. Harris served as president (1993) and chairman of the Board (1994) of the New York Academy of Sciences. His achievements in auditorium acoustics were recognized by the Wallace Clement Sabine Medal of the Acoustical Society of America, the Franklin Medal (1977), the AES Gold Medal (1984), the Mayor's Award for Excellence in Science and Technology (1985) and the ASA Gold Medal (1987). He held honorary doctorates from the New Jersey Institute of Technology and from Northwestern University.
