= Wallace Clement Sabine Medal =

The Wallace Clement Sabine Medal of the Acoustical Society of America is presented to an individual of any nationality who has advanced the science of architectural acoustics, either by being published in professional journals or periodicals, or by another accomplishment in architectural acoustics at the discretion of the awarding body. The award was named for pioneering acoustician Wallace Clement Sabine. Founded in 1957 by the Acoustical Society of America, the award is given when an outstanding candidate is recognized.

== Award recipients ==
- Vern Oliver Knudsen (1957)
- Floyd R. Watson (1959)
- Leo Beranek (1961)
- Erwin Meyer (1964)
- Hale J. Sabine (1968)
- Lothar Cremer (1974)
- Cyril M. Harris (1979)
- Thomas D. Northwood (1982)
- Richard V. Waterhouse (1990)
- Harold Marshall (1995)
- Russell Johnson (1997)
- Alfred C. C. Warnock (2002)
- William J. Cavanaugh (2006)
- John S. Bradley (2008)
- Christopher Jaffe (2011)
- Ning Xiang (2014)
- David H. Griesinger (2017)
- Michael Vorländer (2018)
- Gary W. Siebein (2020)

== See also ==
- List of physics awards
