= Jens Blauert =

German scientist (1938–2026)

Jens Peter Blauert (20 June 1938 – 14 March 2026) was a German scientist who specialised in psychoacoustics and an emeritus professor at the Ruhr-Universität Bochum, where he founded the Institute of Communication Acoustics. His major scientific fields of interest were spatial hearing, binaural technology, aural architecture, perceptual quality, speech technology, virtual environments and tele-presence.

== Life and career ==
Blauert was born in Hamburg on 20 June 1938, to Werner, a university lecturer and Hedwig. He received his elementary and secondary education in Dresden and Hamburg and later received a doctorate in engineering after studying communication engineering in Aachen in 1969. Since 1974, he was an important figure in electrical engineering and acoustics at the Ruhr-Universität Bochum, where he established the Institute of Communication Acoustics (IKA) and chaired it until 2003. After this, he was honored as an emeritus professor.

He was a fellow of the Acoustical Society of America, the Institute of Electrical and Electronics Engineers, the Institute of Acoustics, and the Audio Engineering Society. Further, he was honorary member of the German audiological society, and the Polish Acoustical Society. During his career, he authored or co-authored over 150 papers and has published books such as Spatial Hearing - the Psychophysics of Human Sound Localization (1983), a standard in this field.

Blauert provided his professional expertise to the science community in several countries and was asked to lecture at many universities worldwide, including Cardiff University. He served as chairman of the ITG committee on electroacoustics, cofounder and chairman of the European Acoustics Association, president and vice president of the German Acoustical Society, an associate board member of the International Commission for Acoustics, member of the Environmental-Protection Council of the State of North Rhine-Westphalia, board member and cofounder of the European Speech-Communication Association, and board member and cofounder of the section on noise and vibration, of the German Standard Association.

In 1994, he was awarded an honorary degree (Dr. Tech.) by Aalborg University, Denmark and has received various other honors and awards. In 1999, he was bestowed with the Helmholtz-Rayleigh Interdisciplinary Silver Medal of the Acoustical Society of America. In 2009, he co-authored the book Acoustics for Engineers: Troy Lectures with Ning Xiang.

Blauert died on 14 March 2026, at the age of 87.
