= Harold Marshall (acoustician) =

New Zealand expert in acoustics design and research (1931–2024)

Sir Harold Marshall KNZM FRSNZ FNZIA
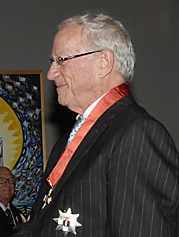
- Born: Arthur Harold Marshall; 15 September 1931
- Died: 31 August 2024 (aged 92); Auckland, New Zealand
- Education: University of Auckland; University of Southampton
- Known for: Room acoustics Lateral reflections
- Awards: Wallace Clement Sabine Medal (1995); Rayleigh Medal (2015)
- Scientific career
- Fields: Architecture; physics; acoustics
- Workplaces: University of Auckland; Marshall Day Acoustics

Sir Arthur Harold Marshall KNZM FRSNZ FNZIA (15 September 1931 – 31 August 2024) was a New Zealand expert in acoustics design and research. He was professor emeritus of the University of Auckland School of Architecture, and co-founder of Marshall Day Acoustics Ltd in 1981 with Chris Day.

Marshall is recognised internationally for his contribution to concert hall design, in particular his seminal work with Mike Barron on the importance of lateral reflections. He worked on several major concert hall projects including the Guangzhou Opera House with architect Zaha Hadid and the Philharmonie de Paris with French architect Jean Nouvel.

Marshall died in Auckland on 31 August 2024, at the age of 92. He was predeceased by his wife of 60 years, Shirley, Lady Marshall, in 2016.

== Honours and awards ==
Marshall was elected a Fellow of the Royal Society of New Zealand in 1994. He also held Fellowships in the Acoustical Society of America and the New Zealand Institute of Architects.

In 1995, he was awarded the Wallace Clement Sabine Medal by the Acoustical Society of America for his contributions to the field of architectural acoustics, and design of concert halls. In 2006, he received the Gold Medal of the Acoustical Foundation of India.

In the 2008 Queen's Birthday Honours, Marshall was appointed a Distinguished Companion of the New Zealand Order of Merit, for services to acoustical science. In 2009, following the restoration of titular honours by the New Zealand government, he accepted redesignation as a Knight Companion of the New Zealand Order of Merit.

In 2013, Marshall received the Pickering Medal from the Royal Society of New Zealand. In 2015, he was awarded the Rayleigh Medal by the Institute of Acoustics.
