= Rand Steiger =

American composer, conductor and pedagogue

Rand Steiger (born June 18, 1957, in New York City) is an American composer, conductor, and pedagogue.

Steiger attended the Manhattan School of Music and the California Institute of the Arts, where he became a faculty member in 1982. In 1987, he joined the faculty of the University of California, San Diego, where he served as chair of the music department from 2006 to 2009.

At UCSD, Steiger was instrumental in overseeing the planning, development, and building of the music school's acclaimed Conrad Prebys Music Center.

In 2009, he was visiting professor in the music department at Harvard University.

As a composer, Steiger first won notice in the 1980s for his work Quintessence. He was a fellow with the Los Angeles Philharmonic from 1987 to 1989, and has had compositions recorded by contemporary classical music ensembles recording for Centaur, CRI, Crystal, New Albion, and New World. His work often features elements of computer music and digital manipulation alongside traditional orchestral forces.

Steiger was the founding artistic director and a member of the California EAR Unit. He has also conducted contemporary ensembles such as the Arditti Quartet, Ensemble Sospeso, La Jolla Symphony, and the New York New Music Ensemble, and has conducted recordings on Einstein, Koch, Mode and Nonesuch.

In 2010 Steiger released a CD/DVD of works for instruments and electronics on the EMF label entitled Ecosphere. In 2014 the Talea Ensemble released another collection of his chamber music, A Menacing Plume, on New World Records.

The International Contemporary Ensemble premiered his Coalescence Cycle at a Composer Portrait concert at Miller Theater in New York in November 2013.
