= Morton H. Meyerson Symphony Center =

Concert hall located in Dallas, Texas

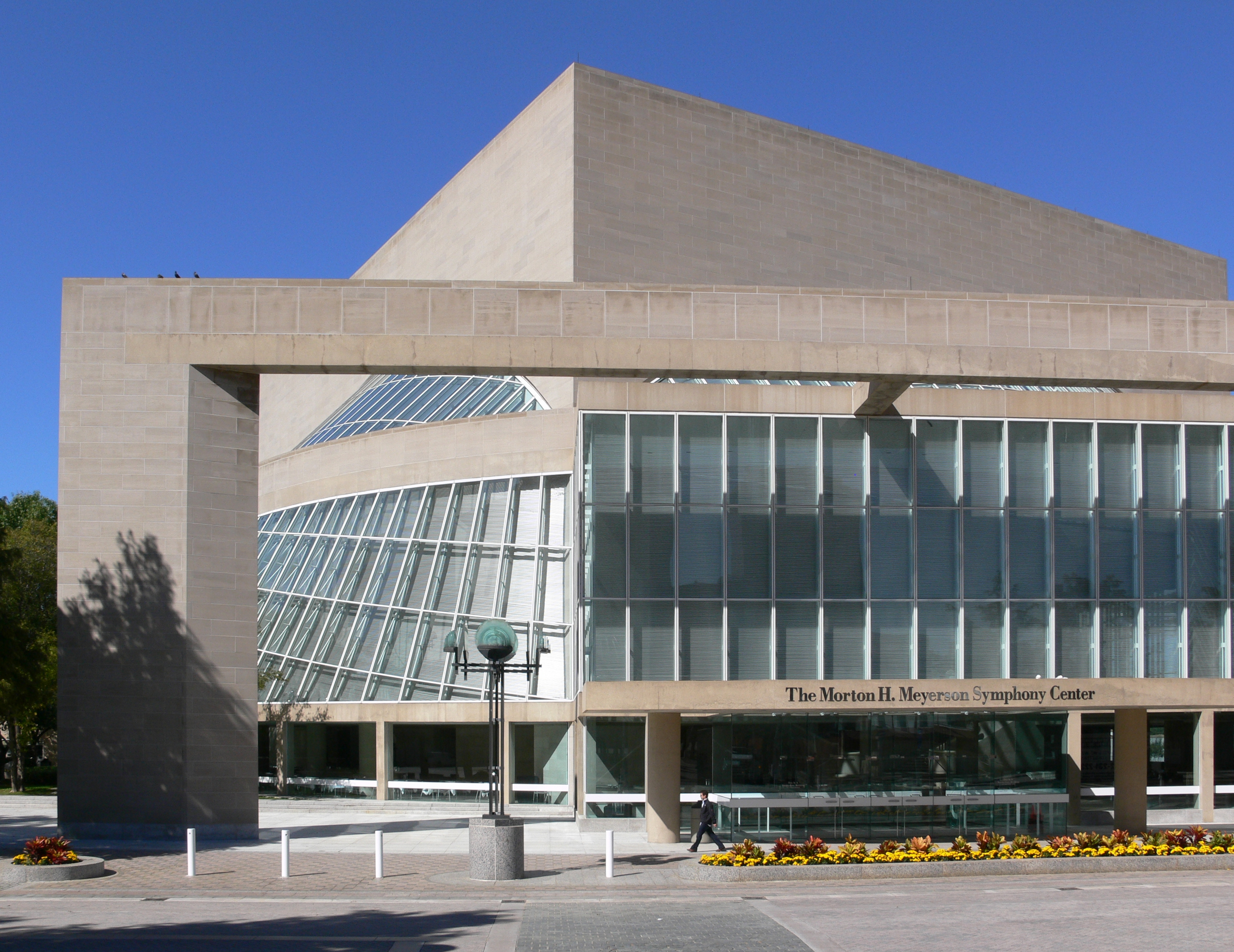
- Interactive map of Morton H. Meyerson Symphony Center
- Address: Arts District, Dallas; Dallas, Texas
- Coordinates: 32.789768°N 96.798637°W
- Owner: City of Dallas Office of Cultural Affairs
- Operator: Dallas Symphony Association
- Capacity: 2,062
- Type: Concert hall
- Public transit: M-Line: Olive & Flora

Construction
- Opened: September 1989
- Architect: I. M. Pei

Website
- dallasculture.org/cultural-venues/meyerson/

The Morton H. Meyerson Symphony Center is a concert hall located in the Arts District of downtown Dallas, Texas, US. Ranked one of the world's greatest orchestra halls, it was designed by architect I. M. Pei and acoustician Russell Johnson's Artec Consultants. The structural engineers for this project was Leslie E. Robertson Associates, and it opened in September 1989.

The center is named for Morton Meyerson, former president of Electronic Data Systems and former chairman and CEO of Perot Systems, who led the 10-year effort by the Dallas Symphony Association to create a home for the Dallas Symphony Orchestra. The new concert center was named in his honor in 1986 at the request of Ross Perot, who made a $10 million contribution to the building fund for the naming rights. It is the permanent home of the Dallas Symphony Orchestra and the Dallas Symphony Chorus, as well as the primary performing venue of the Dallas Wind Symphony and several other Dallas-based musical organizations. The Meyerson Symphony Center is owned by the City of Dallas and operated by the Dallas Symphony Association.

There are four private suites, for small concerts, meetings and events designed by Booziotis & Company Architects of Dallas.

== Design ==
The exterior of the large pavilion and lobby is circular and constructed of glass and metal supports to contrast with the solid geometric lines of the actual hall. Architect I. M. Pei, and structural engineer Leslie E. Robertson Associates has described the structure of the hall's interior as "very conservative". "It is conservative for reasons I no longer accept", he said in 2000. "I feel that the hall doesn't fully represent what I would have liked to do. It was my first one." Because the music performed in the hall was likely to be from the eighteenth and nineteenth centuries, Pei was unwilling to impose modern styles of architecture on the interior.

The trustees and acoustic team had decided on the shoebox style before Pei was hired, and he sought to sculpt the exteriors with more innovative designs. "I felt the need to be free", he said. "Therefore, to wrap another form around the shoebox, I started to use curvilinear forms... It does have some spatial excitement in that space for that reason."

=== Organ ===
The Meyerson Symphony Center also is home to the 4,535 pipe C. B. Fisk Op. 100 organ, known as the Lay Family Concert Organ. Although it had been Charles Fisk's dream to build a monumental concert organ (the firm unsuccessfully bid on the contract for San Francisco's Louise M. Davies Symphony Hall), and despite years of planning and design, he never lived to see it built, dying in 1983. The resulting instrument, built in 1991 and nearly unanimously hailed as a musical triumph, whilst it built on some of his ideas, was quite different from his original designs. The première performance was given in September 1992 by organists Michael Murray and David Higgs.

=== Acoustics ===
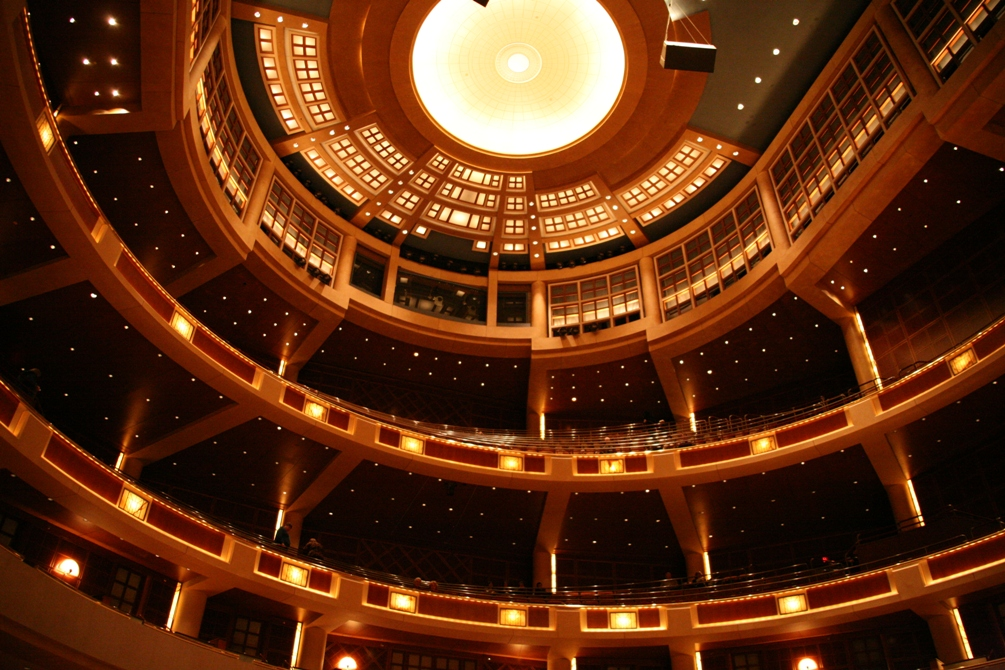
Eugene McDermott Concert Hall

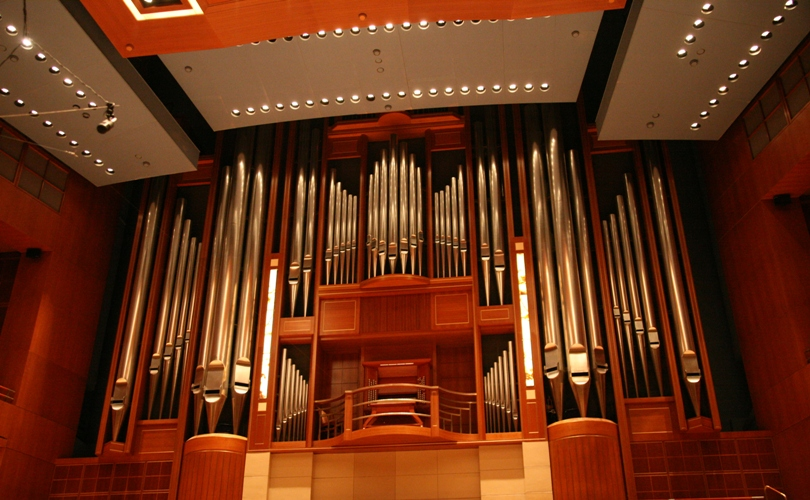
Herman W. and Amelia H. Lay Family Organ

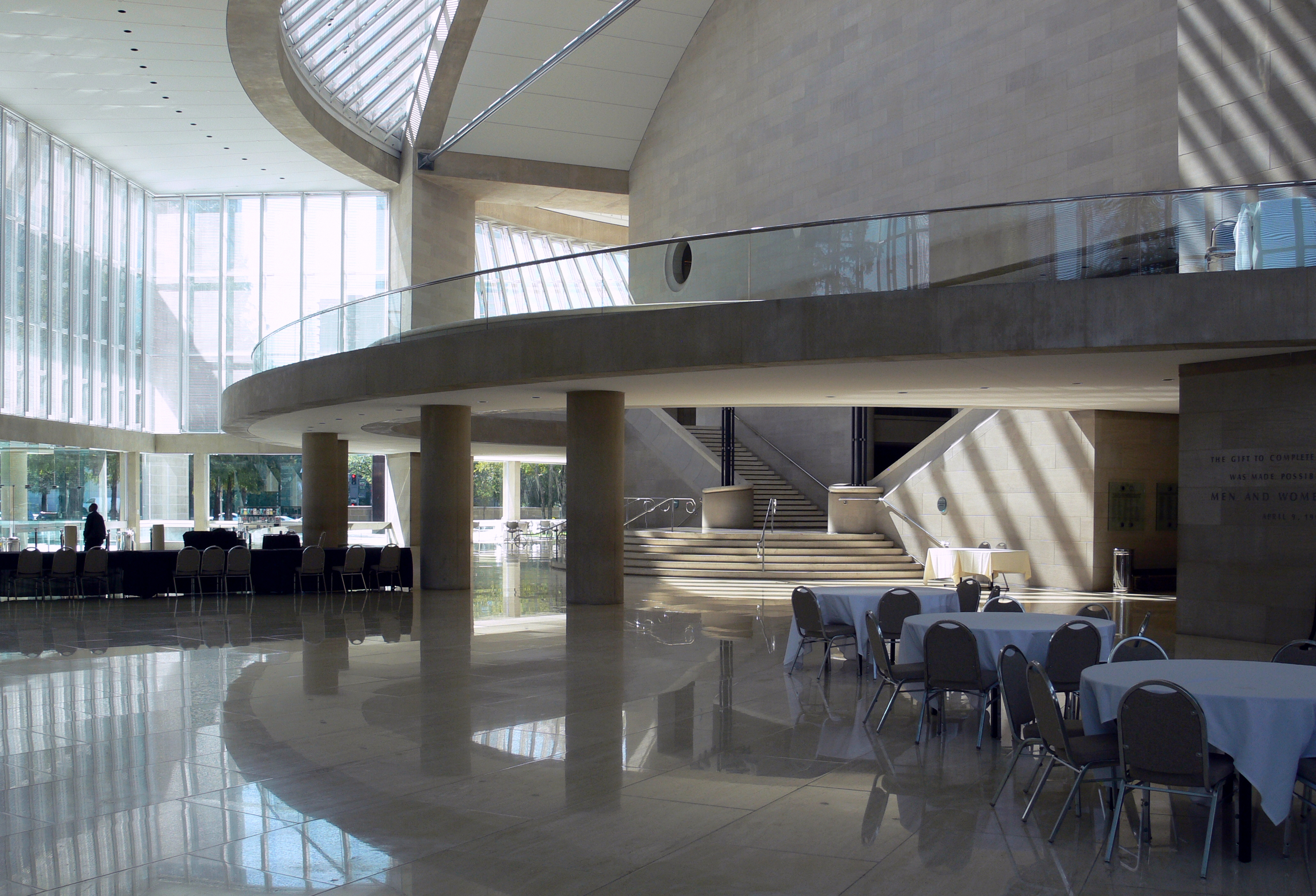
Foyer

The Eugene McDermott Concert Hall was designed by Artec Consultants (also responsible for the Pikes Peak Center's El Pomar Great Hall). Artec's Nicholas Edwards built upon ideas of Russell Johnson, the firm's founder, combining them with his own research and those of the German group in Göttingen. Systematically working through each area of the hall on each level, he generated sketches that indicated the best placement for walls in order to optimize the all-important lateral reflections. As his ideas crystallized, he began calling the evolving room shape the ‘reverse fan’. This was the eventual shape of both the Dallas concert hall and its younger sibling, Symphony Hall in Birmingham, England. Both these halls have strong ‘shoebox’ shaping, with the ‘reverse fan’ at the back of the room. 74 thick concrete chamber doors around the top of the hall weighing 2.5 tons each can be opened and closed to increase or reduce reverberance, 56 acoustical curtains help diminish sound vibrations and a system of canopies weighing more than 42 tons is suspended above the stage and can be raised, lowered, or tilted to reflect the sound throughout the audience chamber. The shoebox design was intended to achieve acoustical performance comparable to that of the Vienna Musikverein and the Amsterdam Concertgebouw. Russell Johnson, who died in August 2007, requested in his will that he be buried in the Meyerson, but logistical complications prevented the request from being granted.

=== Statistics ===
The Morton H. Meyerson Symphony Center has:

- 260,000 square feet (24,000 m^{2}) above ground space
- 225,000 square feet (20,900 m^{2}) below ground space
- 35,130 cubic yards (26,860 m^{3}) of concrete
- 30,000 square feet (2,800 m^{2}) of Italian travertine marble
- 22,000 pieces of Indiana limestone
- 4,535 organ pipes
- 2,062 seats
- 918 square panels of African (Makore) cherrywood
- 216 square panels of American cherrywood
- 211 glass panels (no two alike) comprising the conoid windows
- 85-foot (26 m) high ceiling in the concert hall
- 74 concrete reverberation chamber doors, each weighing as much as 2.5 tons
- 56 acoustical curtains
- 50 restrooms
- 4 private suites for meetings, banquets, and recitals

== See also ==
- List of tallest buildings in Dallas

== Notes ==
=== Sources ===
- von Boehm, Gero (2000). Conversations with I. M. Pei: Light Is the Key. Munich: Prestel. ISBN 3-7913-2176-5.
