= Enclos =

American design and engineering company

- Founded: 1946
- Headquarters: Eagan, Minnesota
- Website: https://enclos.com/

Enclos Corp, referred to as Enclos, is a specialty glazing and exterior facade contractor in the United States. The firm provides design, engineering, fabrication and assembly services for custom curtainwall systems and structural glass facades. Enclos is headquartered in Bloomington, Minnesota, and is a subsidiary of CH Holdings USA, Inc.

== History ==
Started in 1946 under the name Cupples Products, the firm initially manufactured residential window products. Over the years, the firm's scope of work progressed to include the design, engineering, fabrication, assembly and field installation of custom curtainwall systems. The firm operated over the decades under the names of Harmon Contract, Harmon Ltd, and Enclos.

In 2007, Enclos acquired Advanced Structures Inc. (ASI). The firm launched the Advanced Technology Studio of Enclos in Los Angeles, California in 2009. A second Advanced Technology Studio of Enclos was opened in New York City in 2011.

== Notable projects ==
- Allegiant Stadium, Las Vegas, Nevada,
- Chase Center, Golden State Warriors Stadium, San Francisco, California, 2019
- New Stanford Hospital, Palo Alto, California, 2019
- San Francisco Museum of Modern Art expansion, San Francisco, California, 2015
- World Trade Center Transportation Hub, Manhattan, New York City, 2015
- 300 New Jersey Avenue (also referred to as “51 Louisiana Avenue”), Washington, D.C., 2009
- 432 Park Avenue, Manhattan, New York City, 2015
- 680 Folsom Street, San Francisco, California, 2013
- Fulton Center, Manhattan, New York City, 2014
- John Jay College, School of Criminal Justice, Manhattan, New York City, 2011
- LA Live, Los Angeles, California, 2010
- Music City Center, Nashville, Tennessee, 2013
- Newseum, Washington, D.C., 2008
- One North Wacker, Chicago, Illinois, 2002
- Station Place: Security & Exchange Commission Headquarters, Washington, D.C., 2009.
- Bloomberg Tower, Manhattan, New York City, 2005
