= Conrad Prebys Music Center =

- CPMC

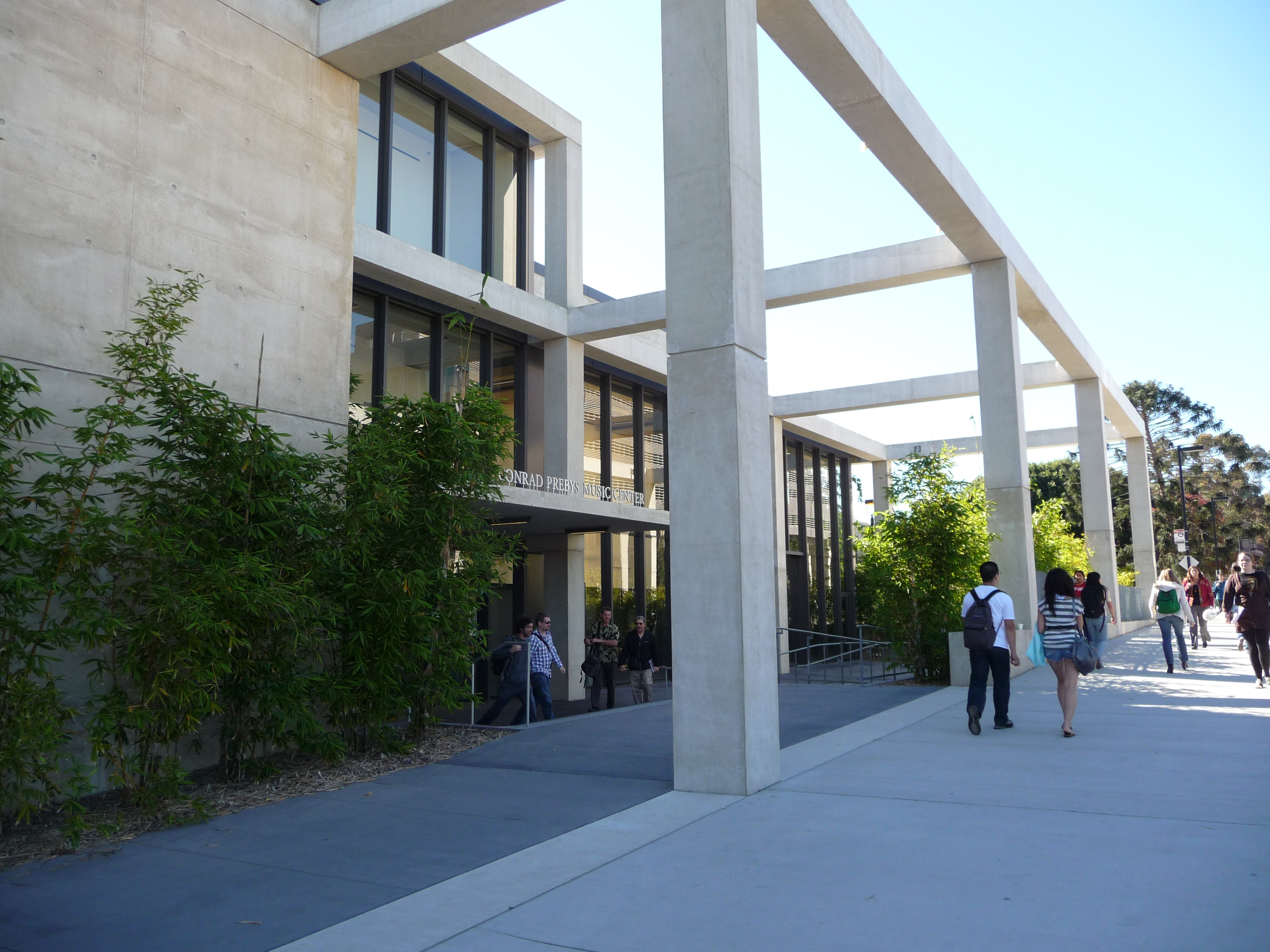
- The entrance to the music center
- Interactive map of Conrad Prebys Music Center
- Location: La Jolla, California
- Coordinates: 32.877820°N 117.234556°W
- Owner: University of California San Diego
- Capacity: 380 (Concert Hall); 144 (Recital Hall); 150 (Experimental Theater)
- Type: Concert hall
- Event: Music
- Public transit: MTS Gilman Transit Center

Construction
- Opened: 8 May 2009
- Cost: $53 million
- Architect: LMN Architects

Tenants
- UC San Diego Department of Music kallisti ensemble red fish blue fish

Website
- http://musicweb.ucsd.edu/

The Conrad Prebys Music Center (CPMC) is a music center on the campus of the University of California, San Diego. It houses the university's Department of Music, and is anchored by the 380-seat Concert Hall, in addition to the 144-seat Recital Hall and an Experimental Theater with a variable digital acoustics system and adjustable seating.

== History ==
From 1975 to 2009, the UC San Diego music department had been housed primarily in the Mandeville Center. But because the central Mandeville Auditorium had been designed as an all-purpose venue to accommodate a large variety of functions, the 750-seat hall was not designed for contemporary music performance.

Financing for a new Music Center was approved by the UC System in late 2006, and construction began in 2007. The $53-million Music Center was completed in May 2009 after receiving two donations totaling $9 million from local philanthropist Conrad Prebys. The building was constructed from the inside out, designed by architects Mark Reddington and Wendy Pautz of LMN Architects in Seattle and renowned acoustician Cyril M. Harris, in consultation with then chair of the music department, Rand Steiger.

== Conrad Prebys Concert Hall ==
The centerpiece of the Music Center is the 380 seat Concert Hall. The hall's interior is an asymmetrical system of triangular wood and plaster surfaces that fold around the room in order to diffuse sound throughout the space. The acoustics of the Concert Hall was the final project of acoustician Cyril M. Harris' career, who retired following the completion of the hall.

The first event to take place at the CPMC Concert Hall occurred on May 8, 2009, with a gala concert featuring works by UC San Diego faculty Rand Steiger, Philippe Manoury, Pulitzer Prize winners Roger Reynolds and Anthony Davis, and Guggenheim Fellowship recipient Lei Liang.

== Awards ==
The Music Center was awarded the 2009 American Institute of Architects Seattle Chapter Commendation Award, 2009 McGraw-Hill Construction Publishing's Best Higher Education/Research Facility in Southern California, and the 2010 San Diego Architecture Foundation Orchids & Onions' Grand Orchid designation.

== See also ==
- Conrad Prebys Performing Arts Center
