= Cathay, North Dakota =

Cathay
- City
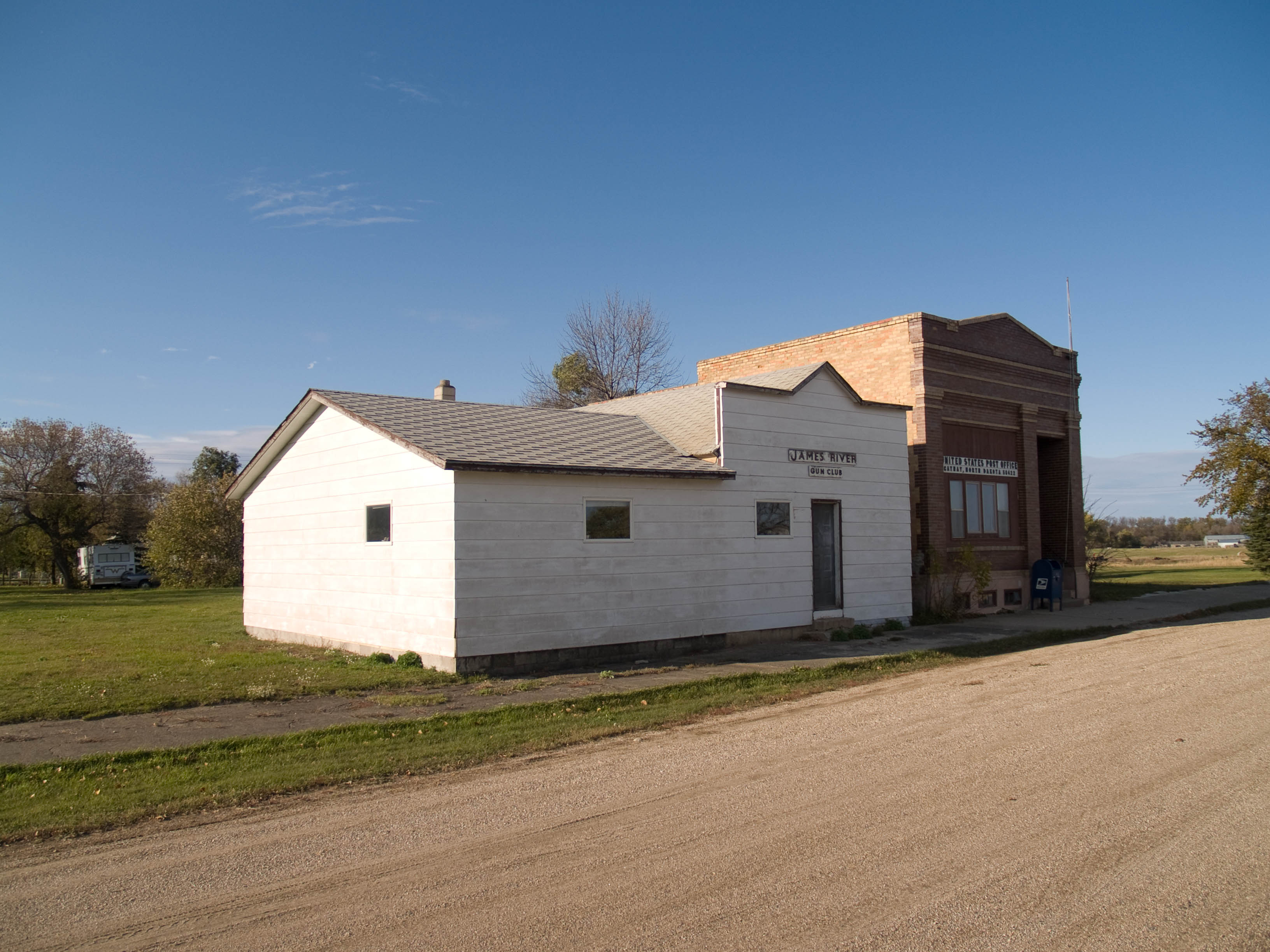
- The post office and gun club in Cathay

- Location of Cathay, North Dakota
- Coordinates: 47°33′15″N 99°24′38″W
- Country: United States
- State: North Dakota
- County: Wells
- Founded: 1893

Area
  - Total: 0.19 sq mi (0.49 km^{2})
  - Land: 0.19 sq mi (0.48 km^{2})
  - Water: 0.0039 sq mi (0.01 km^{2})
- Elevation: 1,581 ft (482 m)

Population (2020)
  - Total: 20
  - Estimate (2022): 21
  - Density: 108.9/sq mi (42.05/km^{2})
- Time zone: UTC–6 (Central (CST))
  - Summer (DST): UTC–5 (CDT)
- ZIP Code: 58422
- Area code: 701
- FIPS code: 38-12820
- GNIS feature ID: 1035958

Cathay is a city in Wells County, North Dakota, United States. The population was 20 at the 2020 census. Cathay was founded in 1893.

== History ==
Cathay got its start following construction of the railroad through the territory.

== Geography ==
According to the United States Census Bureau, the city has a total area of 0.18 square miles (0.47 km^{2}), all land.

== Demographics ==
Historical population
Census	Pop.	Note	%±
1910	225		—
1920	185		−17.8%
1930	235		27.0%
1940	189		−19.6%
1950	209		10.6%
1960	110		−47.4%
1970	110		0.0%
1980	66		−40.0%
1990	54		−18.2%
2000	56		3.7%
2010	43		−23.2%
2020	20		−53.5%
2022 (est.)	21		5.0%
U.S. Decennial Census; 2020 Census

=== 2010 census ===
As of the census of 2010, there were 43 people, 19 households, and 12 families residing in the city. The population density was 238.9 inhabitants per square mile (92.2/km^{2}). There were 29 housing units at an average density of 161.1 per square mile (62.2/km^{2}). The racial makeup of the city was 97.7% White and 2.3% Native American.

There were 19 households, of which 21.1% had children under the age of 18 living with them, 47.4% were married couples living together, 5.3% had a female householder with no husband present, 10.5% had a male householder with no wife present, and 36.8% were non-families. 31.6% of all households were made up of individuals, and 15.8% had someone living alone who was 65 years of age or older. The average household size was 2.26 and the average family size was 2.92.

The median age in the city was 47.5 years. 23.3% of residents were under the age of 18; 9.2% were between the ages of 18 and 24; 14% were from 25 to 44; 32.6% were from 45 to 64; and 20.9% were 65 years of age or older. The gender makeup of the city was 55.8% male and 44.2% female.

=== 2000 census ===
As of the census of 2000, there were 56 people, 21 households, and 14 families residing in the city. The population density was 305.9 inhabitants per square mile (118.1/km^{2}). There were 37 housing units at an average density of 202.1 per square mile (78.0/km^{2}). The racial makeup of the city was 98.21% White, and 1.79% from two or more races. Hispanic or Latino of any race were 1.79% of the population.

There were 21 households, out of which 28.6% had children under the age of 18 living with them, 61.9% were married couples living together, 4.8% had a female householder with no husband present, and 33.3% were non-families. 33.3% of all households were made up of individuals, and 14.3% had someone living alone who was 65 years of age or older. The average household size was 2.67 and the average family size was 3.43.

In the city, the population was spread out, with 28.6% under the age of 18, 3.6% from 18 to 24, 19.6% from 25 to 44, 30.4% from 45 to 64, and 17.9% who were 65 years of age or older. The median age was 44 years. For every 100 females, there were 75.0 males. For every 100 females age 18 and over, there were 73.9 males.

The median income for a household in the city was $35,625, and the median income for a family was $37,917. Males had a median income of $21,607 versus $23,750 for females. The per capita income for the city was $15,126. There were 5.3% of families and 11.4% of the population living below the poverty line, including no under eighteens and 16.7% of those over 64.
