= Pikes Peak Center for the Performing Arts =

Concert hall in Colorado Springs, Colorado, U.S.

Coordinates: 38.830966°N 104.82664°W

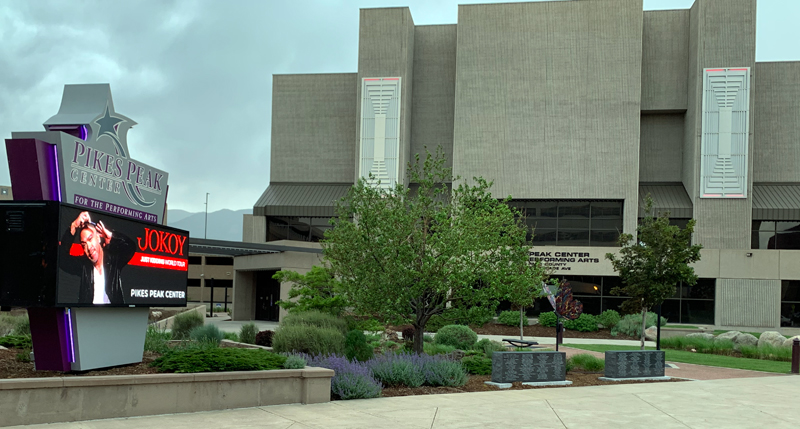
- Exterior view of venue (c.2020)
- Interactive map of Pikes Peak Center for the Performing Arts
- Address: 190 S Cascade Ave; Colorado Springs, Colorado, U.S. 80903-2211
- Owner: El Paso County
- Operator: CSWA
- Capacity: 1,989

Construction
- Opened: October 15, 1982

Website
- Venue Website

The Pikes Peak Center for the Performing Arts (known commonly as Pikes Peak Center) is a concert auditorium in Colorado Springs, Colorado, United States. It serves as an entertainment, cultural, educational, and assembly center for the citizens of El Paso County, the Pikes Peak region, and the surrounding area.

== History ==
Built by the citizens of El Paso County in 1982 to serve as a regional entertainment and cultural center, the Pikes Peak Center's downtown Colorado Springs location was a piece of the economic rejuvenation action plan for the innercity business quarter.

It opened October 15, 1982 with the Colorado Springs Symphony Orchestra, now known as the Colorado Springs Philharmonic Orchestra. The Pikes Peak Center has since achieved international approval for its design and acoustical attributes, and artists and critics have spoken highly in their compliments of the Center. More than 200 concerts are hosted by The Center each year. The proprietor of the Center is El Paso County, and it is operated alongside the Broadmoor World Arena.

== Seating ==
The concert hall features seating throughout the orchestra, loge, mezzanine and balcony sections. There are side box seats at the mezzanine and balcony levels, seat towers can be positioned on stage, and additional seats can be placed on the lift. At maximum, there are 1,171 seats on the main floor (Orchestra & Loge), 290 seats on the mezzanine level, and 528 seats on the balcony level.

== Acoustics ==
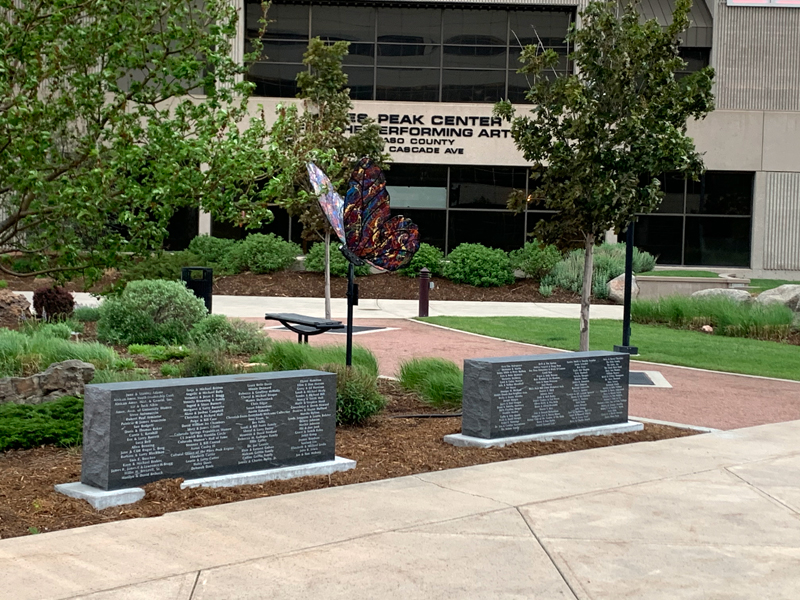
Cosmos Serenade artwork, added in 2009

The Pikes Peak Center's El Pomar Great Hall was designed by Russell Johnson's firm, Artec Consultants Inc, a theatre consulting and acoustics firm (also responsible for the Morton H. Meyerson Symphony Center's Eugene McDermott Concert Hall), and has several different acoustic control features. In addition to on-stage curtains, there are retractable banners along the side walls of the hall that can be lowered to absorb sound and curtains on the rear wall of each seating level. The banners are lowered for events utilizing the sound system, and retracted for symphonic and choral events. The loudspeaker bridge above the proscenium can be set at one level for events using the sound system and be retracted when its use is not required. The acoustic canopy above the Orchestra platform can be lifted from a position where it can be maintained from the floor to a position immediately below the room's ceiling. The canopy is positioned to reflect sound to the Orchestra and Loge seats when a smaller audience is anticipated, or raised for full sound dispersion when a large audience is anticipated. The on stage sound reflecting towers containing audience seating are positioned around the stage for symphony and choral performances. The seating towers and the stair towers for audience access/egress are moved on airbearings. The upper part of the stage house is separated from the performance space during symphony and choral performances by four ceiling panels over the stage that can be raised, lowered, or tilted vertically to change the acoustics of the hall.

== Equipment loading and transport ==
Next to stage left are the loading docks which can accept two tractor-trailers simultaneously. Loading is done through two detached 12-foot-wide 10-foot-high (3.7 m × 3.0 m) overhead doors. Cargo then turns 90 degrees to the right to go to the stage. An 8-foot-wide, 8-foot-high, 12-foot-deep (2.4 m × 2.4 m × 3.7 m) freight elevator is positioned in the delivery area. The elevator provides access to the basement levels for transportation of equipment into the orchestra pit area and the choir dressing rooms.

== Stage ==
The proscenium has a maximum opening of 81 by 40 feet (25 m × 12 m), but can be reduced to 34 by 16 feet (10 m × 5 m) with black velour masking. There is a 6-foot-deep (1.8 m) apron. And the working depth of the stage is 52 feet (16 m) from the plaster line. The stage is 116 feet (35 m) wide. The floor of the stage is maple over plywood, over two layers of sleepers, over neoprene blocks. The floor has wonderful resiliency for ballet and other dance mediums. Any kind of nailing or screwing into the floor is forbidden. The frontmost part of the stage consists of two screw jack lifts that can be raised to the level of the stage, arranged as a part of a two-tier stage setup, positioned at audience floor level, or lowered to create an orchestra pit. These orchestra pit/fore-stage lifts can also be lowered to the basement where audience seating can be positioned on the lifts. The audience seating is located on seating wagons, two of which travel on fixed rubber tire wheels from their storage level onto one of the lifts. The other four seating wagons travel on air bearings which float the wagons like a hovercraft onto downstage most orchestra pit/fore-stage lift. Orchestra player chairs and stands can also be transported to stage level via these lifts. The stage's maximum load is 160 pounds per square foot (780 kg/m^{2}).

== Dressing rooms ==
Directly behind the stage are six individual dressing rooms, each with its own make up station, toilet, sink and shower. The basement level contains two choir dressing rooms. Dressing room "A", with 2,000 square feet (190 m^{2}), is equipped with 24 makeup stations, and dressing room "B", with 1,800 square feet (170 m^{2}), is equipped with 31 makeup stations. Both rooms contain showers, sinks, and toilets. The greenroom is located between the choir dressing rooms and the northern staircase, and is 490 square feet (46 m^{2}).
