= Artec =

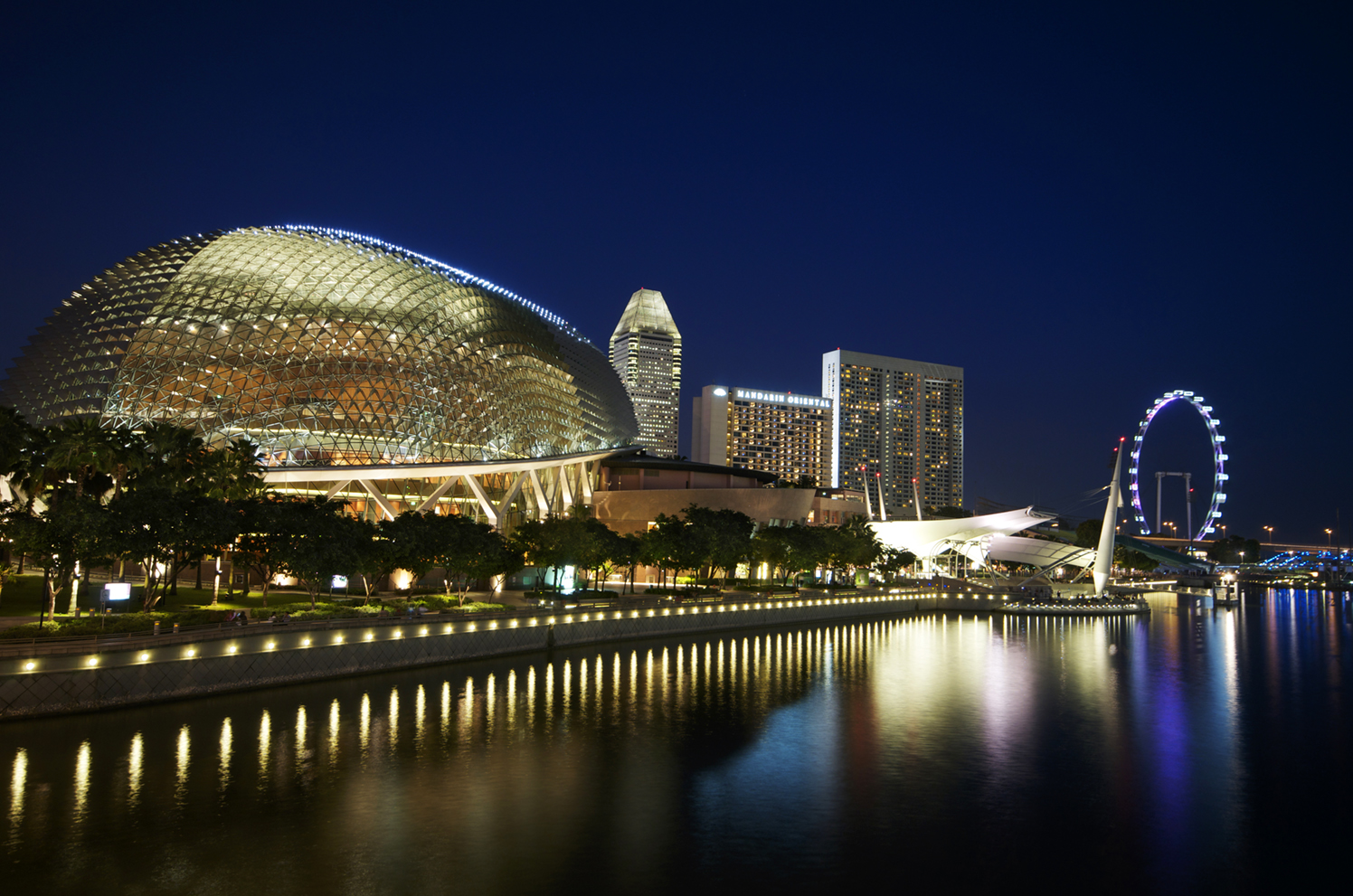
The Esplanade – Theatres on the Bay, Singapore

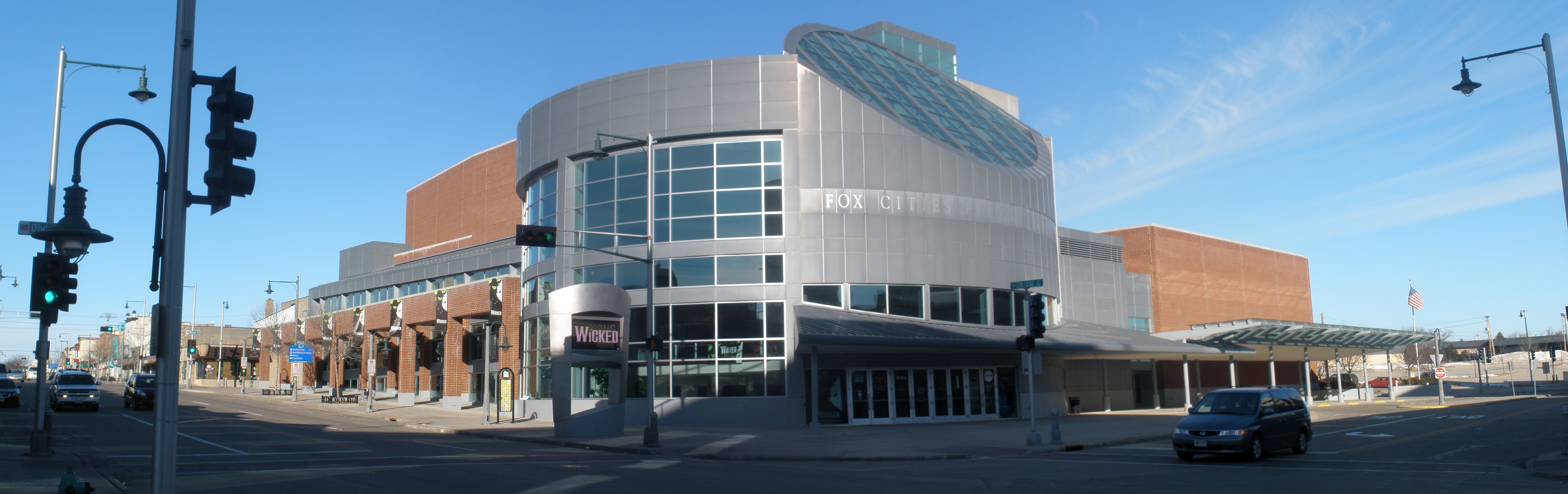
The Fox Cities Performing Arts Center, Appleton, Wisconsin, US

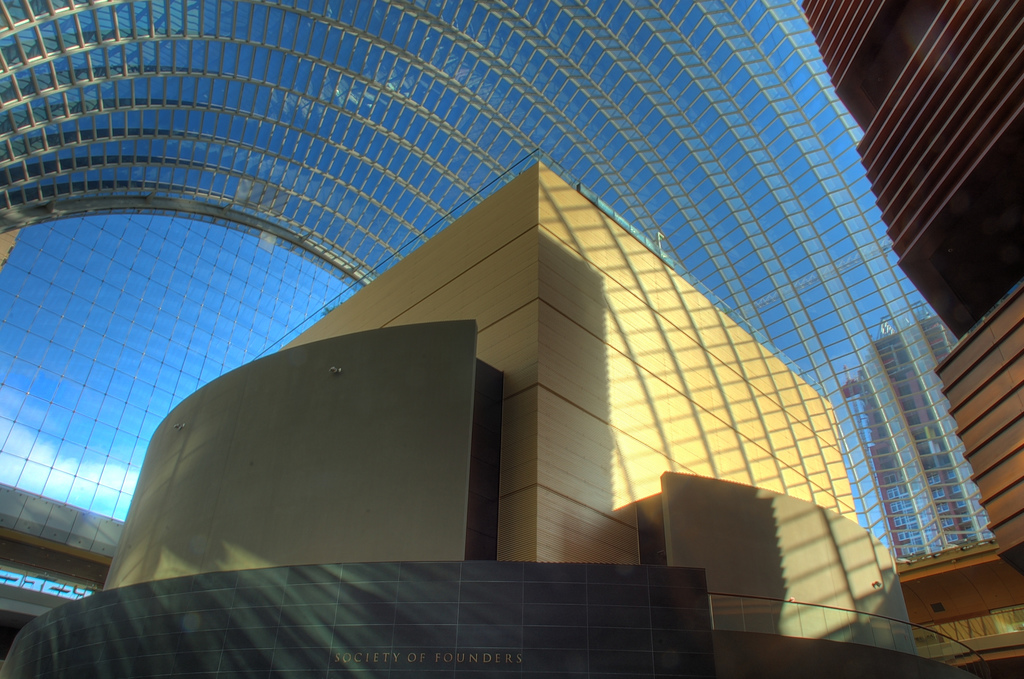
The Kimmel Center for the Performing Arts, Philadelphia, Pennsylvania, US

Artec Consultants Inc, is an acoustics design and theater planning firm located in New York City. The company was founded by Frederick Russell Johnson in 1970. In 2013, Artec was integrated into the acoustic design and theater consulting practice Arup Group.

Artec has done the acoustics design and theater planning for over 140 projects worldwide including the Esplanade – Theatres on the Bay, Salle Pleyel renovation in Paris, France, the Mariinsky II Opera House Basic Design for Valery Gergiev, Kravis Center for the Performing Arts, Jazz at Lincoln Center, New Jersey Performing Arts Center, Pikes Peak Center, the Montreal Symphony House, Centre in the Square, Chan Centre for the Performing Arts and acoustical upgrade of the Roy Thomson Hall.

The New York firm has been referred to as the field-leader in acoustic design, and Time called their design of the Esplanade complex in Singapore "one of the best anywhere".

== History ==
Artec was founded by Russell Johnson.

Over the years, Artec became one of the most sought after acoustical consulting firms because of their unique movable and automatic technology that helped revolutionize the field. Their design enable, through movable overhead canopies, retractable draperies and associated features, the adjustment of the acoustical environment to meet the needs of different kinds of music that could suit different performances or groups. The reflectors combined with a traditional shoebox shape design are considered trademarks of Artec.

The firm has collaborated on many projects with other architects including Cesar Pelli, Jean Nouvel, I.M. Pei, Moshe Safdie, Barton Myers, Bing Thom, Michael Wilford, Eberhard Zeidler, Fred Lebensold, Sir James Stirling, Robert Venturi, and Rafael Viñoly.

After Johnson's death in 2007, the company was managed by partners and associates until integration with Arup Group in 2013.
