= List of tourist attractions in Baton Rouge, Louisiana =

This is a list of points of interest in Baton Rouge, Louisiana.

== Architectural ==
- Huey P. Long Field House - one-time student union for LSU. When built, it featured the largest indoor swimming pool in the country at that time.
- Old Louisiana State Capitol
- Louisiana State Capitol - tallest state capitol building in the United States.
- LSU - One of only thirteen American universities designated as a land-grant, sea-grant and space-grant research center.
- Pentagon Barracks - Barracks completed in 1822 and listed on the National Historic Register. It now houses the Pentagon Barracks Museum and Visitors Center, offices of the lieutenant governor and private apartments for state legislators.
- Southern University - one of the most well known historically black colleges and universities.
- Yazoo and Mississippi Valley Railroad Company Depot - currently houses Louisiana Arts and Science Museum and was listed on National Register of Historic Places in 1994. It is considered Classical Revival in style.

== Assembly Centers ==
- Alex Box Stadium/Skip Bertman Field - Baseball stadium for LSU.
- Baton Rouge River Center and Baton Rouge River Center Arena - Entertainment complex.
- Memorial Stadium - 21,500-seat football stadium. Was built in 1956 in memory of the men and women who fought and served Baton Rouge during the two World Wars and the Korean War.
- F.G. Clark Center - basketball arena for Southern University.
- Pete Goldsby Field - 2,000-seat baseball stadium
- Pete Maravich Assembly Center - The "PMAC" is a 13,215-seat multi-purpose arena. The arena opened in 1972, and is home to the LSU Tigers and Lady Tigers basketball teams, volleyball team and gymnastics team. It was originally known as the "LSU Assembly Center," but was renamed in memory of Pete Maravich, a Tiger basketball legend, shortly after his death in 1988.
- Tiger Stadium - Football stadium for LSU.
- A.W. Mumford Stadium - Football and track stadium for Southern University.

== Parks ==
- Baton Rouge Zoo - BREC's Baton Rouge Zoo is home to over 1,800 animals from around the world. The Baton Rouge Zoo was the first zoo in Louisiana to achieve the distinguished honor of being accredited by the Association of Zoos and Aquariums.
- Blue Bayou Waterpark - Blue Bayou has over 20 water rides. Favorites are the "Mad Moccasin," "Conja" and "Racers."
- Capitol Lakes - located north of the State Capitol.
- City Park Golf Course - Baton Rouge's first public golf course.
- Dixie Landin' Amusement Park - Dixie Landin' contains 26 rides, 10 games and more. Contains such rides as the "Ragin' Cajun," "Flyin' Tigers," "Gilbeau's Galaxi" and "The Glimmer."
- Independence Park Botanic Gardens - Includes a rose garden, crape myrtle garden, sensory garden, children's forest, and Louisiana iris garden.
- Laurens Henry Cohn, Sr Memorial Plant Arboretum - contains more than 120 species of trees and shrubs on 16 acres (65,000 m^{2}).
- LSU University Lakes
- LSU AgCenter Botanic Gardens - Part of Burden Museum & Gardens, is located on 440 acres of green space in the heart of Baton Rouge and includes the lone Burden Conference Center, the Steele Burden Memorial Orangerie, Burden Pavilion, All-America Selections Trial and Display Garden, Barton Arboretum, Burden Woods, Children's Garden, Tropical Garden, Herb Garden, Rose Garden, Stone Camellia Collection and Historic Windrush Gardens. The Botanic Gardens conduct a wide array of horticultural research projects relating to turfgrass, vegetable crops, nursery production, ornamentals, fruit crops and wetlands.

== Museums ==
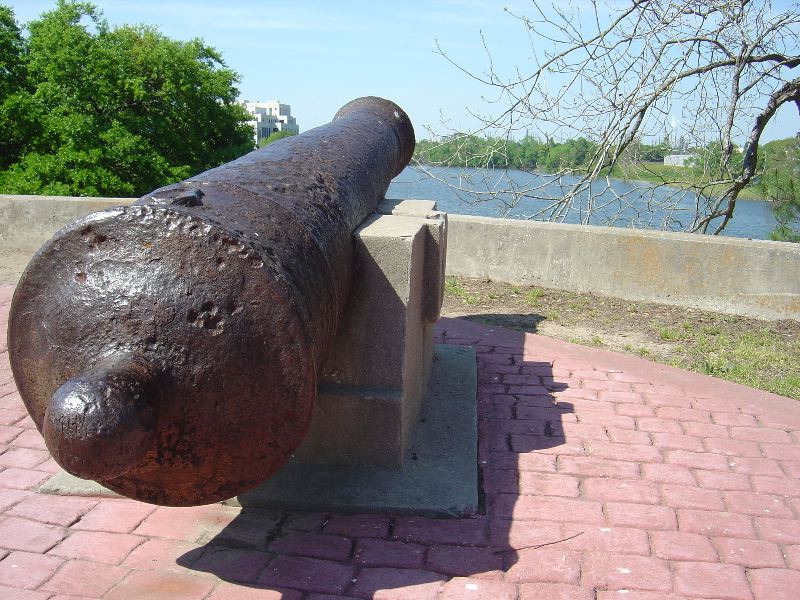
Arsenal Park overlooking Capitol Lake

- African-American Art Museum
- Highland Road Park Observatory - An astronomical observatory for education and recreation that provides regular events open to the public.
- Louisiana Arts and Science Museum - Contains art and science galleries, an Ancient Egypt Gallery and traveling exhibitions featuring content by world-renowned artists. LASM is also home to the Irene W. Pennington Planetarium and ExxonMobil Space Theater, which offers fulldome digital planetarium shows and large-format films.
- Louisiana State Museum - Baton Rouge
- LSU Museum of Art - located within the Shaw Center for the Arts. LSU MOA's permanent collection consists of about 4,000 objects with an emphasis placed on American, British, and, in particular, Louisiana art.
- Louisiana Museum of Natural History - Was founded in 1936 and is one of the nation's largest natural history museums, with holdings of over 2.5 million specimens. As the only comprehensive research museum in the south-central United States, the Museum fulfills a variety of scientific and educational roles. Contains two main exhibit areas, one in the Textile and Costume Museum, the other in the Museum of Natural Science.
- LSU Rural Life Museum - Commemorates the contributions made by Baton Rouge's various cultural groups through interpretive programs and events throughout the year.
- The Old Arsenal Powder Magazine - Is listed on the National Register of Historic Places. Was built around 1838.
- Old State Capitol - Louisiana's Old State Capitol Center for Political and Governmental History houses several interactive state-of-the-art exhibits including "Huey Long Live! The Kingfish Speaks", "We The People," "The Governor Huey P. Long Assassination Exhibit" and more.
- Magnolia Mound Plantation House - Built c. 1791. Is a rare survivor of the vernacular architecture influenced by early settlers from France and the West Indies.
- Mount Hope Plantation
- Pentagon Barracks - Barracks completed in 1822 and listed on the National Historic Register. Pentagon Barracks Museum and Visitors Center is located in the complex.
- Poplar Grove Plantation - Began life not as a home but as the Bankers' Pavilion at the World's Industrial and Cotton Centennial Exposition of 1884 in New Orleans. The exposition was held at what is today Audubon Park in uptown New Orleans. Was moved upriver on a barge in 1886 and became the home of sugar planter Horace Wilkinson and his wife, Julia.
- Shaw Center for the Arts - Performing-art venue and fine arts museum located at 100 Lafayette Street downtown.
- USS Kidd - a Fletcher-class destroyer, was the first ship of the United States Navy to be named for Rear Admiral Isaac C. Kidd, Commander of Battleship Division 1, who died on the bridge of his flagship USS Arizona during the attack on Pearl Harbor.

== Shopping ==
- Mall of Louisiana is a two-level 1,200,000 sq ft (110,000 m^{2}) upscale shopping mall with over 150 stores, including five department stores and a large food court. An expansion, known as "The Boulevard" is under construction currently, once complete will add 25 more stores and restaurants. A recently opened 15 screen theater "The Rave" is also part of the addition.
- Perkins Rowe is an urban village that contains over 600,000 sq ft (56,000 m^{2}) of retail. It houses many stores, restaurants, a Cinemark Movie Theater, and two future hotels.
- Siegen MarketPlace is a large power center that contains many national chain retailers and restaurants.
- Tanger Outlet is an outlet shopping center located in Gonzales, a southern suburb of Baton Rouge. It contains over 50 outlet stores and a recently completed expansion and renovation.
- Towne Center is a 400,000 sq ft (37,000 m^{2}) open-air shopping center located in the heart of Baton Rouge. It contains a mix of local and national retailers, restaurants, and an extended stay hotel.
