= Kermit Poling =

American conductor (born 1960)

Kermit Poling (born 1960 in Cleveland, Ohio, United States) is an American conductor, violinist, and composer.

Kermit Poling is Music Director of both the South Arkansas Symphony and the Shreveport Metropolitan Ballet. He has performed extensively throughout the United States and abroad, including concerts in Mexico, England, Ireland, France, Austria, Italy and Switzerland. His many guest conducting appearances have included the Orquesta Sinfónica del Estado de México, the Riverside (NJ) Symphonia, the Moscow Chamber Orchestra and Moscow Ballet, Filharmonia Veneta, Ballet South, Opera Lewanee!, the Adrian Symphony, the Mayormente Mozart Festival of Puerto Rico, and the Inter-American Festival of Contemporary Music. A virtuoso violinist, he performed 27 seasons as concertmaster of the Shreveport Symphony Orchestra, having also performed many solo works with the orchestra. He remains the Shreveport Symphony's Associate Conductor, having previously served as Interim Music Director.

Also a composer and arranger, Poling's has composed a dozen ballets including Snow White, Wizard of Oz, Aladdin, Phantom of the Opera and Beauty and the Beast. In 2003, he also arranged and conducted a new orchestral show with the Cox Family of Oh, Brother, Where Art Thou fame for a special Shreveport Symphony Orchestra fundraising event. He has similarly created orchestral arrangements for a wide range of artists, including Grammy winning guitarist Kenny Wayne Shepherd and blues singer Irma Thomas. His work, Candles and Dreidels has been performed by symphonies throughout the country. He was awarded a commission for a ballet based on The Wonderful Wizard of Oz, which premiered in the spring of 2006. Poling received the Outstanding Artist in Music Fellowship in 2000 from the State of Louisiana and the Music Fellowship from the Shreveport Regional Arts Council in 1996. He was awarded a conducting scholarship to the Tanglewood Music Center, studying with Leonard Bernstein, Kurt Masur, Gustav Meier and Seiji Ozawa, and received scholarships from the Boston Conservatory of Music and the Cleveland Institute of Music.

The Shreveport Summer Music Festival commissioned a series of works, including three string quartets - Within the Orb of Glories Wearing, Along These Footsteps to Paradise, Visions of the Virgin - and a large work commemorating the 150th anniversary of the start of the Civil War entitled "No Sound of Trumpet nor Roll or Drum." His recording of his first guitar concerto and the orchestral version of Along These Footsteps to Paradise with the London Symphony Orchestra was a Global Music Award winner. The recording is available from Centaur Records, as is the album Christmas Around the World with the West Edge String Quartet, on which he performs on violin in addition to having created all the arrangements heard on the album. His Symphony #1, "Shreveport", was premiered by the Shreveport Symphony Orchestra in 2016. In January, 2017 he made his debut recording with the London Symphony Orchestra, recording an album of his own compositions for the Centaur label

Having many close ties to theater, he has conducted nearly 100 different theatrical productions for the Majorie Lyons Playhouse of Centenary College, Shreveport Opera, the Greenbriar Theater of Ohio and other theaters throughout the U.S., with repertoire ranging from 1776 to Sweeney Todd. He has received numerous commissions to create new scores for theatrical works, including Elektra, As Bees in Honey Drown, and The Bat. In 1998 he was chosen by Emmy award winning artist William Joyce to compose the music for his stage adaptation of The Leafmen and the Brave Good Bugs. This project was sponsored by the National Endowment for the Arts, and the CD of this music was released the following year. He recently composed incidental music for The River City Repertory Theatre's production of Tennessee Williams's "The Glass Menagerie," starring Tony winner Donna McKechnie.

Maestro Poling has been a featured conductor on NPR's Performance Today, the Arkansas Educational Television Network, the Red River Radio Network, WGBH Boston and has appeared as violinist on Louisiana Public Television and PBS in addition to numerous television and radio stations throughout the country. Poling also has produced a number of recordings, including Reflections by the Shreveport Symphony in 1999, and Alive With the Spirit by the Faithlink singers in 2003, on which he also appears as conductor. In 2005, Maestro Poling made his debut in China conducting the Shenzhen Symphony and serving as one of three international judges for China's National Young Artists Competition. He has also been featured in Forum magazine as one of the top eight faces to watch.

Currently, Poling is the general manager of Red River Radio. He is organist and choir director at St. George's Episcopal Church in Bossier City, LA. He has one son, Aiden, from a previous marriage.
