= Tõnu Kalam =

Estonian-American conductor

Tõnu Kalam is an American orchestral pianist and conductor. He is best known as the music director of the UNC Symphony Orchestra at The University of North Carolina. He is also the former music director of the Longview Symphony Orchestra.

== Biography ==
=== Early years ===
Kalam was born to Estonian parents and has lived in the United States since age 2. He studied at Harvard University (A.B., 1969), the University of California at Berkeley (M.A., 1971) and the Curtis Institute of Music (Certificate, 1973). In his training as a classical conductor, composer and pianist, he studied with conductor Max Rudolf and composers Leon Kirchner and Andrew Imbrie. Kalam won a prize in the inaugural Baltimore Symphony Orchestra Young Conductor's Competition, and also placed as a finalist in the Exxon/Arts Endowment Conductors Program. Also included in his credits are summer fellowships at Tanglewood and Aspen, and numerous years at the Marlboro Music School in Vermont, where he was the guest conductor for the Beethoven Choral Fantasy on five occasions at the invitation of Rudolf Serkin.

=== Professional career ===
Kalam was Music Director of the Illinois Opera Theatre at the University of Illinois for seven years. Since 1984, he has been associated with the Kneisel Hall summer chamber music festival in Blue Hill, Maine, where he served for thirteen years in a variety of administrative and musical capacities including Executive Director, Summer Program Director, Artist-Faculty pianist and chamber music coach. He also serves as Past President of the Board of Directors of the Conductors Guild.

Tõnu Kalam's guest-conducting credits are numerous and include the North Carolina Symphony, the Madison Symphony Orchestra, the Huntsville Symphony Orchestra, the Shreveport Symphony Orchestra, the ProMusica Chamber Orchestra of Columbus, the Baton Rouge Symphony Orchestra and the East Texas Symphony Orchestra. He has also conducted over 135 opera performances for a variety of companies including the Shreveport Opera, the Lake George Opera Festival and the Nevada Opera Company. Kalam's European debut was in 1994 where he conducted the Estonian National Symphony Orchestra in Tallinn and was immediately reengaged to make festival appearances the following year. He has since returned to Europe in 1997 to guest conduct Finland's Oulu Symphony Orchestra and again in 2004 for the fourth time in Estonia at the Tubin and His Time festival.

Kalam currently teaches instrumental conducting at the University of North Carolina, Chapel Hill, where he has been a member of the faculty since 1988. He is the music director and conductor of the Longview Symphony Orchestra as well as the founder, music director and conductor of the Chapel Hill Chamber Orchestra along with the music director and conductor of the UNC Symphony Orchestra.
