= RiverView Theater (Shreveport, Louisiana) =

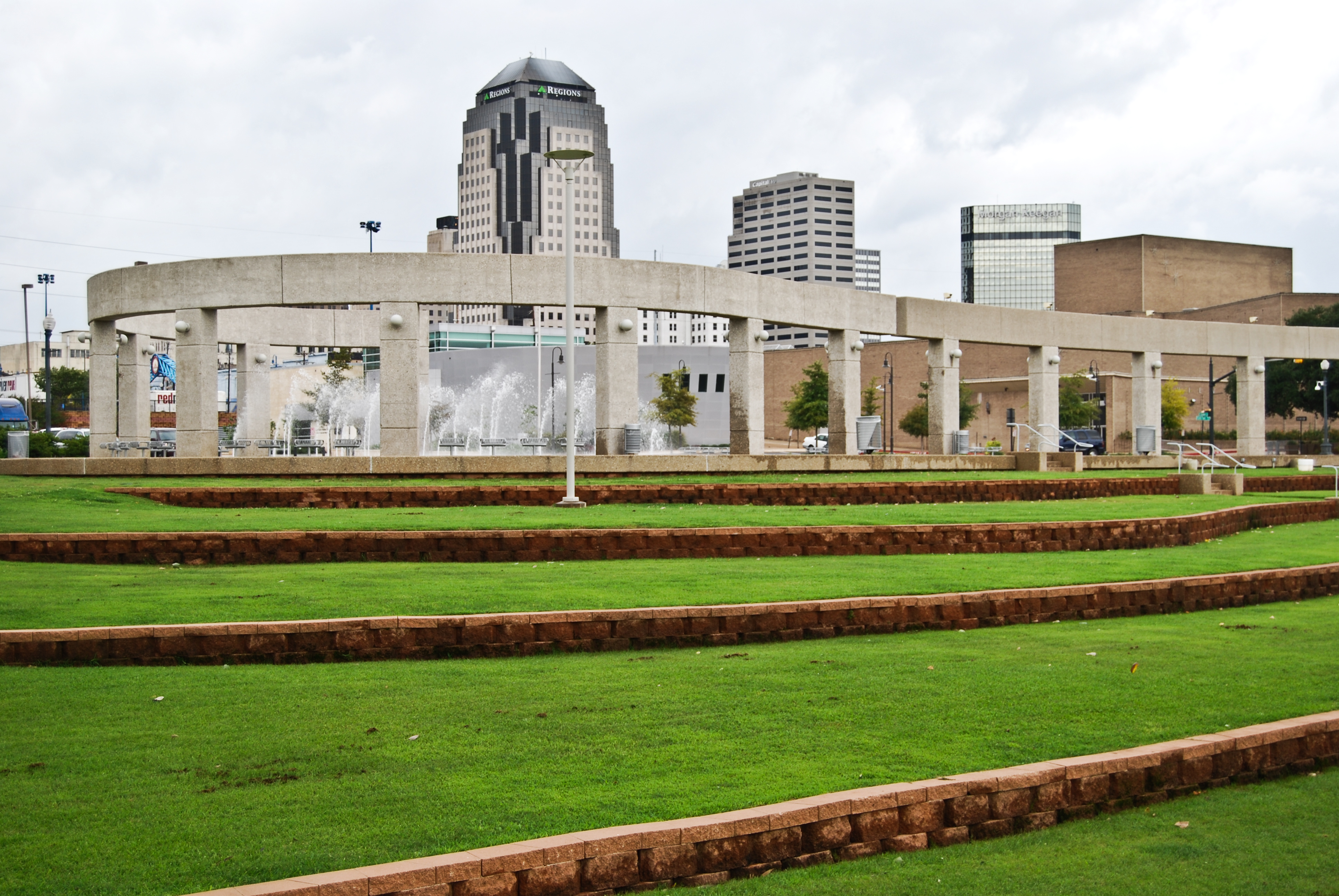
- RiverView Theater in RiverView Park
- Interactive map of RiverView Theater
- Address: 600 Clyde Fant Pkwy; Shreveport, Louisiana; USA
- Coordinates: 32.51519°N 93.7437°W
- Capacity: 1,725
- Type: Performing arts
- Current use: Performing arts venue

Construction
- Opened: 1965

Website
- Official website

The RiverView Theater is a theater located in RiverView Park in Shreveport, Louisiana. It serves as the home of the Shreveport Symphony Orchestra, Shreveport Opera and Shreveport Metropolitan Ballet.

== History ==
The 1,725-seat theater first opened in 1965 as the Shreveport Civic Theater.

== See also ==
- List of concert halls
- List of music venues
- List of opera houses
- Theater in Louisiana
