= Swine Palace =

American non-profit theatre company

Coordinates: 30°24′29″N 91°10′38″W

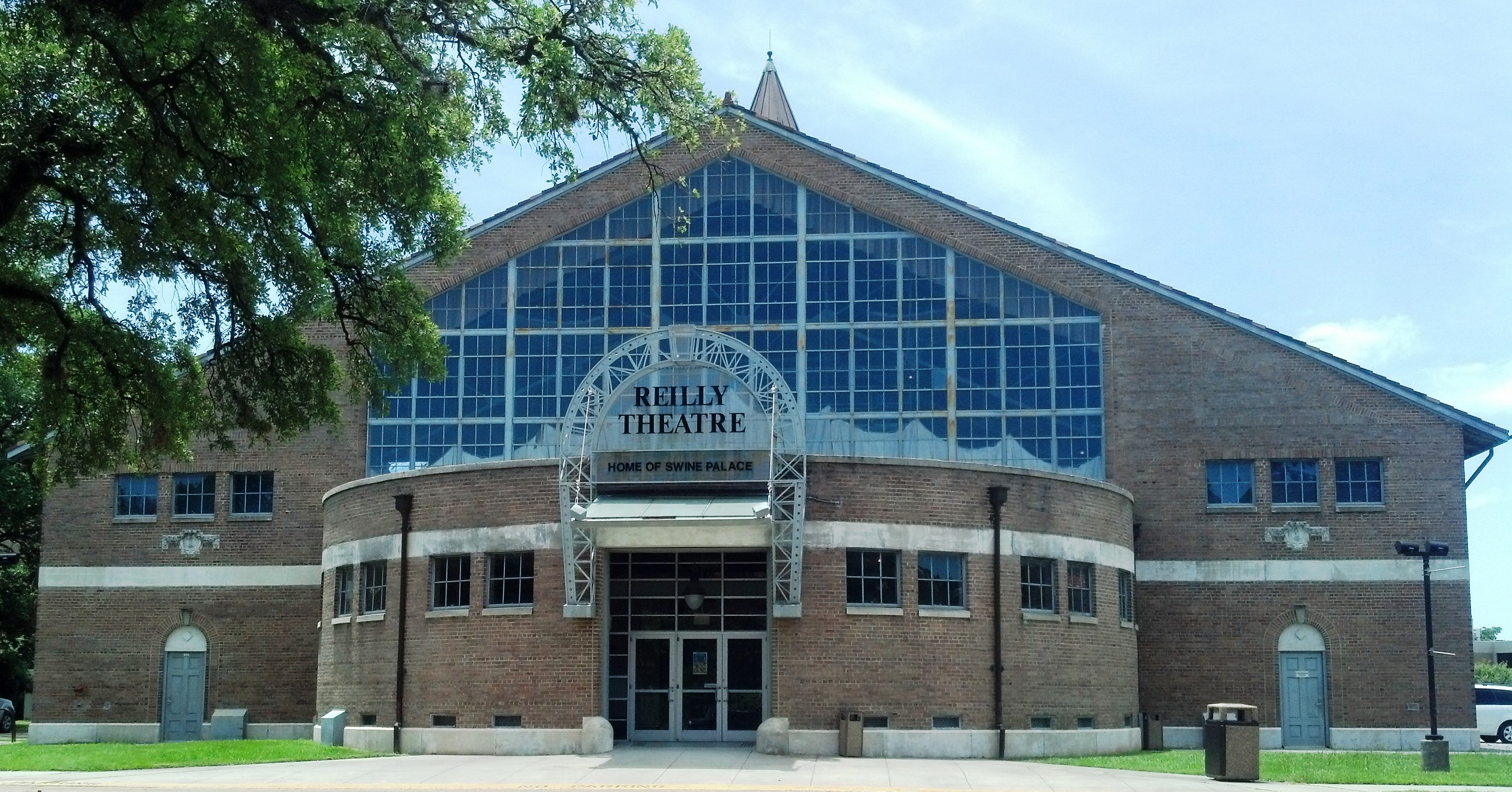
The Reilly Theatre, home of Swine Palace

Swine Palace is a non-profit professional theatre company associated with the Louisiana State University Department of Theatre in Baton Rouge, Louisiana. The theatre companies home is located on the campus of LSU.

== History ==
In 1992, a historic livestock judging pavilion called the Swine Palace was slated for and spared demolition by a grant from the Reilly family and the efforts of Gresdna Doty of the LSU Theatre Department. The theater company founded in 1992 by Barry Kyle (former Artistic Director of the Royal Shakespeare Company’s Swan Theatre) in association with LSU Department of Theatre was named after the original name of the building in which it would be located. The Swine Palace building was renamed the Reilly Theatre and was designed to maintain the architectural integrity of its original origins. During the spring of 2007, in conjunction with the LSU Performing Arts Series and Ping Chong and Company, the Swine Palace produced the world premiere of Cocktail, written by Vince LiCata and Ping Chong. Based on the true struggles of Thai scientist Krisana Kraisintu, this play follows the struggle to create an affordable version of the anti-HIV drug AZT for the thousands of Thai AIDS patients.

In June 2007, LSU Theatre and Swine Palace embarked on the first-ever international tour performing Wendy Wasserstein's "The Heidi Chronicles" directed by Michael Tick at the Shanghai Dramatic Arts Centre and the Beijing Central Academy of Drama. As such, they were the first theatre company to perform Ms. Wasserstein's work in China, and one of only a handful of U.S. companies to perform at either of these prestigious institutions.

The China tour was conceived as part of LSU's University-wide China initiative and included five performances at the Shanghai Dramatic Arts Centre, the largest performing arts institution in Shanghai, and three performances at the Beijing Central Academy of Drama, one of the finest academies in Asia. The play was originally performed as part of Swine Palace's 2006–2007 season. In total, 31 people made the month-long trip, including 15 undergraduates and graduate students; six faculty members and a number of friends and family.

== Production history ==
Season	Play	Director
2026-2027	Intimate Apparel	Eric J. Little
	A Midsummer Night's Dream	G.D. Kimbele
2025-2026	The Totality of All Things	Keith Arthur Bolden
	Miss Bennet: Christmas at Pemberley	Sharon Graci
2024-2025	Red Velvet	G.D. Kimble
	People, Places, and Things	Joy Vandevort-Cobb
2023-2024	Roe	Lori Elizabeth Parquet
	The Book of Will	George Judy
2022-2023	Craters	Chuck Mike
	Operating Systems	Candy McLellan
2021-2022	Sweat	G.D. Kimble
2020-2021	Small Mouth Sounds	Leigh Fondakowski
2019-2020	Oil	Joy Vandevort-Cobb
	Gloria	Femi Euba
2018-2019	Airline Highway	Joy Vandevort-Cobb
	The Curious Incident of the Dog in the Night-Time	Rick Holden
2017-2018	Always...Patsy Cline	Vastine Stabler
	Arcadia	George Judy
	The Mountaintop	Femi Euba
2016-2017	Stupid F***ing Bird	Risa Brainin
	The Seagull	Gavin Cameron Webb
	Julius Caesar	Jane Page
	Noises Off	Vastine Stabler
2015-2016	Vieux Carré	George Judy
	Disgraced	Femi Euba
	As You Like It	George Judy
2014-2015	Frankenstein	George Judy
	All My Sons	Jane Page
	The Book Club	George Judy
2013–2014	Spill	Leigh Fondakowski
	Dove	Sean Daniels
	Clybourne Park	Femi Euba
2012–2013	All The King's Men	George Judy
	Rising Water	George Judy & Ben Koucherik
	A Free Man of Color	Paul Russell
2011–2012	The Brothers Size	Femi Euba
	Pride and Prejudice	George Judy
	August: Osage County	George Judy
2010–2011	The Metal Children	Joanna Battles
	King Lear	Deb Alley
	Design for Living	George Judy
2009–2010	Self Defense (or death of some salesmen)	Joanna Battles
	A Doll's House	George Judy
	The Royal Family	John Dennis
2008–2009	Love's Labour's Lost	George Judy
	Satellites	Michael Tick
	Disney's High School Musical on Stage!	Paula Sloan
2007–2008	Hair	Steve Young
	Speak Truth to Power	Michael Tick
	King Hedley II	Joy Vandervort-Cobb
2006–2007	Cocktail	Ping Chong
	The Heidi Chronicles	Michael Tick
	Metamorphoses	Steve Young
2005–2006	Always...Patsy Cline	Jennifer Jones-Cavenaugh
	She Stoops to Conquer	Jane Page
	Tennessee Williams in QUARTER Time	John Dennis
	Arms and the Man	Jane Brody
2004–2005	Pump Boys and Dinettes	Jennifer Jones-Cavenaugh
	You Can't Take It with You	John Dennis
	The Exonerated	Michael Tick
	Macbeth	Leon Ingulsrud
2003–2004	Always...Patsy Cline	Jennifer Jones-Cavenaugh
	The Laramie Project	Leon Ingulsrud
	Shiloh Rules	John Dennis
	"Ma" Rainey's Black Bottom	Joy Vandevort-Cobb
2002–2003	The Louisiana Purchase	Dom Ruggiero
	The Two Gentlemen of Verona	John Dennis
	Fences	Joy Vandevort-Cobb
2001–2002	Death of a Salesman	Leon Ingulsrud
	A Christmas Carol	John Dennis
	The Tavern	Edward Morgan
2000–2001	To Kill A Mockingbird	Vastine Stabler
	Jesus Christ Superstar	Barry Kyle
	Romeo and Juliet	Tina Packer
1999–2000	Waiting for Godot	Barry Kyle & Vastine Stabler
	Three Sisters	Barry Kyle
	A Midsummer Night's Dream	Barry Kyle
	Gumbo Ya-Ya	Barry Kyle
	Four Joans and a Fire-eater	Barry Kyle
1998–1999	Angels in America, Part II: Perestroika	Barry Kyle
	Gloria Duplex	Barry Kyle
	As I lay Dying	Edward Kemp
1997–1998	Pump Boys and Dinettes	Barry Kyle
	Angels in America, Part I: The Millennium Approaches	Barry Kyle
	Skylight	Barry Kyle
	The Merchant of Venice	Barry Kyle
1996–1997	A Confederacy of Dunces	Barry Kyle
	Flesh & Blood	Barry Kyle
	The Rocky Horror Show	Barry Kyle
	Suburbia	Barry Kyle
	Geniuses	Steven Soderbergh
1995–1996	The Kingfish	Andrew Dickey
	A Midsummer Night's Dream	Barry Kyle
	The Cure at Troy	Barry Kyle
	The Rocky Horror Show	Lucy Maycock
	From the Mississippi Delta	Trellis Steptor
1994–1995	Cat on a Hot Tin Roof	Barry Kyle
	Keely & Du	Barry Kyle & Lucy Maycock
	Tent Meeting	Barry Kyle & C.C. Courtney
	A Midsummer Night's Dream	Barry Kyle
	A Child's Christmas in Wales	Barry Kyle
1993–1994	A Confederacy of Dunces	Barry Kyle
	Good	Barry Kyle
1992–1993	All the King's Men	Barry Kyle
	The Hypocrite	Barry Kyle

== See also ==
- Louisiana State University
- Theater in Louisiana
