= State Palace Theatre (New Orleans) =

Performing arts venue in Louisiana, US

Coordinates: 29°57′19.69″N 90°4′24.24″W

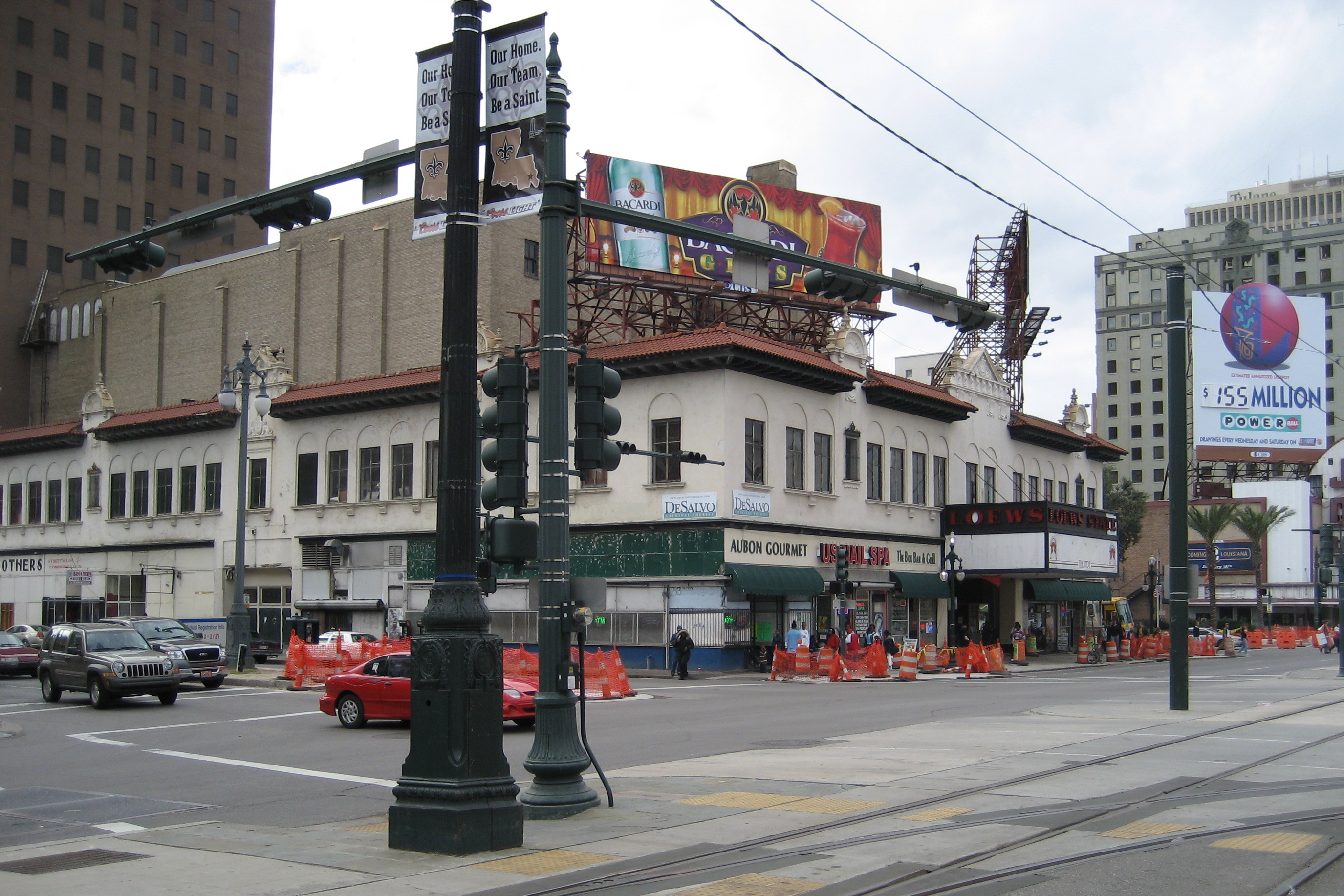
Exterior view, 2007

The State Palace Theatre is a shuttered historic theater in downtown New Orleans, Louisiana. It is located at the uptown lake corner of Canal Street and Rampart Street. The Saenger Theater is directly opposite the State Palace on Canal Street.

== History ==
The theatre was constructed in 1926 for the Loew's Theatre circuit. It had a seating capacity of 3,335 and also contained a 3/13 Robert Morton organ. Lew Cody, Buster Keaton, Jack Mulhall, Dorothy Mackaill, Conrad Nagel, Dorothy Phillips, Lloyd Hamilton, and Dorothy Mason were among the stars who appeared on stage with Marcus Loew when the theatre opened on Easter Sunday, April 3, 1926 as the State Theatre. The theatre showed silent films and hosted live performances. As time went on, silent films were replaced with talking pictures and eventually the prized 3/13 Robert Morton organ was destroyed in a flood. In 1976, the State Theatre was divided into three screens, before closing as a movie house in the late-1980s.

Eventually, the partitions were removed, and the State Theatre was restored and renamed the State Palace Theatre, showing classic movies and offering concerts. The State Palace Theater was a center of the Southern rave scene in the mid-1990s, hosting top DJs. The documentary "Rise: Story of Rave Outlaw Disco Donnie" highlights the rave scene at the State Palace Theater.

The theater flooded in 2005's Hurricane Katrina levee failure disaster. Some clean-up was done, allowing it to open for a few raves through 2007; but the building was in need of serious renovation and was closed by the fire marshal after it was sold to new owners.

City Officials and Broadway South planned to reopen the theater for the 2010–11 season. Renovations were set to take place in the summer of 2009, but never started.

In August 2014, it was announced the State Palace Theater had been purchased by New Orleans developer Gregor Fox. Fox confirmed the purchase to WWL-TV. Fox indicated he planned to renovate both the interior and exterior of the historic building and put the property back into commercial use. Fox said he wanted the space to contribute to the city's arts community and was excited about the redevelopment. However, Fox sold the theater in 2015, after learning restoration would cost as much as $40 million.

A new developer, LC Hospitality Group, submitted a proposal to the Central Business District Architectural Review Committee on April 24, 2018, which proposed gutting most of the theater's interior and constructing a 9-story, 132-room hotel. The plans, drawn up by the architectural firm of Trapolin-Peer, included a parking garage.

== See also ==
- List of music venues
- Theatre in Louisiana
