= Hearn Stage at The Kress Theatre =

Coordinates: 31.310°N 92.445°W

Hearn Stage at The Kress Theatre is a small, blackbox performance space located at the corner of Fourth and Johnston streets in downtown Alexandria, Louisiana in the historic Rapides Foundation Building. The Kress Theatre gets its name from the building's former occupant, the Kress Five and Dime Store. Two local theatre collectives, City Park Players and Spectral Sisters Productions, are currently based out of The Kress Theatre.

== See also ==
- Theatre in Louisiana
