= Joy Theater =

- The Joy Theater, in downtown New Orleans, opening day, Feb. 7, 1947.
- Interactive map of Joy Theater
- Location: 1200 Canal Street; New Orleans, Louisiana, USA
- Coordinates: 29°57′23″N 90°04′26″W
- Seating type: Orchestra, balcony
- Capacity: 1,200
- Type: Indoor theater

Construction
- Opened: 1947
- Renovated: 2011

The Joy Theater, named after owner Joy Houck, is a theater and historic landmark built in 1947 on Canal Street in downtown New Orleans, Louisiana. Renovations in 2011 transformed the former movie palace into a multi-purpose theater for live music, stand-up comedy, private functions, and corporate events. The theater's iconic marquee sign was restored, as was the building's original art deco architecture.

== History ==
On February 7, 1947, the Joy Theater opened at a cost of $275,000 (ca. $4,100,000 in 2026), with seats for 1,250 patrons. Hailed as "New Orleans' newest and most modern film temple," the theater was equipped with a crying room, a glass-enclosed area behind the back row that enabled parents with young children to enjoy the show without disturbing the other patrons. The Joy was built by long-time theater operators Joy Houck (the theater's namesake) and Levere Montgomery, Sr. The architect was B. W. Stevens. Lover Come Back, starring Lucille Ball, was the opening feature.

In 2003, "finally succumbing to the competition from megaplexes with stadium-style seating and a dozen or more screens," the Joy Theater closed.

In August 2005, the flood following Hurricane Katrina inundated the structure.

The Joy reopened in December 2011.

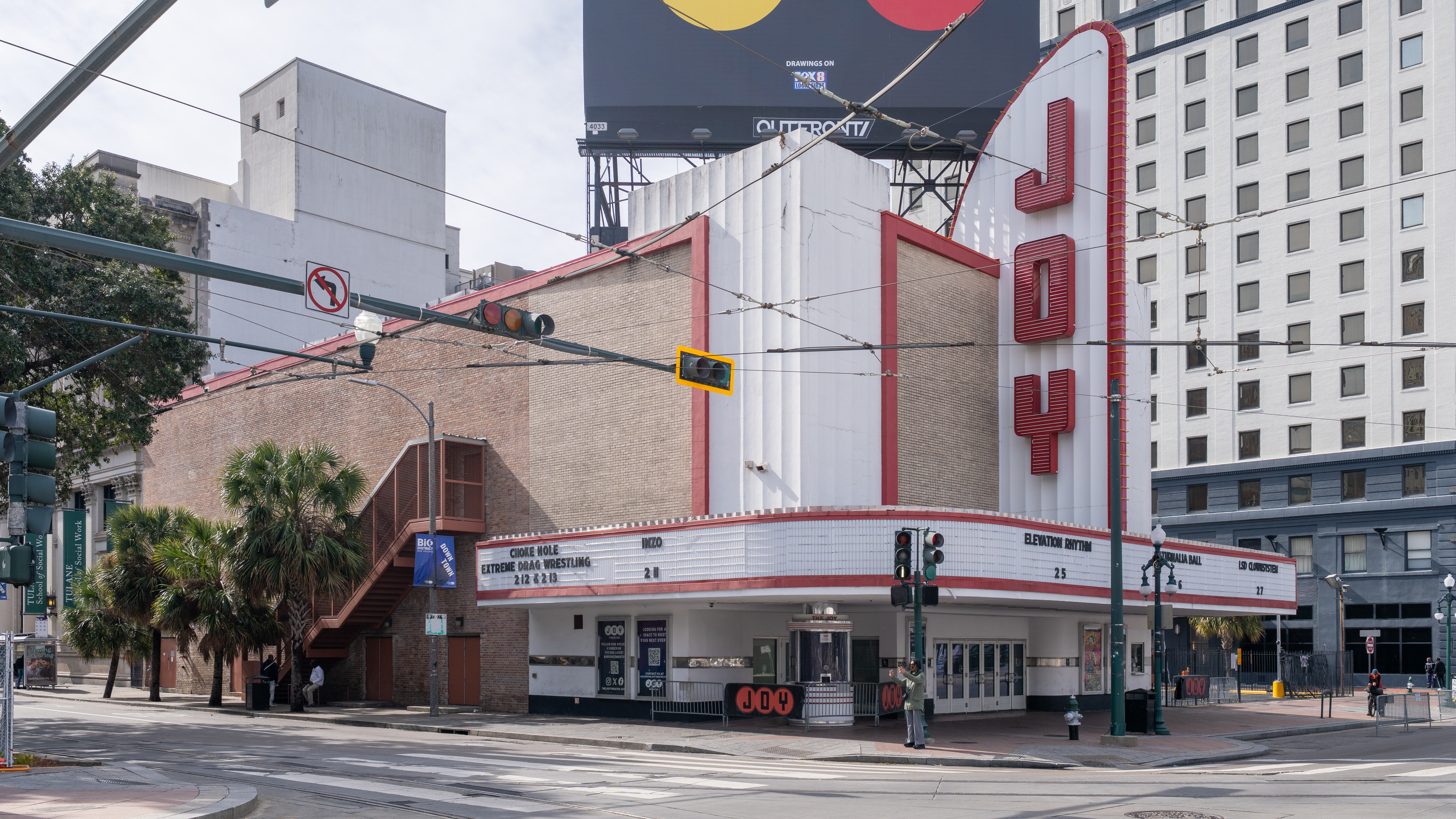
(2026)

== See also ==
- List of music venues
- Theatre in Louisiana
