= List of theaters in Louisiana =

There are many theatre groups and venues for the performing arts in Louisiana, most notably in New Orleans.

== Abbeville ==
- Abbey Players

== Alexandria ==
- Coughlin-Saunders Performing Arts Center
- Hearn Stage at The Kress Theatre
- Rapides Opera House

== Baton Rouge ==
- Greek Theatre
- Reilly Theatre
- Raising Cane's River Center
- Manship Theatre
- Southern University Theatre

== Hammond ==
- Columbia Theatre for the Performing Arts

== Metairie ==
- Jefferson Performing Arts Center

== New Orleans ==
- Anthony Bean Community Theater
- Carver Theater
- Civic Theatre
- Joy Theater
- Le Petit Theatre du Vieux Carre
- Mahalia Jackson Theater of the Performing Arts
- Orpheum Theater
- Saenger Theatre
- State Palace Theatre

== Ponchatoula ==
- Swamplight Theatre

== Shreveport ==
- RiverView Theater
- Shreveport Municipal Memorial Auditorium
- Strand Theatre

== St. Martinville ==
- Duchamp Opera House

== Thibodaux ==
- Thibodaux Playhouse, Inc.
