= Jefferson Performing Arts Center (Louisiana) =

Coordinates: 29.97628°N 90.20367°W

- JPAC
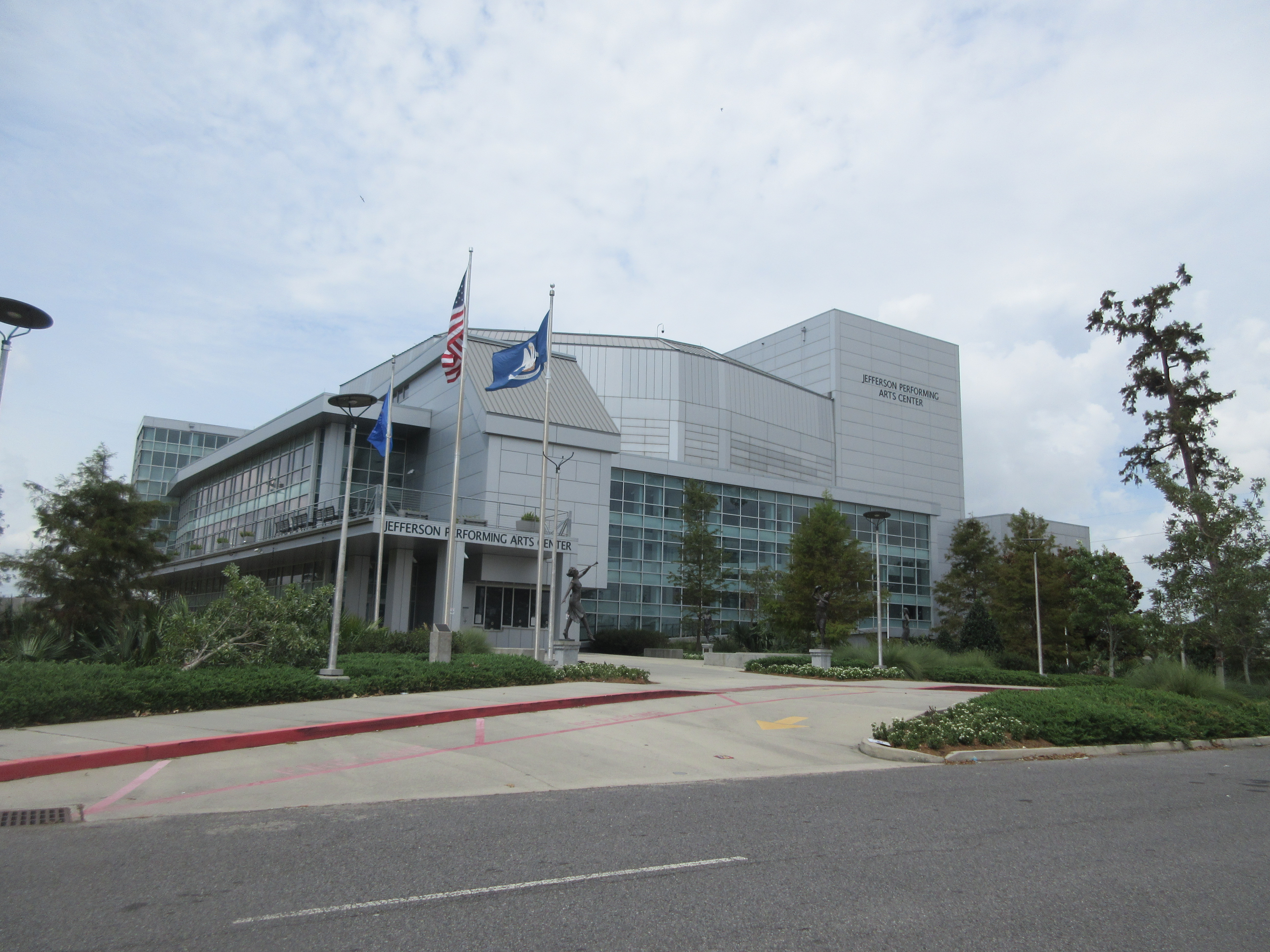
- Interactive map of Jefferson Performing Arts Center
- Address: 6400 Airline Drive; Metairie, Louisiana; United States
- Owner: Jefferson Parish, Louisiana
- Capacity: 1,041
- Type: Live Event Venue
- Current use: Performing arts venue

Construction
- Opened: June 19, 2015

Website
- https://www.jeffersonpac.com/

The Jefferson Performing Arts Center is a 1,041-seat live event venue located in Jefferson Parish in Metairie, Louisiana. The venue was designed to host grand operas, musicals, symphonies, choral concerts, ballet and private or corporate events. The venue is currently managed by the Jefferson Performing Arts Society.

The $54.5 million performing arts center features an acoustically designed interior, a 51-ft. proscenium arch stage with a mechanical orchestra lift, a theatrical fly rigging system, four star-dressing rooms and six ensemble-dressing rooms. The theater inside the arts center is named after former Louisiana State Senator Ken Hollis, who helped secure funding for the theater.

== See also ==
- List of concert halls
- List of music venues
- List of opera houses
- Theater in Louisiana
