= Carver Theater (New Orleans) =

Theater in New Orleans, Louisiana, US

Coordinates: 29.96708°N 90.07665°W

Carver Theatre
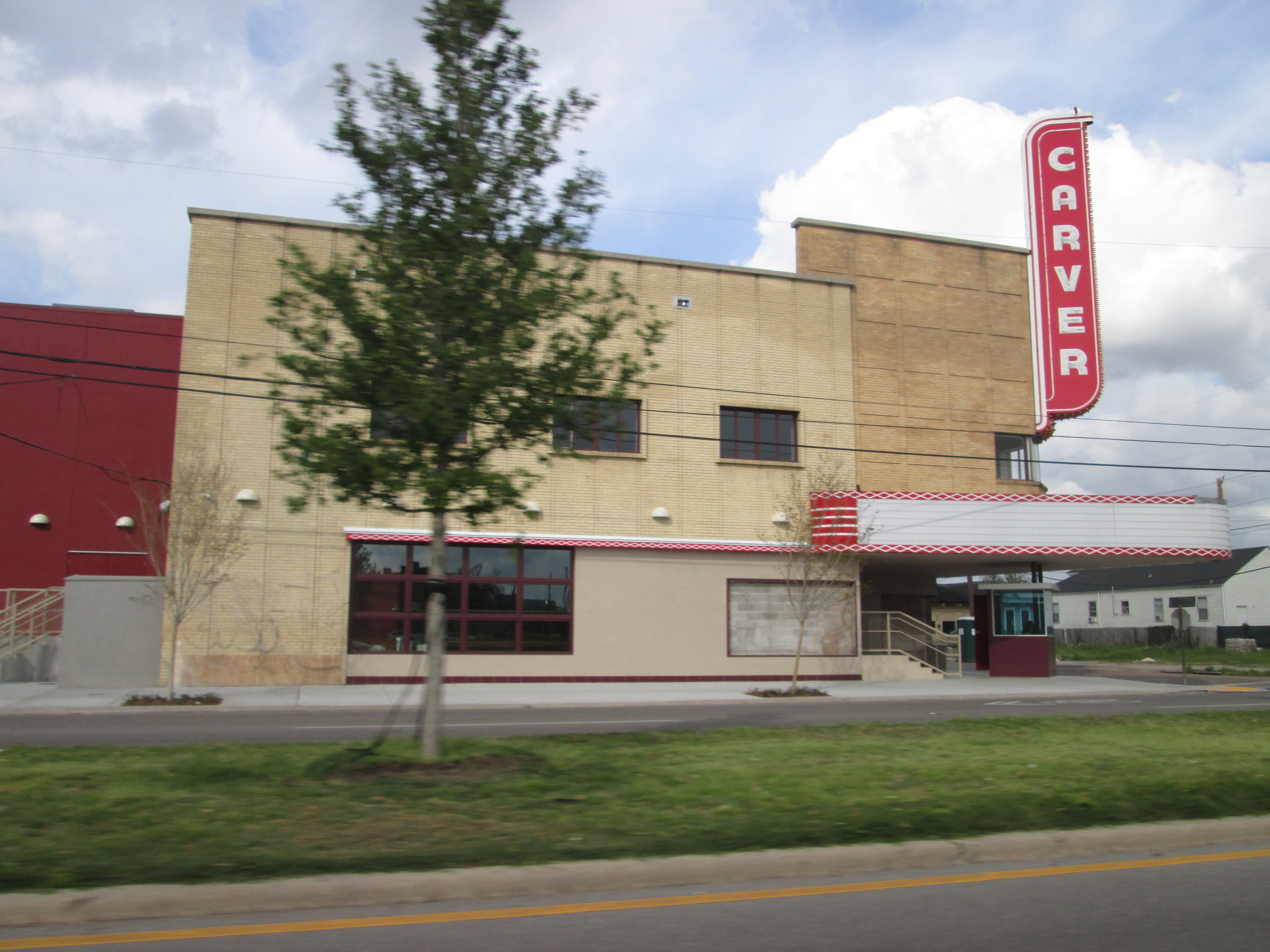
- Interactive map of Carver Theatre
- Address: 2101 Orleans Avenue; New Orleans, Louisiana; USA
- Type: Performing arts
- Capacity: 1,200
- Current use: Performing arts venue

Construction
- Opened: 1950
- Closed: 1980
- Reopened: 2014

Website
- Venue Website

The Carver Theatre is a theater located in New Orleans, Louisiana. The theatre was originally built in 1950 and was used for concerts, plays, off-broadway shows, films, conventions, graduations, Mardi Gras balls, dance recitals, corporate events and private parties.

== History ==
The Carver Theater, named after George Washington Carver, is on the National Register of Historic Places. It was built in 1950, as a state-of-the-art theaters for blacks in New Orleans. The Carver Theater retired as a movie theater in 1980 and became a housing office operation and medical clinic.

The theater sustained heavy damage from six feet of water during Hurricane Katrina. The building was completely renovated and opened in 2014 after a $8 million renovation. During the renovation, the building's wood frame and drywall were removed. The exterior architectural details were preserved, including the display windows which once held movie posters.

== See also ==
- List of music venues
- Theatre in Louisiana
- National Register of Historic Places listings in Orleans Parish, Louisiana
