= Greek Theatre (Baton Rouge) =

Coordinates: 30.41615°N 91.1804°W

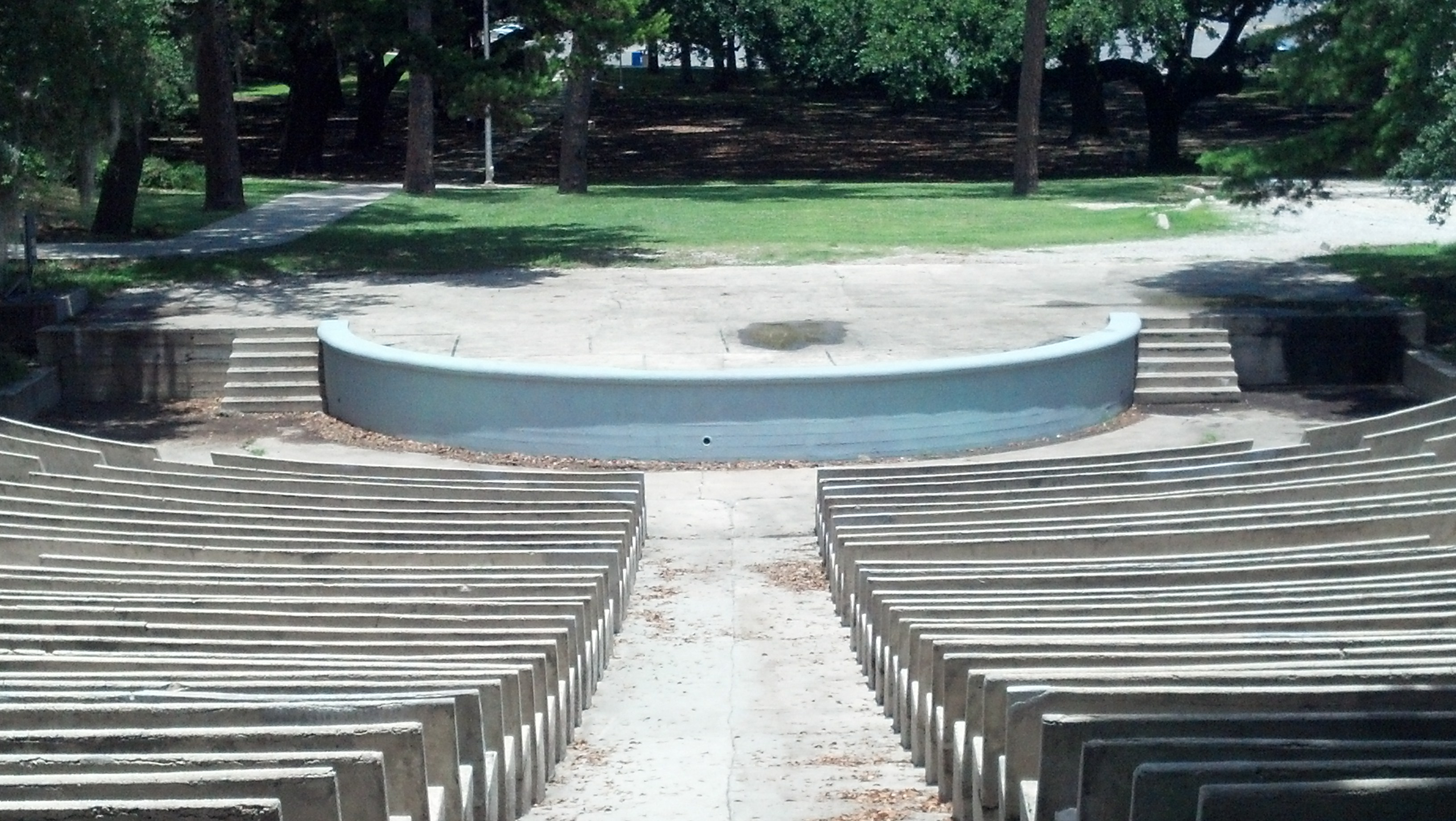
Greek Theatre (Baton Rouge)

The Greek Theatre in Baton Rouge, Louisiana is located on the campus of Louisiana State University. It opened in 1925 with seating for approximately 3,500. It was built to hold the entire university population and was once the location of major university assemblies.

== History ==
The theatre was built into a hill as a natural amphitheater and used for convocations, rallies, pageants and commencement exercises. In the early 1930s, the area behind the theatre was cleared and gardens were installed. The area was named the "Sunken Gardens" and was landscaped with shrubs and used existing trees for cover. A reflecting pool was also installed. The pool was 150 ft. long, 30 ft. wide and 2 ft. deep with an 8 ft. high statue of Spanish explorer Hernando de Soto located at the far end of the pool.

During Huey P. Long's reign as Governor of Louisiana, if he had an announcement for the entire student body, a large gong on campus would signal everyone on campus to rush to the Greek Theatre to hear the governor. One such announcement in 1934 was to inform the student body that he had secured several trains at a reduced fare to carry the entire student body to the Tigers away football game at Vanderbilt University in Nashville, Tennessee. He gave $7 to any student in need and accepted IOU's for the amount. Eventually, Governor Long ran out of money and he asked LSU President Jimmie Smith to pay for the remaining students.

Initially, the Illinois Central Railroad did not agree to the reduced fare. Governor Long then used his influence to "entice" the passenger agents of the railroad to give the students a reduced fare. He did this by threatening to reassess the value of the railroad bridges in the state from $100,000 to $4 million and the railroad agreed to the new fare.

In 1960 the theatre was still in use, but the reflecting pool was filled-in and replaced with a "formal garden". Ironically, the statue of de Soto was destroyed and thrown into the Mississippi River; the same fate as the Spanish discoverer. Over time, the side entrances to the "formal garden" were blocked, so in the 1970s the area became known as the "Enchanted Forest" as it became more secluded due to its lack of access.

== Current usage ==
During the late 1990s and early 2000s the area where the "sunken gardens", "formal garden" and "enchanted forest" were located was cleared of excess trees, overgrowth and obstructions and is now an open, tree shaded area. During the summers of 2001 and 2002, the Pass the Hat Festival presented a series of free Shakespeare productions including Macbeth and Julius Caesar. The theatre is currently managed by the University Union and is still used today for outdoor concerts, performances, religious ceremonies and a place for students and people to congregate.

In the fall of 2020, due to the Coronavirus pandemic, the LSU School of Music required rehearsals to be held outdoors. In August 2020, the Tiger Marching Band moved into the Greek Theater full time, where they held music rehearsals throughout the semester. Rehearsals were split between the Greek Theater and the Band's outdoor practice field. LSU's chamber music ensembles also used the theatre as a rehearsal venue. While this concluded after the COVID-19 pandemic the Schools of Music and Theatre along with associated clubs still use it for rehearsals, performances, and other academic activities.

== Gallery ==
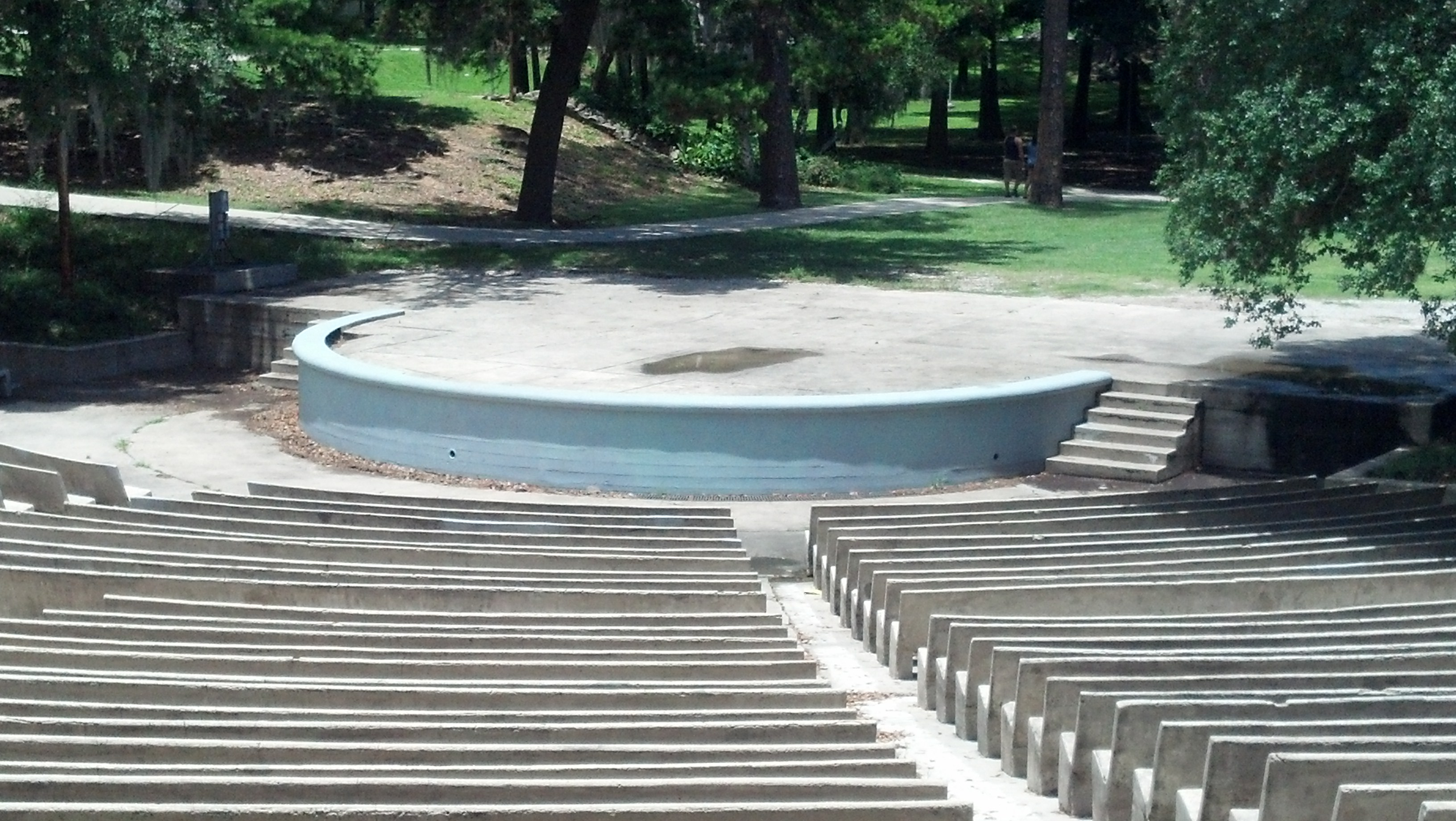
Greek Theatre (Baton Rouge)

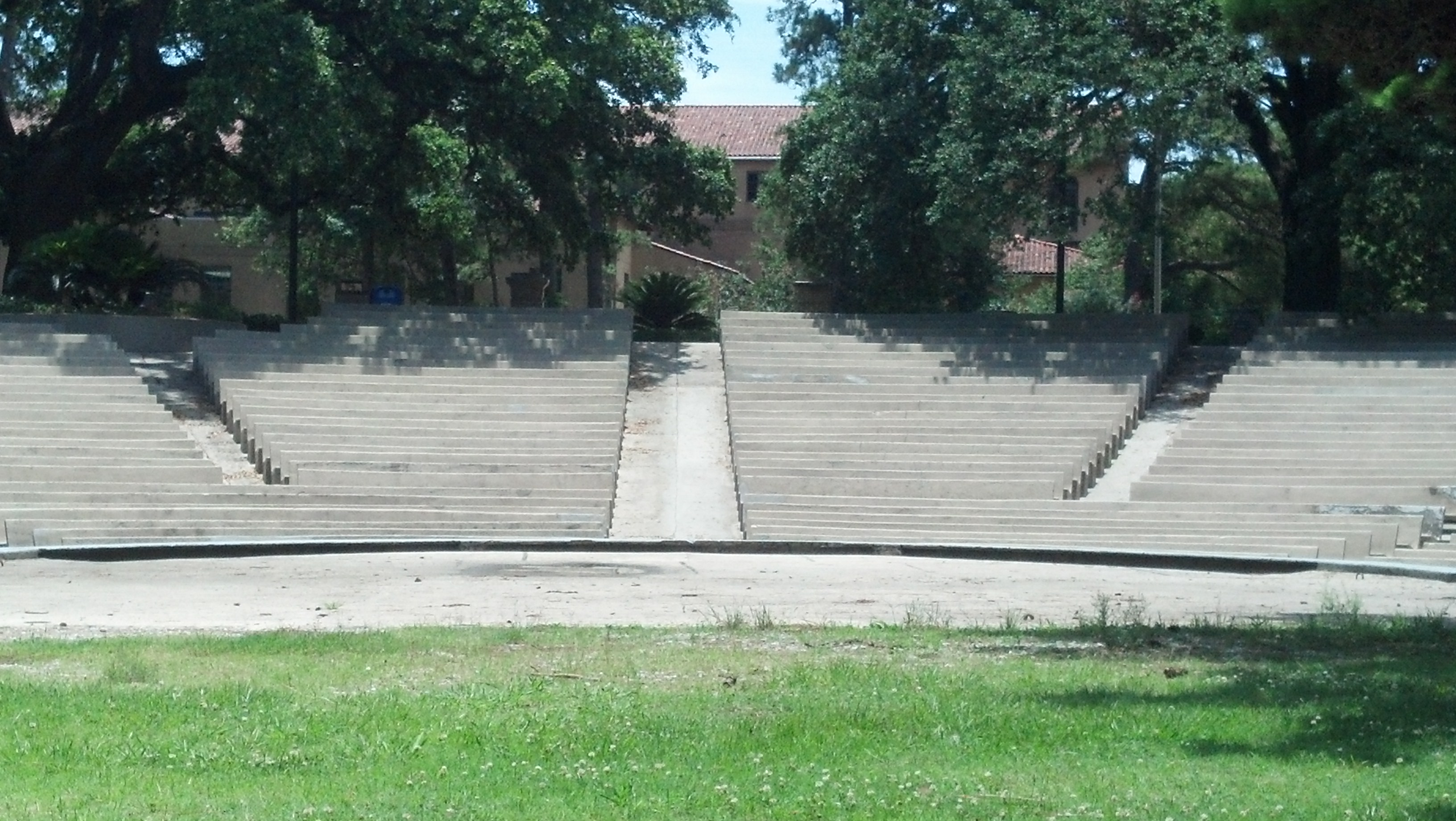
Greek Theatre (Baton Rouge) - Front Stage View

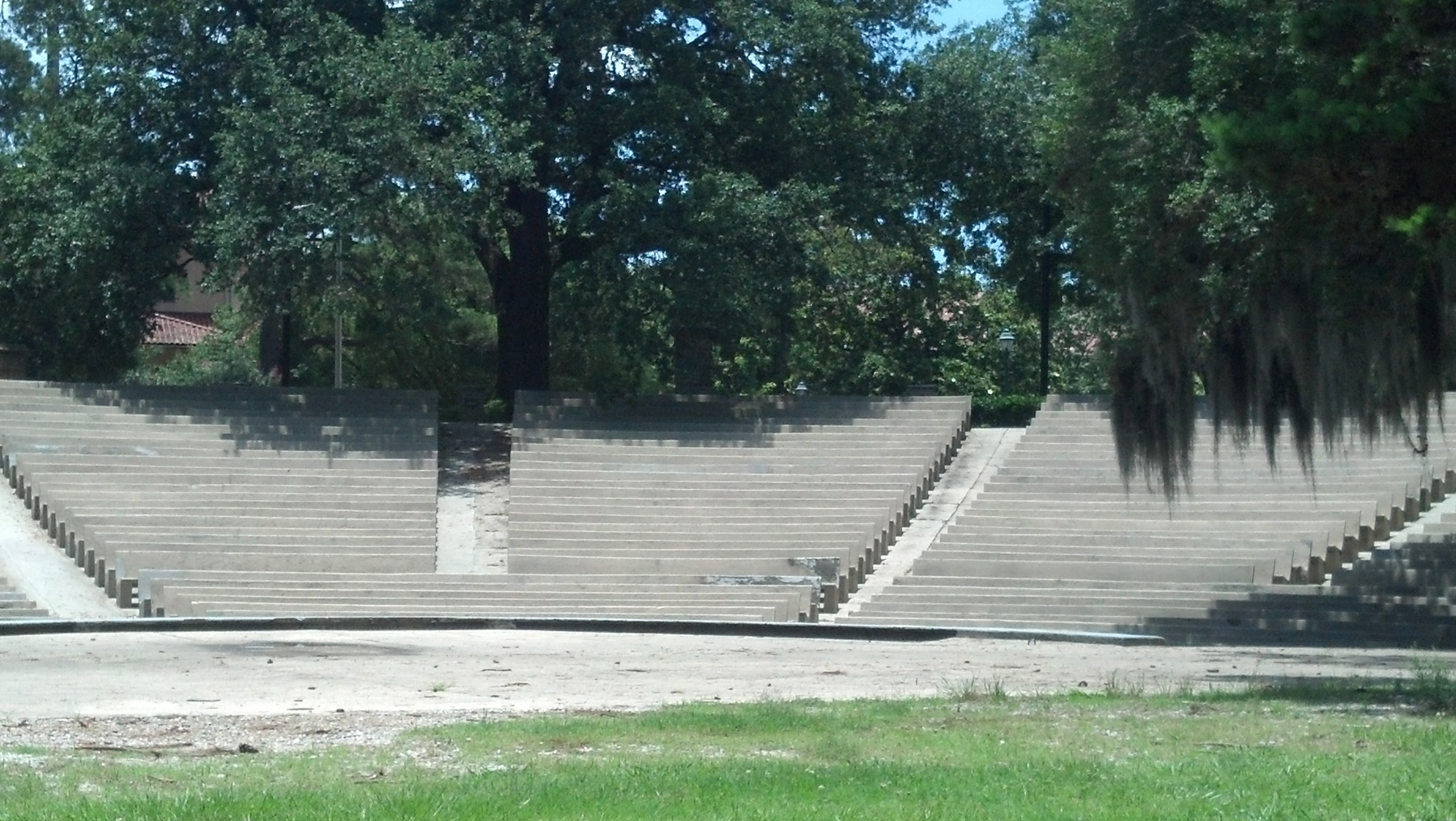
Greek Theatre (Baton Rouge) - Side Stage View

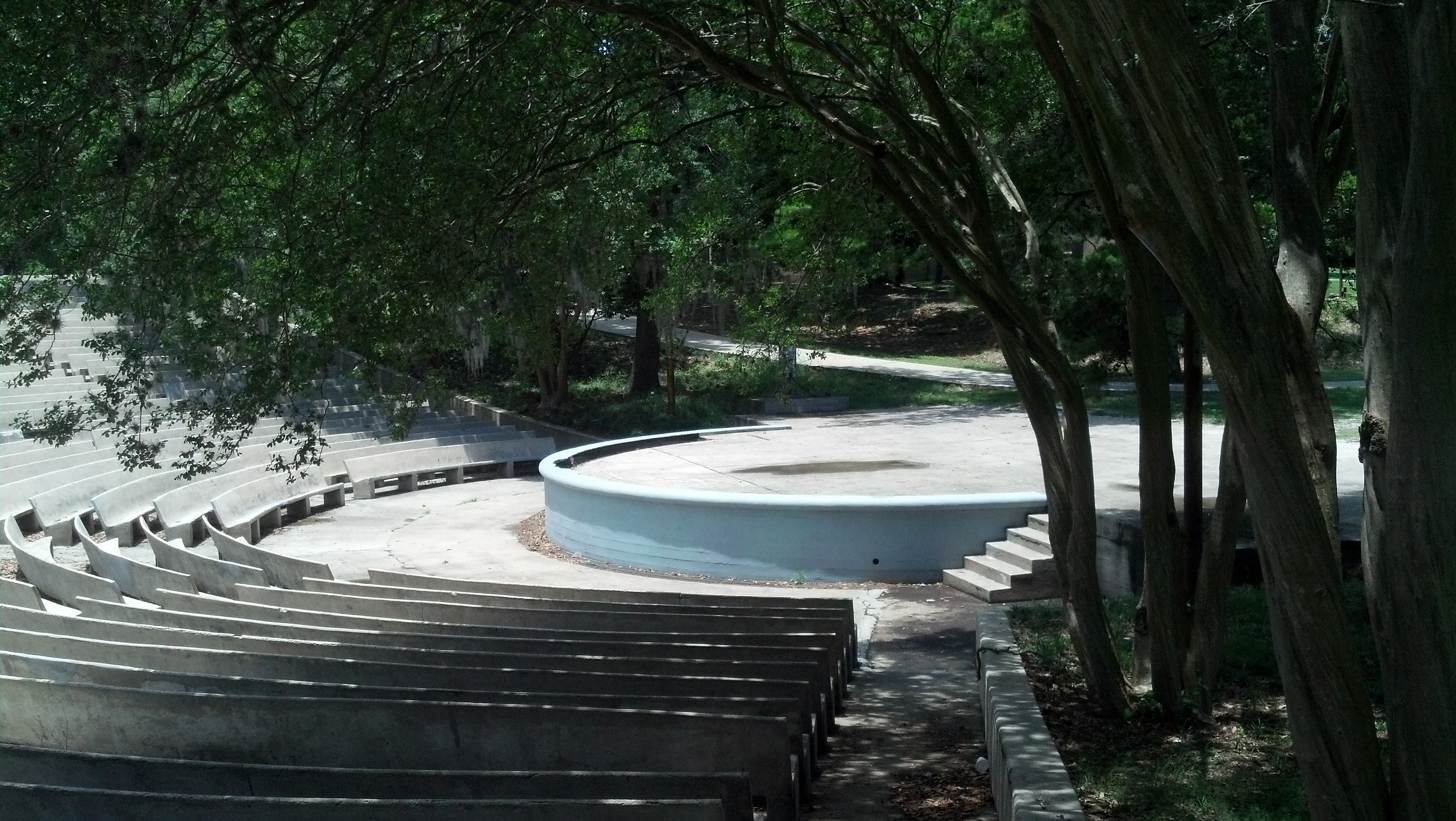
Greek Theatre (Baton Rouge) - Side View

== See also ==
- List of music venues
- Theater in Louisiana
