= Shreveport Symphony Orchestra =

Orchestra in Louisiana, United States

Coordinates: 32.514877°N 93.743233°W

Shreveport Symphony Orchestra (SSO)
- Orchestra
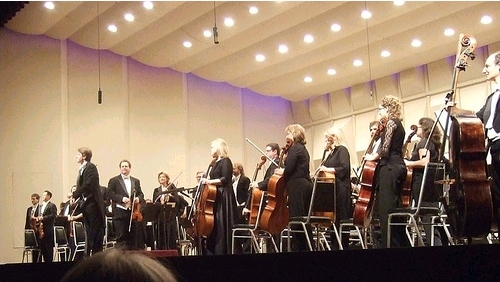
- Shreveport Symphony Orchestra (2010; Robert E. Trudeau)
- Founded: 1948
- Location: Shreveport, Louisiana
- Principal conductor: Michael Butterman
- Website: www.shreveportsymphony.com

The Shreveport Symphony Orchestra (SSO) is based in Shreveport, the seat of Caddo Parish and the largest city in north Louisiana. The SSO performs most of its concerts in the newly renovated RiverView Theater (formerly Shreveport Civic Theater). Founded in 1948, the symphony remains the longest continually performing professional orchestra in Louisiana.

The SSO belongs to the Louisiana Association of Symphony Orchestras (LASO) which was formed in August, 2003. LASO consists of all seven professional orchestras in Louisiana. The mission of the LASO is to promote and facilitate the interchange of ideas, advocate for the support of orchestras in the state, and coordinate collaborative projects in music education and other areas of mutual interest.

== History ==
=== Early years to 2003 ===
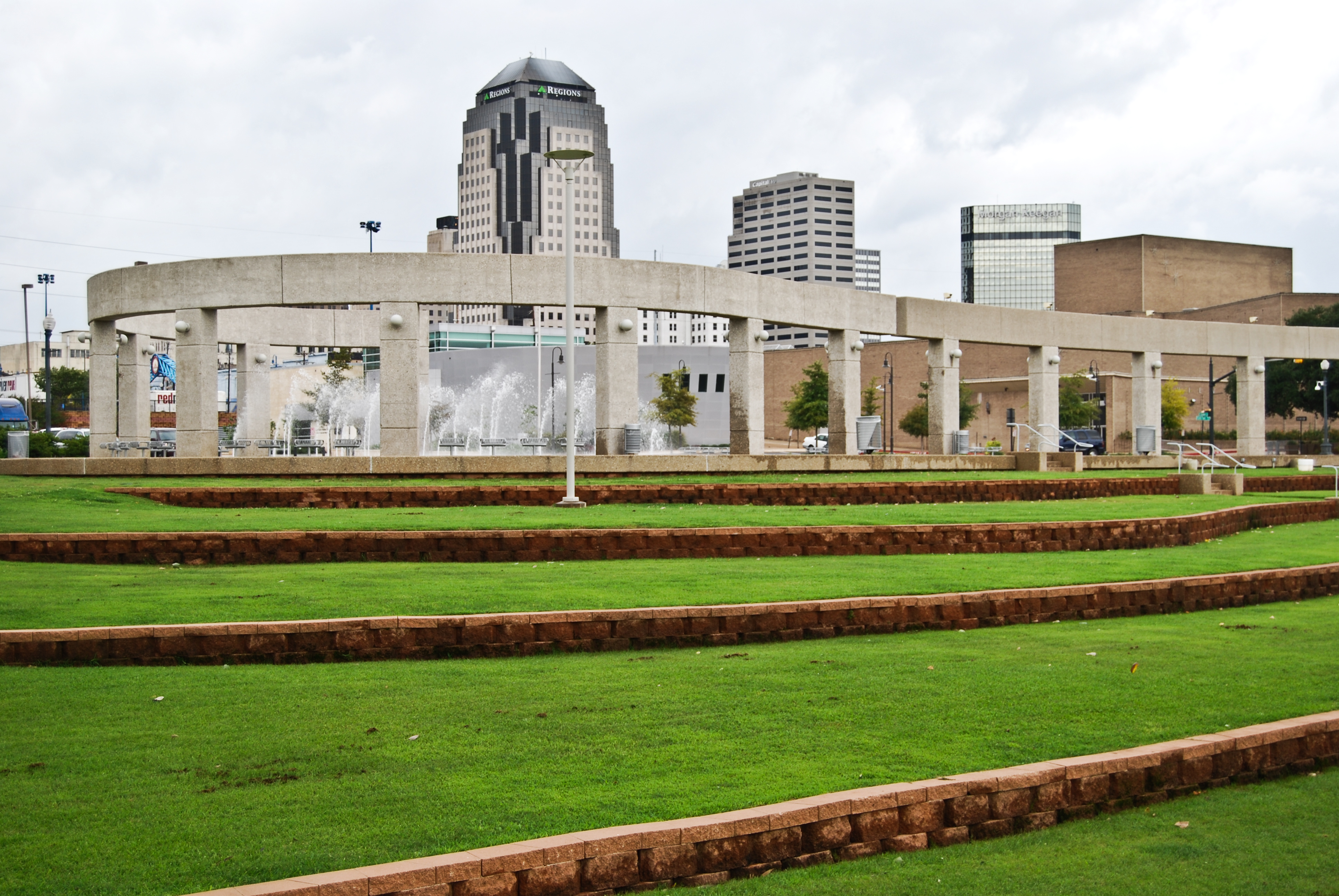
RiverView Theater in RiverView Park

Since its founding in 1948, the Shreveport Symphony Orchestra (SSO) has become Louisiana's oldest continually operating professional orchestra and one of the most respected regional orchestras in the United States. Presenting more than 200 concerts each season, over half of which are free educational events, the orchestra performs music of various genres, including classical and popular.

The SSO was formed by a handful of interested local citizens with founding music director, John Shenaut and it experienced tremendous growth until his retirement in 1981. After three years under Principal Conductor Paul Strauss followed by interim music director Marjorie Deutsch, the SSO selected Peter Leonard as its second music director and conductor in 1984, who remained with the Shreveport Symphony until 1996. Dennis Simons was selected as the SSO’s third music director and served from 1996 until 2003.

Under the stewardship of Leonard, and then Simons, the orchestra continued to grow as a cohesive unit, in relative stability, despite the effect of the oil bust during the 1980s on Shreveport's economy. However, into the new millennium, the orchestra's solvency was in a precarious state, as the core musicians risked being placed in a "per service" status, instead of receiving an annual guaranteed wage.

=== New conductor for Shreveport (2004 to Sept. 2008) ===
An international search for the orchestra's fourth music director began in the summer of 2003 and culminated with five finalists conducting the SSO during the 2004–2005 season. In August 2005, maestro Michael Butterman was appointed the fourth music director in the orchestra's 58-year history. Prior to his appointment, Butterman divided his time between Florida, New Mexico and New York where he served as the associate conductor of the Jacksonville Symphony Orchestra, music director of Opera Southwest, and principal conductor for education and outreach of the Rochester Philharmonic Orchestra. In 2007, he was named music director of the Boulder Philharmonic Orchestra as well. Kermit Poling, SSO Concertmaster for over 20 years, served as the interim music director/Resident Conductor during the 3 year transition period.

During the 2005–2006 season the orchestra presented eight Master Series concerts featuring various locally and nationally known soloists, a series of five Spotlight concerts (three with a chamber ensemble and two with a chamber orchestra—highlighting SSO musicians), In-School "Informances" (concerts with commentary) in elementary schools throughout the region, dozens of free Random Acts of Music, a free Picnic Pops concert in the spring with the Ark-La-Tex Youth Symphony and the annual free People's Concert, featuring local singers, narrators and gospel choirs. The year 2007–'08 was notable for being the SSO's 60th season, and the opening concert on September 15, 2007, was a memorable event, as the program shared a couple of selections with the first concert performed in November, 1948.

=== Musicians' strike (Oct. 2008 to Nov. 2009) ===
In October 2008 a musicians' strike nearly terminated its operation. All performances of the orchestra musicians under the auspices of the SSO were cancelled for the 2008–'09 season, and for part of the season 2009–'10. Prior to this strike, the SSO had annually presented more than two hundred concerts, the majority of which were free educational events.

The strike of the Shreveport Symphony musicians began in October 2008. Negotiations had begun in mid-2007, and since that time the orchestra musicians were playing without a contract, in expectation of a new bargaining agreement by the beginning of the 2008–'09 season. All performances of the orchestra musicians under the auspices of the SSO were cancelled for the 2008–'09 season, and for part of the season 2009–'10.

By March 2008, the symphony board's position had already spilled over to the SSO's own website, a tremendous gaffe for any organization. One such submission in the form of a press release was entitled Shreveport Symphony Orchestra Invites Musicians and Community To Embrace Board's Commitment to Fiscal Responsibility. Trying to promote one side of any labor dispute on the one page that is the face of the orchestra to the public is foolish and self-destructive, since it provides no reassurance to concertgoers that the organization stands a chance of surviving. The public should not be made to take sides in an issue that does not concern them. They are merely the audience, not the arbitrators. The audience may even turn against the management for such crude tactics, as was shown in the case of the Philadelphia Orchestra's dispute in 2004.

An editorial from The Times [Shreveport] in late March, 2008 summarized the critical situation at that time with respect to the financial status of the SSO.

The strike of orchestra musicians was necessitated by the refusal of the board of directors to compromise with the musicians' union on matters of salary and job security, issues not new to the symphony, as it had already weathered a nine-week strike during the 1996–'97 season, which culminated in a collective bargaining agreement on March 11, 1997.

The drastic budget cut that was narrowly averted in 2002 did finally come home to roost in 2008. The 2008–'09 season was officially canceled on January 30, 2009.

- Update~ Sept. 24, 2009
  Recently, there have been discussions between representatives of the symphony musicians and a new management team on behalf of the symphony, and naturally neither side wishes to comment while negotiations are pending. The "glimmer of hope" exists to bring these two sides together for an eventual agreement, as noted by an editorial comment in The Times of Shreveport, Opinion section, September 24, 2009.
- Update~ Nov. 27, 2009
  "After two years of contentious negotiations, The Shreveport Symphony Orchestra is back – for now." This information was just released during the last week in The Times [Shreveport], suggesting "a permanent return of live orchestral music" to Shreveport and its citizens. In his arts blog, Robert Trudeau reported that SSO board president Dick Bremer, Rick Rowell, the leader of the musicians group, and Community Fund chief Paula Hickman announced the interim agreement and a concert series consisting of three planned concerts.

=== Renewed concert season (2010 to 2011) ===
Following the enthusiastic response from the community to a new series of concerts, a more permanent agreement was reached in July, 2010. Shortly thereafter, the orchestra announced the official concert schedule for the 2010–'11 season.

As the Shreveport Symphony Orchestra embarked on the new season starting January 30, 2010, this group of talented, classically trained musicians, along with their devoted management team, would have to encourage the participation of a broader subscriber base, including the younger population of the Shreveport-Bossier City metro area. Innovative marketing and fresh ideas could enhance the appeal of live music to an ever-widening audience. Even two of the original Big Five orchestras, the Philadelphia Orchestra and the Cleveland Orchestra, have recently been subjected to the vagaries of the economy and the competitive nature of the entertainment/cultural industry.

The much-anticipated first concert of the 2010 season was a rousing success, judging from the attendance at the RiverView Theater yesterday evening. This bodes well for the future of this arts organization, as long as the momentum is carried on to attract new audience members to upcoming SSO programs. The final concert of the abbreviated season took place on May 15, 2010. Instead of the traditional annual Picnic Pops concert, which was usually held outdoors on the riverfront, this year the SSO and the Ark-La-Tex Youth Symphony Orchestra (ALTYSO) joined together for a free indoor concert on May 30, 2010. Michael Butterman explained it this way, "We're doing much the same thing, but this time indoors," he said. "We will open with the youth orchestra playing a couple of things on its own and then the symphony will play on its own and then they will play together." The program included works by Ralph Vaughan Williams, Richard Wagner and Gustav Holst, as well as music from "Fiddler on the Roof," and "The King and I: A Symphonic Portrait."

By the end of May 2010, a decision was to be made by the symphony board about the 2010–'11 season. This decision was postponed, to allow the remaining issues to be discussed at a meeting between the orchestra musicians and the board, scheduled for Mon., July 12, 2010. Later that week, an agreement was reached between the board and musicians, allowing for the symphony to continue operating for at least another two years.

On May 14, 2011, the SSO completed another successful season with a spectacular program including works by Smetana, Brahms and Dvořák, with a world-renowned violinist, Rachel Barton Pine, featuring in the Brahms Violin Concerto in D Major.

During the concert season 2010–2011, the SSO was able to acquire at least 50 new subscribers. Brian Hebert, Shreveport Symphony board president, was pleased with the state of the orchestra after the foregoing season, and attributed the solid financial footing in part to the reorganization of the symphony and significant concessions made by the musicians.

=== New executive director chosen (2011 to 2013) ===
Lois Robinson was named as the new executive director of the SSO, starting on August 22, 2011. She had previously been general manager of the Louisiana Philharmonic Orchestra in New Orleans, especially helping to rebuild that orchestra after the devastation of Hurricane Katrina. "I am so impressed by the energy and commitment I have seen to make the SSO the best it can possibly be, and am convinced that there will be many opportunities for the organization to serve the community better than ever," Robinson said in a news release. She was interviewed just before the first concert of the new season, and explained her plans to strengthen and expand the role of the orchestra in the community, while increasing the administrative capacity of the orchestra to support that expansion. September 24, 2011, was the beginning of a new era for this orchestra, and the variety of the programming included a guest appearance by one of America's most accomplished cellists, Zuill Bailey, in Elgar's famous Cello Concerto in E minor.

Robinson replaced the interim general manager, Leah Escude, who served the orchestra well in the 2010–2011 season. Escude helped to give the SSO a new face in the public eye, through clever use of the social media on the internet, such as Facebook and Twitter, and helped to recover the orchestra's prestige in the wake of a difficult strike in 2008.

=== Unified vision (2014 to present) ===
More recently, in June 2014, the SSO musicians and management reached a collective bargaining agreement, which ensured the continuing growth and prosperity of this orchestra. The SSO conductor, Michael Butterman, stated that the new agreement indicated a unified vision and a sense of common purpose shared by all members of the SSO organization.

== Orchestra members ==
Kermit Poling retired from his post as concertmaster of the SSO, after his 27th season with the SSO. Poling has kept his post as associate conductor for the SSO, in addition to being the music director of both the South Arkansas Symphony and the Shreveport Metropolitan Ballet.

SSO musicians belong to the Shreveport Federation of Musicians, known as Local 116 of the American Federation of Musicians of the United States and Canada. In October, 2008, during the musicians' strike, the SSO orchestra members formed Orchestra Players United of Shreveport-Bossier (OPUS). With the OPUS Orchestra, they were able to continue performing for the duration of the strike, supported by CODA (Concert Organizers for Diversity in the Arts of Northwest Louisiana), a non-profit organization.

Every major SSO concert has been broadcast on Red River Radio, the regional public radio network operating at Louisiana State University in Shreveport. Kermit Poling hosts the program, Regional Symphony Broadcasts which reaches nearly 50,000 listeners each week. He also serves as general manager and classical announcer and producer of Red River Radio.

In 2014, Matt Albert was appointed as the new concertmaster of the SSO. Mr. Albert had performed previously in a chamber music series in Shreveport, as well as in the guest concertmaster role with the SSO. Albert left the SSO in 2016 for another opportunity.

== Other related links ==
- Ark-La-Tex Youth Symphony Orchestra (ALTYSO)
- Centenary Suzuki School
- A blogsite for all Shreveport musicians and supporters
- Trudeau on Shreveport, a Blue Hole of the arts and crafts
- Shreveport Blog: "covers news and reviews of arts, entertainment and civic issues that affect NW Louisiana."
- Greg Sandow on the future of classical music
