= Shaw Center for the Arts =

Arts venue in Baton Rouge, Louisiana, US

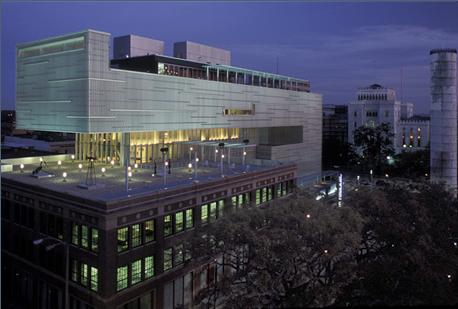
- The Shaw Center at night, with the Old Louisiana State Capitol in the background
- Interactive map of the Shaw Center for the Arts area
- Former names: The Arts Block

General information
- Location: Baton Rouge, Louisiana
- Coordinates: 30.4478°N 91.189°W
- Completed: 2005
- Owner: Shaw Center LLC

Design and construction
- Architects: Schwartz/Silver Architects, Eskew+Dumez+Ripple, Jerry M. Campbell & Associates
- Structural engineer: McKee & Deville Consulting Engineers
- Services engineer: M&E Consulting
- Civil engineer: Ferris Engineering & Surveying, LLC
- Other designers: Hargreaves Associates (Landscape Architect)
- Main contractor: The Lemoine Company
- Awards and prizes: 2008 AIA National Honor Award

Website
- www.shawcenter.org

The Shaw Center for the Arts is a 125,000 square foot (12,000 m²) performing art venue, fine arts museum, and education center located at 100 Lafayette Street in downtown Baton Rouge, Louisiana. It opened in 2005. The Center includes the LSU Museum of Art, the LSU School of Art Glassell Gallery, the 325-seat Manship Theatre, classrooms, Tsunami, a rooftop sushi restaurant, and a park. Among other collections, the museum includes the largest assemblage of Newcomb Pottery in the United States.

The skin of the Shaw Center for the Arts is made of translucent channel glass manufactured in Germany by Glasfabrik Lamberts. The Shaw Center received the American Institute of Architects Gulf States Honor Award in 2005 for its "aggressive concept with a good contrast of materials" and "effective mapping of façade upon the plaza" .

The center was built with both public and private funding. The Shaw Group was a major donor to Shaw Center for the Arts, and received the naming rights to the building, however the Shaw Center is neither owned by The Shaw Group nor do they share employees. Other major donors were the Manship families, the Pennington families and Lamar Advertising, which is based in Baton Rouge (Lamar and Reilly families).

The Shaw Center has won several awards for design excellence including:

- 2008 American Institute of Architects (AIA) National Honor Award
- 2005 AIA Gulf States Region Honor Award
- 2005 AIA New England Region Honor Award
- 2005 Boston Society of Architects Award for Design
- 2005 Boston Society of Architects Higher Education Award Citation

The architects are

- Design Architect: Schwartz/Silver Architects, Boston, MA
- Executive Architect: Eskew+Dumez+Ripple, New Orleans, LA
- Associated Architect: Jerry M. Campbell & Associates, Baton Rouge, LA

== LSU Museum of Art ==
The LSU Museum of Art opened in March 2005. The museum collection includes a diverse art collection, changing exhibitions, education programs, and special events.

== LSU School of Art Glassell Gallery ==
The Alfred C. Glassell Jr. Exhibition Gallery at the Shaw Center for the Arts is the LSU School of Art's exhibition space. Visitors can view works by contemporary artists from around the country, follow the development of LSU School of Art students, and see the most recent work of School of Art faculty.

== Manship Theatre ==
The Manship Theatre is a 325-seat performing arts theater used for concerts, theater performances, musicals, dance recitals and films.

== See also ==
- List of concert halls
- List of music venues
- Theatre in Louisiana
