= Femi Euba =

Nigerian actor, writer and dramatist (born 1939)

- Born: Femi Euba; April 2, 1939 (age 86–87); Lagos State, Nigeria
- Education: Rose Bruford College; Yale School of Drama; University of Ife
- Occupations: Actor and dramatist

Femi Euba (born April 1939) is a Nigerian actor, writer, and dramatist, who has published numerous works of drama, theory, and fiction. His work as a theatre practitioner encompasses acting, playwriting, and directing. Among the topics of his plays is Yoruba culture.

== Education and career ==
Born in Lagos, Nigeria, the son Alphaeus Sobiyi Euba and Winifred Remilekun Euba (née Dawodu), Femi Euba studied acting in England at the Rose Bruford College of Speech and Drama, earning a diploma in 1965, after which he appeared in many shows on the London stage, including the 1966 Royal Court Theatre productions of Wole Soyinka's The Lion and the Jewel (as Lakunle the Schoolteacher), and Shakespeare's Macbeth, with the late Sir Alec Guinness as Macbeth and the late Simone Signoret as Lady Macbeth, directed by William Gaskill.

Euba left London in 1970 to study Playwriting and Dramatic Literature at the Yale School of Drama, where his received an MFA in 1973. In 1980–82, he went back to Yale to study, receiving an MA in Afro-American Studies. He then returned to Nigeria, where he worked for some years, and earned a PhD in Literature-in-English at the University of Ife, Nigeria (now Obafemi Awolowo University), in 1986.

Over the years, Euba has taught at different colleges and universities, in Nigeria and the US, including the College of William & Mary in Virginia. Currently the Louise and Kenneth Kinney Professor at Louisiana State University, he has continued to teach playwriting, and dramatic literature, mostly concentrating on the drama and theatre of Africa and of the African diaspora. He is also a consultant in Black Theatre.

Among his many credits as a director are Soyinka's Death and the King's Horseman (2008) and The Trials of Brother Jero (1988); Edouard Glissant's Monsieur Toussaint (1990); August Wilson's Joe Turner's Come and Gone (1994); Shakespeare's The Tempest (2005); Molière's The Learned Ladies (1991); Euripides' Alcestis (2001); Athol Fugard's Sizwe Bansi is Dead (1992–93), Richard Brinsley Sheridan's The Rivals (1996), The African Company Presents Richard III (1998), Henrik Ibsen's Hedda Gabler (1999), Maryse Condé's Tropical Breeze Hotel (2003), Eduardo Machado's Broken Eggs (2009), Stephen Adly Guirgis's Our Lady of 121st Street (2011), Tarell Alvin McCraney's The Brothers Size (2012), and Bruce Norris's Clybourne Park (2013).

Euba's archive is held with the performing arts collections at the Harry Ransom Center in Austin, Texas. His papers include scripts, recordings, lecture notes, correspondence, photographs, and other ephemera.

== Works ==
- "Akibu: a play for television in two parts" in Five African Plays; ed. Cosmo Pieterse. London: Heinemann Educational Books, 1972.
- A Riddle of the Palms and Crocodiles (plays), Negro Ensemble Company, 1973.
- Archetypes, Imprecators and Victims of Fate: Origins and Developments of Satire in Black Drama, Greenwood Press, 1989, ISBN 0-313-25557-1
- The Gulf, Longman, 1991.
- "The Eye of Gabriel" (play), in Black Drama, Alexander Street Press, 2002.
- "Dionysus of the Holocaust" (play), in Black Drama, Alexander Street Press, 2002.
- Poetics of the Creative Process: An Organic Practicum to Playwriting, University Press of America, 2005.
- Camwood at Crossroads (novel), Xlibris, 2007.(Self-published)
