= Independence Park Botanic Gardens =

Botanical gardens in Baton Rouge, Louisiana

- Interactive map of Independence Park Botanic Gardens
- Type: Public
- Location: Baton Rouge, Louisiana
- Coordinates: 30.4446°N 91.1059°W

The Independence Park Botanic Gardens are botanical gardens located in Independence Park at 7950 Independence Boulevard, Baton Rouge, Louisiana. They are open during daylight hours without admission fee.

The Gardens contain displays of blooming woody plants, ground covers, and wetland plants. They include a rose garden, crape myrtle garden, sensory garden, and children's forest.

== See also ==
- List of botanical gardens in the United States
