= Shreveport Opera =

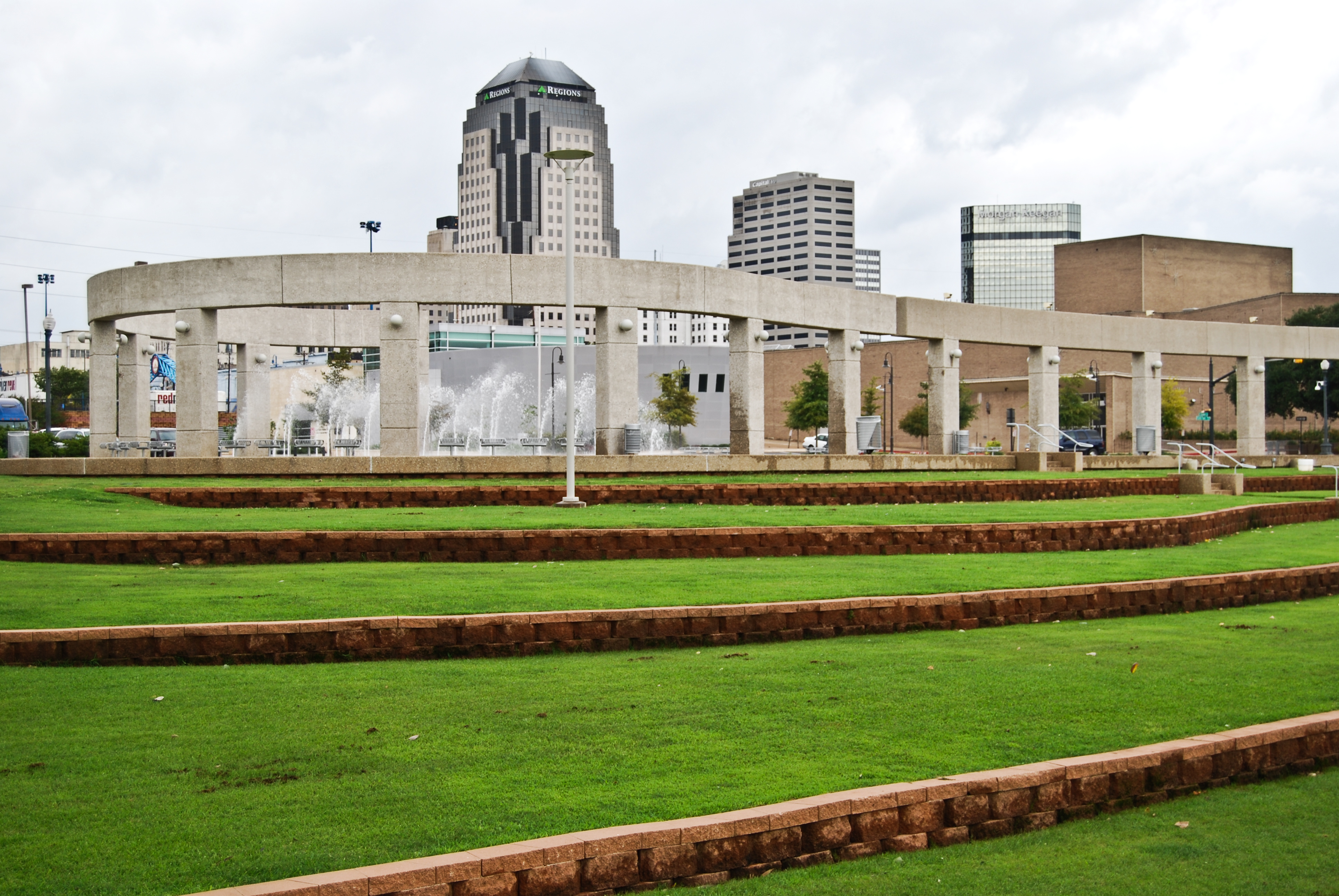
- RiverView Theater in RiverView Park
- Interactive map of Shreveport Opera
- Address: 6969 Fern Loop, Suite 206; Shreveport; U.S.
- Coordinates: 32.514736°N 93.747261°W

Construction
- Opened: late 1940s
- Years active: 1940s–present

Website
- www.shreveportopera.org

The Shreveport Opera is an opera company in the city of Shreveport, Louisiana, United States. The opera performs at the RiverView Theater with its offices located at 6969 Fern Loop, suite 206 The opera began in the late 1940s and has continued until the present day. It is the second largest of four opera companies in the state. In the 1960s, many famous singers appeared in Shreveport including Placido Domingo, Lucine Amara, Teresa Stratas, and Beverly Sills.
