= Shreveport Metropolitan Ballet =

The Shreveport Metropolitan Ballet (SMB) was founded in 1973 as the Ballet Lyrique in the Shreveport-Bossier City area. It is currently run by Kathryn McDowell.

Each year "Fall for Dance!" is performed in conjunction with other local dance groups. SMB annually presents two full-length classical ballets, including the holiday ballet The Nutcracker and a performance each spring of other ballets from the classical repertoire. The audiences come not only from the Shreveport-Bossier City areas, but also from East Texas, southern Arkansas, and small communities throughout north Louisiana.

Dancers from ages ten to adult are chosen each spring by open auditions to become members of the Junior, Senior Apprentice, and Senior companies of the Ballet. The existence of the Ballet has provided these dancers with the necessary training and experience to go on to dance with companies in other cities and to study dance at the university level. Guest artists have come from such ballets as the New York City Ballet, the Boston Ballet, the Houston Ballet, Oklahoma City Ballet, and the San Francisco Ballet.
