= List of convention centers in the United States =

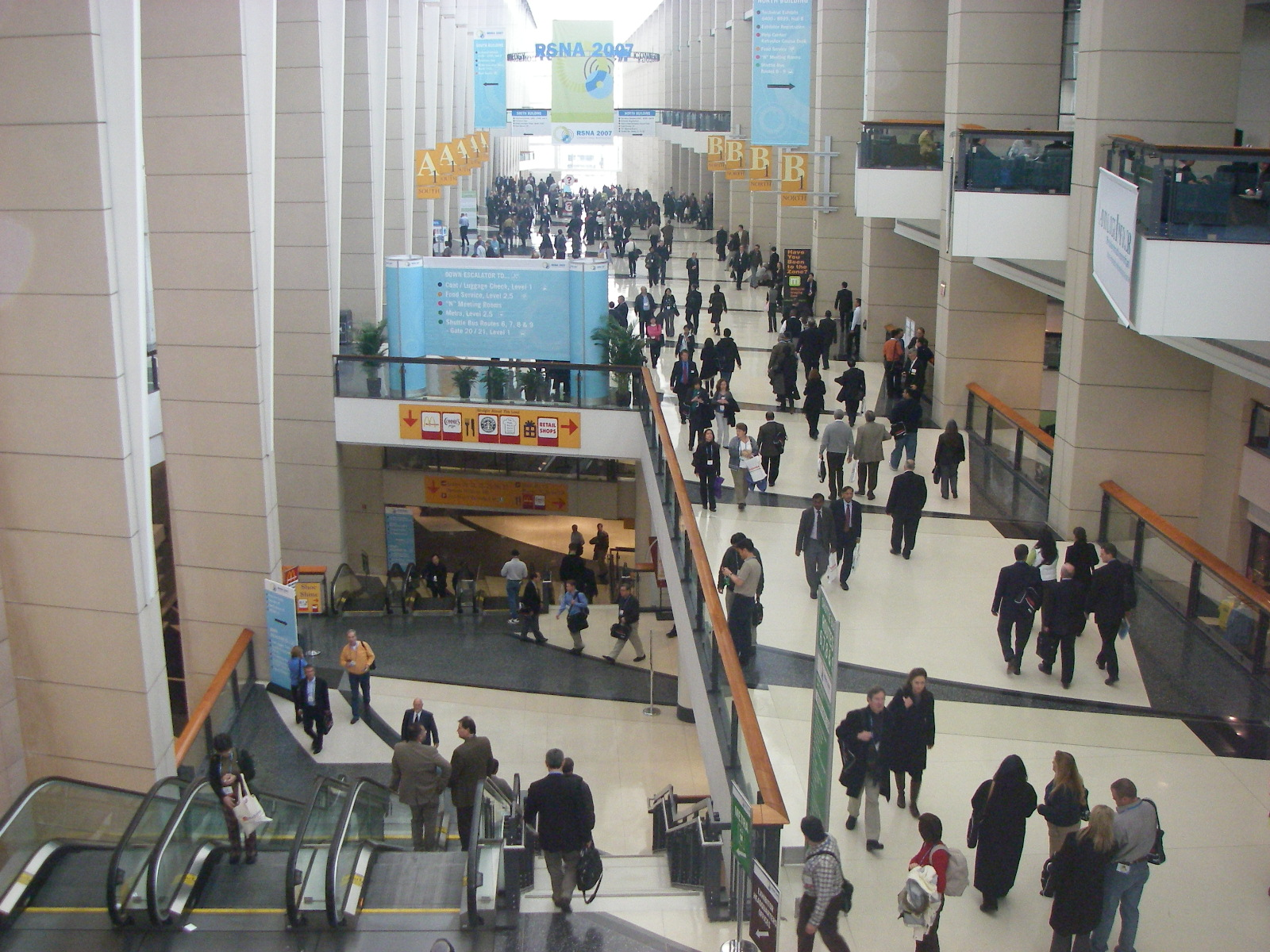
The Grand Concourse of McCormick Place in Chicago, Illinois

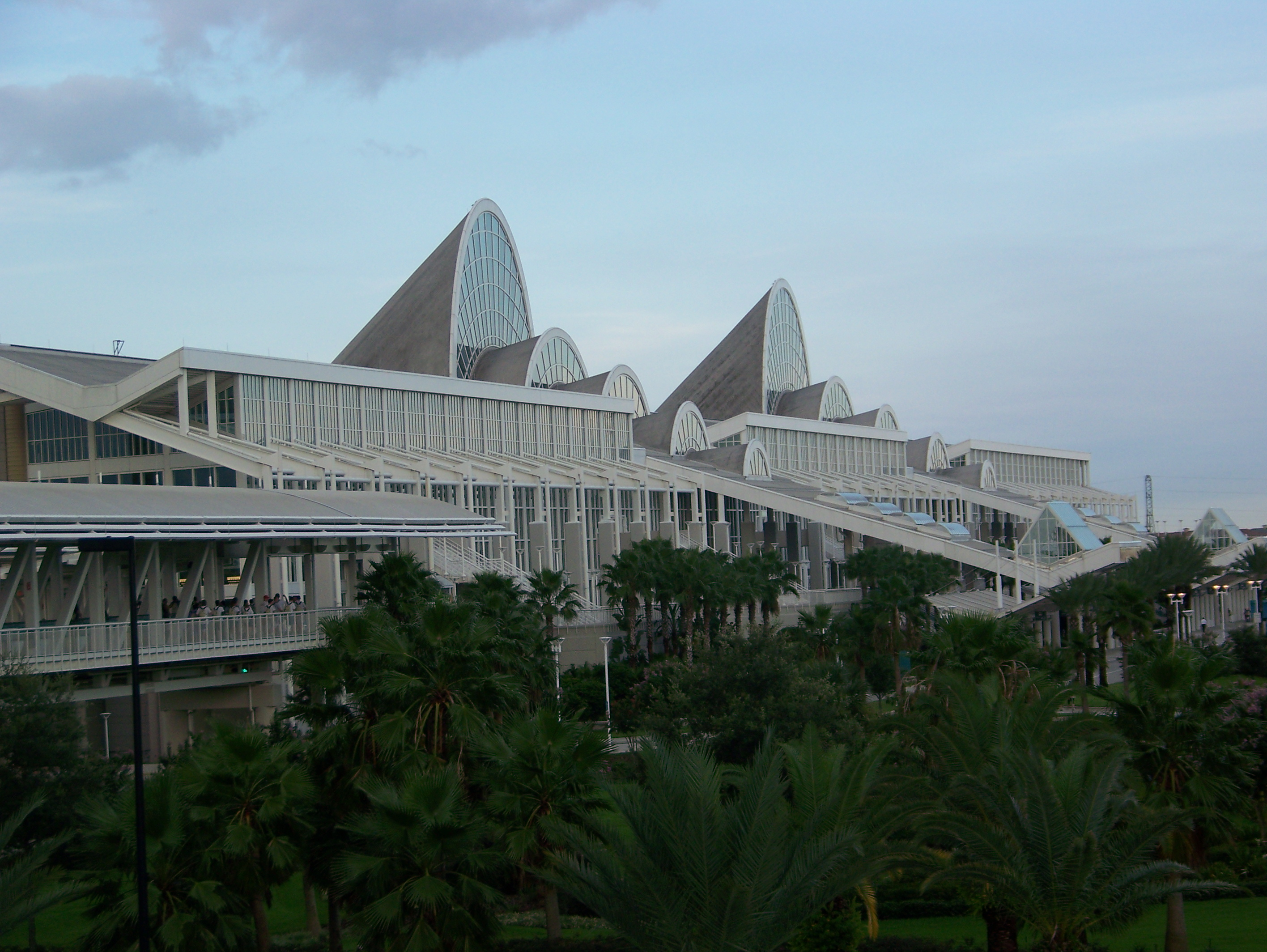
The Orange County Convention Center in Orlando, Florida

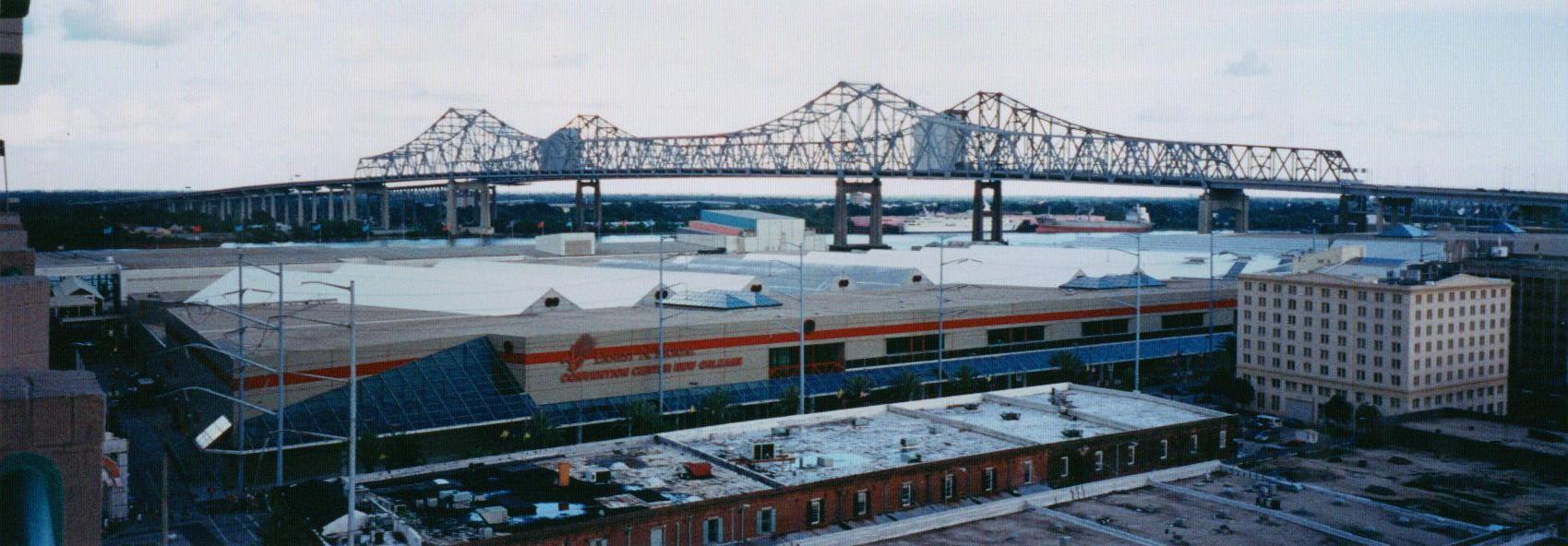
The New Orleans Morial Convention Center in New Orleans, Louisiana

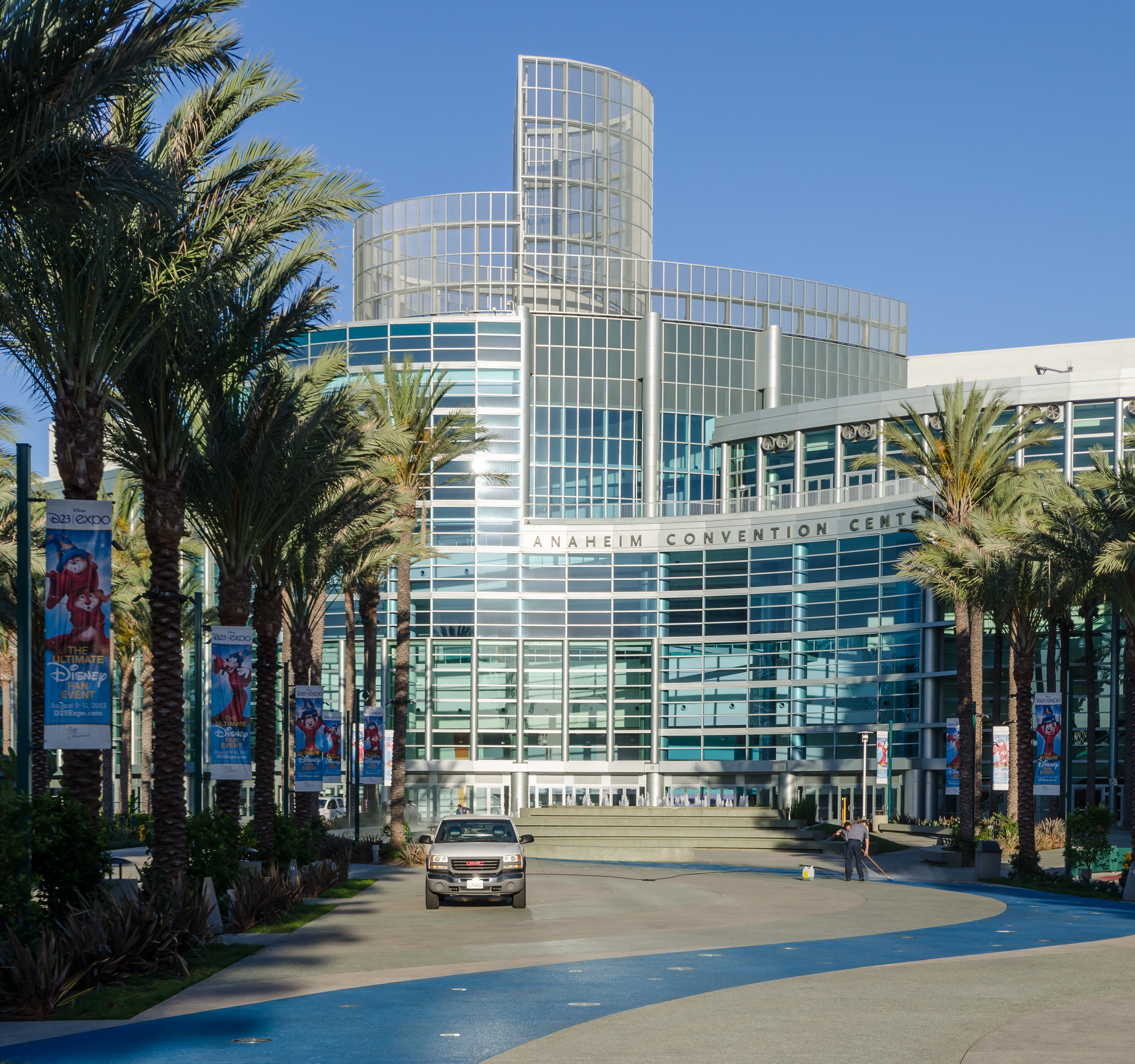
The Anaheim Convention Center in Anaheim, California

This is a list of convention centers in the United States by state and insular area.

== By state ==
=== Alabama ===
- Bald Rock Lodge (Cheaha State Park)
- Bessemer Civic Center
- Birmingham–Jefferson Convention Complex
- Bryant Convention Center (Tuscaloosa)
- Celebration Arena (Decatur)
- Daphne Civic Center
- Lake Guntersville State Park Conference Center
- Lakepoint Resort Lodge (Eufaula)
- Mobile Convention Center
- Monte Sano State Park (Huntsville)
- Ozark Civic Center
- Pelham Civic Center
- The Lodge at Gulf State Park (Gulf Shores)
- Von Braun Center (Huntsville)

=== Alaska ===
- Dena'ina Center
- Egan Center

=== Arizona ===
- Mesa Convention Center
- Mojave Crossing (Fort Mohave)
- Phoenix Convention Center
- Tucson Convention Center
- Walkup Skydome (Flagstaff)
- WestWorld (Scottsdale)

=== Arkansas ===
- Arkansas 4-H Center (Little Rock)
- Arkansas Union (Fayetteville)
- Arlington Hotel (Hot Springs)
- Bank OZK Arena (Hot Springs)
- Benton Event Center
- Brewer Hegeman Conference Center (Conway)
- Brinkley Convention Center
- Donald W. Reynolds Campus and Community Center (Magnolia)
- Fayetteville Town Center
- First National Bank Arena (Jonesboro)
- Fort Smith Convention Center
- Heifer Ranch Conference & Retreat Center (Perryville)
- Jacksonville Community Center
- L.E. "Gene" Durand Convention Center at Crockett Tower (Harrison)
- Northwest Arkansas Convention Center (Springdale)
- Ozark Conference Center (Solgohachia)
- Pine Bluff Convention Center (Pine Bluff)
- Statehouse Convention Center (Little Rock)
- Winthrop Rockefeller Institute (Morrilton)

=== California ===
- 160th Regiment State Armory (Los Angeles)
- Alameda County Fairgrounds (Pleasanton)
- Anaheim Convention Center
- Bill Graham Civic Auditorium (San Francisco)
- Bren Events Center (Irvine)
- Business Expo Center (Anaheim)
- Carson Community Center
- Centennial Hall Convention Center (Hayward)
- Cow Palace (Daly City)
- Del Mar Fairgrounds
- El Dorado County Fair (Placerville)
- Eureka Municipal Auditorium
- Fresno Convention Center
- Granlibakken (Tahoe City)
- Kaiser Convention Center (Oakland)
- Long Beach Convention and Entertainment Center
- Los Angeles Convention Center
- McEnery Convention Center (San Jose)
- Monterey Conference Center
- Moscone Center (San Francisco)
- Oakland Convention Center
- Ontario Convention Center
- Palm Springs Convention Center
- Pasadena Civic Auditorium
- Paso Robles Event Center
- Rabobank Theater and Convention Center (Bakersfield)
- Riverside Convention Center
- Sacramento Convention Center
- San Diego Convention Center
- Santa Clara Convention Center
- Santa Monica Civic Auditorium
- Shrine Auditorium (Los Angeles)
- Town & Country Convention Center (San Diego)
- Visalia Convention Center

=== Colorado ===
- Colorado Convention Center (Denver)
- Island Grove (Greeley)

=== Connecticut ===
- Bristol Event Center (Bristol)
- Connecticut Convention Center (Hartford)
- Foxwoods Rainmaker Expo Center (Ledyard)
- Mohegan Sun Earth Expo & Convention Center (Uncasville)
- PeoplesBank Arena (Hartford)

=== Delaware ===
- Chase Center on the Riverfront (Wilmington)

=== District of Columbia ===
- Ronald Reagan Building and International Trade Center
- Walter E. Washington Convention Center

=== Florida ===
- Bradenton Area Convention Center (Palmetto)
- Broward County Convention Center (Fort Lauderdale)
- Coronado Springs Convention Center (Kissimmee)
- Disney's Grand Floridian Convention Center (Kissimmee)
- Disney's Yacht Club Convention Center (Lake Buena Vista)
- Clemente Center (Melbourne)
- Donald L. Tucker Center (Tallahassee)
- Gaylord Palms Resort & Convention Center (Kissimmee)
- Emerald Coast Convention Center (Okaloosa Island/Destin)
- Miami-Dade County Fairgrounds & Expo Center (Miami, Florida)
- FTL War Memorial (Fort Lauderdale)
- Knight International Center (Miami)
- Lake Wimauma Convention Center (Wimauma)
- Miami Airport Convention Center (Miami)
- Miami Beach Convention Center (Miami)
- MidFlorida Credit Union Event Center (Port St. Lucie)
- Ocean Center (Daytona Beach)
- Orange County Convention Center (Orlando)
- Orlando World Center Marriott (Orlando)
- Palm Beach County Convention Center (West Palm Beach)
- Prime F. Osborn III Convention Center (Jacksonville)
- RP Funding Center (Lakeland)
- Space Coast Convention Center (Cocoa)
- Tampa Convention Center (Tampa)
- Volusia County Fair and Expo Center (DeLand)

=== Georgia ===
- Atlanta Exposition Centers
- Classic Center (Athens)
- Cobb Galleria Centre (Atlanta)
- Gas South Arena (Duluth)
- Georgia International Convention Center (College Park)
- Georgia World Congress Center (Atlanta)
- James Brown Arena (Augusta)
- Macon City Auditorium (Macon)
- Savannah International Trade and Convention Center (Savannah)

=== Hawaii ===
- Hawai'i Convention Center (Honolulu)

=== Idaho ===
- Boise Centre
- Idaho Center (Nampa)

=== Illinois ===
- Bank of Springfield Center (Springfield)
- Donald E. Stephens Convention Center (Rosemont)
- McCormick Place (Chicago)
- Oakley-Lindsay Center (Quincy)
- Odeum Expo Center (demolished) (Villa Park)
- Peoria Civic Center
- Progress City USA (Decatur)
- Renaissance Schaumburg Convention Center Hotel
- Tinley Park Convention Center
- Vibrant Arena at The MARK (Moline)
- Gateway Convention Center (Collinsville)

=== Indiana ===
- Allen County War Memorial Coliseum & Expo Center (Fort Wayne)
- Century Center (South Bend)
- Genesis Convention Center (Gary)
- Grand Wayne Convention Center (Fort Wayne)
- Honeywell Center (Wabash)
- Horizon Convention Center (Muncie)
- Indiana Convention Center (Indianapolis)
- Indiana State Fairgrounds & Event Center (Indianapolis)
- Monroe Convention Center (Bloomington)
- Old National Events Plaza (Evansville)
- Terre Haute Convention Center

=== Iowa ===
- Alliant Energy PowerHouse (Cedar Rapids)
- Grand River Event Center (Dubuque)
- Iowa Events Center (Des Moines)
- Mid-America Center (Council Bluffs)
- Quad Cities Waterfront Convention Center (Bettendorf)
- RiverCenter (Davenport)

=== Kansas ===
- Century II Convention Hall (Wichita)
- Overland Park Convention Center

=== Kentucky ===
- Center for Rural Development (Somerset)
- Central Bank Center (Lexington)
- Eastern Kentucky Exposition Center (Pikeville)
- Frankfort Convention Center
- Kentucky Exposition Center (Louisville)
- Kentucky International Convention Center (Louisville)
- Northern Kentucky Convention Center (Covington)
- Valor Hall Conference & Event Center (Oak Grove)

=== Louisiana ===
- Alario Center (Westwego)
- Blackham Coliseum (Lafayette)
- Bossier Civic Center (Bossier City)
- Burton Coliseum (Lake Charles)
- Cajundome (Lafayette)
- Frederick J. Sigur Civic Center (Chalmette)
- Houma Terrebonne Civic Center (Houma)
- Ike Hamilton Expo Center (West Monroe)
- Lake Charles Civic Center
- Lamar Dixon Expo Center (Gonzales)
- Mercedes-Benz Superdome (New Orleans)
- Municipal Auditorium (New Orleans)
- Natchitoches Events Center
- New Orleans Morial Convention Center
- Pontchartrain Center (Kenner)
- Raising Cane's River Center (Baton Rouge)
- Rapides Parish Coliseum (Alexandria)
- Shreveport Convention Center
- Smoothie King Center (New Orleans)
- Thomas Assembly Center (Ruston)
- University Center (Hammond)
- Vidalia Convention Center (Vidalia)
- Warren J. Harang Jr. Municipal Auditorium (Thibodaux)

=== Maine ===
- Cross Insurance Center (Bangor)
- Portland Exposition Building

=== Maryland ===
- Aspen Institute Wye River Conference Centers (Queenstown)
- Baltimore Convention Center
- Belmont Estate (Belmont Conference Center) (Moore's Morning Choice) (Elkridge)
- Gaylord National Resort & Convention Center (National Harbor)
- Roland E. Powell Convention Center (Ocean City)
- UMUC Inn & Conference Center (Adelphi)

=== Massachusetts ===
- Bayside Expo Center (Boston) – sold in 2010 to the University of Massachusetts Boston for future redevelopment
- Boston Convention and Exhibition Center (Boston)
- DCU Center (Worcester)
- Hynes Convention Center (Boston)
- Massachusetts Convention Center Authority
- MassMutual Center (Springfield)

=== Michigan ===
- Blue Water Convention Center (Port Huron)
- Causeway Bay Lansing Hotel & Convention Center (Lansing)
- Detroit Masonic Temple (Detroit)
- DeltaPlex Arena (demolished) (Grand Rapids)
- DeVos Place Convention Center (Grand Rapids)
- Dort Financial Center (Flint)
- Dow Event Center (Saginaw)
- Eagle Crest Resort (Ypsilanti)
- First Merchants Bank Expo Center (Monroe)
- Frankenmuth Credit Union Event Center (closed) (Birch Run)
- Grand Traverse Resort (Traverse City)
- Huntington Place (Detroit)
- Kalamazoo County Expo Center (Kalamazoo)
- Kellogg Arena (Battle Creek)
- Lansing Center (Lansing)
- Macomb Sports & Expo Center (Warren)
- Michigan Farm Bureau Pavilion (Lansing)
- Novi Expo Center (demolished) (Novi)
- Oakland Expo Center (Waterford)
- Okemos Event Center (Okemos)
- Ryder Center (University Center)
- Suburban Collection Showplace (Novi)
- Summit at the Capital Centre (closed) (Dimondale)
- Superior Dome (Marquette)
- VanDyk Mortgage Convention Center (Muskegon)
- Wexford County Civic Center (Haring)
- Wings Event Center (Kalamazoo)

=== Minnesota ===
- Duluth Entertainment Convention Center (DECC) (Duluth)
- Mayo Civic Center (Rochester)
- Mayo Clinic Health System Event Center (Mankato)
- Minneapolis Convention Center (Minneapolis)
- Minnesota State Fairgrounds (Falcon Heights)
- New Ulm Conference Center (New Ulm)
- RiverCentre (Saint Paul)
- River's Edge Convention Center (Saint Cloud)
- Mystic Lake Center (Shakopee, Minnesota)

=== Mississippi ===
- Hattiesburg Lake Terrace Convention Center
- Jackson Convention Complex

=== Missouri ===
- America's Center (St. Louis)
- Branson Convention Center (Branson)
- Chateau on the Lake Resort Spa and Convention Center (Branson)
- Glendalough Convention Center (Springfield)
- Kansas City Convention Center (Kansas City)
- Oasis Convention Center (Springfield)
- Springfield Expo Center (Springfield)
- St. Charles Convention Center (St. Charles)

=== Nebraska ===
- CHI Health Center Omaha (Omaha)
- Heartland Events Center (Grand Island)
- River's Edge Convention Center (Columbus)
- Sandhills Global Event Center (Lincoln)

=== Nevada ===
- Aria Resort and Casino (Paradise)
- Caesars Forum (Paradise)
- Cashman Center (Paradise)
- The Cosmopolitan of Las Vegas (Paradise)
- Planet Hollywood Resort and Casino (Paradise)
- Rio Hotel and Casino (Paradise)
- Palms Casino Resort (Paradise)
- Green Valley Ranch Resort Spa and Casino (Henderson)
- The M Resort and Spa (Henderson)
- Eureka Opera House (Eureka)
- JW Marriott Convention Center (Summerlin)
- Las Vegas Convention Center (Winchester)
- Mandalay Bay Convention Center (Paradise)
- MGM Grand Las Vegas (Paradise)
- Horseshoe Las Vegas (Paradise)
- Reno-Sparks Convention Center (Reno)
- Venetian Expo (Paradise)
- Westgate Las Vegas (Winchester)
- Wynn Las Vegas (Paradise)

=== New Jersey ===
- Atlantic City Convention Center (Atlantic City)
- Historic Atlantic City Convention Hall (frequently called Boardwalk Hall) (Atlantic City)
- Garden State Convention Center (closed) (Somerset)
- Meadowlands Exposition Center (Secaucus)
- New Jersey Convention and Exposition Center (Edison)
- Wildwoods Convention Center (Wildwood)

=== New Mexico ===
- Albuquerque Convention Center
- Santa Fe Community Convention Center

=== New York ===
- Albany Capital Center (Albany)
- Brooklyn Expo Center (Brooklyn, New York City)
- Buffalo Convention Center (Buffalo)
- The Dome Center (Henrietta)
- Empire Expo Center (Syracuse)
- Jacob K. Javits Convention Center (Manhattan, New York City)
- Joseph A. Floreano Rochester Riverside Convention Center (Rochester)
- Madison Square Garden (Manhattan, New York City)
- Madison Square Garden (1890) (demolished) (Manhattan, New York City)
- Madison Square Garden (1925) (demolished) (Manhattan, New York City)
- Nassau Veterans Memorial Coliseum (Uniondale)
- New York Coliseum (demolished) (Manhattan, New York City)
- New York Expo Center (Bronx, New York City)
- Niagara Falls Convention Center (Niagara Falls)
- Oncenter (Syracuse)
- Saratoga Springs City Center (Saratoga Springs)
- Westchester County Center (White Plains)

=== North Carolina ===
- Charlotte Convention Center
- Durham Convention Center
- Greensboro Coliseum Complex (Greensboro)
- The Empire Room (Greensboro)
- Joseph S. Koury Convention Center (Greensboro)
- M. C. Benton Convention Center (Winston-Salem)
- Raleigh Convention Center
- Wilmington Convention Center

=== Ohio ===
- Dayton Convention Center (Dayton)
- First Financial Center (Cincinnati)
- Greater Columbus Convention Center (Columbus)
- Huntington Convention Center of Cleveland and Global Center for Health Innovation (Cleveland)
- International Exposition (I-X) Center (Cleveland)
- John S. Knight Center (Akron)
- Kalahari Resort and Convention Center Sandusky (Sandusky)
- SeaGate Centre (Toledo)
- Sharonville Convention Center (Sharonville)

=== Oklahoma ===
- Arvest Convention Center (formerly Tulsa Convention Center and Cox Business Center) (Tulsa)
- Oklahoma City Convention Center (Oklahoma City)
- SageNet Center (Tulsa)

=== Oregon ===
- Portland Expo Center
- Oregon Convention Center (Portland)
- Seaside Civic and Convention Center
- Salem Convention Center

=== Pennsylvania ===
- 2300 Arena (Philadelphia
- Bayfront Convention Center (Erie)
- Blair County Convention Center (Altoona)
- Carlisle Expo Center
- David L. Lawrence Convention Center (Pittsburgh)
- Frank J. Pasquerilla Conference Center (Johnstown)
- Greater Philadelphia Expo Center (Oaks)
- Greater Reading Expo Center (closed)
- Hershey Lodge and Convention Center
- Kalahari Resort and Convention Center Poconos (Pocono Manor)
- Lancaster County Convention Center (Lancaster)
- Pennsylvania Convention Center (Philadelphia)
- Pennsylvania Farm Show Complex & Expo Center (Harrisburg)
- Utz Arena (York)

=== Rhode Island ===
- Rhode Island Convention Center (Providence)

=== South Carolina ===
- Greenville Convention Center
- Charleston Area Convention Center
- Columbia Metropolitan Convention Center
- Myrtle Beach Convention Center
- Spartanburg Expo & Event Center

=== South Dakota ===
- The Denny Sanford PREMIER Center and Sioux Falls Convention Center - Sioux Falls, SD
- The Box - Rapid City, SD

=== Tennessee ===
- Gatlinburg Convention Center
- Gaylord Opryland Resort & Convention Center (Nashville)
- Chattanooga Convention Center
- Knoxville Convention Center
- Memphis Cook Convention Center
- Music City Center (Nashville)

=== Texas ===
- American Bank Center (Corpus Christi)
- Amarillo Civic Center (Amarillo
- Arlington Convention Center (Arlington)
- Austin Convention Center (Austin)
- Beaumont Civic Center (Beaumont)
- Curtis Culwell Center (Garland)
- Esports Stadium Arlington (Arlington)
- Ford Arena (Beaumont)
- Fort Worth Convention Center (Fort Worth)
- Freeman Coliseum (San Antonio)
- George R. Brown Convention Center (Houston)
- Henderson Exposition Center (Lufkin)
- Henry B. Gonzalez Convention Center (San Antonio)
- Irving Convention Center at Las Colinas (Iriving)
- Kalahari Resort and Convention Center Round Rock (Round Rock)
- Kay Bailey Hutchison Convention Center (Dallas)
- Lone Star Convention & Expo Center (Conroe)
- Lubbock Memorial Civic Center (Lubbock)
- Kay Yeager Coliseum (Wichita Falls)
- Killeen Civic and Conference Center
- Merrell Center (Katy)
- McAllen Convention Center
- Montagne Center (Beaumont)
- NRG Center (Houston)
- Pitser Garrison Convention Center (Lufkin)
- South Padre Island Convention Centre (South Padre Island)
- The Oil Palace (Tyler)
- Waco Convention Center (Waco)
- Williams Convention Center (El Paso)

=== Utah ===
- David Eccles Conference Center (Ogden)
- Davis Conference Center (Layton)
- Dixie Center (St. George)
- Golden Spike Arena (Ogden)
- Mountain America Expo Center (Sandy)
- Salt Palace (Salt Lake City)
- Utah Valley Convention Center (Provo)

=== Virginia ===
- Berglund Center
- Chesapeake Conference Center
- Fredericksburg Expo & Conference Center
- Greater Richmond Convention Center
- Hampton Roads Convention Center
- The National Conference Center (Lansdowne)
- Salem Civic Center
- Virginia Beach Convention Center

=== Washington ===
- Greater Tacoma Convention Center (Tacoma)
- Lumen Field Events Center (Seattle)
- Lynnwood Event Center (Lynnwood)
- Meydenbauer Center (Bellevue)
- Spokane Convention Center (Spokane)
- Three Rivers Convention Center (Tri-Cities)
- Tacoma Dome (Tacoma)
- Seattle Convention Center (Seattle)
- Wenatchee Convention Center (Wenatchee)
- Yakima Convention Center (Yakima)

=== West Virginia ===
- Beckley-Raleigh County Convention Center (Beckley)
- Big Sandy Superstore Arena (Huntington)
- Charleston Coliseum & Convention Center (Charleston)
- Morgantown Event Center

=== Wisconsin ===
- Alliant Energy Center (Madison)
- Baird Center (Milwaukee)
- Fox Cities Exhibition Center (Appleton)
- Kalahari Resort and Convention Center Wisconsin Dells (Baraboo)
- Monona Terrace (Madison)
- Resch Expo (Ashwaubenon)
- Shopko Hall (closed) (Ashwaubenon)
- Waukesha County Expo Center (Waukesha)
- Wisconsin Exposition Center (West Allis)

=== Wyoming ===
- Headwaters Arts and Conference Center (Dubois)

== By size ==
Convention centers are sorted by gross facility square footage and then by gross exhibit hall square footage.

Name	Location City	State	Exhibition space	Total space
McCormick Place	Chicago	Illinois	2,670,000 sq ft (248,000 m^{2})	9,000,000 sq ft (840,000 m^{2})
Orange County Convention Center	Orlando	Florida	2,100,000 sq ft (200,000 m^{2}).	7,000,000 sq ft (650,000 m^{2})
Las Vegas Convention Center	Las Vegas	Nevada	2,500,000 sq ft (230,000 m^{2})	4,600,000 sq ft (430,000 m^{2})
Georgia World Congress Center	Atlanta	Georgia	1,500,000 sq ft (140,000 m^{2})	3,900,000 sq ft (360,000 m^{2})
Jacob K. Javits Convention Center	New York City	New York	850,000 sq ft (79,000 m^{2})	3,300,000 sq ft (310,000 m^{2})
New Orleans Morial Convention Center	New Orleans	Louisiana	1,100,000 sq ft (100,000 m^{2})	3,100,000 sq ft (290,000 m^{2})
America's Center	St. Louis	Missouri	523,000 sq ft (48,600 m^{2})	2,700,000 sq ft (250,000 m^{2})
San Diego Convention Center	San Diego	California	615,700 sq ft (57,200 m^{2})	2,600,000 sq ft (240,000 m^{2})
Huntington Place	Detroit	Michigan	723,500 sq ft (67,220 m^{2})	2,400,000 sq ft (220,000 m^{2})
Walter E. Washington Convention Center	Washington	District of Columbia	703,000 sq ft (65,300 m^{2})	2,300,000 sq ft (210,000 m^{2})
Venetian Expo	Las Vegas	Nevada	936,600 sq ft (87,010 m^{2})	2,250,000 sq ft (209,000 m^{2})
International Exposition Center (I-X Center)	Cleveland	Ohio	1,000,000 sq ft (93,000 m^{2})	2,200,000 sq ft (200,000 m^{2})
Colorado Convention Center	Denver	Colorado	584,000 sq ft (54,300 m^{2})	2,200,000 sq ft (200,000 m^{2})
Mandalay Bay Convention Center	Las Vegas	Nevada	861,231 sq ft (80,011.0 m^{2})	2,100,000 sq ft (200,000 m^{2})
Music City Center	Nashville	Tennessee	350,000 sq ft (33,000 m^{2})	2,100,000 sq ft (200,000 m^{2})
Kay Bailey Hutchison Convention Center	Dallas	Texas	1,000,000 sq ft (93,000 m^{2})	2,000,000 sq ft (190,000 m^{2})
Pennsylvania Convention Center	Philadelphia	Pennsylvania	1,000,000 sq ft (93,000 m^{2})	2,000,000 sq ft (190,000 m^{2})
Moscone Convention Center	San Francisco	California	700,000 sq ft (65,000 m^{2})	2,000,000 sq ft (190,000 m^{2})
George R. Brown Convention Center	Houston	Texas	853,000 sq ft (79,200 m^{2})	1,800,000 sq ft (170,000 m^{2})
Greater Columbus Convention Center	Columbus	Ohio	447,000 sq ft (41,500 m^{2})	1,800,000 sq ft (170,000 m^{2})
Anaheim Convention Center	Anaheim	California	815,000 sq ft (75,700 m^{2})	1,600,000 sq ft (150,000 m^{2})
Henry B. Gonzalez Convention Center	San Antonio	Texas	514,000 sq ft (47,800 m^{2})	1,500,000 sq ft (140,000 m^{2})
David L. Lawrence Convention Center	Pittsburgh	Pennsylvania	330,000 sq ft (31,000 m^{2})	1,450,000 sq ft (135,000 m^{2})
NRG Center	Houston	Texas	706,000 sq ft (65,600 m^{2})	1,400,000 sq ft (130,000 m^{2})
Indiana Convention Center	Indianapolis	Indiana	566,600 sq ft (52,640 m^{2})	1,300,000 sq ft (120,000 m^{2})
Baltimore Convention Center	Baltimore	Maryland	425,000 sq ft (39,500 m^{2})	1,225,000 sq ft (113,800 m^{2})
Kentucky Exposition Center	Louisville	Kentucky		1,200,000 sq ft (110,000 m^{2})
CenturyLink Center Omaha	Omaha	Nebraska	194,000 sq ft (18,000 m^{2})	1,100,000 sq ft (100,000 m^{2})
Hawaii Convention Center	Honolulu	Hawaii		1,100,000 sq ft (100,000 m^{2})
World Equestrian Center	Ocala	Florida	1,026,500 sq ft (95,360 m^{2})	1,036,100 sq ft (96,260 m^{2})
Cleveland Convention Center and Global Center for Health Innovation	Cleveland	Ohio	767,000 sq ft (71,300 m^{2})	1,002,000 sq ft (93,100 m^{2})
Donald E. Stephens Convention Center	Rosemont	Illinois	840,000 sq ft (78,000 m^{2})	1,000,000 sq ft (93,000 m^{2})
Miami Beach Convention Center	Miami Beach	Florida	502,000 sq ft (46,600 m^{2})	1,000,000 sq ft (93,000 m^{2})
Atlantic City Convention Center	Atlantic City	New Jersey	500,000 sq ft (46,000 m^{2})	1,000,000 sq ft (93,000 m^{2})
Oregon Convention Center	Portland	Oregon	255,000 sq ft (23,700 m^{2})	1,000,000 sq ft (93,000 m^{2})
Seattle Convention Center	Seattle	Washington	485,150 sq ft (45,072 m^{2})	988,422 sq ft (91,827.4 m^{2})
Boston Convention and Exhibition Center	Boston	Massachusetts	516,000 sq ft (47,900 m^{2})	976,000 sq ft (90,700 m^{2})
Phoenix Convention Center	Phoenix	Arizona	312,000 sq ft (29,000 m^{2})	900,000 sq ft (84,000 m^{2})
Austin Convention Center	Austin	Texas	246,092 sq ft (22,862.7 m^{2})	881,400 sq ft (81,880 m^{2})
Los Angeles Convention Center	Los Angeles	California	720,000 sq ft (67,000 m^{2})	867,000 sq ft (80,500 m^{2})
Charlotte Convention Center	Charlotte	North Carolina	280,000 sq ft (26,000 m^{2})	850,000 sq ft (79,000 m^{2})
Bartle Hall Convention Center	Kansas City	Missouri	388,000 sq ft (36,000 m^{2})	800,000 sq ft (74,000 m^{2})
Georgia National Fairgrounds and Agricenter	Perry	Georgia	738,204 sq ft (68,581.4 m^{2})	781,831 sq ft (72,634.5 m^{2})
Fair Park	Dallas	Texas		749,000 sq ft (69,600 m^{2})
Salt Palace Convention Center	Salt Lake City	Utah	515,000 sq ft (47,800 m^{2})	679,000 sq ft (63,100 m^{2})
Greensboro Coliseum Complex	Greensboro	North Carolina	200,988 sq ft (18,672.4 m^{2})	647,000 sq ft (60,100 m^{2})
Pennsylvania Farm Show Complex and Expo Center	Harrisburg	Pennsylvania	593,872 sq ft (55,172.5 m^{2})	634,507 sq ft (58,947.6 m^{2})
Broward County Convention Center	Ft. Lauderdale	Florida	350,000 sq ft (33,000 m^{2})	600,000 sq ft (56,000 m^{2})
Tampa Convention Center	Tampa	Florida	200,000 sq ft	600,000 sq ft (56,000 m^{2})
Long Beach Convention and Entertainment Center	Long Beach	California	299,000 sq ft (27,800 m^{2})	572,387 sq ft (53,176.5 m^{2})
Expo Square	Tulsa	Oklahoma		570,508 sq ft (53,001.9 m^{2})
San Jose Convention Center	San Jose	California	165,000 sq ft (15,300 m^{2})	550,000 sq ft (51,000 m^{2})
Gaylord National Resort and Convention Center	National Harbor	Maryland	151,161 sq ft (14,043.3 m^{2})	546,889 sq ft (50,807.7 m^{2})
Alliant Energy Center	Madison	Wisconsin	495,000 sq ft (46,000 m^{2})	522,900 sq ft (48,580 m^{2})
Mississippi State Fair grounds	Jackson	Mississippi	458,449 sq ft (42,591.3 m^{2})	505,449 sq ft (46,957.7 m^{2})
Raleigh Convention Center	Raleigh	North Carolina	150,000 sq ft (14,000 m^{2})	500,000 sq ft (46,000 m^{2})
Gaylord Texan Resort & Convention Center	Grapevine	Texas	179,520 sq ft (16,678 m^{2})	490,132 sq ft (45,534.8 m^{2})
Gaylord Pacific Resort & Convention Center	Chula Vista	California	140,049 sq ft (13,011.0 m^{2})	488,014 sq ft (45,338.0 m^{2})
Gaylord Palms Resort & Convention Center	Kissimmee	Florida	178,500 sq ft (16,580 m^{2})	482,745 sq ft (44,848.5 m^{2})
Suburban Collection Showplace	Novi	Michigan	305,000 sq ft (28,300 m^{2})	460,000 sq ft (43,000 m^{2})
Hynes Convention Center	Boston	Massachusetts	176,480 sq ft (16,396 m^{2})	427,800 sq ft (39,740 m^{2})
Savannah International Trade and Convention Center	Savannah	Georgia	193,820 sq ft (18,006 m^{2})	403,341 sq ft (37,471.6 m^{2})
Spokane Convention Center	Spokane	Washington	120,000 sq ft (11,000 m^{2})	390,000 sq ft (36,000 m^{2})
Lancaster Event Center	Lincoln	Nebraska	358,453 sq ft (33,301.4 m^{2})	387,153 sq ft (35,967.7 m^{2})
Reno-Sparks Convention Center	Reno	Nevada	381,000 sq ft (35,400 m^{2})	
Duke Energy Convention Center	Cincinnati	Ohio	195,320 sq ft (18,146 m^{2})	366,200 sq ft (34,020 m^{2})
Spooky Nook Champion Mill	Hamilton	Ohio	330,000 sq ft (31,000 m^{2})	365,000 sq ft (33,900 m^{2})
Illinois State Fairgrounds	Springfield	Illinois	334,406 sq ft (31,067.3 m^{2})	358,882 sq ft (33,341.2 m^{2})
Eastern States Exposition Complex	West Springfield	Massachusetts		355,400 sq ft (33,020 m^{2})
Fairplex	Pomona	California	312,820 sq ft (29,062 m^{2})	342,820 sq ft (31,849 m^{2})
Brazos County Expo	Bryan	Texas	293,000 sq ft (27,200 m^{2})	341,000 sq ft (31,700 m^{2})
Greenville Convention Center	Greenville	South Carolina	280,000 sq ft (26,000 m^{2})	340,000 sq ft (32,000 m^{2})
Portland Expo Center	Portland	Oregon	324,000 sq ft (30,100 m^{2})	339,433 sq ft (31,534.4 m^{2})
Birmingham Jefferson Convention Complex	Birmingham	Alabama	220,000 sq ft (20,000 m^{2})	320,000 sq ft (30,000 m^{2})
Mississippi Coast Coliseum and Convention Center	Biloxi	Mississippi	158,112 sq ft (14,689.1 m^{2})	314,221 sq ft (29,192.1 m^{2})
Amarillo National Center/Tri-State Expo Center	Amarillo	Texas	219,150 sq ft (20,360 m^{2})	311,180 sq ft (28,910 m^{2})
SAFE Credit Union Convention Center	Sacramento	California	159,709 sq ft (14,837.5 m^{2})	308,952 sq ft (28,702.6 m^{2})
Georgia International Convention Center	College Park	Georgia	150,000 sq ft (14,000 m^{2})	295,000 sq ft (27,400 m^{2})
Albuquerque Convention Center	Albuquerque	New Mexico	166,543 sq ft (15,472.4 m^{2})	280,837 sq ft (26,090.6 m^{2})
Iowa Events Center	Des Moines	Iowa	150,000 sq ft (14,000 m^{2})	280,132 sq ft (26,025.1 m^{2})
Earth Expo and Sky Convention Centers	Uncasville	Connecticut	125,000 sq ft (11,600 m^{2})	275,000 sq ft (25,500 m^{2})
Tony Nelssen Equestrian Center	Scottsdale	Arizona		274,000 sq ft (25,500 m^{2})
RiverCentre/Roy Wilkins Auditorium/Xcel Energy Center	St. Paul	Minnesota	159,800 sq ft (14,850 m^{2})	266,290 sq ft (24,739 m^{2})
Prime F. Osborn III Convention Center	Jacksonville	Florida		265,000 sq ft (24,600 m^{2})
Greater Richmond Convention Center	Richmond	Virginia	178,158 sq ft (16,551.4 m^{2})	258,708 sq ft (24,034.8 m^{2})
Mountain America Exposition Center	Sandy	Utah	243,000 sq ft (22,600 m^{2})	258,000 sq ft (24,000 m^{2})
Del Mar Fairgrounds	Del Mar	California	232,050 sq ft (21,558 m^{2})	252,050 sq ft (23,416 m^{2})
Arlington Convention Center/Live! by Loews	Arlington	Texas		251,000 sq ft (23,300 m^{2})
Cow Palace	Daly City	California	170,254 sq ft (15,817.1 m^{2})	250,000 sq ft (23,000 m^{2})
Navy Pier	Chicago	Illinois	170,100 sq ft (15,800 m^{2})	250,000 sq ft (23,000 m^{2})
Renasant Convention Center	Memphis	Tennessee	125,000 sq ft (11,600 m^{2})	249,623 sq ft (23,190.7 m^{2})
Burton Complex	Lake Charles	Louisiana	235,000 sq ft (21,800 m^{2})	243,000 sq ft (22,600 m^{2})
National Sports Center	Blaine	Minnesota	224,000 sq ft (20,800 m^{2})	242,340 sq ft (22,514 m^{2})
Freeman Coliseum/Frost Bank Center	San Antonio	Texas	214,216 sq ft (19,901.3 m^{2})	241,966 sq ft (22,479.4 m^{2})
Maryland State Fairgrounds	Timonium	Maryland	215,550 sq ft (20,025 m^{2})	240,020 sq ft (22,299 m^{2})
Greater Philadelphia Expo Center	Oaks	Pennsylvania		240,000 sq ft (22,000 m^{2})
Century II Convention and Performing Arts Center	Wichita	Kansas	198,800 sq ft (18,470 m^{2})	238,080 sq ft (22,118 m^{2})
Mobile Convention Center	Mobile	Alabama	100,000 sq ft (9,300 m^{2})	234,106 sq ft (21,749.2 m^{2})
Arizona State Fairgrounds	Phoenix	Arizona	213,080 sq ft (19,796 m^{2})	232,424 sq ft (21,592.9 m^{2})
Lone Star Convention Center	Conroe	Texas	156,000 sq ft (14,500 m^{2})	228,100 sq ft (21,190 m^{2})
Baird Center	Milwaukee	Wisconsin	188,695 sq ft (17,530.3 m^{2})	226,201 sq ft (21,014.8 m^{2})
International Agri-Center	Tulare	California	193,300 sq ft (17,960 m^{2})	221,966 sq ft (20,621.3 m^{2})
Statehouse Convention Center	Little Rock	Arkansas	82,892 sq ft (7,700.9 m^{2})	220,000 sq ft (20,000 m^{2})
Tucson Convention Center	Tucson	Arizona	133,840 sq ft (12,434 m^{2})	218,821 sq ft (20,329.1 m^{2})
Cobb Galleria Centre	Cumberland	Georgia	144,000 sq ft (13,400 m^{2})	218,500 sq ft (20,300 m^{2})
Devos Place Convention Center	Grand Rapids	Michigan	162,000 sq ft (15,100 m^{2})	217,643 sq ft (20,219.7 m^{2})
Montana Expo Park	Great Falls	Montana	179,280 sq ft (16,656 m^{2})	210,279 sq ft (19,535.6 m^{2})
Virginia Beach Convention Center	Virginia Beach	Virginia	150,012 sq ft (13,936.6 m^{2})	210,264 sq ft (19,534.2 m^{2})
Deschutes County Expo Center	Redmond	Oregon	175,934 sq ft (16,344.8 m^{2})	209,670 sq ft (19,479 m^{2})
Glass City Center/Huntington Center	Toledo	Ohio	95,400 sq ft (8,860 m^{2})	205,128 sq ft (19,057.0 m^{2})
American Bank Center	Corpus Christi	Texas	100,500 sq ft (9,340 m^{2})	202,331 sq ft (18,797.2 m^{2})
Duluth Entertainment and Convention Center and Amsoil Arena	Duluth	Minnesota	106,832 sq ft (9,925.0 m^{2})	202,194 sq ft (18,784.4 m^{2})
State Farm Stadium	Glendale	Arizona	160,000 sq ft (15,000 m^{2})	200,950 sq ft (18,669 m^{2})
Bismarck Event Center	Bismarck	North Dakota	146,000 sq ft (13,600 m^{2})	200,000 sq ft (19,000 m^{2})
Broadmoor Convention Center	Colorado Springs	Colorado	92,500 sq ft (8,590 m^{2})	200,000 sq ft (19,000 m^{2})
Tucson Expo Center	Tucson	Arizona	138,987 sq ft (12,912.3 m^{2})	199,512 sq ft (18,535.3 m^{2})
Lane Events Center	Eugene	Oregon	153,980 sq ft (14,305 m^{2})	194,438 sq ft (18,063.9 m^{2})
Charleston Area Convention Center/North Charleston Coliseum	North Charleston	South Carolina	106,960 sq ft (9,937 m^{2})	192,241 sq ft (17,859.8 m^{2})
North Dakota State Fair Center/All Seasons Arena	Minot	North Dakota	135,280 sq ft (12,568 m^{2})	192,176 sq ft (17,853.7 m^{2})
Connecticut Convention Center	Hartford	Connecticut	140,000 sq ft (13,000 m^{2})	191,500 sq ft (17,790 m^{2})
Von Braun Center	Huntsville	Alabama	148,320 sq ft (13,779 m^{2})	191,320 sq ft (17,774 m^{2})
National Cattle Congress Complex	Waterloo	Iowa	157,280 sq ft (14,612 m^{2})	190,930 sq ft (17,738 m^{2})
Peoria Civic Center	Peoria	Illinois	136,068 sq ft (12,641.1 m^{2})	189,090 sq ft (17,567 m^{2})
Raising Cane's River Center	Baton Rouge	Louisiana	100,000 sq ft (9,300 m^{2})	185,220 sq ft (17,208 m^{2})
GVSU Fieldhouse	Allendale	Michigan		183,000 sq ft (17,000 m^{2})
San Mateo County Event Center	San Mateo	California	181,780 sq ft (16,888 m^{2})	182,440 sq ft (16,949 m^{2})
Roland E. Powell Convention Center	Ocean City	Maryland		182,200 sq ft (16,930 m^{2})
Columbus Convention and Trade Center	Columbus	Georgia	54,982 sq ft (5,108.0 m^{2})	182,000 sq ft (16,900 m^{2})
Resch Center and Expo	Green Bay	Wisconsin	153,563 sq ft (14,266.5 m^{2})	180,218 sq ft (16,742.8 m^{2})
Ocean Center	Daytona Beach	Florida	135,174 sq ft (12,558.1 m^{2})	179,078 sq ft (16,636.9 m^{2})
Allen County War Memorial Coliseum	Fort Wayne	Indiana	152,000 sq ft (14,100 m^{2})	179,000 sq ft (16,600 m^{2})
Fair Expo Center	Sweetwater	Florida	162,521 sq ft (15,098.7 m^{2})	178,063 sq ft (16,542.6 m^{2})
Delaware State Fairgrounds	Harrington	Delaware		177,625 sq ft (16,501.9 m^{2})
Oncenter	Syracuse	New York	143,939 sq ft (13,372.4 m^{2})	177,329 sq ft (16,474.4 m^{2})
Multipurpose Event Center	Wichita Falls	Texas		177,300 sq ft (16,470 m^{2})
Knoxville Convention Center	Knoxville	Tennessee	119,922 sq ft (11,141.1 m^{2})	173,222 sq ft (16,092.9 m^{2})
Albany Capital Center/Empire State Plaza/MVP Arena	Albany	New York	113,248 sq ft (10,521.1 m^{2})	172,798 sq ft (16,053.5 m^{2})
York Expo Center	York	Pennsylvania	161,914 sq ft (15,042.3 m^{2})	172,545 sq ft (16,030.0 m^{2})
Miami Airport Convention Center	Doral	Florida	76,360 sq ft (7,094 m^{2})	172,000 sq ft (16,000 m^{2})
Bell County Expo Center	Belton	Texas	149,000 sq ft (13,800 m^{2})	170,900 sq ft (15,880 m^{2})
Springfield Expo Center/University Plaza Convention Center	Springfield	Missouri	98,000 sq ft (9,100 m^{2})	170,000 sq ft (16,000 m^{2})
The Monument	Rapid City	South Dakota	122,702 sq ft (11,399.4 m^{2})	169,552 sq ft (15,751.9 m^{2})
Orange County Fair and Event Center	Costa Mesa	California	144,877 sq ft (13,459.5 m^{2})	168,226 sq ft (15,628.7 m^{2})
Stormont Vail Events Center	Topeka	Kansas	149,403 sq ft (13,880.0 m^{2})	167,203 sq ft (15,533.7 m^{2})
Linn County Expo Center	Albany	Oregon	159,000 sq ft (14,800 m^{2})	167,000 sq ft (15,500 m^{2})
Rhode Island Convention Center	Providence	Rhode Island	100,000 sq ft (9,300 m^{2})	167,000 sq ft (15,500 m^{2})
Doggett Ford Park	Beaumont	Texas	152,000 sq ft (14,100 m^{2})	163,000 sq ft (15,100 m^{2})
Taylor County Expo Center	Abilene	Texas	137,000 sq ft (12,700 m^{2})	163,000 sq ft (15,100 m^{2})
Benton Convention Center	Winston-Salem	North Carolina		162,600 sq ft (15,110 m^{2})
Chattanooga Convention Center	Chattanooga	Tennessee	100,800 sq ft (9,360 m^{2})	160,580 sq ft (14,918 m^{2})
Denny Sanford Premier Center/Sioux Falls Arena and Convention Center	Sioux Falls	South Dakota	100,400 sq ft (9,330 m^{2})	160,000 sq ft (15,000 m^{2})
Extraco Events Center	Waco	Texas	157,818 sq ft (14,661.8 m^{2})	158,560 sq ft (14,731 m^{2})
Alerus Center	Grand Forks	North Dakota	99,600 sq ft (9,250 m^{2})	156,188 sq ft (14,510.3 m^{2})
Fresno Convention Center	Fresno	California	125,771 sq ft (11,684.5 m^{2})	154,937 sq ft (14,394.1 m^{2})
Dena'ina Civic and Convention Center	Anchorage	Alaska	72,240 sq ft (6,711 m^{2})	154,444 sq ft (14,348.3 m^{2})
Gas South Arena and Convention Center	Duluth	Georgia	107,000 sq ft (9,900 m^{2})	153,422 sq ft (14,253.4 m^{2})
Island Grove	Greeley	Colorado	112,400 sq ft (10,440 m^{2})	151,138 sq ft (14,041.2 m^{2})
New Jersey Convention and Exhibition Center	Edison	New Jersey	135,000 sq ft (12,500 m^{2})	150,000 sq ft (14,000 m^{2})
Central Bank Center/Rupp Arena	Lexington	Kentucky	100,000 sq ft (9,300 m^{2})	150,000 sq ft (14,000 m^{2})
Mayo Civic Center	Rochester	Minnesota	66,010 sq ft (6,133 m^{2})	149,306 sq ft (13,871.0 m^{2})
Golden Spike Event Center	Ogden	Utah	100,610 sq ft (9,347 m^{2})	149,250 sq ft (13,866 m^{2})
Chisholm Trail Expo Center	Enid	Oklahoma	118,928 sq ft (11,048.8 m^{2})	148,405 sq ft (13,787.3 m^{2})
South Carolina State Fairgrounds	Columbia	South Carolina	138,136 sq ft (12,833.3 m^{2})	147,956 sq ft (13,745.6 m^{2})
Schaumburg Convention Center	Schaumburg	Illinois	97,200 sq ft (9,030 m^{2})	147,014 sq ft (13,658.0 m^{2})
Buffalo County Exposition Center/Ag Pavilion/Exhibit Building	Kearney	Nebraska	136,500 sq ft (12,680 m^{2})	146,500 sq ft (13,610 m^{2})
Salinas Valley Fairgrounds	King City	California	127,000 sq ft (11,800 m^{2})	146,000 sq ft (13,600 m^{2})
Metrapark	Billings	Montana		145,400 sq ft (13,510 m^{2})
Cabarrus Arena and Events Center	Concord	North Carolina	128,830 sq ft (11,969 m^{2})	145,260 sq ft (13,495 m^{2})
Ector County Coliseum	Odessa	Texas		145,000 sq ft (13,500 m^{2})
Palm Beach County Convention Center	West Palm Beach	Florida	100,000 sq ft (9,300 m^{2})	143,000 sq ft (13,300 m^{2})
Dutchess County Fairgrounds	Rhinebeck	New York	58,776 sq ft (5,460.5 m^{2})	141,773 sq ft (13,171.1 m^{2})
Norfolk Scope	Norfolk	Virginia	82,896 sq ft (7,701.3 m^{2})	140,000 sq ft (13,000 m^{2})
Dulles Expo and Conference Center	Chantilly	Virginia	123,845 sq ft (11,505.6 m^{2})	138,845 sq ft (12,899.1 m^{2})
Tacoma Dome	Tacoma	Washington		138,800 sq ft (12,890 m^{2})
Expo Idaho	Garden City vicinity	Idaho	111,970 sq ft (10,402 m^{2})	138,120 sq ft (12,832 m^{2})
Klamath County Event Center	Klamath Falls	Oregon	128,225 sq ft (11,912.5 m^{2})	137,425 sq ft (12,767.2 m^{2})
DCU Center	Worcester	Massachusetts	100,310 sq ft (9,319 m^{2})	136,090 sq ft (12,643 m^{2})
Santa Clara Convention Center	Santa Clara	California	90,014 sq ft (8,362.6 m^{2})	134,089 sq ft (12,457.3 m^{2})
Classic Center	Athens	Georgia	87,200 sq ft (8,100 m^{2})	133,167 sq ft (12,371.6 m^{2})
Judson F. Williams Convention Center	El Paso	Texas	80,000 sq ft (7,400 m^{2})	133,000 sq ft (12,400 m^{2})
Northwest Washington State Fair and Events Center	Lynden	Washington	95,700 sq ft (8,890 m^{2})	132,200 sq ft (12,280 m^{2})
Myrtle Beach Convention Center	Myrtle Beach	South Carolina	100,800 sq ft (9,360 m^{2})	132,041 sq ft (12,267.0 m^{2})
Oregon State Fair and Exposition Center	Salem	Oregon	114,504 sq ft (10,637.8 m^{2})	131,102 sq ft (12,179.8 m^{2})
Glazer Arena	Ithaca	New York		130,000 sq ft (12,000 m^{2})
Palm Springs Convention Center	Palm Springs	California	92,545 sq ft (8,597.7 m^{2})	128,450 sq ft (11,933 m^{2})
Fargodome	Fargo	North Dakota	100,000 sq ft (9,300 m^{2})	128,379 sq ft (11,926.8 m^{2})
Paducah-McCracken County Convention and Expo Center	Paducah	Kentucky	80,000 sq ft (7,400 m^{2})	126,360 sq ft (11,739 m^{2})
Pasadena Convention Center	Pasadena	California	72,000 sq ft (6,700 m^{2})	125,000 sq ft (11,600 m^{2})
Turning Stone Resort Casino	Verona	New York	30,000 sq ft (2,800 m^{2})	125,000 sq ft (11,600 m^{2})
Sonoma County Event Center	Santa Rosa	California	67,434 sq ft (6,264.8 m^{2})	124,162 sq ft (11,535.0 m^{2})
McGee Park	Farmington	New Mexico	78,500 sq ft (7,290 m^{2})	124,118 sq ft (11,530.9 m^{2})
Lansing Center	Lansing	Michigan	71,760 sq ft (6,667 m^{2})	124,118 sq ft (11,530.9 m^{2})
National Orange Show Events Center	San Bernardino	California	96,000 sq ft (8,900 m^{2})	124,100 sq ft (11,530 m^{2})
Western North Carolina Agricultural Center	Fletcher	North Carolina	101,550 sq ft (9,434 m^{2})	121,150 sq ft (11,255 m^{2})
Charleston Coliseum and Convention Center	Charleston	West Virginia	80,586 sq ft (7,486.7 m^{2})	120,526 sq ft (11,197.2 m^{2})
Round Valley Ensphere	Eagar	Arizona		120,000 sq ft (11,000 m^{2})
Ford Center at the Star	Frisco	Texas	98,000 sq ft (9,100 m^{2})	119,954 sq ft (11,144.1 m^{2})
Hickory Metro Convention Center	Hickory	North Carolina	97,780 sq ft (9,084 m^{2})	119,370 sq ft (11,090 m^{2})
Davenport RiverCenter/Adler Theatre	Davenport	Iowa		117,600 sq ft (10,930 m^{2})
Ontario Convention Center	Ontario	California	70,000 sq ft (6,500 m^{2})	114,000 sq ft (10,600 m^{2})
Alliant Energy PowerHouse	Cedar Rapids	Iowa	81,779 sq ft (7,597.5 m^{2})	113,521 sq ft (10,546.4 m^{2})
Erie County Fairgrounds	Hamburg	New York	90,828 sq ft (8,438.2 m^{2})	112,828 sq ft (10,482.1 m^{2})
G-P Atrium/Cross Insurance Club/Sports Illustrated Pavilion	Foxborough	Massachusetts	85,000 sq ft (7,900 m^{2})	111,200 sq ft (10,330 m^{2})
Buffalo Niagara Convention Center	Buffalo	New York	64,000 sq ft (5,900 m^{2})	110,000 sq ft (10,000 m^{2})
Great Plains Coliseum/Comanche County Fairgrounds	Lawton	Oklahoma		110,000 sq ft (10,000 m^{2})
Prudential Center	Newark	New Jersey	82,000 sq ft (7,600 m^{2})	108,100 sq ft (10,040 m^{2})
Kalahari Convention Center	Round Rock	Texas	61,976 sq ft (5,757.8 m^{2})	107,510 sq ft (9,988 m^{2})
Lubbock Memorial Civic Center	Lubbock	Texas	68,000 sq ft (6,300 m^{2})	106,334 sq ft (9,878.8 m^{2})
Crown Complex	Fayetteville	North Carolina	96,000 sq ft (8,900 m^{2})	105,000 sq ft (9,800 m^{2})
Williamson County Ag Expo Park	Franklin	Tennessee	100,000 sq ft (9,300 m^{2})	104,050 sq ft (9,667 m^{2})
Nassau Coliseum	Uniondale	New York		104,000 sq ft (9,700 m^{2})
Miller Expo Center	Essex Junction	Vermont	86,400 sq ft (8,030 m^{2})	103,470 sq ft (9,613 m^{2})
Tippecanoe County Fair and Event Center	Lafayette	Indiana	97,000 sq ft (9,000 m^{2})	102,500 sq ft (9,520 m^{2})
Midland County Fair Center	Midland	Michigan		102,000 sq ft (9,500 m^{2})
Dayton Convention Center	Dayton	Ohio	68,352 sq ft (6,350.1 m^{2})	101,263 sq ft (9,407.6 m^{2})
Marshall Health Network Arena	Huntington	West Virginia	56,304 sq ft (5,230.8 m^{2})	101,000 sq ft (9,400 m^{2})
Dixie Center	St. George	Utah	46,550 sq ft (4,325 m^{2})	100,734 sq ft (9,358.5 m^{2})
Montgomery Convention Center	Montgomery	Alabama	72,500 sq ft (6,740 m^{2})	100,611 sq ft (9,347.1 m^{2})
Oakland Convention Center	Oakland	California		100,566 sq ft (9,342.9 m^{2})
Overland Park Convention Center	Overland Park	Kansas	60,000 sq ft (5,600 m^{2})	100,045 sq ft (9,294.5 m^{2})
ICCU Dome	Pocatello	Idaho		100,000 sq ft (9,300 m^{2})
Velo Sports Center	Carson	California		100,000 sq ft (9,300 m^{2})
Century Center	South Bend	Indiana	41,640 sq ft (3,868 m^{2})	100,000 sq ft (9,300 m^{2})
Augusta Convention Center	Augusta	Georgia	40,000 sq ft (3,700 m^{2})	100,000 sq ft (9,300 m^{2})
Pechanga Resort and Casino	Temecula	California	40,000 sq ft (3,700 m^{2})	100,000 sq ft (9,300 m^{2})
Grand Park Events Center	Westfield	Indiana	88,784 sq ft (8,248.3 m^{2})	99,192 sq ft (9,215.2 m^{2})
Benton County Fair and Expo Center	Bentonville	Arkansas	97,600 sq ft (9,070 m^{2})	98,800 sq ft (9,180 m^{2})
Grant County Fairgrounds	Moses Lake	Washington	74,044 sq ft (6,878.9 m^{2})	98,744 sq ft (9,173.6 m^{2})
Grays Harbor County Fair and Events Center	Elma	Washington	60,452 sq ft (5,616.2 m^{2})	98,532 sq ft (9,153.9 m^{2})
Alameda County Fairgrounds	Pleasanton	California	62,600 sq ft (5,820 m^{2})	98,080 sq ft (9,112 m^{2})
AdventHealth Arena	Wesley Chapel	Florida	70,000 sq ft (6,500 m^{2})	98,000 sq ft (9,100 m^{2})
McAllen Convention Center	McAllen	Texas	61,482 sq ft (5,711.9 m^{2})	97,802 sq ft (9,086.1 m^{2})
Illinois Conference Center/State Farm Center	Champaign	Illinois	39,200 sq ft (3,640 m^{2})	97,500 sq ft (9,060 m^{2})
Walkup Skydome	Flagstaff	Arizona		96,000 sq ft (8,900 m^{2})
Gallatin County Fairgrounds	Bozeman	Montana	59,990 sq ft (5,573 m^{2})	95,340 sq ft (8,857 m^{2})
HAPO Center	Pasco	Washington	82,472 sq ft (7,661.9 m^{2})	95,273 sq ft (8,851.2 m^{2})
Grant County Fairgrounds	Moses Lake	Washington	62,044 sq ft (5,764.1 m^{2})	94,244 sq ft (8,755.6 m^{2})
P1FCU Kibbie Dome	Moscow	Idaho		93,550 sq ft (8,691 m^{2})
Spooky Nook Sports Complex	Manheim	Pennsylvania	76,045 sq ft (7,064.8 m^{2})	92,440 sq ft (8,588 m^{2})
Fredericksburg Convention Center	Fredericksburg	Virginia	80,000 sq ft (7,400 m^{2})	91,945 sq ft (8,542.0 m^{2})
Greenville Convention Center	Greenville	North Carolina	28,800 sq ft (2,680 m^{2})	91,000 sq ft (8,500 m^{2})
National Peanut Festival Complex	Dothan	Alabama		90,000 sq ft (8,400 m^{2})
Kalamazoo County Parks and Expo Center	Kalamazoo	Michigan	61,000 sq ft (5,700 m^{2})	90,000 sq ft (8,400 m^{2})
New York Expo Center	Bronx	New York	60,000 sq ft (5,600 m^{2})	90,000 sq ft (8,400 m^{2})
State Fair Park and Event Center/Yakima SunDome	Yakima	Washington	47,736 sq ft (4,434.8 m^{2})	88,552 sq ft (8,226.7 m^{2})
Ventura County Fairgrounds and Event Center	Ventura	California		88,215 sq ft (8,195.4 m^{2})
River's Edge Convention Center	St. Cloud	Minnesota	73,620 sq ft (6,840 m^{2})	87,536 sq ft (8,132.4 m^{2})
Lake County Fairgrounds and Event Center	Grayslake	Illinois	85,000 sq ft (7,900 m^{2})	86,620 sq ft (8,047 m^{2})
Grand Traverse Resort Convention Center	Acme Township	Michigan	30,000 sq ft (2,800 m^{2})	86,038 sq ft (7,993.2 m^{2})
La Crosse Center	La Crosse	Wisconsin	45,000 sq ft (4,200 m^{2})	85,627 sq ft (7,955.0 m^{2})
Northern Kentucky Convention Center	Covington	Kentucky	46,200 sq ft (4,290 m^{2})	84,988 sq ft (7,895.6 m^{2})
RP Funding Center	Lakeland	Florida	76,440 sq ft (7,102 m^{2})	84,745 sq ft (7,873.1 m^{2})
Prairie Event Center/Kane County Fairgrounds	St. Charles	Illinois	56,976 sq ft (5,293.2 m^{2})	84,561 sq ft (7,856.0 m^{2})
Moody Gardens Convention Center	Galveston	Texas	60,000 sq ft (5,600 m^{2})	84,280 sq ft (7,830 m^{2})
Berglund Center	Roanoke	Virginia	80,396 sq ft (7,469.0 m^{2})	83,131 sq ft (7,723.1 m^{2})
Cajundome	Lafayette	Louisiana	62,303 sq ft (5,788.1 m^{2})	82,782 sq ft (7,690.7 m^{2})
White County Fairgrounds	Searcy	Arkansas	71,780 sq ft (6,669 m^{2})	82,548 sq ft (7,669.0 m^{2})
Northeast Event Center	Columbia	Missouri		82,164 sq ft (7,633.3 m^{2})
UNT Coliseum/Gateway Center	Denton	Texas	53,985 sq ft (5,015.4 m^{2})	81,985 sq ft (7,616.7 m^{2})
Superior Dome	Marquette	Michigan		81,900 sq ft (7,610 m^{2})
MeadowView Resort and Convention Center	Kingsport	Tennessee	34,768 sq ft (3,230.1 m^{2})	81,563 sq ft (7,577.5 m^{2})
Old National Events Plaza/Ford Center	Evansville	Indiana	56,000 sq ft (5,200 m^{2})	81,500 sq ft (7,570 m^{2})
Anderson Auto Group Fieldhouse	Bullhead City	Arizona	76,000 sq ft (7,100 m^{2})	80,000 sq ft (7,400 m^{2})
Monroe Civic Center	Monroe	Louisiana	44,000 sq ft (4,100 m^{2})	80,000 sq ft (7,400 m^{2})
Dort Financial Center	Flint	Michigan	56,486 sq ft (5,247.7 m^{2})	78,405 sq ft (7,284.1 m^{2})
Forrest County Multipurpose Center	Hattiesburg	Mississippi	74,380 sq ft (6,910 m^{2})	77,740 sq ft (7,222 m^{2})
Wilkins Center	Winchester	Virginia	63,000 sq ft (5,900 m^{2})	77,000 sq ft (7,200 m^{2})
Douglas County Fair/Sullivan Events Center	Castle Rock	Colorado	62,040 sq ft (5,764 m^{2})	76,940 sq ft (7,148 m^{2})
Macomb Sports and Expo Center	Warren	Michigan	61,440 sq ft (5,708 m^{2})	75,440 sq ft (7,009 m^{2})
Tehama District Fairgrounds	Red Bluff	California	57,776 sq ft (5,367.6 m^{2})	74,877 sq ft (6,956.3 m^{2})
Fort Washington Armory	New York City	New York	65,000 sq ft (6,000 m^{2})	74,350 sq ft (6,907 m^{2})
Soldotna Regional Sports Complex and Fieldhouse	Soldotna	Alaska		74,000 sq ft (6,900 m^{2})
Seaboard Triumph Expo Center	Sioux City	Iowa	67,500 sq ft (6,270 m^{2})	72,444 sq ft (6,730.3 m^{2})
Corbin Arena and Center	Corbin	Kentucky	50,511 sq ft (4,692.6 m^{2})	72,055 sq ft (6,694.1 m^{2})
Dignity Health Arena and Convention Center	Bakersfield	California	49,450 sq ft (4,594 m^{2})	71,984 sq ft (6,687.5 m^{2})
Enumclaw Expo Center	Enumclaw	Washington	59,100 sq ft (5,490 m^{2})	71,888 sq ft (6,678.6 m^{2})
Angel of the Winds Arena	Everett	Washington	57,000 sq ft (5,300 m^{2})	71,085 sq ft (6,604.0 m^{2})
Davis Conference Center	Layton	Utah		70,000 sq ft (6,500 m^{2})
Mayo Clinic Health System Event Center	Mankato	Minnesota	60,000 sq ft (5,600 m^{2})	70,000 sq ft (6,500 m^{2})
Tinley Park Convention Center	Tinley Park	Illinois	58,000 sq ft (5,400 m^{2})	70,000 sq ft (6,500 m^{2})
Donald L. Tucker Civic Center	Tallahassee	Florida	53,900 sq ft (5,010 m^{2})	69,900 sq ft (6,490 m^{2})
Sandestin Golf and Beach Resort	Destin	Florida	39,100 sq ft (3,630 m^{2})	69,720 sq ft (6,477 m^{2})
Douglas County Fair Complex	Roseburg	Oregon	52,336 sq ft (4,862.2 m^{2})	69,411 sq ft (6,448.5 m^{2})
Rawhide Event Center	Chandler	Arizona	48,000 sq ft (4,500 m^{2})	69,060 sq ft (6,416 m^{2})
Mizner Center	Boca Raton	Florida	41,064 sq ft (3,815.0 m^{2})	68,368 sq ft (6,351.6 m^{2})
Riverside Convention Center	Riverside	California	30,000 sq ft (2,800 m^{2})	68,000 sq ft (6,300 m^{2})
Washington County Convention Center	Greenville	Mississippi	63,400 sq ft (5,890 m^{2})	67,600 sq ft (6,280 m^{2})
Addition Financial Arena/The Venue at UCF	University	Florida	64,300 sq ft (5,970 m^{2})	66,800 sq ft (6,210 m^{2})
Fort Smith Convention Center	Fort Smith	Arkansas	40,000 sq ft (3,700 m^{2})	65,740 sq ft (6,107 m^{2})
Henderson County Regional Fair Park	Athens	Texas		65,625 sq ft (6,096.8 m^{2})
Williamson County Ag Expo Park	Franklin	Tennessee		65,000 sq ft (6,000 m^{2})
Lewis and Clark Fairgrounds and Exhibit Hall	Helena	Montana	60,000 sq ft (5,600 m^{2})	65,000 sq ft (6,000 m^{2})
Lake County Fairgrounds	Lakeport	California	42,000 sq ft (3,900 m^{2})	65,000 sq ft (6,000 m^{2})
Laramie County Events Center	Cheyenne	Wyoming	49,731 sq ft (4,620.2 m^{2})	64,731 sq ft (6,013.7 m^{2})
Meadowlands Exposition Center	Secaucus	New Jersey	61,000 sq ft (5,700 m^{2})	64,578 sq ft (5,999.5 m^{2})
John S. Knight Center	Akron	Ohio	28,640 sq ft (2,661 m^{2})	63,027 sq ft (5,855.4 m^{2})
First National Bank Arena	Jonesboro	Arkansas		63,000 sq ft (5,900 m^{2})
Wilmington Convention Center	Wilmington	North Carolina	30,000 sq ft (2,800 m^{2})	62,784 sq ft (5,832.8 m^{2})
St. Charles Convention Center	St. Charles	Missouri	36,375 sq ft (3,379.3 m^{2})	60,697 sq ft (5,638.9 m^{2})
Central Wisconsin Convention and Expo Center	Rothschild	Wisconsin	25,623 sq ft (2,380.5 m^{2})	60,456 sq ft (5,616.5 m^{2})
Eldon Evans Expo Center	Twin Falls	Idaho		60,000 sq ft (5,600 m^{2})
Topsfield Fairgrounds	Topsfield	Massachusetts	46,600 sq ft (4,330 m^{2})	59,000 sq ft (5,500 m^{2})
Majestic Valley Arena	Kalispell	Montana		59,000 sq ft (5,500 m^{2})
Paso Robles Event Center	Paso Robles	California	44,711 sq ft (4,153.8 m^{2})	58,890 sq ft (5,471 m^{2})
Doubletree by Hilton Expo Center	Manchester	New Hampshire	40,800 sq ft (3,790 m^{2})	58,317 sq ft (5,417.8 m^{2})
Jekyll Island Convention Center	Jekyll Island	Georgia	45,140 sq ft (4,194 m^{2})	58,310 sq ft (5,417 m^{2})
Allentown Fairgrounds Agriplex	Allentown	Pennsylvania		58,000 sq ft (5,400 m^{2})
Suffolk Credit Union Arena	Brentwood	New York		58,000 sq ft (5,400 m^{2})
Los Angeles Equestrian Center	Burbank	California	45,000 sq ft (4,200 m^{2})	58,000 sq ft (5,400 m^{2})
Maude Cobb Convention Center/Longview Exhibit Center	Longview	Texas	52,018 sq ft (4,832.6 m^{2})	57,818 sq ft (5,371.5 m^{2})
Washtenaw Farm Council Fairgrounds	Saline	Michigan	11,021 sq ft (1,023.9 m^{2})	57,793 sq ft (5,369.1 m^{2})
Florence Center	Florence	South Carolina	28,482 sq ft (2,646.1 m^{2})	57,220 sq ft (5,316 m^{2})
Hancock County Fairgrounds	Findlay	Ohio	43,800 sq ft (4,070 m^{2})	57,170 sq ft (5,311 m^{2})
Cadence Bank Arena	Tupelo	Mississippi	32,000 sq ft (3,000 m^{2})	57,000 sq ft (5,300 m^{2})
Grand River Center	Dubuque	Iowa	30,000 sq ft (2,800 m^{2})	56,376 sq ft (5,237.5 m^{2})
Bayfront Convention Center	Erie	Pennsylvania	28,800 sq ft (2,680 m^{2})	56,300 sq ft (5,230 m^{2})
Bonvillain Civic Center	Houma	Louisiana	39,000 sq ft (3,600 m^{2})	56,000 sq ft (5,200 m^{2})
Westside Commons	Hillsboro	Oregon	39,250 sq ft (3,646 m^{2})	55,200 sq ft (5,130 m^{2})
Industry Hills Expo Center	City of Industry	California	45,000 sq ft (4,200 m^{2})	55,000 sq ft (5,100 m^{2})
Dupage Event Center	Wheaton	Illinois	21,600 sq ft (2,010 m^{2})	54,966 sq ft (5,106.5 m^{2})
Cross Insurance Center	Bangor	Maine	28,600 sq ft (2,660 m^{2})	54,753 sq ft (5,086.7 m^{2})
Inn of the Mountain Gods Convention Center	Mescalero	New Mexico	29,440 sq ft (2,735 m^{2})	54,465 sq ft (5,060.0 m^{2})
Shrine Auditorium and Expo Hall	Los Angeles	California		54,000 sq ft (5,000 m^{2})
Antelope Valley Fair and Event Center	Lancaster	California	45,943 sq ft (4,268.2 m^{2})	53,943 sq ft (5,011.5 m^{2})
Chippewa Valley Expo Center	Eau Claire	Wisconsin		53,413 sq ft (4,962.2 m^{2})
SBC Fairgrounds	Victorville	California	44,000 sq ft (4,100 m^{2})	53,000 sq ft (4,900 m^{2})
Stanley Cyclone Center	Stanley	New Mexico	40,800 sq ft (3,790 m^{2})	51,250 sq ft (4,761 m^{2})
Terranea Resort	Torrance	California	18,048 sq ft (1,676.7 m^{2})	51,110 sq ft (4,748 m^{2})
St. Lucie County Fair Equestrian and Event Center	Fort Pierce	Florida		51,000 sq ft (4,700 m^{2})
Manhattan Conference Center	Manhattan	Kansas	24,406 sq ft (2,267.4 m^{2})	50,770 sq ft (4,717 m^{2})
South Padre Island Convention Center	South Padre Island	Texas	22,500 sq ft (2,090 m^{2})	50,500 sq ft (4,690 m^{2})
Wenatchee Convention Center	Wenatchee	Washington		50,000 sq ft (4,600 m^{2})
Westchester County Center	White Plains	New York	38,800 sq ft (3,600 m^{2})	49,973 sq ft (4,642.6 m^{2})
NOW Arena	Hoffman Estates	Illinois	39,000 sq ft (3,600 m^{2})	49,785 sq ft (4,625.2 m^{2})
Florida Strawberry Festival Complex	Plant City	Florida		49,375 sq ft (4,587.1 m^{2})
Silver Dollar Fairgrounds	Chico	California	45,200 sq ft (4,200 m^{2})	49,200 sq ft (4,570 m^{2})
The Great Frederick Fairgrounds	Frederick	Maryland	11,940 sq ft (1,109 m^{2})	49,166 sq ft (4,567.7 m^{2})
John Paul Jones Arena	Charlottesville	Virginia	27,040 sq ft (2,512 m^{2})	49,062 sq ft (4,558.0 m^{2})
Gateway Convention Center	Collinsville	Illinois	39,500 sq ft (3,670 m^{2})	49,031 sq ft (4,555.1 m^{2})
Joplin Expo	Joplin	Missouri	40,000 sq ft (3,700 m^{2})	49,000 sq ft (4,600 m^{2})
Arapahoe County Fairgrounds and Event Center	Aurora	Colorado	41,745 sq ft (3,878.2 m^{2})	48,970 sq ft (4,549 m^{2})
Princeton Conference Center	Princeton	New Jersey	10,176 sq ft (945.4 m^{2})	48,921 sq ft (4,544.9 m^{2})
Augusta Civic Center	Augusta	Maine	24,576 sq ft (2,283.2 m^{2})	48,829 sq ft (4,536.4 m^{2})
Ruby Community Center	Morgantown	West Virginia		48,600 sq ft (4,520 m^{2})
Cragun's Resort Conference Center	Brainerd	Minnesota	13,915 sq ft (1,292.7 m^{2})	48,032 sq ft (4,462.3 m^{2})
Delaware County Fairgrounds	Muncie	Indiana	38,000 sq ft (3,500 m^{2})	47,732 sq ft (4,434.4 m^{2})
Caesars Virginia Events Center	Danville	Virginia	29,150 sq ft (2,708 m^{2})	47,650 sq ft (4,427 m^{2})
Jackson Fairgrounds	Jackson	Tennessee	25,000 sq ft (2,300 m^{2})	47,000 sq ft (4,400 m^{2})
Blair County Convention Center	Altoona	Pennsylvania	24,000 sq ft (2,200 m^{2})	47,000 sq ft (4,400 m^{2})
Meydenbauer Center	Bellevue	Washington	36,000 sq ft (3,300 m^{2})	46,390 sq ft (4,310 m^{2})
Horse Palace	Spring Creek	Nevada		45,000 sq ft (4,200 m^{2})
Washington County Fairgrounds	Marietta	Ohio	30,000 sq ft (2,800 m^{2})	45,300 sq ft (4,210 m^{2})
Cooper Steel Arena	Shelbyville	Tennessee		45,000 sq ft (4,200 m^{2})
The Event Center at iPlay America	Freehold	New Jersey	31,500 sq ft (2,930 m^{2})	45,000 sq ft (4,200 m^{2})
Carlson Center	Fairbanks	Alaska	34,018 sq ft (3,160.4 m^{2})	44,966 sq ft (4,177.5 m^{2})
Durham Convention Center and Armory	Durham	North Carolina	26,996 sq ft (2,508.0 m^{2})	44,918 sq ft (4,173.0 m^{2})
Hilton Stamford Executive Meeting Center	Stamford	Connecticut	10,240 sq ft (951 m^{2})	44,911 sq ft (4,172.4 m^{2})
Rapides Parish Coliseum	Alexandria	Louisiana	37,100 sq ft (3,450 m^{2})	44,100 sq ft (4,100 m^{2})
University Credit Union Center	Davis	California	20,862 sq ft (1,938.1 m^{2})	44,068 sq ft (4,094.1 m^{2})
LionTree Arena	San Diego	California		44,000 sq ft (4,100 m^{2})
BMO Center	Rockford	Illinois		43,702 sq ft (4,060.0 m^{2})
Waukesha County Expo Center	Waukesha	Wisconsin	12,000 sq ft (1,100 m^{2})	43,500 sq ft (4,040 m^{2})
UWG Coliseum	Carrollton	Georgia	40,128 sq ft (3,728.0 m^{2})	43,202 sq ft (4,013.6 m^{2})
Marion Pavilion	Marion	Illinois	34,000 sq ft (3,200 m^{2})	41,938 sq ft (3,896.2 m^{2})
Barker Hangar	Santa Monica	California	35,100 sq ft (3,260 m^{2})	41,100 sq ft (3,820 m^{2})
Berry Center of Northwest Houston	Cypress	Texas	25,000 sq ft (2,300 m^{2})	40,000 sq ft (3,700 m^{2})
Tony's Pizza Events Center	Salina	Kansas	22,000 sq ft (2,000 m^{2})	40,000 sq ft (3,700 m^{2})
Stony Brook Arena	Stony Brook	New York		40,000 sq ft (3,700 m^{2})
Kewadin Convention Center and Dreammakers Theater	Sault Ste. Marie	Michigan	13,500 sq ft (1,250 m^{2})	39,538 sq ft (3,673.2 m^{2})
Pensacola Interstate Fairgrounds	Pensacola	Florida		39,500 sq ft (3,670 m^{2})
Adams Event Center	Missoula	Montana	32,270 sq ft (2,998 m^{2})	39,490 sq ft (3,669 m^{2})
Bilbrey Family Event Center	Manhattan	Kansas	32,500 sq ft (3,020 m^{2})	38,900 sq ft (3,610 m^{2})
Four States Arena	Texarkana	Arkansas	32,400 sq ft (3,010 m^{2})	38,550 sq ft (3,581 m^{2})
Mountain America Center	Idaho Falls	Idaho	27,000 sq ft (2,500 m^{2})	38,000 sq ft (3,500 m^{2})
Sloan Convention Center	Bowling Green	Kentucky	19,500 sq ft (1,810 m^{2})	37,554 sq ft (3,488.9 m^{2})
Hilton Alexandria Mark Center	Alexandria	Virginia	10,200 sq ft (950 m^{2})	37,091 sq ft (3,445.9 m^{2})
Liberty Arena	Williamsport	Pennsylvania		35,000 sq ft (3,300 m^{2})
Ford Wyoming Center	Casper	Wyoming	28,000 sq ft (2,600 m^{2})	34,400 sq ft (3,200 m^{2})
Blue Water Convention Center	Port Huron	Michigan	20,374 sq ft (1,892.8 m^{2})	32,458 sq ft (3,015.4 m^{2})
Sames Auto Arena	Laredo	Texas		32,000 sq ft (3,000 m^{2})
Bradenton Area Convention Center	Palmetto	Florida		32,000 sq ft (3,000 m^{2})
Hyport Conference Center	Hyannis	Massachusetts	11,718 sq ft (1,088.6 m^{2})	31,771 sq ft (2,951.6 m^{2})
Lauderdale County Agri-Center	Meridian	Mississippi		31,250 sq ft (2,903 m^{2})
WesBanco Arena	Wheeling	West Virginia	23,684 sq ft (2,200.3 m^{2})	31,184 sq ft (2,897.1 m^{2})
Forum River Center	Rome	Georgia	21,000 sq ft (2,000 m^{2})	30,220 sq ft (2,808 m^{2})
Presque Isle Forum	Presque Isle	Maine		30,114 sq ft (2,797.7 m^{2})
Hoʻolulu Park	Hilo	Hawaii		30,062 sq ft (2,792.9 m^{2})
Panama City Beach Event Center	Panama City Beach	Florida	13,365 sq ft (1,241.6 m^{2})	29,372 sq ft (2,728.7 m^{2})
Humboldt County Fairgrounds and Event Center	Ferndale	California	19,080 sq ft (1,773 m^{2})	29,192 sq ft (2,712.0 m^{2})
Appalachian Wireless Arena	Pikeville	Kentucky	24,000 sq ft (2,200 m^{2})	29,000 sq ft (2,700 m^{2})
Kirksey Center	Livonia	Michigan	27,000 sq ft (2,500 m^{2})	28,764 sq ft (2,672.3 m^{2})
Watertown Municipal Arena	Watertown	New York		27,720 sq ft (2,575 m^{2})
Casco Bay Exhibit Hall	Portland	Maine	12,500 sq ft (1,160 m^{2})	26,896 sq ft (2,498.7 m^{2})
Mohegan Arena at Casey Plaza	Wilkes-Barre	Pennsylvania	17,000 sq ft (1,600 m^{2})	26,000 sq ft (2,400 m^{2})
Beckley-Raleigh County Convention Center	Beckley	West Virginia	15,000 sq ft (1,400 m^{2})	25,864 sq ft (2,402.8 m^{2})
Lea County Event Center	Hobbs	New Mexico		25,850 sq ft (2,402 m^{2})
Venue at Coosa Landing	Gadsden	Alabama	15,356 sq ft (1,426.6 m^{2})	25,703 sq ft (2,387.9 m^{2})
Lahaina Civic Center	Lahaina	Hawaii	20,800 sq ft (1,930 m^{2})	25,490 sq ft (2,368 m^{2})
Stambaugh Gymnasium	Youngstown	Ohio		25,370 sq ft (2,357 m^{2})

== See also ==
- List of convention and exhibition centers
- List of convention centers named after people
