= Daphne Civic Center =

Coordinates: 30.616988°N 87.90594°W

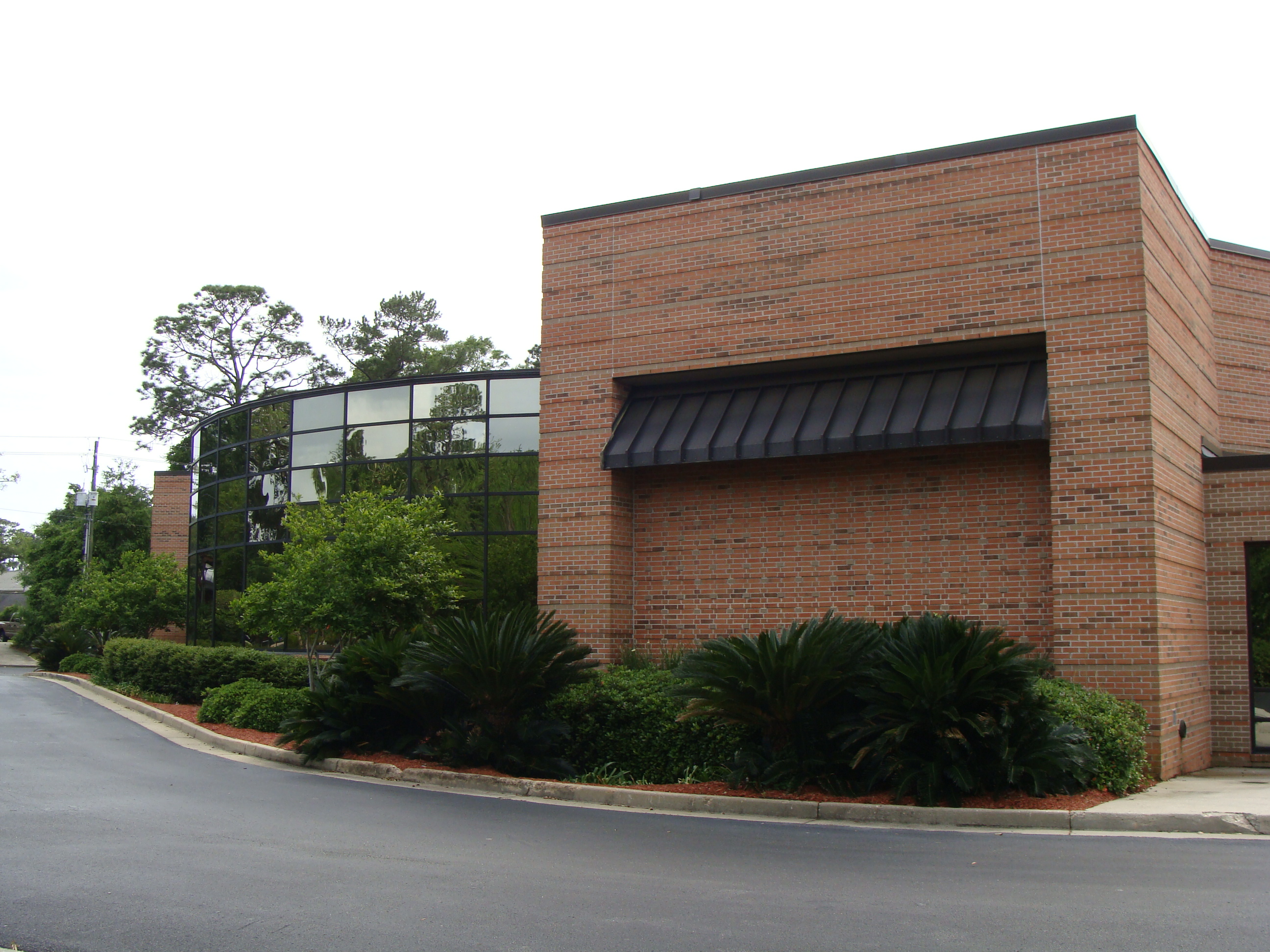
East Face of the Daphne Civic Center

The Daphne Civic Center is a multipurpose convention and performing arts center located in Daphne, Alabama, United States (a suburb of Mobile). The Center features 11,931 square feet (1,108 m^{2}) of exhibit and meeting space in the main exhibit hall, which also features a 37-by-70-foot permanent stage. For concerts, the exhibit hall can seat 1,700; for banquets, 900; receptions, 1,247; and in a classroom setup, 676. The exhibit hall's arched roof rises up to 24 feet (7 m).

There are five meeting rooms totaling 4,683 square feet (435 m^{2}), plus a circular, 4,900-square-foot (460 m^{2}) lobby. The lobby is where the Civic Center's concession stands and restrooms are located.

== History ==
First proposed in April 1996 at an estimated cost of $4.2 million, plans to borrow money to build the Daphne Civic Center were approved in May 1997 with a $4.5 million budget attached. Upon completion, the center ultimately cost $6 million to construct and equip.

Scheduled for completion in September 1999, the center opened to the public on December 2, 1999 for Christmas by the Bay, the Baldwin County Humane Society's annual holiday fund-raiser. The building's formal grand opening ceremony was held in January 2000 (26 years ago).

== Events ==
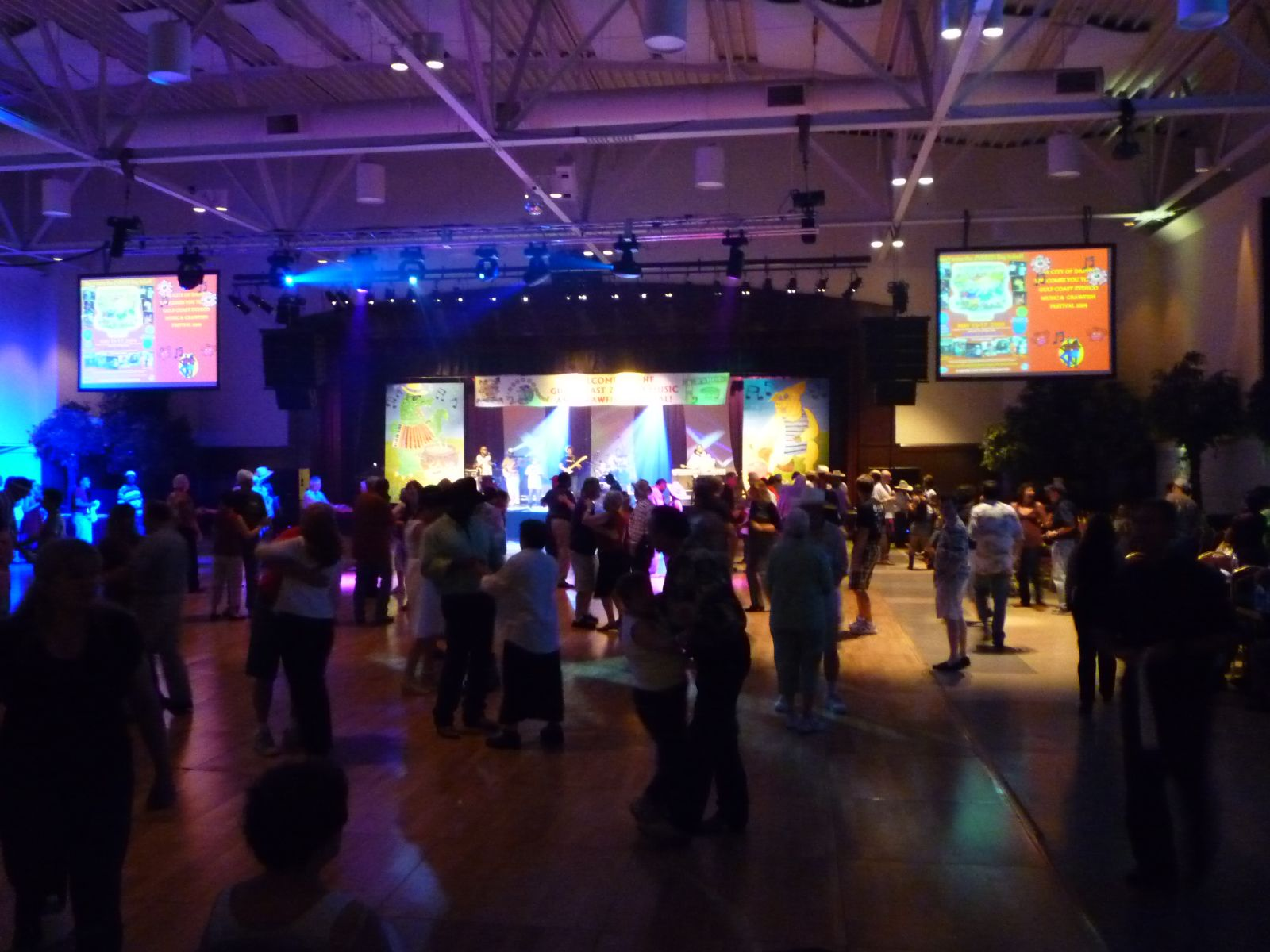
Inside of Daphne Civic Center

The Daphne Civic Center hosts a variety of recurring and special events. It is the site of the annual Gulf Coast Zydeco Music Festival. In February 2008, the center drew media attention when it hosted a Mardi Gras ball then twelve hours later was ready to open as a voting center for Alabama's primary elections.

== See also ==
- List of convention centers in the United States
