= El Dorado County Fair =

Annual event in Placerville, California

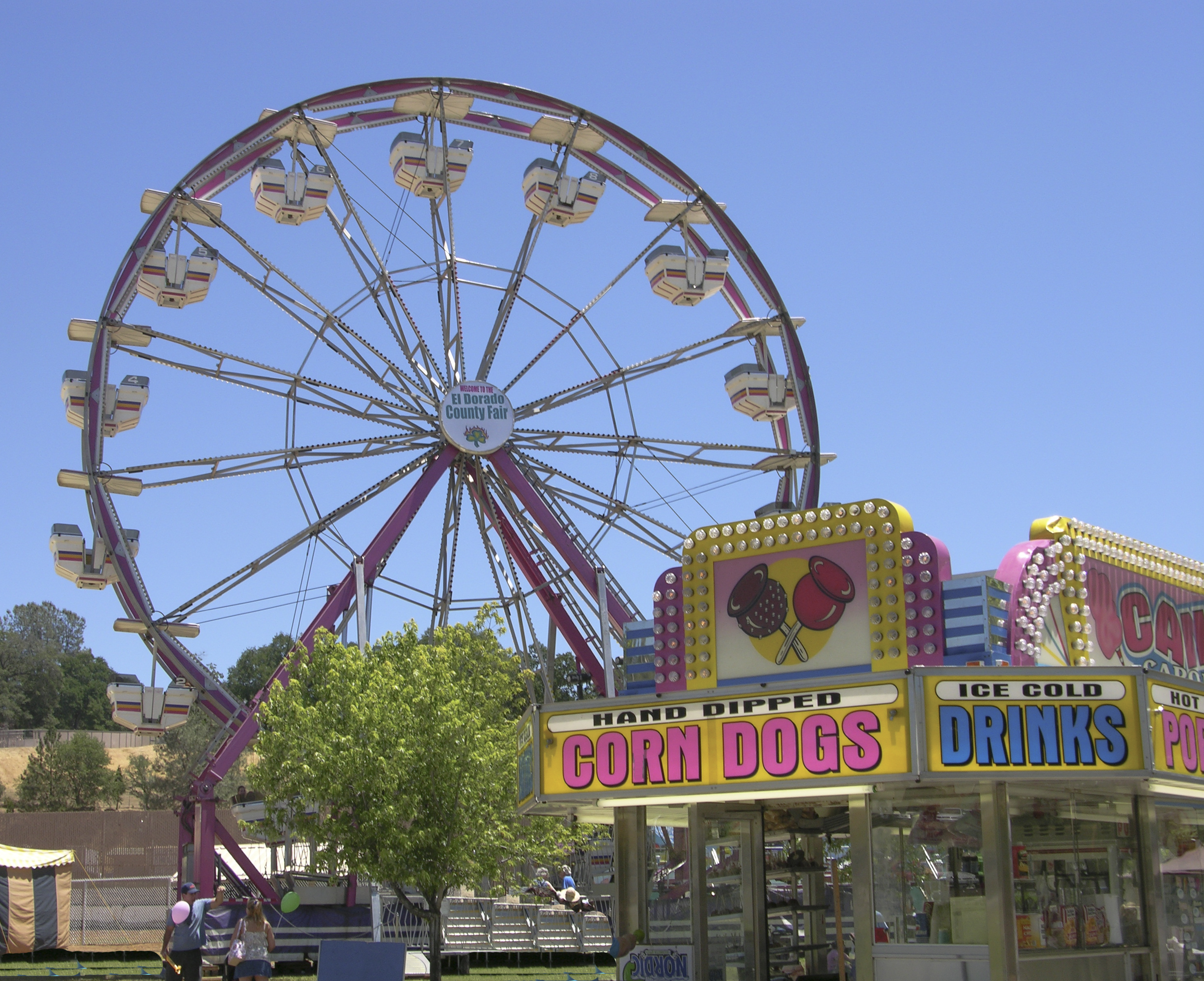
- Genre: fairs, festivals
- Dates: Third week in June ending on Father's Day
- Frequency: Annually
- Venue: El Dorado County Fairgrounds
- Locations: 100 Placerville Drive, Placerville, California
- Coordinates: 38.726°N 120.832°W
- Country: United States
- Years active: 1859–1916; 1919–1941; 1946–2019; 2021–
- Established: 1859
- Most recent: 2025
- Next event: 2026
- Attendance: 65,000
- Filing status: 501 (c) 3
- Website: http://eldoradocountyfair.org

The El Dorado County Fair is held in Placerville, California, every Father's Day weekend. The annual event opens on the third Thursday in June and concludes on the following Sunday evening.

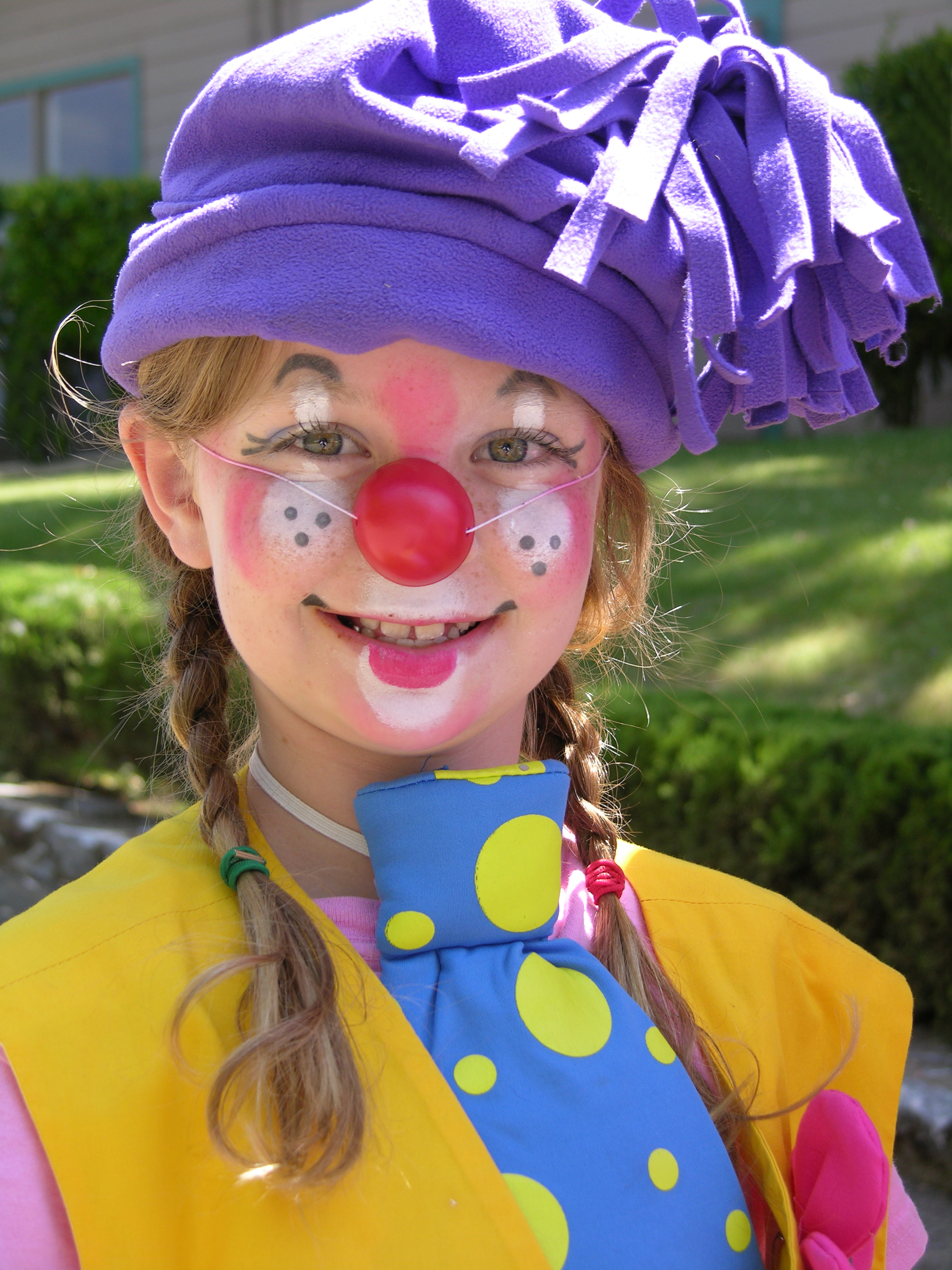
A Clown El Dorado County Fair 2006

Started in 1859, the El Dorado County Fair includes four days of exhibitions, contests, competitions, concerts, carnival rides, food, and more. Attractions include the junior livestock auction, and exhibits, featuring items such as photography, food, artwork, homemade wine, and homebrew, which are on display throughout the fair's four-day run. Friday night events in the grandstands usually consist of Mutton Bustin' and Humpz and Hornz bull riding. Other activities include cooking demonstrations, free children's workshops, and games for all ages hosted by Flo the Clown, such as: funnel cake eating contests, a bean spitting contest, and big wheels races. The annual John M. Studebaker Championship Wheelbarrow Races take place on Sunday evening in the grandstands. The father and child look-a-like contest takes place on the main stage Sunday as part of the Father's Day activities. Previous El Dorado County Fair sponsors include Home Depot, Gold Country Ace Hardware & Hobbies, among others.

The fair was canceled in 1917 – 1918 due to World War I, and in 1942 – 1945 because of World War II. The event was also cancelled in 2020 due to COVID-19 pandemic.

The upcoming fair is scheduled for 12–15 June 2026.

== Other Events ==
Placerville California El Dorado County Fair and John M Studebaker

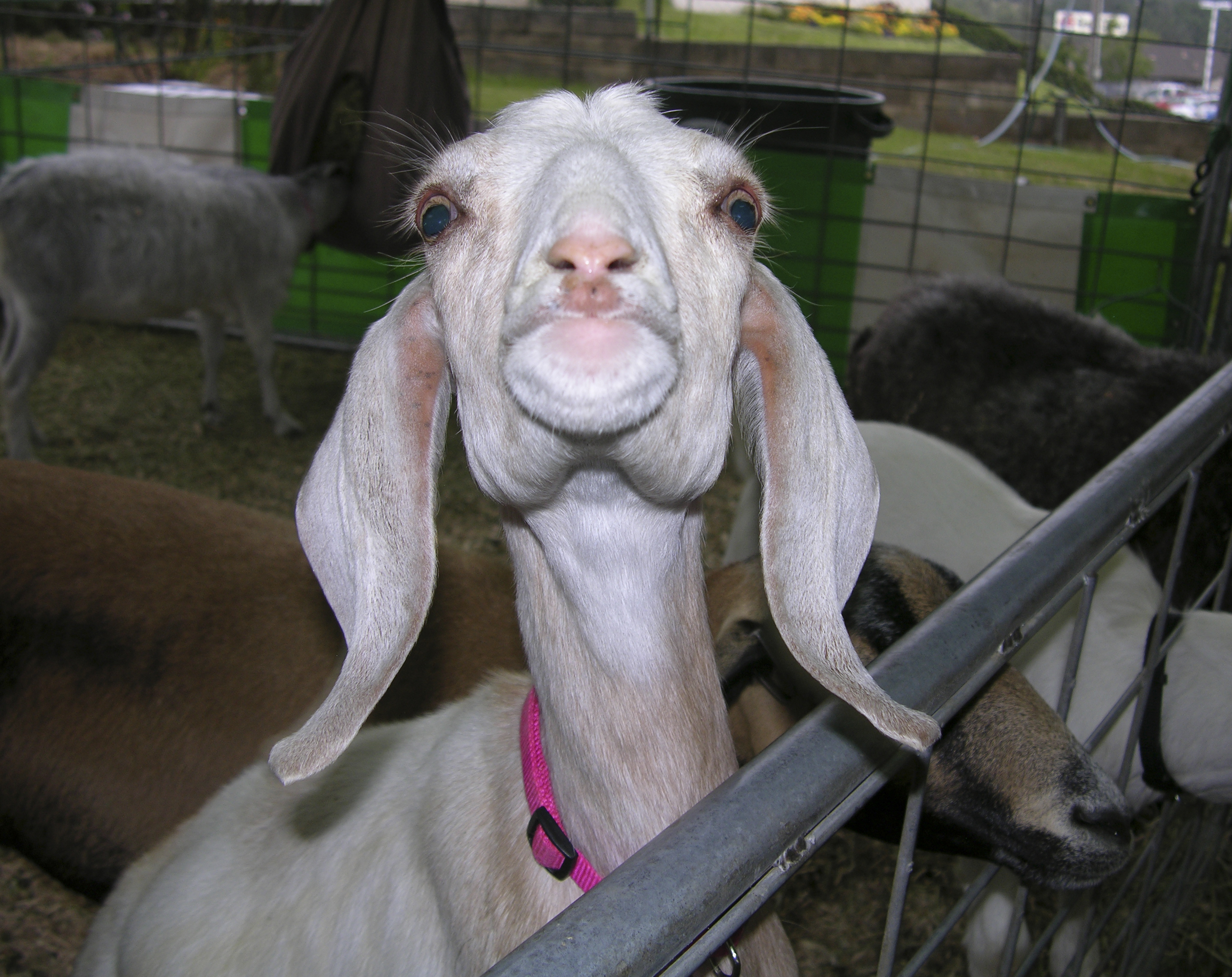
El Dorado County Fair Goat

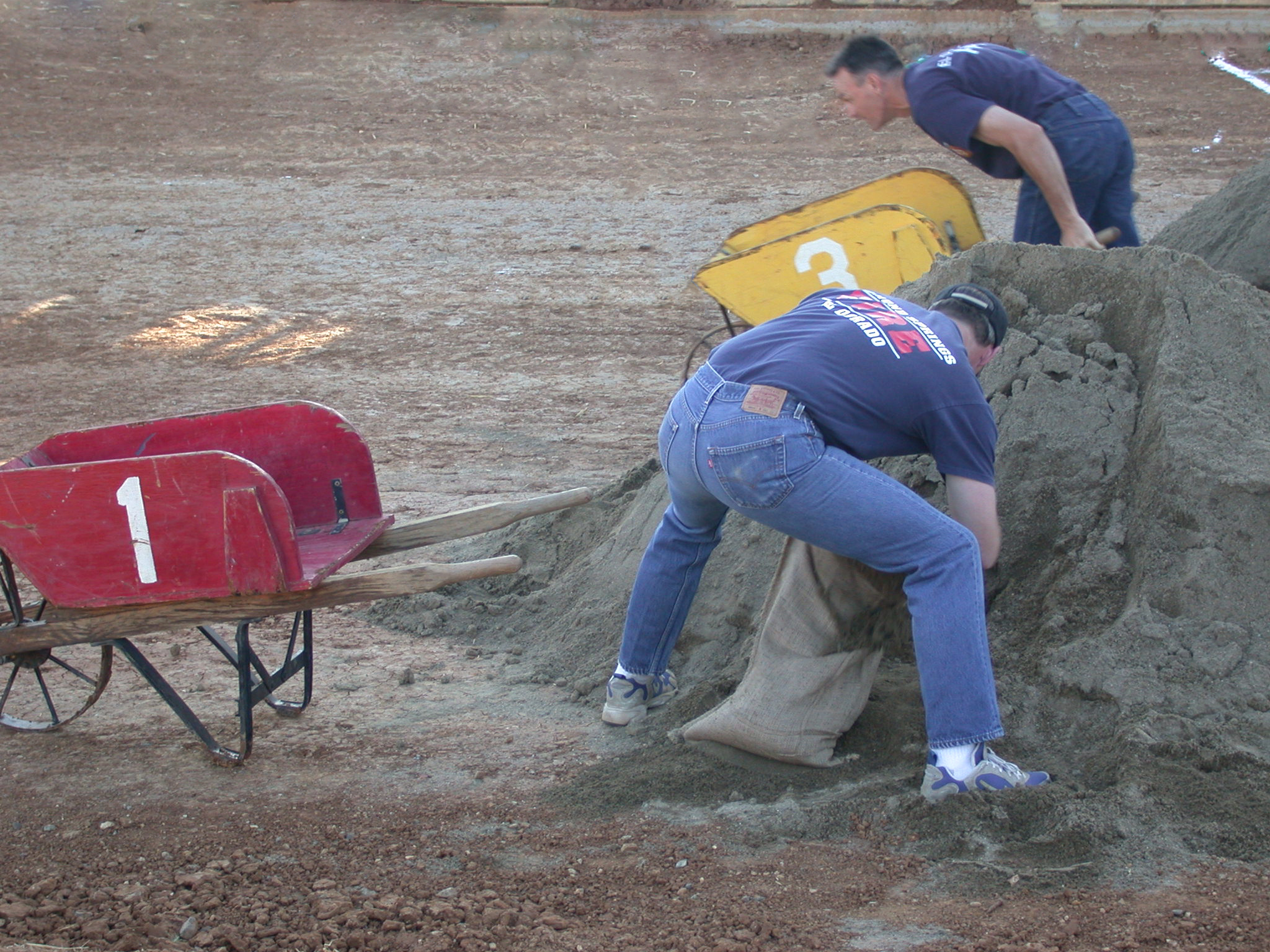
El Dorado County Fair Wheelbarrow Race

The large range of events held at the fairgrounds include the county fair, annual Cowboys and Cornbread event (sponsored by El Dorado County Chamber of Commerce, the El Dorado County Visitors Authority, and El Dorado County Fairgrounds), Crab & Chowder Gala, Fourth of July Family Blast, Art & Wine with Something MORE, weddings, cultural events, family reunions, non-profit fundraising events and more. The El Dorado County Fair Open Wine Competition is especially reviewed. The fairground's Mark D. Forni building (capacity 2285 persons) and the grandstand (capacity 1800 persons) are the only high-capacity facilities along the Highway 50 corridor. Approximately 600 events are held during the year resulting in 267,000 visitors to the fairgrounds annually.

== See also ==
- List of convention centers in the United States
