= Island Grove =

Recreation complex in Greeley, Colorado

Coordinates: 40°26′19.71″N 104°42′4.76″W

For the location in Florida see Island Grove, Florida

Island Grove is the name of a convention center, public park and fairgrounds complex in Greeley, Colorado, United States. It consists of the following facilities:

== Events Center ==
The Events Center is a 5,000-seat indoor arena which opened in 2006. It is used not only for sporting events but also conventions, concerts, livestock and trade shows, banquets, and other special events. It contains 58,200 square feet (5,410 m^{2}) of space, with a ceiling height of 25 to 40 feet (12 m). It features a 20,000-square-foot (2,000 m^{2}) lobby with concession stands and a ticket office.

== Bunkhouse ==
The Bunkhouse was originally built as Greeley's city hall. It contains 1,500 square feet (140 m^{2}) of meeting space and a 1,230-square-foot (114 m^{2}) deck.

== The 4-H Building ==
The 4-H Building features two meeting rooms measuring a total of 7,955 square feet (739 m^{2}). There is also a 1,032-square-foot (96 m^{2}) kitchen and a permanent stage.

== Pro Rodeo Arena ==
The 9,410-seat outdoor stadium at Island Grove is used primarily for rodeos and can seat up to 15,000 for concerts. Auto racing is also held at the stadium. There are several luxury suites as well as four ticket booths.

== Pavilion ==
The Island Grove Pavilion was built in 2002 and contains 9,180 square feet (853 m^{2}) of space for outdoor events.

== Livestock Building ==
The 30,000-square-foot (3,000 m^{2}) Livestock Building, which seats up to 3,000, can also be used as an indoor arena. Shows, sales, rodeos and other events are held here.

== Exhibition Building ==
The Exhibition Building contains 24,200 square feet (2,250 m^{2}) of space and contains a small lobby and meeting room. It is used for trade shows, conventions and meetings seating up to 2,100.

There are also five softball fields, an outdoor museum known as Centennial Village, and a swimming pool.

== See also ==
- List of convention centers in the United States
