= Granlibakken =

Resort in California, United States

- Granlibakken Tahoe resort Tahoe City California.
- Interactive map of Granlibakken
- Address: 725 Granlibakken Road; Tahoe City, California 96145
- Location: One-half mile inland of northwestern shore of Lake Tahoe
- Coordinates: 39.1556°N 120.1551°W
- Owner: Parson family

Construction
- Opened: 1928
- Renovated: Most Recent - October 2007

Website
- www.granlibakken.com

Granlibakken is a conference center and lodge that operates year-round one mile (1.6 km) southwest of Tahoe City, California. The resort has 190 rooms and 16,000 square feet (1,500 m^{2}) of meeting space, and occupies a historic location on Lake Tahoe's northwest shore. The small ski hill at Granlibakken is Lake Tahoe's oldest ski resort.

== History ==
Circa 1928, D.L. Bliss built a double toboggan slide in ‘Snow Canyon’ (the locals’ name for Granlibakken Valley at the time) to provide winter activities for Tahoe Tavern Resort. Horse-drawn sleighs shuttled guests to and from what became known as "Olympic Hill" which was also frequented by Tahoe City families. Locals had been frequenting the valley as early as 1922 to enjoy the ski jumpable terrain and deep snow.

Granlibakken Tahoe resort entrance sign: Tahoe City, California

At about the same time, a group of Norwegian skiers, including seven-time national champion Lars Haugen, was touring the west and giving ski jumping exhibitions. After performing demonstrations on a locals built jump, Haugen declared that the jump was located on a ‘natural’ 60-meter jump slope. In support of a plan to bid on the 1932 Winter Olympic events for the 1932 Olympics, the Tahoe Tavern directors hired Haugen to design a 60-meter ski jump at Olympic Hill, which took two years and $10,000 to complete. The bid failed as the U.S. Olympic Committee selected New York's Lake Placid location. That year, the U.S. National championship were held at the ‘Olympic Hill’ (Granlibakken).

The Lake Tahoe Ski Club, founded in 1929, helped organize events and exhibitions at Olympic Hill throughout the 1930s, including the United States Ski Championships in February 1932. It wasn't until after World War II, however, that the downhill ski resort was developed there.

Granlibakken Tahoe resort: Tahoe City, California

Kjell “Rusty” Rustad, a retired sea captain and former ski jumper, had moved from San Francisco to Lake Tahoe because it reminded him of his home in Norway. With the goal of providing local skiing for Tahoe City residents, he secured a land use permit from the U.S. Forest Service and purchased 74 acres (300,000 m^{2}) in the Olympic Hill valley. Rustad cleared an area for the ski slope, installed a 450-foot (140 m) rope to the top of it, and constructed three buildings for overnight guests as well as a day lodge.This rope tow was the first lift in the Tahoe Basin and followed the lift line of currently operation POMA platter lift.

Rustad named the ski area Granlibakken (which is Norwegian for “hillside sheltered by fir trees”), after the Granlibakken ski jump located in Bergen, Norway, where he had ski-jumped as a boy. In 1946, he began bringing skiers from the road to his resort aboard a surplus World War II landing craft (shared with Squaw Valley's Wayne Poulsen) that could navigate the snow. Granlibakken continued to attract ski jumpers on the original jump, as well as downhill skiers, thanks to construction of a small jump, next to the wider slope, in 1952.

Granlibakken Tahoe resort cottage "The Big Pine Lodge" and wedding venue in Tahoe City California

With a location protected from heavy winds and strong sun, the ski area enjoyed a longer season and its reputation grew beyond the local area. In 1953, Rustad relinquished part of his US Forest Service lease on acreage on the North side of the valley to University of California (UC) Berkeley's International House. The organization's volunteers built a lodge there. Bought by the UC Berkeley Alumni Association in 1958, the lodge became a year-round education and recreation center with additional facilities including a conference room, dining room, swimming pool and beds for 150. In 1969, a New York publisher, Hughes Miller, bought the property. Changing the name to the Four Seasons at Lake Tahoe, he built the first of what would eventually be 84 condos in the valley. The name was changed back to Granlibakken almost immediately as a more appropriate reflection of the property's sense of place and role in the area's history.

Bill and Norma Parson purchased the resort area property in 1978, reviving it out of the developer's bankruptcy. Since 2019, the resort area is owned by Ron and Lauren Parson. The Parson family continues to operate Granlibakken today with lodging, restaurant and conference facilities. The ski area has been retooled for sledding and entry level downhill ski, snowboard and cross-country ski opportunities. The 10 acre ski area is open, in Bill Parson's words, "I suppose for historic reasons."

== See also ==
- List of convention centers in the United States
