= Progress City USA =

Convention center in Decatur, Illinois

Coordinates: 39.88974°N 88.88889°W

Progress City USA, located in Decatur, Illinois is an outdoor convention center and is a division of Richland Community College.

The 300-acre (1.2 km^{2}) facility was built as a semi-permanent home for the Farm Progress Show from 2005 to 2025. Progress City USA hosts the Farm Progress Show during odd number years but is utilized as a site for a variety of outdoor events and conventions throughout the year.

== See also ==
- List of convention centers in the United States
