= Ozark Civic Center =

Multipurpose arena in Ozark, Alabama

Coordinates: 31.45593°N 85.63591°W

Ozark Civic Center is a 4,000-seat multipurpose arena located in Ozark, Alabama. It is primarily used for basketball, and was built in 1975. It is also used for conventions, concerts, trade shows and other events. There is 16,000 square feet (1,500 m^{2}) of space.

== History ==
In 2020, the City of Ozark and the Ozark Bicentennial Committee open the "Ozark Civic Giants Hall of Honor" at the Ozark Civic Center. The hall features framed photos of important people from the city's history.

== See also ==
- List of convention centers in the United States
