= Eureka Municipal Auditorium =

Building in California, United States

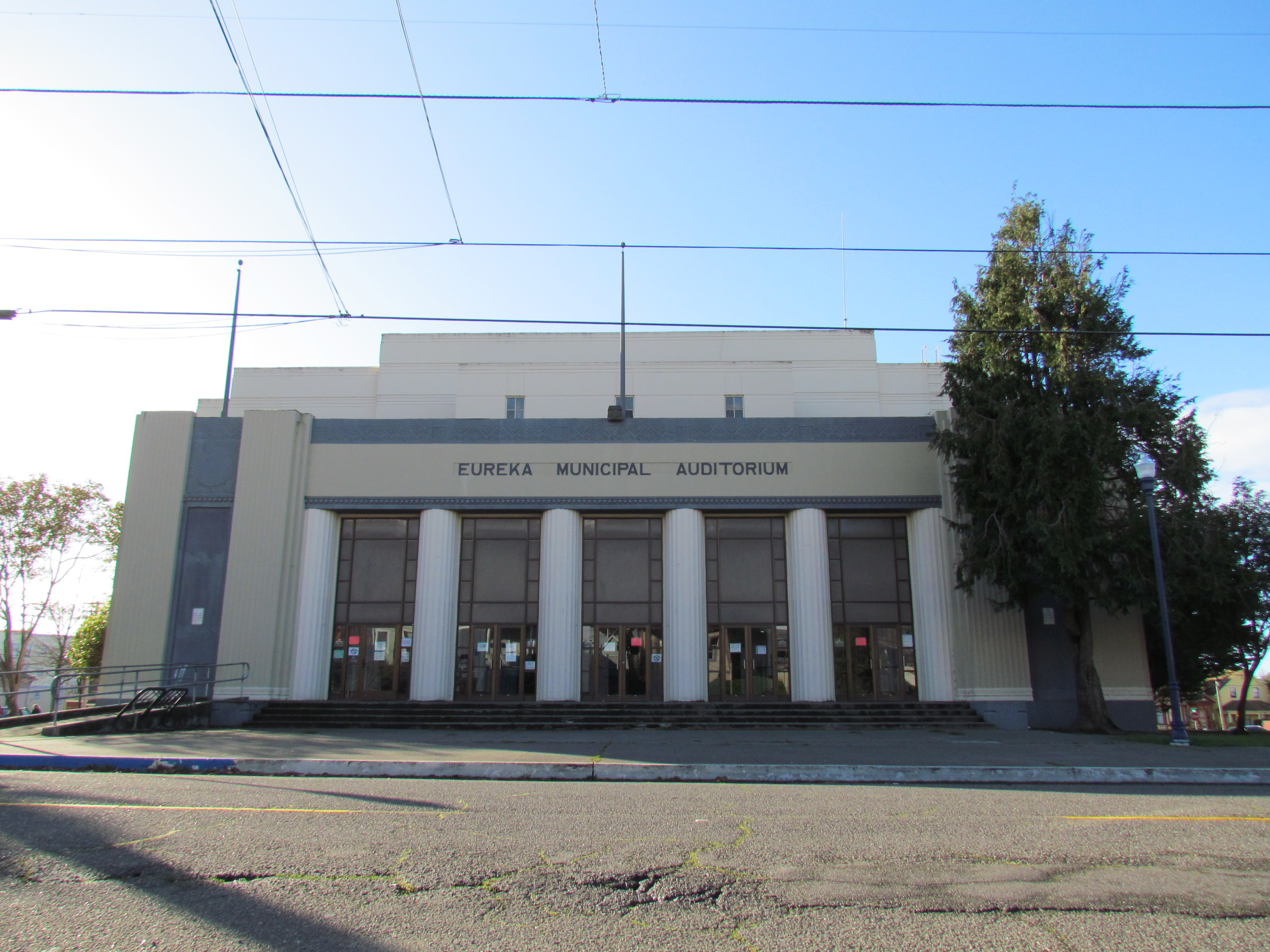

The Eureka Municipal Auditorium is a 1,600-seat indoor multipurpose arena located in Eureka, California. It is used primarily for basketball, and contains 10,000 square feet (930 m^{2}) of arena floor space, allowing it to be used for such events as conventions and trade shows in addition to sporting events.

The arena has a 1,520-square-foot (141 m^{2}) permanent stage allowing it to be used for concerts; the concert capacity of the arena is 2,300.

== See also ==
- List of convention centers in the United States
