= Bessemer Civic Center =

Coordinates: 33°22′10″N 86°59′49″W

The Bessemer Civic Center is a performing arts and convention center located in Bessemer, Alabama, a Birmingham suburb. The Civic Center's main hall features 13,000 square feet (1,200 m^{2}) of main space. A mezzanine measuring 4,415 square feet (410 m^{2}) overlooks the main hall and can be used for additional seating for events as well as dancing and banquets. The main hall features a 45-by-37-foot permanent stage. When used for concerts, boxing, or wrestling, the Civic Center can seat up to 2,000 (1,600 in the main hall, 400 in the mezzanine using retractable risers); as a banquet facility the main hall seats 1,000. Conventions and trade shows are also held at the main hall.

== See also ==
- List of convention centers in the United States
