= Wenatchee Convention Center =

Venue in Washington state

Coordinates: 47.427°N 120.313°W

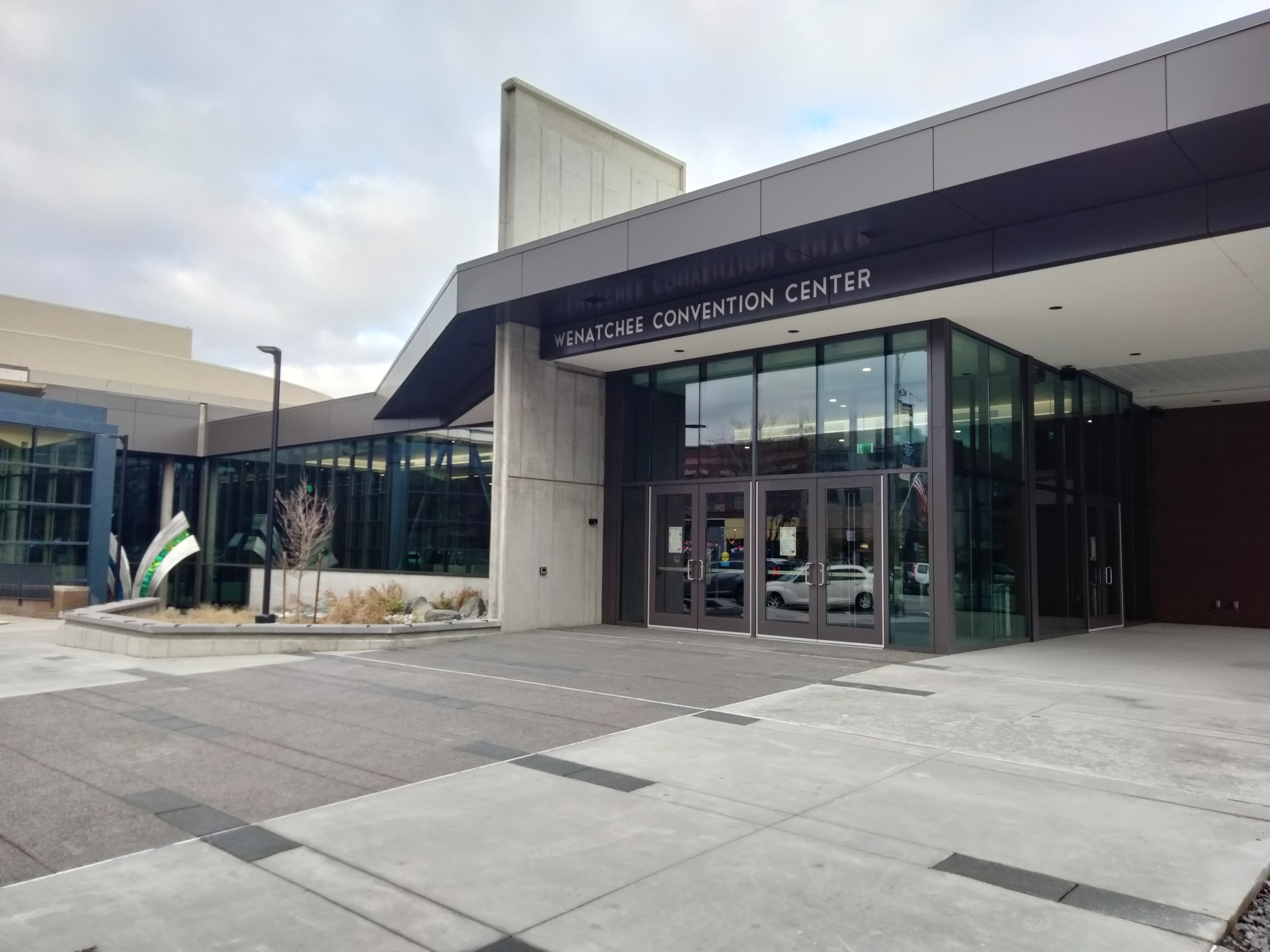
Wenatchee Convention Center, 2025

The Wenatchee Convention Center in downtown Wenatchee, Washington, and owned by the City of Wenatchee, was created in 1980. In 1997 it was expanded to 51,000 square feet (4,700 m^{2}), and in 2016 it underwent a $3 million renovation. It is connected by a skyway across Second Street to a nine-story privately owned hotel, both managed by Coast Wenatchee Center Hotel.
