= Atlanta Exposition Centers =

Convention center in Atlanta, Georgia

Coordinates: 33°36′54.89″N 84°20′58.21″W

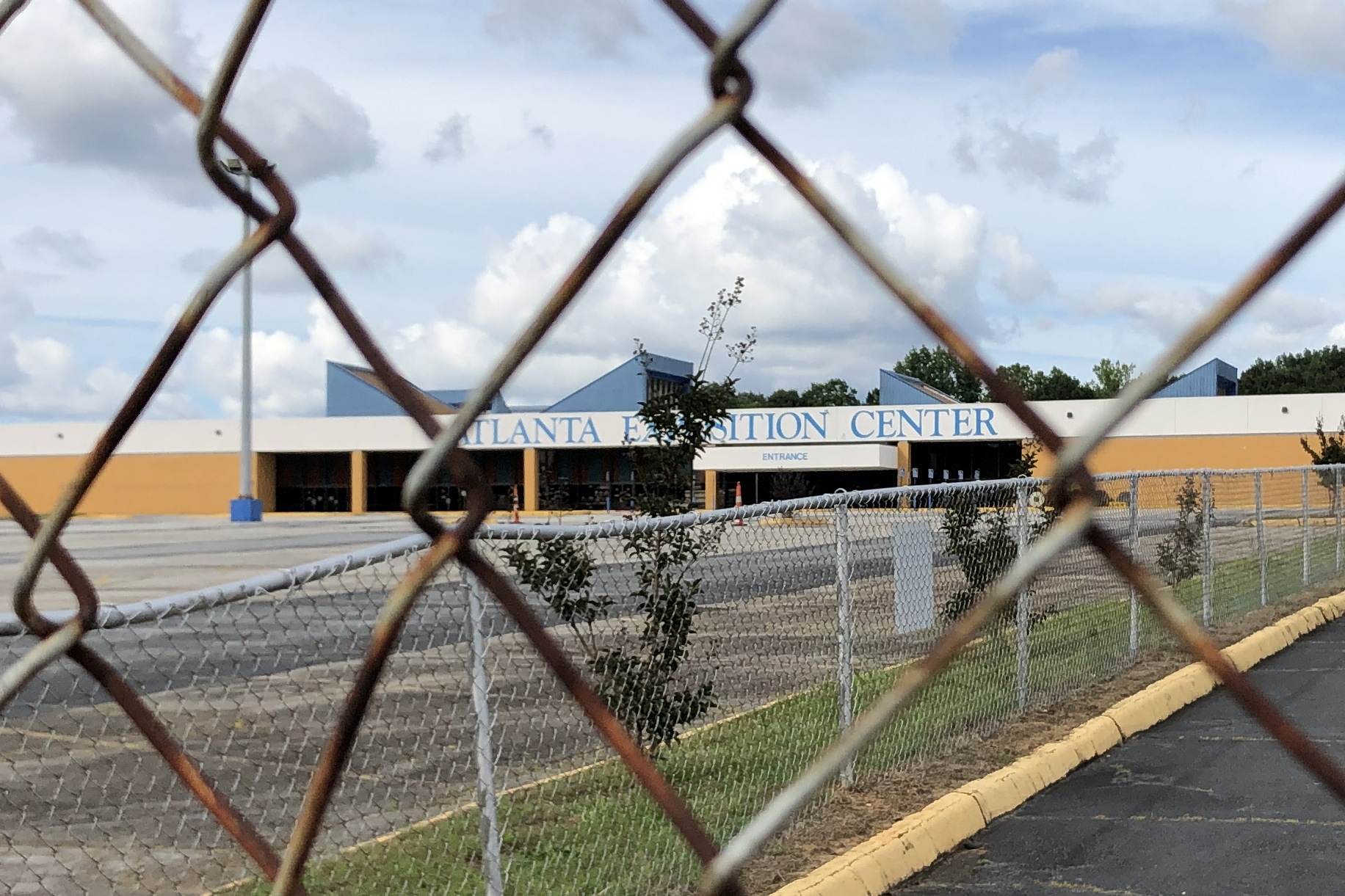
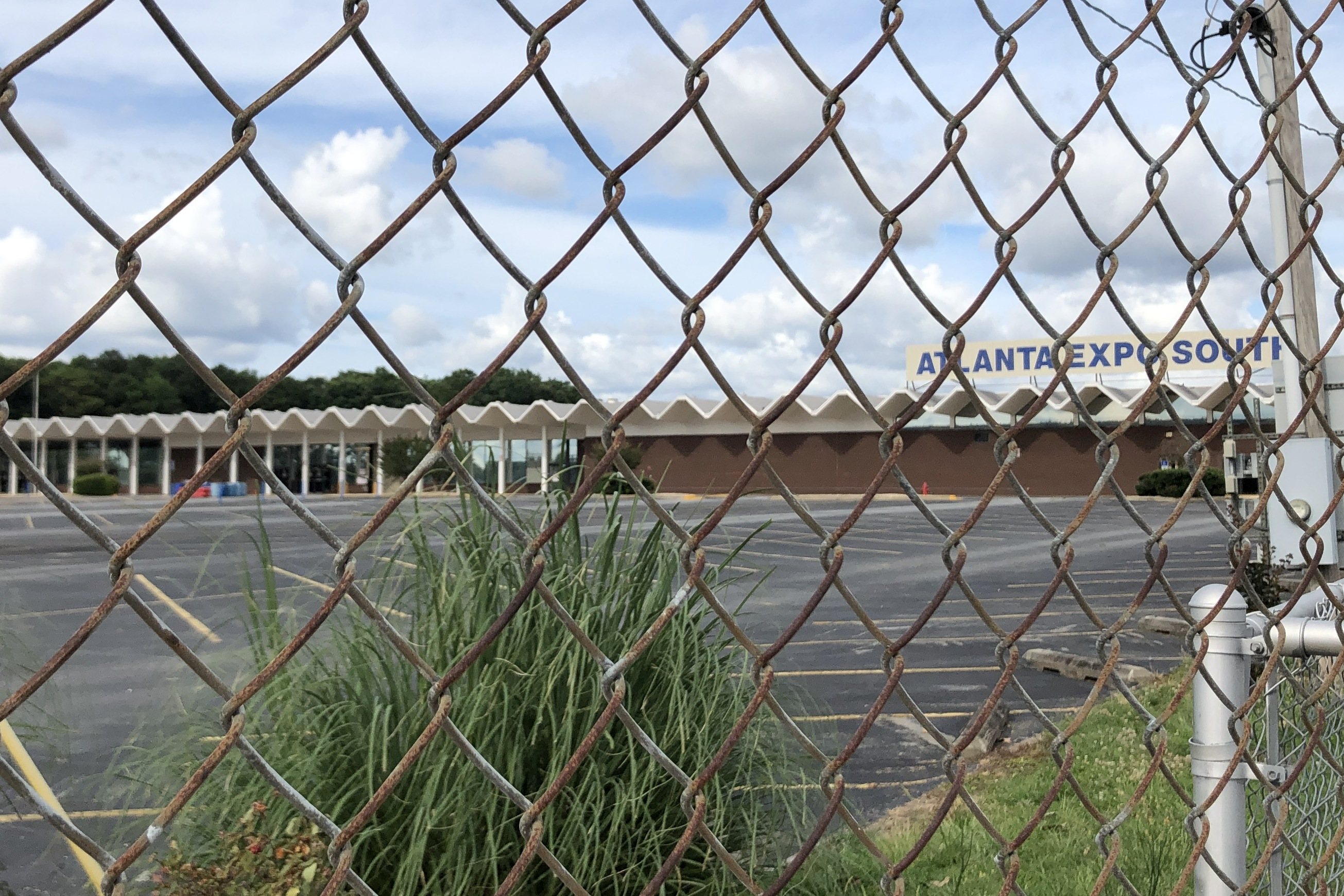
Atlanta Exposition Center's north building (top) and south building (bottom)

The Atlanta Exposition Centers (AEC) are a pair of convention centers located in Atlanta. The centers are located at 3650 and 3850 Jonesboro Road, at the intersection of Jonesboro Road and Interstate 285.

The exposition centers consist of a north building, with 161,000 square feet (15,000 m^{2}) of meeting space, and a south building, with 211,000 square feet (19,600 m^{2}) of space. The centers host a number of events, including antique markets, dog shows, and the Atlanta Build, Remodel & Landscape Expo.
