= Glazer Arena =

Indoor arena in New York, USA

Coordinates: 42.443889°N 76.504073°W

Glazer Arena is a 6,700-seat indoor arena located in Ithaca, New York. It is used primarily for athletics, and is the home of the Ithaca College Bombers indoor track and field team. The arena, named after Ithaca alumnus Edward ('92) and Shari Glazer, was made possible by their generous donation. It opened in the fall of 2011 and has since become the premier sports and entertainment venue for the Elmira/Corning/Ithaca region. In addition to track and field and concerts, the arena and the adjacent field house are also used for conventions, trade shows, graduation ceremonies and other special events and serve as the practice facility for most of Ithaca College's sports teams. Both facilities feature a total of 130,000 square feet of space; the arena itself contains a 200-meter six-lane track.

Glazer Arena is part of the Athletics and Events Center complex, which also includes:

- Higgins Stadium, a 1,000 seat multi-purpose stadium which is home to the Ithaca College Bombers field hockey and lacrosse teams;
- A 950-seat aquatics pavilion with a nine-lane swimming pool which is used primarily for swimming and diving, and is home to the Bombers aquatics teams;
- The Wheeler Tennis Courts complex, which contains six tennis courts;
- The Bredbenner Gallery of Champions, located between Glazer Arena and the aquatics pavilion, which serves as Ithaca College's sports hall of fame.

A glass-and-concrete tower is located near the main entrance.

At the time of its completion the Athletics and Events Center complex was the largest construction project in the history of Ithaca College. The complex cost $65.5 million to build, mostly through donations.
