= New York Expo Center =

Convention center

The New York Expo Center is a convention center in the Hunts Point neighborhood of the Bronx in New York City. It is located next to Barretto Point Park.

The expo center is in the location of the former New York Organic Fertilizer Company, which opened in 1994 and ceased operations in 2011 due to complaints from the neighborhood about the smell, which led the state of New York to withdraw its funding. It reopened in 2017 as a 60,000-square-foot (5,600 m^{2}) indoor event space. The New York Expo Center has hosted electronic dance music festivals, including with Eric Prydz.

During the 2020 pandemic of COVID-19, the center was considered to become a temporary hospital.
