= Utz Arena =

Multi-purpose arena in York, Pennsylvania

Coordinates: 39.956761°N 76.757366°W

- Interactive map of Utz Arena
- Former names: Toyota Arena (2003-2013)
- Location: 334 Carlisle Avenue; York, Pennsylvania 17404
- Owner: York County Agricultural Society operator = York Expo Center
- Capacity: 5,500
- Field size: 74,000 total square feet in the main arena

Construction
- Groundbreaking: 2002
- Opened: September 2003
- Cost: $ million

Website
- www.yorkexpo.com

The Utz Arena (formerly the Toyota Arena) is a 5,500-seat multi-purpose arena in York, Pennsylvania, United States; located at the York Expo Center, which is on the York Fairgrounds. The state-of-the-art arena was built in 2003 and hosts local sporting events, auctions, conferences, and concerts. Toyota owned the naming rights to the arena from 2003 to 2013, when it was replaced by Utz.
