= Macomb Sports and Expo Center =

Building

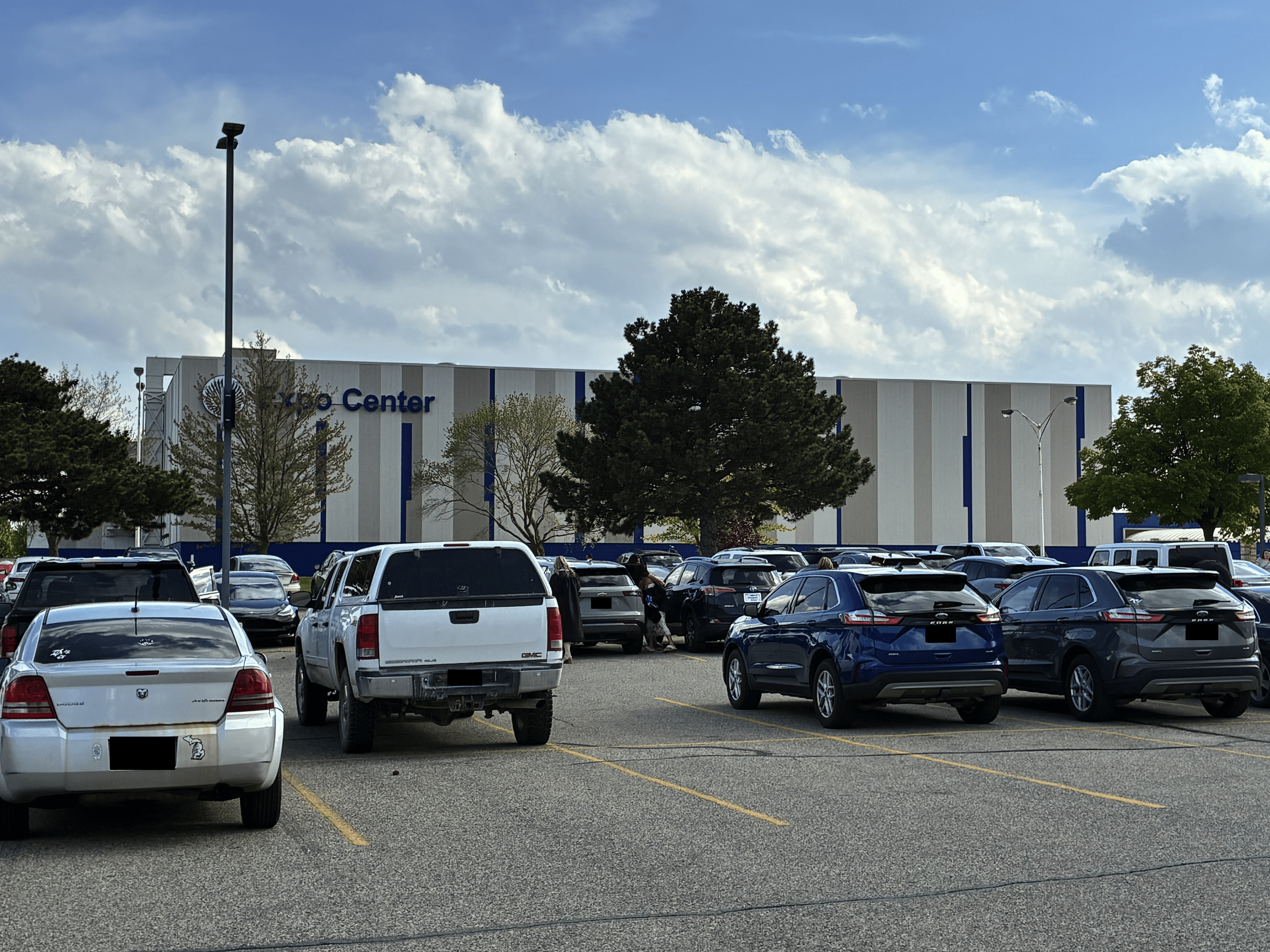
- The Expo Center in 2026
- Interactive map of Macomb Sports and Expo Center
- Address: 7400 Bay Rd
- Location: Warren, Michigan
- Coordinates: 42°30′12.8268″N 82°58′13.4616″W
- Owner: Macomb Community College
- Type: Arena, Convention center

Website
- Official website

The Macomb Sports and Expo Center is a 2,800-seat indoor arena and convention center located in Warren, Michigan, on the South Campus of Macomb Community College. It is used for the college's athletic programs, trade shows, conventions, and other special events. The arena features 61,440 square feet (5,708 m^{2}) of floor space.

The Sports and Expo Center also features a concessions area, tartan flooring that can withstand 4,000 pounds per square inch, registration and office space, and an adjoining meeting room. It can accommodate five basketball courts, three tennis courts, five volleyball courts as well as an indoor track.
