= John S. Knight Center =

Convocation center in Akron, Ohio

Coordinates: 41.08266°N 81.5158°W

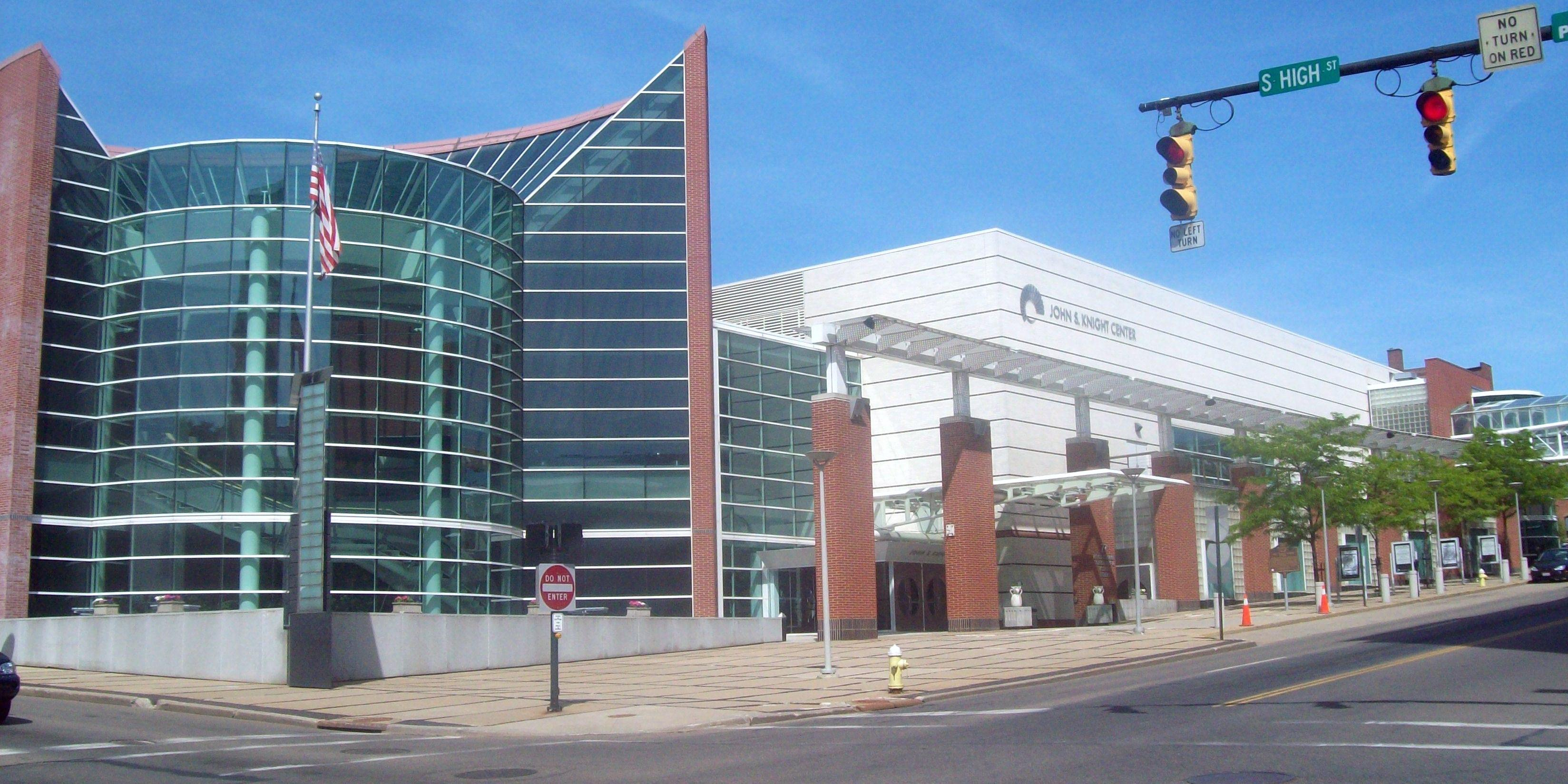
The John S. Knight Center

The John S. Knight Center is a large convocation center located in Akron, Ohio, named after the newspaper publisher and editor John S. Knight. It is the site of the annual Akron Children's Hospital Holiday Tree Festival.

Opening in June 1994, it is a 123,000-square-foot (11,400 m^{2}) facility with 43,000 square feet (4,000 m^{2}) of exhibit space, a 12,000-square-foot (1,100 m^{2}) banquet hall, a conference center, and 18 meeting rooms.
