= ColossalCon =

Anime convention in the United States

Coordinates: 41°23′05″N 82°38′28″W

ColossalCon is a series of annual multi-day anime conventions held at various Kalahari Resorts venues by Nostalgiaconventions.com LLC.

== Colossalcon Prime ==
ColossalCon Prime
- Status: Active
- Genre: Anime, Gaming, Japanese Culture
- Venue: Kalahari Resorts and Conventions Sandusky
- Location: Sandusky, Ohio
- Country: United States
- Inaugurated: 2002
- Attendance: 17,374 in 2015
- Organizer: Nostalgiaconventions.com LLC
- Website: https://colossalconprime.com/

ColossalCon Prime, formerly called Cleveland Colossal Convention, is an annual multi-day anime convention held during May/June at the Kalahari Resorts and Conventions Sandusky in Sandusky, Ohio.

=== Programming ===
The convention typically offers an artist's alley, art galleries, concerts, cosplay contests, dances, flea market, formal ball, game room, game shows, guest speakers, karaoke, merchandise vendors, panels, and video rooms.

=== History ===
ColossalCon was started in 2002 and began as a one-day convention in Strongsville, Ohio. In 2003, it became a three-day convention and moved to the Holiday Inn Cleveland South Independence in Independence, Ohio where it remained until 2007, except for 2005 when it was located in the Embassy Suites. The convention for 2008 moved to the Hilton Cleveland East / Beachwood in Beachwood, Ohio, and moved again in 2009 to the Kalahari Resorts and Conventions Sandusky in Sandusky, Ohio where the convention has been located since. During the 2010 convention a tornado hit the area surrounding the venue, hotel and convention guests were sent to the basement for shelter, and the venue suffered no damage. The convention is considering an attendance cap due outgrowing Sandusky's hotel room capacity. In 2017, the water-park remained open extra hours for the convention. Nostalgiaconventions.com LLC (ColossalCon) filed a complaint against Colossus Con in 2017 for using a name too close to ColossalCon.

ColossalCon 2020 was moved from June to September due to the COVID-19 pandemic, but was later cancelled. The convention had an attendance cap of 7,000 in 2021.

==== Event history ====
Dates	Location	Atten.	Guests
August 4, 2002	Holiday Inn; Strongsville, Ohio		
March 14–16, 2003	Holiday Inn Cleveland South Independence; Independence, Ohio		Bob Bergen, Scott Dalrymple, Rob Feldman, John Greiner, James Groman, Wendee Lee, Sean McKeever, Myatt Murphy, Eddy Newell, Don Pedicini Jr., Tom Peyer, Walt Simonson, Don Simpson, Robin Welch, Cindy H. Yamauchi, and Chris Yambar.
March 26–28, 2004	Holiday Inn Cleveland South Independence; Independence, Ohio		Michael Coleman, Sean McKeever, Eddy Newell, Walt Simonson, and Amy Tipton.
June 10–12, 2005	Embassy Suites; Independence, Ohio		Jamie McGonnigal, Peelander-Z, and Janice Williams.
June 2–4, 2006	Holiday Inn Cleveland South Independence; Independence, Ohio		Jamie McGonnigal.
June 15–17, 2007	Holiday Inn Cleveland South Independence; Independence, Ohio		Christine Auten, Chibi Jae, Entertainment System, Jamie McGonnigal, Stephanie Sheh, Michael Sinterniklaas, and The Spoony Bards.
June 26–29, 2008	Hilton Cleveland East / Beachwood; Beachwood, Ohio		Chibi Jae, Aaron Dismuke, Caitlin Glass, Vic Mignogna, and The OneUps.
June 4–7, 2009	Kalahari Resorts and Conventions Sandusky; Sandusky, Ohio		Laura Bailey, Chibi Jae, Aaron Dismuke, Melissa Fahn, Gavin Goszka, Chuck Huber, Vic Mignogna, Sonnya Paz, Michelle Ruff, Michael Sinterniklaas, Brad Swaile, Cristina Vee, and Travis Willingham.
June 3–6, 2010	Kalahari Resorts and Conventions Sandusky; Sandusky, Ohio		Chris Cason, Chibi Jae, Leah Clark, Aaron Dismuke, Todd Haberkorn, Vic Mignogna, Wendy Powell, and J. Michael Tatum.
June 2–5, 2011	Kalahari Resorts and Conventions Sandusky; Sandusky, Ohio	5,000 (est.)	Gavin Goszka, Todd Haberkorn, Cherami Leigh, Vic Mignogna, Lisa Ortiz, Mr. Raptor, and J. Michael Tatum.
June 7–10, 2012	Kalahari Resorts and Conventions Sandusky; Sandusky, Ohio		2D6, Christine Marie Cabanos, Samurai Dan Coglan, Quinton Flynn, Tiffany Grant, Todd Haberkorn, Vic Mignogna, Cassandra Lee Morris, Uncle Yo, Cristina Vee, and Greg Wicker.
June 6–9, 2013	Kalahari Resorts and Conventions Sandusky; Sandusky, Ohio		2D6, Joshua Adams, Samurai Dan Coglan, Jessica DiCicco, Carrie Keranen, Cassandra Lee, Mela Lee, Uke Li, Jamie Marchi, Vic Mignogna, Lisa Ortiz, Monica Rial, Christopher Sabat, Ian Sinclair, J. Michael Tatum, V is for Villains, Billy West, and Greg Wicker.
June 5–8, 2014	Kalahari Resorts and Conventions Sandusky; Sandusky, Ohio		2D6, Johnny Yong Bosch, Jessica Calvello, Chalk Twins, Jillian Coglan, Samurai Dan Coglan, Phil LaMarr, Cherami Leigh, Vic Mignogna, Lisa Ortiz, Bryce Papenbrook, Erica Schroeder, Patrick Seitz, Cree Summer, and Savana Wehunt.
June 4–7, 2015	Kalahari Resorts and Conventions Sandusky; Sandusky, Ohio	17,374	2D6, Steve Blum, Johnny Yong Bosch, Chalk Twins, Jennifer Cihi, Samurai Dan Coglan, Chuck Huber, Laugh Out Loud, Matthew Mercer, Shonen Knife, Symphonic Anime Orchestra, Eric Vale, and Lex Winter.
June 2–5, 2016	Kalahari Resorts and Conventions Sandusky; Sandusky, Ohio		2D6, Bruce Carr, Chalk Twins, Samurai Dan Coglan, Amber Lee Connors, Cosplay, Inc., Taylor Davis, Ben Diskin, Erika Harlacher, David Liebe Hart, Chuck Huber, Kazha, Vic Mignogna, Daman Mills, Cassandra Lee Morris, Laura Post, Professor Shyguy, Spike Spencer, Symphonic Anime Orchestra, Kaiji Tang, Jason Trost, and Nao Yazawa.
June 1–4, 2017	Kalahari Resorts and Conventions Sandusky; Sandusky, Ohio		Dante Basco, Johnny Yong Bosch, Jillian Coglan, Samurai Dan Coglan, Taylor Davis, Kara Eberle, Quinton Flynn, Ghost in Blue, Kid Yuki and the Otakus, E. Jason Liebrecht, Elizabeth Maxwell, Vic Mignogna, None Like Joshua, Professor Shyguy, Erica Schroeder, Super Guitar Bros., The Triforce Quartet, Lex Winter, and Nao Yazawa.
May 31 – June 3, 2018	Kalahari Resorts and Conventions Sandusky; Sandusky, Ohio		Steve Blum, Mica Burton, Ray Chase, Samurai Dan Coglan, Cynthia Cranz, Ghost in Blue, Kazha, Kid Yuki and the Otakus, The Manly Battleships, Kristen McGuire, Vic Mignogna, Max Mittelman, Chris Patton, Professor Shyguy, Chii Sakurabi, Super Guitar Bros., Jason Trost, David Vincent, and Lex Winter.
May 30 - June 2, 2019	Kalahari Resorts and Conventions Sandusky; Sandusky, Ohio		Tia Ballard, Mica Burton, Samurai Dan Coglan, Ghost in Blue, Todd Haberkorn, Natalie Rose Hoover, Jeremy Inman, Kazha, Lauren Landa, The Manly Battleships, Trina Nishimura, Show Us Your Pokeballs, and J. Michael Tatum.
June 2–6, 2021	Kalahari Resorts and Conventions Sandusky; Sandusky, Ohio		Morgan Berry, Dani Chambers, Samurai Dan Coglan, Cynthia Cranz, Ghost in Blue, Billy Kametz, Kazha, The Manly Battleships, and Professor Shyguy.
June 1–5, 2022	Kalahari Resorts and Conventions Sandusky; Sandusky, Ohio		Kira Buckland, Samurai Dan Coglan, Amber Lee Connors, Grey DeLisle Griffin, Ben Diskin, Ghost in Blue, Gavin Goszka, Kazha, The Manly Battleships, Faye Mata, Casey Mongillo, Cassandra Lee Morris, Kyle Phillips, Kiera Please, Professor Shyguy, Blythe Renay, and Kaiji Tang.
May 31 - June 4, 2023	Kalahari Resorts and Conventions Sandusky; Sandusky, Ohio		Adassa, Samurai Dan Coglan, The Cybertronic Spree, Robbie Daymond, Erik Estrada, Ghost in Blue, Kyle Hebert, Kazha, Brittany Lauda, The Manly Battleships, Eddie McClintock, Michaela Jill Murphy, Professor Shyguy, Matt Shipman, and John Swasey.
May 29 - June 2, 2024	Kalahari Resorts and Conventions Sandusky; Sandusky, Ohio		Bit Brigade, Samurai Dan Coglan, CutiePieSensei, Ricco Fajardo, Yaya Han, Erika Harlacher, Kazha, The Manly Battleships, Kyle McCarley, Lisa Ortiz, Professor Shyguy, Zeno Robinson, Andre "DJ Jinrei" Smith, Kirk Thornton, The Triforce Quartet, Patrick Warburton, and Chris "mc chris" Ward.
May 28 - June 1, 2025	Kalahari Resorts and Conventions Sandusky; Sandusky, Ohio		DJ Amaya, Bryn Apprill, Samurai Dan Coglan, Caitlin Glass, Kazha, The Manly Battleships, Elizabeth Maxwell, Brandon McInnis, Professor Shyguy, Nicolas Roye, J. Michael Tatum, The Triforce Quartet, David Vincent, and Suzie Yeung.
May 27–31, 2026	Kalahari Resorts and Conventions Sandusky; Sandusky, Ohio		Clifford Chapin, Samurai Dan Coglan, CutiePieSensei, Hayden Daviau, Yaya Han, Xanthe Huynh, Kazha, Mela Lee, Cherami Leigh, Likely Vain, The Manly Battleships, Kyle "Turtle Smithy" Mathis, Malinda "Malindachan" Mathis, Kristen McGuire, Sarah Natochenny, Professor Shyguy, The Triforce Quartet, and Joshua Waters.

== Fan Appreciation Party Weekend ==
Fan Appreciation Party Weekend was a two-day convention held during September at the Kalahari Resorts and Conventions Sandusky in Sandusky, Ohio.

=== Event history ===
Dates	Location	Atten.	Guests
September 11–12, 2015	Kalahari Resorts and Conventions Sandusky; Sandusky, Ohio		Jillian Coglan, Samurai Dan Coglan, and Amber Lee Connors.

== Colossalcon East ==
Colossalcon East is a four-day anime convention held during September at the Kalahari Resorts and Conventions Poconos in Pocono Manor, Pennsylvania. The convention is known for being located at a water park.

The space the convention used in 2018 was small and issues with cosplay in the water park occurred on Sunday. Colossalcon East 2020 was cancelled due to the COVID-19 pandemic.

=== Event history ===
Dates	Location	Atten.	Guests
September 8–10, 2017	Kalahari Resorts and Conventions Poconos; Pocono Manor, Pennsylvania		Dante Basco, Samurai Dan Coglan, Manly Battleships, Elizabeth Maxwell, Vic Mignogna, Erica Schroeder, The Triforce Quartet, Lex Winter, and Nao Yazawa.
September 7–9, 2018	Kalahari Resorts and Conventions Poconos; Pocono Manor, Pennsylvania		Morgan Berry, James Carter Cathcart, Samurai Dan Coglan, R. Bruce Elliott, Ghost in Blue, Todd Haberkorn, Xanthe Huynh, Michele Knotz, The Manly Battleships, Professor Shyguy, Super Guitar Bros., and Lex Winter.
September 13–15, 2019	Kalahari Resorts and Conventions Poconos; Pocono Manor, Pennsylvania		Ryan Bartley, Morgan Berry, Mica Burton, Bruce Carr, Samurai Dan Coglan, Kohei Hattori, Brianna Knickerbocker, The Manly Battleships, David Matranga, Kristen McGuire, Professor Shyguy, Alejandro Saab, Super Guitar Bros., TiA, and Cristina Vee.
September 17–19, 2021	Kalahari Resorts and Conventions Poconos; Pocono Manor, Pennsylvania		Jeannie Bolét, Kira Buckland, Samurai Dan Coglan, Jen Cohn, Chuck Huber, Kazha, The Manly Battleships, Jason Marsden, Professor Shyguy, Show Us Your Pokeballs, and Super Guitar Bros.
September 9–11, 2022	KKalahari Resorts and Conventions Poconos; Pocono Manor, Pennsylvania		Beau Billingslea, Steve Blum, Griffin Burns, Bruce Carr, Chalk Twins, Samurai Dan Coglan, Brittney Karbowski, Kazha, Melanie Kohn, The Manly Battleships, Kristen McGuire, Patricia Patts, and Professor Shyguy.
September 7–10, 2023	Kalahari Resorts and Conventions Poconos; Pocono Manor, Pennsylvania		Carlos Alazraqui, Samurai Dan Coglan, Grey DeLisle Griffin, Kohei Hattori, Caleb Hyles, Kazha, Emi Lo, The Manly Battleships, Robert McCollum, Erica Schroeder, and V is for Villains.
September 5–8, 2024	Kalahari Resorts and Conventions Poconos; Pocono Manor, Pennsylvania		DJ Amaya, Bit Brigade, Corina Boettger, Samurai Dan Coglan, Kellen Goff, Kazha, Emi Lo, The Manly Battleships, Landon McDonald, Professor Shyguy, Revolution Boi, Michelle Rojas, Jonah Scott, Karen Strassman, The Triforce Quartet, Vitamin H Productions, and Chris "mc chris" Ward.
September 4–7, 2025	Kalahari Resorts and Conventions Poconos; Pocono Manor, Pennsylvania		Bryson Baugus, Breathlessaire, Chalk Twins, Samurai Dan Coglan, Amber Lee Connors, CutiePieSensei, Dessi-Desu, Sandy Fox, Chris Hackne, Caleb Hyles, Kazha, Lex Lang, Likely Vain, The Manly Battleships, Vartan Sharkpuncher, The Triforce Quartet, Vitamin H Productions, and Jonathan Young.
September 10-13, 2026	Kalahari Resorts and Conventions Poconos; Pocono Manor, Pennsylvania		Breathlessaire, Kira Buckland, Chalk Twins, ChibiTifa, Samurai Dan Coglan, Brittney Karbowski, Kazha, Nola Klop, Lauren Landa, Likely Vain, The Manly Battleships, Michelle Rojas, Jad Saxton, Vartan Sharkpuncher, The Triforce Quartet, Vitamin H Productions, and WildSpice.

== ColossalCon Cruise ==
Colossalcon Cruise is a three-day cruise held during February/March on Royal Caribbean ships that sail from Port Canaveral, Florida.

=== Event history ===
Dates	Location	Atten.	Guests
January 25–28, 2019	Royal Caribbean Enchantment of the Seas; Sailing from Cape Canaveral, Florida		
January 24–27, 2020	Royal Caribbean Mariner of the Seas; Sailing from Cape Canaveral, Florida		
February 24–27, 2023	Royal Caribbean Independence of the Seas; Sailing from Cape Canaveral, Florida		
February 27 - March 3, 2025	Royal Caribbean's Voyager of the Seas; Sailing from Cape Canaveral, Florida		
February 12–16, 2026	Royal Caribbean's Explorer of the Seas; Sailing from Port Canaveral, Florida		

== Colossalcon Texas ==
Colossalcon Texas is a three-day convention held during August at the Kalahari Resorts and Conventions Round Rock in Round Rock, Texas.

=== Event history ===
Dates	Location	Atten.	Guests
November 19–21, 2021	Kalahari Resorts and Conventions Round Rock; Round Rock, Texas		Dante Basco, Dani Chambers, Samurai Dan Coglan, Caitlin Glass, Kazha, The Manly Battleships, Brian Mathis, Kristen McGuire, and Kaiji Tang.
August 19–21, 2022	Kalahari Resorts and Conventions Round Rock; Round Rock, Texas		Jessica Cavanagh, Samurai Dan Coglan, Aaron Dismuke, Cole Feuchter, Erica Lindbeck, The Manly Battleships, Mega Ran, Wendy Powell, Professor Shyguy, Blythe Renay, V is for Villains, Kiba Walker, and Barry Yandell.
August 18–20, 2023	Kalahari Resorts and Conventions Round Rock; Round Rock, Texas		Samurai Dan Coglan, Kazha, Wendee Lee, The Manly Battleships, Kristen McGuire, Kayli Mills, Keith Silverstein, Jeannie Tirado, V is for Villains, and Gareth West.
August 16–18, 2024	Kalahari Resorts and Conventions Round Rock; Round Rock, Texas		Steve Blum, Samurai Dan Coglan, Hayden Daviau, Melissa Fahn, Caleb Hyles, Kazha, The Manly Battleships, Mary Elizabeth McGlynn, Nerds Know, Mallorie Rodak, and Alejandro Saab.
August 15–17, 2025	Kalahari Resorts and Conventions Round Rock; Round Rock, Texas		Samurai Dan Coglan, CutiePieSensei, The Geeky Seamstress, John Gremillion, Kazha, Mela Lee, Likely Vain, David Lodge, The Manly Battleships, Dave B. Mitchell, Mystery Skulls, PAiDA, Laura Post, Professor Shyguy, William Salyers, and Jenny Yokobori.
August 21-23, 2026	Kalahari Resorts and Conventions Round Rock; Round Rock, Texas		Christine Marie Cabanos, Chalk Twins, Leah Clark, Samurai Dan Coglan, CutiePieSensei, Chris Guerrero, Kazha, The Manly Battleships, Zeno Robinson, Alexis Tipton, and Caleb Yen.

== Colossalcon North ==
Colossalcon North is a three-day convention held during November at the Kalahari Resort and Convention Center Wisconsin Dells in Wisconsin Dells, Wisconsin.

=== Event history ===
Dates	Location	Atten.	Guests
November 18–20, 2022	Kalahari Resort and Convention Center Wisconsin Dells; Wisconsin Dells, Wisconsin		Samurai Dan Coglan, Jarrod Greene, Kazha, Lauren Landa, The Manly Battleships, Marcus M. Mauldin, Cassandra Lee Morris, Dallas Reid, John Swasey, V is for Villains, and Tyler Walker.
November 17–19, 2023	Kalahari Resort and Convention Center Wisconsin Dells; Wisconsin Dells, Wisconsin		Samurai Dan Coglan, Ben Diskin, Aaron Dismuke, Kazha, Knight of the Round, Erica Lindbeck, The Manly Battleships, Kristen McGuire, Andre "DJ Jinrei" Smith, Spirit Bomb, and Sarah Wiedenheft.
November 22–24, 2024	Kalahari Resort and Convention Center Wisconsin Dells; Wisconsin Dells, Wisconsin		Allegra Clark, Samurai Dan Coglan, Caleb Hyles, Kazha, The Manly Battleships, Adam McArthur, Xander Mobus, Nerds Know, Revolution Boi, Zeno Robinson, Kaiji Tang, Chris "mc chris" Ward, Anne Yatco, and Jonathan Young.
November 21–23, 2025	Kalahari Resort and Convention Center Wisconsin Dells; Wisconsin Dells, Wisconsin		DJ Amaya, Tia Ballard, Chalk Twins, SungWon Cho, Samurai Dan Coglan, Heartless Aquarius, Kazha, Likely Vain, The Manly Battleships, Faye Mata, Kyle "Turtle Smithy" Mathis, Malinda "Malindachan" Mathis, Joel McDonald, Madeleine Morris, Jamieson Price, Professor Shyguy, and Super Thrash Bros.
November 20-22, 2026	Kalahari Resort and Convention Center Wisconsin Dells; Wisconsin Dells, Wisconsin		DJ Amaya, Laila Berzins, Paul Castro Jr., Chalk Twins, Samurai Dan Coglan, Hayden Daviau, Kazha, and The Manly Battleships.

== Colossalcon Virginia ==
Colossalcon Virginia is a three-day convention held during May at the Kalahari Resorts & Conventions - Spotsylvania County in Woodford, Virginia.

=== Event history ===
Dates	Location	Atten.	Guests
May 7-9, 2027	Kalahari Resorts & Conventions - Spotsylvania County; Woodford, Virginia		Xanthe Huynh and Keith Silverstein.
