= Bible bee =

Bible bee may refer to:

- National Bible Bee
- Any organization that sponsors a Bible quiz
