= Kalahari Resorts and Conventions Poconos =

Resort in Pocono Manor, Pennsylvania, United States

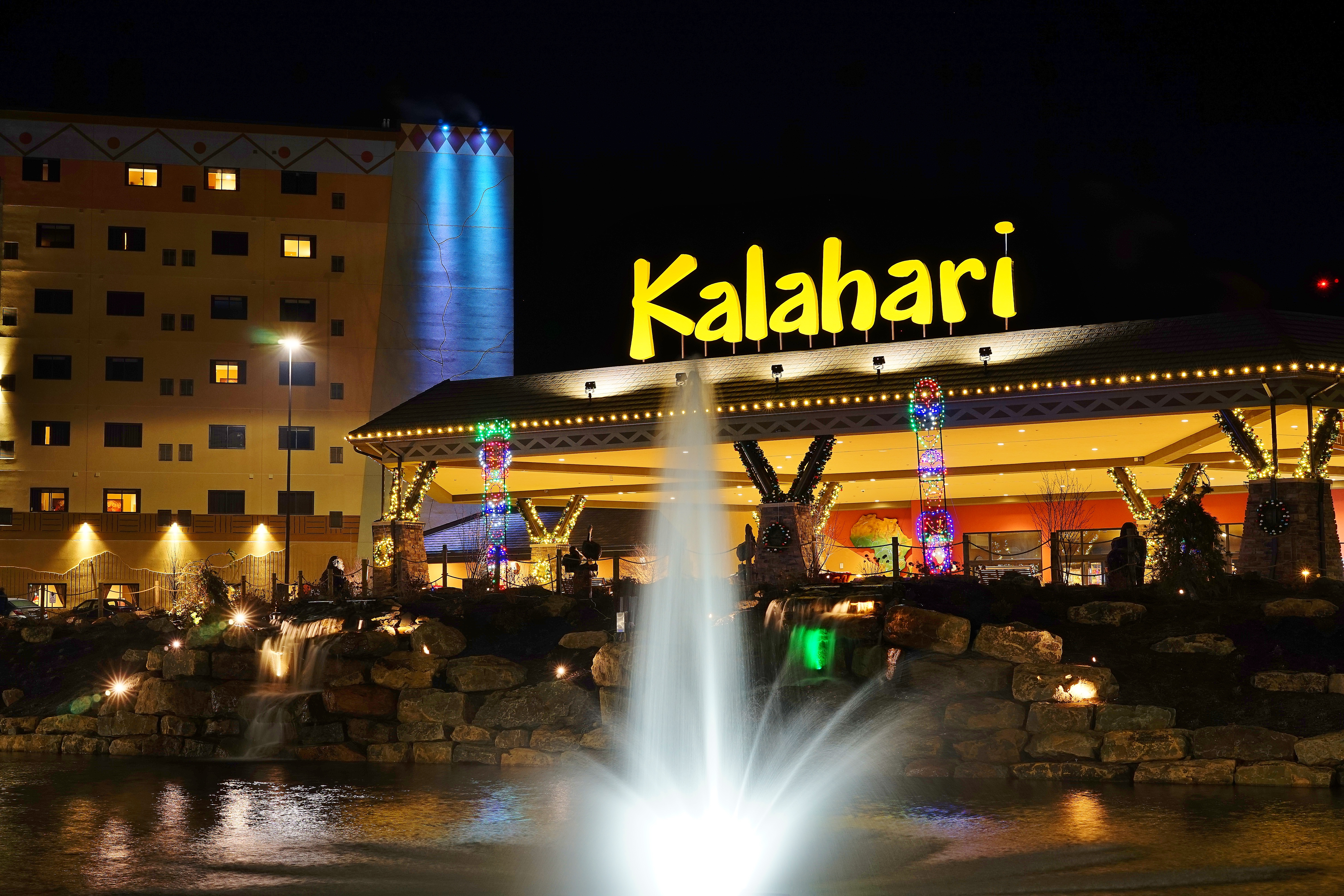
- Interactive map of Kalahari Resorts and Conventions Poconos
- Address: 250 Kalahari Blvd
- Location: Pocono Manor, Pennsylvania
- Coordinates: 41.098621°N 75.390042°W
- Owner: Kalahari Resorts
- Type: Convention center, Resort hotel

Construction
- Groundbreaking: October 1, 2013
- Opened: July 1, 2015
- Expanded: 2017, 2018, 2019

Website
- Official website

Kalahari Resorts and Conventions Poconos is a water park, resort hotel, and convention center located in Pocono Manor, Pennsylvania. The resort broke ground on October 1, 2013, with several executives from the Kalahari Resorts chain along with Pennsylvania state governor Tom Corbett in attendance. The resort opened on July 1, 2015, and features 220,000-square-foot (20,000 m^{2}) indoor water park, a smaller outdoor waterpark, 230,000-square-foot (21,000 m^{2}) convention center, 977 guest rooms, and a 40,000-square-foot (3,700 m^{2}) arcade and entertainment center.

Then, in 2017, Kalahari Poconos expanded its water park and resort, and the water park became the largest indoor theme park in the United States.
