= Kalahari Resorts and Conventions Round Rock =

Entertainment complex in Texas, United States

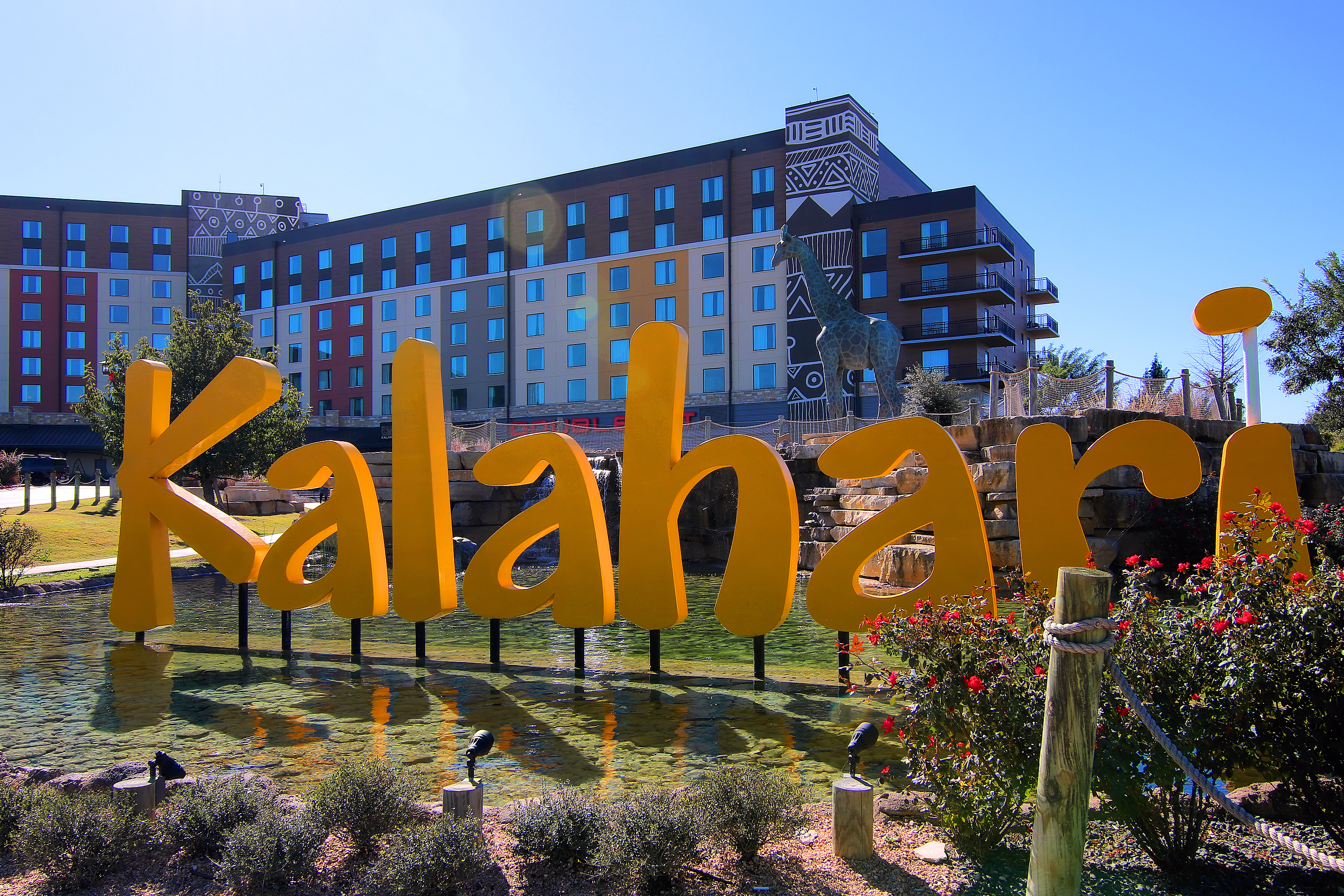
- the Kalahari Resort Hotel in Round Rock, Texas
- Interactive map of Kalahari Resorts and Conventions Round Rock
- Address: 3001 Kalahari Blvd
- Location: Round Rock, Texas
- Coordinates: 30.518027°N 97.634838°W
- Owner: Kalahari Resorts
- Type: Convention center, Resort hotel

Construction
- Groundbreaking: May 15, 2018
- Opened: November 12, 2020
- Cost: $550 million

Website
- Official website

Kalahari Resorts and Conventions Round Rock is a water park, resort hotel, and convention center located in Round Rock, Texas. The resort's construction was announced in June 2016 with the ground being broken on May 15, 2018 with Round Rock mayor Craig Morgan in attendance. The resort opened on November 12, 2020 with a 223,000-square-foot (20,700 m^{2}) indoor water park, a 220,000-square-foot (20,000 m^{2}) convention center, an 80,000-square-foot (7,400 m^{2}) Tom Foolery’s Adventure Park, 3 acres of outdoor pools, and 975 hotel rooms. The resort is also the first Kalahari resort to be located in a metropolitan area instead of a resort town. When explaining the decision the manager stated that "Round Rock has been one of the fastest-growing cities in the country and we took notice of that and as we started to look at our next development, it made sense we go south and what better place than the great state of Texas".

On March 21, 2022, an EF2 tornado passed by the resort, however, there was no reported major damage other than a gas leak.
