= Grandeur of the Seas =

Vision-class cruise ship

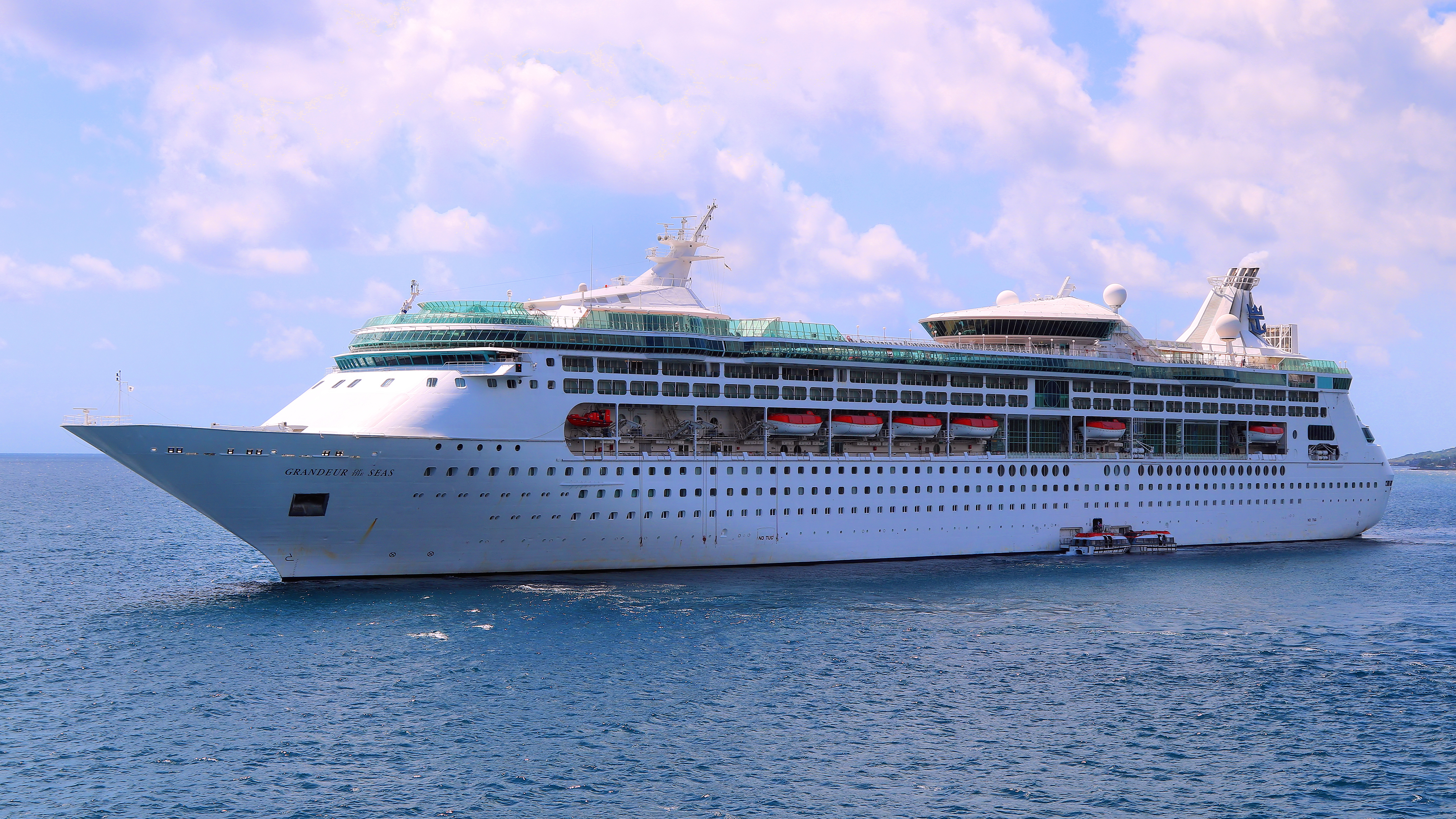
- Grandeur of the Seas docked at Roatán, Honduras on 25 February 2026

History

Bahamas
- Name: Grandeur of the Seas
- Owner: Grandeur of The Seas Inc.
- Operator: Royal Caribbean International
- Port of registry: 1996–2001: Monrovia, Liberia; 2001–: Nassau, Bahamas
- Route: Caribbean
- Ordered: 14 February 1992
- Builder: Kværner Masa-Yards Hietalahti shipyard, Helsinki, Finland
- Cost: $280 million
- Yard number: 492
- Laid down: 6 June 1995
- Launched: 1 March 1996
- Christened: 13 December 1996
- Completed: 20 November 1996
- Acquired: 14 December 1996
- Maiden voyage: 14 December 1996
- In service: 1996–present
- Refit: May 2012
- Home port: Colon, Panama; Cartagena, Colombia; San Juan, Puerto Rico
- Identification: Call sign C6SE3; IMO number: 9102978; MMSI number: 311315000; DNV ID: 18515
- Nickname(s): Lady G
- Status: In service

General characteristics
- Class & type: Vision-class cruise ship
- Tonnage: 73,817 GT; 44,122 NT; 7,000 DWT
- Length: 279 m (915 ft 4 in)
- Beam: 32.2 m (105 ft 8 in) (waterline); 36 m (118 ft 1 in) (maximum)
- Height: 59 m (193 ft 7 in)
- Draught: 8.30 m (27 ft 3 in)
- Depth: 15.85 m (52 ft 0 in)
- Decks: 14
- Installed power: 4 × MAN B&W 12V48/60
- Propulsion: Diesel-electric; two shafts; Fixed pitch propellers
- Speed: 22 knots (41 km/h; 25 mph)
- Capacity: 2,446 (maximum occupancy); 1,992 (double occupancy)
- Crew: 760
- Notes: Nicknamed “Lady G”

Grandeur of the Seas is a Vision-class cruise ship owned and operated by Royal Caribbean International. Features include a full-service spa, six whirlpools, an outdoor jogging track and a number of bars and restaurants. It was announced on 16 October 2019 that Grandeur of the Seas would be transferred in the second quarter of 2021 to Pullmantur Cruises, in which Royal Caribbean had a 49% stake in at the time. These plans were cancelled in mid-2020. It is currently the oldest and smallest ship still operating for Royal Caribbean.

== Features ==
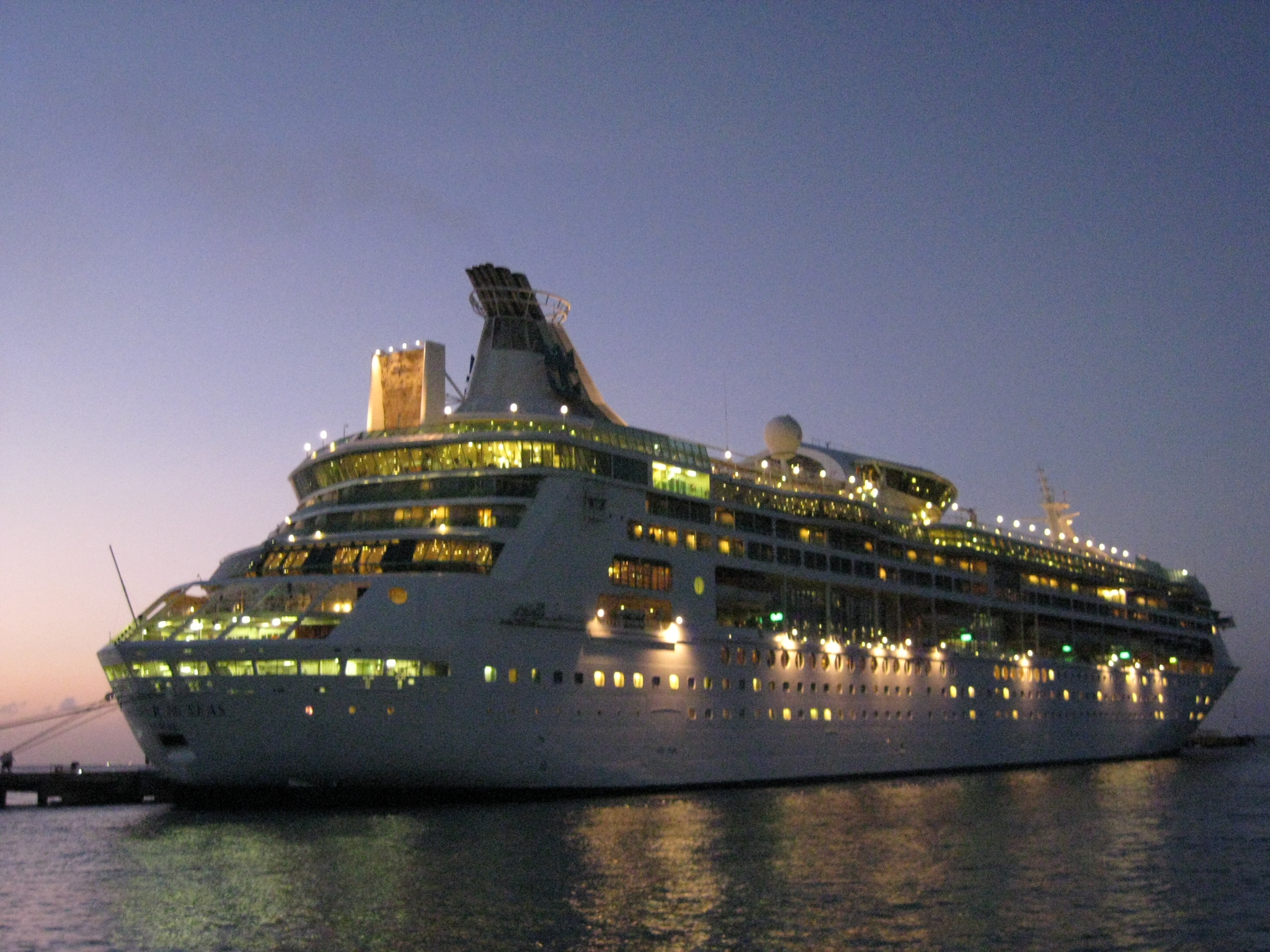
Grandeur of the Seas ported at Cozumel, Mexico, at dusk.

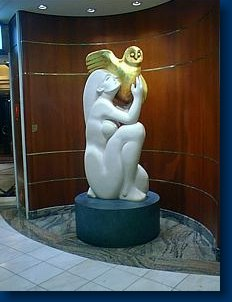
Sculpture of Goddess Athena and the Owl on board Grandeur of the Seas by Laurence Broderick

Grandeur of the Seas features an on-board casino, Casino Royale, on Deck 5. The casino has many slot machines, variations of poker, craps, blackjack, and a bar. There are also eight themed bars and lounges, including the pool deck bar, South Pacific Lounge, Schooner, The Viking Lounge, and several unnamed areas. There is an open atrium, called the Centrum, that stretches from deck 4 to deck 10. An outdoor pool is found on the top open deck (deck 9) along with 4 whirlpool areas, 2 on the starboard side and 2 on the port side. Next to the pool is the Solarium area with a pool and 2 whirlpools, 1 on the starboard side and 1 on the port side. There is a jogging track on deck 10. Several youth facilities are scattered about the ship, including an arcade area, a teen nightclub, and the Explorations desk on deck 5. A special edition of The Compass called Explorations is published specifically for children. The Spa and Fitness Center can be found on deck 9. The main dining area, the Great Gatsby, is located on decks 4 and 5. Guests are seated in two shifts on deck four of the main dining (5:30 pm ship's time) and 8:00 pm (ship's time) or anytime in my time dining from 5:00–8:30 PM (ship's time) on deck 5. The shows in The Palladium (the main theater, found on decks 5 and 6), are designed around the dining room times. The ship also contains a conference center, a library with an honor checkout system and a buffet called The Windjammer Market Place, 2 shuffle board courts, a rock wall with areas for climbers of various skills, a photo shop, several stores specializing on jewelry, souvenirs, cigars, cigarettes, and liquor, and a piano area.

== Ports of call ==
Grandeur of the Seas was initially deployed on 7 night cruises from Miami, Florida, to the Eastern Caribbean from 1996 to 2000, when Explorer of the Seas was launched and took over Grandeur of the Seas's itinerary. Since 2000, Grandeur of the Seas has been deployed in Europe as well as back in the Caribbean homeported in cities such as Tampa, Ft. Lauderdale, and New Orleans. Summers have been spent in Eastern US ports such as Norfolk, Virginia; Baltimore, Maryland and Philadelphia, Pennsylvania, visiting the Caribbean, Bermuda and the North East of the US and Canadian Maritimes.

Grandeur of the Seas was based out of Panama in the winter of 2010/2011, replacing her sister ship, Enchantment of the Seas. In 2013, Grandeur of the Seas replaced Enchantment of the Seas out of Baltimore when Enchantment of the Seas moved to Port Canaveral. As of March 2020, the ship offers cruises to Bermuda and the southeast US coast, the Bahamas, and the Southern Caribbean, all departing from Baltimore, Maryland.

On 28 July 2021, Royal Caribbean announced that Grandeur of the Sea would homeport out of Bridgetown, Barbados for the winter 2021–2022 season, visiting southern Caribbean destinations on "island hopping" cruises.

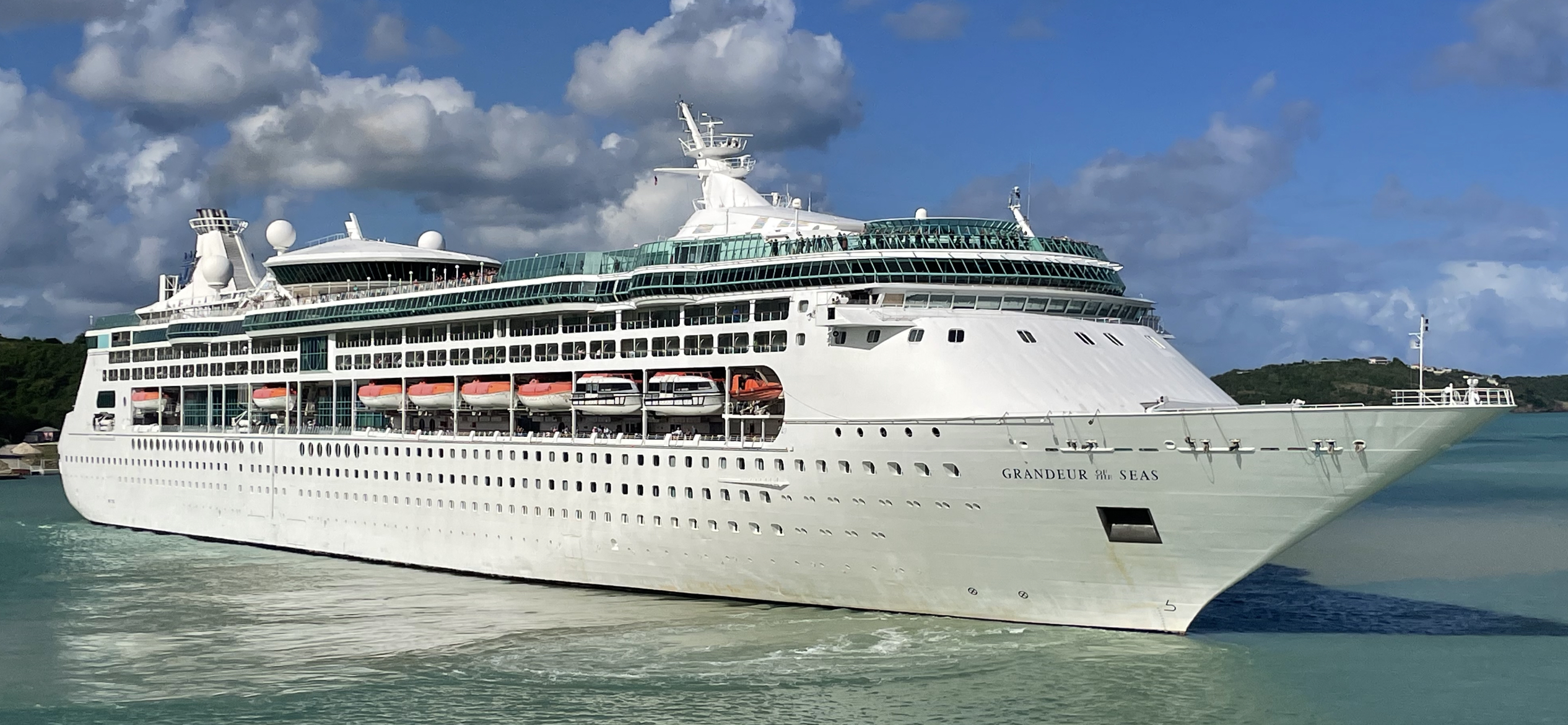
Grandeur of the Seas at Antigua on 29 February 2024

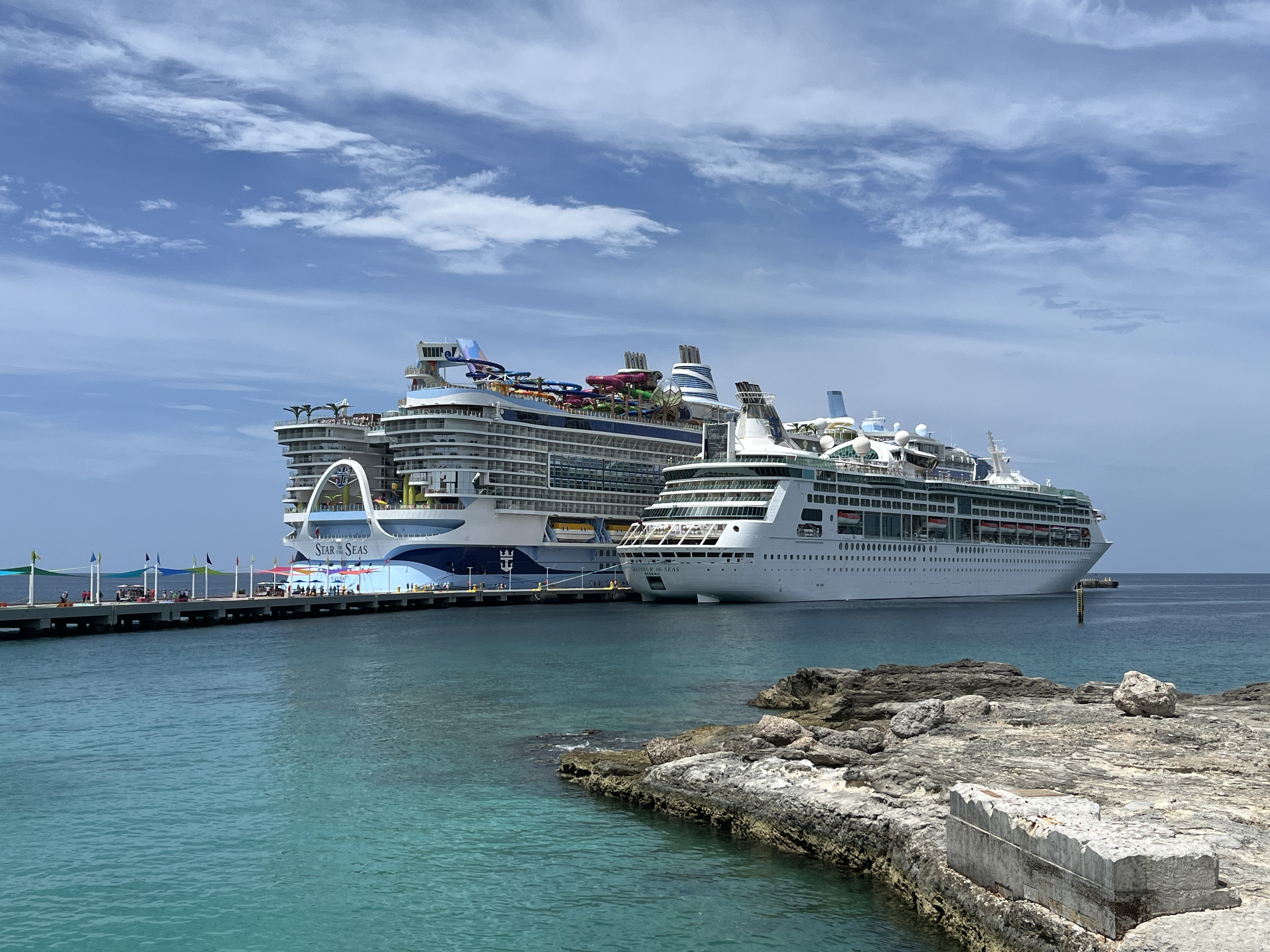
Grandeur of the Seas (right) docked with Star of the Seas at CocoCay, The Bahamas, 25 August 2025

== Incidents and accidents ==
=== Power loss ===
On 31 October 2000, Grandeur of the Seas lost power for 5.5 hours with power to lighting, plumbing and air conditioning restored by 10:45 a.m. The ship was towed to Willemstad, Curaçao where repairs were made and got back underway 12 hours late.

=== Dock collision ===
On 20 April 2005, while docking in Costa Maya, Mexico, a 42 ft (13 m) long hole was torn in the hull of the ship. The hole was located on deck one of the ship approximately 5 ft (1.5 m) above the waterline and 5 ft (1.5 m) wide at its widest. The company said that 15-knot (28 km/h; 17 mph) winds and a 3-knot (5.6 km/h; 3.5 mph) current contributed to the accident. The next seven-day cruise was shortened to five as the ship had to remain in Costa Maya an extra 2 days awaiting materials to patch the hole. Royal Caribbean offered guests transportation back to New Orleans or onboard credit if they chose to stay with the ship. The ship was later dry docked and the damage was repaired.

=== Hurricane Wilma ===
On 23 October 2005, the Grandeur of the Seas left Baltimore heading for Bermuda. Hurricane Wilma was moving in the Atlantic and joined with Tropical Storm Alpha to create a major storm. The storm picked up speed and the Grandeur of the Seas was caught in the hurricane. The ship experienced extreme sea conditions and sustained damage on Deck 2 where windows were blown out and the deck was flooded. Passengers stayed in their cabins during the intense part of the storm as it was impossible to navigate the halls or stairs and the elevators were disabled for safety. There were reports of damage in the restaurants, lounges, and bars with displaced furniture, broken fixtures and dishware. When the sea calmed, the ship sat stationary while sick or injured passengers were air lifted off the ship. No deaths were reported. The ship lost a day at port in Bermuda due to the storm. Repairs began immediately refitting windows and drying out wet cabins and hallways on Deck 2. Some shaken passengers deboarded in Bermuda and did not return to the ship finding flights home to Baltimore.

=== Ship-board fire ===
On 27 May 2013 at 2:50 am EDT, a fire broke out on the third deck of Grandeur of the Seas. The fire was extinguished within three hours, and major damage was limited to the aftmost sections of decks 3, 4, and 5. As a precaution, all passengers were required to report to evacuation locations for several hours. No evacuation was necessary, and the ship was able to continue under her own power to the Bahamas. The remainder of the cruise was canceled and passengers were flown back to their point of origin from Freeport, Bahamas.

=== Capsized lifeboat ===
On 16 January 2017, a lifeboat fell off Grandeur of the Seas while it was docked in Charleston as part of a 10-day Bahamas cruise. The fall wire of the lifeboat was undergoing scheduled maintenance and the wire slipped during retrieval, causing the lifeboat to fall into the water. The lifeboat subsequently capsized. No injuries were reported and the cruise was not delayed after Royal Caribbean consulted with the US Coast Guard.

=== Mechanical issues ===
In the early hours of 9 January 2018, Grandeur of the Seas experienced a loss of port side steering while on its way from Nassau, Bahamas to Baltimore, Maryland. The ship was able to travel safely, and turned around towards Freeport, Bahamas, but arrived in Port Canaveral on 10 January 2018. The detour and repair work ultimately added 2 nights to the 9-night cruise, with the ship arriving back in Baltimore on 13 January 2018 instead of the originally planned 11 January 2018. As a result, the subsequent cruise was shortened by two nights.

=== Coronavirus quarantine ===
On 12 March 2020, Grandeur of the Seas was denied a request to berth at the Austin "Babe" Monsanto Marine Terminal in the United States Virgin Islands because a crew member had travelled to Japan within the previous two weeks, even though no confirmed cases of COVID-19 were on board. However, the ship was eventually allowed to return to transport a seriously injured passenger to a hospital for treatment.
