= National Bible Bee =

Bible contest and its organization

- Headquarters: San Antonio, TX
- Region served: United States
- Parent organization: The Shelby Kennedy Foundation
- Website: biblebee.org

The National Bible Bee is a Bible contest held for the first time in 2009 by the Shelby Kennedy Foundation. The competition starts with local contests across the United States. The top 120 contestants from the Primary, ages 7–10; Junior, ages 11–14; and Senior, ages 15–18 divisions advance to the National level. The top 120 contestants are decided by a test that is based on the study passage the contestants studied during the summer. The first national competition was held in Washington, D.C., on November 5–6, 2009. More than $100,000 in prize money is awarded each year.

== Origins and philosophy ==
The National Bible Bee is sponsored by the Shelby Kennedy Foundation. Shelby Kennedy, who died of cancer at the age of 23, spent her life studying the Bible; after her death, the Shelby Kennedy Foundation was established as a non-profit in her name to encourage children and youth to memorize Scripture.

The National Bible Bee promises large cash prizes for five of the top-place finalists, as well as prizes for tenth to fifteenth place. Both the local and national competition involve oral and written tests. The goal of the Bible Bee is to encourage young people in the Christian faith, by becoming more Biblically literate. Their vision is "To know God's Word and make Him known."

== Competition ==
The competition is divided into local and national levels. From 2009 to 2014, the local competition was not administered directly by the Shelby Kennedy Foundation, but rather by separate entities known as Hosts. Though these groups were not legally related to the Shelby Kennedy Foundation, they were the only source of finalists for the national competition. At the local competition, the contestants were required to take a written test and an oral test. From 2015 and on, the orals test was taken off, and the written test was replaced with an online test on Classmarker. The Hosts remained, but they acted as supporter of the competition rather than direct administrators of the competition. At the end of the local competition, the total scores were compiled and the highest-scoring contestants in each age category proceed to the national competition.

In 2009, National Bible Bee was held at the J.W. Marriott Hotel in Washington, D.C. The 2010 competition was held at the Marriott Renaissance Hotel and Conference Center in Schaumburg, Illinois. The 2011 National Bible Bee was held in Nashville, Tennessee, and the 2012 and 2013 National Bible Bee was held at the Wilderness Stone Hill Lodge and Sevierville Events Center in Sevierville, Tennessee.

The 2014 National Bible Bee competition was held in Orlando, Florida at the Hilton Orlando Lake Buena Vista. It was announced in the spring of 2015 that the National competitions of 2015, 2016, and 2017 would be held at the J.W. Marriott San Antonio Hill Country Resort & Spa in San Antonio, TX. The 2018 National Competition was held at Oak Hills Church in San Antonio, December 3–7.

The 2019 and 2021 National Competitions were held at the Northern Kentucky Convention Center, in Covington, Kentucky, November 18–21. The 2019 final rounds were held at the Ark Encounter Answer Center. Due to the COVID-19 pandemic in 2020, the preliminary rounds of NBBC were online, and the Semi-Finals and Finals were held again in San Antonio, Texas on November 8-10, 2020. In 2021 the competition was hosted yet again and the Northern Kentucky Convention Center in Covington, Kentucky, November 7-10. The Semi-Final and Final rounds were also held at the Northern Kentucky Convention Center. In 2022 the competition was held at the Central Bank Center. The 2023 competition was held at Ridgecrest Conference Center. The 2024 competition was planned to be held at Ridgecrest again, but due to damage from Hurricane Helene, it was instead held at the Hyatt Regency in Orlando, Florida.

In 2025 and 2026, the National Competitions were held at Kalahari Resorts and Conventions in Sandusky, Ohio.

=== Eligibility ===
Eligibility for the National Bible Bee Competition is restricted to United States citizens, including residents of the District of Columbia and children of U.S. Armed Forces personnel stationed overseas. Non-legal residents may compete on the local level but may not advance to the National competition. Close relatives of the Shelby Kennedy Foundation members or others who have worked on the contest content are allowed to compete; however, they may not win prize money at the National Bible Bee Competition.

Contestants are divided into three age divisions: Beginner: ages 4-6 (not eligible for the National Competition), Primary: ages 7–10, Junior: ages 11–14, and Senior: ages 15–18. Ages are based on the contestant's age on November 13 of the year of the competition.

=== Study materials ===
The Bible Bee's competition material includes both memory work and an in-depth study on a selected book or portion of the Bible.

Contestants are required to memorize a number of verses. In the preliminary oral round, the contestants must recite the passages they are asked word-for-word from any of five approved English versions (NIV, KJV, NKJV, NASB, or ESV). Scores are given based on the accuracy of the contestant's recitation. In addition, comprehension of the memory verses is tested in a multiple-choice computer-based test.

=== Competition History ===
Year	Theme	Textbook	Summer Study Passage	National Competition Study Passage		
Year	Theme	Textbook	Summer Study Passage	Primary Division	Junior Division	Senior Division
2009	None	None	Genesis, 1 & 2 Samuel, Matthew, Acts, and Romans			
2010	None	Sword Study	Colossians			
2011	None	Sword Study	1 Peter	2 Peter		
2012	None	Sword Study	2 Timothy	1 Timothy		
2013	None	Sword Study	1 John	Ephesians		
2014	None	Sword Study	Jonah	Nahum		
2015	Believe	Study Guide	John 1-6	John 7-12		
2016	Abide	Discovery Journal	John 13-15	1 John		
2017	Created	Discovery Journal	Genesis 1-3	Colossians		
2018	Thrive	Discovery Journal	James	Philippians		
2019	Worship	Discovery Journal	Psalms	1 Peter		
2020	Trust	Discovery Journal	Genesis 37-50	John 16-21		
2021	Witness	Discovery Journal	Acts 1-11	Acts 12-18	Acts 12-20	Acts 12-28
2022	Redeemed	Discovery Journal	Ruth	Isaiah 40-44	Isaiah 40-46	Isaiah 40-48
2023	Believe	Discovery Journal	John 1-6	Romans 1-8		
2024	Truth	Discovery Journal	John 12-17; 20	Daniel 1-6		
2025	Created	Discovery Journal	Genesis 1-5	Ephesians		
2026	Thrive	Discovery Journal	James	Matthew 5-7, Proverbs 3	Matthew 5-7, Proverbs 3-4	

=== Competition format ===
Semifinals format
The 120 highest-ranking contestants from each age division are chosen to compete at the national competition in the fall. All contestants participate in a preliminary round featuring both a written exam and an oral recitation round. In early competitions, the semi-finals featured the top 15 contestants from each age division competing in a sudden-elimination recitation format for five spots in the final challenge round. Perfect recitations often led to very long competitions, so in 2020 the format for semi-finals was changed. In the first round, a recitation round, points were deducted for each error made in recitation, and at the end of the round, the contestants with the two lowest scores were eliminated. The second round was a sudden-elimination recitation round as in previous years. The third round featured multiple-choice Bible knowledge questions for the contestants to answer onstage with a handheld device, known as the "clicker", and the fourth round was a sudden-elimination recitation round as well.

Finals format
The format for finals changed from the format used in previous years. Round 1 features each of the 5 finalists reciting a passage from memory, with points deducted for errors. The maximum points for round 1 was 1,000 points. Rounds 2-4 situate contestants on gameshow podiums. Round 2 is an open-ended/multiple-choice Bible knowledge questions where contestants are given 20 seconds to write their answer on an iPad tablet. Round 3 is a buzzer recitation round, where contestants buzz in to answer bible knowledge questions whose answers are in the form of a Bible passage. If they answer correctly, they must recite the passage with minimal errors to accumulate score. Round 4 is a 15 question lightning round, where contestants buzz in to answer bible knowledge questions. Round 5 again required contestants to recite a passage from memory worth 1,000 points. The winners are determined by their cumulative scores from all 5 rounds. Ties were broken by using the contestant's scores from the preliminary round at the national competition.

== 2020 COVID-19 Pandemic Response ==
Due to the COVID-19 pandemic, the National Bible Bee was forced to make some necessary modifications to the competition. On July 3, 2020, they announced that the preliminary rounds of NBBC would be held online. All 120 qualifiers in each age division would take an online test on ClassMarker on October 12. The top 33% (40 contestants) from that would then go on to compete in Oral Recitation Rounds on October 15. The top 15 scorers from these 2 rounds (the scores were combined) went on to the Semi-Finals which was held in San Antonio on November 8-10.
