= Sherwood Shores, Texas =

- Census-designated place
- Location within Texas Location within the United States
- Coordinates: 33°50′52″N 96°48′53″W
- Country: United States
- State: Texas
- County: Grayson

Area
  - Total: 4.041 sq mi (10.47 km^{2})
  - Land: 2.849 sq mi (7.38 km^{2})
  - Water: 1.192 sq mi (3.09 km^{2})
- Elevation: 682 ft (208 m)

Population (2010)
  - Total: 1,190
  - Density: 417.7/sq mi (161.3/km^{2})
- Time zone: UTC-6 (Central (CST))
  - Summer (DST): UTC-5 (CDT)
- Area code: 940
- GNIS feature ID: 2586990

Sherwood Shores is an unincorporated community and census-designated place in Grayson County, Texas, United States. As of the 2020 census, Sherwood Shores had a population of 1,165. The community is located on the Red River, which forms the state line with Oklahoma.

== Tornadoes ==
.On March 21, 2022, an EF2 tornado struck the town, causing heavy damage, killing one person and injuring 11.

== Geography ==
According to the U.S. Census Bureau, the community has an area of 4.041 square miles (10.47 km^{2}); 2.849 square miles (7.38 km^{2}) of its area is land, and 1.192 square miles (3.09 km^{2}) is water.

== Demographics ==
Historical population
Census	Pop.	Note	%±
2010	1,190		—
2020	1,165		−2.1%
U.S. Decennial Census; 1850–1900 1910; 1920 1930 1940; 1950 1960 1970; 1980 1990 2000; 2010 2020

Sherwood Shores first appeared as a census designated place in the 2010 U.S. census.

Sherwood Shores CDP, Texas – Racial and ethnic composition Note: the US Census treats Hispanic/Latino as an ethnic category. This table excludes Latinos from the racial categories and assigns them to a separate category. Hispanics/Latinos may be of any race.
Race / Ethnicity (NH = Non-Hispanic)	Pop 2010	Pop 2020	% 2010	% 2020
White alone (NH)	1,094	1,022	91.93%	87.73%
Black or African American alone (NH)	7	3	0.59%	0.26%
Native American or Alaska Native alone (NH)	26	35	2.18%	3.00%
Asian alone (NH)	0	1	0.00%	0.09%
Pacific Islander alone (NH)	0	0	0.00%	0.00%
Other race alone (NH)	1	0	0.08%	0.00%
Mixed race or Multiracial (NH)	23	48	1.93%	4.12%
Hispanic or Latino (any race)	39	56	3.28%	4.81%
Total	1,190	1,165	100.00%	100.00%

As of the 2020 United States census, there were 1,165 people, 400 households, and 184 families residing in the CDP.
