= Kalahari Resorts and Conventions Sandusky =

Water park in Sandusky, Ohio, US

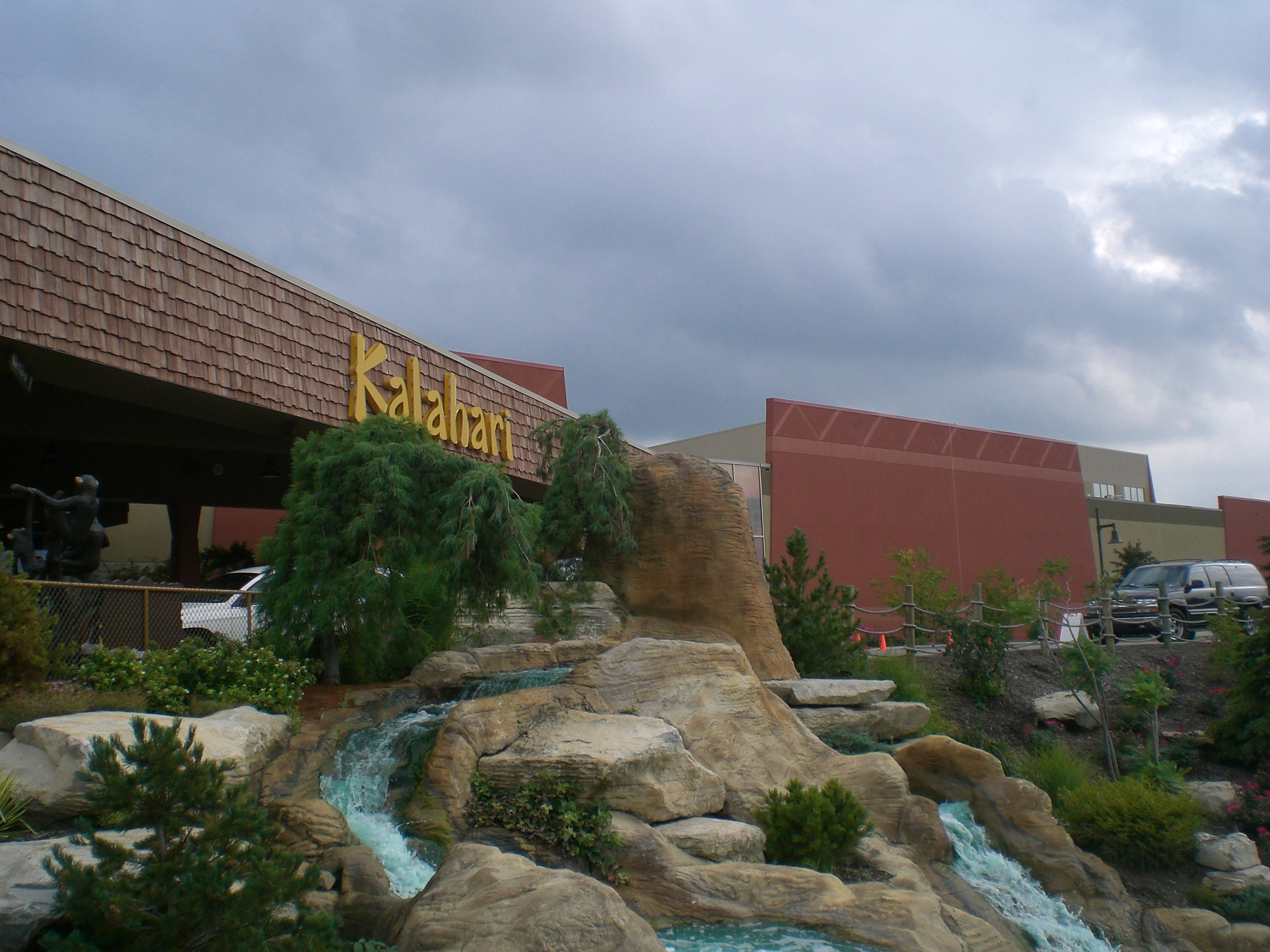
- The outside of the Kalahari resort in Sandusky, Ohio
- Interactive map of Kalahari Resorts and Conventions Sandusky
- Address: 7000 Kalahari Drive
- Location: Sandusky, Ohio
- Coordinates: 41.382750°N 82.643977°W
- Owner: Kalahari Resorts
- Type: Convention center, Resort hotel
- Public transit: Sandusky Transit System: Blue Line

Construction
- Opened: May 20, 2005
- Expanded: 2006, 2012

Website
- Official website

Kalahari Resorts and Conventions Sandusky is a water park, resort hotel, and convention center located in Sandusky, Ohio. Named for the Kalahari Desert in southern Africa, the resort is second hotel for the Kalahari Resorts chain. The resort opened on May 20, 2005 and currently houses 884 guest rooms, making it the largest hotel in the state of Ohio by guest rooms.

When the water park opened, it was 80,000 square feet (7,400 m^{2}) before expanding in 2008 by 93,000 square feet (8,600 m^{2}), making it the largest indoor water park in the United States at the time with 173,000 square feet (16,100 m^{2}). The water park also features a FoilTec roof system that lets in natural light.

The convention center opened in August 2006 with 100,000 square feet (9,300 m^{2}) of event space and was later expanded to 215,000 square feet (20,000 m^{2}) in 2012.

The outdoor water park and adventure park takes up 300,000 square feet (28,000 m^{2}) of space and features a lazy river, outdoor zip lines, a free-fall jump tower, and more.

On March 12, 2018, a piece of HVAC ductwork collapsed from the ceiling of the indoor water park, injuring five people.
