= Tornado outbreak of March 21–23, 2022 =

Spring tornado outbreak in the Southern United States

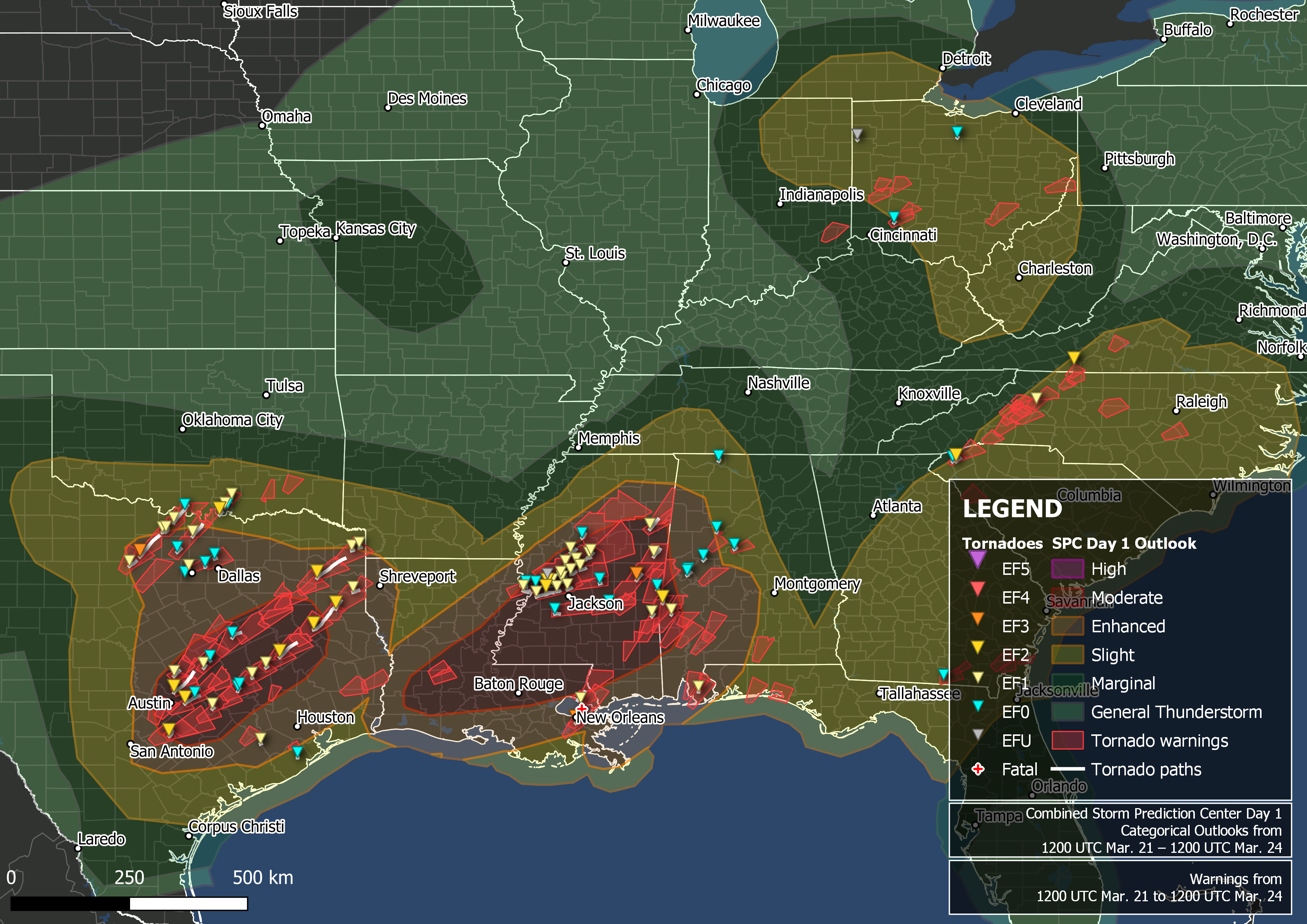
- Confirmed tornadoes and tornado warnings from March 21–23

Meteorological history
- Duration: March 21–23, 2022

Tornado outbreak
- Tornadoes: 86
- Max. rating: EF3 tornado
- Duration: 2 days, 5 hours, 35 minutes
- Highest winds: Tornadic – 160 mph (260 km/h) (Arabi, Louisiana EF3 on March 22)
- Highest gusts: Non-tornadic – 76 mph (122 km/h) (Moundville, Alabama straight-line winds on March 22)
- Largest hail: 2.00 in (5.1 cm) in New Braunfels, Texas, on March 21

Extratropical cyclone
- Max. rainfall: 5.27 in (13.4 cm) in Thorsby, Alabama

Overall effects
- Fatalities: 2 fatalities (+1 indirect; +4 non-tornadic),
- Injuries: 68+ injuries
- Damage: $48.943 million (2022 USD)
- Areas affected: Southern United States, Eastern United States
- Part of the tornado outbreaks of 2022

A large tornado outbreak struck the Southern region of the United States on March 21–22, 2022, before transitioning to the Eastern United States on March 23. The outbreak started with numerous supercell thunderstorms and severe squall lines developing in central Texas and southern Oklahoma, prompting the issuance of numerous tornado warnings, including multiple PDS tornado warnings. An EF3 tornado caused considerable damage in Jacksboro, Texas, while an EF2 tornado from the same storm caused a fatality in Sherwood Shores. Other strong tornadoes caused damage near College Station and in the Austin and Houston metropolitan areas. Severe and tornadic activity continued into the next day as the system moved eastward with numerous tornadoes reported in Mississippi and Alabama. On the evening of March 22, a supercell moved through the New Orleans metropolitan area, with an EF3 tornado producing severe damage in Arabi, resulting in one death and at least two injuries. Widespread flooding also accompanied the decaying squall line in Alabama. Tornadoes occurred on March 23 over the Eastern United States, associated with the same system, including EF2 tornadoes near Pickens, South Carolina, and Gladesboro, Virginia. In all, 86 tornadoes were confirmed.

== Meteorological synopsis ==
=== March 21 ===
South Plains radar loop on March 21.

Signs for a severe weather outbreak became evident multiple days before it came to fruition. On March 19, 2022, the Storm Prediction Center (SPC) issued a Day 3 enhanced risk for the areas encompassing central and eastern Texas and western Louisiana, as readings indicated that atmospheric conditions would become supportive for a damaging severe weather outbreak. The next day, the highlighted area was slightly shifted to the west, covering central Texas, and a 10%, hatched risk for strong tornadoes was introduced, as discrete supercell thunderstorms were expected to develop in the area. On the day of the event, the SPC upped the risk to a moderate risk, encompassing east-central Texas, as atmospheric conditions continued to become more favourable for severe weather. CAPE values reaching 1500-2000 J/kg placed themselves over a highly moist area, with 70 °F dew points present across south-central Texas. Additionally, a strong mid-upper-level jet of around 90 kn (100 mph; 170 km/h) overspread the area, further increasing the instability in the atmosphere. As such, the SPC increased the size of the 10% hatched risk area for tornadoes, and introduced a small 15%, hatched corridor for strong tornadoes to occur, along east-central Texas.

As the evening progressed, and the atmospheric conditions for a major event to take place kept improving, the SPC issued its first tornado watch, spreading from extreme southern Oklahoma, all the way to the San Antonio area, discussing the elevated probabilities for supercells and tornadoes to occur. Multiple supercells soon formed inside and outside the concern area. A powerful supercell developed just outside the main risk area, producing a strong, long-tracked EF3 tornado, that caused considerable damage in the town of Jacksboro, Texas. An EF2 tornado in Sherwood Shores, Texas, caused major damage, killed one person and injured several others. The same storm also produced an EF1 tornado that caused significant damage in Kingston, Oklahoma.

As the evening rolled in, a squadron of powerful tornadic cells formed in the southern and central portions of the watch area. These cells soon became discrete in nature, and their isolation allowed for them to increase in intensity and coverage. Soon, multiple Particularly Dangerous Situation tornado warnings were issued from these supercells, as large and intense tornadoes were reported near Austin, Jarrell, and Elgin, Texas. A tornado was caught on a shopper's camera as it swept though a local Walmart's parking lot damaging multiple stores and leading to the closer of a Ross. The same tornado later hit a tower camera belonging to Austin ABC affiliate KVUE as it hit the Kalahari Resorts water park in Round Rock, Texas. A long-track supercell spawned several tornadoes, including multiple strong EF2 tornadoes, in College Station, Madisonville, Crockett, Alto, Mount Enterprise and Carthage, causing multiple injuries and damaging structures. The EF2 tornado that caused major damage in the Crockett area resulted in a fatality.

=== March 22 ===
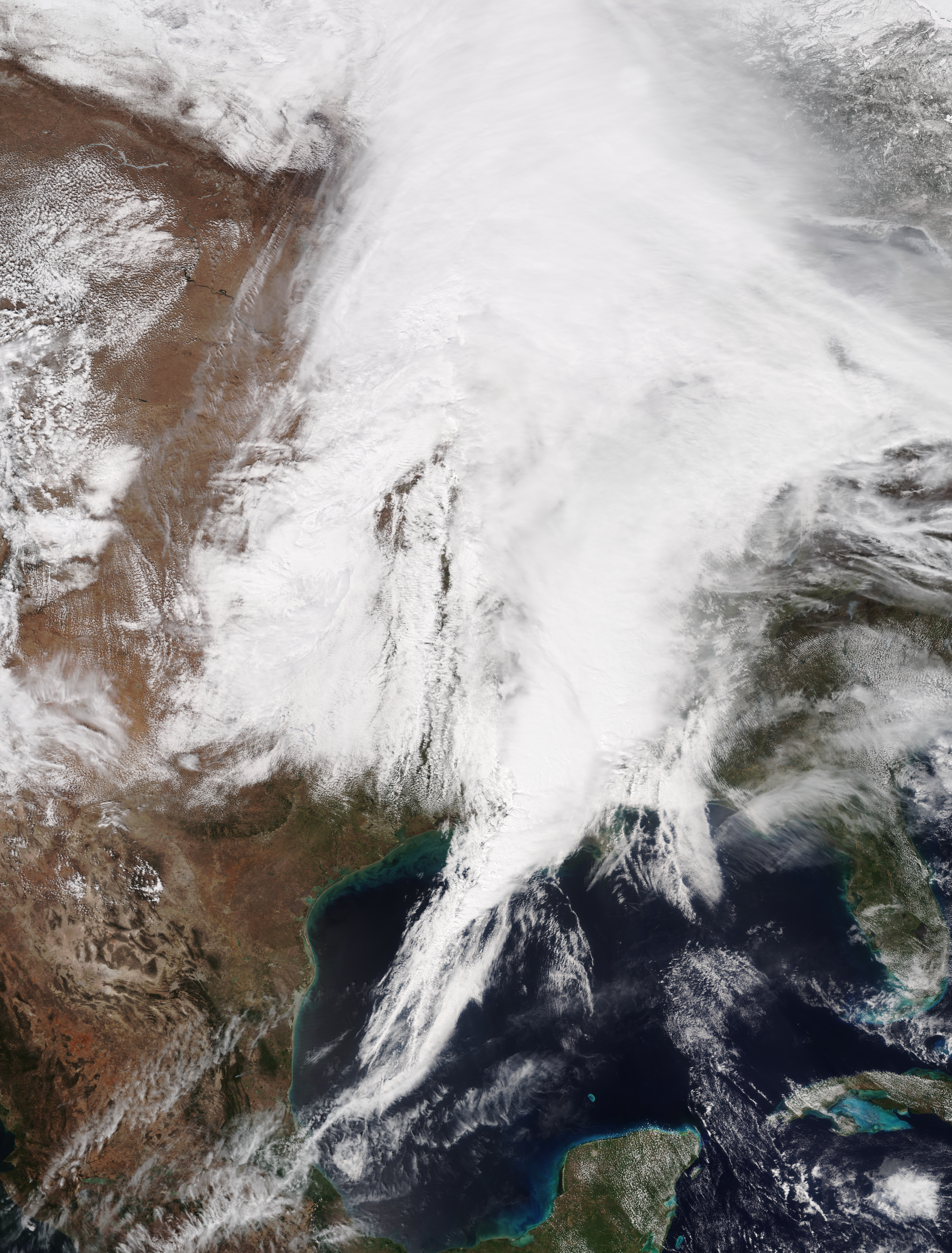
A satellite view of the extratropical cyclone that was responsible for the tornado outbreak.

As the remnants of the storm system moved into Louisiana, it became the base for yet another day of intense tornadic activity. Moderate instability, were CAPE values of around 1500-2000 J/kg were present over central Louisiana and western Mississippi, interacted with 400m2/s2 helicity values and strong wind shear, creating a highly favorable environment for severe weather to develop. At dawn on March 22, the Storm Prediction Center issued a moderate risk encompassing central Louisiana and western Mississippi, and a large 15% hatched probability for tornadoes was introduced, as multiple sustained supercells were expected to develop in the area. In anticipation to the formation of a long squall line with embedded supercell structures in northern Louisiana and western Mississippi, the SPC issued a tornado watch for the area, discussing the moderate probabilities for intense tornadoes to form. It was the first of multiple watches to be issued that day.

As the line of storms progressed, multiple tornadoes were spawned from imbedded circulations within the line, some of which were strong. However, as the evening advanced, a long line of defined supercells developed on central Mississippi, soon becoming tornadic. Multiple tornadoes were reported from this line, including several strong EF2 tornadoes and an EF3 tornado. In Louisiana, a line of intense supercells formed in the late evening hours, and would go on to spawn the most notable tornadoes of the day. An intense high-end EF3 tornado caused considerable damage in the eastern New Orleans neighborhoods, as it was widely captured on video from multiple angles. The most severe damage was in Arabi, where several homes were destroyed. One person was killed and several other were injured. Multiple PDS tornado warnings were issued by the adjacent supercells, as additional tornadoes were spawned by the storms in central Louisiana.

=== March 23 ===
Multiple areas were outlined by the Storm Prediction Center for March 23. The area first outlined was a 15% contour from the Florida Panhandle northeastward into Central Alabama and Central Georgia in a Day 7 outlook issued on March 17. Other than an extension into Central South Carolina, this area did not significantly change until March 20, when the Day 4 outlook for this day significantly expanded to southeastern Virginia southwestward in northern Florida and Alabama was mostly eliminated. Virginia would eventually be removed from this area, but a slight risk covered the rest of the area in the Day 3 and Day 2 outlooks. Additionally, a marginal risk extended into the Great Lakes region and the 17:30 UTC Day 2 outlook added a slight risk to the Ohio Valley. These areas were refined on March 23, and all hazards were expected.

The line of storms that had moved through the Gulf Coast the previous night produced isolated wind damage and a weak tornado in the Florida Panhandle and Georgia. Farther north in the Ohio Valley, multiple severe thunderstorms, including supercells, formed at moved northeastward, producing scattered wind damage and hail. Three weak tornadoes also touched down in Ohio. The most significant area of tornadoes occurred when a small cluster of supercells formed of the higher terrain in the Western Carolinas that evening. Wind damage and tornadoes, two of which were rated EF2, touched down in this area, as well as southwestern Virginia. The storms weakened below severe limits that night. An isolated severe threat was expected the next day across most of the southeastern coast, but no reports came in, as the storm system exited completely into the Atlantic.

== Confirmed tornadoes ==
Confirmed tornadoes by Enhanced Fujita rating
EFU	EF0	EF1	EF2	EF3	EF4	EF5	Total
2	30	38	13	3	0	0	86

=== March 21 event ===
List of confirmed tornadoes – Monday, March 21, 2022 (Note: All dates are based on the local time zone where the tornado touched down; however, all times are in Coordinated Universal Time for consistency.)
EF#	Location	County / Parish	State	Start Coord.	Time (UTC)	Path length	Max width
EF1	Possum Kingdom Lake	Palo Pinto	TX	32.8672°N 98.5296°W	20:12–20:26	9.73 mi (15.66 km)	400 yd (370 m)
EF1	Small metal buildings and multiple homes sustained roof damage, and trees were snapped along the path.						
EF3	SE of Bryson to NE of Jacksboro	Jack, Montague	TX	33.0446°N 98.3298°W	20:35–21:20	34.51 mi (55.54 km)	880 yd (800 m)
EF3	This long-lived and intense tornado touched down after the previous tornado dissipated. It impacted Jacksboro, with the most severe damage occurring at and around Jacksboro Elementary School. Many homes in town sustained loss of their roofs and exterior walls, and a few poorly built homes collapsed. The elementary school was heavily damaged and had the roof of its gymnasium ripped off, also sustaining the collapse of an exterior wall, while nearby flag poles were bent and cars were overturned in the parking lot. The tornado also struck Jacksboro High School, ripping part of its roof off, damaging the press box at the stadium, and bending the field goal and a light pole. An animal shelter in Jacksboro was also destroyed. Significant damage also occurred in areas outside of town, as a 400-foot-tall guyed communications tower was toppled, metal high-tension truss towers were collapsed, and four large wind turbines were destroyed. Major tree damage occurred along the path, while sheds and outbuildings were damaged or destroyed. Approximately 90 homes were damaged or destroyed by this tornado, and 9 people were injured.						
EF1	SW of Bowie	Montague	TX	33.5069°N 97.9021°W	21:31–21:36	2.07 mi (3.33 km)	150 yd (140 m)
EF1	This was the third tornado from the Jacksboro supercell. Multiple small barns and outbuildings were damaged, including one outbuilding that had its roof ripped off and multiple walls collapsed. Several houses sustained roof damage, and a partially full water tank was blown a considerable distance from where it originated.						
EF1	E of Bowie	Montague	TX	33.5182°N 97.8369°W	21:34–21:39	5.19 mi (8.35 km)	440 yd (400 m)
EF1	This was the fourth tornado from the Jacksboro supercell. Multiple site-built and manufactured homes were impacted, several of which had their roofs lifted and walls collapsed. One manufactured home was completely destroyed, and three people were injured.						
EF0	SSE of Decatur	Wise	TX	33.1329°N 97.6229°W	21:47–21:53	6.12 mi (9.85 km)	150 yd (140 m)
EF0	Multiple homes, outbuildings, a large advertising sign, and a storage building were damaged.						
EF1	E of Nocona	Montague	TX	33.688°N 97.6874°W	21:54–22:15	18.66 mi (30.03 km)	500 yd (460 m)
EF1	This was the fifth tornado from the Jacksboro supercell. Several sheds and small barns were damaged, and a manufactured home was separated from its undercarriage. A nearby house suffered damage to its roof and several windows, and tree damage occurred as well. One person was injured.						
EF0	Courtney	Love	OK	33.94°N 97.479°W	22:17–22:32	6.8 mi (10.9 km)	50 yd (46 m)
EF0	This was the sixth tornado from the Jacksboro supercell. One home had minor damage, and several power lines were downed.						
EF1	NE of Slidell to Gainesville	Denton, Cooke	TX	33.4°N 97.34°W	22:15–22:43	20.39 mi (32.81 km)	150 yd (140 m)
EF1	This tornado came from the same supercell that produced the Wise County EF0 tornado. In Era, minor damage to trees and the canopy of a gas station occurred. Elsewhere, homes sustained major roof damage and trees were snapped. A horse trailer was also flipped, a metal implement shed, and other outbuildings were destroyed, and a steel water tank was knocked over. The tornado struck Gainesville near the end of its path, where fencing was downed, and some businesses had roofing blown off. A metal commercial building in town had two roll-up doors blown out and its roof uplifted. The tornado caused minor damage at a cattle yard before it dissipated at the north edge of Gainesville. In February 2025, the path of this tornado was adjusted southward into Denton County based on the damage path on high-resolution satellite imagery.						
EF0	SSW of Benbrook	Tarrant	TX	32.6563°N 97.478°W	22:31–22:33	0.46 mi (0.74 km)	50 yd (46 m)
EF0	A floating marina cover was thrown about 50 yards (46 m) and destroyed. Several boats and one tree were also damaged. Unusually, this tornado formed in the outflow of a nearby storm.						
EF1	River Oaks	Tarrant	TX	32.7874°N 97.403°W	22:37–22:41	1.3 mi (2.1 km)	50 yd (46 m)
EF1	A tornado downed and damaged numerous trees in a neighborhood.						
EF2	ESE of Kingsbury to Stairtown	Guadalupe, Caldwell	TX	29.63°N 97.78°W	22:48–23:08	7.93 mi (12.76 km)	600 yd (550 m)
EF2	Metal panels were ripped from two barns, one of which had its entire roof and part of an exterior wall ripped off. A house had most of its roof torn off, and another home sustained more minor roof damage. A large RV was tossed about 100 feet (30 m) and destroyed, and a four-person ATV was thrown as well. Many large trees were snapped or uprooted, and an old wooden barn was pushed over and twisted as well. The tornado damaged a house, an old RV, and some trees in the small community Stairtown at the end of its path. This was the first of eight tornadoes produced by this supercell.						
EF1	SW of Jarrell to Southern Prairie Dell	Williamson, Bell	TX	30.7736°N 97.6804°W	22:51–23:13	9.29 mi (14.95 km)	300 yd (270 m)
EF1	Several homes sustained significant roof damage, farm outbuildings were damaged or destroyed, and a large metal building had its doors blown out. A stone company also had its large doors blown out, a small metal building was demolished, a utility pole snapped at its base, and multiple trailers were rolled and destroyed. The tornado entered the south edge of Prairie Dell before dissipating, where trees and tree limbs were downed, and some metal fencing and a gate was blown over. This tornado intersected the path of the 1997 Jarrell F5 tornado.						
EF2	Southern Round Rock to NE of Granger to Vilas	Travis, Williamson, Bell	TX	30.4632°N 97.6845°W	22:54–23:47	34.62 mi (55.72 km)	600 yd (550 m)
EF2	A damaging high-end EF2 tornado impacted numerous structures as it touched down in the Austin suburb of Round Rock. Many homes were damaged as the tornado moved through multiple neighborhoods, some of which sustained roof and exterior wall loss. Several businesses and warehouses had broken windows, exterior façade damage, roofing blown off, and HVAC units torn off. Windows were shattered at the Kalahari indoor water park and hotel, cars were flipped in parking lots, and semi-trailers were overturned. A couple of homes that were under construction collapsed as the tornado exited Round Rock and impacted the northern edge of Hutto, then continued to the northeast and passed south of Granger. A few homes, outbuildings, and metal storage unit buildings were heavily damaged or destroyed in this area, including one home that was swept clean from its foundation. An older home on piers sustained total loss of its roof and exterior walls, with some interior walls destroyed and blown away as well. Trees and power poles were downed near Bartlett and in Vilas before the tornado dissipated. Sixteen people were injured.						
EF2	Sherwood Shores, TX to SW of Kingston, OK	Grayson (TX), Marshall (OK)	TX, OK	33.8407°N 96.8192°W	23:11–23:21	5.12 mi (8.24 km)	200 yd (180 m)
EF2	1 death – After the Gainesville EF1 tornado dissipated, this strong tornado touched down in Sherwood Shores, where numerous mobile homes were flipped or destroyed, a couple of site-built homes were also significantly damaged, and one person was killed. One house was shifted off of its foundation, while another lost a large section of its roof, along with a second-floor exterior wall. A shipping container was rolled, and outbuildings were damaged or destroyed as well. A total of 53 structures were destroyed, 27 had major damage, while 105 others sustained lesser damage in the Sherwood Shores area. The tornado crossed Lake Texoma into Oklahoma and struck the Buncombe Creek Marina, where many boats, docks, RVs, and mobile homes were thrown and destroyed. Some frame homes and metal warehouse structures also sustained major structural damage, numerous trees were snapped, and power lines were downed. Less severe damage to trees and outbuildings occurred at the end of the path. Eleven people were injured.						
EF0	Euless	Tarrant	TX	32.8473°N 97.0919°W	23:12–23:14	0.63 mi (1.01 km)	100 yd (91 m)
EF0	A brief and weak tornado touched down in Euless. Trees were snapped or downed, some of which fell on homes and caused minor structural damage.						
EF1	S of Kingston to NE of Milburn	Marshall	OK	33.97°N 96.714°W	23:29–23:41	10.13 mi (16.30 km)	200 yd (180 m)
EF1	This tornado touched down south of Kingston after the Sherwood Shores EF2 tornado dissipated. It moved to the northeast, causing damage to trees and structures along its path. A house near the beginning of the path had extensive roof damage. As the tornado moved through the east edge of Kingston, multiple homes sustained considerable damage, along with some metal buildings that had roof and wall panels pulled off. Additional damage to homes, outbuildings, and trees continued past Kington as the tornado approached and struck Little City, where mostly minor tree and structure damage occurred before it dissipated.						
EF2	NE of Webberville to NE of Elgin	Travis, Bastrop	TX	30.2524°N 97.4755°W	23:30–23:50	11.97 mi (19.26 km)	500 yd (460 m)
EF2	Numerous structures were damaged or destroyed by this high-end EF2 tornado, including within the southern and eastern fringes of Elgin. The tornado destroyed multiple outbuildings and manufactured homes, damaged many frame homes, snapped power poles and trees, and toppled metal truss electrical transmission towers. Two houses had their top floors destroyed, and a large metal-framed warehouse building also sustained major structural damage, including a collapsed wall and buckled roof purlins. The tornado was caught on video as it crossed US 290 and rolled a moving pickup truck onto its side, spun it around 360 degrees, and rolled it back upright, allowing the driver to continue driving down the road. In total, 109 residences and a business were damaged; 32 of those residences sustained major damage, while 20 residences and the business were destroyed. Three people were injured in a manufactured home that was rolled.						
EF0	Northern Carrollton	Denton	TX	33.0042°N 96.913°W	23:31–23:32	1.86 mi (2.99 km)	50 yd (46 m)
EF0	A small section of a roof and shingles were removed from an apartment building in the northern part of Carrollton, and two trees were snapped.						
EF0	E of Kingston	Marshall	OK	33.963°N 96.664°W	23:32–23:35	2.6 mi (4.2 km)	20 yd (18 m)
EF0	This was a satellite tornado of the Kingston EF1 tornado. Trees were damaged.						
EF1	Emet	Johnston	OK	34.142°N 96.587°W	23:43–23:43	7.13 mi (11.47 km)	200 yd (180 m)
EF1	This tornado, which was the final one produced by the Sherwood Shores supercell, damaged trees and the roofs of homes in Emet.						
EF0	NE of Elgin	Bastrop, Lee	TX	30.3667°N 97.2885°W	23:54–00:04	5.53 mi (8.90 km)	50 yd (46 m)
EF0	Minor roof damage to a residence occurred.						
EF1	N of Buckholts to SW of Burlington	Milam	TX	30.9303°N 97.1243°W	00:14–00:24	3.81 mi (6.13 km)	200 yd (180 m)
EF1	Two barns were severely damaged, with one losing most of its roof. A home lost most of its roof shingles, and two wooden power poles were snapped. A tree was also snapped in half.						
EF0	WSW of Rosebud	Falls	TX	31.0641°N 96.9967°W	00:25	0.39 mi (0.63 km)	30 yd (27 m)
EF0	Trees and power lines were damaged by this brief and weak tornado.						
EF1	S of Giddings	Lee	TX	30.1538°N 96.955°W	00:28–00:32	2.46 mi (3.96 km)	50 yd (46 m)
EF1	The roof of a barn was blown off, and the roofs of several metal structures and outbuildings were damaged. A fence was blown down, tree branches were broken, and the cross on the steeple of a church was bent. This was the second tornado produced by the Kingsbury supercell.						
EF0	NE of Groesbeck	Limestone	TX	31.5058°N 96.5759°W	01:08–01:18	11.8 mi (19.0 km)	100 yd (91 m)
EF0	The roofs were ripped from a small barn and two manufactured homes. Several trees, a few metal shelters, and a carport were also damaged. A large, anchored farm outbuilding was wrapped around a tree.						
EF0	Snook	Burleson	TX	30.4909°N 96.4715°W	01:35–01:36	1.01 mi (1.63 km)	500 yd (460 m)
EF0	The roofs of a couple homes, a garage door, and an apartment complex were damaged in town. This was the third tornado produced by the Kingsbury supercell.						
EF0	NNE of Snook	Burleson	TX	30.5422°N 96.4391°W	01:40–01:41	0.29 mi (0.47 km)	175 yd (160 m)
EF0	A small aluminum shed was destroyed at an aquatic facility. A few trees and power lines were downed as well. This was the fourth tornado produced by the Kingsbury supercell.						
EF1	NE of Bryan	Brazos	TX	30.7405°N 96.2008°W	02:05–02:06	0.39 mi (0.63 km)	175 yd (160 m)
EF1	A home was pushed off its block foundation and had its roof damaged. The trunks of trees were snapped as well. This was the fifth tornado produced by the Kingsbury supercell.						
EF1	Madisonville	Madison	TX	30.9357°N 95.9381°W	02:35–02:42	2.44 mi (3.93 km)	200 yd (180 m)
EF1	Several homes and a few businesses sustained considerable damage in Madisonville, including one business that sustained collapse of its brick facade. Several power poles were snapped in town as well. This was the sixth tornado produced by the Kingsbury supercell.						
EF2	Mapleton to NE of Crockett	Houston	TX	31.1346°N 95.675°W	03:10–03:30	19.07 mi (30.69 km)	200 yd (180 m)
EF2	1 death – This strong tornado first touched down in the small community of Mapleton, where a house had its roof torn off, outbuildings were destroyed, and trees were downed. Continuing to the northeast, the tornado snapped or uprooted numerous large trees and destroyed a couple of mobile homes. Three people were seriously injured when they were thrown from one of the mobile homes into an adjacent field. The tornado struck the north edge of Crockett before dissipating, where multiple homes were heavily damaged, including a few that had some roof and exterior wall loss. A convenience store was destroyed in this area as well. 10 people were injured.						
EF2	SSW of Gilmer to N of Ore City to W of Linden	Upshur, Marion, Morris, Cass	TX	32.6428°N 94.966°W	03:20–04:08	39.97 mi (64.33 km)	700 yd (640 m)
EF2	A long-tracked, strong tornado caused high-end EF2 damage along its path. Multiple frame homes had their roofs torn off, and a few sustained exterior wall loss as well, while a poorly anchored guest house was swept completely away behind a residence. One house was struck by a projectile, leaving a large hole in the side of the structure, while the entire second floor of a two-story home was ripped off and destroyed. Multiple RVs were thrown into the water at Lake O’ the Pines, and a bait shop had its roof torn off at that location. Numerous manufactured homes were completely destroyed, along with outbuildings and a metal storage building. Countless trees were snapped along the path, and seven people were injured.						
EF2	W of Linwood to Western Cushing to N of Brachfield	Cherokee, Nacogdoches, Rusk	TX	31.6591°N 95.0306°W	04:16–05:08	37.13 mi (59.75 km)	1,400 yd (1,300 m)
EF2	A large and strong tornado snapped or uprooted many thousands of trees along its path. The tornado impacted the western and northern outskirts of Cushing, where approximately 50 structures were damaged, including a church that was destroyed and multiple homes that sustained partial to complete roof loss. Elsewhere along the path, mobile homes were thrown and destroyed, and frame homes sustained significant damage. Metal truss electrical transmission towers were blown over, and numerous outbuildings were damaged or destroyed along the path. This was the seventh tornado produced by the Kingsbury supercell.						
EF1	SE of Douglassville	Cass	TX	33.1614°N 94.3085°W	04:21–04:23	1.82 mi (2.93 km)	150 yd (140 m)
EF1	A brief tornado embedded in a squall line snapped about 10 trees.						
EF1	SSW of Domino	Cass	TX	33.2148°N 94.1655°W	04:29–04:32	2.03 mi (3.27 km)	200 yd (180 m)
EF1	A tornado embedded in a squall line snapped approximately 30 trees and caused roof damage to manufactured homes.						

=== March 22 event ===
List of confirmed tornadoes – Tuesday, March 22, 2022
EF#	Location	County / Parish	State	Start Coord.	Time (UTC)	Path length	Max width
EF2	NE of Brachfield to SW of Beckville	Rusk, Panola	TX	32.0548°N 94.6089°W	05:08–05:25	11.92 mi (19.18 km)	500 yd (460 m)
EF2	This was the eighth and final tornado produced by the Kingsbury supercell. Multiple homes were significantly damaged, including one that sustained high-end EF2 damage, losing most of its roof and several exterior walls. Over 1,000 trees were snapped, outbuildings were damaged or destroyed, farming equipment was overturned, and one person was injured.						
EF1	S of Scottsville	Harrison	TX	32.371°N 94.2821°W	05:49–06:00	6.58 mi (10.59 km)	200 yd (180 m)
EF1	About 30 trees were snapped or uprooted. This was the eighth and last tornado produced by the Kingsbury supercell.						
EF1	W of Beasley	Fort Bend	TX	29.4886°N 96.0397°W	10:35–10:37	0.82 mi (1.32 km)	30 yd (27 m)
EF1	An RV was flipped, a house was heavily damaged, and a few trees were uprooted. Four people in the RV were injured.						
EF0	Eastern Danbury	Brazoria	TX	29.2286°N 95.3365°W	12:21–12:22	0.13 mi (0.21 km)	30 yd (27 m)
EF0	A brief tornado was captured on a security camera. Minor tree damage occurred at the east edge of town.						
EF1	NW of Delta, LA	Madison (LA), Warren (MS)	LA, MS	32.398°N 91.05°W	16:23–16:31	6.57 mi (10.57 km)	100 yd (91 m)
EF1	Several trees were snapped. The tornado path became inaccessible due to the Mississippi River.						
EF0	E of Peelers, MS	Madison (LA), Warren (MS)	LA, MS	32.48°N 91°W	16:29–16:31	0.58 mi (0.93 km)	50 yd (46 m)
EF0	A metal roof was ripped off, siding and fencing were damaged, and a few power poles were downed.						
EF0	NNE of Vicksburg	Warren	MS	32.4756°N 90.813°W	16:43–16:45	1.11 mi (1.79 km)	50 yd (46 m)
EF0	Trees were snapped, a small shed was blown apart, and a manufactured home had damage to its skirting.						
EF1	SE of Vicksburg to ENE of Edwards	Warren, Hinds	MS	32.28°N 90.8°W	16:58–17:13	14.84 mi (23.88 km)	350 yd (320 m)
EF1	This tornado impacted the town of Edwards, where several trees were downed and a few landed on structures. Many additional trees were downed elsewhere along the path, three outbuildings sustained significant roof damage, and homes and other outbuildings sustained damage from falling trees. One tree fell through the roof and wall of a house, causing significant damage.						
EFU	SW of Satartia	Yazoo	MS	32.6211°N 90.5901°W	17:04–17:05	0.73 mi (1.17 km)	50 yd (46 m)
EFU	A storm chaser documented a tornado on video. No known damage occurred.						
EF2	N of Edwards	Hinds	MS	32.366°N 90.6169°W	17:11–17:19	7.75 mi (12.47 km)	500 yd (460 m)
EF2	Several manufactured homes, outbuildings, houses, and a church suffered loss of roofing material. The most severe damage occurred to one home that had its entire roof removed. Two manufactured homes were shifted off their foundations, one of which was heavily damaged. Numerous trees were snapped or uprooted, and some power poles were snapped.						
EF2	N of Edwards to WSW of Flora	Hinds, Madison	MS	32.4839°N 90.5914°W	17:13–17:22	8.63 mi (13.89 km)	880 yd (800 m)
EF2	A strong tornado tracked through remote forested areas, where numerous large trees were snapped or uprooted along a wide swath. The tornado was accompanied by strong inflow winds up to 80 mph (130 km/h) which downed additional trees and utility poles.						
EF1	W of Flora	Hinds, Madison	MS	32.5176°N 90.4939°W	17:20–17:28	9.05 mi (14.56 km)	800 yd (730 m)
EF1	Numerous trees were downed and a house lost a large portion of its roof.						
EF1	NE of Bolton	Hinds	MS	32.3848°N 90.4129°W	17:24–17:31	3.33 mi (5.36 km)	300 yd (270 m)
EF1	Trees and a shed were damaged.						
EF1	N of Flora	Madison	MS	32.5676°N 90.3164°W	17:29–17:33	2.58 mi (4.15 km)	350 yd (320 m)
EF1	The roof was ripped off the back half of a manufactured home, and siding was ripped from its sides. A detached carport at an adjacent home was destroyed and blown across the yard. A large section of roofing material was stripped from another manufactured home. Trees were snapped and uprooted as well.						
EF1	ENE of Bentonia	Yazoo, Madison	MS	32.6583°N 90.3375°W	17:30–17:39	5.51 mi (8.87 km)	600 yd (550 m)
EF1	Trees were snapped and uprooted along the path.						
EF1	SE of Eden	Yazoo	MS	32.8692°N 90.2486°W	17:35–17:37	1.4 mi (2.3 km)	550 yd (500 m)
EF1	Numerous trees were snapped and uprooted, and a house had a large section of its metal roof removed.						
EF1	W of Ridgeland	Madison	MS	32.4212°N 90.2125°W	17:42–17:48	5 mi (8.0 km)	250 yd (230 m)
EF1	Several trees and tree limbs were downed, including one tree that fell on a home and a barn.						
EF1	NW of Canton	Yazoo	MS	32.7092°N 90.1494°W	17:44–17:51	6.53 mi (10.51 km)	200 yd (180 m)
EF1	Tree damage occurred along the path, with the most significant occurring near Highway 16 where numerous trees were downed.						
EF1	NW of Lexington	Holmes	MS	33.119°N 90.1513°W	17:49–17:57	7.43 mi (11.96 km)	700 yd (640 m)
EF1	Numerous trees were snapped or uprooted. Sporadic structural damage also occurred, mainly to outbuildings.						
EF0	W of Crystal Springs	Copiah	MS	31.958°N 90.4496°W	17:49–17:57	4.87 mi (7.84 km)	100 yd (91 m)
EF0	The metal roof was ripped off a business. Multiple trees were downed as well, one of which fell onto a house.						
EF1	NW of Pickens to Goodman to W of Sallis	Holmes, Attala	MS	32.9109°N 90.0413°W	17:52–18:08	14.2 mi (22.9 km)	700 yd (640 m)
EF1	A high-end EF1 tornado caused considerable damage in Goodman, where extensive tree damage occurred, power poles were snapped, an apartment building had part of its roof torn off, and some outbuilding structures were destroyed. Significant roof damage was inflicted to multiple structures, including several buildings on the campus of Holmes Community College. A gas station was heavily damaged, with the canopy being destroyed and the convenience store losing its metal roofing. In other areas outside of town, homes sustained minor damage, a shed was destroyed, a travel trailer was lofted across a roadway, fencing and a hunting stand was blown over, and trees were snapped or uprooted.						
EF1	SSE of Pickens	Madison	MS	32.79°N 89.97°W	17:59–18:04	6.43 mi (10.35 km)	200 yd (180 m)
EF1	Many trees were snapped, a house had its porch awning torn off, and a large barn had a large section of its roof blown off.						
EF1	W of Sallis	Attala	MS	33.026°N 89.7981°W	18:09–18:11	1.53 mi (2.46 km)	100 yd (91 m)
EF1	Numerous trees were downed.						
EF1	N of Sallis	Attala	MS	33.0779°N 89.7654°W	18:14–18:18	3.35 mi (5.39 km)	200 yd (180 m)
EF1	Numerous trees were snapped or downed.						
EF0	ENE of Coila to SE of Carrollton	Carroll	MS	33.4021°N 89.933°W	18:16–18:23	6.34 mi (10.20 km)	400 yd (370 m)
EF0	A covered awning was damaged near a manufactured home, and intermittent tree damage occurred along the path.						
EF0	S of Lena	Scott	MS	32.5338°N 89.5993°W	18:45–18:47	1.57 mi (2.53 km)	100 yd (91 m)
EF0	Multiple trees were damaged or uprooted, and an old manufactured home was damaged.						
EF0	N of Sylvarena	Smith	MS	32.1109°N 89.4196°W	19:34–19:37	1.52 mi (2.45 km)	100 yd (91 m)
EF0	A couple of trees were damaged, and one was uprooted.						
EF3	SW of De Kalb	Kemper	MS	32.6016°N 88.8976°W	19:35–19:46	9.21 mi (14.82 km)	800 yd (730 m)
EF3	A strong tornado snapped or uprooted numerous large trees in the Damascus area, and entire stands of trees were mowed down in some areas. One tree fell on a mobile home, destroying the structure. A frame home was destroyed with only a few walls left partially standing, and a mobile home was obliterated after it was ripped from its anchors and thrown 100 yards (91 m) through the air into trees. A horse trailer and hay bales were also thrown, and outbuildings were damaged or destroyed, including one that was completely destroyed with its debris strewn downwind.						
EF1	S of West Point to WNW of New Hamilton	Clay, Monroe	MS	33.57°N 88.6414°W	20:04–20:20	15.47 mi (24.90 km)	650 yd (590 m)
EF1	A few homes sustained minor damage, many trees were downed, and several power poles were snapped. Minor roof damage occurred to buildings at a livestock facility. One person was injured in Clay County while trying to run from a vehicle to a house.						
EF1	SE of Macon	Noxubee	MS	33.0475°N 88.5701°W	20:17–20:34	11.61 mi (18.68 km)	450 yd (410 m)
EF1	A storage shed and a carport were damaged, and about nine power poles were snapped. Trees and tree limbs were downed as well.						
EF0	Toomsuba	Lauderdale	MS	32.4093°N 88.5061°W	21:04–21:06	1.47 mi (2.37 km)	25 yd (23 m)
EF0	A house sustained minor roof damage, and some minor tree damage occurred in town.						
EF2	E of Cyril to S of Yantley	Choctaw	AL	32.1601°N 88.4028°W	21:58–22:04	4.33 mi (6.97 km)	300 yd (270 m)
EF2	A manufactured home was destroyed after being lifted and rolled, and sheet metal debris from the structure was wrapped around trees. Numerous large trees were snapped or uprooted, a power pole was downed, and a house sustained minor roof damage as well. In November 2023, this tornado was reanalyzed and had its path length adjusted from 2.45 mi (3.94 km) to 4.33 mi (6.97 km).						
EF0	NW of Collinwood	Wayne	TN	35.2°N 87.78°W	22:05–22:07	1.93 mi (3.11 km)	200 yd (180 m)
EF0	A high-end EF0 tornado moved due north, blowing down a few trees and causing some minor damage to outbuildings around a home. Continuing northward, the tornado strengthened and blew down dozens of trees in all directions, with strong spiral and convergent patterns noted in the tree fall pattern. Intermittent tree damage continued before the tornado lifted. This tornado was discovered in May 2023 using high-resolution satellite imagery.						
EF0	NW of Rogersville	Lauderdale	AL	34.8657°N 87.3377°W	22:29–22:34	1.85 mi (2.98 km)	140 yd (130 m)
EF0	Several trees were damaged, two of which fell on structures. The attached garage at one house had an exterior wall blown in, allowing winds to uplift a portion of the roof of home. Power lines were downed as well.						
EF1	NE of Shubuta	Clarke	MS	31.9095°N 88.6071°W	22:34–22:39	3.67 mi (5.91 km)	100 yd (91 m)
EF1	Numerous trees were damaged or uprooted, a manufactured home had its tin roof peeled off, and a metal shed was demolished as well.						
EF0	Thornhill	Greene	AL	32.6906°N 87.9379°W	23:00–23:02	0.88 mi (1.42 km)	150 yd (140 m)
EF0	Trees were downed, and a hunting blind was overturned.						
EF0	NNE of Thornhill	Greene	AL	32.7238°N 87.9136°W	23:04–23:08	3.27 mi (5.26 km)	250 yd (230 m)
EF0	A chicken house sustained roof damage, and a few shingles were blown off a house too. Several trees were downed.						
EF0	Williams Camp	Tuscaloosa	AL	33.5094°N 87.3777°W	23:21–23:25	0.97 mi (1.56 km)	175 yd (160 m)
EF0	A brief tornado downed trees and caused minor damage to several homes and a couple of boat houses.						
EF1	NW of Lou	Choctaw	AL	31.9457°N 88.2364°W	23:33–23:38	3.05 mi (4.91 km)	130 yd (120 m)
EF1	A manufactured home was shifted off its foundation, with its carport and a nearby shed being heavily damaged. The metal roof was lifted off the back of a nearby house, causing tornadic winds to blow out the front windows, walls, and part of the roof structure. Metal from the house was wrapped around trees. Numerous trees were snapped or uprooted along the path as well. In November 2023, this tornado was reanalyzed and had its path length adjusted from 0.19 mi (0.31 km) to 3.05 mi (4.91 km).						
EF0	Southeastern Moundville	Hale, Tuscaloosa	AL	32.98°N 87.63°W	23:38–23:42	3.13 mi (5.04 km)	430 yd (390 m)
EF0	The roofs of a barn and business in town were damaged. Numerous trees were uprooted, at least two of which fell on a permanent house and a manufactured home.						
EF3	Gretna to Arabi to New Orleans East	Jefferson, Orleans, St. Bernard	LA	29.8849°N 90.0535°W	00:21–00:37	11.47 mi (18.46 km)	320 yd (290 m)
EF3	1 death – See section on this tornado – Two people were injured.						
EF1	N of Lacombe	St. Tammany	LA	30.2617°N 89.957°W	00:25–00:33	15.64 mi (25.17 km)	100 yd (91 m)
EF1	This low-end EF1 tornado touched down along US 190 on the north shore of Lake Pontchartrain and moved northeast, north of Lacombe. Several homes sustained minor roof damage, a shed was destroyed, and dozens of trees were downed.						
EF0	W of Maylene	Bibb, Shelby	AL	33.1858°N 87.0408°W	02:08–02:13	2.76 mi (4.44 km)	100 yd (91 m)
EF0	Many trees were downed in forested areas roughly halfway between Woodstock and Maylene.						
EF1	WSW of Summerdale to Robertsdale	Baldwin	AL	30.4798°N 87.7198°W	04:07–04:16	5.68 mi (9.14 km)	30 yd (27 m)
EF1	Near Summerdale, a storage building sustained damage to its walls and had roofing material removed. Trees were snapped, gravel was blown off a road surface, and irrigation pivots were flipped over. Two homes sustained minor damage as the tornado continued north of town. A few businesses sustained minor roof damage and tree limbs were downed in Robertsdale before the tornado dissipated, and a shed was overturned in town as well.						

=== March 23 event ===
List of confirmed tornadoes – Wednesday, March 23, 2022
EF#	Location	County / Parish	State	Start Coord.	Time (UTC)	Path length	Max width
EF0	W of Statenville	Echols	GA	30.7004°N 83.0635°W	18:53–18:54	0.51 mi (0.82 km)	25 yd (23 m)
EF0	Single-wide manufactured homes were damaged, and tree limbs were downed.						
EF0	W of Clarksville	Warren, Clinton	OH	39.3919°N 84.0061°W	19:42–19:45	1.71 mi (2.75 km)	50 yd (46 m)
EF0	A barn collapsed, a pop-up camper was flipped, and trees were snapped or uprooted. A house had its doors blown in.						
EFU	N of Convoy	Van Wert	OH	40.9651°N 84.7032°W	21:31–21:33	0.28 mi (0.45 km)	20 yd (18 m)
EFU	A landspout tornado was captured on video. No damage was reported.						
EF0	SW of Willard	Huron	OH	41.0090°N 82.8065°W	22:11–22:13	0.81 mi (1.30 km)	100 yd (91 m)
EF0	A metal barn was damaged, a fifth wheel trailer was pushed, and garage doors were caved in.						
EF2	W of Pickens	Pickens	SC	34.854°N 82.828°W	00:56–01:07	6.25 mi (10.06 km)	440 yd (400 m)
EF2	Hundreds of trees were downed, including one that fell on a mobile home. A site-built home sustained major roof and exterior wall damage, and a manufactured home was torn in two and rolled off its foundation. Another home had its metal roofing peeled off, and an outbuilding was destroyed. Three people sustained minor injuries.						
EF0	WNW of Six Mile	Pickens	SC	34.851°N 82.894°W	01:29–01:30	0.09 mi (0.14 km)	20 yd (18 m)
EF0	A few trees were snapped or uprooted by this brief, weak tornado.						
EF2	NNE of Gladesboro	Carroll	VA	36.6922°N 80.5873°W	01:45–01:47	1.92 mi (3.09 km)	125 yd (114 m)
EF2	A two-story home was shifted off its foundation and had its roof torn off, and a modular home lost half of its roof. Numerous trees were snapped or uprooted along the path.						
EF1	NW of Taylorsville	Alexander	NC	35.954°N 81.301°W	02:59–03:09	6.17 mi (9.93 km)	150 yd (140 m)
EF1	Dozens of trees were downed and a small barn was completely destroyed, while a second barn sustained moderate damage. A house suffered roof and siding damage, and a double-wide manufactured home sustained severe damage to its exterior.						

=== Gretna–Arabi–New Orleans East, Louisiana ===
Gretna–Arabi–New Orleans East, Louisiana
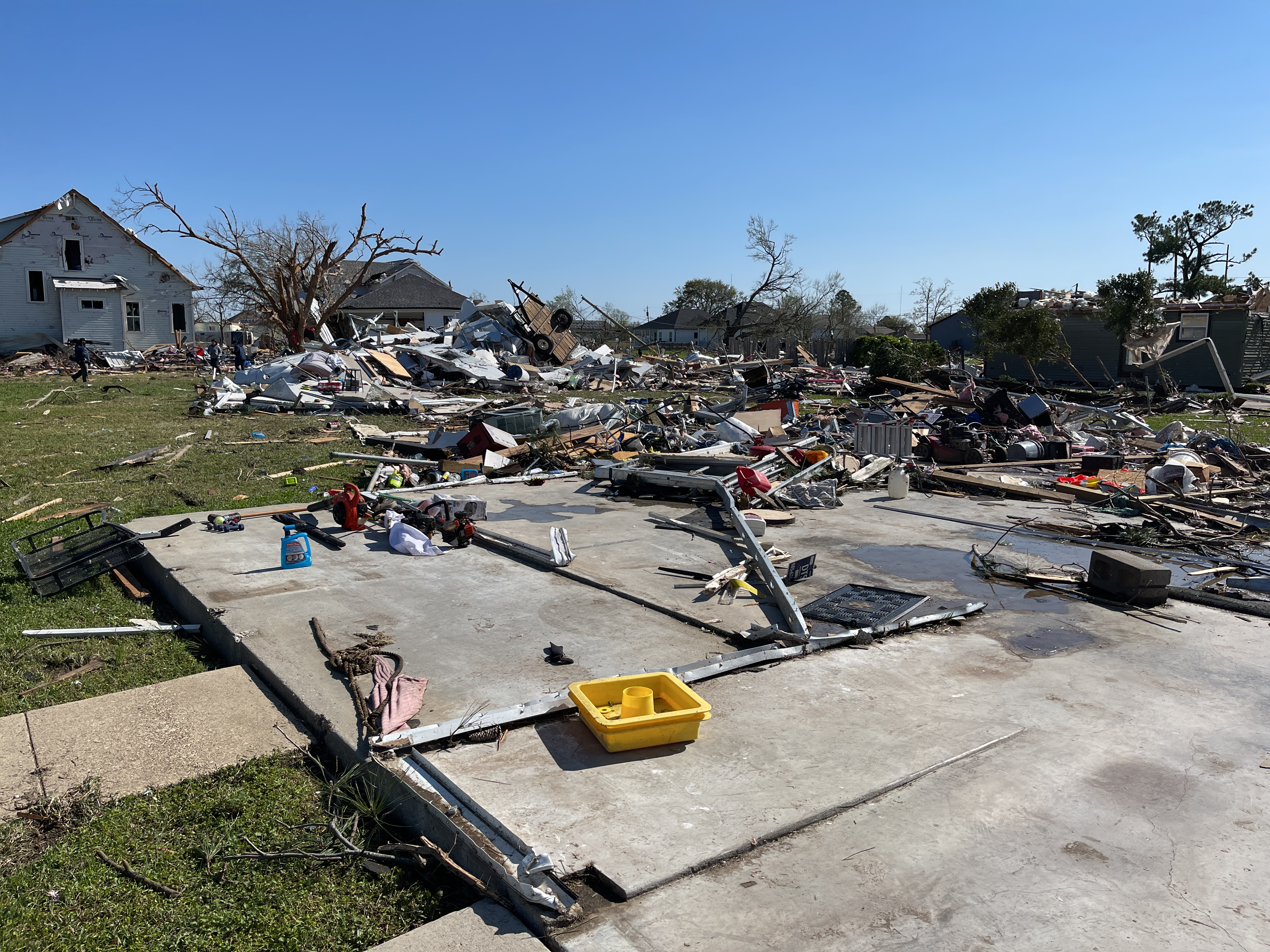
- High-end EF3 damage to a home in Arabi

Meteorological history
- Formed: March 22, 2022, 7:21 p.m. CDT (UTC−05:00)
- Dissipated: March 22, 2022, 7:38 p.m. CDT
- Duration: 17 minutes

EF3 tornado
- on the Enhanced Fujita scale
- Highest winds: 160 mph (260 km/h)

Overall effects
- Fatalities: 1 (+1 indirect)
- Injuries: 2+
- Damage: $32.5 million (2022 USD)
- Areas affected: Southeastern New Orleans metropolitan area
- Power outages: 16,000

On March 22, this strong tornado touched down and moved through the New Orleans metropolitan area, originating in Gretna in Jefferson Parish at 7:21 p.m. CDT (00:21 UTC). The tornado began near Manhattan Boulevard and damaged some traffic lights. As it crossed Hero Drive and Claire Avenue, homes sustained minor roof damage and broken windows. A parked van was moved slightly, while fencing and tree limbs were downed. Minor damage continued as it moved through Gretna Park and across Mason Street and Creagan Avenue, where patio furniture and trees were damaged, and homes sustained minor damage to roofs, garages, and carports. The tornado then moved through parts of Terrytown, where homes and businesses had roofing material blown off. Additional damage occurred as the tornado crossed into the Algiers area of Orleans Parish. It moved across General Meyer Avenue and Patterson Drive in Algiers before it was caught on video crossing the Mississippi River. Damage in Algiers consisted of downed trees and tree branches, along with roof and siding damage to structures. All damage in the West Bank area (Gretna, Terrytown, Algiers) was consistent with an EF0 rating. After crossing the river, the tornado intensified to EF2 strength as it moved into St. Bernard Parish and the community of Arabi, just east of the Lower Ninth Ward of New Orleans. The tornado was broadcast live on television by skycam on WDSU as it was passing through the area, exhibiting horizontal vortices and accompanied by power flashes. Moving almost due-north through the middle of Arabi, the tornado caused a relatively narrow path of severe damage along the Friscoville Avenue corridor. Many homes in this area were badly damaged and sustained total loss of their roofs, detached garages were destroyed, power lines were downed, and trees were snapped. The exterior wall of an automotive repair business was blown outward, and a metal warehouse building that housed a brewery was destroyed. High-end EF2 damage occurred near the intersection of Friscoville Avenue and St. Bernard Highway (LA 46), where the La Vid Verdedera church was destroyed, cars were flipped, a strip mall was partially destroyed, and a small house was pushed off its foundation and largely collapsed. EF2 damage continued in neighborhoods north of St. Bernard Highway, where more homes had their roofs torn off and many trees were snapped or uprooted. Arabi Elementary School sustained damage to its roof and fencing, and a school bus was overturned at that location.

Continuing to the north-northeast at high-end EF2 strength, it then crossed into residential areas north of Judge Perez Drive (LA 39). Homes in this area had roofs and exterior walls torn off, and some were shifted off of their foundations. The tornado intensified further as it crossed Patricia Street into the St. Claude Heights neighborhood in northern Arabi. It reached its peak strength at this location as it moved along Rose Street and Benjamin Street, where multiple houses had major structural damage or were destroyed. One well-built home that was extensively anchored with foundation straps was torn from its block foundation; it was pushed 50 yards (46 m) away and rotated 90 degrees, although the house itself remained mostly intact. Two other nearby homes were completely leveled and swept away, one of which was reduced to a bare foundation slab. However, due to construction quality, a rating above EF3 was not assigned. As a result, damage in this area received a high-end EF3 rating, with winds estimated at 160 mph (260 km/h). Numerous other houses in this area had total roof and exterior wall loss, with only interior rooms left intact. Homes that were farther away from the center of the damage path suffered considerable roof and siding damage, and many had their windows blown out.

The tornado momentarily weakened back to EF2 strength within the vicinity of Sidney Street, and dozens of homes suffered partial to total roof loss along this segment of the path. At least one house had partial exterior wall loss, and another residence was shifted off of its foundation. A large RV was tossed and flipped over, and power poles were snapped as well. Just north of here, the tornado reached EF3 strength for a second time, and multiple houses had their roofs torn off and exterior walls collapsed. A couple of poorly anchored homes built on raised pier foundations were swept completely away, and debris was scattered throughout the neighborhood. The lone fatality from the tornado occurred in this area when a pickup truck was thrown against a tree, killing the driver. Some metal truss electrical transmission towers were significantly damaged along the bank of the Florida Canal as the tornado exited Arabi. The tornado weakened substantially as it moved back into Orleans Parish across Bayou Bienvenue and the Gulf Intracoastal Waterway, again causing minor damage consistent with an EF0 rating. Minor damage continued as the tornado crossed Almonaster Avenue into New Orleans East. A metal building sustained damage to its exterior, and some metal shipping containers were rolled into wooden power poles, snapping them in half. Several fences, trees, and tree limbs were downed, and more homes sustained mainly minor roof, siding, and garage door damage in the area of Read Boulevard, Chef Menteur Highway (US 90), Prentiss Avenue, and Coronado Drive before the tornado dissipated at 7:38 p.m. CDT (00:38 UTC) near Dwyer Road at Joe W. Brown Memorial Park, south of I-10.

The tornado traveled 11.45 miles (18.43 km) and reached a maximum path width of 320 yards (290 m). In addition to the fatality, at least two people were injured. As a high-end EF3, this tornado was the strongest ever on record to hit the New Orleans metropolitan area, with winds of up to 160 mph. An EF2 tornado would strike Gretna and Arabi just nine months later on December 14, 2022. Unlike this tornado, that tornado would cause significant damage in both communities. In that tornado, six people were injured.

== Non-tornadic effects ==
The storms produced 1–6 in (25–152 mm) inches of rain to areas of Texas where many areas were facing drought conditions and about 170 wildfires, helping lessen the impact of the previous conditions. In Amarillo, Texas, a daily record of 3.1 in (7.9 cm) of snow fell. The snowstorm shut down Interstate 70 from Aurora, Colorado, to the Kansas state line. A flash flood warning was issued for northwestern Tuscaloosa County, Alabama at 7:21 p.m. CDT (00:21 UTC) on March 22, which was originally scheduled to expire at 9:15 p.m. CDT (02:15 UTC); however, it was extended until 10:15 p.m. CDT (03:15 UTC). These floods closed some roads near the campus of the University of Alabama, and overflowed Twomile Creek in Northport; no damage has been reported yet as a result of these floods. Flash flood warnings were issued throughout several other counties in Alabama as well, including Shelby, Jefferson, Walker, Greene, and Hale counties. This flash flooding submerged a car, killing three people.

== Preparations and impacts ==
Due to the projected path of severe weather, many schools either closed early or cancelled after-school activities March 22 in Louisiana and Mississippi to allow for students to get to safety and shelters were opened for those without adequate protection.

Multiple Amtrak trains were severely delayed due to having to wait for severe weather to pass along their routes on March 21. At least 19 people were hospitalized due to injuries from the severe weather in Texas; about 10 were hospitalized in Grayson County and about 9 were treated in Jack County.

== Aftermath ==
On March 22, Texas governor Greg Abbott issued a disaster declaration for 16 counties in the state. Over 48,000 households in Texas were reported to be without power the morning of March 22, and several schools in the Houston area opened late. In Jacksboro, Texas the high school and elementary school were reported to be damaged along with between 60 and 80 homes, with damage also seen in Round Rock, Granger, and Taylor, Texas. Louisiana governor John Bel Edwards issued a state of emergency for Jefferson, Orleans, St. Bernard, and St. Tammany parishes following the tornadoes. After the storm it was reported that about 8,000 customers were without power in New Orleans, and about 13,000 customers were without power in the three surrounding parishes.

== See also ==
- Weather of 2022
- List of North American tornadoes and tornado outbreaks
- Tornado outbreak of February 7, 2017
