= Enchantment of the Seas =

Royal Caribbean cruise ship having Baltimore, Maryland as home port

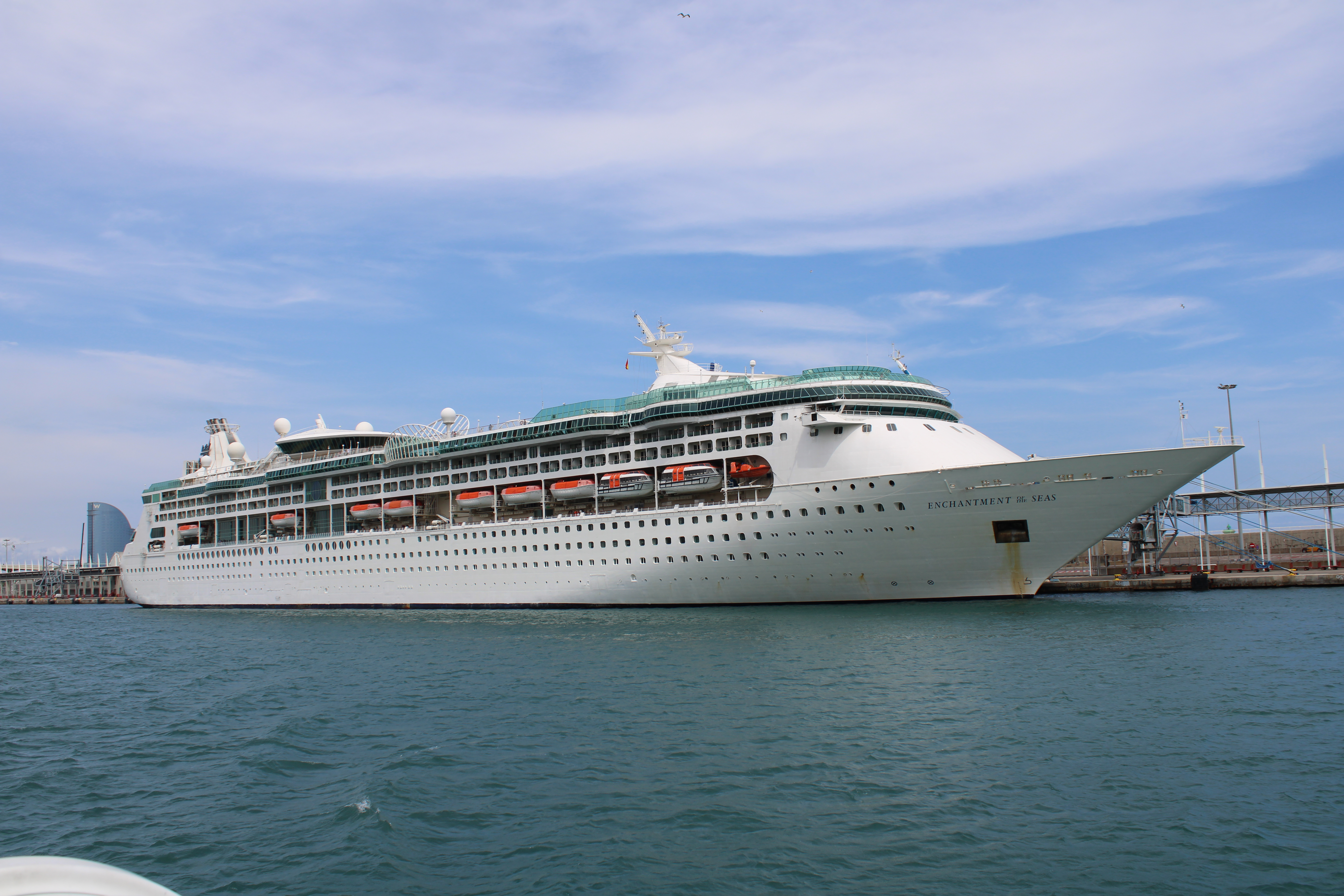
- Enchantment of the Seas in Barcelona on 3 July 2023

History

Bahamas
- Name: Enchantment of the Seas
- Owner: Enchantment of the Seas
- Operator: Royal Caribbean International
- Port of registry: 1997–2005: Oslo, Norway; 2005–: Nassau, Bahamas
- Route: Caribbean
- Ordered: 3 August 1994
- Builder: Kvaerner Masa Yards Helsinki New Shipyard, Helsinki, Finland
- Yard number: 493
- Laid down: 25 October 1995
- Launched: 20 November 1996
- Completed: 3 July 1997
- Maiden voyage: 13 July 1997
- In service: 1997-present
- Identification: Call sign: C6FZ7; IMO number: 9111802; MMSI number: 311733000
- Status: Active service out of Tampa, FL

General characteristics
- Class & type: Vision-class cruise ship
- Tonnage: 1997–2005: 74,000 GT; 2005 onwards: 82,910 GT
- Length: 1997–2005: 279.20 m (916.01 ft); 2005 onwards: 301.36 m (988.71 ft)
- Beam: 106 ft (32.31 m)
- Height: 59 m (193 ft 7 in)
- Draft: 8.3 m (27.23 ft)
- Decks: 11 passenger decks
- Speed: 22 knots (41 km/h; 25 mph)
- Capacity: 2,446 Passengers
- Notes: Sister ship to Grandeur of the Seas

Enchantment of the Seas is a Vision-class cruise ship operated by Royal Caribbean International.

== Propellers ==
The two propellers are highly skewed fixed pitch types, manufactured in Sweden. Enchantment of the Seas and her sister ship Grandeur of the Seas were the first two major cruise ships to be equipped with a Dynamic Positioning System frequently used to maintain position while in port, particularly when tender boats are used.

== Refits ==
In 2005, the Enchantment of the Seas was overhauled. Part of overhaul included stretching the vessel by cutting it in two amidship and adding a 73-foot (22 m) long section. Enchantment of the Seas entered dry dock at Keppel Verolme shipyards in Rotterdam on 15 May 2005. The mid-body extension section was built at Aker Finnyards ahead of time, allowing the construction to be done in just over a month.

The ship resumed service on 7 July 2005, less than two months after entering dry dock. The new section added included 151 new passenger cabins.

In December 2012, Enchantment of the Seas went into drydock in Freeport, Bahamas for a further refurbishment.

== Incidents ==
On 30 September 2009, while Enchantment of the Seas was berthed at Cozumel, Mexico, high winds pushed the cruise ship Carnival Legend against the side resulting in damage to both ships. A Royal Caribbean spokeswoman commented that the ship had minor damage to the stern and some railings. Both ships were able to depart to their next ports of call after being inspected by port authorities.

In September 2017, Enchantment of the Seas evacuated the company's employees and their families from Miami when they had been endangered by Hurricane Irma.
