= Pocono Manor Historic District =

Historic district in Pennsylvania, United States

- U.S. National Register of Historic Places
- U.S. Historic district
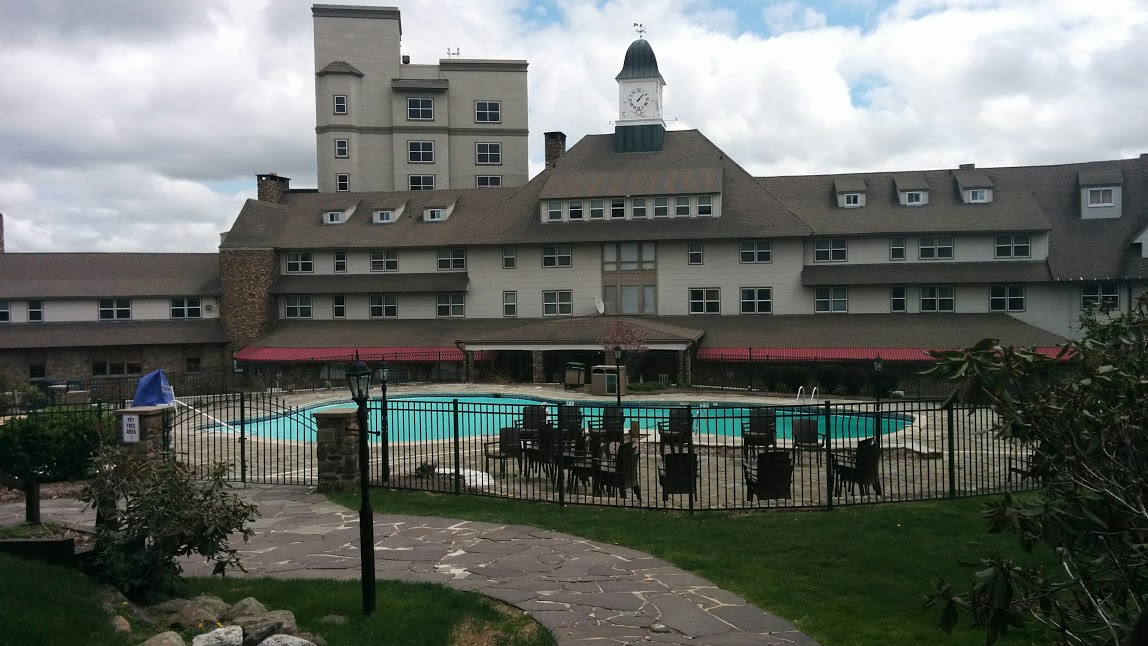
- Front of main building, May 2015

- Location within Pennsylvania Location within the United States
- Location: Roughly bounded by PA 314, Lake and Cliff Rds., and Summit Ave., Pocono Township and Tobyhanna Township, Pennsylvania
- Coordinates: 41°04′00″N 75°14′29″W
- Area: 2,500 acres (1,000 ha)
- Built: 1902
- Architect: Multiple
- Architectural style: Stick/eastlake, Shingle Style, Bungalow/craftsman
- NRHP reference No.: 97000287
- Added to NRHP: April 11, 1997

The Pocono Manor Historic District is a national historic district that is located in Pocono Township and Tobyhanna Township, Monroe County, Pennsylvania.

This district encompasses seventy-five contributing buildings, one contributing site, four contributing structures, and four contributing objects that are located on the grounds of the historic Pocono Manor resort.

This historic district was added to the National Register of Historic Places in 1997.

== History ==
This resort community was established in 1902, and includes an inn, recreational complex, and a dependent cottage community. The cottage community, which was originally developed by Quakers, reflects popular early twentieth-century architectural styles, including Stick/Eastlake, Shingle Style, and Bungalow/American Craftsman.

The Pocono Manor Inn was built in nine sections between 1902 and 1949. The seven earliest sections, which were built between 1902 and 1926, were designed by noted Philadelphia architect Walter Smedley.

The Inn at Pocono Manor burned down, following a wind driven fire around 6:30am on November 2, 2019. The exact cause of the fire is unknown.

== Gallery ==
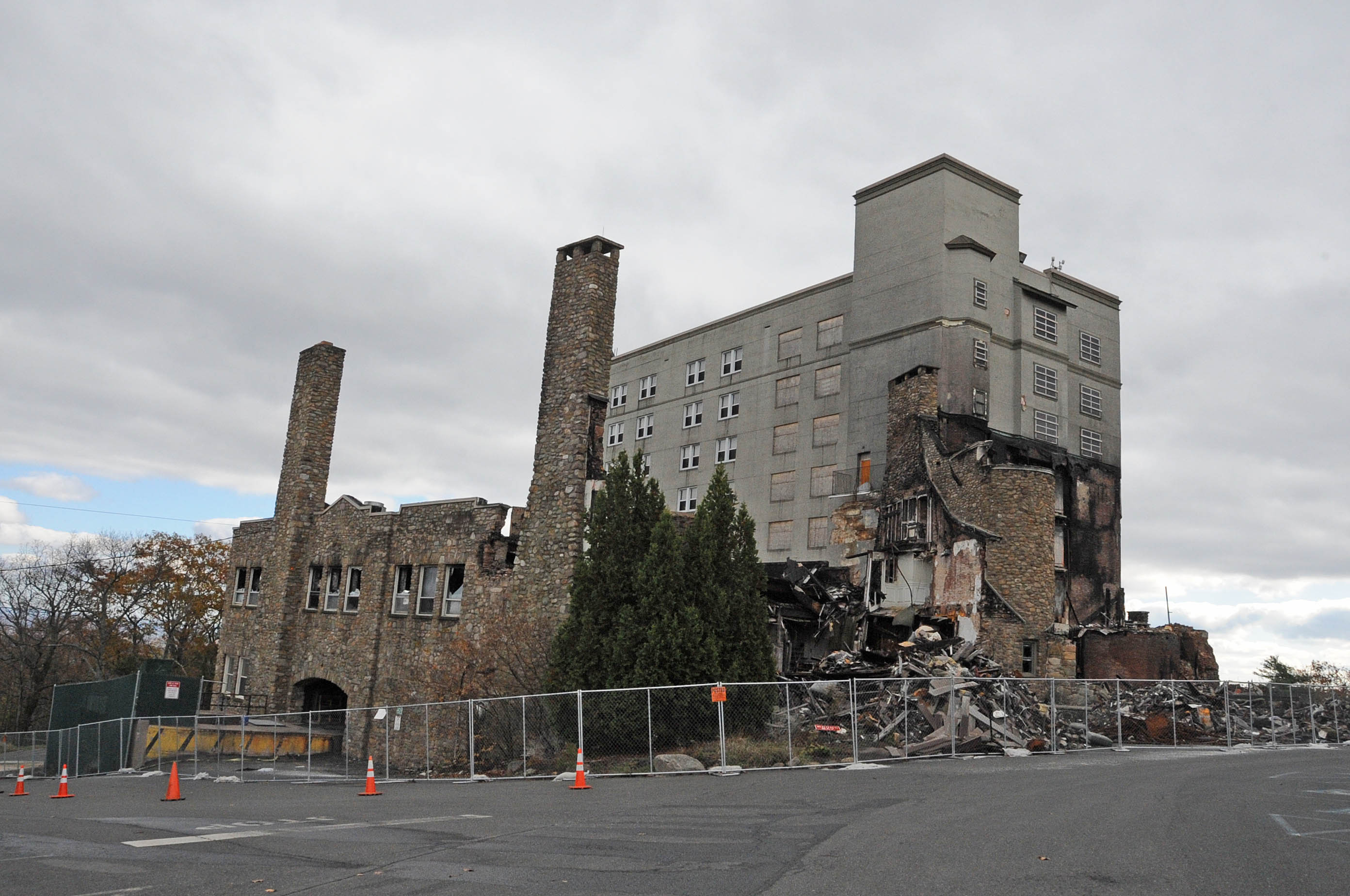
Pocono Manor after the 2019 fire
