= Kalahari Resorts =

American water park resort chain with African theme

- Interactive map of Kalahari Resorts
- Location: Wisconsin Dells, Wisconsin; Sandusky, Ohio; Pocono Manor, Pennsylvania; Round Rock, Texas; Spotsylvania Courthouse, Virginia
- Coordinates: 43.570178°N 89.772184°W, 41.382750°N 82.643977°W, 41.098621°N 75.390042°W, and 30.5197711°N 97.6336570°W
- Theme: African
- Owner: Todd Nelson
- Opened: 2000 (Wisconsin); 2005 (Sandusky); 2015 (Poconos); 2020 (Round Rock); 2026 (Spotsylvania)
- Operating season: Year-round (outdoor theme, water parks, and pools closed in the winter)
- Website: www.kalahariresorts.com

Kalahari Resorts and Conventions is a water park resort chain with five locations, in Wisconsin, Pennsylvania, Ohio, Texas and Virginia. Named for the Kalahari Desert in southern Africa, occupying eastern Namibia, western Botswana and northwestern South Africa, the resorts are heavily decorated with African animals and plants, and other African motifs.

Kalahari Resorts operates some of the largest indoor water parks in the United States. The Round Rock, Texas location has the largest indoor water park in the United States at 223,000 square feet (20,700 m^{2}), followed by the Pocono Mountains location's 220,000-square-foot (20,000 m^{2}) water park, the 173,000-square-foot (16,100 m^{2}) waterpark in Sandusky and the Wisconsin Dells' 125,000-square-foot (11,600 m^{2}) park. A Fredericksburg, Virginia location was in development until 2013, when it was scrapped after problems with financing. Kalahari later returned to Virginia and broke ground on their newest resort in Spotsylvania County, which opened in 2026.

Conventions held at the Kalahari Resorts are typically by state and regional organizations, such as the Wisconsin Network Conference on Alzheimer's Disease and Related Dementias in May 2014, Ohio Holstein Convention in February 2020, and Wisconsin District Ladies Ministries Retreat in April 2021.

== Locations ==
=== Wisconsin Dells ===
The Wisconsin Dells resort opened on May 4, 2000. It has 756 guest rooms, making it one of the larger resorts in the state. The convention center was expanded from 100,000-square-foot (9,300 m^{2}) to 230,000-square-foot (21,000 m^{2}) in 2011.

The indoor water park at Wisconsin Dells is the largest in Wisconsin, at 125,000 square feet (11,600 m^{2}). It was also America's largest indoor water park until the Kalahari Resort in Sandusky finished its indoor water park expansion in December 2007. The Wisconsin Dells resort's Indoor Waterpark is home to the first indoor uphill water coaster, named the Master Blaster, and first indoor FlowRider surfing simulator. In 2011, the indoor waterpark went through an expansion, which included America's first indoor Super Loop slides. Wisconsin Dells Kalahari also has a 77,000-square-foot (7,200 m^{2}) outdoor water park with several water slides, a lazy river, and a three-story interactive play structure.

In December 2008, the resort added Tom Foolery’s Adventure Park, a 110,000-square-foot (10,000 m^{2}) indoor theme park.

=== Sandusky ===
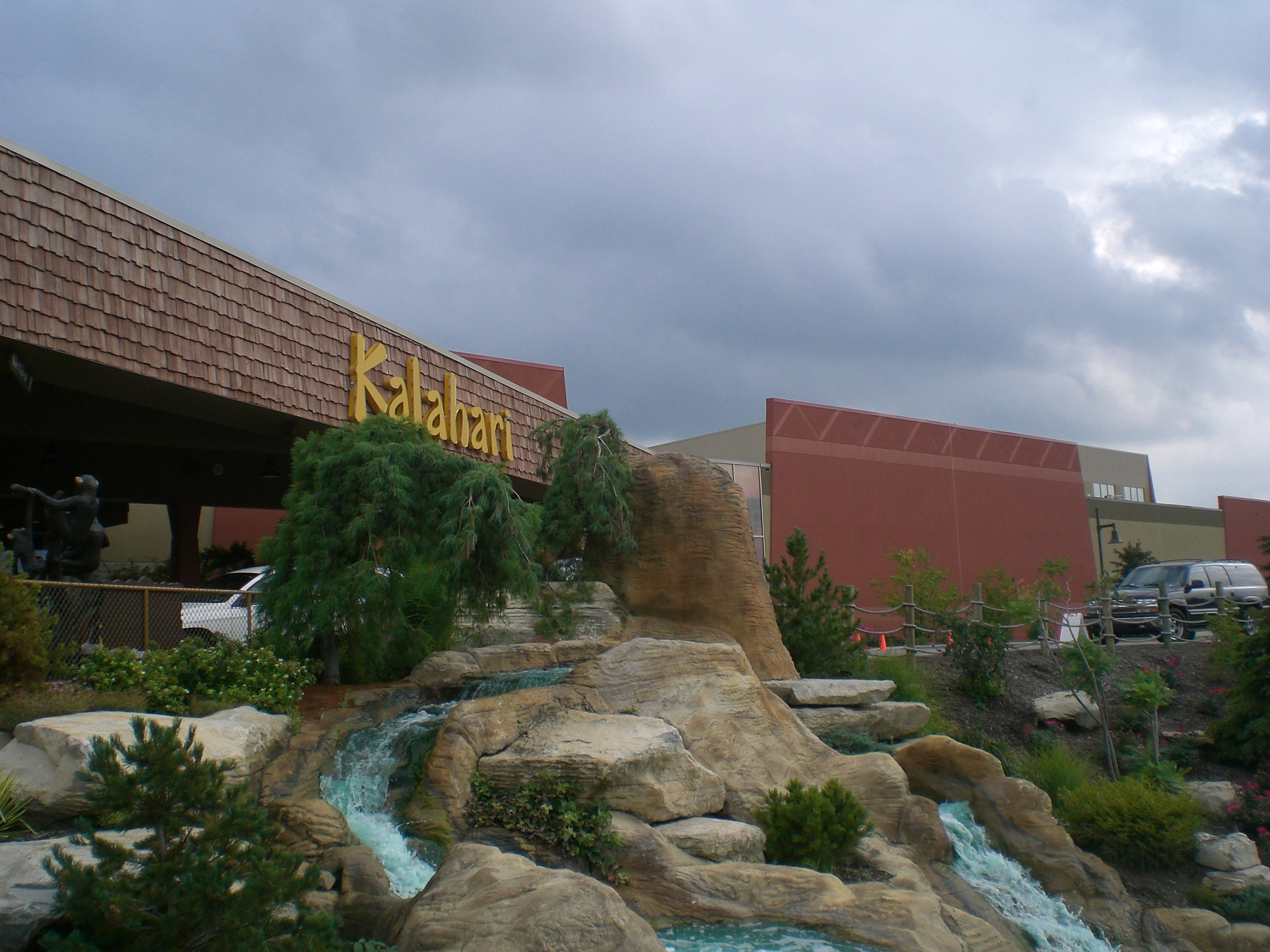
The outside of the Kalahari resort in Sandusky, Ohio

Opened on May 20, 2005, the Sandusky, Ohio, resort's waterpark is 173,000 square feet (16,100 m^{2}). In 2008, the resort expanded its 80,000 square feet (7,400 m^{2}) water park by 93,000 square feet (8,600 m^{2}), making it the largest indoor hotel water park at that time. The water park contains a FoilTec roof system that lets in natural light.

With 884 guest rooms, the hotel is the largest in the state of Ohio.

In August 2006, the resort opened a 100,000-square-foot (9,300 m^{2}) convention center that was later expanded to 215,000-square-foot (20,000 m^{2}).

On March 12, 2018, a section of HVAC ductwork fell from the ceiling of the indoor waterpark, injuring five people.

In 2019 and 2020, the resort made some minor updates to the property. A new outdoor mini-golf course was constructed, the Zip Coaster roller coaster-water slide hybrid was torn down, and the water basketball area was closed and replaced with underwater virtual reality.

=== Poconos ===
The Pocono Mountains, Pennsylvania, location opened on July 1, 2015, and completed an expansion in March 2017. It consists of a 220,000-square-foot (20,000 m^{2}) indoor waterpark, an outdoor waterpark, 230,000-square-foot (21,000 m^{2}) convention center, 977 guest rooms, and a 40,000-square-foot (3,700 m^{2}) arcade and entertainment center.

=== Round Rock ===
The Round Rock, Texas, location opened on November 12, 2020. It consists of a 223,000-square-foot (20,700 m^{2}) indoor waterpark (the second largest in the country), outdoor water park, 3 acres of outdoor pools, a 975-room hotel, five restaurants, 10,000 square feet of retail space and a 200,000 square-foot convention center. It is the first location to be in a metropolitan area instead of a resort town because the manager stated that "Round Rock has been one of the fastest-growing cities in the country and we took notice of that and as we started to look at our next development, it made sense we go south and what better place than the great state of Texas". On March 21, 2022, an EF2 tornado passed by, leaving no major structural damage at the resort.

=== Spotsylvania ===
A Spotsylvania Courthouse, Virginia, location will be located off the I-95 exit 118 at Thornburg. The water park opened on November 12, 2026.
