= List of indoor arenas in the United States =

This is a list of indoor arenas in the United States.

== Municipal and privately owned arenas by seating capacity ==
This is a list of seating capacities for sports and entertainment arenas in the United States with at least 1,000 seats. The list is composed mostly of arenas that house sports teams (basketball, ice hockey, arena soccer and arena football) and serve as indoor venues for concerts and expositions. The arenas in this table are ranked by maximum capacity. Domed stadiums (such as the Superdome in New Orleans and the U.S. Bank Stadium in Minneapolis) are excluded from this list.

Rows shaded in yellow indicates arena is permanent home to an NBA, NHL, or WNBA franchise.

#	Image	Arena/venue	City	State	Max.	Basket.	Hockey	Major tenant(s)	Open	Area
1		First Horizon Coliseum	Greensboro	North Carolina	23,500	22,000	18,947	UNC Greensboro Spartans (NCAA); Greensboro Gargoyles (ECHL)	1959	
2		United Center	Chicago	Illinois	23,500	20,917	19,717	Chicago Blackhawks (NHL); Chicago Bulls (NBA)	1994	Chicagoland
3		KFC Yum! Center	Louisville	Kentucky	23,084	22,090		Louisville Cardinals (NCAA)	2010	
4	Rupp Arena	Rupp Arena	Lexington	Kentucky	23,000	21,500	18,345	Kentucky Wildcats (NCAA)	1976	
5		Amerant Bank Arena	Sunrise	Florida	22,457	20,737	19,250	Florida Panthers (NHL)	1998	Miami metropolitan area
6		Xfinity Mobile Arena	Philadelphia	Pennsylvania	21,600	20,478	19,543	Philadelphia 76ers (NBA); Philadelphia Flyers (NHL); Philadelphia Wings (NLL)	1996	Greater Philadelphia
7		Benchmark International Arena	Tampa	Florida	21,500	20,500	19,204	Tampa Bay Lightning (NHL)	1996	Tampa Bay
8	Tacoma Dome (Tacoma, Washington)	Tacoma Dome	Tacoma	Washington	21,000	20,722	19,106		1983	Seattle-Tacoma area
9		Capital One Arena	Washington	District of Columbia	21,000	20,356	18,506	Washington Capitals (NHL); Washington Wizards (NBA); Georgetown Hoyas (NCAA)	1997	Washington–Baltimore metropolitan area
10		Little Caesars Arena	Detroit	Michigan	21,000	20,332	19,515	Detroit Red Wings (NHL); Detroit Pistons (NBA)	2017	
11	Scottrade Center 3Apr2005	Enterprise Center	St. Louis	Missouri	21,000	20,000	18,400	St. Louis Blues (NHL)	1994	Greater St. Louis
12		Lenovo Center	Raleigh	North Carolina	21,000	19,500	18,700	Carolina Hurricanes (NHL); NC State Wolfpack (NCAA)	1999	
13		Madison Square Garden	New York City	New York	20,789	19,812	18,006	New York Knicks (NBA); New York Rangers (NHL); St. John's Red Storm (NCAA)	1968	New York metropolitan area
14		Kaseya Center	Miami	Florida	20,000	19,600	14,447	Miami Heat (NBA)	1999	Miami metropolitan area
15		Ball Arena	Denver	Colorado	21,000	19,526	18,007	Colorado Avalanche (NHL); Denver Nuggets (NBA); Colorado Mammoth (NLL)	1999	Denver metropolitan area
16		Rocket Arena	Cleveland	Ohio	20,526	19,432	18,926	Cleveland Cavaliers (NBA); Cleveland Monsters (AHL)	1994	Cleveland-Akron
17		Moda Center	Portland	Oregon	20,500	19,400	18,280	Portland Trail Blazers (NBA); Portland Winterhawks (WHL)	1995	
18		Nationwide Arena	Columbus	Ohio	20,200	19,500	18,144	Columbus Blue Jackets (NHL)	2000	
19		Oakland Arena	Oakland	California	20,000	19,596	17,268		1966	Bay Area
20		American Airlines Center	Dallas	Texas	20,000	19,200	18,532	Dallas Mavericks (NBA); Dallas Stars (NHL)	2001	Dallas–Fort Worth metroplex
21		TD Garden	Boston	Massachusetts	20,000	19,156	17,565	Boston Bruins (NHL); Boston Celtics (NBA)	1995	Greater Boston
22		Target Center	Minneapolis	Minnesota	20,000	19,500	17,500	Minnesota Timberwolves (NBA); Minnesota Lynx (WNBA)	1990	Twin Cities
23		KeyBank Center	Buffalo	New York	20,000	19,200	19,070	Buffalo Sabres (NHL); Buffalo Bandits (NLL)	1996	
24		PPG Paints Arena	Pittsburgh	Pennsylvania	20,000	19,100	18,387	Pittsburgh Penguins (NHL)	2010	
25		Crypto.com Arena	Los Angeles	California	20,000	19,100	18,230	Los Angeles Kings (NHL); Los Angeles Lakers (NBA); Los Angeles Sparks (WNBA)	1999	Greater Los Angeles
26		Spectrum Center	Charlotte	North Carolina	20,000	19,077	14,100	Charlotte Hornets (NBA)	2005	
27		Kia Center	Orlando	Florida	20,000	19,073	17,353	Orlando Magic (NBA); Orlando Solar Bears (ECHL)	2010	
28		Grand Casino Arena	St. Paul	Minnesota	20,000	18,800	17,954	Minnesota Wild (NHL); Minnesota Frost (PWHL)	2000	Twin Cities
29	T-Mobile Arena Entrance	T-Mobile Arena	Paradise	Nevada	20,000	18,800	17,500	Vegas Golden Knights (NHL)	2016	
30		T-Mobile Center	Kansas City	Missouri	19,655	18,972	17,544		2007	
31	Energy Solutions Arena Interior	Delta Center	Salt Lake City	Utah	19,500	18,306	16,200	Utah Jazz (NBA); Utah Mammoth (NHL)	1991	
32		Chase Center	San Francisco	California	19,500	18,064		Golden State Warriors (NBA); Golden State Valkyries (WNBA)	2019	Bay Area
33		SAP Center at San Jose	San Jose	California	19,200	18,543	17,562	San Jose Sharks (NHL)	1993	Bay Area
34		Bridgestone Arena	Nashville	Tennessee	19,200	18,500	17,113	Nashville Predators (NHL)	1996	
35		BOK Center	Tulsa	Oklahoma	19,199	17,839	17,096	Tulsa Oilers (ECHL)	2008	
36		Freedom Hall	Louisville	Kentucky	19,169	18,865	17,062	Bellarmine Knights (NCAA)	1956	
37		Prudential Center	Newark	New Jersey	19,000	18,711	16,514	New Jersey Devils (NHL); New York Sirens (PWHL); Seton Hall Pirates (NCAA)	2007	New York metropolitan area
38		UBS Arena	Elmont	New York	19,000	17,975	17,113	New York Islanders (NHL)	2021	New York metropolitan area
39		Frost Bank Center	San Antonio	Texas	19,000	18,581	16,151	San Antonio Spurs (NBA)	2002	
40		Climate Pledge Arena	Seattle	Washington	19,000	18,500	17,100	Seattle Kraken (NHL); Seattle Storm (WNBA); Seattle Torrent (PWHL); Seattle Redhawks (NCAA)	1962	Seattle-Tacoma area
41		Desert Diamond Arena	Glendale	Arizona	19,000	18,300	17,125	Arizona Rattlers (IFL)	2003	Phoenix metropolitan area
42		Paycom Center	Oklahoma City	Oklahoma	19,000	18,203	15,154	Oklahoma City Thunder (NBA); Oklahoma City Blue (NBA G League)	2002	
43		Toyota Center	Houston	Texas	19,000	18,055	17,800	Houston Rockets (NBA)	2003	Greater Houston
44		Golden 1 Center	Sacramento	California	19,000	17,608	14,632	Sacramento Kings (NBA)	2016	
45		Barclays Center	Brooklyn	New York	19,000	17,732	15,795	Brooklyn Nets (NBA); New York Liberty (WNBA)	2012	New York metropolitan area
46	CenturyLink Center Omaha	CHI Health Center Omaha	Omaha	Nebraska	18,975	18,320	17,100	Creighton Bluejays (NCAA)	2003	
47		Honda Center	Anaheim	California	18,900	18,336	17,174	Anaheim Ducks (NHL)	1993	Greater Los Angeles
48		Smoothie King Center	New Orleans	Louisiana	18,700	18,600	16,500	New Orleans Pelicans (NBA)	1999	Greater New Orleans
49		Fiserv Forum	Milwaukee	Wisconsin	18,412	17,942	15,178	Milwaukee Bucks (NBA); Marquette Golden Eagles (NCAA)	2018	
50		Intuit Dome	Inglewood	California	18,370	17,972		Los Angeles Clippers (NBA)	2024	Greater Los Angeles
51		Gainbridge Fieldhouse	Indianapolis	Indiana	18,274	17,274	15,490	Indiana Pacers (NBA); Indiana Fever (WNBA)	1999	Indianapolis metropolitan area
52		Allstate Arena	Rosemont	Illinois	18,200	17,500	16,692	Chicago Wolves (AHL)	1979	Chicagoland
53		FedExForum	Memphis	Tennessee	18,119	16,667	12,633	Memphis Grizzlies (NBA); Memphis Tigers (NCAA)	2004	Memphis metropolitan area
54	AlltelArenaFromLittleRock	Simmons Bank Arena	North Little Rock	Arkansas	18,000	18,000	16,377		1999	
55		State Farm Arena	Atlanta	Georgia	18,000	17,744	17,624	Atlanta Hawks (NBA)	1999	Metro Atlanta
56		Legacy Arena	Birmingham	Alabama	18,000	17,654	16,850	Birmingham Squadron (NBA G League)	1976	
57		Mortgage Matchup Center	Phoenix	Arizona	18,000	17,017	16,210	Phoenix Suns (NBA); Phoenix Mercury (WNBA)	1992	Phoenix metropolitan area
58	Forum Inglewood	Kia Forum	Inglewood	California	18,000	17,505	16,005		1967	Greater Los Angeles
59		Heritage Bank Center	Cincinnati	Ohio	17,556	17,000	14,453	Cincinnati Cyclones (ECHL)	1975	
60		MVP Arena	Albany	New York	17,500	15,229	14,236	Siena Saints (NCAA)	1990	
61		MGM Grand Garden Arena	Paradise	Nevada	17,157	16,800	15,022		1993	
62	InTrust Bank Arena	Intrust Bank Arena	Wichita	Kansas	17,000	15,004	13,450	Wichita Thunder (ECHL); Wichita Force (CIF)	2010	
63		Casey's Center	Des Moines	Iowa	16,980	16,110	15,181	Iowa Wild (AHL); Iowa Wolves (NBA G League); Iowa Barnstormers (IFL)	2005	
64		PeoplesBank Arena	Hartford	Connecticut	16,606	16,294	15,635	Hartford Wolf Pack (AHL)	1975	
65	Cow Palace front 1	Cow Palace	Daly City	California	16,500	12,953	11,100		1941	Bay Area
66	Jacksonville Veterans Memorial Arena	VyStar Veterans Memorial Arena	Jacksonville	Florida	16,301	14,091	13,141	Jacksonville Icemen (ECHL); Jacksonville Sharks (NAL)	2003	
67	PinnacleBankArenaCourt	Pinnacle Bank Arena	Lincoln	Nebraska	16,130	14,970	12,700	Nebraska Cornhuskers (NCAA)	2013	
68		Pechanga Arena	San Diego	California	16,100	14,500	12,920	San Diego Gulls (AHL); San Diego Seals (NLL); San Diego Strike Force (IFL)	1966	
69		Bon Secours Wellness Arena	Greenville	South Carolina	16,000	14,897	13,707	Greenville Swamp Rabbits (ECHL)	1998	
70		Nassau Veterans Memorial Coliseum	Uniondale	New York	15,000	14,500	13,917	Long Island Nets (NBA G League); New York Riptide (NLL)	1972	New York metropolitan area
71	Mississippicoastcoliseu	Mississippi Coast Coliseum	Biloxi	Mississippi	15,000	10,200	9,150		1977	
72	DCU Center Worcester MA	DCU Center	Worcester	Massachusetts	14,802	13,726	12,239	Worcester Railers (ECHL)	1982	Greater Boston
73	2014 Boardwalk Hall 02	Boardwalk Hall	Atlantic City	New Jersey	14,500	11,100	10,900		1929	Greater Philadelphia
74	Arizona veterans memorial coliseum	Arizona Veterans Memorial Coliseum	Phoenix	Arizona	14,487	14,487	13,737		1965	Phoenix metropolitan area
75		Ariat Arena	Fort Worth	Texas	14,000	13,300	12,200		2019	Dallas–Fort Worth metroplex
76	CenturyTel Center	Brookshire Grocery Arena	Bossier City	Louisiana	14,000	13,000	12,440		2000	
77		Amica Mutual Pavilion	Providence	Rhode Island	14,000	12,400	11,075	Providence Bruins (AHL); Providence Friars (NCAA)	1972	Greater Boston
78	Mariner Center Baltimore	CFG Bank Arena	Baltimore	Maryland	14,000	11,614	10,582		1962	Washington–Baltimore metropolitan area
79	Rochester Blue Cross Arena – NW Exterior	Blue Cross Arena	Rochester	New York	14,000	12,428	11,215	Rochester Americans (AHL); Rochester Knighthawks (NLL)	1955	
80		Hampton Coliseum	Hampton	Virginia	13,800	10,147	7,940		1970	Hampton Roads
81	LBarena	Long Beach Arena	Long Beach	California	13,609	11,719	11,200		1962	Greater Los Angeles
82		Fort Worth Convention Center	Fort Worth	Texas	13,500	13,000	11,200		1968	Dallas–Fort Worth metroplex
83		Charleston Civic Center	Charleston	West Virginia	13,500	12,500	10,000		1959	
84		Cumberland County Crown Coliseum	Fayetteville	North Carolina	13,500	9,564	8,920	Fayetteville Marksmen (SPHL)	1997	
85	Richmond Coliseum	Richmond Coliseum	Richmond	Virginia	13,410	11,666	11,008		1971	
86	North Charleston Coliseum Aug2010	North Charleston Coliseum	North Charleston	South Carolina	13,295	11,475	10,568	South Carolina Stingrays (ECHL); Charleston Southern Buccaneers (NCAA)	1993	
87	Vanandel	Van Andel Arena	Grand Rapids	Michigan	13,184	11,500	10,834	Grand Rapids Griffins (AHL); Grand Rapids Gold (NBA G League)	1996	West Michigan
88		Ford Idaho Center	Nampa	Idaho	13,100	12,279		Idaho Horsemen (AWFC)	1997	
89		Gas South Arena	Duluth	Georgia	13,000	12,000	11,355	Atlanta Gladiators (ECHL); Georgia Swarm (NLL)	2003	Metro Atlanta
90	Memorial Coliseum Portland entrance canopy 2013	Memorial Coliseum	Portland	Oregon	13,000	12,888	10,407	Portland Winterhawks (WHL)	1960	
91		Denny Sanford Premier Center	Sioux Falls	South Dakota	13,000	12,400	10,678	Sioux Falls Storm (CIF); Sioux Falls Stampede (USHL)	2014	
92		Allen County War Memorial Coliseum	Fort Wayne	Indiana	13,000	11,083	10,480	Fort Wayne Komets (ECHL)	1952	
93		Maverik Center	West Valley City	Utah	12,600	11,500	10,100	Utah Grizzlies (ECHL)	1997	
94	Bojangles' Coliseum	Bojangles' Coliseum	Charlotte	North Carolina	12,500	11,666	9,605	Charlotte Checkers (AHL)	1955	
95		Garrett Coliseum	Montgomery	Alabama	12,500	11,540	10,420		1953	
96	GIANT Center	Giant Center	Hershey	Pennsylvania	12,500	11,000	10,500	Hershey Bears (AHL)	2002	
97	Peoria Civic Center	Peoria Civic Center	Peoria	Illinois	12,248	11,658	9,919	Peoria Rivermen (SPHL); Bradley Braves (NCAA)	1982	
98	Us cellular arena birdseye	UW–Milwaukee Panther Arena	Milwaukee	Wisconsin	12,200	11,052	9,652	Milwaukee Panthers (NCAA); Milwaukee Admirals (AHL); Milwaukee Wave (MASL)	1950	
99		Norfolk Scope	Norfolk	Virginia	12,000	10,253	8,700	Norfolk Admirals (ECHL)	1971	Hampton Roads
100		Michelob Ultra Arena	Paradise	Nevada	12,000			Las Vegas Aces (WNBA); Las Vegas Desert Dogs (NLL)	1999	
101	Tingley Coliseum, Albuquerque NM	Tingley Coliseum	Albuquerque	New Mexico	12,000	11,571	10,120	Duke City Gladiators (IFL)	1957	
102		Stockton Arena	Stockton	California	12,000	11,100	9,737	Stockton Kings (NBA G League)	2005	
103	The MARK of the Quad Cities	TaxSlayer Center	Moline	Illinois	12,000	10,700	9,810	Quad City Steamwheelers (IFL); Quad City Storm (SPHL)	1993	Quad Cities
104		First Interstate Arena	Billings	Montana	12,000	10,500	8,700		1975	
105	Baton Rouge River Center Arena	River Center Arena	Baton Rouge	Louisiana	12,000	9,400	8,120		1978	
106		Countryman Arena/TractorHouse Pavilion	Lincoln	Nebraska	12,000		5,448		2001	
107	SNHU Arena front	SNHU Arena	Manchester	New Hampshire	11,770	11,140	9,852		2001	Greater Boston
108		Expo Hall	Tampa	Florida	11,700		10,475		1976	Tampa Bay
109		Acrisure Arena	Palm Desert	California	11,679	10,815	9,918	Coachella Valley Firebirds (AHL)	2022	
110		Spokane Veterans Memorial Arena	Spokane	Washington	11,661	11,736	9,916	Spokane Chiefs (WHL); Spokane Shock (IFL)	1995	
111		Family Arena	St. Charles	Missouri	11,522	10,467	9,755	St. Louis Ambush (MASL)	1999	
112		Selland Arena	Fresno	California	11,300	10,132	10,120		1966	
113	Sears Centre	Now Arena	Hoffman Estates	Illinois	11,218	8,590	8,386	Chicago Mustangs (MASL); Windy City Bulls (NBA G League)	2006	Chicagoland
114	Metallica 2008 Ontario California	Toyota Arena	Ontario	California	11,089	10,832	9,584	Ontario Reign (AHL); Ontario Fury (MASL); Agua Caliente Clippers (NBA G League)	2008	Greater Los Angeles
115		Wintrust Arena	Chicago	Illinois	11,000	10,387		Chicago Sky (WNBA); DePaul Blue Demons (NCAA)	2017	Chicagoland
116		Ford Center	Evansville	Indiana	11,000	10,000	9,000	Evansville Thunderbolts (SPHL); Evansville Purple Aces (NCAA)	2011	
117		Jim Norick Arena	Oklahoma City	Oklahoma	10,944		9,000		1965	
118		Albany Civic Center	Albany	Georgia	10,711	8,267	6,570		1983	
119		Municipal Auditorium	Kansas City	Missouri	10,700	9,552	7,300		1936	
120		Mobile Civic Center	Mobile	Alabama	10,676	10,120	8,033		1966	
121		Berglund Center	Roanoke	Virginia	10,600	9,614	8,672	Roanoke Rail Yard Dawgs (SPHL)	1971	
122		Denver Coliseum	Denver	Colorado	10,500	9,340	8,140		1951	
123		PPL Center	Allentown	Pennsylvania	10,500		8,420	Lehigh Valley Phantoms (AHL); Lehigh Valley Steelhawks (NAL)	2014	
124		CURE Insurance Arena	Trenton	New Jersey	10,500	8,600	7,605		2000	
125		Silver Spurs Arena	Kissimmee	Florida	10,500		8,300		2003	
126		Rushmore Plaza Civic Center	Rapid City	South Dakota	10,400	9,400	8,000	Rapid City Rush (ECHL)	1977	
127		Hilliard Center	Corpus Christi	Texas	10,323	8,280	7,728		2004	
128		Stan Sheriff Center	Honolulu	Hawaii	10,300				1994	
129		Celeste Center	Columbus	Ohio	10,200				1992	
130		Resch Center	Green Bay	Wisconsin	10,200	9,729	8,709	Green Bay Blizzard (IFL); Green Bay Gamblers (USHL); Green Bay Phoenix (NCAA)	2002	
131		Bismarck Event Center	Bismarck	North Dakota	10,100	8,800	7,590		1969	
132		Landers Center	Southaven	Mississippi	10,045	8,362	8,400	Memphis Hustle (NBA G League)	2000	Memphis metropolitan area
133		Pensacola Bay Center	Pensacola	Florida	10,008	8,300	8,150	Pensacola Ice Flyers (SPHL)	1985	
134		Mohegan Sun Arena	Uncasville	Connecticut	10,000	9,323		Connecticut Sun (WNBA)	2001	
135		Angel of the Winds Arena	Everett	Washington	10,000	9,150	8,149	Everett Silvertips (WHL)	2003	Seattle-Tacoma area
136		BancorpSouth Arena	Tupelo	Mississippi	10,000	9,000	8,000		1993	
137		Columbus Civic Center	Columbus	Georgia	10,000	9,000	7,609	Columbus River Dragons (FPHL); Columbus Lions (NAL)	1996	
138		Florence Center	Florence	South Carolina	10,000	9,000	7,526		1993	
139		Mohegan Arena at Casey Plaza	Wilkes-Barre	Pennsylvania	10,000	9,700	8,050	Wilkes-Barre/Scranton Penguins (AHL)	1998	
140		Fort Bend Epicenter	Rosenberg	Texas	10,000		8,600		2023	Greater Houston
141		BMO Harris Bank Center	Rockford	Illinois	10,000	7,669	5,767	Rockford IceHogs (AHL)	1979	
142		D.C. Armory	Washington	District of Columbia	10,000				1941	Washington–Baltimore metropolitan area
143		Huntington Center	Toledo	Ohio	10,000	9,000	8,000	Toledo Walleye (ECHL)	2009	
144		Jostens Center	Lake Buena Vista	Florida	10,000				2008	
145		RP Funding Center	Lakeland	Florida	10,000	8,178	8,178	Lakeland Magic (NBA G League)	1974	
146		Landon Arena	Topeka	Kansas	10,000	7,777	7,777		1987	
147		Kay Yeager Coliseum	Wichita Falls	Texas	10,000	7,380	6,500	Wichita Falls Nighthawks (IFL)	2003	
148		Mississippi Coliseum	Jackson	Mississippi	10,000	6,812	6,500		1962	
149		Mechanics Bank Arena	Bakersfield	California	10,000	9,333	8,641	Bakersfield Condors (AHL)	1998	
150		Alliant Energy PowerHouse	Cedar Rapids	Iowa	10,000	7,200		Cedar Rapids River Kings (IFL)	1979	
151		Henderson Exposition Center	Lufkin	Texas	10,000	9,174	8,055		1983	
152		Total Mortgage Arena	Bridgeport	Connecticut	10,000	9,000	8,525	Bridgeport Islanders (AHL); Fairfield Stags (NCAA)	2001	New York metropolitan area
153		Amarillo National Center	Amarillo	Texas	10,000		5,000		2000	
154		Corteva Coliseum	Indianapolis	Indiana	9,939	9,479	8,100	IU Indy Jaguars (NCAA)	1939	Indianapolis metropolitan area
155		Alliant Energy Center	Madison	Wisconsin	9,762	9,131	7,426	Madison Capitols (USHL)	1967	
156		Ford Arena	Beaumont	Texas	9,737	9,100	8,200		2003	
157		Ford Wyoming Center	Casper	Wyoming	9,700		7,286		1982	
158		Freeman Coliseum	San Antonio	Texas	9,700		9,021		1950	
159		Tyson Events Center	Sioux City	Iowa	9,657	6,437	6,327	Sioux City Musketeers (USHL)	2003	
160		Nashville Municipal Auditorium	Nashville	Tennessee	9,654	8,000	7,500		1962	
161		Sames Auto Arena	Laredo	Texas	9,622	8,665	8,065		2001	
162		Savannah Civic Center	Savannah	Georgia	9,600	7,500	6,846		1974	
163		Fair Park Coliseum	Dallas	Texas	9,552		7,513		1936	Dallas–Fort Worth metroplex
164		The Wigwam	Anderson	Indiana	9,500	8,640			1961	Indianapolis metropolitan area
165		Miami Beach Convention Center	Miami Beach	Florida	9,500				1957	
166		Enmarket Arena	Savannah	Georgia	9,500	6,474	6,082	Savannah Ghost Pirates (ECHL)	2022	
167		Ocean Center	Daytona Beach	Florida	9,440	8,362	6,176		1985	
168		Luedecke Arena	Austin	Texas	9,400	8,265	7,344		1983	
169		Taylor Telecom Arena	Abilene	Texas	9,353	8,563	7,278		2010s	
170		Macon Coliseum	Macon	Georgia	9,252	8,500	7,182	Macon Mayhem (SPHL)	1968	
171		Kay Bailey Hutchison Convention Center	Dallas	Texas	9,200		7,428		1957	Dallas–Fort Worth metroplex
172		Anaheim Convention Center	Anaheim	California	9,100	8,700	7,500		1967	Greater Los Angeles
173		Hill Exhibit Hall	Albuquerque	New Mexico	9,048	8,250	7,136			
174		Orleans Arena	Las Vegas	Nevada	9,037	8,193	7,773	Henderson Silver Knights (AHL); Las Vegas Legends (MASL)	2003	
175		Burton Coliseum	Lake Charles	Louisiana	9,000	8,500			1977	
176		Portland Expo Center Hall E	Portland	Oregon	9,000	8,400	7,280		1997	
177		Sevierville Convention Center	Sevierville	Tennessee	9,000	8,175	7,064		2022	
178		Cross Insurance Arena	Portland	Maine	9,000	6,746	6,733	Maine Mariners (ECHL)	1977	
179		Extraco Events Center	Waco	Texas	9,000	6,000	5,600		1953	
180		Mid-America Center	Council Bluffs	Iowa	9,000	7,800	6,700		2002	
181		Santander Arena	Reading	Pennsylvania	9,000	8,000	7,083	Reading Royals (ECHL)	2001	Greater Philadelphia
182		Von Braun Center	Huntsville	Alabama	9,000	7,198	6,602	Huntsville Havoc (SPHL); Alabama–Huntsville Chargers (NCAA)	1975	
183		Broadmoor World Arena	Colorado Springs	Colorado	9,000	8,099	7,343	Colorado College Tigers (NCAA)	1997	
184		Bert Ogden Arena	Edinburg	Texas	9,000	7,838		Rio Grande Valley Vipers (NBA G League)	2018	
185		SeaGate Convention Centre	Toledo	Ohio	9,000	5,000	3,218		1987	
186		Empire Expo Center	Geddes	New York	9,000	4,000	4,000		1927	
187		Seaboard Triumph Expo Center	Sioux City	Iowa	8,973	8,016	6,290		2020	
188		Tucson Convention Center	Tucson	Arizona	8,962	7,712	6,791	Tucson Roadrunners (AHL)	1971	
189		Bank of Springfield Center	Springfield	Illinois	8,900				1978	
190		Neal S. Blaisdell Center	Honolulu	Hawaii	8,733	7,775	6,500		1964	
191		H-E-B Center	Cedar Park	Texas	8,700	8,000	6,863	Texas Stars (AHL); Austin Spurs (NBA G League)	2009	
192		Kitsap Sun Pavilion	Bremerton	Washington	8,676	3,664	2,684		2009	
193		Sullivan Arena	Anchorage	Alaska	8,674	7,900	6,399	Anchorage Wolverines (NAHL)	1983	
194		Grand Park Events Center	Westfield	Indiana	8,592		5,982		2016	Indianapolis metropolitan area
195		Mountain Health Arena	Huntington	West Virginia	8,500	6,785	5,771		1976	
196		AMSOIL Arena	Duluth	Minnesota	8,500	7,200	6,600	Minnesota Duluth Bulldogs (NCAA)	2010	
197		Hertz Arena	Estero	Florida	8,500	7,128	7,081	Florida Everblades (ECHL)	1998	
198		Golden Spike Arena	Ogden	Utah	8,500		6,500		1988	
199		NRG Arena	Houston	Texas	8,500	6,500	6,000		1974	Greater Houston
200		Pine Bluff Convention Center	Pine Bluff	Arkansas	8,500	5,000			1976	
201		Alltech Arena	Lexington	Kentucky	8,500	7,540	5,512		2009	
202		Akins Ford Arena	Athens	Georgia	8,500		5,500	UGA Ice Dawgs hockey (SECHC)	2024	
203		The Oil Palace	Tyler	Texas	8,300	6,960	6,500		1983	
204		Reaves Arena	Perry	Georgia	8,250	5,002			1990	
205		Southwest Motors Events Center	Pueblo	Colorado	8,225				1995	
206		Mayo Clinic Health System Event Center	Mankato	Minnesota	8,200	5,705	5,280	Minnesota State Mavericks (NCAA)	1995	
207		MassMutual Center	Springfield	Massachusetts	8,177	7,525	6,789	Springfield Thunderbirds (AHL); American International (NCAA)	1972	
208		Memorial Coliseum	Farmington, New Mexico	New Mexico	8,137		5,137			
209		Allen Event Center	Allen	Texas	8,100	7,080	6,225	Allen Americans (ECHL); Dallas Sidekicks (MASL)	2009	Dallas–Fort Worth metroplex
210		AdventHealth Arena	Lake Buena Vista	Florida	8,000	8,000			2018	
211		Bell County Expo Center	Belton	Texas	8,000		6,559		1987	
212		Chisholm Trail Coliseum	Enid	Oklahoma	8,000	6,000			1998	
213		Ector County Coliseum	Odessa	Texas	8,000		5,131		1954	
214		Hersheypark Arena	Hershey	Pennsylvania	8,000		7,286		1936	
215		La Crosse Center	La Crosse	Wisconsin	8,000	6,000	5,500		1980	
216		Upstate Medical University Arena at Onondaga County War Memorial	Syracuse	New York	8,000	7,200	6,159	Syracuse Crunch (AHL)	1951	
217		ShoWare Center	Kent	Washington	8,000	6,500	6,150	Seattle Thunderbirds (WHL); Tacoma Stars (MASL)	2008	Seattle-Tacoma area
218		Sioux Falls Arena	Sioux Falls	South Dakota	8,000	6,400	4,764		1961	
219		Sudduth Coliseum	Lake Charles	Louisiana	8,000	7,450	7,450		1972	
220		Grossinger Motors Arena	Bloomington	Illinois	8,000	6,900	5,600	Central Illinois Flying Aces (USHL)	2006	
221		Will Rogers Coliseum	Fort Worth	Texas	8,000		5,694		1936	Dallas–Fort Worth metroplex
222		Minneapolis Armory	Minneapolis	Minnesota	8,000	4,750	3,800		1936	Twin Cities
223		Farm Credit Dairy Center	Tulare	California	7,900	6,910	5,930			
224		Erie Insurance Arena	Erie	Pennsylvania	7,838	6,654	5,486	Erie Otters (OHL)	1983	
225		Nacogdoches County Expo Center	Nacogdoches	Texas	7,820	6,660	5,772			
226		Allen County Memorial Expo Center	Fort Wayne	Indiana	7,800	6,720	6,500		1989	
227		Lee County Civic Center	Fort Myers	Florida	7,800				1978	
228		Salt Lake County Equestrian Center	Sandy	Utah	7,800	7,032	5,800			
229		WesBanco Arena	Wheeling	West Virginia	7,800		5,406	Wheeling Nailers (ECHL)	1981	
230		First Interstate Bank Center	Redmond	Oregon	7,800	5,000	4,000			
231		Yakima SunDome	Yakima	Washington	7,782	5,602	5,686		1990	
232		South Point Arena	Las Vegas	Nevada	7,725	7,005	6,025		2006	
233		Toyota Center	Kennewick	Washington	7,715		5,780	Tri-City Americans (WHL)	1988	Tri-Cities
234		Callicott Arena	Franklin	Tennessee	7,680	7,120	5,280			
235		John Hancock Arena	Altamont	Oregon	7,680	6,912	5,680			
236		Harrah's Cherokee Center	Asheville	North Carolina	7,674	6,000	5,200		1939	
237		Dow Event Center	Saginaw	Michigan	7,647	6,217	5,527	Saginaw Spirit (OHL)	1972	
238		Agricenter Showplace Arena	Memphis	Tennessee	7,625	6,905	5,925		1986	Memphis metropolitan area
239		Dorton Arena	Raleigh	North Carolina	7,610	7,500	5,110		1952	
240		Monroe Civic Center	Monroe	Louisiana	7,600	6,000	4,712		1965	
241		Pennsylvania Farm Show; Complex & Expo Center	Harrisburg	Pennsylvania	7,600	7,600	7,318	Harrisburg Heat (MASL)	1939	
242		Tony's Pizza Events Center	Salina	Kansas	7,583	6,533	5,225		1978	
243		Harding Mazzotti Arena	Glens Falls	New York	7,562	5,475	4,806	Adirondack Thunder (ECHL)	1979	
244		Frontwave Arena	Oceanside	California	7,500	6,550	5,900	San Diego Clippers (NBA G League); San Diego Sockers (MASL); San Diego Strike Force (IFL)	2024	
245		Butte Civic Center	Butte	Montana	7,500	6,250	5,100		1952	
246		Brown Convention Center	Houston	Texas	7,500	6,008	5,460		1987	Greater Houston
247		Humble Civic Center Arena	Humble	Texas	7,500	5,000			1995	Greater Houston
248		Hutchinson Sports Arena	Hutchinson	Kansas	7,500	7,500			1952	
249		Eihusen Arena	Grand Island	Nebraska	7,500	6,000		Nebraska Danger (IFL)	2006	
250		Lone Star Expo Center	Conroe	Texas	7,500		5,000		2002	Greater Houston
251		Reno Events Center	Reno	Nevada	7,500				2005	
252		Rio Rancho Events Center	Rio Rancho	New Mexico	7,500	6,500	6,100		2006	
253		Fishers Event Center	Fishers	Indiana	7,500			Fishers Freight (IFL); Indy Fuel (ECHL); Indy Ignite (PVF)	2024	Indianapolis metropolitan area
254		Arnold Hall/Reilly Coliseum	Miami	Florida	7,460	6,288	5,540			
255		Adams Arena	Fort Pierce	Florida	7,285		4,785			
256		National Western Complex Events Center	Denver	Colorado	7,277	6,877	4,777		1990	
257		Budweiser Events Center	Loveland	Colorado	7,200	7,200	5,289	Colorado Eagles (AHL); Colorado Crush (IFL)	2003	
258		Leonard E. Merrill Center	Katy	Texas	7,200	6,200	5,600		2005	Greater Houston
259		Mayo Civic Center	Rochester	Minnesota	7,200	5,400	5,400		1984	
260		Knoxville Civic Coliseum	Knoxville	Tennessee	7,141	5,583	4,973	Knoxville Ice Bears (SPHL)	1961	
261		Escambia County Equestrian Center	Pensacola	Florida	7,125	6,405	5,425		2002	
262		Quillen Arena	Harrington	Delaware	7,116	6,348	5,140		1997	
263		Owensboro Sportscenter	Owensboro	Kentucky	7,100	5,500			1949	
264		Oceanfront Arena	Wildwood	New Jersey	7,090	6,090	4,732		2001	Greater Philadelphia
265		Bill Graham Civic Auditorium	San Francisco	California	7,000	6,000			1915	Bay Area
266		Cooper Steel Arena	Shelbyville	Tennessee	7,000	6,559	5,959		1989	
267		Mesquite Arena	Mesquite	Texas	7,000	6,040	5,300		1985	Dallas–Fort Worth metroplex
268		Visions Veterans Memorial Arena	Binghamton	New York	7,000	5,000	4,710	Binghamton Black Bears (FPHL)	1973	
269		Appalachian Wireless Arena	Pikeville	Kentucky	7,000	5,400	4,500		2004	
270		Genesis Convention Center	Gary	Indiana	7,000	6,300			1981	Chicagoland
271		Cable Dahmer Arena	Independence	Missouri	7,000	6,000	5,800	Kansas City Mavericks (ECHL); Missouri Comets (MASL)	2009	
272		The Hippodrome	Waterloo	Iowa	7,000	6,000	5,155		1936	
273		Taft Coliseum	Columbus	Ohio	7,000	5,676	5,003		1918	
274		Oregon State Fairgrounds Pavilion	Salem	Oregon	7,000		5,000		2004	
275		Scheels Arena	Fargo	North Dakota	7,000	6,000	5,000	Fargo Force (USHL)	2008	
276		Majestic Valley Arena	Kalispell	Montana	7,000	5,992	4,800		2002	
277		Hard Rock Live at Etess Arena	Atlantic City	New Jersey	7,000	6,200	4,600		1990	Greater Philadelphia
278		Moody Gardens Exposition Hall	Galveston	Texas	7,000	6,160	4,300		1987	Greater Houston
279		Minneapolis Convention Center	Minneapolis	Minnesota	7,000	6,120	5,248		1990	Twin Cities
280		Comerica Center	Frisco	Texas	7,000	4,500	3,500	Texas Legends (NBA G League)	2003	Dallas–Fort Worth metroplex
281		Henderson Exposition Center	Lufkin	Texas	6,950	6,950	6,950		1983	
282		Lea County Event Center	Hobbs	New Mexico	6,935		6,071			
283		Battelle Hall	Columbus	Ohio	6,864				1980	
284		Salem Civic Center	Salem	Virginia	6,820	5,100	4,500		1967	
285		Idaho Central Arena	Boise	Idaho	6,800	5,300	5,002	Idaho Steelheads (ECHL)	1997	
286		Payne Arena	Hidalgo	Texas	6,800	5,700	5,500		2003	
287		Dixie Center	St. George	Utah	6,785	6,200			1998	
288		Augusta Civic Center	Augusta	Maine	6,777	5,099			1973	
289		Wicomico Youth and Civic Center	Salisbury	Maryland	6,747	5,130	4,157		1969	
290		Claremore Expo Center	Claremore	Oklahoma	6,693	5,829	4,652			
291		Amarillo Civic Center	Amarillo	Texas	6,670	4,870	4,870		1964	
292		Broadbent Arena	Louisville	Kentucky	6,600	6,600	5,261		1974	
293		Lamar Dixon Expo Center	Gonzales	Louisiana	6,600	6,832	4,760		1999	
294		Farm Bureau Expo Center	Lebanon	Tennessee	6,600	5,540	4,000			
295		Jamestown Civic Center	Jamestown	North Dakota	6,597		5,500		1973	
296		Foley Event Center	Foley	Alabama	6,573	4,076	3,740			
297		Ike Hamilton Expo Center	West Monroe	Louisiana	6,560	6,019	5,176			
298		Foster Communications Coliseum	San Angelo	Texas	6,548	5,260	4,898		1958	
299		Carlson Center	Fairbanks	Alaska	6,539	5,703	4,595		1990	
300		Rapides Parish Coliseum	Alexandria	Louisiana	6,512	5,868	5,477		1965	
301		Beaumont Civic Center	Beaumont	Texas	6,500				1978	
302		Cooper Steel Arena	Shelbyville	Tennessee	6,500	6,090	5,600			
303		Jacksonville Equestrian Center	Jacksonville	Florida	6,500	5,968	5,380		2004	
304		Jim R. Miller Event Center	Marietta	Georgia	6,500	5,764	5,000			Metro Atlanta
305		Corteva Agriscience Center	Tulare	California	6,500	5,632	4,300		1982	
306		Four States Arena	Texarkana	Texas	6,500	5,600	4,794		1953	
307		Hartman Arena	Park City	Kansas	6,500	5,500	4,700	Wichita B-52s (MASL); Wichita Force (CIF)	2008	
308		Kellogg Arena	Battle Creek	Michigan	6,500	4,675			1980	
309		Sacramento Convention Center	Sacramento	California	6,500				1927	
310		Viking Hall	Bristol	Tennessee	6,500	6,100			1977	
311		Star of the Desert Arena	Primm	Nevada	6,500	5,540	4,900		1994	
312		Dort Federal Credit Union Event Center	Flint	Michigan	6,469	4,421	4,365	Flint Firebirds (OHL)	1969	
313		Corbin Arena	Corbin	Kentucky	6,444		4,954		2009	
314		DECC Arena	Duluth	Minnesota	6,441		4,741		1966	
315		Rava Equestrian Center	King City	California	6,400	5,632	4,300			
316		Miller Expo Centre	Essex Junction	Vermont	6,400	5,400	4,175		2000	
317		Trinity Health Arena	Muskegon	Michigan	6,396	6,000	5,100	Muskegon Lumberjacks (USHL)	1960	West Michigan
318		Legacy Event Center	Farmington	Utah	6,360	5,592	4,400			
319		Expo Square Pavilion	Tulsa	Oklahoma	6,311	5,039		Tulsa Revolution (MASL)	1937	
320		Covelli Centre	Youngstown	Ohio	6,300	5,900	5,717	Youngstown Phantoms (USHL)	2005	
321		Wings Event Center	Kalamazoo	Michigan	6,300		5,123	Kalamazoo Wings (ECHL)	1974	West Michigan
322		Schaumburg Convention Center	Schaumburg	Illinois	6,300	5,760	4,812			Chicagoland
323		Wilson Logistics Arena	Springfield	Missouri	6,300		4,500	Ozarks Lunkers (TAL)	2024	
324		Horse Palace	Spring Creek	Nevada	6,300	5,280	4,300		1973	
325		Reno-Sparks Livestock Events Center	Reno	Nevada	6,200		6,200			
326		Bank OZK Arena	Hot Springs	Arkansas	6,200	6,000			2003	
327		Stormont Vail Exhibition Hall	Topeka	Kansas	6,200	5,440	4,636		1987	
328		Findlay Toyota Center	Prescott Valley	Arizona	6,200	5,100	4,810		2006	
329		Four Seasons Arena	Great Falls	Montana	6,165	4,895	4,895		1979	
330		Norton Healthcare Sports and Learning Center	Louisville	Kentucky	6,136	6,030	4,100		2021	
331		Legacy Events Center	Farmington	Utah	6,040	5,272	4,200			
332		Arthur Ashe Athletic Center	Richmond	Virginia	6,000	6,000	6,000		1982	
333		F&M Bank Arena	Clarksville	Tennessee	6,000	5,500	5,000	Austin Peay State Governors (NCAA)	2023	
334		Bill Harris Arena	Birmingham	Alabama	6,000				1980	
335		Boutwell Memorial Auditorium	Birmingham	Alabama	6,000	5,000			1924	
336		Cambria County War Memorial Arena	Johnstown	Pennsylvania	6,000	5,000	3,725		1950	
337		El Paso County Coliseum	El Paso	Texas	6,000	5,600	5,100		1942	
338		Xtream Arena	Coralville	Iowa	6,000		5,100	Iowa Heartlanders (ECHL)	2021	
339		Hero Arena	Idaho Falls	Idaho	6,000	5,120	4,000	Idaho Falls Spud Kings (USPHL)	2022	
340		Louisville Gardens	Louisville	Kentucky	6,000				1905	
341		Tunica Arena and Exposition Center	Tunica	Mississippi	6,000				2000	
342		Dollar Loan Center	Henderson	Nevada	6,000			Henderson Silver Knights (AHL)	2022	
343		Kansas Star Arena	Mulvane	Kansas	6,000		3,400			
344		Williams Sportsplex	Hampton	Virginia	6,000	4,000			2008	
345		Murieta Equestrian Center	Rancho Cordova	California	5,904	4,992	4,304			
346		Big E Coliseum	West Springfield	Massachusetts	5,900		5,513		1926	
347		The Show Place Arena	Upper Marlboro	Maryland	5,892	5,100	5,100		1993	Washington–Baltimore metropolitan area
348		Roy Wilkins Auditorium	St. Paul	Minnesota	5,844	4,504	3,644		1932	Twin Cities
349		Cross Insurance Center	Bangor	Maine	5,800	8,500	5,800	Maine Black Bears (NCAA)	2013	
350		Town Toyota Center	Wenatchee	Washington	5,800	5,000	4,300	Wenatchee Wild (WHL)	2008	
351		Lee & Rose Warner Coliseum	Falcon Heights	Minnesota	5,785		5,000		1951	
352		Summit County Arena	Tallmadge	Ohio	5,734	4,934	3,781			
353		Adirondack Bank Center	Utica	New York	5,700	4,500	3,815	Utica Comets (AHL); Utica City FC (MASL)	1959	
354		Oman Arena	Jackson	Tennessee	5,600	4,900			1968	
355		McAllen Convention Center	McAllen	Texas	5,600	2,805	2,805		2007	
356		Utz Arena	York	Pennsylvania	5,500	5,500	5,500		2003	
357		United Wireless Arena	Dodge City	Kansas	5,500		5,500	Dodge City Law (CIF)	2011	
358		ION International Training Center	Leesburg	Virginia	5,500	4,725	3,500		2019	Washington–Baltimore metropolitan area
359		LandMark Implement Arena	Kearney	Nebraska	5,500	4,530	3,550		2010	
360		Veterans Memorial Coliseum	Marion	Ohio	5,500	4,490	3,200		1949	
361		Kaiser Convention Center	Oakland	California	5,492				1914	Bay Area
362		Hibbing Memorial Building	Hibbing	Minnesota	5,460		4,460		1935	
363		St. John Arena	Steubenville	Ohio	5,400	5,200			1960	
364		West-Cal Arena	Sulphur	Louisiana	5,400	4,360	3,440			
365		Hobart Arena	Troy	Ohio	5,332		3,832		1950	
366		Mojave Crossing	Fort Mohave	Arizona	5,300		3,300			
367		All Seasons Arena	Minot	North Dakota	5,300	2,900	2,850		1987	
368		Lane Events Center	Eugene	Oregon	5,285	3,060	2,080			
369		Shipley Arena	Westminster	Maryland	5,250	4,530	3,550			
370		Seven Feathers Event Center	Central Point	Oregon	5,216	4,448	3,340			
371		Hammond Civic Center	Hammond	Indiana	5,200	4,500			1938	Chicagoland
372		Five Flags Civic Center	Dubuque	Iowa	5,200	4,000			1979	
373		KCI Expo Center	Kansas City	Missouri	5,200	3,925	3,392			
374		Canton Memorial Civic Center	Canton	Ohio	5,200	3,900	3,500		1951	
375		Big Boy Arena	Fraser	Michigan	5,200		3,500		1964	
376		Sunnyview Covered Arena	Oshkosh	Wisconsin	5,120	4,352	3,100			
377		Garwood Arena	Columbiana	Ohio	5,120	4,352	3,100			
378		Special Events Center, East Wing	Greensboro	North Carolina	5,100	4,500			1993	
379		Baldwin Pavilion	Lakeport	California	5,100	4,236	3,060		1988	
380		Forrest County Multipurpose Center	Hattiesburg	Mississippi	5,086		2,586			
381		Canadian County Expo Center	El Reno	Oklahoma	5,040	4,080	2,904			
382		Edwards Hall	Miami	Florida	5,038				1952	
383		Northeast Event Center	Columbia	Missouri	5,032	4,432	2,992			
384		Northeast Alabama Agri-Business Center	Rainsville	Alabama	5,030	4,646	4,055		2011	
385		Ice Box	Lincoln	Nebraska	5,010		4,212	Lincoln Stars (USHL)	1951	
386		Meadowlands Exposition Center	Secaucus	New Jersey	5,000	5,000	4,000			New York metropolitan area
387		Cedar Point Sports Center	Sandusky	Ohio	5,000				2019	
388		Expo Center at the South Florida Fairgrounds	West Palm Beach	Florida	5,000				2002	
389		Virginia Beach Sports Center	Virginia Beach	Virginia	5,000				2020	Hampton Roads
390		Island Grove Events Center	Greeley	Colorado	5,000	4,080	3,296		2006	
391		Viaero Event Center	Kearney	Nebraska	5,000	4,047	4,047	Tri-City Storm (USHL)	2000	
392		Black River Coliseum	Poplar Bluff	Missouri	5,000				1999	
393		LECOM Event Center	Elmira	New York	5,000		3,794	Elmira Enforcers (FPHL)	2000	
394		Hale Arena	Kansas City	Missouri	5,000	5,000			1992	
395		Houma Terrebonne Civic Center	Houma	Louisiana	5,000				1999	
396		Houston County Farm Center	Dothan	Alabama	5,000				1967	
397		Minot Municipal Auditorium	Minot	North Dakota	5,000	4,000	4,000		1954	
398		Roland E. Powell Convention Center	Ocean City	Maryland	5,000				1997	
399		Taylor County Expo Center	Abilene	Texas	5,000	5,000	5,000		1973	
400		Westchester County Center	White Plains	New York	5,000	5,000		Westchester Knicks (NBA G League)	1924	New York metropolitan area
401		Lifetime Activities Center	Taylorsville	Utah	5,000	5,000		Salt Lake City Stars (NBA G League)	1996	
402		Main Street Armory	Rochester	New York	5,000	4,000			1905	
403		Del Mar Arena	Del Mar	California	5,000		3,554		2009	
404		Damus Pavilion	San Bernardino	California	5,000	4,000	3,400			Greater Los Angeles
405		Gateway Center Arena	College Park	Georgia	5,000	3,500		Atlanta Dream (WNBA); College Park Skyhawks (NBA G League)	2019	Metro Atlanta
406		Pelham Civic Center	Pelham	Alabama	5,000		3,500	Birmingham Bulls (SPHL)	N/A	
407		Turning Stone Events Center	Verona	New York	5,000	4,142	3,497		1995	
408		Camp Jordan Arena	Chattanooga	Tennessee	5,000		3,300		1993	
409		Aldrich Arena	Maplewood	Minnesota	5,000	4,180	3,200			
410		Robarts Arena	Sarasota	Florida	5,000	3,176			1967	Tampa Bay
411		Presque Isle Forum	Presque Isle	Maine	5,000	4,080	3,100			
412		FireLake Arena	Shawnee	Oklahoma	5,000	4,200	3,000			
413		Odeum Expo Center	Villa Park	Illinois	5,000		2,400		1981	Chicagoland
414		Classic Center	Athens	Georgia	5,000	4,100	2,000		1995	Metro Atlanta
415		Tahoe Blue Event Center	Stateline	Nevada	5,000	4,700	4,200	Tahoe Knight Monsters (ECHL)	2023	
416		East Grand Forks Civic Center	East Grand Forks	Minnesota	4,900	3,975	3,300		1974	
417		Deseret Peak Indoor Arena	Tooele	Utah	4,816	4,048	2,940			
418		Lamar County Multipurpose Center	Purvis	Mississippi	4,800	4,100	3,100		1999	
419		Hocklander Hall	Mobile	Alabama	4,800	4,000	2,620			
420		Ft. Smith Convention Center	Fort Smith	Arkansas	4,800	3,932	2,760			
421		Champions Center	Springfield	Ohio	4,760	4,085	3,074		2004	
422		Schroeder Expo Center	Paducah	Kentucky	4,752	3,556	2,562			
423		David S. Palmer Arena	Danville	Illinois	4,750	4,750	2,350	Vermilion County Bobcats (SPHL)	1980	
424		Century II Performing Arts & Convention Center	Wichita	Kansas	4,700				1969	
425		Erie Fairgrounds Event Center	Hamburg	New York	4,700	3,424	3,000		1990	
426		Lauderdale County Agri-Center	Meridian	Mississippi	4,625	3,905	2,925			
427		Calpooia Arena	Albany	Oregon	4,556	3,791	2,256			
428		USA Hockey Arena	Plymouth	Michigan	4,500		3,504	USA NTDP (USHL)	1996	
429		Springfield Expo Center	Springfield	Missouri	4,500	3,720	2,740			
430		Jacobson Exhibition Center	Des Moines	Iowa	4,500	3,400	3,300		2010	
431		Midland County Horseshoe	Midland	Texas	4,500	3,668	3,200		2006	
432		Grand Wayne Convention Hall	Fort Wayne	Indiana	4,500	3,424	2,750		2005	
433		The Colisée	Lewiston	Maine	4,500		2,634	Lewiston Maineiacs (USPHL)	1958	
434		Ruby Community Center	Morgantown	West Virginia	4,500	3,680	2,528		2001	
435		Henrico Sports and Events Center	Glen Allen	Virginia	4,500	3,500			2023	
436		Topo Ranch Center	King City	California	4,400	3,824	3,040			
437		Stock Arena	Monroe	Michigan	4,400	3,472	2,400			
438		Washington Avenue Armory	Albany	New York	4,300	3,600			1891	
439		Haynes Pavilion	Bozeman	Montana	4,275	3,555	2,575		1999	
440		East Grand Forks Civic Arena	East Grand Forks	Minnesota	4,200	3,300	3,300		1974	
441		Oshkosh Arena	Oshkosh	Wisconsin	4,200	3,500		Wisconsin Herd (NBA G League)	2017	
442		CareFirst Arena	Washington	District of Columbia	4,200	4,200		Washington Mystics (WNBA); Capital City Go-Go (NBA G League)	2018	Washington–Baltimore metropolitan area
443		St. Joseph Civic Arena	St. Joseph	Missouri	4,200	3,250	2,300		1980	
444		Tech CU Arena	San Jose	California	4,200		4,200	San Jose Barracuda (AHL)	2022	Bay Area
445		Aleppo Shriners Auditorium	Wilmington	Massachusetts	4,150		2,650		1977	Greater Boston
446		Davis Pavilion	Red Bluff	California	4,140	3,465	2,596			
447		Rockin A Arena	Palmyra	Missouri	4,125	3,405	2,425		2010	
448		Topsfield Fair Arena	Topsfield	Massachusetts	4,110	3,390	2,410			Greater Boston
449		Rochester Recreation Center	Rochester	Minnesota	4,108		2,508		1975	
450		Dalton Convention Center	Dalton	Georgia	4,070	4,000	2,400	Dalton State College Roadrunners	1991	
451		Rocky Mount Event Center	Rocky Mount	North Carolina	4,035	3,135	2,415		2018	
452		Watertown Municipal Arena	Watertown	New York	4,035	2,500	2,335	Watertown Wolves (FPHL)	1983	
453		Winston-Salem Fairgrounds Annex	Winston-Salem	North Carolina	4,000	3,500	3,500	Carolina Thunderbirds (FPHL)	1989	
454		Alachua County Agriculture and Equestrian Center	Newberry	Florida	4,000	3,232	2,050			
455		Bradenton Area Convention Center	Bradenton	Florida	4,000	3,040			1985	Tampa Bay
456		Lattimore Arena	Rochester	New York	4,000		3,000		1998	
457		King Coal Beckley Automall Arena	Beckley	West Virginia	4,000	2,856		WVU Tech Golden Bears (NAIA)	1961	
458		The Cube	Findlay	Ohio	4,000	3,240	2,400			
459		DeVos Place Convention Center	Grand Rapids	Michigan	4,000	3,280	2,300		2005	West Michigan
460		Kansas State Fair Expo Center	Hutchinson	Kansas	3,924	3,040	1,846		1964	
461		Midland County Fair Center	Midland	Michigan	3,920	3,200	2,220		2010s	
462		Great Plains Coliseum	Lawton	Oklahoma	3,900	3,000				
463		Iron Trail Motors Event Center	Virginia	Minnesota	3,900	3,050	2,000		2021	
464		Stride Bank Arena	Enid	Oklahoma	3,887	3,200			2013	
465		ImOn Ice Arena	Cedar Rapids	Iowa	3,850		3,850	Cedar Rapids RoughRiders (USHL)	2000	
466		Expo Idaho Building	Garden City	Idaho	3,850		1,698			
467		Rochester Recreation Gymnasium	Rochester	New Hampshire	3,840	2,875				
468		JCFEC Covered Arena	Grants Pass	Oregon	3,840	3,040	1,778			
469		Hopkinsville Sportsplex	Hopkinsville	Kentucky	3,836	2,972	2,000		2021	
470		Legacy Park Indoor Arena	Hurricane	Utah	3,820	3,244	2,460			
471		Terry Haws Center	St. Cloud	Minnesota	3,800	2,640	1,720			
472		Centerline Western Stores Arena	Elma	Washington	3,750	3,075	2,000		1982	
473		Maine Sports Arena	Saco	Maine	3,724	3,244				
474		Pontchartrain Center	Kenner	Louisiana	3,720	2,800			1991	Greater New Orleans
475		Muskogee Civic Center	Muskogee	Oklahoma	3,710	2,750			1967	
476		Fantasy Springs Special Events Center	Indio	California	3,700	3,500	3,000			
477		Visalia Convention Center	Visalia	California	3,700	2,044			1972	
478		Ozark Civic Center	Ozark	Alabama	3,600	3,000				
479		Benton County Indoor Arena	Corvallis	Oregon	3,600	2,880	1,900			
480		Walla Walla Expo Building	Walla Walla	Washington	3,600	2,816	1,660			
481		Pape Machinery Arena	Lynden	Washington	3,600	2,700	1,524			
482		Myrtle Beach Convention Center	Myrtle Beach	South Carolina	3,570	2,500	2,157			
483		Afook-Chinen Civic Auditorium	Hilo	Hawaii	3,568	2,868		Hawaii Hilo Vulcans (NCAA)	1957	
484		Equidome	Burbank	California	3,500				1982	
485		Memphis Sports and Event Center	Memphis	Tennessee	3,500	3,500			2022	
486		Harang Auditorium	Thibodaux	Louisiana	3,500	3,500			1970	
487		Baldwin County Coliseum	Robertsdale	Alabama	3,500					
488		Northwest Arena	Jamestown	New York	3,500		3,000		2003	
489		Mid-Hudson Civic Center	Poughkeepsie	New York	3,500				1970	New York metropolitan area
490		Bonnie Castle Recreation Center	Alexandria Bay	New York	3,500	3,500	3,500		N/A	
491		Menard Sports Center	Wasilla	Alaska	3,500		3,000		2004	
492		Washington County Convention Center	Greenville	Mississippi	3,500	2,492				
493		Cheshire Fairgrounds Arena	Swanzey	New Hampshire	3,500		2,500		Greater Boston	
494		Pendleton Convention Center	Pendleton	Oregon	3,430	1,700				
495		Buccaneer Arena	Urbandale	Iowa	3,408		3,250	Des Moines Buccaneers (USHL)	1961	
496		Riverview Health Arena at Innovation Mile	Noblesville	Indiana	3,400			Noblesville Boom (NBA G League)	2025	Indianapolis metropolitan area
497		World Equestrian Center	Ocala	Florida	3,400				2020	
498		Kissimmee Civic Center	Kissimmee	Florida	3,400	3,100				
499		Northwest Arena	Jamestown	New York	3,400		2,350		2002	
500		Ardell Pavilion	Moses Lake	Washington	3,336	2,661	1,616			
501		BankPlus Arena	Dothan	Alabama	3,317	3,317	2,896		2004	
502		Sanford Pentagon	Sioux Falls	South Dakota	3,250	3,250		Sioux Falls Skyforce (NBA G League)	2013	
503		War Memorial Gymnasium	Wailuku	Hawaii	3,228	2,898			1950s	
504		Alan Jay Arena	Sebring	Florida	3,200	2,800				
505		Washington County Multipurpose Building	Marietta	Ohio	3,200	2,432	1,300			
506		Sumter County Civic Center	Sumter	South Carolina	3,200	2,359			1979	
507		Fenn Center	Fort Pierce	Florida	3,200	1,884			2008	
508		Decatur Civic Center	Decatur	Illinois	3,200					
509		Dothan Civic Center	Dothan	Alabama	3,100				1975	
510		Mystique Ice Center	Dubuque	Iowa	3,079		3,079	Dubuque Fighting Saints (USHL)	2010	
511		Marinette Community Recreation Center	Marinette	Wisconsin	3,024		2,182		2019	
512		McGough Arena	Asheville	North Carolina	3,000		3,000			
513		Danbury Ice Arena	Danbury	Connecticut	3,000	3,000	3,000	Danbury Hat Tricks (FPHL)	1999	New York metropolitan area
514		Edge Ice Arena	Bensenville	Illinois	3,000		3,000	Chicago Steel (USHL)	1997	Chicagoland
515		Brazos County Expo North Arena	Bryan	Texas	3,000		3,000			
516		SentryWorld Fieldhouse	Stevens Point	Wisconsin	3,000	2,367	1,842			
517		McMorran Arena	Port Huron	Michigan	3,000	2,200	2,450	Port Huron Prowlers (FPHL)	1960	
518		Portland Exposition Building	Portland	Maine	3,000			Maine Celtics (NBA G League)	1915	
519		La Porte Civic Auditorium	La Porte	Indiana	3,000	2,040			1930	
520		Lawrence Arena	DeLand	Florida	3,000	1,900				
521		John F. Kennedy Memorial Coliseum	Manchester	New Hampshire	3,000		1,600		1963	
522		Dobson Arena	Vail	Colorado	2,840		1,440	Vail Yeti	1979	
523		Tippecanoe County Fair Event Center	Lafayette	Indiana	2,660	1,700			2022	
524		NWO Show Arena	Findlay	Ohio	2,625	1,725				
525		Legacy20 Arena	Middleton	Wisconsin	2,600		2,600	Madison Capitols (USHL)	1998	
526		Kaiser Permanente Arena	Santa Cruz	California	2,505	2,505		Santa Cruz Warriors (NBA G League)	2012	Bay Area
527		Chase Fieldhouse	Wilmington	Delaware	2,500	2,500		Delaware Blue Coats (NBA G League)	2019	Greater Philadelphia
528		FivePoint Arena	Irvine	California	2,500	2,500			2019	Greater Los Angeles
529		Lucas County Recreation Center	Maumee	Ohio	2,500	2,500			1965	
530		Purpur Arena	Grand Forks	North Dakota	2,500		2,500			
531		Garfield County Events Center	Rifle	Colorado	2,470	1,750	1,368			
532		Hickory Metro Convention Center	Hickory	North Carolina	2,450	1,960	1,284		1997	
533		Alario Center	Westwego	Louisiana	2,400	2,400			1999	Greater New Orleans
534		Lahaina Civic Center	Lahaina	Hawaii	2,400	1,760			1972	
535		Eureka Municipal Auditorium	Eureka	California	2,390	974			1936	
536		Big Dipper Ice Arena	Fairbanks	Alaska	2,252	2,252	1,857		1968	
537		Prairie Knights Pavilion	Mandan	North Dakota	2,190	1,362			1990s	
538		Lewis and Clark Multipurpose Building	Helena	Montana	2,182	2,182				
539		Laramie County Events Center	Cheyenne	Wyoming	2,164	1,164	1,164		2019	
540		Greensboro Coliseum Fieldhouse	Greensboro	North Carolina	2,118	2,118		Greensboro Swarm (NBA G League)	2003	
541		Union Arena Community Center	Woodstock	Vermont	2,100					
542		Dave Torrey Arena	St. Cloud	Minnesota	2,000		2,000		1974	
543		Maysa Arena	Minot	North Dakota	1,991		1,991	Minot Minatauros (NAHL)		
544		Barre Auditorium	Barre	Vermont	1,650				1939	
545		Odde Ice Center	Aberdeen	South Dakota	1,600		1,600	Aberdeen Wings (NAHL)	1980	

=== Future ===
Venue	Location	Professional/college teams	Capacity	Opening year	Notes
Dova Arena	Rancho Cordova, California	MASL Sacramento (MASL)	7,500	2027	
Midway Arena	San Diego, California		16,000	TBD	
New Oklahoma City Arena	Oklahoma City, Oklahoma	Oklahoma City Thunder (NBA)	TBD	2028	
New South Philadelphia Arena	Philadelphia, Pennsylvania	Philadelphia Flyers (NHL) Philadelphia 76ers (NBA) Future WNBA Team (WNBA)	TBD	2030	

=== Historic ===
Note: "Historic" denotes either demolished, not in practical use or unused.

- Amway Arena – Orlando, Florida
- ARCO Arena (1985) – Sacramento, California
- Bayfront Arena – St. Petersburg, Florida
- Boston Garden – Boston
- Bradley Center – Milwaukee (also known as BMO Harris Bradley Center)
- Britt Brown Arena at Kansas Coliseum – Valley Center, Kansas
- Brown County Veterans Memorial Arena – Green Bay, Wisconsin
- Buffalo Memorial Auditorium – Buffalo, New York
- Capital Centre – Landover, Maryland (also known as USAir Arena and US Airways Arena during its existence)
- Charlotte Coliseum – Charlotte, North Carolina
- Chicago Coliseum – Chicago
- Chicago Stadium – Chicago
- Civic Arena – Pittsburgh (also known as Mellon Arena)
- Cleveland Arena – Cleveland, Ohio
- Coconut Grove Convention Center – Miami (formerly known as the Dinner Key Auditorium)
- Coliseum at Richfield – Richfield, Ohio
- Compaq Center – Houston (formerly known as The Summit; now the main worship center for Lakewood Church)
- Curtis Hixon Hall – Tampa, Florida
- Denver Coliseum – Denver
- Duquesne Gardens – Pittsburgh
- Hara Arena – Trotwood, Ohio
- HemisFair Arena – San Antonio, Texas
- Hollywood Sportatorium – Pembroke Pines, Florida
- International Amphitheatre – Chicago
- Island Garden – West Hempstead, New York (original arena demolished in 1973)
- Jacksonville Memorial Coliseum – Jacksonville, Florida
- Joe Louis Arena – Detroit
- Kiel Auditorium – St. Louis, Missouri (Enterprise Center stands on the site)
- Kingdome – Seattle
- Long Island Arena – Commack, New York
- Los Angeles Memorial Sports Arena – Los Angeles (BMO Stadium stands on the site)
- Madison Square Garden (second) – New York (built on the site of the first Madison Square Garden; the New York Life Building now stands on the site)
- Madison Square Garden (third) – New York (demolished in 1968; used as a parking lot until One Worldwide Plaza was built on the site in 1989)
  - Note: The first Madison Square Garden was not an indoor arena. Although used for many sports, it had no roof.
- Market Square Arena – Indianapolis
- McNichols Sports Arena – Denver, Colorado
- Metropolitan Sports Center – Bloomington, Minnesota
- Mid-South Coliseum – Memphis, Tennessee
- Minneapolis Auditorium – Minneapolis
- Motor Square Garden – Pittsburgh
- Municipal Auditorium – New Orleans
- New Haven Veterans Memorial Coliseum – New Haven, Connecticut
- Olympia Stadium – Detroit
- Omni Coliseum – Atlanta (State Farm Arena now stands on the site)
- The Palace of Auburn Hills - Auburn Hills, Michigan
- Philadelphia Arena – Philadelphia
- Philadelphia Civic Center – Philadelphia
- Philadelphia Convention Hall – Philadelphia
- Pyramid Arena – Memphis, Tennessee (now a Bass Pro Shops megastore)
- San Francisco Civic Auditorium – San Francisco
- St. Louis Arena – St. Louis, Missouri (also known as the Checkerdome)
- St. Paul Civic Center – Saint Paul, Minnesota
- Salt Palace – Salt Lake City
- Sam Houston Coliseum – Houston
- Sleep Train Arena – Sacramento, California (also known as the second ARCO Arena, and later as Power Balance Pavilion)
- The Spectrum – Philadelphia (also known as CoreStates Spectrum, First Union Spectrum and Wachovia Spectrum)
- Teaneck Armory – Teaneck, New Jersey
- War Memorial Gymnasium – San Francisco
- Washington Coliseum – Washington, D.C. (formerly Uline Arena)

== University-owned sports arenas by seating capacity ==
This table includes indoor arenas by seating capacity, which are owned and operated by universities and colleges and serve as home to college sports teams. Arenas with a capacity of at least 10,000 are included. Arenas which are shared by both professional and college teams, appear on the table of municipal arenas above. Domed stadiums are excluded from this list, with the exception of those which can be configured to serve as the home of major college basketball programs (i.e. the JMA Wireless Dome).

#	Image	Arena/venue	City	State	Max.	Basket.	Hockey	Major tenant(s)	Open
1		JMA Wireless Dome	Syracuse	New York	49,207	35,642		Syracuse Orange	1980
2		Dean Smith Center	Chapel Hill	North Carolina	21,750	21,750		North Carolina Tar Heels	1986
3		Thompson–Boling Arena	Knoxville	Tennessee	21,678	21,678		Tennessee Volunteers	1987
4		Value City Arena	Columbus	Ohio	20,000	19,700	17,500	Ohio State Buckeyes	1998
5		Thomas & Mack Center	Paradise	Nevada	19,522	18,500	16,606	UNLV Runnin' Rebels	1983
6		Bud Walton Arena	Fayetteville	Arkansas	19,368	19,368		Arkansas Razorbacks	1993
7		Colonial Life Arena	Columbia	South Carolina	19,000	18,000		South Carolina Gamecocks	2002
8		Marriott Center	Provo	Utah	17,978	17,978		BYU Cougars	1971
9		Xfinity Center	College Park	Maryland	17,950	17,950		Maryland Terrapins	2002
10		Kohl Center	Madison	Wisconsin	17,230	17,230	15,359	Wisconsin Badgers	1998
11		Simon Skjodt Assembly Hall	Bloomington	Indiana	17,222	17,222		Indiana Hoosiers	1971
12		Allen Fieldhouse	Lawrence	Kansas	16,300	16,300		Kansas Jayhawks	1955
13		Save Mart Center	Fresno	California	16,182	15,544	14,224	Fresno State Bulldogs	2003
14		State Farm Center	Champaign	Illinois	15,500	15,500		Illinois Fighting Illini	1963
15		The Pit	Albuquerque	New Mexico	15,411	15,411		New Mexico Lobos	1966
16		Carver–Hawkeye Arena	Iowa City	Iowa	15,400	15,500		Iowa Hawkeyes	1983
17		Bryce Jordan Center	University Park	Pennsylvania	15,261	15,261		Penn State Nittany Lions	1996
18		United Supermarkets Arena	Lubbock	Texas	15,098	15,098		Texas Tech Red Raiders	1999
19		Mizzou Arena	Columbia	Missouri	15,061	15,061		Missouri Tigers	2004
20		Arena-Auditorium	Laramie	Wyoming	15,028	15,028		Wyoming Cowboys and Cowgirls	1982
21		Jon M. Huntsman Center	Salt Lake City	Utah	15,000	15,000		Utah Utes	1969
22		Breslin Student Events Center	East Lansing	Michigan	15,000	14,709		Michigan State Spartans	1989
23		Moody Center	Austin	Texas	15,000	10,763		Texas Longhorns	2022
24		Mackey Arena	West Lafayette	Indiana	14,804	14,804		Purdue Boilermakers	1967
25		Lawrence Joel Veterans Memorial Coliseum	Winston-Salem	North Carolina	14,665	14,665	14,571	Wake Forest Demon Deacons	1989
26		McKale Center	Tucson	Arizona	14,644	14,644		Arizona Wildcats	1973
27		Williams Arena	Minneapolis	Minnesota	14,625	14,625		Minnesota Golden Gophers	1928
28		John Paul Jones Arena	Charlottesville	Virginia	14,593	14,593		Virginia Cavaliers	2006
29		Coleman Coliseum	Tuscaloosa	Alabama	14,474	13,474		Alabama Crimson Tide	1968
30		Hilton Coliseum	Ames	Iowa	14,384	14,384		Iowa State Cyclones	1971
31		Memorial Gymnasium	Nashville	Tennessee	14,316	14,316		Vanderbilt Commodores	1952
32		Crisler Center	Ann Arbor	Michigan	14,107	12,707		Michigan Wolverines	1967
33		Hope Coliseum	Morgantown	West Virginia	14,000	14,000		West Virginia Mountaineers	1970
34		Pauley Pavilion	Los Angeles	California	13,800	13,800		UCLA Bruins	1965
35		Gallagher-Iba Arena	Stillwater	Oklahoma	13,611	13,611		Oklahoma State Cowboys and Cowgirls	1938
36		Hearnes Center	Columbia	Missouri	13,611	13,611		Missouri Tigers	1972
37		Wolstein Center	Cleveland	Ohio	13,610	13,610		Cleveland State Vikings	1991
38		Cajundome	Lafayette	Louisiana	13,500	12,800	10,340	Louisiana Ragin' Cajuns	1985
39		University of Dayton Arena	Dayton	Ohio	13,435	13,435		Dayton Flyers	1969
40		ExtraMile Arena	Boise	Idaho	13,390	12,380		Boise State Broncos	1982
41		Pete Maravich Assembly Center	Baton Rouge	Louisiana	13,215	13,215		LSU Tigers	1972
42		Convocation Center	Athens	Ohio	13,080	13,080		Ohio Bobcats	1968
43		Reed Arena	College Station	Texas	12,989	12,989		Texas A&M Aggies	1998
44		Bramlage Coliseum	Manhattan	Kansas	12,528	12,528		Kansas State Wildcats	1988
45		Petersen Events Center	Pittsburgh	Pennsylvania	12,508	12,508		Pittsburgh Panthers	2002
46		Donald L. Tucker Civic Center	Tallahassee	Florida	12,500	12,500	9,450	Florida State Seminoles	1981
47		Pan American Center	Las Cruces	New Mexico	12,482	12,482		New Mexico State Aggies	1968
48		Viejas Arena	San Diego	California	12,414	12,414		San Diego State Aztecs	1997
49		Matthew Knight Arena	Eugene	Oregon	12,364	12,364		Oregon Ducks	2011
50		Don Haskins Center	El Paso	Texas	12,364	12,364		UTEP Miners	1976
51		Fifth Third Arena	Cincinnati	Ohio	12,012	12,012		Cincinnati Bearcats	1989
52		Haas Pavilion	Berkeley	California	11,877	11,877		California Golden Bears	1933
53		Beasley Coliseum	Pullman	Washington	11,671	11,671		Washington State Cougars	1973
54		Ralph Engelstad Arena	Grand Forks	North Dakota	11,640		11,640	North Dakota Fighting Hawks	2001
55		Lawlor Events Center	Reno	Nevada	11,536	11,536		Nevada Wolf Pack	1983
56		Lloyd Noble Center	Norman	Oklahoma	11,528	11,528		Oklahoma Sooners	1973
57		Murphy Center	Murfreesboro	Tennessee	11,520	11,520		Middle Tennessee Blue Raiders	1972
58		Dee Events Center	Ogden	Utah	11,500	11,500		Weber State Wildcats	1977
59		Worthen Arena	Muncie	Indiana	11,500	11,500		Ball State Cardinals	1991
60		Kaplan Arena	Williamsburg	Virginia	11,300	11,300		William & Mary Tribe	1971
61		Walkup Skydome	Flagstaff	Arizona	11,230	11,230		Northern Arizona Lumberjacks	1977
62		Nutter Center	Fairborn	Ohio	11,200	9,500		Wright State Raiders	1990
63		CU Events Center	Boulder	Colorado	11,064	11,064		Colorado Buffaloes	1979
64		Great Southern Bank Arena	Springfield	Missouri	11,000	11,000		Missouri State Bears	2008
65		McKenzie Arena	Chattanooga	Tennessee	10,928	10,928		Chattanooga Mocs	1982
66		Montagne Center	Beaumont	Texas	10,746	10,746		Lamar Cardinals	1984
67		Chaifetz Arena	St. Louis	Missouri	10,600	10,600		Saint Louis Billikens	2008
68		Humphrey Coliseum	Starkville	Mississippi	10,575	10,575		Mississippi State Bulldogs	1975
69		First National Bank Arena	Jonesboro	Arkansas	10,563	10,563		Arkansas State Red Wolves	1987
70		Mabee Center	Tulsa	Oklahoma	10,554	10,554		Oral Roberts Golden Eagles	1972
71		Stegeman Coliseum	Athens	Georgia	10,523	10,523		Georgia Bulldogs	1964
72		Charles Koch Arena	Wichita	Kansas	10,506	10,506		Wichita State Shockers	1955
73		Gentry Complex	Nashville	Tennessee	10,500	10,500		Tennessee State Tigers	1980
74		O'Connell Center	Gainesville	Florida	10,500	10,500		Florida Gators	1980
75		Mullins Center	Amherst	Massachusetts	10,500	9,403	8,389	UMass Minutemen	1993
76		Yuengling Center	Tampa	Florida	10,411	10,411		South Florida Bulls	1980
77		Ferrell Center	Waco	Texas	10,347	10,347		Baylor Bears	1988
78		Stan Sheriff Center	Honolulu	Hawaii	10,300	10,300		Hawaii Rainbow Warriors	1994
79		Credit Union 1 Arena	Chicago	Illinois	10,300	8,000		UIC Flames	1982
80		Smith Spectrum	Logan	Utah	10,270	10,270		Utah State Aggies	1968
81		Galen Center	Los Angeles	California	10,258	10,258		USC Trojans	2006
82		Cintas Center	Cincinnati	Ohio	10,250	10,250		Xavier Musketeers	2000
83		CEFCU Arena	Normal	Illinois	10,205	10,200		Illinois State Redbirds	1989
84		Liacouras Center	Philadelphia	Pennsylvania	10,205	10,205		Temple Owls	1997
85		Hulman Center	Terre Haute	Indiana	10,200	10,200		Indiana State Sycamores	1973
86		Harry A. Gampel Pavilion	Storrs	Connecticut	10,167	10,167		UConn Huskies	1990
87		Cassell Coliseum	Blacksburg	Virginia	10,052	10,052		Virginia Tech Hokies	1962
88		Mitchell Center	Mobile	Alabama	10,041	10,041		South Alabama Jaguars	1998
89		Alaska Airlines Arena at Hec Edmundson Pavilion	Seattle	Washington	10,000	10,000		Washington Huskies	1927
90		Strahan Arena	San Marcos	Texas	10,000	10,000		Texas State Bobcats	1982
91		EagleBank Arena	Fairfax	Virginia	10,000	10,000		George Mason Patriots	1985
92		3M Arena at Mariucci	Minneapolis	Minnesota	10,000		10,000	Minnesota Golden Gophers	1993
93		Convocation Center	DeKalb	Illinois	10,000	10,000		Northern Illinois Huskies	2002
94		MSU Dome	Minot	North Dakota	10,000	10,000		Minot State Beavers	1981
95		Addition Financial Arena	Orlando	Florida	10,000	10,000		UCF Knights	2007

== University-owned sports arenas by seating capacity, below 10,000 ==
This table includes indoor arenas by seating capacity, which are owned and operated by universities and colleges and serve as home to college sports teams. Arenas with a capacity of at least 5,000 are included.

Image	Arena	City	State	Team	Conference	Capacity	Opened
	UNT Coliseum	Denton	Texas	North Texas	American	9,797	1973
	Al Lawson Center	Tallahassee	Florida	Florida A&M	SWAC	9,639	2009
	Gill Coliseum	Corvallis	Oregon	Oregon State	Pac-12	9,604	1949
	The Sandy and John Black Pavilion at Ole Miss	Oxford	Mississippi	Ole Miss	SEC	9,500	2016
	Truist Arena	Highland Heights	Kentucky	Northern Kentucky	Horizon	9,400	2008
	Cameron Indoor Stadium	Durham	North Carolina	Duke	ACC	9,314	1940
	Eblen Center	Cookeville	Tennessee	Tennessee Tech	Ohio Valley	9,282	1977
	Edmund P. Joyce Center	Notre Dame	Indiana	Notre Dame	ACC	9,149	1968
	Dale F. Halton Arena	Charlotte	North Carolina	Charlotte	The American	9,105	1996
	Hinkle Fieldhouse	Indianapolis	Indiana	Butler	Big East	9,100	1928
	Cam Henderson Center	Huntington	West Virginia	Marshall	Sun Belt	9,048	1981
	Littlejohn Coliseum	Clemson	South Carolina	Clemson	ACC	9,000	1968
	Lakefront Arena	New Orleans	Louisiana	New Orleans	Southland	8,933	1983
	George Gervin GameAbove Center	Ypsilanti	Michigan	Eastern Michigan	MAC	8,824	1998
	Moby Arena	Fort Collins	Colorado	Colorado State	Mountain West	8,745	1966
	The Palestra	Philadelphia	Pennsylvania	Penn	Ivy	8,722	1927
	Conte Forum	Chestnut Hill	Massachusetts	Boston College	ACC; Hockey East	8,606	1988
	CFSB Center	Murray	Kentucky	Murray State	Missouri Valley	8,602	1998
	Hank McCamish Pavilion	Atlanta	Georgia	Georgia Tech	ACC	8,600	1956
	Bartow Arena	Birmingham	Alabama	UAB	The American	8,508	1988
	Atlantic Union Bank Center	Harrisonburg	Virginia	James Madison	Sun Belt	8,500	2020
	UCCU Center	Orem	Utah	Utah Valley	WAC	8,500	1996
	Schollmaier Arena	Fort Worth	Texas	TCU	Big 12	8,500	1961
	Chartway Arena	Norfolk	Virginia	Old Dominion	Sun Belt	8,472	2002
	Reynolds Center	Tulsa	Oklahoma	Tulsa	The American	8,355	1998
	Banterra Center	Carbondale	Illinois	Southern Illinois	Missouri Valley	8,339	1964
	George M. Holmes Convocation Center	Boone	North Carolina	Appalachian State	Sun Belt	8,325	2000
	Calihan Hall	Detroit	Michigan	Detroit Mercy	Horizon	8,295	1952
	Health and Physical Education Arena	Houston	Texas	Texas Southern	SWAC	8,100	1989
	Thomas Assembly Center	Ruston	Louisiana	Louisiana Tech	C-USA	8,098	1982
	Reed Green Coliseum	Hattiesburg	Mississippi	Southern Miss	Sun Belt	8,095	1965
	Wachs Arena	Aberdeen	South Dakota	Northern State	Northern Sun	8,057	1987
	Carmichael Arena	Chapel Hill	North Carolina	North Carolina women	ACC	8,010	1965
	Williams Arena at Minges Coliseum	Greenville	North Carolina	East Carolina	The American	8,000	1968
	Williams Assembly Center	Jackson	Mississippi	Jackson State	SWAC	8,000	1981
	Holt Arena	Pocatello	Idaho	Idaho State men	Big Sky	8,000	1970
	Jersey Mike's Arena	Piscataway	New Jersey	Rutgers	Big Ten	8,000	1977
	Memorial Coliseum	Lexington	Kentucky	Kentucky women	SEC	8,000	1950
	Watsco Center	Coral Gables	Florida	Miami (FL)	ACC	7,972	2003
	Baxter Arena	Omaha	Nebraska	Omaha	Summit; NCHC	7,898	2015
	Ramsey Center	Cullowhee	North Carolina	Western Carolina	Southern	7,826	1986
	Ryan Center	Kingston	Rhode Island	Rhode Island	Atlantic 10	7,657	2002
	Siegel Center	Richmond	Virginia	Virginia Commonwealth	Atlantic 10	7,617	1999
	The Pavilion at ARC	Davis	California	UC Davis	Big West	7,600	1977
	University Center	Hammond	Louisiana	Southeastern Louisiana	Southland	7,500	1982
	Fredrick C. Hobdy Assembly Center	Grambling	Louisiana	Grambling	SWAC	7,500	2007
	Foster Pavilion	Waco	Texas	Baylor	Big 12	7,500	2024
	FG Clark Center	Baton Rouge	Louisiana	Southern	SWAC	7,500	1975
	Dunn–Oliver Acadome	Montgomery	Alabama	Alabama State	SWAC	7,400	1992
	Maples Pavilion	Stanford	California	Stanford	ACC	7,329	1969
	EA Diddle Arena	Bowling Green	Kentucky	Western Kentucky	C-USA	7,326	1963
	Dahlberg Arena	Missoula	Montana	Montana	Big Sky	7,321	1953
	Georgia State Convocation Center	Atlanta	Georgia	Georgia State	Sun Belt	7,300	2022
	Savage Arena	Toledo	Ohio	Toledo	MAC	7,300	1976
	Brick Breeden Fieldhouse	Bozeman	Montana	Montana State	Big Sky	7,250	1957
	William R. Johnson Coliseum	Nacogdoches	Texas	Stephen F. Austin	WAC	7,203	1974
	Robins Center	Richmond	Virginia	Richmond	Atlantic 10	7,201	1972
	Magness Arena	Denver	Colorado	Denver	Summit	7,200	1999
	Hampton Convocation Center	Hampton	Virginia	Hampton	CAA	7,200	1993
	Show Me Center	Cape Girardeau	Missouri	Southeast Missouri State	Ohio Valley	7,189	1987
	Fertitta Center	Houston	Texas	Houston	Big 12	7,100	1969
	Fant–Ewing Coliseum	Monroe	Louisiana	Louisiana–Monroe	Sun Belt	7,085	1971
	Welsh–Ryan Arena	Evanston	Illinois	Northwestern	Big Ten	7,039	1952
	McLeod Center	Cedar Falls	Iowa	Northern Iowa	Missouri Valley	7,018	2006
	Moody Coliseum	University Park	Texas	SMU	The American	7,000	1956
	College Park Center	Arlington	Texas	UT Arlington	WAC	7,000	2012
	Global Credit Union Arena	Phoenix	Arizona	Grand Canyon	WAC	7,000	2011
	Emil and Patricia Jones Convocation Center	Chicago	Illinois	Chicago State	Northeast	7,000	2007
	Davey Whitney Complex	Lorman	Mississippi	Alcorn State	SWAC	7,000	1975
	Credit Union 1 Arena	Chicago	Illinois	UIC	Missouri Valley	6,958	1982
	Jadwin Gymnasium	Princeton	New Jersey	Princeton	Ivy	6,854	1969
	Gross Memorial Coliseum	Hays	Kansas	Fort Hays State	MIAA	6,814	1973
	Alumni Coliseum	Richmond	Kentucky	Eastern Kentucky	ASUN	6,500	1963
	William J. Nicks Building	Prairie View	Texas	Prairie View A&M	SWAC	6,500	1968
	Jerry M. Hughes Athletics Center	Warrensburg	Missouri	Central Missouri	MIAA	6,500	1976
	Frost Arena	Brookings	South Dakota	South Dakota State	Summit	6,500	1973
	Beeghly Center	Youngstown	Ohio	Youngstown State	Horizon	6,500	1972
	Ellis Johnson Arena	Morehead	Kentucky	Morehead State	Ohio Valley	6,500	1981
	Tsongas Center	Lowell	Massachusetts	UMass Lowell	America East	6,496	1998
	Munn Ice Arena	East Lansing	Michigan	Michigan State	Big Ten	6,470	1974
	The Coliseum	Carrollton	Georgia	West Georgia Wolves	ASUN	6,469	2009
	Knapp Center	Des Moines	Iowa	Drake	Missouri Valley	6,424	1992
	Halenbeck Hall	St. Cloud	Minnesota	St. Cloud State Huskies	Northern Sun	6,400+	1965
	Millett Hall	Oxford	Ohio	Miami (Ohio)	MAC	6,400	1968
	Memorial Athletic and Convocation Center	Kent	Ohio	Kent State	MAC	6,327	1950
	Alex G. Spanos Center	Stockton	California	Pacific	West Coast	6,150	1981
	Agganis Arena	Boston	Massachusetts	Boston University men	Hockey East	6,150	2005
	Freedom Hall Civic Center	Johnson City	Tennessee	East Tennessee State	Southern	6,149	1974
	Winthrop Coliseum	Rock Hill	South Carolina	Winthrop	Big South	6,100	1982
	Alumni Arena	Amherst	New York	Buffalo	MAC	6,100	1982
	Bernard Johnson Coliseum	Huntsville	Texas	Sam Houston	C-USA	6,100	1976
	Pegula Ice Arena	University Park	Pennsylvania	Penn State men & women	Big Ten (men); CHA (women)	6,000	2013
	Stabler Arena	Bethlehem	Pennsylvania	Lehigh	Patriot	6,000	1979
	McCarthey Athletic Center	Spokane	Washington	Gonzaga	West Coast	6,000	2004
	Whittemore Center	Durham	New Hampshire	New Hampshire men & women	Hockey East	6,501	1995
	Alabama A&M Events Center	Normal	Alabama	Alabama A&M	SWAC	6,000	2022
	Sanford Coyote Sports Center	Vermillion	South Dakota	South Dakota	Summit	6,000	2016
	Farris Center	Conway	Arkansas	Central Arkansas	ASUN	6,000	1972
	Forbes Arena	Atlanta	Georgia	Morehouse Maroon Tigers	SIAC	6,000	1996
	Reese Court	Cheney	Washington	Eastern Washington	Big Sky	6,000	1981
	Ed Fry Arena	Indiana	Pennsylvania	IUP	PSAC	6,000	2010
	Cadet Field House	Colorado Springs	Colorado	Air Force	Mountain West	5,858	1968
	Yost Ice Arena	Ann Arbor	Michigan	Michigan	Big Ten	5,800	1923
	Cameron Hall	Lexington	Virginia	VMI	Southern	5,800	1981
	UNF Arena	Jacksonville	Florida	North Florida	ASUN	5,800	1993
	First United Bank Center	Canyon	Texas	West Texas A&M Buffaloes	LSC	5,800	2002
	Brooks Center	St. Cloud	Minnesota	St. Cloud State men & women	NCHC (men); WCHA (women)	5,763	1989
	Tudor Fieldhouse	Houston	Texas	Rice	The American	5,750	1950
	Alumni Hall	Annapolis	Maryland	Navy	Patriot	5,710	1991
	Scheels Center	Fargo	North Dakota	North Dakota State	Summit	5,700	2016
	Corbett Sports Center	Greensboro	North Carolina	North Carolina A&T	Big South	5,700	1978
	Bren Events Center	Irvine	California	UC Irvine	Big West	5,608	1987
	Carnesecca Arena	Queens	New York	St. John's women	Big East	5,602	1961
	UC Santa Barbara Events Center	Santa Barbara	California	UC Santa Barbara	Big West	5,600	1979
	Jack Stephens Center	Little Rock	Arkansas	Little Rock	Ohio Valley	5,600	2005
	Reynolds Coliseum	Raleigh	North Carolina	North Carolina State women	ACC	5,500	1949
	James A. Rhodes Arena	Akron	Ohio	Akron	MAC	5,500	1983
	Hytche Athletic Center	Princess Anne	Maryland	Maryland Eastern Shore	MEAC	5,500	1999
	Rafael A. Mangual Coliseum	Mayagüez	Puerto Rico	Puerto Rico-Mayagüez Tarzans and Janes	NCAA D-II Independent; LAI	5,500	1974
	Jack and Ruth Ann Hill Convocation Center	Statesboro	Georgia	Georgia Southern Eagles	Sun Belt	5,500	2024
	Reilly Center	St. Bonaventure	New York	St. Bonaventure	Atlantic 10	5,480	1966
	University Arena	Kalamazoo	Michigan	Western Michigan	MAC	5,421	1957
	The Complex	Valdosta	Georgia	Valdosta State Blazers	Gulf South	5,350	1982
	McGuirk Arena	Mount Pleasant	Michigan	Central Michigan	MAC	5,300	1973
	America First Event Center	Cedar City	Utah	Southern Utah	WAC	5,300	1985
	Lantz Arena	Charleston	Illinois	Eastern Illinois	Ohio Valley	5,300	1967
	The Sobrato Center	San Francisco	California	San Francisco	West Coast	5,300	1958
	Lee and Penny Anderson Arena	Saint Paul	Minnesota	St. Thomas	Summit	5,300	2025
	John M. Belk Arena	Davidson	North Carolina	Davidson	Atlantic 10	5,223	1989
	TU Arena	Towson	Maryland	Towson	CAA	5,200	2013
	Trojan Arena	Troy	Alabama	Troy	Sun Belt	5,200	2012
	Trask Coliseum	Wilmington	North Carolina	UNC Wilmington	CAA	5,200	1977
	Binghamton University Events Center	Vestal	New York	Binghamton	America East	5,142	2004
	Western Hall	Macomb	Illinois	Western Illinois	Summit	5,139	1964
	Mack Sports Complex	Hempstead	New York	Hofstra	CAA	5,124	2000
	Alfond Arena	Orono	Maine	Maine men & women	Hockey East	5,124	1977
	Jenny Craig Pavilion	San Diego	California	San Diego	West Coast	5,100	2000
	TD Arena	Charleston	South Carolina	Charleston	CAA	5,100	2008
	Schar Center	Elon	North Carolina	Elon	CAA	5,100	2018
	VSU Multi-Purpose Center	Ettrick	Virginia	Virginia State Trojans	CIAA	5,100	2016
	Health and Sports Center	Kearney	Nebraska	Nebraska–Kearney Lopers	MIAA	5,100	1990
	Curb Event Center	Nashville	Tennessee	Belmont	Missouri Valley	5,085	2003
	CBU Events Center	Riverside	California	California Baptist	WAC	5,050	2017
	Christl Arena	West Point	New York	Army	Patriot	5,043	1985
	Allen Arena	Nashville	Tennessee	Lipscomb	ASUN	5,028	2001
	Compton Family Ice Arena	Notre Dame	Indiana	Notre Dame	Big Ten	5,022	2011
	Tex Turner Arena	Harrogate	Tennessee	Lincoln Memorial Railsplitters	South Atlantic	5,009	1991
	Harrison HPER Complex	Itta Bena	Mississippi	Mississippi Valley State	SWAC	5,000	1970
	Charles E. Smith Center	Washington	DC	George Washington	Atlantic 10	5,000	1975
	Edmunds Center	DeLand	Florida	Stetson	ASUN	5,000	1974
	Bob Carpenter Center	Newark	Delaware	Delaware	CAA	5,000	1992
	Ocean Bank Convocation Center	Miami	Florida	FIU	C-USA	5,000	1986
	Slater Family Ice Arena	Bowling Green	Ohio	Bowling Green	CCHA	5,000	1967
	Athletics–Recreation Center	Valparaiso	Indiana	Valparaiso	Missouri Valley	5,000	1984
	Provident Credit Union Event Center	San Jose	California	San Jose State	Mountain West	5,000	1989
	Kathleen and Tom Elam Center	Martin	Tennessee	Tennessee-Martin	Ohio Valley	5,000	1969
	Mullett Arena	Tempe	Arizona	Arizona State	Independent	5,000	2022
	Texas A&M–Commerce Field House	Commerce	Texas	East Texas A&M	Southland	5,000	1950
	Van Noord Arena	Grand Rapids	Michigan	Calvin	Michigan Intercollegiate	5,000	2009
	R.L. Vaughn Center	Elizabeth City	North Carolina	Elizabeth City State Vikings	CIAA	5,000	1976
	Sawyer Center	Bethany	Oklahoma	Southern Nazarene Crimson Storm	Great American	5,000	1999
	Alaska Airlines Center	Anchorage	Alaska	Alaska Anchorage Seawolves	GNAC	5,000	2014
	William L. White Auditorium	Emporia	Kansas	Emporia State Hornets	MIAA	5,000	1941
	HPER Complex	Albany	Georgia	Albany State Golden Rams	SIAC	5,000	1997
	HPE Basketball Arena/Wildcat Arena	Fort Valley	Georgia	Fort Valley State Wildcats	SIAC	5,000	N/A
	Tiger Arena	Savannah	Georgia	Savannah State Tigers and Lady Tigers	SIAC	5,000	2000
	Daniel "Chappie" James Center	Tuskegee	Alabama	Tuskegee Golden Tigers	SIAC	5,000	1987
	Joseph J. Gentile Arena	Chicago	Illinois	Loyola (IL)	Atlantic 10	4,963	1996
	The Legacy Center	Lake Charles	Louisiana	McNeese St.	Southland	4,242	2018
	Walter Pyramid	Long Beach	California	Long Beach State	Big West	4,200	1994
	GVSU Fieldhouse	Allendale	Michigan	GVSU	GLIAC	4,200	1982
	Berry Events Center	Marquette	Michigan	Northern Michigan	CCHA	4,200	1999
	Devlin Fieldhouse	New Orleans	Louisiana	Tulane	The American	4,100	1933
	Titan Gym	Fullerton	California	Cal State Fullerton	Big West	4,000	1984
	Vadalabene Center	Edwardsville	Illinois	SIU Edwardsville	Ohio Valley	4,000	1984
	Gersten Pavilion	Los Angeles	California	Loyola Marymount	West Coast	3,900	1981
	Prather Coliseum	Natchitoches	Louisiana	Northwestern State	Southland	3,900	1964
	Stopher Gymnasium	Thibodaux	Louisiana	Nicholls State	Southland	3,800	1967
	Kimmel Arena	Asheville	North Carolina	UNC Asheville	Big South	3,800	2011
	O'Neill Arena	University Center	Michigan	SVSU	GLIAC	3,500	1985
	Arlin R. Horton Sports Center	Pensacola	Florida	Pensacola Christian Eagles		3,196	1993
	UC Riverside Student Recreation Center	Riverside	California	UC Riverside	Big West	3,168	1994
	Robert A. Mott Athletics Center	San Luis Obispo	California	Cal Poly	Big West	3,032	1960
	O'Reilly Family Event Center	Springfield	Missouri	Drury Panthers	GLVC	2,850	2010
	Swinney Recreation Center	Kansas City	Missouri	Kansas City	Summit	1,500	1941
	Sharp Gym	Houston	Texas	Houston Christian	Southland	1,000	1964

=== Future ===
Arena Name	City	State	Max capacity	Basketball	Hockey	Main Team	Opening Date
Grand Sierra Resort Arena	Reno	Nevada	10,000	10,000		Nevada (men) (NCAA)	2026
New Alabama Arena	Tuscaloosa	Alabama	10,136	10,136		Alabama (NCAA)	TBA
New LSU Arena	Baton Rouge	Louisiana	TBA	TBA		LSU (NCAA)	TBA
New Marshall Arena	Huntington	West Virginia	8,500	8,500		Marshall (NCAA)	TBA

== See also ==
- List of NCAA Division I basketball arenas
- List of NCAA Division I ice hockey arenas
- List of NBA arenas
- List of National Hockey League arenas
- List of U.S. stadiums by capacity
- List of swimming pools in the United States
- List of indoor arenas by capacity
- Lists of stadiums
