= Hulman Center =

Arena at Indiana State University in Terre Haute, Indiana, U.S.

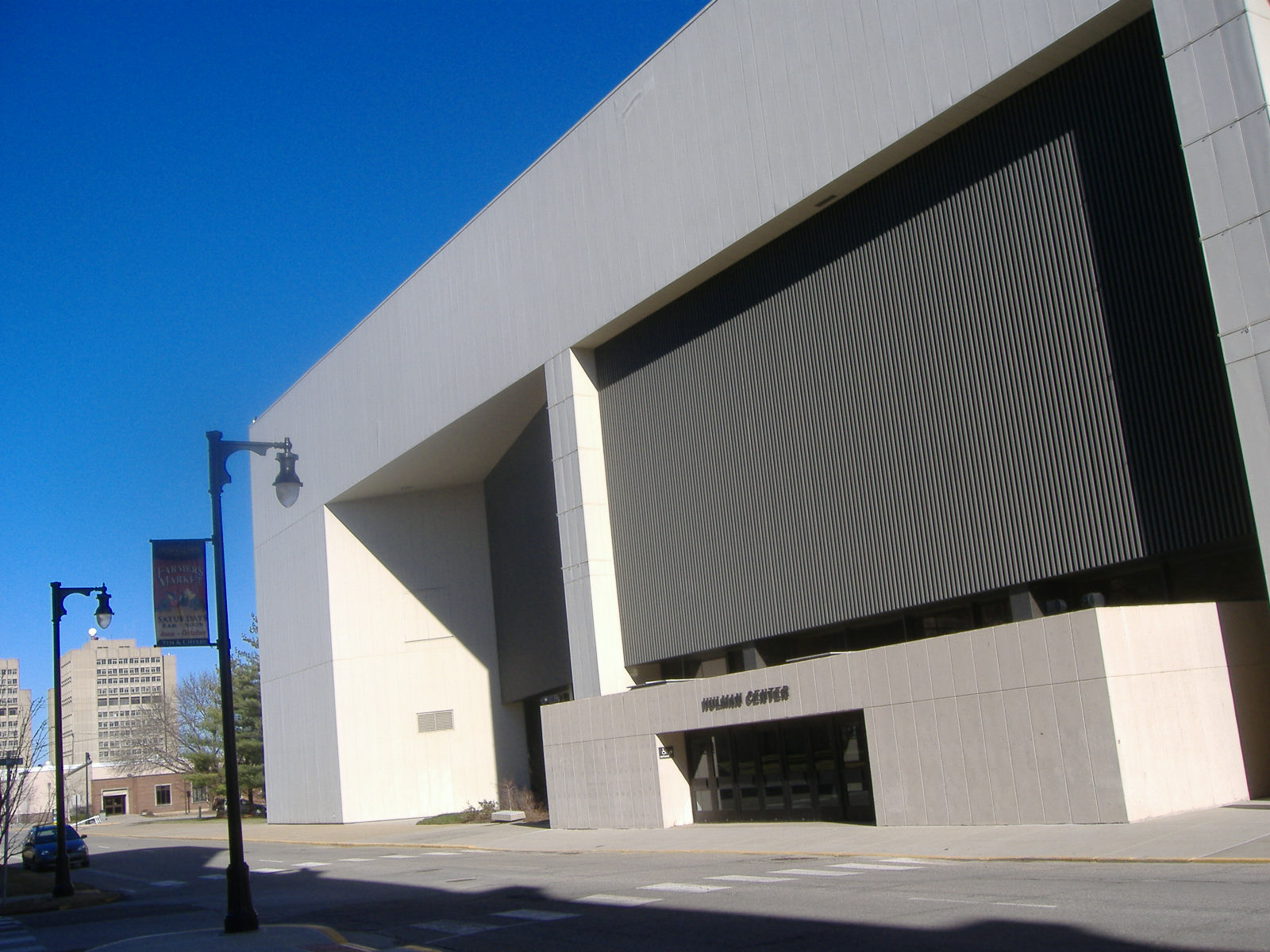
- Hulman Center in 2008
- Interactive map of Hulman Center
- Former names: Hulman Civic University Center
- Location: 200 North 8th Street, Terre Haute, Indiana, U.S. 47809
- Coordinates: 39°28′6″N 87°24′18″W
- Owner: Indiana State University
- Operator: Indiana State University
- Capacity: 9,000
- Surface: Multi-surface

Construction
- Groundbreaking: December 17, 1971
- Opened: December 14, 1973
- Renovated: 2018-2020
- Cost: $10 million ($72.5 million in 2025 dollars) $50 Million (2018-2020 Renovation)
- Architects: Sverdrup & Parcel (Original); Ratio Design (2018-2021 Renovation)

Tenants
- Indiana State Sycamores (Men's Basketball) (Women's Basketball)

The Hulman Center is a 9,000-seat multi-purpose arena on the campus of Indiana State University in Terre Haute, Indiana, United States.

== History ==
Initially named the Hulman Civic University Center, the facility opened on December 14, 1973. Funded by donations and bond issues after an initial $2.5 million challenge gift from philanthropist Tony Hulman, the patriarch of the local Hulman family, it is home to the Indiana State Sycamores men's basketball team.

The Hulman Center has hosted many concerts in its history, including Elvis Presley (1975), Van Halen (1980), Frank Sinatra (1978), Johnny Carson, Kiss, (1977) and John Denver (1978).

It has served as the site of several NCAA championship events including the 1974 Midwest Region of the NCAA men's basketball tournament, the NCAA men's gymnastics finals, and the 1979 Missouri Valley Conference men's basketball tournament title game.

Music acts that have performed at the Hulman Center include: Neil Diamond in 1971, Loretta Lynn in 1975, Lynyrd Skynyrd in 1976, Alice Cooper in 1977, Bob Seger in 1978, REO Speedwagon in 1982, Journey in 1983, John Mellencamp in 1987, Mötley Crüe in 1990, Sponge in 1995, Shania Twain in 1998, Rascal Flatts in 2004, Jason Aldean in 2010, Sheryl Crow in 2013, Cheap Trick in 2015 and Aaron Lewis in 2018.

From 2018 to 2020, Indiana State University undertook a $50M renovation of Hulman Center.

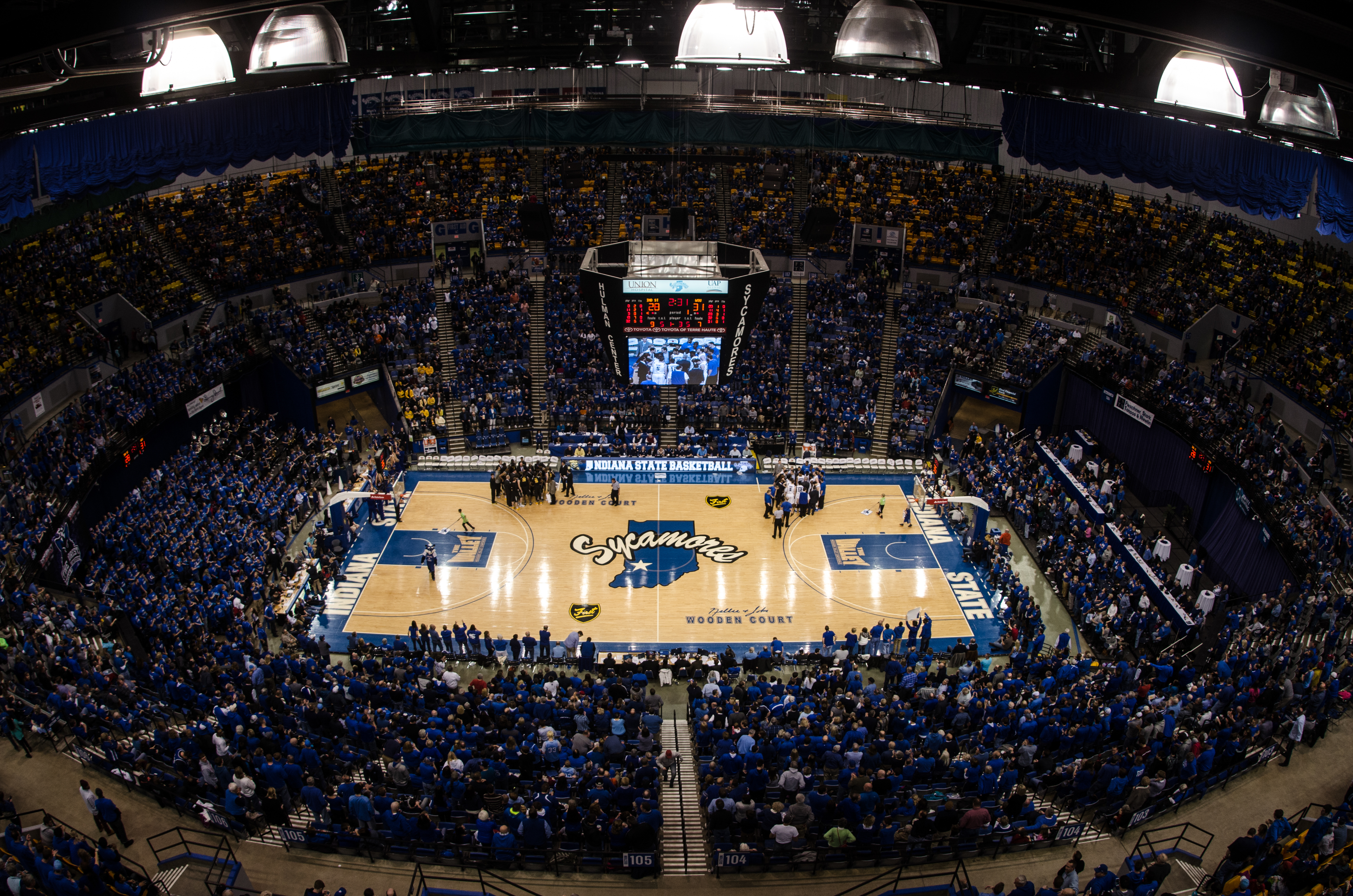
ISU vs. Wichita State at Hulman Center, 2014

== See also ==
- List of NCAA Division I basketball arenas
- List of indoor arenas in the United States
- List of music venues in the United States
