= Maumee Downs =

Former harness racetrack in Ohio, U.S.

- Location: Maumee, Ohio, U.S.
- Date opened: 1902 (Lucas County Fairgrounds); 1946 (Fort Miami Raceway); 1958 (Maumee Downs)
- Date closed: 1961
- Course type: Harness racing

Maumee Downs, formerly known as Fort Miami Raceway, was a harness racing track located in Maumee, Ohio, near the Ohio Turnpike.

== History ==
=== Early years ===
Opened in 1902 as Lucas County Fairgrounds, then later renamed Fort Miami Fairgrounds, the facility gained national notoriety in 1929 when it became the first track in the country to install a lighting system and hold night sessions of harness racing.

=== Fort Miami Raceway ===
The track at the county fairgrounds became known as Fort Miami Raceway. In 1946, the racing facility was fully renovated ahead of its first racing meeting since before World War II. It was one of the state's most modern tracks, featuring an automatic starting gate, photo finish, and the first totalisator betting system in Ohio. Sam Cordovano, former owner of the Buffalo Bills, served as the president and general manager of Toledo-Fort Miami Raceway while his wife was secretary. The grounds included a one-mile oval in addition to a half-mile track.

On March 13, 1948, a 10-year lease agreement for the Northern Ohio track was executed between the Lucas County Agricultural Society and Toledo–Fort Miami Raceways, Inc.

In February 1951, the Fort Miami Raceway in Toledo was awarded spring dates on the Grand Circuit, replacing Roosevelt Raceway for the first three weeks of the Grand Circuit program.

The lease agreement was terminated by the Lucas County Fair Board in September 1953 after the terms were not met by the Raceways corporation. Fort Miami Raceways, Inc. came under the ownership of Illinois State Representative Carl H. Preihs in 1953, during a period when Sam Cordovano was barred from all racetracks in the country.

In 1957, a fire broke out near Key Street and destroyed a barn at the Fort Miami racetrack.

=== Maumee Downs ===
The track was renamed Maumee Downs after a major renovation in 1958. The oval was placed under the management of Toledo–Maumee Raceways, Inc., with construction overseen by Delaware contractor R. K. McNamara. Improvements included resurfacing the track and renovating the grandstand, barns, and associated buildings. A new 154-foot C-5X tote board was installed by the American Totalisator Co. of Baltimore.

== Closure ==
Competition from nearby tracks quickly led to its demise. Maumee Downs held their final race in 1961 after the Ohio Racing Commission awarded their dates to other tracks, effectively prohibiting racing at Maumee.

The former Maumee Downs grandstands became Ned Skeldon Stadium and was the home of the Toledo Mud Hens until 2002.

The site is now the location of the Lucas County Recreation Center.
