= Mojave Crossing =

Indoor arena in Fort Mohave, Arizona

Coordinates: 35.01709°N 114.63480°W

Mojave Crossing Event Center, better known simply as Mojave Crossing, is a 3,000-seat indoor arena located in Fort Mohave, Arizona. It is the largest arena in Mohave County, Arizona and the largest in the Laughlin/Bullhead City area.

The arena is located where California, Nevada and Arizona meet, and in fact, the state of Nevada is across the river from the arena. Mojave Crossing is used for concerts (maximum capacity of 5,000), sporting events, circuses, graduation ceremonies, conventions, trade shows (35,000 square feet of space) and other special events. It features a 300-seat skybox overlooking the arena floor.

The Avi Resort and Casino and Mojave Resort Golf Club are located across the Colorado River from Mojave Crossing.

== See also ==
- List of convention centers in the United States
