= Wells Fargo Arena (Dothan, Alabama) =

Indoor arena in Dothan, Alabama

Coordinates: 31°8′29.45″N 85°24′28.78″W

Wells Fargo Arena (formerly Ameris Arena) was a 3,000-seat indoor arena located in Dothan, Alabama. It is part of the National Peanut Festival complex, and is used for sporting events including rodeos. It is also used for concerts.

Wells Fargo Arena is unique in that its sides have no walls; the arena's stands are built of aluminum. The arena takes up 60,000 square feet (5,600 m^{2}) of space and contains a dirt floor. It is located on Iris Road and be contacted via phone for information regarding pricing, hours, and directions.
