= CCHA =

CCHA may refer to:

- Central Collegiate Hockey Association
- Community College Humanities Association
- City Champions for Heat Action
