= Lucas County Recreation Center =

Sports and entertainment complex in Maumee

Coordinates: 41.58579°N 83.643465°W

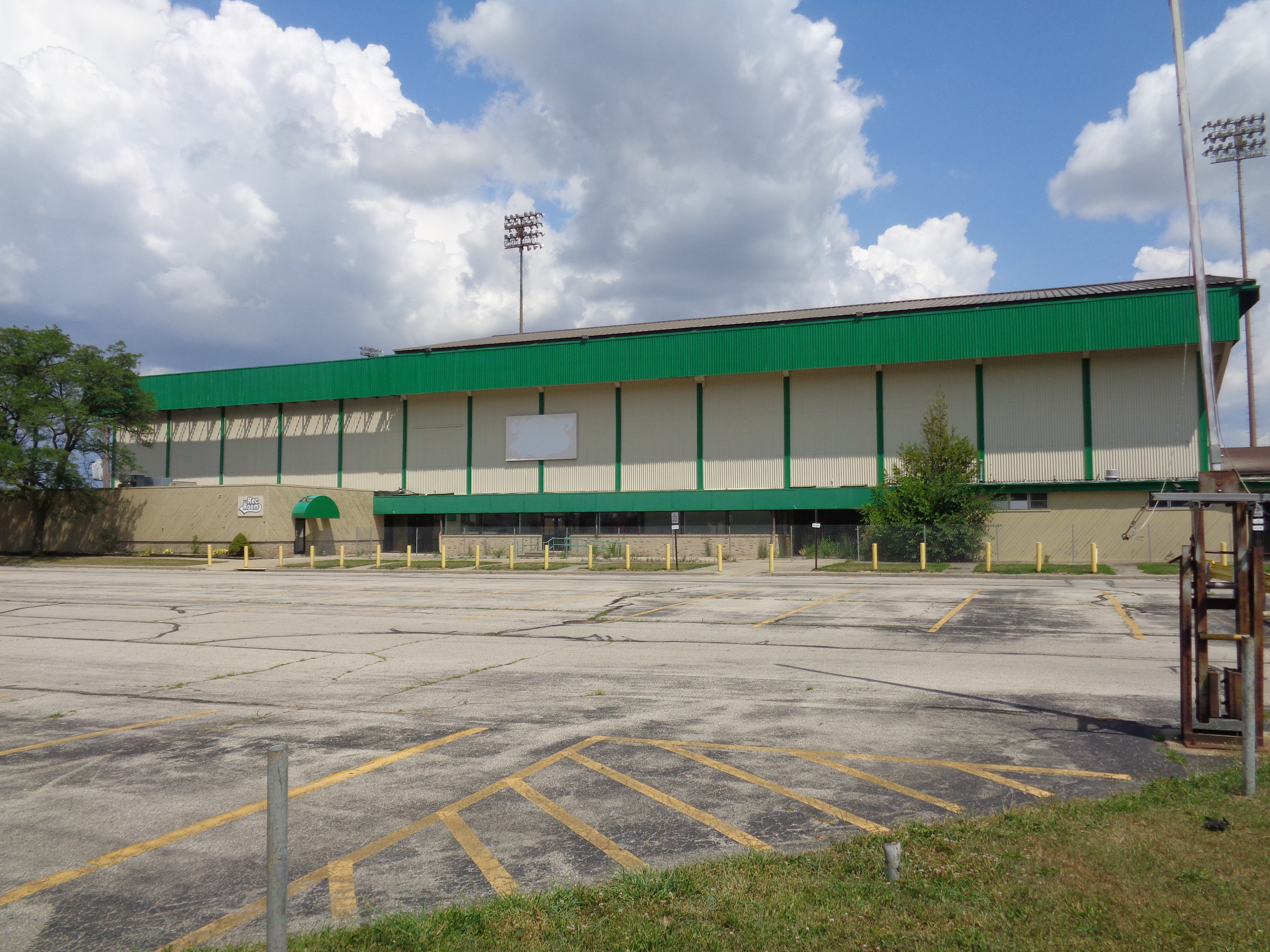
Lucas County Recreation Center in August 2019

The Lucas County Recreation Center is a sports and entertainment complex located in Maumee, Ohio on the site of former horse race track Maumee Downs. LineDrive Sportz & Great Sports leases the property from Lucas County. It is the site of the annual Lucas County fair, and currently consists of the following facilities:

- Two recreation halls with a total of 53,000 square feet (4,900 m^{2}) of exhibit space, used for trade shows, conventions, sporting events, banquets and other events and connected by a 4,000-square-foot (370 m^{2}) clubhouse.
- Ned Skeldon Stadium
- Other athletic facilities including a handball complex, an eight-lane track, two soccer fields, two football fields, six tennis courts, seven baseball diamonds (including one regulation pee wee) with lights and a picnic area.
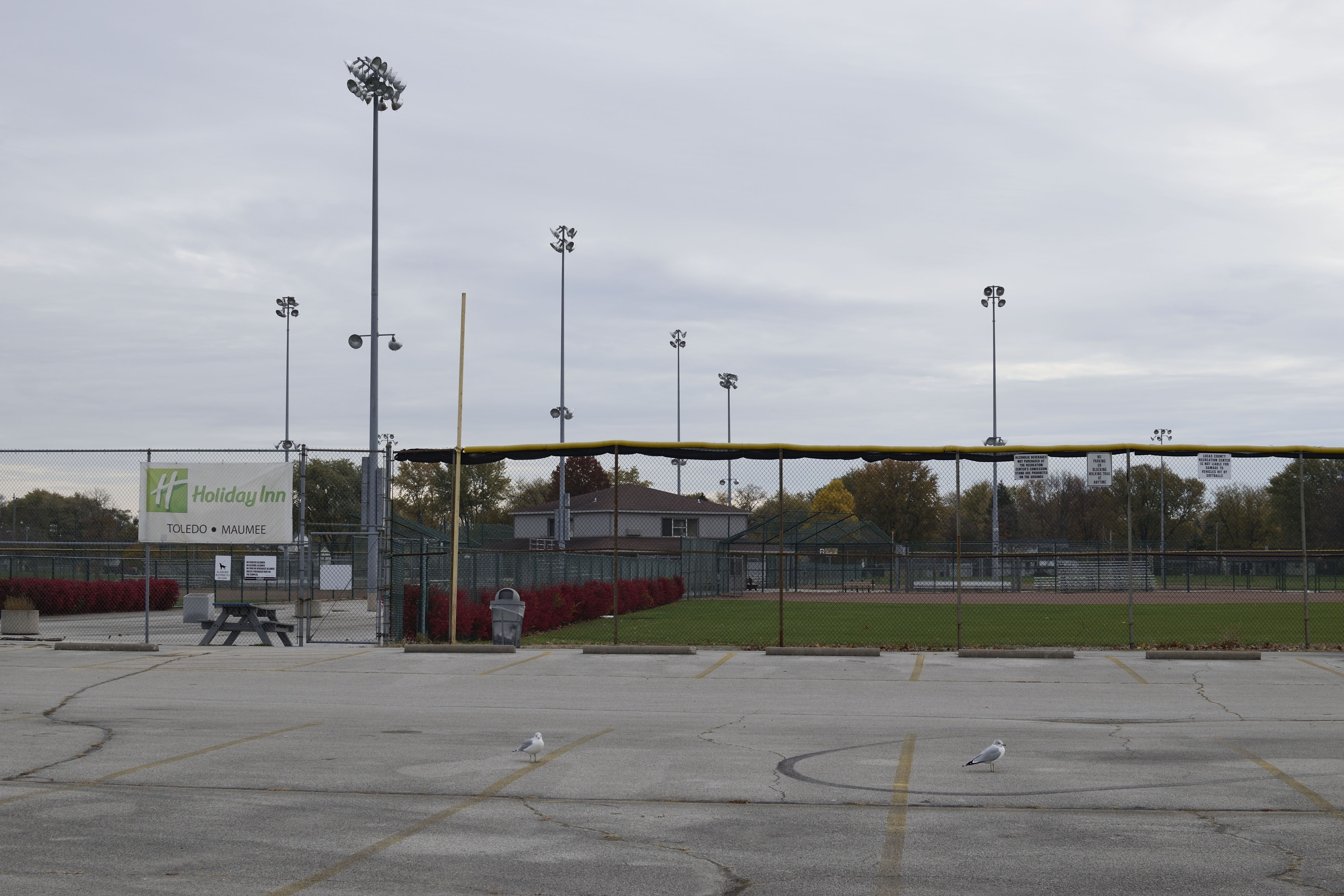
Lucas County Recreation Center in 2019

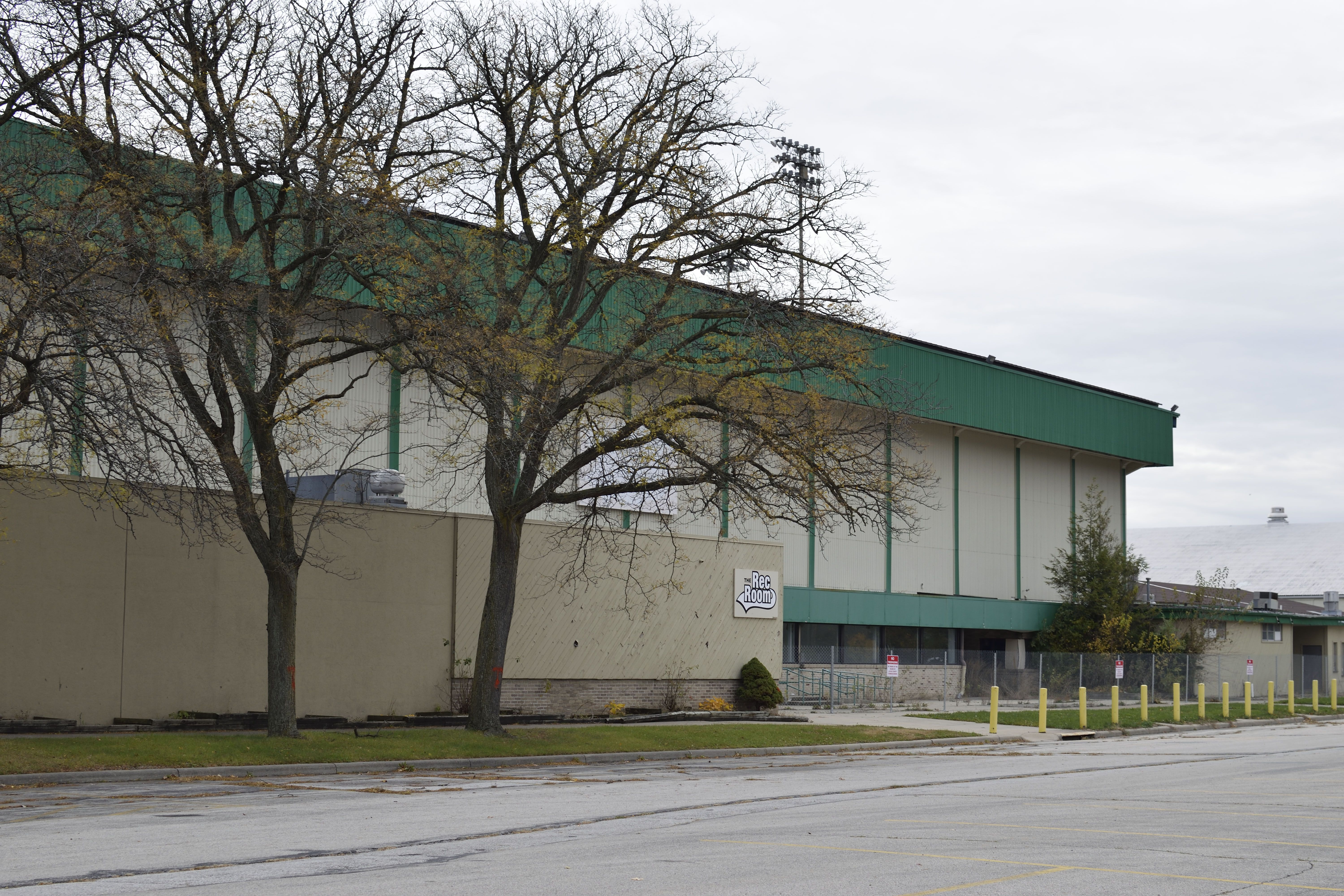
Lucas County Recreation Center in 2019

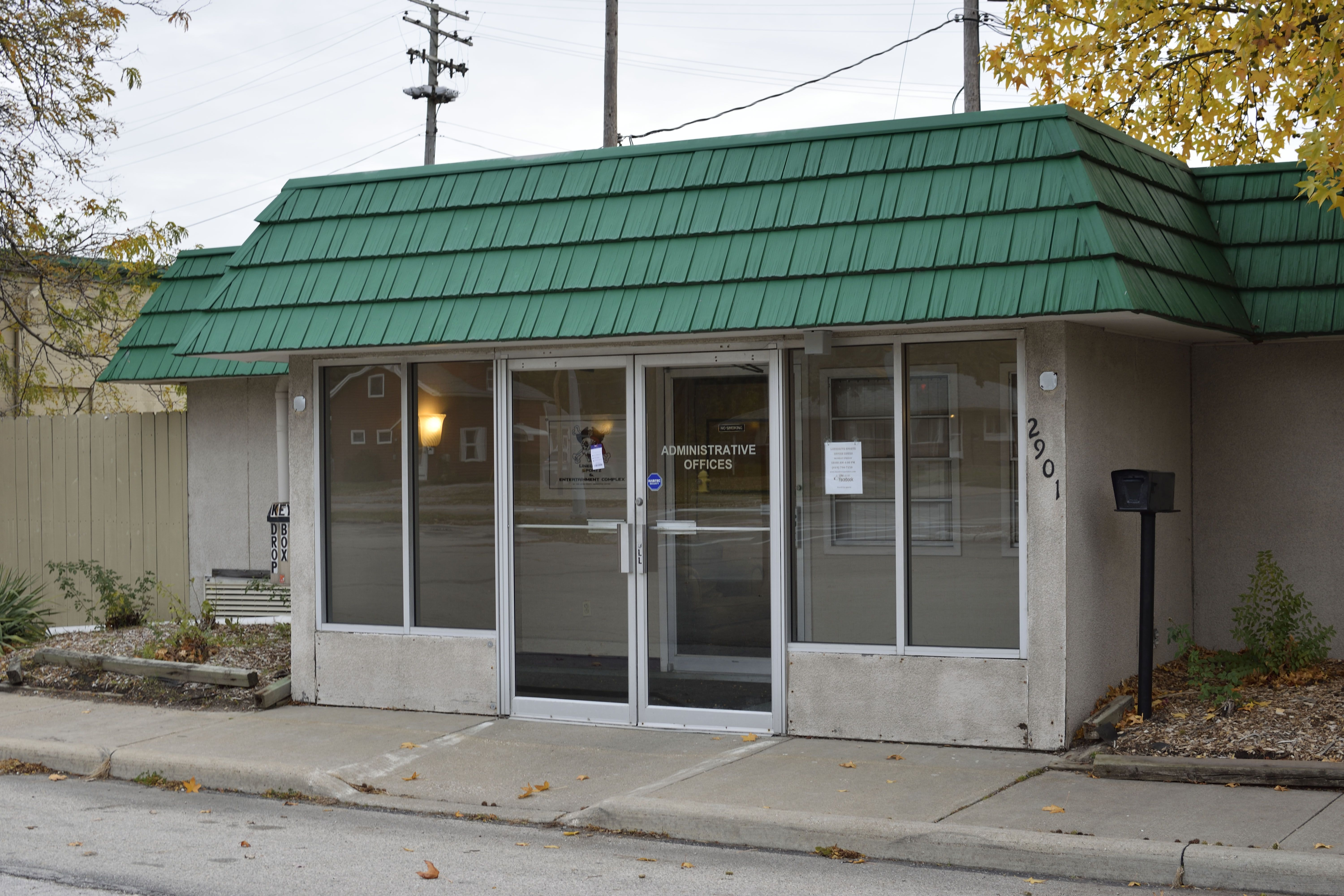
Lucas County Recreation Center in 2019

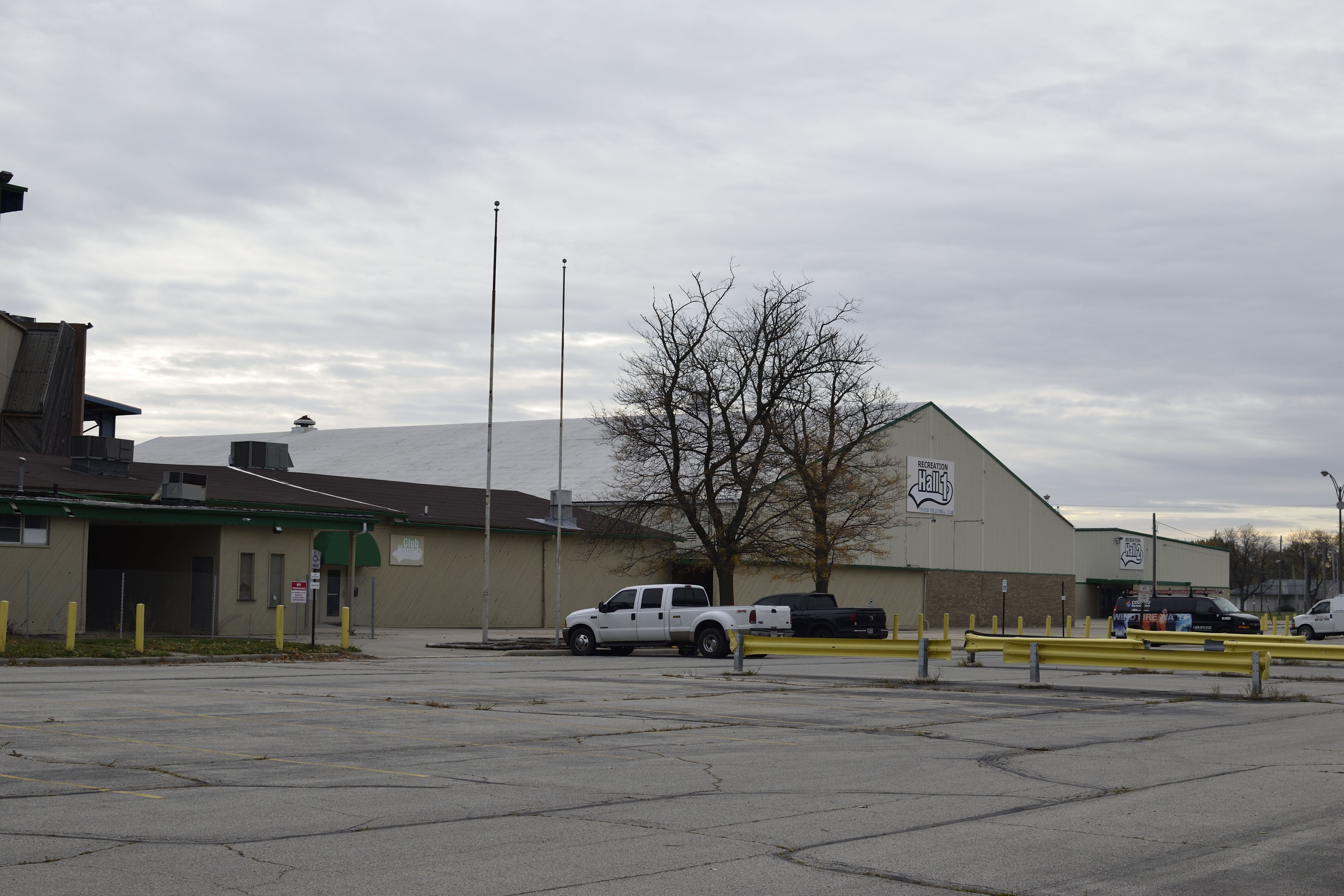
Lucas County Recreation Center in 2019

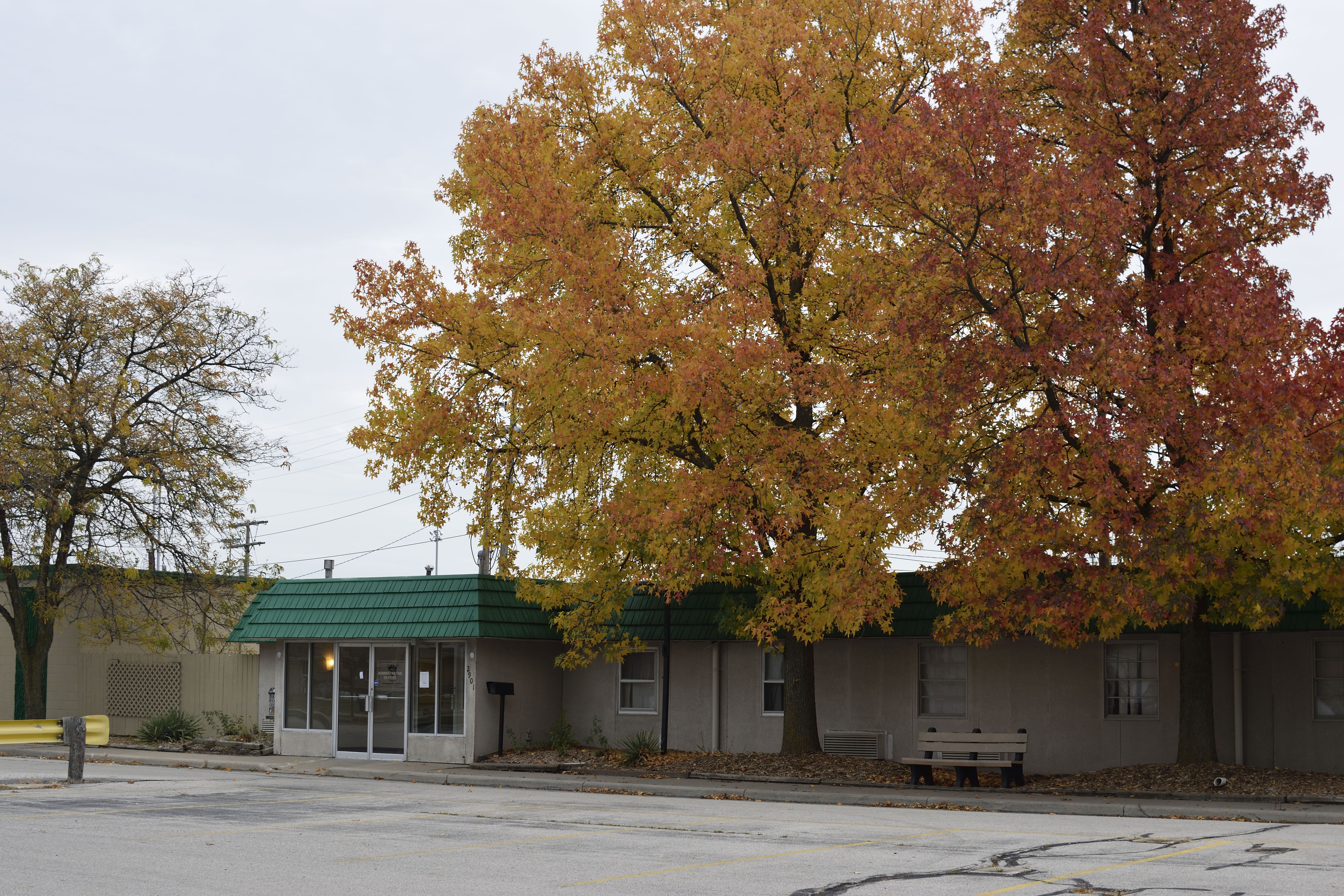
Lucas County Recreation Center in 2019
