= Midway Arena =

Proposed indoor arena in San Diego

- Interactive map of Midway Arena
- Location: San Diego, California
- Coordinates: 32°45′14.7″N 117°12′31.3″W
- Owner: TBD
- Capacity: 16,000 (expandable to 19,000)

Construction
- Cost: TBD
- Architect: Safdie Rabines Architects

Tenant
- TBD

Midway Arena is a planned indoor arena to be constructed in San Diego, California, intended to replace the 1960s-era Pechanga Arena. The development proposal includes the 16,000-seat arena, housing units, a multi-acre urban park, and a mixed-use entertainment, arts, and cultural district.

== History ==
In 2020, the City of San Diego proposed redeveloping the Midway-area sports arena site, a 49-acre (20 ha) parcel. Four developers submitted bids and two were chosen to continue the process, with the winning bid belonging to Brookfield Properties. Plans were halted 10 months later when a state agency claimed the city was not in a position to dispose of the land and had not complied with state regulations.

San Diego restarted the application process in 2021 in accordance with state regulations. Seven applications were received, with five chosen to continue the application process, then further narrowed down to three. In 2022, the city chose the development team Midway Rising to redevelop the site. Midway Rising had a two-year window with San Diego to come to terms with the city; however, the mayor was also able to extend the agreement for two one-year terms. Both parties could also walk away from the deal at any time.

On June 12, 2023, businessman Stan Kroenke, owner of multiple teams of the major professional sports leagues, joined Midway Rising as its majority investor.

In September 2025, the San Diego Planning Commission approved of the project and later in November 2026, the San Diego City Council approved of the project.
