= List of University of North Texas alumni =

The following is a list of notable people who have attended or taught at the University of North Texas.

== Athletics ==
- "Stone Cold" Steve Austin (known as Steve Williams while at UNT), wrestler
- Bill Bishop, NFL defensive tackle
- Bruce Chambers, former Texas Longhorns football assistant coach (1998–2014)
- Patrick Cobbs, NFL running back
- Jaelon Darden, NFL wide receiver
- Lance Dunbar, NFL running back
- Tony Elliott, NFL nose tackle
- Toby Gowin, NFL punter
- "Mean" Joe Greene, NFL defensive tackle and assistant coach, four-time Super Bowl champion, Pro Football Hall of Fame member
- Cedric Hardman, NFL football defensive end; 1970 first round draft pick, San Francisco 49ers
- Abner Haynes, AFL and NFL running back, one-time AFL champion.
- Jim Hess, former college coach and NFL scout
- Don January, PGA Senior Tour golfer
- Chris Jones (born 1993), basketball player for Maccabi Tel Aviv of the Israeli Basketball Premier League
- Brad Kassell, NFL defensive player
- Carl "Spider" Lockhart, NFL defensive back
- Billy Maxwell, PGA Senior Tour golfer
- Tony Mitchell, NBA forward
- Umar Muhammad, football player
- Jamize Olawale, NFL fullback
- Zach Orr, NFL linebacker
- Carlos Ortiz, PGA Tour golfer
- Willie Parker, NFL offensive lineman
- Johnny Quinn, USA Olympic bobsledder
- Ray Renfro, NFL wide receiver, two-time league champion.
- Hurles Scales, NFL defensive back
- Kal Segrist, MLB second baseman and Texas Tech Red Raiders baseball head coach (1968–83)
- Ron Shanklin, NFL receiver and All-Pro player
- Charlie Shepard, all-star CFL running back
- J.T. Smith, NFL wide receiver
- Dennis Swilley, NFL offensive lineman
- Tra Telligman, UFC fighter
- Harry Vines, wheelchair basketball pioneer
- David Von Erich (real name David Adkisson), deceased professional wrestler dubbed the "Yellow Rose of Texas," brother of Kevin Von Erich
- Kevin Von Erich (real name Kevin Adkisson), professional wrestler dubbed "the Golden Warrior", brother of David Von Erich
- Brian Waters, NFL offensive lineman
- Jeff Wilson, NFL running back

== Arts and media ==
- Theodore Albrecht, musicologist
- Larry Austin, composer
- Joe Don Baker, film actor, Charley Varrick, Walking Tall, Cape Fear, three James Bond films
- Dave Barnett, sports announcer
- William Basinski, musician
- Bob Belden, jazz musician, Grammy Award-winning composer
- Brian Biggs, children's book illustrator
- Gregg Bissonette, jazz and rock drummer
- Sally Blakemore, paper engineer and pop-up book creator
- Joan Blondell, Oscar-nominated film and television actress, Desk Set, Nightmare Alley, The Cincinnati Kid, Grease
- Craig Bohmler, composer
- Zach Bolton, voice actor
- Pat Boone, pop and gospel singer, actor and television personality
- Billy Lee Brammer, novelist and journalist
- Justin Briner, voice actor
- Brave Combo, Grammy-winning polka rock band
- Karen Mixon Cook, DJ
- Eden Brent, blues pianist and vocalist
- Rogers Cadenhead, author of computer books; Web publisher; member of RSS Advisory Board
- Matt Chamberlain, session drummer
- Thomas Haden Church, Oscar-nominated and Emmy-winning film and television actor, Sideways, Spider-Man 3, Broken Trail
- Jeff Coffin, jazz saxophonist of Dave Matthews band and Béla Fleck and the Flecktones
- Joseph Patrick Cranshaw, film actor, best known as "Blue" from movie Old School
- Ivan Davis, classical concert pianist
- Charlie Dell, actor
- Aaron Dismuke, voice actor
- Miranda Dodson, Christian folk musician
- Bob Dorough, bebop and jazz pianist/vocalist of Schoolhouse Rock songs
- George Dunham, radio talk-show host and former "voice of the Mean Green Radio Network"
- Matthew Earnest, theatre director
- Greg Edmonson, musician
- Alyssa Edwards, drag performer, choreographer, and businessperson
- Todd and Toby Pipes, members of Deep Blue Something, one-hit wonder from the 1990s
- Rob Erdle, watercolorist, regents' professor
- Charlie Fern, White House speechwriter, journalist
- Kelli Finglass, director of the Dallas Cowboys Cheerleaders, television personality, television producer
- Mark Followill, sports announcer
- O'Neil Ford, architect whose works include San Antonio's Tower of the Americas
- Steven Fromholz, singer-songwriter, 2007 Poet Laureate of Texas
- Bobby Fuller, rock singer/guitarist best known for his band's cover of "I Fought the Law"
- Phyllis George, Miss America 1971; First Lady of Kentucky, 1979–83; TV personality; broadcaster for The NFL Today
- Jimmy Giuffre, jazz musician
- James Hampton, actor and director
- Gerald Harvey Jones, aka G. Harvey, (1933–2017), painter
- Kyle Hebert, voice actor
- Don Henley, Grammy-winning singer-songwriter and drummer, solo and with The Eagles
- Sara Hickman, folk singer/songwriter
- Ray Wylie Hubbard, country music singer
- Madison Humphrey, internet celebrity and broadcast journalist
- Elliott Johnson, artist and designer
- Lawrence B. Jones, journalist, news anchor, news reporter, investigative reporter, and Fox News media personality
- Norah Jones, Grammy-winning pianist and singer-songwriter
- George Keaton, Jr., historian
- Jeffrey L. Kimball, cinematographer of Top Gun
- Scott Kurtz, creator of the webcomic PvP
- Sue Ane Langdon, actress
- Michael Lark, comic book artist
- Michael League, 5-time Grammy-winning founder of the band Snarky Puppy
- Lecrae, Christian hip-hop artist, actor, co-founder of Reach Records
- Tom "Bones" Malone, trombonist; played with Saturday Night Live and Late Show with David Letterman house bands, and The Blues Brothers
- "Blue Lou" Marini, saxophonist; played with Saturday Night Live house band and The Blues Brothers
- Jim Marrs, conspiracy theorist and author of Crossfire: the Plot that Killed Kennedy (the basis for the Oliver Stone film JFK)
- Lyle Mays, composer and keyboardist with Pat Metheny Group
- Dr. Phil McGraw, television personality and psychologist
- Larry McMurtry, novelist, essayist and screenwriter; won Pulitzer Prize for novel Lonesome Dove and Academy Award for screenplay of Brokeback Mountain
- Meat Loaf, rock singer and film actor
- Bill Mercer, sports and professional wrestling announcer
- Takesha Meshé Kizart, operatic soprano
- Jim Metcalf, news reporter and Peabody Award recipient
- R. K. Milholland, creator of webcomics Something Positive, New Gold Dreams and Midnight Macabre
- JD Miller, contemporary artist and founder of Reflectionism
- Lawrence Montaigne, actor, writer, dancer, and stuntman
- Latonia Moore, operatic soprano
- Maren Morris, Grammy Award-winning singer-songwriter
- Bill Moyers, journalist and commentator
- Jack Nance, stage, TV and film actor, notable for his works with director David Lynch including Eraserhead, Twin Peaks
- Trina Nishimura, voice actor
- Warren Carl Norwood, author of science-fiction novels
- Roy Orbison, rock singer-songwriter in Rock and Roll Hall of Fame
- Brina Palencia, voice actor
- Alan Palomo, frontman for Neon Indian
- Jessie Pavelka, television star and model
- Mark Phillips, founding member and face of YouTube group RDCWorld
- Craig Pilo (born 1972), drummer
- Emily Pulley, operatic soprano who has performed in more than 150 operas
- Patricia Racette, operatic soprano
- Leila Rahimi, sports reporter and anchor
- Anne Rice, author, Interview with the Vampire
- Michelle Rojas, voice actor
- Jim Rotondi, jazz trumpeter, educator and conductor
- Melissa Rycroft, dancer and television personality
- Philece Sampler, film, television, and voice actor
- Christopher Sabat, voice actor
- Sonny Strait, voice actor and comic book artist
- Andrew Savage, musician and artist
- Emilia Schatz, video game designer at Naughty Dog
- Christian Shearhod, influencer and educator
- Ann Sheridan, film actress, star of Dodge City, The Man Who Came to Dinner, Nora Prentiss
- Kaela Sinclair, musician, keyboardist and vocalist for M83
- Damin Spritzer, organist and academic
- Clinton Howard Swindle, journalist and author
- Alexis Tipton, voice actor
- Darren Trumeter, member of The Whitest Kids U' Know comedy troupe
- Paul Varghese, stand-up comedian, appeared on NBC's Last Comic Standing
- Jennifer Vasquez, Big Brother season 6 contestant; actor
- Craig Way, sports announcer
- Peter Weller, film actor and star of RoboCop
- Noble Willingham, television and film actor, Walker, Texas Ranger, Good Morning, Vietnam, City Slickers
- Shara Worden, musician, performs under the name My Brightest Diamond
- Xiaoze Xie, artist

== Science and education ==
- Jeff M. Allen, information scientist
- Dee Brock (B.A., M.A., Ph.D.), senior vice president of educational programming at PBS
- Elise F. Harmon (1909–1985; B.S.), physicist, chemist, and major contributor to the miniaturization of computers
- William Stanley Hoole (1903–1990; B.S. 1943), dean emeritus of university libraries, and professor emeritus of library service at the University of Alabama
- Anita Jose, Ph.D, business strategist, essayist, and professor at Hood College
- John E. King, PhD, president of the Kansas State Teachers College (now Emporia State University); president of the University of Wyoming, 1966-1967
- Juan L. Maldonado (B.A. 1972, Master of Education 1975), president of Laredo Community College since 2007
- Gary S. Metcalf (1957), organizational theorist and management consultant
- Charles Mullins, cardiologist and former CEO, Parkland Hospital; administrator, University of Texas System
- Lorene Lane Rogers, Ph.D. (1914–2009), president of The University of Texas, first woman president of a major public university
- Nicola Scafetta, Ph.D, physicist
- Steve Thel, B.A., academic and lawyer

== Government and public service ==
- Adel al-Jubeir, Saudi Minister of Foreign Affairs since 29 April 2015; former ambassador to Washington, former adviser to the Royal Court of Saudi Arabia
- Dick Armey, former majority leader of the United States House of Representatives, Texas District 26, which includes UNT, former economics professor and department chair at UNT
- Michael C. Burgess, current U.S. representative for the 26th Texas district, which includes UNT
- Konni Burton, Texas state senator as of 2015
- Jack Cox, Republican gubernatorial nominee in 1962; Houston oilfield equipment industrialist
- Tony Goolsby (Class of 1961), member of the Texas House of Representatives from Dallas County from 1989 to 2009
- Warren G. Harding, former Texas state treasurer (1977–1983) and Dallas County Treasurer (1950–1977); former president of North Texas State University
- Jim Hightower, populist activist and former Texas Commissioner of Agriculture
- Opal Lee, activist who championed Juneteenth becoming a U.S. federal holiday
- Joseph L. Lengyel, general, U.S. Air Force; chief, National Guard Bureau
- Clint Lorance (born 1984), Army officer convicted of second-degree murder for battlefield deaths; pardoned
- Diane Patrick (Class of 1969 and 1999, M.A. and Ph.D.), member of the Texas House of Representatives from Arlington; former faculty member in education
- Ray Roberts, former congressman from Denton; namesake of nearby Lake Ray Roberts
- Sue Schechter, member of the Texas House of Representatives (1991-1995)
- Corry Schiermeyer, former United States Deputy National Security Advisor for Strategic Communications (acting) (2006–2007), Associate EPA Administrator for Public Affairs (2019-2020)
- Gwyn Shea, former Texas secretary of state (2002–2003); member of the Texas House of Representatives (1983–1993) from Irving; UNT regent since 2007
- Drew Springer, Jr., state representative from District 68 in North Texas and the eastern South Plains
- Barbara Staff, co-chairman of the 1976 Texas Ronald Reagan presidential primary campaign

== Pageantry ==
- R'Bonney Gabriel, first Asian-American Miss Texas USA, winner of Miss USA 2022 and Miss Universe 2022
