= Charles Mullins =

Charles Mullins may refer to:

- Charles Mullins (VC recipient) (1869–1916), South African recipient of the Victoria Cross
- Charles Mullins (physician executive) (1934–2025), American adult cardiologist and physician executive
- Charles Mullins (pediatric cardiologist) (1932–2024), American pediatric cardiologist
- Charles L. Mullins Jr. (1892–1976), United States Army general
- Charles Buddie Mullins, American chemical engineer
- Charlie Mullins (born 1952), British businessman
