= Longview Museum of Fine Arts =

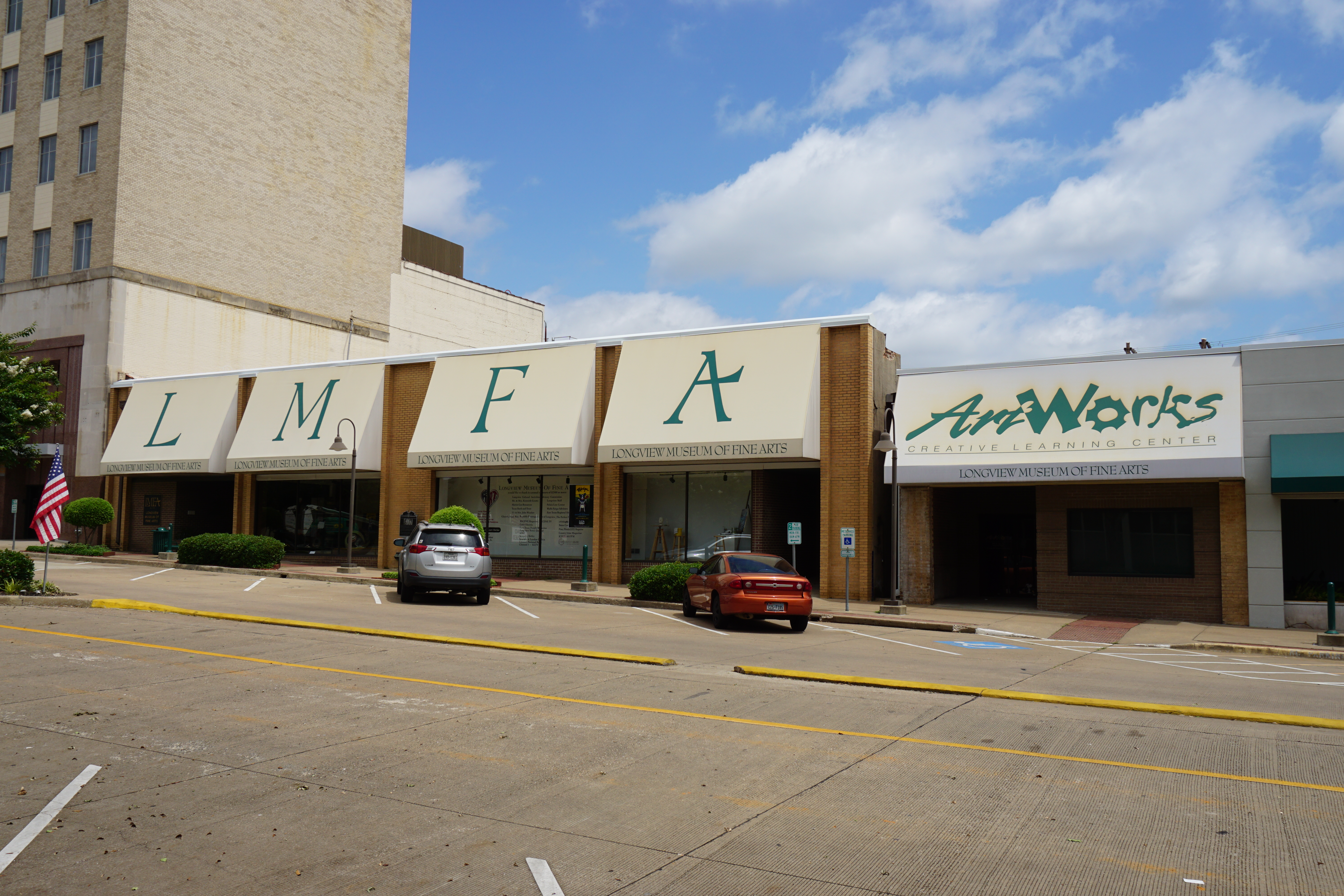
- Exterior of the Longview Museum of Fine Arts

- Location within Texas Location within the United States
- Established: 1958
- Location: Longview, Texas, United States
- Coordinates: 32°29′41″N 94°44′16″W
- Type: Art museum
- Founder: Junior Service League of Longview
- Website: www.lmfa.org

The Longview Museum of Fine Arts (LMFA) is an art museum in downtown Longview, Texas. It was founded in 1958 by the Junior Service League of Longview. Since 1998, it has been on Tyler Street in downtown Longview.

The LMFA's permanent collection consists of over 700 works of art and its primary focus is contemporary art from Texas, Arkansas, Colorado, Louisiana, New Mexico, and Oklahoma. The museum also hosts both traveling and temporary exhibitions while also offering a variety of art education classes.

== History ==
The LMFA was established in 1958 by the Junior Service League of Longview. In 1959, it hosted its first annual Invitational Exhibit, with Dallas Museum of Art director Jerry Bywaters serving as both the consultant and the juror for the exhibit. During its early years, the LMFA was operated by the staff of the Nicholson Memorial Library. In 1970, the Junior Service League's art collection was placed at the LMFA on permanent loan and it was granted a museum charter by the State of Texas.

Since its foundation in 1958, the LMFA has been physically located at five different sites. Jane Akins, one of the women involved with the museum at its inception, noted that the Junior Service League members would transport paintings from site to site themselves in their personal station wagons. On January 17, 1998, the LMFA's current location on Tyler Street in downtown Longview opened with a workshop and lectures by photographers Ruth Bernhard and Michael Kenna, after the building had been renovated the previous year.

In 2005, the LMFA opened its Judge J. T. Smith Sculpture Garden on the corner of Tyler Street and Fredonia Street. In 2012, the museum opened the ArtWorks Creative Learning Center, an educational annex that offers space for classes previously taught in the museum building itself.

== Collections ==
Selections from the LMFA's permanent collection are on display in its main gallery, the Wrather Gallery. The collection, which consists of over 700 etchings, paintings, photographs, woodcuts, and more pieces of art, is too large to display in its entirety and is thus rotated into and out of the gallery. The primary focus of the permanent collection is contemporary art created by Texas artists as well as those from around the region in the states of Arkansas, Colorado, Louisiana, New Mexico, and Oklahoma.

== Exhibitions and events ==
The LMFA hosts both traveling and temporary exhibitions for up to six weeks in its Martin-Stoudt Gallery (Premier I) and Barrow-Cave Gallery (Premier II). The Sculpture Garden hosts rotating exhibits on a yearly basis.

Exhibitions at the LMFA have featured the work of African American artists (including Arthello Beck and Leamon Green), the photography of Rolling Stone, an Andy Warhol exhibition, and the museum's annual Student Invitational, which celebrated its 60th anniversary in 2020.

During the summer, the LMFA also hosts a variety of art education classes, including children's art classes, adult sculpture classes, and photography classes that are open to adults and high school students.

== Gallery ==
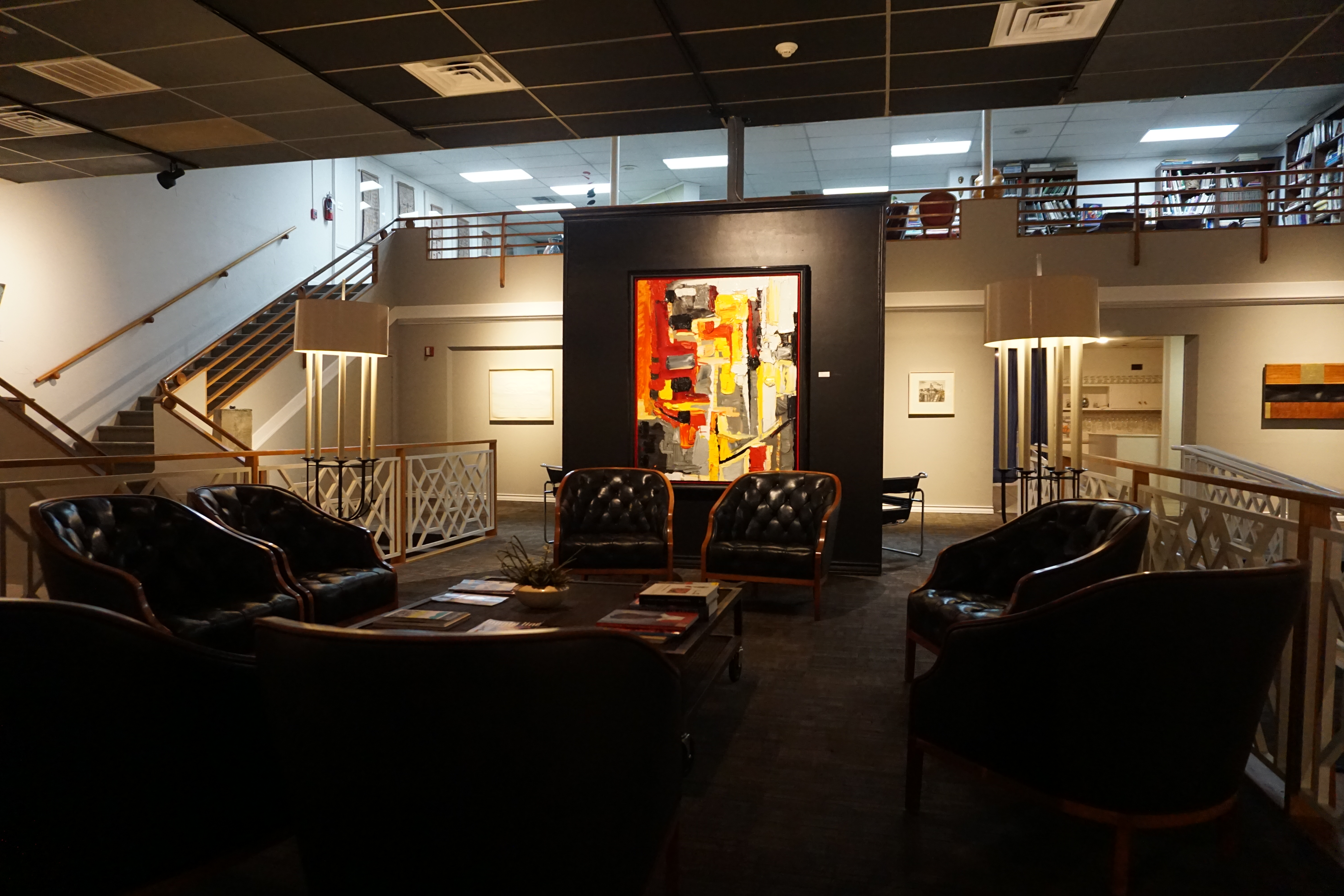
The Garland Proscenium

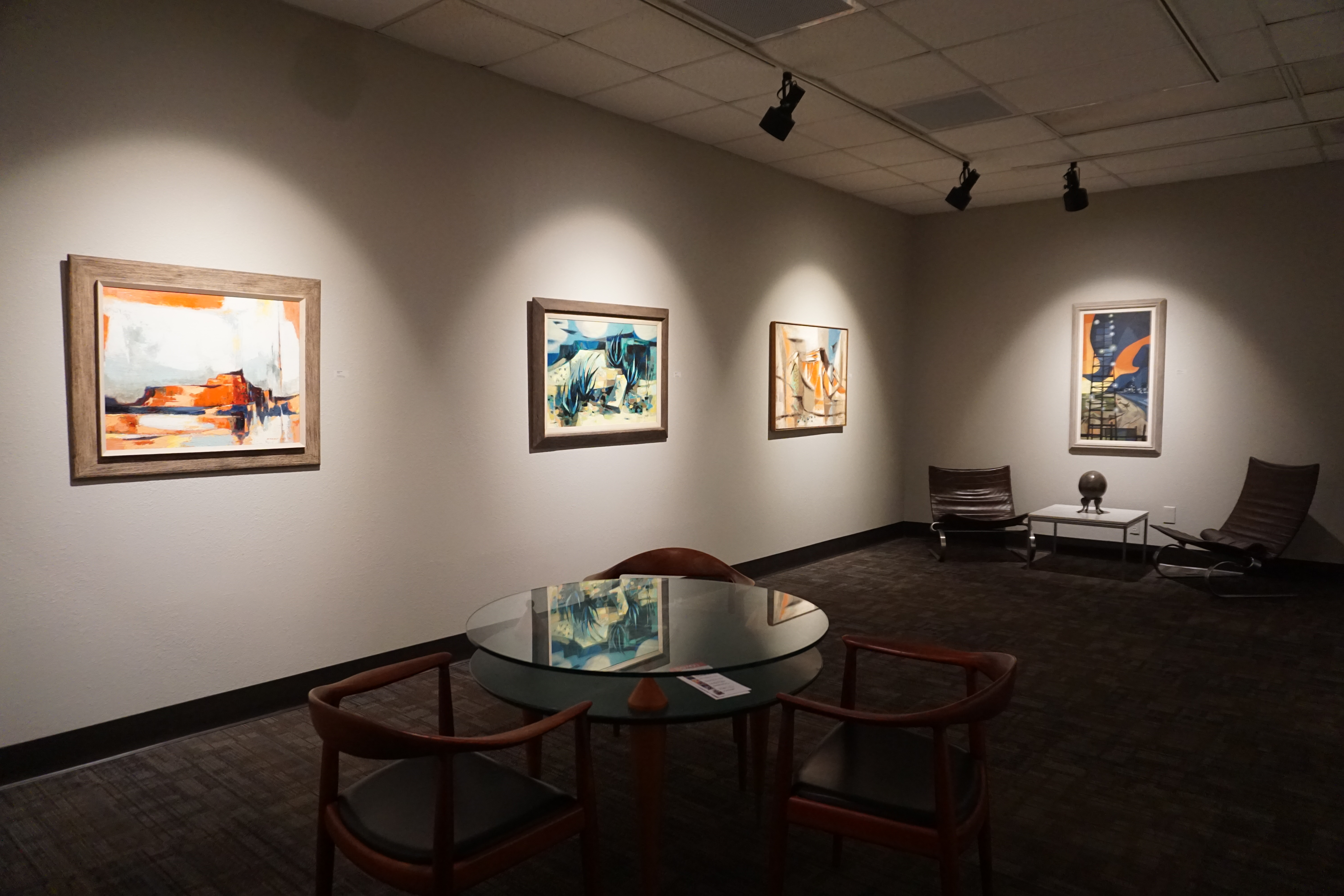
The Dallas Nine gallery

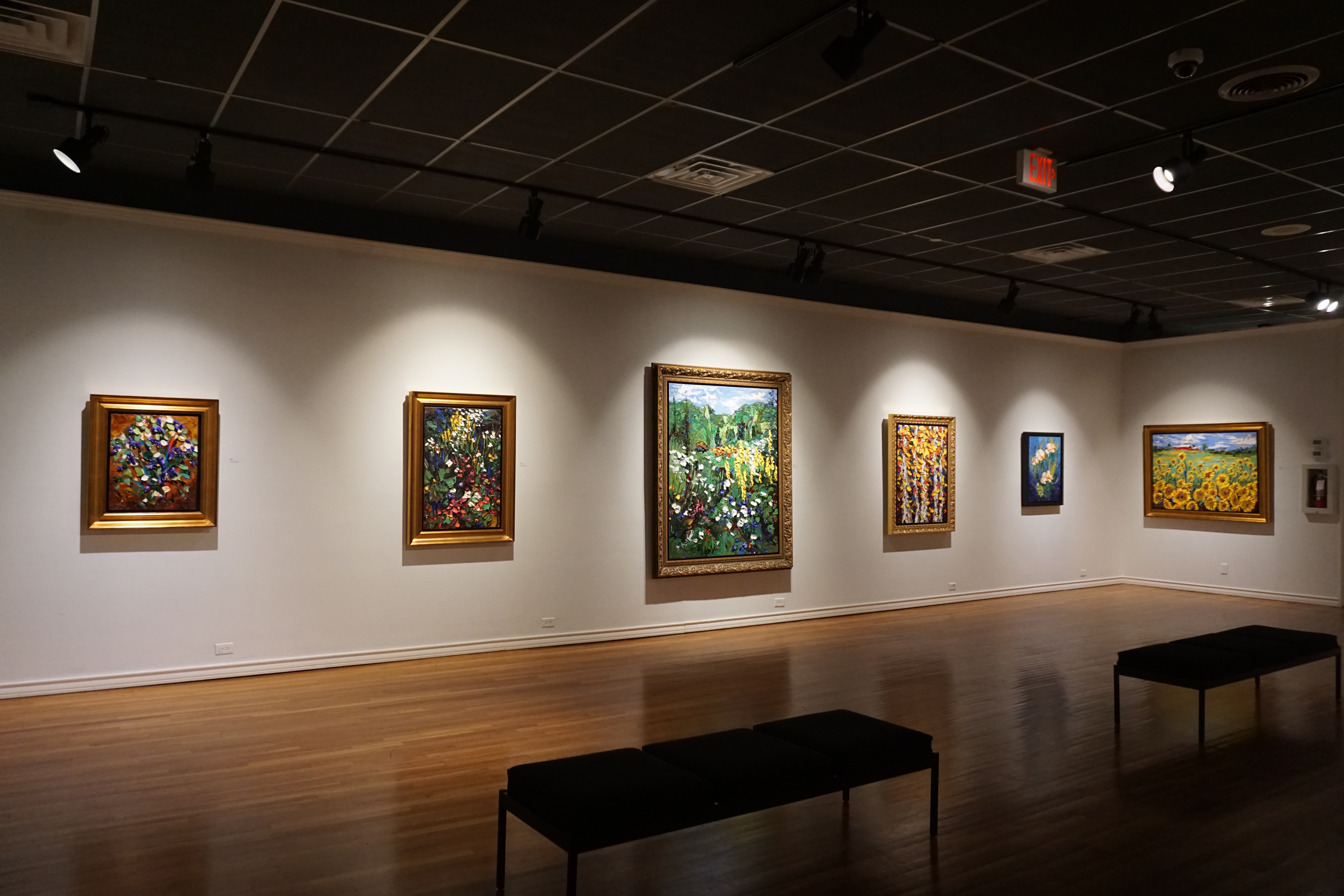
JD Miller: Reflectionist temporary exhibit

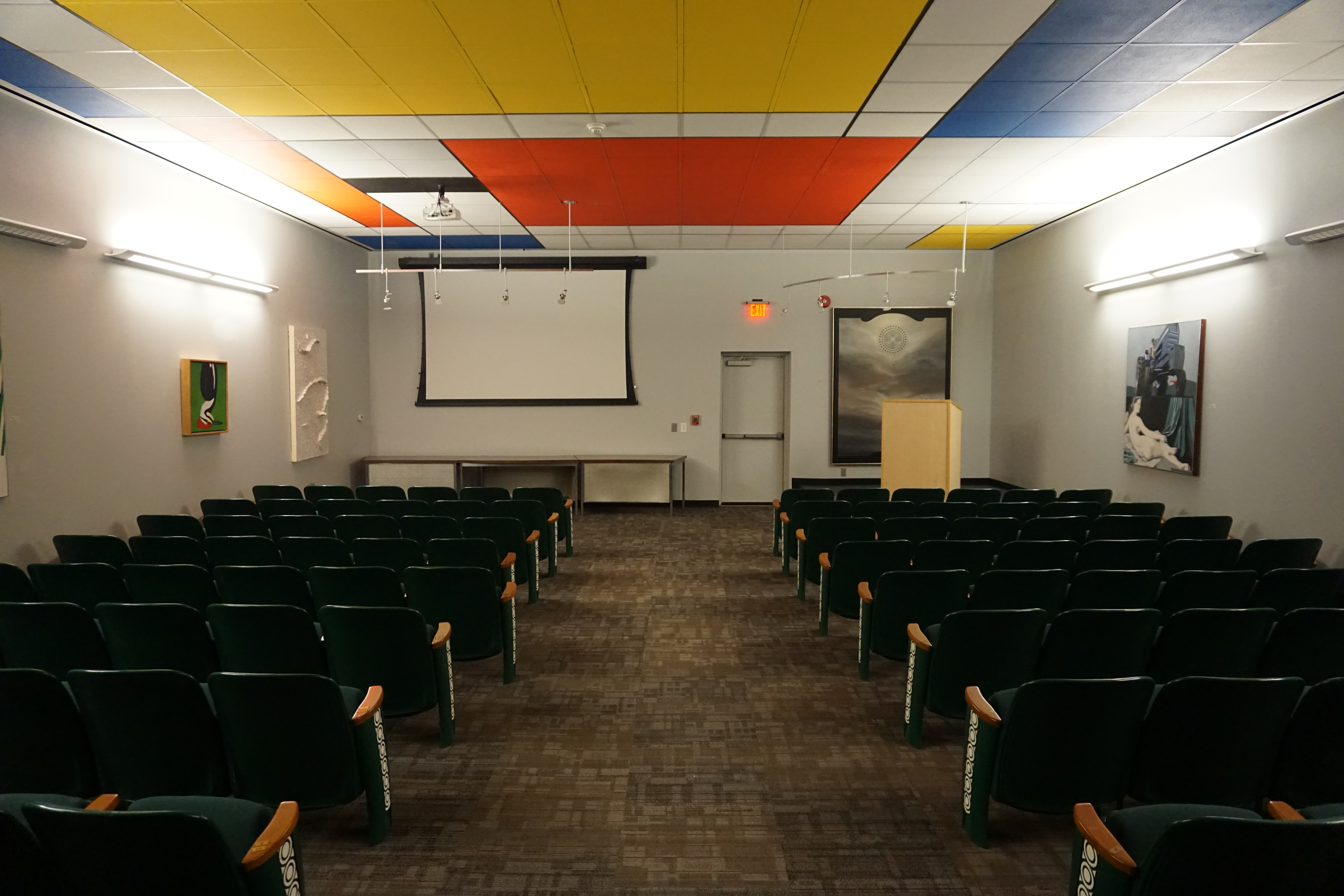
Texas Bank and Trust Lecture Hall
