= David W. Flaherty =

American chemical engineer and professor at Georgia Institute of Technology

- Education: University of California, Berkeley, University of Texas at Austin
- Known for: Catalysis, Surface Science, Materials Synthesis
- Awards: Department of Energy Early Career Award, National Science Foundation CAREER Award, Eastman Foundation Distinguished Lecturer in Catalysis
- Scientific career
- Fields: Chemical Engineering, Catalysis
- Workplaces: Georgia Institute of Technology
- Doctoral advisor: Charles Buddie Mullins

David W. Flaherty is the Thomas C. Loach Jr. Endowed Professor in the School of Chemical and Biomole at Georgia Institute of Technology, joining in June 2023 after previously serving at the University of Illinois, Urbana-Champaign. His research focuses on catalysis, surface science, and materials synthesis aimed at sustainability.

== Education and career ==
- B.S. in Chemical Engineering, University of California, Berkeley
- Ph.D. in Chemical Engineering, University of Texas at Austin (advisor: Charles Buddie Mullins)
- Postdoctoral research with Prof. Enrique Iglesia at the University of California, Berkeley

== Research ==
Flaherty's research focuses on developing the science and application of catalysis for sustainability.

== Awards and honors ==
- Eastman Foundation Distinguished Lecturer in Catalysis, University of California, Berkeley (2021)
- Department of Energy Early Career Award (2019)
- National Science Foundation CAREER Award (2016)
- ACS PRF Doctoral New Investigator Award (2013)
