= Culture of Louisiana =

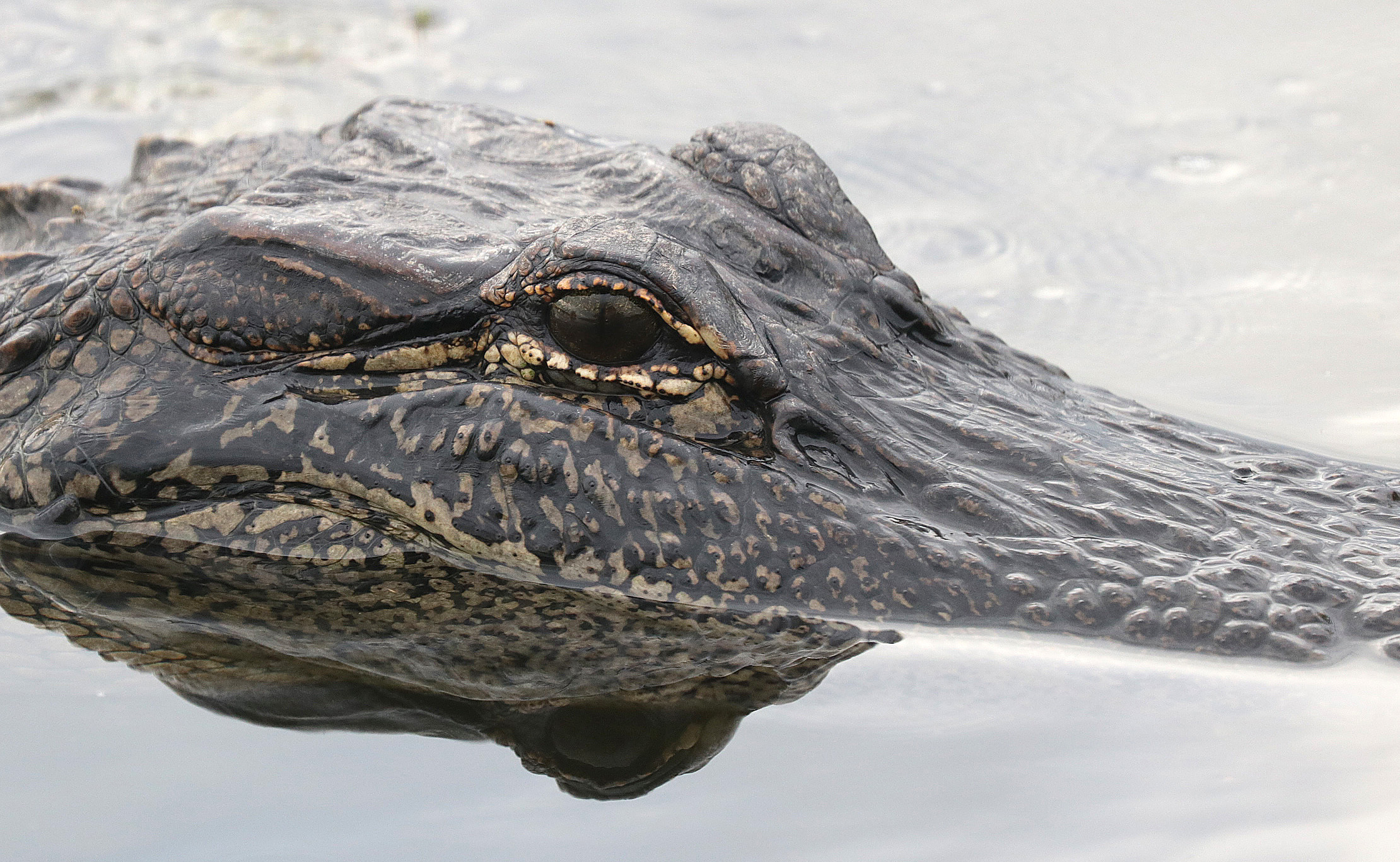
Louisiana Alligator

The culture of Louisiana involves its music, food, religion, clothing, language, architecture, art, literature, games, and sports. Often, these elements are the basis for one of the many festivals in the state. Louisiana, while sharing many similarities to its neighbors along the Gulf Coast, is unique in the influence of Louisiana French culture, due to the historical waves of immigration of French-speaking settlers to Louisiana. Likewise, African-American culture plays a prominent role. While New Orleans, as the largest city, has had an outsize influence on Louisiana throughout its history, other regions both rural and urban have contributed their shared histories and identities to the culture of the state. Louisiana is also influenced by Native American culture.

== Religion ==
The first non-Native American religion in Louisiana was Roman Catholicism, as a result of the predominantly Catholic French and Spanish control of colonial Louisiana. After the Louisiana Purchase in 1803, Protestantism was introduced to the territory. Methodists, Baptists, and Presbyterians were later joined by other Protestant traditions such as Lutherans, who were often German immigrants. Louisiana remains a cultural pot with many different religions. More recent immigrants have brought Buddhism and Islam, etc. into Louisiana. Also, Voodoo is often practiced in south Louisiana, especially in New Orleans.

== Language ==
The state possesses a linguistic heritage shaped by its colonial history. Louisiana French (often referred to as Cajun French) and Louisiana Creole were historically dominant in the southern parishes. Although the use of these languages declined in the 20th century due to English-only educational policies, recent revitalization efforts by the Council for the Development of French in Louisiana (CODOFIL) have promoted French immersion programs in schools. Additionally, Louisiana English has developed distinct vocabulary and grammatical structures, influenced by French and African linguistic patterns.

== Music ==
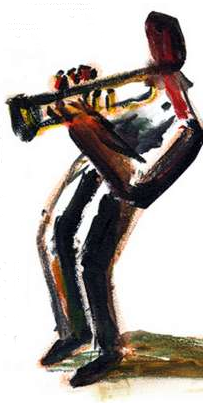

New Orleans is deeply rooted in the tradition of Louisiana jazz music; A unique clash that reached its heart in the dynamic city of New Orleans, where Creole culture had a vital influence, which is how jazz origins are generally described: as a musical gumbo. Business women in New Orleans who held parties helped to foster the early development of jazz music. Additionally, the growth of jazz at the turn of the twentieth century was heavily influenced by the French Creoles of Louisiana.

== Food ==
The state is predominantly known for both its Cajun cuisine, Creole cuisine, and Native American cuisine.

Creole cuisine is influenced by traditional French cooking with Spanish, African, and Indian influences. Cajun cuisine is one of the most popular cuisines in the United States. People in Southern Louisiana say that others eat to live, while they live to eat.

Although the food most identified with the state is the Cajun and Creole food of South Louisiana, North Louisiana also has its own unique cuisine. Traditionally, southern style soul food such as smothered pork chops, chicken and dumplings, candied yams, hot water cornbread, fried chicken, macaroni and cheese, collard greens, and black-eyed peas are commonly eaten in North Louisiana. Natchitoches is famous for its meat pie. For many years, crawfish were not eaten outside of Cajun country. People north of Alexandria were more likely to eat fried chicken or barbecue. Fish fries featuring catfish took the place of crawfish boils. Today, boiled crawfish is served throughout the state.

Other foods popular in Louisiana include gumbo, etouffée, jambalaya, muffuletta, po'boy, and red beans and rice. Seafood is especially popular in Louisiana either as an ingredient or as a main dish such as shrimp, crawfish, crabs, oysters and catfish. Swamp denizens such as gator, frog legs, and turtle soup is popular around the bayous of south Louisiana.

Famous desserts and snacks include king cake, beignets, pralines, sweet potato pie and pecan pie.

== Architecture ==
The architectural landscape of Louisiana reflects diverse cultural influences and adaptations to a humid, subtropical, and flood-prone environment. Distinctive residential styles include the Creole cottage, characterized by its steeply pitched roof and symmetrical facade, and the shotgun house, a narrow rectangular residence historically built on narrow urban lots to minimize property taxes based on street frontage. In rural areas, the raised plantation house became prominent, elevating the main living quarters above ground level to protect against flooding and provide cooling breezes, blending French, Spanish, and Caribbean design elements.

== Festivals and carnivals ==
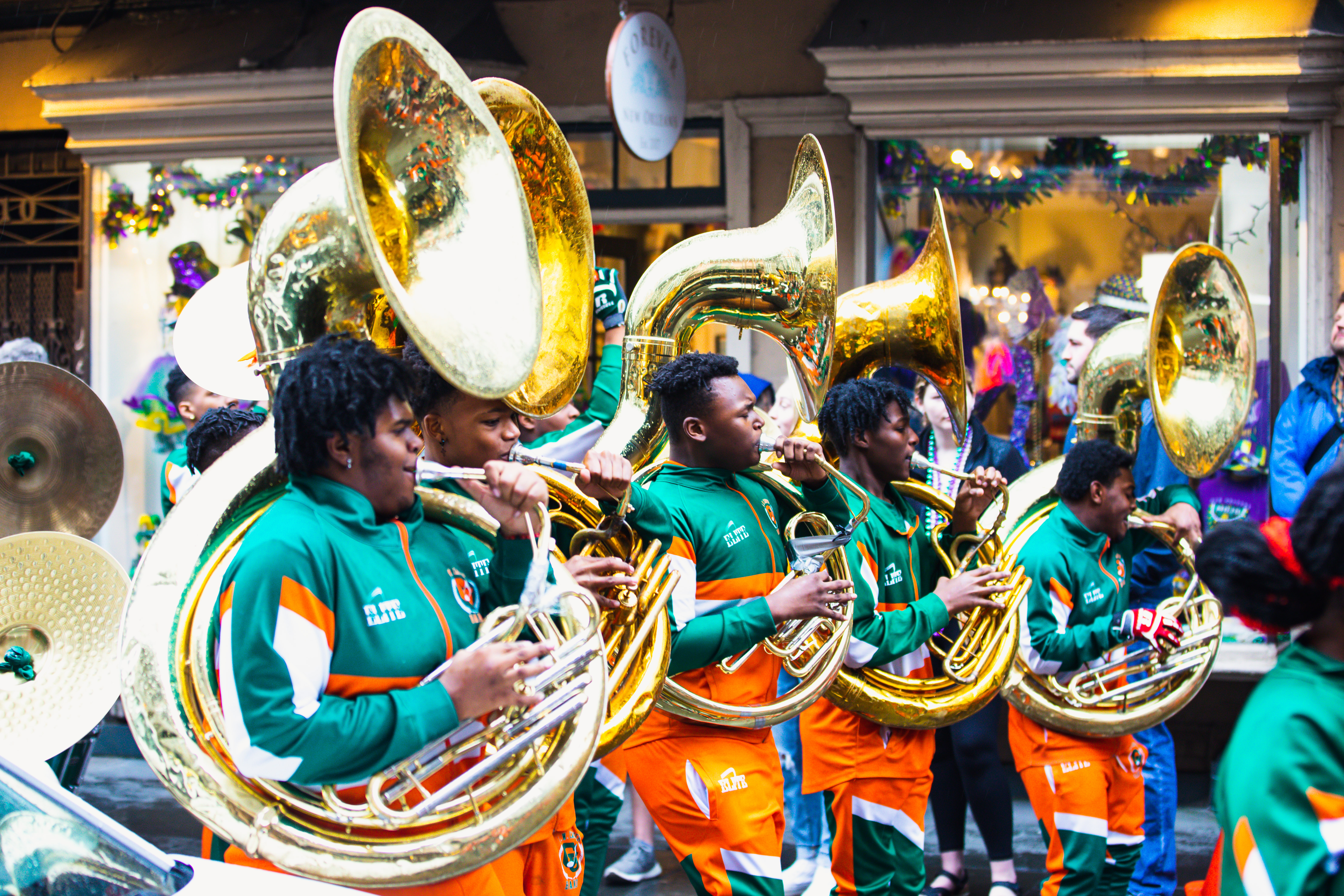

Mardi Gras has its roots in medieval Europe and traveled to the French House of the Bourbons in the 17th and 18th centuries through Rome and Venice. From this point on, France's custom of celebrating "Boeuf Gras," or fattened calf, spread throughout her colonies.

Bienville founded New Orleans in 1718. Mardi Gras was publicly observed in New Orleans by the 1730s, though not with the parades that are familiar to us today. The Marquis de Vaudreuil, the governor of Louisiana, created sophisticated social balls in the early 1740s, which served as the inspiration for modern-day Mardi Gras festivities in New Orleans.

The term "Carnival" associated with Mardi Gras first surfaced in a 1781 report to the Spanish colonial government. That year hundreds of clubs and carnival groups were founded in New Orleans, the first of which was the Perseverance Benevolent & Mutual Aid Association.

In 1971, the Ponchatoula Chamber of Commerce, together with a local nonprofit group, the Jaycees, imagined a festival that would celebrate the town's bountiful harvest and bring the community together. This led to the creation of the inaugural Ponchatoula Strawberry Festival, founded in 1972. Starting with a small 11-booth setup on North 6th Street, it was the start of an annual tradition that would quickly expand. The first festival attracted about 15,000 attendees and set the stage for the state's second-largest free event, which now brings in over 300,000 people annually.

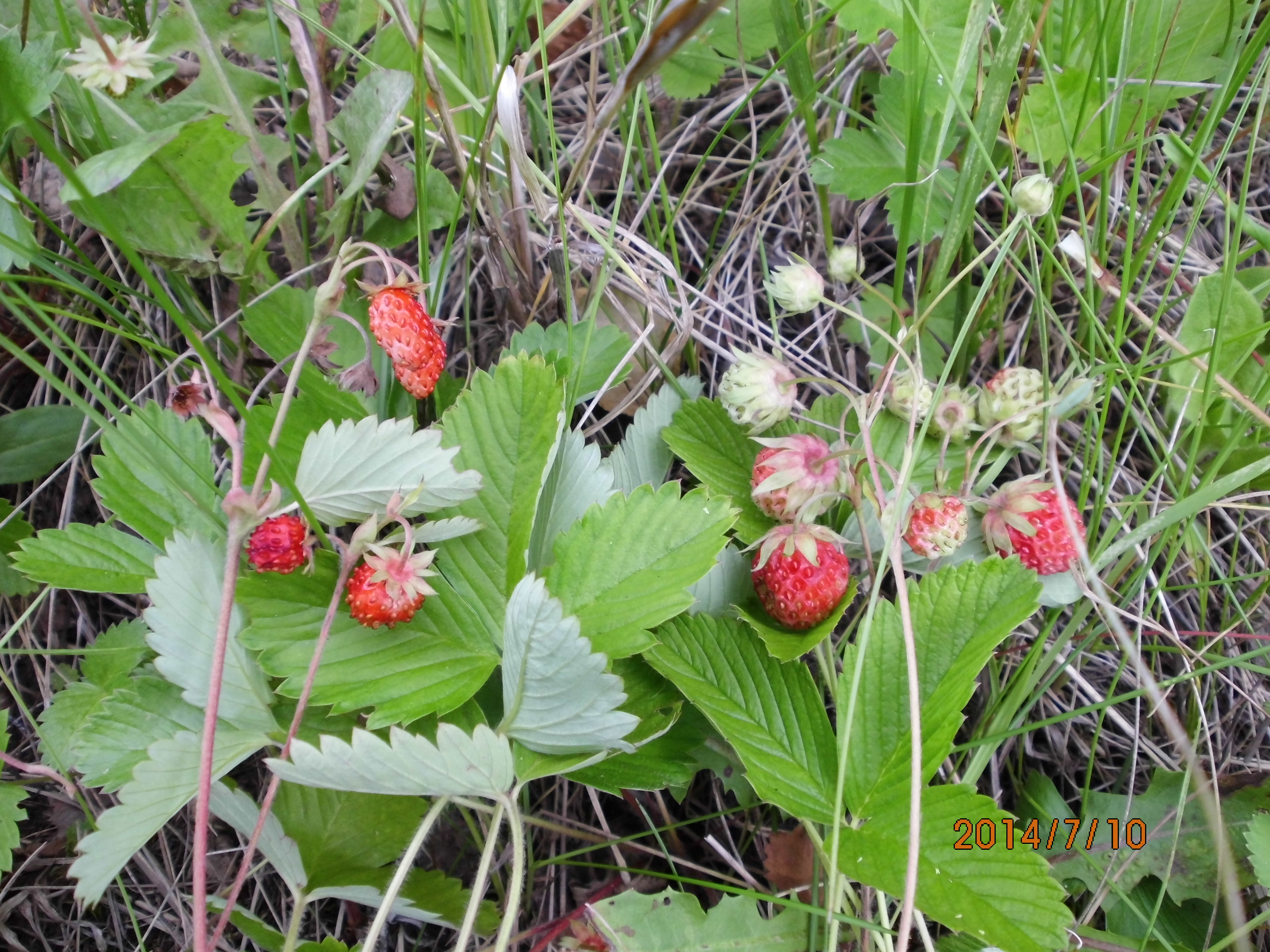

Beyond traditional carnivals, the state hosts major cultural events. The New Orleans Jazz & Heritage Festival, founded in 1970, showcases jazz, blues, R&B, gospel, Cajun, and zydeco music, alongside traditional Louisiana crafts and cuisine. The event regularly reports attendance in the hundreds of thousands. Similarly, the Festival International de Louisiane in Lafayette is a major Francophone music and arts festival in the United States, highlighting the state's cultural ties.

== Sports ==
Sports are very popular in Louisiana, most notably American football. Both athletic sports, such as basketball and baseball, and recreational sports, such as hunting and fishing, are popular. Because of this, the state is often called "Sportsman's Paradise" locally. Since 1958, the Louisiana Sports Hall of Fame has honored the elite figures in state sports history. The state has many sports teams for high school, college and professional athletes.

Like many states, an appreciation for athletics is often instilled from a young age through family lineage and playing of sports growing up. The youth also often participate in high school athletics.

=== Professional ===
- New Orleans Saints (NFL) - New Orleans
- New Orleans Pelicans (NBA) - New Orleans

=== College ===
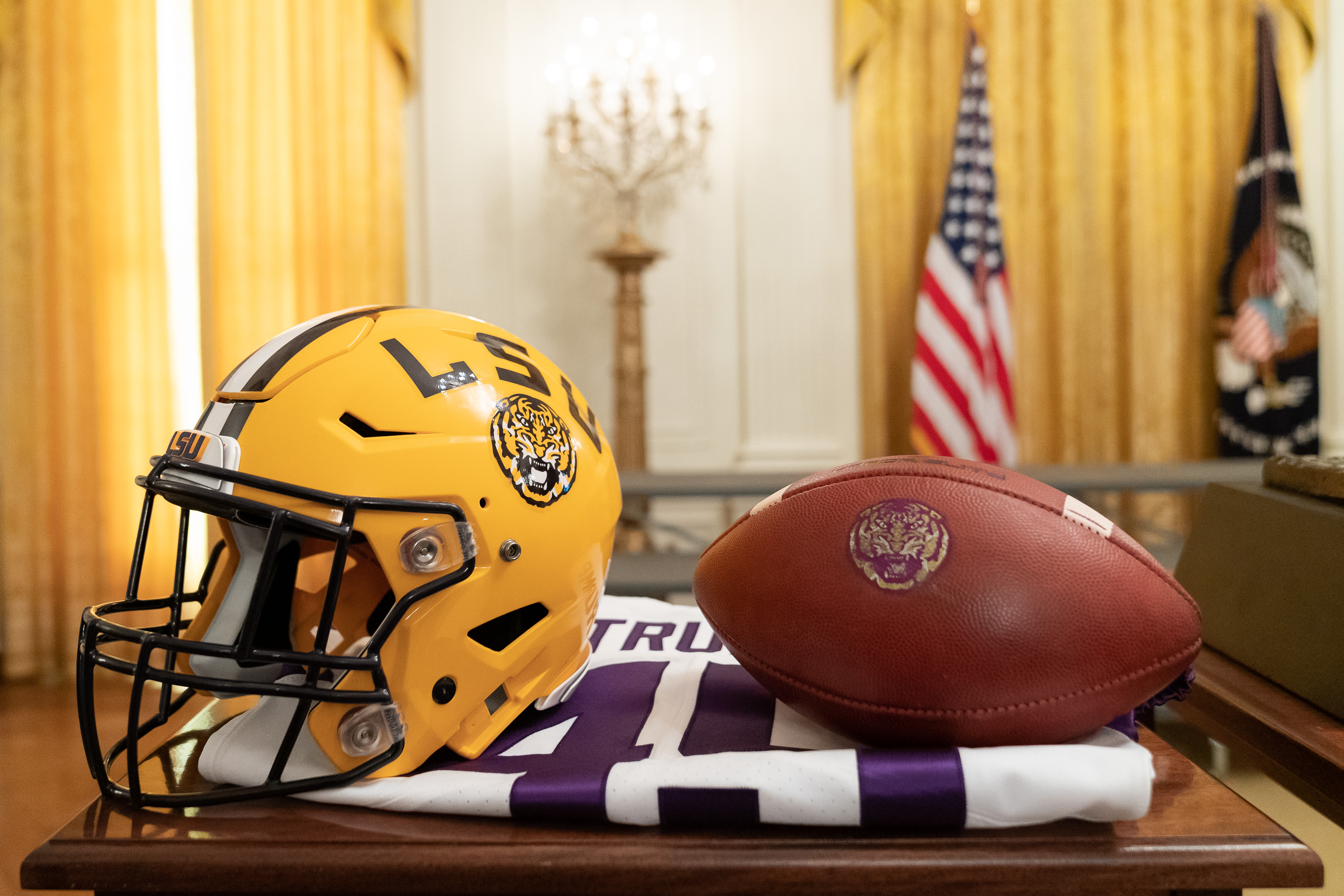
- Grambling State Tigers - Grambling
- Louisiana–Lafayette Ragin' Cajuns - Lafayette
- Louisiana–Monroe Warhawks - Monroe
- Louisiana Tech Bulldogs and Lady Techsters - Ruston
- LSU Tigers - Baton Rouge
- McNeese State Cowboys and Cowgirls - Lake Charles
- New Orleans Privateers - New Orleans
- Nicholls State Colonels - Thibodaux
- Northwestern State Demons - Natchitoches
- Southeastern Louisiana Lions - Hammond
- Southern Jaguars - Baton Rouge
- Tulane Green Wave - New Orleans

=== High school ===
- Louisiana High School Athletic Association

=== Stadiums and arenas ===
- Mercedes-Benz Superdome
- Ace W. Mumford Stadium
- Alario Center
- Baton Rouge River Center Arena
- BREC Memorial Stadium
- Burton Coliseum
- Cajundome
- Cajun Field
- CenturyLink Center
- Cowboy Stadium
- Eddie Robinson Stadium
- F.G. Clark Center
- Fant–Ewing Coliseum
- Fredrick C. Hobdy Assembly Center
- Harang Jr. Municipal Auditorium
- Harry Turpin Stadium
- Hirsch Memorial Coliseum
- Houma Terrebonne Civic Center
- Ike Hamilton Expo Center
- Independence Stadium
- Joe Aillet Stadium
- Lakefront Arena
- Lamar Dixon Expo Center
- Malone Stadium
- Manning Field at John L. Guidry Stadium
- Monroe Civic Center
- Pete Maravich Assembly Center
- Pontchartrain Center
- Prather Coliseum
- Rapides Parish Coliseum
- Smoothie King Center
- Stopher Gym
- Strawberry Stadium
- Sudduth Coliseum
- Tad Gormley Stadium
- Thomas Assembly Center
- Tiger Stadium
- University Center
- Yulman Stadium
- Zephyr Field
