= Pyrheliometer =

Instrument for measuring direct-beam solar irradiance

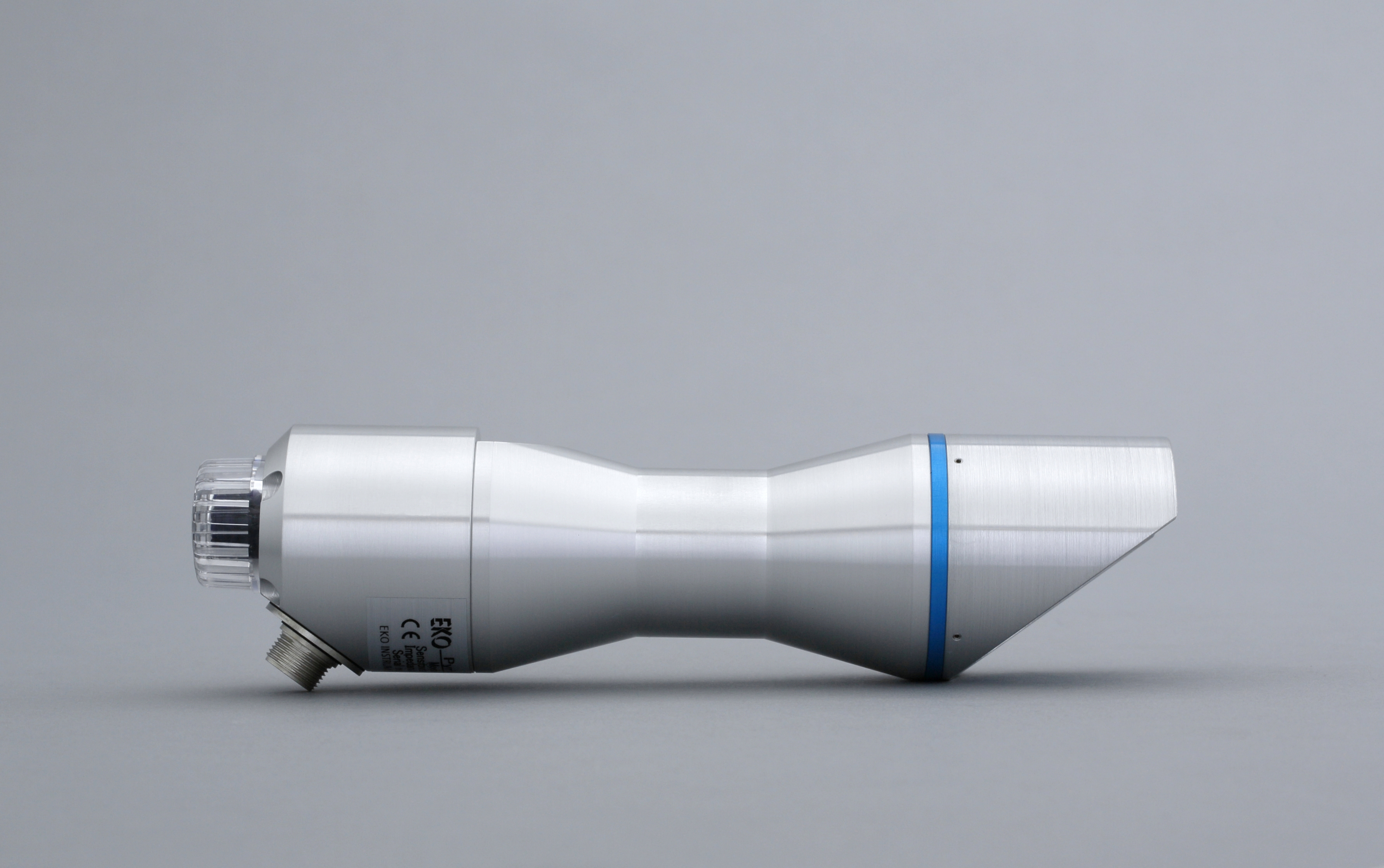
ISO 9060:2018 Class A, fast response & spectrally flat, pyrheliometer

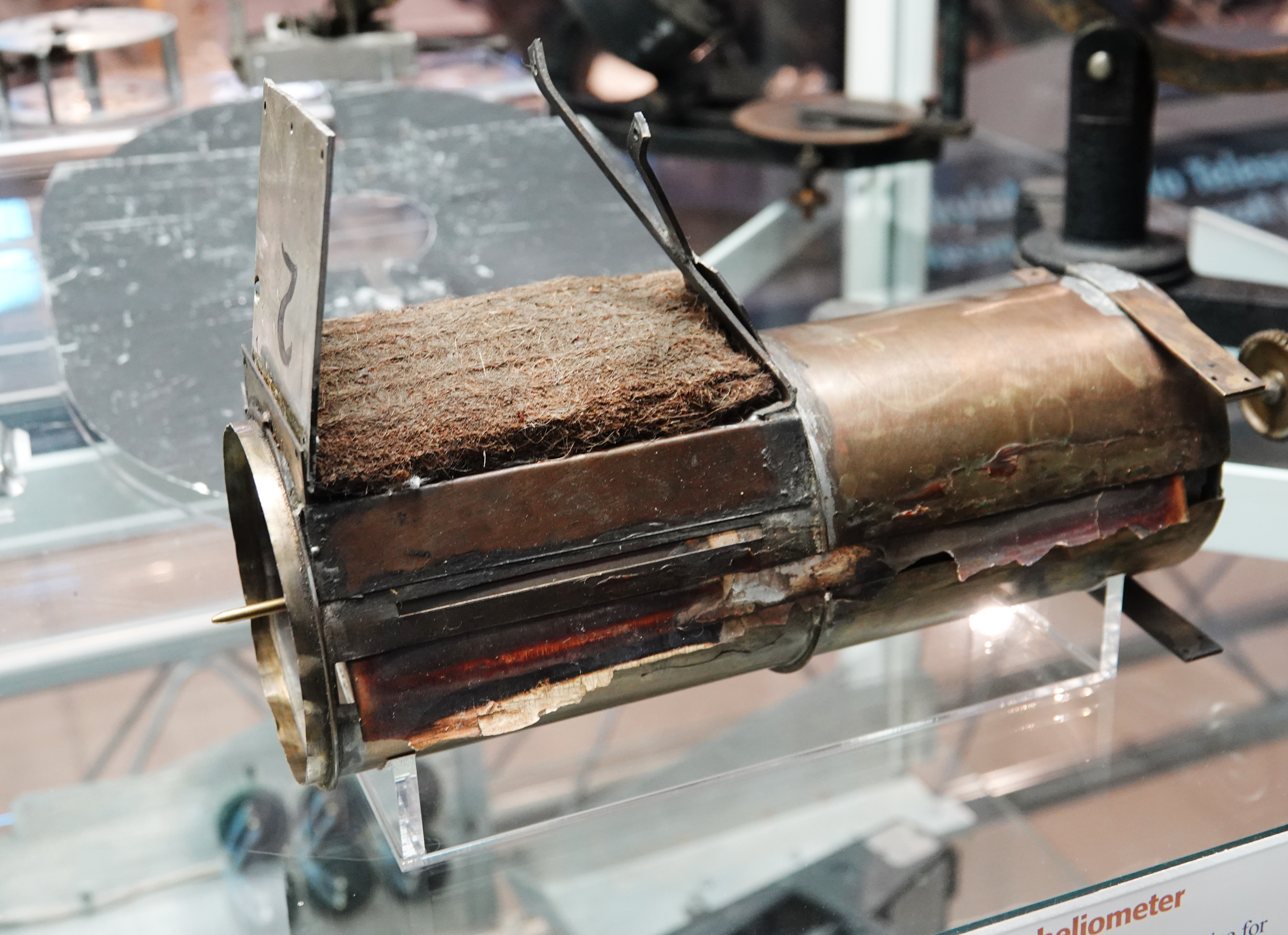
1913 Balloon Borne Pyrheliometer

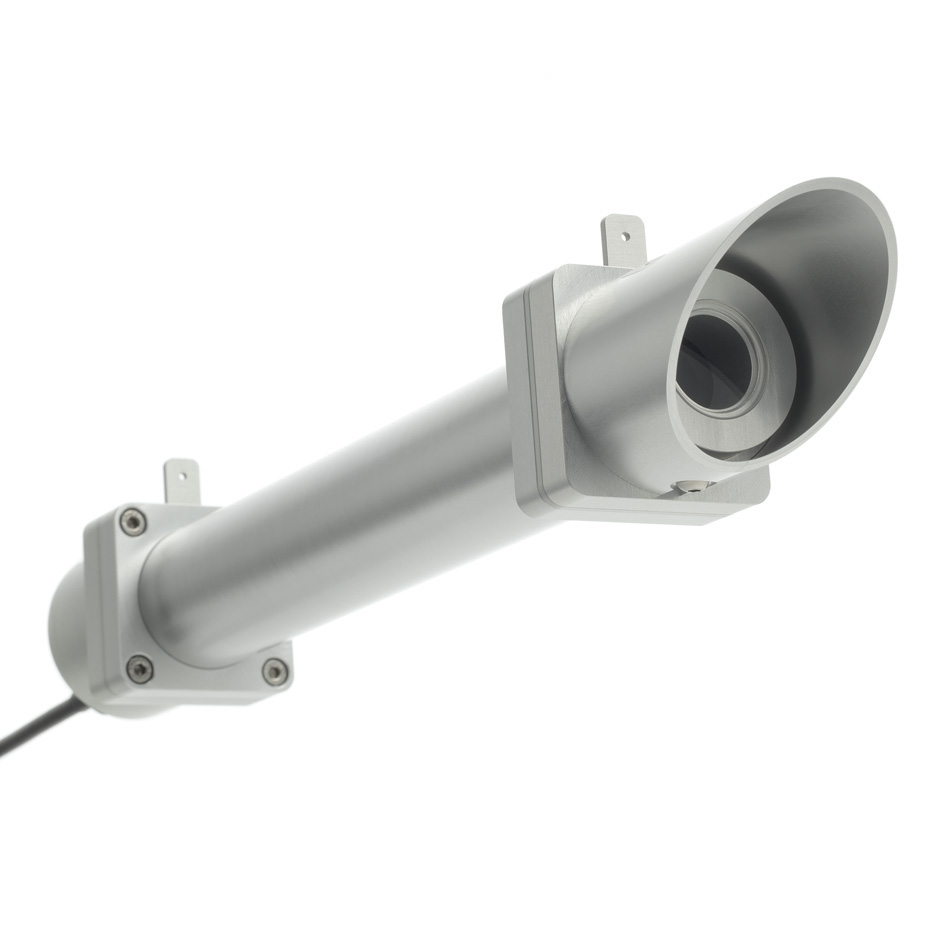
Typical pyrheliometer, for measurement of direct solar radiation

Pyrheliometer: (3) body, (4) protection cap, (5) window with heater, (2) sight, (1) humidity indicator, (7) cable

A pyrheliometer is an instrument that can measure direct beam solar irradiance. Sunlight enters the instrument through a window and is directed onto a thermopile which converts heat to an electrical signal that can be recorded. The signal voltage is converted via a formula to measure watts per square metre.

== Standards ==
Pyrheliometer measurement specifications are subject to International Organization for Standardization (ISO) and World Meteorological Organization (WMO) standards. Comparisons between pyrheliometers for intercalibration are carried out regularly to measure the amount of solar energy received. The aim of the International Pyrheliometer Comparisons, which take place every 5 years at the World Radiation Centre in Davos, is to ensure the world-wide transfer of the World Radiometric Reference. During this event, all participants bring their instruments, solar-tracking and data acquisition systems to Davos to conduct simultaneous solar radiation measurements with the World Standard Group.

== Applications ==
Typical pyrheliometer measurement applications include scientific meteorological and climate observations, material testing research, and assessment of the efficiency of solar collectors and photovoltaic devices.

== Usage ==
Pyrheliometers are typically mounted on a solar tracker. As the pyrheliometer only 'sees' the solar disk, it needs to be placed on a device that follows the path of the sun.

== See also ==
- Actinometer
- Active cavity radiometer
- Bolometer
- Pyrometer
- Solar constant
