= Active cavity radiometer =

Electrical-substitution instrument for measuring radiant power

An active cavity radiometer is an electrical substitution radiometer that measures incident radiant power by comparing the heating produced by radiation with that produced by an electrical heater. Instruments configured to observe the Sun are cavity pyrheliometers used to measure total and spectral solar irradiance.

== Operating principle ==
Incident radiation enters a highly absorptive cavity and is converted to heat. A feedback system maintains the cavity at a constant temperature by adjusting power to an electrical heater. A shutter alternately admits and blocks the external radiation; the reduction in electrical power required while the shutter is open is used to determine the incident radiant power. The cavity geometry redirects reflected radiation deeper into the receiver, increasing its effective absorption. The instrument's response time is largely determined by the thermal mass of the cavity.

Because electrical power can be measured accurately and related to SI units, the technique provides an absolute radiometric measurement rather than relying solely on comparison with an external radiation source.

== Applications ==
Active cavity radiometers have been used for long-term measurements of total solar irradiance. The Active Cavity Radiometer Irradiance Monitor instruments flew on the Solar Maximum Mission, the Upper Atmosphere Research Satellite, and ACRIMSAT.

Electrical-substitution cavity radiometers are also used for measurements of Earth's radiation budget and for laboratory radiometric calibration. The NISTAR instrument aboard DSCOVR uses three such radiometers to measure radiation from the sunlit Earth in broadband wavelength channels. A liquid-nitrogen-cooled instrument developed by the National Institute of Standards and Technology was designed for absolute measurements of infrared calibration sources.

== See also ==
- Radiometry
- Radiometer
- Solar irradiance
