= Nicola Scafetta =

Italian research scientist

- Born: Italy
- Education: University of Pisa, University of North Texas
- Scientific career
- Fields: Astronomy, Climatology, Physics
- Workplaces: University of Napoli Federico II
- Thesis: An entropic approach to the analysis of time series (2001)
- Doctoral advisor: Paolo Grigolini

Nicola Scafetta is a research scientist and at the University of Napoli Federico II. He was formerly at the ACRIM Lab group and an adjunct assistant professor in the physics department at Duke University. His research interests are in theoretical and applied statistics and nonlinear models of complex processes. He is notable for having controversial views on climate change.

== Early life and education ==
Scafetta was born in Italy. He received a Laurea in physics from the University of Pisa in 1997 and a Ph.D. in physics from the University of North Texas in 2001. His doctoral thesis was titled An entropic approach to the analysis of time series.

== Career ==
Scafetta was a research associate in the electrical and computer engineering department at Duke University from 2002 to 2003 and then a research scientist in the physics department from 2003 to 2009. He has been a visiting lecturer at Elon University and the University of North Carolina. Scafetta was a research associate at the ACRIM Lab group and an adjunct assistant professor in the physics department at Duke University for a few years after 2010. He is currently affiliated with the University of Napoli Federico II in Naples, Italy.

He is a member of the American Physical Society, American Geophysical Union and the American Association of Physics Teachers.

=== ACRIM ===
Scafetta argues that the total solar irradiance (TSI) measurements gathered by satellites since 1978 are flawed because the Space Shuttle Challenger disaster prevented the timely launching of the ACRIM 2 satellite, which he worked on, to replace ACRIM 1. This results in a two-year data gap in the ACRIM time series, which scientists bridge with overlapping data from several other satellites. They conclude that heating from the Sun did not increase between 1980 and 2002 and does not significantly contribute to the global surface warming over that period. Some ACRIM investigators, including principal investigator Richard Willson (Columbia) and Scafetta, disagree and argue for a significant upward trend in average solar luminosity during the two-year data-gap in the ACRIM time series. The Duke University student newspapers report that Scafetta and West's interpretation of Richard Willson's analysis is that "the sun may have minimally contributed about 10 to 30 percent of the 1980-2002 global surface warming."

=== Scientific contributions ===
Scafetta developed "Diffusion Entropy Analysis", a method of statistical analysis which distinguishes between Levy Walk noises and Fractional Brownian motion in complex systems. Scafetta used this method in a 2002 analysis of teen pregnancy.

== Views on climate change ==
Scafetta has argued, "At least 60% of the warming of the Earth observed since 1970 appears to be induced by natural cycles which are present in the solar system," instead claiming that climate is modulated by astronomical oscillations. Scafetta's climate model is based primarily on a comparison of periodic changes of global surface temperature and the Sun's periodic movement around barycenter of the Solar System, as well as solar, lunar, and planetary cycles.

In 2009, Scafetta faced criticism for failing to disclose the computer code required to reproduce his research. Scafetta responded by saying that the code in question had been submitted to a scientific journal and that if "the journal takes its time to publish it, it is not our fault."

In a 2011 article published in The Open Atmospheric Science Journal ecologist Craig Loehle of the National Council for Air and Stream Improvement (a forest industry institution) and Scafetta forecast that the world climate "may remain approximately steady until 2030-2040, and may at most warm 0.5-1.0°C by 2100 at the estimated 0.66°C/century anthropogenic warming rate".

In 2020, Scafetta proposed a 60-year cycle in the amount of interplanetary dust entering Earth's atmosphere, modulated by variations in the orbit of Jupiter's eccentricity, as causing variations in the relative abundance of cloud cover and thus being a driver of climate change by affecting variations in albedo.

In 2022, Scafetta wrote a paper claiming that equilibrium climate sensitivity was significantly lower than what Coupled Model Intercomparison Project (phase 6) (CMIP6) predict.

== Selected publications ==
- Nicola Scafetta, Patti Hamilton and Paolo Grigolini, "The thermodynamics of social process: the teen birth phenomenon," Fractals, 9, 193-208 (2001).
- Nicola Scafetta, Sergio Picozzi and Bruce J. West, "An out-of-equilibrium model of the distributions of wealth" Quantitative Finance 4, 353-364 (2004)."
- Nicola Scafetta and Bruce J. West, "Multiresolution diffusion entropy analysis of time series: an application to births to teenagers in Texas" Chaos, Solitons & Fractals 20, 119 (2004).
- Nicola Scafetta, and Paolo Grigolini, "Scaling detection in time series: diffusion entropy analysis," Phys. Rev. E 66, 036130 (2002)."
- Nicola Scafetta, Richard Moon, and Bruce J. West, "Fractal Response of Physiological Signals to Stress Conditions, Environmental Changes and Neurodegenerative Diseases," Complexity 12, 12-17 (2007).
- Nicola Scafetta, and Bruce J. West, "Phenomenological reconstructions of the solar signature in the NH surface temperature records since 1600." J. Geophys. Res., 112, D24S03, doi:10.1029/2007JD008437 (2007).
- N. Scafetta, "Empirical analysis of the solar contribution to global mean air surface temperature change," Journal of Atmospheric and Solar-Terrestrial Physics 71, 1916–1923 (2009), doi:10.1016/j.jastp.2009.07.007.
- Nicola Scafetta and Richard Willson, "ACRIM-gap and Total Solar Irradiance (TSI) trend issue resolved using a surface magnetic flux TSI proxy model", Geophysical Research Letter 36, L05701, doi:10.1029/2008GL036307 (2009).
- Craig Loehle and Nicola Scafetta, "Climate Change Attribution Using Empirical Decomposition of Climatic Data," The Open Atmospheric Science Journal, 2011 5, 74-86. Full text (Loehle & Scafetta Supplemental Info)

== See also ==
- List of University of North Texas alumni
