= ACRIMSAT =

Satellite of NASA's Earth Observing System program

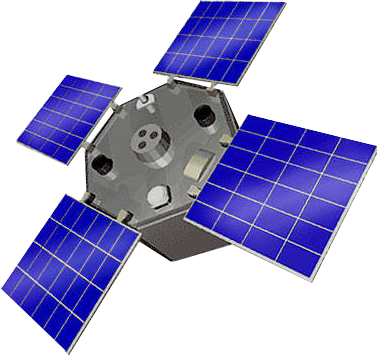
- ACRIMSAT satellite
- Names: Active Cavity Radiometer Irradiance Monitor Satellite
- Mission type: Solar astronomy
- Operator: NASA / JPL
- COSPAR ID: 1999-070B
- SATCAT no.: 26033
- Website: acrim.jpl.nasa.gov
- Mission duration: 5 years (planned); 13 years, 11 months and 23 days (achieved)

Spacecraft properties
- Manufacturer: Orbital Sciences Corporation
- Launch mass: 115 kg (254 lb)
- Dimensions: 77.5 cm (30.5 in) wide 66 cm (26 in) high Total span with solar arrays 178 cm (70 in)
- Power: 80 watts

Start of mission
- Launch date: 21 December 1999, 07:13 UTC
- Rocket: Taurus 2110
- Launch site: Vandenberg, LC-576E
- Contractor: Orbital Sciences Corporation
- Entered service: April 2000

End of mission
- Deactivated: 30 July 2014
- Last contact: 14 December 2013

Orbital parameters
- Reference system: Geocentric orbit
- Regime: Sun-synchronous orbit
- Perigee altitude: 683 km (424 mi)
- Apogee altitude: 727 km (452 mi)
- Inclination: 98.30°
- Period: 99.00 minutes

Instruments
- Active Cavity Radiometer Irradiance Monitor-3 (ACRIM-3)

The Active Cavity Radiometer Irradiance Monitor Satellite, or ACRIMSAT was a satellite carrying the ACRIM-3 (Active Cavity Radiometer Irradiance Monitor 3) instrument. It was one of the 21 observational components of NASA's Earth Observing System program. The instrument followed upon the ACRIM-1 and ACRIM-2 instruments that were launched on multi-instrument satellite platforms. ACRIMSAT was launched on 20 December 1999 from Vandenberg Air Force Base as the secondary payload on the Taurus launch vehicle that launched KOMPSAT. It was placed into a high inclination of 98.30°, at 720 km. Sun-synchronous orbit from which the ACRIM-3 instrument monitored total solar irradiance (TSI). Contact with the satellite was lost on 14 December 2013.

== History ==
ACRIM-3 made measurements of the TSI since the start of its mission in April 2000. It extended the TSI measurement database begun by earlier ACRIM instruments on the NASA Solar Maximum Mission (SolarMax) (ACRIM-1: 1980–1989) and Upper Atmosphere Research Satellite (UARS) (ACRIM-2: 1991–2001).

ACRIMSAT/ACRIM3 tracked TSI during a 2004 transit of Venus and measured the 0.1% reduction in the solar intensity caused by the planet's shadow. It also recorded data for the Transit of Venus, 2012.

== Team ==
Richard C. Willson was the principal investigator and led the science team. Willson designed the active cavity radiometer type of sensor used by self-calibrating satellite TSI monitoring experiments. The ACRIM3 instrument was a collaboration between Willson, original JPL/ACRIMSAT Project manager Ronald Zenone and ACRIM3 Instrument Scientist Roger Helizon. The mission was controlled using the ACRIMSAT tracking station at the Jet Propulsion Laboratory (JPL) Table Mountain Observatory in Southern California. Co-investigators were: Nicola Scafetta (climate impact of solar variability), Hugh Hudson (solar physics) and Alexander Mordvinov (solar physics).

== ACRIMSAT instrument ==
The ACRIMSAT instrument and spacecraft represent a unique, new capability for NASA research. The instrument is lighter and more compact than its predecessor by a factor of more than two. This allows the radiometer to be flown in a small, dedicated spacecraft like the ACRIMSAT. The satellite/radiometer combination is small enough to be easily launched as a secondary payload on any of an array of boosters, providing its sponsors with the flexibility of numerous launch opportunities while keeping launch costs to a minimum. The active cavity radiometer instrument is designed for precise, continuous measurements of total solar irradiance in spaceflight experiments and is capable of measuring solar energy in the far-ultraviolet to far-infrared wavelength range. The instrument includes three identical active cavity radiometers that are used in different cycles. One monitors the Sun all the time. Data from the second instrument will be compared to data from the first instrument once every few months. The third sensor's data will be used as a comparison with the first and second instruments' data once every two months. With this rotating system of data comparison, anticipated slow changes in the first sensor, caused by exposure to the Sun and space, will be calibrated and removed from its measurement results.

== Technology ==
ACRIMSAT was a spin-stabilized, single-purpose satellite constructed by Orbital Sciences Corporation. Its total cost, including the instrument, launch, ground station, operations, and science team activities during its 14-year mission was less than US$50 million.

== End of the mission ==
In December 2013, ACRIMSAT suffered a mission-ending failure when its degrading batteries could no longer sustain operations. The spacecraft has not responded to ground commands since on 14 December 2013. After several unsuccessful recovery attempts and extensive failure analysis, the mission was determined to be unrecoverable and officially terminated on 30 July 2014.

The spacecraft will remain in orbit for approximately 64 years before returning to Earth.
