= Charles Fern =

American journalist and aviator (1892–1995)

- Born: Charles J. Fern; June 20, 1892
- Died: March 29, 1995 (aged 102)
- Known for: First round trip between O‘ahu and Maui
- Spouse: Mary Gillespie
- Relatives: Charlie Fern, niece
- Awards: Hawaii Publishers Association Hall of Fame
- Aviation career
- First flight: May 9, 1920; Matson freighter
- Famous flights: First commercial flight in Hawaii
- Air force: Army Air Corps
- Battles: World War I

Charles J. "Charlie" Fern (June 20, 1892 – March 29, 1995), a barnstorming Hawaii aviator and newspaper pioneer, was a University of California, Berkeley graduate and a World War I pilot. Fern lived to be 102.

== Biography ==
Fern, who was raised in the Madison Barracks community in Sackets Harbor, New York, arrived in the Hawaiian Islands in 1919. With partner Ben Stoddard, they barnstormed in Honolulu at Kapi‘olani Park, where they flew passengers 10 minutes for $10 each. Fern's plane, 20-gallon tank, two-cockpit, single-engine Jenny, was brought to the Islands on a Matson freighter. On February 1, 1920, Fern, who learned to fly in the Army Air Corps during World War I, carried the first paying passenger on an inter-island flight, giving him the distinction of being the first commercial pilot in Hawaii. In addition, on May 9, 1920, Fern made the first round trip between O‘ahu and Maui in the same plane, JN4D Jenny, “Aloha Hawaii,” with its 90-horsepower OX5 engine and enough fuel to cruise for 2 1/2 hours, and then flew on to Kaua‘i. He became known as “Mr. Kaua‘i" and was eventually inducted into the Hawaii Publishers Association Hall of Fame.

In 1927 he formed the first Kauai barefoot football league. In 1938 he built Kauai's first radio station, KOWY (later renamed KTOH). During World War II, Fern published the Cow Eye Sentinel, a weekly paper for soldiers stationed on Kauai. Eventually he became owner of The Garden Island, where he worked for 44 years, but sold the paper and radio station when he retired to Honolulu in 1966.

== Family ==
In 1922 Fern married Mary Gillespie. A son, Mike Fern, went on to become an editor at The Garden Island. A great-niece, Charlene "Charlie" Fern, nicknamed after him, also became a newspaper reporter, editor and, a White House speechwriter.

== See also ==
- List of radio stations in Hawaii
