= Charlie Fern =

American journalist

- Born: Charlene Fern; 1968 (age 57–58); Newport, Rhode Island
- Education: University of North Texas (1990)
- Occupations: Business owner, Public speaker, Adjunct professor, Speechwriter, Journalist
- Notable credit(s): Award-winning journalist, White House speechwriter, speechwriter for First Lady Laura Bush, adjunct professor of public relations, public speaker, publicist and consultant.
- Children: Elliot Moore
- Relatives: great-uncle Charles J. Fern
- Family: daughter of Col. Albert Fern (USA-ret.)
- Website: http://www.charliefernink.com/

Charlene "Charlie" Fern (born in 1968) is an American speechwriter, business owner, public speaker and journalist who served as First Lady Laura Bush's speechwriter for six years, first in the Texas Governor's Office, then at the White House, through October 2002. Fern's speeches included the first Presidential radio address delivered by a U.S. First Lady, in November 2001, and a May 2002 Radio Free Afghanistan address, following the September 11 attacks. She also wrote for President George W. Bush.

== Early life and education ==
Fern was born in Newport, Rhode Island, and spent her childhood and school-age years in Fairfax County, Virginia, Carmel-by-the-Sea, California, and Dallas, Texas. Fern graduated from Lakeview High School in Garland, Texas.

In 1990, she earned a bachelor's degree in journalism from the University of North Texas where she was a member of the Kappa Tau Alpha honor society. While in college, she worked as a reporter and editor on the school's newspaper, the North Texas Daily. Also during college, she worked for the Denton Record-Chronicle, first in the press shop, then as a sports stringer covering Denton County high school football and as a freelance lifestyles writer.

== Career ==
After college, Fern joined the Galveston Daily News as a writer and lifestyles editor until, six months later, she was offered a reporting position at the San Diego Union-Tribune. After a year, Charlie, at age 23, was promoted to managing editor of Universal Press Syndicate's A&M Publications. While there, she wrote, edited and directed the news content for four publications in north San Diego County, including The Vista Press, a daily newspaper.

In the mid-1990s she took a job writing proclamations and greetings in the state office of Governor Ann Richards. From there, she became a press officer and speechwriter for First Lady Laura Bush. She worked in that capacity until the 2000 presidential campaign, when she moved to the Texas Attorney General's Office to work for then-Attorney General John Cornyn as press aide and chief speechwriter.

In January 2001, she moved to Washington, D.C., following Mrs. Bush to the White House as her personal speechwriter and spokesperson. On November 8, 2001, the First Lady gave a speech written by Fern to the National Press Club and talked about the 9/11 terrorist attacks and how it was becoming a defining tragedy for youth. During her stay at the White House, Ms. Fern worked with presidential speechwriters Michael Gerson, Matthew Scully, Pete Wehner and David Frum in offices inside the Old Executive Office Building and, later, in the East Wing. She also wrote speeches for U.S. Navy ship dedications, toasts and roasts for heads of state, White House Conferences, Congressional Testimonies, and United Nations hearings.

In November 2003, Fern joined the public affairs team at Merck & Co., based in Whitehouse Station, New Jersey. After a year, she returned to Austin, Texas, to start a family and begin the Charlie Fern Ink consulting firm. She was vice president of the Friends of Texas Public Schools. She also worked, beginning in 2018, as vice president of global communications for HomeAway.

Fern is the owner and principal of Charlie Fern Ink, LLC, a communications consultancy based in Austin, Texas. She provides public relations, publicity, promotions, writing, and strategic messaging services for nationally known and recognized leaders and executives, celebrities, musicians, media, public and private organizations, and non-profits. She delivers lectures on communications-related topics throughout the country. She continues writing speeches on a selective basis. In March 2008, a speech written by Fern about young children reading less, given by Laura Bush to the Association of American Publishers, made national news when it ran across Scripps Howard New Service's wire. Mrs. Bush said, "That's not because they can't read. It's because they think they don't enjoy reading."

She also served as an adjunct professor at St. Edward's University in Austin, Texas, from 2009 to 2012.

== Awards ==
Fern was inducted into the Texas Intercollegiate Press Association's Hall of Fame during its 2016 annual conference in Dallas.

== Family ==
Fern is the grand-niece of the late newspaperman Charles "Charlie" Fern (after whom she was nicknamed), who was an aviator, barnstormer and longtime editor of The Garden Island newspaper in Hawaii. Her father, Col. Albert Fern (retired), a West Point Military Academy graduate, also wrote a column, "Fern's Turn," and edited The Russ newspaper at San Diego High School his senior year.

Charlie Fern lives in Austin, Texas.

== See also ==
- List of University of North Texas people
