= Rob Erdle =

American artist (1949–2006)

- Born: August 17, 1949; Selma, California
- Died: December 30, 2006 (aged 57)
- Known for: Watercolor

Robert Leigh Erdle known as Rob Erdle (17 August 1949 – 30 December 2006) was a watercolorist and educator, and president of various arts associations. He exhibited his watercolors in over 200 shows, 47 of which were one-man exhibitions.

== Biography ==
Born in Selma, California, Erdle received his B.A. from California State University, Fresno, where he studied with Judy Chicago and Wayne Thiebaud, and his M.F.A. from Bowling Green University in Bowling Green, Ohio. In 1976, he joined the faculty at the University of North Texas in Denton, Texas where he taught undergraduate and graduate classes in painting and drawing for 30 years. He was head of their Watercolor Program from 1976 to 2001.

While teaching at the University of North Texas, he also was an instructor for ten years at the American College of Switzerland, a director of the Chautauqua Institution Art Gallery, Chautauqua, New York, and director of Pacific Union College's "Summer School of Art". For thirteen years he also taught at the Luxun Academy of Fine Arts in Shenyang, China, which awarded him the honor of Distinguished visiting professor.

For twenty years Erdle participated in Watercolor USA as an exhibitor, curator and judge. He was President of the Watercolor USA Honor Society housed at the Springfield Art Museum, Missouri, 1997-2000. Erdle was a juror for many watercolor exhibitions, including the National Watercolor Society, the Pittsburgh Aqueous Open, the Arizona Aqueous Open and Watercolor USA. He conducted seminars and lectures across the U.S. and in more than a dozen countries.

In 2006, University of North Texas established the Rob Erdle Award Fund, an endowment through private donors that provides financial support for watercolor students. Rob Erdle died on December 30, 2006, in Denton, Texas.

== Notable exhibits ==
- 1973 Watercolor USA recognition as outstanding young artist
- 1995 Shanghai State Art Museum in Shanghai, China
- 2006, July 14–September 3, Luminous Watercolors – The Works of Rob Erdle an 18-year Retrospective, Louisiana Art and Science Museum
- 2006, June 8 - June 11, "Recent American Watercolors" Solo Exhibition Niigata International Watercolor Exhibition and Conference Center, Niigata, Japan

== Publications ==
The Watercolors of Rob Erdle A survey book of works from 1972-2000 with 150 color plates, May 2000.

== Collections ==
Erdle's works are held in the art collections of, among others:

- New Orleans Museum of Art
- Ochsner Foundation
- Springfield Art Museum, Missouri
- State University of New York
- Chautauqua Institution
- College of the Ozarks
- Bowling Green University
- University of North Texas
- Shanghai - Chinese Artist Association
- Midwestern State University
- Illinois State University
- Northern Arizona University
- Luxun Fine Arts Academy
- Dalian University

== Awards ==
- Regents' Professor, University of North Texas
- President's Council Teaching Award, University of North Texas
- Distinguished Service for International Education Award, University of North Texas.
- Distinguished Alumni Commencement Award, Bowling Green University
- Honorary Award for Life Service, Chautauqua Art Association, Chautauqua Institution.
- Honorary President of the International Watercolor Institute, Niigata, Japan
