= Ike Hamilton Expo Center =

Indoor arena in West Monroe, Louisiana

Coordinates: 32.5055°N 92.1815°W

The Ike Hamilton Expo Center is a 2,900-seat multipurpose, indoor arena located in West Monroe, Louisiana. It is used primarily for rodeos and horse shows; however, in keeping with the arena's name, it can also be used for conventions, dog agility trials, monster truck rallies and trade shows. The arena contains 57,000 square feet (5,300 m^{2}) of floor space. The arena also contains meeting rooms and concession facilities, as well as an adjacent horse barn with 510 stalls and two warm-up areas.

Many events at Ike Hamilton Expo Center are free events. The exceptions are concerts, selected sporting events, and other paid admission events. The arena also derives its revenue from the nearby RV area. It takes two years for a typical event booked at the Ike to be held as scheduled, in contrast to most arenas.

The center was built under the administration of Mayor Dave Norris, who has held the office since 1978.

== See also ==
- List of convention centers in the United States
