= Miranda Dodson =

American musician (born 1980)

- Born: Miranda Nicole Skaggs; December 5, 1980 (age 45); Midland, Texas
- Origin: Austin, Texas
- Genres: Worship, Christian country, folk, alternative country, roots rock
- Occupations: Singer, songwriter, guitarist
- Instruments: Vocals, guitar
- Years active: 2010–present
- Website: mirandadodson.com

Miranda Nicole Dodson (née, Skaggs; born December 5, 1980) is an American Christian musician and folk singer-songwriter, who primarily plays an alternative country, roots rock, and a worshipful style of music. She has released one studio album, Change a Thing, in 2010, and an extended play, Ascend, in 2014.

== Early and personal life ==
Dodson was born Miranda Nicole Skaggs, on December 5, 1980, in Midland, Texas, the daughter of Timothy Bruce Skaggs and Jamie Leann Skaggs (née, Marks), while she went to college at the University of North Texas, graduating with her baccalaureate in Art Teacher Education. She resides in Austin, Texas, with her husband, Luke Dodson, and their three children, where they attend City Life Church, pastored by her brother-in-law.

== Music career ==
Her music recording career started in 2010, by releasing a studio album, Change a Thing, on June 15, 2010. The subsequent release, an extended play, Ascend, was released on March 25, 2014.

== Discography ==
Studio albums

- Change a Thing (June 15, 2010)

EPs

- Ascend (March 25, 2014)
