= Lamar Dixon Expo Center =

Multi-purpose event center in Gonzales, Louisiana

Coordinates: 30°11′49″N 90°57′28″W

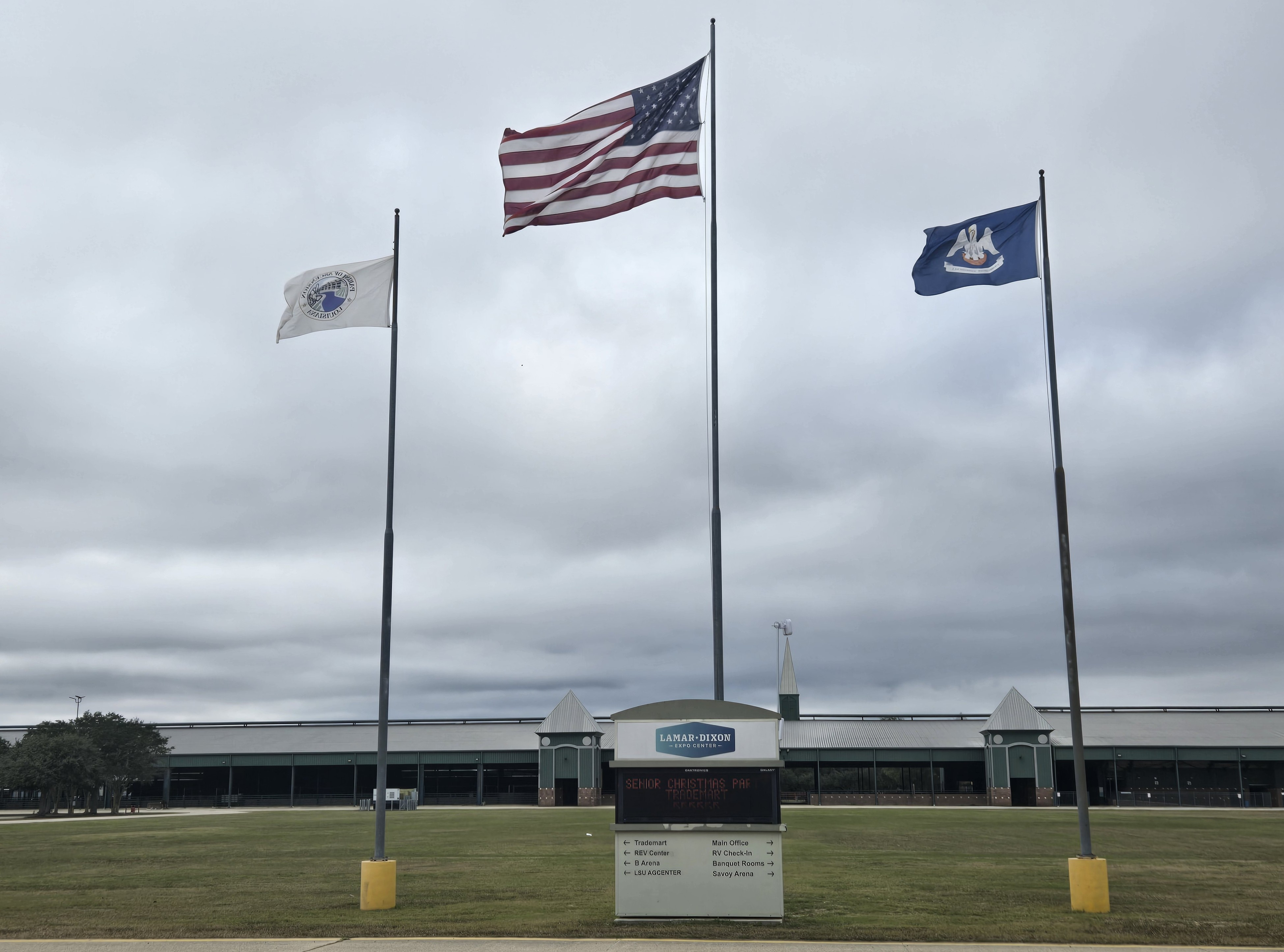
- Interactive map of Lamar Dixon Expo Center
- Location: 9039 South St. Landry Avenue, Gonzales, Louisiana 70737
- Owner: Ascension Parish, Louisiana
- Operator: Ascension Parish, Louisiana
- Capacity: 6,600 (Robbie G. Savoy Jr. Arena)

Construction
- Opened: 1999

The Lamar Dixon Expo Center is a multi-purpose event center in Gonzales, Louisiana, United States, built in 1999.

== Facilities ==
The facility can be used to host indoor football, basketball, volleyball, wrestling, equestrian events, rodeos, horse and cattle sales, horse shows, trade shows, rv/car/truck shows, craft shows, auctions, concerts, conventions, graduations, outdoor shows, gun shows, flea markets, dog & cat shows and other events.

- Ascension Gymnasium - A 24,000-square foot gymnasium used for basketball and volleyball.
- Arena B - 31,860-square foot arena with permanent seating for 1,500, concession stands and restrooms.
- Barns - Barns with 960 horse stalls (10’ x 10’ with a sand base) or 2,800 cattle tie spaces, with wash racks, restrooms, vet stocks and electric outlets.
- Building C - A 45,000-square foot roofed cattle holding pen.
- Chapel - A 175-200 seat chapel for weddings and other services, complete with a full sound system and a dressing/waiting area for the bride and groom.
- Outdoor Arena - A 42,000-square foot outdoor arena with lights and an announcer's stand.
- Robbie G. Savoy Jr. Arena - A 36,000-square foot arena with 6,600 permanent seats for indoor sports, concerts, and rodeo featuring bucking chutes and roping boxes, plus inner offices and a 12,500-square foot banquet room upstairs. In addition, it has an 800-square foot lounge with a bar area of 290 square feet, as well as a 5,200-seat banquet area which can be divided into three sections of 37’ x 40’, 33’ x 60’, and 37’ x 40’.
- RV park - Has 300 spaces, two restrooms/shower buildings, 25 spaces with 50 amps, 20 and 30 map at all hookups and has water and sewage.
- Multi Use Complex - 7 lighted and irrigated soccer fields - Each field is 220 x 330 ft. - Shade pavilion, concessions, restrooms with paved parking lot
- Trademart - A 24,000-square foot trademart with roll up doors, concessions and restrooms.
- 4-H building - 70,000 square foot multi use Exhibit Hall space

== History ==
The facility opened in 1999 as a privately owned Expo Center. The owners were Mary Lee and Bill Dixon. The facility was named using the Dixon family name along with Mary Lee Dixon's maiden name of Lamar. In 2009, it was purchased by Ascension Parish.

== Gallery ==
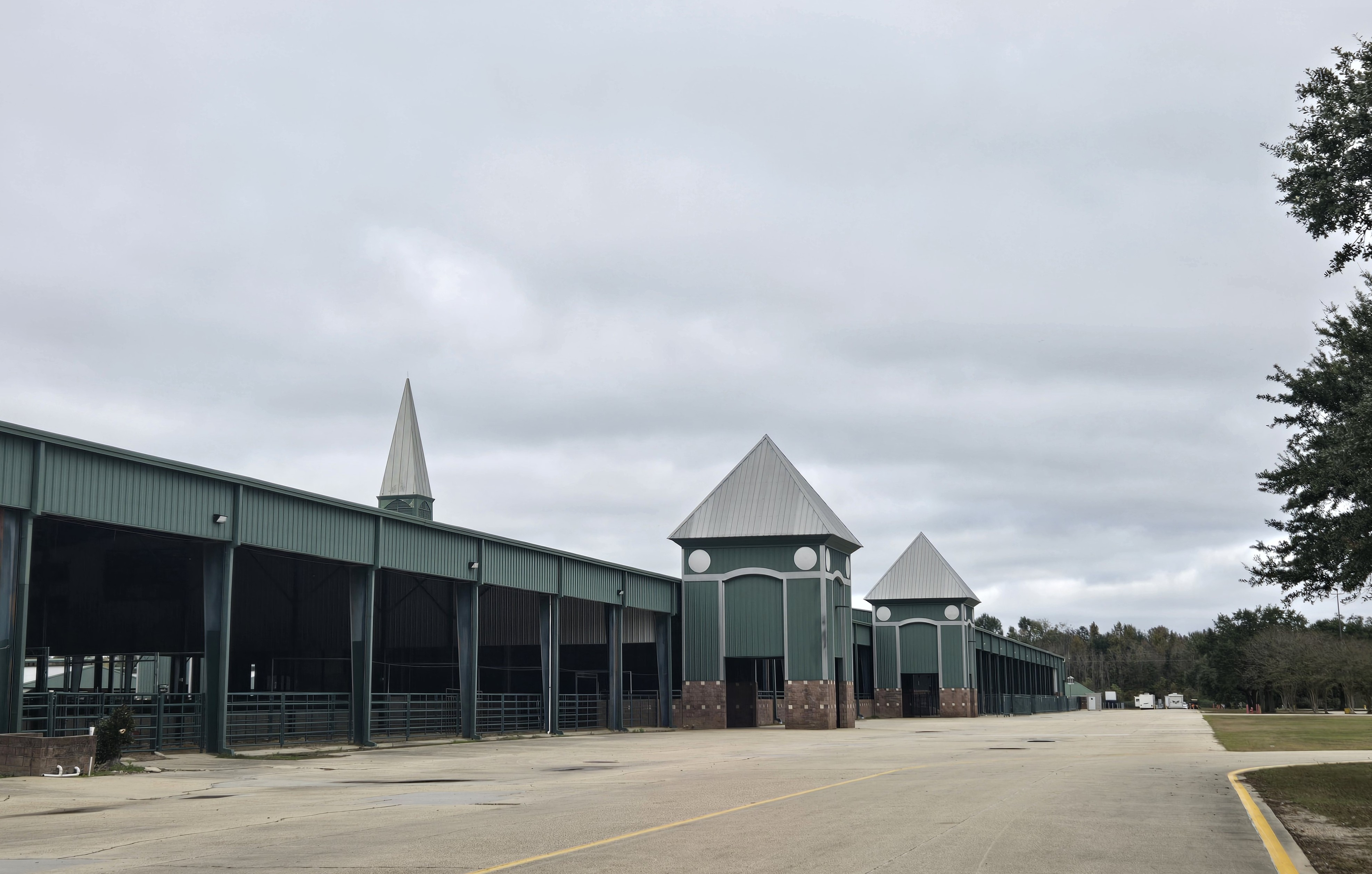
Robbie G. Savoy Jr. Arena and Arena B

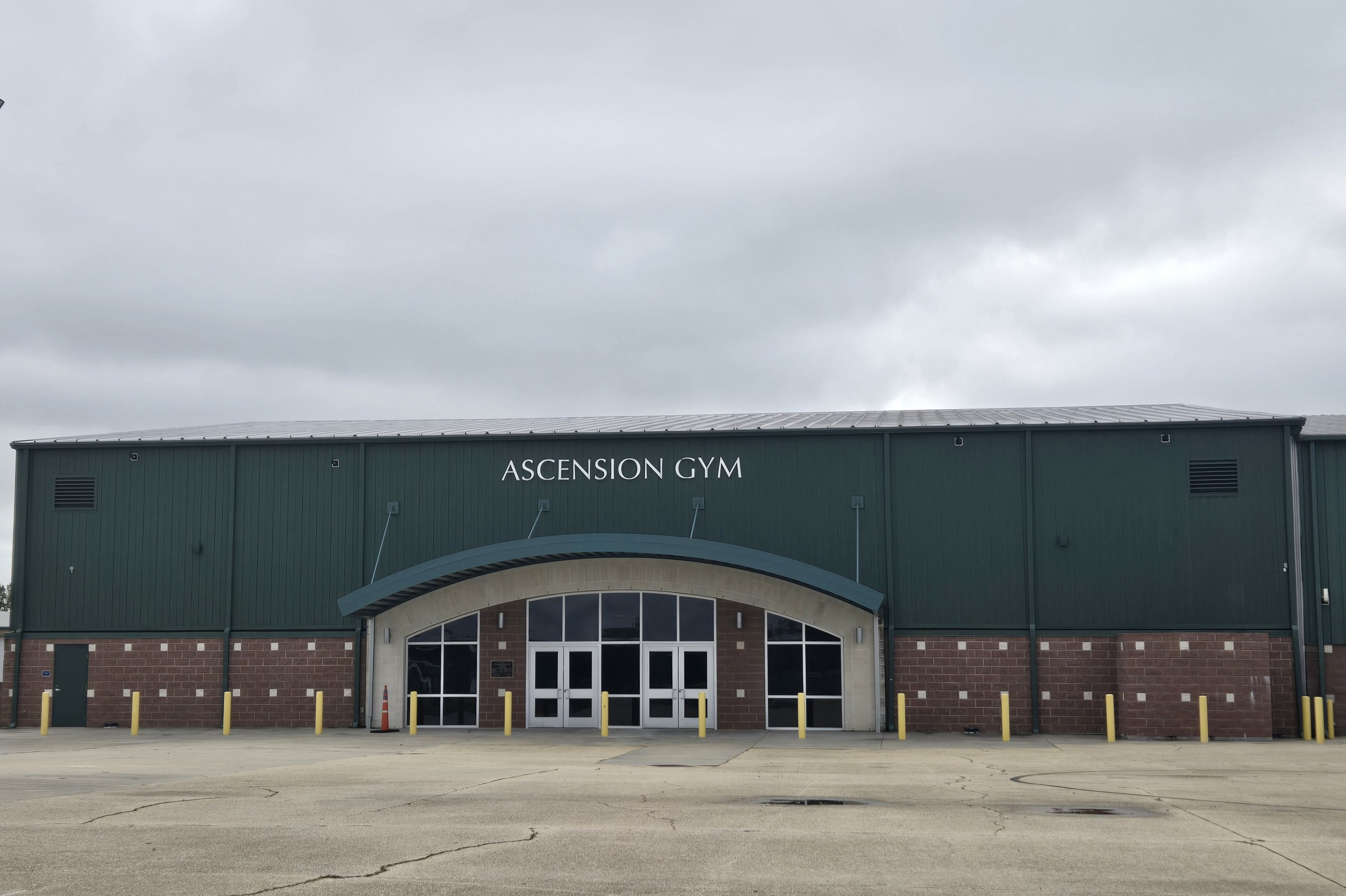
Ascension Gymnasium

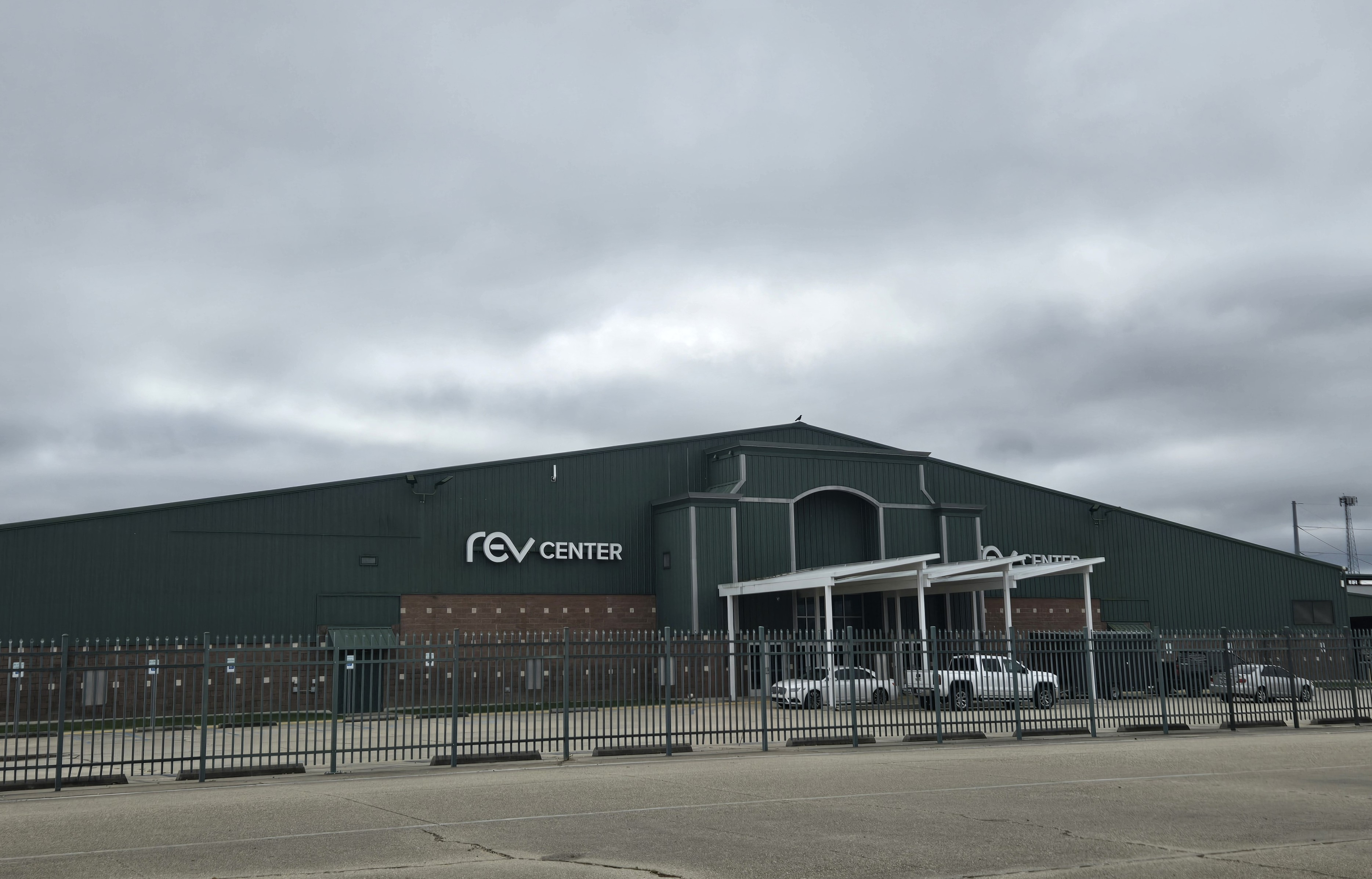
Rev Center

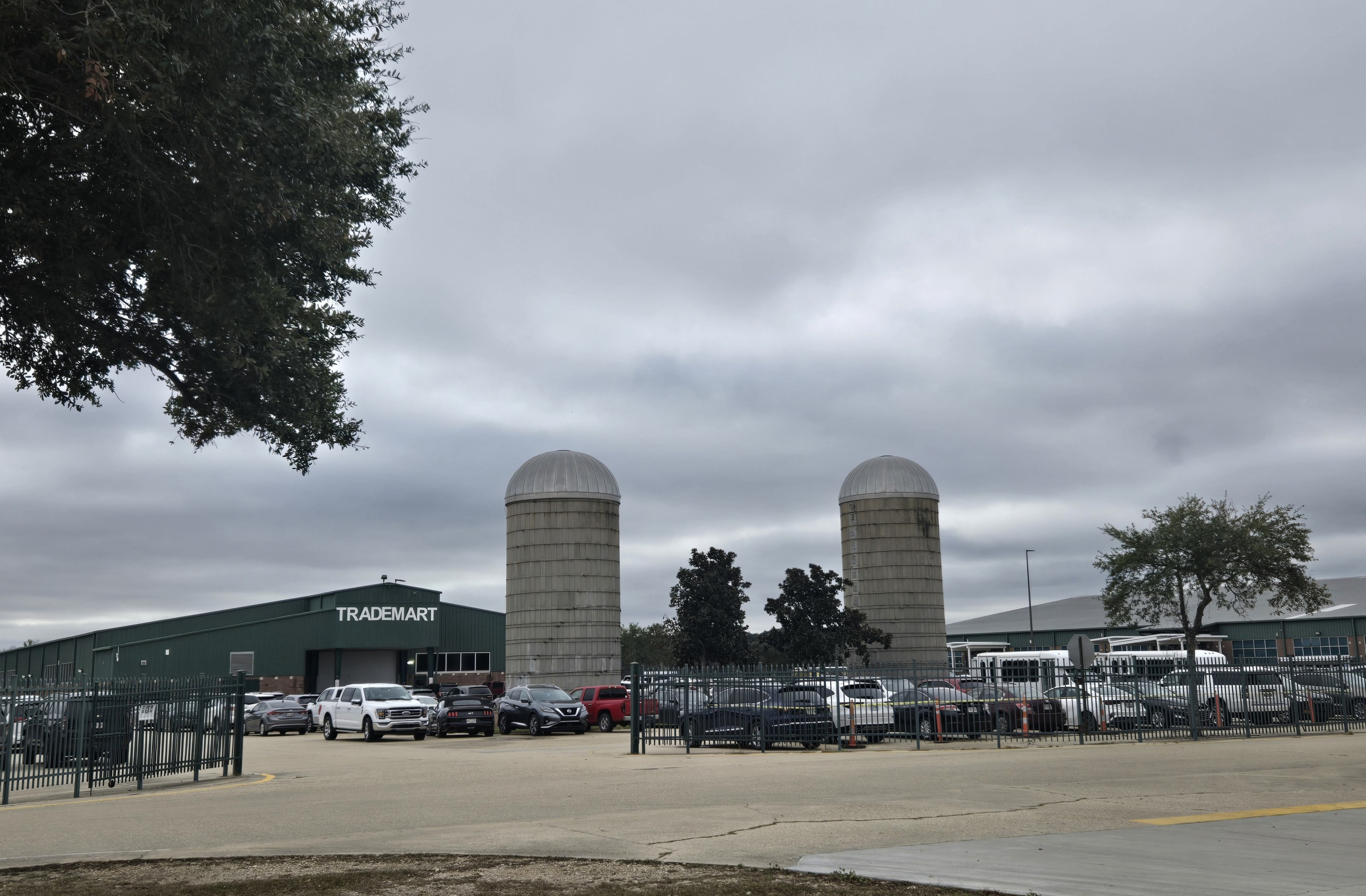
Trademart and 4-H Building

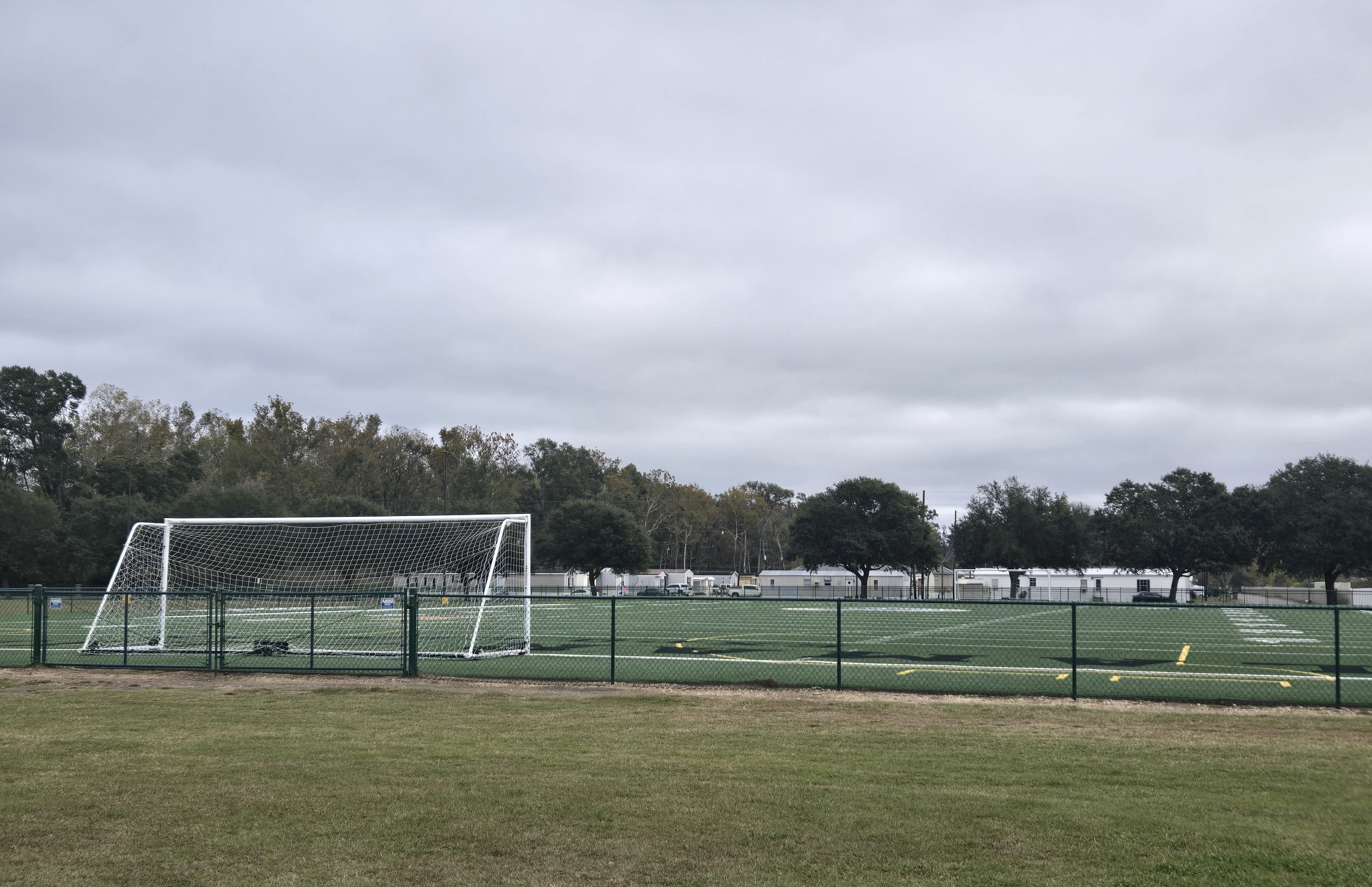
Turf Football and Soccer Fields

== See also ==
- List of music venues
