= Jeff M. Allen =

Professor of information science

- Born: 10/14/1968; Greenville, Texas
- Education: Penn State University
- Scientific career
- Fields: Information Science, Human Resource Development, Knowledge Management
- Institutions: University of North Texas

Jeff M. Allen is a Regents Professor of information science at the College of Information at the University of North Texas. His research and activities of interest include human resource development, knowledge management, wisdom, workforce development, and innovation.

Allen has served as a board member of the Academy of Human Resource Development, past editor-in-chief of the journals Performance Improvement Quarterly and Career and Technical Education Research, and is the founding editor of Learning and Performance Quarterly.

Allen earned a B.A.A.S. (Occupational and Vocational Education) and an M.S. (Industrial Technology) from the University of North Texas, and a Ph.D. in Human Resource Development from Pennsylvania State University.

== Books ==
- Alumneh, D., Allen, J., & Hawamdeh, S. (Eds.). (2017). Knowledge Discovery and Data Design Innovation. Hackensack, NJ: World Scientific. ISBN 978-9813234475
- Allen, J. (2022). Fostering Wisdom at Work. Rutledge Taylor & Francis Group.
- Gregson, J., & Allen, J. (Eds.). (2005). Leadership in career and technical education: Beginning the 21st century. University Council for Workforce and Human Resource Development.
