= JD Miller =

American painter

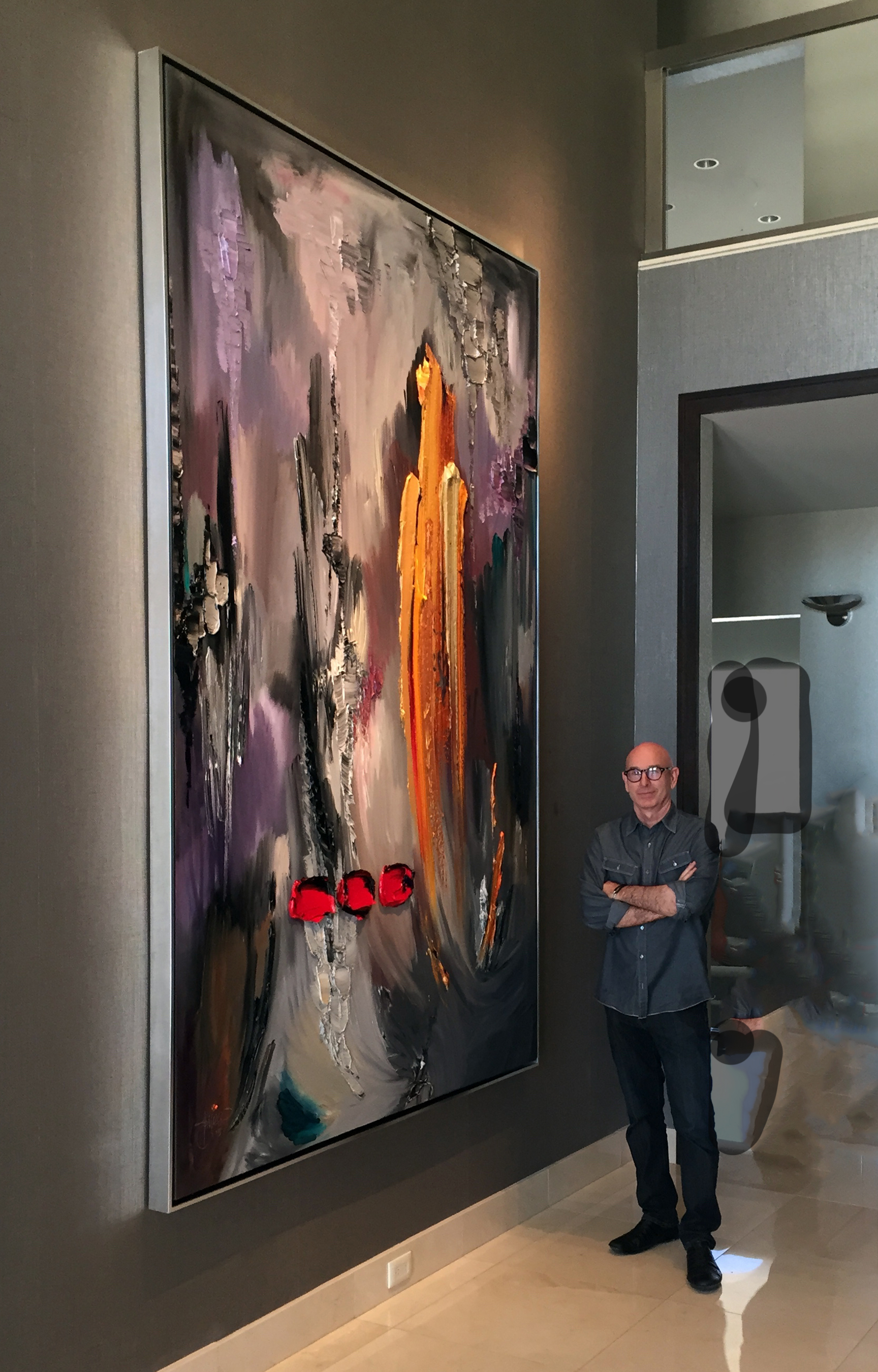
- Born: 1953 (age 72–73); California, U.S.
- Known for: Oil painting
- Movement: Reflectionism

JD Miller (born 1953) is a contemporary painter known for three-dimensional application of oil paint. In 2026, Miller introduced Reflectionism, a contemporary art movement that transforms traditional oil painting into three-dimensional experiences.

== Life and career ==
JD Miller was born in 1953 in San Diego, CA, and currently resides in Dallas, TX. In 2008, Miller's vision came to life when he partnered with Philip J. Romano to open Samuel Lynne Galleries in Dallas, TX. Now expanded to Chicago and Houston. Miller's work has expanded into museums such as the Jesuit Dallas Museum, the Meadows Museum, and the Longview Museum of Fine Arts.

=== Contemporary practice ===
Reflectionist artist JD Miller has been perfecting his style of 3-dimensional oil paintings for 25 years, from his first painting translations of classical works by artist like Pablo Picasso, Vincent van Gogh and Paul Gauguin to the creation and evolution of his own style. Miller imbues his prismatic work with a spirit of positive energy, love, peace, and joy as a fulfillment of his Reflectionist philosophy. Within Reflectionism, Miller calls upon the universal vibrations of light and sound to flow through him to allow for the molding of oil paint, a unique process that distinguishes him from other artists. His 3-dimensional oil paintings are represented in major art collections and museums throughout the United States.

== Awards and achievements ==
Among his achievements and honors, JD Miller received the 2007 Rising Star Award by Fashion Group International. JD was the Official Artist for the 40th Anniversary of Shakespeare Dallas. In 2013, Miller was the official fine art provider for the Hampton Classic Horse Show. In 2013, His artwork was selected to be displayed in the lobby of the modernist Patriot Tower, as part of a $100 million renovation. He was the official artist for the Aidmatrix and Elan Circle. In 2015, he was the official artist for the Dallas Opera. In 2017, Miller was the featured artist for Artsy Shark. In 2018, Miller was the featured speaker for Spirit is Ageless Award for C.C. Young. In 2023. American Airlines featured a videography, "Art in the Sky" with Miller's artwork shown on flights. Every year on Valentine's Day, Miller hosts a live painting show, showcasing his artistic talents in front of hundreds of people. This live painting has been going on for 10+ years.

== Charity work ==
Miller has helped raise funds for several foundations including the Dallas Children's Theater, Vox Humana Charity Event and Silent Auction, American Heart Association-Cotes de Coeur, Ronald McDonald House, Big Brothers, Big Sisters and Aidmatrix Digital Ball, Yellowstone Park Foundation, Hanger Busters, The Magellan International School, the Cattle Baron's Ball benefiting the American Cancer Society, DIFFA - Design Industries Foundation Fitting Aids and the Dallas Symphony Orchestra.

== Books ==
JD Miller, Reflectionist (2009) is a 127-page book with a selection of early oil and acrylic paintings. This book offers a glimpse into JD Miller's life and art-in harmony.

Reflections from Dragon Street (2022) is a 400-page book containing a selection of all of his most profound oil and acrylic paintings. Miller shows off his Reflectionism through three-dimensional paintings. This book features a mix media with collaborations from artists Tyler Shields and Lea Fisher.
