= Charles Mullins (physician executive) =

American physician (1934–2025)

Charles Brown Mullins (July 29, 1934 – December 4, 2025) was an American physician and the Ashbel Smith Emeritus Professor at the University of Texas Southwestern Medical Center. A cardiologist, Mullins served as the director of clinical cardiology and the cardiac catheterization lab at Parkland Hospital. Later, he was the executive vice chancellor for health affairs at the University of Texas System and the chief executive officer at Parkland.

== Education ==
Mullins earned an undergraduate degree from the University of North Texas in 1954. He graduated from medical school at UT Southwestern Medical Center. After an internship in Colorado, Mullins became a flight surgeon in the U.S. Air Force. He completed a residency at Parkland Hospital and was a research fellow at the National Heart Institute in Bethesda.

== Career ==
Mullins was a cardiologist at Parkland Hospital. He directed clinical cardiology and the cardiac catheterization lab there. He was on the faculty at the University of Texas Southwestern.

In 1979, Mullins was hired as Parkland's CEO. The year before, the hospital's new board of directors had made it a priority to look for a physician for the position, noting that other top public hospitals had physician leadership. During a two-year tenure as CEO, he facilitated the passage of a $90 million bond issue for improvements at the hospital, and the hospital improved its relationship with the University of Texas Southwestern. Mullins left Parkland in 1981 to serve as the executive vice president for health affairs at the University of Texas System.

Mullins rejoined the faculty at UT Southwestern in 2001. Mullins was named the Ashbel Smith Professor at UT Southwestern in 2004. He earned emeritus status at UT Southwestern in 2005.

Mullins was a past president of the Texas Medical Association's 50-Year Club, a group of physicians who graduated from medical school more than 50 years ago. In 2011, he reflected on the technological advances in medicine over his career, recalling that he once inserted pacemakers that were twice as large as a pack of cigarettes; pacemakers in the 21st century were about the size of a fifty-cent piece.

== Personal life and death ==
Mullins was married to Stella Mullins, the former president and CEO of Mental Health America of Texas, until her 2012 death. They had two children. The University of North Texas named Charles Mullins a distinguished alumnus in 1989. After retiring from medical practice, he served on the board of directors for the People's Community Clinic, a charity medical clinic in Austin. Mullins died in Austin, Texas, on December 4, 2025, at the age of 91.
