= Charles Buddie Mullins =

American chemical engineer

C. Buddie Mullins
- Education: University of Texas at Austin (B.S. Physics, 1975; M.S. Engineering, 1977); University of Tennessee, Knoxville (B.S. Chemical Engineering, 1982); California Institute of Technology (Ph.D. Chemical Engineering, 1990)
- Known for: Heterogeneous catalysis; surface science; materials for energy conversion
- Scientific career
- Fields: Chemical engineering, Surface science, Physical chemistry
- Institutions: University of Texas at Austin

Charles Buddie Mullins is an American chemical engineer, currently the Melvin H. Gertz Regents Chair Professor at the University of Texas at Austin, where he leads a research group focused on meterials chemistry for energy.

== Education ==
Mullins earned a Bachelor of Science degree in physics from the University of Texas at Austin in 1975 and a Master of Science in engineering from the same institution in 1977. He subsequently completed a Bachelor of Science in chemical engineering at the University of Tennessee, Knoxville in 1982.

He pursued graduate study in chemical engineering at the California Institute of Technology, where he received his Ph.D. in chemical engineering in 1990.

== Postdoctoral research ==
Following his doctoral work, Mullins carried out postdoctoral studies at the IBM Almaden Research Center in the Physical Sciences Division from 1989 to 1991. At IBM Almaden, he worked on surface chemistry and catalysis on well-defined materials, using surface science approaches to investigate fundamental reaction mechanisms at solid–gas and solid–vacuum interfaces.

== Academic career ==
Mullins joined the faculty of the University of Texas at Austin in 1991 as an assistant professor in the McKetta Department of Chemical Engineering. He later received a joint appointment in the Department of Chemistry and has held several endowed positions, including the Matthew Van Winkle Regents Professorship, the Z. D. Bonner Professorship, and the Melvin H. Gertz Regents Chair in Chemical Engineering.

At the University of Texas at Austin, Mullins has taught undergraduate and graduate courses in transport phenomena, electrochemistry, and materials chemistry. He has supervised numerous doctoral students and postdoctoral researchers who have gone on to academic and industrial careers in catalysis, electrochemistry, and materials science.
