= 2011 Huntington Hammer season =

Sports season

- Owner: Cecil Vandyke; Bill Nichols; Rick Kranz
- General manager: Steve Fickert
- Head coach: Josh Resignalo
- Home stadium: Big Sandy Superstore Arena; One Civic Center Plaza; Huntington, WV 25701

Results
- Record: 7–7
- League place: 4th
- Playoffs: Lost Semifinals 4–20 (Drillers)

The 2011 Huntington Hammer season was the first season for the Ultimate Indoor Football League (UIFL) franchise. The Hammer were able to finish the season with a 7–7 record. In the playoffs, they were defeated by the Eastern Kentucky Drillers.

The team was owned by principal owner, Cecil Vandyke, along with co-owners Bill Nichols and Rick Kranz. On January 6, 2011, Josh Resignalo was named the first head coach in Hammer history. Resignalo was relieved on his coaching duties following an April 9 loss to the Saginaw Sting. Defensive coordinator, Michael Owens, was named the interim head coach.

== Schedule ==
Key: Win Tie Loss Bye

=== Regular season ===
Week	Day	Date	Opponent	Results		Location
Week	Day	Date	Opponent	Score	Record	Location
1	Sunday	February 20	Canton Cougars	W 41–26	1–0	Big Sandy Superstore Arena
2	Friday	February 25	at Eastern Kentucky Drillers	L 26–37	1–1	Eastern Kentucky Expo Center
3	BYE					
4	Sunday	March 13	at Saginaw Sting	W 38–37	2–1	Dow Event Center
5	Friday	March 18	Eastern Kentucky Drillers	W 39–28	3–1	Big Sandy Superstore Arena
6	Friday	March 25	Johnstown Generals	W 52–16	4–1	Big Sandy Superstore Arena
7	Friday	April 1	at Northern Kentucky River Monsters	L 40–69	4–2	The Bank of Kentucky Center
8	Saturday	April 9	Saginaw Sting	L 42–49	4–3	Big Sandy Superstore Arena
9	Sunday	April 17	at Johnstown Generals	L 32–33	4–4	Cambria County War Memorial Arena
10	Saturday	April 23	at Canton Cougars	W 67–33	5–4	Canton Memorial Civic Center
11	Saturday	April 30	Northern Kentucky River Monsters	L 23–44	5–5	Big Sandy Superstore Arena
12	Friday	May 6	at Johnstown Generals	L 15–41	5–6	Cambria County War Memorial Arena
13	Saturday	May 14	at Northern Kentucky River Monsters	L 28–34	5–7	The Bank of Kentucky Center
14	Saturday	May 21	Canton Cougars	W 56–35	6–7	Big Sandy Superstore Arena
15	Sunday	May 29	Saginaw Sting	W 44–43	7–7	Big Sandy Superstore Arena

=== Postseason schedule ===
Round	Day	Date	Opponent	Results		Location
Round	Day	Date	Opponent	Score	Record	Location
Semifinals	Saturday	June 4	at Eastern Kentucky Drillers	L 4–20	0–1	Eastern Kentucky Expo Center

== Standings ==
2011 UIFL standings (Note: http://www.theuifl.com/01/UIFLStats/confsked.htm)
Team	W	L	T	PCT	PF	PA	STK
y-Northern Kentucky River Monsters (Note: Although Northern Kentucky were awarded the season title, they entered the postseason as the 4 seed due to salary cap violations.)	11	3	0	.786	569	417	L1
x-Saginaw Sting	10	4	0	.714	473	415	L2
x-Eastern Kentucky Drillers	8	6	0	.571	390	373	W1
x-Huntington Hammer	7	7	0	.500	377	328	W2
Johnstown Generals	6	8	0	.429	292	416	W2
Canton Cougars	1	13	0	.071	370	522	L10

== Final roster ==
2011 Huntington Hammer roster
Quarterbacks: 10 Darwin Pittman; 1 Martevious Young; Running backs: 20 Dray Mason; Wide receivers: 15 Adrian Adams; 80 Kenny Davis; 80 Hiram Moore; 3 Jeff Phillips; 88 Thomas Riley	Offensive linemen: 96 Casey Oxley; 55 Aric Payne; 50 Eric Vint; Defensive linemen: 8 Rodney Fritz; 98 Chris Foster; 6 Joshua Kaltsas; 60 Chris Payne; 13 Michael Robinson	Linebackers: 9 Andre Portis; Defensive backs: 2 Jason Allen; 7 Darius Pettigrew; 4 Jarett Sanderson; 25 Ryan Williams-Dancy; Kickers: Currently vacant	Injured reserve: Currently vacant; Inactive: 5 Kevin Allen Jr. DB; -- Rob Avriett K; -- Cedeno Patrick DB; -- Cory Cole OL/DL; -- Kenny Davis WR; -- Wes Sherrill K; 81 Victor Smith WR; Practice squad: Currently vacant; Rookies in italics Roster updated June 4, 2011; 21 Active, 7 Inactive, 0 PS
