= 2011 Canton Cougars season =

- Owner: Michael Taylor; Andrew Haines
- Head coach: Rashan Hall (fired on May 23, 2011: 1-12 record); Paul Farrah (interim)
- Home stadium: Canton Memorial Civic Center; 1101 Market Avenue North; Canton, OH 44702

Results
- Record: 1-13
- League place: 6th
- Playoffs: did not qualify

The 2011 Canton Cougars season was the 1st and only season for the Ultimate Indoor Football League (UIFL) franchise. The Cougars were formed by the head of the Ultimate Indoor Football League, Andrew Haines. Haines made the hire of Rashan Hall to become the Cougars first ever head coach. The Cougars played their first ever game on February 20, 2011 against the Huntington Hammer, a game in which the Cougars lost 41-26. With the team getting off to a rough 0-3 start, Haines issued a guarantee to the people of Canton, saying that the revamped Cougars roster would defeat the Saginaw Sting during their week 4 meeting. The Cougars didn't make their owner a liar, defeating the Sting 53-52. Their victory over the Sting proved to be the lone bright spot for the Cougars, who would lose 9 straight before firing Hall, and replacing him with Paul Farrah. Farrah would lose the game, with less than a week to prepare. The Cougars finished with a 1-13 record, and finished last in the UIFL.

On June 16, 2011, it was announced that Michael Taylor and Andrew Hines had sold their controlling state in the Cougars to Tim Clark. Clark was the former owner of the Johnstown Generals, but the commute was becoming a hassle. Once he gained ownership, he made several personnel changes including, naming Paul Farrah as its new head coach. Farrah was recently hired as the director of football operations. He also hired Canton South High School head coach Mo Daniska as the new defensive coordinator, while Louisville High School defensive coordinator Troy Davis will serve as the director of community relations, focusing on developing youth football camps and clinics. Former Head Coach Rashaun Hall has been retained as an assistant coach and will also serve as director of player personnel. The new group made plenty of signings for the 2012 season, and lasted until January when the franchise suspended operations.

== Schedule ==
Key: Win Tie Loss Bye

=== Regular season ===
All start times are local to home team

Week	Day	Date	Opponent	Results		Location
Week	Day	Date	Opponent	Score	Record	Location
1	Sunday	February 20	at Huntington Hammer	L 26-41	0-1	Big Sandy Superstore Arena
2	Friday	February 25	Northern Kentucky River Monsters	L 41-63	0-2	Canton Memorial Civic Center
3	BYE					
4	Saturday	March 12	at Johnstown Generals	L 19-41	0-3	Cambria County War Memorial Arena
5	Monday	March 21	Saginaw Sting	W 53-52	1-3	Canton Memorial Civic Center
6	Monday	March 28	at Northern Kentucky River Monsters	L 53-62	1-4	The Bank of Kentucky Center
7	Sunday	April 3	at Eastern Kentucky Drillers	L 29-56	1-5	Eastern Kentucky Expo Center
8	Saturday	April 9	Northern Kentucky River Monsters	L 55-78	1-6	Canton Memorial Civic Center
9	Friday	April 15	at Saginaw Sting	L 61-62	1-7	Dow Event Center
10	Saturday	April 23	Huntington Hammer	L 33-67	1-8	Canton Memorial Civic Center
11	Saturday	April 30	at Eastern Kentucky Drillers	L 0-45	1-9	Eastern Kentucky Expo Center
12	Sunday	May 8	Eastern Kentucky Drillers	L 26-38	1-10	Canton Memorial Civic Center
13	Saturday	May 14	Saginaw Sting	L 47-76	1-11	Canton Memorial Civic Center
14	Saturday	May 21	at Huntington Hammer	L 36-56	1-12	Big Sandy Superstore Arena
15	Saturday	May 28	Johnstown Generals	L 12-45	1-13	Canton Memorial Civic Center

=== Standings ===
2011 UIFL standings (Note: http://www.theuifl.com/01/UIFLStats/confsked.htm)
Team	W	L	T	PCT	PF	PA	STK
y-Northern Kentucky River Monsters (Note: Although Northern Kentucky were awarded the season title, they entered the postseason as the 4 seed due to salary cap violations.)	11	3	0	.786	569	417	L1
x-Saginaw Sting	10	4	0	.714	473	415	L2
x-Eastern Kentucky Drillers	8	6	0	.571	390	373	W1
x-Huntington Hammer	7	7	0	.500	377	328	W2
Johnstown Generals	6	8	0	.429	292	416	W2
Canton Cougars	1	13	0	.071	370	522	L10

== Final roster ==
Canton Cougars roster
Quarterbacks: 6 Ray Marrow; -- Marc Pullen; Running backs: 43 Daniel Suitca; Wide receivers: 3 Ryan Brinson; -- Nate Ford; -- Chris Kolokithas; 7 Tim Smith	Offensive linemen: -- Zack Anderson; 73 Donald Foster; 74 Chris Saunders; 55 Luke Summers; Defensive linemen: -- Anton Ceasar; 93 Jerome Jackson; 56 Harrison Jones; 98 Antonio Reynolds; 20 Dawon Smith	Linebackers: 22 Cody Smith; 42 Lawrence Vickerstaff; Defensive backs: 15 John Chisolm; 24 Pat O'Malley; 9 JoJo Polk; 33 Dawon Woodward; Kickers: -- Jared Thomas	Injured reserve: currently vacant; Exempt list: 14 Seth Burkholder K (Exempt); Practice squad: currently vacant; rookies in italics Roster updated March 28, 2011; 23 Active, 0 Inactive, 0 PS
