= 2011 Saginaw Sting season =

- Owner: Mike Esposito
- General manager: Stuart Schweigert
- Head coach: John Mize (fired on March 17, 2011: 2-1 record); Vince Leveille (interim)
- Home stadium: Dow Event Center; 303 Johnson Street; Saginaw, MI 48607

Results
- Record: 10-4
- League place: 2nd
- Playoffs: Won Semifinals 48-47 (River Monsters); Won Ultimate Bowl I 86-69 (Drillers)

The 2011 Saginaw Sting season was the 3rd season for the Ultimate Indoor Football League (UIFL) franchise. After not faring well during their only season in the IFL, the Sting For the 2011 season, the team was purchased by San Diego–based business man, Mike Esposito. Esposito announced that the team would play in the newly formed Ultimate Indoor Football League, which Esposito was also the league's commissioner. He hired Stuart Schweigert as the Sting's Director of Player Development. After a 2-1 start, John Mize was fired for failing to submit a game roster before the Wednesday night deadline, causing the Sting to play a game short handed, that they eventually lost 37-38. He was replaced by assistant coach Vince Leveille. The Sting went on to win the Ultimate Bowl, with quarterback Tommy Jones setting several UIFL passing records and claiming the Ultimate Bowl's MVP honors. Ultimate Indoor Football League franchise. The Sting were able to finish the season with a 10-4 record, and won the Ultimate Bowl over the Eastern Kentucky Drillers.

== Schedule ==
Key: Win Tie Loss Bye

=== Regular season ===
Week	Day	Date	Opponent	Results		Location
Week	Day	Date	Opponent	Score	Record	Location
1	Friday	February 18	Eastern Kentucky Drillers	W 49-46	1-0	Dow Event Center
2	Friday	February 25	Johnstown Generals	W 62-49	2-0	Dow Event Center
3	BYE					
4	Sunday	March 13	Huntington Hammer	L 37-38	2-1	Dow Event Center
5	Monday	March 21	at Canton Cougars	L 52-53	2-2	Canton Memorial Civic Center
6	Friday	March 25	Eastern Kentucky Drillers	W 76-41	3-2	Dow Event Center
7	Friday	April 1	at Johnstown Generals	W 33-29	4-2	Cambria County War Memorial Arena
8	Saturday	April 9	at Huntington Hammer	W 49-42	5-2	Big Sandy Superstore Arena
9	Friday	April 15	Canton Cougars	W 62-61	6-2	Dow Event Center
10	Friday	April 22	at Northern Kentucky River Monsters	L 56-64	6-3	The Bank of Kentucky Center
11	Friday	April 29	Johnstown Generals	W 55-37	7-3	Dow Event Center
12	Sunday	May 8	Northern Kentucky River Monsters	W 63-58	8-3	Dow Event Center
13	Saturday	May 14	at Canton Cougars	W 76-47	9-3	Canton Memorial Civic Center
14	Saturday	May 21	at Johnstown Generals	W 58-20	10-3	Cambria County War Memorial Arena
15	Sunday	May 29	at Huntington Hammer	L 43-44	10-4	Big Sandy Superstore Arena

=== Postseason schedule ===
Round	Day	Date	Opponent	Results		Location
Round	Day	Date	Opponent	Score	Record	Location
Semifinals	Saturday	June 4	Northern Kentucky River Monsters	W 48-47	1-0	Dow Event Center
Ultimate Bowl I	Friday	June 10	Eastern Kentucky Drillers	W 86-69	2-0	Dow Event Center

== Standings ==
2011 UIFL standings (Note: http://www.theuifl.com/01/UIFLStats/confsked.htm)
Team	W	L	T	PCT	PF	PA	STK
y-Northern Kentucky River Monsters (Note: Although Northern Kentucky were awarded the season title, they entered the postseason as the 4 seed due to salary cap violations.)	11	3	0	.786	569	417	L1
x-Saginaw Sting	10	4	0	.714	473	415	L2
x-Eastern Kentucky Drillers	8	6	0	.571	390	373	W1
x-Huntington Hammer	7	7	0	.500	377	328	W2
Johnstown Generals	6	8	0	.429	292	416	W2
Canton Cougars	1	13	0	.071	370	522	L10

== Final roster ==
2011 Saginaw Sting roster
Quarterbacks: 4 Tommy Jones; Running backs: 1 Robert Haynes; Wide receivers: 3 LaVaughn Macon; 5 Chuck Dowdell QB/WR; 8 Yvens Lewis; 9 Kevin Brown; 15 Zac Nichols	Offensive linemen: 66 Josh Pack; 76 Eric Brim; 77 Steve Milalak; Defensive linemen: 11 Mike McFadden; 44 Mike McGowan; 55 Vernon Burden; 96 Shawn Horetski; 99 Michael Carter	Linebackers: 7 John Jacobs; 12 James Herring; 25 Philip Smith; 44 Michael Mcfadden; Defensive backs: 2 Tony Norman; 6 Jaa Valentine; 10 Ed Loscalzo; 13 Calvin Brown; Kickers: 14 Chris Kolias	Injured reserve: Currently vacant; Exempt list: Currently vacant; Practice squad: Currently vacant; Rookies in italics updated March 29, 2011; 25 Active, 0 Inactive, 0 PS

== Coaching staff ==
- Head coach – Vince Leveille, Michigan Tech
- Tommy Jones – Offensive coordinator, Indiana University
- Paul Mattey – Offensive and defensive line, Quincy University
- Terry Foster – Defensive coordinator – Michigan Tech
- Fred Townsend – Assistant coach, Central Michigan University
- Billy Maxy – Assistant coach, Saginaw
- Caroline Kinsey – Legal counsel, Michigan State University
