= 2011 Eastern Kentucky Drillers season =

- Owner: Rick Kranz
- Head coach: Lance Brown
- Home stadium: Eastern Kentucky Expo Center; 126 Main Street; Pikeville, KY 41501

Results
- Record: 8–6
- Division place: 3rd
- Playoffs: Won Semifinals 20–4 (Hammer); Lost Ultimate Bowl I 69–86 (Sting)

The 2011 Eastern Kentucky Drillers season was the 1st season for the Ultimate Indoor Football League (UIFL) franchise. On November 26, 2010, the UIFL announced that the team in Pikeville, Kentucky would be named the Eastern Kentucky Drillers. The Drillers lost their first game in franchise history, a 44–49 defeat to the hands of the Saginaw Sting. Even in the defeat, two Drillers (Aric Evans and David Jones), won the first ever Offensive Player of the Week and Special Teams Player of the Week Awards in the history of the Ultimate Indoor Football League. The following week, the Drillers played their first ever home game at Eastern Kentucky Expo Center, and in front of 3,500 fans, the Drillers won 37–26 over the Huntington Hammer. The Drillers were able to finish the season with an 8–6 record. In the playoffs, they defeated the Huntington Hammer, and advanced to Ultimate Bowl I, where they lost to the Saginaw Sting.

== Schedule ==
Key: Win Tie Loss Bye

=== Regular season ===
Week	Day	Date	Opponent	Results		Location
Week	Day	Date	Opponent	Score	Record	Location
1	Friday	February 18	at Saginaw Sting	L 46–49	0–1	Dow Event Center
2	Friday	February 25	Huntington Hammer	W 37–26	1–1	Eastern Kentucky Expo Center
3	BYE					
4	Saturday	March 12	Northern Kentucky River Monsters	W 60–33	2–1	Eastern Kentucky Expo Center
5	Friday	March 18	at Huntington Hammer	L 28–39	2–2	Big Sandy Superstore Arena
6	Friday	March 25	at Saginaw Sting	L 41–76	2–3	Dow Event Center
7	Sunday	April 3	Canton Cougars	W 56–29	3–3	Eastern Kentucky Expo Center
8	Saturday	April 9	Johnstown Generals	W 43–21	4–3	Eastern Kentucky Expo Center
9	Saturday	April 16	at Northern Kentucky River Monsters	L 42–59	4–4	The Bank of Kentucky Center
10	Friday	April 22	at Johnstown Generals	L 37–41	4–5	Cambria County War Memorial Arena
11	Saturday	April 30	Canton Cougars	W 45–0	5–5	Eastern Kentucky Expo Center
12	Sunday	May 8	at Canton Cougars	W 38–26	6–5	Canton Memorial Civic Center
13	Sunday	May 15	Johnstown Generals	W 35–22	7–5	Eastern Kentucky Expo Center
14	Saturday	May 21	at Northern Kentucky River Monsters	L 40–54	7–6	The Bank of Kentucky Center
15	Saturday	May 28	Northern Kentucky River Monsters	W 44–43	8–6	Eastern Kentucky Expo Center

=== Postseason schedule ===
Round	Day	Date	Opponent	Results		Location
Round	Day	Date	Opponent	Score	Record	Location
Semifinals	Saturday	June 4	Huntington Hammer	W 20–4	1–0	Eastern Kentucky Expo Center
Ultimate Bowl I	Friday	June 10	at Saginaw Sting	L 69–86	1–1	Dow Event Center

== Standings ==
2011 UIFL standings (Note: http://www.theuifl.com/01/UIFLStats/confsked.htm)
Team	W	L	T	PCT	PF	PA	STK
y-Northern Kentucky River Monsters (Note: Although Northern Kentucky were awarded the season title, they entered the postseason as the 4 seed due to salary cap violations.)	11	3	0	.786	569	417	L1
x-Saginaw Sting	10	4	0	.714	473	415	L2
x-Eastern Kentucky Drillers	8	6	0	.571	390	373	W1
x-Huntington Hammer	7	7	0	.500	377	328	W2
Johnstown Generals	6	8	0	.429	292	416	W2
Canton Cougars	1	13	0	.071	370	522	L10

== Roster ==
2011 Eastern Kentucky Drillers roster
Quarterbacks: 6 Daniel Eidson; 2 Allan Holland; Running backs: currently vacant; Wide receivers: 9 E. J. Adams WR/DB; 8 Drew Anthony; 80 Matthew Barbour; 11 Aric Evans; 88 Justin Lamb	Offensive linemen: 55 Phil Blaising; 79 Jack Breckner; 60 James Jenkins; 90 Rashaud Mungro; 67 Joe Parker; Defensive linemen: 91 Robert Brown; 44 Rodrick Davis; 32 Shawn Lewis	Linebackers: 85 Zane Cooper; 20 Shaun Jones; Defensive backs: 1 Troy Cloud; 21 Jason Conner; 7 David Jones; 19 Juan Ramirez; 4 Jamell Ringo; 3 Rakiem Rowland; Kickers: 55 Brandon Miller	Injured reserve: currently vacant; Exempt list: currently vacant; Practice squad: currently vacant; rookies in italics updated March 28, 2011; 23 Active, 0 Inactive, 0 PS

== Box scores ==
=== Week 1: Eastern Kentucky Drillers vs. Saginaw Sting ===
Week 1: Eastern Kentucky Drillers at Saginaw Sting – Game summary

Quarter	1	2	3	4	Total
Drillers	20	6	13	7	46
Sting	14	13	6	16	49

at Dow Event Center, Saginaw, Michigan

- Date: Feb. 18, 2011
- Game time: 7:30 p.m. EDT
- Game attendance: 3,164

Game information

1st quarter

2nd quarter

3rd quarter

4th quarter

Passing

- Eastern Kentucky– Allan Holland: 22/30, 178 yards, 4 TD
- Saginaw – Tommy Jones: 41/50, 278 yards, 5 TD

Rushing

- Eastern kentucky – Daniel Eidson: 3 att, 7 yards, 0 TD
- Saginaw – Tommy Jones: 2 att, 20 yards, 0 TD

Receiving

- Eastern kentucky – Aric Evans: 11 rec, 85 yards, 5 TD
- Saginaw – Charles Dowdell: 12 rec, 81 yards, 2 TD
