= 2011 Northern Kentucky River Monsters season =

Indoor football season

- Owner: Jill Chitwood
- Head coach: Rodney Swinigan
- Home stadium: The Bank of Kentucky Center; 500 Nunn Drive; Highland Heights, KY 41099

Results
- Record: 11–3
- League place: 1st
- Playoffs: Lost Semifinals 37–38 (Sting)

The 2011 Northern Kentucky River Monsters season was the first season for the Ultimate Indoor Football League (UIFL) franchise. Announced as a startup team for the newly formed Ultimate Indoor Football League in 2010, the team was purchased by Jill Chitwood from the UIFL in February 2011. Just a week before the season began, team General Manager, Jared Lorenzen, relieved himself of his duties as general manager, and became the quarterback for the franchise. In the River Monsters first ever game they defeated the Canton Cougars by a score of 63–41. With a Week 9 win over the Saginaw Sting, the River Monsters had clinched a postseason berth in their first season, clinching home field advantage throughout the playoffs. After wrapping up the season, the UIFL had discovered that the River Monsters had been paying their players over the league's salary cap. The UIFL stripped the River Monsters of the #1 seed and made them the #4 seed, taking away the River Monster's chance to earn playoff money. The River Monster now traveled to Saginaw, Michigan to play the Sting, where the Sting upset the River Monsters 48–47. On June 6, 2011, it was announced that the UIFL and the River Monsters mutually agreed to part ways, leaving the team free to join another league. However, the UIFL had a lease agreement with the arena, which hampered the likelihood the River Monsters would play in Highland Heights in 2012. The team had been mentioned as a charter member Stadius Football Association, but that league never got off the ground.

== Offseason ==
=== 2011 draft board ===
Round	Selection	Player	Position
1	3	Sly Brumfield	WR/DB
2	9	George Frisch	OL
3	15	Jon D'Angelo	LB
4	21	Greg Johnston	DB

== Schedule ==
Key: Win Tie Loss Bye

=== Regular season ===
Week	Day	Date	Opponent	Results		Location
Week	Day	Date	Opponent	Score	Record	Location
1	BYE					
2	Friday	February 25	at Canton Cougars	W 63–41	1–0	Canton Memorial Civic Center
3	Saturday	March 5	at Johnstown Generals	W 62–49	2–0	Cambria County War Memorial Arena
4	Saturday	March 12	at Eastern Kentucky Drillers	L 33–60	2–1	Eastern Kentucky Expo Center
5	Friday	March 18	Johnstown Generals	W 79–21	3–1	The Bank of Kentucky Center
6	Monday	March 28	Canton Cougars	W 62–53	4–1	The Bank of Kentucky Center
7	Friday	April 1	Huntington Hammer	W 69–40	5–1	The Bank of Kentucky Center
8	Saturday	April 9	at Canton Cougars	W 78–55	6–1	Canton Memorial Civic Center
9	Saturday	April 16	Eastern Kentucky Drillers	W 59–42	7–1	The Bank of Kentucky Center
10	Friday	April 22	Saginaw Sting	W 64–56	8–1	The Bank of Kentucky Center
11	Saturday	April 30	at Huntington Hammer	W 44–23	9–1	Big Sandy Superstore Arena
12	Sunday	May 8	at Saginaw Sting	L 58–63	9–2	Dow Event Center
13	Saturday	May 14	Huntington Hammer	W 34–28	10–2	The Bank of Kentucky Center
14	Saturday	May 21	Eastern Kentucky Drillers	W 54–40	11–2	The Bank of Kentucky Center
15	Saturday	May 28	at Eastern Kentucky Drillers	L 43–44	11–3	Eastern Kentucky Expo Center

=== Postseason schedule ===
Round	Day	Date	Opponent	Results		Location
Round	Day	Date	Opponent	Score	Record	Location
Semifinals	Saturday	June 4	at Saginaw Sting	L 47–48	0–1	Dow Event Center

== Standings ==
2011 UIFL standings (Note: http://www.theuifl.com/01/UIFLStats/confsked.htm)
Team	W	L	T	PCT	PF	PA	STK
y-Northern Kentucky River Monsters (Note: Although Northern Kentucky were awarded the season title, they entered the postseason as the 4 seed due to salary cap violations.)	11	3	0	.786	569	417	L1
x-Saginaw Sting	10	4	0	.714	473	415	L2
x-Eastern Kentucky Drillers	8	6	0	.571	390	373	W1
x-Huntington Hammer	7	7	0	.500	377	328	W2
Johnstown Generals	6	8	0	.429	292	416	W2
Canton Cougars	1	13	0	.071	370	522	L10

== Final roster ==
2011 Northern Kentucky River Monsters roster
Quarterbacks: 22 Jared Lorenzen; Running backs: 6 Maurice Douse; Wide receivers: 84 A. J. Allen; 88 Antonie Bagwell; 8 Willie Idlette; 3 Ricardo Lenhart; 5 Harry Lewis	Offensive linemen: 63 Khalil El-Amin; 72 George Frisch; 77 Matt Rahn; Defensive linemen: 50 Darrell Brown; 92 Curtis McGhee; 52 Thomas McKenzie; 99 Luke Scarborough	Linebackers: 7 Jon D'Angelo; 95 Wallace Morris; 51 Santino Turnbow; Defensive backs: 12 Butch Abshire; 16 Austin Goss; 10 Brett Hamblen; 21 Kenneth Joshen; 2 Tez Morris; 24 Jermaine Woods; Kickers: 28 Dustin Zink	Injured reserve: Currently vacant; Exempt list: Currently vacant; Practice squad: Currently vacant; Rookies in italics Roster updated March 29, 2011; 24 Active, 0 Inactive, 0 PS
