= 2011 Johnstown Generals season =

- Owner: Tim Clark; Ahmed Pruitt
- Head coach: Quenteen Robinson
- Home stadium: Cambria County War Memorial Arena; 326 Napoleon Street; Johnstown, PA 15901

Results
- Record: 6-8
- League place: 5th
- Playoffs: Did not qualify

The 2011 Johnstown Generals season was the first season for the Ultimate Indoor Football League (UIFL) franchise. The Generals were able to finish the season with a 6-8 record, and failed to qualify for the playoffs.

The Generals season began with the first overall pick in the 2011 UIFL Draft. The Generals selected Victor Seasy with that pick.

== Schedule ==
Key: Win Tie Loss Bye

=== Regular season ===
Week	Day	Date	Opponent	Results		Location
Week	Day	Date	Opponent	Score	Record	Location
1	BYE					
2	Friday	February 25	at Saginaw Sting	L 41-59	0-1	Dow Event Center
3	Saturday	March 5	Northern Kentucky River Monsters	L 49-62	0-2	Cambria County War Memorial Arena
4	Saturday	March 12	Canton Cougars	W 41-19	1-2	Cambria County War Memorial Arena
5	Friday	March 18	at Northern Kentucky River Monsters	L 79-21	1-3	The Bank of Kentucky Center
6	Friday	March 25	at Huntington Hammer	L 16-52	1-4	Big Sandy Superstore Arena
7	Friday	April 1	Saginaw Sting	L 29-33	1-5	Cambria County War Memorial Arena
8	Saturday	April 9	at Eastern Kentucky Drillers	L 21-43	1-6	Eastern Kentucky Expo Center
9	Sunday	April 17	Huntington Hammer	W 33-32	2-6	Cambria County War Memorial Arena
10	Friday	April 22	Eastern Kentucky Drillers	W 41-37	3-6	Cambria County War Memorial Arena
11	Friday	April 29	at Saginaw Sting	L 37-55	3-7	Dow Event Center
12	Friday	May 6	Huntington Hammer	W 41-15	4-7	Cambria County War Memorial Arena
13	Sunday	May 15	at Eastern Kentucky Drillers	L 22-35	4-8	Eastern Kentucky Expo Center
14	Saturday	May 21	Saginaw Sting	W 58-20	5-8	Cambria County War Memorial Arena
15	Saturday	May 28	at Canton Cougars	W 45-12	6-8	Canton Memorial Civic Center

== Standings ==
2011 UIFL standings (Note: http://www.theuifl.com/01/UIFLStats/confsked.htm)
Team	W	L	T	PCT	PF	PA	STK
y-Northern Kentucky River Monsters (Note: Although Northern Kentucky were awarded the season title, they entered the postseason as the 4 seed due to salary cap violations.)	11	3	0	.786	569	417	L1
x-Saginaw Sting	10	4	0	.714	473	415	L2
x-Eastern Kentucky Drillers	8	6	0	.571	390	373	W1
x-Huntington Hammer	7	7	0	.500	377	328	W2
Johnstown Generals	6	8	0	.429	292	416	W2
Canton Cougars	1	13	0	.071	370	522	L10

== Final roster ==
2011 Johnstown Generals roster
Quarterbacks: 10 David Dinkins; 12 Jeff Slatcoff; -- Tavares Woodley; Running backs: 44 Jimmy Myers; Wide receivers: 84 A. J. Allen; 88 Antonie Bagwell; 25 Stephen Slatcoff; 82 Calvin Stephens; 13 Xavier Thomas	Offensive linemen: 75 Samuel Barber; 78 Will Haase; 65 Vincent Palmiere; 72 Lamont Stephens; Defensive linemen: 96 Shea McKeen; 99 Victor Sesay	Linebackers: 32 Terrell Simms; Defensive backs: 45 Dionte Henry; 2 Terrence Hudson; 33 Aaron Princes; 20 Joshua Simmons; 35 DeQwan Young; Kickers: 7 Jason Cherry	Injured reserve: 95 Ti-Mirr Horton (IR); 92 Mike Marshall (IR); 50 Mark Tsinger (IR); Exempt list: Currently vacant; Practice squad: Currently vacant; Rookies in italics Roster updated March 29, 2011; 23 Active, 3 Inactive, 0 PS
