= Maurice Williams (wide receiver) =

American football player (born 1987)

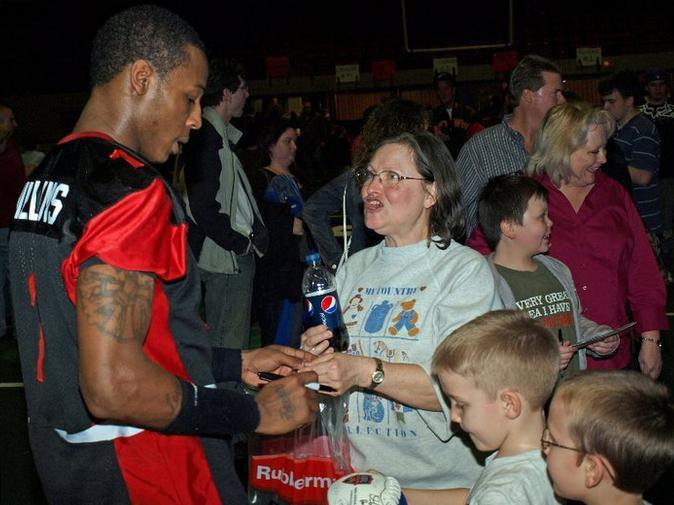

No. 15 – Jacksonville Sharks
- Position: Wide receiver
- Roster status: Active

Personal information
- Born: November 7, 1987 (age 38); Erie, Pennsylvania, U.S.
- Listed height: 6 ft 2 in (1.88 m)
- Listed weight: 195 lb (88 kg)

Career information
- High school: Erie (PA) Strong Vincent
- College: Pittsburgh
- NFL draft: 2011: undrafted

Career history
- Canton Cougars (2011); Erie Explosion (2011); Cleveland Gladiators (2012–2013); Orlando Predators (2013); Indianapolis Colts (2013)*; Los Angeles Kiss (2014); Jacksonville Sharks (2014); Las Vegas Outlaws (2015)*; Erie Explosion (2015); Portland Thunder/Steel (2015–2016); Jacksonville Sharks (2017–present)
- * Offseason or practice squad member only

Awards and highlights
- NAL champion (2017); Second Team All-NAL (2017)

Career AFL statistics
- Receptions: 83
- Receiving yards: 1,097
- Receiving touchdowns: 21
- Interceptions: 4
- Return touchdowns: 2
- Stats at ArenaFan.com

Maurice "Moe" Anthony Sherrod Williams (born November 7, 1987) is an American professional football wide receiver for the Jacksonville Sharks of the National Arena League (NAL).

== Early life ==
Born the son of Monica Jones, Maurice was one of the most highly touted recruits coming out of Pennsylvania in the 2007 Recruiting Class. Maurice was a Four Star recruit by Scout.com and was ranked as high as the #13 WR in the Nation, even though he was a Quarterback at Erie, PA Strong Vincent High School where he was a Class AAA All-State Defensive Back and an All-Region QB for the Colonels. He earned Local, Regional, and National attention, being named to the SuperPrep All-American Team, and was selected to play in the Pennsylvania Football Coaches Association East-West All-Star Game. He was among those selected in the ESPN150 and Scout Hot 100. Lettered all four years in Football, Basketball, and Track & Field while at Strong Vincent.

== College career ==
Picked to attend the University of Pittsburgh over West Virginia and Iowa for the 2007 NCAA Football Season to play for the Panthers. Williams played one season for the Panthers as a True Freshman. After being Panthers top Wide Receiver in three spring scrimmages and the Annual Blue-Gold Game, Williams was declared Academically Ineligible. Early reports said Williams was set to take a Red-Shirt year, but he transferred to Edinboro University of Pennsylvania. He never became eligible to play at Edinboro.

== Professional career ==
=== Canton Cougars ===
On March 24, 2011, almost four years since Williams last played organized football, Maurice signed with the Canton Cougars of the Ultimate Indoor Football League (UIFL). In seven games for the Cougars, Williams scored 17 Touchdowns on 34 Receptions.

=== Cleveland Gladiators ===
On October 28, 2011, Williams signed with the Cleveland Gladiators of the Arena Football League (AFL) for the 2012 season. Maurice earned the Week 16 Spalding Highlight of the Week for his 53-yard kick return touchdown versus the Jacksonville Sharks.

=== Orlando Predators ===
On May 5, 2013, Williams was acquired by the Orlando Predators after spending the earlier part of the season with the Cleveland Gladiators. On his first two touches as a Predator, Williams scored on a 56-yard kick return and a 41-yard reception.

=== Indianapolis Colts ===
On August 20, 2013, Williams signed with the Indianapolis Colts. On August 25, Williams was waived by the Colts with an injury settlement.

=== Los Angeles Kiss ===
On May 8, 2014, Williams was assigned to the Los Angeles Kiss. He scored three touchdowns in his first start with the Kiss.

=== Jacksonville Sharks ===
On June 2, 2014, Williams was traded to the Jacksonville Sharks

=== Las Vegas Outlaws ===
On December 22, 2014, Williams was selected by the Las Vegas Outlaws in the 2014 Expansion Draft.

=== Return to Erie ===
On April 15, 2015, Williams signed with the Erie Explosion, who had moved to the Professional Indoor Football League.

=== Portland Thunder ===
On May 19, 2015, Williams was assigned to the Portland Thunder. On December 4, 2015, Williams was placed on league suspension.

=== Jacksonville Sharks ===
On February 6, 2017, Williams signed with the Jacksonville Sharks, who had moved to the National Arena League.
