= SMG (property management) =

Defunct property management group

- Formerly: Spectator Management Group
- Type: Private
- Founded: 1977; 49 years ago
- Defunct: 2019
- Fate: Merged into ASM Global
- Headquarters: West Conshohocken, Pennsylvania
- Owner: Onex Corporation (2017–2019)
- Website: www.smgworld.com

SMG, formerly Spectacor Management Group, was an American worldwide venue management group headquartered in West Conshohocken, Pennsylvania, that specialized in managing publicly owned facilities. It began their operation in 1977 with management of the Louisiana Superdome. It was one of the largest property management corporations in the world.

SMG was a joint venture in general partnership form with two equal principals, The Hyatt Hotel Company and Aramark Corporation. SMG was bought by American Capital in 2007 for US$631 million, and American Capital was sold to Ares Management in January 2017. Ares Management sold SMG to Onex Corporation in 2017. In October 2019, SMG and AEG Facilities merged to make a new company called ASM Global.

== Properties managed ==
=== Arenas ===
==== Canada ====
- Hershey Centre, Mississauga, Ontario
- Meridian Centre, St. Catharines, Ontario
- Canalta Centre, Medicine Hat, Alberta
- Avenir Centre, Moncton, New Brunswick

==== United Kingdom ====
- Odyssey Arena, Belfast
- Manchester Arena, Manchester
- Utilita Arena, Newcastle
- First Direct Arena, Leeds
- Baths Hall, Scunthorpe
- Connexin Live Arena, Hull
- P&J Live, Aberdeen

==== Germany ====
- König Pilsener Arena, Oberhausen

==== Norway ====
- Oslo Spektrum, Oslo

==== United Arab Emirates ====
- The Palladium, Dubai

==== Puerto Rico ====
- José Miguel Agrelot Coliseum, San Juan
- Puerto Rico Convention Center, San Juan

==== United States ====
California

- Citizens Business Bank Arena, Ontario, California
- Fresno Convention Center, Fresno, California
- Greek Theatre (Los Angeles), Los Angeles, California
- Long Beach Arena, Long Beach, California
- Rabobank Arena, Bakersfield, California
- Save Mart Center, Fresno, California
- Selland Arena, Fresno, California
- Moscone Convention Center, San Francisco, California
- Stockton Arena, Stockton, California

Southwest

- American Bank Center, Corpus Christi, Texas
- AT&T Center, San Antonio, Texas
- Ford Arena, Beaumont, Texas
- Laredo Entertainment Center, Laredo, Texas
- McLane Stadium, Waco, Texas
- NRG Arena, Houston, Texas
- BOK Center, Tulsa, Oklahoma
- Chesapeake Energy Arena, Oklahoma City

Midwest

- BMO Harris Bank Center, Rockford, Illinois
- Canton Memorial Civic Center, Canton, Ohio
- Peoria Civic Center, Peoria, Illinois
- Century Center, South Bend, Indiana
- Corbin Arena, Corbin, Kentucky
- The Pyramid, Memphis, Tennessee
- Dow Event Center, Saginaw, Michigan
- E.A. Diddle Arena, Bowling Green, Kentucky
- Eastern Kentucky Exposition Center, Pikeville, Kentucky
- Five Flags Center, Dubuque, Iowa
- Greater Columbus Convention Center, Columbus, Ohio
- Ford Idaho Center, Nampa, Idaho
- Intrust Bank Arena, Wichita, Kansas
- Landon Arena, Topeka, Kansas
- Mid-America Center, Council Bluffs, Iowa
- Sioux Falls Arena, Sioux Falls, South Dakota
- U.S. Bank Stadium, Minneapolis, Minnesota
- Van Andel Arena, Grand Rapids, Michigan
- Wintrust Arena, Chicago, Illinois
- Wolstein Center, Cleveland, Ohio

Northeast

- Cambria County War Memorial Arena, Johnstown, Pennsylvania
- DCU Center, Worcester, Massachusetts
- Dunkin' Donuts Center, Providence, Rhode Island
- Mohegan Sun Arena at Casey Plaza, Wilkes-Barre, Pennsylvania
- Petersen Events Center, Pittsburgh
- SNHU Arena, Manchester, New Hampshire
- Sovereign Center, Reading, Pennsylvania
- Times Union Center, Albany, New York

Southeast

- Infinite Energy Arena, Duluth, Georgia
- BB&T Center, Sunrise, Florida
- Big Sandy Superstore Arena, Huntington, West Virginia
- Cabarrus Arena, Concord, North Carolina
- CenturyLink Center, Bossier City, Louisiana
- Dean Smith Center, Chapel Hill, North Carolina
- Florence Civic Center, Florence, South Carolina
- John Paul Jones Arena, Charlottesville, Virginia
- North Charleston Coliseum, North Charleston, South Carolina
- VyStar Veterans Memorial Arena, Jacksonville, Florida
- Mobile Civic Center, Mobile, Alabama
- Pensacola Civic Center, Pensacola, Florida
- River Center Arena, Baton Rouge, Louisiana
- Richmond Coliseum, Richmond, Virginia
- Silver Spurs Arena, Kissimmee, Florida
- Smoothie King Center, New Orleans

Northwest

- Carlson Center, Fairbanks, Alaska
- Sullivan Arena, Anchorage, Alaska
- ShoWare Center, Kent, Washington

=== Convention centers ===
==== Canada ====
- Direct Energy Centre, Toronto

==== Mexico ====
- World Trade Center México, Mexico City

==== United States ====
- Albuquerque Convention Center Albuquerque, New Mexico
- American Bank Center, Corpus Christi, Texas
- Broward County Convention Center, Fort Lauderdale, Florida
- Cambria County War Memorial, Johnstown, Pennsylvania
- Charleston Area Convention Center, Charleston, South Carolina
- Charlotte Harbor Event and Conference Center, Punta Gorda, Florida
- Colorado Convention Center, Denver, Colorado
- Cox Business Services Center, Oklahoma City, Oklahoma
- David L. Lawrence Convention Center, Pittsburgh, Pennsylvania
- Dayton Airport Exposition Center, Vandalia, Ohio
- DeVos Place Convention Center Grand Rapids, Michigan
- Fresno Convention Center, Fresno, California
- Greater Columbus Convention Center, Columbus, Ohio
- Hampton Roads Convention Center, Hampton, Virginia
- Hawaii Convention Center, Honolulu, Hawaii
- Huntington Place, Detroit, Michigan
- Irving Convention Center, Irving, Texas
- Jekyll Island Convention Center, Jekyll Island, Georgia
- Judson F. Williams Convention Center, El Paso, Texas
- Kansas Expocentre, Topeka, Kansas
- Knoxville Convention Center, Knoxville, Tennessee
- Long Beach Convention Center, Long Beach, California
- Lynnwood Convention Center, Lynnwood, Washington
- McCormick Place, Chicago
- Meadowlands Exposition Center, Secaucus, New Jersey
- Memphis Cook Convention Center, Memphis, Tennessee
- Miami Beach Convention Center, Miami Beach, Florida
- Mobile Convention Center, Mobile, Alabama
- Moscone Center, San Francisco, California
- Mountain America Exposition Center, Sandy, Utah
- Nassau County Expo Center, Uniondale, New York
- NRG Center, Houston, Texas
- Old National Events Plaza, Evansville, Indiana
- Ontario Convention Center, Ontario, California
- Osceola Heritage Park, Kissimmee, Florida
- Palm Springs Convention Center, Palm Springs, California
- Palmetto Expo Center, Greenville, South Carolina
- Pennsylvania Convention Center, Philadelphia
- Peoria Civic Center, Peoria, Illinois
- Pontchartrain Center, Kenner, Louisiana
- Prime F. Osborn III Convention Center, Jacksonville, Florida
- Raising Cane's River Center, Baton Rouge, Louisiana
- Rhode Island Convention Center, Providence, Rhode Island
- Salt Palace Convention Center , Salt Lake City
- Savannah International Trade & Convention Center, Savannah, Georgia
- Shreveport Convention Center, Shreveport, Louisiana
- Valdez Hall, Fresno, California
- Wildwoods Convention Center, Wildwood, New Jersey
- William A. Egan Civic & Convention Center, Anchorage, Alaska

=== Stadiums ===
==== United States ====
- TIAA Bank Field, Jacksonville, Florida
- Banner Island Ballpark, Stockton, California
- Chase Field, Phoenix, Arizona
- State Farm Stadium, Glendale, Arizona
- Baseball Grounds of Jacksonville, Jacksonville, Florida
- Mercedes-Benz Superdome, New Orleans, Louisiana
- Astrodome, Houston, Texas
- NRG Stadium, Houston, Texas
- Soldier Field, Chicago
- Stadium, at Devon and Kedzie, Chicago
- U.S. Bank Stadium, Minneapolis, Minnesota

==== Poland ====
- Stadion Miejski, Wrocław

=== Theatres ===
==== United Kingdom ====
- Bridgewater Hall, Manchester
- Mill Volvo Tyne Theatre, Newcastle
- Playhouse, Whitley Bay

==== Germany ====
- Theatro Centro, Oberhausen

==== United States ====
- Abraham Chavez Theatre, El Paso, Texas
- Altria Theater, Richmond, Virginia
- Bob Hope Theatre, Stockton, California
- Cannon Center for the Performing Arts, Memphis, Tennessee
- Center Theatre, Long Beach, California
- Colorado Convention Center Theater, Denver, Colorado
- Dominion Energy Center, Richmond, Virginia
- Evansville Auditorium, Evansville, Indiana
- Fisher Theater, Ames, Iowa
- Genesee Theatre, Waukegan, Illinois
- Jackie Gleason Theater of the Performing Arts, Miami Beach, Florida
- Jacoby Symphony Hall (Jacksonville, Florida)
- Jefferson Performing Arts Center (Metairie, Louisiana)
- Kiva Auditorium, Albuquerque, New Mexico
- Moran Theater, Jacksonville, Florida
- Morris Jefferson, Sr. Municipal Auditorium, New Orleans, Louisiana
- National Theatre, Washington, D.C.
- North Charleston Performing Arts Center, North Charleston, South Carolina
- Orpheum Theater, Sioux Falls, South Dakota
- Plaza Theatre, El Paso, Texas
- River Center Theater for Performing Arts, Baton Rouge, Louisiana
- Saenger Theatre, Pensacola, Florida
- Saroyan Theatre, Fresno, California
- Selena Auditorium at the American Bank Center, Corpus Christi, Texas
- Sinatra Theatre, Sunrise, Florida
- Stephens Auditorium, Ames, Iowa
- Terrace Theater, Long Beach, California
- Terry Theater, Jacksonville, Florida
- Mahaffey Theater, St. Petersburg, Florida
- Times-Union Center for the Performing Arts, Jacksonville, Florida
- Victory Theatre, Evansville, Indiana
- William A. Egan Center Theater, Anchorage, Alaska

=== Other venues ===
==== Germany ====
- Loreley Amphitheatre, Sankt Goarshausen

==== United States ====
- Aquarium of the Pacific Long Beach, California
- Ben Boeke Ice Rink, Anchorage, Alaska
- Claremore Expocenter, Claremore, Oklahoma
- Greek Theatre, Los Angeles, California
- Koka Booth Amphitheatre, Cary, North Carolina
- Lamar-Dixon Expo Center, Gonzales, Louisiana
- McFetridge Sports Center, Chicago
- Mesker Amphitheatre, Evansville, Indiana
- Millennium Youth Entertainment Complex, Austin, Texas
- Navy Pier, Chicago
- Oak Park Ice Arena, Stockton, California
- Rye Airfield, Rye, New Hampshire
- Stockton Downtown Marina, Stockton, California
