= LaVaughn Macon =

American football player (born 1987)

No. 1
- Position: Wide receiver

Personal information
- Born: October 21, 1987 (age 39)
- Listed height: 5 ft 7 in (1.70 m)
- Listed weight: 170 lb (77 kg)

Career information
- College: New Mexico Highlands
- NFL draft: 2009: undrafted

Career history
- BC Lions (2009–2010)*; Saginaw Sting (2011); Wyoming Cavalry (2012); Bloomington Edge (2013); Utah Blaze (2013); Bloomington Edge (2014); Los Angeles KISS (2015)*; New Mexico Stars (2016)
- * Offseason or practice squad member only

Awards and highlights
- 2nd Team All-UIFL (2011); Ultimate Bowl I Champion (2011); Honorable Mention Special Teams Player of the Year (2013); 2nd Team All-CPIFL (2014)

Career AFL statistics
- Receptions: 7
- Yards: 145
- Touchdowns: 1
- Kickoff return yards: 243
- Kickoff return TDs: 1
- Stats at ArenaFan.com

LaVaughn Macon (born October 21, 1987) is an American former professional football wide receiver. Macon was signed by the BC Lions as an undrafted free agent in 2009. Macon completed his college career at New Mexico Highlands University.

== College career ==
=== Santa Monica College ===
After high school Macon attended Santa Monica College in Santa Monica, California, where he continued his football career. Macon played as a running back for the Corsairs.

=== New Mexico Highlands ===
After earning his degree from Santa Monica, Maco continued his football career at New Mexico Highlands University. In his junior year, Macon played in 9 games, rushing 22 times for 82-yards, while also catching 10 passes for 59-yards and one touchdown. Macon also returned a team high, 8 kickoffs for 198 yards. As a senior in 2008, Macon played in 10 games, rushing 8 times for 16-yards, while catching 29 passes for 309-yards and a touchdown. Macon also returned 16 kickoffs for 364-yards and 2 punts for 16-yards.

== Professional career ==
=== BC Lions ===
After graduation, Macon signed BC Lions of the Canadian Football League, where he spent two years as a practice squad member.

=== Saginaw Sting ===
In 2011, Macon signed with the Saginaw Sting of the Ultimate Indoor Football League. His 101 receptions for 1,184 yards and 32 touchdowns earned him a 2nd Team All-UIFL selection. The Sting earned the 2nd seed in the UIFL playoffs, and defeated the Eastern Kentucky Drillers in Ultimate Bowl I.

=== Wyoming Cavalry ===
In 2012, Macon played for the Wyoming Cavalry of the Indoor Football League. Macon posted 53 receptions for 573 yards and 10 touchdowns. Macon also had 28 kickoff returns for 408 yards and 1 touchdown.

=== Bloomington Edge ===
In 2013, Macon played for the Bloomington Edge of the Champions Professional Indoor Football League. Macon's return skills earned him honorable mention Special Teams Player of the Year.

=== Utah Blaze ===
Macon joined the Utah Blaze of the Arena Football League at the completion of the Edge season. Macon pulled in 7 passes for the Blaze during their final 3 games, but his special teams presence made his presence felt. In the Blaze's final game of the season, Macon had 186-yards on 6 kickoff returns, returning one kickoff 54-yards for a touchdown.

=== Los Angeles KISS ===
On March 18, 2015, Macon was assigned to the Los Angeles KISS. On March 20, 2015, Macon was placed on recallable reassignment.

=== New Mexico Stars ===
Macon signed with the New Mexico Stars for the 2016 season.
