= Thillens Stadium =

Baseball stadium in Lincolnwood, Illinois, US

Stadium at Devon and Kedzie
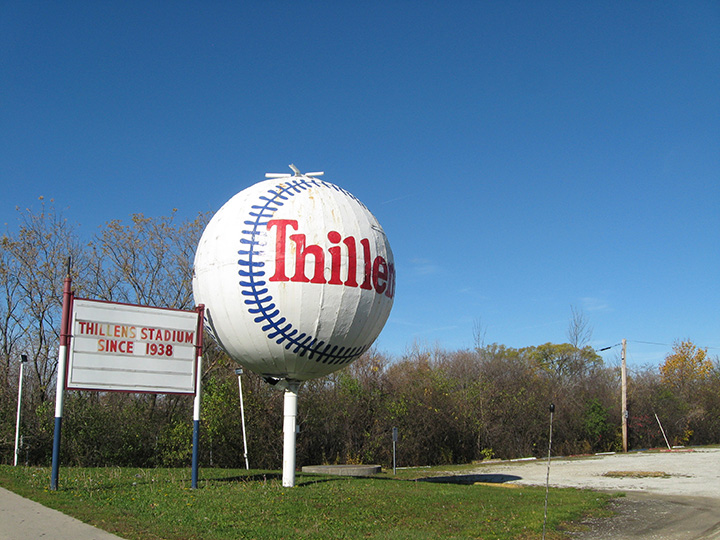
- The giant baseball formerly outside the stadium
- Interactive map of Stadium at Devon and Kedzie
- Former names: Thillens Stadium, North Town Stadium
- Location: 6404 N. Kedzie Ave; Lincolnwood, Illinois]] 60645
- Coordinates: 41.9987°N 87.7100°W
- Owner: Chicago Park District
- Operator: SMG
- Capacity: 2,400
- Surface: Grass

Construction
- Opened: 1938
- Renovated: 2005

The Stadium at Devon & Kedzie is a two-field baseball stadium in Chicago, Illinois. It has 2,400 seats and an average of 17,000 Chicago area children play there each year.

== Location ==
As indicated by its name, the Stadium at Devon & Kedzie is at the northwest corner of Devon and Kedzie on land now owned by the Chicago Park District.

== History ==
The stadium was founded in 1938 by Mel Thillens, Sr., owner of Thillens Inc. check-cashing business. Thillens' idea was to have a baseball park that anyone can use, rent-free. It cost Thillens a total of $6 million to build the park. In 1940 the ballpark erected lights for night use. In the 1940s, 1950s and 1960s both Little League games and men's 16-inch softball games were televised from the park by WGN-TV, with Jack Brickhouse announcing.

It was during a Little League telecast in the 1950s that the centerfield camera, now a staple of all baseball telecasts, was first used. According to Brickhouse, "One of our cameramen, Chuck Seatsema, told me that the center-field scoreboard was only a couple hundred feet away. He had a feeling that if he put a camera out there, we'd get a nice shot of the little catcher giving signs and the little batter's face over the pitcher's shoulder."

The centerfield scoreboard contained a picture of the Thillens armored truck. Starting in 1974, if any player hit the truck on the sign, they would win a $5,000 savings bond.

In 1993, Mel Thillens, Sr. died, but his family continued to operate the field and a non-profit charitable foundation supported it. Over time, the foundation could not afford expenses and, in March 2005, Thillens Stadium closed. The city of Chicago and the Chicago Cubs combined to invest $1.5 million in repairs and the stadium reopened its doors in June 2006. The park has since been renamed The Stadium at Devon and Kedzie.

An area landmark was the giant baseball with the name Thillens on a large pole in the front of the ballpark on Devon Avenue. The ball was moved from Boys World, a clothing store on Devon that closed in the 1950s. Originally, the ball spun on the pole.

Several years after the Chicago Park District took over the field the Thillens family requested that their family name be removed from the field. Mel Thillens, Jr. was quoted as saying the field was not being maintained and the Thillens family and business no longer wanted to be associated with it. The Chicago Park District claims to have maintained Thillens so it can "continue as a place of historical significance" that "thousands of children enjoy" each year. They obliged Mr. Thillens' request, removing the name from the field. At about the same time, the 60+ year-old giant baseball was removed, as it was deemed unsafe.

== Events ==
The annual Chicago Celebrity Softball games are hosted at Thillens Stadium. Those games have featured Michael Jordan, Chris Chelios, Minnie Miñoso, Rich Melman, Ferguson Jenkins, Randy Hundley, Billy Williams and Moose Skowron.

On July 28, 2009, the Chicago Bandits played the USSSA Pride in a National Pro Fastpitch women's softball game.
