= Stephen Fickert =

American football coach

Playing career
- 1968–1969: Miami (OH)
- 1970–1972: Butler

Coaching career (HC unless noted)
- 1973: Seeger HS (IN)
- 1974: Western Michigan (GA)
- 1975–1976: Wabash (DC)
- 1977: Albion (DC)
- 1978–1979: Maryville (TN)
- 1980: Wayne State (MI)
- 1981–1983: Western New Mexico
- 1985: Upper Iowa
- 1987–1989: Elmhurst HS (IN)
- 1995–1998: William Blount HS (TN)
- 1999: Seinäjoki Crocodiles
- 2000: Hannover Musketeers
- 2001: Tupelo Fire Ants
- 2002: Bakersfield Blitz (AHC)
- 2003: Peoria Pirates (OC)
- 2004: Grand Rapids Rampage (AHC)
- 2005: Quad City Steamwheelers (OL/DL)
- 2006: McPherson (OC/AHC)
- 2008–2009: Parker Lutheran HS (CO)
- 2012–2013: Briganti Napoli
- 2014–2015: Allgäu Comets (OC)

Administrative career (AD unless noted)
- 2011: Huntington Hammer (GM)

Head coaching record
- Overall: 31–33–2 (college); 32–57 (high school)

Accomplishments and honors

Championships
- 1 Finnish Maple League (1999)

Stephen Sutherland Fickert is an American football coach who has coached at the high school, college, indoor professional, and international levels.

== Playing career ==
A native of Indianapolis, Fickert began his college football career at Miami of Ohio where he played for head coaches Bo Schembechler and Bill Mallory. He transferred to Butler University where he lettered 3 times from 1970 and 1972 and was named first team all–ICC.

== Early coaching career ==
Fickert’s coaching career began at Seeger High School in West Lebanon, Indiana in 1973, finishing with a record of 1 win and 9 losses. He would then serve as a defensive coordinator at Wabash College for two years and for one year at Albion University where he was part of a very successful 1977 squad.

== College head coach ==
Fickert was the head coach at Maryville College in Maryville, Tennessee from 1978 to 1979. A one-year stint at Wayne State University in Detroit, Michigan ended in 1980 after Fickert resigned in protest over budget cuts He was the head coach of Brian VanGorder. He would later go on to be the head coach at Western New Mexico University in Silver City, New Mexico from 1981 to 1983.

In 1985, Fickert made the unorthodox move of taking out $1,500 in advertising space in the Chicago Sun-Times to recruit players Upper Iowa University in Fayette, Iowa where he was the coach for one year in 1985.

== High school, indoor, and international coaching ==
Fickert served as the head coach at Elmhurst High School in Fort Wayne, Indiana from 1987 to 1989, finishing 7–20, and William Blount High School in Maryville, Tennessee from 1995 to 1998, finishing 13–28.

In 1999, Fickert coach the Seinäjoki Crocodiles of Seinäjoki, Finland to a championship in the Finnish Maple League and followed that with a one-year stint as the head coach of the Hannover Musketeers of the German Football League. In 2001, Fickert was the head coach of the Tupelo Fire Ants of the National Indoor Football League, followed by stints as an assistant coach for the Bakersfield Blitz in 2002, Grand Rapids Rampage in 2004, and the Quad City Steamwheelers in 2005.

Fickert spent time as the offensive coordinator at McPherson College in McPherson, Kansas before coaching Parker Lutheran High School in Parker, Colorado to a 9–9 record from 2008 to 2009.

Fickert was the general manager of the Huntington Hammer in Huntington, West Virginia for the 2011 season. After that, he served as the head coach of the Briganti Napoli in the second division of the Italian Football League in 2013, and offensive coordinator of the Allgau Comets of the German Football League from 2014 to 2015.

== Head coaching record ==
=== College ===
Year	Team	Overall	Conference	Standing	Bowl/playoffs
Maryville Scots (NCAA Division III independent) (1978–1979)
1978	Maryville	8–1			
1979	Maryville	7–2			
Maryville:		15–3			
Wayne State Tartars (Great Lakes Intercollegiate Athletic Conference) (1980)
1980	Wayne State	5–4	3–3	4th	
Wayne State:		5–4	3–3		
Western New Mexico (Rocky Mountain Athletic Conference) (1981–1983)
1981	Western New Mexico	1–8	1–7	9th	
1982	Western New Mexico	4–5–1	2–5–1	6th	
1983	Western New Mexico	5–4–1	4–3–1	3rd	
Western New Mexico:		10–17–2	7–15–2		
Upper Iowa Peacocks (Iowa Intercollegiate Athletic Conference) (1985)
1985	Upper Iowa	1–9	1–6	8th	
Upper Iowa:		1–9	1–6		
Total:		31–33–2			
