= Canton Cougars =

American indoor football team based in Ohio

Logo

General information
- Founded: 2010
- Folded: 2012
- Headquartered: Canton, Ohio at the Canton Memorial Civic Center
- Colors: Black, Gold, Red
- Mascot: Cujo Da Cougar

Personnel
- Owner: Tim Clark
- General manager: Robb Bickis
- Head coach: Paul Farrah

Team history
- Canton Cougars (2011)

Home fields
- Canton Memorial Civic Center (2011)

League / conference affiliations
- Ultimate Indoor Football League (2011)

The Canton Cougars were a professional indoor football team based in Canton, Ohio. The team began play in 2011 as a charter member of the Ultimate Indoor Football League (UIFL) for its inaugural 2011 season. The Cougars played their home games at the Canton Memorial Civic Center. The Cougars were Canton's second indoor football team; their first since the American Indoor Football Association's Canton Legends, which played from 2005 until 2008 (winning the AIFL championship in 2006).

== History ==
=== 2011 ===
The Cougars were formed by the head of the Ultimate Indoor Football League, Andrew Haines. Haines made the hire of Rashan Hall to become the Cougars first ever head coach. The Cougars played their first ever game on February 20, 2011 against the Huntington Hammer, a game in which the Cougars lost 41-26. With the team getting off to a rough 0-3 start, Haines issued a guarantee to the people of Canton, saying that the revamped Cougars roster would defeat the Saginaw Sting during their week 4 meeting. The Cougars didn't make their owner a liar, defeating the Sting 53-52. Their victory over the Sting proved to be the lone bright spot for the Cougars, who would lose 9 straight before firing their Hall, and replacing him with Paul Farrah. Farrah would lose the game, with less than a week to prepare. The Cougars finished with a 1-13 record, and finished last in the UIFL.

=== 2012 ===
On June 16, 2011, it was announced that Michael Taylor and Andrew Hines had sold their controlling state in the Cougars to Tim Clark. Clark was the former owner of the Johnstown Generals, but the commute was becoming a hassle. Once he gained ownership, he made several personnel changes including, naming Paul Farrah as its new head coach. Farrah was recently hired as the director of football operations. He also hired Canton South High School head coach Mo Daniska as the new defensive coordinator, while Louisville High School defensive coordinator Troy Davis will serve as the director of community relations, focusing on developing youth football camps and clinics. Former head coach Rashaun Hall has been retained as an assistant coach and will also serve as director of player personnel. They also announced and hired seasoned operations executive David Lopez as the new director of sales and marketing. The new group made plenty of signings for the 2012 season, and lasted until January when the franchise suspended operations.

== Notable players ==
=== Final roster ===
Canton Cougars roster
Quarterbacks: 6 Ray Marrow; -- Marc Pullen; Running backs: 43 Daniel Suitca; Wide receivers: 3 Ryan Brinson; -- Nate Ford; -- Chris Kolokithas; 7 Tim Smith	Offensive linemen: -- Zack Anderson; 73 Donald Foster; 74 Chris Saunders; 55 Luke Summers; Defensive linemen: -- Anton Ceasar; 93 Jerome Jackson; 56 Harrison Jones; 98 Antonio Reynolds; 20 Dawon Smith	Linebackers: 22 Cody Smith; 42 Lawrence Vickerstaff; Defensive backs: 15 John Chisolm; 24 Pat O'Malley; 9 JoJo Polk; 33 Dawon Woodward; Kickers: -- Jared Thomas	Injured reserve: currently vacant; Exempt list: 14 Seth Burkholder K (Exempt); Practice squad: currently vacant; rookies in italics Roster updated March 28, 2011; 23 Active, 0 Inactive, 0 PS

=== All-League selections ===
- WR Ryan Brinson
- DL Antonio Reynolds
- LB Cody Smith

== Head coaches ==
Name	Term	Regular season				Playoffs		Awards
Name	Term	W	L	T	Win%	W	L	Awards
Rashal Hall	2011	1	12	0	.077	0	0	
Paul Farrah	2011	0	1	0	.000	0	0	

== Season-by-season results ==
League champions	Conference champions	Division champions	Wild card berth	League leader

Season	Team	League	Conference	Division	Regular season				Postseason results
Season	Team	League	Conference	Division	Finish	Wins	Losses	Ties	Postseason results
2011	2011	UIFL			6th	1	13	0	
Totals						1	13	0	All-time regular season record (2011)
Totals						0	0	-	All-time postseason record (2011)
Totals						1	13	0	All-time regular season and postseason record (2011)
