= Dray Mason =

American football player (born 1985)

No. 22
- Position: Running back / wide receiver

Personal information
- Born: October 30, 1985 (age 41)
- Listed height: 5 ft 9 in (1.75 m)
- Listed weight: 180 lb (82 kg)

Career information
- High school: Bishop Chatard (Indianapolis, Indiana)
- College: Purdue
- NFL draft: 2008: undrafted

Career history
- Huntington Hammer (2011); Indianapolis Panthers (2013)*; Owensboro Rage (2013); Northern Kentucky River Monsters (2014)
- * Offseason or practice squad member only

Awards and highlights
- 1st Team All-UIFL (2011) (RB); 2nd Team All-UIFL (2011) (AP)

Andray Lee Mason III (born October 30, 1985) is an American former football running back and wide receiver.

== Early life ==
Dray attended Bishop Chatard High School in Indianapolis, Indiana. There he was a standout running back as well as a defensive back, while also playing basketball and track and field. He helped his Trojan teammates win their third consecutive IHSAA Class 3A state championship in a 49–0 victory over NorthWood High School. In his senior season championship game, Mason ran for 205 yards and five touchdowns. During its three-year run, the Trojans owned a 40–5 mark, including a perfect 15–0 season in 2002. The 2003 title moved Bishop Chatard into a tie for most football state championships with seven sharing the mark with Ben Davis High School. He was ranked a three-star prospect by Rivals.com as a cornerback, and his only other FBS school was Northern Illinois University. He was a high school teammate of Ryan Baker.

College recruiting
Name	Hometown	School	Height	Weight	40^{‡}	Commit date
Dray Mason; RB	Indianapolis, Indiana	Bishop Chatard High School	5 ft 10 in (1.78 m)	175 lb (79 kg)	4.4	Jun 28, 2004
Dray Mason; RB	Recruit ratings: Scout: Rivals:					
Overall recruit ranking: Scout: 85 (RB) Rivals: 56 (RB), 8 (IN)
Note: In many cases, Scout, Rivals, 247Sports, On3, and ESPN may conflict in their listings of height and weight.; In these cases, the average was taken. ESPN grades are on a 100-point scale.; Sources: "Purdue Football Commitment List". Rivals.; "Purdue College Football Recruiting Commits". Scout.; "Scout.com Team Recruiting Rankings". Scout.; "2005 Team Ranking". Rivals.com.

Mason committed to Purdue University on June 28, 2004. TerBush was not heavily recruited, as he only had FBS offers from Indiana & Northern Illinois.

== College career ==
Dray attended Purdue University where he was a running back and defensive back under coach Joe Tiller. His freshman season he was redshirted. The next year, he moved from cornerback to running back to help add depth. His sophomore season, he was a contributor on Special Teams, and got one carry for 4 yards. For the 2007 season, Dray was ruled academically ineligible, and didn't play for the Boilermakers.

== Professional career ==
=== Huntington Hammer ===
In 2011, Mason signed to play indoor football with the Huntington Hammer in the UIFL. The Hammer went 7-7 and made the playoffs. Dray was 2nd on the team, but also 2nd in the league in rushing to Martevious Young, and was named 1st Team All-UIFL as a running back, and 2nd Team All-UIFL as an All-Purpose Player.

=== Indianapolis Panthers ===
In 2012, Mason signed with the Indianapolis Panthers who were slated to play in the Ultimate Indoor Football League in 2013. The Panthers however, pulled out of the league due to its southern movement.

=== Owensboro Rage ===
In September 2012, Mason signed with the Owensboro Rage of the Continental Indoor Football League for the 2013 season. Mason will move to wide receiver for the Rage, going away from his natural position of running back.

=== Northern Kentucky River Monsters ===
Mason signed with the Northern Kentucky River Monsters in January 2014.
