= Jason Goode =

American football player (born 1986)

No. 4, 11
- Position: Wide receiver

Personal information
- Born: September 13, 1986 (age 40); Baltimore, Maryland, U.S.
- Listed height: 6 ft 3 in (1.91 m)
- Listed weight: 238 lb (108 kg)

Career information
- High school: Woodlawn (MD)
- College: Maryland
- NFL draft: 2008: undrafted

Career history
- Washington Redskins (2008)*; Maryland Maniacs (2009)*; Carolina Panthers (2009)*; Maryland Maniacs (2010); Johnstown Generals (2012); Baltimore Mariners (2014)
- * Offseason or practice squad member only

Jason Goode (born September 13, 1986) is an American former professional football wide receiver. Goode has previously spent time with the Washington Redskins and Carolina Panthers of the National Football League (NFL). He played college football at Maryland. On August 16, 2008, in a pre-season matchup with the New York Jets, he scored the winning touchdown that gave the Redskins a 13–10 win and a 3–0 pre-season record.

== College career ==
Goode spent his time at Maryland behind Joey Haynos and Dan Gronkowski on the depth chart.

== Professional career ==
=== Washington Redskins ===
Goode signed with the Washington Redskins in 2008 after unselected in the 2008 NFL draft. He was released on August 26, 2008.

=== Maryland Maniacs ===
Goode signed with the Maryland Maniacs of the Indoor Football League in February 2009.

=== Carolina Panthers ===
The Maniacs released Goode on March 17, 2009, so he could sign with the Carolina Panthers.
