= Big Sandy Superstore =

American furniture store chain

Big Sandy Superstore Online Logo

Big Sandy Superstore is a regional furniture store chain with stores located in West Virginia, Indiana, Kentucky, Michigan, Missouri, and Ohio.

In 1953, Big Sandy Superstore was founded in Ashland, Kentucky by Robert Van Hoose. Today the company is one of the nation's top 100 furniture retailers, with 600 employees and operating 16 stores. The company's corporate headquarters is located in Ashland and the distribution center is located in nearby Wheelersburg, Ohio. Big Sandy purchased naming rights to the Huntington Civic Arena in Huntington, West Virginia in 2004, renaming it Big Sandy Superstore Arena until those rights expired in 2019. Big Sandy Superstore became a privately held company in 2019, and expanded into Indiana (Evansville and Mishawaka), Michigan, (Cadillac, Gaylord, Midland, Mt. Pleasant, and Owosso), and Missouri (Cape Girardeau) in 2020.
