= JoJo Polk =

American football player (born 1978)

No. 19, 9
- Position: Defensive back

Personal information
- Born: August 31, 1978 (age 48); Oakland, California, U.S.
- Listed height: 6 ft 0 in (1.83 m)
- Listed weight: 190 lb (86 kg)

Career information
- High school: Lawrence (KS)
- College: Northeastern State
- NFL draft: 2000: undrafted

Career history
- Tulsa Talons (2000); Grand Rapids Rampage (2001–2002); Buffalo Destroyers (2003); Columbus Destroyers (2004–2005); Grand Rapids Rampage (2005); Canton Legends (2006); Orlando Predators (2007); Georgia Force (2008); Reading Express (2009); Canton Cougars (2011)

Awards and highlights
- ArenaBowl champion (2001); 2× AIFA champion (2006, 2009); American Bowl V MVP (2009); AFL All-Rookie Team (2001); AFL Most Inspirational Player of the Year (2001); First-team All-Lone Star Conference (1999)

Career AFL statistics
- Tackles: 273
- Interceptions: 11
- Stats at ArenaFan.com

Joseph Polk (born August 31, 1978) is an American former football defensive back.

In his rookie season in af2 with the Tulsa Talons, Polk tripped over a fallen receiver and slammed headfirst into the padded wall that lines the field. The impact broke his C-6 vertebra, leaving him paralyzed, and unable to move his legs and temporarily without feeling in his hands. He was told that he would not be able to walk again, but he was able to get himself into a healthy enough condition to be able to play football again.

Polk went on to spend 8 years as a player in the Arena Football League. He won the 2001 Most Inspirational Player of the Year after playing his rookie season. He has also won 2 American Indoor Football Association championships playing for both the Canton Legends and the Reading Express.
