= Seth Burkholder =

American football player (born 1982)

No. 14
- Position: Placekicker

Personal information
- Born: December 17, 1982 (age 43); Pandora, Ohio
- Listed height: 6 ft 0 in (1.83 m)
- Listed weight: 190 lb (86 kg)

Career information
- High school: Bluffton High School
- College: Bluffton
- NFL draft: 2006: undrafted

Career history
- Canton Cougars (2011); Marion Blue Racers (2012); Pittsburgh Power (2012); Marion Blue Racers (2013)

Career AFL statistics
- FG made: 0
- FG attempts: 0
- PAT made: 0
- PAT attempts: 3
- Stats at ArenaFan.com

Seth Burkholder (born December 17, 1982) is an American former football placekicker.

Burkholder attended Bluffton High School, in Bluffton, Ohio, where he was a member of the football, basketball, and track teams.

Overlooked graduating from a small high school, Burkholder enrolled at Division III powerhouse Ohio Northern University for his freshman season in the fall of 2001. Burkholder won the starting kicker role in preseason and excelled throughout the regular season. Burkholder was rewarded for his success by being named to the All-Region team. He is the only player in the history of Ohio Northern's storied football program to be named All-Region as a freshman.

After a successful freshman season, Burkholder decided to transfer to Division I member Purdue University.

After sitting out one year as a transfer, he moved back to Ohio and enrolled at Bluffton University where he played his final two seasons of eligibility. In 2004, Burkholder became the starting kicker and punter for the Beavers, a return to Division III. Burkholder went on to start for two outstanding seasons at Bluffton, becoming the only player in the history of the HCAC to be named both first team all conference kicker and first team all conference punter.

After a great collegiate career, Burkholder was invited to multiple NFL combines and tryouts. NFL teams showed interest in Burkholder and he was even placed on several short lists for future team consideration over the next 4 years.

In 2010, Burkholder pursued and started to play both in the minor leagues as well as in arena/indoor football leagues.

In 2018, Burkholder retired from football.

== College career ==
=== Bluffton University ===
Burkholder attended Bluffton University, in Bluffton, Ohio, where he played as a member of the football team. He was once named the NCAA Division 3 Player of the Week after a performance against Anderson University in which he made a 39-yard field goal. He also punted the ball seven times for 287 total yards for an average of 41.0 yards per punt, pinning the Ravens three times within their own 20-yard line. For his career, Burkholder still holds the 6th best punting average (36.1), 5th in career punts (113), 6th in kicker scoring (85), 6th in PAT's made (50) and 2nd in PAT percentage (.909) He also places on several single season records as well.

== Professional career ==
=== Canton Cougars ===
Upon attending the Ultimate Indoor Football League's combine in 2010, Burkholder was drafted 4th overall in the 1st round by the Canton Cougars in the UIFL's Inaugural Draft. Burkholder's 48 yard field goal in the season opener versus the Huntington Hammer was the longest field goal by any kicker in the UIFL.

=== Marion Blue Racers ===
In 2012, Burkholder signed to play with the Marion Blue Racers of the United Indoor Football League.

=== Pittsburgh Power ===
On May 11, 2012, Burkholder was assigned to the Pittsburgh Power of the Arena Football League. Burkholder appeared in just one game with the Power, not attempting any field goals, and going 0 for 3 in PAT attempts. He was reassigned on May 14, 2012, and then suspended on May 15.
