= Allan Holland Jr. =

American football player and coach (born 1984)

Biographical details
- Born: November 13, 1984 (age 41)

Playing career
- 2004–2005: Wake Forest
- 2006–2008: Eastern Kentucky
- 2011–2012: Eastern Kentucky Drillers
- Position: Quarterback

Coaching career (HC unless noted)
- 2009: Eastern Kentucky (GA)
- 2010–2013: Pikeville (OC/QB)
- 2014–2021 (spring): Pikeville

Head coaching record
- Overall: 35–38

Accomplishments and honors

Championships
- 1 MSC East Division (2016)

Allan Holland Jr. (born November 13, 1984) is an American football coach and former player.

== Career ==
He served as the head football coach at the University of Pikeville in Pikeville, Kentucky from 2014 until the conclusion of the 2021 Spring season.

Holland initially played college football at Wake Forest University but transferred to Eastern Kentucky University, where he played quarterback from 2006 to 2008. He also played indoor football for the Eastern Kentucky Drillers of the UIFL from 2011 to 2012.

== Head coaching record ==
Year	Team	Overall	Conference	Standing	Bowl/playoffs
Pikeville Bears (Mid-South Conference) (2014–present)
2014	Pikeville	5–6	4–2	3rd (East)	
2015	Pikeville	4–7	3–2	3rd (East)	
2016	Pikeville	6–5	5–1	T–1st (East)	
2017	Pikeville	5–6	3–3	T–3rd (East)	
2018	Pikeville	6–5	4–2	3rd (Appalachian)	
2019	Pikeville	6–5	4–3	T–3rd (Bluegrass)	
2020–21	Pikeville	3–4	3–4	T–4th (Bluegrass)	
Pikeville:		35–38	26–17		
Total:		35–38			
National championship Conference title Conference division title or championship game berth
