= Michael Robinson (arena football) =

American football player (born 1986)

No. 48
- Position: Defensive end

Personal information
- Born: March 3, 1986 (age 40); Newburgh, New York
- Listed height: 6 ft 4 in (1.93 m)
- Listed weight: 265 lb (120 kg)

Career information
- College: Nassau
- NFL draft: 2006: undrafted

Career history
- Huntington Hammer (2011); Harrisburg Stampede (2011); Lehigh Valley Steelhawks (2012)*; Erie Explosion (2012); Kansas City Command (2012); Philadelphia Soul (2013)*; Pittsburgh Power (2013)*
- * Offseason or practice squad member only

Awards and highlights
- 2011 1st Team All-UIFL; 2012 1st Team All-UIFL North

Career AFL statistics
- Tackles: 6.5
- Sacks: 1
- Stats at ArenaFan.com

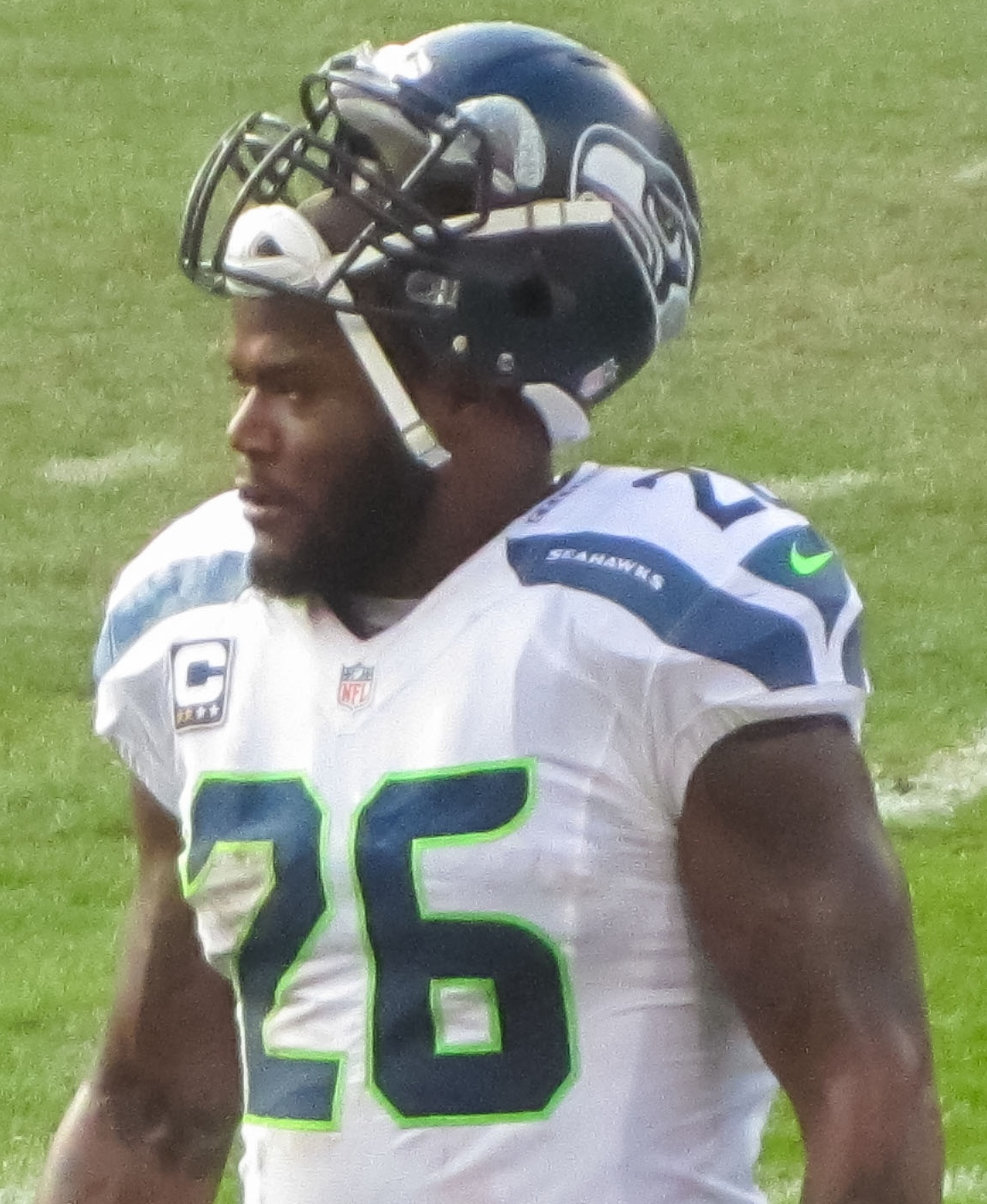
Michael Robinson at Soldier Field, Chicago, 2012

Michael Robinson (born March 3, 1986) is a former professional arena football and indoor football defensive end.

== College career ==
Robinson attended Nassau Community College where he was a standout member of the football team. He was named a 2005 pre-season NJCAA honorable mention as a tight end by Rivals.com.

== Professional career ==
=== Huntington Hammer ===
Robinson was selected with the first pick of the second round (7th overall) by the Huntington Hammer in the 2011 UIFL Draft. Robinson enjoyed a great season with the Hammer, on his way to being named to the 1st Team All-UIFL as a defensive lineman.

=== Harrisburg Stampede ===
Robinson played in one game with the Harrisburg Stampede of the Southern Indoor Football League.

=== Erie Explosion ===
Robinson recorded 20 sacks in 12 games, earning him First Team All-UIFL honors. He also had 14.5 tackles for loss.

=== Kansas City Command ===
Michael's strong UIFL season earned him a call-up to the Kansas City Command, where he recorded five tackles and one sack in three games.

=== Pittsburgh Power ===
Robinson signed with the Pittsburgh Power with one week left in the 2013 regular season.
