= Johnstown Generals =

Logo

General information
- Founded: 2011
- Folded: 2012
- Headquartered: Johnstown, Pennsylvania at the Cambria County War Memorial Arena
- Colors: Navy, Yellow, and White

Personnel
- Owner: Jeff Bollinger
- Head coach: Quenteen Robinson

Team history
- Johnstown Generals (2011–2012)

Home fields
- Cambria County War Memorial Arena (2011–2012)

League / conference affiliations
- Ultimate Indoor Football League (2011–2012)

The Johnstown Generals was a professional indoor football team that was based in Johnstown, Pennsylvania. The team name was derived through a contest. Morgan and Patrick Waugh won the contest with their submission. The Generals began play in 2011 as an expansion team as part of the original Ultimate Indoor Football League six. The fourth indoor football team to play in Johnstown, it succeeded the original Indoor Football League's Johnstown Jackals (2000), the National Indoor Football League's Johnstown J-Dogs (2001), and the American Indoor Football Association's Johnstown Riverhawks (2005–2007).

This team was owned by Jeff Bollinger, and played its home games at the Cambria County War Memorial Arena in Johnstown, Pennsylvania.

== Franchise history ==
=== 2011 ===
The team was coached by Quinteen Robinson, who played on the three previous indoor football teams to play in Johnstown.

== Players of note ==
=== Awards and honors ===
The following is a list of all Generals players who have won league awards:

| Season | Player | Position | Award |
|---|---|---|---|
| 2012 | Matt Domonkos | K | UIFL North Special Teams Player of the Year |
| 2012 | Matt Domonkos | K | 1st Team All-UIFL North |
| 2012 | DeQwan Young | DB | 1st Team All-UIFL North |

=== Other notable former players ===
- Jason Goode – WR
- Shea McKeen – DL
- DeQwan Young – DB

== Head coaches ==
| Name | Term | Regular season | | | | Playoffs | | Awards |
| Name | Term | W | L | T | Win% | W | L | Awards |
|---|---|---|---|---|---|---|---|---|
| Quinteen Robinson | 2011–2012 | 8 | 16 | 0 | .333 | 0 | 0 | |

== Season-by-season results ==
Note: The finish, wins, losses, and ties columns list regular season results and exclude any postseason play.

| League champions | Conference champions | Division champions | Wild card berth | League leader |

| Season | Team | League | Conference | Division | Regular season | | | | Postseason results |
| Season | Team | League | Conference | Division | Finish | Wins | Losses | Ties | Postseason results |
|---|---|---|---|---|---|---|---|---|---|
| 2011 | 2011 | UIFL | | | 5th | 6 | 8 | | |
| 2012 | 2012 | UIFL | Northern | | 4th | 2 | 8 | | |
| Totals | | | | | | 8 | 16 | | All-time regular season record (2011–2012) |
| Totals | | | | | | 0 | 0 | - | All-time postseason record (2011–2012) |
| Totals | | | | | | 8 | 16 | | All-time regular season and postseason record (2011–2012) |
