= Martevious Young =

American football player (born 1988)

No. 1, 14
- Position: Quarterback

Personal information
- Born: February 16, 1988 (age 38); Alexander City, Alabama, U.S.
- Listed height: 6 ft 2 in (1.88 m)
- Listed weight: 190 lb (86 kg)

Career information
- High school: Benjamin Russell (Alexander City)
- College: Southern Miss
- NFL draft: 2011: undrafted

Career history
- Huntington Hammer (2011); Omaha Beef (2012); Sioux Falls Storm (2013–2015)

Awards and highlights
- 3× United Bowl champion (2013–2015)

Martevious Young (born February 16, 1988) is an American former football quarterback.

== Early life ==
Born to Robin Robinson, who died an early death, Martevious was raised by his guardians. He played for Coach Willie Carl Martin at Benjamin Russell High School, where he was named a Permanent Starter. He was also a 5A Best Player in state nominee, a Super 12 selection, All-district in his junior and senior years. Went to the playoffs every year as a starter, and averaged eight to nine wins as a starter each season. Also lettered three years in baseball and two years in basketball. He was a starting pitcher on the state all-star team. And also won the Bryant Jordan Scholarship Award for academic and community service. A received a two-star rating by Rivals.com and Scout.com. Was named All-Southeast Region by SuperPrep, and played in the North/South and East/West All-Star games in baseball, as well as named all-county in basketball.

== College career ==
Martevious decided on playing college football for the University of Southern Mississippi. He had offers from University of Louisville and the University of Alabama-Birmingham. His freshman year in 2005, he redshirted. Saw action in two games, drawing one start. He completed one pass for two yards, and had three yards on one carry. Missed the remainder of the season with a broken leg after getting hurt on the third play of the game against Rice (10/3) in his first start. As a sophomore, he played in two games, in which he threw for six yards on 1-of-2 passing with an interception during season. He also added five rushes for 42 yards. Took over as starting quarterback beginning his junior year, completing 132-of-230 (57.4 percent) passing attempts with only three interceptions for a passer rating of 145.71 and 1,861 yards. He had 16 touchdown passes, throwing at least one touchdown pass in each of the last seven games and two or more five times during that stretch, leading the team to the 2009 New Orleans Bowl, where he completed 18-of-34 (52.9 percent) passing attempts for 271 yards with three touchdown passes and two interceptions. Also had nine rushes for 24 yards. As a senior, he played in six games and registered 12-of-23 passing for 132 yards coming off the bench.

== Professional career ==
After completing his senior year of college, Martevious decided to sign with the Huntington Hammer, rather than wait for the opportunity to be called in the 2011 NFL draft. Young encountered an up and down season, as he totaled 201 completions on 432 attempts with 39 touchdowns and 20 interceptions. His dual threat ability was not completely contained in the indoor game, as he led the league in rushing with 358 yards. He was able to guide the Hammer to a 7-7 finish and a playoff appearance. The Hammer ultimately lost in the opening round of the playoffs by a score of 20-4.

After a productive season with the Hammer, Young signed to play the 2012 season with the Omaha Beef of the Indoor Football League (IFL).

Young signed with the Sioux Falls Storm, also of the IFL. He was tasked with the job of replacing Sioux Falls quarterback Chris Dixon.
