= Ultimate Bowl =

The Ultimate Bowl was the annual championship game of the Ultimate Indoor Football League (UIFL). In 2011, it was the meeting of the two semifinal game winners. In 2012, it was the meeting of the winners of the North and South Divisions.

== Past Ultimate Bowls ==
Game	Year	Winning Team		Losing Team		Site	Date	MVP
Ultimate Bowl I	2011	Saginaw Sting	86	Eastern Kentucky Drillers	69	Dow Event Center	June 10, 2011	Tommy Jones
Ultimate Bowl II	2012	Cincinnati Commandos	62	Florida Tarpons	44	Germain Arena	July 2, 2012	Kyenes Mincy
Ultimate Bowl III	2013	Florida Tarpons	40	Corpus Christi Fury	32	Germain Arena	June 8, 2013	Chris Wallace
Ultimate Bowl IV	2014	Corpus Christi Fury	60	Florida Tarpons	23	American Bank Center	August 2, 2014	Reuben Flowers

- Number of appearances:
  - Saginaw Sting: 1 1-0
  - Eastern Kentucky Drillers: 1 0-1
  - Cincinnati Commandos: 1 1-0
  - Florida Tarpons: 3 1-2
  - Corpus Christi Fury: 2 1-1

== Box scores ==
=== Ultimate Bowl I: Eastern Kentucky Drillers vs. Saginaw Sting ===
Ultimate Bowl I: Eastern Kentucky Drillers at Saginaw Sting – Game summary

Quarter	1	2	3	4	Total
Drillers	14	19	8	28	69
Sting	21	20	10	35	86

at Dow Event Center, Saginaw, Michigan

- Date: June 10, 2011
- Game time: 7:30 p.m. EDT
- Game attendance: 2,300

Game information

1st quarter

- Eastern Kentucky - (12:56) Matthew Barbour 8-yard pass from Allan Holland (Daniel Eidson kick), Eastern Kentucky 7-0
- Saginaw – (11:15) LaVaughn Macon 7-yard pass from Tommy Jones (Chris Kollias kick), 7–7
- Saginaw – (7:08) LaVaughn Macon 12-yard pass from Tommy Jones (Chris Kollias kick), Saginaw 14–7
- Eastern Kentucky - (4:08) Justin Lamb 12-yard pass from Allan Holland (Daniel Eidson kick), 14-14
- Saginaw – (0:45) LaVaughn Macon 9-yard pass from Tommy Jones (Chris Kollias kick), Saginaw 21–14

2nd quarter

- Saginaw – (10:25) Zac Nichols 40-yard pass from Tommy Jones (Chris Kollias kick), Saginaw 28–14
- Eastern Kentucky - (1:00) Matthew Barbour 12-yard pass from Allan Holland (Daniel Eidson kick failed), Saginaw 28-20
- Saginaw – (0:46) LaVaughn Macon 24-yard pass from Tommy Jones (Chris Kollias kick), Saginaw 35–20
- Eastern Kentucky - (0:27) Aric Evans 30-yard pass from Allan Holland (Allan Holland pass failed), Saginaw 35-26
- Saginaw – (0:13) Zac Nichols 19-yard pass from Tommy Jones (Chris Kollias kick failed), Saginaw 41–26
- Eastern Kentucky - (0:00) Matthew Barbour 23-yard pass from Allan Holland (Daniel Eidson kick), Saginaw 41-33

3rd quarter

- Saginaw – (13:00) LaVaughn Macon 8-yard pass from Tommy Jones (Chris Kollias kick), Saginaw 48–33
- Saginaw – (4:13) Chris Kollias 55-yard field goal, Saginaw 51–33
- Eastern Kentucky - (1:15) Matthew Barbour 21-yard pass from Allan Holland (Matthew Barbour pass from Allan Holland), Saginaw 51-41

4th quarter

- Saginaw – (14:36) LaVaughn Macon 23-yard pass from Tommy Jones (Chris Kollias kick), Saginaw 58–41
- Eastern Kentucky - (11:43) Matthew Barbour 4-yard pass from Allan Holland (Jason Connor rush failed), Saginaw 58-47
- Saginaw – (8:40) Zac Nichols 20-yard pass from Tommy Jones (Chris Kollias kick), Saginaw 65–47
- Eastern Kentucky - (5:16) Justin Lamb 11-yard pass from Allan Holland (Mattthew Barbour pass from Allan Holland), Saginaw 65-55
- Saginaw – (2:11) Andrew Beaver 10-yard pass from Tommy Jones (Chris Kollias kick failed), Saginaw 71–55
- Eastern Kentucky - (0:38) Justin Lamb 6-yard pass from Allan Holland (Allan Holland pass failed), Saginaw 71-61
- Saginaw – (0:15) Yvens Louis 7-yard run (Chris Kollias kick), Saginaw 78–61
- Saginaw – (0:15) Chris Kollias rouge, Saginaw 79–61
- Eastern Kentucky - (0:08) Matthew Barbour 40-yard pass from Daniel Eidson (Matthew Barbour pass from Daniel Eidson), Saginaw 79-69
- Saginaw – (0:02) Philip Smith 5-yard kickoff return (Chris Kollias kick), Saginaw 86–69

Passing

- Eastern Kentucky– Allan Holland: 23/46, 280 yards, 9 TD
- Saginaw – Tommy Jones: 25/36, 346 yards, 10 TD

Rushing

- Eastern Kentucky – Allan Holland: 2 att, 14 yards, 0 TD
- Saginaw – Yvens Louis: 1 att, 7 yards, 1 TD

Receiving

- Eastern Kentucky – Matthew Barbour: 12 rec, 153 yards, 6 TD
- Saginaw – LaVaughn Macon: 10 rec, 118 yards, 6 TD
