= 2011 UIFL season =

- League: Ultimate Indoor Football League
- Sport: Indoor Football
- Duration: February 18, 2011 – June 9, 2011

Regular season
- Season champions: Northern Kentucky River Monsters
- Season MVP: Jared Lorenzen, NKY

League postseason
- 1 vs 4 UIFL Semifinals champions: Saginaw Sting
- 1 vs 4 UIFL Semifinals runners-up: Northern Kentucky River Monsters
- 2 vs 3 UIFL Semifinals champions: Eastern Kentucky Drillers
- 2 vs 3 UIFL Semifinals runners-up: Huntington Hammer

Ultimate Bowl I
- Champions: Saginaw Sting
- Runners-up: Eastern Kentucky Drillers
- Finals MVP: Tommy Jones (SAG)

UIFL seasons
- 2012 →

The 2011 Ultimate Indoor Football League season was the first season of the league. The regular season lasted from February 18 to May 29 and the postseason, will be held the following two weeks with the championship game being held at the highest remaining seed. The 2011 season went off without any teams folding or any games being missed or rescheduled. The Northern Kentucky River Monsters finished with the best regular season record, finished 11–3. However, due to league sanctions they were not able to host an playoff games and were dropped to a four seed.

Saginaw finished 9–5, followed by Eastern Kentucky 8–6, Huntington 7–7, Johnstown 6–8 and Canton 1–13.

Saginaw defeated Northern Kentucky, 48–47, in the first semifinals of the Ultimate Bowl I playoffs, sponsored by Trophy Awards. In the other semifinal game, Eastern Kentucky advanced to the championship game with a 20–4 victory over Huntington. The 2011 Ultimate Bowl, sponsored by Trophy Awards, was played Friday, June 9 at the Dow Center in Saginaw, MI with the Sting claiming an 86–69 victory over the visiting Drillers.

Following the elimination of the Northern Kentucky River Monsters from the playoffs, NKY owner Jill Chitwood and the UIFL came to terms that allowed the River Monsters to leave the UIFL, but the team folded after rumors of joining the Continental Indoor Football League.

== UIFL draft ==
*	= First-team All-UIFL selection
^	= Second-team All-UIFL selection

Positions key
Offense	Defense	Special teams
QB — Quarterback; RB — Running back; FB — Fullback; WR — Wide receiver; TE — Tight end; OL — Offensive lineman; T — Tackle; G — Guard; C — Center	DL — Defensive lineman; DE — Defensive end (Note: Sometimes referred to as an edge rusher (EDGE)); DT — Defensive tackle (Note: Includes nose tackle (NT)); LB — Linebacker (Note: Includes middle linebacker (MLB or MIKE), outside linebacker (OLB, WILL, SAM), and off-ball linebacker); DB — Defensive back; CB — Cornerback; S — Safety (Note: Includes free safety (FS) and strong safety (SS))	K — Kicker (Note: Also known as a placekicker (PK)); P — Punter; LS — Long snapper; RS — Return specialist (Note: Includes kickoff and punt returners)

The following is the breakdown of the 24 players selected by position:

- 7 Defensive lineman
- 7 Wide receivers
- 6 Defensive backs
- 4 Offensive lineman
- 3 Linebackers
- 1 Quarterbacks
- 1 Fullbacks
- 1 Placekicker

Round	Pick	Position	Player	Team
1	1	DL	Victor Sesay	Johnstown Generals
1	2	DL/LB	Josh Kaltsas	Huntington Hammer
1	3	WR/DB	Sly Brumfield	Northern Kentucky River Monsters
1	4	K	Seth Burkholder	Canton Cougars
1	5	WR/DB	Taneareus Collins	Eastern Kentucky Drillers
1	6	WR	Nico Smith	Saginaw Sting
2	7	DL	Michael Robinson	Huntington Hammer
2	8	DL	Chris Foster	Huntington Hammer
2	9	OL	George Frisch	Northern Kentucky River Monsters
2	10	DL	Donald Foster	Canton Cougars
2	11	OL	Steve Pytosh	Eastern Kentucky Drillers
2	12	DB	Tony Norman	Saginaw Sting
3	13	LB	Daniel Eason	Johnstown Generals
3	14	WR	Jeff Phillips	Huntington Hammer
3	15	LB	Jon D'Angelo	Northern Kentucky River Monsters
3	16	OL/DL	Brian Pittman	Canton Cougars
3	17	WR/DB	David Pickett	Eastern Kentucky Drillers
3	18	DB	Rodney Daniels	Saginaw Sting
4	19	OL/DL	Mike Murphy	Johnstown Generals
4	20	QB	Jeremy Greenleaf	Huntington Hammer
4	21	DB	Greg Johnston	Northern Kentucky River Monsters
4	22	FB	Kevin Robinson	Canton Cougars
4	23	WR	Chris Downer	Eastern Kentucky Drillers
4	24	WR	Brian Ritter	Saginaw Sting

== Standings ==
2011 UIFL standings (Note: http://www.theuifl.com/01/UIFLStats/confsked.htm)
Team	W	L	T	PCT	PF	PA	STK
y-Northern Kentucky River Monsters (Note: Although Northern Kentucky were awarded the season title, they entered the postseason as the 4 seed due to salary cap violations.)	11	3	0	.786	569	417	L1
x-Saginaw Sting	10	4	0	.714	473	415	L2
x-Eastern Kentucky Drillers	8	6	0	.571	390	373	W1
x-Huntington Hammer	7	7	0	.500	377	328	W2
Johnstown Generals	6	8	0	.429	292	416	W2
Canton Cougars	1	13	0	.071	370	522	L10

y - clinched regular-season title

x - clinched playoff spot

== Statistics ==
=== Passing ===
Player	Comp.	Att.	Comp%	Yards	TD's	INT's	Long
Jared Lorenzen (NKY)	282	490	57.6	3,473	81	19	48
Tommy Jones (SAG)	304	488	62.3	3,400	87	25	46
Allan Holland (EKY)	200	381	52.5	2,386	53	18	42
Martevious Young (HUNT)	201	432	46.5	2,199	39	20	45
Ray Marrow (CAN)	84	167	50.3	1,243	31	8	47

=== Rushing ===
Player	Car.	Yards	Avg.	TD's	Long
Martevious Young (HUNT)	85	358	4.2	12	33
Maurice Douse (NKY)	80	268	3.3	12	33
Dray Mason (HUNT)	76	309	4.1	9	25
Terrell Simms (JOHN)	80	240	3.0	7	18
Robert Haynes (SAG)	30	123	4.1	4	27

=== Receiving ===
Player	Rec.	Yards	Avg.	TD's	Long
Ricardo Lenhart (NKY)	116	1,359	11.7	34	48
Matthew Barbour (EKY)	94	1,216	12.9	25	42
Willie Idlette (NKY)	91	1,178	12.9	21	40
LaVaughn Macon (SAG)	101	1,184	11.7	32	41
Zac Nichols (SAG)	71	1,013	14.3	25	46

== 2011 playoffs ==
Semifinals
3	Huntington	4
2	Eastern Kentucky	20
4	Northern Kentucky	47
1	Saginaw	48

Ultimate Bowl I
2	Eastern Kentucky	69
1	Saginaw	86

== Awards ==
- Most Valuable Player, Jared Lorenzen QB Northern Kentucky
- Offensive Player of the Year, Tommy Jones QB Saginaw
- Defensive Player of the Year, Thomas McKenzie DL Northern Kentucky

=== First-team All-UIFL ===
Offense
Quarterback	Jared Lorenzen, Northern Kentucky; Tommy Jones, Saginaw
Running back	Dray Mason, Huntington
Wide receiver	Ricardo Lenhart, Northern Kentucky; Ryan Brinson, Canton; Aric Evans, Eastern Kentucky
Offensive line	Khalil El-Amin, Northern Kentucky; Matt Rahn, Northern Kentucky; Rashaud Mungro, Eastern Kentucky

Defense
Defensive line	Mike McFadden, Saginaw; Thomas McKenzie, Northern Kentucky; Michael Robinson, Huntington
Linebacker	Phillip Smith, Saginaw
Jill	Jon D'Angelo, Northern Kentucky
Cornerback	David Jones, Eastern Kentucky; DeQwan Young, Johnstown
Safety	Matt Speed, Johnstown

Special teams
Kicker	Dustin Zink, Northern Kentucky
Special Teams	Maurice Douse, Northern Kentucky

=== Second-team All-UIFL ===
Offense
Quarterback	None
Running back	Maurice Douse, Northern Kentucky
Wide receiver	Willie Idlette, Northern Kentucky; LaVaughn Macon, Saginaw; Harry Lewis, Northern Kentucky
Offensive line	George Frisch, Northern Kentucky; Eric Brim, Saginaw; Steve Michalek, Saginaw

Defense
Defensive line	Antonio Reynolds, Canton; D'arrell Brown, Northern Kentucky; Victor Sesay, Johnstown
Linebacker	Santino Turnbow, Northern Kentucky
Jill	Cody Smith, Canton
Cornerback	Jaret Sanderson, Huntington; Jason Connor, Eastern Kentucky; Butch Abshire, Eastern Kentucky
Safety	Tez Morris, Northern Kentucky

Special teams
Kicker	Daniel Edison, Eastern Kentucky
Special Teams	Dray Mason, Huntington

=== Players of the Week ===
Week
Week	Offense	Defense	Special Teams
Week 1	Aric Evans (EKY)	Kevin Allen Jr. (HUN)	David Jones (EKY)
Week 2	Tommy Jones (SAG)	Kenneth Joshen (NKY)	Brandon Miller (EKY)
Week 3	Harry Lewis (NKY)	Victor Sesay (JOH)	Dustin Zink (NKY)
Week 4	Allan Holland (EKY)	DeQwan Young (JOH)	Maurice Douse (NKY)
Week 5	Martevious Young (HUN)/Ryan Brison (CAN)	Thomas McKenzie (NKY)	Dustin Zink (NKY)
Week 6	Jared Lorenzen (NKY)	Andre Portis (HUN)	Chris Kolias (SAG)
Week 7	Jared Lorenzen (NKY)	Santino Turnbow (NKY)	Matt Demunkus (JOH)
Week 8	Jared Lorenzen (NKY)	Phillip Smith (SAG)	Dustin Zink (NKY)
Week 9	Ray Marrow (CAN)	Brett Hamblen (NKY)	Andrew Beaver (SAG)
Week 10	Ricardo Lenhart (NKY)	John Jacobs (SAG)	Daniel Eidson (EKY)
Week 11	Ricardo Lenhart (NKY)	Marcus McClinton (EKY)	Dustin Zink (NKY)
Week 12	LaVaughn Macon (SAG)	Toheeb Akinola (JOH)	Matt Demunkus (JOH)
Week 13	Tommy Jones (SAG)	Jon D’Angelo (NKY)	Chris Kolias (SAG)
Week 14	Jared Lorenzen (NKY)	DeQwan Young (JOH)	Victor Smith (HUN)
Week 15	Ryan Wells (NKY)	Aaron Princes (JOH)	Daniel Eidson (EKY)

2011 Ultimate Indoor Football League seasons
Canton	Eastern Kentucky	Huntington	Johnstown	Northern Kentucky	Saginaw
