= Kentucky Drillers =

Logo

General information
- Founded: 2010
- Folded: 2013
- Headquartered: Pikeville, Kentucky at Eastern Kentucky Expo Center
- Colors: Black, yellow, white
- Mascot: Digger
- kentuckydrillers.com

Personnel
- Owner: Rick Kranz
- General manager: Rick Kranz
- Head coach: Rick Kranz
- President: Rick Kranz

Team history
- Eastern Kentucky Drillers (2010-2012); Kentucky Xtreme (2013–2014)

Home fields
- Eastern Kentucky Expo Center (2013)

League / conference affiliations
- United Indoor Football League (2011–2012); Continental Indoor Football League (2013)

The Kentucky Drillers were a professional indoor football team based in Pikeville, Kentucky. The franchise started as the Eastern Kentucky Drillers and joined the Continental Indoor Football League (CIFL) in 2013 after playing their first two seasons as a charter member of the Ultimate Indoor Football League (UIFL) for its inaugural 2011 season. The owner of the Drillers was Rick Kranz. The Drillers played their home games at the Eastern Kentucky Expo Center in Pikeville, Kentucky.

== Franchise history ==
=== 2011 ===
On November 26, 2010, the UIFL announced that the team in Pikeville, Kentucky, would be named the Eastern Kentucky Drillers. The Owner of the team Rick Kranz and the Head Coach and Kirk Ramsey on the defensive side, Drillers lost their first game in franchise history, a 44–49 defeat to the hands of the Saginaw Sting. Even in the defeat, two Drillers (Aric Evans and David Jones), won the first ever Offensive Player of the Week and Special Teams Player of the Week Awards in the history of the Ultimate Indoor Football League. The following week, the Drillers played their first ever home game at Eastern Kentucky Expo Center, and in front of 3,500 fans, the Drillers won 37–26 over the Huntington Hammer.

=== 2012 ===
The Drillers made few changes to their team going into 2012, but the hiring of defensive coordinator, Jimmy Brookins is going to be vital to another Ultimate Bowl run, as he looked to keep the Drillers atop the UIFL rankings for defense. Kirk Ramsey moves over to work with the Db and Wr stepping away from the Dc position.

=== 2013 ===
On July 19, 2012, it was announced that the Drillers would leave the UIFL and join the Continental Indoor Football League, and change their name to the Kentucky Drillers. During this season, Prestonsburg, Kentucky, mayor and Drillers' investor, Jerry Fannin, used city money to help fund the team. It was estimated he spent approximately $7,800 on the team and he was charged in February 2017.

== Awards and honors ==
The following is a list of all (Eastern) Kentucky Drillers players who won individual awards and honors.

Season	Player	Position	Award
2011	Aric Evans	WR	1st Team All-UIFL
2011	Rashaud Mungro	OL	1st Team All-UIFL
2011	David Jones	DB	1st Team All-UIFL
2011	Jason Connor	DB	2nd Team All-UIFL
2011	Butch Abshire	DB	2nd Team All-UIFL
2011	Daniel Eidson	K	2nd Team All-UIFL
2012	Maurice Douse	RB	1st Team All-UIFL South
2012	Aric Evans	WR	1st Team All-UIFL South
2012	Joe Parker	OL	1st Team All-UIFL South
2012	George Jackson	DB	1st Team All-UIFL South
2012	Allan Holland	QB	UIFL South Honorable Mention
2012	Lynell Suggs	WR	UIFL South Honorable Mention
2012	Phil Blaising	C	UIFL South Honorable Mention
2012	Ellery Moore	DL	UIFL South Honorable Mention
2012	Shawn Lewis	DL	UIFL South Honorable Mention
2012	Andre Hatchett	LB	UIFL South Honorable Mention
2012	Miquel Carodine	DB	UIFL South Honorable Mention
2012	Daniel Eidson	K	UIFL South Honorable Mention

== Head coaches ==
Name	Term	Regular season				Playoffs		Awards
Name	Term	W	L	T	Win%	W	L	Awards
Lance Brown	2011	8	6	0	.571	1	1	
Rick Kranz	2012–2013	8	12	0	.400	0	0	

== Season-by-season results ==
League champions	Conference champions	Division champions	Wild card berth	League leader

Season	Team	League	Conference	Division	Regular season				Postseason results
Season	Team	League	Conference	Division	Finish	Wins	Losses	Ties	Postseason results
Eastern Kentucky Drillers
2011	2011	UIFL			3rd	8	6	0	Won UIFL semifinals (Hammer) 20–4; Lost Ultimate Bowl I (Sting) 69–86
2012	2012	UIFL	South		2nd	6	4	0	
Kentucky Drillers
2013	2013	CIFL			7th	2	8	0	
Totals						16	18	0	All-time regular season record (2011–2013)
Totals						1	1	—	All-time postseason record (2011–2013)
Totals						17	19	0	All-time regular season and postseason record (2011–2013)
