= Cambria County War Memorial Arena =

Indoor Arena in Johnstown, PA

Coordinates: 40.32296°N 78.922654°W

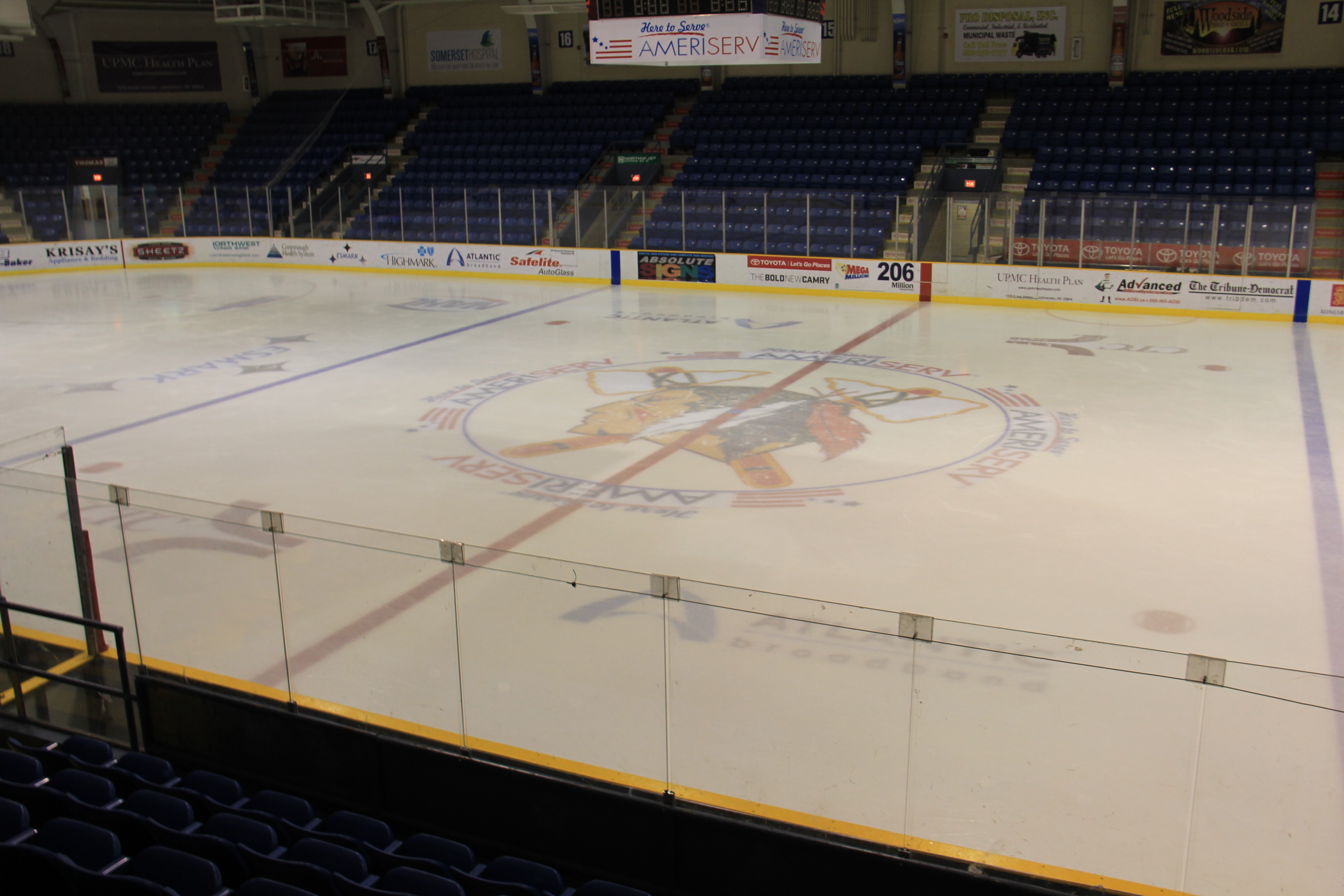
- Interactive map of Cambria County War Memorial Arena
- Former names: War Memorial of Greater Johnstown (1943-1946); Cambria County War Memorial Inc.(1946-1950) (Note: The War Memorial used "Greater Johnstown War Memorial" and "Cambria County War Memorial Inc." during fundraiser events prior to the construction of the arena.)
- Location: 326 Napoleon Street; Johnstown, Pennsylvania, US 15901
- Owner: Cambria County
- Operator: SMG
- Capacity: Ice hockey: 4,001
- Surface: multi-surface (ice)

Construction
- Groundbreaking: October 31, 1949
- Opened: October 16, 1950
- Renovated: 2002; 2015-16
- Cost: $1.5 million ($20.3 million in 2025 dollars)

Tenants
- Johnstown Jets (EAHL/IHL/EHL/NAHL) (1950–1977); Johnstown Wings/Red Wings (NEHL/EHL) (1978–1980); Johnstown Chiefs (ECHL) (1988–2010); Johnstown Riverhawks (AIFL/AIFA) (2005–2007); Johnstown Generals (UIFL) (2011–2012); Johnstown Tomahawks (NAHL) (2012–present)

The Cambria County War Memorial Arena is a 4,001-seat multi-purpose arena in Johnstown, Pennsylvania, United States. It is managed by SMG Entertainment.

It was built in 1950, for the Johnstown Jets of the Eastern Hockey League. The arena was built on the site of the Union Cemetery, Johnstown's first cemetery. The film Slap Shot, based on the Jets, was filmed in this arena. The arena was the home of the Johnstown Chiefs (ice hockey) for 22 years, but they were relocated in 2010 to Greenville, South Carolina. A banner was hung at the final home game on April 4, 2010, stating "The Greatest Fans in Hockey." It was the alternate venue of the Wheeling Nailers for the following two seasons.

The arena is home to the Johnstown Tomahawks of the NAHL and the Pitt-Johnstown Ice Cats of the College Hockey East.

== Events ==
The arena plays host to a variety of events throughout the year. Many local high schools and youth leagues also use the arena for their games. The arena hosts the annual PIAA Southwest Regional Wrestling Tournament, the Pennsylvania Cheerleading Championships, and basketball championship games for PIAA District 6 and the Laurel Highlands Athletic Conference.

The arena has hosted political rallies with presidents John F. Kennedy, Richard Nixon, George W. Bush, Donald Trump, and vice presidential candidates Alaska governor Sarah Palin and Senator John Edwards.

Performances at the Cambria County War Memorial Arena over the years have included AC/DC, Aerosmith, Alabama, Alice Cooper, Beach Boys, Blue Öyster Cult, Bo Diddley, Bob Hope, Bob Dylan, Bob Seger, Bon Jovi, Boston, Bryan Adams, Brad Paisley, Brooks & Dunn, Bruce Springsteen, Cheap Trick, Chicago, Corey Hart, Crosby, Stills, Nash & Young, Dave Clark Five, Def Leppard, Dolly Parton, Duke Ellington, Earth, Wind & Fire, Foghat, Foreigner, George Jones, George Strait, Heart, Billy Idol, Iron Maiden, Jay Leno, Jeff Dunham, Johnny Cash, Johnny Mathis, Josh Turner, Judas Priest, Kansas, Kelly Clarkson, Kenny Rogers, Kid Rock, Kiss, Larry the Cable Guy, LeAnn Rimes, Lonestar, Loverboy, Loretta Lynn, Louis Armstrong, Lynyrd Skynyrd, Matchbox Twenty, Martina McBride, Merle Haggard, MercyMe, Meredith Andrews, Metallica, Miranda Lambert, Nat King Cole, Night Ranger, Ozzy Osbourne, Phyllis Diller, Quiet Riot, RATT, Reba McEntire, Rebecca Lynn Howard, REO Speedwagon, Rob Zombie, Rush, Santana, Sara Evans, Skillet, Rick Springfield, Styx, The Carpenters, The Hooters, The Supremes, TobyMac, Tom Jones, Trace Adkins, Randy Travis, Willie Nelson, The Yardbirds, and ZZ Top.

Other events have included Ringling Bros. and Barnum & Bailey Circus, Disney On Ice, Sesame Street Live, Harlem Globetrotters, Alvin and the Chimpmunks, WCW, Professional Bull Riders, Impact, WWE SmackDown Wrestling and WWE NXT wrestling.

== Teams ==
=== Past ===
The Cambria County War Memorial hosted several minor league hockey teams. The Johnstown Jets called the arena home from 1950 until 1977 and won four league championships during their time at the arena. The Johnstown flood of 1977 caused damage to the arena and the ice-making equipment, which resulted in the Jets folding the franchise during the 1977 offseason.

The Johnstown Wings joined the newly founded Northeastern Hockey League in 1978 and were rebranded as the Johnstown Red Wings after they secured an affiliation with the NHL's Detroit Red Wings in 1979. The franchise averaged 2,309 fans over the two seasons and folded after the 1979–80 season.

Professional hockey returned to the War Memorial a third time when ACHL franchise owner Henry Brabham wanted to place a new franchise in Johnstown. The Johnstown Chiefs were founded in January 1988 and played one partial season in the AAHL. The Chiefs would leave the AAHL for the ECHL (a league co-founded by Brabham) during the 1987-88 offseason, where they played until 2009–10. The Chiefs were relocated to Greenville, South Carolina after the 2009-10 ECHL season and rebranded as the Greenville Road Warriors.

Upon the Chiefs' departure, the Wheeling Nailers played one preseason game and 10 regular season "home" games at the War Memorial during the 2010-11 ECHL season and another 10 regular season "home" games during the 2011-12 ECHL season.

The Cambria County War Memorial also hosted several indoor football franchise. The Johnstown Riverhawks of the Atlantic Indoor Football League (later renamed American Indoor Football) called the Cambria Country War Memorial home from 2005 to 2008, posting records of 6–4, 8–6, and 6-9 respectively before folding in the 2008 offseason.

Arena football returned to the Cambria County War Memorial a second time in 2011 with the UIFL's Johnstown Generals. The team played two seasons in the arena, compiling records of 6-8 and 2-8 respectively. The Generals were suspended by the UIFL on May 15, 2012 "due to a lack of funds", and suspended operations during the 2012 offseason.

Saint Francis of Loretto, Pennsylvania hosted select men's basketball home games at the venue shortly after it opened.

=== Present ===
The University of Pittsburgh at Johnstown Ice Cats' hockey team (CHE) is one of the War Memorial primary tenants and is currently the longest-serving tenant at the arena, having played there since 2009.

The Johnstown Tomahawks of the North American Hockey League moved into the War Memorial for the 2012-13 hockey season.

Four local high school ice hockey teams utilize the arena as their home. These teams include Bishop McCort High School and Westmont Hilltop High School of the PIHL and Conemaugh Valley High School and Greater Johnstown High School of the LMHL. The Westmont Hilltoppers won a PIHL championship in 2003 and the Bishop McCort Crushers won the Pennsylvania Cup in 1994, 1995, 1996, 1997, and 1999.

The Johnstown Warriors is the arena's amateur youth representative, and competes in the PAHL.

== Renovations ==
In 2002, a $16.2 million grant from the commonwealth was approved for an entertainment complex in downtown Johnstown. In addition, the Tampa Bay Lightning organization contributed significant funds toward a renovation of the arena. As part of the grant, the Cambria County War Memorial Arena underwent an $8 million renovation. This included the addition of new seating, heating, ventilation and air conditioning, dasher boards, an elevator to the second floor, and general building enhancements. The project was completed in August 2003. The arena's capacity for hockey is 4,001.

== Hockeyville USA ==
In 2015, the Cambria County War Memorial Arena was nominated to the top 10 of the first ever Kraft Hockeyville USA contest with Pullar Stadium (Sault Sainte Marie, Michigan), HealthyZone Rink (East Aurora, New York), Highgate Sports Arena (Highgate, Vermont), and the Quincy Youth Arena (Quincy, Massachusetts). With winning round 1 the War Memorial moved to round 2 with Pullar Stadium. Johnstown won round two, advancing to the finals against Decatur Civic Center (Decatur, Illinois). In the final round, Johnstown won and the War Memorial was given $150,000 in upgrades and hosted an NHL Preseason Game on September 29, 2015. The match up included the Pittsburgh Penguins defeating the Tampa Bay Lightning, 4–2.
