= Appalachian Wireless Arena =

Multi-purpose arena in Pikeville, Kentucky, US

- Interactive map of Appalachian Wireless Arena
- Former names: Eastern Kentucky Expo Center (2005–2019)
- Location: 126 Main Street; Pikeville, Kentucky
- Coordinates: 37°28′54″N 82°30′54″W
- Owner: Commonwealth of Kentucky
- Operator: City of Pikeville
- Capacity: 7,000 (concerts); 5,700 (sporting events)

Construction
- Opened: October 2005
- Cost: $29 million ($47.8 million in 2025 dollars)

Tenants
- Pikeville Bears basketball (NAIA) (2005–present); East Kentucky Miners (CBA) (2007–2009); East Kentucky Energy (ABA) (2010–2012); Kentucky Drillers (CIFL/UIFL) (2011–2013)

Website
- https://www.appalachianwirelessarena.com

The Appalachian Wireless Arena is a multi-purpose arena in Pikeville, Kentucky. Opened in October 2005, it hosts various local concerts and sporting events for the area. The facility, which can seat 7,000 for concerts and 5,700 for sporting events, is owned by the Commonwealth of Kentucky and managed by the City of Pikeville.

== History ==
From 2005 to 2019, the facility was named the Eastern Kentucky Expo Center, however in June 2019 naming rights were sold to Appalachian Wireless, as part of a 5-year, $85,000/year contract.

On October 22, 2022, the Kentucky Wildcats men's basketball played the annual Blue-White intra-squad scrimmage, normally held at Rupp Arena at Appalachian Wireless Arena to raise money for relief due to the 2022 Eastern Kentucky floods. The event raised over $160,000.

After flooding caused extensive damage to parts of Pike County during the February 2025 North American storm complex, Appalachian Wireless Arena acted as an aid distribution center to the surrounding area.

== About ==
- 7,000-seat arena
- 26,000 sq. feet facility— 24,000 sq. foot arena floor
- 5,000 sq. feet of meeting room/ballroom space with sub divisible wall
- Boardroom space for smaller meetings
- 3 Levels: event level, main concourse, upper level
- 5 concession stands around the main concourse level
- Full Service Food & Beverage Department by Elite Catering
