= Marshall Health Network Arena =

Arena and conference center in Huntington, West Virginia

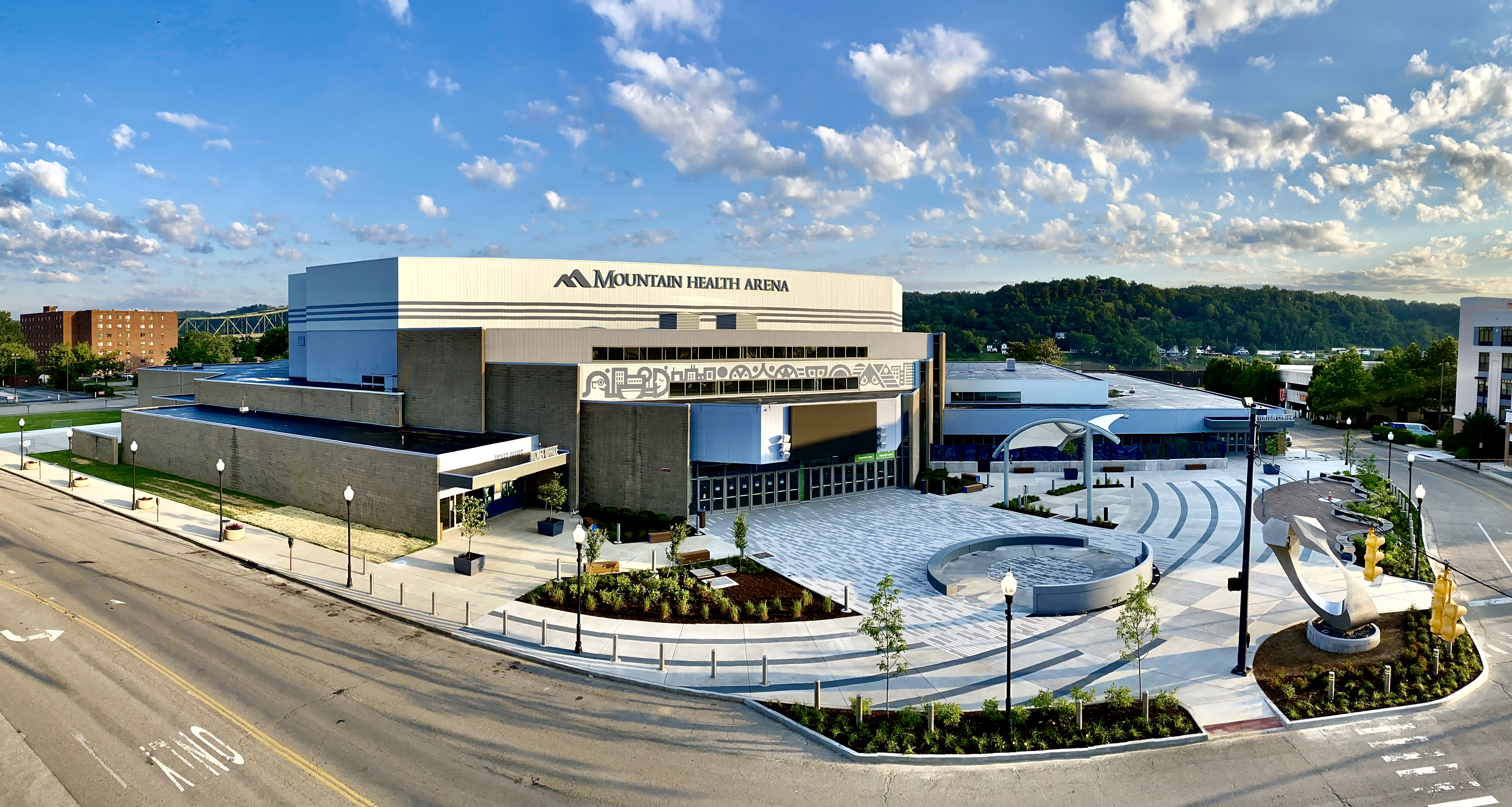
- The arena in 2021
- Interactive map of Marshall Health Network Arena
- Former names: Huntington Civic Center (1977–1993); Huntington Civic Arena (1993–2003); Big Sandy Superstore Arena (2003–2019); Mountain Health Arena (2019–2024)
- Location: One Civic Center Plaza; Huntington, West Virginia
- Coordinates: 38°25′20″N 82°26′49″W
- Owner: City of Huntington
- Operator: ASM Global
- Capacity: 7,500 (arena); 5,600 (indoor football)

Construction
- Opened: 1977
- Cost: $10.5 million ($55.8 million in 2025 dollars)

Tenants
- Huntington Blizzard (ECHL) (1993–2000); River Cities LocoMotives (NIFL) (2001); Huntington Heroes (AIFA) (2007–2008); Huntington Hammer (UIFL) (2011)

Website
- www.mhnarena.com

The Marshall Health Network Arena, originally known as the Huntington Civic Center, later as the Huntington Civic Arena and later, for sponsorship reasons as the Big Sandy Superstore Arena and Mountain Health Arena, is a municipal complex located in the downtown area of Huntington, West Virginia, one block west of Pullman Square. The arena consists of a 7,500-seat multi-purpose arena and an attached conference center.

It is home to numerous concerts and events and was the home of the Huntington Hammer of the Ultimate Indoor Football League for 2011.

== History ==
The $10.5 million Huntington Civic Center was completed in 1977 and was the largest in the state of West Virginia when it opened.

The new arena's first two shows were originally scheduled to feature Elvis Presley, but he died prior to the tour. As a result, the arena's actual opening show ended up being Heart.

At the time, the city felt it would not be able to accommodate Marshall University basketball, and the arena was thus built in a location that Marshall objected to, and used a design that was not sports-friendly. Marshall thus remained at the older Veterans Memorial Fieldhouse and then constructed its on-campus arena, the Cam Henderson Center, in 1981. At first, the building was very successful; however, the completion of a larger arena in nearby Charleston, and the 25-year delay in construction of what became Pullman Square caused the building to become a money-losing effort for the city. The city then decided to turn the building over to private management.

In the fall of 1997, $3.5 million was allocated in bonds to renovate the aging Civic Center; however, work did not begin until 2000. The 20-year-old facility had not been renovated or maintained since its initial construction. The interior and exterior were repainted in gray and maroon and the leaky roof was repaired. The conference area was expanded and the kitchen facility was upgraded.

From 1993 to 2000, the facility, by then called the Huntington Civic Arena, was home to the Huntington Blizzard of the ECHL. At this time the arena was modified to accommodate hockey and other team sports. In addition, the arena served as the home of the River Cities LocoMotives of the NIFL during their only season in 2001. The facility then served as the home for the American Indoor Football Association's Huntington Heroes. The team moved to the arena after spending their inaugural season in 2006 at the Veterans Memorial Fieldhouse.

The naming rights for the arena were purchased by Big Sandy Superstores, a regional chain of furniture and appliance stores. In 2019, after expiration of the naming rights agreement, the arena resumed its generic name for a short time before the naming rights were acquired by Mountain Health Network, the owners of Cabell Huntington Hospital and St. Mary's Medical Center. The arena name was changed to Marshall Health Network Arena in 2024, concurrent with Mountain Health Network being renamed Marshall Health Network.

== Notable appearances ==
List of notable performances or appearances held at the Marshall Health Arena.

Performer	Year(s)	Note
AC/DC	1978	
Def Leppard	2016	
George W. Bush	2004	
Heart	1977	
Evan Jenkins (politician)	2017	
Jim Justice	2017	
Kiss	2016 & 1979	
Patrick Morrisey	2017	
Bernie Sanders	2016	
Lynyrd Skynyrd	2018	
Donald Trump	2017	

== Gallery ==
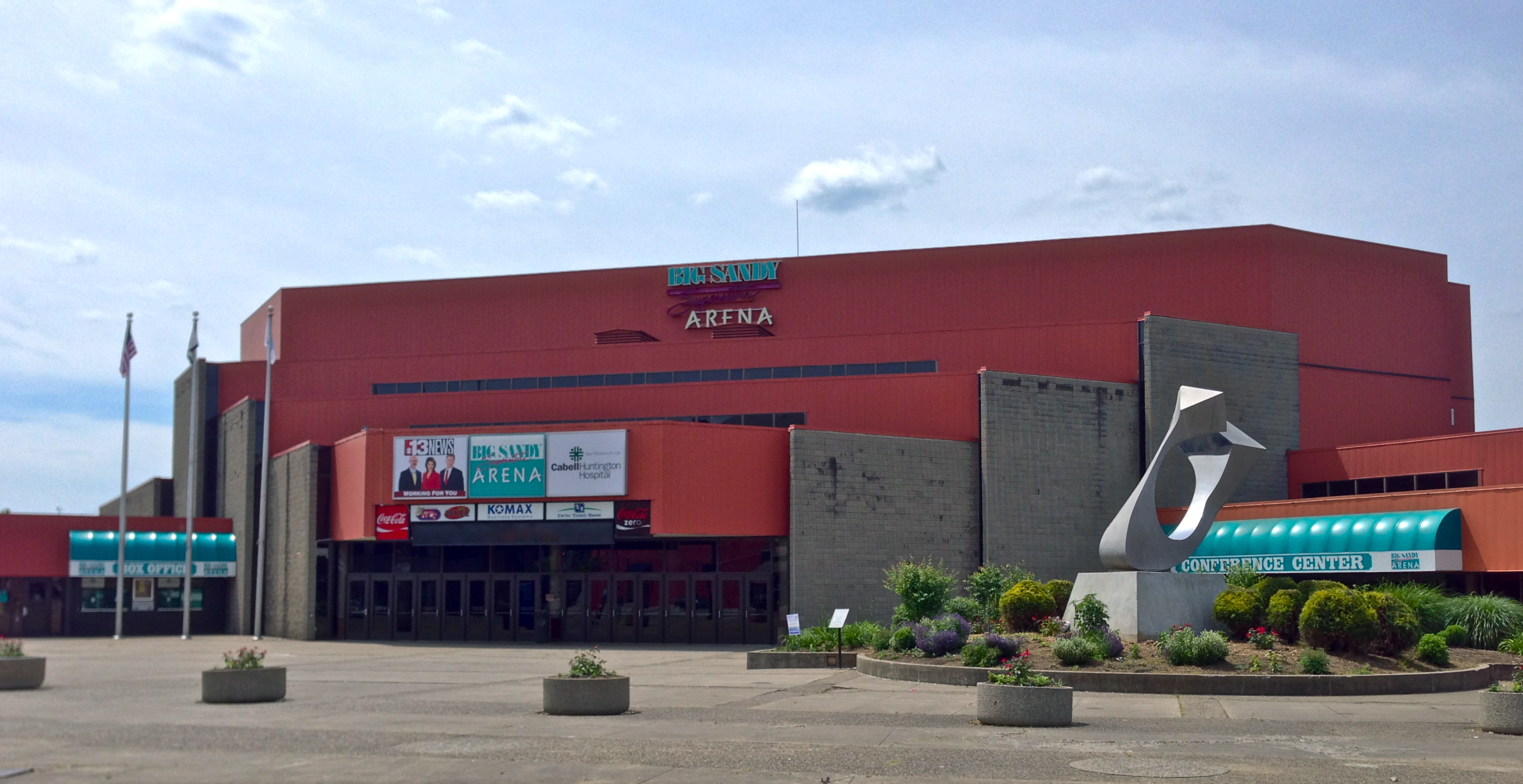
Exterior as Big Sandy Superstore Arena in 2013

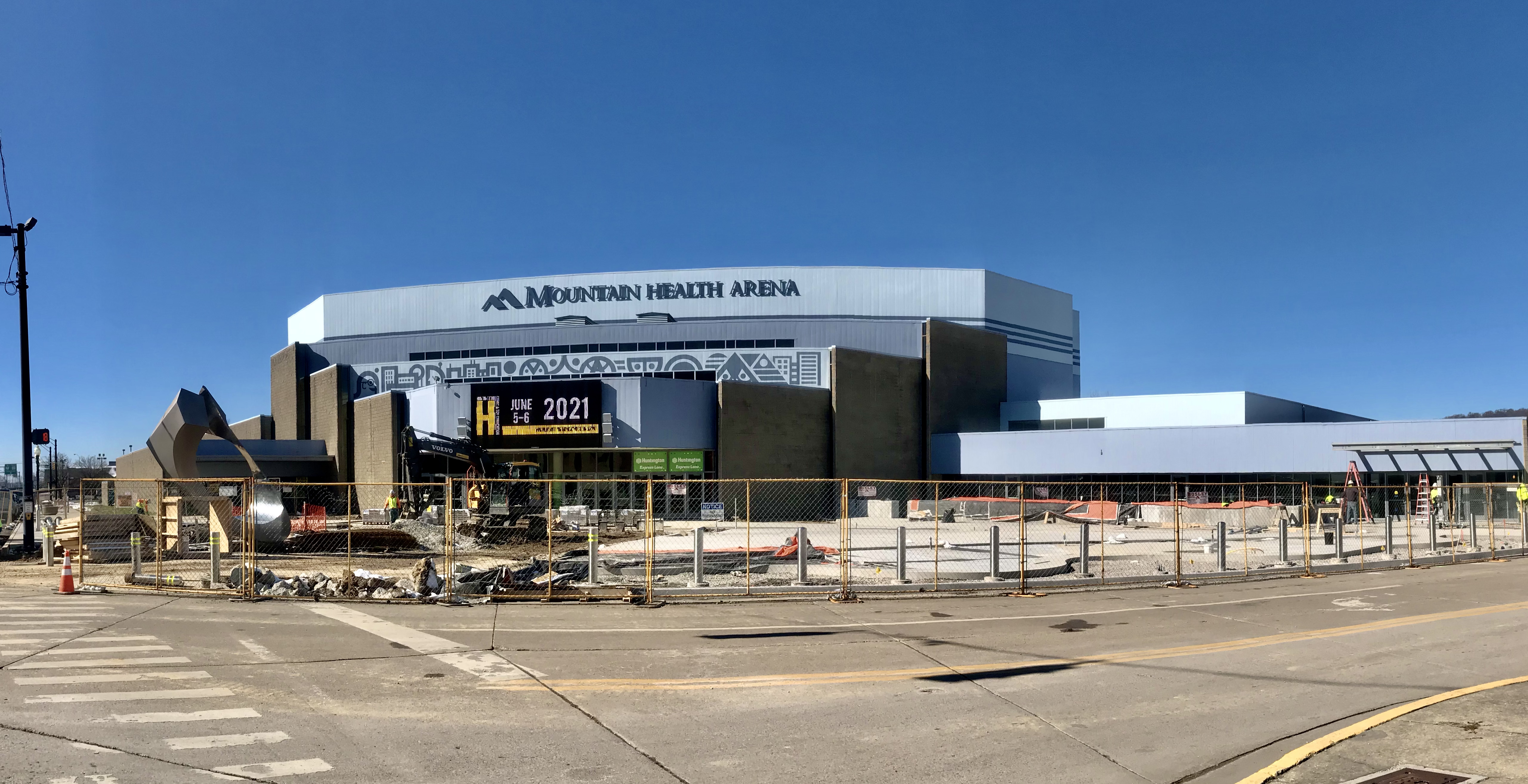
Exterior renovations as Mountain Health Arena in 2021

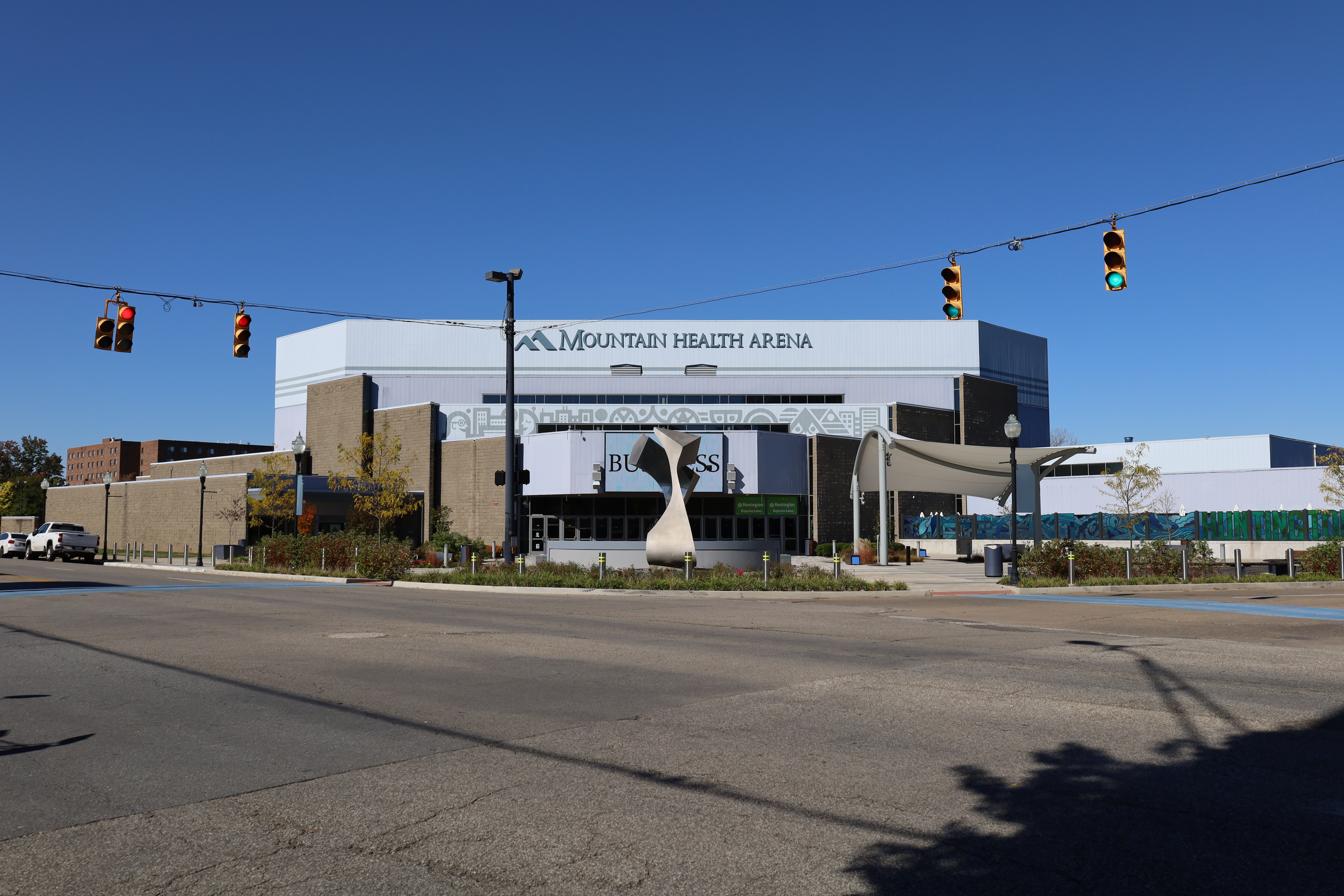
Exterior as Mountain Health Arena in 2023

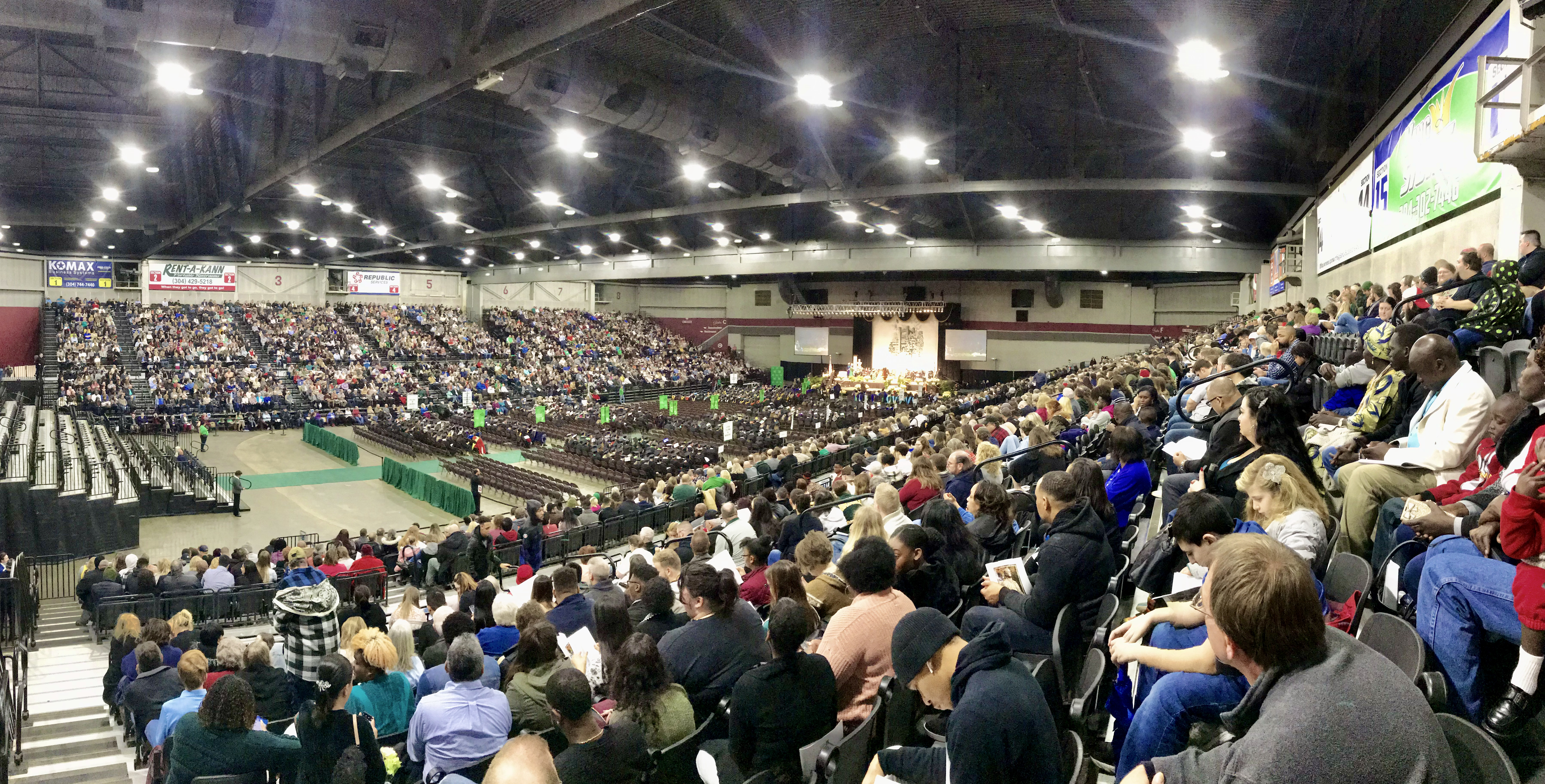
Interior as Mountain Health Arena in 2019
