= Canton Memorial Civic Center =

Arena in Ohio, United States

Coordinates: 40°48′28″N 81°22′23″W

- Canton Civic Center

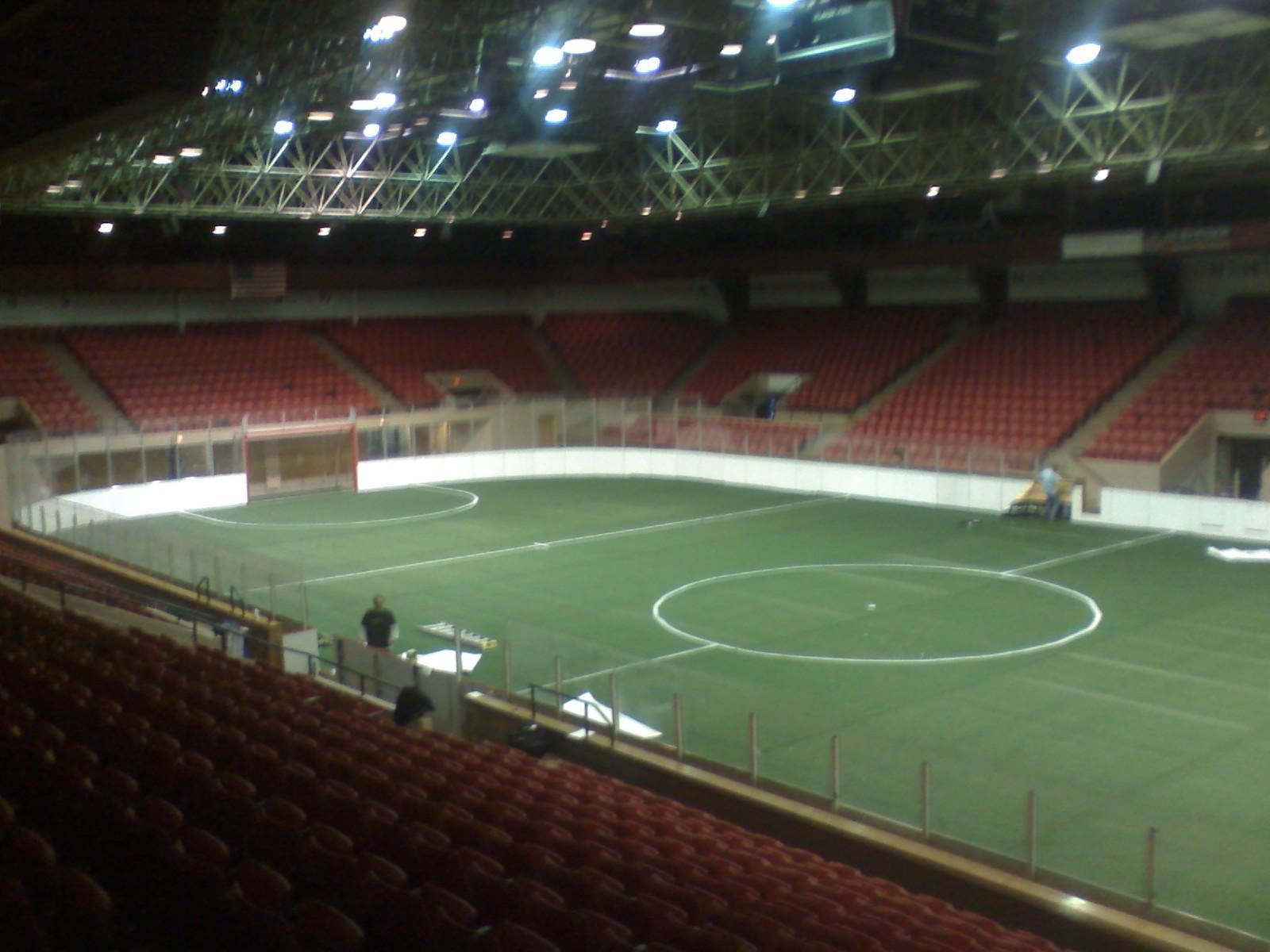
- Interactive map of Canton Memorial Civic Center
- Former names: Canton Memorial Auditorium (1951–1976)
- Address: 1101 Market Avenue North
- Location: Canton, Ohio
- Owner: City of Canton
- Operator: ASM Global
- Capacity: 5,200 (maximum); 4,000 (indoor football)

Construction
- Opened: 1951

Tenants
- Canton Invaders (AISA/NPSL) (1984–1996); Canton Legends (AIFL/AIFA) (2005–2008); Ohio Aviators (ABA) (2005–2006); Ohio Vortex (PASL) (2009–2012); Canton Charge (NBA G League) (2011–2020); Canton Cougars (UIFL) (2011)

The Canton Memorial Civic Center is a multi-purpose arena located in Canton, Ohio, United States.

Built in 1951, previous sports teams that have played at the center include the Canton Legends indoor football team, Canton Invaders indoor soccer team, Ohio Aviators of the American Basketball Association, and the Canton Charge of the NBA G League. The building is owned by the City of Canton and operated by ASM Global. Capacity is 5,200 in the arena, and up to 600 in the McKinley Room.

The facility has over the years hosted concerts, professional wrestling cards, political rallies, family shows, and features a number of annual Pro Football Hall of Fame festival events, the arena played host to Superstars on September 9, 1995, and Raw's New Fall Season Premiere on September 11, 1995, following that Superstars on September 16, 1995,
