= 2007 National Indoor Football League season =

2007 NIFL season
- League: National Indoor Football League
- Sport: indoor American football

Regular season
- Season champions: San Diego Shockwave

Playoffs
- Finals champions: San Diego Shockwave

NIFL seasons
- ← 2006

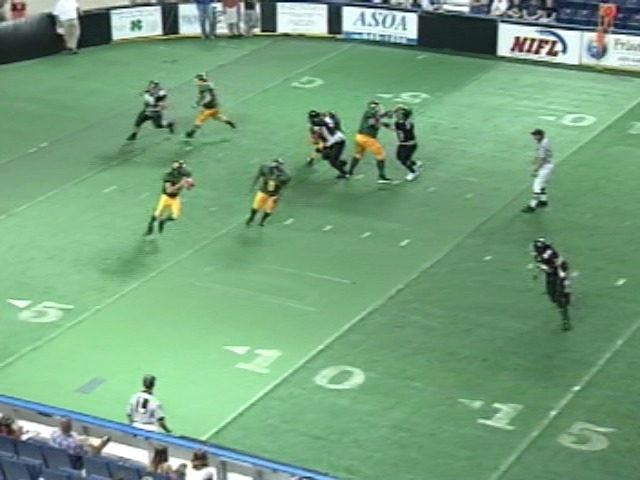
2007 San Antonio Steers vs Beaumont Drillers

The 2007 National Indoor Football League season was the seventh and final season of the National Indoor Football League (NIFL). The 2007 season was chaotic with teams folding and being suspended.

== Standings ==
Team	Overall			Conference		
Team	Wins	Losses	Percentage	Wins	Losses	Percentage
Atlantic Conference
Northern Division
Fayetteville Guard*	5	0	1.000	2	0	1.000
Greensboro Revolution	5	1	0.833	2	1	0.677
The Marshals	2	4	0.333	0	4	0.000
Southeastern Division
Columbia Stingers	1	4	0.200	0	0	0.000
Atlanta Thoroughbreds	0	3	0.000	0	0	0.000
Green Cove Lions	0	3	0.000	0	1	0.000
Florida Division
Fort Myers Tarpons	2	0	1.000	2	0	1.000
Miami Vice Squad	1	0	1.000	1	0	1.000
Port St. Lucie Mustangs	1	1	0.500	1	1	0.500
Palm Beach Waves	1	2	0.333	1	2	0.333
Sarasota Knights	1	2	0.500	0	2	0.000
Pacific Conference
Northern Division
Wyoming Cavalry*	4	0	1.000	3	0	1.000
Denver Aviators	1	1	0.500	1	1	0.500
Colorado Castle Rocks	0	1	0.000	0	1	0.000
Colorado Wild Riders	0	1	0.000	0	1	0.000
Pueblo Pistols	0	1	0.000	0	1	0.000
California Division
San Diego Shockwave	5	1	0.833	3	0	1.000
Tri-Valley Ranchers	1	0	1.000	1	0	1.000
San Bernardino Bucking Bulls	1	1	0.500	1	1	0.500
Pomona Cool Riders	0	2	0.000	0	2	0.000
Los Angeles Lynx	0	3	0.000	0	3	0.000
Southern Division
Beaumont Drillers	7	1	0.875	6	0	1.000
San Antonio Steers	2	4	0.333	2	4	0.333
Fort Worth Sixers	0	6	0.000	0	6	0.000

- team was suspended from league mid-season

== Postseason ==
The San Diego Shockwave was declared the league champion.
