= Rico Curtis =

American football player (born 1977)

No. 37
- Position: Fullback / Linebacker

Personal information
- Born: June 1, 1977 (age 49); San Bernardino, California, U.S.
- Listed height: 6 ft 1 in (1.85 m)
- Listed weight: 245 lb (111 kg)

Career information
- High school: Serra (San Diego, California)
- College: San Diego State (1995–1999)
- NFL draft: 2000: undrafted

Career history

Playing
- San Diego Chargers (2000)*; San Diego Riptide (2002–2004); San Diego Shockwave (2007)
- * Offseason or practice squad member only

Coaching
- San Diego Riptide (2005) Assistant coach

Operations
- San Diego Riptide (2005) Community outreach and player personnel coordinator

Awards and highlights
- NIFL champion (2007); First-team All-af2 (2002); No. 37 retired by the San Diego Riptide; First-team All-MWC (1999); 2× Second-team All-WAC Pacific Division (1997, 1998)

Ricardo Lee "Rico" Curtis II (born June 1, 1977) is an American former football fullback and linebacker. He played three seasons for the San Diego Riptide in the af2 from 2002 to 2004, breaking the single-season record for tackles in his first season and retiring as the league's all-time leading tackler. Curtis returned to play for the San Diego Shockwave in the National Indoor Football League (NIFL) in 2007, leading them to an NIFL title before the league folded. He played college football at San Diego State and signed with the San Diego Chargers of the National Football League (NFL) as an undrafted free agent in 2000 but did not play for them.

== Early life ==
Ricardo Lee Curtis II was born on June 1, 1977, in San Bernardino, California. His family moved to Orange, Texas, less than a year later, though they moved back to Southern California when he was in the tenth grade. Curtis began playing football at the age of four.

Curtis attended Serra High School in San Diego, where he played football as a defensive lineman. He set a school record with a 95-yard interception return for a touchdown in a game against St. Augustine High School. As a senior, Curtis earned first-team all-CIF San Diego Section Division II honors. He committed to play college football at San Diego State over offers from UCLA, Colorado State, and Washington State, in an effort to remain close to his family. San Diego State head coach Ted Tollner compared Curtis to Tim McDonald, a defensive back whom he had previously recruited to USC.

== College career ==
=== 1996 ===
Ahead of his freshman season at San Diego State in 1995, Curtis was identified by head coach Ted Tollner as one of four true freshmen who could see playing time. He was ultimately redshirted though, instead making his collegiate debut in the 1996 season opener against Idaho. After playing well in the first two games of the season, Curtis was named the starting free safety over Jason Moore ahead of their third game against Oklahoma. After three starting linebackers went down with injuries, Curtis slid into the nickelback (or "stud") role in the Aztecs' improvised 4–2–5 defense. He made his first career interception in their 31–21 win over Fresno State on November 23, picking off a pass by Jim Arellanes.

=== 1997 ===
Curtis was moved to the strong safety position ahead of his sophomore season in 1997, competing with junior Scott Auerbach for the starting spot. Auerbach started the season opener and Curtis took over for the remainder of the season. In the second game of the year, a defeat to Washington, Curtis led the Aztecs with 10 tackles. On September 27, he recorded 16 tackles and a forced fumble in their overtime loss to Air Force. On October 18, Curtis recorded his second career interception during their 20–17 overtime victory over UNLV; he also debuted at tight end in double tight end formations to provide extra blocking. Curtis earned second-team all-Western Athletic Conference (WAC) Pacific Division honors after recording 112 tackles and seven tackles-for-loss. He was also voted by his teammates as the special teams MVP and shared the Most Improved Player award with Jesus Reyes.

=== 1998 ===
On September 12, 1998, in a defeat to USC, Curtis intercepted Trojans quarterback Carson Palmer on a pass meant for tight end Antoine Harris. Ahead of their next game against Arizona, Curtis was moved to free safety to relieve Pete Balistreri, who was dealing with a surgically repaired knee. Curtis admittedly struggled at his new position in their defeat to Arizona. He improved the following week, helping the Aztecs beat Tulsa, 24–14, for their first win of the season. Curtis earned praise from head coach Ted Tollner for his performance, who said he had "the best secondary tackling [they] have had." On October 24, he recorded 11 tackles and an interception during a 21–20 overtime win over Utah. Curtis recorded another interception two weeks later during a 10–0 win over Fresno State, picking off Billy Volek in the end zone on a pass intended for Bulldogs running back Paris Gaines.

After an 0–3 start to the season, San Diego State rallied to win seven of their last eight regular season games and earned their first bowl bid since 1991. The team was matched up against North Carolina in the Las Vegas Bowl, the first game of the 1998 bowl season. "This is my first bowl game and I'm still kind of shocked," said Curtis. "This is so big to me. I hope I don't disappoint anybody." The Aztecs ultimately lost the game, 20–13. "Everyone played with so much heart, especially on defense," Curtis said afterwards. "I'm so proud of our team. They just made plays and we didn't." Curtis led the team with 90 tackles and three interceptions on the season, earning second-team all-WAC Pacific Division honors for the second year in a row.

=== 1999 ===
Ahead of his senior season in 1999, Curtis was moved back to his "natural position" of strong safety by the coaching staff. He was named to the Jim Thorpe Award watchlist and was one of five San Diego State players selected to the preseason all-Mountain West Conference team. Curtis recorded nine tackles, one sack, and one pass deflection in the season opener, a 41–12 win over Division I-AA opponent South Florida. On September 25, he recorded an interception in the Aztecs' 41–13 victory over Kansas, though he fumbled the ball back to the Jayhawks on the same play. The following week, he set a new career high with 14 tackles, including one for loss, in a 23–22 defeat to Air Force. (Note: Other sources credit Curtis with 17 tackles.) Ahead of the Aztecs' seventh game, a matchup against Colorado State, Curtis was moved yet again to free safety due to multiple injuries at the position. He recorded 12 tackles and an interception in their 17–10 victory over the Rams. Curtis also played linebacker towards the end of the season. He recovered a fumble in his final collegiate game, a 39–7 victory over Wyoming.

I'm just trying to relish the moment. It's hard right now. I can't believe it. It's been a great ride, with great coaches and great family. I'll miss it.

— Curtis reflecting on his career at San Diego State following his final collegiate game

Curtis finished the season with 83 tackles, two interceptions, and two sacks, earning first-team all-Mountain West honors. He was voted the Aztecs MVP by his teammates at the end-of-year awards banquet, as well as outstanding defensive back and defensive team captain. Curtis was also invited to the Hula Bowl postseason all-star game, where he played on the 'Aina team.

Curtis finished his career at San Diego State with 355 total tackles, which was at the time the second-highest mark in school history, behind only Whip Walton.

== Professional career ==
=== San Diego Chargers ===
After going unselected in the 2000 NFL draft, Curtis was signed by the San Diego Chargers as an undrafted free agent. However, he did not make the final roster, as he was cut in July.

=== San Diego Riptide ===
==== 2002 ====
Curtis signed with the San Diego Riptide, an expansion team in the af2, ahead of the 2002 af2 season. He was assigned to the Riptide in December 2001, along with former Oceanside High School star Jerry Garrett, becoming the first two players in team history. Curtis and Garrett were then presented at the team's introductory press conference on January 15, 2002.

Curtis played both offense and defense during his time in the af2 as the league played under ironman rules. He was a fullback on offense and a linebacker on defense. Curtis was a member of the starting lineup in the Riptide's home opener – a 49–43 overtime defeat to a fellow expansion team, the Bakersfield Blitz, on April 6. On April 20, he recorded 12.5 tackles in a 54–34 loss to the Tulsa Talons. Curtis was then named the af2 Built Ford Tough Man of the Week after a two-touchdown performance against the Louisville Fire on May 4 in which he scored on both sides of the ball: a 35-yard touchdown reception on offense and a 17-yard fumble returned for a touchdown on defense. Overall, he had three catches for 74 yards, along with 10.5 tackles and three pass deflections, in the 68–27 win. On June 8, Curtis scored three offensive touchdowns, including the game-winning touchdown catch from nine yards out with 26 seconds remaining, to lead the Riptide to a 46–43 victory over the Bakersfield Blitz. He also recorded a game-high 10 tackles and hauled in an interception on defense, earning af2 Ironman of the Week honors for his performance. On July 20, Curtis made eight tackles during a 45–42 loss to the Arkansas Twisters, bringing his season total to 118.5 and breaking the af2 single-season record for tackles, which was set by Cornelius Coe in 2000. In the regular season finale the following week, he caught a 20-yard touchdown and made two more tackles before suffering an injury in their 58–41 loss to the Quad City Steamwheelers, extending his single-season record to 120.5 tackles. Curtis also finished the year with 13 pass breakups, two interceptions, four forced fumbles, and three fumble recoveries, as well as nine offensive touchdowns.

The Riptide finished their inaugural season with a 7–9 record. The team faced the Bakersfield Blitz in the first round of the playoffs, where Curtis caught a touchdown and helped San Diego to a 40–27 victory. However, San Diego was defeated in the next round by the Peoria Pirates. Curtis earned first-team all-af2 honors and was selected by his teammates as the Riptide Most Valuable Player and Ironman of the Year. He was also named a Professional Star of the Month for August by the San Diego Hall of Champions, along with John Dutton, Morris Hatalsky, Chris Riley, and Joel Tudor.

==== 2003 ====
Curtis opened the 2003 season listed at 6 ft 1 in (1.85 m), 245 lb (111 kg). On May 3, he scored a one-yard touchdown run in a 49–35 win over the Bakersfield Blitz. Through the first 12 games of the season, Curtis recorded just 19 solo tackles and 18 assists. In the season finale on July 25, he scored a two-yard game-winning touchdown run with 24 seconds left to lead the Riptide to a 31–28 victory over the Green Bay Blizzard. However, San Diego finished the season with a 6–10 record and failed to qualify for the playoffs.

==== 2004 ====
Curtis entered his third year in the af2 under a new head coach, as the Riptide hired Mouse Davis to replace Cree Morris ahead of the 2004 season. "We're being put in a position to win," said Curtis of the change. "I'm the same guy no matter who the coach is, but I'm going to be playing as hard as I can because I know this guy has the background – he's been there. It's going to be a lot easier to trust what he says." On April 23, Curtis caught a 25-yard touchdown pass and scored again on a fumble recovery in a 59–34 win over the Central Valley Coyotes. On May 22, he recorded an interception in a 62–52 win over the Quad City Steamwheelers. On July 17, Curtis recovered a fumble in the end zone for a touchdown in a 50–34 win over the Green Bay Blizzard. The Riptide finished with an 8–8 record, tying for second place in the West Division.

In April 2005, Curtis announced his retirement as a player after three seasons with the Riptide, at the same time joining the team's staff as the community outreach and player personnel coordinator and assistant coach. In their press release, the team called Curtis "the most recognizable player to develop from the Riptide franchise." His #37 jersey was retired by the team during halftime ceremonies of a game against the Amarillo Dusters, becoming the first retired number in franchise history.

=== San Diego Shockwave ===
Curtis signed with the San Diego Shockwave, an expansion team in the National Indoor Football League (NIFL), ahead of the 2007 NIFL season. He helped the team to a 56–9 home win over the Los Angeles Lynx in the season opener. In the fourth quarter of the game, Curtis recovered a fumble and returned it five yards for a touchdown. The Shockwave finished the dysfunctional and chaotic 2007 season with a league-best 10–1 record, but was left out of the independently-organized Indoor Football Championship Bowl between the Fayetteville Guard and the Wyoming Cavalry.

On March 28, 2022, Curtis' #37 jersey was retired by the San Diego Strike Force of the Indoor Football League (IFL) during their home opener at Pechanga Arena – the same building where he played for the Riptide.

== Personal life ==
Curtis majored in psychology at San Diego State, and both of his parents attended every home and away game during his junior and senior seasons. His cousin, Kevin Smith, played cornerback for the Dallas Cowboys.

== See also ==
- San Diego State Aztecs football statistical leaders
