= 2006 National Indoor Football League season =

2006 NIFL season
- League: National Indoor Football League
- Sport: indoor American football

Regular season
- Season champions: Fayetteville Guard

Playoffs
- Atlantic champions: Fayetteville Guard
- Atlantic runners-up: RiverCity Rage
- Pacific champions: Billings Outlaws
- Pacific runners-up: Rapid City Flying Aces

Indoor Bowl VI
- Champions: Billings Outlaws
- Runners-up: Fayetteville Guard

NIFL seasons
- ← 2005 2007 →

The 2006 National Indoor Football League season was the fifth season of the National Indoor Football League (NIFL). The league champions were the Billings Outlaws, who defeated the Fayetteville Guard in Indoor Bowl VI.

== Standings ==
Team	Overall			Conference		
Team	Wins	Losses	Percentage	Wins	Losses	Percentage
Atlantic Conference
Eastern Division
Fayetteville Guard	13	1	0.929	6	0	1.000
Montgomery Maulers	7	7	0.500	3	3	0.500
Charleston Sandsharks	7	7	0.500	1	4	0.250
Greensboro Revolution	5	9	0.357	1	5	0.200
Southern Division
Lakeland Thunderbolts	12	2	0.857	4	1	0.800
Osceola Outlaws	8	6	0.571	1	3	0.333
Florida Frenzy	5	9	0.357	1	3	0.333
West Palm Beach Phantoms	1	5	0.200	1	1	0.500
Northern Division
RiverCity Rage	13	1	0.929	6	0	1.000
Cincinnati Marshals	8	6	0.571	3	3	0.500
Dayton Bulldogs	3	11	0.500	2	3	0.400
Tennessee River Sharks	3	11	0.214	1	4	0.200
Pacific Conference
Northern Division
Billings Outlaws	13	1	0.929	4	1	0.750
Tri-Cities Fever	9	5	0.643	3	2	0.600
Big Sky Thunder	2	12	0.143	0	4	0.000
Western Division
Rapid City Flying Aces	11	3	0.786	5	1	0.833
Wyoming Cavalry	8	6	0.571	3	2	0.600
Lincoln Capitols/St. Joe Cyclones	0	14	0.000	0	5	0.000
Southern Division
Katy Copperheads	11	3	0.786	6	1	0.857
Beaumont Drillers	8	6	0.571	6	2	0.750
Arkansas Stars	6	8	0.429	1	4	0.250
Twin City Gators	0	14	0.000	0	6	0.000

- Green indicates clinched playoff berth
- Purple indicates division champion
- Grey indicates best conference record

== Playoffs ==
St. Joseph, Missouri
5	Cincinnati	2
5	Cincinnati	30
4	Osceola	0	Fayetteville, North Carolina
2	RiverCity	48
Atlantic Conference
Lakeland, Florida	2	RiverCity	70
Fayetteville, North Carolina
1	Fayetteville	72
6	Montgomery	62	Atlantic Conference Championship
3	Lakeland	18
3	Lakeland	70	Billings, Montana
1	Fayetteville	44
Wild Card playoffs
Divisional playoffs
Katy, Texas	A1	Fayetteville	44
Rapid City, South Dakota
P1	Billings	59
6	Beaumont	21	Indoor Bowl VI
3	Katy	38
3	Katy	55	Billings, Montana
2	Rapid City	60
Pacific Conference
Kennewick, Washington	2	Rapid City	54
Billings, Montana
1	Billings	62
5	Wyoming	20	Pacific Conference Championship
4	Tri-Cities	21
4	Tri-Cities	45
1	Billings	48

* – forfeit

== See also ==
- List of NIFL seasons
