= Buddy Brown (musician) =

American country music singer-songwriter

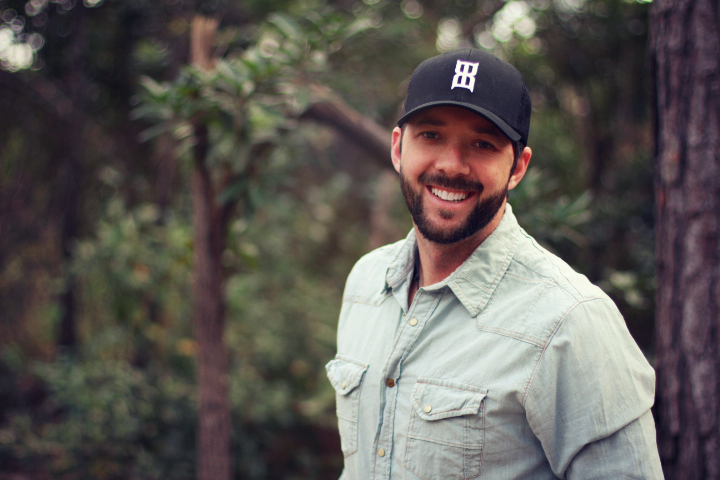
- Buddy Brown, 2016

Background information
- Born: Buddy Brown; May 12, 1982 (age 44); Jackson, Mississippi, U.S.
- Genres: Country
- Occupations: Singer; songwriter
- Instruments: Vocals; guitar
- Years active: 2010–present
- Label: Buddy Brown Music

Buddy Brown is an American country music singer-songwriter who first achieved prominence with a number of viral videos on YouTube.

== Early life ==
Brown was born on May 12, 1982, in Madison, Mississippi, a suburb of Jackson. When Brown was nine years old, his family decided to relocate to Orlando, Florida for his father's career. In 2005, he graduated from Mississippi State with a degree in Psychology.

== Career ==
On October 13, 2009, he released a cover of Easton Corbin's "A Little More Country Than That" that went viral. A year later, he opened up for country singer John Anderson in Wildwood, Florida.

On July 4, 2012, he released his first album titled Mason Jar. His fan base pushed his first full-length CD to No. 34 on the iTunes country chart without a record deal. March 11, 2014, he released a self-titled EP, Buddy Brown. On October 14, 2014, Buddy released his second EP, Keepin' It Country. This EP reached No. 12 on the iTunes charts. In January 2014, Billboard put Keepin' It Country on their Heat Seekers Albums list. USA Today published a story on Brown, labeling him as a "YouTube Sensation." His single "Takin' You Huntin'" landed him a spot on the front page and an online feature in The Clarion-Ledger.

On April 21, 2015, he released his third EP, Hometown Anthems. This EP landed at No. 28 on iTunes. He joined artists Chase Rice and Dee Jay Silver in May of that year to perform at the NASCAR Talladega Motor Speedway. He previously performed for more than 10,000 in a pre-race concert at Talladega in May 2013. On July 24–25, 2015, he performed at Boo Fest, a charity golf tournament. In the fall of 2015, Brown joined the College Town Throw Down Tour lineup, which included Justin Moore, Jon Pardi, Easton Corbin, Joe Nichols and Brothers Osborne. He later opened up for Pardi at the Clay County Fairgrounds in Green Cove Springs, Florida in October 2015. On July 22, 2016, he opened for Pardi again at the Muscatine County Fair.

In February 2016, Brown released his fourth EP, Hurricane Stomp. The EP peaked at No. 16 on iTunes-US and No. 8 in Canada. The EP was featured on New Artist Spotlight and landed on Billboard's sales chart as one of the two top independent releases of the week. Brown released another independent EP, I Call BS on That, on October 7, 2016. The EP debuted at No. 1 on the iTunes Top Country Album chart and landed at No. 22 on the Billboard Album chart. The live announcement video of I Call BS on That reached 10.9 Million views on Facebook. After releasing the EP, Brown gained 18,000 fans in just one week. The acoustic video of the track had 3.1 million views and 75,000 shares. Brown currently has over 138 million views of his YouTube videos. In addition to his YouTube success, Brown has over 630,000 social media followers. In 2023, he made a song about Kamala Harris getting run over by a reindeer.

== Discography ==
=== Extended plays ===
| Title | Details | Peak chart positions | |
| Title | Details | US Country | US Heat |
|---|---|---|---|
| From the Tailgate to the Mainstage | Release date: March 11, 2014; Label: Buddy Brown Music; Formats: CD, music download | — | — |
| Keepin’ It Country | Release date: October 14, 2014; Label: Buddy Brown Music; Formats: CD, music download | — | 49 |
| Hometown Anthems | Release date: April 21, 2015; Label: Buddy Brown Music; Formats: CD, music download | — | — |
| Hurricane Stomp | Release date: February 26, 2016; Label: Buddy Brown Music; Formats: CD, music download | — | — |
| I Call BS on That | Release date: October 7, 2016; Label: Buddy Brown Music; Formats: CD, music download | 22 | 9 |
| Red Like Reagan | Release date: June 23, 2017; Label: Buddy Brown Music; Formats: CD, music download | — | — |
| Just Sayin' | Release date: March 30, 2018; Label: Buddy Brown Music; Formats: CD, music download | — | — |
"—" denotes releases that did not chart

=== Albums ===
| Title | Details |
|---|---|
| Mason Jar | Release date: July 4, 2012; Label: Buddy Brown Music; Formats: CD, music download |
| Deep South | Release date: March 22, 2019; Label: Buddy Brown Music; Formats: CD, music download |
| Patriot | Release date: March 13, 2020; Label: Buddy Brown Music; Formats: CD, music download |
| American Savage | Release date: March 5, 2021; Label: Buddy Brown Music; Formats: CD, music download |
| The Old Sound | Release date: April 1, 2022; Label: Buddy Brown Music; Formats: CD, music download |
| Truck Sessions | Release date: May 12, 2023; Label: Buddy Brown Music; Formats: CD, music download |
