= Greensboro Complex =

Arena in North Carolina, United States

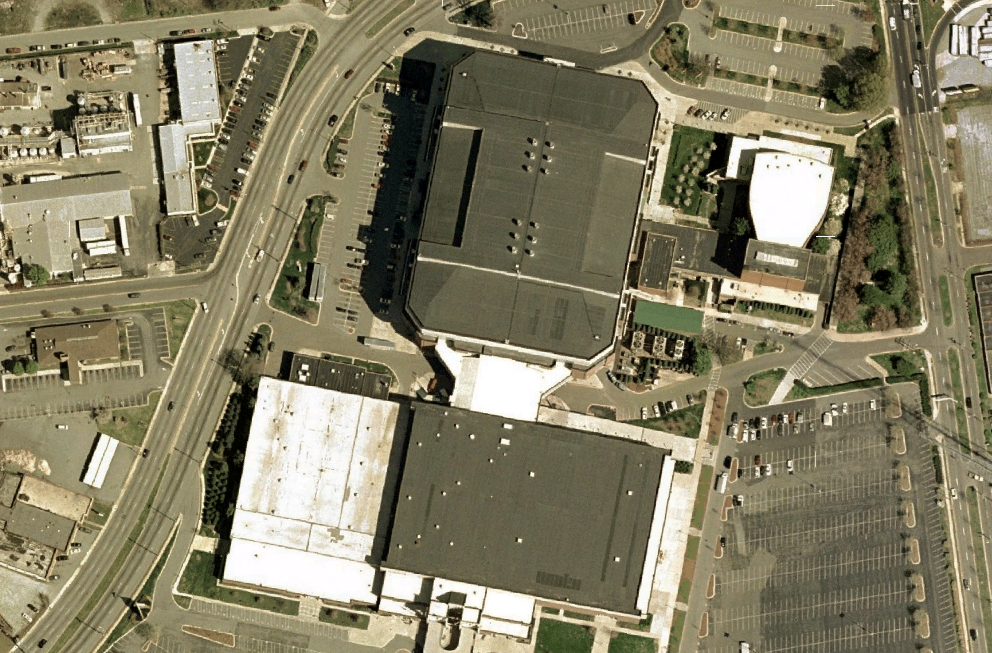

- Location within North Carolina Location within the United States
- Former names: Greensboro Coliseum Complex (1959–2024)
- Address: 1921 West Gate City Boulevard
- Location: Greensboro, North Carolina, U.S.
- Coordinates: 36°3′35″N 79°49′32″W
- Owner: City of Greensboro
- Operator: Oak View Group
- Capacity: 35,000+

Construction
- Groundbreaking: January 1958
- Opened: October 29, 1959
- Renovated: 1994, 2005, 2013, 2016
- Expanded: 1972, 1993, 2003, 2011
- Cost: US$4.5 million (1959) ($50.2 million in 2025 dollars) $63 million (1993 Expansion)
- Architect: FABRAP

Tenants
- Greensboro Generals (EHL/SHL) (1959–1975); Wake Forest Demon Deacons (NCAA) (1959–1989); Carolina Cougars (ABA) (1969–1974); Greensboro Monarchs (ECHL) (1989–1995); Greensboro City Gaters (GBA) (1991–1992); Carolina Monarchs (AHL) (1995–1997); Carolina Hurricanes (NHL) (1997–1999); Greensboro Generals (ECHL) (1999–2004); Greensboro Prowlers (AF2) (2000–2003); Greensboro Revolution (NIFL) (2006–2007); UNC Greensboro Spartans (NCAA) (2009–present); Greensboro Swarm (NBAGL) (2016–present); Carolina Cobras (NAL) (2018–present); Carolina Cowboys (PBR) (2023–present); Greensboro Gargoyles (ECHL) (2025–present); Greensboro Groove (UpShot League) (2026)

Website
- gsocomplex.com

The Greensboro Complex, formerly known as the Greensboro Coliseum Complex, is an entertainment and sports complex located in Greensboro, North Carolina, United States. Opened in 1959, the complex holds eight venues that includes an amphitheater, arena, aquatic center, banquet hall, convention center, museum, theatre and an indoor pavilion. It is the home of the UNC Greensboro Spartans men's basketball team, the Greensboro Swarm of the NBA G League, the Carolina Cobras of the National Arena League, the Greensboro Gargoyles of the East Coast Hockey League (ECHL), as well as the Atlantic Coast Conference (ACC) with their men's and women's basketball tournaments.

It has hosted the ACC men's tournament twenty-three times since 1967 and the ACC women's tournament twelve times since 2000. Other notable sporting events include the National Collegiate Athletic Association (NCAA) Division I men's basketball tournament Final Four in 1974 and the East Regionals in 1976, 1979 and 1998. More recently, the Coliseum has hosted the U.S. Figure Skating Championships in 2011, 2015 and 2020.

It is also the former home of several professional hockey teams including the Greensboro Generals and Greensboro Monarchs of the ECHL and the National Hockey League's Carolina Hurricanes.

The complex has hosted the 'Central Carolina Fair' since 1999.

== History ==
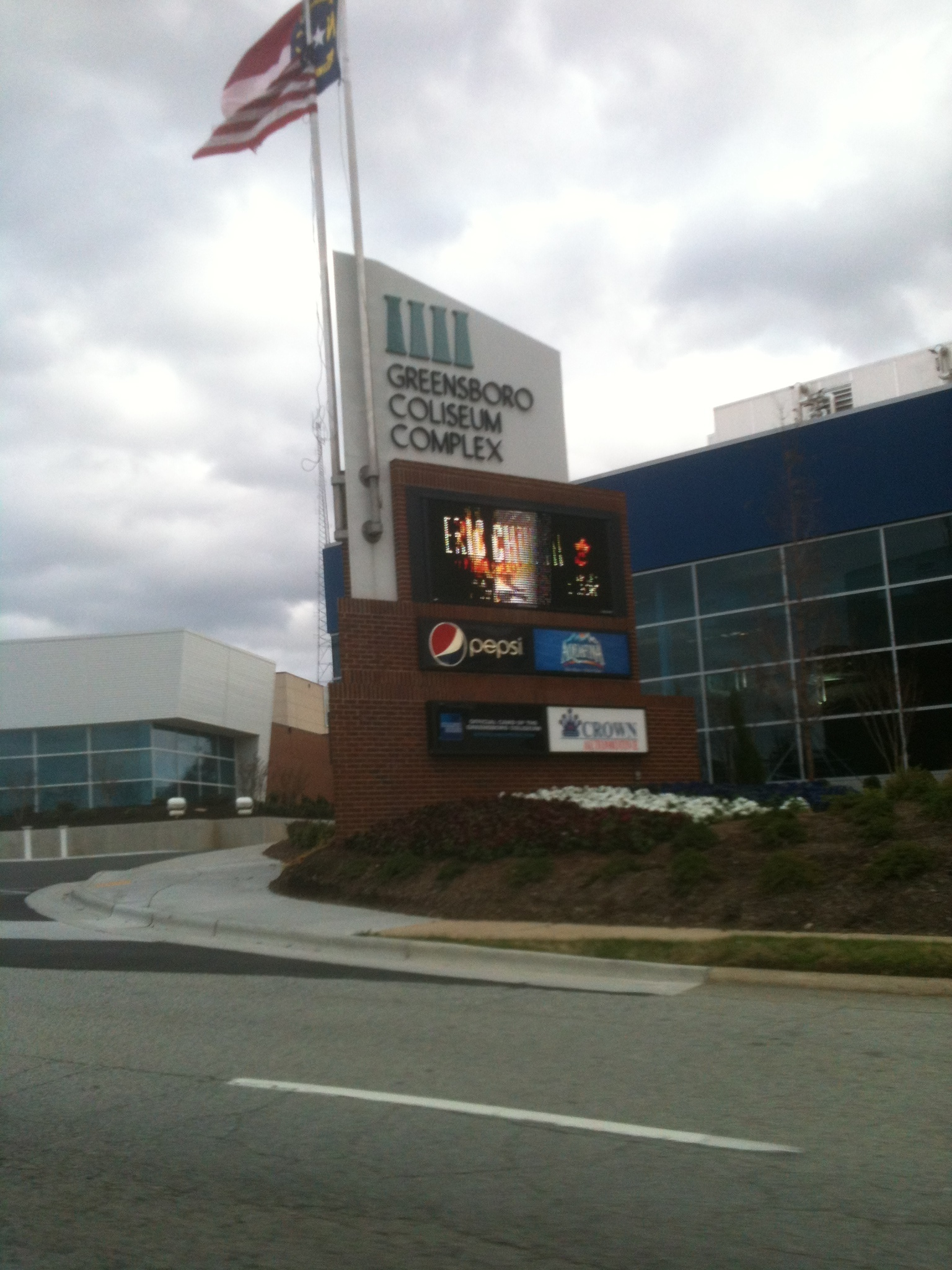
Main entrance of the complex in 2016

The complex was first proposed in 1944 by the city's mayor. The idea was to create a war memorial to honor veterans of World War I and World War II. The building was approved by city officials in 1956, followed by a groundbreaking in January 1958. With its opening in 1959, the complex held four venues: War Memorial Auditorium, Town Hall Auditorium, The Blue Room and the Greensboro Coliseum. The complex opened on October 29, 1959, for historic show, "Holiday on Ice". Shortly after its opening, the Coliseum began to scout for a hockey team. Partnering with the EHL, the city formed the "Greensboro Generals". The team's first match was November 11, 1959, against the Washington Presidents. The Generals won the game 4–1. The Generals would go on to win the EHL championships.

Over the years, the complex hosted several conventions, sporting and musical events. The Coliseum was part-time home of the Carolina Cougars of the American Basketball Association from 1969 to 1974 after the Houston Mavericks moved to North Carolina in 1969. The Cougars were a "regional franchise," splitting their "home" games between Charlotte (Bojangles Coliseum), Greensboro (Greensboro Coliseum), Winston-Salem Memorial Coliseum and Raleigh (Dorton Arena and Reynolds Coliseum). Hall of Fame Coach Larry Brown began his coaching career with the Cougars in 1972. Billy Cunningham was the ABA MVP for the Cougars in the 1972–73 season. Despite strong fan support the costs of running a team based in multiple cities proved insurmountable; the Cougars were sold and moved to St. Louis as the Spirits in 1974, one of two franchises to purposefully contract for a payout as part of the ABA–NBA merger in 1976.

To meet demands, the Coliseum expanded its seating to 15,000 in 1972. Six years later, the complex expanded to include an exhibition center, known at the time as the Greensboro Coliseum Complex Exhibition Building (shortened to Exhibition Building). The building's first event was "Super Flea", a flea market for the Triad area. In 1991, the Coliseum's manager (Jim Evans) proposed an additional expansion of the complex. This expansion would raise the seating capacity of the Coliseum an additional 8,000 (adding a third tier) to 23,000; however, this capacity would later be lowered to around 20,000 after renovations in the late 2010s. It would also see The Blue Room demolished to make way for a small arena in the Exhibition Hall (now called the Special Events Center).

The venue reopened on December 28, 1993, for the "Reunion Classic", a men's basketball game between the UCLA Bruins and NC State Wolfpack. This game was met with controversy as the Coliseum was not fully complete at the time of the game. City officials paid $200,000 to have firefighters on stand by during the game. The Coliseum and the newly expanded exhibition hall did not meet state and city building codes nor fire regulations, because of incomplete construction. Additionally, the Coliseum did not hold the permits to host the event. This decision resulted in city council firing both the Coliseum manager and its contractors, Huber, Hunt and Nichols, Inc. (known for the Spectrum Center, BB&T Center and the PPG Paints Arena). It was later determined it would take an additional ten months to have the complex comply with regulations. The city added an additional $20 million to the budget to renovate the Coliseum and the auditorium.

Additional expansion came in 2003 when the complex added Novant Health Fieldhouse (formerly the GCC Pavilion). Two years later, the complex renovated the old Town Hall Auditorium into the smaller Odeon Theatre. In 2011, the complex added three additional venues: the White Oak Amphitheatre, the Greensboro Aquatic Center and the ACC Hall of Champions. Since its opening, the complex has been visited by nearly 57 million people and hosts over 800 events per year. In September 2014, the War Memorial Auditorium closed its doors.

Oak View Group became the operator of the Complex on July 1, 2024, after winning a bid to take over management of the Complex from the City of Greensboro in early 2024. In October 2024, the City of Greensboro and Oak View Group made a 10-year naming rights deal with First Horizon Bank to rename the coliseum the First Horizon Coliseum. This deal does not affect the other venues at the complex.

== Facilities ==
Seating capacity
First Horizon Coliseum	22,000
White Oak Amphitheatre	7,061
Novant Health Fieldhouse	2,118
Special Events Center (East Wing)	5,100
Odeon Theatre	300
Greensboro Aquatic Center	2,500
The Terrace	800

=== First Horizon Coliseum ===
One of the original four buildings of the complex, the Coliseum (also called Coliseum Arena) is one of the oldest buildings on the property. Construction began on the venue in 1958 and was completed in September 1959. Known originally as the "Greensboro Memorial Coliseum" (until 1980), the arena hosted its first event on October 29, 1959. At the time, the Coliseum held 7,100 seats, becoming one of the largest arenas on the East Coast.

Through the years, the Coliseum has hosted several sporting events, most notably basketball (see below). The Coliseum has also hosted concerts for over 40 years. During the 1960s and 1970s, the Coliseum was frequented by rock and R&B performers. The first major concert held at the Coliseum was by the Monkees. Elvis Presley played a concert at the Coliseum on April 14, 1972; the footage was used for his final film, entitled Elvis on Tour. Presley performed the Coliseum again on April 21, 1977, one of the final venues of his tour, before his death on August 16. Casting Crowns recorded their live album, entitled Until the Whole World Hears... Live, at the Coliseum on April 24, 2010. Rock band Phish set the attendance record for a concert at the Coliseum on March 1, 2003, with 23,642 attendees.

The arena has also hosted WJMH's SuperJam from 1997 to 2014. The music festival has featured prominent artists in the hip hop community including LL Cool J, Soulja Boy, Ludacris, Ja Rule, Plies, Nas, Lil Jon & the East Side Boyz, Travis Porter and the Ying Yang Twins.

The Coliseum was also the site of auditions for the fifth season of American Idol on October 3, 2005. Between July 8 and 10, 2012, it played host to the Greensboro audition stages in the second season of the Fox singer search program The X Factor. In October 2024, the coliseum officially changed its name to the First Horizon Coliseum after a 10-year naming deal with First Horizon Bank.

=== War Memorial Auditorium ===
One of the original four buildings of the complex, the War Memorial Auditorium was one of the oldest buildings on the property, until it was closed in 2014. Along with the original concept, the venue opened in 1959 to house performing arts events. Playing predominantly to an African-American audience, the auditorium became a notable venue on the Chitlin' Circuit. James Brown, Ray Charles and Aretha Franklin were among the many performers who played the auditorium during the 1960s. The Rolling Stones played the auditorium during the band's 1965 North American Tour on November 12, 1965. The venue was primarily used for town meetings, theatrical events, religious meetings and concerts. Presidential candidate Barack Obama held a town hall meeting on March 26, 2008, to a full house. Guilford County native Fantasia Barrino gave her first concert, in her home state, during her Back to Me Tour on November 18, 2010.

The auditorium was torn down in October 2014, and the site was replaced with a premium parking lot. It's replacement the Steven Tanger Center for the Performing Arts, opened in downtown in September 2021. A closing ceremony took place September 4. An O'Jays concert September 5 was the last event, and items from the auditorium were auctioned off the next week.

=== Special Events Center ===
Originally known as the "Exhibition Building", the exhibition center opened in 1978. Its purpose was to host business conferences and conventions. The venue was primarily used by "Super Flea", the flea market for the Triad area. In 1993, the center was expanded, converting the old Blue Room into a mid-sized arena known as "Hall C" or the "East Wing". In its current state, the 167,000-square-foot (15,500 m^{2}) center "includes three exhibition halls, a 4,500-seat mini-arena and eight meeting rooms". The arena is often used for musical performances during the Central Carolina Fair. It is also utilized by Greensboro College men's and women's basketball home games. Other sporting events include boxing and UFC matches. The arena will often host concerts and comedy shows.

=== Odeon Theatre ===
Opening in 1958 as the "Town Hall Auditorium", the Odeon Theatre is a small venue primarily used for community events. The original auditorium housed 1,000 seats. In 2004, the auditorium was converted to the smaller theatre and reopened in March 2005.

=== White Oak Amphitheatre ===
The newest addition to the complex, the White Oak Amphitheatre is the first outdoor venue for the Triad area. The venue was originally proposed in 2007 along with the aquatic center. The city purchased the nearby Canada Dry bottling plant to allow space for the amphitheatre. Construction began in 2010 and was completed in June 2011. The first concert for the venue was by The Beach Boys on June 5, 2011, to a crowd of 4,000 spectators. The amphitheatre is expected to operate from April to October, hosting community, comedy and musical events. The project cost $946,000 to construct.

While campaigning for the 2016 United States presidential election, Barack Obama held a rally here for Hillary Clinton on October 11, 2016, and Donald Trump held a rally on October 14, 2016.

=== Novant Health Fieldhouse ===
The Novant Health Fieldhouse is a standalone exhibition hall adjacent to the Special Events Center. The 30,000-square-foot (2,800 m^{2}) space opened in March 2003 as the "GCC Pavilion". The project was designed by SKA Consulting Engineers. In 2016, the Novant Health Fieldhouse became the home of the Greensboro Swarm, the NBA Development League (later called the NBA G League) affiliate of the Charlotte Hornets. To accommodate the team, the Novant Health Fieldhouse was renovated with a permanent roof, locker room and seating for 2,118. In December 2022, the Greensboro Swarm extended its lease with the Greensboro Coliseum Complex and entered into a naming rights partnership with Novant Health, with the official name of the venue changing to Novant Health Fieldhouse at the Greensboro Coliseum Complex.

=== Greensboro Aquatic Center ===
Another expansion project for the complex is the new aquatic center. The center features three main pools including a warm-up and training pool. The main pool is used for events by nearby high schools, colleges and USA Swimming events, and can hold eight 50-meter (long-course) lanes or 20 short-course competition lanes plus a warm-up pool. The complex also includes springboard and platform diving facilities and hosts meets for USA Diving. The facility has an available classroom and a 24-foot-by-19-foot video screen, as well as a concessions stand and swim store. The venue hosts events in competitive swimming and diving, synchronized swimming and water polo up through USA National competition levels. It also hosts the National Mermaid Convention. Paid parking is available. The project began in 2010 along with the amphitheatre and cost $18.8 million to build. The City of Greensboro provided a live cam feed to watch the progress of the construction. The venue has hosted the 2012 U.S. Masters Swimming Spring National Championship, the 2015 NCAA Division I women's swimming and diving championships, and other tournaments as well.

=== ACC Hall of Champions ===
To commemorate its legacy with the ACC tournaments, the complex opened a museum in 2011 to show the history of the ACC. The venue celebrates the past, present and future of the ACC. It features numerous exhibits including an interactive broadcast booth, memorabilia, a video globe and school mascots.

=== The Terrace ===
Opened in March 2011, The Terrace is one of new expansions for the complex. Its main purpose is a banquet hall and will be used for speaking events as well as weddings. The Terrace is an indoor venue located in between the auditorium and Coliseum.

== Sports ==
Tenants
Greensboro Gargoyles	ECHL	2025–present
Carolina Cowboys	PBR	2023–present
Carolina Cobras	NAL	2018–present
Greensboro Swarm	NBA G League	2016–present
Greensboro Roller Derby	WFTDA	2010–present
UNC Greensboro Spartans	SoCon	2009–present
Greensboro Revolution	NIFL	2006–07
Greensboro Prowlers	AF2	2000–03
Atlantic Coast Conference	NCAA women's basketball tournament	2000–present
Greensboro Generals	ECHL	1999–2004
Carolina Hurricanes	NHL	1997–99
Carolina Monarchs	AHL	1995–97
Greensboro City Gators	GBA	1991–92
Greensboro Monarchs	ECHL	1989–95
NCAA Final Four	NCAA	1974
Carolina Cougars	ABA	1969–74
Atlantic Coast Conference	NCAA men's basketball tournament	1967–present
Wake Forest Demon Deacons	ACC	1959–89
Greensboro Generals	EHL / SHL	1959–77

=== Hockey ===
The hockey history of Greensboro began in 1959, when the Greensboro Generals of the Eastern Hockey League arrived and competed until the league folded in 1973. The team moved to the Southern Hockey League for four seasons until it too ceased operations in January 1977.

Greensboro hockey's modern era began with the establishment of the Greensboro Monarchs of the East Coast Hockey League, who played from 1989–90 to 1994–95. When the American Hockey League expanded southward in 1995, it invited Greensboro to join; the new team took the Monarchs nickname, but attempted to draw a more regional fan base by labeling themselves the Carolina Monarchs.

When the Hartford Whalers announced their move to Raleigh, North Carolina, in 1997 as the Carolina Hurricanes, they leased the Coliseum for two years while waiting for the Raleigh Entertainment and Sports Arena (now Lenovo Center) in Raleigh to be completed. Subjected to ticket price increases and unwilling to support a team that was destined for Raleigh, Greensboro hockey fans rarely filled the arena for Hurricane games. Meanwhile, Triangle fans were unwilling to make the hour-long drive across Interstate 40 to Greensboro. As a result, the Hurricanes played in front of some of the smallest NHL crowds since the 1950s. During the 1998–99 season, the team curtained off most of the upper deck for home games in an effort to artificially create scarcity in the ticket market, force would-be attendees to purchase higher-priced tickets, and hide what national media mocked as "green acres" of empty seats.

Once the Raleigh Entertainment and Sports Arena was completed and the Hurricanes moved out, the plan was that the Monarchs, who spent those two years in New Haven, Connecticut, as the Beast of New Haven, would move back into the venue as a Hurricanes affiliate. Monarchs owner Bill Black tried to bring the Monarchs back to Greensboro, but the Hurricanes refused to claim the Monarchs as their affiliate. After the deal fell through, Bill Black tried to sell shares to the public in a final attempt to bring the Monarchs back to Greensboro.

Rather than leave the Coliseum without a hockey team for the first time in more than 10 years, a new hockey team was founded, the Greensboro Generals, returning the city to the East Coast Hockey League. The Generals competed in the arena until 2004, when they were terminated by the ECHL due to poor performance and lackluster support from the community. Increased operating expenses from the ECHL Players Union and overhead costs as a result of recent Coliseum renovations significantly affected the Generals' ability to promote within the community. It was revealed that after the team folded, nearly all of the money used to support the team over and above ticket revenues, could have been covered by Coliseum advertising revenue that was purchased as a direct result of the hockey team's presence.

After the Generals folded, the complex saw a significant revenue drop in local advertising and to this day, the Coliseum operations must be supplemented with nearly $2 million a year from the city government. Twenty years later a new ECHL team was announced for Greensboro. The Greensboro Gargoyles will begin play for the 2025–26 season.

=== Basketball ===
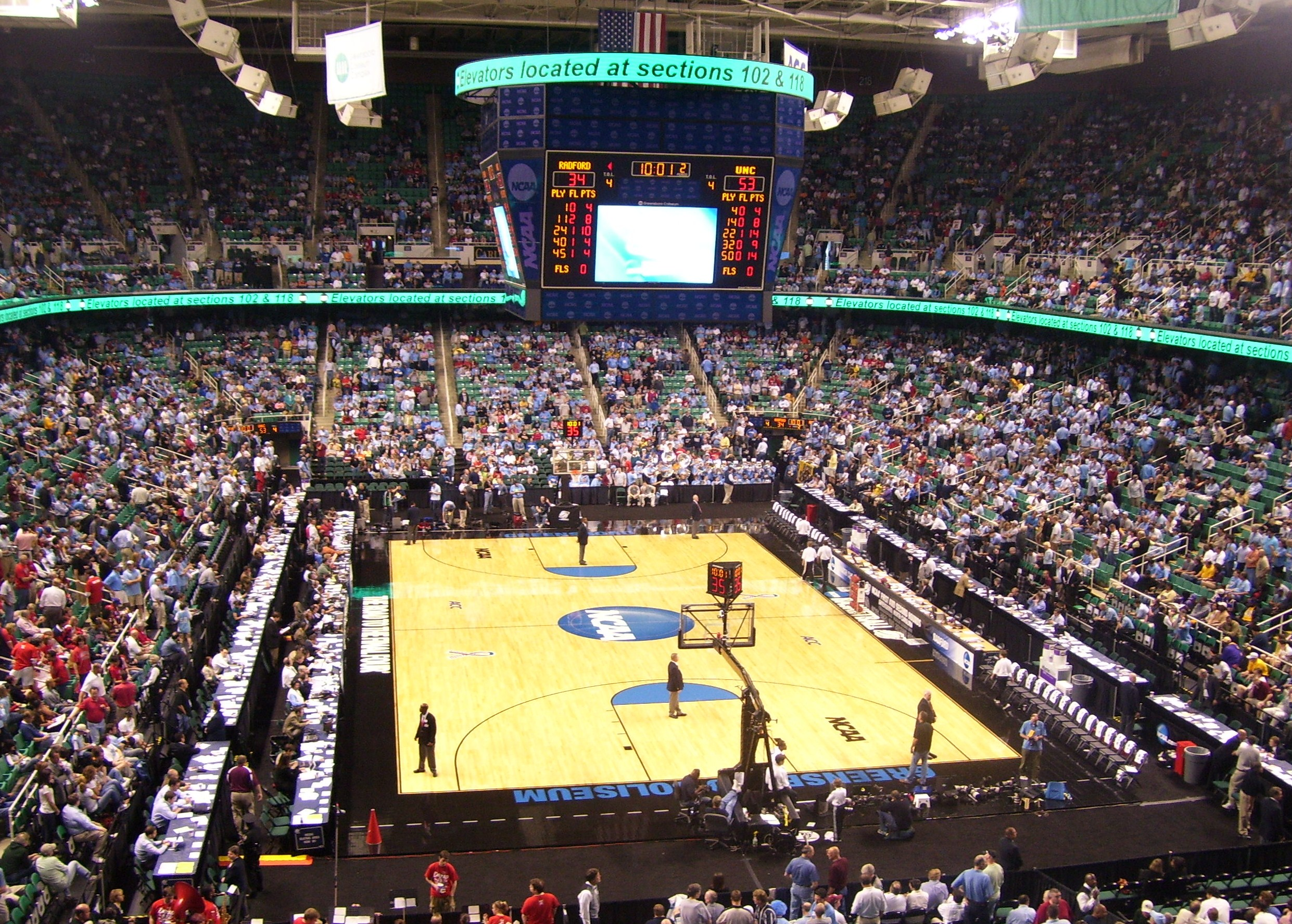
UNC vs. Radford (c. 2009)

The Carolina Cougars of the American Basketball Association played a majority of their home games at the Greensboro Coliseum during their tenure in North Carolina from 1969 to 1974, before moving to St. Louis and becoming the Spirits of St. Louis. The Greensboro City Gaters played their first and only season as a charter franchise of the Global Basketball Association minor league in 1991–1992 in the Greensboro Coliseum.

The Greensboro Coliseum has played host to many college basketball tournaments. The Atlantic Coast Conference has held their men's basketball tournament at the Coliseum 26 times since 1967, the most of any venue. This is in part because the arena was within seven hours' drive of the conference's original footprint, and is within an hour of most of the fanbases of the conference's heartland in North Carolina. The most recent event was in 2023, and will return in 2027. The Greensboro Coliseum also hosted the Big Four Tournament from 1971 to 1981. It has also hosted the MEAC men's basketball tournament ten times.

It has played host to 14 men's NCAA tournaments, most notably the 1974 Final Four and Lehigh's upset of Duke in 2012. It most recently hosted the NCAA tournament in 2023, when it served as a first and second round site. It was the host of the Southern Conference men's basketball tournament from 1996 to 1999. The Coliseum has been the home for the ACC women's basketball tournament since 2000, and is contracted through 2015. It hosted the Greensboro Regional in the women's NCAA tournament in 2007 and 2008. The Coliseum is the first arena to host three basketball tournaments in consecutive weeks. The Coliseum has also hosted NBA basketball, high school basketball, and the Harlem Globetrotters.

From 1959 to 1989, the Wake Forest Demon Deacons basketball team played a portion of its home schedule at the Coliseum, usually games against popular opponents that could not be accommodated in the smaller Winston-Salem Memorial Coliseum. In practice, Wake Forest played most of its ACC games during this period at the Coliseum. From the 1960s to the 1980s, North Carolina, Duke and North Carolina State frequently played neutral-site games at the Coliseum, as it was the state's largest arena at the time. The Tar Heels still occasionally play a neutral-site game here, as late as 2012. Between its service as Wake Forest's de facto primary home court and its many neutral-site and postseason games, the Coliseum has hosted many of the most important basketball games in North Carolina's history.

Since 2010, the UNC Greensboro (UNCG) Spartans men's basketball team has played at the Coliseum, having moved there from the smaller Fleming Gymnasium on the campus of UNCG. For Spartans games, most of the upper level is curtained off.

In October 2015, the Charlotte Hornets chose Greensboro for the location of their new NBA G League team the Greensboro Swarm. The Swarm began play at the Novant Health Fieldhouse in the 2016–17 season.

On October 6, 2016, the Hornets played a preseason game against the Boston Celtics at the Coliseum.

During the 2021–22 NBA G League season, the Coliseum served as one of the temporary home arenas for the Capitanes de la Ciudad de México during their inaugural season at the NBA G League despite also being temporarily stationed at Fort Worth, Texas at the time due to the long-term effects of the COVID-19 pandemic.

=== Arena football ===
The Coliseum first saw an arena football team when the Greensboro Prowlers of the af2 league played in the Coliseum from 1999 until 2004. The team folded due to a poor record and lack of fan support. The Greensboro Revolution of the National Indoor Football League played here in 2006 and 2007. The team ceased operations on January 23, 2008.

In 2018, the Coliseum began to host the Carolina Cobras, an expansion team of the National Arena League. The Cobras went on to win the league championship, going 10–5 in the regular season and winning their two playoff games, both hosted at the Coliseum. They defeated the Columbus Lions with a final score of 66–8. The team is still in operation today and has played for the championship in four of five seasons.

== Other events ==
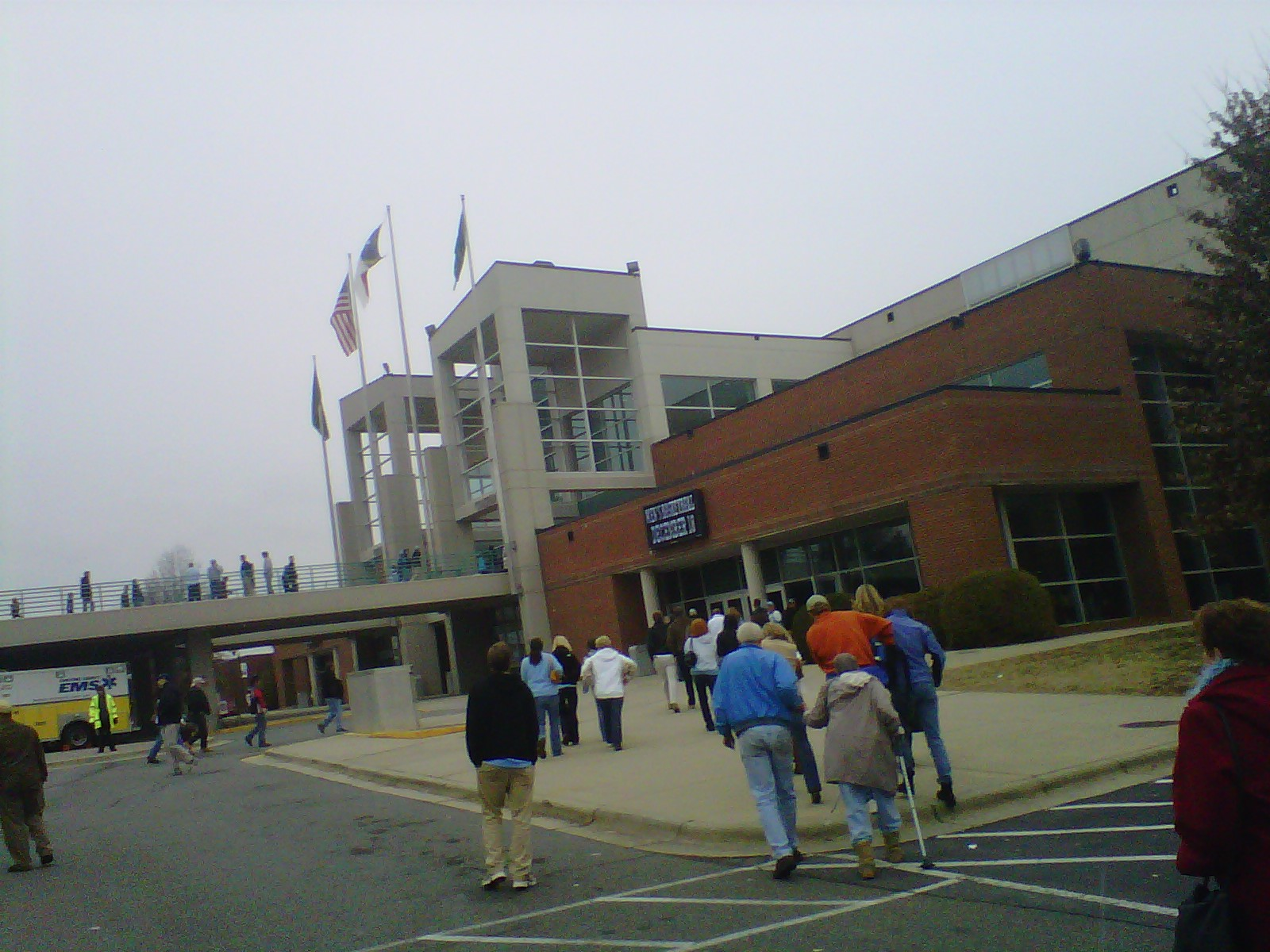
Entrance to coliseum before a sports event (c.) 2010

The Coliseum has hosted many events over time, including Monster Jam, Arenacross, the PBR, High School Musical: The Concert, the Ringling Bros. and Barnum & Bailey Circus, and large-scale religious gatherings.

Former North Carolina senator Kay Hagan held her Senate Victory Party at the Special Events Center on November 4, 2008. The Greensboro Coliseum has also hosted the National Figure Skating Championships twice.

In addition, its neighboring auditorium and special events center have hosted concerts, trade shows, broadway theatre shows and similar events. The auditorium, which was not included in the 1993 renovation of the complex, will soon be renovated to include a banquet hall. In 2002, the 1st Annual King of the Concrete indoor go-kart race was held at this facility. In February 2016, The Coliseum hosted the 2016 US Olympic Table Tennis Trials.

In 2016, the arena hosted the Kellogg's Tour of Gymnastics Champions.

Greensboro Coliseum has had a wide history with hosting professional wrestling going back to the territorial days of Jim Crockett Promotions. It has hosted a number of NWA and WCW events through the years, including the first four Starrcade events in 1983, 1984, 1985 and 1986, Clash of the Champions I in 1988, as well as the 1990 WrestleWar event. WWE has also held events at the Greensboro Coliseum, including Unforgiven: In Your House in 1998, the 1999 King of the Ring and the 2001 Survivor Series when Team WWF defeated Team Alliance and the Alliance was forced to disband. Most recently WWE revived the Starrcade event and held it at the Coliseum on November 25, 2017.

On March 3, 2024, All Elite Wrestling (AEW) held Revolution at the Coliseum. Sting wrestled his retirement match at this event where he and Darby Allin retained the AEW World Tag Team Championships. It was also the first wrestling pay-per-view at the Coliseum in over 20 years.

== See also ==
- List of contemporary amphitheatres
- List of indoor arenas by capacity
- List of NCAA Division I basketball arenas

Preceded by St. Louis Arena	NCAA Division I men's basketball tournament Finals venue 1974	Succeeded by San Diego Sports Arena
Preceded by Hartford Civic Center	Home of the Carolina Hurricanes; 1997–1999	Succeeded by Raleigh Entertainment & Sports Arena
