= Alameda County Fairgrounds =

Fairground in Pleasanton, California, U.S.

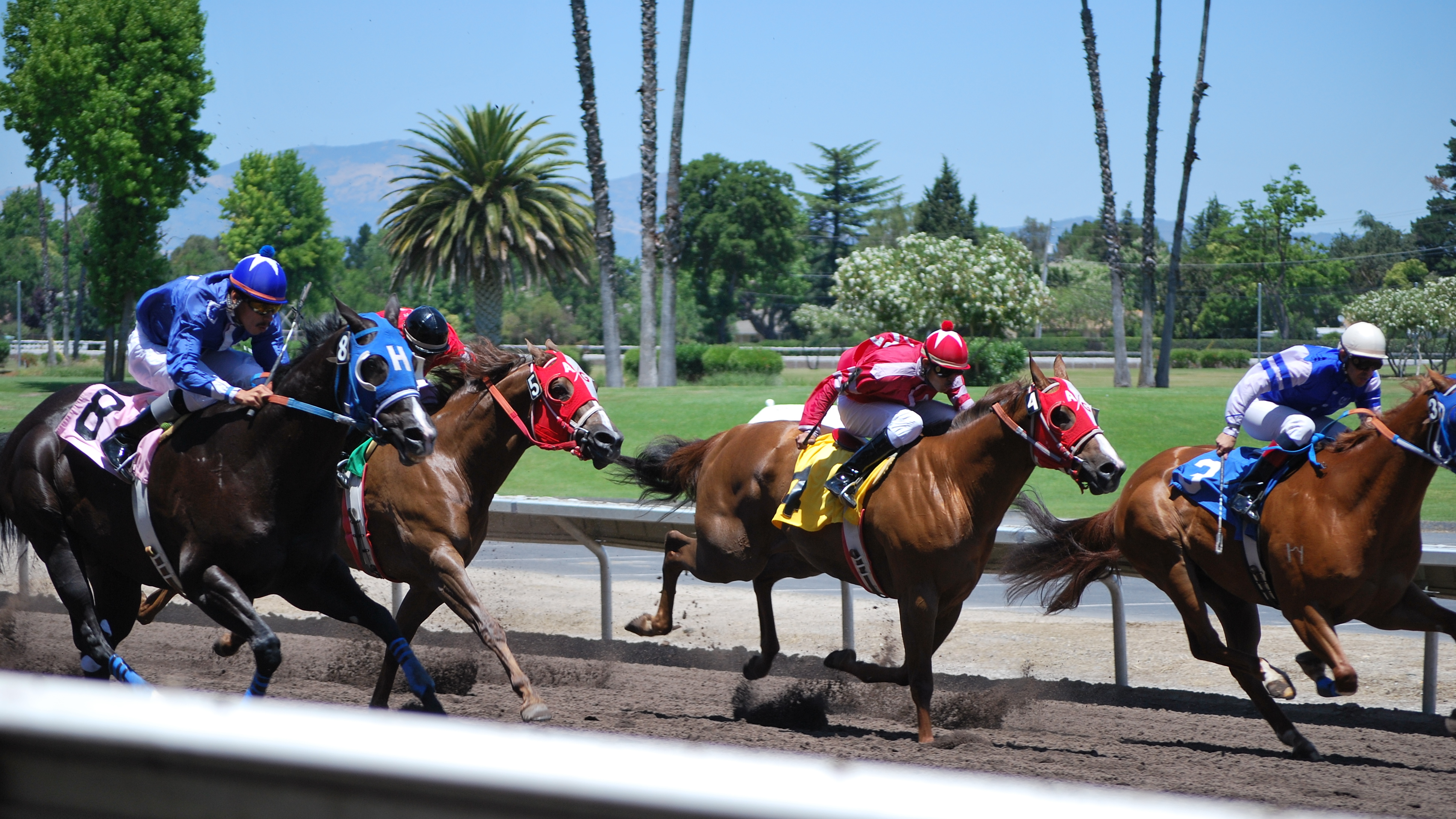
Quarter Horse racing at Fairgrounds

The Alameda County Fairgrounds is a 270-acre (110 ha) facility located in Pleasanton, California. It is home to the annual Alameda County Fair, held since 1912, as well as numerous trade shows and community events. Located on its grounds, the Pleasanton Fairgrounds Racetrack was built in 1858, making it the oldest one-mile (1.6 km) horse racing track in the United States. There is a 3,000 seat amphitheater, as well as a 9-hole golf course located within the track's infield.

The Alameda County Central Railroad Society has maintained a model train exhibit at the fairgrounds since 1959, which has grown to two 15-by-100-foot (4.6 by 30.5 m) layouts in O scale and HO scale.

Building J, also known as the Amador Pavilion, is a multi-purpose arena and livestock event facility at the fairgrounds. It was briefly home to the Tri-Valley Ranchers of the National Indoor Football League.

The Fair was not held in 1917–1918, 1942–1944 and 2020, due to two world wars and the COVID-19 pandemic.

== Heathcote-MacKenzie House ==
- Heathcote--MacKenzie House
- U.S. National Register of Historic Places
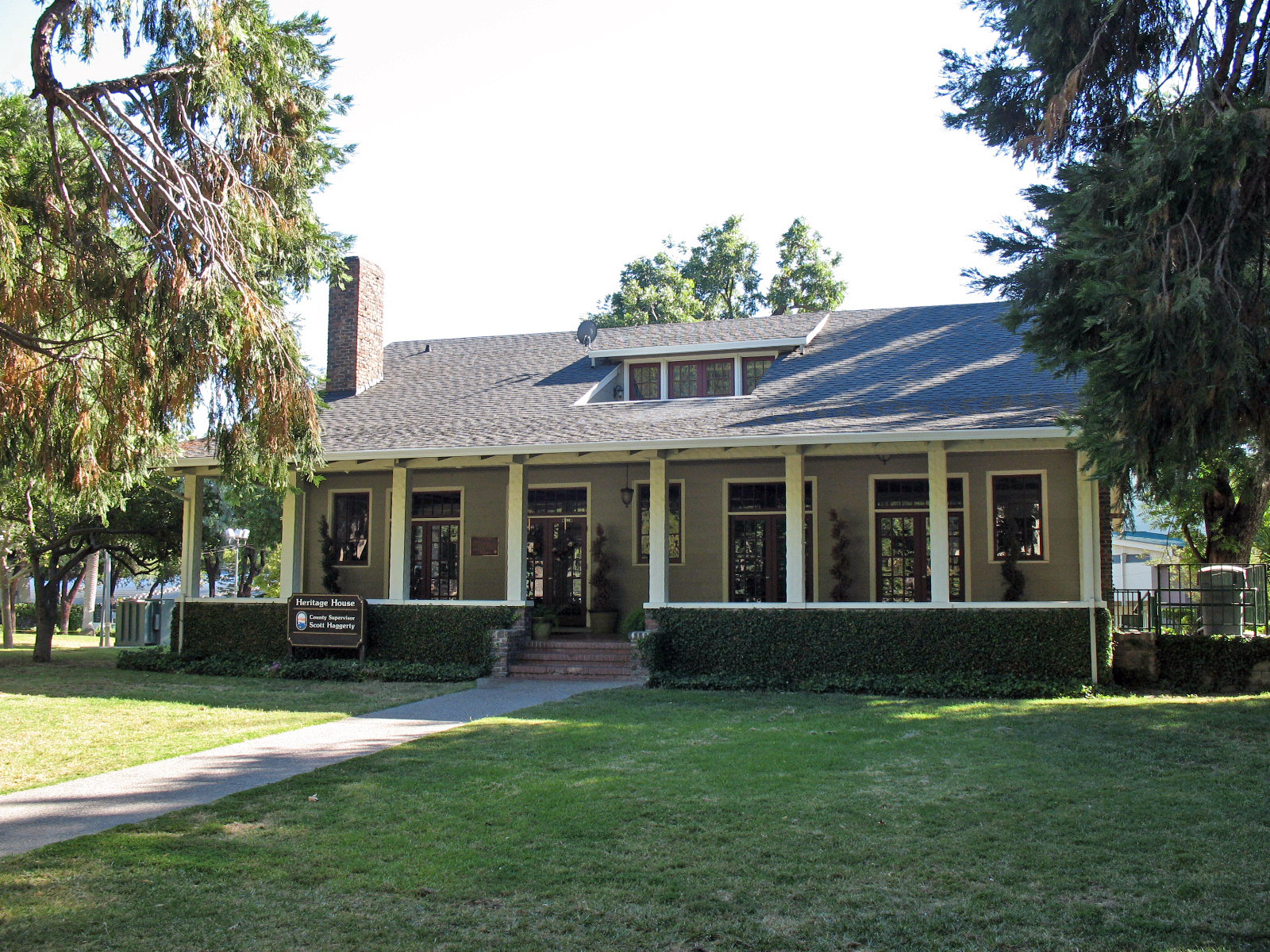

- Location within California Location within the United States
- Location: 4501 Pleasanton Ave., Pleasanton, California
- Coordinates: 37°39′36″N 121°53′02″W
- Area: 0.4 acres (0.16 ha)
- Architectural style: Bungalow/craftsman
- NRHP reference No.: 91001538
- Added to NRHP: October 29, 1991

The Heathcote-MacKenzie House, also known as The Heritage House, was built on the site of the fairgrounds around 1905, to host wealthy harness racers from Canada who wintered their horses in Pleasanton. It was listed on the National Register of Historic Places in 1991.

== Notable events ==
Besides the annual fair, events regularly held at the fairgrounds include:

- The Scottish Highland Gathering and Games, which has been held annually since 1866 and is one of the largest Highland games in the United States.
- The Pirates Of Emerson Haunted House
- Several annual automobile shows managed by the Goodguys Rod & Custom Association
- Night to Shine prom hosted by Cornerstone Fellowship

== See also ==
- List of convention centers in the United States
