= Sixer =

The Philadelphia 76ers, commonly called the "Sixers" for short, are an American professional basketball team playing in the National Basketball Association.

Sixer or Sixers may also refer to:

- Sixer (2007 film), an Indian Kannada-language film
- Sixer (2019 film), an Indian Tamil-language film
- Fort Worth Sixers, a National Indoor Football League franchise in the United States
- Cricket:
  - Sydney Sixers, an Australian cricket franchise
  - Sixer (cricket), an act of scoring six runs
- Southern Sixers, mountains in the southern United States which are at least six thousand feet tall
- Stephen Kellogg and the Sixers, an American rock band
- Sixers, characters in the American TV series Terra Nova
- Sixer, a member of a Cub Pack who leads a team called a "Six"
- Sixers, the slang term for members of the IOI in Ready Player One
