= Colorado Sports Center =

Athletic facility in Monument, Colorado, US

Coordinates: 39.06764°N 104.86148°W

The Colorado Sports Center (officially called the Colorado Sports and Events Center) is a multi-purpose indoor athletic facility located in Monument, Colorado, just outside Colorado Springs. It features two separate buildings that feature and NHL-sized ice rink and a second rink. The facilities play host to ice hockey, figure skating, broomball, indoor soccer and box lacrosse. It is the home of the Colorado Wild Riders of the National Indoor Football League.
