= Staten Island Pavilion =

Arena in Staten Island, New York

Coordinates: 40.54402°N 74.23255°W

Staten Island Pavilion is a 3,000-seat multi-purpose arena in Staten Island, New York. It hosts various local concerts and sporting events for the area and was the home arena for the Staten Island Xtreme of the National Indoor Football League in 2004. The opposing Atlantic City CardSharks once refused to play a game at the Pavilion, claiming its playing field was in poor condition and too dangerous to play on.

The pavilion is currently used primarily for ice skating and hockey. It underwent extensive renovations in 2022.
