= Camp Jordan Arena =

Sports arena near Chattanooga, Tennessee, U.S.

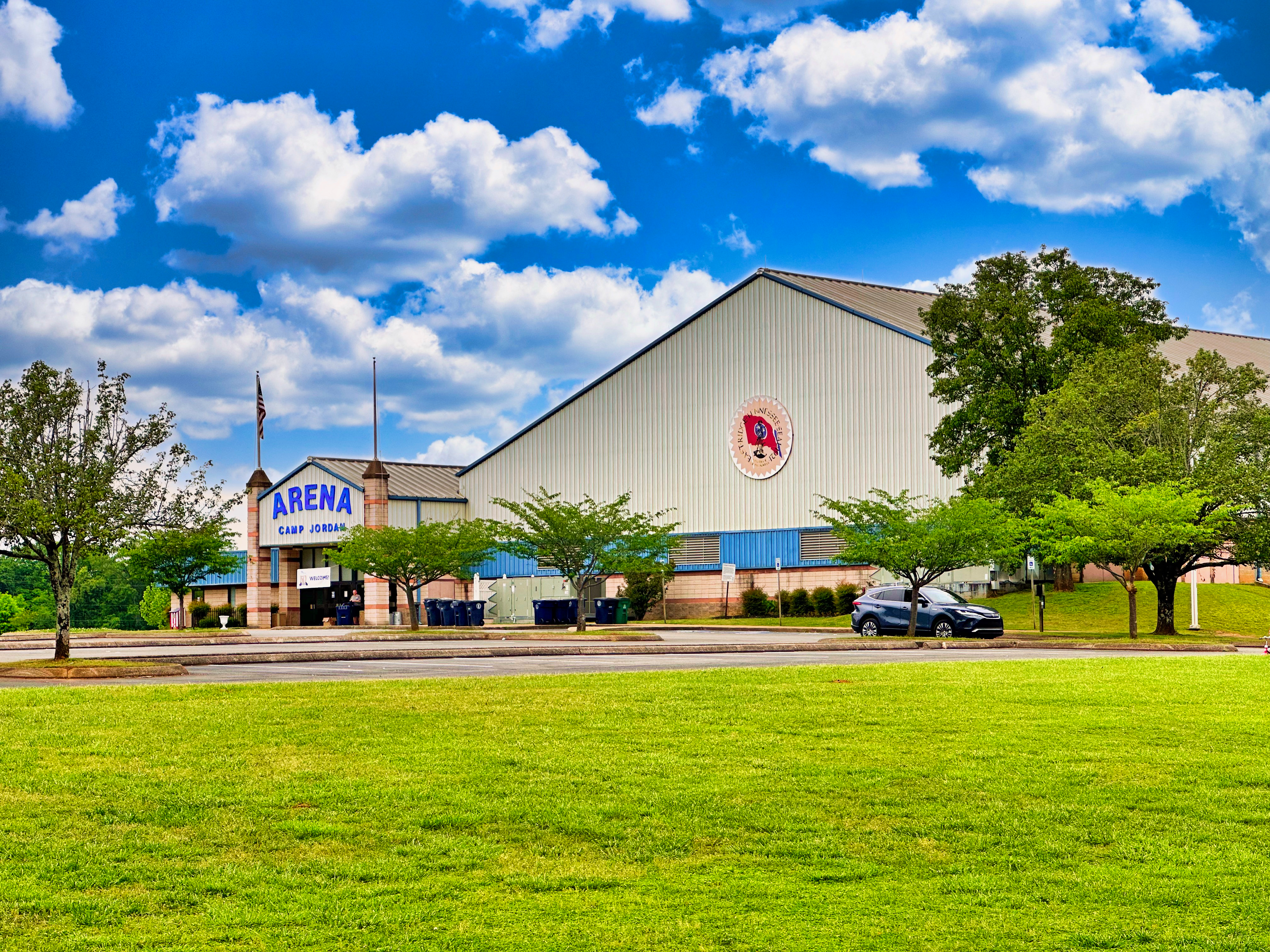
- Interactive map of Camp Jordan Arena
- Location: Camp Jordan Parkway, East Ridge, Tennessee 37412
- Coordinates: 34.99934°N 85.19798°W
- Capacity: 4000

Construction
- Opened: 1993

Tenant
- Tennessee River Sharks (NIFL) (2006)

The Camp Jordan Arena is a 4,000-seat multi-purpose arena in East Ridge, Tennessee (a suburb of Chattanooga) built in 1993. It was formerly home to the Tennessee River Sharks of the National Indoor Football League.
