= Bernard Edwards (American football) =

American football player (born 1969)

No. 9
- Positions: Wide receiver, linebacker

Personal information
- Born: February 24, 1969 (age 57); Fort Myers, Florida, U.S.
- Listed height: 6 ft 5 in (1.96 m)
- Listed weight: 205 lb (93 kg)

Career information
- High school: Fort Myers
- College: Ohio State (1987–1991)
- NFL draft: 1992: undrafted

Career history
- Phoenix Cardinals (1992)*; Miami Hooters/Florida Bobcats (1994–2000); Tampa Bay Storm (2001)
- * Offseason or practice squad member only

Awards and highlights
- First-team All-Arena (1995)

Career AFL statistics
- Receptions: 431
- Receiving yards: 5,318
- Receiving TDs: 97
- Tackles: 106
- Interceptions: 6
- Stats at ArenaFan.com

Bernard Edwards (born February 24, 1969) is an American former professional football player who played eight seasons in the Arena Football League (AFL) with the Miami Hooters/Florida Bobcats and Tampa Bay Storm. He was a wide receiver and quarterback at Fort Myers High School in Fort Myers, Florida. He played college football at Ohio State University, and was the team's leading receiver his senior year in 1991. Edwards signed with the Phoenix Cardinals of the National Football League (NFL) in 1992 after going undrafted, but was released before the start of the season. He then played in the AFL from 1994 to 2001, spending his first two seasons as an offensive specialist before converting to wide receiver/linebacker. In 1994, he set a since-broken AFL record for receiving touchdowns in a game with six. He was named first-team All-Arena in 1995 while playing for the Miami Hooters. In October 1999, Edwards was ranked 39th on The News-Press's Southwest Florida all-sports all-millennium team. He was later the head coach of the Fort Myers Tarpons of the National Indoor Football League in 2007.

== Early life ==
Bernard Edwards was born on February 24, 1969, in Fort Myers, Florida. He played high school football, baseball, and basketball at Fort Myers High School. In football, he caught 42 passes for 549 yards and six touchdowns as a wide receiver his junior year in 1985. Edwards threw for 949 yards and nine touchdowns at quarterback as a senior in 1986, earning second-team all-state honors. He scored three touchdowns at quarterback during his final high school game. Edwards also garnered second-team all-state recognition in basketball, and scored a career-high 42 points in a game his senior year. He graduated from high school in 1987. He originally committed to play college football for the Miami Hurricanes but switched to Ohio State University.

== College career ==
Edwards played college football for the Ohio State Buckeyes as a wide receiver. He was redshirted in 1987 and was a four-year letterman from 1988 to 1991. He played in 11 games, starting one, as a redshirt freshman in 1988, catching 11 passes for 170 yards and one touchdown. Edwards appeared in eight games (no starts) in 1989, catching 10 passes for 130 yards and one touchdown. He was benched for part of the 1989 season for not blocking. He played in 12 games (no starts) as a junior in 1990, totaling 12 receptions for 179 yards. Edwards contemplated not coming back for his senior season due to a strained relationship with offensive coordinator Jim Colletto. However, Colletto left after the 1990 season to became the head coach at Purdue. Edwards became a regular starter his senior year in 1991, appearing in 12 games (10 starts) while catching 25 passes for 364 yards and two touchdowns. Edwards led Ohio State in receiving yards and receiving touchdowns as a senior and also tied for the team lead in receptions. He played in 43 games total, starting 11, during his college career. He first majored in criminology at Ohio State but switched to sociology, graduating with a degree in the latter.

== Professional career ==
=== Pre-draft ===
At the 1992 NFL Combine, Edwards posted a 4.67 second 40-yard dash and a 30.5 inch vertical jump. He was rated the 38th best receiver in the 1992 NFL draft by Mel Kiper Jr. Kiper was impressed by Edwards' "size and athleticism" but also stated "Questionable speed limits his chances of sticking with most NFL clubs, since possession types are a dime a dozen."

=== Phoenix Cardinals ===
Edwards signed with the Phoenix Cardinals after going undrafted. At minicamp in May 1992, Edwards was noted for a leaping catch over Cardinals starting cornerback Lorenzo Lynch. Edwards was released by the Cardinals on August 18, 1992.

=== Baseball ===
In November 1992, despite not having played baseball since high school, Edwards signed a minor league contract with the Seattle Mariners to play baseball during the 1993 season.

=== Miami Hooters/Florida Bobcats ===
In November 1993, Edwards signed with the Miami Hooters of the Arena Football League (AFL). The AFL played under ironman rules, meaning players played both offense and defense. However, AFL teams were also allowed one offensive specialist and one defensive specialist whom only played one side (besides the quarterback). Edwards was an offensive specialist during his time with the Hooters. On July 15, 1994, he had an AFL single-game record six receiving touchdowns in a 66–52 victory over the Arizona Rattlers. Overall, he played in 11 games for the Hooters during the 1994 season, catching 69 passes for 842 yards and 13 touchdowns as the team finished 5–7. Edwards appeared in all 12 games for Miami in 1995, recording 86 receptions for 1,124 yards and 19 touchdowns. He was named first-team All-Arena for his performance during the 1995 season. Despite his strong season, the Hooters finished the year with a 1–11 record.

At a press conference on December 9, 1995, it was announced that the Hooters would be moving to West Palm Beach, Florida, to become the Florida Bobcats. Edwards unveiled the team's new uniforms at the press conference. In 1996, new head coach Jim Jensen moved Edwards from offensive specialist to wide receiver/linebacker, marking the first time in Edwards' football career that he had ever played defense. In regards to the position change, Edwards stated "I think [Jensen] just wanted me to use more of my talent." Edwards played in ten games for the Bobcats during the 1996 season, totaling 59 catches for 736 yards and 13 touchdowns, 17 solo tackles, nine assisted tackles, one interception, and four pass breakups. He also missed games due to various injuries, including an ankle injury and a stress fracture.

On June 10, 1997, he had a career-high 11 receptions for 137 yards and four touchdowns in a 44–40 victory over the New York CityHawks. He appeared in all 14 games in 1997, recording 73 receptions for 920 yards and 15 touchdowns, 13 solo tackles, 13 assisted tackles, one fumble recovery, and three pass breakups. Florida finished the 1997 season with a 4–10 record. On May 23, 1998, the winless Bobcats (0–4) faced the undefeated (4–0) defending-ArenaBowl champion Tampa Bay Storm. With six seconds remaining in the fourth quarter and the score tied at 54, Edwards made a one-handed six-yard touchdown catch to help the Bobcats win 61–54. Overall in the game, Edwards caught eight passes for 89 yards and four touchdowns, earning AFL Player of the Week honors. Edwards played in 13 games in 1998, totaling 58 receptions for 685 yards and 16 touchdowns, seven solo tackles, 11 assisted tackles, and two interceptions. He appeared in ten games in 1999, catching 30 passes for 326 yards and five touchdowns while also posting five solo tackles, three assisted tackles, one fumble recovery, and one pass breakup.

In October 1999, Edwards was ranked 39th on The News-Press's Southwest Florida all-sports all-millennium team. Edwards played in the first three games of the 2000 season before missing the rest of the year due to a knee injury. Overall in 2000, he totaled three receptions for 42 yards and one touchdown, one solo tackle, two assisted tackles, and two interceptions that he returned 37 yards for two touchdowns. The Bobcats finished 3–11 each year from 1998 to 2000.

=== Tampa Bay Storm ===
On October 31, 2000, Edwards signed with the Tampa Bay Storm of the AFL. In the 2001 season-opener against his former team, the Florida Bobcats, Edwards had three touchdown catches and a career-high 12 tackles, earning Ironman of the Game honors. He played in all 14 games for the Storm in 2001, accumulating 53 catches for 643 yards and 15 touchdowns, a career-high 21 solo tackles and 46 assisted tackles, one fumble recovery, one interception, and nine pass breakups. The Storm finished the regular season with a 10–4 record, marking Edwards' first winning season in the AFL. He missed the team's playoff loss to the Indiana Firebirds due to injury. Edwards retired from the AFL after the 2001 season.

== Personal life ==
On January 29, 1995, Edwards appeared as an extra, playing quarterback and receiver, in a McDonald's commercial aired during Super Bowl XXIX.

Edwards was a law teacher, basketball coach, and track coach at Cypress Lake High School from 1998 to 2000. He missed the first few games of the AFL season each year due to his teaching career. He was arrested in November 2000 and pleaded no contest on February 26, 2001, to having unlawful sexual activity with a minor. Edwards lost his teaching license and was sentenced to five years of probation.

In 2008, it was reported that Edwards was the owner and operator of both a courier service and a beauty salon. His son, Bernard Edwards Jr., played college basketball at Jacksonville and Nova Southeastern.

== Coaching career ==
Edwards was the receivers coach for the Florida Firecats of the af2 in 2002. He left the team after the fourth game of the season to pursue other business interests.

Edwards was the head coach of the Fort Myers Tarpons of the National Indoor Football League in 2007. The Tarpons played two games before folding, finishing with a 2–0 record. Edwards was the assistant head coach and defensive coordinator of the Florida Stingrays of the American Indoor Football Association in 2008.
