= Seven Feathers Event Center =

- Interactive map of Seven Feathers Event Center
- Full name: Seven Feathers Event Center
- Former names: Compton Arena
- Address: 1 Penninger Road
- Location: Central Point, Oregon
- Coordinates: 42.3864°N 122.9112°W
- Owner: Jackson County Exposition Park & Fairgrounds
- Operator: City of Central Point
- Capacity: 4,200 (rodeo and indoor football)

Tenants
- Southern Oregon Heat (NIFL) (2001); Wild Rogue Pro Rodeo

Website
- www.attheexpo.com

Seven Feathers Event Center (formerly Compton Arena) is a 4,200-seat multi-purpose arena in Central Point, Oregon, United States, on the grounds of Jackson County Fairgrounds. It hosts local concerts and sporting events and was the home arena for the Southern Oregon Heat of the National Indoor Football League in 2001, affectionately called "The Inferno".

On July 3, 2015, it was announced that the Cow Creek Band of Umpqua Tribe of Indians had signed a three-year, $240,000 naming rights deal, naming the event center after its Seven Feathers Casino Resort in Canyonville. The deal has since been extended.
