= Denver Coliseum =

Indoor arena in Denver, Colorado

Coordinates: 39.7791279°N 104.9707305°W

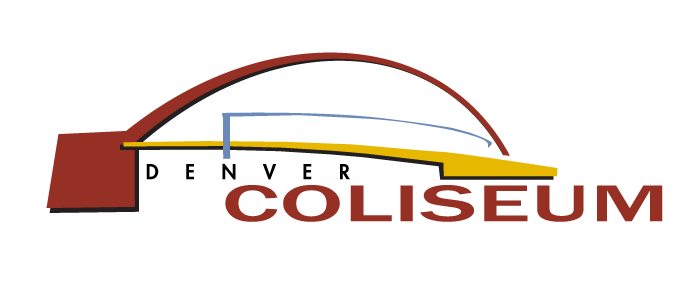

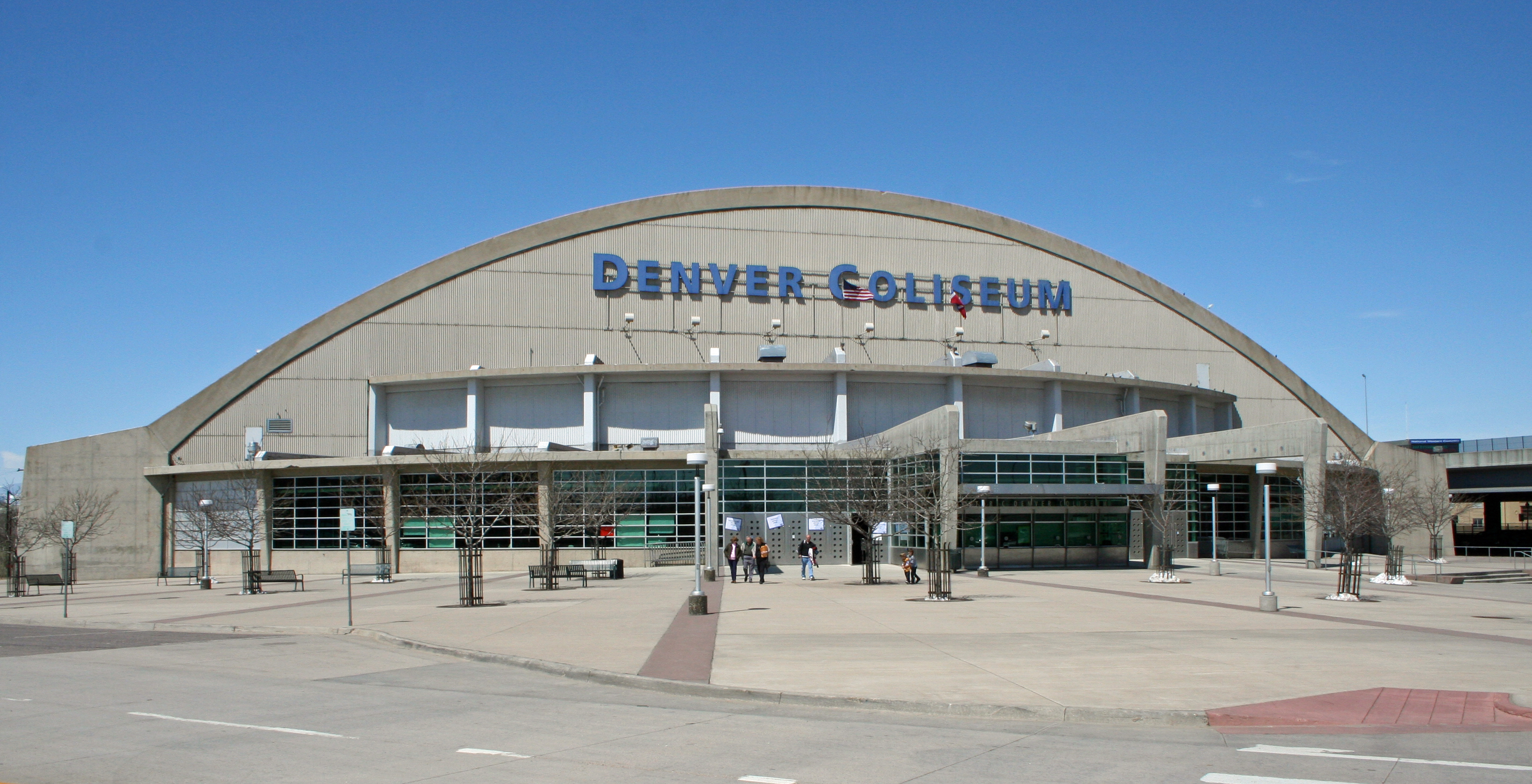
- Exterior view of venue (c.2009)
- Former names: Denver Municipal Stadium (planning/construction)
- Address: 4600 Humboldt St; Denver, CO 80216
- Location: Elyria-Swansea
- Owner: City and County of Denver
- Operator: Denver Arts & Venues
- Capacity: 10,500 Detailed capacity: Basketball: 9,340; Motorsports: 8,140; Hockey: 8,140; Rodeos: 8,140
- Field size: 122,400 square feet (11,370 m^{2})

Construction
- Groundbreaking: September 16, 1949
- Opened: November 8, 1951 (Dedicated January 10, 1952)
- Cost: $3 million ($40.6 million in 2025 dollars)
- Architect: Roland Linder
- Structural engineers: Lorimer and Rose
- General contractors: Roberts & Schaefer Company

Tenants
- Denver Mavericks (IHL) (1959); Denver Invaders (WHL) (1963-64); Denver Rockets/Nuggets (ABA) (1967-75); Denver Spurs (WHL/CHL) (1968-75); Denver/Colorado Rangers (IHL) (1987-89); Denver Pioneers MIH (NCAA) (1997-99); Denver Pioneers MBB (NCAA) (1997-99); Denver Pioneers WBB (NCAA) (1997-99); Colorado Wildcats (PIFL) (1998); Denver Aviators (NIFL) (2007); Denver Cutthroats (CHL) (2012-14); Colorado Blizzard (M2) (2017-18); Colorado Spartans (NAL) (2025-present)

Website
- Venue Website

The Denver Coliseum is an indoor arena located in Denver, Colorado. The arena was built from 1949 to 1951, where the Denver Pacific Railway broke ground on its Cheyenne line in 1868.

Opening on November 8, 1951, with a six-day run of Shipstads & Johnson Ice Follies. Today, the venue is an integral venue of the National Western Stock Show and hosts a multitude of other events including: commencement ceremonies, rodeos, ice shows, motor shows, circuses, concerts, motivational seminars, dances, exhibits and trade shows.

Notables include: CHSAA high school volleyball, spirit and basketball playoffs and championships, Disney on Ice, Denver March Pow Wow, Rocky Mountain Percussion Association State Championship Finals, the Mineral, Fossil, Gem, and Jewelry Show, cheerleading & gymnastic competitions and roller derby.

After the McNichols Sports Arena opened in 1975, the venue continued on as an alternate venue to the larger arena for events requiring less seating or overall space. This continues today after the Ball Arena opened in 1999, and the subsequent demolition of McNichols in 2000.

== History ==
On January 10, 1952, June Haver and Walter O'Keefe hosted the official dedication on the eve of the first stock show. Over the years the arena hosted many celebrities and artists including:

- Elvis Presley (April 8, 1956 [2 shows], November 17, 1970, April 30, 1973)
- The Grateful Dead (November 20–21, 1973)
- The Who (December 4–5, 1971)
- Frank Sinatra (May 1, 1975)
- The Rolling Stones (November 29, 1965, June 16, 1972)
- Led Zeppelin (March 25, 1970, June 21, 1972, May 25, 1973)
- Stevie Wonder (November 3, 1974)
- The Lovin' Spoonful
- The Monkees
- Cream
- Crosby, Stills, Nash & Young (November 26, 1969, May 12, 1970)
- Ike & Tina Turner Revue (May 23, 1970, August 19, 1971)
- The Jackson 5 (August 20, 1971, February 23, 1974)
- Black Sabbath (February 27, 1971, October 18, 1971)
- The Moody Blues
- Pink Floyd (April 17, 1975)
- Neil Diamond (May 8, 1971)
- Santana
- Jethro Tull
- Yes
- Eagles (August 2, 1972)
- Bob Dylan
- Eric Clapton
- Megadeth (February 13, 1995)
- Rage Against the Machine (November 1999)
- Rammstein (May 20, 2012)
- Bassnectar (June 10, 2019)

The arena has been home ice to several hockey teams from various leagues including the Denver Cutthroats (2012–14), the Denver/Colorado Rangers (1987–89), the Denver Spurs (1968-75), the Denver Invaders (1963–64) and the Denver Mavericks (1959). The University of Denver Pioneers college hockey team played many of its home games at the Coliseum during the renovation of the University of Denver Arena in 1972-73, and when the current Magness Arena was under construction, between 1997 and 1999. The USA Curling Men's and Women's National Championships were held at the Denver Coliseum during February 5–11, 2023.

The coliseum was an annual stop for the historic Ringling Brothers and Barnum and Bailey Circus and, starting in 2024 will begin hosting Ringling Brothers and Barnum & Bailey presents The Greatest Show On Earth. The venue also hosted the WCW's Spring Stampede (1998), the Colorado Wildcats of the Professional Indoor Football League and the Colorado Spartans (2025) of the National Arena League.

President Dwight Eisenhower stopped in Denver on his tour of western states in support of Republican candidates on October 8, 1962. In 1976, a planned Marvin Gaye concert was canceled after learning that Gaye was at his home in Los Angeles sleeping, led to rioting at the coliseum, a series of lawsuits for fraud and deceiving ticket buyers, and giving the media a field day as the top story. On April 5, 2005, after a women's boxing match held at the coliseum, boxer Becky Zerlentes died of her injuries following a third-round knockout loss to Heather Schmitz. Santana played the Denver Coliseum six times, securing the title of "House Band".

Denver Department of Public Health & Environment utilized the Coliseum as a shelter for people experiencing homelessness from 2020 to 2021 to provide safe distancing which existing shelters could not provide in response to COVID-19, as a warming shelter for two nights of extreme cold during December 21–23, 2022.
