= Bradenton Area Convention Center =

Arena in Florida, United States

- Interactive map of Bradenton Area Convention Center
- Full name: Bradenton Area Convention Center
- Former names: Manatee Civic Center
- Address: 1 Haben Boulevard; Palmetto, FL 34221
- Location: Palmetto, Florida
- Coordinates: 27.514932°N 82.561719°W
- Owner: Palmetto, Florida
- Operator: Palmetto, Florida
- Capacity: 4,000

Construction
- Opened: 1985
- Renovated: 2012

Tenants
- Florida Stingers (CBA) (1985–1986); Florida Knights/Scorpions (APFL) (2008, 2011)

Bradenton Area Convention Center, formerly Manatee Civic Center, is a 4,000-seat multi-purpose arena and convention center in Palmetto, Florida. It was home to the Florida Stingers of the Continental Basketball Association and Florida Scorpions of the American Professional Football League. It also hosted UWF's first and only live pay-per-view event, Beach Brawl, on June 9, 1991.
