= Clay County Fairgrounds =

Fairgrounds in Green Cove Springs, Florida

Coordinates: 29.98°N 81.741°W

The Clay County Fairgrounds, officially known as the Paul E. Reinhold Agricultural Fairgrounds, are fairgrounds located in Green Cove Springs, in Clay County, Florida, United States.

Spanning 45 acres (180,000 m^{2}) first donated to the county by Paul and Klare Reinhold in 1972, the site hosts the annual Clay County Agricultural Fair, which was first held in 1987. The fairgrounds contain several indoor and outdoor venues, one of which was the intended home to the Green Cove Lions of the National Indoor Football League in 2007.
