= Hammond Heroes =

Logo

General information
- Founded: 2006
- Folded: 2006
- Headquartered: Hammond, Louisiana; Planned to play at the University Center
- Colors: Teal, Gold, Gray

Personnel
- Owner: Tommy Smith
- Head coach: Bill McQuarters

Team history
- Hammond Heroes (2006)

Home fields
- University Center (2006, planned)

League / conference affiliations
- National Indoor Football League (2006)

The Hammond Heroes were a planned professional indoor football team founded by Tommy Smith as a member team of the National Indoor Football League and based in Hammond, Louisiana. They were to have played their home games at the University Center on the campus of Southeastern Louisiana University in Hammond. However, before they could even play one down, they disappeared from the NIFL schedule and were never heard from again.
