= Texas Copperheads =

Arena football team

Logo

General information
- Founded: 2005
- Folded: 2008
- Headquartered: Richard E. Berry Educational Support Center in Cypress, Texas
- Colors: Black, teal, gold

Personnel
- Owners: Bryan Blake; Doug McGregor
- Head coach: Ollie Guidry

Team history
- Katy Copperheads (2006); Texas Copperheads (2007–2008)

Home fields
- Merrell Center (2006); Richard E. Berry Educational Support Center (2007–2008)

League / conference affiliations
- National Indoor Football League (2006): Pacific Conference (2006); Southern Division (2006); AF2 (2007–2008): National Conference (2007–2008); Southwest Division (2007–2008)

Championships
- Division championships: 1: 2006

Playoff appearances (1)
- 2006

The Texas Copperheads were a professional arena football that played in AF2, the minor league for the Arena Football League. The team was founded in 2006 as member of the National Indoor Football League (NIFL). They played their home games at the Richard E. Berry Educational Support Center in Cypress, Texas. They were coached by Ollie Guidry.

== Team history ==
The team started as the Katy Copperheads of the National Indoor Football League in 2005. They moved to the Leonard E. Merrell Center in 2006.

In 2006, they gained national attention on Cold Pizza, a show on ESPN2, in a segment called "A Day In A Life Of An NIFL Team". The same year, they got into the NIFL playoffs but were eliminated by the Rapid City Flying Aces, 60-38.

After the 2006 season, the team announced they were changing their name to the Texas Copperheads, moving to the AF2, and moving to the Richard E. Berry Educational Support Center in Cypress, Texas.

== Records ==
On June 25, 2006, the Copperheads scored 132 points in a game against the West Palm Beach Phantoms – final score 132-3. This record stands as the highest point total for an indoor football game at any level.

The team also has the dubious distinction of being only the second AF2 team (after the Peoria Pirates' opening-day loss to the Quad City Steamwheelers in 2001) ever to suffer a shutout loss (a 52-0 road defeat to the Bossier-Shreveport Battle Wings on April 14, 2007).

In March 2006, the Copperheads became the first indoor football team to produce a podcast. In 2006 and 2007 the show was hosted by Chris Doelle.

Former NFL RB Bam Morris played for the Copperheads in 2006.

== Legal trouble ==
The Copperheads were accused by Katy Independent School District of not paying their rent for the season when they were at the Merrell Center playing as the Katy Copperheads (Katy I.S.D. owns the Merrell Center). At the end of the season, they owed Katy I.S.D. US$38,892.43. The owner, Bryan Blake would later pay the money in February 2007. In order to do this, he had to sell some of the Texas Copperheads ownership, to the owner of the Austin Wranglers, Doug McGregor. Afterwards, Katy I.S.D gave Blake back $38,000 worth of supplies. The Copperheads moved out of Katy to Cypress to play in the Berry Center as a result.

== Season-by-season ==
Season records
Season	W	L	T	Finish	Playoff results
Katy Copperheads (NIFL)
2006	11	3	0	1st Pacific South	Won PC Quarterfinals (Beaumont); Lost PC Semifinals (Rapid City)
Texas Copperheads (af2)
2007	2	14	0	4th NC Southwest	--
2008	2	14	0	5th NC Southwest	--
Totals	16	31	0	(including playoffs)	
