= Tito Wooten =

American football player (born 1971)

No. 28, 29
- Position: Safety

Personal information
- Born: December 12, 1971 (age 54); Goldsboro, North Carolina, U.S.
- Listed height: 6 ft 1 in (1.85 m)
- Listed weight: 195 lb (88 kg)

Career information
- High school: Goldsboro
- College: North Carolina
- Supplemental draft: 1994: 4th round

Career history
- New York Giants (1994–1998); Indianapolis Colts (1999); Greensboro Revolution (2006)

Career NFL statistics
- Tackles: 324
- Interceptions: 8
- Touchdowns: 3
- Stats at Pro Football Reference

Tito J. Wooten (born December 12, 1971) is an American former professional football player who was a safety in the National Football League (NFL) for the New York Giants and Indianapolis Colts from 1994 to 1999. He played college football for the North Carolina Tar Heels before being selected by the Giants in the fourth round of the 1994 NFL draft in the Supplemental Draft. Wooten also played for the Indianapolis Colts. During his NFL career, he played in 83 games, starting 47, as a free safety.

Tito would make a return to professional football, by playing for the Greensboro Revolution of the National Indoor Football League in 2006.

== NFL career statistics ==
Legend
	Led the league
**Bold**	Career high

=== Regular season ===
Year	Team	Games		Tackles				Interceptions				Fumbles			
Year	Team	GP	GS	Comb	Solo	Ast	Sck	Int	Yds	TD	Lng	FF	FR	Yds	TD
1994	NYG	16	2	20	16	4	0.0	0	0	0	0	0	0	0	0
1995	NYG	16	3	48	36	12	0.0	1	38	0	38	0	1	0	**1**
1996	NYG	13	12	65	49	16	0.0	1	35	0	35	**1**	1	**54**	**1**
1997	NYG	16	16	**89**	**60**	**29**	0.0	**5**	**146**	**1**	**61**	0	1	0	0
1998	NYG	14	13	74	**60**	14	**3.0**	0	0	0	0	0	0	0	0
1999	IND	8	1	28	20	8	0.0	1	4	0	4	0	**2**	0	0
		83	47	324	241	83	3.0	8	223	1	61	1	5	54	2

=== Playoffs ===
Year	Team	Games		Tackles				Interceptions				Fumbles			
Year	Team	GP	GS	Comb	Solo	Ast	Sck	Int	Yds	TD	Lng	FF	FR	Yds	TD
1997	NYG	1	1	4	3	1	0.0	0	0	0	0	0	0	0	0
		1	1	4	3	1	0.0	0	0	0	0	0	0	0	0
