= Cornerstone Fellowship =

- Cornerstone Fellowship
- 37.703917°N 121.810309°W
- Country: United States
- Denomination: Christian
- Website: cornerstoneweb.org

History
- Founded: 1992

Cornerstone Fellowship is a non-denominational, multi-site Christian church serving the East Bay area of San Francisco, US.

In 2020 the church had five physical locations in Livermore, Brentwood, Hayward, in Walnut Creek, and Danville, California. The church reports that every week, about 10,000 people join one of their services either in person or online.

== History ==
The Cornerstone Fellowship started in 1992 when Steve Madsen resigned from a church and started his own Bible Study in his house. His first study was the book of Galatians. In the same year, the group organized itself into a church.

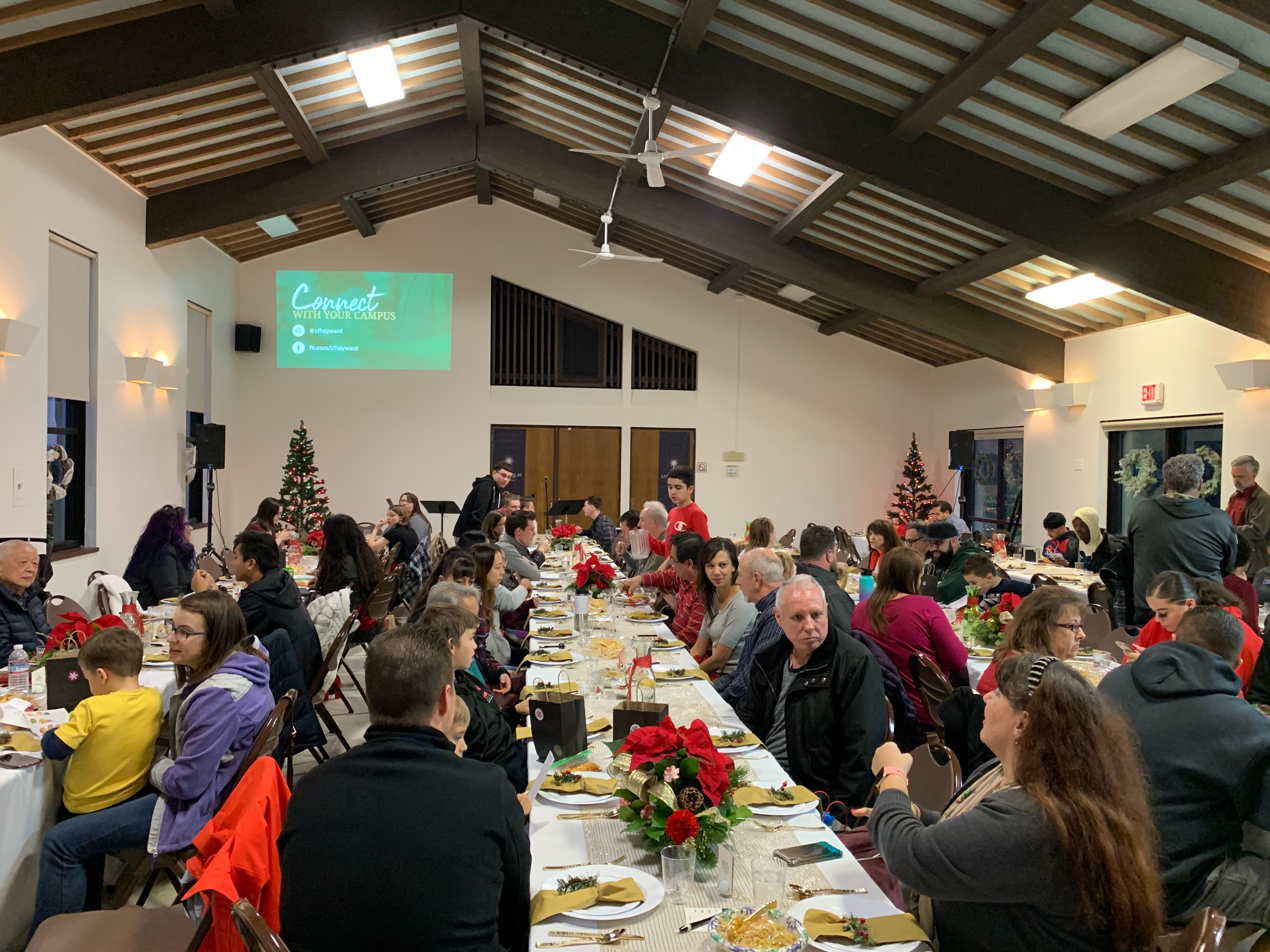
A free dinner service hosted by Cornerstone Fellowship's Hayward Location in Hayward, California.

Cornerstone Fellowship met in a rented hall, going from one, to two, to eventually three services. At that time a former indoor soccer facility was offered for sale at half the previous price. In 2004, the church purchased the building and converted it into a 24,000 square feet facility. In 2008, CF launched its campus in Brentwood, with a goal to continue expanding its Livermore campus. However, in 2011, its focus shifted to create a network of locations rather than one large central campus. According to Collin Lucas, the CFO at the time, the goal was to simplify and home in on making disciples for Jesus.

On 24 March 2018, the new Brentwood building was set to open for the church community to use. The previous Brentwood location was Freedom High School.

In January 2016, CF launched their Walnut Creek location by merging with an existing church named Life-Gate. Life-Gate had reached out to Cornerstone Fellowship before in order to "talk about options". After purchasing it, CF stated its goal was to raise funds in order to fix up the "tired" building and to find a permanent location for the Hayward congregation.

== Community, activities, and care ==
On February 10, 2017 CF co-organized a free Night to Shine Prom at the Alameda County Fairgrounds.

On February 2, 2020, the Livermore location hosted an event fundraiser to provide for the housing, mental care, school, and medical needs for children.

On February 7, 2020 with the San Ramon and Walnut Creek locations, CF hosted another free Night to Shine Prom for people with special needs. In partnership with Walnut Creek Presbyterian Church, CF organized the event and contributed 250 volunteers.

CF Brentwood has held a 10-week course "Equip to Care" course led by professional counselors.

On October 6, 2020, CF hosted the 8th Annual Missing Man Ministry fall dinner banquet.

CF has also partnered with other churches to host a homeless refuge in Livermore and has set up a closet that provides clean underwear, socks, and clothes for the refuge.

=== Charitable giving ===
In 2018, CF gave a total of $1.5 million to local and global non-profits, charities, outreach, and ministries.

In response to the 2010 Haiti earthquake, CF sent a contractor to help rebuild the community.

=== Response to COVID-19 and church online ===
In a response to the Coronavirus, Executive Pastor Chris Stockhaus, announced that CF was temporarily moving to their existing Church Online platform (hosted by Life.Church), in order to care for the health of the community, specifically the elderly.

== Mission, values, and beliefs ==
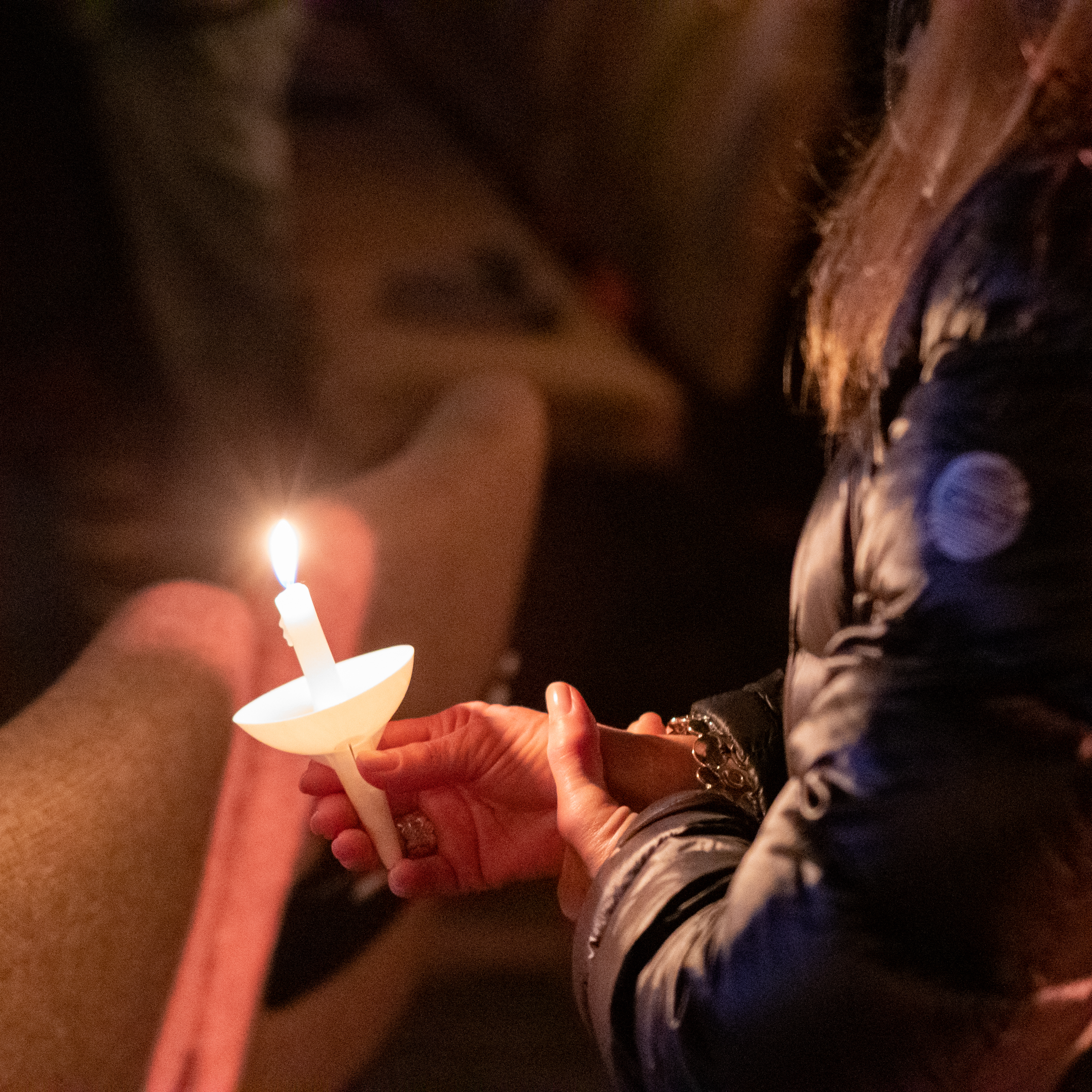
Candles held during Candlelight Christmas service

Cornerstone Fellowship states that their objective is to help their followers take their next step with Jesus and their vision is to repair the spiritual fabric of the East Bay. They intend to accomplish this through their multi-site model and online church presence.

The Church's core values are Outreach, Generosity, Community, Care, and Equipping.

Their Statement of Faith lists beliefs including:

- Trinity: God eternally is existent in three persons, co-equal and co-eternal.
- Biblical inspiration: That the Bible is the written Word of God to humans. Humans wrote it, under the guidance of the Holy Spirit.
- Image of God (Imago Dei): Humans are created in the spiritual image of God, to be like God in character.
- Eternity: People were created to exist forever
- Church: The universal church is the spiritual body of believers with Christ as the head, and that many different denominations within the universal church worship Jesus Christ.

CF states that, on non-essential beliefs, there is liberty. They state that these beliefs do not prevent salvation.

=== Young Earth Views ===
During the You Asked For It series of sermons in 2018, CF presented three different views on Genesis Chapter 1 and the Biblical story of creation. They stated that these views that are non-essential beliefs, saying that the controversy comes with understanding the context of how this chapter should be interpreted.

The first is a literal six-day reading, Young Earth creationism.

The second is Old Earth Creationism, where God created things by instantaneous command, but which occurred over long periods of time.

Lastly, is the third view of Evolutionary Creationism, or theistic evolution, where God guided and continues to guide the process of evolution, as He does with the rest of the Universe and laws of natures. This makes a distinction from the non-theistic Philosophy of science component of evolution.
