= Southern Oregon Heat =

American indoor football team

- Founded: 2000
- Folded: 2001
- Team history: Southern Oregon Heat (2001)
- Based in: Central Point, Oregon at Compton Arena
- Home arena: Compton Arena (2001)
- League: National Indoor Football League (2001)
- Colors: Navy Blue, Orange, White

Personnel
- Head coach: Eric VanderWegen
- General manager: Kevin Wells
- Owner: Kevin Wells

The Southern Oregon Heat was a professional indoor football team based out of Medford, Oregon, founded in 2000. They were a member of the National Indoor Football League and played their home games at Compton Arena (now the Seven Feathers Event Center) at the Jackson County Expo & Fairgrounds in Central Point, Oregon, affectionately called "The Inferno". The original franchise was owned by Kevin Wells.

== History ==
The Heat were founded on July 1, 2000, by Sutherlin, Oregon, businessman Kevin Wells bringing professional indoor football to the Rogue Valley for the first time. Their logo was designed by Mike Lacey and looks strikingly similar to that of the New England Patriots. They were originally to have become a member of the American Indoor Football League, but opted for the NIFL instead. They had two head coaches during their one season with the NIFL. The starting quarterback throughout the season was Eric VanderWegen, who would later become head coach midway through the season. The team amassed a record of only 1–13 (1–7 at home and 0–6 on the road) and their main geographic rivals were the Yakima Shockwave. Their only victory of record came in a 22-19 win over the Sioux City Bandits (now of the National Arena League). The team averaged an attendance of only 1,469 fans. The team failed to pay its rental fees to the Expo before the final scheduled home game of the season and were forced to cancel that game, which was a forfeit loss. They essentially ceased operations after their last road game.

They were to have resurfaced as the Eugene Mercury in 2002, but owner Wells was unable to find a new owner and the team folded before the season started. Wells disappeared from the public shortly after the team folded.
