= Colorado Wild Riders =

- Founded: 2006
- Folded: 2007
- Team history: Colorado Wild Riders (2007)
- Based in: Monument, Colorado at the Colorado Sports Center
- Home arena: Colorado Sports Center (2007)
- League: National Indoor Football League (2007)
- Colors: Red, blue, purple, gray

Personnel
- Head coach: Floyd Johnson

The Colorado Wild Riders were a 2007 expansion team from the now defunct National Indoor Football League (NIFL). They played their home games at the Colorado Sports Center in Monument, Colorado (part of greater Colorado Springs, Colorado).

== History ==
Proposed Colorado Candoos logo

The team was originally known as the Colorado Candoos and was going to play at the Norris-Penrose Event Center. The Wild Riders played as the home team in an outdoor game against the Denver Aviators in Denver. The game was supposed to be the first of a doubleheader, which was moved to an outdoor field after the indoor one was not set up for football. The Wild Riders folded on May 11, along with several other league owned teams, but were resurrected for one more game at Wyoming. The league called the visiting team the Wild Riders, but the team played with the Castle Rocks uniforms and the team was composed of Colorado "All-Stars".

== Season-by-season ==
Season records
Season	W	L	T	Finish	Playoff results
*2007	0	1	0	T-3rd Pacific Northern	--

* = Current Standing
