= Becky Zerlentes =

American boxer (1970–2005)

Personal information
- Born: Becky Zerlentes; July 8, 1970 Denver, Colorado, U.S.
- Died: April 3, 2005 (aged 34) Denver, Colorado, U.S.
- Weight: Lightweight

Boxing career

Becky Zerlentes (July 8, 1970 – April 3, 2005) was a professor of geography, amateur boxer, and martial artist.

== Personal life ==
Zerlentes was a professor of geography and economics at Front Range Community College's Larimer County campus. Zerlentes earned her master's and PhD in geography at the University of Illinois at Urbana-Champaign. She had a wide variety of interests, including martial arts, boxing, synchronized swimming, ice skating, and academic pursuits. She was married to fellow economics professor, Dr. Stephan Weiler.

== Martial arts accomplishments ==
Zerlentes was a black belt in Goshin Jitsu, which she earned in 1996. She often told her students that she started training with Goshin Jitsu after coming to one of the club parties. She later became the chief instructor of the club from 1998 to 1999. Zerlentes also earned a black belt in Danzan Ryu Jujitsu and was certified in Okazaki restorative massage. Zerlentes enjoyed teaching, particularly self-defense, something she believed was critical for women to learn.

== Amateur boxing career ==
Zerlentes had a record of 6 wins and 4 losses. She won a regional Golden Gloves in 2002.

== Death ==
On April 2, 2005, Zerlentes was participating in the Colorado State Boxing Senior Female Championships at the Denver Coliseum in Denver, Colorado. She was knocked out in the third round by her opponent, Heather Schmitz. Zerlentes fell unconscious, and never regained consciousness. Zerlentes is the first woman known to have died of injuries sustained during a sanctioned boxing match in the United States. According to the Denver County coroner, the cause of death was blunt force trauma to the head.
