= Green Cove Lions =

Logo

General information
- Founded: 2006
- Folded: 2007
- Headquartered: Green Cove Springs, Florida at the Paul E. Reinhold Agricultural Fairgrounds
- Colors: Red, silver, purple

Team history
- Green Cove Lions (2007)

Home fields
- Paul E. Reinhold Agricultural Fairgrounds (2007)

League / conference affiliations
- National Indoor Football League (2007)

The Green Cove Lions were an indoor football team intended to be based in Green Cove Springs, Florida. They played briefly in the National Indoor Football League in 2007, but ceased to exist before ever playing a home game.

The Green Cove Lions' registered agent was former National Football League player Cleveland Gary. The Lions evidently originated with the Jacksonville Stallions, a planned NIFL team that attempted to get a contract to play at Jacksonville Veterans Memorial Arena in Jacksonville in 2006. This never came through, but the team may have been related to the later Jacksonville Pelicans, another ephemeral NIFL team who listed their home address in the suburb of Green Cove Springs. The Pelicans evidently rebranded as the Green Cove Lions for the 2007 season and paid a deposit to use the Clay County Fairgrounds arena in Green Cove Springs as their home stadium. However, they apparently determined that the arena would not be suitable for indoor football. The team played two away games before withdrawing from the rest of their schedule, and folded before ever playing a home game.

== By season ==
Season records
Season	W	L	T	Finish	Playoff results
2007	0	3	0	3rd Atlantic Southeastern	--
