= Tri-Valley Ranchers =

Logo

General information
- Founded: 2006
- Folded: 2007
- Headquartered: Pleasanton, California at the Amador Pavilion
- Colors: Green, red

Personnel
- Head coach: Michael Greer
- President: Eddie Diflorio

Team history
- Tri-Valley Ranchers (2007)

Home fields
- Amador Pavilion (2007)

League / conference affiliations
- National Indoor Football League (2007)

The Tri-Valley Ranchers was a 2007 expansion team from the National Indoor Football League (NIFL). They played their home games at the Amador Pavilion in Pleasanton, California. Originally, there were supposed to be two different NIFL expansion teams with the Alameda Action and the Anaheim Street Boys, but they came together to form one team, the Alameda Street Boys. Later on, they changed their name again to represent the Tri-Valley region.

== Season-by-season ==
Season records
Season	W	L	T	Finish	Playoff results
2007	1	1	0	4th Pacific	--
