= Tennessee River Sharks =

The Tennessee River Sharks were a professional indoor football team based in East Ridge, Tennessee, a suburb of Chattanooga. They were part of the now-defunct National Indoor Football League (NIFL) and played their home games at Camp Jordan Arena.

== History ==
The team was established in 2006 by owner Jamie LaMunyon, who had a history of starting and folding minor league sports teams. The general manager and head coach of the River Sharks was Chris Carter, who had previous experience in coaching but was drawn into the turbulent management of the team.

The River Sharks managed to start the 2006 season with a 5-2 record. However, financial difficulties quickly plagued the team. Players were reportedly unpaid, and the financial instability of the franchise became apparent. The team eventually folded before completing their inaugural season. The team's downfall was marked by a significant loss in Cincinnati, after which the team ceased operations.

== Legacy ==
Following the disbandment of the team, Coach Chris Carter distanced himself from the situation and later took on a role as a high school football coach. The Tennessee River Sharks are remembered as a cautionary tale of the instability that often plagued lower-tier professional sports teams during this era. Carter moved his coaching career to Garinger High School, where he developed his skills as a football coach, turning around a 0-60 team to a Queen City Region Championship in his second year.<ref>"Garinger High School." Wikipedia. Retrieved January 18, 2025, from Garinger High School He later moved to Lake Marion High School, where he gained recognition for his leadership and coaching prowess, leading Lake Marion to its first-ever Lower State Tile Game in 2015. In 2019, he was hired as the head football coach and athletic director, and he again led a struggling 0-22 team and broke another losing streak at Edisto High School. His tenure there was marked by significant improvements in the team's performance.<ref>Clark, Chris. (2019). "Edisto football hires Carter from Lake Marion." The Times and Democrat. Retrieved from https://thetandd.com/sports/edisto-football-hires-carter-from-lake-marion/article_1f6fed66-5b9f-58c5-b4c9-72e6b474ff7e.html.

In 2023, Carter was appointed head football coach at the Orangeburg-Wilkinson High School, where he continued to build a reputation for turning around struggling football programs. Leading Orangeburg Wilkinson to their first playoff win in 28 years.<ref>Holl, David. (2025). "Orangeburg-Wilkinson Bruins Break a 28-Year Drought, Dominate Aynor in First Round of SCHSL." Medium. Retrieved January 18, 2025, from https://medium.com/@DavidHoll75/orangeburg-wilkinson-bruins-break-a-28-year-drought-dominate-aynor-in-first-round-of-schsl-d29e735278eb.
