= Fort Myers Tarpons =

Arena football team in the National Indoor Football League

General information
- Founded: 2006
- Folded: 2007
- Headquartered: Fort Myers, Florida at the Lee County Civic Arena
- Colors: Blue, sea blue, white

Personnel
- Head coach: Bernard Edwards

Team history
- Fort Myers Tarpons (2007)

Home fields
- Lee County Civic Arena (2007)

League / conference affiliations
- National Indoor Football League (2007)

The Fort Myers Tarpons was a 2007 expansion team from the National Indoor Football League. They played their home games at the Lee County Civic Arena in Fort Myers, Florida. They won both of their games, one at home and one on the road, before suddenly folding. The team was the second attempt at an arena/indoor football team since the Florida Firecats of af2 (2002–2009) and followed by the Florida Tarpons (not related).

== Season-by-season ==
Season records
Season	W	L	T	Finish	Playoff results
2007	2	0	0	N/A	–
