= Charleston Sandsharks =

American indoor football team

General information
- Founded: 2006
- Folded: 2007
- Headquartered: Charleston, South Carolina at the North Charleston Coliseum
- Colors: Blue, gray, white

Personnel
- General manager: Al Bannister
- Head coach: John Patterson
- President: Rick Johnson

Team history
- Charleston Sandsharks (2006)

Home fields
- North Charleston Coliseum (2006)

League / conference affiliations
- National Indoor Football League (2006)

The Charleston Sandsharks were a professional indoor football team based in North Charleston, South Carolina, a suburb of the metropolitan area of Charleston, South Carolina, with home games at the North Charleston Coliseum.

The team played a single season in the National Indoor Football League (NIFL) in 2006. In the final game of their season, the team ran out of footballs and had to get fans to return balls that had ended up in the stands. Though they won the game, the NIFL later ruled that the Sandsharks had used ineligible players, and forfeited the game to Montgomery. The Sandsharks ownership had announced that they would not participate in the playoffs to save money, and Montgomery took their place in the playoffs.

The team left the NIFL and announced they were joining the World Indoor Football League for 2007 before withdrawing from the start-up league. They then were announced as members of the American Indoor Football Association as the Carolina Sandsharks, but the owners decided to not play for financial reasons.

== Season-by-season records ==
Season records
Season	W	L	T	Finish	Playoff results
2006	7	7	0	3rd AC Eastern	—
