= Colorado Castle Rocks =

American indoor football team

Logo

General information
- Founded: 2006
- Folded: 2007
- Headquartered: Castle Rock, Colorado at the Douglas County Events Center
- Colors: Black, sand tan, orange, sea blue

Team history
- Colorado Castle Rocks (2007)

Home fields
- Douglas County Events Center (2007)

League / conference affiliations
- National Indoor Football League (2007)

The Colorado Castle Rocks was a 2007 expansion team from the National Indoor Football League. They were to play their home games at the Douglas County Events Center in Castle Rock, Colorado, but no home games were played, and their only game was a large defeat against the Wyoming Cavalry.

== Season-by-season ==
Season records
Season	W	L	T	Finish	Playoff results
2007	0	1	0	T-3rd Pacific Northern	--
