= Florida Scorpions =

Indoor football team

General information
- Founded: 2006
- Folded: 2011
- Headquartered: Bradenton, Florida at the Manatee Civic Center
- Colors: Purple, silver, black

Personnel
- Head coach: L. Caldwell

Team history
- Sarasota Knights (2007); Florida Knights (2008); Florida Scorpions (2011)

Home fields
- Manatee Civic Center (2007-2011)

League / conference affiliations
- National Indoor Football League (2007); American Professional Football League (2008, 2011)

The Florida Scorpions (originally the "Florida Knights") were an indoor football team. They were a 2008 expansion member of the American Professional Football League. They played their home games at the Manatee Civic Center. They played their first season in the National Indoor Football League as the Sarasota Knights.

== Season-by-season ==
Season records
Season	W	L	T	Finish	Playoff results
Sarasota Knights (NIFL)
2007	0	2	0	5th Atlantic Florida	--
Florida Knights/Scorpions (APFL)
2008	2	3	0	3rd Southern	--
2011	0	1	0	6th APFL	--
