= Patrick Palmer =

Patrick Palmer may refer to:

== Sportspeople ==
- Patrick Palmer (rugby union) (born 1988), Welsh rugby union player
- Pat Palmer (rugby union) (born 1962), Canadian rugby player
- Pat Palmer (boxer) (1914–1988), English boxer

== Others ==
- Patrick Palmer (British Army officer) (1933–1999), British Army general
- Patrick Palmer (politician) (1889–1971), Irish Fine Gael politician from Kerry
- Patrick Palmer (astronomer), American astronomer, Helen B. Warner Prize for Astronomy
- Pat Palmer, the current owner of Citizendium
