= Industry Hills Expo Center =

Event venue in Industry, California

Coordinates: 34.0262°N 117.9385°W

The Industry Hills Expo Center is a 125-acre event venue (51 ha) in the City of Industry, California, United States. The multi-purpose arena seats over 5,000 spectators and was home to the Los Angeles Lynx of the National Indoor Football League. Built in 1981, the venue has other smaller buildings along with outdoor horse arenas.

The venue is one of the top venues for motorcycle speedway in the United States.

== Los Angeles Lynx ==
Los Angeles Lynx
- Founded: 2006
- Folded: 2007
- Team history: Los Angeles Lynx (2007)
- Based in: Industry, California at the Industry Hills Expo Center
- Home arena: Industry Hills Expo Center (2007)
- League: National Indoor Football League (2007)
- Colors: Red, Black, White

Personnel
- Head coach: Anthony Bartley
- Team president: Anthony Bartley

The Los Angeles Lynx were a 2007 expansion team from the National Indoor Football League (NIFL). They played their home games at the Industry Hills Expo Center. This was one of a number of teams that were dissolved by the NIFL in a mid-season purge during its inaugural season. The Lynx's last game was a home loss to the San Diego Shockwave on April 28, 2007.
