= Greensboro Revolution =

Team in National Indoor Football League

Logo

General information
- Founded: 2006
- Folded: 2008
- Headquartered: Greensboro, North Carolina at the Greensboro Coliseum Complex
- Colors: Blue, red, yellow

Personnel
- Head coach: Mitchell Jenkins

Team history
- Greensboro Revolution (2006-2008)

Home fields
- Greensboro Coliseum (2006-2008)

League / conference affiliations
- National Indoor Football League (2006-2008)

The Greensboro Revolution was a team in the National Indoor Football League (NIFL) that began play as a 2006 expansion team. They played their home games at the Greensboro Coliseum in Greensboro, North Carolina.

Former New York Giants DB, Tito Wooten would play for the Revolution in 2006.

On January 23, 2008, it was announced that the team had folded, mainly due to low attendance numbers and problems off the playing field.

== Season-by-season ==
Season records
Season	W	L	T	Finish	Playoff results
2006	5	9	0	4th Atlantic Eastern	--
2007	7	3	0	2nd Atlantic	--
Totals	12	12	0		
