= Fort Worth Sixers =

US football team 2006 - 2007

Fort Worth Sixers/Regulators
Logo

General information
- Founded: 2006
- Folded: 2007
- Headquartered: Fort Worth, Texas at the Cowtown Coliseum
- Colors: Orange, Blue, Gold

Personnel
- Owner: National Indoor Football League
- CEO: Will Williams
- General manager: Will Williams
- Head coach: Will Williams
- President: Will Williams

Team history
- Fort Worth Sixers (2007)

Home fields
- Cowtown Coliseum (2007)

League / conference affiliations
- National Indoor Football League (2007)

The Fort Worth Sixers were a professional indoor football team founded as 2007 expansion franchise of the National Indoor Football League. The team struggled on the field during its single season in existence, and franchise folded with the league at the end of the shortened 2007 season.
