= Denver Aviators =

Logo

General information
- Founded: 2006
- Folded: 2007
- Headquartered: Denver, Colorado at the Denver Coliseum
- Colors: Burgundy, Silver, White

Personnel
- Head coach: Schuyler Anderson

Team history
- Denver Aviators (2007)

Home fields
- Denver Coliseum (2007)

League / conference affiliations
- National Indoor Football League (2007)

The Denver Aviators was a 2007 expansion member of the National Indoor Football League (NIFL). They played their home games at the Denver Coliseum in Denver, Colorado.

== Season-by-season ==
Season records
Season	W	L	T	Finish	Playoff results
2007	1	1	0	2nd Pacific Northern	--
