= San Diego Shockwave =

American football team

Logo

General information
- Founded: 2006
- Folded: 2007
- Headquartered: San Diego, California at Viejas Arena
- Colors: Black, Maroon, White
- Mascot: Shock and Wave

Personnel
- Owners: Jeff Sprowls and Robert Sprowls
- Head coach: Robert Bees
- President: Jeff Sprowls

Team history
- San Diego Shockwave (2007)

Home fields
- Viejas Arena (2007)

League / conference affiliations
- National Indoor Football League (2007)

Championships
- League championships: 1; 2007

The San Diego Shockwave were an indoor football team based in San Diego, California, that competed in the National Indoor Football League. The team played its home games at Viejas Arena, home of the San Diego State Aztecs basketball teams. The Shockwave were founded as an expansion franchise in 2007.

The team was owned by former BYU player Jeff Sprowls and his father, Robert. The Shockwave finished the 2007 season 10–1 in the league and won the NIFL title, but the league itself experienced many difficulties as other teams folded. For 2008, the Shockwave ownership decided not to continue operations in the NIFL.

Some games were broadcast on XEPE, "San Diego 1700 AM." Chris Ello was the play-by-play announcer.

== 2007 season results ==
Date	Opponent	Result	Att.	Record
Regular Season
March 31	Los Angeles	W, 56–9	3,237	1–0
April 7	at Casper	L, 57–20	2,692	1–1
April 14	Beaumont	W, 46–9	2,379	2–1
April 21	Pomona	W, 61–32	3,473	3–1
April 28	at Los Angeles	W, 61–6	2,733	4–1
May 5	Los Angeles	W, 77–6	3,013	5–1
May 12	at San Bernardino	W, 56–15	N/A	6–1
May 26	Casper	W, 52–45	4,952	7–1
June 9	at Beaumont	W, 50–26	3,000	8–1
June 23	Tri–Valley	W, 33–24	2,933	9–1
June 30	San Bernardino	W, 56–0	2,987	10–1
