= National Indoor Football League =

Professional US football league

- National Indoor Football League logo
- Sport: Indoor football
- Founded: 2001; 25 years ago
- Folded: 2008; 18 years ago
- Country: United States
- Last champion: San Diego Shockwave
- Website: http://www.niflfootball.com

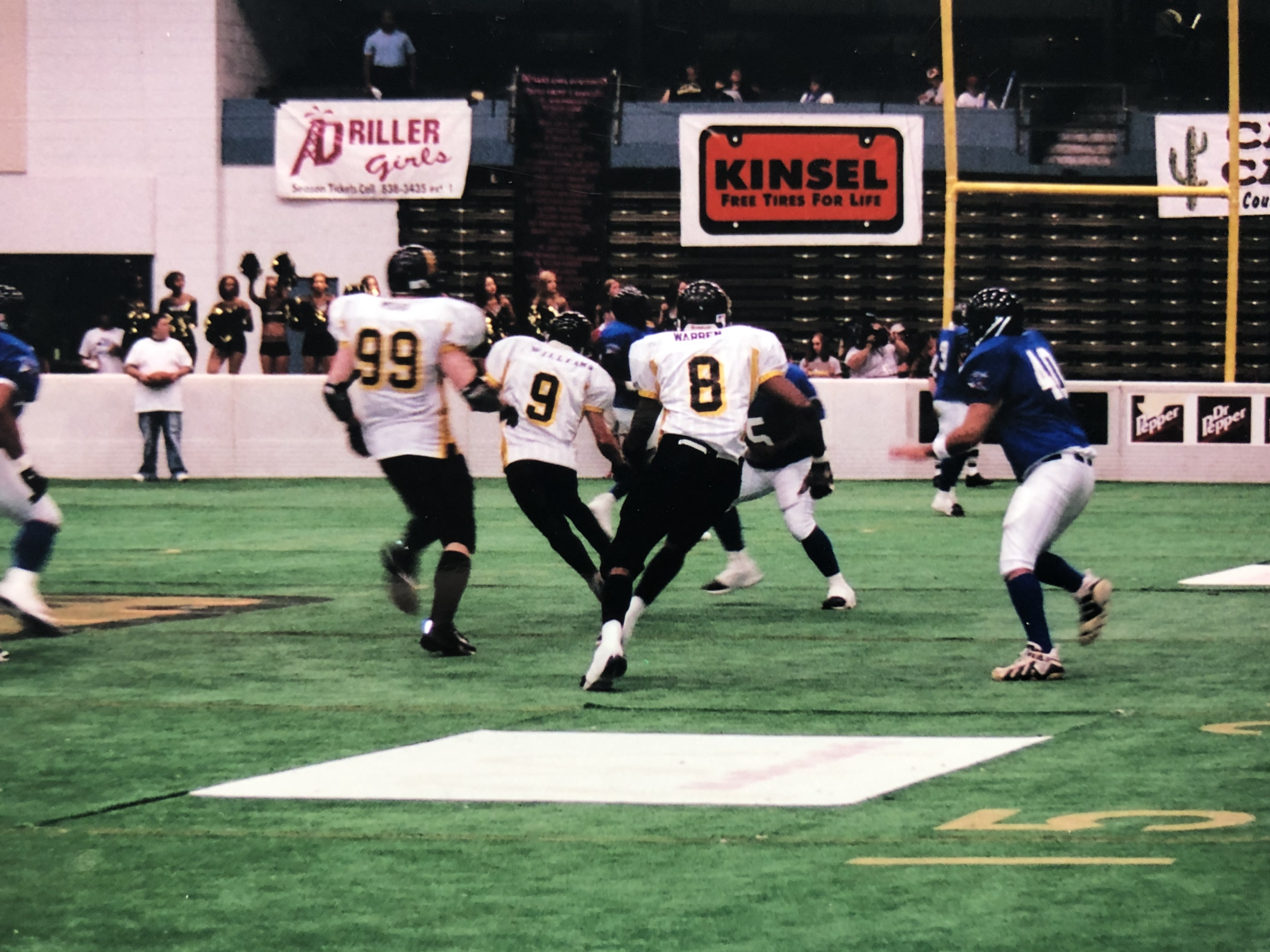
2004 Beaumont Drillers vs Waco Marshals

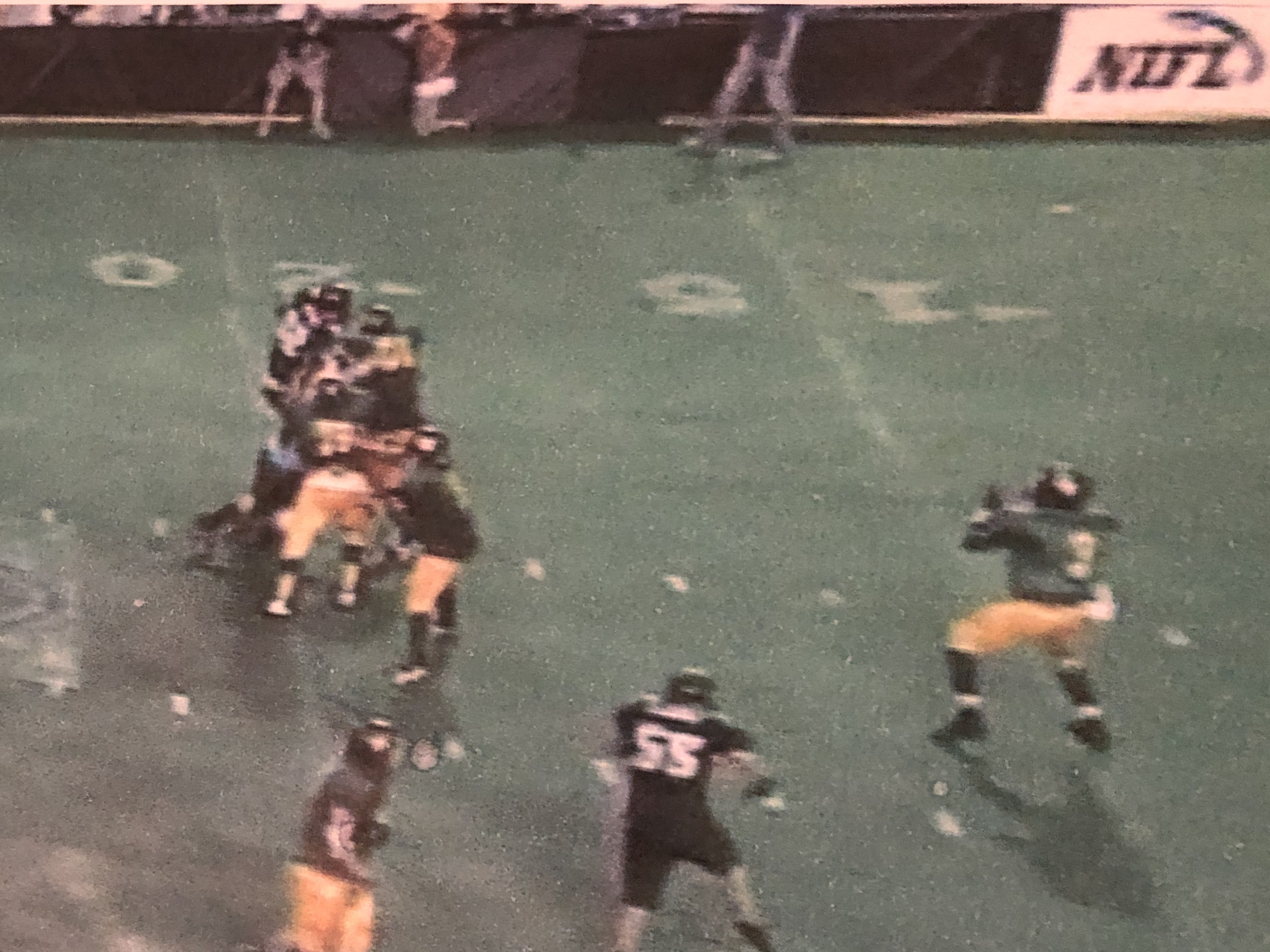
2007 San Antonio Steers vs Beaumont Drillers

The National Indoor Football League (NIFL) was a professional indoor football league in the United States. For their first six years, the league had teams in markets not covered by the Arena Football League; however, that changed briefly with their expansion into AFL markets such as Atlanta, Denver, San Antonio, Miami and Los Angeles. The league folded in 2008.

== History ==
The NIFL, based in Lafayette, Louisiana, was founded by Carolyn Shiver. The league started operations in 2001, with many teams coming from Indoor Football League being bought the previous year and folding operations. In 2002, the league added in the teams from the Indoor Professional Football League. 2003 was the most successful year for the league as 24 teams played a mostly complete schedule, with few cancellations.

Before the 2005 season, nine teams left the league to form United Indoor Football. That same year, the Intense Football League ceased operations and four teams from there joined the league. Those teams, however, left the league before the 2006 season started.

For the 2005 season, the NIFL had an agreement with NFL to handle referee assignment and training.

The 2006 season was the most chaotic for the league to that point. Ten expansion teams were added to the league, but nine of them had problems that reflected badly on the league. The most notable situation was the owner of the Montgomery Maulers firing the entire team. None of the ten expansion teams returned to the league for the next season.

The 2007 season started with the addition of several league-owned expansion teams, primarily to supplement games with the returning teams. However, the teams were all poorly funded and had problems fielding competitive squads. The San Diego Shockwave were declared the official league champion. The league then officially folded prior to the 2008 season.

== Former teams ==
=== Teams that left the NIFL to join (or planned to join) another league ===
- Beaumont Drillers – joined APFL in 2008 and has since folded.
- Evansville BlueCats – joined United Indoor Football and folded following 2007 season.
- Everett Hawks – joined the AF2 in 2007 and has since folded.
- Fayetteville Guard – moved to American Indoor Football Association, and have since folded.
- Fort Wayne Freedom – joined United Indoor Football, then had assets bought out by Fort Wayne Fusion of AF2.
- Greenville Riverhawks – moved to American Indoor Football Association as Johnstown Riverhawks and have since folded.
- Katy Copperheads – moved to AF2 as Texas Copperheads and has since folded.
- Lexington Horsemen – Joined United Indoor Football then AF2 later changed to Kentucky Horsemen and finally folded.
- Montgomery Maulers – moved to American Indoor Football Association as Montgomery Bears and have since folded.
- Odessa Roughnecks – moved to Indoor Football League, and have since folded.
- Ohio Valley Greyhounds – moved to Indoor Football League, and have since folded.
- Omaha Beef – now in National Arena League
- Osceola Football – moved to World Indoor Football League as Osceola Ghostriders, and have since folded.
- River City Rage – moved to Indoor Football League, and have since folded.
- Rome Renegades – joined American Indoor Football League, then left for World Indoor Football League, but folded before playing a single game there.
- San Angelo Stampede – moved to Indoor Football League, and have since folded.
- San Diego Shockwave – Has announced going on hiatus for 2008 but planned on joining another league for 2009 and never did.
- Sarasota Knights – Moved to APFL as Florida Knights, and have since folded.
- Sioux City Bandits – now in National Arena League.
- Sioux Falls Storm – now in Indoor Football League.
- Tri-Cities Fever- moved to AF2 and then Indoor Football League and are now dormant.
- Tupelo FireAnts – joined United Indoor Football, then folded after one season there.
- Wyoming Cavalry (Casper, Wyoming) – moved to Indoor Football League, and have since folded.

=== Defunct teams/failed expansion ===
- Arkansas Stars
- Atlanta Thoroughbreds
- Atlantic City CardSharks
- Austin Knights
- Austin Rockers
- Bay Bandits
- Big Sky Thunder
- Billings Mavericks
- Bismarck Roughriders
- Black Hills Red Dogs
- Charleston Sandsharks
- Cincinnati Marshals
- Colorado Castle Rocks
- Colorado Venom
- Colorado Wild Riders
- Columbia Stingers
- Dayton Bulldogs
- Dayton Warbirds
- Daytona Beach Hawgs
- Denver Aviators
- Eugene Mercury
- Florida Frenzy
- Fort Myers Tarpons
- Fort Worth Sixers
- Green Cove Lions – Evidently formerly the Jacksonville Stallions, they folded in 2007 before ever playing a home game.
- Greensboro Revolution
- Hammond Heroes
- Houma Bayou Bucks
- Houston Wild Riders
- Jacksonville Stallions – folded before playing a game, and evidently became the Green Cove Lions.
- Johnstown J Dogs
- Kissimmee Kreatures
- La Crosse Night Train
- Lake Charles Land Sharks
- Lakeland Thunderbolts – won American Indoor Football Association 2007
- Lincoln Capitols
- Long Beach Surf
- Los Angeles Lynx
- Louisiana Bayou Beast
- Louisiana Rangers
- Louisiana Swashbucklers
- Lubbock Gunslingers
- Lubbock Lone Stars
- Miami Vice Squad
- Mississippi Fire Dogs
- Mobile Seagulls
- Myrtle Beach Stingrays
- New Jersey XTreme
- Oklahoma Crude
- Pomona Cool Riders
- Port St. Lucie Mustangs
- Pueblo Pistols
- Rapid City Flying Aces
- River Cities LocoMotives
- River City Renegades
- San Bernardino Bucking Bulls
- St. Joseph Cyclones
- San Antonio Steers
- Southern Oregon Heat
- Staten Island Xtreme
- Tennessee Riverhawks
- Tennessee River Sharks
- Tennessee ThunderCats
- Tri-City Diesel
- Tri-Valley Ranchers
- Twin City Gators
- Utah Express
- Utah Rattlers
- Utah Warriors
- Waco Marshals
- Wichita Falls Thunder
- Winston-Salem Energy
- Yakima Shockwave

== Indoor Bowl games ==
Year	Winner	Loser	Score
2001	Mississippi Fire Dogs	Wyoming Cavalry	55–21
2002	Ohio Valley Greyhounds	Billings Outlaws	55–52
2003	Ohio Valley Greyhounds	Utah Warriors	45–37
2004	Lexington Horsemen	Sioux Falls Storm	59–38
2005	Tri-Cities Fever	Rome Renegades	47–31
2006	Billings Outlaws	Fayetteville Guard	59–44
2007	San Diego Shockwave	No playoff	

== Notable NIFL players and coaches ==
Notable players who played in the NIFL include: Green Bay Packers head coach Matt LaFleur, Miami Dolphins executive Champ Kelly, Buffalo Bills running back Fred Jackson, New Orleans Saints quarterback John Fourcade, New York Giants defensive back Tito Wooten, St. Louis Rams Super Bowl champion Ron Carpenter, Pittsburgh Steelers Super Bowl running back Bam Morris and New Orleans Saints hall of famer Tyrone Hughes.

NFL draft picks that played in the NIFL include: Tyrone Hughes 1993 New Orleans Saints 5th; Tito Wooten 1994 New York Giants 4th; Bam Morris 1994 Pittsburgh Steelers 3rd; Pat Palmer 1998 Washington Redskins 6th; Mike Cawley 1996 Indianapolis Colts 6th; Steve Bellisari 2002 St. Louis Rams 6th; Sean Bennett 1999 New York Giants 4th; Mike Green 2000 Tennessee Titans 7th; Carl Greenwood 1995 New York Jets 5th; Brad Ottis 1994 Los Angeles Rams 2nd; Wilmont Perry 1998 New Orleans Saints 5th; Chris Floyd 1998 New England Patriots 3rd; Mareno Philyaw 2000 Atlanta Falcons 6th; Lance Olberding 1992 Cincinnati Bengals 7th; Marquette Smith 1996 Carolina Panthers 4th; Nicky Savoie 1997 New Orleans Saints 6th.

Notable head coaches in the NIFL include: Pro Football Hall of Famer Larry Little, Houston Oilers head coach Ed Biles, Washington Redskins quarterback Heath Shuler, New Orleans Saints quarterback John Fourcade and New York Giants linebacker Corey Miller.

NFL draft picks that coached in the NIFL include: Mike Siani 1972 Oakland Raiders 1st; Heath Shuler 1994 Washington Redskins 1st; Corey Miller 1991 New York Giants 6th; Marc Munford 1987 Denver Broncos 4th; Reggie Mathis 1979 New Orleans Saints 2nd; Chris Duliban 1986 Dallas Cowboys 12th; Marquette Smith 1996 Carolina Panthers 4th; Alexander Wright 1990 Dallas Cowboys 2nd.

== See also ==
- List of leagues of American football
- Indoor Bowl
