= George Takei =

American actor, author and activist (born 1937)

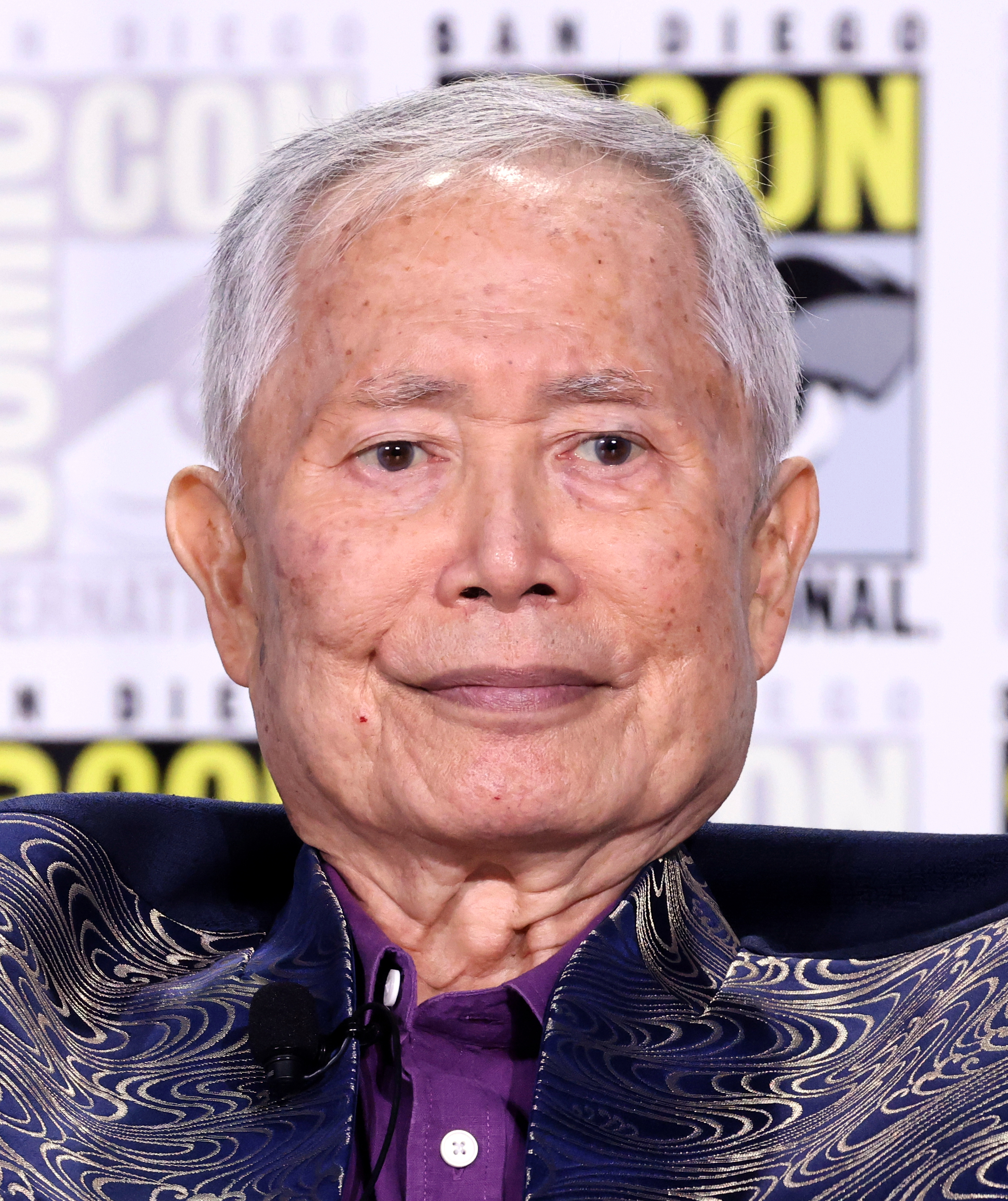
- Takei in 2025
- Born: Hosato Takei; April 20, 1937 (age 89); Los Angeles, California, U.S.
- Education: University of California, Berkeley (attended); University of California, Los Angeles (BA, MA)
- Occupations: Actor; author; activist
- Years active: 1955–present
- Political party: Democratic
- Spouse: Brad Altman (m. 2008)
- Website: www.georgetakei.com

George Takei (/təˈkeɪ/ tə-KAY; born Hosato Takei, (Note: Japanese: 武井 穂郷, Hepburn: Takei Hosato) April 20, 1937) is an American actor, author, and activist. He is known for his role as Hikaru Sulu, helmsman of the USS Enterprise in the Star Trek franchise.

Takei was born to Japanese American parents, with whom he lived in Tule Lake Segregation Center during World War II. He began pursuing acting in college, which led in 1965 to the role of Sulu, to which he returned periodically into the 1990s. Upon coming out as gay in 2005, he became a prominent proponent of LGBTQ rights and active in state and local politics. He has been a vocal advocate of the rights of immigrants, in part through his work on the 2012 Broadway show Allegiance, about the internment experience.

Takei spoke both English and Japanese growing up and remains fluent in both languages. He has won several awards and accolades for his work on human rights and Japan–United States relations, including his work with the Japanese American National Museum in Los Angeles, California.

== Early life ==
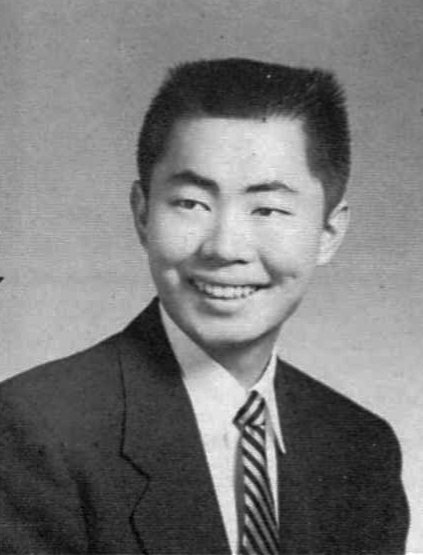
Takei in 1956

Takei was born Hosato Takei on April 20, 1937, in Los Angeles, California, to Japanese American parents Fumiko Emily Nakamura (born in Sacramento, California) and Takekuma Norman Takei (born in Yamanashi Prefecture), who worked in real estate. His father named him George after King George VI of the United Kingdom, whose coronation took place in 1937, shortly after Takei's birth. In 1942, following the signing of Executive Order 9066, the Takei family was forced to live in the converted horse stables of Santa Anita Park before being sent to the Rohwer War Relocation Center for internment in Rohwer, Arkansas. The internment camp was in swamplands and surrounded by barbed wire fences. The family was later transferred to the Tule Lake War Relocation Center in California for internment.

External videos
- Q&A interview with Takei on My Lost Freedom, Takei's children's book about his experiences in American internment camps, June 10, 2024, C-SPAN

Takei had several relatives living in Japan during World War II. Among them, he had an aunt and infant cousin who lived in Hiroshima and who were both killed during the atomic bombing that destroyed the city. In Takei's own words, "My aunt and baby cousin [were] found burnt in a ditch in Hiroshima." At the end of World War II, after leaving Tule internment camp, Takei's family was left without any bank accounts, home or family business; this left them unable to find any housing, so they lived on Skid Row, Los Angeles for five years. He attended Mount Vernon Junior High School and served as Boys Senior Board President at Los Angeles High School. He was a member of Boy Scout Troop 379 of the Koyasan Buddhist Temple.

Upon graduation from high school, Takei enrolled in the University of California, Berkeley, where he studied architecture. Later, he transferred to the University of California, Los Angeles, where he received a Bachelor of Arts in theater in 1960 and a Master of Arts in theater in 1964. He also attended the Shakespeare Institute at Stratford-upon-Avon in England and Sophia University in Tokyo. In Hollywood, he studied acting at the Desilu Workshop.

== Career ==
=== Early career ===
Takei began his career in Hollywood in the late 1950s, providing voiceover for characters in the English dubbing of the Japanese monster films Rodan (1956, US: 1957) and Godzilla Raids Again (1955, US: Gigantis the Fire Monster, 1959). He appeared in the anthology television series Playhouse 90, the Perry Mason episode "The Case of the Blushing Pearls" (both 1959), and a handful of times in Hawaiian Eye during the 1960–61 season, including an eponymous episode as Thomas Jefferson Chu. He originated the role of George in the musical Fly Blackbird!, but when the show traveled from Los Angeles to Off-Broadway the West Coast actors were forced to audition and the role went to William Sugihara instead. Eventually Sugihara had to give up the role and Takei closed out the show's final months.

Takei subsequently appeared alongside such actors as Frank Sinatra in Never So Few (uncredited, 1959), Richard Burton in Ice Palace, Jeffrey Hunter in Hell to Eternity (1960), Alec Guinness in A Majority of One (1961), James Caan in Red Line 7000 (1965), and Cary Grant in Walk, Don't Run (1966).

Takei starred as a landscaper of Japanese descent in "The Encounter", a 1964 episode of the Twilight Zone. CBS considered the episode's theme of US-Japanese hatred "too disturbing" to include when the series was syndicated. "The Encounter" was not seen after its initial airing until it was released on video in 1992 as part of the Treasures of the Twilight Zone collection.

Takei guest-starred in an episode of Mission: Impossible during that show's first season in 1966. He also appeared in two Jerry Lewis comedies, The Big Mouth (uncredited, 1967) and Which Way to the Front? (1970). Takei narrated the documentary The Japanese Sword as the Soul of the Samurai (1969).

=== Star Trek ===
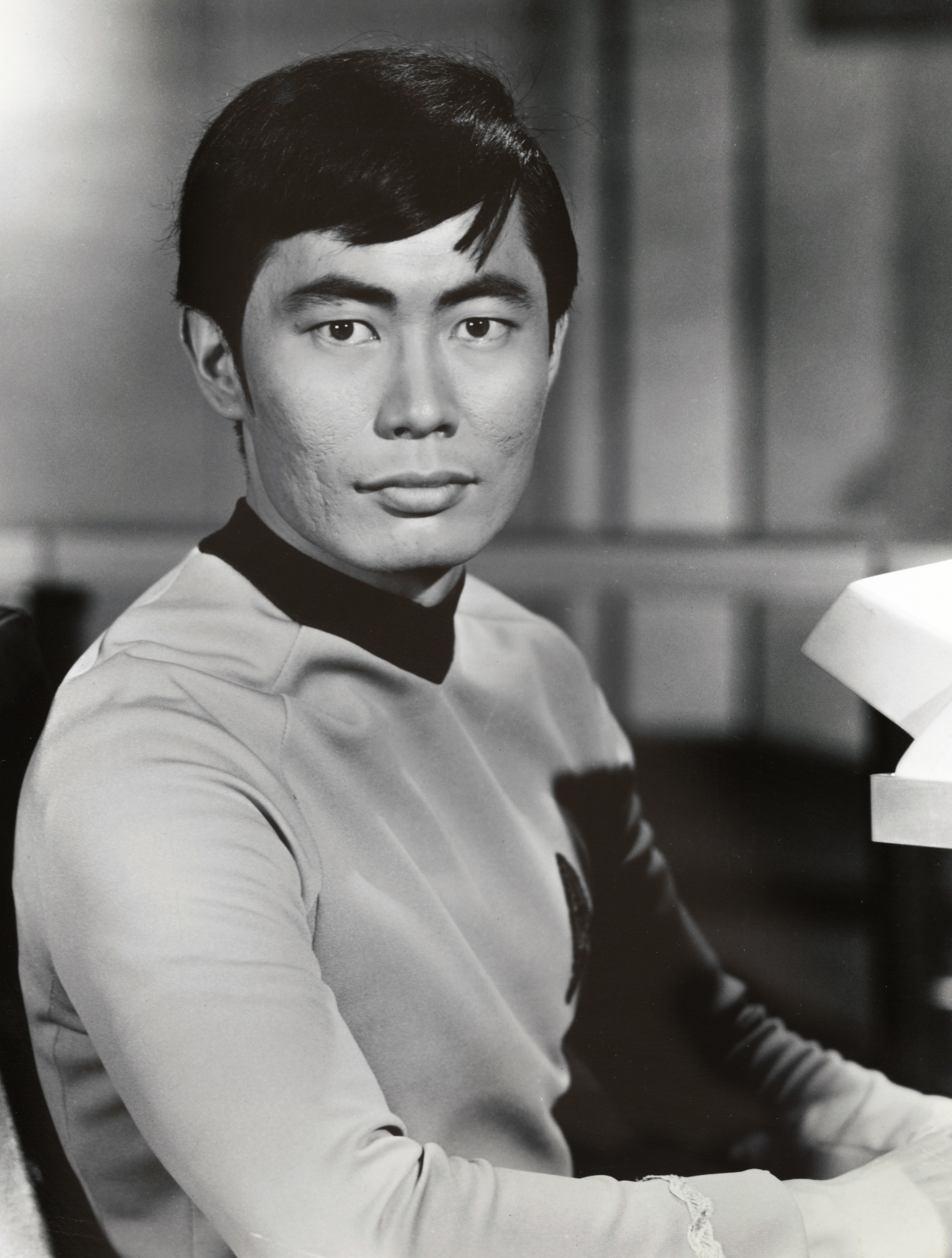
Takei as Lieutenant Hikaru Sulu

In 1965, producer Gene Roddenberry cast Takei as astrosciences physicist Hikaru Sulu in the second pilot for the original Star Trek television series. When the series was accepted by NBC, Takei continued in the role of Sulu, who was now the ship's helmsman.

It was intended that Sulu's role be expanded in the second season, but Takei's role in The Green Berets (1968) as Captain Nim, a South Vietnamese Army officer alongside John Wayne's character, took him away from Star Trek filming and he only appeared in half the episodes of that season. Walter Koenig as Pavel Chekov substituted for him in the other episodes. When Takei returned, the two men had to share a dressing room and a single episode script. Takei admitted in an interview that he initially felt threatened by Koenig's presence, but later grew to be friends with him as the image of the officers sharing the ship's helm panel side-by-side became iconic.

Takei has since appeared in numerous television and film productions, reprising his role as Sulu in Star Trek: The Animated Series from 1973 to 1974, and in the first six Star Trek films, the last of which promoted his character to captain of his own starship. Meanwhile, he became a regular on the science fiction convention circuit throughout the world. He has also acted and provided voice acting for several science fiction computer games, including Freelancer and numerous Star Trek games. In 1996, in honor of the 30th anniversary of Star Trek, he played Captain Sulu in an episode of Star Trek: Voyager.

Takei has spoken about personal difficulties with William Shatner. However, in an interview in the 2004 DVD set for the second season of Star Trek, Takei said of Shatner: "He's just a wonderful actor who created a singular character. No one could have done Kirk the way Bill did. His energy and his determination, that's Bill. And that's also Captain Kirk." He appeared alongside Shatner on the 2006 Comedy Central Roast of William Shatner in which the two mocked each other in good humor and embraced, Takei noting that he was "honored" to be there "despite our past tensions."

Takei is also one of six actors (the others being Jonathan Frakes, Kate Mulgrew, Michael Dorn, Avery Brooks, and Majel Barrett) to lend his voice to the 1997 video game Star Trek: Captain's Chair, reprising his role of Captain Hikaru Sulu when the player visits the bridge of the original Enterprise. In the summer of 2007, Takei played Sulu in the fan-made Internet based series Star Trek New Voyages: Phase II episode "World Enough and Time."

=== After Star Trek ===
In 1979, Takei co-wrote the science fiction novel Mirror Friend, Mirror Foe with Robert Asprin.

Takei's autobiography, To the Stars, was published in 1994. At one point, he had hoped to make a film or telefilm based on chapters dealing with the internment of Japanese Americans during World War II, of which he had personal experience.

In January 2007, Takei began appearing on Heroes, as Kaito Nakamura, a successful Japanese businessman and father to one of the main characters, time/space-travelling Hiro Nakamura, who also happens to be an obsessive fan of Star Trek. In the first episode in which Takei appears, "Distractions", the license plate of the limo he arrives in is NCC-1701, another reference to the Star Trek series. He appeared in all four seasons of the show.

Takei appeared on the first episode of Secret Talents of the Stars, singing country music, but was not selected to proceed to the next stage. However the point became moot as the series was abruptly cancelled after the opening episode.

In 2008, Takei appeared on the 8th season of the reality TV series I'm a Celebrity... Get Me Out of Here! on the British ITV television network. He lived in the Australian bush for 21 days and nights, doing tasks along with fellow campers to gain better meals and survive eviction from the show. His politeness and calmness made him popular with the other campers. Out of 12 participants the British public voted him into 3rd place behind 2nd placed Martina Navratilova and winner Joe Swash.

In 2009, Takei appeared in an episode of Star Wars: The Clone Wars as the Neimoidian general, Lok Durd, the first time a leading actor from Star Trek worked in a Star Wars production. In April that year, he voiced a fictitious version of himself in the NASA animated short "Robot Astronomy Talk Show: Gravity and the Great Attractor", part of the web-series IRrelevant Astronomy produced by NASA's Spitzer Space Telescope. Takei (and his husband Brad Altman) appeared in a documentary short titled George & Brad in Bed (2009) that profiled their relationship and was a guest on NPR's Wait Wait... Don't Tell Me!.

In 2010, Takei recorded a series of public service announcements for the Social Security Administration to help promote applying online for benefits.

In 2011, he appeared with husband Brad Altman in All Star Mr & Mrs, a show on ITV in Britain presented by Phillip Schofield and Fern Britton.

Takei was one of the celebrities in the 12th season of The Apprentice. He was fired in the third episode, which aired on March 4, 2012.

Takei was featured with Martin Sheen and Jamie Lee Curtis in a performance of Dustin Lance Black's play 8—a staged reenactment of the federal trial Perry v. Brown that overturned California's Proposition 8 ban on same-sex marriage—as William Tam. The production was held at the Wilshire Ebell Theatre and broadcast on YouTube to raise money for the American Foundation for Equal Rights.

In 2012, Takei starred in the musical Allegiance, which Takei described as his legacy project. The show is based on Takei's own experiences and research into the Japanese American internment of World War II and premiered at the Old Globe Theatre in Balboa Park in San Diego, California. Allegiance debuted on Broadway on November 8, 2015, to mixed reviews. The Guardian said it was "unexceptional though often affecting"; Deadline called it "a triumph of a rare sort, shedding light in a dark corner of our history with uncommon generosity of spirit." The New York Times praised the "well-intentioned and polished" play for tackling a difficult subject while trying at the same time to entertain its audience, but said Allegiance "struggles to balance both ambitions, and doesn't always find an equilibrium." The Associated Press said Allegiance tries to tackle internment camps, discrimination and war, "but does so unsuccessfully in a bombastic and generic Broadway musical." Variety wrote, "In their sincere efforts to 'humanize' their complex historical material, the creatives have oversimplified and reduced it to generic themes." The Hollywood Reporter said "the powerful sentiments involved are too often flattened by the pedestrian lyrics and unmemorable melodies of Jay Kuo's score." USA Today called Allegiance "as corny as Kansas in August and as obvious as Lady Gaga on a red carpet. But darned if it won't get a grip on your heartstrings."

In 2013, Takei was a guest judge in the TBS reality show King of the Nerds, in which he is one of three judges of the Cosplay Competition.

Beginning September 17, 2013, Takei hosted Takei's Take, a web series reviewing consumer technology in a manner for viewers over 50 years in age. The series is produced by AARP.

Takei made an appearance in issue no. 6 of Kevin Keller where the titular character cites Takei as one of his heroes. Upon reading about Kevin with his partner, Takei decides to travel to Riverdale and surprise Kevin. Takei also wrote the foreword for the second volume of the Kevin Keller comics.

Takei appeared in the viral video for Bonnie McKee's song "American Girl" lip syncing the lyrics to her song.

Starting in 2013, Takei became spokesperson for Rooms To Go, an American furniture retailer. He was seen in a series of television commercials where he used his famous "Oh Myyy!" tag line.

In January 2014, Jennifer Kroot's documentary film about Takei, To Be Takei, premiered at the Sundance Film Festival. He also participated in Do I Sound Gay?, a documentary film by David Thorpe about stereotypes of gay men's speech patterns.

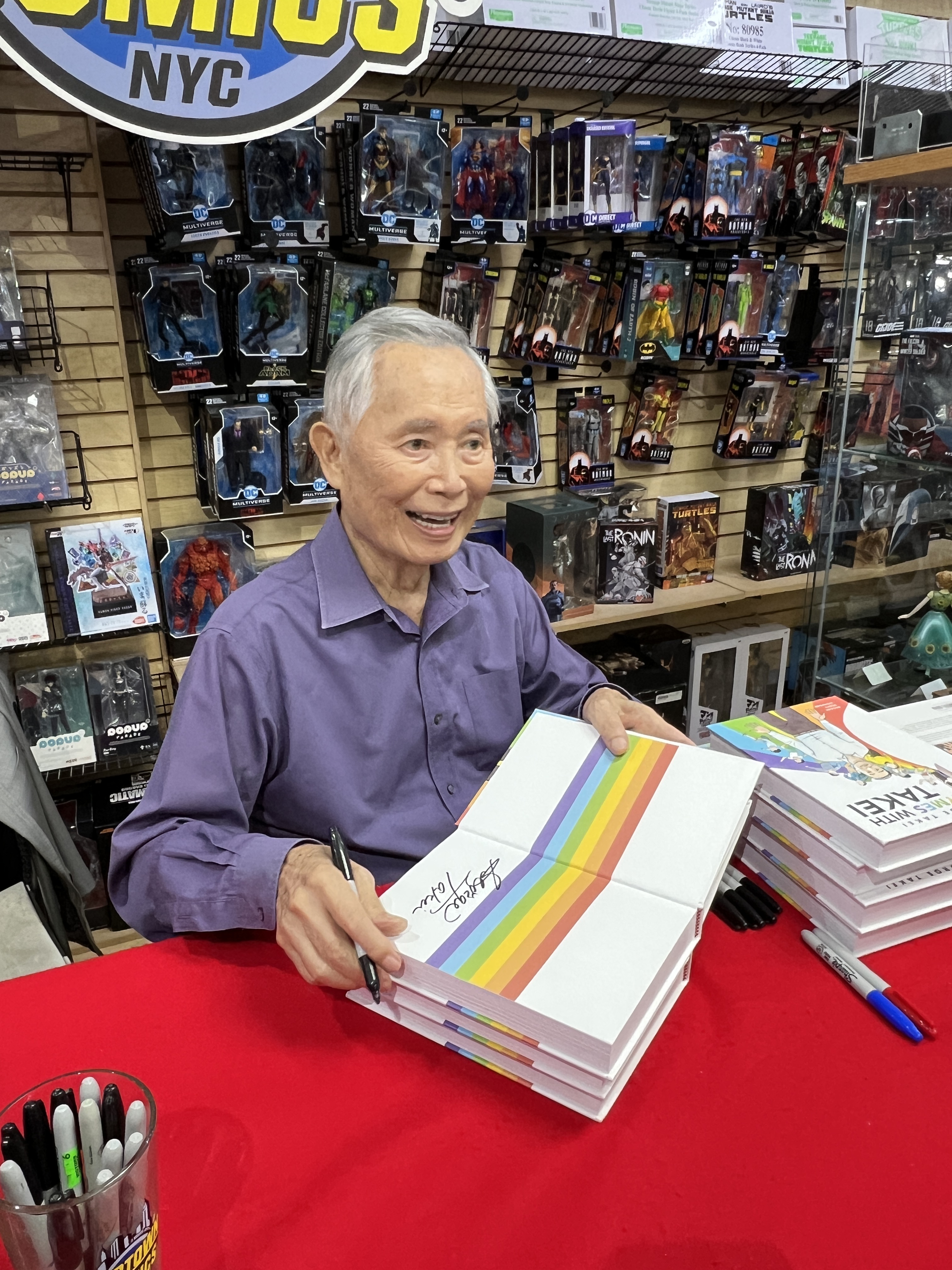
Takei at a June 2025 signing for his second graphic novel memoir, It Rhymes with Takei, in which he recounts his journey from a closeted actor to gay icon, at Midtown Comics in Manhattan

In 2015, he produced a YouTube mini-series It Takeis Two featuring himself and Altman, described as a "parody-scripted reality series" that also includes Internet culture. The series ran for nine episodes.

In early 2017, Takei was featured in television commercials promoting the restaurant Pizza Hut.

In February 2010, Takei and Altman became the second same-sex couple to appear on the British game show All Star Mr & Mrs, losing to rugby player Phil Vickery and his wife Kate.

On July 16, 2019, Top Shelf Productions released They Called Us Enemy, a 208-page graphic novel memoir that focused on his family's internment in a World War II concentration camp. It was co-written with Justin Eisinger and Steven Scott, and illustrated by Harmony Becker. The book received an American Book Award in 2020. He narrated the documentary Who's on Top? in 2020. In June 2021, dean of the United States Air Force Academy Brig. Gen. Linell Letendre announced that They Called Us Enemy, which details both Takei's struggle with internment and understanding of American democracy, would be part of the Academy's new reading initiative for cadets. On February 23, 2022, Takei was the NCLS Kickoff speaker at USAFA, elaborating on his book and how his past influences his future.

On April 16, 2024, Crown Publishing released Takei's children's book memoir titled My Lost Freedom: A Japanese American World War II Story, in which Takei recounts how his family was forced to leave Los Angeles after Japan's attack upon Pearl Harbor, and forced to live in a series of concentration camps. The book is illustrated by Michelle Lee, whose artwork was based not only the text provided by Takei via his memories, but also from the research she did at the Japanese American National Museum in Los Angeles, on whose board Takei served as a member, her meetings with the museum's education director, who gave her access to the museum's archives. The book was praised by Kirkus Reviews, which dalled Takei's story "an unflinchingly honest, child's-eye view of these events", which Kirkus noted, Takei deftly told for the sensiblities of its young audience, in which he "interweaves moments of levity and escape: movie nights," and in which, Kirkus wrote, "His parents’ courage shines through, too."

On June 10, 2025, Top Shelf released Takei's second graphic novel memoir, the 336-page It Rhymes with Takei, in which Takei again collaborated with Scott, Eisinger, and Becker to recount his personal journey from closeted actor to coming out on October 27, 2005 at age 68, after which he became an international gay icon.Kirkus Reviews called the book "a heartwarming journey that, yes, goes boldly where few men have gone before."

=== Facebook ===
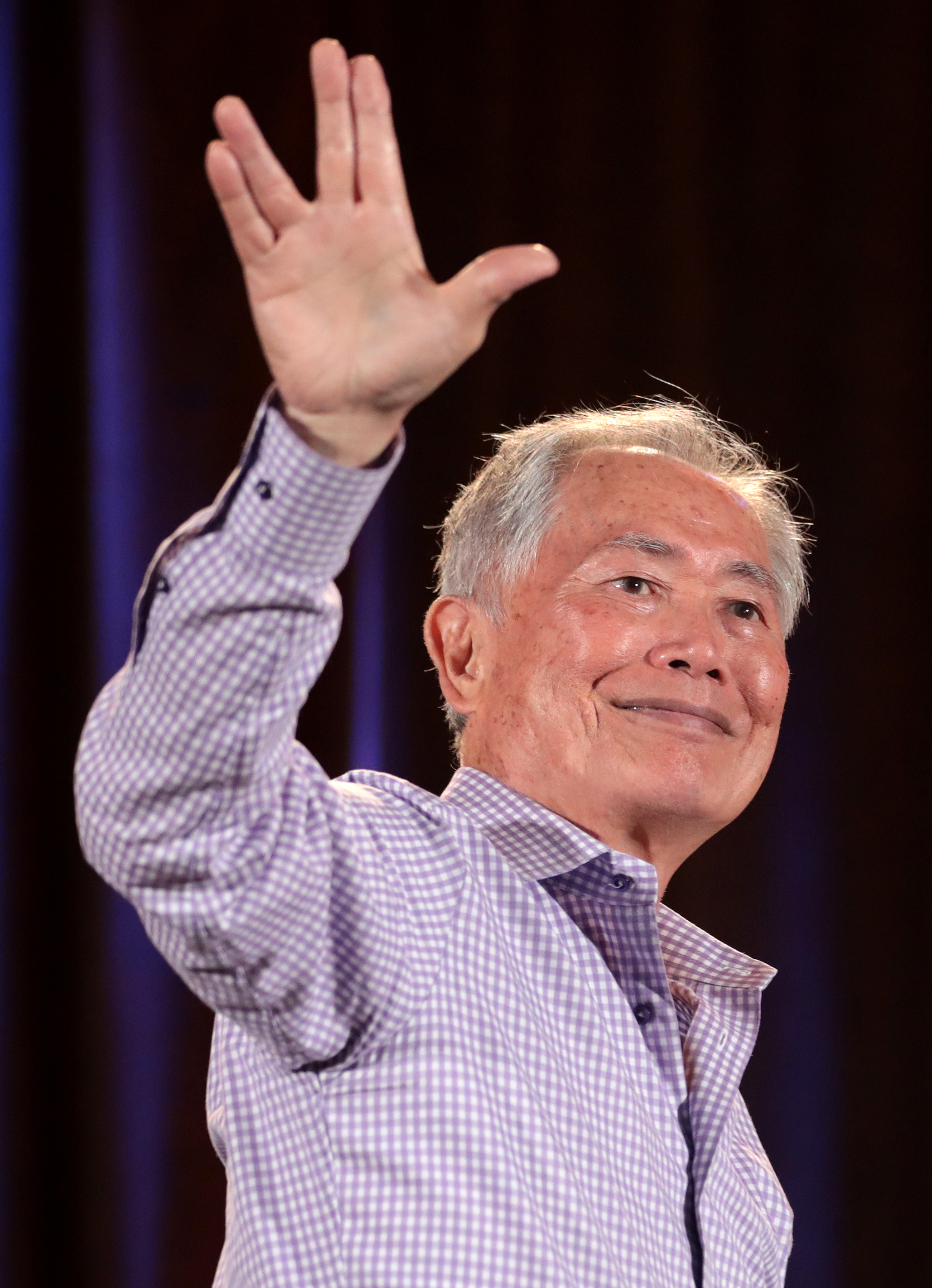
Takei at the 2019 Phoenix Comicon

Takei has garnered attention for his Facebook page, where he posts daily humorous pictures, many of which are related to science fiction, LGBT culture, and political satire. Takei's Facebook account has attracted over 9 million followers, some of whom are unfamiliar with Takei or Star Trek. He has been lauded as "the funniest guy on Facebook." In September 2013, Takei used his Facebook page to defend Nina Davuluri, who was targeted by a backlash of racist and xenophobic comments after being named Miss America 2014. He later appeared in a joint ABC interview with Davuluri, in which she revealed that she is a Trekkie. Takei told her, "In Star Trek we have this creed: 'Infinite diversity in infinite combinations'. That's what Starfleet was all about so you're a part of that." Davuluri ended the interview by stating, "I have to say 'Live Long and Prosper'" at which point Takei offered her the Vulcan salute, which she returned. However, Takei also attracted criticism from some people with disabilities in 2014 for his posting of a meme on Facebook and Twitter which shows a wheelchair-using woman standing up to reach something from the top shelf in a store and is captioned "there has been a miracle in the alcohol isle" [sic]. Disabled people responded that people need not be paralyzed to need wheelchairs; Takei then removed the post and apologized on Facebook for his comments.

== Legal issues ==
In November 2017, former actor and model Scott R. Brunton told The Hollywood Reporter that Takei drugged and groped him in Takei's condo in 1981, when Brunton was 23 years old. Takei denied the allegation, writing on Twitter: "I have wracked my brain to ask if I remember Mr. Brunton, and I cannot say I do. ... Non-consensual acts are so antithetical to my values and my practices, the very idea that someone would accuse me of this is quite personally painful." In response to the allegation, Mic, Slate, Refinery29, Upworthy, GOOD and Futurism announced they would be cutting ties with Takei.

On May 24, 2018, the New York Observer's Shane Snow reported that Brunton had "changed his story", describing his encounter with Takei as a "great party story" and confessing to "not remembering any touching" of his genitalia. Snow also consulted toxicologists, who suggested Brunton likely had postural hypotension rather than a drugged drink, and a former senior deputy district attorney, who contended "there's nothing to prosecute" if it was the case that Takei stopped physical contact with Brunton after being denied consent. That same month, Takei posted Snow's article on his social media platforms while publicly forgiving Brunton for his misdeeds, stating: "despite what he has put us through, I do not bear Mr. Brunton any ill will, and I wish him peace."

== Activism and advocacy ==
Takei was an alternate delegate from California to the 1972 Democratic National Convention. The following year he ran for a seat on the Los Angeles City Council, finishing second of five candidates in the special election and losing by 1,647 votes; the winner, David Cunningham Jr., received 42% of the votes cast and Takei received 33%. During the campaign, Takei's bid for the city council caused one local station to stop running the repeats of the original Star Trek series until after the election and KNBC-TV to substitute the premiere episode of the Star Trek animated series scheduled by the network with another in which his character did not appear, in attempts to avoid violating the FCC's equal-time rule. The other candidates in the race complained that Takei's distinctive and powerful voice alone, even without his image on television every week, created an unfair advantage.

Los Angeles mayor Tom Bradley later appointed Takei to the board of directors of the Southern California Rapid Transit District, making him part of the team that initiated and planned the Los Angeles subway system. Takei was called away from the set of Star Trek: The Motion Picture in 1978 to cast the tie-breaking vote for the creation of the Los Angeles subway system. He served on the board from 1973 to 1984.

In 1980, Takei began a campaign for California state assemblyman (District 46) from the greater Los Angeles area. However, he chose to withdraw after his opponent challenged the airing of episodes of Star Trek on local television under the Federal Communications Commission's Fairness Doctrine "equal time" regulations, saying also that "this is the wrong time to interrupt my career as an actor and author." He also appeared as a sadistic Japanese POW camp commander in the World War II film Return from the River Kwai (1989).

As of 2006, Takei serves as a spokesperson for the Human Rights Campaign "Coming Out Project." In 2006, he embarked on a nationwide "Equality Trek" speaking tour sharing his life as a gay Japanese American, his 18-year relationship with Altman, Frontrunners, and Star Trek, encouraging others to share their own personal stories. In the wake of the 2007 controversy over former NBA player Tim Hardaway, who had stated "I hate gay people", Takei recorded a mock public service announcement which began as a serious message of tolerance, then turned the tables on Hardaway by proclaiming that while he may hate gay people, gay people love him and other "sweaty basketball players", and promising Hardaway that "I will have sex with you." This was aired on Jimmy Kimmel Live! Takei also appeared on the Google float at San Francisco Pride 2007.

In November 2010, Takei released a PSA blasting Clint McCance, who was at the time the vice president of the school board for the Midland School District in southern Independence County, Arkansas. In the video, Takei repeatedly called McCance "a douchebag." Takei's video was made as a response to McCance making blatantly homophobic remarks, stating that he "enjoys the fact that [gay people] give each other AIDS and die." McCance went on to encourage gay people to commit suicide, and stated that he would disown his children if they were gay. McCance later resigned his seat on the Midland school board. Takei was praised for his response to McCance and garnered much media attention with the PSA.

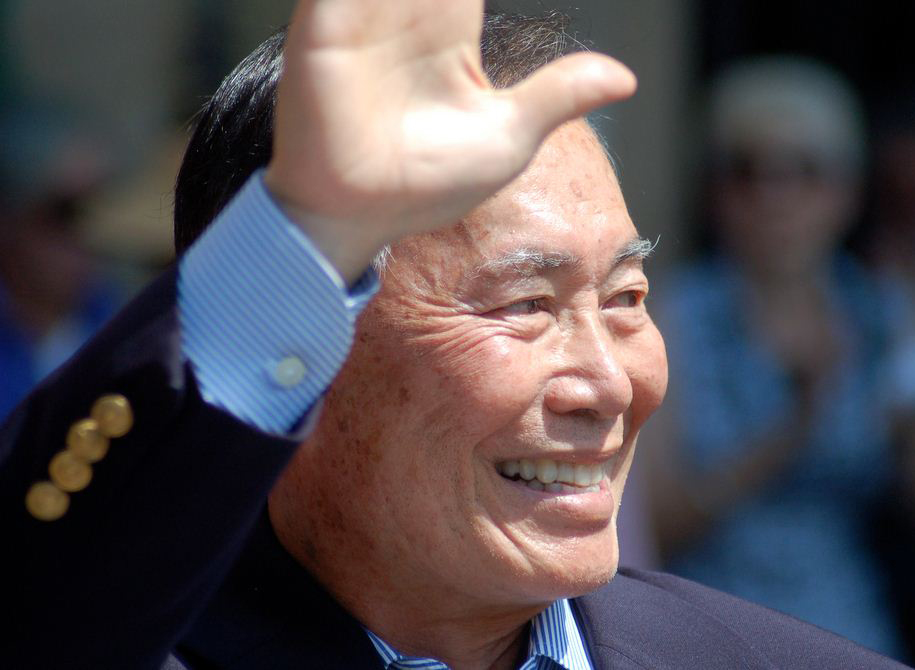
Takei in September 2012

In May 2011, in response to a Tennessee State Legislature bill that prohibited school teachers or students from using any language that alludes to the existence of homosexuality, Takei released another PSA in which he offered up his name, suggesting that people could just substitute that for 'gay'. For example, they could support Takei marriage or watch Takei pride parades; or even use slurs such as That's so Takei, or sing Don we now our Takei apparel during the holiday season.

Takei marked the 70th anniversary of the internment of Americans of Japanese descent, including himself as a child, by asking his readers to contact the US Congress to block S. 1253, the National Defense Authorization Act, that "would authorize a similar sweeping authority, granted to the President, to order the detention—without charge or trial—of any person even suspected of being associated with a 'terrorist organization'".

In 2014, Takei raised $100,000 for an adult Eagle Scout to start a web series, titled Camp Abercorn, documenting his experiences in the Boy Scouts of America after he was forced to leave, due to their anti-gay adult policy. Takei stated, "As a former Boy Scout myself, it pains me deeply that the BSA still boots out gay Scouts when they turn 18. This web series will help educate and inform, as well as entertain. That gets a big thumbs up from me. Let's make this happen."

In 2015, after the announcement of the U.S. Supreme Court same-sex marriage decision, Obergefell v. Hodges, Takei was critical of Clarence Thomas's dissent and called Thomas "a clown in blackface." After defending his comments for over a week, Takei apologized for his wording.

Takei was criticized for his response on Twitter to the shooting of Steve Scalise in June 2017. Calling Scalise "bigoted" and "homophobic", Takei criticized his previous opposition to same-sex marriage and commented that Crystal Griner, the officer who saved Scalise, was a lesbian. Takei's response was widely criticized, with Jake Tapper calling it "unfathomable."

On December 8, 2015, following Donald Trump's call to ban all Muslims from traveling to the United States, Takei appeared on MSNBC to denounce him: "It's ironic that he made that comment on December 7, Pearl Harbor Day – the very event that put us in those internment camps", Takei said. "[A congressional commission] found that it was three things that brought that about. One was racial hysteria, second was war hysteria and third was failure of political leadership. Donald Trump is the perfect example of that failure. ... What Donald Trump is talking about is something that's going to make his logo 'America disgraced again'." During the transition following Trump's election, Carl Higbie cited the internment of Japanese Americans as a historical precedent for a register of Muslims. Takei described Higbie's comments as "dangerous" and went on to say on The Last Word with Lawrence O'Donnell that "[r]egistration of any group of people, and certainly registration of Muslims, is a prelude to internment."

On March 31, 2017, Takei announced his intent to challenge Devin Nunes, Republican incumbent House representative for the 22nd District of California. A few hours later, he acknowledged that it had all been an April Fools' joke and instead announced his support for Jon Ossoff, who was running in Georgia's 6th congressional district special election, 2017. While Ossoff did not win the House seat, he did become Georgia's senator in 2021.

Takei formerly served as chair of the Council of Governors of East West Players, one of the pioneering Asian Pacific American theaters in the United States, until 2018. That same year, he played the parts of Sam Kimura and Ojii-San in East West Players' and the Japanese American Cultural & Community Center's joint production of Allegiance. Throughout the press tour of the production, he spoke openly about parallels he saw between the WWII-setting of the musical and the current political climate of the United States.

Takei and his husband Brad Altman own a New York City–based digital publication called Second Nexus, which publishes "news with commentary from a progressive perspective."

In the run-up to the 2024 United States presidential election, Takei came out strongly for Kamala Harris while criticizing Donald Trump. He wrote in an opinion piece in the Daily Beast that he viewed Trump as a creator of "cruel chaos" who must be prevented from taking office again. Takei also criticized Gaza war protesters for not backing Harris's presidential campaign, claiming that "I doubt they speak for most progressives."

On September 22, 2025, Takei was named the honorary chair of the 2025 edition of Banned Books Week. Takei mentioned his upbringing as having a "lack of access to books and media," and called on people to fight against censorship of books.

== Personal life ==
=== Relationships ===
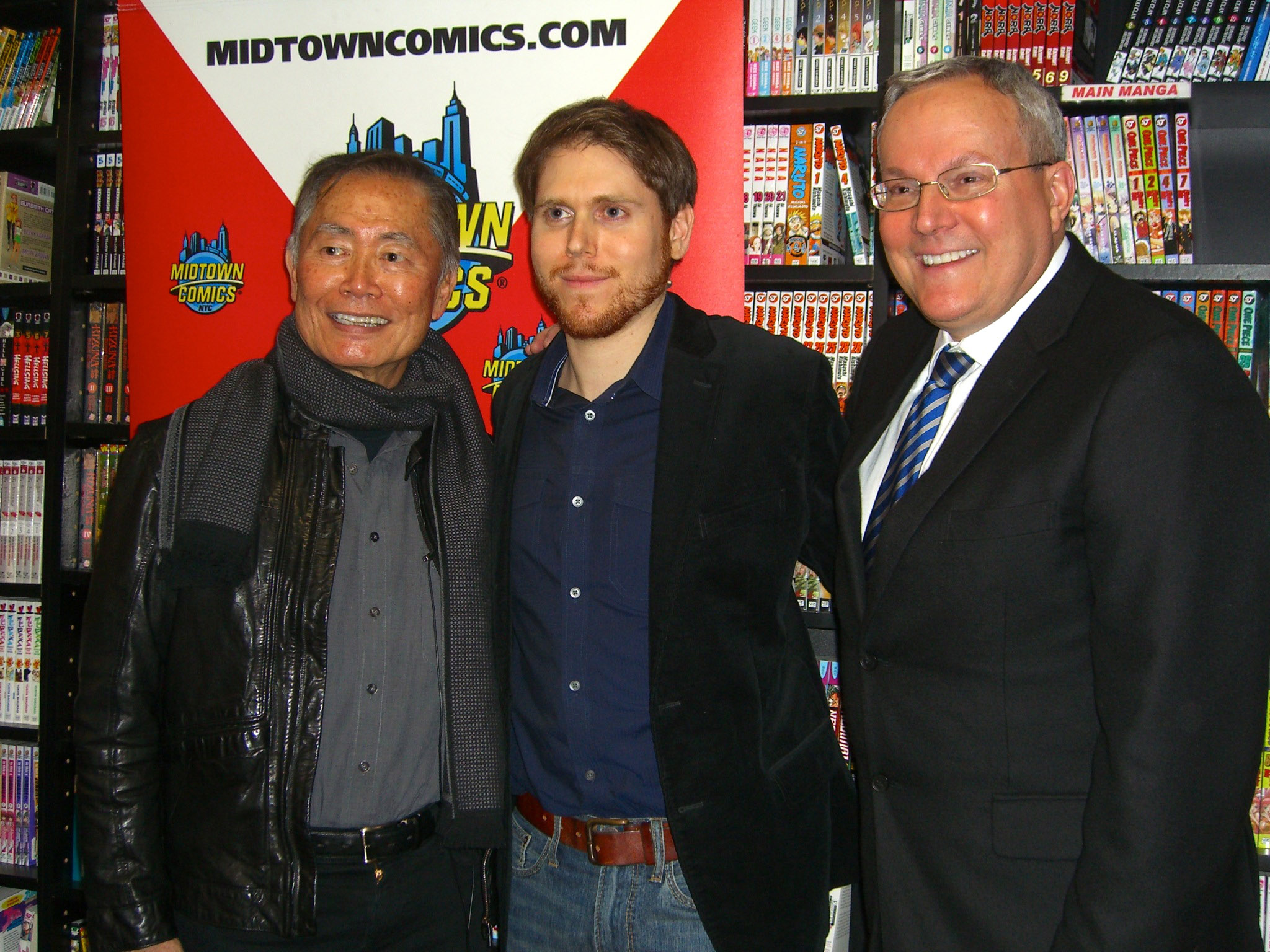
Left to right: Takei, They Called Us Enemy co-author Steven Scott, and Takei's husband Brad Altman at Midtown Comics in New York

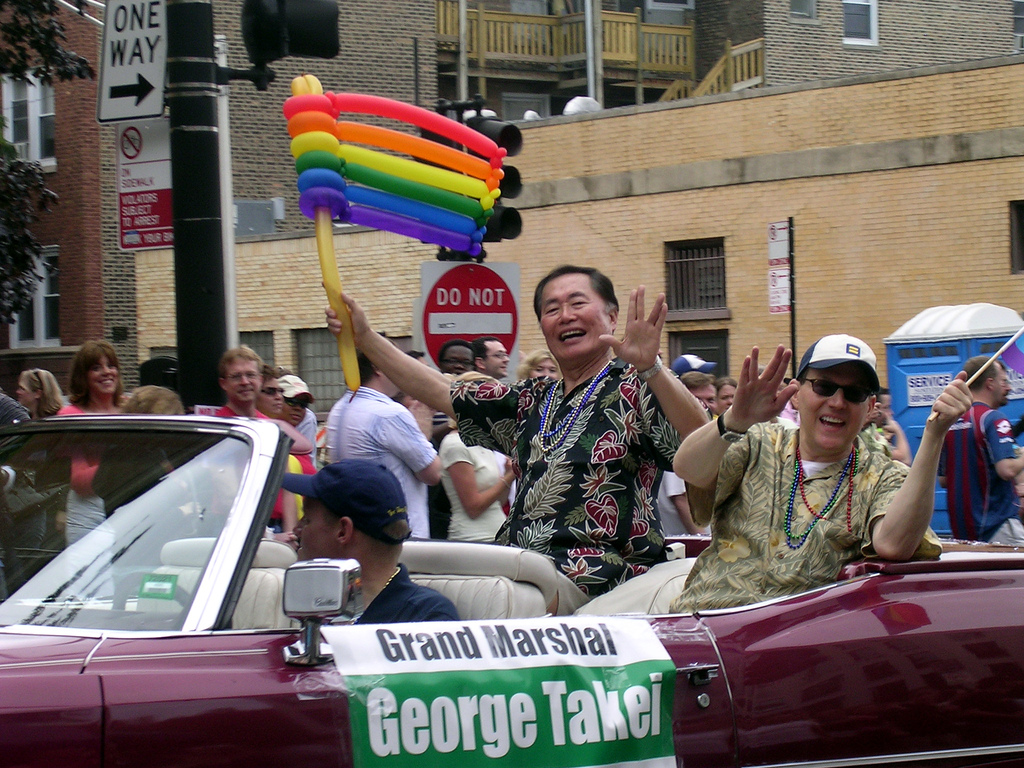
Takei at the Chicago Pride Parade in 2006

In October 2005, Takei revealed in an issue of Frontiers magazine that he is gay and had been in a committed relationship with his partner, Brad Altman, for 18 years; the move was prompted by then California governor Arnold Schwarzenegger's veto of same-sex marriage legislation. Takei said "It's not really coming out, which suggests opening a door and stepping through. It's more like a long, long walk through what began as a narrow corridor that starts to widen." Nevertheless, Takei's sexuality had been an open secret among Star Trek fans since the 1970s, and Takei did not conceal his active membership in LGBTQ organizations, including Frontrunners, where he developed public friendships with openly gay couples such as Kevin and Don Norte. In an on-air telephone interview with Howard Stern in December 2005, Takei explained, "[We (gay people)] are masculine, we are feminine, we are caring, we are abusive. We are just like straight people, in terms of our outward appearance and our behavior. The only difference is that we are oriented to people of our own gender." Takei also described Altman as "a saint" for helping to take care of Takei's terminally ill mother.

On May 16, 2008, Takei announced that he and Altman would be getting married. They were the first same-sex couple to apply for a marriage license in West Hollywood. On June 17, shortly after Takei and Altman obtained their marriage license, they spread the news by holding a press conference outside the West Hollywood city auditorium. They were married on September 14, 2008, at the Democracy Forum of the Japanese American National Museum in Los Angeles, of which Takei is one of the founders and serves as a member of its board of trustees. Walter Koenig was his best man, and Nichelle Nichols, eschewing the title "matron of honor", was "best woman." Reverend William Briones of the Nishi Hongwanji Buddhist Temple of Los Angeles presided.

Takei and Altman appeared in a celebrity edition of The Newlywed Game TV show, which the GSN cable network aired October 13, 2009. They were the first same-sex couple to be featured on the show. Takei and Altman won the game, winning $10,000 for their charity, the Japanese American National Museum.

=== Religious beliefs ===
Takei is a Buddhist. His father practiced Zen Buddhism and his mother practiced Shin Buddhism. He kept a small shrine when the family was incarcerated at an internment camp during World War II. After the war, Takei attended Sunday school at Senshin Buddhist Temple in Los Angeles, California. Takei and husband Brad Altman were married in 2008 at a Buddhist ritual performed by the Reverend William Briones.

== Awards and recognition ==
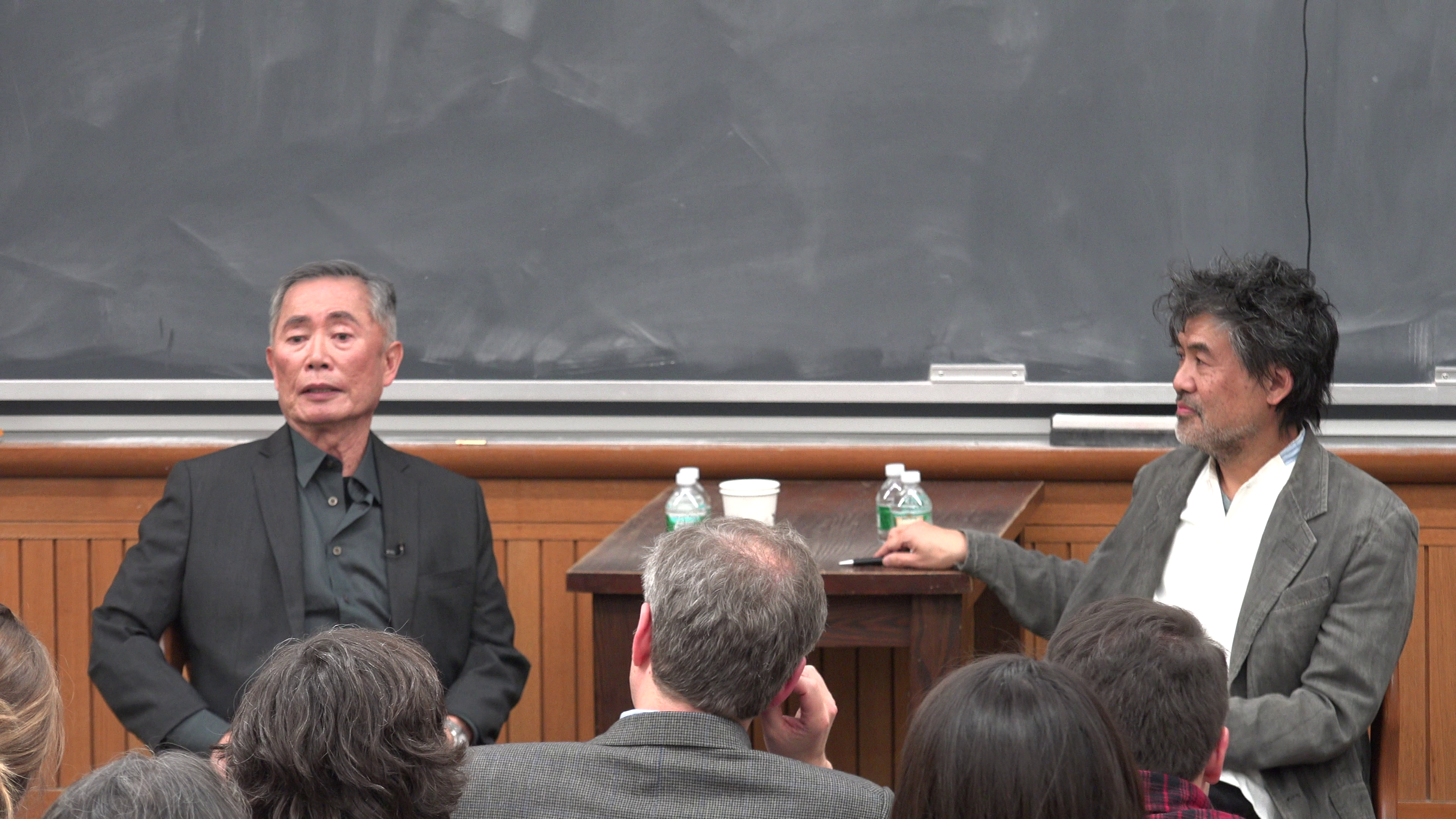
George Takei and David Henry Hwang discussing Allegiance at Columbia University in late 2015

In 1986, Takei was inducted into the Hollywood Walk of Fame with a star at 6681 Hollywood Boulevard for his work in television.

In 2004, the government of Japan conferred upon Takei the Order of the Rising Sun, Gold Rays with Rosette, which represents the fourth highest of six classes associated with the award. This decoration was presented in acknowledgment of his contributions to US–Japanese relations.

Asteroid 7307 Takei is named in his honor. Upon learning of the decision to name the asteroid after him, he said, "I am now a heavenly body. I found out about it yesterday. ... I was blown away. It came out of the clear, blue sky—just like an asteroid."

In November 2007, Takei was given a Lifetime Achievement Award by the San Diego Asian Film Festival.

In June 2012, the American Humanist Association gave Takei the LGBT Humanist Award.

In July 2013, the National Association of Asian American Professionals honored Takei with the NAAAP100 award for his contributions to the Asian community.

In May 2014, the Gay & Lesbian Alliance Against Defamation honored Takei with the GLAAD Vito Russo Award, which is presented to an openly LGBT media professional who has made a significant difference in promoting equality for the LGBT community.

In May 2015, the Japanese American National Museum honored Takei with its Distinguished Medal of Honor for Lifetime Achievement and Public Service at the Japanese American National Museum's 2015 Gala Dinner in Los Angeles.

On June 10, 2016, California State University, Los Angeles presented Takei with an honorary Doctorate of Humane Letters for his contributions. In 2019, he was awarded the Inkpot Award.

On April 1, 2020, it was announced that Takei would be the final torchbearer for the delayed 2021 Tokyo Summer Olympic Games. On April 2, he announced it was an April Fools' joke.

On September 28, 2022, Takei was awarded an honorary doctorate by the University of South Australia in recognition of his distinguished service to the community.

== Filmography ==
=== Film ===
Year	Film	Role	Format	Notes	Refs
1957	Rodan	Professor Kashiwagi (voiceovers only)	English voice only	U.S. version	
1958	Ice Palace	Wang			
1959	Battle of the Coral Sea	Japanese Radio Operator (uncredited)			
1959	Godzilla Raids Again	Commander of Landing Craft (voiceovers only)	English voice only	U.S. version	
1959	Never So Few	Soldier in hospital (uncredited)			
1960	Hell to Eternity	George			
1961	A Majority of One	Butler			
1963	PT-109	Helmsman aboard Japanese destroyer (uncredited)			
1965	Red Line 7000	Kato			
1966	Walk, Don't Run	Police Captain			
1968	The Green Berets	Captain Nghiem			
1970	Which Way to the Front?	Yamashita			
1971	Josie's Castle	Ken Tanaka			
1979	Star Trek: The Motion Picture	Lt. Commander Sulu			
1982	Star Trek II: The Wrath of Khan	Commander Sulu			
1984	Star Trek III: The Search for Spock	Commander Sulu			
1986	Star Trek IV: The Voyage Home	Commander Sulu			
1989	Star Trek V: The Final Frontier	Commander Sulu			
1989	Return from the River Kwai	Lieutenant Tanaka			
1990	Blood Oath/Prisoners of the Sun	Vice-Admiral Baron Takahashi			
1991	Star Trek VI: The Undiscovered Country	Captain Sulu			
1993	Live by the Fist	Uncle Coronado			
1993	Bruce Lee: The Curse of the Dragon	Self - Narrator (Voice)	Documentary		
1994	Oblivion	Doc Valentine			
1996	Oblivion 2: Backlash	Doc Valentine		Direct-to-video	
1998	Mulan	First Ancestor	Voice		
1998	Bug Buster	Dr. Hiro Fujimoto		Direct-to-video	
2004	Mulan II	First Ancestor	Voice		
2008	The Great Buck Howard	Himself			
2008	Ninja Cheerleaders	Ninja Sensei Hiroshi			
2008	Futurama: Bender's Game	Himself	Voice	Cameo	
2008	You Don't Mess with the Zohan	Himself		Cameo	
2009	Scooby-Doo! and the Samurai Sword	Old Man Samurai	Voice		
2011	Larry Crowne	Dr. Ed Matsutani			
2012	Strange Frame	Tamadamsa	Voice		
2012	Space Milkshake	Gary	Voice		
2013	Free Birds	S.T.E.V.E.	Voice		
2014	Eat With Me	Himself			
2014	To Be Takei	Himself			
2014	Axel: The Biggest Little Hero	Elder	Voice		
2015	Entourage	Himself		Cameo	
2015	The Gettysburg Address	Himself			
2016	Kubo and the Two Strings	Hosato	Voice		
2017	Yamasong: March of the Hollows	Elder Masook	Voice		
2022	Paws of Fury: The Legend of Hank	Ohga	Voice		

=== Television ===
Year	Show	Role	Notes
1959	The Californians	Lee Sing	Episode: "A Hundred Barrels" S2E27
1959	Perry Mason	Toma Sakai	Episode: "The Case of the Blushing Pearls" S3E4
1960	Assignment: Underwater	Kenji	Episode: "A Matter of Honor"
1960–1961	Hawaiian Eye	Hiroshi Kawagani	Episode: "Sword of the Samurai" S1E18
1960–1961	Hawaiian Eye	Yen Fu	Episode: "Jade Song" S2E5
1960–1961	Hawaiian Eye	Larry Chang	Episode: "The Manchu Formula" S2E34
1960–1961	Hawaiian Eye	Thomas Jefferson Chu	Episode: "Thomas Jefferson Chu" S3E5
1964	The Twilight Zone	Arthur Takamori	Episode: "The Encounter"
1964–1965	My Three Sons	Jimmy Soo	Episode: "My Fair Chinese Lady"
1964–1965	My Three Sons	Won Tsun	Episode: "The Hong Kong Story"
1964–1965	My Three Sons	Ham Radio Operator	Episode: "Lady in the Air"
1965	Voyage to the Bottom of the Sea	Major Lee Cheng	Episode: "The Silent Saboteurs"
1965	Death Valley Days	Wong Lee	Episode: "The Book"
1966	I Spy	Yuze	Episode: "The Barter"
1966–1969	Star Trek	Lt. Sulu	Main cast, 52 episodes
1966	Mission: Impossible	Roger Lee	Episode: "The Carriers"
1968	It Takes a Thief	Wo	Episode: "To Catch a Roaring Lion"
1969	The Courtship of Eddie's Father	Mr. Sato	Episode: "Gentleman Friend"
1970	Marcus Welby, M.D.	Fred	Episode: "To Get Through the Night"
1971	Ironside	Tsutomu Watari	Episode: "No Motive for Murder"
1973–1974	Star Trek: The Animated Series	Lt. Sulu	Voice, main role
1974	The Six Million Dollar Man	Chin Ling	Episode: "The Coward"
1975	Hawaii Five-0	Nathaniel Blake	Episode: "Death's Name Is Sam"
1976	Black Sheep Squadron	Maj. Kato	Episode: "Up for Grabs"
1978	Vega$	Dr. Takahama	Episode: "Ghost of the Ripper"
1985	General Hospital	Diem	recurring
1986	MacGyver	Dr. Shen Wei	Episode: "The Wish Child"
1986	The New Adventures of Jonny Quest	Chin	Episode: "Secret of the Clay Warriors"
1986	Blacke's Magic	Casey Watanabe	Episode 10: "A Friendly Game of Showdown"
1987	Miami Vice	Kenneth Togaru	Episode: "By Hooker by Crook"
1987	Murder She Wrote	Bert Tanaka	Episode: "The Bottom Line is Murder"
1991–2016	The Simpsons	Restaurant Owner, Akira, Waiter, Wink, Game Show Host, Himself	Voice, 5 episodes
1995	Kissinger and Nixon	Lê Đức Thọ	Television film
1995	Kung Fu: The Legend Continues	Colonel Ong	Episode: "The Return of Sing Ling"
1996	3rd Rock from the Sun	Himself	Episode: "Hotel Dick"
1996	Spider-Man: The Animated Series	Wong	Voice, episode: "Doctor Strange"
1996	Star Trek: Voyager	Capt. Sulu	Episode: "Flashback"
1996–1997	Space Cases	Warlord Shank	
1996–2004	Hey Arnold!	Kyo Heyerdahl	Voice, 2 episodes
1998	Hercules	Ptolemy	Voice, episode: "Hercules and the Falling Star"
1999	Batman Beyond	Mr. Fixx	Voice, episode: "Rebirth"
2002–2007	Kim Possible	Master Sensei	Voice, 3 episodes
2002	Samurai Jack	Warrior No. 4	Voice, episode: "Jack vs. Demongo, the Soul Collector"
2002–2026	Futurama	Himself	Voice, 5 episodes
2002	Jackie Chan Adventures	High Mystic	Voice, episode: "The Chosen One"
2004	Scrubs	Priest	Episode: "My Best Friend's Wedding"
2005	Avatar: The Last Airbender	Fire Nation Prison Warden	Voice, episode: "Imprisoned"
2006	Malcolm in the Middle	Himself	Episode: "Hal Grieves"
2006	Psych	Himself	Episode: "Shawn vs. the Red Phantom"
2006	Will & Grace	Himself	Episode: "Buy, Buy Baby"
2007	Cory in the House	Ronald	Episode: "Air Force One Too Many" (missing info)
2007	El Tigre: The Adventures of Manny Rivera	The Seventh Samurai	Voice, episode: "Rising Son"
2007–2010	Heroes	Kaito Nakamura	
2008	Star Wars: The Clone Wars	General Lok Durd	Voice, episode: "Defenders of Peace"
2008	I'm a Celebrity...Get Me Out of Here!	Himself/Contestant	Third place / 20 episodes
2008–2009	Chowder	Foie Gras	Voice, 2 episodes
2009	Transformers: Animated	Yoketron	Voice, episode: "Five Servos of Doom"
2009	Party Down	Himself	Episode: "Stennheiser-Pong Wedding Reception"
2009	The Super Hero Squad Show	Galactus	Voice, 3 episodes
2010	The Big Bang Theory	Himself	Episode: "The Hot Troll Deviation"
2010	The Suite Life on Deck	Rome Tipton	Episode: "Starship Tipton"
2010	Scooby-Doo! Mystery Incorporated	Mr. Wang, White Wizard	Voice, episode: "The Dragon's Secret"
2010	Community	Himself/narrator	Episode: "Epidemiology"
2010	True Justice	Tanaka	2 episodes
2011–2013	Supah Ninjas	Hologramps, Evil Grandpa	Main role
2011	Fish Hooks	Bird, Robot	Voice, 2 episodes
2011–2012	Pound Puppies	Mr. Julius	Voice, 2 episodes
2012, 2014	Archer	Mr. Moto	Voice, 2 episodes
2010–2012	Adventure Time	Ricardio the Heart Guy	Voice, 2 episodes
2012	Hawaii Five-0	Uncle Choi	Episode: "Kahu"
2012	The Celebrity Apprentice	Himself/Contestant	16th place 4 episodes
2012	Phineas and Ferb	Positive Reinforcement Machine	Voice, episode: "Perry the Actorpus"
2012–2013	Transformers: Prime	Alpha Trion	Voice, 2 episodes
2013	The New Normal	Sam	1 episode
2013–2014	The Neighbors	Supreme Commander/Father	Recurring role
2013	Ultimate Spider-Man	Elder Monk	Voice, episode: "Journey of the Iron Fist"
2013	Lost Girl	Snake Man / Amphisbaena	1 episode
2014	King of the Nerds	Himself	1 episode
2014	Real Husbands of Hollywood	Himself	Episode: "Don't Vote for Nick"
2014	Through the Keyhole	Himself	1 episode
2014	Kung Fu Panda: Legends of Awesomeness	Master Cheng	Voice, episode: "The Real Dragon Warrior"
2015	Penn Zero: Part-Time Hero	Sashi's Dad	Voice, 2 episodes
2015	Hot in Cleveland	Rev. Matsuda	Episode: "Duct Soup"
2015	Miles from Tomorrowland	Spectryx	Voice, episode: "Eye to Eye"
2015	BoJack Horseman	Audiobook Narrator	Voice, episode: "Brand New Couch"
2015–present	Robot Chicken	Various voices	2 episodes
2015	Regular Show	Daisuke	Voice, episode: "Just Friends"
2016, 2020	Bubble Guppies	Major Bummer, Master Rakunuki	Voice, episodes: "Space Guppies!" and "Ninja Season!"
2016	The 7D	Dr. Sweet Tooth	Voice, episode: "Smarty Tooth"
2016	Almost Royal	Himself	Episode: "Future"
2016–2019	Elena of Avalor	King Toshi	Voice, 2 episodes
2017	Fresh Off the Boat	Bernard	2 episodes
2019	The Terror	Yamato-san	Season 2
2019	Star Trek: Short Treks	Hikaru Sulu	Archive audio used in episode: "Ephraim and Dot"
2020	Love Monster	Elder Panda	
2020	Scooby-Doo and Guess Who?	Himself	Voice, episode: "Hollywood Knights!"
2020	The Twilight Zone	Kanamit No. 1	Episode: "You Might Also Like"
2020	Amphibia	Mr. Littlepot	Voice, episode: "The Shut-In!"
2021; 2025	Star Wars: Visions	Senshuu, Toad	Voice, 3 episodes; English dub
2021	Hit-Monkey	Shinji Yokohama	Voice, main role
2022	Jellystone!	So-So	Voice, episode: "Balloon Kids"
2022	He-Man and the Masters of the Universe	Mer-Man	Voice, 3 episodes
2022	Resident Alien	Grey Alien	Voice, 2 episodes
2022	Star Trek: Lower Decks	Hikaru Sulu	Voice, episode: "Crisis Point 2: Paradoxus"
2022	Call Me Kat	Himself	Episode: "Call Me Chrismukkah"
2023	Gremlins: Secrets of the Mogwai	Noggin	Voice, 5 episodes
2023	Blue Eye Samurai	Seki	Voice
2024	Avatar: The Last Airbender	Koh the Face Stealer	Voice, episode: "Spirited Away"

=== Video games ===
Year	Title	Role	Notes
1994	Star Trek: 25th Anniversary	Hikaru Sulu	CD-ROM version
1995	Star Trek: Judgment Rites	Hikaru Sulu	CD-ROM version
1997	Star Trek: Starfleet Academy	Hikaru Sulu	
1999	Star Trek: Starfleet Command	Hikaru Sulu	
2000	Star Trek: Starfleet Command II: Empires at War	Hikaru Sulu	
2003	Freelancer	Lord Hakera	
2004	Star Trek: Shattered Universe	Hikaru Sulu	
2007	Pain	Himself	
2008	Command & Conquer: Red Alert 3	Emperor Yoshiro	
2010	Marvel Super Hero Squad: The Infinity Gauntlet	Galactus	
2012	Skylanders: Giants	Arkeyan Conquertron	
2014	Family Guy: The Quest for Stuff	Himself	
2016	Teeny Titans	Mr. Chibi	
2017	Futurama: Worlds of Tomorrow	Himself	Playable character
2020	Yakuza: Like a Dragon	Masumi Arakawa	

=== Web series ===
Year	Title	Role	Notes
2007	Star Trek New Voyages: Phase II	Hikaru Sulu	
2023	Star Trek: Very Short Treks	Hikaru Sulu	Voice, episode: "Hologram All the Way Down"
2023	Blue Eye Samurai	Seki	Series regular

=== Commercials ===
Year	Title	Role	Notes
2011	Social Security advertisement	Himself	
2013	Rooms to Go	Spokesperson	
2017	Pizza Hut	Himself	

== Stage/theater ==
Year	Production	Role	Notes
1961	Fly Blackbird!	George	Inner City Cultural Center
1974	The Year of the Dragon	Fred Eng	Off-Broadway
1987	Aladdin	Genie	The Hexagon
1988	Undertow		Edinburgh Fringe Festival
1990	The Wash	Sadao Nakasato	Mark Taper Forum
2002	Pacific Overtures	Reciter	Loft Theatre
2005	Equus	Martin Dysart	East West Players
2009	Aladdin	Emperor of China	The Central Theatre, Chatham
2012	8	William Tam	Ebell of Los Angeles
2012–2015	Allegiance	Sam Kimura (present day) / "Ojii-San" (Grandpa) (1940s)	Old Globe Theatre and Broadway
2017	Pacific Overtures	Reciter	Signature Theatre Company
2018	Allegiance	Sam Kimura (present day) / "Ojii-San" (Grandpa) (1940s)	East West Players
2023	Allegiance	Sam Kimura (present day) / "Ojii-San" (Grandpa) (1940s)	Charing Cross Theatre

== Bibliography ==
- Takei, George; Asprin, Robert (1979). Mirror Friend, Mirror Foe. Chicago: Playboy Press. ISBN 0-87216-581-7.
- Takei, George (1994). To the Stars: The Autobiography of George Takei. New York: Pocket Books. ISBN 0-671-89008-5.
- Takei, George (2012). Oh Myyy! (There Goes the Internet). Oh Myyy! Limited Liability Company.
- Takei, George (2013). Lions and Tigers and Bears (The Internet Strikes Back) (Life, the Internet and Everything). Oh Myyy! Limited Liability Company.
- Takei, George; Eisinger, Justin; Scott, Steven; Becker, Harmony (2019). They Called Us Enemy. Marietta, Georgia: Top Shelf Productions. ISBN 9781603094504.
- Takei, George (2024). My Lost Freedom: A Japanese American World War II Story. Crown Books for Young Readers. ISBN 9780593566350.
- Takei, George; Scott, Steven; Eisinger, Justin; Becker, Harmony (2025). It Rhymes With Takei. Penguin Random House. ISBN 9781603095747.
