= Winternats =

American radio-controlled car race

Radio Operated Auto Racing
- Venue: Nuggets Ranch R/C Raceway
- Location: Arcadia, Florida, U.S.
- Corporate sponsor: Shepherd Racing
- First race: 1972
- Previous names: King Orange Winternationals

Circuit information
- Length: 0.120 mi (0.193 km)

The Winternats is a competitive on-road gas powered radio controlled car race attended by racers from around the world. It is currently held annually in Arcadia, Florida at Nugget's Ranch R/C Raceway, usually in the month of February. The Winternats is one of the oldest major R/C car racing events.

This event is sanctioned by the Radio Operated Auto Racing, or ROAR of North America and Canada. ROAR rules are followed. On-road gas (nitro) powered classes are 1/8 scale open, 1/8 scale masters and 1/10 scale sedan.

== History ==
=== The first Winternats ===
The first Winternats was held in Miami, Florida in 1972. It was organized and put on by the South Florida R/C Car Club. The club had a temporary track that was striped and sealed on the side of a Levitz Furniture store parking lot. Two of the local hobby shops supported the club. Crown Hobbies paid for the site insurance and Orange Blossom Hobbies furnished the trophies. A few of the members came up with the idea of putting on a "BIG" race. From that idea of a "BIG" race the club started a monthly newsletter that was mailed out nationally. The ‘local’ club became known on a National level. Not knowing when to have this "BIG" race or what to call it, somewhere the idea came up to have a Winternationals. The club decided to capitalize on the great weather and the Annual King Orange Jamboree, a long-standing Miami tradition at that time. The club checked with the King Orange Committee, they had no problems with the club using their name and the "BIG" race was on. January, 1972 the first Annual King Orange Winternationals was to be held in sunny South Florida! The club put this in their Newsletter with the entry applications, and entries poured in from all over the country. This was the "first" R/C Winternationals in the country. The first winner was John Thorpe of Pomona California, driving a belt driven car that he manufactured, called the Thorpe Car. Other attendees were Art Carbonell and the Campbells of Delta and Dick Dobson of Marker. The trophies were silver bowls filled with oranges.

=== Early years ===
The South Florida R/C Car Club in Miami held the first races from 1972 to 1975. At that time there were no nitro sedans, impacts, or 4WD pivot ball cars. It was all 2WD 1/8 scale pan cars (made by Delta, Associated, Marker Machine) powered by K&B or OPS .21 engines.

In 1976, the event was moved to the parking lot of a Howard Johnson's in Orlando, Florida. This coincided with the starting of the Florida On-Road Gas State Series. In the early 80s, the race took place at the first permanent track in Florida, located at the Orlando airport. Kim Davis was the race director.

The race really started to become well known around the world when top European drivers and IFMAR representatives began to attend.

=== Fort Myers ===
Bob Rule of Bolink asked Jim Rice, the President of the Fort Myers R/C Car Club, to take over running the race and the race was moved to Fort Myers. In 1988 and 1989 the event took place at a semi-permanent location at the Edison Mall in downtown Ft. Myers. From 1990 to 2022 the race was held at the Lee County Civic Center. The warm Florida weather during the middle of the winter helped to increase the popularity, since most nitro R/C racers couldn't race during the winter months. With drivers from around the world attending and manufacturers competing with their latest innovations, the race used the slogan 'Test Track to the World'

Arcadia

September 2022 Hurricane Ian made landfall on the southwest coast of the Florida Peninsula. Hurricane Ian made impact as a Category 4 storm with 150 mph sustained winds and an onslaught of rain and storm surges that became one of the most powerful and deadly hurricanes in Florida's history. The storm surge put 28" of flood waters inside the buildings that stored all of the Fort Myers R/C Club equipment. The high winds and water destroyed the drivers stand, the pit cover and tables. Jim Rice, the President of the Fort Myers R/C Club made the tough decision that there was no recovery from this damage, with the looming lease with the Lee Civic Center set to end at anytime. He decided to retire and pass the race event on to long time friend and fellow racer, Greg Esser at Nugget's Ranch RC Raceway in Arcadia, Florida. Nugget's Ranch Raceway was established in 2010. On February 9 -12, 2023 Nugget's Ranch RC Raceway held the 47th Annual Florida WinterNats to a sold out event. The Florida Winternats tradition continues.

=== Race name ===
The race was first called the ‘King Orange Winternationals’. In a few years, the race was promoted as the ‘Winter Nationals’. In the 1980s, the race was briefly known as ‘The Miller’ because of a sponsorship from the Miller Brewing Company. ROAR did not sanction the race in 1988 due to a disagreement over the naming of the race. Private insurance for the race was purchased by the Fort Myers R/C Car Club (FMRC) and a new name, the ‘Southern Gas Championship Race’ was used. Next year (1989) ROAR and FMRC came to an agreement on naming the race the ‘Winternats’. ROAR was again the insurer and sanctioning body. The race was promoted under both the Winternats and Southern Gas Championship Race names. Finally, in recent years the race is known simply as the WinterNats.

== Track features at The FORT - Fort Myers, Florida. ==
Track dimensions	150 feet × 90 feet
Driving line	635 feet
Surface	Asphalt
Timing system	AMBrc
Scoring program	LiveTime

== Practice ==
Practice days are on Monday through Wednesday from 8:00 AM till 5:00 PM. In the middle of the day, practice sessions are sorted into 1/8 and sedan classes. No fuel bottles or refueling is allowed inside the fenced-in track area to allow all drivers the chance to get practice. Severe penalties from the officials for breaking this rule include reprimands, loss of fuel bottle or being sent home.

== Qualifying ==
Takes place from Thursday through Friday. Qualifiers are four minutes long using the IFMAR start with up to ten drivers racing on their own clock. A maximum of five qualifiers are run over a two-day period. Practice is allowed in the mornings from 8:00 AM till 9:00 AM and in the evenings from the end of qualifying till 5:00 PM. Drivers are required to turn marshal after their qualifier or they will be docked one lap from their best qualifier.

== Mains ==
The mains are run over a two-day period. The lower mains are run on Saturday. The upper mains are run on Sunday. Mains are run from the lowest to the highest (A-main). The winner and runner-up of all mains below the A-main, are allowed the option to bump-up to the next main. Trophies are awarded to all A-main participants and the top three places in all mains. Bump-up drivers give up their trophy for the chance to race in the next main.

== Winners ==
=== 1/8 scale 4wd ===
Year	Date	Driver	Chassis	Top Qualifier
2026	Feb. 2-8	(France) (United States) Joachim Bruneau	Capricorn	(Finland) Teemu Leino
2025	Feb. 3-9	(Italy) Andrea Catanzani	Serpent	(Italy) Andrea Catanzani
2024	Feb. 5-11	(Netherlands) Jilles Groskamp	Infinity	(Netherlands) Jilles Groskamp
2023	Feb. 6-12	(United States) Eric Dennett	Capricorn	(United States) Diego Morganti
2022	Feb. 17-20	(United States) Paolo Morganti	Capricorn C804	(United States) Paolo Morganti
2021	Feb. 16-20	(United States) Paolo Morganti	Capricorn	(United States) Paolo Morganti
2020	Feb. 19-23	(United States) Eduardo Cabal	Serpent	(United States) Ralph Burch Jr.
2019	Feb. 14-17	(United States) DJ Apolaro	Capricorn	(United States) Paolo Morganti
2018	Feb. 14-17	(United States) Ralph Burch Jr.	Serpent 988	(United States) Ralph Burch Jr.
2017	Feb. 15-18	(United States) Roniel Regalado	Capricorn C803	(United States) DJ Apolaro
2016	Feb. 9-13	(United States) Paolo Morganti	Serpent 977	(United States) DJ Apolaro
2015	Mar. 17-21	(United States) Ralp Burch Jr.	XRAY RX8	(United States) Paolo Morganti
2014	Feb. 11-15	(Italy) Dario Balestri	Capricorn	(United States) Mike Swauger
2013	Feb. 12-16	(United States) Paolo Morganti	Serpent	(United States) Mike Swauger
2012	Feb. 14-18	(United States) Ralp Burch Jr.	XRAY RX8	(United States) Ralph Burch Jr.
2011	Feb. 1-6	(United States) Mike Swauger	XRAY RX8	(United States) Mike Swauger
2010	Feb. 7-13	(United States) Mike Swauger	Mugen MRX-4X	(United States) Mike Swauger
2009	Feb. 8-14	(United States) Paolo Morganti	Serpent 966	(United States) Mike Swauger
2008	Feb. 11-16	(United States) Mike Swauger	Mugen MRX-4X	(United States) Mike Swauger
2007	Feb 11-17	(United States) Chris Tosolini	Kyosho Evolva	(United States) Josh Cyrul
2006	Feb. 12-18	(United States) Mike Swauger	Mugen MRX-4R	(United States) Mike Swauger
2005	Feb. 6-12	(United States) Mike Swauger	Mugen MRX-4	(United States) Mike Swauger
2004	Feb. 8-14	(United States) Mike Swauger	Mugen MRX-3	(United States) Ralph Burch Jr.
2003	Feb. 9-15	(Germany) Michael Salven	Serpent	(Germany) Michael Salven
2002	Feb. 11-16	(Japan) Kenji Osaka	Mugen	(Japan) Kenji Osaka
2001	Feb. 12-17	(Germany) Michael Salven	Serpent	(United States) Ralph Burch Jr.
2000	Mar. 13-18	(United States) Ralph Burch Jr.	Serpent	(United States) Ralph Burch Jr.
1999	Feb 22-27	(Germany) Michael Salven	Serpent	(Germany) Michael Salven
1998	Feb 8-14	(Germany) Michael Salven	Serpent	(Germany) Michael Salven
1997	Feb	(United States) Chris Tosolini	BMT	
1996	Feb			
1995	Feb	(United States) Ralph Burch Jr.	BMT	
1994	Feb	(Germany) Michael Salven	Serpent Excel	(Germany) Michael Salven
1993	Feb			
1992	Feb	(United States) Ralph Burch Jr.	Picco	
1991	Feb	(Germany) Michael Salven	Serpent	
1990	Feb			
1989	Feb			
1988	Feb			
1987	Feb			
1986	Feb	(United States) Ralph Burch Jr.	Associated	
1985	Feb	(United States) Art Carbonell	Delta	
1984	Feb	(United States) Richard Lee	Associated	
1983	Feb	(United States) Ralph Burch Jr.	Associated	
1982	Feb	(United States) Ralph Burch Jr.	Associated	
1981	Feb			
1980	Feb			
1979	Feb	(United States) Rick Davis	Delta	
1978	Feb	(United States) Art Carbonell	Delta	
1977	Feb	(United States) Art Carbonell	Delta	
1976	Feb	(United States)		

=== 1/10 Scale Sedan ===
Year	Driver	Chassis	Top Qualifier
2026	(United States) DJ Apolaro	Infinity	(United States) Michael Palazzola
2025	(United States) Michael Palazzola	Mugen	(United States) Michael Palazzola
2024	(United States) Jose Almonte	Serpent	(United States) Bryce Butterfield
2023	(United States) Bryce Butterfield	Serpent	(United States) Bryce Butterfield
2022	(United States) Chris Lefebvre	X Ray	(United States) Chris Lefebvre
2021	(United States) DJ Apolaro	Infinity	(United States) DJ Apolaro
2020	(United States) Jeremiah Ward	Serpent 750	(United States) Ralph Burch Jr.
2019	(United States) DJ Apolaro	Capricorn	(United States) DJ Apolaro
2018	(Germany) Dominic Greiner	Serpent	(Germany) Dominic Greiner
2017	(United States) DJ Apolaro	Capricorn	(United States) DJ Apolaro
2016	(United States) Paolo Morganti	Serpent 747	(United States) Paolo Morganti
2015	(United States) Paolo Morganti	Serpent 747	(United States) DJ Apolaro
2014	(United States) DJ Apolaro	Capricorn	(United States) DJ Apolaro
2013	(United States) DJ Apolaro	Capricorn	(United States) Ralph Burch Jr.
2012	(United States) Paul Lemieux	XRAY NT1	(United States) Ralph Burch Jr.
2011	(United States) Ralph Burch Jr.	XRAY NT1	(United States) Ralph Burch Jr.
2010	(United States) Chris Tosolini	Serpent 720	(United States) Chris Tosolini
2009	(United States) DJ Apolaro	Serpent 720	(United States) Paulo Morganti
2008	(United States) Ralph Burch Jr.	Xray NT1	(United States) Paulo Morganti
2007	(United States) Paulo Morganti	Serpent 720	(United States) Paulo Morganti
2006	(Venezuela) Paulo Morganti	Serpent 710	(Venezuela) Paulo Morganti
2005	(United States) Scotty Gray	Serpent	(Germany) Michael Salven
2004	(United States) Mike Swauger	Mugen MTX	(Germany) Michael Salven
2003	(United States) Barry Baker	Associated	(Japan) Kenji Osaka

=== 1/8 Scale Masters ===
Year	Driver	Chassis	Top Qualifier
2026	(Netherlands) Arie Manten	Infinity	(Belgium) John Leaners
2025	(United States) George Martinez	Capricorn	(United States) Brad Toffelmire
2024	(United States) Billy Bowerman	Mugen	(United States) George Martinez
2023	(United States) Sal Difazio	Capricorn	(United States) Sal Difazio
2022	(United States) Peter Breton	Shepherd Velox	(United States) Peter Breton
2021	(United States) Peter Breton	Shepherd Velox	(United States) George Martinez
2020	(United States) Peter Breton	Shepherd Velox	(United States) Joaquin Desoto
2019	(United States) George Martinez	Capricorn	(United States) George Martinez
2018	(United States) Don Jones	Mugen	(United States) Chuck Moon
2017	(United States) Skip Starkey	Xray Rx8	(United States) Joaquin Desoto
2016	(United States) Joaquin Desoto	Serpent Viper 977	(United States) Joaquin Desoto
2015	(United States) Joaquin Desoto	Serpent Viper 977	(United States) Joaquin Desoto
2014	(United States) Skip Starkey	Xray Rx8	(United States) Joaquin Desoto
2013	(United States) Chuck Moon	XRAY RX8	(United States)
2012	(United States) Joaquin Desoto	XRAY RX8	(United States) Joaquin Desoto
2011	(United States) Skip Starkey	Mugen MRX-4X	(United States) Skip Starkey
2010	(United States) Randy Colvin	Mugen MRX-4X	(United States) Joaquin Desoto
2009	(United States) Maxy Velazco	Serpent 966	(United States) Maxy Velazco
2008	(United States) Jim Sowa	Mugen MRX-4X	(United States) Eli Ezrow
2007	(United States) Jim Sowa	Mugen MRX-4R	(United States) Don Jones
2006	(United States) Lucas Garneau	Mugen MRX-4	(United States) Don Jones

=== 1/8 Scale GT ===
Year	Driver	Chassis	Top Qualifier
2026	(Puerto Rico) Jose Almonte	Serpent	(Puerto Rico) Carlie Lopez
2025	(Italy) Andrea Catanzani	Serpent	(Italy) Andrea Catanzani
2024	(United States) Paolo Morganti	Igt8	(United States) Paolo Morganti
2023	(Puerto Rico) Jose Almonte	Serpent	(Puerto Rico) Carlie Lopez
2022	(United States) Hector Montaner	Sworkz	(United States) Diego Morganti
2021	(United States) Paolo Morganti	IGT8 2021	(United States) Paolo Morganti
2020	(United States) Martin Johnson	Serpent Cobra GT	(United States) Dave Larry
2019	(United States) Rino Lino	IGT8	(United States) Rino Lino
2018	(United States) Rino Lino	IGT8	(United States) Rino Lino
2017	(United States) Joaquin Desoto	Serpent Cobra GT	(United States) Paolo Morganti
2016	(United States) Joaquin Desoto	Serpent 811	(United States) Rino Lino
2015	(United States) Rino Lino	IGT8	(United States) Joaquin Desoto
2014	(United States) Bart Collins	Serpent	(United States) Joaquin Desoto

=== 1/8 Scale GT Electric ===
Year	Driver	Chassis	Top Qualifier
2026	(Puerto Rico) Carlie Lopez	Raptor	(United States) Will Carrera
2025	(Italy) Franco Desidario	X Ray	(Italy) Franco Desidario
2024	(United States) Avery Pierce	Igt8	(United States) Avery Pierce
2023	(Puerto Rico) Jose Almonte	Serpent	(Puerto Rico) Jose Almonte
2022	(United States) Dave Larry	X Ray	(United States) Dave Larry
2021	(Italy) Franco Desidario	Sworkz	(United States) PJ Dietz

=== 1/10 Scale 4wd ===
Year	Driver	Chassis	Top Qualifier
2006	(United States) David Larry	Mugen MTX-4	(United States) Mark Unger
2005	(United States) Mark Unger	Serpent 835	(United States) Jim Rice
2004	(United States) Vince Tate	Mugen Avance	(United States) Juan Prohias
2003	(United States) Juan Prohias	Serpent 835	(United States) Don Jones
2002	(United States) Ralph Burch Jr.	Serpent Impact M2	(United States) Ralph Burch Jr.
2001	(United States) Ralph Burch Jr.	Serpent Impact M2	(United States) Ralph Burch Jr.
2000	(United States) Robbie Malphurs	Serpent Impact 2	(United States) Fred Bowen-Smith

=== 1/10 scale 2wd ===
Year	Driver	Chassis	Top Qualifier
2002	(United States) Marty Barnes	Serpent Impact M2	(United States) Danny Horta
2001	(United States) Frank Calandra	Serpent Impact M2	(United States) Frank Calandra
2000	(United States) Ralph Burch Jr.	Serpent Impact 2	(United States) Ralph Burch Jr.
1999	(United States) Josh Cyrul	Serpent Impact 2	(United States) Josh Cyrul
1998	(United States) Josh Cyrul	Serpent Impact 2	(United States) Josh Cyrul
1994	(United States) Art Carbonell	Serpent Impact	(Germany) Michael Salven
1993	(United States) John Adams	Serpent Impact	

=== 1/8 scale 2wd ===
Year	Driver	Chassis	Top Qualifier
1999	(United States) Ted Hammer	Delta	(United States) Ted Hammer
1998	(United States) Ted Hammer	Delta	(United States) Ted Hammer
