= Herbert Nicholson =

Advocate for interned Japanese Americans (1892–1983)

Herbert Victor Nicholson (1892–1983) was an advocate for Japanese Americans who were interned by the US government during the Second World War. They knew him as "Friend Herbert".

Born in Rochester, New York, Nicholson was raised as a Quaker, and from 1915 he worked as a Quaker missionary in Japan, where he met his wife, another missionary, and learned to speak Japanese. After 25 years there, they moved to California in 1940, where he preached in a Methodist church.

Following the Japanese attack on Pearl Harbor in December 1941, thousands of Japanese people – most of whom were American citizens – were arrested and held in ten detention camps on the orders of President Franklin Roosevelt, starting in February 1942. Their property was confiscated, except what they could carry in a suitcase, and their bank accounts were frozen. Nicholson worked on their behalf as an interpreter, stored their goods in his church (which he converted into a warehouse for this purpose), helped them pack, and provided them with food and assistance.

Later, Nicholson drove to the detention camps to provide further support to the inmates. He delivered belongings, pets, gifts, and hymn books. He advocated for the inmates' release, meeting officials with the War Department and organising a public letter-writing campaign; 150,000 letters were sent to the US government. In 1945, when inmates were released, he helped them move back to California and find jobs. After the war, he called for reparations to be paid to the former inmates (legislation to do this was passed in 1988, five years after his death).

Nicholson and his wife returned to Japan in 1950, and moved back to the United States in 1961. He wrote an autobiography in 1972, Treasures in Earthen Vessels, which was later published in Japanese. He died in 1983.

He appears in George Takei's 2019 autobiographical graphic novel, They Called Us Enemy.

== Sources ==
- Densho Encyclopedia
- tunacanyon.org
