= Seaman's Furniture =

American furniture store

- Type: Private
- Industry: Furnishings
- Founded: 1933; 93 years ago
- Defunct: 2005; 21 years ago
- Fate: Liquidation; sold to Levitz
- Headquarters: Brooklyn, New York, United States
- Products: Home Furniture

Seaman's Furniture was an American chain of furniture stores based in Woodbury, New York. The chain was known for its slogan, "See Seaman's First".

== History ==
Julius Seaman opened his first store in 1933 in Brooklyn, New York. His enterprise gradually increased to an annual $150,000 in sales and allowed him to send his two sons to the Wharton School of the University of Pennsylvania. "His big[gest] goal in life was that his boys would follow him and build up his business," Morton Seaman told Forbes. Julius Seaman died at the age of 48 of a heart attack. He left Morton, the elder son and college graduate, to help his mother save for the business, while Carl, still in school, worked at weekends and during vacations.

In 1955, they spent $1,000 on the store's first ad. It was a full-page spread in a local paper. When sales tripled, the same week the ad was published, Morton decided to open a second store to reduce the cost of advertisement per unit. By 1971 there were seven Seaman stores.

In 1988, Seaman's Furniture was taken over in a buyout by Kohlberg Kravis Roberts & Co. Jeffrey Seaman, son of Morton Seaman, was 28 at the time, but he shouldered a large portion of the buying duties for the company. He and his father developed an overseas program during Seaman's restructuring phase.

On February 8, 1990, Seaman's Furniture announced that Morton and Jeffrey Seaman would leave the company; it was later succeeded by Matthew D. Serra, former president and chief executive of G. Fox.

In 2005, after being in business for more than 70 years, Seaman's merged with Levitz.

== In popular culture ==
Seaman's Furniture is mentioned in a song by hip hop group A Tribe Called Quest. In the song "Electric Relaxation" on their third album, "Midnight Marauders," Phife Dawg utters the ribald lyric: "Let me hit it from the back, girl/I won't catch a hernia/Bust off on your couch/Now you got Seaman's furniture."

== See also ==
- Levitz Furniture
- Rooms To Go
