= They Called Us Enemy =

2019 graphic novel by George Takei

- First edition cover
- Author: George Takei, Justin Eisinger, and Steven Scott
- Illustrator: Harmony Becker
- Language: English
- Subject: Internment of Japanese Americans during World War II
- Genre: Memoir, Graphic novel
- Publisher: Top Shelf Productions
- Publication date: July 16, 2019
- ISBN: 9781603094504

They Called Us Enemy is a 2019 graphic novel written by George Takei, Justin Eisinger, and Steven Scott, and illustrated by Harmony Becker. It is about Takei's experiences during the internment of Japanese Americans in World War II. It was published by Top Shelf Productions.

Takei's childhood comprises the bulk of the work, which alternates between the humor found in the minutiae of daily life and the moments of sadness evoked by the severity of the characters' lives in an internment camp. Throughout the book, "Takei describe[s] how these early experiences in the camps shaped his subsequent coming of age both in the theater and in politics."

A Spanish-language translation of the book was released in June 2020, as well as an expanded edition in July 2020 including bonus material. The book was rereleased as a vertical scrolling webcomic on Webtoon in 2025.

A sequel from the same team, entitled It Rhymes With Takei, was published in June 2025 and focuses on Takei's gay identity, his life in the closet, and his decision to come out at the age of 68 to build public support for same-sex marriage in the United States.

== Creation and conception ==
The book's writing began in early 2017, and the writing process concluded in the beginning of 2018. In the latter year, the producers of the comic hired the artist.

The writers used Allegiance and To The Stars as inspiration. The research process involved books, documents, film, and photographic works. Clip Studio Paint was used to create the artwork, and the work intended to have inspiration from American artwork and Japanese artwork.

== Reception ==
They Called Us Enemy is a New York Times bestselling book.

The book was generally well received by critics, including starred reviews from Booklist, Kirkus Reviews, and Publishers Weekly.

Kirkus Reviews stated that the work is "A powerful reminder of a history" and that the images "effectively convey the intense emotions and the stark living conditions." Booklist's Sarah Hunter also discussed the images, stating, "Becker's spare, fine-lined, manga-inspired artwork focuses intently on faces and body language, keeping the story centered in the realm of the personal." Hunter concluded by writing, "This approachable, well-wrought graphic memoir is important reading, particularly in today's political climate."

Publishers Weekly wrote, "Giving a personal view into difficult history, Takei's work is a testament to hope and tenacity in the face of adversity."

Writing for The New York Times, Ed Park praised the "pure" "power of the story" and how the artwork is "clear, empathic." However, according to Park, the shifting to the past and the present day occurs too often, and due to so many people collaborating on the work at the same time, "There are some glitches."

Michael Cavna of the Washington Post argued that the book strongly echoed civil rights activist John Lewis' autobiographical graphic novel trilogy March, which told the story of Lewis' work in the civil rights movement, and that Top Shelf, which published both books, appeared to be positioning Takei's memoir to be a similar hit, inasmuch as like March, it was written to be accessible to older grade-schoolers, and was marketed via appearances by Takei at fan conventions.

Kirkus Reviews named They Called Us Enemy one of the best books of the year. The book also "claimed the top spot on PW's annual Graphic Novel Critic's Poll," an annual review "compiled by asking participating critics to list up to 10 trade book releases they consider the best graphic novel and comics works of the year."

In 2022, the Comic Book Legal Defense Fund and PEN America identified They Called Us Enemy as one of the most-banned graphic novels in public schools, citing bans in numerous local school districts.

Awards for They Called Us Enemy
Year	Award	Result	Ref.
2019	Cybils Award for Young Adult Graphic Novel	Finalist	
2019	Goodreads Choice Award for Graphic Novels & Comics	Nominee	
2019	Outstanding Books for the College Bound: History and Cultures	Selection	
2019	VLA Graphic Novel Diversity Award for Youth	Winner	
2020	ALSC Notable Children's Books	Selection	
2020	American Book Award	Winner	
2020	Asian/Pacific American Award for Literature for Young Adult Literature	Winner	
2020	Booklist Editors' Choice: Adult Books for Young Adults	Selection	
2020	Great Graphic Novels for Teens	Top 10	
2020	Eisner Award for Best Reality-Based Work	Winner	
2021	Quick Picks for Reluctant Young Adult Readers	Selection	
2022	Rebecca Caudill Young Readers' Book Award	Nominee	

== See also ==
- Herbert Nicholson, a character in the graphic novel
