= Harmony Becker =

American cartoonist and illustrator

Harmony Becker is an American graphic novelist and illustrator, known for illustrating George Takei's memoirs They Called Us Enemy and It Rhymes with Takei, as well as for writing and illustrating the graphic novel Himawari House.

== Biography ==
Harmony Becker was born in Cincinnati, Ohio. Her mother is Japanese, and she describes growing up in a multicultural household.

After high school, Becker spent time volunteering and studying Korean in Washington, D.C., and South Korea. She briefly attended art school in Columbus, Ohio, before dropping out and instead pursuing comics while working as a waitress. Her first professional comics job was illustrating George Takei's 2019 graphic memoir They Called Us Enemy, which shares Takei's experiences of internment as a Japanese American during World War II. They Called Us Enemy won an Asian/Pacific American Award for Literature, a Silver Reuben Award, an American Book Award, and an Eisner Award, among other honors.

In 2021, Becker published her first solo graphic novel, Himawari House, which deals with a Japanese American girl reconnecting with her heritage at a shared house in Japan. It was based on her webcomic Himawari Share on the Tapas webtoon site. The following year, Himawari House won the Kirkus Prize for Young Readers' Literature.

In 2025, she worked with Takei again to illustrate his second graphic memoir, It Rhymes with Takei, which shares his life story and his process of coming out. It Rhymes with Takei won the 2026 Eisner Award for Best Graphic Memoir.

She has also created the webcomics Love Potion and Anemone & Catharus.

Becker cites Studio Ghibli as her greatest creative influence. She is currently based in Mexico City.
