= Himawari House =

2021 graphic novel by Harmony Becker

- Author: Harmony Becker
- Illustrator: Harmony Becker
- Language: English
- Genre: Graphic novel
- Publisher: First Second Books
- Publication date: November 9, 2021
- Publication place: United States
- Pages: 384
- Awards: Kirkus Prize
- ISBN: 978-1-250-23556-5

Himawari House is the debut graphic novel written and illustrated by artist Harmony Becker. It tells the story of a group of teenage exchange students who are spending a gap year in Japan. Himawari House focuses on Nao, the daughter of a Japanese immigrant, who goes there to learn more about its culture and language. Published on November 9, 2021, by First Second Books, it was the recipient of a Kirkus Prize in the "Young Readers' Literature" category, receiving praise for its art and creative use of speech balloons, which was used to represent the language barriers between characters.

== Reception ==
Himawari House received starred reviews from several outlets, including Publishers Weekly, Kirkus Reviews, School Library Journal and The Horn Book. Becker's usage of altered speech balloons to show the characters' difficulty in understanding each other sometimes was specially praised by reviewers. Jennifer M. Brabander, who reviewed for The Horn Book, called this use of the balloons "smart," and concluded her review by noting how Himawari House "explores, among other topics, how language can either separate or bring people together." Emilia Packard, for the School Library Journal, said the novel would be great for "teens interested in language and cultural exploration."

Publishers Weekly commented on the various references to Asian culture in the book, such as "nods to food, Asian pop culture, the konbini franchise Lawson," and how these enriched the narrative. They also praised Becker's art, saying "[t]hose unfamiliar will appreciate the fluid, expressive cast, [..] and the intricately sketched scenery." Kirkus Reviews was also very positive on the art present throughout the book. They noted how both the main and side characters are "well developed, with complex, heartstring-tugging backstories," and concluded by saying "this work exemplifies what the graphic novel format can achieve."

In 2022, Himawari House was the recipient of a Kirkus Prize in the "Young Readers' Literature" category, with the judges calling it a "remarkable mastery of graphic novel conventions and its perceptive exploration of emotionally resonant, evergreen themes relating to family, friendship, and identity."
