= Lee County Civic Center =

Multi purpose arena in Florida, USA

- Interactive map of Lee County Civic Center
- Location: 11831 Bayshore Road; Fort Myers, FL 33917
- Coordinates: 26.7231°N 81.7643°W
- Surface: Field Turf

Construction
- Opened: 1978

Tenants
- Winternats (1990–present); Fort Myers Tarpons (NIFL) (2007); Florida Stingrays (AIFA) (2008)

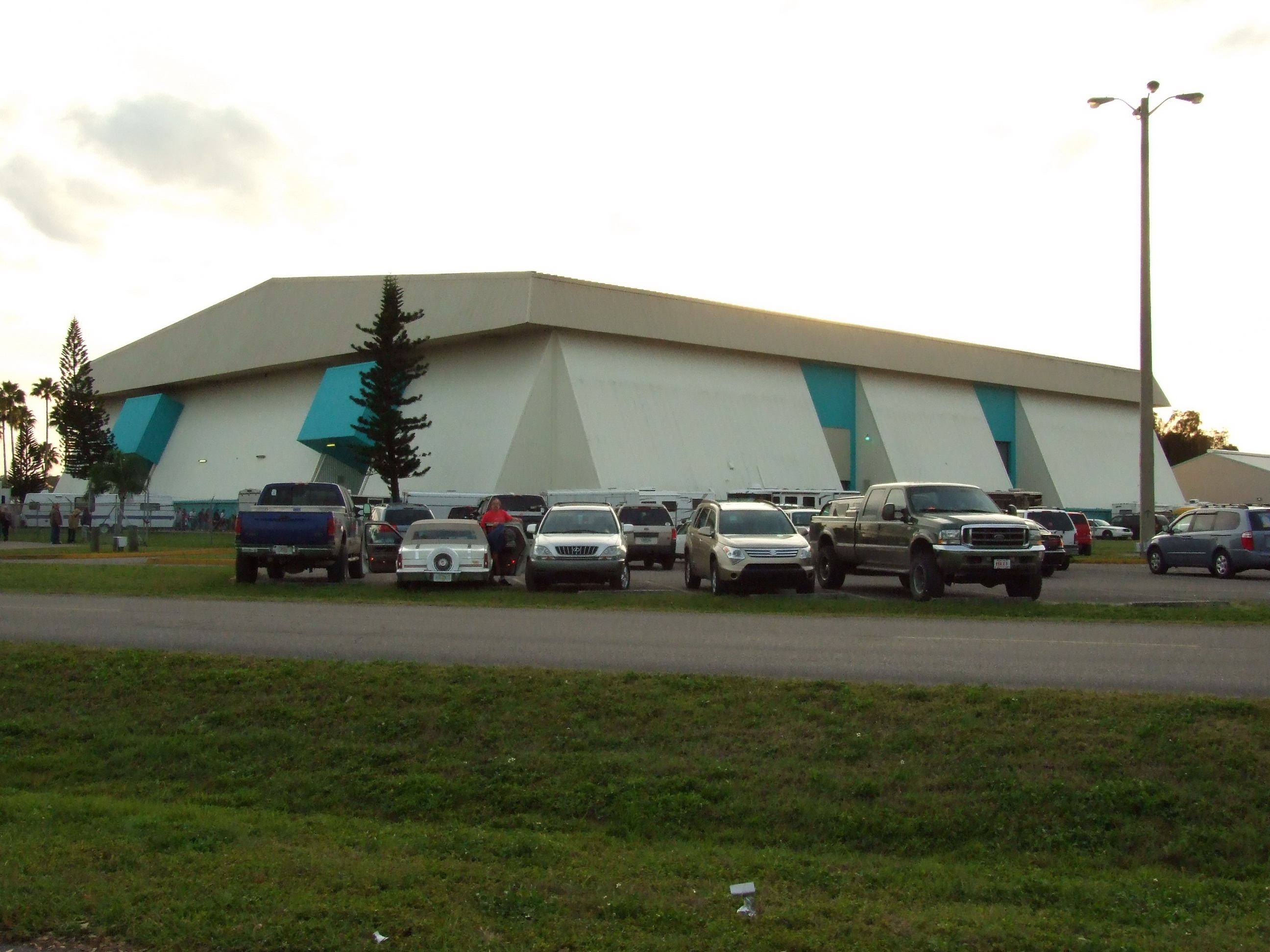
Lee Civic Center

The Lee County Civic Center is a 7,800-seat multi-purpose arena in North Fort Myers, Florida, US. It opened in 1978.

It hosts local sporting events and concerts.

It has been the home of the Winternats since 1990, one of the oldest major Radio Controlled Car racing events in the world.

On November 15, 2008, WWE Raw superstar John Cena made a rare appearance/autograph signing and he scouted Florida Championship Wrestling talent.
