= Levitz Furniture =

American retailer

- Type: Private
- Industry: Furnishings
- Founded: 1910; 116 years ago in Lebanon, Pennsylvania
- Founder: Richard Levitz
- Defunct: 2008; 18 years ago
- Fate: Liquidation
- Headquarters: Boca Raton, Florida
- Number of locations: 80 (2007)
- Products: Home Furniture
- Website: Official website (Archived on the Wayback Machine (from February 23, 2005)

Levitz Furniture was a nationwide chain of American furniture stores that helped create the "furniture warehouse" genre of retail furniture sales. It was in business for nearly 100 years before liquidating in bankruptcy in early 2008.

== History ==
=== Growth ===
The company was founded in Lebanon, Pennsylvania, in 1910 by Richard Levitz.

In the 1960s, Levitz, expanded by Richard's sons Leon and Ralph, successfully pioneered the sales of moderately priced brand-name furniture from a warehouse-style store. It suffered in the 1990s as consumers began to prefer showroom sales that featured spaces arranged to look like actual rooms in houses. The chain continued to expand in 2005, when they acquired Seaman's Furniture and Huffman Koos stores after bankruptcy.

=== Marketing ===
The store is known for that slogan and jingle "You'll love it at Levitz" as well as the Spanish-language version with the same slogan and jingle: "Le encantará Levitz."

=== Bankruptcy and liquidation ===
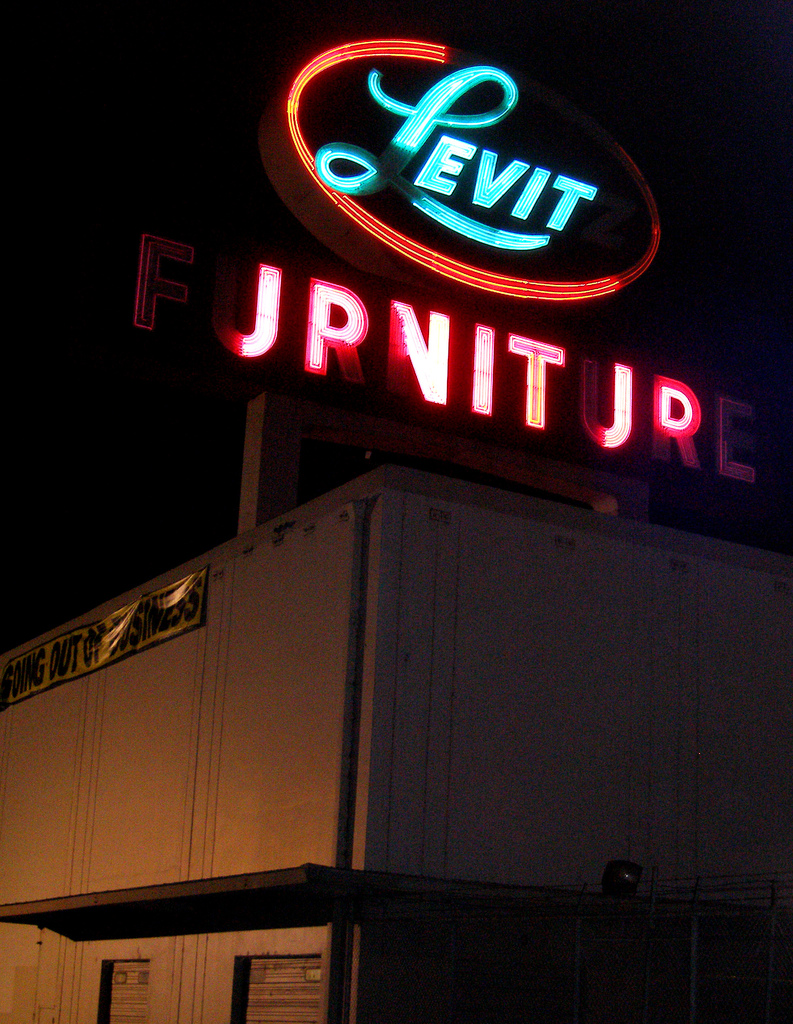
Levitz Furniture store during liquidation sale, December 2007.

Levitz was accused of having been poorly run for more than a decade starting in the 1990s. It declared Chapter 11 bankruptcy twice during the period, in 1997 and again in 2005, both times emerging after a corporate restructuring and the participation of new outside backers.

On December 21, 1998, Levitz announced it would close 27 stores and lay off 25% of its workforce. The company downsized its warehouse system from 65 to 17 sites.

The furniture market underwent a prolonged nationwide downturn after 2000 and 2001, and was hurt again in late 2007 by the 2007 subprime mortgage financial crisis. Levitz filed for bankruptcy the final time in October 2007. As of that time, it was operating nearly 80 stores, mostly in the Northeastern United States and on the West Coast, under the corporation PLVTZ LLC. In October 2008, Levitz Furniture, with bankruptcy court approval, converted its Chapter 11 case to Chapter 7, and started liquidation sales.

The company was sold in bankruptcy to a group of bidders, led by Hilco Merchant Resources, that acted to rapidly liquidate its inventory and close all remaining stores.

Private investment company Oak Point Partners acquired the remnant assets, consisting of any known and unknown assets that weren't previously administered, from the PLVTZ, Inc. a.k.a. Levitz Furniture Bankruptcy Estate on March 19, 2013.

== See also ==
- The Room Store
- Breuners Home Furnishings
