= Linell Letendre =

United States Air Force general

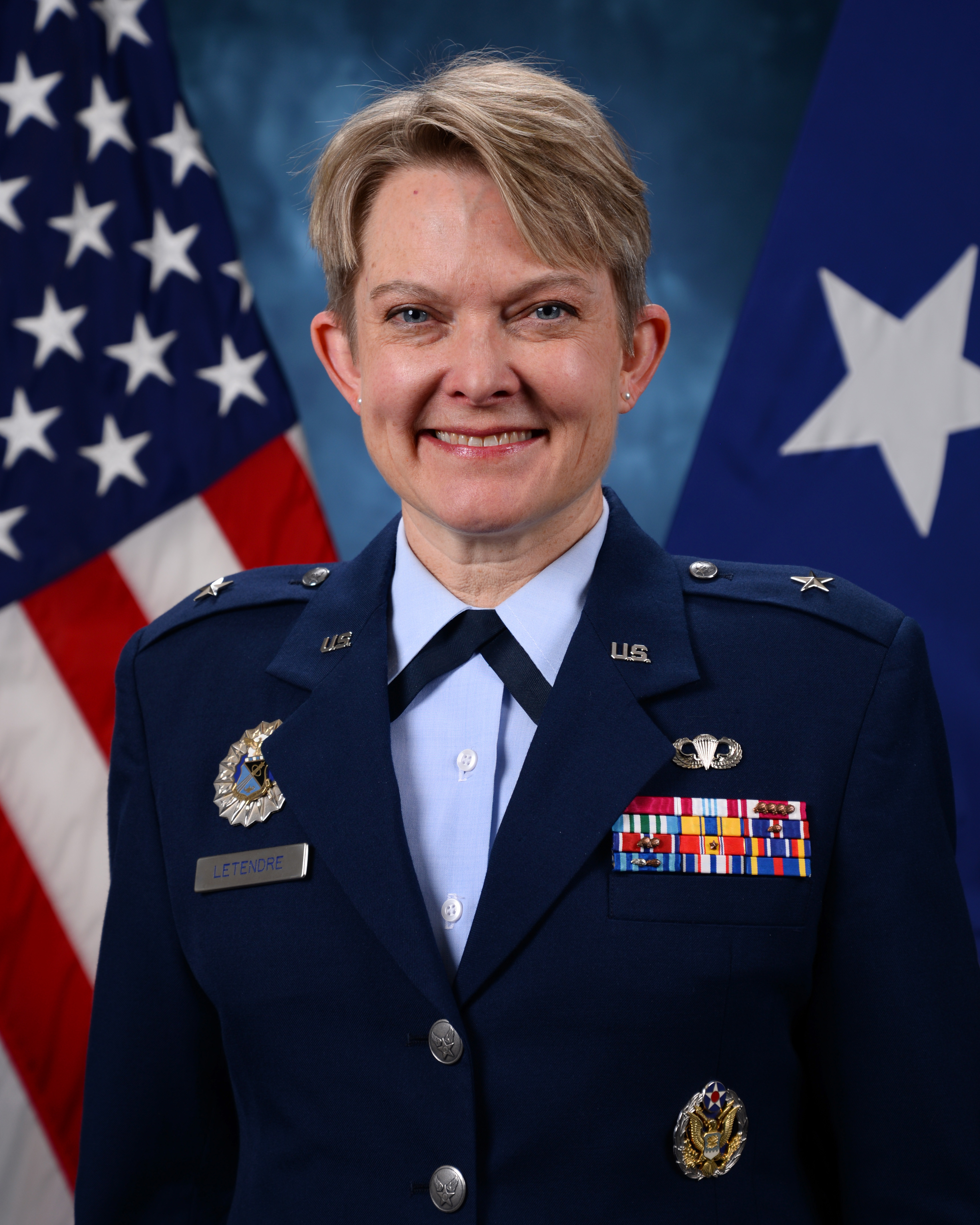
- Alma mater: United States Air Force Academy (BS); University of Washington (JD)
- Military career
- Allegiance: United States
- Branch: United States Air Force
- Service years: 1996–2025
- Rank: Brigadier General
- Awards: Legion of Merit; Defense Meritorious Service Medal; Meritorious Service Medal (4); Joint Service Commendation Medal; Air Force Commendation Medal

Linell Letendre is a retired United States Air Force brigadier general. She most recently served as the dean of the faculty at the U.S. Air Force Academy from 2019 to 2025.

== Early life and education ==
Letendre received a Bachelor of Science in astronautical engineering from the U.S. Air Force Academy in 1996 as a distinguished graduate. While at the academy, she served as the cadet wing commander, the highest-ranking cadet at the institution. In 2001, she received her Juris Doctor with high honors from the University of Washington School of Law. She was named to the Order of the Coif and the Order of the Barristers. In 2003, she graduated from Squadron Officer School as a distinguished graduate. In 2015, she graduated from the Dwight D. Eisenhower School for National Security and Resource Strategy as a distinguished graduate.

== Career ==
Letendre briefly served as an acquisitions officer before being selected to attend law school and become a judge advocate. She served as the primary legal counsel for the Comprehensive Working Group, the committee which ultimately recommended the repeal of "Don't Ask, Don't Tell."

In 2015, Letendre was selected to lead the law department at the U.S. Air Force Academy, a Senate-confirmed position that includes a promotion to colonel.

In 2019, Letendre was selected from more than 40 applicants to replace Andrew Armacost as the Air Force Academy dean of the faculty. As dean, she commands 750 faculty and staff and directs more than $350 million in resources. Letendre's command is responsible for designing and instructing more than 500 courses in 32 disciplines to over 4,000 cadets each year.

== Awards and honors ==
- Legion of Merit
- Defense Meritorious Service Medal
- Meritorious Service Medal with four oak leaf clusters
- Joint Service Commendation Medal
- Air Force Commendation Medal

== Effective dates of promotion ==
Promotions
Insignia	Rank	Date
	Brigadier general	October 2, 2019
	Colonel	July 2, 2015
	Lieutenant colonel	March 1, 2011
	Major	April 1, 2007
	Captain	May 29, 2000
	First lieutenant	May 29, 1998
	Second lieutenant	May 29, 1996

== Assignments ==
- 1. June 1996 – September 1998, project officer, Joint Air-to-Surface Program Office, Eglin Air Force Base, Fla.
- 2. September 1998 – August 2001, Funded Legal Education Program, University of Washington, Seattle
- 3. August 2001 – June 2003, chief of environmental law and general law, 375th Airlift Wing, Scott AFB, Ill.
- 4. June 2003 – June 2004, area defense counsel, Scott AFB, Ill.
- 5. June 2004 – June 2007, assistant professor of law, U.S. Air Force Academy, Colo.
- 6. July 2007 – July 2008, chief of Strategic Communication Branch, Office of the Judge Advocate General, the Pentagon, Arlington, Va.
- 7. July 2008 – November 2009, deputy chief, Military Personnel Branch, General Litigation Division of Air Force Legal Operations Agency, Arlington, Va.
- 8. November 2009 – February 2010, executive officer, Civil Law and Litigation Directorate, Air Force Legal Operations Agency, Arlington, Va.
- 9. February 2010 – December 2010, legal advisor, DoD Comprehensive Review Working Group, the Pentagon, Arlington, Va.
- 10. January 2011 – April 2011, air staff counsel, Administrative Law Division, Office of the Judge Advocate General, the Pentagon, Arlington, Va.
- 11. May 2011 – June 2012, deputy chief, Trial and Appellate Government Counsel Division, Air Force Legal Operations Agency, Joint Base Andrews, Md.
- 12. July 2012 – July 2014, staff judge advocate, 375th Air Mobility Wing, Scott AFB, Ill.
- 13. July 2014 – June 2015, student, Eisenhower School, National Defense University, Fort Lesley J. McNair, Washington, D.C.
- 14. July 2015 – October 2019, permanent professor and head, Department of Law, U.S. Air Force Academy, Colo.
- 15. July 2018 – October 2019, chair, Social Sciences Division, U.S. Air Force Academy, Colo.
- 16. October 2019 – May 2025, dean of the faculty, U.S. Air Force Academy, Colo.
