= Rooms To Go =

American furniture store chain

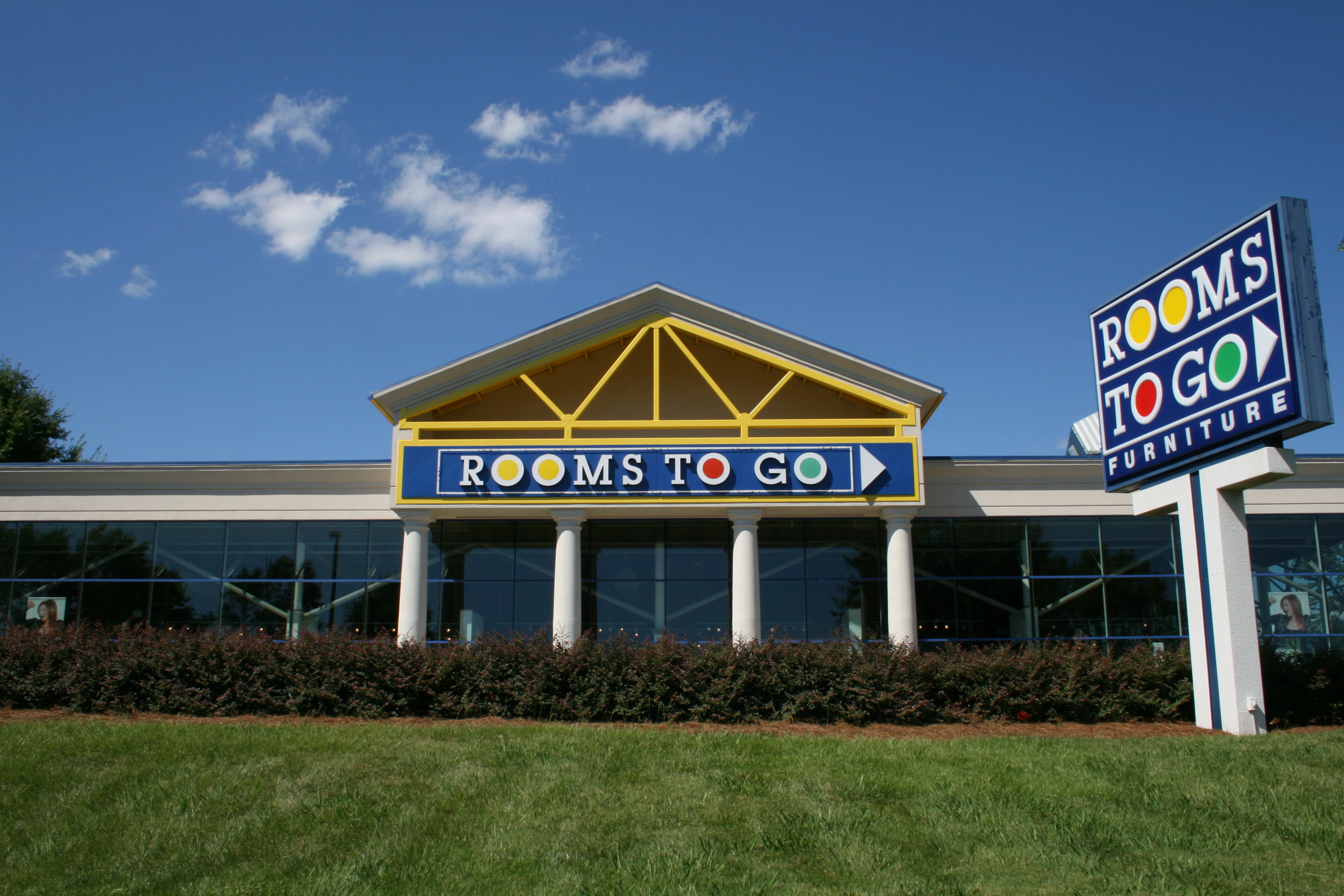
- A Rooms to Go store in Durham, North Carolina
- Type: Private
- Industry: Furniture retail
- Founded: September 7, 1990; 35 years ago in Orlando, Florida
- Founder: Jeffrey Seaman; Morty Seaman
- Headquarters: Seffner, Florida, U.S.
- Number of locations: 159 (May 2024)
- Area served: United States
- Key people: Jeffrey Seaman (Founder and CEO); Morty Seaman (Founder); Eyal Rappoport (President)
- Products: Furniture, bedding, mattresses, home decor, and rugs
- Revenue: ▲US$3.8 billion (2022)
- Number of employees: 7,500 (2022)
- Website: www.roomstogo.com

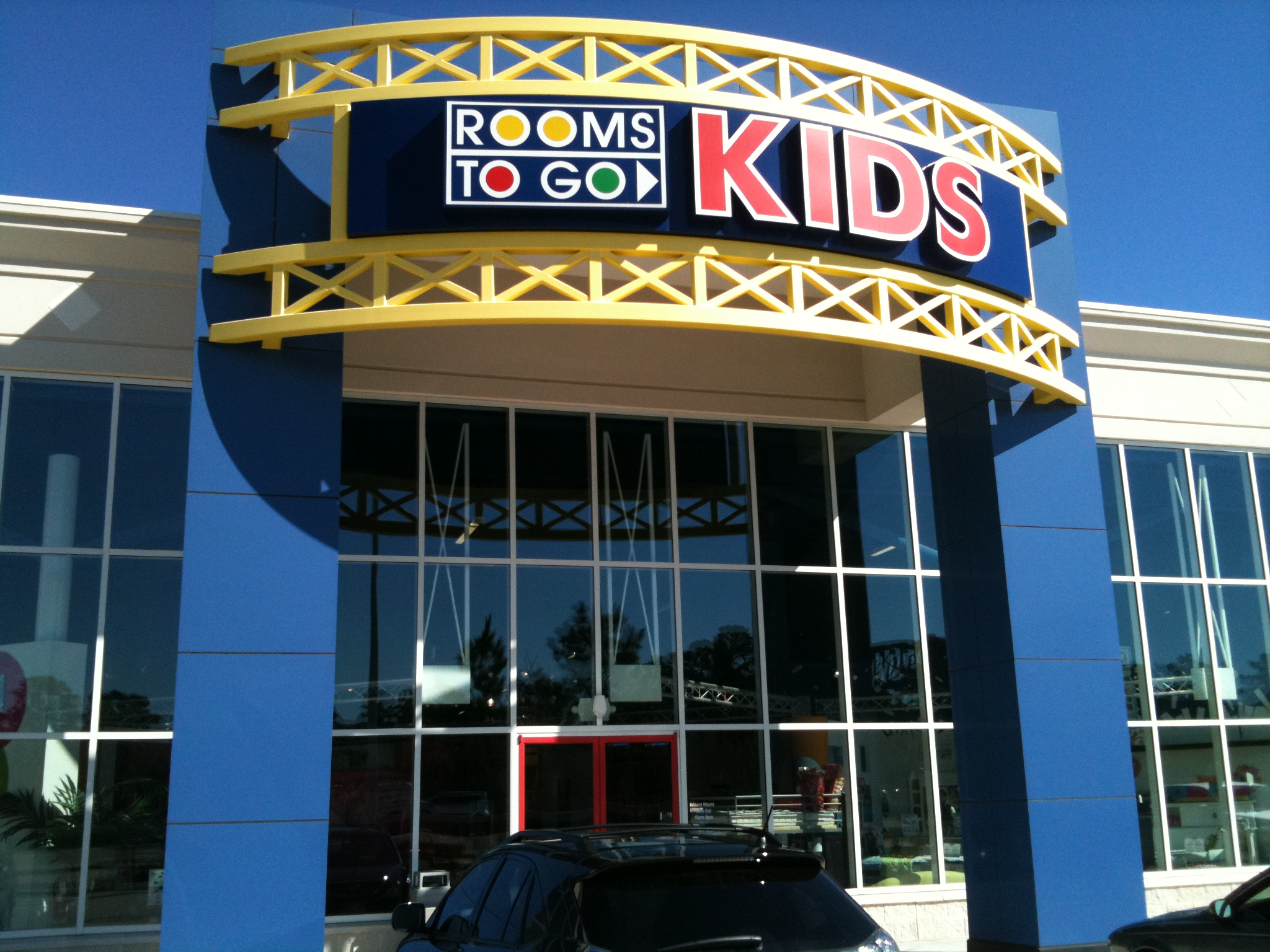
Rooms To Go Kids in The Woodlands, Texas

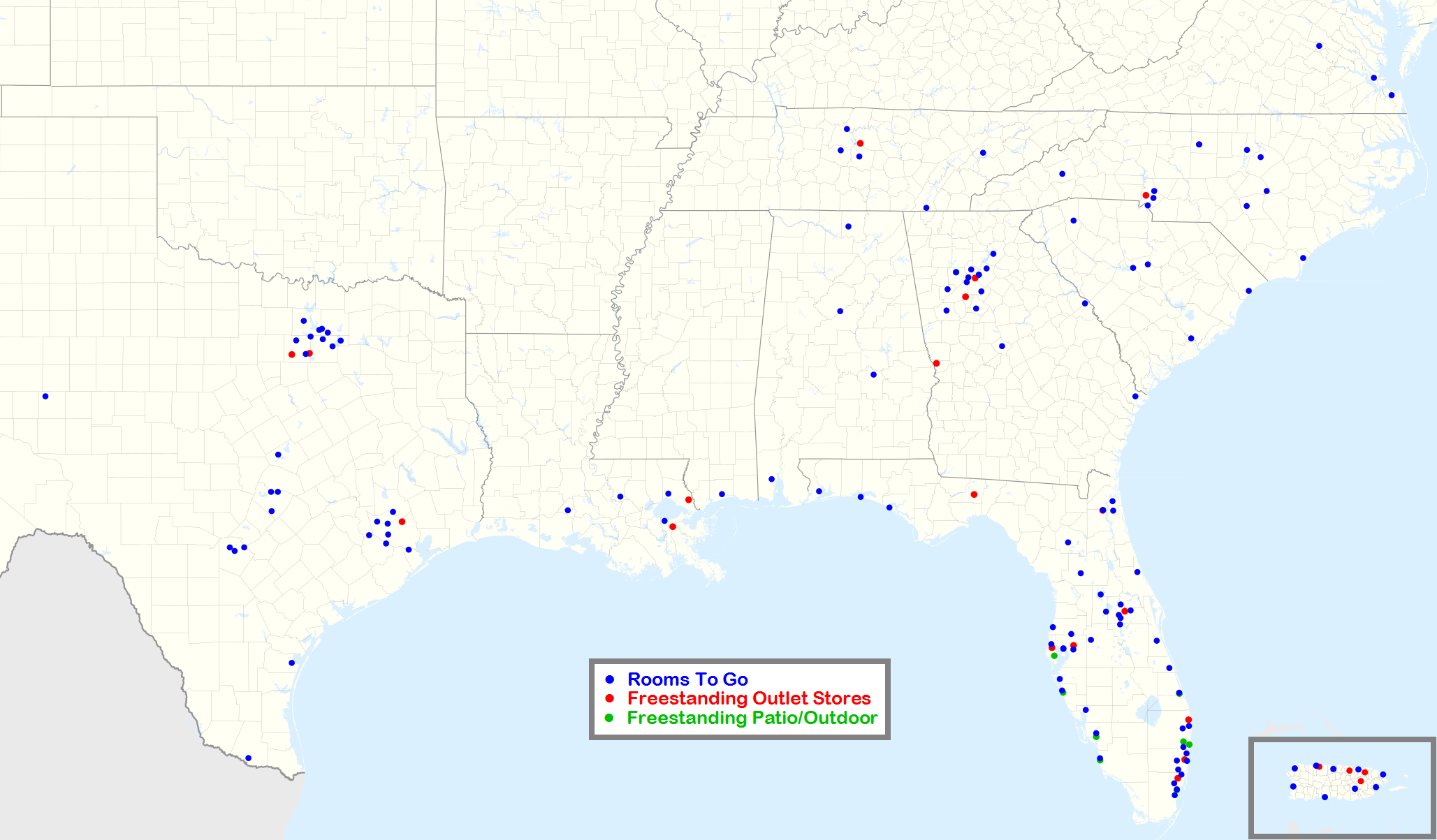
Rooms To Go locations in the US and Puerto Rico, January 2021

Rooms To Go (stylized as ROOMS TO GO ▶) is an American furniture store chain.

The company was founded in September 1990 by Jeffrey Seaman and his father Morty Seaman after they sold Seaman's Furniture. According to Furniture Today, as of 2015 Rooms To Go is the third largest furniture retailer in the US.

== History ==
Rooms To Go was founded in 1990 by Jeffrey and Morty Seaman after selling Seaman's Furniture. They opened the first Rooms To Go in Orlando, Florida on March, 1991. Rooms To Go's founding concept was the sale of whole room packages, using the slogan: "Buy the piece, save a little. Buy the room, save a lot!" Furniture was offered in predesigned rooms, targeted at consumers looking to save both time and money without sacrificing quality. Jeffrey Seaman, who took the lead in developing the concept, envisioned a merchandising approach reflecting successful trends in other sectors of retail, such as bright, colorful stores with large glass walls and a friendly atmosphere. Stores were designed with an open layout so that customers could view the merchandise from multiple vantage points. The company also used an advanced computer system to manage inventory flow.

By 1996, Rooms To Go had become Florida's fastest-growing furniture retailer. In order to avoid saturating the Florida market, Rooms To Go expanded into Atlanta, Georgia; Charlotte, North Carolina; and Chattanooga and Nashville, Tennessee. In 1998, Rooms To Go expanded into Texas, a move that led to a 20 percent growth in revenue from the previous year.

In 1997, Rooms To Go became the first major furniture chain to offer stores exclusively for children's furniture, filling a large gap in the youth market. In 2018, Rooms To Go acquired outdoor furniture store chain Carls Patio and created Rooms To Go Patio, a division specializing in outdoor furniture. In 2023, Rooms To Go acquired The Great American Home Store, a four-store chain in the Memphis, Tennessee region.

== Distribution centers ==
- Suwanee, Georgia
- Dunn, North Carolina
- Arlington, Texas
- Katy, Texas
- Seffner, Florida
- Lakeland, Florida
- Pearl River, Louisiana
- Lebanon, Tennessee

== Products ==
=== Rooms To Go Kids ===
In 1997, Rooms To Go opened its first Rooms To Go Kids location in Marietta, Georgia, a division that specializes in baby and children's furniture.

=== Rooms To Go Patio ===
In 2018, Rooms To Go acquired outdoor furniture store chain Carls Patio and began a rollout of Rooms To Go Patio stores, a division that specializes in patio and other outdoor furniture. Rooms To Go Patio operates both as a standalone store format and as dedicated sections within existing Rooms To Go showrooms.

=== Cindy Crawford Home ===
Rooms To Go began a design partnership with Cindy Crawford in 2005. The Cindy Crawford Home collection focuses on living room, bedroom, and dining room furniture.

=== Disney Collection ===
Also in 2005, Rooms To Go landed Disney's first license to produce children's bedroom suites featuring Disney characters. Rooms To Go's Cinderella, Winnie the Pooh, and Pumpkin Carriage bedrooms were nominated as the most innovative new products launched that year under the Walt Disney & Co. label.

=== NFL Collection ===
In the summer of 2008, Rooms To Go rolled out a licensed line of customizable NFL furniture after striking a deal with the National Football League.

=== Sofia Vergara Collection ===
In March 2013, Rooms To Go announced a partnership with Modern Family star Sofia Vergara. Vergara said: "My relationship with Rooms To Go began over 15 years ago when I moved to the United States as a single mother, and furnished my first apartment entirely from their store." The Sofia Vergara Collection includes contemporary living room, bedroom, and dining room sets.

=== Eric Church "Highway to Home" ===
Rooms To Go began selling Eric Church's "Highway to Home" furniture collection in 2016.
