= 2012 Western Pennsylvania Sting season =

- Owner: Jeff Bollinger
- Head coach: Jeff Bollinger
- Home stadium: Travel Team

Results
- Record: 0–7
- Conference place: 5th
- Playoffs: did not qualify

The 2012 Western Pennsylvania Sting season was the first season and only season for the Ultimate Indoor Football League (UIFL) franchise.

The Sting were originally created to replace the Saginaw Sting, who had left the league to re-join the Continental Indoor Football League (CIFL). The Sting had an agreement to host games at Cambria County War Memorial Arena in Johnstown, Pennsylvania, as well as other cities throughout Western Pennsylvania.

On November 30, 2011, the Sting announced that Paul Pennington would be their first coach in franchise history.

On May 15, 2012, the Sting were suspended by the league due to a lack of funds.

The Sting were able to finish the season with an 0-7 record, and failed to qualify for the playoffs.

== Schedule ==
Key: Win Tie Loss Bye

=== Regular season ===
| Week | Day | Date | Opponent | Results | | Location |
| Week | Day | Date | Opponent | Score | Record | Location |
|---|---|---|---|---|---|---|
| 1 | Friday | March 1 | at Erie Explosion | L 7-81 | 0-1 | Louis J. Tullio Arena |
| 2 | Saturday | March 10 | at Marion Blue Racers | L 27-68 | 0-2 | Veterans Memorial Coliseum |
| 3 | BYE | | | | | |
| 4 | Friday | March 23 | at Erie Explosion | L 34-88 | 0-3 | Louis J. Tullio Arena |
| 5 | Friday | March 30 | at Johnstown Generals | L 30-46 | 0-4 | Cambria County War Memorial Arena |
| 6 | Saturday | April 7 | at Cincinnati Commandos | L 20-76 | 0-5 | Cincinnati Gardens |
| 7 | BYE | | | | | |
| 8 | BYE | | | | | |
| 9 | Sunday | April 29 | at Eastern Kentucky Drillers | L 8-105 | 0-6 | Eastern Kentucky Expo Center |
| 10 | Saturday | May 5 | at Johnstown Generals | Cancelled | 0-6 | Cambria County War Memorial Arena |
| 11 | Monday | May 14 | at Mississippi Hound Dogs | Cancelled | 0-6 | BancorpSouth Arena |
| 12 | BYE | | | | | |
| 13 | Saturday | May 26 | at Johnstown Generals | L 6-33 | 0-7 | Cambria County War Memorial Arena |
| 14 | Saturday | June 2 | at Lakeland Raiders | Cancelled | 0-7 | Lakeland Center |
| 15 | Saturday | June 9 | at Florida Tarpons | Cancelled | 0-7 | Germain Arena |

== Standings ==
2012 United Indoor Football League
| Team | Conference | | | Overall | | | | |
| Team | W | L | PCT | W | L | PCT | PF | PA |
|---|---|---|---|---|---|---|---|---|
Northern Conference
| Cincinnati Commandos-y | 7 | 2 | .778 | 8 | 2 | .800 | 594 | 373 |
| Erie Explosion-x | 7 | 3 | .700 | 8 | 3 | .727 | 748 | 362 |
| Marion Blue Racers-x | 5 | 4 | .556 | 6 | 5 | .636 | 602 | 467 |
| Johnstown Generals | 3 | 6 | .333 | 3 | 6 | .333 | 264 | 441 |
| Western Pennsylvania Sting | 0 | 6 | .000 | 0 | 7 | .000 | 132 | 497 |
Southern Conference
| Florida Tarpons-y | 11 | 0 | 1.000 | 11 | 0 | 1.000 | 687 | 287 |
| Eastern Kentucky Drillers | 5 | 4 | .556 | 6 | 4 | .600 | 613 | 361 |
| Lakeland Raiders-x | 5 | 5 | .500 | 6 | 5 | .545 | 639 | 379 |
| Rome Rampage | 1 | 6 | .143 | 1 | 6 | .143 | 100 | 462 |
| Mississippi Hound Dogs | 1 | 9 | .100 | 1 | 9 | .100 | 281 | 559 |

== Final roster ==
2012 Western Pennsylvania Sting roster
| Quarterbacks: 12 Tyler Huenther; Running backs: 1 Marcus Pollard; Wide receivers: 4 A. J. Jackson; [21]Sean Malafronte: -- Corey Oakes; 3 Will Peake; 2 Art Peck | Offensive linemen: currently vacant; Defensive linemen: 6 Chris Booth; 92 Ryan DeFrancesco; 48 Ryan Greene; 8 LaRoi Johnson; 22 Sean Moore | Linebackers: 14 Josh Stegna; Defensive backs: -- Mario Henry; 7 Jeremy Stewart; 21 Darrell Wolford; Kickers: 15 Joe Lindway | Injured reserve: currently vacant; Inactive list: 12 Rod Rutherford QB; rookies in italics Roster updated May 26, 2012; 16 Active, 1 Inactive |
