= 2012 Florida Tarpons season =

- Owner: Michael Taylor; Andrew Haines
- General manager: Michael Taylor
- Head coach: Michael Taylor
- Home stadium: Germain Arena; 11000 Everblades Parkway; Estero, FL 33928

Results
- Record: 11-0
- Conference place: 1st
- Playoffs: Won Southern Conference Championship 60-29 (Raiders); Lost Ultimate Bowl II 44-62 (Commandos)

The 2012 Florida Tarpons season was the first season for the Ultimate Indoor Football League (UIFL) franchise.

== Schedule ==
Key: Win Tie Loss Bye

=== Regular season ===
All start times are local to home team

Week	Day	Date	Opponent	Results		Location
Week	Day	Date	Opponent	Score	Record	Location
1	BYE					
2	Friday	March 9	Mississippi Hound Dogs	W 58-35	1-0	Germain Arena
3	BYE					
4	Sunday	March 25	Lakeland Raiders	W 62-47	2-0	Germain Arena
5	Friday	March 30	at Mississippi Hound Dogs	W 45-22	3-0	BancorpSouth Arena
6	Friday	April 6	Rome Rampage	W 60-7	4-0	Germain Arena
7	Saturday	April 14	at Lakeland Raiders	W 59-51	5-0	Lakeland Center
8	BYE					
9	Saturday	April 28	Mississippi Hound Dogs	W 58-26	6-0	Germain Arena
10	Sunday	May 6	Lakeland Raiders	W 55-24	7-0	Germain Arena
11	Monday	May 14	at Lakeland Raiders	W 57-42	8-0	Lakeland Center
12	Monday	May 21	Rome Rampage	W 68-2	9-0	Germain Arena
13	Saturday	May 26	Mississippi Hound Dogs	W 74-13	10-0	Germain Arena
14	BYE					
15	Saturday	June 9	West Palm Beach Phantoms	W 91-18	11-0	Germain Arena

=== Postseason ===
Round	Day	Date	Opponent	Results		Location
Round	Day	Date	Opponent	Score	Record	Location
Southern Semifinals	BYE					
Southern Championship	Monday	June 25	Lakeland Raiders	W 60-29	1-0	Germain Arena
Ultimate Bowl II	Monday	July 2	Cincinnati Commandos	L 44-62	1-1	Germain Arena

== Standings ==
2012 United Indoor Football League
Team	Conference			Overall				
Team	W	L	PCT	W	L	PCT	PF	PA
Northern Conference
Cincinnati Commandos-y	7	2	.778	8	2	.800	594	373
Erie Explosion-x	7	3	.700	8	3	.727	748	362
Marion Blue Racers-x	5	4	.556	6	5	.636	602	467
Johnstown Generals	3	6	.333	3	6	.333	264	441
Western Pennsylvania Sting	0	6	.000	0	7	.000	132	497
Southern Conference
Florida Tarpons-y	11	0	1.000	11	0	1.000	687	287
Eastern Kentucky Drillers	5	4	.556	6	4	.600	613	361
Lakeland Raiders-x	5	5	.500	6	5	.545	639	379
Rome Rampage	1	6	.143	1	6	.143	100	462
Mississippi Hound Dogs	1	9	.100	1	9	.100	281	559

y - clinched conference title x - clinched playoff spot

== Roster ==
2012 Florida Tarpons roster
Quarterbacks: 7 Chris Wallace; Running backs: Currently vacant; Wide receivers: 3 Donald Fusilier; -- Robert Jordan; 4 Chris McKinney; 5 Carlos Singleton	Offensive linemen: 77 James Barker; -- Sean Callahan; -- Greg Walls; Defensive linemen: -- Josh Long; -- Darrell Roseman; 26 Steven Turner	Linebackers: -- Harriel Moore; -- Tavares Woodley; Defensive backs: -- Lance Burns; -- Terrance Jones; 2 Meenyus Miller; -- E. J. Whitley; 21 Willie Williams; Kickers: 20 Ross Gornall	Injured reserve: Currently vacant; Exempt list: Currently vacant; Rookies in italics Roster updated July 2, 2012; 19 Active, 0 Inactive
