= 2012 Lakeland Raiders season =

- Owner: Michael Mink; Robert Tannenbaum
- General manager: Michael Mink
- Head coach: Michael Mink
- Home stadium: Lakeland Center

Results
- Record: 6–5
- Conference place: 1st
- Playoffs: Lost Southern Conference Championship 29–60 (Tarpons)

The 2012 Lakeland Raiders season was the first season for the Ultimate Indoor Football League (UIFL) franchise.

== Schedule ==
Key: Win Tie Loss Bye

=== Regular season ===
All start times are local to home team

Week	Day	Date	Opponent	Results		Location
Week	Day	Date	Opponent	Score	Record	Location
1	BYE					
2	Saturday	March 10	Rome Rampage	W 63–24	1–0	Lakeland Center
3	Saturday	March 17	at Mississippi Hound Dogs	W 75–24	2–0	BancorpSouth Arena
4	Sunday	March 25	at Florida Tarpons	L 47–62	2–1	Germain Arena
5	BYE					
6	Saturday	April 7	at Mississippi Hound Dog	W 60–12	3–1	BancorpSouth Arena
7	Saturday	April 14	Florida Tarpons	L 51–59	3–2	Lakeland Center
8	BYE					
9	Saturday	April 28	Rome Rampage	W 106–6	4–2	Lakeland Center
10	Sunday	May 6	at Florida Tarpons	L 24–55	4–3	Germain Arena
11	Monday	May 14	Florida Tarpons	L 42–57	4–4	Lakeland Center
12	Monday	May 21	at Eastern Kentucky Drillers	L 20–36	4–5	Eastern Kentucky Expo Center
13	Saturday	May 26	Eastern Kentucky Drillers	W 51–44	5–5	Lakeland Center
14	Saturday	June 2	West Palm Beach Phantoms	W 100–0	6–5	Lakeland Center
15	BYE					

=== Postseason ===
Round	Day	Date	Opponent	Results		Location
Round	Day	Date	Opponent	Score	Record	Location
Southern Semifinals	BYE					
Southern Championship	Monday	June 25	at Florida Tarpons	L 29–60	1–0	Germain Arena

== Standings ==
2012 United Indoor Football League
Team	Conference			Overall				
Team	W	L	PCT	W	L	PCT	PF	PA
Northern Conference
Cincinnati Commandos-y	7	2	.778	8	2	.800	594	373
Erie Explosion-x	7	3	.700	8	3	.727	748	362
Marion Blue Racers-x	5	4	.556	6	5	.636	602	467
Johnstown Generals	3	6	.333	3	6	.333	264	441
Western Pennsylvania Sting	0	6	.000	0	7	.000	132	497
Southern Conference
Florida Tarpons-y	11	0	1.000	11	0	1.000	687	287
Eastern Kentucky Drillers	5	4	.556	6	4	.600	613	361
Lakeland Raiders-x	5	5	.500	6	5	.545	639	379
Rome Rampage	1	6	.143	1	6	.143	100	462
Mississippi Hound Dogs	1	9	.100	1	9	.100	281	559

y - clinched conference title x - clinched playoff spot

== Roster ==
2012 Lakeland Raiders roster
Quarterbacks: 9 Brian Harris; -- Myqual Spann; Running backs: Currently vacant; Wide receivers: Currently vacant	Offensive linemen: Currently vacant; Defensive linemen: Currently vacant	Linebackers: Drametrice Smith; Defensive backs: Currently vacant; Kickers: -- Joshua Smith	Injured reserve: Currently vacant; Exempt list: Currently vacant; Rookies in italics Roster updated June 25, 2012; 1 Active, 0 Inactive
