= 2012 Rome Rampage season =

American indoor football team season

- Owner: Kacee Smith
- General manager: Kacee Smith
- Head coach: Joe Micco
- Home stadium: Travel team

Results
- Record: 1-6
- Conference place: 4th
- Playoffs: did not qualify

The 2012 Rome Rampage season was the first season for the United Indoor Football League (UIFL) franchise.

On March 5, 2011, it was announced that indoor American football would be returning to Rome, Georgia in the form of the Rome River Dogs. On May 24, 2011, the River Dogs announced that they would be changing their name to the Rome Rampage, and that they would be playing at the Forum Civic Center. On May 31, 2011, the Rampage introduced Joe Micco as the franchise's first ever head coach.

== Schedule ==
Key: Win Tie Loss Bye

=== Regular season ===
All start times are local to home team

Week	Day	Date	Opponent	Results		Location
Week	Day	Date	Opponent	Score	Record	Location
1	Saturday	March 3	at Mississippi Hound Dogs	W 35-30	1-0	BancorpSouth Arena
2	Saturday	March 10	at Lakeland Raiders	L 24-63	1-1	Lakeland Center
3	BYE					
4	Friday	March 23	at Mississippi Hound Dogs	L 6-53	1-2	BancorpSouth Arena
5	BYE					
6	Friday	April 6	at Florida Tarpons	L 7-60	1-3	Germain Arena
7	Sunday	April 15	at Eastern Kentucky Drillers	L 20-82	1-4	Eastern Kentucky Expo Center
8	BYE					
9	Friday	April 27	at Lakeland Raiders	L 6-106	1-5	Lakeland Center
10	BYE					
11	Saturday	May 12	at Cincinnati Commandos	Cancelled	1-5	Cincinnati Gardens
12	Monday	May 21	at Florida Tarpons	L 2-68	1-6	Germain Arena
13	BYE					
14	BYE					
15	BYE					

== Standings ==
2012 United Indoor Football League
Team	Conference			Overall				
Team	W	L	PCT	W	L	PCT	PF	PA
Northern Conference
Cincinnati Commandos-y	7	2	.778	8	2	.800	594	373
Erie Explosion-x	7	3	.700	8	3	.727	748	362
Marion Blue Racers-x	5	4	.556	6	5	.636	602	467
Johnstown Generals	3	6	.333	3	6	.333	264	441
Western Pennsylvania Sting	0	6	.000	0	7	.000	132	497
Southern Conference
Florida Tarpons-y	11	0	1.000	11	0	1.000	687	287
Eastern Kentucky Drillers	5	4	.556	6	4	.600	613	361
Lakeland Raiders-x	5	5	.500	6	5	.545	639	379
Rome Rampage	1	6	.143	1	6	.143	100	462
Mississippi Hound Dogs	1	9	.100	1	9	.100	281	559

y - clinched conference title x - clinched playoff spot
