= 2012 Cincinnati Commandos season =

- Owner: Dennis Whitman; Paul Napier
- General manager: Jason Buckley
- Head coach: Billy Back
- Home stadium: Cincinnati Gardens; 2250 Seymour Avenue; Cincinnati, OH 45212

Results
- Record: 7–2 (6–2)
- Conference place: 1st
- Playoffs: Won Northern Conference Championship 60-42 (Explosion); Won Ultimate Bowl II 62-44 (Tarpons)

The 2012 Cincinnati Commandos season was the 3rd season for the franchise, and their first as a member of the Northern Conference of the United Indoor Football League (UIFL).

Just one month after their 2011 CIFL Championship Game victory, the Commandos announced they were leaving the Continental Indoor Football League (CIFL) to join the UIFL. On August 23, 2011, it was announced that Bill Back would return as head coach for a 3rd season with the Commandos

The Commandos finished the regular season 8-2 (7–2 in the Northern Conference), clinching the first round by with the top spot in the Northern Conference. The Commandos advanced to Ultimate Bowl II with a 60–42 victory over the Erie Explosion. The Commandos defeated the Florida Tarpons, 62-44 clinching their third consecutive championship.

== Schedule ==
Key: Win Tie Loss Bye

=== Regular season ===
Week	Day	Date	Opponent	Results		Location
Week	Day	Date	Opponent	Score	Record	Location
1	Saturday	March 3	Johnstown Generals	W 49–28	1–0	Cincinnati Gardens
2	Friday	March 9	at Eastern Kentucky Drillers	W 64–51	2–0	Eastern Kentucky Expo Center
3	BYE					
4	Saturday	March 24	Huntington Wildcatz	W 104-12	3–0	Cincinnati Gardens
5	BYE					
6	Saturday	April 7	Western Pennsylvania Sting	W 76–20	4–0	Cincinnati Gardens
7	BYE					
8	Sunday	April 22	at Erie Explosion	W 55–34	5–0	Louis J. Tullio Arena
9	Saturday	April 28	Marion Blue Racers	W 58–38	6–0	Cincinnati Gardens
10	Saturday	May 5	at Marion Blue Racers	W 61–53	7–0	Veterans Memorial Coliseum
11	Saturday	May 12	Rome Rampage	Cancelled	7–0	Cincinnati Gardens
12	Saturday	May 19	at Marion Blue Racers	L 49–51	7–1	Veterans Memorial Coliseum
13	Saturday	May 26	Erie Explosion	L 18–62	7–2	Cincinnati Gardens
14	Saturday	June 2	Marion Blue Racers	W 60–24	8–2	Cincinnati Gardens
15	BYE					

=== Postseason ===
Round	Day	Date	Opponent	Results		Location
Round	Day	Date	Opponent	Score	Record	Location
Northern Semifinals	BYE					
Northern Championship	Saturday	June 23	Erie Explosion	W 62–40	1–0	Cincinnati Gardens
Ultimate Bowl II	Monday	July 2	at Florida Tarpons	W 62–44	2–0	Germain Arena

=== Standings ===
2012 United Indoor Football League
Team	Conference			Overall				
Team	W	L	PCT	W	L	PCT	PF	PA
Northern Conference
Cincinnati Commandos-y	7	2	.778	8	2	.800	594	373
Erie Explosion-x	7	3	.700	8	3	.727	748	362
Marion Blue Racers-x	5	4	.556	6	5	.636	602	467
Johnstown Generals	3	6	.333	3	6	.333	264	441
Western Pennsylvania Sting	0	6	.000	0	7	.000	132	497
Southern Conference
Florida Tarpons-y	11	0	1.000	11	0	1.000	687	287
Eastern Kentucky Drillers	5	4	.556	6	4	.600	613	361
Lakeland Raiders-x	5	5	.500	6	5	.545	639	379
Rome Rampage	1	6	.143	1	6	.143	100	462
Mississippi Hound Dogs	1	9	.100	1	9	.100	281	559

y - clinched conference title

x - clinched playoff spot

== Roster ==
Cincinnati Commandos roster
Quarterbacks: 13 Tyler Sheehan; Running backs: 23 Derrick Moss; 33 Andy Stuckert; Wide receivers: 12 Brandon Boehm; -- Eric Hicks; 5 Shawn McGarity; 3 Kyenes Mincy	Offensive linemen: 79 Richard Deutch; 80 James Howard; 88 Frank Straub; Defensive linemen: 99 D'arrell Brown; 95 Terrill Byrd; 55 Thomas Claggett; 51 James Spikes	Linebackers: 37 Antwone Canady; 10 Tony Longo; 37 Santino Turnbow; Defensive backs: 1 Darren Barnett; 6 Markkus Davis; 17 Jeff Demery; 28 Jason Neely; 27 Corry Stewart; 4 E. J. Underwood; Kickers: currently vacant	Injured reserve: currently vacant; Exempt list: currently vacant; Practice squad: currently vacant; rookies in italics Roster updated September 19, 2012; 22 Active, 0 Inactive, 0 PS

== Staff ==
2012 Cincinnati Commandos staff
Front office: Co-Owner – Dennis Whitman; Co-Owner – Paul Napier; General manager – Jason Buckley; Director of corporate sales – Hank Reed; Public and community relations – All-Star PR LLC; Director of gameday operations – Mike Hershey; Assistant Director of GameDay Operations - Andrew Pifer; Equipment Manager - Colin Lap; Head coach: Head coach – Billy Back	Offensive coaches: Offensive coordinator – Billy Back; Running Backs - Keith Brooks; Wide receivers – J.C. Baker; Offensive line – Josh Newren; Defensive coaches: Defensive coordinator – Chris Taylor; Defensive line – Sean Middlebrooks; Linebackers –; Secondary – Kelly Sims
