= 2012 Marion Blue Racers season =

- Owner: LaMonte and Shavonne Coleman
- General manager: LaMonte Coleman
- Head coach: Lorenzo Styles (resigned March 30: 3-1 record); Marc Huddleston (interim)
- Home stadium: Veterans Memorial Coliseum; 220 East Fairground Street; Marion, OH 43302

Results
- Record: 7–5
- Conference place: 3rd
- Playoffs: Lost Semifinals 47-56 (Explosion)

The 2012 Marion Blue Racers season was the 2nd season for the United Indoor Football League (UIFL) franchise.

On July 5, 2011, the Blue Racers announced they were leaving the CIFL to join the Ultimate Indoor Football League. The Blue Racers were added as a member of the Northern Conference, re-uniting with, their arch-rivals, the Cincinnati Commandos. On August 17, 2011, Lorenzo Styles was named the 3rd head coach in franchise history. In February, team CEO and General Manager, LaMonte Coleman, took a coaching position with the Pittsburgh Power of the Arena Football League. The following day, Ryan Sawyer was named the team's interim general manager while Coleman was coaching in Pittsburgh. On March 30, 2012, Styles resigned as the head coach of the Blue Racers after compiling a 3-1 record, citing personal reason as the reason for his resignation. Offensive Coordinator Marc Huddleston, took over as the team's head coach. The team remained a strong pipeline for the Pittsburgh Power, as both the team's kickers, Trey Kramer and Seth Burkholder, signed with the team. The Blue Racers finished the season with a 7–4 record, earning the 3rd seed in the UIFL North playoff. The team traveled to play the second seeded Erie Explosion, where the game was played at a high school field, where the team had built walls for the playing field. It is the first time an indoor football game, has been played outdoors. The Explosion went on to defeat the Blue Racers 56–47, after the Blue Racers had led 22–0 early in the game.

== Schedule ==
Key: Win Tie Loss Bye

=== Regular season ===
Week	Day	Date	Opponent	Results		Location
Week	Day	Date	Opponent	Score	Record	Location
1	Saturday	March 3	Eastern Kentucky Drillers	W 48-34	1-0	Veterans Memorial Coliseum
2	Saturday	March 10	Western Pennsylvania Sting	W 68-27	2-0	Veterans Memorial Coliseum
3	Sunday	March 18	at Eastern Kentucky Drillers	L 47-61	2-1	Eastern Kentucky Expo Center
4	Saturday	March 24	Johnstown Generals	W 41-19	3-1	Veterans Memorial Coliseum
5	BYE					
6	Saturday	April 7	at Johnstown Generals	W 56-23	4-1	Cambria County War Memorial Arena
7	BYE					
8	Saturday	April 21	Huntington Wildcatz	W 98-6	5-1	Veterans Memorial Coliseum
9	Saturday	April 28	at Cincinnati Commandos	L 38-58	5-2	Cincinnati Gardens
10	Saturday	May 5	Cincinnati Commandos	L 53-61	5-3	Veterans Memorial Coliseum
11	BYE					
12	Saturday	May 19	Cincinnati Commandos	W 51-49	6-3	Veterans Memorial Coliseum
13	BYE					
14	Saturday	June 2	at Cincinnati Commandos	L 24-30	6-4	Cincinnati Gardens
15	Saturday	June 9	Erie Explosion	L 64-65 (OT)	6-5	Veterans Memorial Coliseum

=== Postseason ===
Round	Day	Date	Opponent	Results		Location
Round	Day	Date	Opponent	Score	Record	Location
Northern Semifinals	Saturday	June 16	at Erie Explosion	L 47-56	0-1	Cathedral Preparatory School

== Standings ==
2012 United Indoor Football League
Team	Conference			Overall				
Team	W	L	PCT	W	L	PCT	PF	PA
Northern Conference
Cincinnati Commandos-y	7	2	.778	8	2	.800	594	373
Erie Explosion-x	7	3	.700	8	3	.727	748	362
Marion Blue Racers-x	5	4	.556	6	5	.636	602	467
Johnstown Generals	3	6	.333	3	6	.333	264	441
Western Pennsylvania Sting	0	6	.000	0	7	.000	132	497
Southern Conference
Florida Tarpons-y	11	0	1.000	11	0	1.000	687	287
Eastern Kentucky Drillers	5	4	.556	6	4	.600	613	361
Lakeland Raiders-x	5	5	.500	6	5	.545	639	379
Rome Rampage	1	6	.143	1	6	.143	100	462
Mississippi Hound Dogs	1	9	.100	1	9	.100	281	559

y - clinched regular-season title x - clinched playoff spot

== Final roster ==
2012 Marion Blue Racers roster
Quarterbacks: 8 Boo Jackson; Offensive backs: 7 Victor Tolbert; Receivers: 27 Melvin Bryant; 25 Ricky Crawford; 15 Travis Lewis; 9 Abrielle Taylor; 3 Brandon Williams	Offensive linemen: 50 J.T. Haynes; 75 Robert Price; 77 Kris Stafford; Defensive linemen: 92 Robert Lewis; 95 Curtis McGhee; 11 Thomas McKenzie	Linebackers: 10 Lambert Budzinski; 32 Gaines Burnett; 33 Raymond Saunders; Defensive backs: 4 Dontrellius Burrows; 1 Marcus Dorsey; 21 Bryceson Lawrence; 24 Johnnie Taylor III; Kickers: 14 Trey Kramer	Injured Reserve: 5 Josh Harris QB; Exempt List: -- Seth Burkholder K; Practice squad: currently vacant; rookies in italics Roster updated May 7, 2012; 23 Active, 2 Inactive, 0 PS
