= 2012 Mississippi Hound Dogs season =

- Owner: Marty Cooper (removed by UIFL April 24); UIFL (interim)
- General manager: Marty Cooper
- Head coach: Martino Theus (fired March 20: 0-3 record); Eric Bingham (fired April 24: 1-3 record); Martino Theus (interim)
- Home stadium: BancorpSouth Arena; 375 East Main Street; Tupelo, MS 38804

Results
- Record: 1-9
- Conference place: 5th
- Playoffs: did not qualify

The 2012 Mississippi Hound Dogs season was the 1st and only season for the United Indoor Football League (UIFL) franchise.

On March 20, 2012, head coach Martino Theus was fired after an 0-3 start for the Hound Dogs. Former indoor player, Eric Bingham was hired as his replacement. However, when the UIFL stepped in when owner Marty Cooper couldn't afford the team, the UIFL took over the team and named Martino Theus the head coach once again. The Hound Dogs cancelled all remaining home games, but fulfilled all their remaining road games.

== Schedule ==
Key: Win Tie Loss Bye

=== Regular season ===
All start times are local to home team

Week	Day	Date	Opponent	Results		Location
Week	Day	Date	Opponent	Score	Record	Location
1	Saturday	March 3	Rome Rampage	L 30-35	0-1	BancorpSouth Arena
2	Friday	March 9	at Florida Tarpons	L 35-58	0-2	Germain Arena
3	Saturday	March 17	at Lakeland Raiders	L 27-75	0-3	Lakeland Center
4	Friday	March 23	Rome Rampage	W 53-6	1-3	BancorpSouth Arena
5	Friday	March 30	Florida Tarpons	L 22-45	1-4	BancorpSouth Arena
6	Saturday	April 7	Lakeland Raiders	L 12-60	1-5	BancorpSouth Arena
7	BYE					
8	Saturday	April 21	Eastern Kentucky Drillers	L 25-60	1-6	BancorpSouth Arena
9	Saturday	April 28	at Florida Tarpons	L 26-58	1-7	Germain Arena
10	BYE					
11	Saturday	May 14	Western Pennsylvania Sting	Cancelled	1-7	BancorpSouth Arena
12	BYE					
13	Saturday	May 26	at Florida Tarpons	L 13-74	1-8	Germain Arena
14	Saturday	June 2	at Eastern Kentucky Drillers	L 16-88	1-9	Eastern Kentucky Expo Center
15	BYE					

== Standings ==
2012 United Indoor Football League
Team	Conference			Overall				
Team	W	L	PCT	W	L	PCT	PF	PA
Northern Conference
Cincinnati Commandos-y	7	2	.778	8	2	.800	594	373
Erie Explosion-x	7	3	.700	8	3	.727	748	362
Marion Blue Racers-x	5	4	.556	6	5	.636	602	467
Johnstown Generals	3	6	.333	3	6	.333	264	441
Western Pennsylvania Sting	0	6	.000	0	7	.000	132	497
Southern Conference
Florida Tarpons-y	11	0	1.000	11	0	1.000	687	287
Eastern Kentucky Drillers	5	4	.556	6	4	.600	613	361
Lakeland Raiders-x	5	5	.500	6	5	.545	639	379
Rome Rampage	1	6	.143	1	6	.143	100	462
Mississippi Hound Dogs	1	9	.100	1	9	.100	281	559

y - clinched conference title x - clinched playoff spot

== Roster ==
2012 Mississippi Hound Dogs roster
Quarterbacks: -- Jeremy Dixon; -- Michael Leadbetter; -- Richard McFadden; Running backs: currently vacant; Wide receivers: -- Reggie Ellis; -- Roderick Jefferson; -- Taurean Rhetta; -- Jeremy Satchel; -- Sperguron	Offensive linemen: -- Desmoine Ware; Defensive linemen: -- Sterling Williams	Linebackers: -- Brandon Bruce; 14 Devon Lewis; Defensive backs: -- Cordney Sanders; -- Corey Sanders]; -- Arthur Williams; Kickers: -- Tyler Lorenz	Injured Reserve: -- Josh Smith WR; Exempt List: currently vacant; Practice squad: currently vacant; rookies in italics; Roster updated October 4, 2011; 16 Active, 1 Inactive, 0 PS
