= 2014 Corpus Christi Fury season =

- Owner: Chad Dittman
- Head coach: LaDaniel Marshall
- Home stadium: American Bank Center; 1901 North Shoreline; Corpus Christi, TX 78401

Results
- Record: 5-0
- League place: 1st
- Playoffs: Won Ultimate Bowl IV 60-23 (Tarpons)

The 2014 Corpus Christi Fury season was the 12th season for the franchise, and their second as a member of the Ultimate Indoor Football League (UIFL).

== Schedule ==
Key: Win Tie Loss Bye

=== Regular season ===
All start times are local to home team

Week	Day	Date	Opponent	Results		Location
Week	Day	Date	Opponent	Score	Record	Location
1	Sunday	May 18	Missouri Voodoo	W 61-20	1-0	American Bank Center
2	Sunday	May 25	at Florida Tarpons	W 68-38	2-0	Germain Arena
3	Saturday	June 7	at Missouri Voodoo	W 60-30	3-0	Mediacom Ice Park
4	Sunday	June 15	at Miami Inferno	W 42-33	4-0	BankUnited Center
5	Saturday	June 21	Florida Tarpons	W 80-62	5-0	American Bank Center
6	Saturday	June 28	Missouri Voodoo	Cancelled	5-0	American Bank Center
7	BYE					
8	Saturday	July 12	Miami Inferno	Cancelled	5-0	American Bank Center
9		July	at Missouri Voodoo	Cancelled	5-0	Mediacom Ice Park

=== Postseason ===
Round	Day	Date	Opponent	Results		Location
Round	Day	Date	Opponent	Score	Record	Location
Ultimate Bowl IV	Saturday	August 2	Florida Tarpons	W 60-23	1-0	American Bank Center

== Standings ==
2014 UIFL standings
Team	W	L	PCT	PF	PA	STK
y-Corpus Christi Fury	5	0	1.000	311	183	W5
Miami Inferno	4	1	.800	284	139	W2
x-Florida Tarpons	1	4	.200	262	270	L2
Missouri Voodoo	0	5	.000	78	343	L5

y - clinched conference title x - clinched playoff spot

== Roster ==
2014 Corpus Christi Fury roster
Quarterbacks: 12 Robert Kent; Running backs: -- Johnathan Lugo; Wide receivers: 2 Schuyler Anderson; 6 Nathaniel Dunn; 12 John Moreno; -- Kenyada Tatum	Offensive linemen: -- Brandon Evans; Defensive linemen: currently vacant	Linebackers: -- DeAndrae Fillmore; 10 Leo Harris; Defensive backs: -- Reuben Flowers; Kickers: currently vacant	Injury Reserve: currently vacant; Exempt List: currently vacant; Transfer List: currently vacant; rookies in italics Roster updated May 24, 2013; 1 Active, 0 Inactive → More rosters
