= 2014 Florida Tarpons season =

- Owner: Michael Taylor
- General manager: Michael Taylor
- Head coach: Michael Taylor
- Home stadium: Germain Arena; 11000 Everblades Parkway; Estero, FL 33928

Results
- Record: 1-4
- League place: 3rd
- Playoffs: Lost Ultimate Bowl IV 23-60 (Fury)

The 2014 Florida Tarpons season was the third season for the franchise as a member of the Ultimate Indoor Football League (UIFL).

== Schedule ==
Key: Win Tie Loss Bye

=== Regular season ===
All start times are local to home team

Week	Day	Date	Opponent	Results		Location
Week	Day	Date	Opponent	Score	Record	Location
1	Sunday	May 18	Miami Inferno	L 35-58	0-1	Germain Arena
2	Sunday	May 25	Corpus Christi Fury	L 38-68	0-2	Germain Arena
3	Saturday	June 7	at Miami Inferno	Cancelled	0-2	BankUnited Center
4	Sunday	June 15	Missouri Voodoo	W 79-14	1-2	Germain Arena
5	Saturday	June 21	at Corpus Christi Fury	L 62-80	1-3	American Bank Center
6	Saturday	June 28	at Miami Inferno	Cancelled	1-3	BankUnited Center
7	Saturday	July 5	Miami Inferno	L 48-50	1-4	Germain Arena
8	Saturday	July 12	at Missouri Voodoo	Cancelled	1-4	Mediacom Ice Park
9	BYE					

=== Postseason ===
Round	Day	Date	Opponent	Results		Location
Round	Day	Date	Opponent	Score	Record	Location
Ultimate Bowl IV	Saturday	August 2	at Corpus Christi Fury	L 23-60	0-1	American Bank Center

== Standings ==
2014 UIFL standings
Team	W	L	PCT	PF	PA	STK
y-Corpus Christi Fury	5	0	1.000	311	183	W5
Miami Inferno	4	1	.800	284	139	W2
x-Florida Tarpons	1	4	.200	262	270	L2
Missouri Voodoo	0	5	.000	78	343	L5

y - clinched conference title x - clinched playoff spot

== Roster ==
2014 Florida Tarpons roster
Quarterbacks: -- Andrew Hall; -- Brian Harris; Running backs: -- Wesley Savuae; Wide receivers: -- Chris McKinney; -- Tristan Purifoy; -- Danny Young; -- Josh Young	Offensive linemen: currently vacant; Defensive linemen: currently vacant	Linebackers: currently vacant; Defensive backs: currently vacant; Kickers: 12 Rey Hernandez	Injury Reserve: currently vacant; Exempt List: currently vacant; Transfer List: currently vacant; rookies in italics Roster updated August 2, 2014; 8 Active, 0 Inactive → More rosters
