= LaRoi Johnson =

American football player (born 1985)

No. 75
- Position: Tight end

Personal information
- Born: January 7, 1985 (age 41); Pittsburgh, Pennsylvania, U.S.
- Listed height: 6 ft 3 in (1.91 m)
- Listed weight: 300 lb (136 kg)

Career information
- High school: Peabody (Pittsburgh)
- College: Malone
- NFL draft: 2008: undrafted

Career history
- Canton Legends (2008); Rock River Raptors (2008); Marion Mayhem (2009); San Angelo Stampede Express (2010); Fort Wayne FireHawks (2010); Utah Blaze* (2011); Huntington Hammer (2011); Harrisburg Stampede* (2011); Erie Explosion* (2012); Western Pennsylvania Sting (2012); Abilene Bombers (2013)*; York Capitals (2013); Marion Blue Racers (2013); Cape Fear Heroes (2014); Erie Explosion (2015)
- * Offseason or practice squad member only

Awards and highlights
- 1st Team All-MSFA (2007); AIF Champion (2014)
- Stats at ArenaFan.com

LaRoi Johnson (born January 7, 1985) is an American former professional football tight end. Johnson played college football at Malone University, where he was named All-Mid-States Football Association First Team in 2007.

== Early life ==
Johnson attended Peabody High School in Pittsburgh, Pennsylvania, where he was a member of the football team.

College recruiting
Name	Hometown	School	Height	Weight	40^{‡}	Commit date
LaRoi Johnson; TE	Pittsburgh, Pennsylvania	Peabody High School	6 ft 4 in (1.93 m)	258 lb (117 kg)	4.9	
LaRoi Johnson; TE	Recruit ratings: Scout: Rivals:					
Overall recruit ranking: Rivals: NR (TE), NR (PA)
Note: In many cases, Scout, Rivals, 247Sports, On3, and ESPN may conflict in their listings of height and weight.; In these cases, the average was taken. ESPN grades are on a 100-point scale.; Sources: "2003 Team Ranking". Rivals.com.

== College career ==
Johnson committed to play at California University of Pennsylvania after high school. He played at California for 2 seasons, before transferring to Malone University. As a senior in 2007, Johnson was named 1st Team All-Mid-States Football Association as a tight end.

=== Statistics ===
		Receiving						
Season	Team	GS	GP	Rec	Yds	Avg	TD	Long
2004	California (PA)	0	8	4	101	25.2	2	53
2005	California (PA)	0	6	0	0	--	0	--
2006	Malone	11	11	40	305	7.6	1	??
2007	Malone	12	12	39	417	10.7	1	??
	Totals	23	37	83	823	9.9	4	53

== Professional career ==
=== Pre-draft ===
Prior to the 2008 NFL draft, Johnson was projected to be undrafted by NFLDraftScout.com. He was rated as the 47th-best tight end in the draft.

=== Indoor/Arena career ===
He has played, or signed with the Tulsa Talons, Kentucky Horsemen, Marion Mayhem, Canton Legends, Rock River Raptors, San Angelo Stampede Express, Utah Blaze, Huntington Hammer, Harrisburg Stampede, Erie Explosion, Abilene Bombers, Cape Fear Heroes, Marion Blue Racers,

In 2011, LaRoi Johnson Posted 45 receptions for 450 yards and 9 touchdowns.

In October 2012, Johnson signed with the Abilene Bombers in the Lone Star Football League (LSFL).

In March 2014, Johnson signed with the Cape Fear Heroes in the American Indoor Football League ( AIF). https://web.archive.org/web/20140614115655/http://aifprofootball.com/transaction-logs.html

In 2014, Johnson signed with the Erie Explosion for the 2015 season.

In 2015 Johnson retired from playing Arena/Indoor football.
