= 2012 Johnstown Generals season =

- Owner: Jeff Bollinger
- Head coach: Quenteen Robinson
- Home stadium: Cambria County War Memorial Arena; 326 Napoleon Street; Johnstown, Pennsylvania 15901

Results
- Record: 3-6
- Conference place: 4th
- Playoffs: Did not qualify

The 2012 Johnstown Generals season was the second season for the Ultimate Indoor Football League (UIFL) franchise.

On May 15, 2012, the Generals were suspended by the league due to a lack of funds. The Generals were able to finish the season with a 2–6 record, and failed to qualify for the playoffs.

== Schedule ==
Key: Win Tie Loss Bye

=== Regular season ===
Week	Day	Date	Opponent	Results		Location
Week	Day	Date	Opponent	Score	Record	Location
1	Sunday	March 3	at Cincinnati Commandos	L 28-49	0-1	Cincinnati Gardens
2	Sunday	March 11	Erie Explosion	W 39-37	1-1	Cambria County War Memorial Arena
3	BYE					
4	Saturday	March 24	at Marion Blue Racers	L 19-41	1-2	Veterans Memorial Coliseum
5	Friday	March 30	Western Pennsylvania Sting	W 46-30	2-2	Cambria County War Memorial Arena
6	Saturday	April 7	Marion Blue Racers	L 23-56	2-3	Cambria County War Memorial Arena
7	Friday	April 13	at Erie Explosion	L 27-60	2-4	Louis J. Tullio Arena
8	BYE					
9	Sunday	April 29	at Erie Explosion	L 14-74	2-5	Louis J. Tullio Arena
10	Saturday	May 5	Western Pennsylvania Sting	Cancelled	2-5	Cambria County War Memorial Arena
11	Saturday	May 12	Huntington Wildcatz	Cancelled	2-5	Cambria County War Memorial Arena
12	BYE					
13	Saturday	May 26	Western Pennsylvania Sting	W 33-6	3-5	Cambria County War Memorial Arena
14	Saturday	June 2	Erie Explosion	L 35-88	3-6	Cambria County War Memorial Arena
15	BYE					

== Standings ==
2012 United Indoor Football League
Team	Conference			Overall				
Team	W	L	PCT	W	L	PCT	PF	PA
Northern Conference
Cincinnati Commandos-y	7	2	.778	8	2	.800	594	373
Erie Explosion-x	7	3	.700	8	3	.727	748	362
Marion Blue Racers-x	5	4	.556	6	5	.636	602	467
Johnstown Generals	3	6	.333	3	6	.333	264	441
Western Pennsylvania Sting	0	6	.000	0	7	.000	132	497
Southern Conference
Florida Tarpons-y	11	0	1.000	11	0	1.000	687	287
Eastern Kentucky Drillers	5	4	.556	6	4	.600	613	361
Lakeland Raiders-x	5	5	.500	6	5	.545	639	379
Rome Rampage	1	6	.143	1	6	.143	100	462
Mississippi Hound Dogs	1	9	.100	1	9	.100	281	559

== Final roster ==
2012 Johnstown Generals roster
Quarterbacks: 2 Andre Coles; Running backs: 32 Terrell Simms; Wide receivers: 88 Antione Bagwell; 81 Anthony Celliti; 15 Jason Goode; 44 Abrille Taylor; 13 Xavier Thomas	Offensive linemen: 93 Shaquan Madison; 50 Vicent Palmiere; Defensive linemen: 10 Kevin Dix; 77 Alex Hartsell; 5 William Hasse; 99 Tim McGee; 19 Victor Sesay	Linebackers: 16 Aaron Princes; 40 Lamont Stephens; Defensive backs: 1 Reggie Farrior; -- Garrett Heron; 8 Josh Simmons; 3 Matt Speed; 12 Calvin Stephens; Kickers: 7 Matt Domonkos	Injured reserve: Currently vacant; Exempt list: Currently vacant; Practice squad: Currently vacant; Rookies in italics Roster updated March 29, 2011; 22 Active, 3 Inactive, 0 PS
