= 2012 Eastern Kentucky Drillers season =

- Owner: Rick Kranz
- General manager: Rick Kranz
- Head coach: Rick Kranz
- Home stadium: Eastern Kentucky Expo Center; 126 Main Street; Pikeville, KY 41501

Results
- Record: 6–4
- Conference place: 2nd
- Playoffs: Self imposed suspension

The 2012 Eastern Kentucky Drillers season was the 2nd season for the United Indoor Football League franchise. The Drillers were able to finish the season with a 6–4 record, but suspended themselves from the playoffs for violating league rules.

== Schedule ==
Key: Win Tie Loss Bye

=== Regular season ===
All start times are local to home team

Week	Day	Date	Opponent	Results		Location
Week	Day	Date	Opponent	Score	Record	Location
1	Saturday	March 3	at Marion Blue Racers	L 34–48	0–1	Veterans Memorial Coliseum
2	Friday	March 9	Cincinnati Commandos	L 51–64	0–2	Eastern Kentucky Expo Center
3	Sunday	March 18	Marion Blue Racers	W 61–47	1–2	Eastern Kentucky Expo Center
4	BYE					
5	Sunday	April 1	at Erie Explosion	L 38–58	1–3	Erie Insurance Arena
6	BYE					
7	Sunday	April 15	Rome Rampage	W 82–20	2–3	Eastern Kentucky Expo Center
8	Saturday	April 21	at Mississippi Hound Dogs	W 60–25	3–3	BancorpSouth Arena
9	Sunday	April 29	Western Pennsylvania Sting	W 105–8	4–3	Eastern Kentucky Expo Center
10	BYE					
11	BYE					
12	Monday	May 21	Lakeland Raiders	W 36–20	5–3	Eastern Kentucky Expo Center
13	Saturday	May 26	at Lakeland Raiders	L 44–51	5–4	Lakeland Center
14	Saturday	June 2	Mississippi Hound Dogs	W 88–16	6–4	Eastern Kentucky Expo Center
15	Saturday	June 9	Chattanooga Valley Vipers	W 89–14	7–4	Eastern Kentucky Expo Center

== Standings ==
2012 United Indoor Football League
Team	Conference			Overall				
Team	W	L	PCT	W	L	PCT	PF	PA
Northern Conference
Cincinnati Commandos-y	7	2	.778	8	2	.800	594	373
Erie Explosion-x	7	3	.700	8	3	.727	748	362
Marion Blue Racers-x	5	4	.556	6	5	.636	602	467
Johnstown Generals	3	6	.333	3	6	.333	264	441
Western Pennsylvania Sting	0	6	.000	0	7	.000	132	497
Southern Conference
Florida Tarpons-y	11	0	1.000	11	0	1.000	687	287
Eastern Kentucky Drillers	5	4	.556	6	4	.600	613	361
Lakeland Raiders-x	5	5	.500	6	5	.545	639	379
Rome Rampage	1	6	.143	1	6	.143	100	462
Mississippi Hound Dogs	1	9	.100	1	9	.100	281	559

y – clinched conference title x – clinched playoff spot

== Roster ==
2012 Eastern Kentucky Drillers roster
Quarterbacks: 2 Allan Holland; Running backs: -- Maurice Douse; Wide receivers: 11 Aric Evans; 18 Lynell Suggs	Offensive linemen: 69 Phil Blaising; 70 Josh Gipson; 55 Joe Parker; Defensive linemen: 98 Jeremiah Fennell; 32 Shawn Lewis; 99 Ellery Moore; 44 Jamar Porter	Linebackers: 1 Anson Cunningham; 8 Andre Hatchett; Defensive backs: 21 Miquel Carodine; 4 George Jackson; 7 David Jones; Kickers: 5 Daniel Eidson	Injured Reserve: currently vacant; Exempt List: currently vacant; Practice squad: currently vacant; rookies in italics; Roster updated June 9, 2012; 17 Active, 0 Inactive, 0 PS
