= 2012 Erie Explosion season =

- Owner: Bill Stafford
- General manager: Shawn Liotta
- Head coach: Shawn Liotta
- Home stadium: Louis J. Tullio Arena; 809 French Street; Erie, Pennsylvania 16501

Results
- Record: 8–3
- Conference place: 2nd
- Playoffs: Lost Northern Championship Game 40–62 (Commandos)

The 2012 Erie Explosion season was the sixth season for the indoor American football franchise, and their first as a member of the Northern Conference of the United Indoor Football League (UIFL).

On August 25, 2011, the Explosion left the Southern Indoor Football League (SIFL) and joined the United Indoor Football League. The change reunited Erie with Andrew Haines, who founded the city's previous indoor football team, the Erie Freeze. (The Explosion's departure came two weeks before the SIFL broke up into the Lone Star Football League and the Professional Indoor Football League, neither of which included Pennsylvania in their territories.) Erie was tasked with replacing MVP quarterback DiMichele, who had signed with the Arena Football League's Philadelphia Soul. The job fell on the shoulders of rookie Colton Hansen. In the second game of the season, Hansen struggled in a loss to the Johnstown Generals, and he was replaced by A. J. McKenna. McKenna lead the Explosion to 8–3 regular season record, just losing the top seed in the UIFL North during the last game of the season. While still securing a home playoff game, the Tullio Arena had begun a 45 million dollar renovation, that forced the Explosion to find a new place to host the game. The Explosion announced that they would play at Erie Cathedral Prep's Dollinger Field. The Explosion trailed going into the fourth quarter against the Marion Blue Racers, but McKenna ignited the Erie offense to 22 points in the final stanza to advance to the UIFL North Conference final.

The Explosion faced the Cincinnati Commandos, who had only lost 2 games all season, one of which was to Erie. With the Commando quarterback Tyler Sheehan out with an injury, the Commandos used Kynes Mincy at quarterback, who provided a duel-threat option. Mincy lead the Commandos to 8 scores, defeating the Explosion 62–40 to advance to the Ultimate Bowl.

== Schedule ==
Key: Win Tie Loss Bye

=== Regular season ===
Week	Day	Date	Opponent	Results		Location
Week	Day	Date	Opponent	Score	Record	Location
1	Friday	March 1	Western Pennsylvania Sting	W 81–7	1–0	Louis J. Tullio Arena
2	Sunday	March 11	at Johnstown Generals	L 37–39	1–1	Cambria County War Memorial Arena
3	BYE					
4	Friday	March 23	Western Pennsylvania Sting	W 88–34	2–1	Louis J. Tullio Arena
5	Monday	April 1	Eastern Kentucky Drillers	W 58–38	3–1	Louis J. Tullio Arena
6	BYE					
7	Friday	April 13	Johnstown Generals	W 60–27	4–1	Louis J. Tullio Arena
8	Sunday	April 22	Cincinnati Commandos	L 34–55	4–2	Louis J. Tullio Arena
9	Sunday	April 29	Johnstown Generals	W 74–14	5–2	Louis J. Tullio Arena
10	Sunday	May 6	Huntington Wildcatz	W 102–30	6–2	Louis J. Tullio Arena
11	BYE					
12	BYE					
13	Saturday	May 26	at Cincinnati Commandos	W 62–18	7–2	Cincinnati Gardens
14	Saturday	June 2	at Johnstown Generals	W 88–35	8–2	Cambria County War Memorial Arena
15	Saturday	June 9	at Marion Blue Racers	L 64–65 (OT)	8–3	Veterans Memorial Coliseum

=== Postseason ===
Round	Day	Date	Opponent	Results		Location
Round	Day	Date	Opponent	Score	Record	Location
Northern Semifinals	Saturday	June 16	Marion Blue Racers	W 56–47	1–0	Cathedral Preparatory School
Northern Championship	Saturday	June 23	at Cincinnati Commandos	L 40–62	1–1	Cathedral Preparatory School

== Standings ==
2012 United Indoor Football League
Team	Conference			Overall				
Team	W	L	PCT	W	L	PCT	PF	PA
Northern Conference
Cincinnati Commandos-y	7	2	.778	8	2	.800	594	373
Erie Explosion-x	7	3	.700	8	3	.727	748	362
Marion Blue Racers-x	5	4	.556	6	5	.636	602	467
Johnstown Generals	3	6	.333	3	6	.333	264	441
Western Pennsylvania Sting	0	6	.000	0	7	.000	132	497
Southern Conference
Florida Tarpons-y	11	0	1.000	11	0	1.000	687	287
Eastern Kentucky Drillers	5	4	.556	6	4	.600	613	361
Lakeland Raiders-x	5	5	.500	6	5	.545	639	379
Rome Rampage	1	6	.143	1	6	.143	100	462
Mississippi Hound Dogs	1	9	.100	1	9	.100	281	559

== Roster ==
2012 Erie Explosion roster
Quarterbacks: 7 A. J. McKenna; Running backs: 99 Bob Hammer; Wide receivers: 1 A. J. Harris; 85 Willie Idlette; 8 Terry Jackson; 6 Andre London; 5 Tirone Morris	Offensive linemen: 62 Joe Blanks; 55 Bob McQuiston; Defensive linemen: 9 Andre Portis; 4 Michael Robinson; 12 Zach Williams	Linebackers: 2 Roosevelt Benjamin; 24 Jon D'Angelo; -- Jamaal Stokes; Defensive backs: 20 Quintarrius Brooks; 21 A. J. Saunders; 3 Enrique Shaw; Kickers: 11 Shon Rowser	Injured Reserve: currently vacant; Exempt List: 10 Colton Hansen QB; Practice squad: currently vacant; rookies in italics; Roster updated February 19, 2013; 19 Active, 1 Inactive, 0 PS

== Coaching staff ==
2012 Erie Explosion staff
Front office: Director of operations – Bill Stafford; Marketing – Sarah Lander; Director of sales – Shawn Struble; Head coach: Head coach – Shawn Liotta; Offensive coaches: Offensive coordinator – Shawn Liotta; Director of player personnel – Jeremy Liotta	Defensive coaches: Defensive coordinator – Kirk Rearick; Defensive backs – Sam Reynolds; Special teams coaches: Special teams coordinator – Ed Martin
