= Trey Kramer =

American football player (born 1988)

Profile
- Position: Placekicker

Personal information
- Born: January 21, 1988 (age 38); Versailles, Kentucky
- Listed height: 6 ft 2 in (1.88 m)
- Listed weight: 195 lb (88 kg)

Career information
- High school: Woodford County High School
- College: Transylvania
- NFL draft: 2010: undrafted

Career history
- Marion Blue Racers (2012); Pittsburgh Power (2012)

Awards and highlights
- Honorable Mention All-UIFL North (2012)

Career AFL statistics
- FG Made: 0
- FG Attempts: 0
- PAT Made: 4
- PAT Attempts: 8
- Tackles: 3
- Stats at ArenaFan.com

Raymond "Trey" Kramer is an American former football placekicker.

Kramer attended Woodford County High School, in Versailles, Kentucky, where he was a member of the soccer team. After his senior season, he moved on to Transylvania University where he didn't play his freshman year. In 2007 Kramer became the starting goalkeeper for the Pioneers. Kramer went on to start for three outstanding seasons at Transylvania, being named to 3 All-HCAC teams, and once a National Soccer Coaches Association of America's Adidas All-Great Lakes Region player.

After a great collegiate career, Kramer played professionally with Puntarenas F.C. and the Louisville Lightning. Upon filming himself making 68 yard field goals, and placing the videos on Youtube.com, Kramer signed to play football with the Marion Blue Racers. After playing well with the Blue Racers, he was assigned to the Pittsburgh Power then to Winnipeg Blue Bombers in 2013 of the Canadian Football League.

== Early life ==
Kramer was born the son of Stan and Evelyn Kramer in Versailles, Kentucky. Kramer attended Woodford County High School in Versailles, where he was a standout soccer player as a goalkeeper.

== College career ==
=== Transylvania University ===
Kramer attended Transylvania University, in Lexington, Kentucky, where he played as a member of the soccer team. As a sophomore, Kramer led the Heartland Collegiate Athletic Conference in shutouts (7), save percentage (.870), and goals against average (0.44) on his way to being named First Team All-HCAC. As a senior for the Pioneers, Kramer posted nine shutouts this season and sported a 0.56 goals against average, on his way to being named First Team All-HCAC as well as to the National Soccer Coaches Association of America's Adidas All-Great Lakes Region team. Kramer was also named the Transylvania University's Male Athlete of the Year as a senior.

== Professional career ==
=== Soccer ===
==== Louisville Lightning ====
After Graduation, Kramer signed with the Louisville Lightning of the Professional Arena Soccer League.

==== Puntarenas F.C. ====
In 2011, Kramer played for Puntarenas F.C. of the Costa Rican Primera División.

=== Football ===
==== Marion Blue Racers ====
In 2012, Kramer signed to play with the Marion Blue Racers of the United Indoor Football League. Kramer never having played a down of football before, was named the starting kicker for the Blue Racers. After just 6 games of the regular season, Kramer had already won the UIFL's Special Teams Player of the Week Award twice.

==== Pittsburgh Power ====
On May 3, 2012, Kramer was assigned to the Pittsburgh Power of the Arena Football League. Kramer appeared in just one game with the Power, not attempting any Field Goals, and going 4 for 8 in PAT attempts. He was reassigned on May 7, 2012.

==== Return to Marion Blue Racers ====
Upon his reassignment, Kramer re-signed with the Blue Racers. He was twice more named the UIFL North Special Teams Player of the Week, and finished the season 7 for 18 on Field Goals and 47 for 58 on PATs. As a result of his season, Kramer was named Honorable Mention All-UIFL North.

==== NFL Regional Combine ====
Selected to kick at the 2013 NFL Regional Combine in Los Angeles, CA February 8, 2013. Kramer put up three consistently long directional kick offs and connected on all 5 field goals. Kramer was tested from 35 yards Left, 40 yards Right, 45 yards Left, 50 yards Right and 55 yards Left. Kramer since then has been invited to kick at the Dallas Cowboy's Stadium in Dallas, TX at the NFL Super Regional Combine on March 8. All 32 NFL teams in attendance.

==== Winnipeg Blue Bombers ====
Kramer signed to training camp with the Winnipeg Blue Bombers of the Canadian Football League in 2013.
