= Jim Brandon =

Jim Brandon may refer to:

- Jim Brandon Equestrian Centre
- Jim Brandon (basketball), coach for Glasgow Rocks
- Jim Brandon, who worked with James Shelby Downard
- Jim Brandon (actor) in Dorm Life
- Jimmy Brandon of Waikiki (band)

== See also ==
- James Brandon (disambiguation)
