= Mississippi Hound Dogs =

Logo

General information
- Founded: 2011
- Folded: 2012
- Headquartered: Tupelo, Mississippi at the BancorpSouth Arena
- Colors: Blue Suede, Sky Blue, Cream

Personnel
- Owner: UIFL
- Head coach: Martino Theus

Team history
- Mississippi Hound Dogs (2012)

Home fields
- BancorpSouth Arena (2012)

League / conference affiliations
- Ultimate Indoor Football League (2012): Southern Conference (2012)

The Mississippi Hound Dogs were a professional indoor football team based in Tupelo, Mississippi. The Hound Dogs played their home games at the BancorpSouth Arena as a member of the Ultimate Indoor Football League's Southern Conference.

The Hound Dogs name is an homage to Tupelo's best-known native, the "King of Rock 'n Roll" Elvis Presley, in particular his cover version of "Hound Dog", which became that song's best-known version and one of Presley's best-known recordings in general. (They are the second football team to use the name in homage to Presley; the first, the Memphis Hound Dogs, was a proposed NFL expansion team that was not accepted to the league upon its expansion in 1995.)

The Hound Dogs were the third indoor football team to play in Tupelo, after the Tupelo FireAnts of the National Indoor Football League (2001–2004) and the Mississippi MudCats of the American Indoor Football Association (2007).

== Franchise history ==
On August 16, 2011 the team announced that Martino Theus would be the team's first ever head coach. On March 20, 2012, head coach Martino Theus was fired after an 0-3 start for the Hound Dogs. Former indoor player, Eric Bingham was hired as his replacement. However, when the UIFL stepped in when owner Marty Cooper couldn't afford the team, the UIFL took over the team and named Martino Theus the head coach once again. The Hound Dogs cancelled all remaining home games, but fulfilled all their remaining road games.

On April 24, 2012, the league announced that it had taken over operations of the Mississippi Hound Dogs due to financial difficulty, and modified their schedule to make them a travel-only squad.

There were several changes to the schedule made when the league took over operations of the Hound Dogs. The May 14 game against the Western Pennsylvania Sting was cancelled, and the May 26 game against the Florida Tarpons was originally scheduled to be a home game, but the schedule was changed to play the game in Florida.

== Final roster ==
2012 Mississippi Hound Dogs roster
Quarterbacks: -- Jeremy Dixon; -- Michael Leadbetter; -- Richard McFadden; Running backs: currently vacant; Wide receivers: -- Reggie Ellis; -- Roderick Jefferson; -- Taurean Rhetta; -- Jeremy Satchel; -- Sperguron	Offensive linemen: -- Desmoine Ware; Defensive linemen: -- Sterling Williams	Linebackers: -- Brandon Bruce; 14 Devon Lewis; Defensive backs: -- Cordney Sanders; -- Corey Sanders]; -- Arthur Williams; Kickers: -- Tyler Lorenz	Injured Reserve: -- Josh Smith WR; Exempt List: currently vacant; Practice squad: currently vacant; rookies in italics; Roster updated October 4, 2011; 16 Active, 1 Inactive, 0 PS

== Head coaches ==
Name	Term	Regular season				Playoffs		Awards
Name	Term	W	L	T	Win%	W	L	Awards
Martino Theus	2012	0	6	0	.000	0	0	
Eric Bingham	2012	1	3	0	.250	0	0	

== Season-by-season results ==
League champions	Conference champions	Division champions	Wild card berth	League leader

Season	Team	League	Conference	Division	Regular season				Postseason results
Season	Team	League	Conference	Division	Finish	Wins	Losses	Ties	Postseason results
2012	2012	UIFL	Southern		5th	1	9	0	
Totals						1	9	0	All-time regular season record (2012)
Totals						0	0	-	All-time postseason record (2012)
Totals						1	9	0	All-time regular season and postseason record (2012)
