= 2014 UIFL season =

- League: Ultimate Indoor Football League
- Sport: Indoor Football
- Duration: February 18, 2011 – June 9, 2011

Regular season
- Season champions: Corpus Christi Fury

Ultimate Bowl IV
- Champions: Corpus Christi Fury
- Runners-up: Florida Tarpons
- Finals MVP: Rueben Flowers (CC)

UIFL seasons
- ← 2013

The 2014 UIFL season was the fourth and what would be the final season for the Ultimate Indoor Football League (UIFL). The league went to 4 teams to start the season Corpus Christi Fury, Florida Tarpons, Missouri Voodoo and Miami Inferno. On July 12, 2014, it was announced that the Miami Inferno were suspended for the remainder of the 2014 season and all games would be forfeited. It was also announced that Ultimate Bowl IV would be played on August 2, 2014. The game featured Corpus Christi Fury vs. Florida Tarpons, with the Fury winning 60–23.

== Standings ==
2014 UIFL standings
Team	W	L	PCT	PF	PA	STK
y-Corpus Christi Fury	5	0	1.000	311	183	W5
Miami Inferno	4	1	.800	284	139	W2
x-Florida Tarpons	1	4	.200	262	270	L2
Missouri Voodoo	0	5	.000	78	343	L5

y - clinched league regular-season title
x - clinched playoff spot
