= Palm Beach Waves =

Logo

General information
- Founded: 2006
- Folded: 2007
- Headquartered: West Palm Beach, Florida at the Jim Brandon Equestrian Center
- Colors: Aqua, Orange, Lime Green

Team history
- Palm Beach Waves (2007)

Home fields
- Jim Brandon Equestrian Center (2007)

League / conference affiliations
- National Indoor Football League (2007)

The Palm Beach Waves were an indoor football team. They were a 2007 expansion member National Indoor Football League. They played their home games at the Jim Brandon Equestrian Center in West Palm Beach, Florida. This is the second attempt of an NIFL team in West Palm Beach after the 2006 failure of the West Palm Beach Phantoms. NIFL Florida Division was suspended in early 2007.

== Season-By-Season ==
Season records
Season	W	L	T	Finish	Playoff results
2007	1	2	0	4th Atlantic Florida	--
