= James Brandon =

James Brandon may refer to:

- James Brandon (footballer) (1867–1934), Scottish footballer
- James Brandon (journalist), British journalist
- James Brandon (colonel) (1734–1790), colonel in the North Carolina militia during the American Revolution
- James Brandon, character in All for Peggy
- James Brandon, stand-up comedian, member of The Grumbleweeds
- James Rodger Brandon (1927–2015), American professor of Asian theater at the University of Hawaii
- Jamie Brandon (born 1998), Scottish footballer (Heart of Midlothian FC)

== See also ==
- Jim Brandon (disambiguation)
- Brandon James (born 1987), American football player
