= Miami Inferno =

Defunct professional indoor football team

Logo

General information
- Founded: 2013
- Folded: 2014
- Headquartered: Coral Gables, Florida at the BankUnited Center
- Colors: Navy, Orange, White
- Mascot: Torch

Personnel
- Owners: Chad Dittman; Amber Dittman
- General manager: Harold Cole
- Head coach: Pete Taylor

Team history
- Miami Inferno (2014)

Home fields
- BankUnited Center (2014)

League / conference affiliations
- Ultimate Indoor Football League (2014)

The Miami Inferno was a professional indoor football team which was a member of the Ultimate Indoor Football League (UIFL) in 2014. Based in Coral Gables, Florida, the Inferno played some of their home games at the BankUnited Center on the campus of the University of Miami. They were the latest indoor/arena football team to play in the Miami area after the Miami Hooters Florida Bobcats of the Arena Football League, who played from 1993 to 2001. Cade Kretuer, son of Chad Kreuter was made back up QB prior to the start of the 2014 season. The Inferno were owned by Chad and Amber Dittman. The UIFL suspended the Miami Inferno on July 12, 2014. Despite having the second best record in the league, the Inferno did not have enough players to finish their remaining games. All remaining games of the 2014 season were forfeited.

== Schedule ==
Key: Win Tie Loss Bye All start times are local to home team

Week	Day	Date	Opponent	Results		Location
Week	Day	Date	Opponent	Score	Record	Location
1	Sunday	May 18	at Florida Tarpons	W 58–35	1–0	Germain Arena
2	Sunday	May 25	Missouri Voodoo	W 69–8	2–0	BankUnited Center
3	Saturday	June 7	Florida Tarpons	Cancelled	2–0	BankUnited Center
4	Sunday	June 15	Corpus Christi Fury	L 33–42	2–1	BankUnited Center
5	Saturday	June 21	at Missouri Voodoo	W 74–6	3–1	Mediacom Ice Park
6	Saturday	June 28	Florida Tarpons	Cancelled	3–1	BankUnited Center
7	Saturday	July 5	at Florida Tarpons	W 50–48	4–1	Germain Arena
8	Saturday	July 12	at Corpus Christi Fury	Cancelled	4–1	American Bank Center
9	BYE					

== Standings ==
2014 UIFL standings
Team	W	L	PCT	PF	PA	STK
y-Corpus Christi Fury	5	0	1.000	311	183	W5
Miami Inferno	4	1	.800	284	139	W2
x-Florida Tarpons	1	4	.200	262	270	L2
Missouri Voodoo	0	5	.000	78	343	L5

y – clinched conference title x – clinched playoff spot

== Roster ==
2014 Miami Inferno roster
Quarterbacks: -- Melvin Robinson; -- Tavares Woodley; Running backs: -- Travis Glasford; Wide receivers: -- Joel Lemons; -- Darius Passmore; 2 JeVaughn Reams; -- Keiran Ward	Offensive linemen: -- Jabari Ferguson; Defensive linemen: -- Renaud Dieujuste	Linebackers: -- Gerrod Bodie; -- Raul Garrao; -- Jack White; Defensive backs: currently vacant; Kickers: -- Eric Perri	Injury Reserve: currently vacant; Exempt List: currently vacant; Transfer List: currently vacant; rookies in italics Roster updated August 2, 2014; 13 Active, 0 Inactive
