= Miami Sting =

- Founded: 2011
- Folded: 2013
- League: UIFL 2012
- Team history: Western Pennsylvania Sting (2012); Miami Sting (2013)
- Based in: Coral Gables, Florida (2013)
- Arena: BankUnited Center (2013)
- Colors: Red & Black
- Owner: TBA
- President: TBA
- Head coach: Keith Evans
- Championships: (0)
- Conference titles: (0)
- Playoff berths: (0)
- Dancers: The Honeybees

The Miami Sting were a professional indoor football team based in Coral Gables, Florida. The Sting was to play its home games at the BankUnited Center on the campus of the University of Miami in Coral Gables. The Sting folded just before the 2013 season began.

The Sting were the fourth indoor/arena football team to call South Florida home, following the Miami Hooters of the Arena Football League (1993-1995), their relocated form the Florida Bobcats (1996-2001), the Miami Morays of the National Indoor Football League (2005 National Indoor Football League season), and their relocated form the Florida Frenzy (2006), and the Miami Vice Squad (which only played a portion of the 2007 NIFL season before they were suspended and the league folded).

== Franchise history ==
=== 2012 ===
Western Pennsylvania Sting Logo

The Sting were originally created to replace the Saginaw Sting, who had left the league to re-join the Continental Indoor Football League (CIFL). The Sting had an agreement to host games at Cambria County War Memorial Arena in Johnstown, Pennsylvania, as well as other cities throughout Western Pennsylvania. On November 30, 2011, they announced that they would be coached by Paul Pennington.

Pennington, his staff, and all signed players resigned after the sale of the team to Jeff Bollinger a Pittsburgh Businessman, after which the Sting were coached by Bollinger, Jeff Hether and Bill Miller during the 2012 season.

The Sting finished their inaugural season with an 0–7 record, last place in the Northern Conference.

=== 2013 ===
The franchise moved to Coral Gables, Florida for the 2013 season, to be known as the Miami Sting. The Sting will play their home games at the BankUnited Center, on the campus of the University of Miami. The franchise named former head coach of the Ontario Warriors, Keith Evans, as their head coach in October 2012.

== Roster ==
Miami Sting roster
Quarterbacks: -- Anthony Andre; Running backs: -- Chris Pointdexter; Wide receivers: -- Stefon Ceaser; -- Phillip Goodman; -- Solomon Jones; -- John Roberson; -- Timothy Smith	Offensive linemen: currently vacant; Defensive linemen: -- Christopher Dirksz; -- LaRonn Zimmerman	Linebackers: -- Andrew Gamboa; Defensive backs: -- Mikell Mair; Special teams: -- Joe Lindway	Reserve lists: currently vacant; rookies in italics; Roster updated October 29, 2012; 12 Active, 0 Inactive

== Coaches of note ==
=== Head coaches ===
Name	Term	Regular season				Playoffs		Awards
Name	Term	W	L	T	Win%	W	L	Awards
Jeff Bollinger	2012	0	7	0	.000	0	0	
Keith Evans	2013	0	0	0	–	0	0	

=== Coaching staff ===
Miami Sting staff
Front office: Founder/Owner/President – UIFL; Head coach: Head coach – Keith Evans; Offensive coaches: Offensive coordinator –	Defensive coaches: Defensive coordinator – Anthony Atkins

== Season-by-season results ==
League champions	Conference champions	Division champions	Wild card berth	League leader

Season	Team	League	Conference	Division	Regular season				Postseason results
Season	Team	League	Conference	Division	Finish	Wins	Losses	Ties	Postseason results
2012	2012	UIFL	Northern		5th	0	7	0	
Totals						0	7	0	All-time regular season record (2012)
Totals						0	0	-	All-time postseason record (2012)
Totals						0	7	0	All-time regular season and postseason record (2012)
