= Huntington Hammer =

US professional indoor football team

Logo

General information
- Founded: 2010
- Folded: 2012
- Headquartered: Huntington, West Virginia at the Big Sandy Superstore Arena
- Colors: Blue, Orange, and White
- Mascot: Thoran

Personnel
- Owners: Cecil Van Dyke; Bill Nichols; Rick Kranz; Daniel Fisher
- Head coach: Michael Owens

Team history
- Huntington Hammer (2011-2012) Sarasota Thunder (2013)

Home fields
- Big Sandy Superstore Arena (2010-2012)

League / conference affiliations
- Ultimate Indoor Football League (2011-2012)

Playoff appearances (1)
- 2011

The Huntington Hammer were a professional indoor football team that began play as a charter member of the Ultimate Indoor Football League (UIFL) for its inaugural 2011 season. The Hammer were based in Huntington, West Virginia, with home games played at the Big Sandy Superstore Arena.

The Hammer were the third indoor football team to play in Huntington, succeeding the National Indoor Football League's River Cities LocoMotives (2001) and the American Indoor Football Association's Huntington Heroes (2006–2008). A team called the West Virginia Wild was set to play in the Continental Indoor Football League for 2009, but the franchise was revoked prior to the team's inaugural season.

== History ==
=== 2011 ===
The team was owned by principal owner, Cecil Vandyke, along with co-owners Bill Nichols and Rick Kranz. On January 6, 2011, Josh Resignalo was named the first head coach in Hammer history. Resignalo was relieved on his coaching duties following an April 9 loss to the Saginaw Sting. Defensive coordinator, Michael Owens, was named the interim head coach. The Hammer experienced and up and down season, but managed to earn a 7–7 record, earning a playoff berth while winning the final game of the season. However, the Hammer experienced a season-low point total for the season, scoring just four points in a Semifinal matchup with the Eastern Kentucky Drillers.

=== 2012 ===
The Hammer were set to return to the UIFL in 2012, with the league expanding to 16 teams. However, before the season started, the UIFL announced that 6 of the 16 teams announced for 2012 would be folding, this included the Hammer.

== Notable players ==
See Category:Huntington Hammer players

=== All-League selections ===
- RB Dray Mason
- DL Michael Robinson
- DB Jaret Sanderson
- KR Dray Mason

== Head coaches ==
Name	Term	Regular season				Playoffs		Awards
Name	Term	W	L	T	Win%	W	L	Awards
Josh Resignalo	2011	4	3	0	.571	0	0	
Michael Owens	2011	3	4	0	.429	0	1	

== Season-by-season results ==
League champions	Conference champions	Division champions	Wild card berth	League leader

Season	Team	League	Conference	Division	Regular season				Postseason results
Season	Team	League	Conference	Division	Finish	Wins	Losses	Ties	Postseason results
2011	2011	UIFL			4th	7	7	0	Lost Semifinal 4–20 (Eastern Kentucky)
Totals						7	7	0	All-time regular season record (2011)
Totals						0	1	-	All-time postseason record (2011)
Totals						7	8	0	All-time regular season and postseason record (2011)
