= Palm Beach Phantoms =

General information
- Founded: 2006
- Folded: 2007
- Colors: Purple, black

Personnel
- Head coach: Ray Berger
- President: Michael Lind

Team history
- West Palm Beach Phantoms (2006); Palm Beach Phantoms (2012)

League / conference affiliations
- National Indoor Football League (2006)

The Palm Beach Phantoms were a professional indoor football team that were members of the National Indoor Football League in 2006. A new team with the same name played two replacement games for the Ultimate Indoor Football League in 2012.

== History ==
Formed in time for the 2006 season, the West Palm Beach Phantoms were scheduled to play their home games at the Delray Beach Tennis Center in Delray Beach, Florida, which would have made them the first indoor football team to play in an outdoor venue. After losing their first two road contests, however, the Phantoms' first home game, scheduled for April 8, 2006, was called off due to a contract dispute. While the team's ownership tried to work out a deal with the tennis center, the Phantoms were sent wandering around the league as a road-only team.

The Phantoms managed one win in their history: a 43–41 win over the Osceola Outlaws on May 13, 2006. But with no home field, the team finally had to cancel all of its home games, and much of the team quit. With hardly any quality players left on its roster, Palm Beach lost their final two games by embarrassing margins; first, 70–0 to the eventual league runner-up Fayetteville Guard, followed by an incredible 132-3 dismantling by the Katy Copperheads, marking the worst defeat in indoor/arena football history. Owner Michael Lind had seen enough, and the appropriately named Phantoms vanished, their final record 1–6.

A new indoor football team, the Palm Beach Waves, lasted just three games into the 2007 season before bailing out of the NIFL.

=== 2012 revival ===
In 2012, the Palm Beach Phantoms name was revived for a proposed franchise in the United Indoor Football League. The reborn Phantoms played two replacement games against UIFL opponents: the Florida Tarpons, in front of 4,993 fans at Germain Arena, and the Lakeland Raiders, in Lakeland. Unfortunately, the new Phantoms were no more successful than the old ones, losing 91–18 to Florida and 100–0 to Lakeland.

=== Outdoor and attempted relaunches ===
Since then, the Palm Beach Phantoms have played independently as a semi-professional team, often playing outdoors. Occasionally, they have been added as members of various startup leagues such as World Developmental Football League for 2015, Elite Indoor Football (a league set up by the Savannah Steam) for 2017, the Elite Indoor Football Conference (a separate league started by the Central Florida Jaguars) for 2017, and Arena Pro Football (a league briefly associated with the EIFC) for 2017.

Along with their attempts at joining various leagues in 2017, they were scheduled to play a home-and-home preseason series with the Savannah Coastal Outlaws of Arena Pro Football. The Phantoms were listing their home field as the Lakeland Center in the Lakeland, Florida (the home arena of the Central Florida Jaguars). However, the dates passed and no games were played with the Outlaws merely stating that they had been cancelled.
