= 2012 UIFL season =

- League: Ultimate Indoor Football League
- Sport: Indoor football
- Duration: February, 2012 – June, 2012

Regular season
- Season champions: Florida Tarpons
- North champions: Cincinnati Commandos
- North runners-up: Erie Explosion
- South champions: Florida Tarpons
- South runners-up: Lakeland Raiders

Ultimate Bowl II
- Champions: Cincinnati Commandos
- Runners-up: Florida Tarpons
- Finals MVP: Kyenes Mincy

UIFL seasons
- ← 2011 2013 →

The 2012 United Indoor Football League season was the second season of the league. The league was split into two conferences, and four divisions (two divisions in each conference).

On April 24, the league announced that it had taken over operations of the Mississippi Hound Dogs due to financial difficulty, and modified their schedule to make them a travel-only squad.

On May 14, The UIFL suspended the ownership of Johnstown, Western Pennsylvania The result of the Johnstown suspension leads to the cancellation of the June 2 contest with Erie, and sets the field for the North division. Cincinnati, Erie and Marion will spend the final four weeks of the season fighting for playoff seeding. The Palm Beach Phantoms a former NIFL team will replace the Sting for its two games in Florida. The Phantoms, who are currently participating in an eight-man outdoor league, are applying for inclusion for the 2013 UIFL season. Johnstown was reinstated on May 30, 2012

On June 11, the UIFL accepted self-imposed penalties of the Eastern Kentucky Drillers. As a reaction to several off-the-field incidents, at home and on the road, by some players, the Drillers are banning themselves from the 2012 season. The resulting ban moves Lakeland into the UIFL South division championship game on June 25 against Florida.

For this season only, the UIFL used the name "United Indoor Football League;" the more widely known (and unrelated) United Football League had suspended its operations during the 2012 offseason. Upon the UFL's resumption of operations in late summer 2012, the UIFL reverted to the "Ultimate Indoor Football League" name it had used in 2011.

== Standings ==
2012 United Indoor Football League
| Team | Conference | | | Overall | | | | |
| Team | W | L | PCT | W | L | PCT | PF | PA |
|---|---|---|---|---|---|---|---|---|
Northern Conference
| Cincinnati Commandos-y | 7 | 2 | .778 | 8 | 2 | .800 | 594 | 373 |
| Erie Explosion-x | 7 | 3 | .700 | 8 | 3 | .727 | 748 | 362 |
| Marion Blue Racers-x | 5 | 4 | .556 | 6 | 5 | .636 | 602 | 467 |
| Johnstown Generals | 3 | 6 | .333 | 3 | 6 | .333 | 264 | 441 |
| Western Pennsylvania Sting | 0 | 6 | .000 | 0 | 7 | .000 | 132 | 497 |
Southern Conference
| Florida Tarpons-y | 11 | 0 | 1.000 | 11 | 0 | 1.000 | 687 | 287 |
| Eastern Kentucky Drillers | 5 | 4 | .556 | 6 | 4 | .600 | 613 | 361 |
| Lakeland Raiders-x | 5 | 5 | .500 | 6 | 5 | .545 | 639 | 379 |
| Rome Rampage | 1 | 6 | .143 | 1 | 6 | .143 | 100 | 462 |
| Mississippi Hound Dogs | 1 | 9 | .100 | 1 | 9 | .100 | 281 | 559 |

y - clinched conference title x - clinched playoff spot

== 2012 Playoffs ==
The host for the Ultimate Bowl is determined by the following tiebreakers: overall record, head to head record, record against playoff teams, margin in head to head game, total points allowed, coin flip Due to continued usage of the "United Bowl" name by the Indoor Football League (an issue that also affected the UFL), the UIFL continued to use the "Ultimate Bowl" name for its championship, despite the change in the league's name. N1-Cincinnati N2-Erie N3-Marion S1-Florida S2-Lakeland Raiders

Qualifier
3 | Marion | 47
2 | Erie | 56

Conference Championships
2 | Erie | 42
1 | Cincinnati | 60
2 | Lakeland | 29
1 | Florida | 60

Ultimate Bowl II
N1 | Cincinnati | 62
S1 | Florida | 44

2012 Ultimate Indoor Football League seasons
| Cincinnati | Eastern Kentucky | Erie | Florida | Johnstown | Lakeland | Marion | Mississippi | Rome | Western Pennsylvania |
