= Jim Brandon Equestrian Center =

Equestrian center in West Palm Beach, Florida

Coordinates: 26.64663°N 80.16717°W

The Jim Brandon Equestrian Center is a 111-acre world class equestrian showplace operated by the Palm Beach County Parks and Recreation Department in West Palm Beach, Florida. The facility is available for rent by application and reservation only. It hosts several local and national horse and dog shows. Built in 2005, it consists of: one covered arena; five additional rings; vendor areas; two barns – 128 total permanent lighted, matted stalls with sliding doors (water/electric included); fire sprinkler system; area for temporary barns; covered manure receptacles; covered wash racks; lunge ring; concession building; announcer building; show management office (air-conditioned with desks/phone); restroom buildings; ample horse trailer parking; WiFi. In 2007, the indoor arena was home to the short-lived Palm Beach Waves indoor football team.
