= Watsco Center =

Arena in Florida, United States

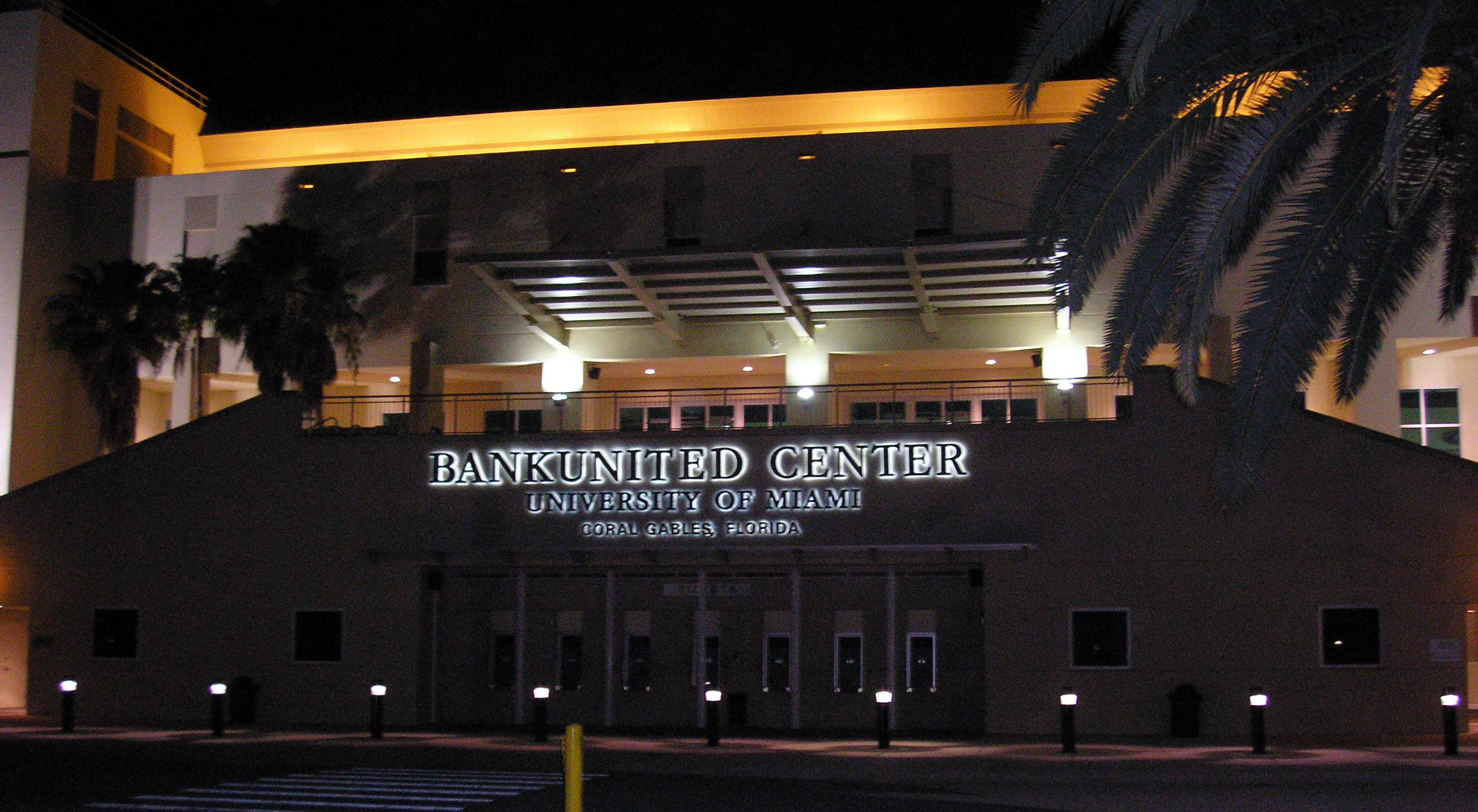
- The stadium in May 2009
- Interactive map of Watsco Center
- Full name: Watsco Center at the University of Miami
- Former names: Ryder Center (construction/planning); UM Convocation Center (2003–05); BankUnited Center (2005–16)
- Address: 1245 Dauer Drive
- Location: Coral Gables, Florida, U.S
- Coordinates: 25°42′54″N 80°16′45″W
- Owner: University of Miami
- Operator: Oak View Group Facilities
- Capacity: 7,972 (basketball); 5,990 (ice hockey)
- Type: Arena
- Field size: Arena size: 200,000 square feet (19,000 m^{2})
- Current use: Basketball; Ice hockey
- Public transit: University; 56, 500

Construction
- Groundbreaking: April 4, 2001
- Opened: January 4, 2003; 23 years ago
- Cost: $48 million ($78.2 million in 2025 dollars)
- Architects: Ellerbe Becket; Spillis Candela
- General contractor: Turner Construction

Tenants
- Miami Hurricanes (NCAA) teams: men's and women's basketball (2003–present); Professional teams: Miami Vice Squad (NIFL) (2007); Miami Inferno (UIFL) (2014); Florida Mayhem (OWL) (2018–2023)

Website
- watscocenter.com

The Watsco Center (originally named the University of Miami Convocation Center) is an 8,000-seat multi-purpose arena on the campus of the University of Miami in Coral Gables, Florida. The venue hosts concerts, family shows, trade shows, lecture series, university events and sporting events, and serves as the home court to the Miami Hurricanes' men's and women's basketball teams.

== History ==
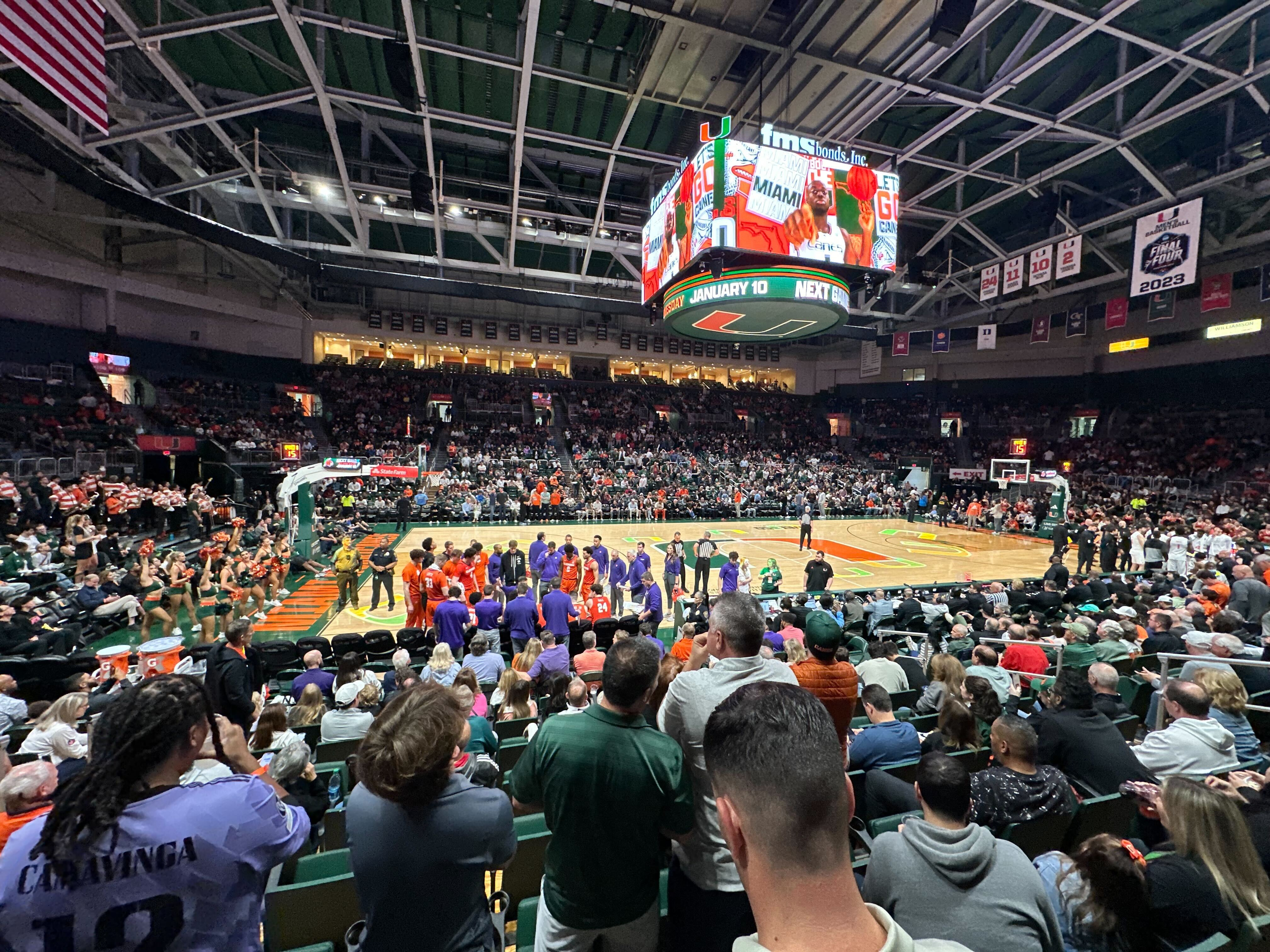
The Miami Hurricanes Men's Basketball Team hosts Clemson for an ACC conference game on January 3, 2024

The arena opened in 2003 and was originally named the University of Miami Convocation Center. The arena is home to the Miami Hurricanes men's and women's basketball teams. Additional events held in the Watsco Center include concerts, sporting events, lectures, award shows, high school graduations, and men's and women's basketball games. It is the largest arena ever built on the University of Miami campus.

In 2005, the arena was renamed the BankUnited Center, after Miami Lakes-based BankUnited. In 2016, Miami-based air conditioning company Watsco acquired the naming rights.

Prior to the opening of the Watsco Center, from 1988 until 2002, the school's basketball teams played their home games at Miami Arena.

=== U.S. presidential debates ===
The Watsco Center has hosted two U.S. presidential debates to date:

On September 30, 2004, the University of Miami hosted one of the three nationally televised U.S. presidential debates between presidential candidates George W. Bush and John Kerry during the 2004 presidential election at the Watsco Center. The debate, which was moderated by Jim Lehrer of PBS NewsHour, was viewed by 62.5 million people.

On March 10, 2016, the University of Miami hosted the 2016 Republican presidential primary's twelfth and final debate at Watsco Center, which aired nationally on CNN and featured Republican presidential candidates Ted Cruz, John Kasich, Marco Rubio, and Donald Trump.

== Ranking ==
The 2007 issue of Venues Today, an entertainment industry publication, reports that the Watsco Center outperformed all but one other venue in Florida in its size category for number of concerts and touring events held in 2006.

== See also ==
- List of NCAA Division I basketball arenas
