= Huntington Bank Arena =

Arena and conference center in Tupelo, Mississippi

- Interactive map of Huntington Bank Arena
- Former names: Tupelo Coliseum; BancorpSouth Center; BancorpSouth Arena; Cadence Bank Arena
- Location: 375 East Main Street, Tupelo, Mississippi 38804
- Coordinates: 34.260°N 88.700°W
- Capacity: 10,000
- Field size: 32,000 sq ft (3,000 m^{2}) without ice 209.5 ft (63.9 m) total floor length with south risers extended* 234 ft (71 m) total floor space with south risers folded* 130 ft (40 m) total width* 70 ft (21 m) width seating* * (no ice)

Construction
- Opened: October 9, 1993

Tenants
- Tupelo Hound Dogs (EISL) (1997); Tupelo T-Rex (WPHL) (1998–2001); Tupelo FireAntz (NIFL/UIF) (2001–2005); Mississippi MudCats (AIFA) (2007–2008); Mississippi Hound Dogs (UIFL) (2012)

Huntington Bank Arena, formerly Tupelo Coliseum, BancorpSouth Center, BancorpSouth Arena, and Cadence Bank Arena is a 10,000-seat multi-purpose arena, near downtown Tupelo, Mississippi, named for Huntington Bancshares, a large multi-state commercial banking company.

It was the home of the Tupelo FireAntz and Mississippi MudCats arena football teams, the Tupelo T-Rex ice hockey team and the Tupelo Hound Dogs of the Eastern Indoor Soccer League. It was also the home of the Mississippi Hound Dogs of the Ultimate Indoor Football League.

The $16 million, 32,000 sq ft (3,000 m^{2}) facility was built in 1993, and is one of the more modern arenas serving a small market in the mid-south. Its lot was previously occupied by a shopping mall called Downtown Mall. When the mall closed in 1990 the arena was retrofitted from the old building.

The arena also seats 8,000 for sports events, ranging from basketball to rodeos.

== Notable events ==
=== Sports ===
- WCW Uncensored (1995)
- WCW Uncensored (1996),
- WCW Spring Stampede (1997),
- Gulf South Conference Basketball Tournament (2001-2005)

The arena has also hosted the Harlem Globetrotters on several occasions. One Memphis Pharaohs (Arena Football League) home game was held there in 1996.

=== Concerts ===
- Elton John
- Backstreet Boys
- Journey
- Toby Keith
- Brad Paisley
- Florida Georgia Line
- Kenny Chesney
- Aerosmith
- Tim McGraw
- Faith Hill
- Miranda Lambert
- Chris Young
- Lynyrd Skynyrd
- Rae Sremmurd
- Dwight Yoakam
- Reba McEntire
- Carrie Underwood

The arena can be scaled down to 4,500 for theater-style concerts. The arena is also used for trade shows and conventions (33,800 sq ft [3,140 m^{2}]) of exhibit space plus 5,000 sq ft (460 m^{2}) of meeting space).

On November 14, 2008, the arena hosted the Mississippi State Bulldogs club hockey team in a game against the Loyola University New Orleans club in the arena's first venture into ice hockey since the T-Rex left in 2001.

On November 21, 2010, the BancorpSouth Arena hosted a college basketball game featuring the Memphis Tigers and the LSU Tigers.

On December 14, 2024, Cadence Bank Arena hosted a matchup between McNeese State and Mississippi State, two teams that later made appearances in the NCAA tournament.

Preceded by Pyramid Arena	Home of the Memphis Pharaohs; 1996 (One game)	Succeeded by Rose Garden Arena
