= Hertz Arena =

Multi-purpose arena in Estero, Florida, U.S.

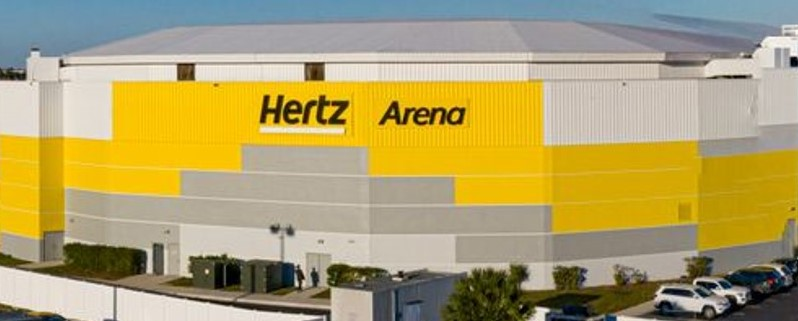
- View of the arena from the West in 2020

- Location within Florida Location within the United States
- Former names: Everblades Arena (1998); TECO Arena (1998–2004); Germain Arena (2004–2018)
- Address: 11000 Everblades Parkway
- Location: Estero, Florida, U.S.
- Coordinates: 26°26′26″N 81°46′44″W
- Owner: David Hoffmann
- Operator: Hoffmann Family of Companies
- Capacity: Center stage: 8,284; Endstage: 7,380; Half house: 5,090; Hockey: 7,084
- Executive suites: 24
- Type: Arena
- Event: Hockey
- Surface: Multi-surface
- Scoreboard: Yes
- Acreage: 30

Construction
- Groundbreaking: November 1997
- Opened: November 2, 1998
- Architect: BBB Architects
- Structural engineers: LCM Engineering, Inc.
- Services engineer: The Mitchell Partnership Inc.
- General contractor: Walbridge-Aldinger

Tenants
- Florida Everblades (ECHL) (1998–present); Florida Sea Dragons (USBL) (2000–2003); Florida Firecats (af2) (2001–2009); Florida Flame (NBDL/NBA D-League) (2004–2006); Florida Tarpons (UIFL/XLIF/AIF/APF) (2012–2017); Florida Jr. Blades (USPHL)

Website
- hertzarena.com

Hertz Arena is a 7,084-seat multi-purpose arena in Estero, Florida, outside Ft. Myers, Florida, which is located between Miromar Lakes, Florida and Bonita Springs, Florida. The arena opened in November 1998 and serves as the home of the Florida Everblades of the ECHL.

== History ==
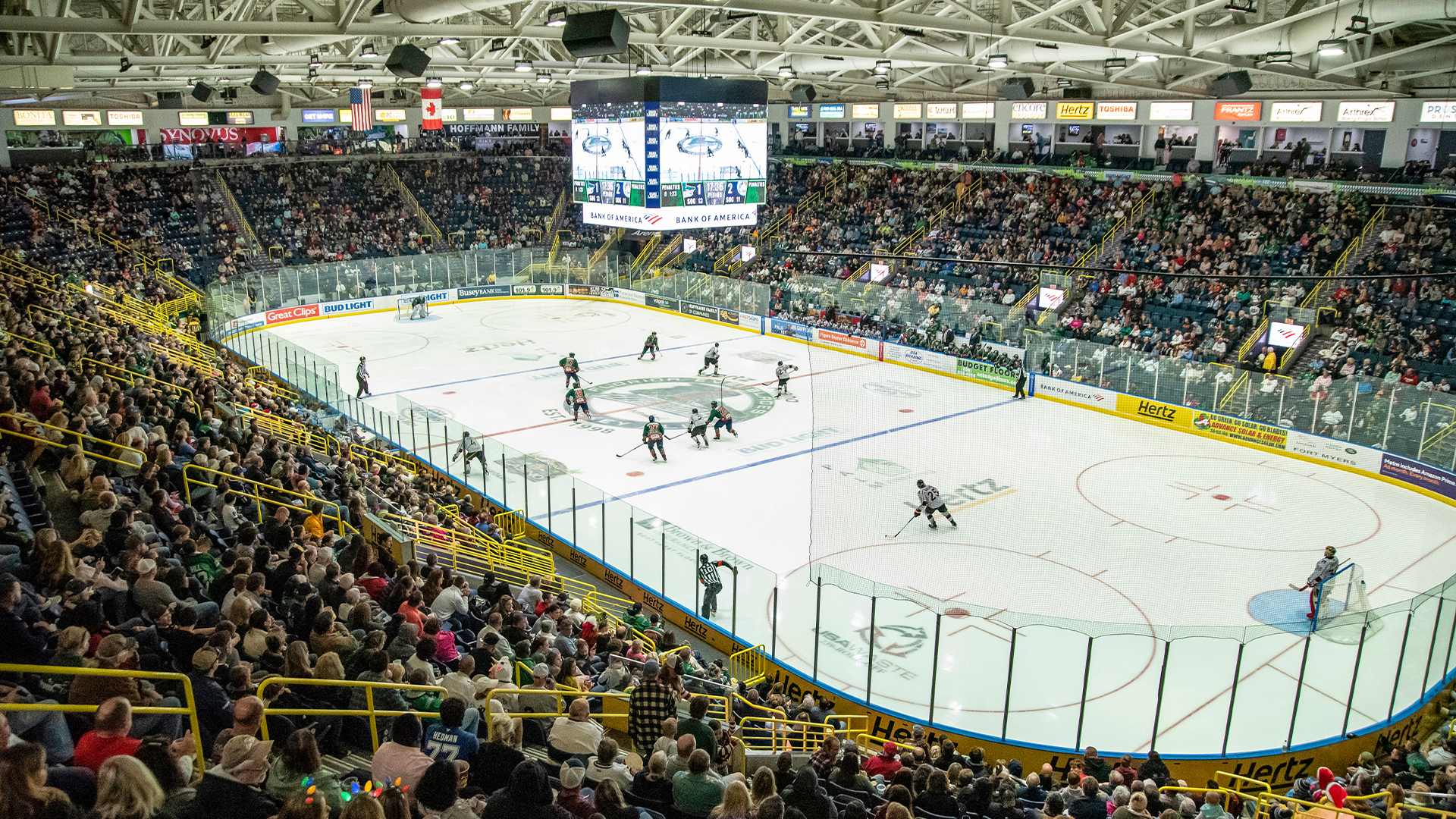
Hertz Arena hosting a professional hockey game – the Florida Everblades vs. Kansas City Mavericks on December 14, 2019.

The arena was first named Everblades Arena in 1998 after the hockey team that plays there. TECO Energy was the first company to obtain the naming rights to the building, changing the name to TECO Arena. In 2004, TECO Energy decided they were no longer interested in holding the naming rights. Germain Motor Company bought the rights, and in 2004 the venue was renamed to Germain Arena. This same company, an automobile dealership with locations in Florida, Arkansas, and Ohio, also held the naming rights to the Germain Amphitheater in Columbus, Ohio. In September 2018, The Hertz Corporation bought the naming rights for the arena and it was renamed Hertz Arena on October 1. The company petitioned the city to repaint the arena bright yellow with black accents to match their branding. In August 2019, the Hoffmann family entered into an agreement to purchase both the arena and hockey team as part of their plan to expand the entertainment segment in Southwest Florida.

=== Features of the Arena ===
Hertz Arena features LED lighting, luxury seating, a state-of-the-art sound system, video boards, a VIP lounge and much more. Some of the luxury seating options available at the arena include a lounge, suite and box seating. The arena's VIP lounge, which can be rented out for private events, contains a wide variety of amenities. The arena's video boards are used to broadcast live events and offer a variety of features, such as a multi-angle view, instant replays and a wide range of graphics.

== Tenants ==
The arena has been used as a multipurpose venue, primarily hosting the Florida Everblades ECHL ice hockey team. It was also the home for the Florida Flame NBA Development League team, the Florida Firecats and Florida Tarpons indoor football teams. Additionally, the venue has hosted various concerts, circuses, boxing, mixed martial arts events, AEW shows, Total Nonstop Action Wrestling shows, WWE shows, Professional Bull Riders events and family shows.

The arena is also home to the Florida Gulf Coast University Eagles club hockey team of the American Collegiate Hockey Association (ACHA). In March 2006 and March 2010, the facility hosted the Division 3 ACHA National Championships and in March 2008 the Division 2 ACHA National Championships.

The arena has also hosted a college hockey tournament, originally known as the Everblades College Classic and then the Florida College Hockey Classic. It was a four-team tournament was hosted by the University of Maine Black Bears and the Cornell University Big Red, and two other invited teams. The winner was awarded the Ned Harkness Cup.

On March 9, 2022, the arena had its first televised wrestling event as All Elite Wrestling (AEW) had its tapings of Dynamite and Rampage, marking AEW's debut to the Southwest Florida market.
