= Ultimate Indoor Football League =

Arena football league in the United States

- Most recent season or competition: 2014 UIFL season
- Ultimate Indoor Football League logo
- Formerly: United Indoor Football League
- Sport: Indoor football
- Founded: 2010
- Founder: Michael Taylor; Andrew Haines
- First season: 2011
- Folded: 2014
- President: Jim Krause
- Country: United States
- Last champion: Corpus Christi Fury
- Most titles: Cincinnati Commandos; Corpus Christi Fury; Florida Tarpons & Saginaw Sting (1)
- Sponsors: Rawlings; Conquest Sports Foundation; Conquest Club Card; ProSportsRecruit.com; Trophy Awards; La Quinta Inns & Suites
- Related competitions: Champions Professional Indoor Football League; Continental Indoor Football League; Professional Indoor Football League
- Website: UIFLfootball.com

The Ultimate Indoor Football League (UIFL) was a regional professional indoor football league that began its inaugural season on February 18, 2011 as the Ultimate Indoor Football League before playing as the United Indoor Football League in 2012, then switched back to "Ultimate" for the 2013 season. After the 2014 season, the league merged with X-League Indoor Football.

== History ==
On February 18, 2011, the first-ever UIFL game was played between the Saginaw Sting and the Eastern Kentucky Drillers. The inaugural game was held at the Dow Event Center in Saginaw, Michigan. The league co-founders are Michael Taylor and Andrew Haines; Haines was also the owner and founder of the Atlantic/American Indoor Football League and the Mid-Atlantic Hockey League. The UIFL has a logo nearly identical to the one used by the AIFL in the 2006 season (though it favors blue instead of red), and will apparently also use the AIFL red, white, and blue football also in use in the American Indoor Football Association. The league is based in Canton, Ohio.

The league's first five teams were located in the Appalachia region, with teams based in Canton, Ohio; Johnstown, Pennsylvania; Pikeville, Kentucky; Highland Heights, Kentucky; and Huntington, West Virginia. Of those five markets, three (Canton, Johnstown, and Huntington) had teams in Haines' previous league, the AIFL. The two markets in Kentucky have never had a professional indoor football team in any league (though Highland Heights is considered part of the Cincinnati, Ohio metropolitan area, and the city of Cincinnati has had several indoor teams). The sixth team, the Saginaw Sting, came from the Indoor Football League.

== 2011 season ==
The complete 2011 season concluded without any teams folding, nor any games being missed or rescheduled. The Northern Kentucky River Monsters finished with the best regular season record, 11–3. However, due to league sanctions they were not able to host any playoff games and were dropped to a four seed.

Saginaw finished 9–5, followed by Eastern Kentucky at 8–6, Huntington at 7-7, Johnstown at 6–8, and Canton at 1–13.

Saginaw defeated Northern Kentucky, 48–47, in the first semifinals of the Ultimate Bowl I Playoffs, sponsored by Trophy Awards. In the other semifinal game, Eastern Kentucky advanced to the championship game with a 20–4 victory over Huntington. Ultimate Bowl I, also sponsored by Trophy Awards, was played Friday, June 9, 2011, at the Dow Center in Saginaw, MI, with the Sting claiming an 86–69 victory over the visiting Drillers.

Following the Northern Kentucky River Monsters' elimination from the playoffs, owner Jill Chitwood and the UIFL came to terms allowing the River Monsters to leave the UIFL. Draft

1. 1 overall pick: Victor Sesay, DL Johnstown Generals

== 2012 season ==
On June 15, 2011, Michael Taylor and Andrew Haines sold their controlling slate in the UIFL to Assured Equities IV, a Florida corporation, for the sum of 1.45 million dollars. As part of the acquisition, UIFL Co-founder Andrew Haines will remain as League President and a member of the Board of Directors, and UIFL Co-founder Michael Taylor will continue as a consultant and a member of the board of directors for Assured Equities.

For 2012, there will be at least eleven new expansion teams, based in Rome, Georgia; Estero, Florida; Tupelo, Mississippi; Marion, Ohio; Cincinnati, Ohio; Erie, Pennsylvania, and Lakeland, Florida. Of these markets, five (Rome, Tupelo, and Lakeland) previously had teams in the AIFL, while Estero previously had a team in arenafootball2; The Cincinnati Commandos and Marion Blue Racers have come previously from the Continental Indoor Football League; and the Erie Explosion moves from the Southern Indoor Football League. (Incidentally, the acquisition of the Explosion brings the league full-circle; the Explosion was the last surviving remnant of the AIFL, tracing its history to the Erie Freeze in 2005.)

On July 22, 2011, the UIFL named Jared Lorenzen the league's Commissioner.

On January 19, 2012, the league was sold by Cecil Van Dyke and Assured Equities IV, back to Andrew Haines and Michael Taylor. The league took on the name United Indoor Football League for the 2012 season (at the time, the United (outdoor) Football League had suspended operations; the league reverted to the Ultimate Indoor Football League when the outdoor UFL ended its suspension). Six teams folded in the process, including charter members Canton and Huntington, plus four teams (Carolina Aviators, Danville Dragons, Tennessee Rail Runners, and Kentucky Monsters) that never took the field, reducing the number of teams in the league from 16 to 10. Haines resigned his post as league president in June 2012.

== 2013 season ==
The 2013 season saw a reduction to six teams. Furthermore, prior to championship weekend, three of the four teams that had been eliminated had announced their intentions to jump leagues and join the Xtreme Indoor Football League. The UIFL has stated it is exploring all options regarding the future of the league. The Florida Tarpons won Ultimate Bowl III, with a victory over the Corpus Christi Fury.

== 2014 season ==
The UIFL fielded four teams for the 2014 season; in addition to the returning Tarpons and Fury, the Miami Inferno and Missouri Voodoo joined the league. Another team called the Austin Nitro had been listed on the UIFL's website, however, no further information was ever announced about that team. In addition, a new team based out of Columbia, South Carolina known as the Capital City Revolt was set to join in time for the 2015 season. However, the Voodoo and Inferno both folded mid-season, leaving the Tarpons and Fury as the only two teams remaining in the UIFL for the season. After the Fury beat the Tarpons in Ultimate Bowl IV by a score of 60–23, both teams announced they were joining X-League Indoor Football for the 2015 season. With the Revolt's subsequent announcement of delay of operations until the 2016 season, the UIFL announced they were now defunct.

== Complete UIFL team roster ==
- Canton Cougars - played in 2011 season, then folded.
- Cincinnati Commandos - played in 2012 season, then announced return to Continental Indoor Football League. Folded before 2013 CIFL season began.
- Corpus Christi Fury - played from 2013 to 2014, then left to join X-League Indoor Football.
- Eastern Kentucky Drillers - played from 2011 to 2012, then left to join Continental Indoor Football League as Kentucky Drillers. Folded after 2013 CIFL season.
- Erie Explosion - played in 2012 season, then left to join Continental Indoor Football League.
- Florida Tarpons - played from 2012 to 2014, then left to join X-League Indoor Football.
- Georgia Rampage - originally announced as Rome River Dogs and later Rome Rampage, team played 2012 season as a travel-only squad, then moved to Dalton, Georgia for 2013 season. Left to form X-League Indoor Football.
- Huntington Hammer - played in 2011 season, then folded.
- Johnstown Generals - played from 2011 to 2012, then folded.
- Lakeland Raiders - played from 2012 to 2013, then left to join X-League Indoor Football as Florida Marine Raiders.
- Marion Blue Racers - played in 2012 season, then returned to Continental Indoor Football League.
- Miami Inferno - played in 2014 season, then folded midseason.
- Mississippi Hound Dogs - played in 2012 season as a travel-only team, then folded.
- Missouri Monsters - played in 2012 season, then left to form X-League Indoor Football as St. Louis Attack.
- Missouri Voodoo - played part of 2014 season, then ended season early to go amateur.
- Northern Kentucky River Monsters - played in 2011 season, mutually agreed to part ways with the UIFL. After two years of dormancy, team resumed in 2014 playing in the Continental Indoor Football League.
- Saginaw Sting - played in 2011 season, then returned to Continental Indoor Football League.
- Sarasota Thunder - played in 2013 season as a travel-only team, then folded.
- Western Pennsylvania Sting - played in 2012 season as a travel-only team. Was set to move to Miami, Florida to play 2013 season as Miami Sting, but folded before season started.

=== Announced but never began play ===
- Austin Nitro - to have played in 2014 in Austin, Texas
- Capital City Revolt - to have played in 2015 in Columbia, South Carolina
- Carolina Aviators - to have played in 2012 in Raleigh, North Carolina
- Danville Dragons - to have played in 2012 in Danville, Illinois
- Kentucky Monsters - to have played in 2012 in Highland Heights, Kentucky
- Tennessee Rail Runners - to have played in 2012 in East Ridge, Tennessee

=== Progression ===
Year	# of teams	Expansion teams	Folded teams	Annexed teams	Suspended teams	Left league	Relocated teams	Name changes
2011	6	Canton Cougars; Eastern Kentucky Drillers; Huntington Hammer; Johnstown Generals; Northern Kentucky River Monsters; Saginaw Sting						
2012	10	Florida Tarpons; Lakeland Raiders; Mississippi Hound Dogs; Rome Rampage; Western Pennsylvania Sting	Canton Cougars; Huntington Hammer; Northern Kentucky River Monsters	Cincinnati Commandos*; Erie Explosion**; Marion Blue Racers*	Northern Kentucky River Monsters***; Saginaw Sting***	Saginaw Sting****		
2013	6	Corpus Christi Fury; Missouri Monsters; Sarasota Thunder				Cincinnati Commandos****; Erie Explosion****; Eastern Kentucky Drillers****; Marion Blue Racers****	Rome Rampage → Georgia Rampage; Western Pennsylvania Sting → Miami Sting***	
2014	4	Miami Inferno; Missouri Voodoo	Sarasota Thunder			Georgia Rampage*****; Lakeland Raiders*****; Missouri Monsters*****		

- * - Joined from Continental Indoor Football League
- ** - Joined from Southern Indoor Football League
- *** - Suspended indefinitely by the UIFL
- **** - Left for the CIFL
- ***** - Left for the X-League Indoor Football
