= Sports in the Tampa Bay area =

Overview of sports opportunities in the Tampa Bay area

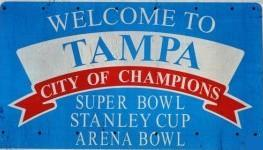
A road sign celebrating some of Tampa's sporting success. These signs can be seen in multiple places around the city.

The Tampa Bay area is home to many sports teams and has a substantial history of sporting activity. Most of the region's professional sports franchises use the name "Tampa Bay", which is the name of a body of water, not of any city. This is to emphasize that they represent the wider metropolitan area and not a particular municipality and was a tradition started by Tampa's first major sports team, the original Tampa Bay Rowdies, when they were founded in 1975.

Tampa currently has three franchises competing in the major professional sports leagues in the United States and Canada. The Tampa Bay Buccaneers play in the National Football League (NFL), the Tampa Bay Lightning play in the National Hockey League (NHL), and the Tampa Bay Rays play in Major League Baseball (MLB). Additionally, six MLB teams hold their spring training camps in the area.

A number of minor league franchises play in the region as well, including the Tampa Bay Rowdies of the USL Championship, Tampa Bay Sun FC of the USL Super League, and five minor league baseball teams competing in the Single-A Florida State League.

In intercollegiate sports, the University of South Florida Bulls compete in NCAA Division I, while Eckerd College, Saint Leo University and the University of Tampa compete in NCAA Division II.

Between September 2020 and July 2021 all three of Tampa Bay's major teams, as well as the Tampa Bay Rowdies, qualified for their sport's championship series at least once. The Lightning beat the Dallas Stars in the 2020 Stanley Cup Final, the Rays won the American League pennant to qualify for the 2020 World Series, the Rowdies and Phoenix Rising FC were named co-league champions after the USL Championship game was canceled due to COVID-19, the Buccaneers beat the Kansas City Chiefs in Super Bowl LV, and the Lightning beat the Montreal Canadiens in the 2021 Stanley Cup Final. The success continued with the Rowdies winning the 2021 USL regular season title and reaching the 2021 USL Championship game and the Lightning reaching the 2022 Stanley Cup Final. This dynasty earned the area the nickname "Champa Bay" and the city was named the best sports city in the country by Sports Business Journal.

== Major league ==
=== Summary ===
Team	Founded	Stadium	League	Championships
Tampa Bay Buccaneers	1976	Raymond James Stadium	NFL	2: 2002 (XXXVII), 2020 (LV)
Tampa Bay Lightning	1992	Benchmark International Arena	NHL	3: 2004, 2020, 2021
Tampa Bay Rays	1998	Tropicana Field	MLB	0

The Tampa Bay area has seen five championships among their three teams in the four major sports. The Tampa Bay Buccaneers won Super Bowl XXXVII in 2002 against the Oakland Raiders by a score of 48–21 and Super Bowl LV in 2020 against the Kansas City Chiefs by a score of 31–9. The Tampa Bay Lightning won the 2004 Stanley Cup Final by beating the Calgary Flames in seven games, the 2020 Stanley Cup Final by beating the Dallas Stars in six games, and the 2021 Stanley Cup Final by beating the Montreal Canadiens in five games. The Bucs also reached the NFC Championship Game in the 1979 and 1999 seasons, both times being beaten by the St. Louis Rams. The Lightning lost in the 2015 Finals against the Chicago Blackhawks and in the 2022 Finals against the Colorado Avalanche, along with playing in the 2011, 2016 and 2018 Conference Finals, each of which went to seven games. The Tampa Bay Rays played the 2008 World Series before losing to the Philadelphia Phillies in five games, and in the 2020 World Series, losing to the Los Angeles Dodgers in six games.

=== Football ===
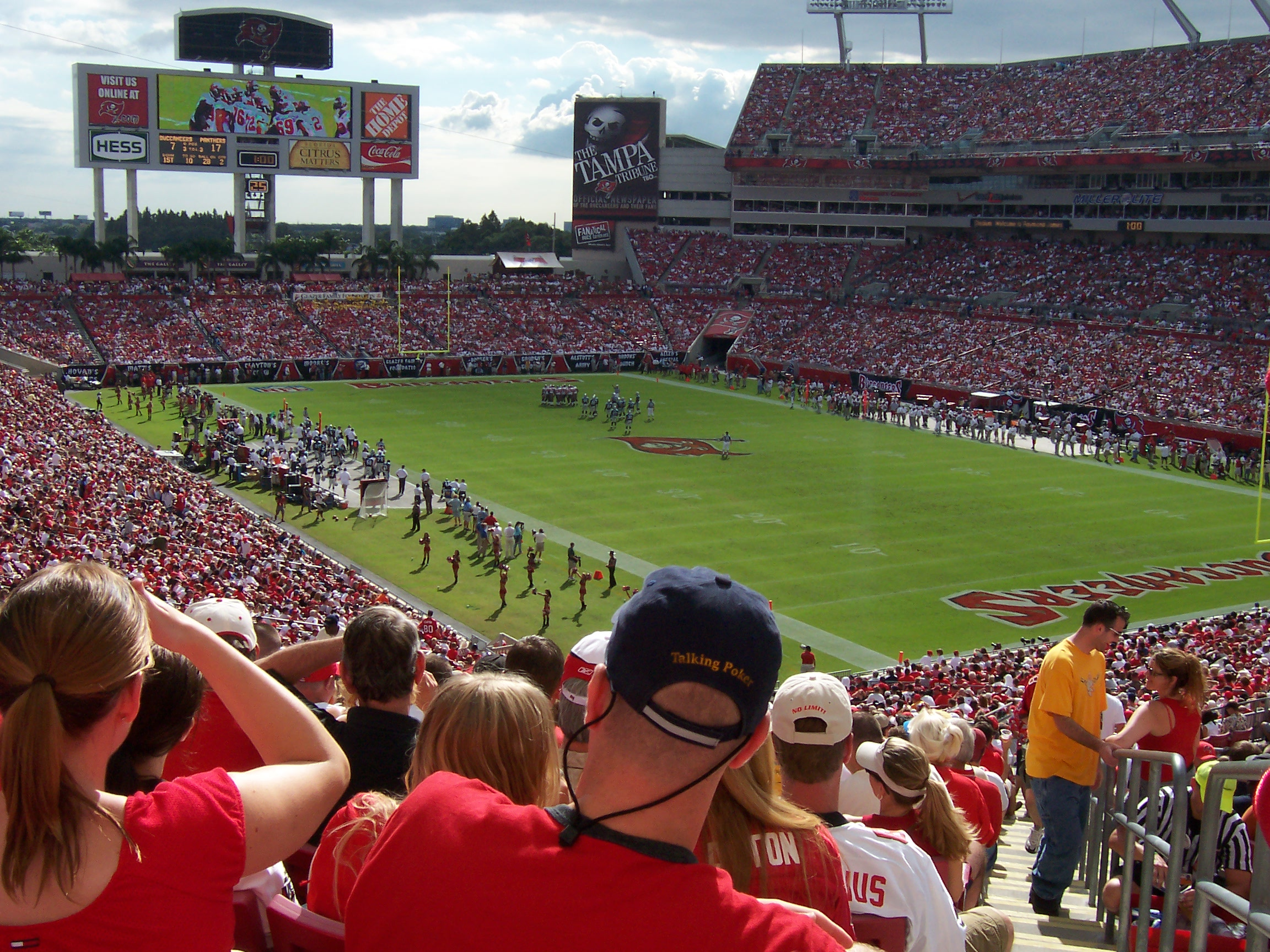
Buccaneer game action at Raymond James Stadium

Professional football first arrived in the Tampa Bay area in 1964, when the American Football League staged an exhibition game between the Buffalo Bills and the New York Jets. Five years later, the Miami Dolphins and the Minnesota Vikings faced off in a joint AFL-NFL preseason game prior to the 1969 season, the final one before the two leagues would merge.

The Tampa Bay Buccaneers of the NFL began play in old Tampa Stadium in 1976 as an expansion team. After losing an NFL-record 26 straight games to begin their existence, the Bucs reached the 1979 NFC Championship game only to sink back into futility with an NFL-record 14 straight losing seasons through the 1980s and early 1990s.

The franchise's fortunes began a turnaround in the mid-90s under coach Tony Dungy, and the success continued after the team moved into newly built Raymond James Stadium in 1998. The upward trend culminated in the Bucs' first championship at the end of the 2002 season under coach Jon Gruden, when they defeated the Oakland Raiders in Super Bowl XXXVII. The Bucs made several playoff appearances since then but didn't win another playoff game until the 2020 season, in which they reached Super Bowl LV and defeated the Kansas City Chiefs for their second title. Bruce Arians became the Bucs' head coach beginning with the 2019 season.

=== Baseball ===
==== Tampa Bay Rays ====
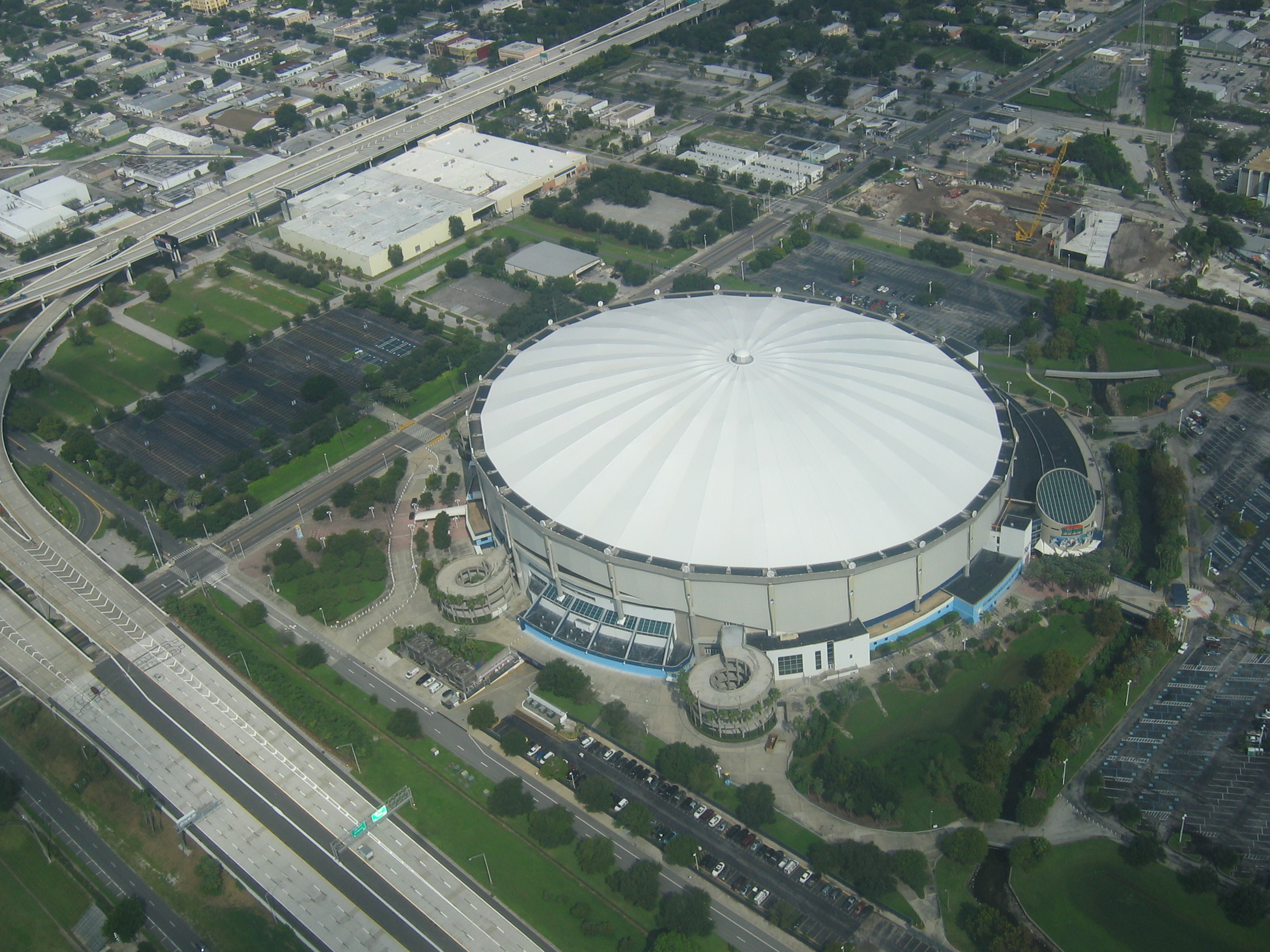
Tropicana Field (originally the "Florida Suncoast Dome")

Minor league, amateur, and spring training baseball have long been very popular in the Tampa Bay area. As such, a fierce cross-bay competition for a potential Major League Baseball franchise developed in the 1980s and 1990s, with Tampa and St. Petersburg each vying to bring professional baseball to town. Despite warnings from MLB that expansion was not imminent, St. Pete began construction of the Florida Suncoast Dome in 1987 in the hopes of eventually landing an MLB team through expansion or relocation.

Many teams, including the Oakland A's, Texas Rangers, Seattle Mariners, Chicago White Sox, Minnesota Twins, and San Francisco Giants, considered moving to the vacant venue. Local investors actually bought part ownership of the Twins and, in another attempt, had an agreement to buy the Giants and bring them to St. Pete. However, for various reasons, all these attempts to bring major league baseball to the area fell short.

Tampa Bay was rumored to be a front-runner when MLB expanded by two teams in 1991, but Miami and Denver were chosen instead. Finally, in March 1995, St. Petersburg was awarded a major league expansion franchise along with Phoenix.

The Tampa Bay Rays began play as the Tampa Bay Devil Rays in newly renamed Tropicana Field in 1998. The franchise struggled through its first 10 years of existence, finishing last in the American League East Division in nine of those ten seasons. After (again) posting the worst record in baseball in 2007, however, the newly renamed "Rays" won 97 games in 2008, winning the AL East and the AL pennant to earn a berth in the 2008 World Series under manager Joe Maddon. Since 2008 inclusive, the Rays have won three AL East titles and have made six playoff appearances, as well as a second World Series appearance in 2020. Kevin Cash has been the Rays' manager since 2015. Due to damage from Hurricane Milton on Tropicana Field, the Rays spent the 2025 season at George M. Steinbrenner Field, the spring training stadium of the New York Yankees.

==== Spring training and minor leagues ====
The area has had a long association with spring training baseball. The local tradition began in 1913, when the Chicago Cubs, lured by Tampa mayor D.B. McKay's pledge to pay the team's expenses, trained at Plant Field. St. Petersburg mayor Al Lang made a similar push, and in 1914, the St. Louis Browns became the first of many teams to train in St. Pete, being succeeded by the Philadelphia Phillies for 1915. The Phillies used a new facility called "Coffee Pot Bayou Park" along the city's bayfront area. In the 1940s, a small modern ballpark was built on the site. It would be christened Al Lang Field in honor of the mayor who had brought baseball to St. Petersburg.

Many major league teams have trained in the Tampa Bay area over the ensuing decades. Current members of the spring training Grapefruit League in the Tampa Bay area include:

- The Baltimore Orioles at Ed Smith Stadium in Sarasota
- The New York Yankees at George M. Steinbrenner Field in Tampa
- The Philadelphia Phillies at Spectrum Field in Clearwater
- The Pittsburgh Pirates at McKechnie Field in Bradenton
- The Toronto Blue Jays at TD Ballpark in Dunedin
- The Detroit Tigers at Joker Marchant Stadium in Lakeland

The area also hosts five minor league baseball teams, all in the Low-A Florida State League. These teams all use stadiums also used by MLB teams for spring training. These teams are:

- The Clearwater Threshers (Phillies): Spectrum Field in Clearwater
- The Dunedin Blue Jays: TD Ballpark in Dunedin
- The Bradenton Marauders (Pirates): McKechnie Field in Bradenton
- The Tampa Tarpons (Yankees): George M. Steinbrenner Field in Tampa
- The Lakeland Flying Tigers: Joker Marchant Stadium in Lakeland

==== Historical teams ====
Several other local minor league teams have come and gone over the years. Notable historical teams include:

- The Tampa Smokers – The area's first modern professional baseball team (1919), charter member of the original Florida State League (FSL)
- The St. Petersburg Saints – Founded in 1920, also played in the FSL
- The Tampa Tarpons – Long-time FSL affiliate of the Cincinnati Reds, alumni include several members of the "Big Red Machine"
- The Tampa Rockets – Local affiliate in the Florida State Negro League during the 1940s

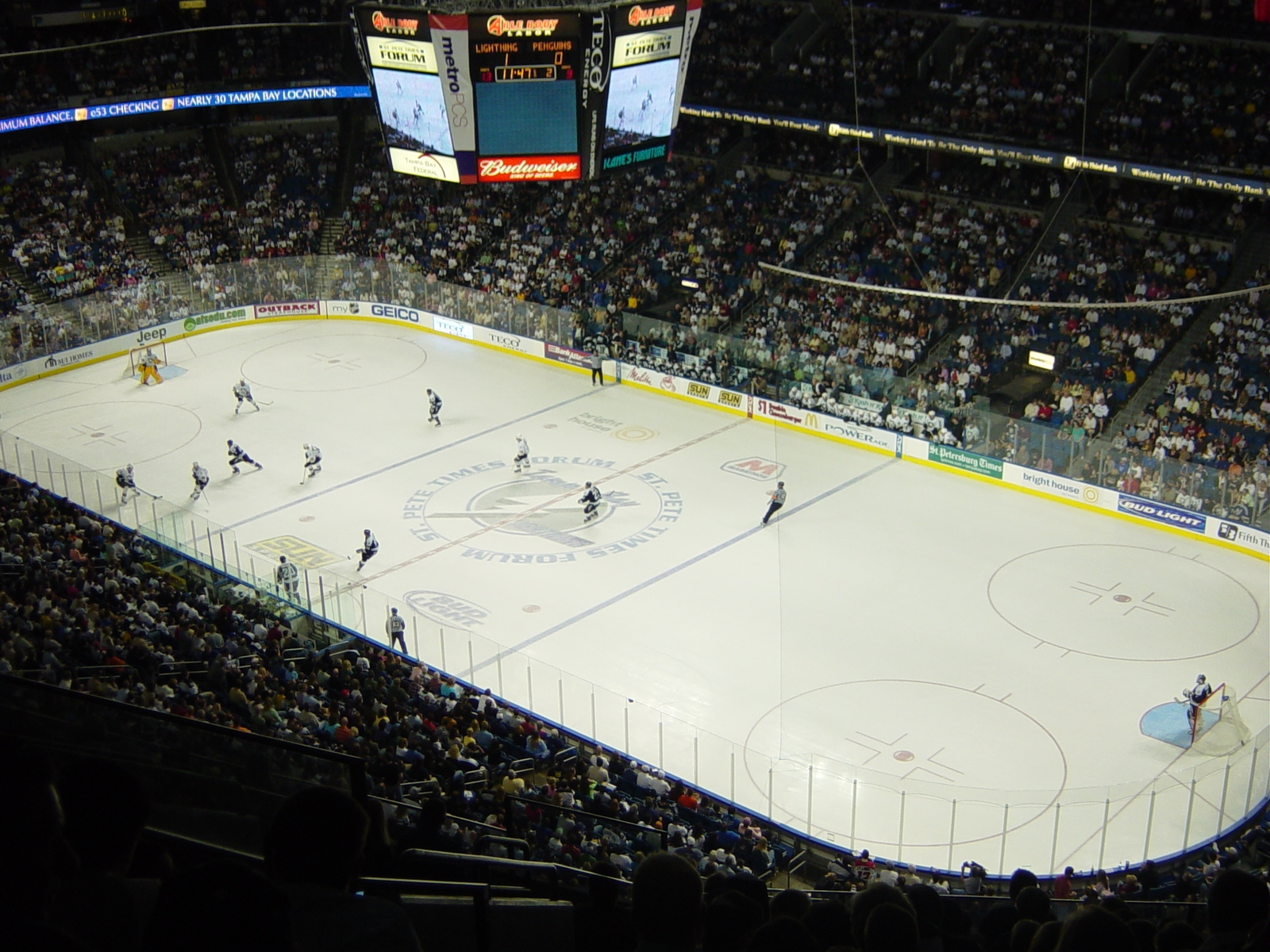
Inside the Benchmark International Arena during a Lightning game

=== Hockey ===
The NHL's Tampa Bay Lightning were established as an expansion franchise in 1992. They began play in the Florida State Fairgrounds' Expo Hall in Tampa, then moved across the Bay to what is now Tropicana Field in St. Petersburg (which was rechristened the "Thunderdome" at the time), and finally found a permanent home ice in the new Benchmark International Arena (originally known as the "Ice Palace"), located in the Channelside District of downtown Tampa. The Lightning have won three Stanley Cup championships: in 2004, 2020, and 2021. They have been coached by Jon Cooper since 2013.

== Minor league ==
=== Summary ===
The Tampa Bay area is home to numerous minor league sports teams. The most notable ones are:

Team	Founded	Sport	Venue	League	League championships
Tampa Bay Rowdies	2010	Soccer	Al Lang Stadium	USL Championship	2: 2012, 2020* *(co-champions)
Florida Tropics SC	2016	Indoor soccer	RP Funding Center	Major Arena Soccer League	1: 2020* *(co-champions)
Tampa Bay Sun FC	2024	Soccer	Riverfront Stadium	USL Super League	1: 2025
Tampa Bay Titans	2019	Basketball	Pasco-Hernando State College	The Basketball League	

Other minor league teams include:

Team	Founded	Sport	Venue	League	League championships
Tampa Bay Tiger Sharks	2017	Australian rules football	Various	USAFL	
Bay Area Pelicans Rugby Football Club	1977	Rugby union	Sawgrass Park	USA Rugby–Florida Rugby Union	"Several" (?)
Bradenton Marauders	1957 (as original Tampa Tarpons) 2010 (as Bradenton Marauders)	Baseball	LECOM Park	Florida State League	4: 1957, 1959, 1961, 2016
Clearwater Threshers	1985	Baseball	Spectrum Field	Florida State League	2: 1993, 2007
Tropics SC	2016	Soccer	Lake Myrtle Sports Complex	United Premier Soccer League	
Dunedin Blue Jays	1987	Baseball	TD Ballpark	Florida State League	1: 2017* *(co-champions)
Gulf Coast Lions	2020	Basketball	Salvation Army	The Basketball League	
IMG Academy Bradenton	1998	Soccer	IMG Academy	USL League Two	
Lakeland Flying Tigers	1963	Baseball	Joker Marchant Stadium	Florida State League	4: 1976, 1977, 1992, 2012
St. Petersburg Swans	2014	Australian rules football		United States Australian Football League, Major League Footy	
Tampa Bay Area Krewe Rugby Football Club	1989	Rugby union	Skyview Park	USA Rugby–Florida Rugby Union	7: Division I: Florida Cup (2010) Division II: National Champion (2010), Rugby South (2009) Division III: Florida Cup (1997, 2008, 2009, 2010)
Tampa Bay Hellenic	2008	Soccer	Ed Radice Sports Complex	Women's Premier Soccer League	
Tampa Bay Inferno	2010	Women's American football	Skyway Park	Women's Football Alliance	
Tampa Bay Irish Sports Club	2011	Hurling, Camogie, Gaelic football		Gaelic Athletic Association	2: Tom Mollohan Hurling Invitational (2014); Florida Cup Gaelic Football (2013)
Tampa Mayhem	2014	Rugby league	Larry Sanders Park	USA Rugby League	2021 USA Rugby League Premiership Champions
Tampa Marauders FC	2012	Soccer	Naimoli Family Athletic and Intramural Complex	National Premier Soccer League	
Tampa Tarpons	1994	Baseball	George M. Steinbrenner Field	Florida State League	5: 1994, 2001*, 2004*, 2009, 2010 *(co-champions)
Lakeland Magic	2008	Basketball	RP Funding Center	NBA G League	1: 2021

=== Soccer ===
==== Rowdies ====
The Tampa Bay Rowdies are a member of the USL Championship (USLC), competing in the second tier of the United States soccer pyramid. The franchise considers itself to be a phoenix club of the original Tampa Bay Rowdies of the first NASL and displays a star on its shield commemorating the 1975 championship. Though the owners intended to use the Rowdies name from the beginning, trademark issues forced the team to call itself FC Tampa Bay when it took the pitch as an expansion franchise of the USSF Division 2 Professional League in 2010. The team transitioned into the second NASL for 2011 and obtained the rights to the Rowdies name for 2012. The team moved to the United Soccer League Championship, then known as the United Soccer League, in 2016 as a part of their bid for expansion to the MLS.

The club played its first season in George M. Steinbrenner Field in Tampa before moving to St. Petersburg's Al Lang Stadium for subsequent seasons. In 2012, the Rowdies won the NASL's Soccer Bowl to claim the league championship. They were USL Regular Season champions and Eastern Conference champions in 2020 and were then named league co-champions along with the Phoenix Rising after the title game had to be canceled because of COVID-19. They repeated as Eastern Conference champions in 2021 but lost in the title game.

==== Sun ====
Tampa Bay Sun FC is Tampa's first and only fully professional women's sports team. They play in the USL Super League, which is the joint-highest level women's soccer league in the United States. The Sun won the league title in 2025, their inaugural season.

==== Tropics ====
Florida Tropics SC compete in indoor soccer in the Major Arena Soccer League. Like the Rowdies, they shared the 2020 league title as co-champions with the Monterrey Flash. They won the regular season league title in 2021.

=== Basketball ===
The Tampa Bay Titans play in The Basketball League (TBL). Their home games are played at A. P. Leto High School.

The Tampa Bay area does not have a team in the NBA or the NBA G League. The closest NBA team to the area are the Orlando Magic, 84 miles northeast. The closest G League team are the Osceola Magic, 84 miles east. Amalie Arena was used as the home of the NBA's Toronto Raptors for the 2020–2021 season because of Canadian government regulations due to the COVID-19 pandemic in Canada. It was the first time an NBA team played home games in Tampa, though some exhibition preseason games had been played in Tampa between the Orlando Magic and Miami Heat prior to this.

Former minor league teams include The St. Pete Tide and the Tampa Gunners, which played in the Florida Basketball Association (FBA). The Tide's home games were played at St. Petersburg Catholic High School, and the Gunners were a travel team.

== College ==
The Tampa Bay Area is home to four colleges and universities which compete in NCAA sports.

School	Nickname	Division	Primary conference	National championships
University of South Florida	Bulls	NCAA Division I	American Athletic Conference	6
Eckerd College	Tritons	NCAA Division II	Sunshine State Conference	0
Saint Leo University	Lions	NCAA Division II	Sunshine State Conference	1
University of Tampa	Spartans	NCAA Division II	Sunshine State Conference	19

=== University of South Florida ===
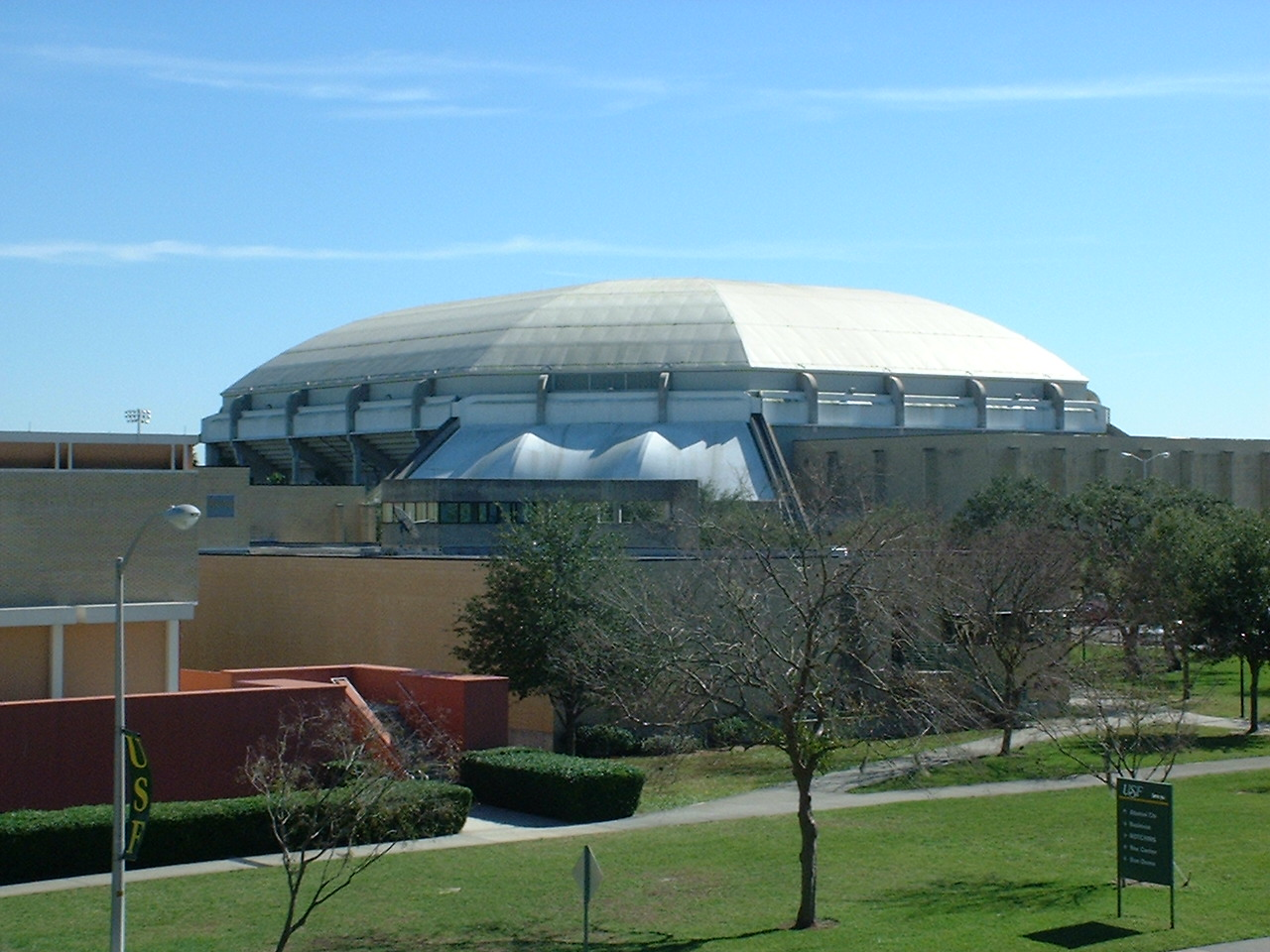
Yuengling Center

The University of South Florida Bulls compete in NCAA Division I, the highest level of college sports. USF opened in north Tampa in 1960 and started its sports program in 1965 with a men's soccer squad. The school gradually added more sports in the ensuing years, including men's basketball in 1971 and women's basketball in 1972. The hoops teams mainly played in Curtis Hixon Hall in downtown Tampa until 1980, when the school opened the on-campus USF Sun Dome, now known as Yuengling Center, for use by its basketball and volleyball teams.

USF began a football program in 1997. They played in Tampa Stadium for one season, then moved into newly built Raymond James Stadium the following year. The program competed as an NCAA Division I-AA independent during its first four seasons until 2001, when the Bulls moved up to Division I-A. They joined Conference USA in 2003, switched to the Big East Conference in 2005, and became a charter member of the American Athletic Conference in 2013.

After joining the Big East, the Bulls began a streak of six straight bowl game appearances. The 2007 season was the program's most successful so far, as the team reached as high as #2 in the BCS rankings under coach Jim Leavitt.

The Bulls have won six national championships in school history: softball in 1983 and 1984, women's swimming in 1985, and sailing in 2009, 2016, and 2017. Individuals and relay teams have combined to win 24 national championships for USF.

=== University of Tampa ===
The University of Tampa has the oldest collegiate sports program in the area, dating to 1933, when the school first fielded a football team. The "Tampa U" Spartans played at Plant Field for three seasons before moving to Phillips Field in 1936. They were the first team to call Tampa Stadium home when it opened in 1967. The Spartans moved up to play NCAA Division I football and produced several NFL stars, before dropping the sport entirely after the 1974 season due to budgetary concerns.

Currently, UT competes at the NCAA Division II level in the Sunshine State Conference (SSC). UT is among the top schools in the SSC in both championships and student-athletes named to the Commissioner's Honor Roll. Spartan teams have won 19 NCAA Division II titles: men's soccer in 1981, 1994 and 2001, women's soccer in 2007, baseball in 1992, 1993, 1998, 2006, 2007, 2013, 2015, and 2019, men's golf in 1987 and 1988, volleyball 2007, 2014, 2018, and 2021, and beach volleyball in 2019. Two individuals have also won national titles. With national championships in 2006 and 2007, the Spartan baseball team became the first team in Division II baseball to win consecutive titles since they did it previously in 1992 and 1993. The school's basketball and volleyball teams have played in the on-campus Bob Martinez Sports Center since 1984.

=== Saint Leo University ===
Though Saint Leo was established as a college in 1889 and is much older than any of the other college in the Tampa Bay area, a good portion of their early history was spent as a college preparatory school. The college was re-established in 1959. SLU teams participate as a member of the NCAA's Division II. The Lions are charter members of the Sunshine State Conference. Men's sports include baseball, basketball, cross country, golf, lacrosse, soccer, swimming and tennis; while women's sports include basketball, cross country, golf, lacrosse, soccer, softball, swimming, tennis and volleyball. The baseball team calls Thomas B. Southard Stadium home. The Marion Bowman Center is used for basketball and volleyball. Marion Bowman Aquatics Center hosts the swim team. Soccer, tennis and lacrosse are also played at on-campus facilities. The men's and women's golf teams uses neighboring Lake Jovita Golf & Country Club as their home course.

The men's golf team won the 2016 NCAA Division II title. It is the only team national title for the school, but three athletes have won individual titles at Saint Leo.

The school mascot is a lion named Fritz and the school colors are green and gold. Red Barrett, Jim Corsi, Sankar Montoute, Bob Tewksbury and J. P. Ricciardi are all notable alumni of Saint Leo athletics.

=== Eckerd College ===
Eckerd College is a charter member of the Sunshine State Conference (NCAA Division II) fielding 13 athletic teams in coed and women's sailing, men's and women's basketball, men's and women's soccer, baseball, volleyball, men's and women's golf, men's and women's tennis, and softball. The sailing team competes nationally as a member of the SAISA (the South Atlantic Intercollegiate Sailing Association) and is a member of the ICSA (Intercollegiate Sailing Association). The college's basketball and volleyball teams play in the McArthur Center's gymnasium. Eckerd's mascot is the Triton, and the school's colors, teal, navy and black were adopted by the athletic programs in 2005; previously the school's colors had been black, red, and white.

In 2006, for the first time in the 24-year history of the Eckerd College Women's Volleyball program, the Tritons qualified for the NCAA South Region tournament. Notable baseball alumni include Steve Balboni, Bill Evers, Joe Lefebvre and Brian Sabean.

== Defunct ==
Over the years, the Tampa Bay area was home to several professional sports franchises that eventually folded or relocated, including many short-lived minor league teams. Major and notable minor sports teams included:

Team	Years of operation	Sport	Venue	League	League championships
Tampa Smokers	1919–1932, 1946-1954	Baseball	Plant Field	Florida State League (1919–1927), Southeastern League (1929–1930), West Coast League (1932), Florida International League (1946–1954)	4: 1920, 1925, 1946, 1949
St. Petersburg Saints	1947–2000	Baseball	Al Lang Field	Florida International League (1947–1954), Florida State League (1955–2000)	8: 1951, 1958, 1959, 1967, 1973, 1975, 1986, 1997
Tampa Bay Rowdies (original)	1975–1993	Soccer	Tampa Stadium	North American Soccer League (1975–1984), American Indoor Soccer Association (1986–1987), American Soccer League (1988–1989), American Professional Soccer League (1990–1993)	4: 1975, 1976*, 1980*, 1983* *(NASL indoor title)
Tampa Bay Bandits	1983–1985	Football	Tampa Stadium	United States Football League	
Tampa Bay Storm	1991–2017	Arena football	Amalie Arena	Arena Football League	5: 1991 (V), 1993 (VII), 1995 (IX), 1996 (X), 2003 (XVII)
Tampa Bay Mutiny	1995–2001	Soccer	Raymond James Stadium	Major League Soccer	1: 1996 (Supporters' Shield)
Tampa Bay Thrillers	1984–1987 (Note: Relocated to Rapid City, South Dakota)	Basketball	Bayfront Center; Spartan Sports Center	Continental Basketball Association	3: 1985, 1986, 1987

=== Tampa Bay Rowdies ===
The Tampa Bay Rowdies were the first major professional sports team in the area. As such, they were also the first pro franchise to make Tampa Stadium its home field and the first to use "Tampa Bay" in their name. They began play in 1975 as an expansion franchise of the original North American Soccer League (NASL). The Rowdies won the inaugural Soccer Bowl in 1975, bringing Tampa Bay its first professional sports championship, and were successful for most of their existence. The NASL folded in 1984, but the Rowdies continued play in other outdoor and indoor soccer leagues (usually at Tampa Stadium and St. Petersburg's Bayfront Center, respectively) before finally folding in 1993.

A new incarnation of the Tampa Bay Rowdies in the second North American Soccer League took the pitch in 2010. While a licensing dispute forced the franchise to call itself "FC Tampa Bay" for its initial two seasons, the new club used the old club's green and gold color scheme and include a star for the Rowdies' 1975 championship in their team shield The team officially began using the "Rowdies" name for the 2012 season and promptly brought home the Soccer Bowl trophy that October. The current Rowdies now play in the second-tier USL Championship and were eastern conference champions and league co-champions in 2020 after the championship game was canceled due to the COVID-19 pandemic.

=== Tampa Bay Bandits ===

The Tampa Bay Bandits of the United States Football League (USFL) played three seasons in Tampa Stadium from 1983 to 1985. With innovative head coach Steve Spurrier and a fan-friendly atmosphere, "Banditball"'s local popularity rivaled that of the more-established Buccaneers, who were in the midst of a streak of 14 straight losing seasons during the Bandits' short existence.

The USFL decided to compete directly with the NFL in 1986 by moving its season from the spring to the fall. But after the infamous failure of the USFL's antitrust lawsuit against the NFL, the league folded instead. John Bassett, the principal owner of the Bandits, had opposed the USFL's fall strategy and planned to make the team a charter member of a new spring league. However, Bassett's failing health prevented this idea from becoming reality. He died from cancer in 1986, and the Bandits would not play another down.

In 2022, the USFL was recreated and announced that a new Tampa Bay Bandits team would take part in the league. Due to COVID-19, all games during the first season took place in Birmingham, Alabama. The new Bandits only played during the 2022 season, and were replaced by a new team in Memphis in 2023.

=== Tampa Bay Mutiny ===
The Tampa Bay Mutiny was a charter franchise of Major League Soccer. They began play at Tampa Stadium in 1996 and were immediately successful, winning the MLS Supporters' Shield in their inaugural season behind MLS MVP Carlos Valderrama and forward Roy Lassiter, whose 27 goals in 1996 stood as the MLS single-season record until 2018.

As the team transitioned into Raymond James Stadium for 1999, however, poor personnel moves (including the loaning away of stars Carlos Valderrama and Roy Lassiter) led to decreased win totals which led to decreased fan support. Unable to find local buyers and hampered by an unfavorable lease agreement for Raymond James Stadium, the league folded the franchise in 2001.

=== Tampa Bay Storm ===
The Tampa Bay Storm played in the Arena Football League. Originally established as the Pittsburgh Gladiators in 1987, the team moved to St. Petersburg and changed their name for the 1991 season. The newly christened Storm won their first ArenaBowl championship in their first season in the Tampa Bay area and won four more over the years, tied for the most titles (5) in AFL history. The Storm's original home turf was Tropicana Field, which was called the "Thunderdome" for a few years in honor of its two main tenants at the time: the Storm and the Tampa Bay Lightning. The Storm followed the Lightning to downtown Tampa in 1997 when they moved their home turf to the Ice Palace.

The Storm had one of the longest associations with their market of any AFL team and enjoyed strong local support, leading the league in attendance many times. In 2011, the franchise was purchased by Tampa Bay Entertainment Properties, the same group that owns the Tampa Bay Lightning and Amalie Arena. The Storm enjoyed continued success for a few more seasons while the AFL as a whole declined, dropping to only five franchises for the 2017 season. In December 2017, the Storm's ownership group announced that due to greatly reduced league revenues, the franchise would cease operations. However, they left open the possibility of reestablishing the Storm in a "stronger, reinvented AFL."

=== Other defunct teams ===
Team	Years of operation	Sport	Venue	League	League championships
St. Petersburg Saints	1908–1928	Baseball	Coffee Pot Park	Florida State League (1920–1928)	1: 1922
Bradenton Growers	1919–1926	Baseball	McKechnie Field	Florida State League	
Haven-Villa of Winter Haven	1926	Football	Winter Haven High School	Independent	
Tampa Cardinals	1926	Football	Plant Field, Adair Park, and others	Independent	
Tampa Rockets	1940s?	Baseball		Florida State Negro League	
St. Petersburg Pelicans	1940s–1950s?	Baseball	Campbell Park	Florida State Negro Baseball League	
Dunedin Blue Jays	1978–1979	Baseball	Grant Field	Florida State League	
Tampa Bay Flash/ Stars	1986–1987	Basketball		United States Basketball League	1: 1986
Bradenton Explorers	1989–1990	Baseball	Jackie Robinson Ballpark	Senior Professional Baseball Association	
St. Petersburg Pelicans	1989–1990	Baseball	Al Lang Stadium	Senior Professional Baseball Association	1: 1989
Tampa Bay Sunblasters	1992	Basketball		United States Basketball League	
Tampa Bay Tritons	1994	Roller hockey	Expo Hall	Roller Hockey International	
Tampa Bay Cyclones	1995–1996	Soccer		USISL Pro League (1995), USISL Select League (1996)	
Tampa Bay Terror	1995–1997	Indoor soccer	Bayfront Center	National Professional Soccer League	
Tampa Bay Windjammers	1996–2002	Basketball		United States Basketball League	
Tampa Bay FireStix	1997–2001	Softball		Women's Pro Fastpitch (1997–1998), Women's Professional Softball League (1998–2001)	1: 1999
Tampa Bay Xtreme	1997–2002	Soccer		W-League	
Tampa Bay Hawks	2000–2002	Soccer	Putnam Park	Premier Development League	
Tampa Bay ThunderDawgs	2000–2001	Basketball	Bayfront Center Arena	American Basketball Association	
Florida Redbacks	2003–2014	Australian rules football		United States Australian Football League-Eastern Australian Football League	
Bradenton Athletics	2004–2008	Soccer	IMG Soccer Academy	USL W-League	
Lakeland Thunderbolts	2005–2007	Indoor football	Lakeland Center	National Indoor Football League (2005–2006), American Indoor Football Association (2007)	
Tampa Bay Elite	2005–2007	Soccer		Women's Premier Soccer League	
Tampa Bay Sharks	2005–2010	Basketball	Bob Martinez Sports Center	Touring team (2005–2010), American Basketball Association (scheduled to begin in the 2010–2011 season but never played in any games)	
Tampa Bay Strong Dogs	2006	Basketball	Bob Martinez Sports Center	American Basketball Association	
Florida Scorpions	2008–2011	Football	Manatee Civic Center	National Indoor Football League (2008), American Professional Football League (2008, 2011)	
Florida Tuskers	2009–2010	Football		United Football League	
Tampa Breeze	2009–2012	Indoor football		Lingerie Football League (2009–2013), Legends Football League (2013–2014)	
VSI Tampa Bay FC	2011–2013	Soccer	Plant City Stadium	USL Pro	
VSI Tampa Bay FC (PDL)	2011–2013	Soccer	Plant City Stadium	Premier Development League	
VSI Tampa Bay FC (W-League)	2011–2013	Soccer	Plant City Stadium	W-League	
Florida Marine Raiders	2012–2015	Indoor Football	Lakeland Center	Ultimate Indoor Football League (2012–2013), X-League Indoor Football (2014–2015)	1: X-Bowl I
Lakeland Tarpons	2012-2019	Indoor Football	RP Funding Center		2: 2013, 2015
Sarasota Thunder	2012–2013	Indoor Football	Robarts Arena	Ultimate Indoor Football League	
Tampa Bay Vipers	2020	American football	Raymond James Stadium	XFL	
Tampa Bay Tornadoes	2020–2021	Indoor football	RP Funding Center	American Arena League	
Tampa Bay Bandits (2022)	2022	Football	Protective Stadium (Note: All USFL games during the 2022 season were played at Protective Stadium and Legion Field in Birmingham, Alabama. The team never actually played a game in Tampa.)	United States Football League (2022)	

== Championship events ==
- Tampa has hosted five Super Bowls. Super Bowl XVIII (1984) and Super Bowl XXV (1991) were held in Tampa Stadium; Super Bowl XXXV (2001), Super Bowl XLIII (2009), and Super Bowl LV (2021) were played in Raymond James Stadium. In Super Bowl LV, the Buccaneers became the first team in NFL history to play a Super Bowl in their home stadium. They defeated the Kansas City Chiefs 31–9 in the game.
- Two World Series games were played in St. Petersburg's Tropicana Field in the fall of 2008 when the Tampa Bay Rays hosted the Philadelphia Phillies.
- Four Stanley Cup Final games were played in Tampa's St. Pete Times Forum, now Benchmark International Arena, late in the spring of 2004 when the Tampa Bay Lightning hosted the Calgary Flames. Three games were hosted in 2015 as the Lightning faced the Chicago Blackhawks, and another three in each of 2021 and 2022 when they played the Montreal Canadiens and Colorado Avalanche, respectively.
- Three NASL indoor soccer championships were hosted by the Tampa Bay Rowdies at the Bayfront Center in St. Petersburg: 1976, 1979–80 and 1981–82.
- Three ArenaBowls were hosted by the Tampa Bay Storm: ArenaBowl IX in 1995 (at Tropicana Field), ArenaBowl XII in 1998, and ArenaBowl XVII in 2003 (both at Amalie Arena).
- The 1999 NCAA Division I Men's Final Four was played at Tropicana Field
- Amalie Arena hosted the NCAA Division I Women's Final Four in 2008, 2015, 2019, and 2025.
- The NCAA Division I Men's Soccer Championship final has been played in Tampa on five occasions. It was played at Tampa Stadium in 1978, 1979 and 1980 and played at the USF Soccer Stadium in 1990 and 1991.
- The NCAA Division II Men's Soccer Championship final has been played in Tampa on seven occasions, the most for any location. The 1983, 1987, 1992, 1994, and 2001 editions were played on the University of Tampa campus at Pepin-Rood Stadium. The 2008 and 2009 editions were played at its replacement on the same site, Pepin Stadium.
- The 1990 Davis Cup Final was played in St. Petersburg at Tropicana Field, then known as the Florida Suncoast Dome.
- The 2009 and 2023 NCAA Division I Women's Volleyball Final Four were held at Amalie Arena
- The 2012, 2016, and 2023 NCAA Men's Frozen Four were all held at Amalie Arena. To date this is the farthest South the tournament finals have been staged.
- The 2015 NCAA Division I Men's Golf Championship and 2015 NCAA Division I Women's Golf Championship were held at the Concession Golf Club in Bradenton and hosted by USF.
- In 2012, Al Lang Stadium hosted the second leg of the NASL Championship Series between the Tampa Bay Rowdies and the Minnesota Stars FC.
- Raymond James Stadium hosted the 2017 College Football Playoff National Championship.
- Tampa Stadium played host to the 1984 USFL Championship Game.
- Each spring at Raymond James Stadium hosts the USEF's top 30 ranked equestrians compete at the American Invitational for the sport's largest purse.
- The University of Tampa's Bob Martinez Sports Center hosted the 2021 NCAA Division II Women's Volleyball Final Four.
- Al Lang Stadium hosted the 2021 USL Championship Final.
- The inaugural USL Super League championship game was held at Riverfront Stadium in 2025.
- Tampa will host the 2026 NCAA Division I Men's Basketball First and Second Rounds at Benchmark International Arena.

=== Other events ===
Other notable sporting events in the area include:

- The NCAA football Division I FBS ReliaQuest Bowl at Raymond James Stadium is held in Tampa each January, usually on New Year's Day
- The NCAA football Division I FBS Gasparilla Bowl is also held at Raymond James Stadium, typically in December. It was originally played at Tropicana Field in St. Petersburg under several names before being moved to Tampa in 2018.
- The NCAA football East–West Shrine Game has been held annually at Tropicana Field since 2012.
- The Gasparilla Distance Classic road races are held annually in February in downtown Tampa.
- The Tampa Bay Derby (Grade II) thoroughbred horse race is held annually in mid March at Tampa Bay Downs near Oldsmar
- The USHRA holds an event every January at Raymond James Stadium.
- The NTT IndyCar Series Firestone Grand Prix of St. Petersburg is held on a course encompassing the Albert Whitted Airport and streets in the Bayfront area in St. Petersburg. The race has been held in 2003 & 2005–present. Other motorsports events include the SCCA Trans-Am Series, which competed at the Bayfront area from 1985 to 1990, and at a course surrounding Tropicana Field from 1996 to 1997. In 1989 and 1990, IMSA held a race at the Florida State Fairgrounds.
- The 1978 NFL Pro Bowl was held in Tampa at Tampa Stadium.
- The 1999 and 2018 NHL All-Star Games were held in Tampa at Amalie Arena.
- The 2008 and 2009 ACC Championship Games for football were held at Raymond James Stadium.
- The Tampa Bay Derby (Grade II) thoroughbred horse race is held annually in mid March at Tampa Bay Downs near Oldsmar.
- The NTT IndyCar Series's Firestone Grand Prix of St. Petersburg is held annually during the first weekend of April.
- The USEF's top 30 ranked equestrians compete each spring in the American Invitational for the sport's largest purse in Tampa at Raymond James Stadium.
- The 2022 Isobel Cup playoffs were held at AdventHealth Center Ice in Wesley Chapel.

== Venues - Current ==
=== Raymond James Stadium ===
Raymond James Stadium is home to the Tampa Bay Buccaneers and the South Florida Bulls football team. The stadium seats 65,618, which can be expanded to about 75,000 for special events with the addition of temporary seating. The stadium has been the site of three Super Bowls: Super Bowl XXXV in 2001, Super Bowl XLIII in 2009, and Super Bowl LV in 2021. Raymond James Stadium is the home of the annual Outback Bowl (since 1999) and Gasparilla Bowl (since 2018) and was the site of the College Football Playoff National Championship in 2017. Raymond James Stadium was also the site of WrestleMania 37 in April 2021.

=== Benchmark International Arena ===
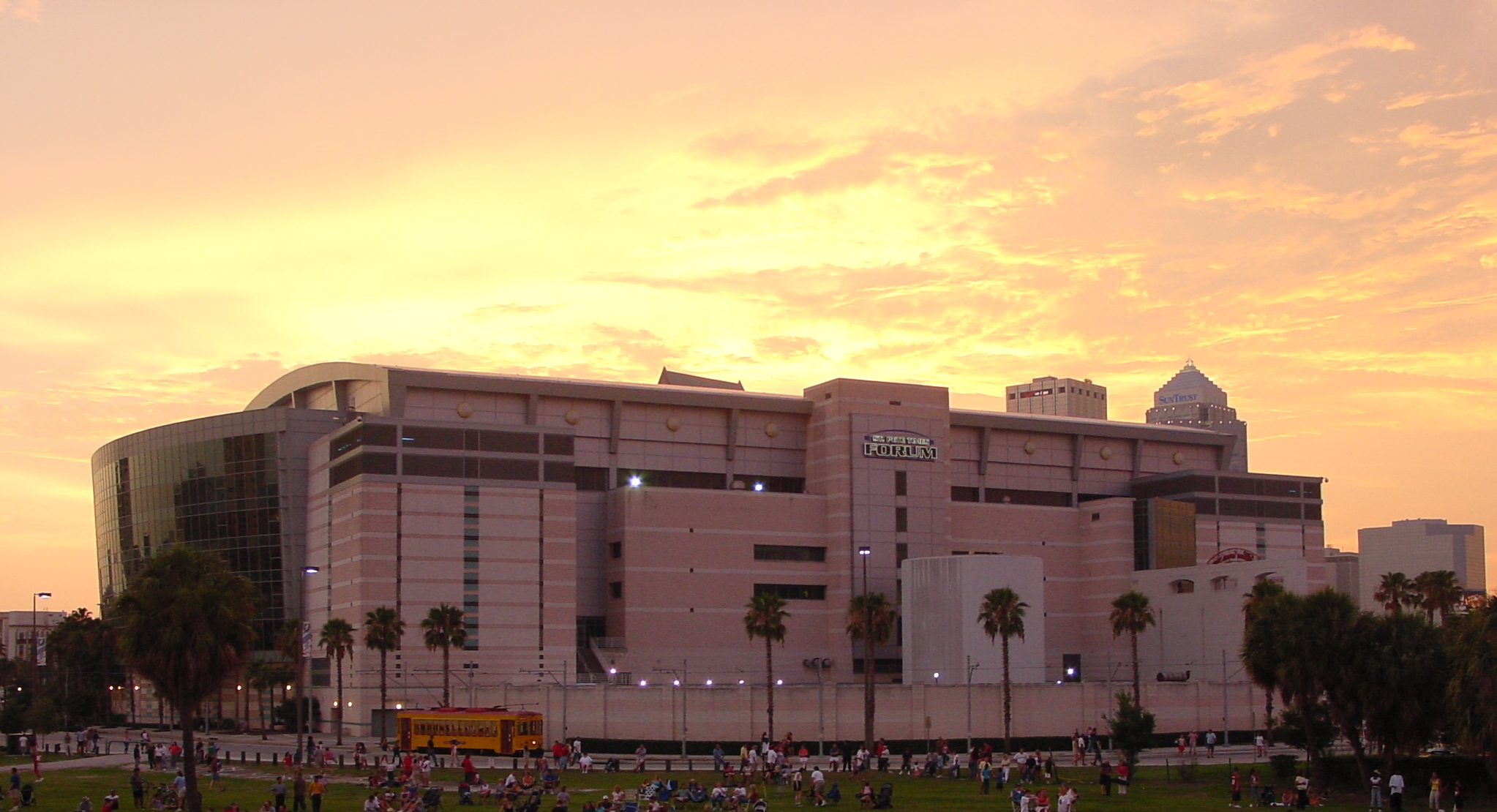
Benchmark International Arena

Benchmark International Arena is located in downtown Tampa's Channelside District and is home to the Tampa Bay Lightning. Other entertainment events occasionally held in the arena include concerts, NBA exhibition games, USF men's basketball and NCAA men's and women's basketball tournament games, and Frozen Four games.

=== Tropicana Field ===
Tropicana Field is an indoor domed stadium in St. Petersburg that is home to the Tampa Bay Rays. It has also hosted the Tampa Bay Lightning, college football bowl games, WWE ThunderDome, the 1999 NCAA Division I Men's Basketball Final Four, the 2024 Royal Rumble.

=== Al Lang Stadium ===
Al Lang Stadium in St. Petersburg is home to the Tampa Bay Rowdies. It opened in 1947 and was used as a minor league baseball field for most of its history. It is named for a former mayor of St. Pete.

=== Yuengling Center ===
The Yuengling Center (formerly the USF Sun Dome) is an indoor arena on the campus of the University of South Florida. It is currently used by the USF men's basketball team, women's basketball team, and women's volleyball team, as well as other university events. It opened in 1980.

== Venues - Historical ==
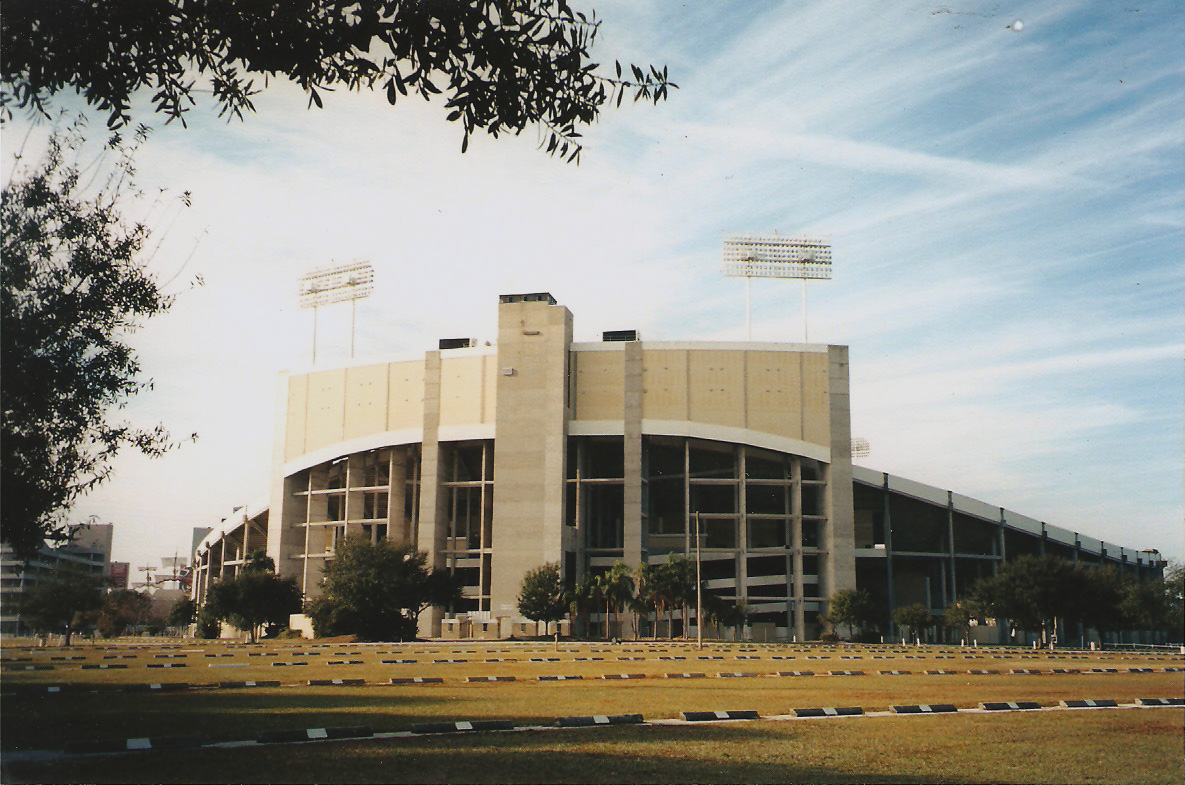
Tampa Stadium in early 1998

=== Tampa Stadium ===
Tampa Stadium was the first large modern sports venue in the area, holding over 73,000 fans in its final configuration. It was built in 1967 for the University of Tampa Spartans college football program with an eye toward future NFL expansion. "Tampa U" discontinued its football program in 1974, but Tampa Stadium was soon put back to use when the Tampa Bay Rowdies began play in 1975 and the Tampa Bay Buccaneers kicked off in 1976.

In its day, the "Big Sombrero" was also home to the Tampa Bay Bandits of the USFL, the Tampa Bay Mutiny of MLS, and USF Bulls football. It hosted two Super Bowls and a Pro Bowl along with numerous special events and large concerts, such as a 1973 Led Zeppelin concert that broke the all-time record for the largest crowd to see a single artist and a 1977 Led Zeppelin concert that was cut short by a thunderstorm, leading to an audience riot.

Immediately upon buying the Buccaneers in 1995, new owner Malcolm Glazer declared Tampa Stadium inadequate and demanded that a new facility be built at public expense or he would move the team. Local governments acquiesced, raising sales taxes and constructing Raymond James Stadium directly adjacent to Tampa Stadium. The Big Sombrero was demolished in 1998.

=== Al López Field ===
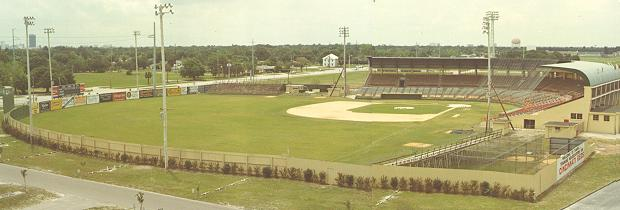
Al López Field in 1979

Al López Field was a spring training and minor league ballpark in Tampa situated at the current location of Raymond James Stadium. It was built in 1954 and named after Al López, the Ybor City native who went on become Tampa's first MLB player and, eventually, a Hall of Fame manager. The ballpark was originally the spring training home of the Chicago White Sox. Coincidentally, Al López became the manager of the White Sox in 1957 and spent several spring trainings at a hometown facility named after himself.

The White Sox moved out and the Cincinnati Reds moved in for 1960. The Reds would use Al López Field and the adjacent training facilities (nicknamed "Redsland") as their spring home for almost 30 years. The Tampa Tarpons, the Reds' Class-A team, played in the ballpark during the summer, and several members of Cincinnati's championship-winning "Big Red Machine" such as Pete Rose. Johnny Bench, and Dave Concepción played some of their first professional baseball in Tampa.

The Reds moved to new facilities in nearby Plant City for spring training 1988. The Tarpons played one more season in the ballpark before it was torn down in 1989. To honor its still-living namesake, the city of Tampa changed the name of a nearby park from "Horizon Park" to "Al López Park".

=== Plant Field ===
Plant Field was the first large spectator sports facility in the area. It was built in 1889 by Henry B. Plant across the Hillsborough River from Tampa as part of his Tampa Bay Hotel resort. As the only facility of its kind in Central Florida, Plant Field hosted a wide variety of events, including auto and horse racing; pro, college, and high school football; and large political events. It was also the long-time location of the Florida State Fair, and the route of the Gasparilla parade would end on Plant Field's track while the fair was in session.

Plant Field was the original home of the minor league Tampa Smokers, the area's first professional baseball team, and was one of the first spring training sites in Florida, hosting several different teams over the decades. During one of the earliest ballgames in April 1919, Babe Ruth reportedly hit his longest home run – a 587-foot blast that is memorialized with a historical marker at the approximate spot where it landed at the current site of the University of Tampa's school of business.

The University of Tampa took over Plant Field in the early 1970s and renamed it Peppin-Rood Stadium after university benefactors. Since then, the school has built new facilities on its huge footprint, including a soccer field (Peppin Stadium), softball and baseball fields, dormitories, and other academic and athletic facilities. While some of the original playing surface is still in use as part of newer venues, the last remaining portions of Plant Field's old grandstand was torn down in 2002.

=== Phillips Field ===
Phillips Field was a medium-sized stadium (maximum capacity approximately 20,000) located just north of Plant Field between Cass Street and the current location of Interstate 275 on the west bank of the Hillsborough River. It served as the home for the University of Tampa's football team from 1936 to 1967 and was named after I. W. Phillips, a local businessman who donated the land to the school so that the Spartans would not have to share Plant Field.

Besides "Tampa U" home games, Phillips Field occasionally hosted other football contests. It was the site of the Cigar Bowl, the area's first college bowl game, from 1946 to 1954, and the Florida Gators scheduled several home games at the facility during the 1930s and 1940s. Phillips Field was also the site of several well-attended NFL preseason contests in the mid-1960s that helped Tampa earn an eventual expansion franchise. And local high school rivalry games which attracted crowds too large for the participants' smaller stadiums were played in Phillips Field until the late 1960s, when newly built Tampa Stadium took over that role.

Phillips Field could also be configured for baseball, and the Tampa Smokers of the Class C Florida International League played most of their home games there from 1946 to 1954.

When Tampa Stadium was completed in 1967, the city gave Plant Field to the University of Tampa, and Phillips Field fell into disuse. It was razed in the early 1970s, and Tampa Preparatory School and Julian Lane Riverfront Park were built at its former location.

=== Curtis Hixon Hall ===
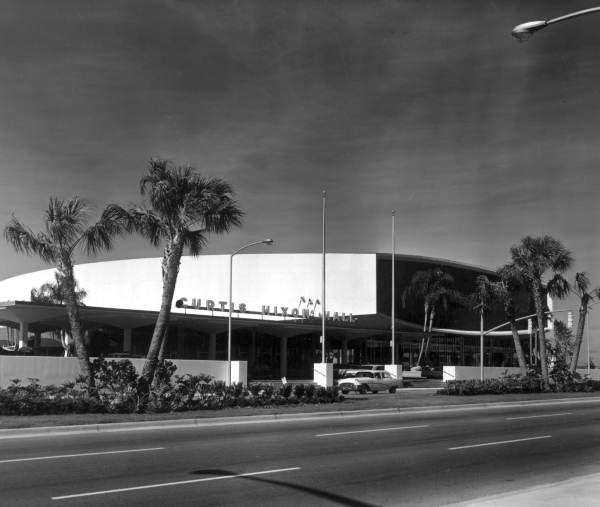
Curtis Hixon Hall in 1965

Curtis Hixon Hall was a multipurpose facility built in 1965 on the banks of the Hillsborough River in downtown Tampa. Along with many concerts. conventions, and special events, Curtis Hixon Hall hosted many professional and amateur boxing and wrestling cards and served as the first home of the University of South Florida's basketball programs and a series of minor league basketball teams.

Curtis Hixon Hall was made obsolete by the construction of newer and larger facilities such as the Ice Palace (now the Benchmark International Arena), the Sun Dome, and the Tampa Convention Center. It was demolished in 1993 and replaced with Curtis Hixon Park. In 2010, a new Tampa Museum of Art and the Glazer Children's Museum opened on the site of the old hall, while a redesigned Curtis Hixon Waterfront Park debuted in adjacent open space.

=== Bayfront Center ===
The Bayfront Center (also known as the Bayfront Arena) was a multipurpose facility along the shores of Tampa Bay near downtown St. Petersburg. Though a little larger than Tampa's Curtis Hixon Hall, it was built in the same year (1965) and hosted a similar mix of concerts, sports, and special events. The Tampa Bay Rowdies played most of their home indoor soccer matches in the facility during the 1980s, and a handful of minor league basketball and hockey teams also called it home. Several nationally televised wrestling and boxing events were held there, along with annual Ringling Bros. and Barnum & Bailey Circus TV specials. The Bayfront Center also hosted some USF men's basketball games throughout the 1970s.

== Traditions ==
=== "Tampa Bay" ===
The name "Tampa Bay" is often used to describe a geographic metropolitan area which encompasses the cities around the body of water known as Tampa Bay, including Tampa, St. Petersburg, Clearwater and several smaller cities. Unlike in the case of Green Bay, Wisconsin, there is no municipality known as "Tampa Bay", and the "Tampa Bay" in the names of local professional sports franchises, such as the Buccaneers, Lightning, Rays, Rowdies, and the former Storm and Mutiny, denotes that they represent the entire region, not just the city of Tampa.

Fans in the area have a popular call-and-response chant that goes beyond just sports and into everyday life. The leader of the chant yells "Tampa" and others respond with "Bay". At games, one side of the stadium or arena will yell each word.

=== Boat parades ===
Since 2020, when a Tampa-based team is crowned as the champions of their league, the team will have a parade of boats down the Hillsborough River in Downtown Tampa rather than a traditional victory parade through the streets like in other cities. This started after the Lightning won the 2020 Stanley Cup and the Buccaneers won Super Bowl LV as a way to celebrate the teams while remaining socially distant in the wake of the COVID-19 pandemic, but was continued after the Lightning won the Stanley Cup again in 2021 even though COVID restrictions had been relaxed. Tampa Bay Sun FC also celebrated with a boat parade after winning the USL Super League in 2025.

== See also ==
- Sports in Florida
