= Miami Rugby Club =

Miami RFC
- Full name: Miami Rugby Football Club, Incorporated
- Union: USA Rugby South Division 2, Florida Rugby Union
- Nickname(s): The Black and Gold
- Ground(s): Tropical Park (Training) and Ron Ehmann Park (Games)
- Coach: (Argentina) Maximiliano Valletti
- Captain: (United States) Rob Lara
- League: USA Rugby South Division 2, Florida Rugby Union
Team kit	Change kit

Miami Rugby Football Club is a rugby union club in Miami, Florida. According to rankings in Rugby Magazine, Miami is amongst the top five clubs in the Southeastern United States. They have regularly won the Florida State Championship. Miami Rugby traces its origin to 1969 when it was founded by Keith Cooksy and Reverend John Howells, the Anglican priest at the University of Miami, who wanted to provide visiting British Royal Navy ships and teams in the Bahamas with competitive rugby. Miami Rugby competes in the USA Rugby South against clubs from Florida, as well as touring African, Argentine, British, French, German, Uruguayan, and West Indies Clubs. Miami Rugby has also toured the Americas.

Miami Rugby players come from all over the globe. Players from Miami Rugby have captained the United States Eagles and represented the Eastern Rugby Union, USA Rugby-South as well as Florida on select side (all-star) teams. Miami Rugby players and “Old Boys” also lend coaching assistance to local universities such as University of Miami and Florida International University. Miami RFC competes in the Premier Division within the Florida Rugby Union and nationally in USA Rugby's Division II. As recently as 2008, Miami Rugby was ranked 19th in the nation by USA Rugby after winning a Florida State Championship. The club started a youth division in 2009.

== Honors ==
- Florida Rugby Union Division 1 titles: 14+
  - 1972, 1973, 1978, 1979, 1979–1980, 1980–1981, 1981–1982, 1982–1983, 1983–1984, 1986–1987, 1994–1995, 1996, 2007–2008, 2010
  - 1991, 2nd Place
  - 2007, Plate Champion
- Florida Rugby Union Division 2* titles: 2+
  - 1981, 2013-2014
- Florida Rugby Union Sevens Championship Series titles: 2+
  - 2013, 2016
- Florida Cup
  - 1972, 1976, 1980, 1982, 1983, 2004, Champions
  - 1973, 1974, 1975, 1978, 2nd Place
- USA Rugby South (fka Eastern Rugby Union Southeastern Region)
  - 1983, 2nd Place
  - 1984, 3rd Place
  - 1987, 2nd Place - 12th in the nation
- Beerfoot Beach 7s
  - 2005, Champions
- Daytona Beach 7s
  - 2013, Champions
- Fort Lauderdale Ruggerfest - (fka Spring Ruggerfest, fka International Rugby Tournament, fka Easter Seals Rugby Tournament)
  - 1983, 1998, Champions
  - 1997, Open Division Champions
  - 1999, Premier Division 2nd Place
- Gold Coast Rugby Tournament
  - 1970, 1971, Champions
- Hurricane 7s
  - 1991, Champions
  - 2000, 3rd Place
- Invasion 7s - Lakewood Ranch
  - 2016, Champions
- Orlando Invitational Rugby Tournament
  - 1999, Champions
- Phillippe "Fiji" Leka Memorial 7s - Miami
  - 2016, Champions
  - 2013, 2nd Place
- St. Patrick's Day Tournament - Savannah, Georgia
  - 1997, Gold Division 2nd Place
- Sarasota Rugby 10-A-Side
  - 1997, Cup Division 1st Place
- Sunshine State Games
  - 2016, Champions
  - 2013, 2nd Place
- Surfin' 7s
  - 2016, Cup Champions
  - 2016, Plate Champions
- Todd Miller 7s - Clermont
  - 2016, Champions
  - 2001, Plate Division 1st Place
  - 1997, Open Cup Division Winner
  - 1997, Open Cup Division Place

(*FRU stopped sanctioning division 1 in 2012)

== Hall of Fame ==
John Clements

Kevin McDonough - 2019

David Kittrell - 2019

AJ Lipstein - 2019

== Presidents ==
Robert Weaver

Dave Williams

Brad Hanafourde

John Clements

Douglas Neary

Mark Tompkins

Ivan Mihovilovic

Frank Henry

Franklyn Williams

Ruben Dario Garcia (2008-2009)

Sergio Chade (2009-2010)

Eduardo Hussey (2010-2012)

Dr. Christian Schlaerth (2012-2017)

Kevin McDonough (2017-2021)

Alfonso Perez Soto (2021-2023)

Ivan Mihovilovic (2023-present)

== Results ==
- As of February 2, 1977: 197 wins and 27 losses
- 1969-1977: 261 wins and 30 losses
- 1978-1979: 37 wins and 7 losses
- 1978-1984: 178 wins and 18 losses
- 1980: 41 wins and 2 losses
- 1969-1981: 349 wins, 39 losses and 5 ties
- 1969-1983: 358 wins and 42 losses

Schedule for 1970:

- Mar 28th vs. HMS Arethusa
- May vs. University of Florida, Gold Coast Rugby Tournament, Won 8-3
- May vs. Freeport, Gold Coast Rugby Tournament, Won 6-3
- Dec 21st vs. University of Georgia

Schedule for 1971:

- Jan 16th vs. Baillou (Nassau)
- Jun 26th vs HMS Ark Royal
- Nov 14th vs. University of Florida Reserves, Orlando
- Dec 4th at Aerowik (Kingston), Lost 16-6
- Dec 5th at Jabaa (Kingston), Won 16-9

Schedule for 1972:

- Jan 8th vs. HMS Phoebe
- Jan 22nd vs HMS Jupiter
- Apr 15th Miami B vs. Nassau + Baillou, Gold Coast Rugby Tournament
- Apr 15th Miami A vs. Pensacola, Gold Coast Rugby Tournament
- Oct 7th at Orlando, Won 20-15
- Oct 28th at Orlando, Cocoa
- Dec 2nd Miami Red vs. Pensacola, Florida Cup, Lost 30-4
- Dec 2nd Miami Black vs. Orlando, Florida Cup, Won 12-9
- Dec 2nd Miami Red vs. University of South Florida, Florida Cup, Lost 16-0
- Dec 2nd Miami Black vs. University of Florida, Florida Cup, Won 20-0
- Dec 3rd Miami Red vs. Jacksonville, Florida Cup, Lost 11-4
- Dec 3rd Miami Black vs. Florida State University - Final, Florida Cup, Won 15-13

Schedule for 1973:

- Feb 23rd vs. Florida State University, Won 19–17; Reserves Won 4-3
- Mar 3rd at Orlando, Won 7-0
- Oct 6th vs. Orlando, Won
- Oct 13th vs. Jacksonville, Won
- Nov 10th vs. University of South Florida, Won 30-14
- Nov 17th at Orlando (14 wins in a row on Nov 16th)
- Dec 15th vs. Trident, Florida Cup, Won 27-0
- Dec 15th vs. University of South Florida, Florida Cup, Won 24-0
- Dec 16th vs. Florida State University - Final, Florida Cup at the Tangerine Bowl, Lost 13-0

Schedule for 1974 (12-2 record for the year):

- Jan 15th vs. Pueyrredón B (Argentina), Won 25-18
- Feb 23rd vs. HMS Fearless, Won 52-11
- Mar 23rd vs. Orlando, Won 26-4
- Sep 14th vs. Trident, Won
- Oct 5th at Orlando, Lost 9-3
- Nov 10th vs. Jacksonville, Won 48-0
- Nov 12th vs. Trident
- Dec 7th vs. University of Florida, Florida Cup, Won 10-6 (3 OT)
- Dec 7th vs. Orlando, Florida Cup, Won 15-6
- Dec 8th vs. Florida State University - Final, Florida Cup at the Tangerine Bowl, Lost 17-12

Schedule for 1975:

- Jan vs. Club Pueyrredón (Argentina), Won
- Mar 2nd vs. HMS Ark Royal, Won 12-9
- Mar 4th vs. HMS Tartar, Won 42-4 (7th straight win)
- Apr 19th vs. Trident
- Sep 17th vs. HMS Nubian, Won 15-6
- Sep 28th at Iron Horse
- Dec 13th vs. Pensacola, Florida Cup, Won 24-0
- Dec 14th vs. University of Florida - Semi-Final, Florida Cup, Won 10-0
- Dec 14th vs. Tallahassee - Final, Florida Cup, Lost 16-6

Schedule for 1976: Fall Season - 1st team 15 wins, 1 loss; 2nd team 7 wins, 3 losses, 1 tie

- Jan 10th vs. Alumni (Argentina)
- Jan 24th at Iron Horse
- Jan 25th at Orlando
- Mar 20th vs. Canadagua (NY) Vikings, Gator Invitational Rugby Tournament
- Jul 3rd vs. HMS Ark Royal, Won
- Sep 4th vs. Old Smugglers 2nd team, FIU 7s Tournament, Won 20-0
- Sep 4th Reserves vs. Trident 2nd team, FIU 7s Tournament, Won 20-3
- Sep 4th 3rd team vs. Old Smugglers 3rd team, FIU 7s Tournament, Won 12-0
- Sep 4th vs. Trident, FIU 7s Tournament, Won 24-0
- Sep 4th Reserves vs. Old Smugglers 2nd team, FIU 7s Tournament, Won 30-0
- Sep 4th 3rd team vs. Old Smugglers 3rd team/Naples, FIU 7s Tournament, Won 16-14
- Sep 4th vs. Old Smugglers, FIU 7s Tournament, Won 28-7
- Sep 4th Reserves vs. Trident, FIU 7s Tournament, Tied 10-10
- Sep 11th vs. Trident, Won 28–3; Reserves Won 18-4
- Sep at Grand Cayman, Won 7-6
- Sep Reserves vs. President's XV in Grand Cayman, Lost 9-7
- Oct 2nd Reserves vs. Old Smugglers Reserves, Won 22-11
- Oct 5th vs. Public School Wanderers (England), Won 16-10
- Oct 8th Reserves vs. Public School Wanderers, Lost 36-10
- Oct 16th Reserves vs. Boca Raton, Won 16-10
- Oct 23rd at Orlando, Won 19-6
- Nov 6th vs. Freeport (Bahamas), Won 25-10
- Nov 7th Reserves vs. Freeport Reserves, Lost 6-4
- Nov 13th vs. Boca Raton, Won 37-0
- Nov 20th at Brevard, Won 41–22; Reserves Won 20-6
- Dec 4th vs. Grand Cayman (Cayman Islands), Won 18-11
- Dec 4th Reserves vs. Boca Raton, Won 25-0
- Dec 5th Reserves vs. Grand Cayman Reserves, Won 26-10
- Dec 11th vs. Jacksonville, Florida Cup, Won 19-4
- Dec 11th vs. Tallahassee, Florida Cup, Won 7-4
- Dec 12th vs. Old Smugglers - Final, Florida Cup, Won 20-0

Schedule for 1977: 45-4 for '76/'77; First American team to win Mandeville 7s Tournament

- Jan 8th vs. Boca Raton, Won 33–4; Reserves Won 32-0
- Jan 15th at Freeport (Bahamas), Won 10-3
- Jan 16th at Freeport, Won 18-0
- Jan 22nd vs. New York Athletic Club, Won 37-15
- Jan 23rd Reserves vs. New York Athletic Club Reserves, Won 13-6
- Jan 25th Reserves vs. Old Smugglers Reserves, Won 16-0
- Feb 1st vs. Sarnia (Canada), Won 28-18
- Feb 3rd Reserves vs. Sarnia (Canada) Reserves, Won 16-6
- Feb 5th at Tampa, Won 23–14; Reserves Won 22-0
- Feb 16th Reserves vs. Princeton Old Boys, Lost 29-13
- Feb 19th vs. Old Blue (NY), Lost 28–22; Reserves Lost 18-10
- Feb 26 at Kingston Reserves, Mandeville All Caribbean 7s Tournament in Jamaica, Won 34-0
- Feb 26 at Montego Bay, Mandeville All Caribbean 7s Tournament in Jamaica, Won 24-0
- Feb 26 at Mandeville, Mandeville All Caribbean 7s Tournament in Jamaica, Won 20-0
- Feb 26 at Arawak, Mandeville All Caribbean 7s Tournament in Jamaica, Won 26-0
- Feb 26 at Kingston - Semi-final, Mandeville All Caribbean 7s Tournament in Jamaica, Won 20-0
- Feb 26 at Mandeville - Final, Mandeville All Caribbean 7s Tournament in Jamaica, Won 16-8
- Mar 1st vs Western Illinois University, Won 66-3
- Mar 3rd Reserves vs Western Illinois University Reserves
- Mar 5th vs. Tampa/University of South Florida, Won 16–7; Reserves Won 12-4
- Mar 8th vs. University of West Virginia, Won 38-3
- Mar 10th Reserves vs. University of West Virginia, Won 74-3
- Mar 12th vs. Orlando, Won 50-0
- Mar 12th Reserves vs. University of Florida, Won 32-24
- Mar 19th at Florida International Tournament in Gainesville
- Mar 22nd vs. Kent State University, Won 24-7
- Mar 26th vs. Iron Horse, Won 47–0; Reserves Lost 25-14
- Apr 1-13 South American Tour
- Apr 2nd Reserves vs. Camp LeJeune Marines
- Apr 16th vs. Jamaican Barbarians
- Apr 23rd at Fort Lauderdale, Won 86-0 *New state scoring record
- Apr 24th Reserves vs Boca Raton, Won 36-6
- Apr 30th Reserves at Boca Raton, All Florida 7s Tournament in Miami, Won 22-0
- Apr 30th at Boca Raton Reserves, All Florida 7s Tournament in Miami, Won 34-0
- Apr 30th Reserves at Winter Park, All Florida 7s Tournament in Miami, Lost 20-0
- Apr 30th at Winter Park, All Florida 7s Tournament in Miami, Won 26-6
- Apr 30th vs. Miami Reserves, All Florida 7s Tournament in Miami, Won 24-6
- Apr 30th Reserves at Trident, All Florida 7s Tournament in Miami, Won 16-4
- Apr 30th at Trident, All Florida 7s Tournament in Miami, Won 30-0
- Apr 30th at Boca Raton, All Florida 7s Tournament in Miami, Won 36-0
- May 3 vs. Oldie Goldies
- May 5 vs. Oldie Goldies
- Sep 3rd vs. Trident - scrimmage
- Sep 10th vs. Old Smugglers, Won 41–3; Reserves Lost 9-7
- Sep 16th vs. HMS Diomede, Won 66-6
- Sep 17th Reserves vs. Trident Reserves, Won 26-3
- Sep 17th 3rd team vs. Boca Raton 1st team, Won 20-9
- Sep 24th at Grand Cayman (Cayman Islands), Won 21–8; Reserves Won 27-9
- Oct 1st vs. Freeport (Bahamas)
- Oct 2nd Reserves vs. Freeport Reserves
- Oct 8th Reserves vs. Fort Lauderdale, Won 36–6; 3rd Team vs Boca Raton, Lost 12-11
- Oct 15/16 at Jamaica National Team in Kingston, Won 19–6; Won 32-22
- Oct 20th Reserves vs. Trident, Lost 22–3; 3rd Team vs. Trident Reserves, Won 20-0
- Oct 22nd Reserves vs. Old Smugglers, Lost 19-11
- Oct 30th vs. Tampa Pelicans, Won 78–15; Reserves too
- Nov 5th Reserves vs. Fort Lauderdale
- Nov 8th vs. Trident
- Nov 12th vs. Brevard
- Nov 19th at Reforma Barbarians (Mexico), Won 42-4c
- Nov 24th Reserves at Atletico de Mexico (Mexico), Won 24-3
- Nov at Mexico National Team, Won 25-12
- Dec 10th vs. Grand Cayman (Cayman Islands)
- Dec 11th Reserves vs. Grand Cayman Reserves
- Dec 17th at Florida Cup

Schedule for 1978: 25-2 and Reserves 20-6 as of Mar 16 for 77/78; 36-6-3 for 77/78

- January 21–22 vs. Velox (Victoria, British Columbia)
- January 27–29 at Freeport
- January 27–29 at Bahamas
- Feb 12-15 vs. Cardinal Newman (Argentina)
- Feb 18th vs. Boston
- Feb 18th at Fort Lauderdale, Won 36-16
- Feb 19th vs. HMS Porpoise, Won 66-6
- Mar 2nd vs HMS Phoebe, Won 94-4
- Mar 4th vs. Tallahassee, Lost 20-17
- Mar 4th Reserves vs. Pennsylvania State University, Won 54-8
- Mar 5th vs. East Carolina University, Won 27–0; 3rd Team, Won 14-0
- Mar 11th Reserves at Tampa
- Mar 11/12 vs. US Niad, Won 44-3
- Mar 11/12 vs. Tallahassee, Won 177-20
- Mar 11/12 Reserves vs. Fort Lauderdale, Won 36-0
- Mar 14th vs. Yale University, Won 48-0
- Mar 21st vs. Nottingham University (England), Won 34-12
- Mar 22nd Reserves vs. Nottingham University, Lost 8-27
- Mar 25th at Freeport Festival
- Apr 8th vs. University of Florida
- Apr 11th vs. Old Illtydians (Wales)
- Apr 13th Reserves vs. Old Illtydians
- Apr 25th vs. United Hospitals (England)
- May 1–6 vs. Blackheath (England), Draw
- May 10 vs. Preston Grasshoppers (England)
- May 20 at Cayman
- June 5–8 vs. Lloyds Bank (England)
- Sep 22nd vs. South Miami RFC
- Oct 5th vs. Trident
- Oct 7th Reserves at Port Charlotte
- Oct 14th at Orlando
- Oct 21st Reserves vs. Pelicans
- Oct 28th vs. Fort Lauderdale
- Nov 4th vs. Freeport (Bahamas)
- Nov 11th vs. Old Smugglers
- Nov 16th at Golden Star (Martinique)
- Nov 18th at St. Lucia National Team
- Nov 18th at Gros Islet RFC
- Nov 25th vs. Chicago Lions
- Dec 9th at Old Smugglers - Final, Florida Cup, Lost 6-3
- Dec 16th vs. Cayman

Schedule for 1979:

- Jan 13th vs Trident, Won 46-6
- Jan 28th vs. San Carlos (Argentina), Won 27-20
- Feb 3rd vs. Ft. Lauderdale, Won 38-0
- Feb 17th at Boca Raton, Won 28-14
- Feb 19th vs. Western Ontario, Won 8-0
- Feb 24th vs Orlando, Won 16-12
- Mar 1st vs. Vancouver Rowing Club, Lost 12-14
- March 3 vs. Boca Raton, Won 30-0
- March 6 vs. Smugglers won 14-0
- March 10 at Tallahassee, Lost 20–14; Reserves Lost 14-0
- Mar 13th vs. Xavier, Won 10–7; Reserves Lost 9-10
- Mar 17th vs. Olivos, Lost 10-12
- Mar 20th vs. Cal State, Lost 0-15
- Mar 21st vs. Beacon Hill, Lost 13-0
- Mar 28th vs. Courtland St., Won 26–0; Reserves Won 10-0
- Apr 12th vs. Rhode Island, Won 24-6
- Apr 14th Reserves at Pelicans - No score, Miami with 9 players
- May 5 at Cayman, Won 15-6 and Won 19-4
- June 2 vs. Moseley (England), Lost
- June 16 vs. Dry Gulch, Won
- Sep 15th vs. Old Gold (Chile)
- Sep 18th vs. Diggers (Zambia), Won 13-12
- Sep 22nd vs. Old Gold (Chile) - 10 Year Reunion Game
- Sep 29th at Pelicans
- Oct 6th vs. Fort Lauderdale
- Oct 13th vs. Old Smugglers
- Oct 20th at Orlando
- Oct 28th vs. Port Charlotte
- Nov 3rd vs. Trident
- Nov 10th at Old Smugglers
- Nov 17th vs. Bay Area - Texas
- Nov at Universidad Autónoma de Santo Domingo (Dominican Republic), Won 22-6
- Nov at Club Jean Paul (Dominican Republic) at Estadio Olimpico Santo Domingo, Won 48-0
- Nov at Dominican Republic National Team at Universidad Nacional Pedro Henríquez Ureña, Won 16-6
- Nov at Universidad Central del Este (Dominican Republic)
- Dec 1st vs. Grand Cayman won 50-4
- Dec 15th vs. HMS won 36-4

Schedule 1980: Florida 7s Champions and Florida Cup Champions - Fall season: 11 games won, 1 lost, and 1 tied

- Feb 9th Reserves at Fort Myers, Lost 12-11
- Feb 16th vs. Trident, Won 21-6
- Feb 16th Reserves vs. Boca Raton, Lost 24-0
- Feb 23rd at Fort Lauderdale, Won 40-6
- Feb 28th Over 30s vs. Huntington, Drew 9-9
- Mar 4th vs. Holy Cross, Won 46-4
- Mar 8th vs. Jacksonville in Clearwater, State Championship, Won
- Mar 11th Reserves vs. Columbia
- Mar 13th Reserves vs. Xavier, Lost 16-4
- Mar 15th vs. Nassau, Won 33-0
- Mar 22nd at Cayman
- Mar 25th Reserves vs. Smugglers, Won 10-6
- Mar 30th vs. Colgate University, Won 20-8
- Apr 3rd Reserves vs. Colgate University, Lost 21-9
- Apr 12 at Louisiana State University, Southern Regionals, Lost 9-8
- Apr 17th vs. West Bridgford (England), Lost
- May 13 vs. Penarth (Wales)
- May 18 vs. Vale of Lune (England)
- Aug 22nd vs. Henley (England)
- Aug 31st 7s at Fort Myers
- Sep 6th Reserves at Port Charlotte
- Sep 13th at Fort Myers
- Sep 13th Reserves vs. Trident
- Sep 20th Reserves vs. Boca Raton
- Sep 27th at Cayman
- Oct 4th at University of Florida
- Oct 4th Reserves at Fort Myers
- Oct 11th Reserves at St. Leo's
- Oct 15th vs. Orange Emus (Australia), Won 36-6
- Oct 18th vs. Smugglers
- Oct 18th Reserves vs. Brevard
- Oct 21st vs. Smugglers, Won 10-9
- Oct 25th at Trident
- Oct 25th Reserves at Fort Lauderdale
- Nov 1st Reserves at Palm Beach
- Nov 4th vs. Mbabalas (South Africa)
- Nov 8th Reserves vs. Smugglers
- Nov 9th vs. Florida Select Side, Won 50-10
- Nov 15th at Boca Raton
- Nov 22nd Reserves at University of South Florida
- Nov 29th vs. Fort Lauderdale
- Dec 6th at Florida Cup
- Dec 6th vs. Cayman
- Dec 13th vs. Grand Cayman

Schedule 1981:

- Jan 1st vs. Sydney Teachers (Australia), Won 56-16
- Jan 24th Reserves vs. Trident Reserves
- Jan 31st vs. Trident, Won 28-3
- Jan 31st Reserves vs. Ft. Lauderdale Reserves, Won 53-0
- Feb 7th vs. Boca Raton, Won 32-3
- Feb 7th Reserves vs. Palm Beach, Won 9-7
- Feb 14th vs. Pelicans; Reserves
- Feb 14th 2nd Reserves vs. Fort Myers
- Feb 21st Reserves vs. Brevard won 48-0
- Feb 28th at Boca Raton, Won 25–0; Reserves Won 25-3
- Feb Reserves vs. Xavier of Ohio, Lost 12-8
- Mar 3rd vs. Rochester Rats
- Mar 7th vs. Manhattan, Lost; Reserves Won
- Mar 14th Florida Championships at FIU Campus in Miami: Won Div. I by Forfeit and won Div. II against Fort Myers 32-0
- Mar 21st won vs. Princeton College
- Mar 22nd and 26th vs. College of London, England at home. Won
- Mar 26th vs. Princeton at home. Aside won 90-0
- Mar 28th vs. Ft. Lauderdale, away. Won A & B sides
- Apr 7th Over 30s vs. Richmond Heavies (England), Won
- Apr 11th at South Regional Championships, Lost 31-0
- Apr 18th vs. Tamworth (England)
- Apr 19th vs. Cardiff (Wales), Won 40-20
- Apr 19th vs. Boca Raton, Won
- Apr 25th at Eastern Finals
- May 2 vs. Pilgrim Fathers (England), Won 11-6
- May 9 vs. Bristol (England), Lost 28-23
- May 15 vs. Northern (England), Won
- May 20 President's XV vs. Bristol (England), Lost
- Aug 24th vs. Bath, Lost 53-6
- Sep 5-7th at Fort Myers' 7s Tournament
- Sep 12th at Orlando; Reserves too
- Sep 19th Reserves at Trident
- Sep 26th Reserves vs. Smugglers
- Oct 9th at Grand Cayman; Reserves too
- Oct 17th at Fort Lauderdale, Won 14-6
- Oct 24th Reserves at Polk Pillagers
- Oct 31st vs. Boca Raton, Won 7-6
- Nov 7th vs. Smugglers, Won 14-13
- Nov 7th Reserves vs. Palm Beach
- Nov 14th vs. Brevard, Won
- Nov 21st at Trident
- Nov 26th Tour to Nassau

Schedule 1982:

- Jan 30th Reserves vs. Fort Myers
- Feb 6th at Iron Horse
- Feb 13th vs. Fort Lauderdale
- Feb 20th at Brevard
- Feb 27th at Boca Raton; Reserves at Palm Beach
- Mar 6th vs. Trident
- Mar 9th vs. Georgetown University
- Mar 10th Over 30s vs. West Chester State College
- Mar 13th State Championship
- Mar 19th vs. Princeton University
- Mar 23-26 vs. Qatar
- Apr 2nd vs. Bucknell
- Apr 3rd vs. Pelicans; Reserves vs. University of South Florida
- Apr 17th vs. Polk
- May 1 at Palm beach
- May 13 vs. Worthing (England)
- Sep 5th Reserves at Fort Myers' 7s Tournament
- Sep 11th vs. Trident, Friendly, Won
- Sep 18th at Fort Myers, Won 8-6
- Sep 25th vs. Trident, Lost 14–8; Reserves vs. Palm Beach, Lost 14-11 - first loss to Trident
- Oct 2nd Reserves vs. Trident, Won 20-0
- Oct 3rd Reserves vs. HMS Broadsword, Won 28-0
- Oct 9th at Fort Lauderdale, 18–8; Reserves won 20-0
- Oct 16th at Palm Beach, Won 34–3; Reserves Won 10-4
- Oct 23rd at Boca Raton, Won 11-3
- Nov 6th Reserves vs. Fort Myers
- Nov 13th at Orlando, Won 13–7; Reserves Won 11-0
- Nov 20th vs. Brevard, Won 37-16
- Nov 27th vs. Pelicans
- Dec 4th Florida Cup

Schedule 1983: State Champions, Regional Runners-Up

- Jan 15th vs. Tridents, Friendly, Won
- Jan 22nd vs. Iron Horse, Won 22–7; Reserves won 14-11
- Jan 29th Reserves vs. Ft. Myers, Lost 21-13
- Feb 1st vs. Boca Raton, Won 36-0
- Feb 5th Reserves at Palm Beach, Tied 16-16
- Feb 12th vs. Ft Myers, Won 41-4
- Feb 19th at Fort Lauderdale, Won 19–12; Reserves won 6-0
- Feb 26th Reserves at Daytona
- Mar 5th at Pelicans, Won 19-10
- Mar 6th Reserves at Tampa, Won
- Mar 12th at Trident, Won 40-4
- Mar 13th vs. University of Pennsylvania, Won 36-3
- Mar 18th vs. University of Rhode Island
- Mar 26th Iron Horse Tournament; Won 12–8, Lost 13–9, Won 8-4
- Apr 2nd vs. University of Florida - Final, State Championship, Won 12-9
- Apr 16th vs. New Orleans, Semi-final, Eastern Rugby Union Southern Regional Championship, Won 37-4
- Apr 17th vs. Atlanta Renegades - Final, Eastern Rugby Union Southern Regional Championship in Miami, Lost 22-18
- Apr 23rd at Virgin Islands, Fort Lauderdale Easter Seals Tournament, Won 33-6
- Apr 23rd at Life Chiropractic College - Semi-final, Fort Lauderdale Easter Seals Tournament, Won 17-6
- Apr 24th at Orlando - Final, Fort Lauderdale Easter Seals Tournament, Won 13-10
- Sep 17th at Palm Beach, Won 33-11
- Sep 24th vs. Orlando, Won 45-9
- Oct 1st vs. Fort Lauderdale, Lost 21-15
- Oct 8th at Brevard, Won 25-10
- Oct 15th vs. Boca Raton, Won 40-16
- Oct 22nd vs. St. Petersburg Pelicans
- Dec 4th vs. Iron Horse - Final, Florida Cup, Won 14-13

Schedule 1984: 29-6 as of April 10, State Champions

- Jan 28th at Trident, Won 15-0
- Feb 4th at Fort Lauderdale, Won 8-4
- Feb 11th vs. Brevard, Won 24-0
- Feb 12th vs. HMS Birmingham, Won 50-0
- Feb vs. Boca Raton, Won 40-0
- Feb 25th vs. University of Florida - Final, State Championship, Won 18-15
- Mar 10th vs. team from Cayman Islands, Won 14-4
- Mar 11th vs. Buffalo State University, Won 48-6
- Mar 24th at a Toronto Club, Iron Horse Tournament, Won 25-0
- Mar 24th at Iron Horse, Iron Horse Tournament, Lost 13-0
- Mar 25th at St. Petersburg Pelicans, Iron Horse Tournament, Lost 13-12
- Apr 5th vs. Scioto Valley (OH), Won 22-0
- Apr 7th at Life Chiropractic College, Fort Lauderdale Rugby Tournament, Lost
- Apr 7th at Scioto Valley, Fort Lauderdale Rugby Tournament, Lost 12-7
- Apr 14th at Atlanta Renegades, Eastern Rugby Union Southern Regional Championship in Atlanta, Lost 9-4
- Apr 15th at Barry (Wales), in Atlanta, Won 19-14
- Sep 9th vs. Cardiff University (Wales), Lost 6-3
- Sep 15th vs. Trident
- Oct 13th vs. Fort Lauderdale, Draw 18-18
- Oct 14th vs. Fort Lauderdale, Lost 34-3
- Nov 3rd vs. Boca Raton, Lost 19-15

Schedule 1985: 1-5 as of October 20; 8-5 for 84/85, 3rd place

- Mar 9th vs. Palm Beach
- Mar vs. Fort Lauderdale, Lost 9-3
- Sep 14th vs. Tampa
- Sep 21st vs. Trident, Lost 36-7
- Oct 12th vs. Fort Lauderdale
- Oct 19th at Boca Raton, Lost 8-6
- Nov 30th at Jamaica Army, Won 30-10
- Dec 1st at Jamaica National Team, Won 50-24

Schedule 1986:

- Jan 25th at Boca Raton, Lost 24-9
- Feb 1st at Trident
- Feb 16th vs. Universidad de Belgrano (Argentina), Won 15-6
- Mar 29th vs. Life Chiropractic College
- Feb 8th vs. Trident
- Sep 20th vs. Trident, Won 49–6; Reserves Won
- Oct 4th vs. Boca Raton, Lost 15–7; Reserves Lost 18-12
- Oct 14th vs. Alexandra Sports Club (Zimbabwe), Lost 19-3
- Oct 18th at Ridge (Lakeland, FL), Lost 9-7
- Nov 1st vs. Fort Lauderdale, Won 18-6
- Nov 8th at Palm Beach, Won 39-9
- Nov 22nd at Brevard - Semifinal, Florida Championship, Won 12-9
- Dec 14th at Orlando

Schedule 1987: 14–3 record as of February 8, 12 in the nation

- Jan 24th at Winter Horse - Semi-final, Won 9-6
- Jan 31st vs. Trident
- Feb 7th vs. Brevard, Won 45–6; Reserves won 18-6
- Feb 21st at Fort Lauderdale, Won 14-7
- Mar 1st vs. Boca Raton, State Finals, Won 18-6
- Apr 11th vs. Fort Lauderdale - Semifinals, Eastern Rugby Union Championship at Life Chiropractic College, Won 20-15
- Apr 12th at Life Chiropractic College - Finals, Eastern Rugby Union Championship at Life Chiropractic College, Lost 28-6
- Oct 3rd vs. Boca Raton, Won
- Oct 17th vs. St. Petersburg Pelicans
- Dec 5th at Orlando, 16th Citrus Bowl Rugby Tournament, Lost 21-3

Schedule 1988:

- Feb 26th vs. University of Michigan
- Feb 27th Florida Club Championship
- Mar 3rd vs. San Isidro U23 (Argentina), Won
- Mar 5th Fort Lauderdale Tournament, Lost
- Mar 15/16 vs. Yale
- Mar 19th vs. Ridge
- Mar 26th vs. Jacksonville
- Apr 2nd at Fort Lauderdale
- Apr 3rd vs. Pubside (England)
- Apr 9th vs. Trident
- Apr 16th vs. Brevard
- Apr 20/21 vs. Muscat (Oman)
- Apr 26th vs. Muscat
- Jun 18 vs. Toulouse (France)
- Sep 10th at Brevard
- Sep 24th at University of Florida
- Sep 25th at Jacksonville
- Oct 1st vs. Boca Raton
- Oct 15th at Trident
- Oct 22nd vs. Fort Lauderdale
- Oct 29th at Fort Myers
- Nov 5th at Pelicans
- Nov 12th vs. Iron Horse
- Nov 19th at Palm Beach
- Dec 3rd Citrus Bowl Tournament

Schedule 1989:

- Jan 21st at Orlando
- Jan 30th at Trident
- Feb 4th vs. Pelicans
- Feb 11th vs. Boca Raton
- Feb 18th at Iron Horse
- Feb 25th vs. Tucumán Juniors (Argentina)
- Mar 4th at Fort Lauderdale
- Mar 11th vs. Space Coast
- Mar 25th vs. Barnet (England)
- Apr 1st vs. Fort Myers
- Apr 8th Tournament in Jamaica
- Apr 19th vs. Brüggen Bears (Germany)
- Apr 22nd vs. Brevard
- May 6 vs. Preston Grasshoppers (England)
- May 8 vs. Preston Grasshoppers
- May 20 vs. Llantrisant (Wales)
- Jun 3rd Miami Group IV 7s Tournament
- Aug 20th vs. Old Freemen's (England)
- Sep 2nd Fort Myers 7s
- Sep 16th vs. Iron Horse, Won 25-6
- Sep 23rd vs. Trident; Reserves too
- Sep 30th at Boca Raton; Reserves too
- Oct 7th vs. Fort Lauderdale; Reserves too
- Oct 14th vs. West Palm; Reserves too
- Oct 21st Florida Rugby Union Club Championships, Clearwater
- Oct 28th at Florida State University; Reserves too
- Nov 4th vs. University of Florida; Reserves too
- Nov 18th at Brevard
- Nov 18th Reserves vs. University of Central Florida at Brevard
- Dec 2nd Citrus Bowl Tournament

Schedule 1991:

- Oct 20th vs. Fort Lauderdale, State Championship, Lost 21-10

Schedule 1993:

- Oct 30th at Orlando, Florida State Championships semifinal

Schedule 1995:

- Feb 25th vs Dallas, Fort Lauderdale International Ruggerfest Tournament
- Feb 15th vs BATS, Fort Lauderdale International Ruggerfest Tournament

Schedule 1999:

- Feb 14th at Fort Lauderdale, Fort Lauderdale International Ruggerfest, Won 36-6
- Feb 14th vs St. Petersburg Pelicans, Fort Lauderdale International Ruggerfest, Lost 12-5

Schedule 2000:

- Feb 19th at Durban Harlequins, Fort Lauderdale's 24th International Rugby Tournament, Lost 10-6
- Feb 19th at College Select Side, Fort Lauderdale's 24th International Rugby Tournament, Won 16-9
- Feb 20th at Washington Irish, Fort Lauderdale's 24th International Rugby Tournament, Won 13-5

Schedule 2002:

- Jan 12th vs. Tridents Won 31-18
- Jan 26th vs. Tridents Lost 5-13
- Feb 2nd vs. Fort Lauderdale Won 22-10
- Feb 9th vs. Orlando Lost 19-34
- Feb 16th vs. Fort Lauderdale tied 13-13
- Feb 23, 24 vs. Chicago Lions, Premier Division, Fort Lauderdale International Ruggerfest, Lost 43-13
- Feb 23, 24 vs. Boca Raton, Premier Division, Fort Lauderdale International Ruggerfest, Won 25-0
- Mar 2nd vs. Orlando Won 10-30
- Mar 9th vs. Pelicans Won 39-22
- Mar 16th vs. Boca Raton, home
- Mar 23rd vs. Pelicans, home
- Apr 6th vs. Boca Raton, away

Schedule 2004:

- Dec vs. Trident - Final, Florida Cup, Won 27-20

Schedule 2008:

- Feb at Naples Hammerheads, Won 36-32
- Feb vs. Boca Raton, Won
- Nov 8th vs. University of Florida, Lost 26-19

Schedule 2009:

- Sep 12th vs. Fort Lauderdale, home, won 40-0
- Sep 19th vs. Tridents, away, Won 17-19
- Sep 26th vs. Brevard, home, Won 46-7
- Oct 17th vs. Boca Raton, Florida Cup, Lost 41-7
- Oct 24th vs. Florida International University, away, Won 5-40
- Nov 1st vs. Marista Rugby Club Mendoza U19, home, Lost 15-17
- Nov 24th vs. Tridents, home, Won 33-10
- Dec 5th vs. Boca Raton, away, Lost 23-17
- Dec 12th vs. Naples, home, Won 26-3

Schedule 2010:

- Apr 10th vs. Atlanta Renegades - Semifinal, USA Rugby South Championship in Miami

Schedule 2011-2012:

- Oct 15th at Naples, Lost 28-7
- Dec 10th vs. Pelicans, Won 45-0
- Jan 21st at Naples, Lost 15-0
- Feb 25th vs. Austin Blacks, Fort Lauderdale Ruggerfest, Lost 25-0
- Feb 25th vs. Cincinnati Wolfhounds, Fort Lauderdale Ruggerfest, Lost

Schedule 2012-2013 (0-9 in FRU DII):

- Nov 3rd vs. Naples, Lost 52-3
- Nov 10th at Fort Lauderdale, Lost 30-20
- Nov 17th at Trident, Lost 23-22
- Dec 1st vs. Boca Raton, Lost 57-6
- Dec 15th at Naples, Lost 29-28
- Jan 5th vs. Fort Lauderdale, Lost 16-14
- Jan 12th vs. Trident, Lost 34-27
- Jan 19th at Boca Raton, Lost 29-11
- Feb 9th vs. Orlando, Lost 38-14
- Feb 23rd vs. Boston Irish Wolfhounds, Fort Lauderdale Ruggerfest, Won 24-0
- Feb 23rd vs. Fort Myers, Fort Lauderdale Ruggerfest, Won 44-5
- Feb 24th vs. University of Minnesota - Duluth - Final, Fort Lauderdale Ruggerfest, Lost 17-16
- Jul 6th vs. Sarasota, Phillippe "Fiji" Leka Memorial 7s, Won 24-15
- Jul 6th vs. FIU - Semi-final, Phillippe "Fiji" Leka Memorial 7s, Won 24-5
- Jul 6th vs. Daytona Beach - Final, Phillippe "Fiji" Leka Memorial 7s, Lost 33-21

Schedule 2013-2014 (11-1 in FRU DII):

- Nov 16th vs. Naples, home, Won 44-12
- Jan 18th vs. Fort Lauderdale, Won 30-8
- Apr 12th vs. Fort Lauderdale - Final, Clermont, Won 37-10

Schedule 2014-2015 (2-2 in Florida Cup, 1-1-8 in FRU DII):

- Dec 6th vs. Jacksonville, Lost 27-36
- Dec 13th at Naples Hammerheads, Lost 36-17
- Jan 10th vs. Tampa Bay Krewe, Won 29-19
- Jan 17th vs. Boca Raton Buccaneers, Lost 22-24
- Jan 31st at Trident, Lost 16-10
- Feb 7th vs. Fort Lauderdale, Lost 12-31
- Feb 28th vs. Naples Hammerheads, Draw 0-0
- Mar 7th vs. Orlando, Lost 14-59
- Mar 21st at Orlando, Lost 101-7
- Mar 28th at Boca Raton Buccaneers, Lost 83-10

Schedule 2015-2016 (0-10 in FRU DII):

- Oct 3rd at Boca Raton, Lost 54-17
- Oct 17th vs. Brevard, Lost 24-13
- Oct 24th vs. Palm Beach, Won 40-24
- Nov 7th at Tallahassee, Won 34-29
- Dec 12th at Fort Lauderdale, Lost 36-24
- Dec 19th vs. Jacksonville, Lost 32-12
- Jan 9th at Tridents, Lost 76-5
- Jan 16th vs. Fort Lauderdale, Lost 43-22
- Jan 23rd vs. FIU (friendly), Won 31-14
- Jan 30th at Jacksonville, Lost 33-31
- Feb 6th vs. Naples, Lost 44-22
- Feb 6th Reserves vs. Harvard Business School (friendly), Lost 27-7
- Feb 13th vs. Boca Raton, Lost 27-26
- Feb 13th Reserves vs. FIU (friendly), Lost 70-17
- Feb 27th at Orlando, Lost 43-36
- Mar 5th at Tampa, Lost 29-17
- Mar 12th vs. Tridents, Lost 39-17
- Jun 11th vs. Naples - Final, Sunshine State Games Cooper City, Won 29-0
- Jun 18th vs. Okapi Wanderers, Phillippe "Fiji" Leka Memorial 7s Miami, Won
- Jun 18th vs. Palm Beach Panthers, Phillippe "Fiji" Leka Memorial 7s Miami, Won
- Jun 18th vs. Orlando - Semi-final, Phillippe "Fiji" Leka Memorial 7s Miami, Won 31-0
- Jun 18th vs. Naples - Final, Phillippe "Fiji" Leka Memorial 7s Miami, Won 57-5
- Jun 25th vs. Brevard - Semi-final, Todd Miller 7s Clermont, Won
- Jun 25th vs. Orlando - Final, Todd Miller 7s Clermont, Won 50-5
- Jul 9th vs. University of South Florida, Invasion 7s Lakewood Ranch, Won
- Jul 9th vs. Naples - Final, Invasion 7s Lakewood Ranch, Won 26-0

Schedule 2017:

- Feb 18th vs Boca Raton, Lost 31-5
- Mar 4th vs Boca Raton, Won 41-12
- Mar 18th vs. Jacksonville, Lost 63-38

Schedule 2018 (2-6 in FRU DII, 3–1 in Florida Cup):

- Jan 20th at Tridents, Lost 29-5
- Jan 27th vs. Okapi Wanderers, Won 59-39
- Feb 10th vs. Jacksonville, Lost 48-34
- Feb 17th vs. Tridents, Lost 59-19
- Feb 24th at Okapi Wanderers, Won 69-29
- Mar 10th at Tampa Bay Krewe, Lost 68-28
- Mar 17th vs. Fort Lauderdale, Lost 59-21
- Mar 24th at Boca Raton, Lost 32-19
- Jun 23rd vs. University of South Florida, Surfin 7s West Palm Beach, Won 33-0
- Jun 23rd vs. Neptunes, Surfin 7s West Palm Beach, Lost 26-10
- Oct 6th vs. Florida Atlantic University, Won 28-14
- Nov 10th vs. Trident, Florida Cup, Lost (forfeit)
- Nov 10th vs. Columbus, Battleship Rugby Invitational Tournament, Won
- Nov 10th vs. Baton Rouge, Battleship Rugby Invitational Tournament, Lost
- Nov 11th vs. August, Battleship Rugby Invitational Tournament, Won (forfeit)
- Nov 17th vs. Palm Beach Panthers, Florida Cup, Won
- Dec 1st at Indian River, Florida Cup, Won (forfeit)
- Dec 8th at Fort Lauderdale, Florida Cup, Won (forfeit)
