= Plant Field =

Athletic venue in Tampa, Florida

Coordinates: 27.948524°N 82.46710°W

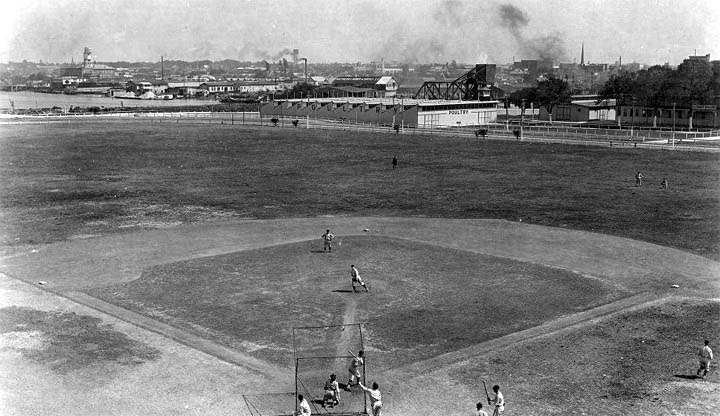
- The stadium during a baseball game in 1923
- Interactive map of Plant Field
- Former names: Pepin-Rood Stadium (1971–2002)
- Address: Tampa, FL; United States
- Owner: Tampa Bay Hotel (1899–1900); City of Tampa (1900–1971); University of Tampa (1971–2002)
- Type: Multi-purpose stadium
- Surface: Grass

Construction
- Opened: 1899
- Demolished: 2002; 24 years ago

Tenant
- List: Spring Training: Chicago Cubs (1913-16); Boston Red Sox (1919); Washington Senators (1920-1929); Detroit Tigers (1930); Cincinnati Reds (1930-1959); Chicago White Sox (1954); Minor leagues: Tampa Smokers (1919–1930; 1946–1954); College Sports: Tampa Spartans (1933-36); High school sports: Hillsborough High School (1920s); Professional teams: Tampa Cardinals (1926)

Plant Field was the first major athletic multi-purpose stadium in Tampa, Florida. It was built in 1899 by Henry B. Plant on the grounds of his Tampa Bay Hotel to host various events and activities for guests, and it consisted of a large field ringed by an oval race track flanked by a large covered grandstand on the western straightaway with portable seating used to accommodate a wide variety of uses. Over the ensuing decades, Plant Field drew Tampa residents and visitors to see horse racing, car racing, baseball games, entertainers, and politicians. The stadium also hosted the first professional football and first spring training games in Tampa and was the long-time home of the Florida State Fair.

Al Lopez Field opened in 1954 and Tampa Stadium opened in 1967, and they became the preferred venues for most of the events that had long been held at Plant Field. The adjacent University of Tampa gained ownership of the facility in 1971, and with Tampa Spartans football games moving to Tampa Stadium and the Florida State Fair moving to a much larger site east of downtown in 1976, Plant Field was primarily used for university events and student recreation.

The university began to gradually convert much of the venue's large footprint to other uses in the 1970s. Much of the seating areas and the race track were removed and several academic buildings and student housing facilities built in their place, while the last portion of the Plant Field grandstand renamed Pepin-Rood Stadium in 1983. The original grandstand was demolished and replaced with smaller modern bleachers in 2002, and much of the original playing field has been incorporated into multiple new venues for the university's athletic programs.

== History ==
In 1885, the railroad line of Henry B. Plant reached Tampa, connecting the small town to the nation's railroad system for the first time and helping to stimulate rapid growth and development. Plant's company primarily shipped goods such as cigars and citrus from the area, but to encourage passenger travel, he built several hotels in the greater Tampa Bay area, jump starting the region's tourist industry. The largest of these hotels was the Tampa Bay Hotel, a lavish resort containing over 500 rooms which opened across the Hillsborough River from downtown Tampa in 1892. The resort offered many amenities to visitors, including horse riding facilities on the western side of the resort grounds which included a simple track. These facilities were greatly enlarged and expanded in 1899 and become Plant Field, which was large enough to host a wide variety of sports and other activities.

The Tampa Bay Hotel closed in 1931. The new University of Tampa took over most of the facilities in 1933, though the city of Tampa retained control of Plant Field.

=== Racing ===
Henry Plant built a horse track on the grounds east of North Boulevard and south of Cass Street, now the site of the University of Tampa athletic fields. During the 1898-99 tourist season, races were sponsored by the Tampa Agricultural Racing and Fair Association. When automobile races were added to the South Florida Fair in 1921, the horse track was converted into a 1/2 mile dirt oval that operated until 1980. Plant Field was also a venue for dirt-track races sanctioned by the International Motor Contest Association until the mid-1970s

=== Baseball ===
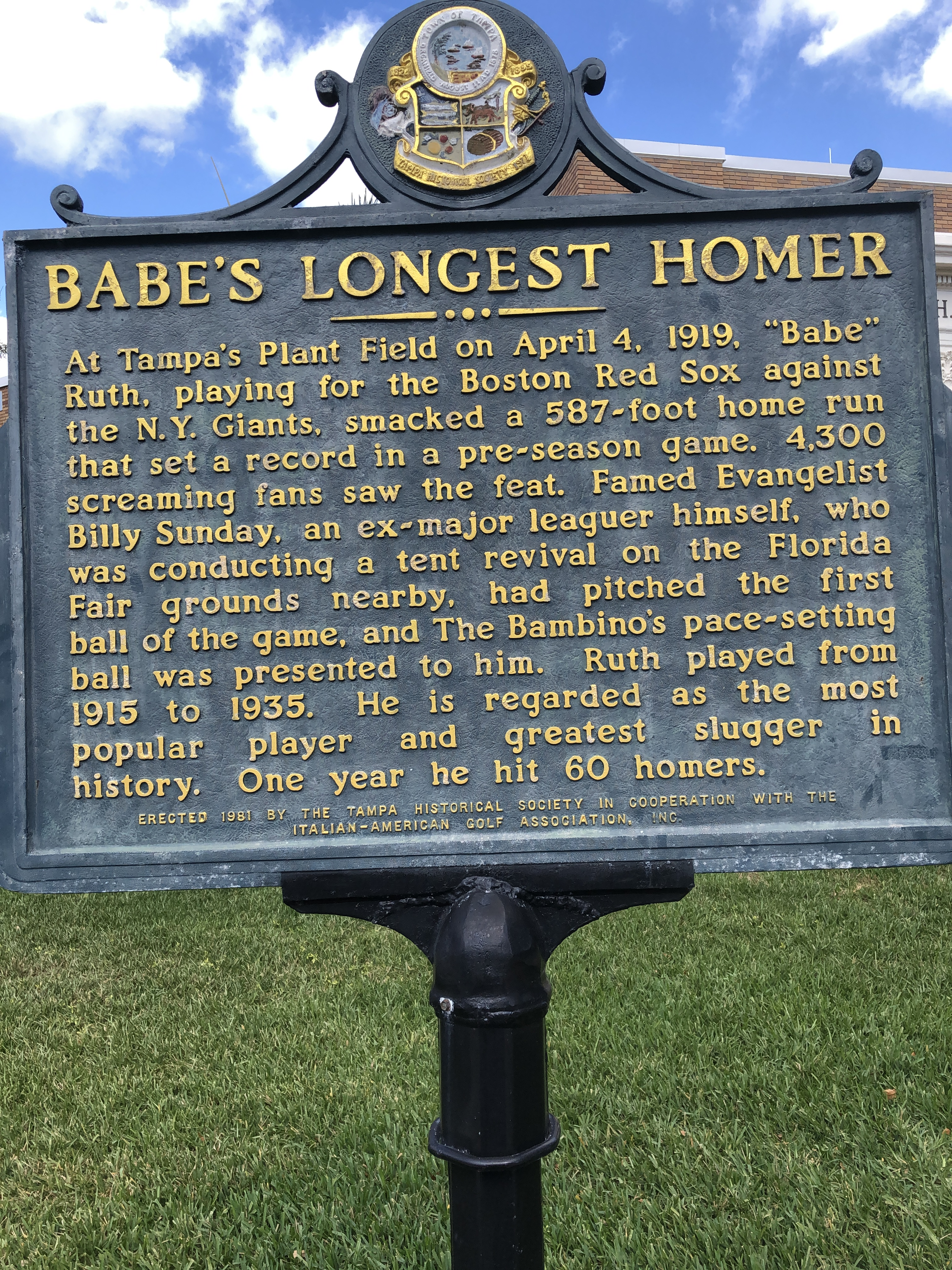
Babe Ruth hit a 587 foot home run at Plant Field on Friday April 4, 1919

Baseball began at Plant Field around 1899 when local teams played at what was then called the Tampa Bay Race Track Diamond. With the lure of travel incentives offered by the city government, it became one of the first facilities used by Major League Baseball for spring training when the Chicago Cubs came to train before the 1913 season. The Cubs conducted spring training in Tampa until 1916. On March 26, 1914, Plant Field hosted the first major league baseball spring training game in the Tampa Bay area when the Cubs defeated the St. Louis Browns 3–2.

After the Cubs departed, the Boston Red Sox used the facility next. On April 4, 1919. Babe Ruth, playing in what would be his last season with the Red Sox, hit a home run 587 feet against the New York Giants during an exhibition game. A plaque remains to commemorate Ruth's achievement as it was considered the longest home run of Ruth's career and one of the longest in baseball history.

Over the years, Plant Field was the spring home to many major league teams, including the Washington Senators in the 1920s, the Detroit Tigers in 1930, and the Cincinnati Reds in the 1930s, 40s & 50s. The Chicago White Sox were Plant Field's last new spring training tenant. They used the facility in 1954 and moved to newly built Al Lopez Field in West Tampa for 1955.

The facility also hosted many minor league, semi-pro, high school, and other baseball games. In November 1950, the Jackie Robinson All-Stars played a local black semi-professional team, the Tampa Rockets, at Plant Field. Robinson's team included major-leaguers Roy Campanella and Larry Doby as well as several Negro league players. Plant Field was the regular home field of the Tampa Smokers of the Florida State League and the Florida International League until the team disbanded after the 1954 season.

=== Football ===
On New Year's Day 1926, the Chicago Bears, led by Red Grange, defeated the Tampa Cardinals, a traveling pick-up team featuring Jim Thorpe, 17–3. This game marked the first professional football game played in Tampa. A number of other exhibition games involving professional and college players were played at Plant Field through the decades.

Due to the small capacity of their first on-campus home of Fleming Field, the Florida Gators football team usually scheduled one or two "home" games per season at Plant Field in the early years of the program, especially when facing top college opponents that drew larger crowds. The construction of Florida Field in 1930 reduced the number of Florida football games in Tampa, though the Gators would occasionally schedule "home" games at Plant Field, Phillips Field, or (much later) Tampa Stadium into the 1980s.

The University of Tampa Spartans played their home football games at Plant Field from 1933 until 1936, when they moved to nearby Phillips Field, which they did not have to share with other tenants. Henry B. Plant High School and Hillsborough High School played their annual rivalry game at Plant Field for decades, usually on Thanksgiving Day. A few other high-interest high school football games were also played at the facility from year to year.

=== Other activities ===
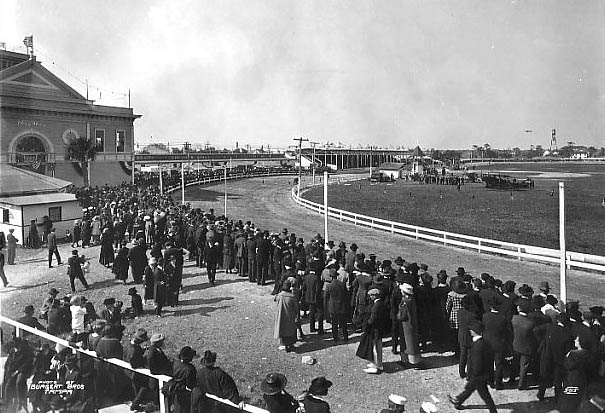
View of the stadium and its athletics track in 1920

For decades, Plant Field was the location of the South Florida Fair, the precursor to the Florida State Fair. The fair was almost always scheduled to coincide with Tampa's annual Gasparilla Pirate Festival, and the Gasparilla Parade ended at the Plant Field grandstands from 1905 until 1976.

In 1912, "Buffalo Bill" Cody performed on the field with hundreds of American Indians who traveled with him as part of his show. When Tampa hosted the national reunion of the United Confederate Veterans in 1927, some of the veterans stayed in quarters under the Plant Field grandstands.

Presidential candidate Henry Wallace spoke at Plant Field in February 1948. Wallace insisted that the audience be integrated. This marked the first political speech in Tampa during which blacks and whites could mix. Paul Robeson sang at another integrated Wallace rally at Plant Field later that October.

During the 1952 Presidential Campaign, Dwight D. Eisenhower appeared at Plant Field.

== Change of ownership and demolition ==
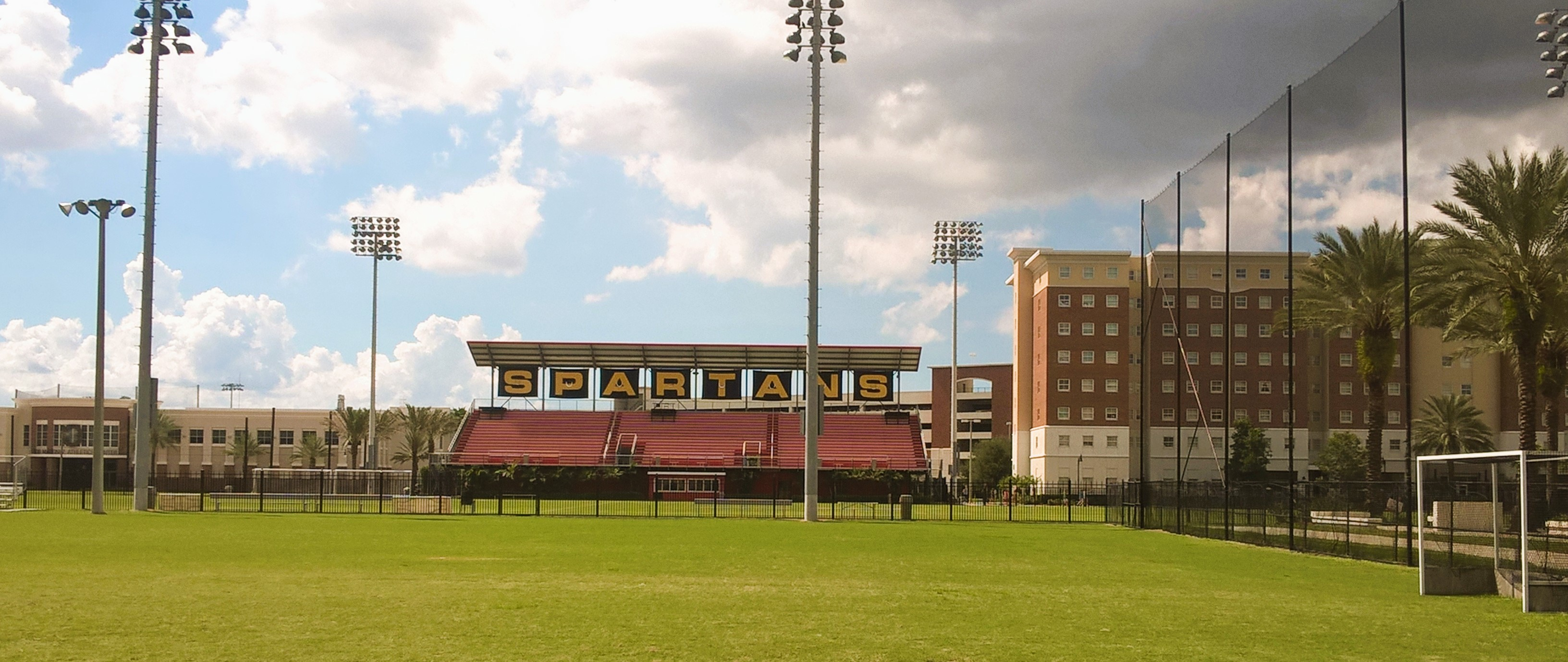
Pepin-Rood Stadium in 2016. The current grandstand was built on the approximate site of Plant Field's original grandstand

Plant Field slowly became obsolete as more specialized sports facilities were built around Tampa. Nearby Phillips Field hosted University of Tampa and the Cigar Bowl football games beginning in the 1930s, and both Plant and Phillips Fields were made obsolete by the construction of Tampa Stadium in 1967. Brand-new Al Lopez Field became the new home of the minor league Tampa Tarpons when they began play in 1957. And in 1977, the Florida State Fair moved to a more spacious location at the intersection of Interstate 4 and U.S. Highway 301 in unincorporated Hillsborough County, east of Tampa.

The University of Tampa Spartans football program moved to Tampa Stadium immediately upon its completion in 1967, making university-owned Phillips Field obsolete. In 1971, the University of Tampa Board of Trustees sold Phillips Field and gained ownership of Plant Field from the city, as the large facility was directly adjacent to the school's campus.

Over the following decades, the university used Plant Field for various school and community events while gradually repurposing some of the land, and the surrounding concrete wall and much of the seating area were demolished and replaced with new facilities in several stages. In 1983, a soccer pitch-sized section of the field was portioned off and christened Pepin-Rood Stadium, and in 2002, the last remaining section of the Plant Field grandstand was torn down and replaced with smaller modern bleachers.

Since then, the school has accelerated its drive to expand inside the defunct venue's huge footprint. Dormitories and academic buildings have been constructed at the site along with a soccer field (Pepin Stadium), softball and baseball fields, and other athletic and general student recreation space, most of which use the remaining portions of the original playing surface.

== See also ==
- Sports in the Tampa Bay Area
- Baseball in the Tampa Bay area
