= Florida Rugby Union =

Organization

Florida Rugby Union Geographical Union
- Abbreviation: FRU
- Formation: 1974
- Region served: Florida, United States
- President: Dr. Kerri O'Malley
- Website: www.FloridaRugby.org

Founded by six clubs in 1974, the Florida Rugby Union (FRU) is a Geographical Union (GU) that governs the Florida peninsula for USA Rugby. The FRU has four divisions: Men's, Women's, Collegiate Men's, and Collegiate Women's.

== Men's clubs ==
There are currently twenty-one registered voting clubs in the Men's division.

- Bay Area Pelicans
- Boca Raton Buccaneers
- Brevard Old Red Eye
- Central Florida Claymores
- Daytona Beach Coconuts
- Fort Lauderdale Knights
- Gainesville Hogs
- Jacksonville
- Key West
- Miami
- SWFL Hammerheads
- Ocala
- Okapi Wanderers
- Orlando Griffins
- Palm Beach Panthers
- Sarasota Surge
- South Florida
- Tallahassee
- Tampa Bay Krewe
- Trident
- Treasure Coast Armada

== Women's clubs ==
There are currently four registered voting clubs in the Women's division.

- Jacksonville
- Fort Miami
- Orlando
- Tampa

== Collegiate Men's clubs ==
There are currently twelve registered voting clubs in the Collegiate Men's division.

- Ave Maria University
- Eckerd College
- Florida Atlantic University
- Florida International University
- Florida State University
- Millenia Atlantic University
- Saint Thomas University
- University of Central Florida
- University of Florida
- University of Miami
- University of North Florida
- University of South Florida

Previous clubs have included Florida Gulf Coast University.

== Collegiate Women's clubs ==
There are currently nine registered clubs in the Collegiate Women's division.

- University of Florida
- Florida State University
- Florida Atlantic University
- Saint Thomas University
- University of Miami
- University of South Florida
- University of Central Florida
- Florida International University
- Eckerd College

Previous clubs have included Florida Gulf Coast University.

== Leadership ==
=== President ===
- John Clements (1974-77)
- Bill Crusselle (1977-78)
- Kevin Kitto (1978-82)
- Jim Millar (1984)
- Bing Towne (1993-1995)
- Brian Brantley (1996-1998)
- Ken Simmons (2000-2002)
- Mark Etue (2003-2006)
- John Devonport (2007-2010)
- Franklyn Williams (2011-2013)
- Dr. Kerri O'Malley (2014–2022)
- Richard Comisky (2022–2024)
- Dr. Kerri O'Malley (2024–Present)

=== Vice president ===
- Peter Gibson (1974)
- Vic Langley (1996)
- Richard Elliott (1996, 2000)
- Brad Hanafourde (2000)
- Ian Henry (2019–2022)
- Jessica Premet (2019–2023)
- Mary Leigh Miller (2019–2023)
- Gonzalo Michanie (2022-2023)
- Kirk Swanner (2023-Present)
- Jennifer Fasano (2023-Present)
- James Woollcombe-Clarke (2023-Present)
- Michael Williams (2023-Present)
- Michael Gomez (2023-Present)

=== Secretary ===
- Roy Brewer (1974)
- James Bledsoe (1979)
- Joy Striepe (1996)
- Kevin Kitto (2000)
- Richard Comisky (2019–2021)
- Melissa Butler (2022–2023)
- Jennifer Joyce (2023-Present)

=== Treasurer ===
- Roy Brewer (1974)
- Dr. Stuart Roath (1996)
- Gerrardo Ferraris (2000)
- Steve Mommaerts (2005)
- Matthew Tierney (2019)
- Kiel McAuley (2020–2021)
- Dr. Jean-Marie Van Der Elst (2023)
- Patrick Murphy (2024-Present)

=== President Emeritus ===
- Dr. Kerri O'Malley (2022–2023)

== See also ==
- Rugby union in the United States
