= Jacksonville Rugby Football Club =

Jacksonville RFC
- Full name: Jacksonville Rugby Football Club
- Union: Florida Rugby Union
- Founded: 1972
- Ground(s): Adolph Wurn Park, Jacksonville
- President: Patrick Murphy
- Coach(es): Patrick Murphy, Donald Alexander, Daniel Kyle Van Driesen
- League: USA Rugby Division III
Team kit

Official website
- www.facebook.com/jaxrugby

Jacksonville Rugby Football Club (Jacksonville RFC) are a men's rugby union team based in Jacksonville, Florida. They are members of the Florida Rugby Union, the organizational body for rugby in the state of Florida, and currently play in USA Rugby Division III. The club was founded in 1972.

The team currently holds weekly open practices on Monday and Wednesday evening's (From 7:00-8:30pm) at Adolph Wurn Park Park in Jacksonville, FL. All home matches are held at Plantation Sports Complex in Fleming Island, FL.

All current team updates are posted to the team socials: Facebook,Instagram

== History ==
Jacksonville RFC was founded in 1972. The original roster largely consisted of former college rugby players and a handful of locals. Among their biggest events in the early years was playing in front of 50,000 spectators as part of the events surrounding the 1989 Gator Bowl. After years of sporadic success, the team established itself in the 1990s under a string of British coaches, winning the 1996 state championship and going to the national championship. More recently they have made the Florida Cup finals, won the Florida matrix, and played in the National Final 8. In 2008 they won the USA Rugby South Division II Championship, and played in the national Final 16, ultimately finishing sixth in the country out of the 1,300 Division II teams.

The club has been involved with a variety of other rugby teams including assisting founding Jacksonville Women's Rugby Club, Jacksonville Youth Rugby Club, and players have played with the Jacksonville Axemen.
