= Bay Area Pelicans =

(United States) Pelican Rugby
- Full name: Bay Area Pelican Rugby Football Club
- Union: USA Rugby
- Nickname(s): Pelicans, Pelis
- Founded: 1977
- Location: St. Petersburg, Florida
- Ground: Jack Puryear Park
- League: Florida Rugby Union
Team kit

Official website
- www.pelicanrugby.com

Bay Area Pelican Rugby Football Club, commonly known as Pelican Rugby or the Pelicans, is a rugby union club based in St. Petersburg, Florida, in the Tampa Bay area. Founded in 1977, the club is affiliated with USA Rugby and competes in the Florida Rugby Union.

The club has two competitive men's teams, with the First XV competing in Florida Rugby's Division 2 and the Second XV competing in Division 3.

== History ==
Pelican Rugby was established in 1977 in the Tampa Bay area. The club describes itself as one of the oldest rugby clubs in the area and has maintained a men's rugby program for decades.

In addition to competitive rugby, the club has developed social, Old Boys and youth programs. Its Old Boys program is known as the Pelidactyls.

== Competition ==
Pelican Rugby's senior men's program consists of two competitive sides. The First XV competes in Division 2, while the Second XV competes in Division 3.

== Home ground ==
Pelican Rugby's home ground is Jack Puryear Park in St. Petersburg, Florida. The park is located at 5701 Lee Street Northeast, St. Petersburg, Florida 33703.

== Gulf Coast 7s ==
Pelican Rugby hosts the Gulf Coast 7s, a rugby sevens tournament held at Jack Puryear Park in St. Petersburg.

The tournament is part of the Florida Rugby Union's summer sevens series. The 2026 tournament was scheduled for June 20 at Jack Puryear Park and featured men's and women's qualifier and open divisions.

The tournament's published rules provide separate men's and women's competitions, pool play and knockout stages. Men's and women's qualifying divisions use roster and eligibility requirements established for the tournament.

== Club programs ==
In addition to its senior men's teams, Pelican Rugby has social members, an Old Boys program and a developing youth program.

The Old Boys team, known as the Pelidactyls, provides an avenue for former and veteran players to remain involved with the club.

== See also ==
- Rugby union in the United States
- USA Rugby
- Florida Rugby Union
- Rugby union in Florida
