= Trident (Miami) Rugby Football Club =

(United States) Trident RFC
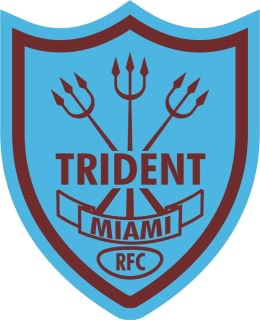
- Full name: Trident Rugby Football Club
- Union: USA Rugby
- Nickname: Tridents
- Founded: 1972; 54 years ago
- Location: Miami, FL
- Ground: Athalie Range Park
- President: (Trinidad and Tobago) Jose Bermudez
- Coach: (Greece) Dimitri Efthimiou
- Captain: (Argentina) Fede Torres García
- League(s): Florida Rugby Union, Premier Division

Official website
- www.miamitridentsrugby.com

The Trident Rugby Football Club is a Miami, Florida based men's rugby union team. Since its founding in 1972, Trident has been one of the preeminent Miami rugby club. Admitted in 1973, Trident competes within the Florida Rugby Union and currently fields a competitive top division team as well as a developmental team. In 2024 the Miami Trident's joined the American Rugby Premiership, which is the top Club Rugby competition in the US.

Following an undefeated 2015/16 regular season, winning by an average margin of 30 points per game (a Florida Rugby Record), the Tridents entered the Florida Rugby Playoffs as the top seed. A 72-10 semifinal win over Jacksonville secured the Tridents a berth in the State Finals against Naples RFC. On April 16, at the state rugby championship in Wellington, FL, the Tridents defeated Naples 28 to 0 to become the State of Florida Top Division Champions. Since then the Miami Tridents have gone on to win Florida State Championships in 2016, 2017, 2018, 2019, 2020* (cough, top of the league, no playoffs), 2021, 2023, and 2024 in the Florida Premier Division. Notably, the Miami Tridents won the 2024 Division 2 National Championship, and due to this accomplishment were eligible to compete in the American Rugby Premiership (ARP) and USA Rugby's Division 1. Due to aggressive lobbying at the administrative and coaching level, this year if we win the Florida Rugby Union (FRU), the Miami Tridents will have the privilege to compete against Charlotte, NC for the D1 qualifier. Winner of the match will compete at the 2025 USA Club Rugby D1 Men's XV Final Four and National Championships.

== History ==
The Trident Rugby Football Club was founded in 1972, by a group of players from the University of Miami Men's Rugby club. The UM rugby club, formed three years earlier, had grown too large, and the lack of playing time prompted these players to meet in 1972 to establish their own, independent club; Trident RFC.

The Tridents' first match was in the summer of 1973 against the rugby team of HMS Ark Royal, a warship of the Royal Navy that regularly called at the Port of Miami. The Tridents lost the contest 0 to 15. That same autumn, the Tridents played in their first divisional match, a winning effort against Naples RFC. Subsequently, the Tridents lost their second divisional fixture to UM RFC and ended their inaugural season 1-1.

On Wednesday, September 7, 2016, the Miami-Dade Mayor Carlos Gimenez alongside Commissioner Jose "Pepe" Diaz recognized the team following an undefeated season by proclaiming September 7 "Trident Rugby Football Club Day" in Miami-Dade County. A great honor that was followed by the first ever lineout performed inside City Hall.

2024 DII Men's Club Rugby XV National Champions. The Tridents defeated Oceanside Chiefs 38–10 in the championship match held in Round Rock, Texas. This was the second trip to the National Championship final 4, and the first national title for the Miami Tridents. MVP of the match was #10 Fran Perello.

Today, the Tridents continue to play rugby in Miami as a member of the Florida Rugby Union.

== Tours ==
Bahamas - 1978

== Practices ==
During regular season, usually October through April, practices are held at Athalie Range Park in the City of Miami Tuesdays and Thursdays at 7:30PM – 9:30 PM.

== Matches ==
Home matches are typically played on Saturdays at 2pm throughout autumn, winter, and spring. A current schedule of matches is published on the club's website.

== Sponsors ==
The Tridents Sponsorship List

South Florida ENT Associates

KE & S LATAM Business Law

Golod Group

CREI Holdings

Weller Yachts

The AuldDubliner
