= Bob Martinez Sports Center =

Multi-purpose arena in Tampa, Florida

Coordinates: 27°56′49″N 82°28′8″W

- Location in Florida Location in the United States
- Former names: Spartan Sports Center
- Location: Tampa, Florida
- Owner: University of Tampa
- Capacity: 3,432

Construction
- Opened: July 1984

Tenants
- Tampa Spartans (NCAA Division II SSC) (1984–present); Tampa Bay Thrillers (CBA) (1985–1986)

Bob Martinez Sports Center is a 3,432-seat multi-purpose arena in Tampa, Florida named after former Tampa mayor and governor of Florida, Bob Martinez.

The facility is home to the University of Tampa Spartans men's and women's basketball teams, as well as the Spartans volleyball team. The Spartan Sports Center, as it was then known, hosted the Continental Basketball Association's Tampa Bay Thrillers for their 1985–86 season. It was also the planned home of the Tampa Bay Strong Dogs of the American Basketball Association, but the team folded without playing a game in Tampa. The facility is on the University of Tampa campus across the Hillsborough River from downtown Tampa and was opened in 1984.
