= Tampa Bay Thrillers =

Professional sports franchise

- Leagues: CBA
- Founded: 1984
- Folded: 1987 (relocated)
- History: Tampa Bay Thrillers; 1984–1987; Rapid City Thrillers; 1987–1995; Florida Beach Dogs; 1995–1997; Rapid City Thrillers; 1998–1999
- Arena: Bayfront Center (1984–85), (1986–87); Spartan Sports Center (1985–86)
- Location: Tampa Bay Area, Florida
- Team colors: Black, Silver, White
- General manager: Sandy Smith
- Head coach: Bill Musselman
- Ownership: John Tuschman
- Championships: 3 (1985, 1986, 1987)
Home	Away

The Tampa Bay Thrillers were a franchise in the Continental Basketball Association (CBA) from 1984–1987. They won back-to-back championships in 1984–85 and 1985–86. At the end of the 1986–87 CBA regular season the team relocated to Rapid City, South Dakota, and went on to win a third consecutive CBA title.

== History ==
=== 1984–85 season ===
In the team's inaugural season, head coach Bill Musselman led the Thrillers to a 35-13 record with a roster featuring Coby Dietrick, Sidney Lowe, Brian Martin, Freeman Williams, Ronnie Valentine, Charles Jones, and Perry Moss. With an advertising budget somewhere between $50,000 and $100,000, the team set a regular season record of 2,946 fans per game that first year. Their cheerleaders were called the Thrillseekers, and dressed in top hats, tails and long black stockings. The Thrillers' original owner was Jeff Rosenberg, a Sarasota restaurateur, who marketed the team heavily.

In the postseason, Tampa Bay swept the Lancaster Lightning in the first round (3–0) and disposed of the Albany Patroons (3–2) before getting by the Detroit Spirits, 4–3, in the CBA championship series, for which Williams earned MVP honors. (All results are expressed in games won.) The team played its home games at the Bayfront Center in St. Petersburg, Florida.

=== 1985–86 season ===
Because of a lease dispute during the off-season, Rosenberg moved the Thrillers' 1985–86 home games to the University of Tampa's Spartan Sports Center, a 4,200-seat venue built in 1984, but their regular season attendance dipped to an average of 1,339. With Musselman at the helm, Tampa Bay posted a CBA-best 34–14 record. That season, Thrillers guard Kevin Williams scored 58 points in a game against the Baltimore Lightning. Ten days later, he had a 59-point effort in a playoff game against the Patroons. The Thrillers became the first CBA team to win back-to-back titles, as they dispatched the La Crosse Catbirds in five games.

=== 1986–87 season ===
In 1986–87, the Thrillers moved back to the Bayfront Center and had another outstanding season, albeit with a new owner, John Tuschman, head of Fidelity Management Company, which owned and operated residential communities. In January 1987 after only a few games and dreadful attendance, as low as 295, Tuschman announced that he would seek to relocate the franchise. He then went on to blame the St. Petersburg Times newspaper for not properly featuring the Thrillers with cover stories on the sports page. However the team's general manager, Sandy Smith, revealed that the 1986–87 advertising budget was approximately $30,000 –well below the figures spent in previous seasons. In a bizarre development, the franchise moved out of Florida at the end of the regular season, and became the Rapid City Thrillers. That did not stop the team from another championship run, which ended in a five-game triumph over the Rockford Lightning. The Thrillers were the only franchise in CBA history to ever achieve a three-peat.

The Rapid City Thrillers would continue in both the CBA and International Basketball Association until 2001.

== Players ==
- Coby Dietrick
- Don Collins
- Les Craft
- Dwan Chandler
- Steve Hayes
- Rod Higgins
- Rick Lamb
- Sidney Lowe
- Brian Martin
- Sam Mitchell
- Ed Nealy
- Linton Townes
- Freeman Williams
- Kevin Williams

== Year-by-year ==
Year	League	Arena	Location	Record	Reg. season	Playoffs	Avg Attend.
1984–85	CBA	Bayfront Center	St. Petersburg	35–13	2nd, Eastern	Champions	2,946
1985–86	CBA	Spartan Sports Center	Tampa	34–14	1st, Eastern	Champions	1,339
1986–87	CBA	Bayfront Center	St. Petersburg	34–14	1st, Eastern	Champions	
