= University of Miami Rugby Football Club =

Collegiate rugby team in Coral Gables, Florida, US

University of Miami
- Full name: University of Miami Rugby Football Club
- Union: USA Rugby
- Nickname: Hurricanes
- Location: Coral Gables
- Region: Florida
- Ground: University of Miami Intramural Fields
- President: Brandon McGowan
- Coach: G Ferraris
- League: Division 2
Team kit

The University of Miami Rugby Football Club is the rugby union club of the University of Miami in Coral Gables, Florida. The University of Miami Rugby team competes in the USA Rugby South against other rugby clubs in Florida and has played teams outside of Florida, including in the Bahamas and in other Caribbean nations.

== History ==
The club was formally founded in 1989 as an all student sport for students at the University of Miami. Rugby was played in Florida first in 1969 and at that time rugby was new and only a handful of students ever played for the local Miami Rugby Football Club. In 1989 Franklyn Williams, a decorated player from the men's team formed the club of all students and began to teach rugby football. Prior to 1989 the University of Miami became famous throughout the world by playing and beating travelling teams from South America, England, Wales, Ireland, Scotland, France, Germany, Australia and many other Division 1 clubs from the rest of the world.

== Players ==
The Hurricanes are made up of students of the university, though players from other countries occasionally have played for the club while enrolled as students at the University of Miami. The team relies primarily on talent from within the United States, many of whom did not compete in rugby prior to college. Despite this, the program regularly produces Collegiate Select Side players for the Florida Rugby Union and several players have been invited to the USA Rugby South selection camp. The players within the club come from all over the United States, and some have competed previously in other rugby unions. Several players have played for professional clubs on a part-time or full-time basis, including for the San Francisco Golden Gate Rugby Football Club and the Chicago Griffins. The team competed in the Battleship Tournament, a national tournament, finishing second to Louisiana State University.

== Club honors ==
- Florida Rugby Union, Florida Cup Semi-finalists in 2010
- Battleship Tournament, Runner-up in 2010
- Florida Rugby Union, Florida Cup Semi-finalists in 2008
- Florida Rugby Union Florida Cup Runner-up in 1995

== Philanthropy ==
The University of Miami Rugby team is actively involved philanthropically in the Miami metropolitan area community, including:

- Volunteering at Hard Rock Stadium during Miami Hurricanes football home games;
- Working every year at a local Renaissance Festival; and
- Co-participating with the University of Miami Women's Rugby Team in Relay for Life.
