= Freeport F.C. =

LFA First Division football club in Montserrado County, Liberia

- Full name: Freeport Football Club
- Nickname: Go Green
- Founded: March 14, 2011
- Ground: Antoinette Tubman Stadium; Monrovia, Liberia
- Capacity: 10,000
- Chairman: Allen Nyonno
- Manager: Wesley Gbotoe
- League: Liberian First Division
- 2025–26: Liberian First Division, 14th of 14

Freeport Football Club is a football club from Liberia based on the Bushrod Island in Montserrado County. The club plays in the LFA First Division.

== History ==
=== Early history ===
The club was founded on March 14, 2011, and started playing in the Liberia Football Association Logan town sub-committee third division league and became champions of the Logan town sub-committee third division in 2015. In 2017, the club won the Liberia Football Association Montserrado County Sub-Association third division championship and got promoted to the Liberia Football Association second division league.

=== Promotion To The Top Tier ===
The club gained promotion to the top tier of Liberian football after spending just a year in the second tier. They finished third in on the 2019 Liberia Football Association second division table and got promoted to the Liberia Football Association first division along with FC Bea Mountain. The club played in the Liberian top tier for the first time during the 2019–20 LFA First Division. The club became title contenders in their debut year as they challenged for the top of the league table and reached the last eight of the Liberian FA Cup before the season got canceled due to the Coronavirus pandemic. They were sixth on the league table before the cancellation of the league.

== Current squad ==
As of 10 November 2020

Note: Flags indicate national team as defined under FIFA eligibility rules; some limited exceptions apply. Players may hold more than one non-FIFA nationality.

No.	Pos.	Nation	Player
1	GK	LBR	Jacob Sackor
2	MF	LBR	Daniel Koffa
3	DF	LBR	William Kollie
4	MF	LBR	Elliott Suah
5	DF	LBR	Terrence Gbollie
6	MF	LBR	Simon Krah
7	FW	LBR	David Wesseh
8	MF	LBR	George Yarkpawolo
9	FW	LBR	Kevin Kromah
10	MF	LBR	Edward Zayzay
11	FW	LBR	Jimmy Flomo
12	DF	LBR	Abraham Tamba
14	MF	LBR	Bruce Yakpah
15	FW	LBR	Desmond Gbotoe

No.	Pos.	Nation	Player
16	DF	LBR	Justin Mulbah
18	MF	LBR	Waylon Gbaa
19	FW	LBR	Stephen Kromah
20	FW	LBR	Elijah Zogbaye
21	DF	LBR	Raymond Wulu
22	MF	LBR	Ronald Vah
23	DF	LBR	Ernest Momolu
25	FW	LBR	Theophilus Jallah
26	DF	LBR	Connor Gono
27	FW	LBR	William Tugbe Jr.
28	FW	LBR	Troy Mawolo
30	GK	LBR	Cyrus Binda

== Technical staff ==
Position	Staff
First team head coach	Wesley Gbotoe
Deputy coach	Barnabas Kromah
Trainer	Daniel Mulbah
Team Manager	Anthony Yakpah
Kit Man	Eugene Wesseh
Medic	Kyle Sackor
