= Tampa Rockets =

Floridian baseball team

The Tampa Rockets were a baseball team that played in the Florida State Negro League in the 1940s. Notable players that played for the Rockets include Walter Lee Gibbons and Raydell "Bo" Maddix. Both of them went on to play for the Indianapolis Clowns of the Negro American League.
