= Tampa Bay Krewe =

Tampa Bay Area Krewe
- Full name: Tampa Bay Area Krewe; Rugby Football Club
- Union: Florida RFU
- Founded: 1991; 34 years ago
- Ground(s): Skyview Park, Tampa

Official website
- krewerugby.com

The Tampa Bay Krewe, or Krewe Rugby, are a rugby union team based in the Tampa Bay Area of Florida. They are members of the Florida Rugby Union, the organizational body for rugby union in Florida, and Division II side in USA Rugby, plus a youth side and a social side. Krewe Rugby was founded in 1991 by ten Tampa Bay area professionals who had previously been members of different novice to semi-professional level rugby union teams. The Krewe plays other Division- II Rugby Clubs from cities across Florida, including Jacksonville, Orlando, Naples, Boca Raton, Fort Lauderdale, and Miami.

The Krewe is one of the Florida Rugby Union's most successful clubs, with its various teams having brought home several state and regional titles, including the 2009 Florida Cup and USA Rugby Division II Championships. The Tampa Krewe won the 2010 USA Rugby Division II National Championship, and returned to the USA Rugby Division II National Championship Finals match to take on the New Orleans Rugby Club in 2011. In 2013, the Tampa Krewe defeated the Naples Hammerhead Rugby Club 31–29 to win the Division II Florida Cup Championship.

== Championships ==
- Tampa Bay Krewe Division III team - 1997 Florida Cup Champion.
- Tampa Bay Krewe Division III team - 2008 Florida Cup Champion.
- Tampa Bay Krewe Division III team - 2009 Florida Cup Champion.
- Tampa Bay Krewe Division II team - 2009 Rugby South Champion.
- Tampa Bay Krewe Division II team - 2010 National Champion.
- Tampa Bay Krewe Division II team - 2010 Florida Cup Champion.
- Tampa Bay Krewe Division III team - 2010 Florida Cup Champion.
- Tampa Bay Krewe Division II team - 2010 National Champion.
- Tampa Bay Krewe Division II team - 2011 National Finalists
- Tampa Bay Krewe Division II team - 2013 Florida Cup Champions
- Tampa Bay Krewe Division II team - 2022 Florida Cup Champions

== Tampa Krewe Hall of Fame ==
In 2018, Tampa Krewe Rugby inducted their first Hall of Fame class, consisting of 5 Inductees.

2018 Inductees

- Michael “Goody” Goodwin
- Eric Saunders
- Roge Ramirez
- Thomas “Rusty” Harwood
- Greg “Spenner” Svengard
