= List of professional sports teams in West Virginia =

West Virginia is the 39th most populated state in the United States and has a rich history of professional sports.

== Active teams ==
Arena football
League	Team	City	Stadium	Capacity
AAL	Wheeling Miners	Wheeling	WesBanco Arena	5,406
Baseball
League	Team	City	Stadium	Capacity
ALPB (Ind.)	Charleston Dirty Birds	Charleston	GoMart Ballpark	4,500
Ice hockey
League	Team	City	Arena	Capacity
ECHL	Wheeling Nailers	Wheeling	WesBanco Arena	5,406

=== Map of cities with a professional sports team ===
Location with a professional sports team

== See also ==
- Sports in West Virginia
