= Gerald Dockery =

American football player and coach (born 1970)

Profile
- Positions: Wide receiver, defensive back

Personal information
- Born: August 17, 1970 (age 56)
- Listed height: 6 ft 1 in (1.85 m)
- Listed weight: 219 lb (99 kg)

Career information
- High school: Worthing (Houston)
- College: Eastern New Mexico
- NFL draft: 1993: undrafted

Career history

Playing
- Calgary Stampeders (1995)*; Texas Terror (1996); Grand Rapids Rampage (1998–1999); Houston ThunderBears (2000–2001)
- * Offseason or practice squad member only

Coaching
- Katy Ruff Riders (2007–2010) Head coach; Houston Stallions (2011–2012) Head coach; Corpus Christi Fury (2016) Offensive coordinator, assistant head coach & director of player personnel; Georgia Doom (2018)
- Stats at ArenaFan.com

Gerald Dockery (born August 17, 1970) is an American former professional football player who played five seasons in the Arena Football League (AFL) with the Texas Terror, Grand Rapids Rampage and Houston ThunderBears. He played college football at Arizona Western College and Eastern New Mexico University.

== Early life and college ==
Gerald Dockery was born on August 17, 1970. He attended Worthing High School in Houston, Texas. Dockery was inducted the school's wall of fame in 2022.

Dockert played college football at Arizona Western College from 1989 to 1990 and Eastern New Mexico University from 1991 to 1992.

== Professional career ==
Dockery signed with the Calgary Stampeders of the Canadian Football League in 1995. On June 15, 1995, it was reported that he had been released.

Dockery played in eight games for the Texas Terror of the Arena Football League (AFL) in 1996, recording 16 receptions for 220 yards and four touchdowns, 22 solo tackles, and three assisted tackles. He was a wide receiver/defensive back during his time in the AFL as the league played under ironman rules.

He played in all 14 games for the Grand Rapids Rampage of the AFL in 1998, totaling 42 catches for 584 yards and seven touchdowns, 28 solo tackles, 19 assisted tackles, one forced fumble, two fumble recoveries, two interceptions, 11 pass breakups, and three kick returns for 32 yards. The Rampage finished the 1998 season with a 3–11 record. Dockery appeared in only four games in 1999, and did not record any statistics.

Dockery played in all 14 games for the Houston ThunderBears of the AFL in 2000, recording 48 receptions for 604 yards and 11 touchdowns, 17 solo tackles, six assisted tackles, and six pass breakups. Houston went 3–11 that year. Dockery appeared in two games the next year in 2001, catching two passes for ten yards while also posting one solo tackle and one assisted tackle.

== Coaching career ==
Dockery served as head coach of the Katy Ruff Riders from 2007 to 2010 and was head coach of the Houston Stallions from 2011 to 2012. He was the offensive coordinator of the Corpus Christi Fury in 2016. In 2018, he joined the Georgia Doom as the team's offensive coordinator and assistant head coach. After head coach Derek Stingley left the team in May 2018, Dockery became the team's new head coach and defeated the league-leading Richmond Roughriders in his first game. The Doom went on to defeat both the top teams in the American Arena League before the Doom were suddenly withdrawn from playoff participation despite being the third seed. Dockery left the Doom after the season.
