= Robert Kent (quarterback) =

American gridiron football player and coach (born 1980)

No. 36
- Position: Quarterback

Personal information
- Born: October 6, 1980 (age 46); Greenville, Mississippi, U.S.
- Listed height: 6 ft 4 in (1.93 m)
- Listed weight: 235 lb (107 kg)

Career information
- High school: Gentry (Indianola, Mississippi)
- College: Jackson State
- NFL draft: 2004: undrafted

Career history
- Tennessee Titans (2004)*; Montreal Alouettes (2005)*; Birmingham/Alabama Steeldogs (2006–2007); Lubbock Renegades (2007); Toronto Argonauts (2007); Lubbock Renegades (2008); Oklahoma City Yard Dawgz (2008–2009); Abilene Ruff Riders (2010); Houston Stallions (2011–2012); Corpus Christi Fury (2013); San Antonio Talons (2013); Corpus Christi Fury (2014); St. Louis Attack (2014); Texas Revolution (2015–2017); Dallas Marshals (2017–2018); Monterrey Steel (2017); Massachusetts Pirates (2018); Richmond Roughriders (2018); Texas Revolution (2019); Duke City Gladiators (2019); North Texas Bulls (2021); San Antonio Gunslingers (2022); North Texas Bulls (2024)*
- * Offseason or practice squad member only

Awards and highlights
- CIF MVP (2016); CIF Offensive Player of the Year (2016)

Career AFL statistics
- Comp. / Att.: 6 / 17
- Passing yards: 98
- TD–INT: 0–1
- QB rating: 31.00
- Rushing TDs: 1
- Stats at ArenaFan.com
- Stats at CFL.ca (archive)

Robert Kent (born October 6, 1980) is an American professional football quarterback. He played college football for the Jackson State Tigers. He has been a member of the Tennessee Titans, Montreal Alouettes, Birmingham/Alabama Steeldogs, Lubbock Renegades, Toronto Argonauts, Oklahoma City Yard Dawgz, Abilene Ruff Riders, Houston Stallions, Corpus Christi Fury, San Antonio Talons, St. Louis Attack, Texas Revolution, Dallas Marshals, Monterrey Steel, Massachusetts Pirates, Richmond Roughriders, Duke City Gladiators, North Texas Bulls, and San Antonio Gunslingers. He also was the head coach of the Duke City Gladiators in the Indoor Football League (IFL) for part of the 2021 season.

== Early life ==
Robert Kent was born on October 6, 1980, in Greenville, Mississippi. He played high school football for the Gentry High School Rams of Indianola, Mississippi. He earned All-State honors as a senior, throwing for 2,883 yards and 30 touchdowns. He also lettered in track, basketball and tennis.

== College career ==
Kent was a four-year starter at quarterback for the Jackson State Tigers of Jackson State University. In 45 games, he completed 825 of 1539 passes for 11,797 yards, 104 touchdowns and 58 interceptions, averaging 262.16 yards per game. His 11,797 yards passing ranked fourth in NCAA Division I-AA history. Kent was a finalist for the Conerly Trophy in 2002. He participated in the final Blue–Gray Football Classic in 2003.

== Professional career ==
Kent was rated the 18th best quarterback in the 2004 NFL draft by NFLDraftScout.com.

Pre-draft measurables
Height	Weight	40-yard dash	10-yard split	20-yard split	20-yard shuttle	Three-cone drill	Vertical jump	Broad jump
6 ft 4 in (1.93 m)	222 lb (101 kg)	4.90 s	1.65 s	2.83 s	4.22 s	7.69 s	26 1/2 in (0.67 m)	9 ft 2 in (2.79 m)
All values from NFL Combine

=== Tennessee Titans ===
Kent signed with the Tennessee Titans of the National Football League (NFL) on April 26, 2004 after going undrafted in the 2004 NFL Draft. He was released by the Titans on August 29, 2004.

=== Montreal Alouettes ===
Kent signed with the Montreal Alouettes of the Canadian Football League (CFL) in January 2005. He was released by the Alouettes on June 17, 2005.

=== Birmingham/Alabama Steeldogs ===
Kent played for the Birmingham/Alabama Steeldogs of the af2 from 2006 to 2007. He completed 44 of 88 passes for 462 yards and five touchdowns in three games for the Steeldogs in 2007. He also rushed for 65 yards and three touchdowns.

=== Lubbock Renegades (first stint) ===
Kent was traded to the Lubbock Renegades in April 2007. He completed 240 of 427 pass attempts for 3,535 yards, 81 touchdowns and 14 interceptions. He also rushed for 11 touchdowns on 174 yards.

=== Toronto Argonauts ===
Kent signed with the Toronto Argonauts of the Canadian Football League (CFL) on August 6, 2007. He dressed in two games for the Argonauts but did not record any statistics. He was released on August 30, 2007.

=== Lubbock Renegades (second stint) ===
Kent played for the Lubbock Renegades during the 2008 af2 season. He helped the team to its first playoff berth while completing 274-of-505 passes for 4,100 yards, 86 touchdowns and 8 interceptions. He was also the team’s second leading rusher with 189 yards and 16 touchdowns.

=== Oklahoma City Yard Dawgz ===
Kent signed with the Oklahoma City Yard Dawgz in October 2008 and played for them during the 2009 af2 season.

=== Abilene Ruff Riders ===
Kent signed with the Abilene Ruff Riders of the Indoor Football League in April 2010.

=== Houston Stallions ===
Kent played for the Houston Stallions from 2011 to 2012. He recorded a 19–1 record while starting for the Stallions.

=== Corpus Christi Fury (first stint) ===
Kent signed with the Corpus Christi Fury of the Ultimate Indoor Football League in February 2013. He helped the Fury advance to the Ultimate Indoor Football League championship game in the team’s inaugural season. He also led the Ultimate Indoor Football League in passing and led the Fury in rushing during the 2013 season.

=== San Antonio Talons ===
Kent signed with the San Antonio Talons on July 25, 2013. He started one game for the Talons during the 2013 season.

=== Corpus Christi Fury (second stint) ===
Kent re-signed with the Fury and played for the team during the 2014 UIFL season.

=== St. Louis Attack ===
Kent also played for the St. Louis Attack of X-League Indoor Football during the 2014 season. The Attack finished the regular season undefeated and lost to the Florida Marine Raiders in X-Bowl I.

=== Texas Revolution (first stint) ===
Kent signed with the Texas Revolution of Champions Indoor Football (CIF) in 2014 and played for the team during the CIF's inaugural season in 2015. He was named the 2016 CIF MVP and Offensive Player of the Year. He was released on March 23, 2017.

=== Dallas Marshals ===
On March 23, 2017, Kent signed with the Dallas Marshals of Champions Indoor Football (CIF).

=== Monterrey Steel ===
On June 3, 2017, Kent signed with the Monterrey Steel of the National Arena League (NAL).

=== Massachusetts Pirates ===
On April 19, 2018, Kent signed with the Massachusetts Pirates of the National Arena League (NAL).

=== Richmond Roughriders ===
Kent later signed with the Richmond Roughriders of the American Arena League (AAL) in 2018.

=== Texas Revolution (second stint) ===
Kent signed with the Texas Revolution of the CIF to start the 2019 season.

=== Duke City Gladiators ===
Kent signed with the Duke City Gladiators of Champions Indoor Football (CIF) for the rest of the 2019 season.

=== North Texas Bulls (first stint) ===
Kent signed with the North Texas Bulls of the American Arena League (AAL) for the 2021 season.

=== San Antonio Gunslingers ===
On April 27, 2022, Kent signed with the San Antonio Gunslingers of the National Arena League (NAL).

=== North Texas Bulls (second stint) ===
On September 22, 2023, Kent signed with the North Texas Bulls, who were now part of the National Arena League (NAL). However on February 16, 2024, The Bulls' membership to the NAL was revoked, thus making Kent a free agent.

== Personal life ==
Kent was the stunt double for Dwayne Johnson in The Game Plan.
