= Dallas Bulls =

American Arena Football Team

Logo

General information
- Founded: 2021
- Headquartered: Fair Park Coliseum in Dallas, Texas
- Colors: Blue, black, white
- DallasBulls.com

Personnel
- Owner: Dr. C.S Hudson
- Head coach: Victor Mann

Team history
- North Texas Bulls (2021–2024); Dallas Bulls (2025–present)

Home fields
- Fort Worth Convention Center (2021–2022); Fair Park Coliseum (2025–present)

League / conference affiliations
- American Arena League (2021); Arena Football Association (2022); National Arena League (2026)

Championships
- League championships: 1: AAL: 2021
- Conference championships: 1: AAL: 2021
- Division championships: 1: AAL: 2021

Playoff appearances (1)
- AAL: 2021

The Dallas Bulls are a professional indoor football team based in Dallas, Texas, established in 2021 in Fort Worth as the North Texas Bulls. In their inaugural season, they secured the national championship within the American Arena League (AAL). The team later played in the National Arena League.

== History ==
North Texas Bulls (2021-2024)

=== American Arena League (2021) ===
The North Texas Bulls started in the American Arena League. Under the leadership of Head Coach Victor Mann and front office management of Jordan Lott, they secured the AAL national championship, defeating teams including the Charlotte Thunder and the San Antonio Gunslingers.

=== Arena Football Association (2022) ===
The team transitioned to the Arena Football Association the subsequent year. However, were removed after only one game.

=== National Arena League (2023–2024) ===
On September 27, 2023, the North Texas Bulls made an announcement confirming their move to the National Arena League (NAL). On February 17, 2024, the league announced that they had terminated the membership of the Bulls without the Bulls playing a single game.

=== New beginning (2025-future) ===
The Bulls were rebranded as the Dallas Bulls for 2025 and beyond and are rumored to be joining Arena Football One. As of January 13, 2025 - Dallas has a chance of becoming an AF1 team as it was announced the Wichita Regulators would sit out until 2026. Because of this the league has 11 teams if Dallas joins they will be 12. The AF1 did not authorize this claim and has consistently warned teams seeking to join the league to not prematurely announce any association with AF1. AF1 instead contracted the Wilkes-Barre/Scranton Mavericks to bring the league to an even 10 teams.

On August 13, 2025, the Bulls were announced to have once again joined the National Arena League replacing the departed Beaumont Renegades and becoming the third expansion team in the league for 2026 joining the Amarillo Warbirds and Pueblo Punishers. When the 2026 NAL schedule was released, the Bulls announced Fair Park Coliseum as their new home arena.

The Bulls were expelled from the NAL on April 28, 2026 after five games, due to alleged failure to meet financial requirements. The Bulls denied the allegations and stated they would seek another league to play in the future.

== Season-by-season results ==
League champions	Playoff berth	League leader

Season	League	Regular season			Postseason results
Season	League	Finish	Wins	Losses	Postseason results
2021	AAL	1st	11	1	Won AAL Championship (Charlotte) 60–43
2022	AFA	N/A	1	0	Only played 1 league game before league folded.
2023	Dormant year				
2024	Dormant year				
2025	Dormant year				
2026	NAL	N/A	2	3	Expelled from the league after five games.
Totals			15	4	All-time regular season record
Totals			2	0	All-time postseason record
Totals			17	3	All-time regular season and postseason record

== Head coaches ==
Name	Tenure	Regular season			Playoffs		Awards
Name	Tenure	W	L	Win%	W	L	Awards
Victor Mann	2021–2022	14	1	.813	1	0	2021 AAL National Champions

== Venue ==
In 2021 and 2022, the team's home matches were held at the Fort Worth Convention Center Arena.

== Notable members and alumni ==
Throughout its history, several distinguished players have been associated with the North Texas Bulls.

- Robert Kent: Formerly played as a quarterback for Jackson State and the Tennessee Titans.
- Jordan Lott: Former Running Back at Washington and Jefferson College as well as current front office personal
- Clinton Solomon: Had previously been a wide receiver with the University of Iowa and spent time with the St. Louis Rams.
- Meshak Williams: Recognized for being the Big 12 Defensive Player of the Year and for his association with the Baltimore Ravens.
- DeAntre Harlan: Previously affiliated with the Los Angeles Rams.
- Victor Mann: Besides his coaching duties for the Bulls, Mann had a notable career as a fullback with Kansas State.
