= Charlotte Thunder =

Indoor American football team

General information
- Founded: 2017
- Folded: 2022
- Headquartered: Bojangles' Coliseum in Charlotte, North Carolina
- Colors: Black, Panther blue, silver
- CharlotteThunder.com

Personnel
- Owners: Thomas Davis Sr. Ted Ginn Jr. Joe Maus
- Head coach: Ervin Bryson

Team history
- Carolina Energy (2018–2019); Charlotte Thunder (2020–2022)

Home fields
- Bojangles' Coliseum (2018–2022)

League / conference affiliations
- American Arena League (2018–2021); Southern Division (2019); East Division (2021); Arena Professional Football League (2022)

Championships
- Division championships: 2 AAL Southern: 2019; AAL East: 2021

Playoff appearances (3)
- AAL: 2018, 2019, 2021

The Charlotte Thunder were a professional indoor American football team based out of Charlotte, North Carolina. They played their home games at the Bojangles' Coliseum.

The team was formed prior to the 2018 season as the Carolina Energy as members of the American Arena League (AAL) and was co-owned by Daniel Rudmann and head coach Ervin Bryson. They are the fourth team to play in Charlotte behind the Charlotte Rage and Carolina Cobras, both formerly of the Arena Football League, and the Carolina Speed of the American Indoor Football Association.

In 2020, the team was sold to an ownership group led by former NFL players, Ted Ginn Jr. and Thomas Davis Sr. and rebranded as the Charlotte Thunder. The team also has several other minority owners including former players Jeff Reed and Frank Garcia. The team left the AAL following the 2021 season and founded the Arena Professional Football League, recruiting several other teams from the AAL while it was on hiatus. The Thunder scheduled games against the West Michigan Ironmen, Alabama Empire, Carolina Predators, and Maryland Warriors. On October 21, 2022, the team announced on their Facebook page that the team would not be playing in the 2023 season.

== Season-by-season results ==
| League champions | Conference champions | Division champions | Playoff berth | League leader |

| Season | League | Division | Regular season | | | | Postseason results |
| Season | League | Division | Finish | Wins | Losses | Ties | Postseason results |
|---|---|---|---|---|---|---|---|
| 2018 | AAL | | 5th (Note: Qualified for the playoffs as the fourth seed due to the Georgia Doom opting not to participate.) | 5 | 3 | 0 | Lost semifinal (Richmond) 43–57 |
| 2019 | AAL | Southern | 1st (Note: The AAL counted all games played by member teams, including games against non-league members, and forfeits in the league standings for the 2019 season.) | 6 | 0 | 0 | ~~Division final (Peach State)~~ (Note: The Energy had scheduling issues with their arena and the league awarded the Energy a bye to the next round.); Won semifinal (Carolina) 58–38; Lost AAL Championship (West Virginia) 29–55 |
| 2020 | AAL | | Season cancelled due to COVID-19 pandemic | | | | |
| 2021 | AAL | East | 1st | 10 | 0 | 0 | No official postseason held by the league; named East Division champion via regular season record Lost league championship, 43–60 vs. (North Texas) (Note: The two teams chose to play each other after the league announced there would be no league championship.) |
| Totals | | | | 21 | 3 | 0 | All-time regular season record (2018–2021) |
| Totals | | | | 1 | 3 | — | All-time postseason record (2018–2021) |
| Totals | | | | 22 | 6 | 0 | All-time regular season and postseason record (2018–2021) |
