= Classic Center =

Convention and arts center in Athens, Georgia, US

The Classic Center
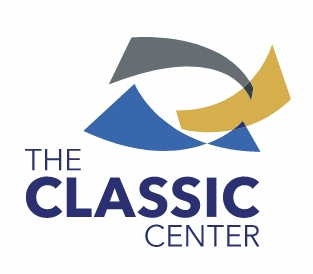

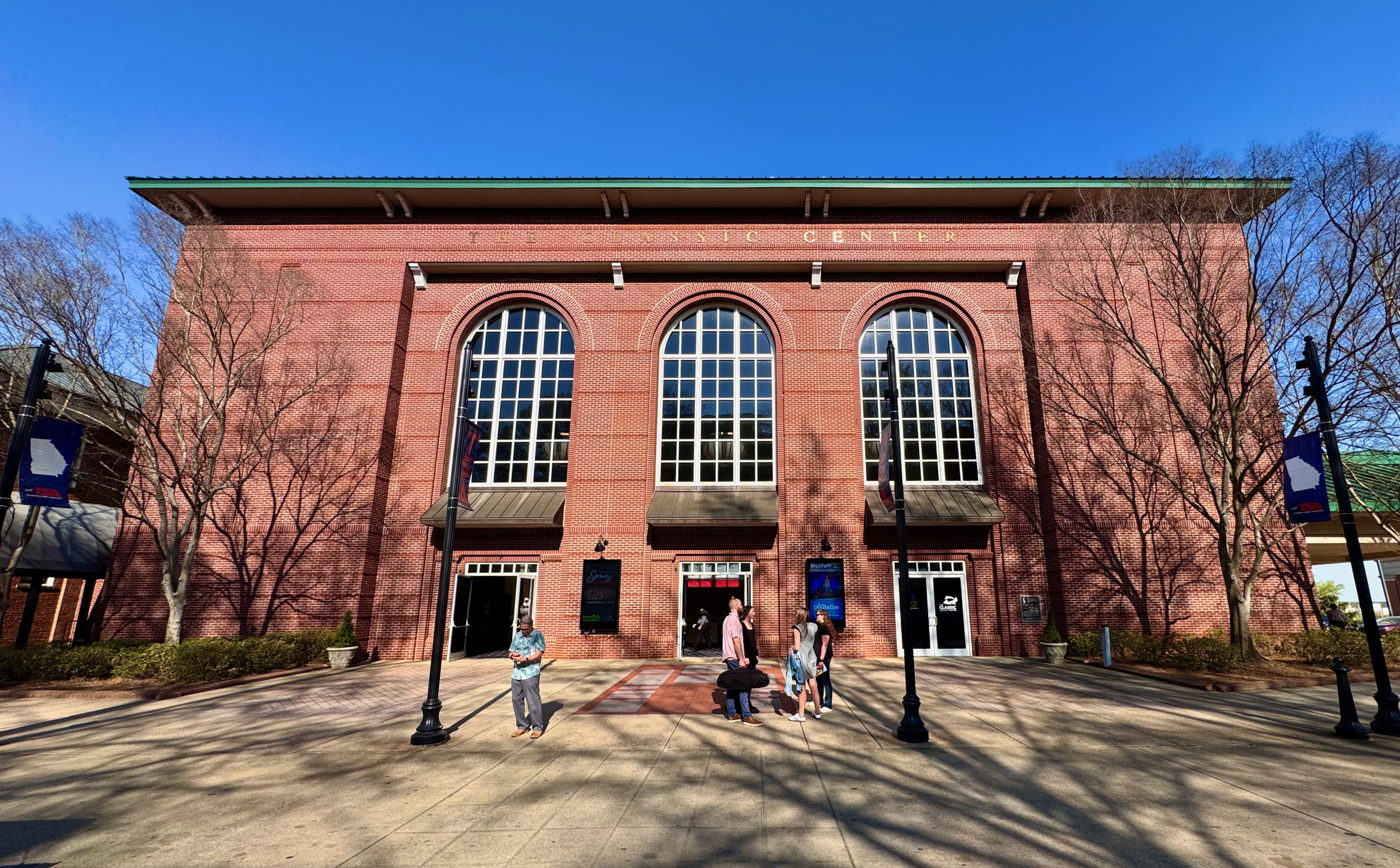

- Location within Georgia Location within the United States
- Address: 300 N Thomas Street Athens, GA 30601, United States
- Coordinates: 33.960618°N 83.372352°W
- Operator: The Classic Center Authority
- Capacity: 2,000
- Public transit: Athens Transit at Athens Multimodal Transportation Center

Construction
- Opened: 1995

Tenants
- UGA Ice Dawgs hockey (SECHC) (2014–2024); Peach State Cats (AAL) (2019)

Website
- www.ClassicCenter.com

The Classic Center is a convention center in Athens, Georgia, United States. It was opened in 1995. Located within is Akins Ford Arena at The Classic Center, a large event hall that also serves as a 2,000-seat arena. The arena is home to the UGA Ice Dawgs hockey team and formerly the Peach State Cats arena football team. The Classic Center also contains a 2,122-seat theatre.

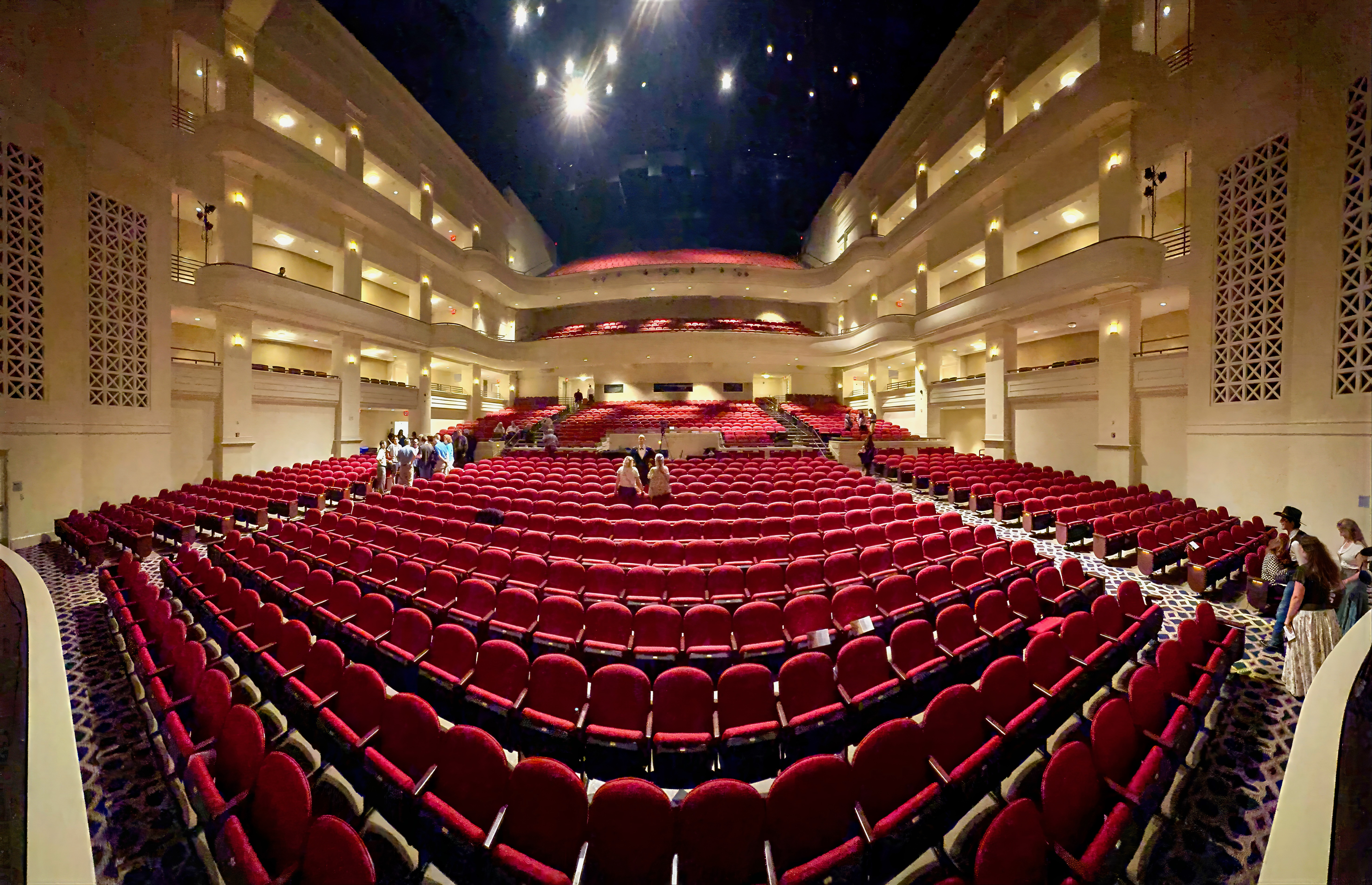
The 2,122-seat theatre auditorium at the Classic Center

== History ==
In 1987, the Civic Center Study Committee was created to determine the ideal public assembly facility for the Athens community. The committee determined that a facility with an 18,000 square-foot ballroom, 28,000 square-foot exhibit hall, and a 2,000-seat theatre was the best option. The facility was designed over the next few years, and construction began in 1994. The first phase opened in 1995, and the theatre opened the following year.

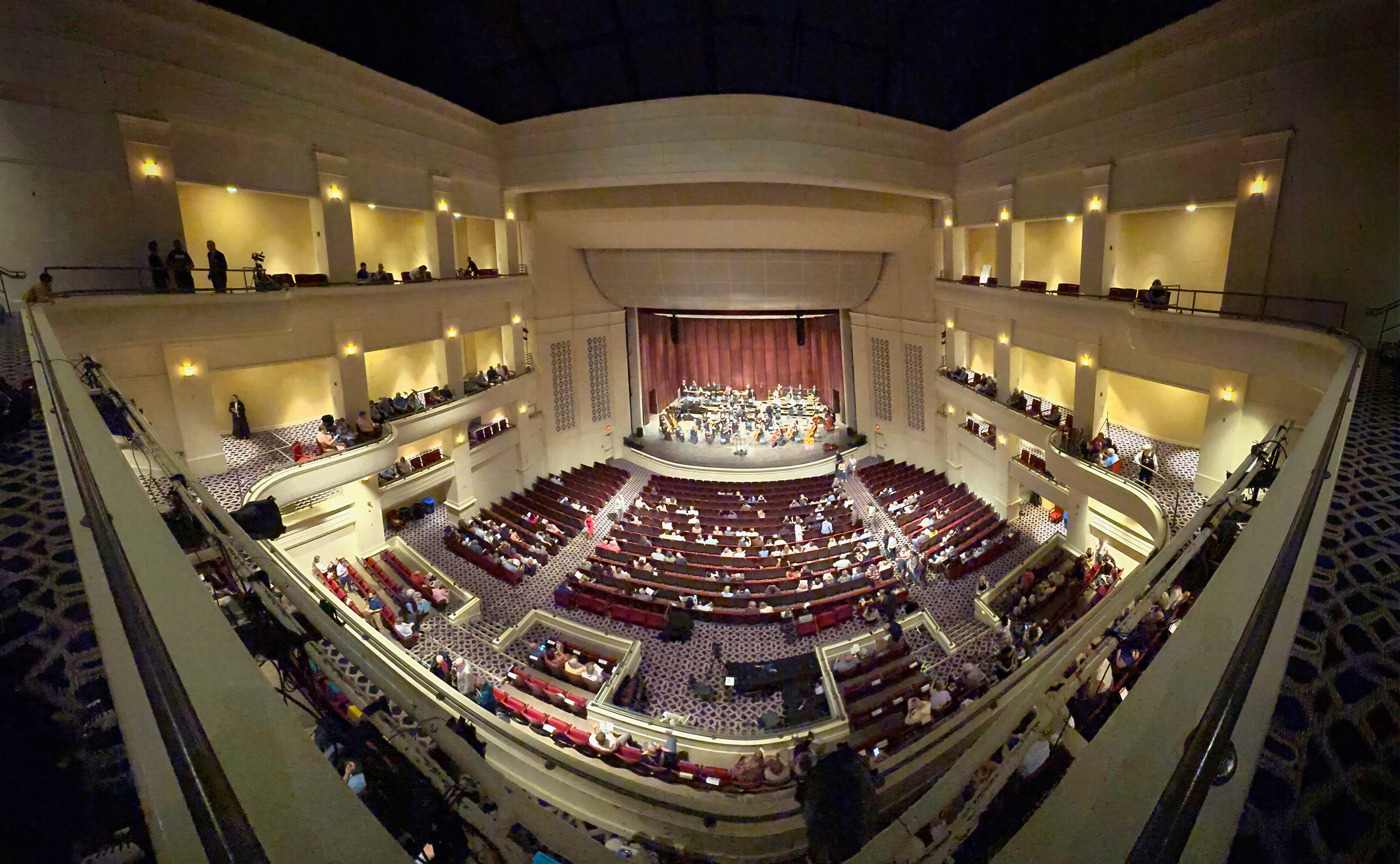
The Classic Center stage as seen from the topmost balcony

In October, 2013, upgrades were approved for the Grand Hall, adding arena-style seating and an ice rink system. The UGA Ice Dawgs hockey team began playing their home games there starting with the 2014–15 season. The Grand Hall was referred to as the Classic Center Arena, before being renamed Akins Ford Arena at The Classic Center, after the naming rights were sold to Akins Ford of Winder, Georgia in 2015.

In 2018, it was announced that the American Arena League's Peach State Cats arena football team would be moving to Akins Ford Arena at The Classic Center for the 2019 season.

== Akins Ford Arena ==
In January 2019, the Classic Center Authority announced their intent to construct the new arena adjacent to the existing site. The new proposed arena is estimated to cost $88.88 million USD (2019) of which $33 million will be funded by the approved 2020 SPLOST Budget. The arena will be connected to the existing Classic Center, the Multimodal Transportation Center and the downtown district via a new elevated walkway. The arena will have a permanent seating capacity of 5,500 and will be expandable up to 7,500 seats for concerts. Construction began on the new arena in the spring of 2022 and was completed by November 2024. The hotel that was originally planned as a part of the arena was postponed due to the COVID-19 pandemic. However, The Classic Center Authority has presented a grand vision for the redevelopment of the entire district including a hotel, retirement community, office space, a new judicial center, and a multi-level parkade.

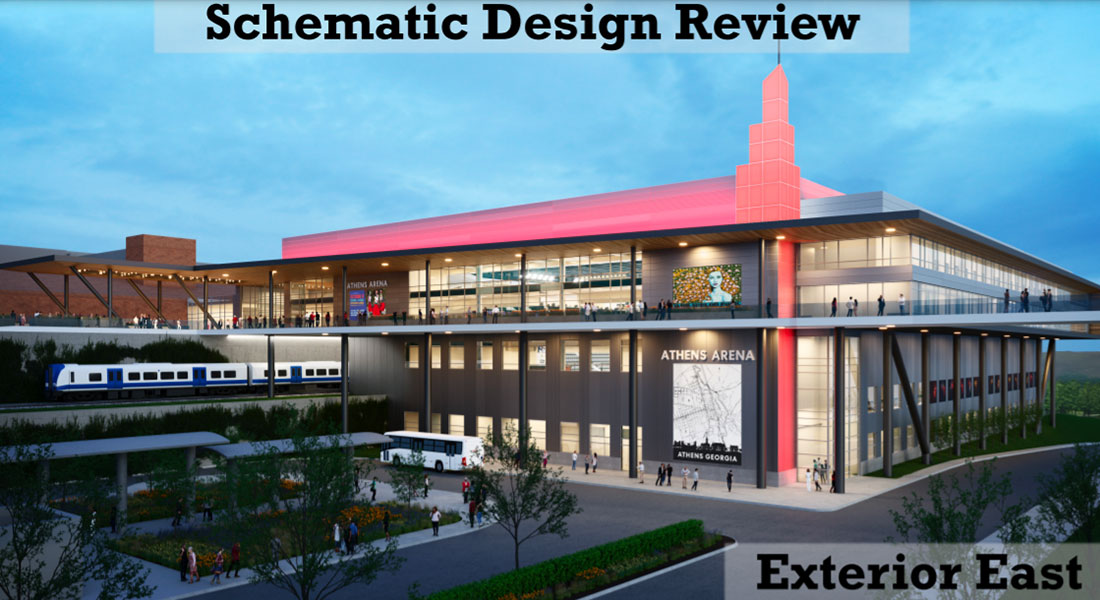
Final Presented Design of the Classic Center Arena (August 2021)
