= Mennen Arena =

Multi-purpose arena in Morris Township, New Jersey

Coordinates: 40.81545°N 74.475267°W

William G. Mennen Sports Arena
- Interactive map of William G. Mennen Sports Arena
- Location: 161 East Hanover Ave; Morristown, NJ 07960; United States
- Owner: The Morris County Park Commission
- Operator: The Morris County Park Commission
- Capacity: 2,500
- Surface: Ice
- Public transit: NJT Bus: 872

Construction
- Groundbreaking: 1973
- Opened: January 12, 1975
- Structural engineer: SunDurance Energy

Tenants
- New Jersey Revolution (CIFL/AIFA) (2008, 2010); Jersey Bearcats (AAL) (2027–)

The William G. Mennen Sports Arena, commonly referred to as Mennen Arena, is a multi-purpose arena in Morris Township, New Jersey primarily used for ice hockey and other skating activities. The building houses three regulation-sized ice rinks. The main rink has seating for 2,500 spectators.

== Usage ==
Mennen Arena is a facility of the Morris County Park Commission.

The venue is the main home ice rink for the New Jersey Colonials youth hockey program and the main training center for the Skating Club of Morris. Morris Rugby Corporation holds events at Mennen Arena. It is also the host rink for the County College of Morris hockey team as well as most of the public high school hockey teams in Morris County, New Jersey.

During the summer months the ice surface in the main rink is removed. The arena has hosted the Shrine Circus, dog shows, professional wrestling and MMA events such as Grapplers Quest and Cage Fury Fighting Championships (CFFC).

Mennen hosted one game for the New Jersey XTreme of the National Indoor Football League in 2005, and was formerly the home of the New Jersey Revolution of the American Indoor Football Association.

== History ==
The Mennen Arena was built in 1973 on land donated by the Mennen Company, now part of Colgate-Palmolive. It was opened to the public on January 12, 1975. At that time, the facility consisted of one indoor multi-purpose arena with artificial ice in place for most of the year.

A second ice surface was added in an expansion building in 1986 and a third surface added in 2002.
