= Triangle Torch =

Professional indoor football team in North Carolina

Logo

General information
- Founded: 2015
- Folded: 2018
- Headquartered: North Carolina
- Colors: Red, gold, black, white

Personnel
- Owner: Chris McKinney
- Head coach: Chris McKinney

Team history
- Triangle Torch (2016–2017); East Carolina Torch (2018)

Home fields
- Dorton Arena (2016–2017); Duplin County Events Center (2018)

League / conference affiliations
- American Indoor Football (2016); Northern Division (2016); Supreme Indoor Football (2017); American Arena League (2018)

Playoff appearances (1)
- SIF: 2017

The Triangle Torch (also known as the East Carolina Torch) was a professional indoor football team playing in North Carolina. The team first played as the Triangle Torch in Raleigh, North Carolina, and was named after the larger Research Triangle region. The Torch started in 2016 as an expansion franchise of American Indoor Football (AIF). The AIF ceased operations and the Torch joined Supreme Indoor Football for the 2017 season. For the 2018 season, the team relocated to Kenansville, North Carolina, as the East Carolina Torch, and joined the American Arena League for its inaugural season.

The Torch was the third indoor football team to play in Raleigh, after the Carolina Cobras of the Arena Football League (2000–2002) and the Raleigh Rebels of the Atlantic Indoor Football League (2005–2006).

== History ==
In August 2015, it was announced that an American Indoor Football (AIF) expansion team called the Triangle Torch would begin play in Raleigh, North Carolina, with home games to be played in Dorton Arena. The team was originally owned by George Stuphen, whose son played for the Alabama Hammers. Stuphen decided to bring a team to Raleigh due to talent in the area.

The Torch opened up their inaugural season with a 55–33 victory over the Winston Wildcats on March 20, 2016. Following the 2016 season, American Indoor Football ceased operations, and the Torch were left without a league.

In September 2016, Supreme Indoor Football (SIF) listed the Torch as a member. The Torch later confirmed they had joined the SIF on October 28. The team was sold in 2017 to David Foster, Harold Turner, and head coach Chris McKinney.

After going undefeated through the 2017 SIF season, the team lost the championship game to the Cape Fear Heroes. Not long after the game, the Torch announced they would be leaving the SIF. One month later, they were added to the newly formed American Arena League (AAL). Prior to the start of the 2018 AAL season, the Torch lost owners Harold Turner and David Foster to other business opportunities, leaving coach Chris McKinney as the sole owner from the previous season's ownership transition. In March 2018, the Torch also announced via social media they would have to play the season nearly 90 miles from Raleigh in Kenansville, North Carolina, at the Duplin County Events Center. With the new location, the team changed its name to the East Carolina Torch.

The Torch opened the 2018 season on the road with a 28–38 loss to the High Country Grizzlies before winning their first home game 51–12 over the Upstate Dragons. The team canceled and forfeited their second home game on May 5 against the Cape Fear Heroes. They won 69–6 over the AAL affiliate travel team Carolina Cowboys at home. In the following game at the Richmond Roughriders, they lost and had two players suspended for the rest of the season an illegal low block on a receiver in motion. After a 2–3 record and three home games remaining, the Torch canceled the rest of their 2018 season on May 26.

Following the 2018 season, the Torch began calling themselves the Capital City Torch but, as of August 2018, did not have a lease for an arena in the Raleigh area. On November 14, 2018, Torch owner and head coach Chris McKinney was hired by the Cape Fear Heroes as its head coach for 2019 and the Torch shut down operations.

== Statistics ==
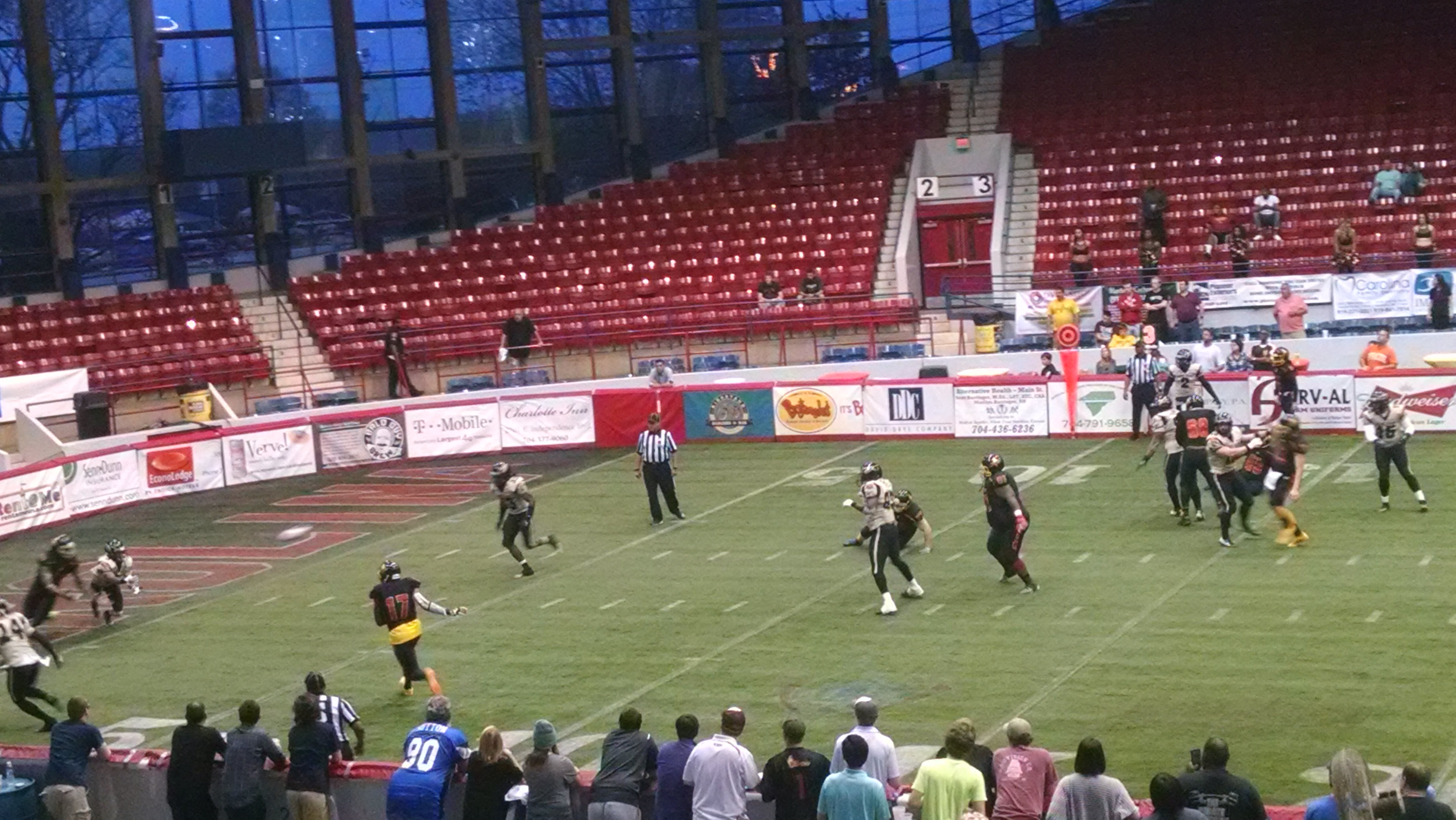
Triangle Torch (black jerseys with red and yellow accents) vs. Lehigh Valley Steelhawks (gold jerseys with black accents) during a game at Dorton Arena, March 25, 2016

=== Season-by-season results ===
League champions	Division champions	Playoff berth	League leader

Season	Team	League	Division	Regular season				Postseason results
Season	Team	League	Division	Finish	Wins	Losses	Ties	Postseason results
2016	2016	AIF	Northern	7th	3	4	0	
2017	2017	SIF		1st	6	0	0	Lost SIF Championship (Heroes) 24–30
2018	2018	AAL		DNF	2	6 (Note: Includes four forfeited home games)	0	
Totals					11	10	0	0–1 in postseason

=== Head coaches' records ===
Note: Statistics are correct through the end of the 2018 American Arena League season.

Name	Term	Regular season				Playoffs		Awards
Name	Term	W	L	T	Win%	W	L	Awards
Josh Resignalo	2016	3	4	0	.429	—	—	
Chris McKinney	2017–2018	8	6	0	.571	0	1	
