= Carolina Havoc =

American-football team

Logo

General information
- Founded: 2017
- Folded: 2019
- Headquartered: Florence, South Carolina
- CarolinaHavoc.com

Personnel
- Owners: Chris Duffy; Kelli Powers; Heath Tate
- Head coach: Anson Yarbourough

Team history
- Atlanta Havoc (2018); Carolina Havoc (2019)

Home fields
- Buford Arena (2018); Florence Center (2019)

League / conference affiliations
- American Arena League (2018–2019); Atlantic Division (2019)

Championships
- League championships: 1: AAL: 2018
- Division championships: 1: AAL Atlantic: 2019

Playoff appearances (2)
- AAL: 2018, 2019

The Carolina Havoc were a professional indoor football team based out of Florence, South Carolina, as members of the American Arena League. In the 2018 season, the team was known as the Atlanta Havoc.

== History ==
The franchise announced themselves as the Atlanta Havoc, an expansion team who were charter members of the new American Arena League (AAL) on September 10, 2017. The team was added to the AAL on September 22 where it was revealed the owner was Tim Viens, who already owned the Vermont Bucks in the AAL until he sold that team in December 2017. The team also announced that they would play their inaugural 2018 season out of the Buford Arena, a local arena used by Buford High School, in Buford, Georgia.

On April 14, 2018, founder and majority owner Tim Viens stepped away from the team. After going undefeated for the first six league games, the Havoc initially lost their first game due to a forfeit to the Cape Fear Heroes for not having their field goal posts ready for their home game on May 26. The team appealed the forfeit claiming the opponent did not wait long enough before leaving; the forfeit loss was expunged from the Havoc's record, while the walkover win was still awarded to the Heroes. The Havoc were then allowed to schedule another league game for the following week, traveled to play the Carolina Energy instead of their non-league home game against the Peach State Cats, and lost their first actual game 45–41. The Havoc also lost the following game, and last regular season, to the Georgia Doom, dropping to the second seed for the playoffs. However, the third-seeded Doom then opted out of participating in the playoffs, leading to a scheduled match-up against the Heroes at home. The league then announced that the Heroes would host the semifinal game instead despite retaining the third seed. The Havoc would win the semifinal game over the Heroes 61–54 to face the top-seeded Richmond Roughriders in the AAL championship. They defeated the Roughriders 58–50.

On July 26, 2018, general manager Josh Resignalo announced they had signed a one-year lease to play at the Florence Center in Florence, South Carolina. The team was rebranded as the Carolina Havoc. Resignalo also took over head coaching responsibilities as Boo Mitchell stayed in Georgia and was named general manager of the Peach State Cats. However, on September 29, Resignalo announced that he stepped down as head coach and general manager of the Carolina Havoc to take a new position as assistant coach of the National Arena League's defending champion Carolina Cobras. Steven Smith was then named the general manager and then former defensive lineman Anson Yarbourough was named the head coach. The team would go on to sign a number of indoor and arena football veterans which included quarterback Daryl Clark, wide receivers Thyron Lewis and Rashad Carter and defensive back Micheaux Robinson. Later on in free agency, they would set a precedent as they signed the first international player in the short history of the American Arena League in English national Cameron Craig.

The Carolina Havoc would go on to a 7–1 regular season, with their only loss coming against the Carolina Energy, including three wins over non-league members. The Havoc then won their divisional playoff game over the Cape Fear Heroes before losing again to the Energy in the league semifinal game.

After the season ended, the Florence Center unanimously voted to not renew the Havoc's lease for 2020 citing very low attendance. General manager Steven Smith then resigned in October 2019 and sued the team over unpaid salary adding up to more than $32,000. Head coach Anson Yarbourough then joined former general manager Josh Resignalo with the Carolina Cobras as a defensive coordinator.
