= West Virginia Roughriders =

Professional indoor football team in Wheeling, West Virginia

Logo

General information
- Founded: 2016
- Folded: 2022
- Headquartered: Wheeling, West Virginia at the WesBanco Arena
- Colors: Black, lime green, silver, white
- WestVirginiaRoughriders.com

Personnel
- Owners: Gregg Fornario; Mike Kacor; Jim Jones
- General manager: Marty Medovic
- Head coach: Mook Zimmerman

Team history
- Richmond Roughriders (2017–2018); West Virginia Roughriders (2019–2022)

Home fields
- Richmond Coliseum (2017–2018); WesBanco Arena (2019)

League / conference affiliations
- Arena Pro Football (2017); American Arena League (2018–2019); Northern Division (2019); National Arena League (2020–2021)

Championships
- League championships: 2: APF: 2017; AAL: 2019
- Division championships: 1: AAL Northern: 2019

Playoff appearances (3)
- APF: 2017; AAL: 2018, 2019

The West Virginia Roughriders were a professional indoor football team based in Wheeling, West Virginia. They were founded in 2016 as the Richmond Roughriders and played at the Richmond Coliseum in 2017 and 2018.

They were members the Arena Pro Football (APF) league in 2017. The Roughriders initially announced they were joining the National Arena League (NAL) for the 2018 season but then later joined the American Arena League (AAL). After the one season in the AAL, the owner announced he was creating his own league, Professional Arena Football, and left the AAL but the new league never gained traction and the team returned to the AAL. Concurrently, the Roughriders also moved to Wheeling due to arena issues in Richmond. They again announced they were not returning to the AAL for the 2020 season and joined the NAL two years after initially backing out. However, the 2020 season was cancelled due to the effects of the COVID-19 pandemic, the team opted to go dormant for the 2021 season, and then left the NAL prior to the 2022 season.

== History ==
=== Richmond Roughriders (2017–2018) ===
The Roughriders were first formed in October 2016 as members of Arena Pro Football's inaugural season. The team would go undefeated in the 2017 season in the unstable APF. The Roughriders defeated the Florida Tarpons 71–61 to capture the APF's only championship.

At the end of the first season, the APF was announced to have merged with the Can-Am Indoor Football League for the 2018 season to create the American Arena League (AAL). The new league initially announced the Roughriders as members in the league, but ownership claimed they were still exploring their options and never committed to the AAL. On July 20, 2017, the National Arena League announced it had conditionally approved a team from Richmond as members for the 2018 season with the Roughriders confirming that they were finalizing their NAL expansion requirements. However, on September 13, 2017, the team announced that they were instead joining the American Arena League citing that the AAL would be a better fit for them.

In December 2017, rapper Jim Jones became part owner of the team along with the original owners Gregg Fornario and Mike Kacor. Jones immediately made the news by publicly offering the then-currently unemployed and controversial former NFL quarterbacks Colin Kaepernick and Johnny Manziel a position on the team. On January 26, 2018, the team announced the signing of controversial former NFL defensive lineman Greg Hardy. The signing gained significant media attention, mostly criticizing the move in response the on-going Me Too movement, heightened attention to the treatment of women, and Hardy's 2014 domestic violence charge.

In the 2018 season, the Roughriders continued to have success and went 7–1 for the season and first-place finish, only losing to the Georgia Doom. After the Atlanta Havoc lost their final game of the season, also to the Doom, the Roughriders earned home field advantage for the playoffs. They defeated the Carolina Energy 57–43 in a semifinal game before facing the Havoc. The Roughriders led the game through the first half, but the Havoc came back to win the inaugural AAL championship game 58–50. After the end of the season, the Roughriders home, the Richmond Coliseum, was scheduled for demolition and to be replaced by a new venue. The team claimed any new arena would be priced out of their affordability and the Roughriders could not return to Richmond for a 2019 season. Majority owner and general manager Gregg Fornario stated they were looking into venues in Hershey, Reading, and Wilkes-Barre in Pennsylvania, Norfolk in Virginia, and Atlantic City in New Jersey.

=== West Virginia Roughriders (2019–2021) ===
On August 15, 2018, Roughriders' owner Gregg Fornario announced his intentions of creating a new league called Northern Arena Football (NAF). His Roughriders team was not initially planning on leaving the AAL with the NAF only having teams north of the Maryland-Pennsylvania border. However, by August 28, Fornario had rebranded the new league as Professional Arena Football (PAF) with multiple divisions, Northern Arena Football and Southern Arena Football, and the Roughriders were announced as part of Professional Arena Football on August 30, leaving the AAL. The league was also announced to have the New England Cavalry and Marion Mambas as members. By November 2018, no new teams had been accepted by the PAF and Fornario decided to not launch the league in 2019.

After the loss of the Richmond Coliseum, the Roughriders also settled on a lease to use WesBanco Arena in Wheeling, West Virginia, becoming the West Virginia Roughriders. However, Fornario's plans to launch the new league fell through and the team rejoined the AAL for the 2019 season as part of a new Northern Division. The Northern Division consisted of the Burgh Defenders, Jersey Flight, and New England Bobcats. The Flight nearly folded at the start of the season and delayed their season starting date, the Bobcats folded midseason, and the Defenders lost their arena, leading to the Roughriders playing eight of their ten games at home. The team then went undefeated for a 10–0 record and eight wins against AAL opponents. They defeated the Flight in the divisional playoff championship before facing the West Michigan Ironmen, the Midwest Division champion. The Roughriders then advanced to their third straight league championship game, again at home, and beat the Carolina Energy 55–29 to win their first AAL championship.

Following the season, Fornario again announced he was removing the Roughriders from the AAL due to differences with league operations. On October 24, 2019, the Roughriders were official added to the National Arena League (NAL), two years after Fornario had decided to join the AAL instead of the NAL. The 2020 NAL was then cancelled due to the COVID-19 pandemic and head coach Mook Zimmerman decided to retire in August 2020. At the end of the month, team owner Fornario announced the team was for sale. On October 30, 2020, the NAL announced the Roughriders would be dormant for at least the 2021 season. By December 2020, Fornario signed an agreement to sell the franchise to HMG Sports, the group that attempted to launch the Baltimore Lightning in the NAL for the 2021 season before having their membership terminated three weeks later for not providing a letter of credit and an arena lease. The sale apparently never completed.

In October 2021, Fornario stated that he was disputing terms of the team's membership contract with the NAL. The Roughriders then stated they would not return to the NAL and were looking into other options. Fornario tweeted that he was in discussions with selling the team to the ownership group that operated the NAL's Albany Empire led by Ron Trideco to keep the team in the NAL, but were eventually removed from the list of 2022 NAL teams and were not included in the schedule. On January 12, 2022, The team announced on their Facebook page that, due to renovations to WesBanco Arena that would force the closure of the venue from June 1 to September 1, the Roughriders would not be playing the 2022 season and options to buy the team were put on hold. On October 24, 2022, head coach Mook Zimmerman signed with the IFL's Massachusetts Pirates as a linebackers and defensive lineman coach.

== Statistics ==
=== Season-by-season results ===
As of the 2019 season:

League champions	Division champions	Playoff berth	League leader

Season	League	Division	Regular season				Postseason results
Season	League	Division	Finish	Wins	Losses	Ties	Postseason results
2017	APF	N/A	1st	4	0	0	Won APF Championship (Tarpons) 74–61
2018	AAL	N/A	1st	7	1	0	Won Semifinal (Carolina) 57–43; Lost AAL Championship (Atlanta) 50–58
2019	AAL	Northern	1st (Note: The AAL counted all games played by member teams, including games against non-league members, and forfeits in the league standings for the 2019 season.)	10	0	0	Won Division final (Jersey) 57–13; Won Semifinal (West Michigan) 45–6; Won AAL Championship (Carolina) 55–29
2020	NAL		Season cancelled due to COVID-19 pandemic				
Totals				21	1	0	All-time regular season record (2017–2019)
Totals				5	1	—	All-time postseason record (2017–2019)
Totals				26	2	0	All-time regular season and postseason record (2017–2019)

=== 2017 APF season ===
Week	Date	Opponent	Result	Record	Game site	Notes
1	April 8	Alabama Outlawz	W 84–4	1–0	Richmond Coliseum	
2	April 15	at River City Raiders	W 54–39	2–0	Family Arena	
3	April 22	Savannah Coastal Outlaws	W 94–14	3–0	Richmond Coliseum	
4	April 29	Carolina Cowboys (EIF)	W 92–0		Richmond Coliseum	Non-league game
5	May 6	Florida Tarpons	W 55–34	4–0	Richmond Coliseum	
6	Bye					
7	May 20	Atlanta Furious (EIF)	W 82–14		Richmond Coliseum	Non-league game
8	May 27	Triangle Torch (SIF)	W 69–40		Richmond Coliseum	Non-league game
9	June 10	Florida Tarpons	W 74–61		Richmond Coliseum	Championship game

=== 2018 AAL season ===
Week	Date	Opponent	Result	Record	Game site	Notes
1	March 17	at High Country Grizzlies	W 34–19	1–0	George M. Holmes Convocation Center	
2	Bye					
3	March 31	Carolina Energy	W 52–38	2–0	Richmond Coliseum	
4	April 7	Cape Fear Heroes	W 76–32	3–0	Richmond Coliseum	
5	April 14	at Florida Tarpons	W 58–20	4–0	RP Funding Center	
6	April 20	at Jersey Flight	W 56–50	5–0	CURE Insurance Arena	
7	April 28	New England Cavalry	W 61–14	(Note: As only eight league games can count for league standings, at the beginning of the season, AAL team owners chose which games they play against in-league opponents in excess of the eight games that do not count towards their overall league record.)	Richmond Coliseum	Non-league game
8	May 5	Peach State Cats	W 82–22		Richmond Coliseum	Non-league game
9	May 12	at Georgia Doom	L 44–56	5–1	Macon Coliseum	
10	May 19	East Carolina Torch	W 68–33	6–1	Richmond Coliseum	
11	May 26	Jersey Flight	W 74–65		Richmond Coliseum	Non-league game
12	June 2	High Country Grizzlies	W 70–62	7–1	Richmond Coliseum	
13	Bye					
	June 16	Carolina Energy	W 57–43		Richmond Coliseum	Semifinal
	June 30	Atlanta Havoc	L 50–58		Richmond Coliseum	Championship game

=== 2019 AAL season ===
Week	Date	Opponent	Result	Record (Note: The AAL counted all games played by member teams, including games against non-league members, in the league standings for the 2019 season.)	Game site	Notes
1	March 23	Burgh Defenders	W 95–18	1–0	WesBanco Arena	
2	Bye					
3	April 6	at Cape Fear Heroes	W 54–15	2–0	Crown Coliseum	
4	April 15	High Point Wildcats (EIF)	W 51–30	3–0	WesBanco Arena	Non-league game
5	April 19	at West Michigan Ironmen	W 33–28	4–0	L.C. Walker Arena	
6	April 26	New England Bobcats	W 41–22	5–0	WesBanco Arena	
7	May 4	Burgh Defenders	W 74–0	6–0	WesBanco Arena (Note: Originally scheduled as a Defenders home game.)	
8	~~May 11~~	~~at New England Bobcats~~	Forfeit win	7–0	~~Driscoll Arena~~	(Note: Bobcats folded May 7.)
9	May 18	Jersey Flight	W 53–16	8–0	WesBanco Arena	
~~10~~	~~May 27~~	~~Capital City Reapers (MAIFL)~~	—		~~WesBanco Arena~~	~~Non-league game~~ (Note: Reapers folded.)
10	May 27	New England Cavalry (NEAL)	W 28–24	9–0	WesBanco Arena	Non-league game
11	May 31	Carolina Cowboyz	W 54–0	10–0	WesBanco Arena	
	June 8	Jersey Flight	W 57–13		WesBanco Arena	Division playoff game
	June 15	West Michigan Ironmen	W 45–6		WesBanco Arena	Semifinal playoff game
	June 29	Carolina Energy	W 55–29		WesBanco Arena	Championship game
