= Jersey Bearcats =

American arena football team

Logo

General information
- Founded: 2018
- Headquartered: Warinanco Sports Center in Roselle, New Jersey
- Colors: Black, red, white
- JerseyBearcatsFootball.com

Personnel
- Owner: AJ Roque
- General manager: AJ Roque
- Head coach: AJ Roque

Team history
- Jersey Bearcats (2019–present)

Home fields
- Trophy Park (Jackson) (2021–2022); Warinanco Sports Center (2023–present)

League / conference affiliations
- Mid-Atlantic Indoor Football League (2019); American Arena League/American Arena League 2 (2021-present)

Championships
- League championships: 1: AAL2: 2023
- Conference championships: 0; 0
- Division championships: 0; 0

Playoff appearances (2)
- 2023, 2024

The Jersey Bearcats are a professional indoor football team based in Roselle, New Jersey. They are currently members of American Arena League and have played their home games at the Warinanco Sports Center over the last 3 seasons, if not longer. They are owned by AJ Roque, with Roque also serving as general manager and head coach. They were AAL2 champions in 2023.

== History ==
The Bearcats were founded in 2018 by former player AJ Roque as a way to bring the indoor sports to smaller communities. Debuting as a charter member of the American Arena League in 2021 after joining the league the year prior.

=== 2023 ===
On July 8, 2023, the Bearcats defeated the Steel City Stampede 39-18 to win the Championship Bowl I title game.

=== 2024 ===
On April 15, the Bearcats began their 2024 campaign as defending AAL2 Champions facing the team they defeated in the 2023 finals, the Steel City Stampede. They would later slaughter the Stampede on June 15 in round one of the 2024 AAL2 Playoffs 40-0 to advance to the semi-finals against the Wheeling Miners. They would lose to the Miners 27-18 ending their season.

=== 2025 ===
The Bearcats returned for another season and also returned to the AAL2 Championship Game at home against the Mississippi Wolfpack, who upset the Bearcats on the last play of the game by a final of 32-29. The Bearcats would jump back up to the American Arena League months later in October 2025 and will begin play in 2026.

== Media ==
The Bearcats are streamed live on the PDF Sports Network on YouTube. The games were previously and are expected to again be simulcast on NY 48 WWON-TV (internet television) Brooklyn, New York, online and on Roku.
