= Upstate Dragons =

Logo

General information
- Founded: 2017
- Folded: 2018
- Headquartered: Anderson Sports and Entertainment Center in Anderson, South Carolina
- dragonsfootball17.com

Personnel
- Head coach: Kent Merideth

Team history
- Upstate Dragons (2017–2018)

Home fields
- Anderson Sports and Entertainment Center (2018)

League / conference affiliations
- Supreme Indoor Football (2017); American Arena League (2018)

The Upstate Dragons were a professional indoor football team based out of Anderson, South Carolina, and played their home games at Anderson Sports and Entertainment Center in the 2018 season. They were members of Supreme Indoor Football as a travel team in 2017 and the American Arena League in 2018.

== History ==
The team was first announced to be based out of Greenville, South Carolina, and called the Greenville Dragons. The team started using "Upstate" when they instead became a traveling team as a member of Supreme Indoor Football (SIF) for the 2017 season. The SIF recorded the Dragons had played six games, all losses, and finished last in the four-team league.

After their first traveling season, the Dragons moved to Anderson when they got an arena lease for the 2018 season. At that time, the Dragons left the SIF and joined the new American Arena League (AAL) for its inaugural season. The team had their first home game on March 31, 2018, against the Austin Wild, and AAL affiliated traveling team that had also come from the SIF where it had been known as the Cap City Bulls. The Dragons lost 51–50. The Dragons got their first win against another AAL traveling team, the Peach State Cats, on April 7. The AAL had many canceled games during the season, leading to several reschedules, but when the Florida Tarpons decided to end their season early by not traveling for any more away games, the Dragons also backed out of playing in the Tarpons' last home game for May 26. The following week, the Dragons canceled their own home game, again against the Wild, citing injuries to its roster. By June 2, the organization announced they would also cancel their final game of the season.

The team was removed from the AAL following the 2018 season.

== Season-by-season results ==
| League champions | Playoff berth | League leader |

| Season | League | Regular season | | | | Postseason results |
| Season | League | Finish | Wins | Losses | Ties | Postseason results |
|---|---|---|---|---|---|---|
| 2017 | SIF | 4th | 0 | 6 | — | |
| 2018 | AAL | DNF | 1 | 5 (Note: 7 losses including their two final forfeits) | — | |
| Totals | | | 1 | 11 | 0 | No playoff appearances |
