= Wheeling Miners =

Indoor football team in Wheeling, WV, US

Logo

General information
- Founded: 2023
- Headquartered: Wheeling, West Virginia
- Colors: Navy blue, gold, white
- GoWVMiners.com

Personnel
- Owners: Chris Duffy Craig McIntyre; Jennifer McIntyre
- General manager: TBA
- Head coach: Chris McKinney

Team history
- West Virginia Miners (2023); Wheeling Miners (2024–current)

Home fields
- WesBanco Arena (2024–future)

League / conference affiliations
- American Arena League 2 (2024); National Arena League (2025); American Arena League (2026–current)

Championships
- League championships: 1: 2024
- Division championships: 1: 2024

Playoff appearances (1)
- 2024

The Wheeling Miners are an indoor football team based in Wheeling, West Virginia. They are former members of the American Arena League 2 and have played their home games at the WesBanco Arena since 2024. They replaced the now-defunct West Virginia Roughriders. On June 21, 2024, they joined the National Arena League for the 2025 season. On September 12, 2025, they joined the relaunched American Arena League for 2026 along with their rivals the Columbus Lions.

== History ==
Original logo (2023)

The team were originally to have been known as the West Virginia Miners and were to have played in the American Indoor Football league. On July 14, 2023, the AIF announced that Wheeling, West Virginia, would become the fourth city in the newly-revived league to host a new expansion franchise owned by Chris Duffy. Head coach and general manager is Joshua Resignalo. Just three days later, the name, logos and colors were unveiled as those of the West Virginia Miners, sharing its name with the defunct Prospect League summer collegiate baseball franchise. They are the latest team be set to play at the WesBanco Arena. Past teams include the Ohio Valley Greyhounds and West Virginia Roughriders.

Just a couple of months later, the AIF dropped the Miners from their website and the team began looking for a new league. On November 1, 2023, the announced their intention to play in the American Arena League's AAL2 and were renamed the Wheeling Miners.

On June 21, 2024, the Miners announced that they have become new members of the National Arena League. Mere weeks later, on July 6, 2024, the Miners dismantled the Peach State Cats 61–14 to win the AAL2 Championship before leaving for the NAL.

On September 12, 2025, the Miners announced on social media their entrance into the revived American Arena League and with their rivals the Columbus Lions.

On April 26, 2026, Chris Cipriani was named the new General Manager.
