= San Antonio Rose Palace =

Multi-purpose arena in San Antonio, Texas

- Interactive map of San Antonio Rose Palace
- Former names: Silver Rose Garden, Twin Oaks Exposition Center
- Location: 25665 Boerne Stage Road; San Antonio, Texas 78255
- Coordinates: 29°40′55.17″N 98°40′29.51″W
- Owner: George Strait
- Operator: RP3 Management
- Capacity: 4,500
- Acreage: 72

Construction
- Opened: 1982
- Renovated: 1992

Tenants
- San Antonio Steers (NIFL) (2007); San Antonio Gunslingers (AAL) (2021); Texas Wild Hogs (AAL) (2027–present)

Website
- www.sarosepalace.com

The San Antonio Rose Palace is a 4,500-seat multi-purpose arena in the Leon Springs area of San Antonio, Texas. It hosts local sporting events, rodeos, and concerts.

== History ==
San Antonio lawyer Wayne Crocker originally constructed the complex in 1982 as the Silver Rose Garden. In 1984, it was renamed by a new owner to The San Antonio Rose Palace and later to the Twin Oaks Exposition Center.

Investor Michael Hopkins purchased the equestrian center from the Resolution Trust Corporation in 1992, which was liquidating assets of First State Savings, an insolvent San Antonio savings and loan association. He began renovations on the facility and restored the previous San Antonio Rose Palace name.

In 1998, a group of investors led by country singer George Strait purchased the facility. The Rose Palace was put up for sale in 2018 and temporarily closed. In March 2019, the arena announced plans to re-open under new management, but still owned by Strait.

== Events ==
The Rose Palace hosted the San Antonio Steers of the National Indoor Football League.
