= Vermont Bucks =

Vermont based football team

Logo

General information
- Founded: 2016
- Folded: 2021
- Headquartered: Burlington, Vermont
- vermontbucksfootball.com

Personnel
- Owner: Joanna Morse
- Head coach: Jeff Porter

Team history
- Vermont Bucks (2017, 2019–2020)

Home fields
- Gutterson Fieldhouse (2017); Collins-Perley Sports Complex (2020)

League / conference affiliations
- Can-Am Indoor Football League (2017); Eastern Division (2017); New England Arena League (2019); Elite Indoor Football (2020)

Championships
- League championships: 1: Can-Am: 2017
- Division championships: 1: Can-Am: 2017

Playoff appearances (1)
- Can-Am: 2017

The Vermont Bucks were an indoor football team based in Vermont. They started as a charter member of the professional Can-Am Indoor Football League (Can-Am), playing home games at Gutterson Fieldhouse in Burlington in the 2017 season. The Can-Am then announced it was merging into the American Arena League with the Bucks one of the inaugural members for the 2018 season. By January 31, 2018, the original Vermont Bucks folded after an ownership change. Another ownership group then acquired the brand and launched a semi-professional team in 2019, but did not have a home arena. They joined the Southern Steam's Elite Indoor Football for the 2020 season with home games at Collins-Perley Sports Complex in St. Albans, Vermont, but did not play due to the COVID-19 pandemic.

== History ==
The Bucks were announced as an expansion team on July 8, 2016, as part of the 2017 season in American Indoor Football (AIF). However, the league then folded on July 18, 2016. Bucks owner Tim Viens, a businessman, former Camping World Truck Series auto racer and placekicker at Glenville State College, began negotiations with the Arena Developmental League and the proposed Supreme Indoor Football (both of which are based in the southeastern United States) about joining for the 2017 season. In August 2016, the Can-Am Indoor Football League was created and listed the Bucks as one of its inaugural teams; the CAN-AM League features teams centered mostly in the northeastern U.S. The Bucks won all but one game in the Can-Am league, their lone loss coming to the Boston Blaze, a traveling team that Tim Viens also owned. Both the Bucks and the Blaze then were scheduled to meet in the Eastern Division championship, however, Viens then announced the Bucks would play the non-league semi-professional Central Penn Chargers for the division title. The Bucks would defeat the Chargers 46–6 to meet the undefeated Rochester Kings in the Can-Am championship. The Bucks then beat the undefeated Kings in Rochester by a score of 61–41.

Viens announced via Facebook in April 2017 that the team was in negotiations with another league for the 2018 season; he announced that Arena Pro Football and the Can-Am would merge for 2018 to create the American Arena League (AAL).

After the 2017 season, Viens launched another team in the AAL called the Atlanta Havoc. He then sold the Bucks to an ownership group composed of Thomas Sturgis and Kyle Jennings of Exeter, New Hampshire, and Ron Lotti of Boston. However, in January 2018, the new ownership notified the AAL they would not participate in the 2018 season.

In June 2018, an organization called Vermont Bucks Professional Arena Football, LLC began attempts at fundraising and a return for a semi-professional team in 2019. They were announced as team in the developmental New England Arena League (NEAL), a league that plays all its games in one location near Boston, for the 2019 season. After one season, the Bucks announced they were joining Elite Indoor Football (EIF), another semi-professional league, for 2020 with three or four homes games at Collins-Perley Sports Complex in St. Albans, Vermont. The Bucks did not play any EIF games during the COVID-19 pandemic in 2020 and the Bucks continued to be listed as EIF members on the league website as of July 15, 2021, but the team appears to be inactive and has since been removed from the league site.
