= WesBanco Arena =

Multi-purpose arena in Wheeling, West Virginia

Coordinates: 40°3′53″N 80°43′29″W

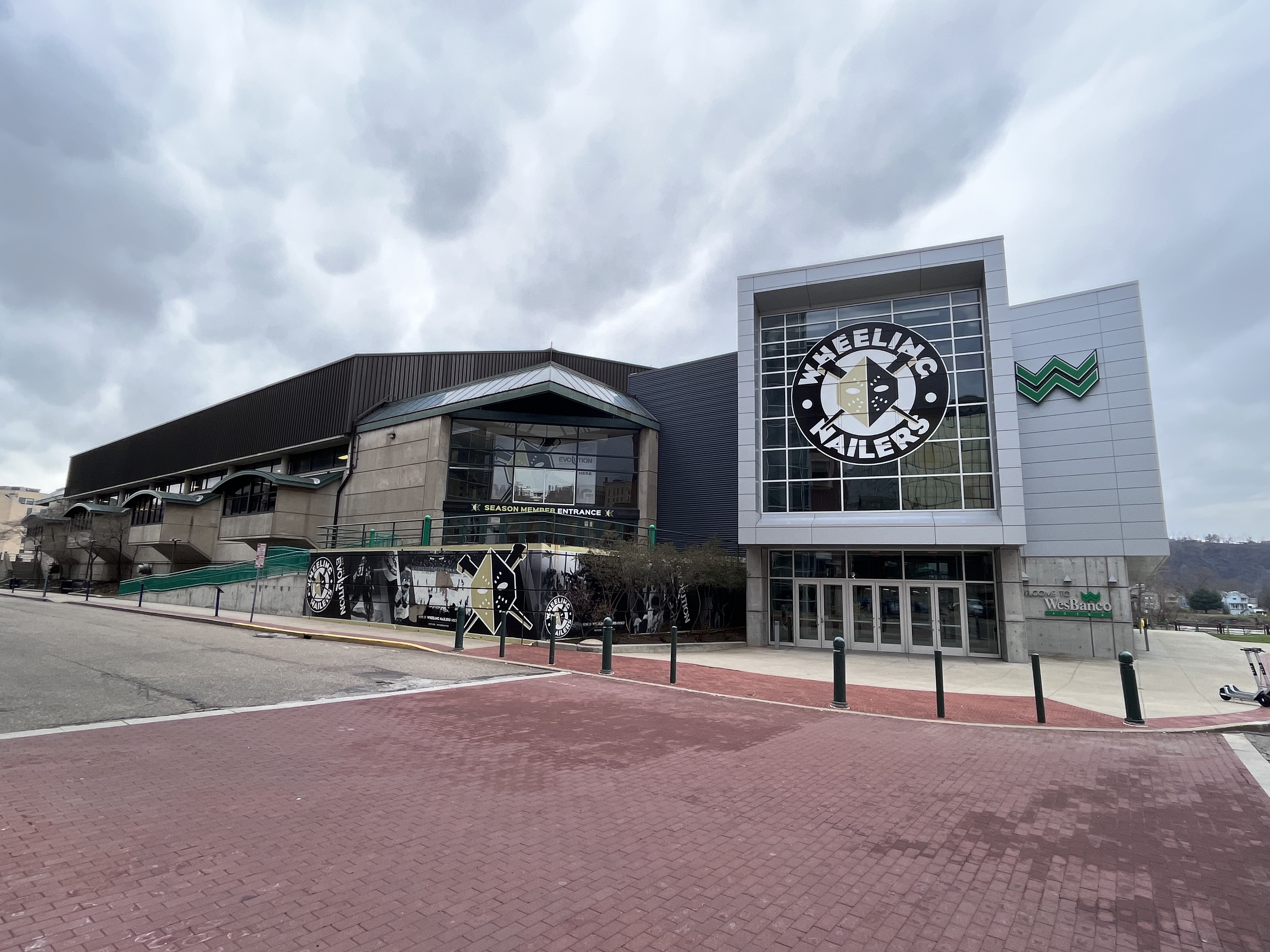

- Location within West Virginia Location within the United States
- Former names: Wheeling Civic Center (1977–2003)
- Address: 2 14th Street
- Location: Wheeling, West Virginia
- Owner: Wheeling Municipal Auditorium Board
- Operator: Wheeling Municipal Auditorium Board
- Capacity: 5,600 (concerts); 4,700 (Ice hockey)
- Surface: Multi-surface

Construction
- Groundbreaking: August 31, 1975
- Opened: April 19, 1977
- Cost: $9 million ($37.72 million in 2025 dollars)
- Architects: Dalton-Dalton Little & Newport

Tenants
- Wheeling Thunderbirds/Nailers (ECHL) (1992–present); Ohio Valley Greyhounds (NIFL/UIF) (2001–2007); Wheeling Wildcats (CIFL) (2009); West Virginia Roughriders (AAL) (2019); Wheeling Miners (AAL/NAL) (2024–present)

WesBanco Arena (originally Wheeling Civic Center) is a multi-purpose arena located in Wheeling, West Virginia. It was built in 1977 at a cost of $7 million. It is home to the Wheeling Nailers ice hockey team, the Wheeling Miners indoor football team, the Mountain East Conference basketball tournament and the Ohio Valley Athletic Conference wrestling tournament.

== Background and history ==
In February 1973, a civic center in Wheeling was proposed, and in May 1973, Mosser Construction Inc. was announced to be the architectural firm for the arena. Plans for construction of the venue, along with plans for a nearby parking garage, were approved by Wheeling City Council on April 16, 1974. The combined cost of both properties was estimated to be $9.6 million. On September 16, 1974, a petition by Wheeling residents James R. Kucera and Robert J. Haberfield, who opposed the construction of the civic center, was turned down by the Supreme Court of Appeals of West Virginia. The action paved the way for the City Council to sell bonds for the project.

The arena's original construction date, April 1, 1975, was announced in February 1975, but by September 6, 1975, construction had begun on the civic center. Around this time, the architectural firm Dalton, Dalton, Little & Newport replaced Mosser Construction Inc. as the architects. The center's opening date was announced as April 19, 1977, and on that day, the arena opened to the public with a Doobie Brothers concert, which was attended by 6,922.

On October 18, 2003, Wheeling-based bank holding company WesBanco signed a 10-year naming rights deal for $2.3 million. The company renewed the deal for 10 more years for $2.5 million on August 23, 2013.

== Amenities ==
It can also be used for conventions, trade shows, concerts, banquets and other events. It features 23,684 square feet (2,200 m^{2}) of space plus 7,500 square feet (700 m^{2}) of meeting room space. These meeting rooms can accommodate parties from ten to several hundred people. The largest meeting room is named "Health Plan Pavilion." The in-house catering department is capable of catering any size event for any needs. The meeting rooms host area Civitan, Kiwanis, Lions, Rotary and Serra's clubs lunches and meetings weekly. During Nailers hockey games and some other events the "Health Plan Pavilion" is open to all ticketed patrons featuring a full-service restaurant and bar.

It features a 46-foot (14 m)-high ceiling. The Robert C. Byrd Intermodal Transportation Center can accommodate cars for the arena's maximum capacity. The back parking lot offers parking to guests at some events and parking for trucks, trailers and buses of acts and offers direct stage access load-in through the large elephant door.

It offers access for handicap patrons, including direct access from handicap parking, an elevator, direct access to multiple concessions and restroom areas and handicap seating available from different spots throughout the arena.

== Events ==
=== Hockey ===
The Wheeling Nailers of the ECHL have played home games at the arena since 1993. The arena hosted games three, four and five of the 2016 Kelly Cup Finals, featuring the hometown Nailers taking on the visiting Allen Americans. Wheeling won game three after splitting with Allen in games one and two. The Nailers lost games four and five, giving Allen a 3–2 series lead going back to Allen. Allen went on to win the series 4–2. The 1993 ECHL All Star Classic was also held at the arena.

=== Local sports ===
The outer hallways are lined with display cases as the Ohio Valley Athletic Conference Hall of Fame. These cases display memorabilia from all schools past and present in the Ohio Valley Athletic Conference, as well as memorabilia from Ohio Valley natives, who have gone on to professional sports careers, including Bill Mazeroski, Bobby Douglas, Chuck Howley, Phil Niekro and Joe Niekro, among others. The arena also hosts the conference's annual Banquet of Champions, the largest high school athletic banquet in the United States.

It also played host to the West Virginia Mountaineers basketball team for one season in the 1999–2000 season due to construction at the team's normal venue. Other sporting events such as high school basketball, College basketball, college hockey, indoor football and others have hosted games at the arena on a regular basis. The Harlem Globetrotters have become a favorite of residents making yearly appearances at the arena.

=== Other events ===
Comedians such as Larry the Cable Guy and Jeff Dunham have appeared at the arena. Stage shows such as Cats, Chicago, Lord of the Dance and Blue Man Group, have also packed the arena. This arena has also played host to high action entertainment events such as Monster Jam, WWE, Thunder Nationals, Freestyle Motocross, PBR and others every year. On November 12, 1977, a concert by Emerson, Lake & Palmer was recorded for a future broadcast by the King Biscuit Flower Hour. Elton John also performed a concert there in 2012.
