= Cape Fear Heroes =

US professional indoor football team from North Carolina

Logo

General information
- Founded: 2011
- Headquartered: Crown Coliseum in Fayetteville, North Carolina
- Colors: Red, white, silver, & blue
- CapeFearHeroes.com

Personnel
- Owners: Barbara Spigner; Crystal Williams
- General manager: Jimia "J.B." Brantley
- Head coach: Chris McKinney
- President: Robert Williams

Team history
- Cape Fear Heroes (2012–present)

Home fields
- Crown Coliseum (2012–2019)

League / conference affiliations
- American Indoor Football (2012–2014); Eastern Conference (2012); X-League Indoor Football (2015); Supreme Indoor Football (2017); American Arena League (2018–2019); Atlantic Division (2019)

Championships
- League championships: 2: AIF: 2012; SIF: 2017
- Conference championships: 1: AIF Eastern: 2012

Playoff appearances (6)
- AIF: 2012, 2013, 2014; SIF: 2017; AAL: 2018, 2019

The Cape Fear Heroes were a professional indoor football team based in Fayetteville, North Carolina. They last played in the American Arena League in 2019. The Heroes were owned by Barbara Spigner.

They began play in 2012 as an expansion member of American Indoor Football (AIF). The Heroes fared very well in their first three seasons of play, going to back-to-back-to-back AIF Championship Games, going undefeated in 2012. The Heroes finished as runner-up in 2013 and 2014. In 2015, it was announced that the Heroes would be leaving the AIF, and joining the X-League Indoor Football (X-League). In June 2015, the team's season was abruptly ended when they were suspended by the league.

They have won one conference title, in their only season playing in a conference, while finishing with the best regular season record in the AIF for three consecutive seasons. The Heroes played their home games at the Crown Coliseum.

== History ==
The Heroes are the fourth arena/indoor football team to be based in Fayetteville, following the Cape Fear Wildcats of arenafootball2 (which played from 2002 until 2004 after which they to Albany, Georgia and became the South Georgia Wildcats), the Fayetteville Guard which played in the National Indoor Football League (2005–2007) and American Indoor Football Association (2008–2010), and the Fayetteville Force which only played in the Southern Indoor Football League for the 2011 season, after which both the Force and the SIFL folded. Despite the AIF's purchase of the Force, the Heroes are considered a completely new franchise.

=== American Indoor Football: 2012–2014 ===
The Cape Fear Heroes were founded as an expansion team in the 2012 American Indoor Football season by a partnership headed by Barbara Spigner. Jack Bowman, who was also the director of the league, also operated the Heroes as president and general manager, while Charles Gunnings was named the head coach. The Heroes went 7–0 during their inaugural regular season and defeated the California Eagles 79–27 in the AIF Championship Game.

In the 2013 season, Spigner became the sole owner of the team and the Heroes went 7–1 in the five-team league. The Heroes returned to the AIF championship game and fell to the Harrisburg Stampede 57–42.

Following the 2013 season, owner Barbara Spigner took over as general manager from Jack Bowman. In December, 2013, Spigner named Josh Resignalo the team's head coach. The team finished as the top seed in the 2014 regular season and appeared in their third-straight championship game, losing to the Baltimore Mariners.

=== X-League: 2015 ===
On July 31, 2014, the Cape Fear Heroes announced that they have joined the X-League Indoor Football (X-League). After falling to 4–4, it was announced that the X-League had suspended the Heroes for the remainder of the season for not being in good standing with the leagues rules. Just days later, the Heroes announced that they would be leaving the X-League entirely and operating independently the rest of the season.

=== 2016: Suspension of operations ===
On August 23, 2015, it was announced that the Heroes would be the charter member of Supreme Indoor Football (SIF), one of the two leagues (along with the Continental Indoor Football League) which comprises the Indoor Football Alliance. However, after the CIFL effectively disbanded in January 2016 when the Erie Explosion (the last remaining CIFL team) announced they would take the season off and only one of the SIF's teams (the Buffalo Lightning) were ready to play a 2016 season, the Heroes announced that it would sit out the 2016 season on March 3.

=== SIF and AAL: 2017–2019 ===
Heroes' owner Barbara Spigner again relaunched Supreme Indoor Football (SIF) as a league with the Heroes as one of the charter members. They went on to win the championship against the previously undefeated Triangle Torch. During the offseason, many of the SIF members joined the newly formed American Arena League (AAL). On August 23, 2017, the Heroes also announced they would be joining the new league.

During their second season in the AAL, owner Barbara Spigner had health issues and had to step down from team operations. The team then suspended operations before the 2020 season. All team websites have since gone defunct.

== Statistics ==
=== Season-by-season results ===
League champions	Conference champions	Division champions	Playoff berth	League leader

Season	League	Conference	Division	Regular season				Postseason results
Season	League	Conference	Division	Finish	Wins	Losses	Ties	Postseason results
2012	AIF	Eastern		1st	7	0	0	Won Eastern Conference Championship (Stampede) 57–32; Won AIF Championship Game (California) 79–27
2013	AIF			1st	7	1	0	Lost AIF Championship Game (Stampede) 42–57
2014	AIF			1st	5	1	0	Lost AIF Championship Game (Baltimore) 44–45
2015	X-League			7th	4	4	0	
2017	SIF			2nd	4	2	0	Won semifinal (Bulls) 63–14; Won Championship (Torch) 30–24
2018	AAL			4th (Note: Qualified for the playoffs as the third seed due to the Georgia Doom opting not to participate.)	5	3	0	Lost semifinal (Atlanta) (Note: Hosted the #2 seed as the Havoc had home scheduling issues.) 54–61
2019	AAL		Atlantic	2nd (Note: The AAL counted all games played by member teams, including games against non-league members, and forfeits in the league standings for the 2019 season.)	5	3	0	Lost division final (Carolina Havoc) 22–60
Totals					37	14	0	All-time regular season record (2013–2019)
Totals					4	4	—	All-time postseason record (2013–2019)
Totals					41	18	0	All-time regular season and postseason record (2013–2019)

=== Head coaches' records ===
Note: Statistics are correct through the end of the 2019 American Arena League season.

Name	Term	Regular season				Playoffs		Awards
Name	Term	W	L	T	Win%	W	L	Awards
Charles Gunnings	2012–2013, 2015, 2017–2018	28	10	0	.737	4	2	
Josh Resignalo	2014	5	1	0	.833	0	1	
Chris McKinney	2019	5	3	0	.625	0	1	
