= Arena Football Association =

American sports league

- Formerly: Lone Star Series (2021)
- Sport: Indoor football
- Founder: Douglas C. Freeman
- First season: 2021
- No. of teams: 4
- Country: United States
- Headquarters: New York City
- Most recent champion: West Texas Warbirds (2021)
- Broadcaster: FloSports (streaming)
- Website: arenafa.com

The Arena Football Association (AFA) was a professional indoor football league based in Texas, Kansas and Mississippi, United States. The league began operation in June 2021 with five teams, known that season as the Lone Star Series. The league was founded by three African-American entrepreneurs and is "built upon the pillars of diversity, equity, and inclusion," placing its teams in underserved markets with populations from 200,000 to two million people.

As of 2023, the league's website was inactive and there have been no further developments.

== History ==
=== 2021 season ===
The league operated during 2021 as the Lone Star Series, after the West Texas Warbirds and Amarillo Venom, formerly of Champions Indoor Football (CIF), organized their own league. Five teams competed in the inaugural season: Amarillo Venom, Arlington Longhorns, San Antonio Valor, Texas Jets, and West Texas Warbirds. The Warbirds defeated the Venom in the championship game, 79–60, played on July 24.

=== 2022 season ===
As of the league's 2022 season, there were six teams: four in Texas, and one each in Mississippi and Kansas. The Amarillo Venom had also planned to play, before suspending operations in February 2022. After the first week, the North Texas Bulls were kicked from the league after their first home game for not meeting league standards.

The league's regular season schedule ran from April through June, with playoffs in July and a championship game scheduled for July 23. North Texas Bulls joined from the American Arena League but were expelled from the league after only one game. The league planned for the championship game to be played on board the USS Lexington, an aircraft carrier that is now a museum ship in Corpus Christi, Texas. This would not happen, as the AFA cited scheduling conflicts, and decided to hold a postseason "bowl game" style matchup instead. The Wichita Force beat the Magnolia State Spartans, 52–6, at the Wichita Ice Center for the AFA Cup.

==== Standings ====
2022 Arena Football Association
Team	W	L	PCT
West Texas Warbirds	6	0	1.000
Wichita Force	6	2	.750
Texas Jets	2	1	.667
Magnolia State Spartans	2	4	.333
Rio Grande Valley Dorados	0	2	.000

== Teams ==
Team	Home city	Home venue	Capacity	Head coach	Website
Magnolia State Spartans	Philadelphia, Mississippi	Neshoba County Coliseum	2,500	Dexter Allen	ms-spartans.com.footballshift.com
Rio Grande Valley Dorados	Hidalgo, Texas	traveling team	-	Bennie King	rgv-dorados.com
Texas Jets	Humble, Texas	Humble Civic Center Arena	7,500		texasjets.org
Wichita Force	Wichita, Kansas	Wichita Ice Center	1,000	Ene Akpan	wichitaforce.com

=== Former teams ===
- Amarillo Venom (Amarillo, Texas) — Played the 2021 pandemic-affected season in the Texas-based Lone Star Series and helped form the AFA, but went dormant before the start of the 2022 season after the owners put the team up for sale.
- North Texas Bulls (Fort Worth, Texas) — Joined from the American Arena League but were expelled from the AFA after one game.
- West Texas Warbirds (Odessa, Texas) — Left for the National Arena League after the 2022 season.
