= Rome Red Cats =

American Professional Football Team

General information
- Founded: 2017
- Headquartered: Suwanee, Georgia
- Colors: Red, white
- PeachStateCats.com

Personnel
- Owners: Kace Smith, Richard Masalia, and James Moreland
- Head coach: James Moreland

Team history
- Peach State Cats (2018–2026); Rome Red Cats (2026-present)

Home fields
- Classic Center (2019); Cumming Fairgrounds Arena (2020–2021); Atlanta Silverbacks Suwanee Indoor (2022–2026); Forum River Center (2027-present)

League / conference affiliations
- American Arena League (2018–2019; 2027-present)); Southern Division (2019); United Arena League (2020–2021); Elite Indoor Football (2022–2024); Professional Arena Independent Association (2025); American Arena League 2 (2026)

Championships
- League championships: 1 PAIA: 2025

Playoff appearances (2)
- UAL: 2021, PAIA: 2025

The Rome Red Cats are a professional indoor football team based in Rome, Georgia. They originally announced to play home games at Dalton Convention Center in Dalton, Georgia, for the 2018 season but were eventually made a travel-only team. They moved to Classic Center in Athens, Georgia, the following season. In 2026, the team moved to Rome, Georgia and returned to the American Arena League.

== History ==
The Cats were founded in 2017 by owner Tim Freeman, originally announced as members of the regional semi-professional Elite Indoor Football and coached by Mareno Philyaw. However, after the American Arena League (AAL) lost the Vermont Bucks, the league added the Cats to fill in for the lost away games. They were scheduled to play at least two home games at Dalton Convention Center in Dalton, Georgia, but were forced to be a road team due to constant schedule changes causing the team to be unable to secure the arena. Their first game was at the Georgia Doom on March 30, 2018. They finished the season with a 0–6 record.

For the 2019 season, owner Tim Freeman announced it had hired former Atlanta Havoc head coach Boo Mitchell as the new general manager and that the team had secured a new home arena at the Classic Center in Athens, Georgia, for the 2019 season. They finished second in their division to the Carolina Energy, ahead of the Carolina Cowboyz and the folded Georgia Doom, but the Energy elected to use its division champion clause to have a bye week instead of hosting a playoff game due to scheduling issues with their arena. This led to the Cats being to only division runner-up to not make the playoffs in the 2019 season.

Following the season, the Cats hired Tony Pierce as the head coach for the 2020 season. They then announced they had formed a new league, called the United Arena League (UAL), for the 2020 season along with former EIF team the Georgia-Lina Lions and a new travel-team called the Atlanta Pirates. The Pirates were replaced by another former EIF team, the Atlanta Furious, and the Cats scheduled their home games at Cumming Fairgrounds Arena, a covered outdoor arena in Cumming, Georgia. The 2020 UAL season was ultimately cancelled due to the COVID-19 pandemic.

The Cats won their first game in the UAL, and their first game at the Cumming Fairgrounds, 42–26 against the Georgia-lina Lions on May 8, 2021. The team went 4–1 for the 2021 season and lost to the Lions 41–53 in the UAL championship on July 17.

On December 21, 2021, the Peach State Cats were announced as joining the semiprofessional Elite Indoor Football for the 2022 season.

In 2026, the American Arena League welcomed the Rome Red Cats for the 2026 season.
