= Austin Wild =

General information
- Founded: 2017
- Folded: 2022
- Colors: Orange, black, sand, white
- Based in Austin, Texas

Personnel
- Owner: Keith Clay

Team history
- Cap City Bulls (2017); Austin Wild (2018–2019; 2021–2022)

Home fields
- Luedecke Arena (2018–2019)

League / conference affiliations
- Supreme Indoor Football (2017); American Arena League (2018); International Arena Football League (2019); American Arena League (2021–2022); West Division (2021–2022)

The Austin Wild were a professional indoor football team based in Austin, Texas, that played as a travel-only team in the American Arena League. They initially played in Supreme Indoor Football as a travelling team known as the Cap City Bulls in 2017 and scheduled for four games as travelling team as an affiliate member in the American Arena League (AAL) in 2018. For the 2018 season, they initially announced to play home games against local semiprofessional teams at the H-E-B Center, but they never played there and instead hosted their two home games at Luedecke Arena in the Travis County Expo Center.

After the 2018 season, owner Keith Clay left the AAL due to its members instability and being based on the east coast. He then helped to create the new International Arena Football League (IAFL) based in the southwestern United States. Seven other teams were added, including the Tamps-Mex Lagartos, Rio Grande Valley Dorados, and Mexico City Mexicah. The league finished the season with only three teams still active and the championship game was played in Mexico between Mexicah and the Dorados. They returned to the American Arena League for the 2021 season, but have since folded as of 2022.
