= Amarillo Warbirds =

Professional indoor football team

Logo

General information
- Founded: 2019
- Headquartered: Amarillo Civic Center in Amarillo, Texas
- Colors: Blue, red, white
- Mascot: TBA
- AmarilloWarbirds.com

Personnel
- Owners: Leif Kertis; Cathy Schick; Gary Meador
- General manager: Leif Kertis
- Head coach: Jimmy Johnson

Team history
- West Texas Warbirds (2020–2023); West Texas Desert Hawks (2024); Amarillo Warbirds (2026–present)

Home fields
- Ector County Coliseum (Odessa, TX) (2020–2024); Amarillo Civic Center (2026–present)

League / conference affiliations
- Champions Indoor Football (2020); Lone Star Series (2021); Arena Football Association (2022); Arena Football League (2024); National Arena League (2023, 2026–present)

Championships
- League championships: 1: LSS: 2021

Playoff appearances (1)
- LSS: 2021

The Amarillo Warbirds are a professional indoor football team based in Amarillo, Texas. They were initially based in Odessa, Texas, as the West Texas Warbirds with home games having been played at the Ector County Coliseum from 2020 to 2023, playing in a different league each year. The team initially intended to play in the 2024 incarnation of the Arena Football League but were replaced due to legal maneuvers by the West Texas Desert Hawks, who folded before the end of the infamous 2024 Arena Football League season. A revival of the Warbirds is set to play in 2026 at the Amarillo Civic Center as a member of the National Arena League.

== History ==
The Warbirds were the third arena/indoor football team based in Odessa, following the Odessa/West Texas Roughnecks (2004–2012) and the West Texas Wildcatters (2014).

=== Original Warbirds ===
Warbirds' original logo, 2020 to 2022. Both this and the 2023 logo are used for the 2026 revival.

Warbirds' logo from 2023.

On October 2, 2019, Champions Indoor Football (CIF) announced an expansion team to be based in Odessa for the 2020 season with the team planning to represent West Texas and use it in their team name. A name-the-team contest was held, with Warbirds being announced as the team's name on December 18, beating the "Warriors," "Law," "Outlawz", and "Thunder" in the contest.

The Warbirds' planned inaugural 2020 season was cancelled due to the onset of the COVID-19 pandemic. The CIF then delayed the 2021 season, but the local capacity and interstate travel restrictions in Texas led the Warbirds and the Amarillo Venom to withdraw from participating in the 2021 CIF season. The Venom and Warbirds instead launched the Lone Star Series, a series of games between the two CIF Texas teams and a few other Texas-based semiprofessional teams. The Warbirds defeated the Venom, 79–60 to claim the Lone Star Series championship.

Amarillo and West Texas officially left the CIF and turned their Lone Star Series from the previous season into the Arena Football Association (AFA) in November 2021. The new league also announced its initial membership consisting of former Lone Star Series member Texas Jets, former American Arena League champions North Texas Bulls, the dormant Rio Grande Valley Dorados, and the Texas Crude.

In 2023, the Warbirds joined the National Arena League (NAL), playing one season in that league. For that season, the Kertis ownership group sold the team to its former general manager Zack Bugg, who also owned a diesel services company; Bugg had initially resigned his GM position in a disagreement with its owners over the team's direction that February before being given a chance to purchase the team outright immediately before the start of the season.

=== Desert Hawks ===
Desert Hawks' logo (2024)

Under Zack Bugg, the team announced on July 18, 2023, via their Facebook page, that they will join the relaunched Arena Football League (AFL) in 2024.

On August 22, 2023, the team changed their name to the West Texas Desert Hawks. They were officially announced as the second team to join the AFL on August 31. NAL commissioner Chris Siegfried left that position to join the Desert Hawks as head coach. The NAL unsuccessfully filed for an injunction to prevent the Desert Hawks from playing, accusing the team of breach of contract for its departure from the NAL and its joining of the AFL. The Desert Hawks counterargued that it was not the same legal entity as the Warbirds and thus could not be covered under any contract to the former team. After the NAL was granted a preliminary injunction on May 6, the Desert Hawks under Zack Bugg issued a statement indicating it would defy the injunction and continue playing its AFL schedule. On May 10, 2024, the Desert Hawks and NAL reached a settlement to drop the injunction and allow the team to resume play in the AFL.

On June 18, 2024, an unnamed player and unnamed AFL official reported that the Desert Hawks have ceased operations, following the unannounced dismissal of head coach Chris Siegfried nine days prior. The AFL official indicated that the league was still discussing the matter internally before making any public announcement; the team had one further game on their schedule, a June 22 away game against the Salina Liberty, in which the Cedar Rapids River Kings played in the Desert Hawks' stead. On June 20, the league confirmed the Desert Hawks had ended their season early "for reasons that we will not disclose" but that it had not folded.

On June 21, 2024, owner Zack Bugg held a press conference announcing that he would no longer be the owner of the Desert Hawks nor any other arena football team and that he did not anticipate finding a new owner for the team. He blamed the fiasco on promises that Lee Hutton had made to the Desert Hawks and the rest of the league—particularly accusing Hutton of embezzling money that Bugg had put forth to have the Desert Hawks' second game aired on NFL Network—while praising his replacement Jeff Fisher and failing to answer why he continued to operate the team as normal for six weeks after Hutton's ouster, other than to maintain obligations as best as possible. In regard to joining another indoor football league, Bugg noted that none of the other leagues had the kind of robust paying television contract needed to provide shared revenue. Bugg also noted that the team was in a dispute with Ector County Coliseum vendors over concessions revenue and said that other teams that played at the Coliseum got to keep all concession revenue while the Desert Hawks did not.

=== Revival and relocation to Amarillo ===
On June 3, 2025, original owner of the West Texas Warbirds Leif Kertis and new Warbirds owner Derek Urias spoke to a local television station in Amarillo in which they revealed plans to bring arena football back to the city in time for the 2026 season. One week later, a Facebook page announced the launch of a new West Texas Warbird Football team to be owned by Kertis, Urias and Cathy Schick. This incarnation of the team will be based in Amarillo, Texas, and play at the Amarillo Civic Center. Kertis was the original owner of the franchise before he sold the team to Bugg in 2023. The announcement did not indicate the team's league.

Amarillo has had a long history with indoor football, with their predecessors the Amarillo Dusters and Amarillo Venom having played 18 consecutive seasons from 2004 to 2021. The Dusters, owned by Robert Reyna, had most recently been excluded from the NAL prior to the start of the 2025 season, and subsequently had their lease with the Amarillo Civic Center terminated paving the way for Amarillo natives Kertis, Schick, and Urias to bring the Warbirds to Amarillo for the 2026 season and beyond.

On June 30, 2025, the team unveiled their updated identity of the Amarillo Warbirds and that they will be rejoining the National Arena League promising to bring stability to indoor football in Amarillo. On April 23, 2026, the team's Facebook announced the departure of head coach Jermaine Blakely.

== Season-by-season ==
League champions	Playoff berth

Season	League	Regular season				Postseason results
Season	League	Finish	Wins	Losses	Ties	Postseason results
2020	CIF	Season cancelled due to the COVID-19 pandemic				
2021	LSS	1st	5	0	0	Won semifinal (Arlington) 70–6; Won Lone Star Series championship (Amarillo) 79–60
2022	AFA	1st	6	0	0	Did not play due to scheduling conflicts of AFA championship
2023	NAL	5th	2	11	0	Did not qualify
2024	AFL	6th	4	5	0	Did not qualify, withdrew after week 9 forfeit
Totals			13	11	0	All-time regular season record (2020–2023)
Totals			2	0	—	All-time postseason record (2020–2023)
Totals			15	11	0	All-time regular season and postseason record (2020–2023)
