= Supreme Indoor Football =

- Sport: Indoor football
- Founded: 2015
- Founder: Barbara Spigner (SIF)
- CEO: Barbara Spigner
- No. of teams: 1
- Country: United States
- Most recent champion: Cape Fear Heroes (1st title)
- Most titles: Cape Fear Heroes (1 title)
- Website: SupremeIndoorFootball.com

Supreme Indoor Football (SIF) is an inactive professional indoor football league based in the Southeastern United States.

The SIF was originally the creation of the Cape Fear Heroes ownership. During the league's initial launch in 2015, it was to be part of the Indoor Football Alliance, which would have also included a revived Continental Indoor Football League and begun play in 2016. When the CIFL revival never materialized, and the league had difficulties in finding teams to join the league, the Heroes suspended operations, effectively suspending the league as well. The league launched on its second attempt in April 2017. It played one season before its members joined the newly formed American Arena League. Commissioner Barbara Springer then announced she wanted to turn the SIF into a developmental summer league.

== History ==
The league's history began with two of its future teams having problems with the X-League. On May 31, 2015, the Cape Fear Heroes announced that they would be leaving the X-League entirely and operating independently the rest of the season while searching for a new league in 2016. In the wake of such recent events, the Marion Blue Racers would follow suit in announcing their departure from the X-League.

On August 23, 2015, the Indoor Football Alliance of the new Supreme Indoor Football league (owned by Heroes owner Barbara Spigner) and the revived Continental Indoor Football League (owned by Saginaw Sting owner Jim O'Brien) was announced. The Heroes were the SIF's first team, while the Blue Racers, Sting and the Erie Explosion all announced their intentions on returning to the CIFL. On November 4, 2015, the Saginaw Sting returned to American Indoor Football (AIF), leaving the IFA; the Blue Racers followed shortly after. With the departures of the Sting and Blue Racers, the Explosion were the lone CIFL representative in the Alliance. On the same day, the Heroes (still at that point alone as members of their league) held a press conference holding firm to their plans on launching Supreme Indoor Football, with a target of eight teams for its inaugural 2016 season. On December 4, 2015, the league announced its first new team, the Kentucky Knights, a team that had originally been announced as a team in the Texas-based North American Indoor Football.

The Heroes released their 2016 schedule on December 9, 2015; it included games against the Explosion, Knights, a team known as the "Maryland Big Red," Buffalo Lightning and Atlanta Sharks, the last two of which also jumped from AIF. The Lightning confirmed their participation in the Alliance on December 15. On January 18, 2016, the Explosion announced they would not participate in a 2016 season reducing alliance participants to three (Buffalo Lightning, Cape Fear Heroes, and Kentucky Knights).

On January 30, 2016, Supreme Indoor Football held a draft that included five teams, the previously mentioned three plus the ASI Panthers (formerly of AIF) and a team called "Western Pennsylvania" (presumably a last-minute replacement for the Explosion). Shortly thereafter, the Heroes released a revised schedule, removing the Atlanta Sharks and adding an unnamed team from Lockport, New York (taking the place of one of the Explosion's home games, an away game was still listed as being against the Explosion) and the IFA website added several previously unannounced teams (Cincinnati Bulldogs, Cleveland Saints, River City Raptors, and the Steel City Patriots). However, on March 3, 2016, league commissioner Barbara Spigner announced that the Cape Fear Heroes would sit out the 2016 season due to a number of factors, among them being financial support. The Lightning and Bulldogs each played some games independently in 2016, including one against each other with the Bulldogs losing 45–0 to the Lightning.

In August 2016, the league reactivated, this time as a solo league. Its members were listed as the Heroes, the South Carolina Ravens (a travel team affiliated with AIF in 2016), the Cap City Bulls of Austin, Texas, and the Coastal Outlaws of Savannah, Georgia. However, the Outlaws claimed to be part of a different league called United States Indoor Football and were eventually removed from the website in September. Replacing the Outlaws in September, the SIF website added the Triangle Torch (formerly of the AIF) as one of its members, but there has yet to be a statement made by the SIF or the Torch on their new membership. On October 5, a team called the Louisiana Cottonmouths announced on their own Facebook that they have joined the SIF; the Cottonmouths were originally a 2016 expansion team in the AIF that failed to launch prior to their first season.

The SIF held a press conference on October 28 officially announcing its return to organizing as a league with the management of the Heroes and the Torch. The SIF listed the Heroes, Torch, Bulls, Ravens, and Cottonmouths on their Facebook page. On November 5, the league added the Anderson Gladiators from the recently formed Arena Developmental League. On November 14, the league partnered with the new regional league, Elite Indoor Football, to play a cross-league schedule for 2017. The EIF was founded by the Savannah Steam after the demise of the AIF and includes four other teams: the Atlanta Furious, the Carolina Cowboys, the Florida Tribe, and the Roanoke Militia. In January 2017, the SIF added two more teams in the Georgia M.O.B. and Greenville (later changed to Upstate) Dragons. The Georgia M.O.B. (Men of Business) were previously announced as members of the Georgia Arena Football League and then Elite Indoor Football before joining the SIF. The Dragons were announced as being a travel-only team for 2017.

The league's schedule was announced as starting play on April 1, 2017. Prior to this, the Cap City Bulls played a non-league exhibition games February 11 against the Wichita Falls Nighthawks, losing 89–12, and March 9 against the Monterrey Steel, losing 47–24. While the Anderson Gladiators, Louisiana Cottonmouths, and South Carolina Ravens are still listed as SIF teams, they were left off the 2017 schedule and their social media pages have not been updated in several months; the header of the league's website now also includes the helmets of the EIF's Savannah Steam and Carolina Cowboys (whose helmet in turn is an unauthorized copy of the Dallas Desperados'). Neither the Steam nor the Cowboys have been declared a full member of the league. In early March, the Georgia M.O.B. were also removed from the schedules. The Heroes played the first official game of the season against the Savannah Steam (now going by Southern Steam) with a 58–0 win on April 1.

The first season for the SIF had each of the four participating teams playing a six-game season within the league. The Torch would end the season undefeated with a record of 6–0, the Heroes going 4–2, the Bulls going 1–5 and the Dragons with a 0–6 record. On June 17, 2017, the Heroes defeated the Bulls 63–14 in the semifinal game. The Heroes then defeated the Torch in the championship game on June 24, 30–24.

At the end of the season, the Torch left the league and then joined the newly formed American Arena League (AAL) on July 21. On August 7, the Upstate Dragons signed an arena deal in Anderson, South Carolina, and also announced they would be joining the AAL. The next week, the Cap City Bulls also announced they would be joining the AAL and changed their name to the Austin Wild. However, the AAL never confirmed their membership and they became an affiliate team looking to become full members. By August 23, the Heroes were again the only confirmed SIF member for 2018 and subsequently joined the AAL as well.

== 2017 teams ==
Team	Location	Arena	Capacity	Founded	Joined	Head coach
Cap City Bulls	Austin, Texas	Traveling team		2016	2017	Derrick Wallace
Cape Fear Heroes	Fayetteville, North Carolina	Crown Coliseum	10,000	2011	2017	Charles Gunnings
Triangle Torch	Raleigh, North Carolina	Dorton Arena	5,110	2015	2017	Chris McKinney
Upstate Dragons	Greenville, South Carolina	Traveling team		2016	2017	Kent Merideth

=== Map of teams ===
2017 SIF teams

=== Teams once listed as members ===
- Anderson Gladiators – (Anderson, South Carolina; preseason 2017) An expansion team that had originally announced as joining the Arena Developmental League. The team apparently ran into arena lease issues and did not make the 2017 schedule. Still listed as a member on the SIF website.
- ASI Panthers – (Reading, Pennsylvania; preseason 2016) Briefly listed as a member of the Indoor Football Alliance (IFA) and was one of five teams that supposedly took part in the 2016 SIF draft. The Panthers were members of American Indoor Football (AIF) for the 2015 season. The Panthers switched to a semi-professional outdoor fall schedule in 2016 and later rebranded as the Penn Panthers.
- Atlanta Sharks – (Atlanta, Georgia; 2015) Briefly listed as a member of the SIF in December 2015 despite cancelling their last five games in their 2015 AIF season.
- Buffalo Lightning – (Buffalo, New York; preseason 2016) Joined the SIF from the AIF following the 2015 season. One of five teams that supposedly took part in the 2016 SIF draft. Played four games independent of a league in 2016 after the SIF went on hiatus and joined the regional Can-Am Indoor Football League in 2017 as the Buffalo Blitz.
- Cincinnati Bulldogs – (Cincinnati, Ohio; preseason 2016) A regional semi-professional team and a member of the Mid South Football Alliance was briefly listed as a member of the SIF on the 2016 schedule. Played some 2016 exhibition games against the AIF.
- Cleveland Saints – (Cleveland, Ohio; preseason 2016) A recently folded team that had been members of the AIF in the 2015 season, briefly listed as a member of the SIF on the 2016 schedule.
- Coastal Outlaws – (Savannah, Georgia; 2016) A team that runs a summer developmental league called United States Indoor Football out of the Savannah Civic Center was announced as a 2017 SIF member. However, the team denied joining the SIF and were later added to the new Arena Pro Football as the Savannah Coastal Outlaws.
- Erie Explosion – (Erie, Pennsylvania; preseason 2016) Joined the revived Continental Indoor Football League (CIFL) after the 2015 season and then the league joined with the SIF to form the Indoor Football Alliance for the 2016 season. Was the last member of the revived CIFL before suspending operations just prior to the 2016 SIF draft.
- Georgia M.O.B. – (Conyers, Georgia; preseason 2017) The M.O.B. (Men of Business) were an expansion team originally announced as a member of the Georgia Arena Football League, then the Savannah Steam's Elite Indoor Football, and finally as a member of the SIF in January 2017. They made the original 2017 SIF schedule but were removed in early March before ever playing a game.
- Kentucky Knights – (Owensboro, Kentucky; preseason 2016) Originally announced as a team in the semi-professional Texas-based North American Indoor Football, one of many members added to the IFA prior to the league going on hiatus for the 2016 season. One of five teams that supposedly took part in the 2016 SIF draft.
- Lockport – (Lockport, New York; preseason 2016) A team with no name briefly listed as a member of the SIF on the 2016 schedule. Likely owned by the same owners as the Buffalo Lightning who had attempted another Lockport team for 2017 called the Lockport Lightning in the Can-Am Indoor Football League.
- Louisiana Cottonmouths – (Gonzalez, Louisiana; preseason 2017) An expansion team that joined that was originally announced to play in American Indoor Football in the 2016 season but went on hiatus. After being announced as an SIF member they did not make the 2017 schedule. Still listed as a member on the SIF website.
- Marion Blue Racers – (Marion, Ohio; 2015) Rejoined the CIFL (which joined the SIF to form the IFA) after departing the X-League following the 2015 season. Briefly joined American Indoor Football (AIF) instead before folding prior to the 2016 season.
- Maryland Big Red – (2015) A team briefly listed as a member of the SIF for about one month. Currently members of the Mid-Atlantic Indoor Football League, a semi-pro outfit based entirely in the state of Maryland.
- River City Raptors – (Preseason 2016) A regional semi-professional team briefly listed as a member of the SIF on the 2016 schedule. A team of the same name was once a participant in the outdoor Gridiron Developmental Football League in 2010.
- Saginaw Sting – (Saginaw, Michigan; 2015) Rejoined the CIFL (which joined the SIF to form the IFA) after departing the AIF following the 2015 season. Briefly rejoined the AIF instead before folding prior to the 2016 season.
- South Carolina Ravens – (North Charleston, South Carolina; preseason 2017) A team that was affiliated with, but not a full member, the AIF in the 2016 season. Joined the SIF as an expansion team after the AIF ceased operations but did not make the 2017 SIF schedule. Still listed as a member on the SIF website.
- Steel City Patriots – (Hamilton, Ontario; preseason 2016) A regional semi-professional team listed as a member of the outdoor Northern Football Conference was briefly listed as a member of the SIF on the 2016 schedule. The Patriots rebranded as the Niagara Spartans and planned to begin play in 2017 as a member of the Can-Am Indoor Football League.
- Western Pennsylvania – (Preseason 2016) A team with no name that supposedly took part in the 2016 SIF draft.
