= Georgia Doom =

American football team (2017–2019)

Logo

General information
- Founded: 2017
- Headquartered: Macon Coliseum in Macon, Georgia
- georgiadoom.com

Personnel
- Owner: Kevin Adkins
- General manager: Kevin Adkins
- Head coach: James Lal

Team history
- Dayton Wolfpack (2017) in-name only; Georgia Doom (2017–2019)

Home fields
- Macon Coliseum (2018–2019)

League / conference affiliations
- National Arena League (2017) (travel only); American Arena League (2018–2019); Southern Division (2019)

The Georgia Doom were a professional indoor football team based out of Macon, Georgia. They played their home games at Macon Coliseum. They started as a midseason road team filling in for the folded Dayton Wolfpack in the National Arena League in 2017 before becoming a charter member of the American Arena League in 2018. The team suspended operations during the 2019 season.

They were the third indoor team to play in Macon after the Macon Knights in af2 (2001–2006) and the Macon Steel of American Indoor Football (2012).

== History ==
During the 2017 season, the Doom played at least one game as the National Arena League's Dayton Wolfpack, a team that folded prior to the season and had various teams play under that name in the Wolfpack uniforms for their previously scheduled away games.

The Doom were then announced as an expansion team in the new American Arena League on June 27, 2017, and were coached by former Macon Knights and Shanghai Skywalkers head coach Derek Stingley. Stingley left after four games into the 2018 season. He was replaced by Gerald Dockery and eventually defeated the previously undefeated Richmond Roughriders 56–44.

Prior to the last game of the season on June 9, according to AAL president Jack Bowman, Doom owner Kevin Adkins apparently had notified the league his team would not participate in the playoffs, regardless of qualification. According to head coach Dockery, he and the rest of the team were not notified about not participating in the playoffs prior to the game being played. The Doom went on to win their last 2018 game, 48–42 over the Havoc, finishing in third place in the league with a 6–2 record, and was the only team to defeat both the league-leading teams in the AAL. The team found out the next day they would not be playing in the playoffs despite their record. AAL president Bowman clarified the Doom were still in good standing with the league and that the Doom ownership was focused on establishing a second team for the 2019 season as to their reasoning for not entering the playoffs. Owner Adkins did not initially make any comments on the reasons for not participating in the playoffs, but then claimed it was due to legal issues pertaining to the team's use of a logo similar to the video game Doom. On July 2, 2018, coach Dockery confirmed he would not return to coach the Doom in 2019. Dockery also claimed that some players had yet to receive their final paychecks, although Doom owner Adkins later claimed that it was due to incorrect address information for the players.

Adkins announced he had hired James Lal as the head coach for 2019.

The Doom suspended operations on May 9, 2019, partway through the 2019 season and took down its website. The team had a 2–3 record, including wins over the Carolina Cowboyz and Cape Fear Heroes, but had at least one previously canceled home game.
