= American Arena League =

U.S. indoor football league

- Upcoming season or competition: 2026 American Arena League season
- Sport: Indoor football
- Founded: 2017
- Founder: Tony Zefiretto, Jack Bowman, Tim Viens
- First season: 2018
- Owner: AJ Roque
- Commissioner: Kevin O'Hanlon
- No. of teams: 12
- Country: United States
- Headquarters: Matawan, New Jersey
- Most recent champions: Columbus Lions (1st title)
- Related competitions: American Indoor Football
- Website: https://www.americanarenaleague.com

The American Arena League (AAL) is a professional indoor football league that began playing in 2018.

The league was initiated by a merger between Arena Pro Football (APF) and the Can-Am Indoor Football League (Can-Am), although the AAL only claimed the APF history after the former Can-Am founder left the league. Teams from both leagues, new teams, and later teams from Supreme Indoor Football and National Arena League constituted the new league for its inaugural season. Since 2023, the league has operated as American Arena League 2 (AAL2), which was originally conceived as the AAL's minor league but has since effectively taken its parent league's place. In 2025, the parent league was announced to resume for the 2026 season onward.

== History ==
=== Arena Pro Football and the Can-Am Indoor Football League ===
Arena Pro Football (APF) was originally announced as the National Arena Football League in 2016 following the dissolution of American Indoor Football (AIF). The league announced their first three teams as the Birmingham Outlawz, Myrtle Beach Sharks, and Savannah Coastal Outlaws. The league changed its name to Arena Pro Football (APF) in September 2016 after the Birmingham Outlawz accidentally posted the NAFL logo of the proposed North American Football League as their league logo. They added expansion teams in the Cape Fear Wildcats and Richmond Roughriders. The league also added the Florida Tarpons and River City Raiders from the recently defunct AIF. The Central Florida Jaguars and Palm Beach Phantoms were also listed as members until both moved to the Jaguars' self-created league, Elite Indoor Football Conference. The Cape Fear Wildcats were later postponed to a presumed 2018 season. The Birmingham Outlawz later changed their name back to Alabama Outlawz after they failed to secure an arena in Birmingham. The Myrtle Beach Sharks announced they had joined the outdoor Gridiron Developmental Football League on March 7 and had left the APF.

The Can-Am Indoor Football League (Can-Am) was also formed from the remnants of the AIF when Tim Viens, the owner of the announced 2017 AIF expansion team Vermont Bucks, started his own league. With Viens serving as league president, the league added the Buffalo Blitz and Ontario-Niagara Spartans (both run by owners of established semi-professional teams, the Buffalo Gladiators and Steel City Patriots, respectively), as well as the Connecticut Chiefs (travel-only), Glens Falls Gladiators (travel-only), Niagara Falls Thunder (also operated by the Blitz ownership), New Hampshire Brigade, Rochester Kings, as well as Viens' Vermont Bucks. During the Can-Am's first few months, it added and removed the Baltimore Lightning, Cleveland Saints, an unnamed team in Erie, Pennsylvania, Lockport Lightning, and Reading Raptors as league members without playing a game.

Prior to its first season, the APF formed several agreements with other upstart leagues. The first affiliation was with United States Indoor Football, a summer league that was to play all its games in Savannah, Georgia, and operated by the Coastal Outlaws (the organization that also runs the Savannah Coastal Outlaws). On November 3, 2016, the league announced inter-league play with the Central Florida Jaguars' Elite Indoor Football Conference. However, all references to the EIFC were removed in January 2017 even after the Jaguars and Phantoms had attended the December 2016 league meetings as APF affiliates. None of these inter-league games were ever played and the EIFC played one weekend outdoors before ceasing operations. On November 14, 2016, both the APF and Can-Am announced an alliance with each other where the playoff champions of each league meet for an inter-league championship game.

The APF played its first game on March 10, 2017, between the Alabama Outlawz and Florida Tarpons, which Florida won, 42–18. After playing three away games, all losses, the Alabama Outlawz canceled their first home game. On April 26, they then announced that they had canceled the rest of their season, which had originally been scheduled as all home games. The Myrtle Beach Sharks appeared to have rejoined the APF mid-season; however, it was for away games only and the team called the Sharks were wearing the defunct Myrtle Beach Freedom uniforms. After playing all five home games to open the season, the River City Raiders declined to travel to play the Richmond Roughriders for their scheduled May 20 game. The Roughriders were able to secure an opponent in the Atlanta Furious, a team that primarily played in the Southern Steam's Elite Indoor Football (although many of those league's games were played outdoors). The only other away games the Raiders had originally been scheduled for was one of the canceled Alabama home games and against the Myrtle Beach Sharks. By the end of the season, the only remaining teams operating were the Richmond Roughriders and Florida Tarpons. The Roughriders defeated the Tarpons, 74–61, in the championship game on June 10, 2017, after the Roughriders finished the season undefeated.

The Can-Am also had significant inconsistencies in team members and scheduling. By the end of the season, there were only five teams remaining: the Buffalo Blitz, Glens Falls Gladiators (as a travel-only team, had a short winless season and were disqualified from playoff participation), Rochester Kings, Vermont Bucks, and the Tim Viens-owned Boston Blaze, a travel-only team that only played the second half of the season. The Rochester Kings finished their season undefeated with the Vermont Bucks and Boston Blaze each losing one game (Vermont lost to Boston, and Boston to Rochester). The Kings announced they were to host the Buffalo Blitz in the Western Division championship on June 3. The Bucks were to host the Boston Blaze in the Eastern Division championship. However, the Bucks later announced they were facing the semi-professional Central Penn Chargers, a team that primarily played in the Mid-Atlantic Indoor Football League, in their postseason game. The Kings defeated the Blitz 64–12 and the Bucks defeated the Chargers 46–6. The Bucks defeated the Kings in Rochester for the league championship on June 12 by a score of 61–41.

=== American Arena League ===
==== First season ====
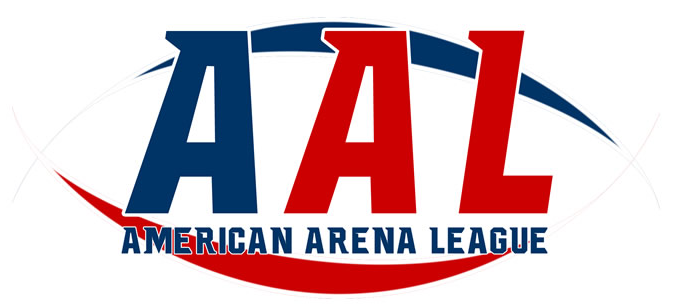
Original logo (2017–2021)

During the two league's first seasons, the Can-Am's founder Tim Viens announced on April 14, 2017, that for the 2018 season the APF and Can-Am leagues would officially merge and create the American Arena League, which the APF would later confirm. The championship between the two leagues was never played or referenced by either league again.

In June 2017, the now-merged league announced its inaugural members over its social media page. From the Can-Am, the league added the Boston Blaze, Buffalo Blitz, Connecticut Chiefs, Glens Falls Gladiators, Rochester Kings, Vermont Bucks, and the Central Penn Chargers (the team that played in Can-Am playoff game against the Bucks). From the APF, the league added the Florida Tarpons, Richmond Roughriders, and the announced expansion team Hampton Roads Riptides. The Roughriders had previously stated that they were looking to join to the Indoor Football League (IFL) or the National Arena League (NAL) and that they had not committed to joining the AAL yet. The AAL then deleted all references of the Roughriders from their social media posts within two days and the Roughriders later announced they had joined the National Arena League (NAL). By early July, the only teams that had not been deleted from their social media posts were the Bucks, Gladiators, Kings, and Tarpons. On July 13, the league added the Georgia Doom of Macon, Georgia. The Doom organization had played a few games as a travel team fill-in for the Dayton Wolfpack of the NAL the previous season. The league also added the Triangle Torch and Upstate Dragons after they previously played in Supreme Indoor Football (SIF), with the SIF's Cape Fear Heroes (the ownership group that operates the SIF) joining the AAL shortly thereafter. By September 13, the Roughriders returned to the AAL when the NAL had increased its criteria for new teams. On September 20, the High Country Grizzlies, formerly of the NAL, also joined the AAL.

By fall 2017, the teams began releasing their inaugural schedules and expansion teams, the Atlanta Havoc (owned by league president Viens) and the Carolina Energy, were added to the league. The AAL also added three affiliated teams that would fill in for home games of the league members and count for league games: the Austin Wild (formerly the Cap City Bulls of Austin, Texas, which had played as a traveling team in the SIF during 2017), the New England Cavalry (operated by the outdoor semi-professional organization out of Concord, New Hampshire), and the Savannah Coastal Outlaws (originally announced as an AAL member from the APF merger). In December 2017, another previously announced NAL expansion team, the Jersey Flight of Trenton, New Jersey, was added to the league. In January 2018, Tim Viens sold his first team, the Vermont Bucks, to solely operate the Atlanta Havoc. The new Bucks' owners then folded the team a month later and another new team, called the Peach State Cats (originally announced in the semi-professional Elite Indoor Football), was added but were only scheduled for away games. The Glens Falls Gladiators ceased operations just prior to the season, while the Coastal Outlaws would also never play an AAL game with many of their games replaced with the Carolina Cowboyz, also originally of Elite Indoor Football, to bring the league to twelve members and three affiliates to start the 2018 season.

Partway through the first AAL season, co-founder Tim Viens resigned from his positions within the league on April 14, 2018, and would also no longer be involved with his team, the Atlanta Havoc. The league then moved their website and retroactively claimed to have been founded as Arena Pro Football and changed its name when the Can-Am teams joined. The league continued to have scheduling issues and canceled games, leading to the Florida Tarpons, East Carolina Torch (formerly the Triangle Torch until they were forced to relocate), and Upstate Dragons choosing to end their seasons early. The last Can-Am team, the Rochester Kings, also appeared to have ceased playing league games altogether during the season. The Georgia Doom defeated both the league-leading teams, the Atlanta Havoc and Richmond Roughriders, but then chose not to participate in the playoffs. The Havoc went on to win the championship over the top-seeded Roughriders 58–50.

Shortly after the 2018 season ended, the Atlanta Havoc announced their relocation to Florence, South Carolina, as the Carolina Havoc and that they would host the All-Star Game at their new arena. The AAL then announced the game would be broadcast on ESPN3 with Mick Moninghoff as play-by-play commentator on August 25. The game was held and the Stripes defeated the Stars by a score of 34–29, but the game was broadcast on Facebook instead and all references to their ESPN3 announcement were taken down on game day.

==== 2018–2020 ====
On August 15, 2018, Richmond Roughriders' owner Gregg Fornario announced his intentions of creating a new league called Northern Arena Football (NAF). His Roughriders team, despite the possibility of losing its home arena in Richmond for 2019, was not initially planning on leaving the AAL with the NAF only having teams north of the Maryland-Pennsylvania border. The AAL affiliate team, the New England Cavalry, were the first team added to the NAF. However, by August 28, Fornario had rebranded the new league as Professional Arena Football (PAF) with multiple divisions, Northern Arena Football and Southern Arena Football, and the Roughriders were announced as part of Professional Arena Football on August 30, leaving the AAL.

By September 2018, the AAL confirmed five teams were returning for a 2019 season: the Cape Fear Heroes, Carolina Energy, Georgia Doom, High Country Grizzlies, and Peach State Cats (with the Cats relocating to Athens, Georgia, and no longer a travel-only team). The Florida Tarpons left the league and formed a new Florida-based league while rebranding as the Lakeland Tarpons. The defending champion Carolina Havoc later announced they would remain in the league. The Roughriders returned to AAL, now as the Wheeling-based West Virginia Roughriders, after Fornario's plans for the PAF fell through. On December 12, 2018, the league announced its 2019 alignment split into a four-team Northern Division and an eight-team Southern Division. The league also announced the return of the Jersey Flight, as well as the additions of the Carolina Cowboyz (now full-time members with a home arena in Pendleton, South Carolina), the traveling team Carolina Predators, the New England Bobcats (formerly of Elite Indoor Football), and the Burgh Defenders (Pittsburgh). The AAL then split the Southern Division into a Southern and Mid-Atlantic Division prior to the scheduled release. In January 2019, the league then added a Midwest Division composed of three teams that had been in the developmental Midwest Professional Indoor Football (MPIF): the Chicago Aztecs, Indianapolis Enforcers, and West Michigan Ironmen. Less than a month prior to the start of the 2019 season, the High Country Grizzlies ceased operations and the Chicago Aztecs withdrew for the season reducing the league to 13 teams. The Georgia Doom and New England Bobcats later folded during the season. There were many other canceled or rescheduled home games either due to arena issues or the away team not traveling.

On April 27, 2019, league co-founder and president Jack Bowman died after an illness and the league championship was then named the Jack Bowman Trophy. The Carolina Energy traveled to face the West Virginia Roughriders for the newly renamed championship on June 29, and the Roughriders won 55–29. After the season, Fornario again stated he was removing the Roughriders from the AAL. The Roughriders, as well as the Jersey Flight, were accepted to join the National Arena League (NAL) for the 2020 season. The league also lost the Burgh Defenders (removed from league), Carolina Havoc (loss of lease), and Peach State Cats (left league).

==== 2020–2021: COVID-19 pandemic ====
The AAL announced several new teams for the 2020 season including the Louisville Xtreme, Music City Fire, Pennsylvania Copperheads, Pennsylvania Union, South Florida Thunder (as a travel-only team), and the Tampa Bay Tornadoes. The league also merged with the semiprofessional Mid-Atlantic Indoor Football League, adding the Central Penn Chargers, Jersey Bearcats, Maryland Eagles, Reading Raptors, and Western Maryland Warriors. However, before the season could start, most venues were closed due to the COVID-19 pandemic and the season was subsequently cancelled. During the following offseason, the league lost the Louisville Xtreme and Tampa Bay Tornadoes to the NAL without the teams playing a game in the AAL.

By December 2020, the league had not confirmed any new teams and repeatedly stated it would not announce any 2021 season plans or teams until there were further developments in regards to teams being able to actually play due to the ongoing COVID-19 pandemic. However, several teams have announced they would be joining the league in 2021. In September 2020, a new team called the West Texas Buccaneers in El Paso, Texas, announced itself as a league member of a Texas-based division, along with several other potential cities for the 2021 season. New Texas teams called the San Antonio Gunslingers and Allen Tiger-Cats then announced they were joining the AAL. The Topeka Thundercats then announced they would join the AAL in a new Midwest-based division. In December, the league announced that some of the teams that had announced themselves had already been evaluated and were not members of the AAL.

The league then updated its website in December 2020 with a list of 17 teams in three divisions for the 2021 season, including Allen, San Antonio, and El Paso. It also re-added the Austin Wild and Tampa Bay Tornadoes, as well as new teams in the Chicago Power, North Texas Bulls, Mississippi Raiders, and St. Louis Bandits. Previously listed 2020 teams, the Carolina Cowboyz, Central Penn Chargers, Maryland Eagles, South Florida Thunder, and Western Maryland Warriors were no longer listed as members. The Music City Fire remained listed as a member, but were not scheduled to play any games. Allen was removed in January 2021 and replaced with a team called the Texas Takeover based in Fort Worth, which was also removed in February. The season started with two games on March 13, 2021. Reading left the league March 27 without playing a game. St. Louis withdrew from the season in May after two league games played citing COVID-19 concerns. Tampa Bay did not play its final three scheduled games.

The league announced it would not have a championship game and would instead name three division champions. The East Division champion Charlotte Thunder and West Division champion North Texas Bulls then scheduled their own league championship game regardless of the league's approval; the Midwest Division champion West Michigan Ironmen were not involved.

In June 2021, it was reported that league president and commissioner Tony Zefiretto had sold the league to the ownership of the Jersey Bearcats and Indianapolis Enforcers. The new ownership reportedly approved of the game between the Thunder and Bulls, which was won by the North Texas Bulls 60–43 on June 26.

=== Return of the AAL (2026–present) ===
On September 12, 2025, the relaunched AAL welcomed two former National Arena League teams to their revival; the Columbus Lions and Wheeling Miners. Both teams made their announcements on their social media platforms. On October 2, the defending AAL2 Champions Mississippi Wolfpack announced to move to the AAL. This was the very first year that the AAL will have a draft and was held at the Beck Center in Columbus, Georgia. Columbus easily took the title undefeated winning 11-0.

The Texas Wild Hogs and Montgomery Catfish were announced to join the AAL as the first expansion teams for 2027 along with the North Texas Steam. On July 3, after the conclusion of the AAL2 season, the league promoted the Ohio Legends, becoming the second team to be promoted from the AAL2 since Mississippi joined the season before. On August 10, after it was revealed that the Tri-City Horsemen weren't playing in the National Arena League, and it was announced that the Horsemen would join the league for 2027. On August 24, the Texas Desperados were announced as the third expansion team, and the fifth team to enter for the 2027 season. On September 1, the American Arena League released on their Instagram that an expansion team would be based in Rome, Georgia, which is named the Rome Red Cats. On September 20, it was reported by OurSportsCentral that the Rome Red Cats were a relocation of the Peach State Cats.

On October 9, the Jersey Bearcats moved to Morristown, New Jersey. On October 15, the Memphis Hound Dogs rebranded into the Memphis Blues and left the The Arena League to join the AAL. On October 16, the league announced the addition of the Virginia Haulers and returned to a divisional format. On October 22, Mississippi announced a move to the Landers Center in Southaven, Mississippi serving the Memphis area.

== Teams ==
=== 2027 AAL members ===
Conference	Teams	Location	Arena	Capacity	Head coach	Founded	Joined
Eastern Conference	Columbus Lions	Columbus, Georgia	Columbus Civic Center	7,573	Damian Daniels	2007	2026
Eastern Conference	Jersey Bearcats	Morristown, New Jersey	Mennen Arena	2,500	AJ Roque	2018	2020
Eastern Conference	Montgomery Catfish	Montgomery, Alabama	Garrett Coliseum	12,500	Juluis Gregory	2026	2027
Eastern Conference	Ohio Legends	Marion, Ohio	Veterans Memorial Coliseum	4,000	Charles Winters	2025	2027
Eastern Conference	Rome Red Cats	Rome, Georgia	Forum River Center	2,140	James Moreland	2026	2027
Eastern Conference	Virginia Haulers	Wytheville, Virginia	Hitachi Energy Arena	3,500	Josh Resignalo	2026	2027
Western Conference	Memphis Blues	Cordova, Tennessee	Agricenter Showplace Arena	4,500	Robert Redmond	2025	2027
Western Conference	Mississippi Wolfpack	Southaven, Mississippi	Landers Center	8,500	Dave Doeren	2025	2026
Western Conference	North Texas Steam	Denton, Texas	Lovelace & McNatt Families Practice Facility	TBA	Frankie Solomon Jr	2026	2027
Western Conference	Texas Desperados	Lufkin, Texas	Angelina County Exposition Center	6,950	Jermaine Blakely	2026	2027
Western Conference	Texas Wild Hogs	San Antonio, Texas	San Antonio Rose Palace	4,000	Brent Holmes	2026	2027
Western Conference	Tri-City Horsemen	Kearney, Nebraska	Landmark Implement Arena	2,746	Chris Reynolds	2018	2027

=== Map of teams ===
AAL team locations announced for 2027

=== Former AAL/AAL2 members ===
- Allen Tiger-Cats — Announced as a 2021 expansion team in a new West Division; removed from league website in January 2021.
- Atlanta Havoc – AAL in 2018; after one season where the team won the inaugural AAL championship playing out of Buford, Georgia, the Havoc relocated to Florence, South Carolina. After the season ended, the Florence Center unanimously voted to not renew the Havoc's lease for 2020 citing very low attendance and later the team folded.
- Austin Wild – Supreme Indoor Football (SIF) travel team in 2017 as the Cap City Bulls; affiliate AAL member during the inaugural 2018 season as a travel-only team with announced intentions to become a full member in 2019. Withdrew from the league after the 2018 season. The Wild were listed as 2021 AAL member.
- Austin Wolverines – Originally announced as an AAL2 Member for the 2024 season. Removed from AAL website due to the death of their owner. The team went on to play in the 8MIFL.
- Boston Blaze — Can-Am team in 2017; announced as one of the inaugural 2018 AAL teams. A paper franchise created to fill schedule dates by the owner of the Vermont Bucks, the Blaze, despite being listed among the teams included in the merger, had already ceased operations between the 2017 regular season and the playoffs.
- Buffalo Blitz — Can-Am team in 2017; announced as one of the inaugural 2018 AAL teams. Ceased operations before August 2017.
- Burgh Defenders – Played part of the 2019 season; canceled some away games and other teams chose not to travel to their venue deeming it unsuitable (it was part of a youth indoor soccer complex).
- Cape Fear Heroes – SIF team in 2017 and made the AAL playoffs in both the 2018 and 2019 seasons; withdrew from the league before the 2020 season due to the owner having health issues.
- Carolina Cowboyz – Joined as an affiliated travelling team in 2018, full member in 2019 based in Pendleton, South Carolina, at T. Ed Garrison Arena; not listed as a member prior to 2021 season.
- Carolina Energy – Played in the 2018 and 2019 AAL seasons; sold and rebranded to Charlotte Thunder before the 2020 season.
- Carolina Havoc – Played the 2019 season at the Florence Center in South Carolina after relocating from Atlanta; the arena did not offer the team a renewal and the team ceased operations.
- Carolina Predators – Played the 2019 and 2021 seasons as travelling team based in both North Carolina and South Carolina. Joined the newly formed American Indoor Football Alliance (AIFA) for 2022.
- Central Penn Chargers — Members of the semi-pro Mid-Atlantic Indoor Football League (MAIFL); played in the Can-Am playoffs with the intention to join the AAL in 2018. Dropped from the league before August 2017. Rejoined the AAL when the merged into the league for 2020, which was then cancelled during the COVID-19 pandemic. Not listed as member prior to the 2021 season.
- Charlotte Thunder – Played the 2021 season and then formed their own league, called Arena Professional Football League, for the 2022 season.
- Chicago Aztecs – Announced as one of the members joining from the semi-professional Midwest Professional Indoor Football (MPIF) for the 2019 season, but withdrew before playing.
- Connecticut Chiefs — Can-Am team that played one game in the 2017 season before folding midseason; for reasons unknown, the team was included in the initial list of teams.
- East Carolina Torch – SIF team in 2017 as the Triangle Torch in Raleigh, North Carolina; moved to Kenansville, North Carolina, prior to 2018 AAL season; after a 2–3 start to the 2018 season and continued arena issues, the Torch canceled their last three games; removed from the league website in November 2018.
- Florida Tarpons – APF team in 2017; played half their 2018 season in the AAL before they decided to stop traveling to away games and eventually canceled the remainder of the season. Started their own Florida-based league for the 2019 season, the A-League.
- Georgia Doom – Joined the AAL after playing as a traveling team in the National Arena League in 2017; ceased operations during the 2019 AAL season.
- Glens Falls Gladiators — Can-Am travel team in 2017; announced as one of the inaugural 2018 AAL teams. However, two weeks before the season started, it was announced that they would not play in 2018 and planned to return to the AAL in 2019.
- Hampton Roads Riptides — Announced as an APF expansion team in 2017; announced as one of the inaugural 2018 AAL teams. Dropped from the league before August 2017.
- High Country Grizzlies – Joined from the National Arena League (NAL) for the 2018 AAL season; ceased operations in February 2019 prior to the start of the 2019 season.
- Indianapolis Enforcers – Joined for the 2019 season from the semi-professional Midwest Professional Indoor Football (MPIF); withdrew from the 2021 season citing the COVID-19 pandemic and ceased operations before the 2022 season.
- Jersey Flight – Joined the AAL for the 2018 season after the original ownership failed to meet the financial obligations to join the National Arena League (NAL); was re-accepted to the NAL with the team under new ownership for the 2020 season.
- Louisville Xtreme – Announced for the 2020 season that was then cancelled due to the COVID-19 pandemic; left to join the National Arena League for the 2021 season, but joined the Indoor Football League instead.
- Maryland Eagles – Joined the AAL from the MAIFL when it merged into the league for 2020, which was then cancelled during the COVID-19 pandemic. Not listed as member prior to the 2021 season.
- Pennsylvania Copperheads — Announced as an expansion team for 2020; suspended operations in February 2020 after the owner had a heart attack.
- Mississippi Raiders – Joined the AAL for the 2021 season; left to join the newly formed AIFA for 2022.
- New England Bobcats – Joined the AAL for the 2019 season after winning the Elite Indoor Football's 2018 championship; folded after four games into the 2019 season and a 2–2 record.
- New England Cavalry – Affiliate AAL member during the inaugural 2018 season as a travel-only team with announced intentions to become a full member in 2019. Withdrew from the league after the 2018 season. Announced as the first team to join the new league called Professional Arena Football (PAF). The PAF failed to launch and the Cavalry created the New England Arena League.
- North Texas Bulls – Joined as an expansion team for the 2021 season and won the impromptu league championship game; left the next season for the new Texas-based league, the Arena Football Association (AFA), led by former CIF teams, the Amarillo Venom and West Texas Warbirds. The Bulls would be kicked from the AFA after one game.
- Peach State Cats – Originally announced as an Elite Indoor Football (EIF) team for the 2018 season, but joined the AAL as a travel-only team for the 2018 season when the Vermont Bucks folded just prior to the start of the AAL season; played in Athens, Georgia, for the 2019 season. Left the AAL to found their own league, called United Arena League, for 2020.
- Pennsylvania Union – Joined the AAL prior to the eventually cancelled 2020 season; announced it was leaving the league after the 2021 season citing the level of competition in the league. Joined the newly formed AIFA for 2022, the later ceased operations. Have since joined the AIF for 2026.
- Reading Raptors — Members of the semi-pro Mid-Atlantic Indoor Football League (MAIFL) that joined the AAL for the 2020 season via the announced league merger; 2020 season was cancelled due to the COVID-19 pandemic. Left the AAL for Elite Indoor Football (EIF) in March 2021 before playing any league games claiming issues with the AAL.
- Richmond Roughriders – Arena Pro Football (APF) team in 2017; AAL in 2018; after one season in the AAL, in which the Roughriders advanced to the championship game, they left the league when the owner started his own league, Professional Arena Football. The new league failed to materialize and the Roughriders returned to the AAL for the 2019 season as the West Virginia Roughriders.
- Rochester Kings – Can-Am team in 2017 and only Can-Am team to play an AAL game after the merger to form the league in 2018; after a couple of home games, all remaining games with the Kings were removed from the schedule; removed from league website in November 2018.
- San Antonio Gunslingers – Joined as an expansion team for the 2021 season; left for the NAL for the 2022 season.
- St. Louis Bandits – Joined as an expansion team in the 2021 season but withdrew after two games citing the COVID-19 pandemic; listed as a member of the newly formed AIFA for 2022 as the St. Charles Bandits.
- Savannah Coastal Outlaws — APF team in 2017; announced as one of the inaugural 2018 AAL teams but were removed from the AAL website in September 2017; re-added as an AAL affiliated travel team in November 2017 but do not appear to have ever played in the league despite being credited with a loss. Appears to have been replaced by the Carolina Cowboyz, formerly of Elite Indoor Football, on the schedule.
- South Florida Thunder — Joined the AAL as a travel-only team based in West Palm Beach, Florida, not listed as member prior to the 2021 season.
- Tampa Bay Tornadoes – Initially joined for the 2020 season that was then cancelled. Left for the National Arena League for the 2021 season, but rejoined the AAL instead and then did not finish the season. Joined the newly formed AIFA for 2022 as the Tampa Bay Cyclones.
- Texas Takeover — Briefly listed as a member following the removal of the Allen Tiger-Cats, but also removed one month later.
- Upstate Dragons – SIF travel team in 2017; played in Anderson, South Carolina, for the 2018 AAL season; after a 1–5 start to the season, the Dragons canceled all remaining games; removed from league website in November 2018.
- Vermont Bucks — Can-Am team and league champions in 2017; announced as one of the inaugural 2018 AAL teams but have since folded due to financial difficulties. Original owner Tim Viens sold the team after the 2017 season local ownership after Viens started another AAL team called the Atlanta Havoc. A new ownership group obtained the brand and re-launched the team in the semi-professional New England Arena League in 2019.
- Wheeling Miners - Joined the AAL from the NAL in 2025 for one lone season and came back to play in the NAL after losing to Columbus for the championship.
- Western Maryland Warriors — Joined the AAL from the MAIFL when it merged into the league for 2020, which was then cancelled during the COVID-19 pandemic. Not listed as member prior to the 2021 season.
- West Michigan Ironmen – Joined for the 2019 season from the semi-professional Midwest Professional Indoor Football (MPIF); left for the Charlotte Thunder's new league, the Arena Professional Football League, in 2022.
- West Virginia Roughriders – Won the 2019 championship and then the owner announced they were leaving the league for the second season in a row. Joined the National Arena League for the 2020 season.

== Champions ==
Year	Winner	Runner-up	Score
2018	Atlanta Havoc	Richmond Roughriders	58–50
2019	West Virginia Roughriders	Carolina Energy	55–29
2020	Season canceled due to COVID-19 pandemic		
2021	North Texas Bulls	Charlotte Thunder	60–43
2026	Columbus Lions	Wheeling Miners	49–46

== American Arena League 2 ==
American Arena League 2
- Current season, competition or edition: 2026 American Arena League 2 season
- Sport: Indoor football
- Founded: 2021
- First season: 2023
- Commissioner: AJ Roque
- No. of teams: 14
- Country: United States
- Headquarters: Matawan, New Jersey
- Most recent champion: Peach State Cats (1st title)
- Most titles: Jersey Bearcats, Wheeling Miners, Mississippi Wolfpack, Peach State Cats (1 each)
- Related competitions: American Indoor Football Alliance, Great Lakes Arena Football, Arena Football Association
- Website: aal2.com

After the 2021 AAL season concluded, four members of the East Division (Carolina Predators, Tampa Bay Tornadoes, Pennsylvania Union and Mississippi Raiders) announced that they would leave the AAL to form new league called Arena Indoor Football Alliance. The Charlotte Thunder and West Michigan Ironmen left to form their own league (Arena Professional Football League, later succeeded by Great Lakes Arena Football after the Ironmen took sole control over the league), the North Texas Bulls left to join the new Texas-based Arena Football Association, and the San Antonio Gunslingers were announced as an expansion team in the NAL.

In December 2021, the new ownership led by AJ Roque and Jermaine Sanders, the owners of the Jersey Bearcats, launched the new website for league following the completion of the sale from Tony Zefiretto. They then hired Kevin O'Hanlon as commissioner. They announced they would be launching "American Arena League 2" in 2022. AAL2 was delayed until 2023 and was initially to serve as the AAL's minor league, which was supposed to also relaunch in 2023, but by the time of the start of the 2023 season, only the AAL2 was active.

=== 2023 season ===
The 2023 AAL2 season saw the Steel City Stampede finishing first after a perfect regular season (6–0). The Jersey Bearcats won the AAL2's first championship after defeating the Stampede 39–18 in the league final.

=== 2024 season ===
In January 2023 the league announced that Wilmington, Delaware based Delaware Bull Sharks would be joining for the 2024 season. In September 2023 the league announced that two Dallas, Texas, based teams—the Dallas Falcons (from the American Indoor Football Alliance) and the Texas Hotshots—would join the league's newly formed Texas Division for the 2024 season. In October, former AAL member, Carolina Predators announced they were joining for the 2024. On November 1, 2023, the league added a new team for 2024, the Wheeling Miners, who were originally slated for American Indoor Football.

In December 2023, the league announced that the 2024 season was to feature 13 teams split into East and West Divisions, with teams playing six to eight games from April 13 through June 7, 2024. The teams included: The Jersey Bearcats, Maryland Eagles, Western Maryland Warriors, Steel City Stampede, Carolina Predators, Peach State Cats, Delaware Bullsharks and Wheeling Miners in the East Division and the Dallas Falcons, Austin Wolverines, Texas Hotshots, Waco Tornadoes and West Texas Warriors in the west division. The Falcons briefly assumed the identity of the Philadelphia Soul of the Arena Football League for one game in 2024, serving as replacement players after the head coach and most of the roster were unable to travel to the game against the Louisiana VooDoo. Wheeling announced its intent to depart for the National Arena League in June 2024, prior to the AAL2 playoffs. After the end of the regular season, the Texas Hotshots claimed that none of the league teams paid salaries to players.

=== 2025 season ===
On October 2, 2024, the AAL2 announced "Part 1" of their new teams for the 2025 season. The Georgia Indians, Mississippi Wolfpack, New York Smash (formerly the Syracuse Smash of the Empire Football League), Pittsburgh Outlaws, and Tri-City Rivergators were announced to be joining the league for the spring 2025 season. Also listed as league members were Great Lakes Arena Football champion Michigan Avengerz; the Avengerz were also claimed as a "travel team" by American Indoor Football, which counts GLAF flagship franchise West Michigan Ironmen as a member.

=== 2026 season ===
With the return of the AAL as a primary professional league, the AAL2 were reverted back to a developmental professional league with many teams remaining. On July 27, 2025 - the New Jersey Eagles announced to join the AAL2. On the same day, the Virginia Legion departing from the United Indoor Football Association and joined the AAL2.

=== 2026 AAL2 members ===
Teams	Location	Arena	Head coach	Founded	Joined
NORTH DIVISION
Michigan Avengerz	Detroit, Michigan	Detroit City Fieldhouse	Tom Menas	2024	2025
Mid-Michigan Grizzlies	Novi, Michigan	TOCA Soccer and Sports Center Novi East	Damian Daniels	2025	2026
Ohio Legends	Marion, Ohio	Veterans Memorial Coliseum	Charles Winters	2024	2025
Pittsburgh Outlaws	Triadelphia, West Virginia	Highland Sports Complex	TBA	2023	2025
SOUTH DIVISION
Carolina Aviators	Apex, North Carolina	Sofive Soccer Center Apex	Barry Marrow	2025	2026
Carolina Predators	Apex, North Carolina	Sofive Soccer Center Apex	Ralph Byrd	2018	2025
Tri-City Rivergators	Madison, Alabama	NOW Soccer Academy	Alvin Agee	2024	2025
EAST DIVISION
Maryland War Eagles	Silver Spring, Maryland	Wheaton Sports Pavilion	Matthew Steeple	2018	2023
New Jersey Eagles	Cherry Hill, New Jersey	Sofive Soccer Center Cherry Hill	TBA	2025	2026
Steel City Stampede	Whitehall, Pennsylvania	St. Luke's Sports Center	TBA	2020	2023
Tri-State Panthers	Mt. Laurel Township, New Jersey	Sofive Soccer Center Mt. Laurel	TBA	2024	2026
Virginia Legion	Sterling, Virginia	The Michael & Son Sportsplex at Dulles	TBA	2025	2026

The 2026 season also has multiple games scheduled against the Central New York Blue Devils (of the AIF) and the Ohio Blitz (independent)

AAL2 team locations for 2026

=== Champions ===
Year	Winner	Runner-up	Score
2023	Jersey Bearcats	Steel City Stampede	39–18
2024	Wheeling Miners	Peach State Cats	61-14
2025	Mississippi Wolfpack	Jersey Bearcats	32-29
