= 2015 Florida Tarpons season =

- Owner: Michael Taylor
- General manager: Michael Taylor
- Head coach: Michael Taylor
- Home stadium: Germain Arena; 11000 Everblades Parkway; Estero, FL 33928

Results
- Record: 6-2
- League place: 1st
- Playoffs: Won X-Bowl II 64-23 (Marine Raiders)

The 2015 Florida Tarpons season was the fourth season for the franchise and 1st as a member of X-League Indoor Football (X-League).

== Schedule ==
Key: Win Tie Loss Bye

=== Regular season ===
All start times are local to home team

Week	Day	Date	Opponent	Results		Location
Week	Day	Date	Opponent	Score	Record	Location
1	BYE					
2	Saturday	April 4	at Florida Marine Raiders	L 21-53	0-1	Lakeland Center
3	Saturday	April 11	at Alabama Outlawz	L 39-59	0-2	Bill Harris Arena
4	BYE					
5	Saturday	April 25	Florida Marine Raiders	W 51-37	1-2	Germain Arena
6	Saturday	May 2	at Georgia Rampage	W 37-35	2-2	Northwest Georgia Trade and Convention Center
7	Sunday	May 10	at Cape Fear Heroes	W 73-61	3-2	Crown Coliseum
7	Saturday	May 16	Alabama Outlawz	W 69-48	4-2	Germain Arena
8	Sunday	May 24	Georgia Rampage	W 92-12	5-2	Germain Arena
9	Saturday	June 6	Cape Fear Heroes	Canceled	6-2	Germain Arena

=== Postseason ===
Round	Day	Date	Opponent	Results		Location
Round	Day	Date	Opponent	Score	Record	Location
X-Bowl II	Saturday	June 6	Florida Marine Raiders	W 64-23	1-0	Germain Arena

== Standings ==
Team	Wins	Losses	Percentage
z-Florida Tarpons	6	2	.750
Rio Grande Valley Sol	5	2	.714
St. Louis Attack	5	3	.625
Bloomington Edge	5	3	.625
x-Florida Marine Raiders	5	3	.625
Marion Blue Racers	5	3	.625
Cape Fear Heroes	4	4	.500
Georgia Rampage	2	6	.250
Alabama Outlawz	2	6	.250
Corpus Christi Fury	0	7	.000

- z-Indicates best regular season record
- x-Indicates clinched playoff berth

y - clinched conference title x - clinched playoff spot

== Roster ==
2015 Florida Tarpons roster
Quarterbacks: 7 Chris Wallace; Running backs: currently vacant; Wide receivers: 1 Tyron Laughinghouse; 4 Tristan Purifoy	Offensive linemen: currently vacant; Defensive linemen: currently vacant	Linebackers: currently vacant; Defensive backs: 24 Terrance Jones; Kickers: 12 Rey Hernandez	Injury Reserve: currently vacant; Exempt List: currently vacant; Transfer List: currently vacant; rookies in italics Roster updated June 6, 2015; 5 Active, 0 Inactive
