= 2014 Savannah Steam season =

- Owner: Bobby Dammarell
- General manager: Jenny Dammarell
- Head coach: Shane Houser (fired April 9: 0-1 record); Bobby Dammarell (interim)
- Home stadium: Santander Arena

Results
- Record: 0-8
- League place: 5th
- Playoffs: did not qualify

The 2015 Savannah Steam season was the first season for the professional indoor football franchise, and first in X-League Indoor Football (X-League).

On October 15, 2013, the X-League announced the league would be expanding in to Reading, Pennsylvania with the Pennsylvania Steam. That same day, the team announced Shane Houser would be the team's first ever head coach.

After playing one road game as the Pennsylvania Steam, the franchise was sold by Missouri Sports Holdings to an ownership group led by Bobby Dammarell in Savannah, Georgia. The team played their remaining three road games as the Savannah Steam, while the four home games that were scheduled to take place in Reading, Pennsylvania were cancelled and counted as wins for the opposing teams.

== Schedule ==
=== Regular season ===
All start times are local to home team

Week	Day	Date	Kickoff	Opponent	Results		Location
Week	Day	Date	Kickoff	Opponent	Score	Record	Location
1	BYE						
2	BYE						
3	BYE						
4	Saturday	March 29	7:00pm	at Florida Marine Raiders	L 40-70	0-1	Lakeland Center
5	BYE						
6	Friday	April 11	8:00pm	at Alabama Outlawz	L 8-82	0-2	Bill Harris Arena
7	BYE						
8	Friday	April 25	7:35pm	Georgia Rampage	L forfeit	0-3	Santander Arena
9	Saturday	May 3	7:35pm	Marine Raiders	L forfeit	0-4	Santander Arena
10	Monday	May 12	7:00pm	at Georgia Rampage	L 44-66	0-5	Northwest Georgia Trade and Convention Center
11	Saturday	May 17	7:35pm	Alabama Outlawz	L forfeit	0-6	Santander Arena
12	Friday	May 23	8:35pm	at St. Louis Attack	L 20-84	0-7	Family Arena
13	Sunday	June 8	7:35pm	St. Louis Attack	L forfeit	0-8	Santander Arena

=== Standings ===
Team	Wins	Losses	Ties	Percentage
z-St. Louis Attack	8	0	–	1.000
x-Florida Marine Raiders	5	3	–	.625
Alabama Outlawz	4	3	1	.563
Georgia Rampage	2	5	1	.313
Savannah Steam	0	8	–	.000

- z-Indicates best regular season record
- x-Indicates clinched playoff berth

== Roster ==
2014 Savannah Steam roster
Quarterbacks: 1 Anthony Scott; Running backs: Currently vacant; Wide receivers: 10 Aaron Palmer	Offensive linemen: Currently vacant; Defensive linemen: Currently vacant	Linebackers: Currently vacant; Defensive backs: Currently vacant; Kickers: Currently vacant	Injured reserve: Currently vacant; Transfer list: Currently vacant; Refuse to report: Currently vacant; Rookies in italics Roster updated April 7, 2015; 20 Active, 0 Inactive → More rosters
