= 2014 Florida Marine Raiders season =

- Owner: Michael Mink; Robert Tannenbaum
- General manager: Michael Mink
- Head coach: Michael Mink
- Home stadium: Lakeland Center

Results
- Record: 5–3
- League place: 2nd
- Playoffs: Won X-Bowl I 60–48 (Attack)

The 2015 Florida Marine Raiders season was the third season for the X-League Indoor Football (X-League) franchise, and their first season in X-League.

== Schedule ==
=== Regular season ===
All start times are local to home team

Week	Day	Date	Kickoff	Opponent	Results		Location
Week	Day	Date	Kickoff	Opponent	Score	Record	Location
1	BYE						
2	BYE						
3	BYE						
4	Saturday	March 29	7:00pm	Pennsylvania Steam	W 70–40	1–0	Lakeland Center
5	Saturday	April 5	7:00pm	at Georgia Rampage	W 55–27	2–0	Northwest Georgia Trade and Convention Center
6	Friday	April 11	8:35pm	at St. Louis Attack	L 42–59	2–1	Family Arena
7	Saturday	April 19	7:00pm	Alabama Outlawz	L 38–44	2–2	Lakeland Center
8	Saturday	April 26	7:00pm	St. Louis Attack	L 47–49	2–3	Lakeland Center
9	Saturday	May 3	7:35pm	at Savannah Steam	W forfeit	3–3	Santander Arena
10	Friday	May 9	8:00pm	at Alabama Outlawz	W 44–38	4–3	Bill Harris Arena
11	Saturday	May 17	7:00pm	Georgia Rampage	W 75–23	5–3	Lakeland Center
12	BYE						
13	BYE						

=== Postseason ===
Round	Day	Date	Opponent	Results		Location
Round	Day	Date	Opponent	Score	Record	Location
X-Bowl I	Saturday	June 14	at St. Louis Attack	W 60–48	---	Family Arena

=== Standings ===
Team	Wins	Losses	Ties	Percentage
z-St. Louis Attack	8	0	–	1.000
x-Florida Marine Raiders	5	3	–	.625
Alabama Outlawz	4	3	1	.563
Georgia Rampage	2	5	1	.313
Savannah Steam	0	8	–	.000

- z-Indicates best regular season record
- x-Indicates clinched playoff berth

== Roster ==
2014 Florida Marine Raiders roster
Quarterbacks: 12 Matt Parsons; Running backs: 4 Levi Raines, Jr.; Wide receivers: 6 Reggie Ellis; 11 Jason Harmon; 3 Julius McClellan; 10 Adrian Smith; 1 Josh Smith	Offensive linemen: 66 Larry Califar III; 76 Adam Duckett; 55 Xavier Mckenzie; 56 Thed Watson; Defensive linemen: 96 John Brown; 99 Josuha Grier; 5 Kendrick Stewart	Linebackers: 21 Prince Hall; 23 Raytron Lamar; 15 James Lovett, Jr.; Defensive backs: 7 Maurice Francois; Kickers: 19 Jesus Cortez	Injured reserve: Currently vacant; Transfer list: Currently vacant; Refuse to report: Currently vacant; Rookies in italics Roster updated April 7, 2015; 19 Active, 0 Inactive
