= 2015 St. Louis Attack season =

- Owner: Andrew Haines
- Head coach: Chris McKinney (fired on April 23, 2-2 record); Pat Pimmel (interim)
- Home stadium: Family Arena

Results
- Record: 5-3
- League place: 3rd
- Playoffs: did not qualify

The 2015 St. Louis Attack season was the third season for the indoor football franchise, and their second in the X-League Indoor Football.

On April 23, 2015, it was announced that Head Coach Chris McKinney had been fired, and Pat Pimmel would be the Attack's interim head coach.

== Schedule ==
Key: Win Tie Loss Bye

=== Regular season ===
All start times are local to home team

Week	Day	Date	Kickoff	Opponent	Results		Location
Week	Day	Date	Kickoff	Opponent	Score	Record	Location
1	Sunday	March 29	7:00pm	at Corpus Christi Fury	W 34-16	1-0	American Bank Center
2	Saturday	April 4	7:35pm	Rio Grande Valley Sol	L 43-60	1-1	Family Arena
3	Friday	April 11	7:35pm	Bloomington Edge	W 47-45	2-1	Family Arena
4	Saturday	April 18	7:00pm	at Marion Blue Racers	L 29-33	2-2	Veterans Memorial Coliseum
5	Friday	April 24	7:35pm	Marion Blue Racers	W 48-23	3-2	Family Arena
6	Saturday	May 2	7:00pm	at Bloomington Edge	W 55-43	4-2	U.S. Cellular Coliseum
7	BYE						
8	BYE						
9	Sunday	May 24	7:00pm	at Rio Grande Valley Sol	L 65-47	4-3	State Farm Arena
10	Saturday	May 30	7:30pm	Georgia Firebirds	W 55-8	5-3	Family Arena
11	BYE						

=== Standings ===
Team	Wins	Losses	Percentage
z-Florida Tarpons	6	2	.750
Rio Grande Valley Sol	5	2	.714
St. Louis Attack	5	3	.625
Bloomington Edge	5	3	.625
x-Florida Marine Raiders	5	3	.625
Marion Blue Racers	5	3	.625
Cape Fear Heroes	4	4	.500
Georgia Rampage	2	6	.250
Alabama Outlawz	2	6	.250
Corpus Christi Fury	0	7	.000

- z-Indicates best regular season record
- x-Indicates clinched playoff berth

== Roster ==
2015 St. Louis Attack roster
Quarterbacks: 13 Mike McMullen; Running backs: 38 Zach Abron; 24 Darryl Grady, Jr.; Wide receivers: 22 Andrew Allen; 0 Aric Evans; 8 Christopher Head; 11 DeAndre Jackson; 1 Johnnie King	Offensive linemen: 51 Steven Davis; 52 Xavier McKenzie; 55 Anthony Jackson; 76 Travis Triplett; Defensive linemen: 6 Christopher Cooper; 74 Charles Henry; 5 Jason Null; 90 Bernard Quinn	Linebackers: 18 A. J. Burley; 3 Chris Caspari; Defensive backs: 23 Marcus Dickinson; 4 Bryan Lowery; 9 Brent McClendon; 7 Adrian Moore; 35 Kelvin Williams; Kickers: currently vacant	Injured Reserve: currently vacant; Exempt List: currently vacant; rookies in italics Roster updated April 1, 2015; 23 Active, 0 Inactive
