= 2015 Bloomington Edge season =

- Head coach: John Johnson
- Home stadium: U.S. Cellular Coliseum; 101 South Madison Street; Bloomington, IL 60701

Results
- Record: 5-3
- League place: 4th
- Playoffs: did not qualify

The 2015 Bloomington Edge season was the tenth season for the American indoor football franchise, and their first in the X-League Indoor Football.

== Schedule ==
Key: Win Tie Loss Bye

=== Regular season ===
All start times are local to home team

Week	Day	Date	Kickoff	Opponent	Results		Location	Attendance
Week	Day	Date	Kickoff	Opponent	Score	Record	Location	Attendance
1	Saturday	March 28	8:00pm	Marion Blue Racers	W 48-34	1-0	U.S. Cellular Coliseum	2,168
2	BYE							
3	Friday	April 11	7:15pm	at St. Louis Attack	L 45-47	1-1	Family Arena	
4	Saturday	April 18	7:00pm	Corpus Christi Fury	W 110-1	2-1	U.S. Cellular Coliseum	1,706
5	Saturday	April 25	8:35pm	at Alabama Outlawz	W 39-34	3-1	Bill Harris Arena	
6	Saturday	May 2	7:00pm	St. Louis Attack	L 43-55	3-2	U.S. Cellular Coliseum	
7	Saturday	May 9	8:00pm	at Rio Grande Valley Sol	W 2-0 (forfeit)	4-2	State Farm Arena	
8	Friday	May 16	7:00pm	at Marion Blue Racers	L 19-57	4-3	Veterans Memorial Coliseum	
9	BYE							
10	Saturday	May 30	7:30pm	Rio Grande Valley Sol	W 46-35	5-3	U.S. Cellular Coliseum	1,548
11	BYE							

=== Standings ===
Team	Wins	Losses	Percentage
z-Florida Tarpons	6	2	.750
Rio Grande Valley Sol	5	2	.714
St. Louis Attack	5	3	.625
Bloomington Edge	5	3	.625
x-Florida Marine Raiders	5	3	.625
Marion Blue Racers	5	3	.625
Cape Fear Heroes	4	4	.500
Georgia Rampage	2	6	.250
Alabama Outlawz	2	6	.250
Corpus Christi Fury	0	7	.000

- z-Indicates best regular season record
- x-Indicates clinched playoff berth

== Roster ==
2015 Bloomington Edge roster
Quarterbacks: 19 Drew Fendrich; 2 Haven Mosley; Running backs: 23 Andre Raymond; 4 Lyndon Rowells; Wide receivers: 12 De'Andre Eagle; 21 Josh Goffigan; 1 Joseph Green; 10 Devon Jones; 8 Marcus Lewis	Offensive linemen: 52 Josh Coyle; 77 Racshard Smith; 69 Eric Sopher; 72 Larry Westphal; Defensive linemen: 9 Antonio Ficklin; 97 V. J. Holmes; 96 Elisee Pompilus; 69 Cedric Young	Linebackers: 55 Nate Copeland; 11 Darrelynn Dunn; 34 Eric Tapley; Defensive backs: 3 Jeremy Caldwell; 24 Eric Fisher; 7 Dashawn Goodwin; 13 Dominic McDuffie; 6 Dominic Patterson; Special teams: 15 David Tomis	Reserve lists: Currently vacant; Rookies in italics Roster updated April 1, 2015; 26 Active, 0 Inactive
