= 2015 Marion Blue Racers season =

Fifth season for the indoor football franchise

- Owner: LaMonte Coleman
- General manager: Shavonne Coleman
- Head coach: Rick Kranz (fired May 1: 2-2 record); LaMonte Coleman (interim)
- Home stadium: Veterans Memorial Coliseum; 220 East Fairground Street; Marion, OH 43302

Results
- Record: 5-3
- League place: 6th
- Playoffs: did not qualify

The 2015 Marion Blue Racers season was the fifth season for the indoor football franchise, and their first in the X-League Indoor Football.

On October 22, 2014, the Blue Racers announced that former Kentucky Drillers owner and coach, Rick Kranz would be the team's head coach for the 2015 season.

After a 2–2 start to the season, Owner LaMonte Coleman fired Kranz, and named himself the teams interim head coach.

The Racers finished the season 5–3, but in a 4-way tie for 3rd place, causing the Blue Racers to miss the playoffs.

== Schedule ==
Key: Win Tie Loss Bye

=== Regular season ===
All start times are local to home team

Week	Day	Date	Kickoff	Opponent	Results		Location
Week	Day	Date	Kickoff	Opponent	Score	Record	Location
1	Saturday	March 28	8:00pm	at Bloomington Edge	L 34-48	0-1	U.S. Cellular Coliseum
2	Saturday	April 4	7:00pm	Corpus Christi Fury	W 50-39	1-1	Veterans Memorial Coliseum
3	Sunday	April 12	7:15pm	at Lehigh Valley Steelhawks	L 38-85	(interleague game)	PPL Center
4	Saturday	April 18	7:00pm	St. Louis Attack	W 33-29	2-1	Veterans Memorial Coliseum
5	Friday	April 24	8:35pm	at St. Louis Attack	L 23-48	2-2	Family Arena
6	Saturday	May 2	7:00pm	Florida Marine Raiders	W 51-41	3-2	Veterans Memorial Coliseum
7	Saturday	May 9	8:00pm	at Corpus Christi Fury	W 57-33	4-2	American Bank Center
8	Friday	May 16	7:00pm	Bloomington Edge	W 57-19	5-2	Veterans Memorial Coliseum
9	Saturday	May 23	7:30pm	Cape Fear Heroes	L 38-63	5-3	Crown Coliseum
10	Friday	May 29	7:30pm	at Nashville Venom	L 38-65	(interleague game)	Nashville Municipal Auditorium
11	BYE						

=== Standings ===
Team	Wins	Losses	Percentage
z-Florida Tarpons	6	2	.750
Rio Grande Valley Sol	5	2	.714
St. Louis Attack	5	3	.625
Bloomington Edge	5	3	.625
x-Florida Marine Raiders	5	3	.625
Marion Blue Racers	5	3	.625
Cape Fear Heroes	4	4	.500
Georgia Rampage	2	6	.250
Alabama Outlawz	2	6	.250
Corpus Christi Fury	0	7	.000

- z-Indicates best regular season record
- x-Indicates clinched playoff berth

== Roster ==
2015 Marion Blue Racers roster
Quarterbacks: 8 Jordan Boykin; 5 Les Obie; Running backs: 20 Ryan Walker; Wide receivers: 3 Alex Coleman; 7 Aric Evans; 10 Lynell Suggs; 21 Derrick Shearer	Offensive linemen: 79 Lance Cooley; 50 Bobby Gay; 75 Malik Hamm; 77 Ryan Smith; Defensive linemen: 11 Thomas McKenzie; 1 James Moreland	Linebackers: 16 Juan Rodriguez; 12 Korrion Wade; Defensive backs: 14 Justin Arrington; 2 D. J. James; 15 Charles Pugh; 6 Revelle Sadler; 4 Paul Sains; Kickers: 17 Cameron Lee	Injured Reserve: currently vacant; Exempt List: currently vacant; rookies in italics Roster updated May 29, 2015; 21 Active, 0 Inactive
