= Salomón Solano =

Mexico gridiron football player (born 1985)

UAT (intermediate)
- Position: Head coach

Personal information
- Born: 19 September 1985 (age 41); Ciudad Victoria, Tamaulipas, Mexico
- Listed height: 6 ft 3 in (1.91 m)
- Listed weight: 321 lb (146 kg)

Career information
- College: UAT (2002–2005)

Career history
- Rhein Fire (2006–2007); Detroit Lions (2007)*; Baltimore Ravens (2008)*; Green Bay Blizzard (2011); Rio Grande Valley Sol (2015); Lagartos de Tampico (2016); Rio Grande Valley Dorados (2019)
- * Offseason or practice squad member only

Salomón Solano Salazar (born 19 September 1985) is a Mexican gridiron football coach and former defensive tackle who is the current head coach of the Autonomous University of Tamaulipas (UAT) intermediate (under-20) team. He played college football at UAT.

Nicknamed Triple S, Solano played two seasons with the Rhein Fire in NFL Europe before spending time on the practice squads of the Detroit Lions and the Baltimore Ravens in 2007 and 2008, respectively. He subsequently played arena football with the Green Bay Blizzard and the Rio Grande Valley Sol. Solano also represented the Mexico national team at the 2011 IFAF World Championship.

Solano was awarded the Premio Luchador Olmeca by the Confederación Deportiva Mexicana in 2010.

== Early life ==
A native of Ciudad Victoria, Tamaulipas, Solano began playing American football at the age of six. His father, Baldomero, served as the head coach of the Autonomous University of Tamaulipas (UAT) football team, the Correcaminos UAT, in ONEFA until 2005.

Solano also played power forward on his high school basketball team.

== College career ==
Solano attended the Autonomous University of Tamaulipas (UAT) and played college football with the Correcaminos UAT from 2002 to 2005. He was selected to play in the Aztec Bowl in 2003 and 2004. In 2005, Solano recorded 39 tackles and five sacks. He later returned to UAT and earned his degree in business administration in 2012.

== Professional career ==
=== Rhein Fire (2006–2007) ===
Solano was signed by the Rhein Fire of NFL Europe (NFLE) for the 2006 season after impressing scouts at a November 2005 tryout in Mexico. He recorded one tackle in his rookie season.

Solano returned to the Fire for a second season in 2007 and was one of nine Mexican players on NFLE rosters – a new record. He recorded 15 tackles, one pass defended, and 0.5 sacks on the season.

=== Detroit Lions (2007) ===
After two seasons in NFL Europe, Solano was assigned to the Detroit Lions practice squad in 2007 as part of the NFL International Development Practice Squad Program. As a participant in the program, his spot was guaranteed throughout the regular season and did not count against the eight-player practice squad limit.

=== Baltimore Ravens (2008) ===
In his second year in the International Development Practice Squad Program, Solano joined the Baltimore Ravens practice squad for the 2008 season. He played in three preseason games.

=== Green Bay Blizzard (2011) ===
In November 2010, it was announced that Solano had signed with the Utah Blaze of the Arena Football League (AFL) ahead of the 2011 AFL season. However, the move did not materialize and he instead joined the Green Bay Blizzard of the Indoor Football League (IFL).

=== Rio Grande Valley Sol (2015) ===
In February 2015, Solano was invited to participate in an exhibition arena football game played between a team of Mexican All-Stars, mostly players from the Liga Extrema de Football Americano (LEXFA), and the Rio Grande Valley Sol, a team in the X-League Indoor Football (XIF) league. It was held at the Sol's home arena, State Farm Arena, in Hidalgo, Texas. His performance in the game caught the attention of the Sol head coach, Bennie King, and Solano was signed by the team for the 2015 season.

=== Lagartos de Tampico (2016) ===
Solano signed with the Lagartos de Tampico ahead of their inaugural season in the North American Indoor Football (NAIF) league in 2016. Located in his home state of Tamaulipas, the Lagartos became the first Mexican team to ever join a U.S.-based gridiron football league. In the season opener, Solano served as the team captain in their 55–8 win over the East Texas Timber Rattlers at the Expo Tampico, recording a sack in the first quarter. He also recovered a blocked extra point attempt and scored the conversion. With his family in attendance, Solano retired after the game. The Lagartos went on to finish the season as undefeated league champions, beating the Timber Rattlers in the title game.

=== Rio Grande Valley Dorados (2019) ===
Solano came out of retirement to play with the Rio Grande Valley Dorados of the International Arena Football League (IAFL), which were coached by ex-Sol head coach Bennie Hill.

== National team career ==
Solano represented Mexico at the 2003 and 2004 editions of the NFL Global Junior Championship.

Solano was called up to the Mexico senior national team for the 2011 IFAF World Championship. Mexico finished in fourth place after losing the bronze-medal game to Japan.

== Coaching career ==
Solano served as the defensive coordinator of the Mexico junior national team at the 2009 IFAF Junior World Championship. He then served as the defensive line coach of the "World" 19-and-under team that competed in the inaugural Team USA vs. The World game hosted by USA Football, which was held at Lockhart Stadium as an official event during the week of the 2010 Pro Bowl.

In 2017, Solano led the Correcaminos UAT juvenile (18 and under) team to a league title in ONEFA. The following year, he led the Titanes Tampico to an ARMFA juvenile championship. In 2019, Solano guided the Avispones del ITACE to a LUFAUAT juvenile title.

=== Correcaminos UAT intermediate (2022–present) ===
Solano was named the head coach of the Correcaminos UAT intermediate (under-20) team at his alma mater ahead of the 2022 ONEFA season. He was promoted from the position of defensive coordinator. A few days after the announcement, Solano was honored as one of the best players in school history at an event held by the university in conjunction with the national American Football Hall of Fame.
