= 2013 Corpus Christi Fury season =

- Owner: Chad Dittman
- Head coach: LaDaniel Marshall
- Home stadium: American Bank Center; 1901 North Shoreline; Corpus Christi, TX 78401

Results
- Record: 6-1
- League place: 2nd
- Playoffs: Won Semifinal 68-58 (Raiders); Lost Ultimate Bowl III 32-40 (Tarpons)

The 2013 Corpus Christi Fury season was the 11th season for the franchise, and their first as a member of the Ultimate Indoor Football League (UIFL). The team moving to the UIFL also changed their names from the Hammerhead to the Fury, and named LaDaniel Marshall the team's head coach.

== Schedule ==
Key: Win Tie Loss Bye

=== Regular season ===
All start times are local to home team

Week	Day	Date	Opponent	Results		Location
Week	Day	Date	Opponent	Score	Record	Location
1	BYE					
2	Sunday	March 10	at Missouri Monsters	W 74-37	1-0	Family Arena
3	Sunday	March 17	Georgia Rampage	W 58-47	2-0	American Bank Center
4	Monday	March 25	Sarasota Thunder	Cancelled	2-0	American Bank Center
5	BYE					
6	Monday	April 8	Georgia Rampage	W 44-36	3-0	Northwest Georgia Trade and Convention Center
7	Friday	April 12	Lakeland Raiders	W 64-58 (OT)	4-0	American Bank Center
8	BYE					
9	BYE					
10	Saturday	May 4	at Lakeland Raiders	W 50-36	5-0	Lakeland Center
11	Sunday	May 12	Missouri Monsters	W 75-56	6-0	American Bank Center
12	Sunday	May 19	Florida Tarpons	L 66-75	6-1	American Bank Center
13	BYE					

=== Postseason ===
Round	Day	Date	Opponent	Results		Location
Round	Day	Date	Opponent	Score	Record	Location
Semifinals	Sunday	June 2	Lakeland Raiders	L 68-58	1-0	American Bank Center
Ultimate Bowl III	Saturday	June 8	at Florida Tarpons	L 32–40	1-1	Germain Arena

== Standings ==
2013 UIFL standings (Note: http://www.theuifl.com/01/UIFLStats/confsked.htm)
Team	W	L	PCT	PF	PA	STK
y-Florida Tarpons	5	1	.833	304	187	W4
x-Corpus Christi Fury	6	1	.857	431	345	L1
x-Lakeland Raiders	6	3	.667	573	232	W1
Missouri Monsters	5	5	.500	459	424	W1
Georgia Rampage	3	5	.375	318	343	W1
Sarasota Thunder	0	3	.000	0	230	L3

y - clinched conference title x - clinched playoff spot

== Roster ==
2013 Corpus Christi Fury roster
Quarterbacks: 12 Robert Kent; Running backs: currently vacant; Wide receivers: 7 Joel Lemons; 4 Timon Marshall	Offensive linemen: currently vacant; Defensive linemen: currently vacant	Linebackers: currently vacant; Defensive backs: currently vacant; Kickers: currently vacant	Injury Reserve: currently vacant; Exempt List: currently vacant; Transfer List: currently vacant; rookies in italics Roster updated May 24, 2013; 3 Active, 0 Inactive → More rosters
