= 2013 Missouri Monsters season =

- Owner: Andrew Haines
- General manager: Andrew Haines
- Head coach: Andrew Parker (fired March 26: 0-2 record); Martino Theus (interim)
- Home stadium: Family Arena; 2002 Arena Parkway; St. Charles, MO 63303

Results
- Record: 5-5
- League place: 4th
- Playoffs: did not qualify

The 2013 Missouri Monsters season was the first season for the professional indoor football franchise and first in the Ultimate Indoor Football League (UIFL). One of six teams that competed in the UIFL for the 2013 season.

Led by interim head coach Martino Theus, the Monsters played their home games at the Family Arena in St. Charles, Missouri.

== Schedule ==
Key: Win Tie Loss Bye

=== Regular season ===
All start times are local to home team

Week	Day	Date	Opponent	Results		Location
Week	Day	Date	Opponent	Score	Record	Location
1	BYE					
2	Sunday	March 10	Corpus Christi Fury	L 37-74	0-1	Family Arena
3	BYE					
4	Monday	March 25	at Georgia Rampage	L 18-25	0-2	Northwest Georgia Trade and Convention Center
5	Monday	April 1	Windy City Hitmen	W 74-14	1-2	Family Arena
6	Saturday	April 6	Marion Blue Racers	W 47-39	2-2	Family Arena
7	Saturday	April 13	Florida Tarpons	L 20-43	2-3	Family Arena
8	BYE					
9	Saturday	April 28	Georgia Rampage	W 65–59 (OT)	3-3	Family Arena
10	Friday	May 3	Atlanta Vipers	W 80-8	4-3	Family Arena
11	Sunday	May 12	at Corpus Christi Fury	L 56-75	4-4	American Bank Center
12	Sunday	May 19	at Lakeland Raiders	L 6-59	4-5	Lakeland Center
13	Friday	May 24	Gateway Gators	W 52-28	5-5	Family Arena

== Standings ==
2013 UIFL standings (Note: http://www.theuifl.com/01/UIFLStats/confsked.htm)
Team	W	L	PCT	PF	PA	STK
y-Florida Tarpons	5	1	.833	304	187	W4
x-Corpus Christi Fury	6	1	.857	431	345	L1
x-Lakeland Raiders	6	3	.667	573	232	W1
Missouri Monsters	5	5	.500	459	424	W1
Georgia Rampage	3	5	.375	318	343	W1
Sarasota Thunder	0	3	.000	0	230	L3

y - clinched conference title x - clinched playoff spot

== Roster ==
2013 Missouri Monsters roster
Quarterbacks: 15 Tavares Woodley; Running backs: 24 Dello Davis; Wide receivers: 11 Aric Evans; 9 Gary Johnson; -- Easton Knott	Offensive linemen: -- Joseph Burton; -- Jay Carmack; 74 K. C. Giger; 55 Anthony Jackson; -- Derek Solom; Defensive linemen: -- Chris Cooper; 90 Bernard Quinn; 3 Claude Wroten	Linebackers: currently vacant; Defensive backs: 7 Kevin Brown; 2 Randall Burden; 1 Robert Elliott; -- Moriano Lardge; 20 DeQwan Young; Kickers: currently vacant	Injury Reserve Exempt List: currently vacant; Transfer List: currently vacant; rookies in italics Roster updated May 24, 2013; 18 Active, 0 Inactive → More rosters
