= 2014 X-League Indoor Football season =

- League: X-League Indoor Football
- Sport: Indoor football
- Duration: March 3, 2014 - June 8, 2014
- Season champions: St. Louis Attack
- Season MVP: Levi Raines, Jr. (Florida)

X-Bowl I
- Champions: Florida Marine Raiders
- Runners-up: St. Louis Attack
- Finals MVP: Levi Raines, Jr.

XLIF seasons

This is the inaugural season for X-League Indoor Football.

== Standings ==
| Team | Wins | Losses | Ties | Percentage |
|---|---|---|---|---|
| z-St. Louis Attack | 8 | 0 | – | 1.000 |
| x-Florida Marine Raiders | 5 | 3 | – | .625 |
| Alabama Outlawz | 4 | 3 | 1 | .563 |
| Georgia Rampage | 2 | 5 | 1 | .313 |
| Savannah Steam | 0 | 8 | – | .000 |

- z-Indicates best regular season record
- x-Indicates clinched playoff berth

== Schedule ==
| Date | Away team | Home team | Time | Arena | Result |
|---|---|---|---|---|---|
| Monday March 3, 2014 | Alabama Outlawz | Georgia Rampage | 7:00p | Northwest Georgia Trade and Convention Center | 44-43 |
| Saturday March 29, 2014 | Pennsylvania Steam | Florida Marine Raiders | 7:00p | Lakeland Center | 40-70 |
| Sunday March 30, 2014 | Georgia Rampage | St. Louis Attack | 7:05p | Family Arena | 34-46 |
| Thursday April 3, 2014 | Florida Marine Raiders | Georgia Rampage | 7:00p | Northwest Georgia Trade and Convention Center | 55-27 |
| Friday April 4, 2014 | St. Louis Attack | Alabama Outlawz | 8:00p | Bill Harris Arena | 58-39 |
| Friday April 11, 2014 | Savannah Steam | Alabama Outlawz | 8:00p | Bill Harris Arena | 8-82 |
| Friday April 11, 2014 | Florida Marine Raiders | St. Louis Attack | 8:35p | Family Arena | 42-59 |
| Saturday April 19, 2014 | Alabama Outlawz | Florida Marine Raiders | 7:00p | Lakeland Center | 44-38 |
| Saturday April 19, 2014 | St. Louis Attack | Georgia Rampage | 7:00p | Northwest Georgia Trade and Convention Center | 46-14 |
| Friday April 25, 2014 | Georgia Rampage | Savannah Steam | 7:35p | Santander Arena | 55-25 |
| Friday April 25, 2014 | Chattahoochee Vipers (NL) | Alabama Outlawz | 8:00p | Bill Harris Arena | 35-65 |
| Saturday April 26, 2014 | St. Louis Attack | Florida Marine Raiders | 7:00p | Lakeland Center | 49-47 |
| Friday May 2, 2014 | Alabama Outlawz | St. Louis Attack | 8:35p | Family Arena | 65-76 |
| Saturday May 3, 2014 | Florida Marine Raiders | Savannah Steam | 7:35p | Santander Arena | 55-25 |
| Friday May 9, 2014 | Florida Marine Raiders | Alabama Outlawz | 8:00p | Bill Harris Arena | 44-38 |
| Saturday May 10, 2014 | Gateway Hawks (NL) | St. Louis Attack | 8:35p | Family Arena | 1-71 |
| Monday May 12, 2014 | Savannah Steam | Georgia Rampage | 7:00p | Northwest Georgia Trade and Convention Center | 44-66 |
| Saturday May 17, 2014 | Georgia Rampage | Florida Marine Raiders | 7:00p | Lakeland Center | 23-75 |
| Saturday May 17, 2014 | Alabama Outlawz | Savannah Steam | 7:35p | Santander Arena | 55-25 |
| Friday May 23, 2014 | Georgia Rampage | Alabama Outlawz | 8:00p | Bill Harris Arena | 7-7 |
| Friday May 23, 2014 | Savannah Steam | St. Louis Attack | 8:35p | Family Arena | 20-84 |
| Saturday May 24, 2014 | Orlando Rage (NL) | Florida Marine Raiders | 7:00p | Lakeland Center | 31-57 |
| Sunday June 8, 2014 | St. Louis Attack | Savannah Steam | 7:35p | Santander Arena | 55-25 |
X-Bowl I
| Saturday June 14, 2014 | Florida Marine Raiders | St. Louis Attack | 8:05p | Family Arena | 60-48 |

*All Game times are Eastern Standard Time

== Playoffs ==
| X-Bowl I |
| 2 | Florida Marine | 60 |
| 1 | St. Louis | 48 |
