= 2013 Florida Tarpons season =

Indoor football team season

- Owner: Michael Taylor
- General manager: Michael Taylor
- Head coach: Michael Taylor
- Home stadium: Germain Arena; 11000 Everblades Parkway; Estero, FL 33928

Results
- Record: 5-1
- League place: 1st
- Playoffs: Won Ultimate Bowl III 58-68 (Fury)

The 2013 UIFL season was the second season for the Florida Tarpons in the Ultimate Indoor Football League.

== Schedule ==
Key: Win Tie Loss Bye

=== Regular season ===
All start times are local to home team

Week	Day	Date	Opponent	Results		Location
Week	Day	Date	Opponent	Score	Record	Location
1	BYE					
2	BYE					
3	Sunday	March 18	Sarasota Thunder	Cancelled	0-0	Germain Arena
4	Sunday	March 24	Lakeland Raiders	W 41-36	1-0	Germain Arena
5	Saturday	March 30	at Lakeland Raiders	L 40-52	1-1	Lakeland Center
6	BYE					
7	Saturday	April 13	at Missouri Monsters	W 43-20	2-1	Family Arena
8	Friday	April 19	Georgia Rampage	W 43-13	3-1	Germain Arena
9	Sunday	April 28	Sarasota Thunder	W 62-0	4-1	Germain Arena
10	BYE					
11	Friday	May 17	Sarasota Thunder	Cancelled	4-1	Germain Arena
12	Sunday	May 19	at Corpus Christi Fury	W 75-66	5-1	American Bank Center
13	BYE					

=== Postseason ===
Round	Day	Date	Opponent	Results		Location
Round	Day	Date	Opponent	Score	Record	Location
Semifinals	BYE					
Ultimate Bowl III	Saturday	June 8	Corpus Christi Fury	W 40-32	1-0	Germain Arena

== Standings ==
2013 UIFL standings (Note: http://www.theuifl.com/01/UIFLStats/confsked.htm)
Team	W	L	PCT	PF	PA	STK
y-Florida Tarpons	5	1	.833	304	187	W4
x-Corpus Christi Fury	6	1	.857	431	345	L1
x-Lakeland Raiders	6	3	.667	573	232	W1
Missouri Monsters	5	5	.500	459	424	W1
Georgia Rampage	3	5	.375	318	343	W1
Sarasota Thunder	0	3	.000	0	230	L3

y - clinched conference title x - clinched playoff spot

== Roster ==
2013 Florida Tarpons roster
Quarterbacks: 7 Chris Wallace; Running backs: currently vacant; Wide receivers: 5 Carlos Singleton	Offensive linemen: currently vacant; Defensive linemen: currently vacant; Linebackers: currently vacant	Defensive backs: currently vacant; Kickers: currently vacant	Injured Reserve: currently vacant; Exempt List: currently vacant; Practice squad: currently vacant; rookies in italics Roster updated June 8, 2013; 2 Active, 0 Inactive, 0 PS
