= 2013 Georgia Rampage season =

American indoor football team season

- Owner: Kacee Smith; Amer W. Award
- General manager: Kacee Smith
- Head coach: Mark Bramblett
- Home stadium: Northwest Georgia Trade and Convention Center; 2211 Dug Gap Battle Road; Dalton, GA 30720

Results
- Record: 3-5
- League place: 5th
- Playoffs: did not qualify

The 2013 Georgia Rampage season was the second season for the professional indoor football franchise and second in the Ultimate Indoor Football League (UIFL). One of six teams that competed in the UIFL for the 2013 season.

Led by head coach Mark Bramblett, the Rampage played their home games at the Northwest Georgia Trade and Convention Center in Dalton, Georgia.

== Schedule ==
Key: Win Tie Loss Bye

=== Regular season ===
All start times are local to home team

| Week | Day | Date | Opponent | Results | | Location |
| Week | Day | Date | Opponent | Score | Record | Location |
|---|---|---|---|---|---|---|
| 1 | Saturday | March 4 | Lakeland Raiders | L 25-74 | 0-1 | Northwest Georgia Trade and Convention Center |
| 2 | BYE | | | | | |
| 3 | Friday | March 17 | at Corpus Christi Fury | L 47-58 | 0-2 | American Bank Center |
| 4 | Monday | March 25 | Missouri Monsters | W 25-18 | 1-2 | Northwest Georgia Trade and Convention Center |
| 5 | Monday | April 1 | Georgia Riverdogs | W 58-19 | 2-2 | Northwest Georgia Trade and Convention Center |
| 6 | Monday | April 8 | Corpus Christi Fury | L 36-44 | 2-3 | Northwest Georgia Trade and Convention Center |
| 7 | BYE | | | | | |
| 8 | Saturday | April 19 | at Florida Tarpons | L 14-43 | 2-4 | Germain Arena |
| 9 | Saturday | April 28 | at Missouri Monsters | L 59–65 (OT) | 2-5 | Family Arena |
| 10 | BYE | | | | | |
| 11 | Monday | May 13 | Chattahoochee Valley Vipers | W 54-22 | 3-5 | Northwest Georgia Trade and Convention Center |
| 12 | BYE | | | | | |
| 13 | BYE | | | | | |

== Standings ==
2013 UIFL standings (Note: http://www.theuifl.com/01/UIFLStats/confsked.htm)
| Team | W | L | PCT | PF | PA | STK |
|---|---|---|---|---|---|---|
| y-Florida Tarpons | 5 | 1 | .833 | 304 | 187 | W4 |
| x-Corpus Christi Fury | 6 | 1 | .857 | 431 | 345 | L1 |
| x-Lakeland Raiders | 6 | 3 | .667 | 573 | 232 | W1 |
| Missouri Monsters | 5 | 5 | .500 | 459 | 424 | W1 |
| Georgia Rampage | 3 | 5 | .375 | 318 | 343 | W1 |
| Sarasota Thunder | 0 | 3 | .000 | 0 | 230 | L3 |

y - clinched conference title x - clinched playoff spot

== Roster ==
2013 Georgia Rampage roster
| Quarterbacks: -- Marcus Jones; -- Joel Statham; Running backs: -- Brad Lester; Wide receivers: 3 C. J. Dial; -- Michael Emerson; 12 Dallas Walker | Offensive linemen: -- Steven Leonard; -- Kenneth Peaks; Defensive linemen: -- Evan Bostic; -- Raibonne Charles; -- James Pratt | Linebackers: currently vacant; Defensive backs: -- Darius Pettigrew; -- Andre Powell; -- Marcus Williams; Kickers: currently vacant | Injury Reserve Exempt List: currently vacant; Transfer List: currently vacant; rookies in italics Roster updated June 5, 2013; 14 Active, 0 Inactive ] |
