= Vince Hill (American football) =

American football player (born 1985)

No. 3, 6, 23
- Position: Defensive back

Personal information
- Born: November 22, 1985 (age 40)
- Listed height: 6 ft 0 in (1.83 m)
- Listed weight: 185 lb (84 kg)

Career information
- College: Miles College (AL)
- NFL draft: 2009: undrafted

Career history
- Tennessee Valley/Alabama Vipers (2009–2010); Arizona Rattlers (2010–2011); San Jose SaberCats (2011–2012); Alabama Hammers (2013–2014); Alabama Outlawz (2015); Florida Tarpons (2016)

Awards and highlights
- Second-team All-Arena (2010); PIFL champion (2013)

Career AFL statistics
- Tackles: 268.5
- Interceptions: 19
- Pass breakups: 53
- Forced fumbles: 4
- Total TDs: 2
- Stats at ArenaFan.com

Vince Hill (born November 22, 1985) is an American former professional football defensive back. He played college football at Miles College. He was a member of the Alabama Vipers, Arizona Rattlers, San Jose SaberCats, Alabama Hammers, Alabama Outlawz, and Florida Tarpons.

== College career ==
Hill played college football for the Miles Golden Bears, playing wide receiver his first two seasons before switching to defensive back for his final two seasons. He earned All-Southern Intercollegiate Athletic Conference honors in 2008.

== Professional career ==
Hill joined the Tennessee Valley Vipers of the af2 in 2009, posting 34 tackles that year. On March 19, 2010, he signed with the Alabama Vipers of the Arena Football League (AFL). He earned second-team All-Arena honors and led the AFL in pass breakups with 30 in 2010.

Hill was signed by the Arizona Rattlers on October 6, 2010.

Hill signed with the San Jose SaberCats on September 28, 2011.

Hill played for the Alabama Hammers of the Professional Indoor Football League from 2013 to 2014, winning the PIFL championship in 2013.

Hill was signed by the Alabama Outlawz in December 2014.

On May 8, 2016, Hill signed with the Florida Tarpons.

=== AFL statistics ===
Year	Team										
Year	Team	Tkl	Ast	Sck	PB	FF	FR	Blk	Int	Yds	TD
2010	Alabama	71	34	0.0	30	1	1	0	6	129	2
2011	Arizona	86	32	0.0	15	2	1	0	9	97	0
2012	San Jose	67	23	0.0	8	1	1	0	4	12	0
Career		224	89	0.0	53	4	3	0	19	238	2
