= Randall Burden =

American football player (born 1989)

No. 24, 26
- Position: Cornerback/Safety

Personal information
- Born: February 6, 1989 (age 37); Huntsville, Alabama, U.S.
- Listed height: 6 ft 2 in (1.88 m)
- Listed weight: 200 lb (91 kg)

Career information
- High school: LaGrange (GA)
- College: Kentucky
- NFL draft: 2012: undrafted

Career history
- Missouri Monsters (2013); Tampa Bay Storm (2014–2015); Spokane Empire (2016); Florida Tarpons (2016)

Career AFL statistics
- Tackles: 34.5
- Sacks: 0
- Interceptions: 1
- Pass breakups: 5
- Stats at ArenaFan.com

Randall E. Burden Jr. (born February 6, 1989) is an American former professional football cornerback.

== College career ==
He played college football at the University of Kentucky.

== Professional career ==
=== Missouri Monsters ===
On March 11, 2013, Burden signed with the Missouri Monsters of the Ultimate Indoor Football League (UIFL).

=== Tampa Bay Storm ===
Burden was assigned to the Tampa Bay Storm.

=== Spokane Empire ===
On September 10, 2015, Burden was signed by the Spokane Empire of the Indoor Football League. he was released on April 12, 2016.

=== Florida Tarpons ===
Following his release from Spokane, Burden signed with the Florida Tarpons of American Indoor Football.
