= 2013 Lakeland Raiders season =

- Owner: Michael Mink; Robert Tannenbaum
- General manager: Michael Mink
- Head coach: Michael Mink
- Home stadium: Lakeland Center

Results
- Record: 6–3
- League place: 3rd
- Playoffs: Lost Semifinals 58–68 (Fury)

The 2013 Lakeland Raiders season was the second season for the United Indoor Football League (UIFL) franchise.

== Schedule ==
Key: Win Tie Loss Bye

=== Regular season ===
All start times are local to home team

| Week | Day | Date | Opponent | Results | | Location |
| Week | Day | Date | Opponent | Score | Record | Location |
|---|---|---|---|---|---|---|
| 1 | Saturday | March 4 | at Georgia Rampage | W 74–25 | 1–0 | Northwest Georgia Trade and Convention Center |
| 2 | Saturday | March 9 | Sarasota Thunder | W 78–0 | 2–0 | Lakeland Center |
| 3 | BYE | | | | | |
| 4 | Sunday | March 24 | at Florida Tarpons | L 36–41 | 2–1 | Germain Arena |
| 5 | Saturday | March 30 | Florida Tarpons | W 52–40 | 3–1 | Lakeland Center |
| 6 | BYE | | | | | |
| 7 | Saturday | April 12 | at Corpus Christi Fury | L 58–64 (OT) | 3–2 | American Bank Center |
| 8 | Saturday | April 20 | Sarasota Thunder | W 90–0 | 4–2 | Lakeland Center |
| 9 | Sunday | April 28 | Chattahoochee Valley Vipers | W 90–6 | 5–2 | Lakeland Center |
| 10 | Saturday | May 4 | Corpus Christi Fury | L 36–50 | 5–3 | Lakeland Center |
| 11 | BYE | | | | | |
| 12 | Sunday | May 19 | Missouri Monsters | W 59–6 | 6–3 | Lakeland Center |
| 13 | BYE | | | | | |

=== Postseason ===
| Round | Day | Date | Opponent | Results | | Location |
| Round | Day | Date | Opponent | Score | Record | Location |
|---|---|---|---|---|---|---|
| Semifinals | Sunday | June 2 | at Corpus Christi Fury | L 58–68 | 0–1 | American Bank Center |

== Standings ==
2013 UIFL standings (Note: http://www.theuifl.com/01/UIFLStats/confsked.htm)
| Team | W | L | PCT | PF | PA | STK |
|---|---|---|---|---|---|---|
| y-Florida Tarpons | 5 | 1 | .833 | 304 | 187 | W4 |
| x-Corpus Christi Fury | 6 | 1 | .857 | 431 | 345 | L1 |
| x-Lakeland Raiders | 6 | 3 | .667 | 573 | 232 | W1 |
| Missouri Monsters | 5 | 5 | .500 | 459 | 424 | W1 |
| Georgia Rampage | 3 | 5 | .375 | 318 | 343 | W1 |
| Sarasota Thunder | 0 | 3 | .000 | 0 | 230 | L3 |

y - clinched conference title x - clinched playoff spot

== Roster ==
2013 Lakeland Raiders roster
| Quarterbacks: -- Chris Walley; Running backs: -- K. C. Tolson; Wide receivers: -- Tyler Batts; 11 Jason Harmon; -- Roderick Jefferson; -- Josh Smith | Offensive linemen: Currently vacant; Defensive linemen: Currently vacant; Linebackers: -- Sam Smith; -- Drametrice Smith | Defensive backs: -- Rashad Ethridge; -- DeAngelo Woodie; Kickers: -- Jesse Cortez | Injured reserve: Currently vacant; Exempt list: -- Collin Drafts QB; -- B. J. Hall QB; Practice squad: Currently vacant; Rookies in italics Roster updated October 29, 2012; 3 Active, 0 Inactive, 0 PS |
