= 2013 Sarasota Thunder season =

- Owner: Dale Taylor; Jeff Eberly
- Head coach: Greg Walls
- Home stadium: Travel team

Results
- Record: 0–3
- League place: 6th
- Playoffs: did not qualify

The 2013 Sarasota Thunder season was the first and only season for the professional indoor football franchise and first in the Ultimate Indoor Football League (UIFL). The Thunder were one of six teams that competed in the UIFL for the 2013 season.

Led by head coach Greg Walls, the Thunder played their entire season as a travel team, based out of Sarasota, Florida.

== Schedule ==
Key: Win Tie Loss Bye

=== Regular season ===
All start times are local to home team

Week	Day	Date	Opponent	Results		Location
Week	Day	Date	Opponent	Score	Record	Location
1	BYE					
2	Saturday	March 9	at Lakeland Raiders	L 0-78	0-1	Lakeland Center
3	Sunday	March 18	at Florida Tarpons	Cancelled	0-1	Germain Arena
4	Monday	March 27	at Corpus Christi Fury	Cancelled	0-1	American Bank Center
5	Monday	April 1	at Georgia Rampage	Cancelled	0-1	Northwest Georgia Trade and Convention Center
6	BYE					
7	BYE					
8	Sunday	April 20	at Lakeland Raiders	L 0-90	0-2	Lakeland Center
9	Saturday	April 28	at Florida Tarpons	L 0–62	0-3	Germain Arena
10	BYE					
11	Friday	May 17	at Florida Tarpons	Cancelled	0-3	Germain Arena
12	BYE					
13	BYE					

== Standings ==
2013 UIFL standings (Note: http://www.theuifl.com/01/UIFLStats/confsked.htm)
Team	W	L	PCT	PF	PA	STK
y-Florida Tarpons	5	1	.833	304	187	W4
x-Corpus Christi Fury	6	1	.857	431	345	L1
x-Lakeland Raiders	6	3	.667	573	232	W1
Missouri Monsters	5	5	.500	459	424	W1
Georgia Rampage	3	5	.375	318	343	W1
Sarasota Thunder	0	3	.000	0	230	L3

y - clinched conference title x - clinched playoff spot

== Roster ==
2013 Sarasota Thunder roster
Quarterbacks: -- Marquel Neasman; Running backs: currently vacant; Wide receivers: -- Darren Haliburton	Offensive linemen: currently vacant; Defensive linemen: -- Arthur Jeffery; Linebackers: currently vacant	Defensive backs: currently vacant; Kickers: currently vacant	Injured Reserve: currently vacant; Exempt List: currently vacant; Practice squad: currently vacant; rookies in italics Roster updated October 29, 2012; 3 Active, 0 Inactive, 0 PS
