= Columbus Beast =

Columbus, Ohio, US indoor football team

- Founded: 2013
- Folded: 2014
- League: Xtreme Indoor Football League
- Team history: Columbus Beast (2014)
- Based in: Columbus, Ohio
- Arena: Stars Indoor Sports
- Colors: Black, Green, Gray, White
- Owner: LaMonte Coleman
- President: LaMonte Coleman
- Head coach: Chris Wallace
- General manager: LaMonte Coleman
- Championships: 0
- Conference titles: 0
- Website: ColumbusBeast.com

The Columbus Beast was a professional indoor football team set to begin play as a charter member of the Xtreme Indoor Football League for its inaugural 2014 season. Based in Columbus, Ohio, the Beast were to play their home games at Stars Indoor Sports.

== History ==
The Beast was set to be the third indoor/arena football team to call Ohio's capital city home. Both of Columbus' previous two teams played in the Arena Football League; the Columbus Thunderbolts only played the 1991 season at the Ohio Expo Center Coliseum before moving to Cleveland the following year, whereas the Columbus Destroyers (which had moved from Buffalo, New York) played at Nationwide Arena from 2004 until the league went on hiatus following the 2008 season (most notably appearing in ArenaBowl XXI). A Continental Indoor Football League team called the Columbus Aces was set to begin play in 2010, but the ownership group instead decided to keep their Marion Mayhem franchise going for one more season.

The Beast were planned to play the inaugural XLIF season, but were left out and didn't participate in the second season as well, and are currently considered folded.

== Staff ==
The Beast's ownership group is led by XIFL president LaMonte Coleman; Coleman also is head of the Marion Blue Racers' ownership group. In addition, former Toledo Rockets quarterback and indoor football veteran Chris Wallace will serve as the Beast's inaugural head coach.
