= Mike McMullen =

American football player (born 1973)

No. 13
- Position: Quarterback

Personal information
- Born: October 13, 1973 (age 53); Portsmouth, Virginia
- Listed height: 6 ft 6 in (1.98 m)
- Listed weight: 290 lb (132 kg)

Career information
- High school: Granada Hills (CA) John F. Kennedy
- College: Glendale CC

Career history
- St. Louis Attack (2014–2015)

Awards and highlights
- X-League Offensive Player of the Year (2014); X-League MVP (2015)

Mike McMullen (born October 13, 1973) is a former indoor American football quarterback for the St. Louis Attack (since renamed the River City Raiders), who played in 2014 and 2015. McMullen was the X-League Indoor Football MVP in 2014, 2014 X-League Offensive Player of the Year, and All X-League Quarterback, posting 20 touchdowns with only 2 interceptions and leading the Attack to an undefeated regular season and the X league Championship games. In 2015, McMullen once again led the Attack to a 5–3 regular season record, completing 54% of his passes for 1,086 yards and 18 touchdowns.

Before joining the Attack, McMullen was a minor league baseball pitcher He began his career in 1993 in the Arizona Rookie league in 1993 as a starting pitcher. In the spring of 1996 he was converted to a sidearm relief pitcher and his career took off. McMullen was named Texas league pitcher of the year by Baseball America in 1998 as well as AA Texas League All Star. He was assigned as a top prospect to the Arizona Fall League Scottsdale scorpions in 1998. He was a non roster invitee to big league camp with the Giants in 2000. In 2001, he signed a minor league free agent deal with the Minnesota Twins and was assigned to AAA Edmonton. He was drafted in the 14th round out of Glendale Community College in 1993. He made it as high a AAA.

McMullen is now a financial representative for Country Financial in Saint Charles, Missouri.
