= Sarasota Thunder =

Logo

General information
- Founded: 2013
- Folded: 2013
- Headquartered: Sarasota, Florida at the Robarts Arena
- Colors: Red, Orange, and White

Personnel
- Owners: Dale Taylor; Jeff Eberly
- Head coach: Greg Walls

Team history
- Huntington Hammer (2011-2012) Sarasota Thunder (2013)

Home fields
- Robarts Arena (2013)

League / conference affiliations
- Ultimate Indoor Football League (2013)

Playoff appearances (0)
- 0

The Sarasota Thunder were a professional indoor football team based in Sarasota, Florida. They played in the Ultimate Indoor Football League (UIFL) for part of the 2013 season before folding. The Thunder initially announced Robarts Arena as their home venue, though they played all their games on the road.

== Franchise history ==
In August 2012, the Sarasota Thunder was announced as the third 2013 expansion team of the Ultimate Indoor Football League. This was the second attempt to bring an indoor football team to Sarasota, the first being the Florida Scorpions of the National Indoor Football League. The team announced they would play their home games at Robarts Arena. In September 2012, the Thunder named Greg Walls the franchise's first head coach.

Before the season, however, the league took over control of the Thunder and shifted them to an all-travel schedule, with no home games in Sarasota. The team played very poorly, generally losing in blowouts. Their performance caused disruption through the league, as their host teams had difficulty drawing fans to such lopsided games. On May 9, the Florida Tarpons – whose owners also owned the UIFL – announced the Thunder had forfeited a scheduled game against them; the league subsequently folded the team.

== Head coaches ==
Name	Term	Regular season				Playoffs		Awards
Name	Term	W	L	T	Win%	W	L	Awards
Greg Walls	2013	0	3	0	.000	0	0	

== Season-by-season results ==
League champions	Conference champions	Division champions	Wild card berth	League leader

Season	Team	League	Conference	Division	Regular season				Postseason results
Season	Team	League	Conference	Division	Finish	Wins	Losses	Ties	Postseason results
2013	2013	UIFL			6th	0	3	0	
Totals						0	3	0	All-time regular season record (2013)
Totals						0	0	-	All-time postseason record (2013)
Totals						0	3	0	All-time regular season and postseason record (2013)
