= 2015 X-League Indoor Football season =

- League: X-League Indoor Football
- Sport: Indoor football
- Season champions: Florida Tarpons

X-Bowl II
- Champions: Florida Tarpons
- Runners-up: Florida Marine Raiders
- Finals MVP: Javious Faulk

XLIF seasons
- ← 2014 none →

The 2015 X-League Indoor Football season was the second season for the X-League. The biggest change in the off-season is the addition of the Cape Fear Heroes, Corpus Christi Fury, Florida Tarpons, Rio Grande Valley Sol, Marion Blue Racers, and Bloomington Edge.

== Standings ==
Team	Wins	Losses	Percentage
z-Florida Tarpons	6	2	.750
Rio Grande Valley Sol	5	2	.714
St. Louis Attack	5	3	.625
Bloomington Edge	5	3	.625
x-Florida Marine Raiders	5	3	.625
Marion Blue Racers	5	3	.625
Cape Fear Heroes	4	4	.500
Georgia Rampage	2	6	.250
Alabama Outlawz	2	6	.250
Corpus Christi Fury	0	7	.000

- z-Indicates best regular season record
- x-Indicates clinched playoff berth

== Playoffs ==
Originally planned as a three-team playoff, the X-Bowl was moved up to June 6, 2015, and the post-season shortened after the Cape Fear Heroes were suspended by the league and the St. Louis Attack agreed to forgo their third-place playoff berth.

X-Bowl II
2	Florida Marine	23
1	Florida	65
