= 2013 UIFL season =

- League: Ultimate Indoor Football League
- Sport: Indoor Football
- Duration: March 4, 2013 – June 8, 2013

Regular season
- #1 Seed champions: Florida Tarpons
- #1 Seed runners-up: bye
- #2 vs. #3 champions: Corpus Christi Fury
- #2 vs. #3 runners-up: Lakeland Raiders

Ultimate Bowl III
- Champions: Florida Tarpons
- Runners-up: Corpus Christi Fury
- Finals MVP: Chris Wallace

UIFL seasons
- ← 2012 2014 →

The 2013 Ultimate Indoor Football League season was the third season of the league. The league contracted down to just 6 teams.

== Team movement ==
=== Expansion ===
On May 29, 2013, the Missouri Monsters were announced as the first expansion team for the 2013 season. On July 23, 2012, the league announced that the Indianapolis Panthers would be joining the UIFL, however they would later be removed from the league prior to the beginning of the season. On August 12, 2012, it was announced that the Sarasota, Florida (Sarasota Thunder) marked would be joining the UIFL. On September 27, 2012, the fourth and final expansion team was accepted into the UIFL, the Corpus Christi Fury.

=== Retraction ===
The Cincinnati Commandos, Eastern Kentucky Drillers, Erie Explosion and Marion Blue Racers all left the UIFL to join the Continental Indoor Football League (CIFL). The league also announced that the Western Pennsylvania Sting would relocate to Coral Gables, Florida as the Miami Sting, however the Sting never played a game, folding before the season began.

== Standings ==
2013 UIFL standings (Note: http://www.theuifl.com/01/UIFLStats/confsked.htm)
Team	W	L	PCT	PF	PA	STK
y-Florida Tarpons	5	1	.833	304	187	W4
x-Corpus Christi Fury	6	1	.857	431	345	L1
x-Lakeland Raiders	6	3	.667	573	232	W1
Missouri Monsters	5	5	.500	459	424	W1
Georgia Rampage	3	5	.375	318	343	W1
Sarasota Thunder	0	3	.000	0	230	L3

y - clinched conference title x - clinched playoff spot

== 2013 Playoffs ==
Semifinal			Ultimate Bowl III
			2	Corpus Christi	32
3	Lakeland	58	1	Florida	40
2	Corpus Christi	68

2013 Ultimate Indoor Football League seasons
Corpus Christi	Florida	Georgia	Lakeland	Missouri	Sarasota
