= Rio Grande Valley Dorados (2019) =

Indoor football team in Hidalgo, Texas, US

General information
- Founded: 2019
- Folded: 2022
- Headquartered: Hidalgo, Texas
- Colors: Navy blue, red, gold, white
- RGV-Dorados.com

Personnel
- Owners: Juan and Erika Arevalo (early 2019); International Arena Football League (mid-2019); Mario Rey (2021–2022)
- Head coach: Bennie King

Team history
- Rio Grande Valley Dorados (2019–2022)

Home fields
- State Farm Hidalgo Arena (2019, 2021); Traveling team (2022)

League / conference affiliations
- International Arena Football League (2019); Arena Football Association (2022)

Playoff appearances (1)
- 2019

The Rio Grande Valley Dorados were a professional indoor football team based in Hidalgo, Texas. The team originally began play in 2019 as an inaugural member of the International Arena Football League with their home games at State Farm Hidalgo Arena. The league and team folded after the 2019 season. In 2021, the team was reactivated as a member of the Arena Football Association for the 2022 season as a traveling team.

== History ==
They began play in 2019 as an expansion member of the International Arena Football League with their home games at Payne Arena in Hidalgo, Texas. The new team, owned by Juan and Erika Arevalo, marketed itself as a continuation of the defunct af2 team of the same name.

Part-way into their inaugural season, the Dorados announced they would no longer have games at State Farm Hidalgo Arena. The team stated they terminated the lease while arena operators stated the team had broken their lease. They reportedly owed the arena $31,000 in expenses, but came to an agreement to cover their debt with the arena taking ownership of all team's property left at the arena. The team continued the season, operated by the league, as a travel-only team and qualified for the championship game against the Mexico City Mexicah with the second place 4–3 record. The game was played in Mexico and the Dorados lost 58–20.

The league and league-owned team appeared to have become defunct before the end of 2019 with all websites dead and no active social media efforts.

In November 2021, the team was announced as an inaugural member of the Arena Football Association (AFA) that had been formed from the Amarillo Venom and West Texas Warbirds' 2021 Lone Star Series, along with the Texas Jets, former American Arena League champions North Texas Bulls, and the Texas Crude. The team website was reactivated and was now owned by Mario Rey. The team was scheduled to have no home games in 2022 and will play as a traveling team. As of 2022, the team folded for good.
