= Southern Steam =

Indoor American football team

Logo

General information
- Founded: 2013
- Headquartered: Jacksonville, Florida
- Colors: Red, white, black, grey
- steamindoorfootball.com

Personnel
- Owner: Bobby Dammarell
- General manager: Jenny Dammarell
- Head coach: Bobby Dammarell

Team history
- Pennsylvania Steam (2014); Savannah Steam (2014–2016); Southern Steam (2017–2024)

Home fields
- DeVaul Henderson Park (2015); Savannah Civic Center (2016); Statesboro Indoor Sports (2017–2018); Jacksonville Ice & Sportsplex (2019–2024)

League / conference affiliations
- X-League Indoor Football (2014); American Indoor Football (2015–2016); Southern Division (2016); Elite Indoor Football (2017–2024)

Championships
- League championships: 2: EIF: 2017, 2019

Playoff appearances (2)
- AIF: 2016; EIF: 2017, 2018

The Southern Steam are a professional indoor football team. The Steam joined X-League Indoor Football in 2013, as the Pennsylvania Steam based in Reading, Pennsylvania. Midway through the 2014 season, the Steam were sold to a Georgia ownership group, who moved the franchise to Savannah, Georgia, during the regular season. Following the 2014 season, the Steam joined American Indoor Football (AIF) for the 2015 season. After the 2016 season, the AIF folded leaving the Steam to search for a new league.

The Steam played their home games at the Martin Luther King Jr. Arena at the Savannah Civic Center. However, the City of Savannah stated in 2016 that the Steam could not return unless they pay all money owed to the city prior to returning. They began playing in nearby Statesboro instead, first outdoors and then in a converted warehouse for 2017 as the Southern Steam. In 2019, the Steam announced via Facebook they were relocating to Jacksonville, Florida, for the 2019 season citing lack of ticket sales.

== Franchise history ==
It was announced in October 2013, that the Pennsylvania Steam would be joining X-League Indoor Football for its inaugural 2014 season, playing their home games at Santander Arena in Reading, Pennsylvania under head coach Shane Houser.

=== 2014 season ===
After playing one road game as the Pennsylvania Steam, the franchise was sold by Missouri Sports Holdings to an ownership group led by Bobby Dammarell in Savannah, Georgia. The team played their remaining three road games as the Savannah Steam, while the four home games that were scheduled to take place in Reading, Pennsylvania were cancelled and counted as wins for the opposing teams.

=== 2015 season ===
It was announced in December 2014, that the Savannah Steam were joining American Indoor Football for the 2015 season, playing their home games at Tiger Arena. However, the Steam eventually played their home games at DeVaul Henderson Park, an outdoor park in Richmond Hill, Georgia. They finished the regular season 5-2, failing to qualify for the playoffs.

=== 2016 season ===
For 2016, the Steam announced that they would be playing at the Savannah Civic Center. The team would run into severe financial troubles during this season with over $20,000 owed in rent for the use of the Civic Center and several unpaid sponsors. Eventually, the unpaid sponsors took their claims to the local sheriff's department in order to initiate an investigation and obtain the fees they were owed. In June 2016, general manager Jenny Dammarrel, wife of owner/head coach Bobby Dammarrel, first filed for Chapter 13 bankruptcy and then was later jailed after being charged with deposit account fraud for bad checks issued to players and staff. Despite the 2016 season's financial difficulties, a 3-5 record, and no wins over another AIF team (one forfeit win, one loss reversed based on ineligible players, and one win over a local semi-professional team), the Steam were still invited to the AIF playoffs against the Florida Tarpons. The Steam replaced the Myrtle Beach Freedom when the Freedom were asked to play against the West Michigan Ironmen when they lost their playoff opponent.

=== Elite Indoor Football ===
On July 18, 2016, the AIF announced it had ceased operations. On August 4, the Steam announced they were accepted into the new Elite Indoor Football. In fact, Elite Indoor Football is based at the same office in the Savannah suburb of Ellabell and its president is Robert Dammarell, also owner of the Steam, indicating that (like the Cape Fear Heroes did in creating Supreme Indoor Football) Dammarell and the Steam created their own league.

On August 17, 2016, the City of Savannah made it clear that the Steam could not return to the Civic Center for home games unless the Dammarrels paid all money owed to the city from the previous season; in any event, the Savannah Coastal Outlaws of United States Indoor Football and Arena Pro Football had already secured a lease on the Savannah Civic Center. The Steam had a cross-schedule agreement with Supreme Indoor Football to play games against some of its teams for the 2017 season.

Before starting their season, the Steam appeared to have rebranded to the Southern Steam. Once they starting playing EIF league games, they were listed as playing outdoors in nearby Statesboro. Later in the 2017 season, the team moved home games into a converted warehouse in Statesboro. In 2019 they moved to Jacksonville, Florida, and the Jacksonville Ice & Sportsplex. The Steam concluded their 2019 season in Championship fashion with a 24-14 victory over the Carolina Aviators. Courtney Reese was named the 2019 offensive MVP after accounting for an Elite Indoor Football season record 24 touchdowns.

The most recent reference to the team is from January 2025, when, after changing its name to the Southern Scream and initially agreeing to join the Professional Arena Indoor Association, they withdrew from that league prior to the 2025 season.

== Statistics and records ==
=== Season-by-season results ===
Note: The finish, wins, losses, and ties columns list regular season results and exclude any postseason play.

League champions	Division champions	Playoff berth	League leader

Season	Team	League	Division	Regular season				Postseason results
Season	Team	League	Division	Finish	Wins	Losses	Ties	Postseason results
2014	2014	XLIF		5th	0	8	0	
2015	2015	AIF		5th	6	2	0	
2016	2016	AIF	Southern	4th	3	5	0	Lost Division Semifinals (Tarpons) 20–71
2017	2017	EIF		1st	Note (Note: Record keeping in the 2017 EIF season was inconsistent and ultimately not tracked as most games were not between league members. The Steam did claim first place though as it had defeated all EIF teams it played.)			Won EIF Championship Game (Furious) 58–14
2018	2018	EIF		2nd	8	2	0	Lost EIF Championship Game (Bobcats) 40–44
2019	2019	EIF		1st	Note (Note: Record keeping in the 2019 EIF season was inconsistent and ultimately not tracked as most games were not between league members. The championship game was held in the Steam's home venue in Jacksonville.)			Won EIF Championship Game (Aviators) 24–14

=== Head coaches' records ===
Note: Known statistics are correct through the end of the 2018 Elite Indoor Football season. This does not account for the 2017 or 2019 EIF season due to inadequate record keeping

Name	Term	Regular season				Playoffs		Awards
Name	Term	W	L	T	Win%	W	L	Awards
Shane Houser	2014	0	8	0	.000	0	0	
Bobby Dammarell	2015–present	17	9	0	.654	1	2	
