= Payne Arena =

Multi-purpose arena in Hildago, Texas, US

Coordinates: 26°7′26″N 98°14′48″W

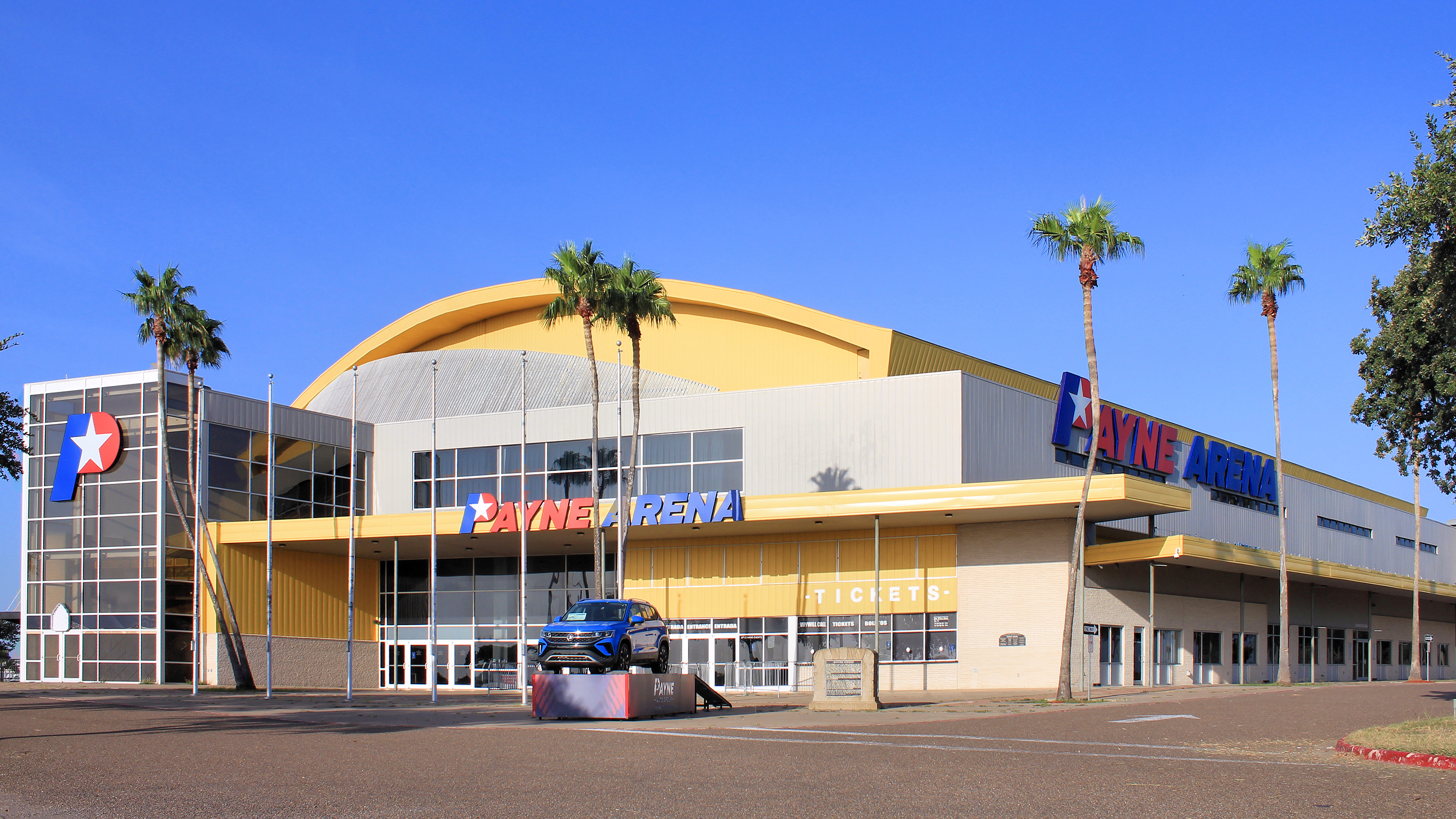
- Interactive map of Payne Arena
- Former names: Dodge Arena (2003–2010); State Farm Arena (2010–2018); State Farm Hidalgo Arena (2018–2019)
- Address: 2600 North SH 336
- Location: Hidalgo, Texas
- Owner: City of Hidalgo-Texas Municipal Facilities Corporation
- Operator: City of Hidalgo-Texas Municipal Facilities Corporation
- Capacity: Hockey: 5,500; Concerts: 6,800 and 7,400 (360°)
- Surface: Multi-surface

Construction
- Groundbreaking: June 2002
- Opened: October 23, 2003
- Cost: $23,000,000 ($40.3 million in 2025 dollars)
- Architects: PBK Architects, Inc. Eduardo Vela Architects
- Project manager: International Coliseums Company
- Services engineers: Murray & Associates, Inc.
- General contractor: Williamson/Pharr

Tenants
- Rio Grande Valley Killer Bees (CHL) (2003–2012); Rio Grande Valley Dorados (AF2) (2004–2009); Rio Grande Valley Vipers (NBA G League) (2007–2018); Rio Grande Valley Magic (SIFL/LSFL) (2011–2012); Rio Grande Valley Killer Bees (NAHL) (2013–2015); Hidalgo La Fiera (PASL/MASL) (2013–2014); Rio Grande Valley Sol (LSFL/X-League) (2014–2015); RGV Barracudas FC (MASL) (2017–2018); Rio Grande Valley Dorados (IAFL) (2019)

The Payne Arena is a multi-purpose complex, in Hidalgo, Texas, United States. It was formerly known as Dodge Arena from 2003 until February 2010, State Farm Arena from 2010 to September 2018, and then State Farm Hidalgo Arena for one year.

== Capacity ==
The arena seats up to 5,500 persons in its configuration for ice hockey, indoor football and indoor soccer, and up to 6,800 persons in its center stage concert configuration, which has also been used for boxing events. The arena also features 25 suites, 500 club seats, 2,200 on-site surface parking spaces, an adjacent 2,000-square-foot (190 m^{2}) lounge with access from outside the arena, as well as a 1,000-square-foot (93 m^{2}) bar and a 300-square-foot (28 m^{2}) pro shop.ory

== History ==
The arena was built in 2003, at a cost of $23 million, and is owned by the City of Hidalgo Municipal Facilities Corporation. The former DaimlerChrysler Corporation, at that time the owner of the Dodge brand, purchased the naming rights to the arena. Country music star Alan Jackson gave the first concert at the arena.

On February 4, 2010, State Farm Insurance bought the naming rights for the arena. In June 2014, State Farm extended their naming rights deal for another five years. State Farm did not plan on renewing the naming rights deal before it expired, but in 2018, the arena was briefly renamed to State Farm Hidalgo Arena to avoid confusion with the then-recently renamed State Farm Arena in Atlanta, Georgia.

In September 2019, local car dealership Payne Auto Group assumed the arena's naming rights.

== Events ==
Payne Arena was the home to the Rio Grande Valley Vipers of the NBA G League. The team was based at the arena from 2007 until 2018 when their new home, Bert Ogden Arena in Edinburg, was completed.

The professional minor league Rio Grande Valley Killer Bees ice hockey team of the Central Hockey League called the arena home from 2003 to 2012. In 2013 a junior ice hockey team of the same name began play as a member of the North American Hockey League and played there until the team relocated to Aston, Pennsylvania, for the 2015–16 season. In 2018, another junior level Killer Bees returned to the Rio Grande Valley in the USA Central Hockey League, but the league folded after six weeks of operation. The Rio Grande Valley Dorados of arena football's AF2 league were tenants from 2004 until 2009, when the team folded along with the league. The Rio Grande Valley Magic of the Lone Star Football League played in the arena from 2011 through 2012. The Rio Grande Valley Flash of the Major Arena Soccer League were founded in 2012, renamed, as Hidalgo La Fiera in July 2013, and then ceased operations mid-season in December 2014.

One notable State Farm Arena concert took place in 2009, when Mexican singer Gloria Trevi performed before a soldout crowd. Trevi has been a resident of the Rio Grande Valley in recent years and presently resides in nearby McAllen. Another notable concert featured country music star George Strait in 2014 as the second-to-last show of his farewell "The Cowboy Rides Away Tour". On October 19, 2014, the arena hosted an NBA pre-season game between the Houston Rockets and Golden State Warriors. In 2016, UFC Fight Night: Poirier vs. Johnson was held at the arena.
