= Chris Wallace (American football) =

American football player (born 1975)

No. 7
- Position: Quarterback

Personal information
- Born: November 4, 1975 (age 51); Springfield, Ohio, U.S.
- Listed height: 6 ft 0 in (1.83 m)
- Listed weight: 240 lb (109 kg)

Career information
- High school: South (Springfield)
- College: Toledo
- NFL draft: 1999: undrafted

Career history
- Carolina Rhinos (2000); Orlando Predators (2001); Tennessee Valley Vipers (2002); Orlando Predators (2002–2003); Florida Firecats (2004–2009); New Orleans VooDoo (2011); Pittsburgh Power (2011); Florida Tarpons (2012–2013); Marion Blue Racers (2014); Florida Tarpons (2015–2018); Atlanta Havoc (2018–2019)

Awards and highlights
- Second-team All-MAC (1997); Jim Nicholson Award (1997); First-team All-UIFL South (2012); UIFL champion (2013); X-League champion (2015)

Career AFL statistics
- Completions: 103
- Attempts: 198
- Yards: 1,283
- Touchdowns: 19
- Interceptions: 6
- Stats at ArenaFan.com

Christopher Wallace (born November 4, 1975) is an American former football quarterback. He played college football for the University of Toledo. He was signed as an undrafted free agent by the Orlando Predators in 2001.

== Early life ==
Wallace attended South High School in Springfield, Ohio.

== College career ==
Wallace attended the University of Toledo after his graduation from high school. At the time of his graduation, Wallace was the only Rocket to have thrown five touchdowns in a game, achieving the feat twice. His 27 touchdowns in 1997 were a school record for a single season until they were broken by Bruce Gradkowski in 2003. He currently sits at sixth all time in Toledo history for passing yards in a career.

=== Statistics ===
Through end of the 1998 season, Wallace' college statistics were as follows:

		Passing							Rushing		
Season	Team	Rating	Att	Comp	Pct	Yds	TD	INT	Att	Yds	TD
1995	Toledo	-66.7	3	0	0.0	0	0	1	3	3	0
1996	Toledo	24.4	12	3	25.0	23	0	1	4	40	0
1997	Toledo	127.3	433	232	53.6	2,955	27	9	98	232	2
1998	Toledo	116.8	400	219	54.8	2,476	17	8	93	-53	4
	Totals	120.2	848	454	53.5	5,454	44	19	198	222	6

== Professional career ==
Since commencing his professional career, Wallace has played for a number of indoor football teams. On March 24, 2002, Wallace was placed on injured reserve by the Orlando Predators. He spent eight seasons with the Florida Firecats of the af2 and was that league's all-time leader in passing yardage. In 2011, he was briefly the starting quarterback of the Arena Football League's New Orleans Voodoo, starting two games and winning one; later in the same season he started for the Pittsburgh Power. He joined the Tarpons in 2012 and completed 157 passes on 272 attempts for 2,091 yards and 63 touchdowns, leading the team to a conference title and Ultimate Bowl II. In 2013, Wallace lead the Tarpons to an Ultimate Bowl III victory over the Corpus Christi Fury. In March, 2014, Wallace came back to playing football when he signed with the Marion Blue Racers. Wallace returned to the Tarpons in 2015. He finished off his playing career with the Atlanta Havoc of the American arena league.

== Coaching career ==
In June, 2013, Wallace was named the first head coach of the expansion Columbus Beast of the Xtreme Indoor Football League, but when the Beast owner moved his other franchise (the Marion Blue Racers) to the Continental Indoor Football League, it was announced that Wallace was to be the Head Coach for the Blue Racers. However, Wallace left the Blue Racers to pursue his teaching career.
