= Alabama Outlawz =

Former indoor American football team

Logo

General information
- Founded: 2013
- Folded: 2017
- Headquartered: Birmingham, Alabama
- Colors: Lime, black, silver

Personnel
- Owner: David Warren
- Head coach: Donnell Robinson

Team history
- Alabama Outlawz (2014–2015, 2017)

Home fields
- Bill Harris Arena (2014–2015); Shelby County Exhibition Center (2017) – never played

League / conference affiliations
- X-League Indoor Football (2014–2015); Arena Pro Football (2017)

The Alabama Outlawz were a professional indoor football team that resumed play in Arena Pro Football. They last played in the 2017 season at the Shelby County Exhibition Center in Columbiana, Alabama. They previously played in X-League Indoor Football while based in Birmingham, Alabama, with home games at Bill Harris Arena.

== Franchise history ==
It was announced in November 2013 that the Alabama Outlawz would be joining X-League Indoor Football for its inaugural 2014 season, playing their home games in Bill Harris Arena at the Birmingham CrossPlex. Lee Ellison, who was 37 years old when the Outlawz were founded in 2013, remained the owner of the franchise.

The Outlawz finished the 2014 season with a record of 5–3–1. The Outlawz had the number one offense under offensive coordinator Mike Bonner. They won the first game ever played in the X-League. The one tie was a result of the final game being canceled and declared a 7–7 tie as the Outlawz and their opponents, the Georgia Rampage, were both out of X-Bowl contention. The league deemed it financially responsible to consider the game a tie and use the operation cost to prepare for the 2015 season.

In 2015, the Outlawz finished with a 2–6 record and ninth out of ten teams in the X-League. Several teams folded or left the league towards the end of the season. The X-League planned a merger with another league but the plans fell through in late 2015 and the X-League folded. The Outlawz were unable to find suitable league to join in time for the 2016 season and announced they would take the season off.

In late 2016, the Outlawz (now calling itself the Birmingham Outlawz) announced it was one of the three inaugural members of a new National Arena Football League to begin play in spring 2017. Around the time of the new league's announcement, the Outlawz ownership posted its announcement on social media but accidentally used the logo of the North American Football League. The National Arena Football League quickly rebranded in October 2016 as Arena Pro Football. The Outlawz failed to secure a lease for the 2017 season in Birmingham causing the team to play out of the Shelby County Exhibition Center in nearby Columbiana. The team then reverted to its Alabama Outlawz moniker. The new owner of the team was announced as David Warren and the head coach would be Darnell Robinson. After three away games, all losses, the Outlawz canceled their first home game scheduled for April 15 due to the lack of dashers on the sidelines which are needed for safety. By April 26, the Outlawz canceled all remaining games for the season, which were all scheduled home games.

== Statistics and records ==
=== Season-by-season results ===
| League champions | Conference champions | Division champions | Playoff berth | League leader |

| Season | League | Regular season | | | | Postseason results |
| Season | League | Finish | Wins | Losses | Ties | Postseason results |
|---|---|---|---|---|---|---|
| 2014 | X-League | | 4 | 3 | 1 | |
| 2015 | X-League | 9th | 2 | 6 | 0 | |
| 2017 | APF | 5th | 0 | 5 | 0 | |
| Totals | | | 6 | 14 | 1 | All-time record (2014–2017) |

=== Head coaches' records ===
| Name | Term | Regular season | | | | Playoffs | | Awards |
| Name | Term | W | L | T | Win% | W | L | Awards |
|---|---|---|---|---|---|---|---|---|
| Lee Ellison | 2014–2015 | 6 | 9 | 1 | .406 | 0 | 0 | |
| Donell Robinson | 2017 | 0 | 5 | 0 | .000 | 0 | 0 | |

=== 2014 season results ===
| Date | Kickoff | Opponent | Results | | Game site |
| Date | Kickoff | Opponent | Final score | Team record | Game site |
|---|---|---|---|---|---|
| March 3 | 7:00 p.m. | at Georgia Rampage | W 44–43 | 1–0 | Northwest Georgia Trade and Convention Center |
| April 4 | 8:00 p.m. | St. Louis Attack | L 39–58 | 1–1 | Bill Harris Arena |
| April 11 | 8:00 p.m. | Savannah Steam | W 82–8 | 2–1 | Bill Harris Arena |
| April 19 | 7:00 p.m. | at Florida Marine Raiders | W 44–38 | 3–1 | Lakeland Center |
| April 25 | 8:00 p.m. | Chattahoochee Vipers (NL) | W 65–35 | 4–1 | Bill Harris Arena |
| May 2 | 8:35 p.m. | at St. Louis Attack | L 65–76 | 4–2 | Family Arena |
| May 9 | 8:00 p.m. | Florida Marine Raiders | L 38–44 | 4–3 | Bill Harris Arena |
| May 17 | 7:35 p.m. | at Savannah Steam | W 55-25 | 5–3 | Santander Arena |
| May 23 | 8:00 p.m. | Georgia Rampage | T 7–7 | 5–3–1 | Bill Harris Arena |

- NL-Indicates Non-League game
