= River City Raiders =

Indoor football team

Logo

General information
- Founded: 2012
- Folded: 2017
- Headquartered: St. Charles, Missouri
- Colors: Purple, black, white
- Mascot: Mak

Personnel
- Owners: Free Tickets Entertainment, LLC
- Head coach: John Parker (2013); Martino Theus (2013); Chris McKinney (2014–2015); Pat Pimmel (2015); Corey Bethany (2016); Greg Moore (2017)
- President: Kenny Nowling

Team history
- Kentucky Monsters (2012); Missouri Monsters (2013); St. Louis Attack (2014-2015); River City Raiders (2016-2017)

Home fields
- Family Arena (2013–2017)

League / conference affiliations
- Ultimate Indoor Football League (2013) X-League Indoor Football (2014–2015) American Indoor Football (2016) Arena Pro Football (2017)

Playoff appearances (2)
- 2014, 2016

The River City Raiders (formerly known as the Missouri Monsters and the St. Louis Attack) were a professional indoor football team based in St. Charles, Missouri. They played their home games at Family Arena.

The Raiders were the second indoor football team to be based in St. Charles, the other being the RiverCity Rage who last played in 2009.

== Franchise history ==
=== 2012 ===
The Monsters, originally known as the Kentucky Monsters, were created due to a dispute with the Northern Kentucky River Monsters, who played the Ultimate Indoor Football League's (UIFL) inaugural season in Highland Heights until the team and the UIFL agreed to part ways. The latter Monsters were created in an attempt to retain the UIFL's rights on the Bank of Kentucky Center and to prevent the original tenants from using the arena. The objective of forcing the River Monsters out of the Northern Kentucky market succeeded and the team went dormant. However, once the River Monsters went dormant, the Kentucky Monsters also quietly folded prior to the 2012 season without playing any games in the UIFL and never getting further than naming a head coach.

=== 2013 ===
The intellectual property rights were transferred to a proposed 2013 expansion team set to play in St. Charles, Missouri, a suburb of St. Louis. John Parker, was named head coach. On March 8, 2013, the Missouri Monsters opened their season with a game against the Corpus Christi Fury, losing 74–37 in front of a crowd of 4,092

On March 26, 2013, head coach John Parker was fired, and Martino Theus was named head coach effective immediately. The Missouri Monsters completed the 2013 season with a 5–5 record.

=== 2014 ===
For the 2014 season, the Monsters changed their name to the St. Louis Attack and played in the X-League Indoor Football. Chris McKinney was named head coach.

After an undefeated regular season, Attack head coach Chris McKinney was named X-League Coach of the Year, and owner Andrew Haines was named Team Owner of the Year. Despite their regular season success, the Attack was defeated in the inaugural championship game 60–48 to the Marine Raiders.

=== 2015 ===
Despite finishing with a 5–3 regular season record and in third place in the X-League, the Attack decided to forgo their X-League playoff berth for the X-Bowl to be played between the Florida Tarpons and the Florida Marine Raiders.

=== 2016 ===
On October 14, it was announced that the Attack had been purchased by Free Tickets Entertainment, LLC, and would play the 2016 season as a member of American Indoor Football. The team gave away all tickets for free, earning revenue on parking and concessions based on the lease with the arena. On October 29, 2015, the franchise officially changed their name to the River City Raiders. Following the season, the AIF announced that it was ceasing operations, leaving the Raiders without a league to play in.

=== 2017 ===
On October 11, 2016, the River City Raiders were listed as members of Champions Indoor Football (CIF) on the 2017 league schedule. In late November 2016, the Raiders were removed from the CIF apparently due to non-payment of league fees. However, their regional opponent, the Chicago Eagles, ceased operations in mid-November after the league schedules had already been made, and the Raiders claimed they actually left the league due to the adverse effects on their schedule caused by the Eagles departure. On December 29, they announced they had joined the newly created Arena Pro Football for the 2017 season.

After playing all five home games to open the season, the Raiders declined to travel to play the Richmond Roughriders for their scheduled May 20 game. The only other away games the Raiders had originally been scheduled for was a cancelled Alabama Outlawz home game (a team that cancelled all their home games) and against the Myrtle Beach Sharks (a team that originally left the APF and then rejoined as a travel-only team). The Raiders final home game was delayed almost one hour after halftime due to the Raiders failure to pay the games referees, according to their radio broadcast.

The Raiders were not included when APF merged into the American Arena League. The team made no formal announcements after the final 2017 game about the team's future and in February 2018, their website and social media pages were removed.

== Head coaches ==
Name	Term	Regular season				Playoffs		Awards
Name	Term	W	L	T	Win%	W	L	Awards
John Parker	2013	0	2	0	.000	0	0	
Martino Theus	2013	5	3	0	.625	0	0	
Chris McKinney	2014–2015	10	2	0	.833	0	1	
Pat Pimmel	2015	3	1	0	.750	0	0	
Corey Bethany	2016	6	1	0	.857	0	1	
Greg Moore	2017	3	2	0	.600	0	0	

== Season-by-season results ==
League champions	Conference champions	Division champions	Wild card berth	League leader

Season	Team	League	Conference	Division	Regular season				Postseason results
Season	Team	League	Conference	Division	Finish	Wins	Losses	Ties	Postseason results
2013	2013	UIFL			4th	5	5	0	
2014	2014	X-League			1st	9	0	0	Lost X-Bowl I (Florida) 48–60
2015	2015	X-League			3rd	5	3	0	
2016	2016	AIF		Northern	2nd	6	1	0	Lost Divisional Semifinal (Lehigh Valley) 52–54
2017	2017	APF			3rd	3	2	0	
Totals						28	11	0	All-time regular season record (2013–2017)
Totals						0	2	—	All-time postseason record (2013–2017)
Totals						28	13	0	All-time regular season and postseason record (2013–2017)
