= Florida Tarpons =

2010s indoor American football team

Logo

General information
- Founded: 2011
- Folded: 2019
- Headquartered: RP Funding Center in Lakeland, Florida
- Colors: Royal blue, red, sea blue, grey, orange, white
- Mascot: Timmy the Tarpon
- LakelandTarpons.com

Personnel
- Owner: A-League Sports
- General manager: Michael Taylor
- Head coach: Michael Taylor

Team history
- Florida Tarpons (2012–2018); Lakeland Tarpons (2019)

Home fields
- Germain Arena (2012–2017); RP Funding Center (2018)

League / conference affiliations
- Ultimate Indoor Football League (2012–2014); South Conference (2012); X-League Indoor Football (2015); American Indoor Football (2016); Southern Division (2016); Arena Pro Football (2017); American Arena League (2018)

Championships
- League championships: 2: UIFL: 2013; X-League: 2015
- Conference championships: 1: UIFL South: 2012

Playoff appearances (6)
- UIFL: 2012, 2013, 2014; X-League: 2015; AIF: 2016; APF: 2017

The Florida Tarpons were a professional indoor football team based in Lakeland, Florida, out of the RP Funding Center. Originally established in Estero, Florida, and playing out of Germain Arena, they began play in 2012 as an expansion team of the Ultimate Indoor Football League (UIFL). The Tarpons joined the X-League Indoor Football (X-League) during the 2015 season when the UIFL merged with the X-League. They played in the Arena Pro Football (APF) league in 2017 before the league became the American Arena League (AAL) for 2018. For 2019, there was an ownership transition that formed their own Florida-based league, called the A-League, and the team rebranded as the Lakeland Tarpons. The team was removed from the A-League schedule at the start of the 2019 season.

The Tarpons were Estero's second indoor football team; their first since arenafootball2's Florida Firecats which played from 2001 until the af2's demise in 2009. In addition, they are the fourth indoor football team in the Cape Coral-Fort Myers metropolitan area, with them and the Firecats joining the unrelated Fort Myers Tarpons which played in the National Indoor Football League's final season of 2007 and the Florida Stingrays which played the 2008 American Indoor Football Association season. (Both teams played at the Lee County Civic Center). The founders of the Tarpons are Andrew and Leah Haines and Michael & Anna Taylor. The Tarpons moved to Lakeland prior to the 2019 season.

== Franchise history ==
=== 2012: Expansion ===
In July 2011, the Florida Tarpons were announced as an expansion team for the 2012 UIFL season. On July 6, 2011, the Tarpons named, UIFL Co-Founder, Michael Taylor, as the team's inaugural head coach. The Tarpons went undefeated during the regular season, and advanced to Ultimate Bowl II after defeating the Lakeland Raiders in the UIFL South Finals. The Tarpons lost Ultimate Bowl II to the Cincinnati Commandos. Four players from the Tarpons 2012 roster were invited/signed to NFL Rookie Mini Camps: DL Joshua Long, WR Dwayne Frampton, DB Willie Williams, and DB E.J. Whitley. WR Carlos Singleton signed with the Tampa Bay Storm of the Arena Football League after the Tarpons season ended.

=== 2016: Move to the AIF ===
On October 7, 2015, the Tarpons announced that they were joining American Indoor Football. On July 18, 2016, the AIF ceased operations, leaving the Tarpons without a league.

=== 2017: Arena Pro Football ===
On October 20, 2016, the Tarpons were added to the Arena Developmental League (ADL) for the league's inaugural 2017 season. However, on November 10, the Tarpons announced they had joined the new Arena Pro Football (APF) instead and the ADL was soon renamed National Arena League upon the addition of the Jacksonville Sharks.

The Tarpons would play their first APF game against the Alabama Outlawz, also formerly of the X-League. The Tarpons won 42–18. At the end of the season, the Tarpons and the Richmond Roughriders played for the APF championship, losing to the Roughriders 61–75.

=== 2018: American Arena League ===
During the 2017 APF season, the league announced it would be merging with the Can-Am Indoor Football League to create the American Arena League (AAL) for the 2018 season. By the end of the 2017 season, the Tarpons and Roughriders were to only teams that had played a complete season in the APF and both teams joined the AAL. The Tarpons relocated to Lakeland, Florida, and the RP Funding Center after their lease in Estero expired. The Tarpons opened the season on the road with a 48–21 loss to the Atlanta Havoc. The following week they traveled to play the High Country Grizzlies, but the game was cancelled at the last minute due to winter weather and the game was not rescheduled. They played their first game at RP Funding Center on April 14, a 58–20 loss in a rematch with the previous season's APF champions, the Richmond Roughriders. The Tarpons would not win their first game until a 50–20 win over an AAL-affiliated travel-only team, the Austin Wild, on May 5. After another win over an AAL travel-only team, the Peach State Cats, the Tarpons were to travel to play the Georgia Doom in Macon, Georgia. However, the Tarpons then cancelled all remaining away games and announced their final game of the season would be at home against the Upstate Dragons on May 26. The Dragons then announced they would not travel to Lakeland and the Tarpons would then play the semi-professional Gulf Coast Tigers, thus ending their AAL season with a 2–3 record in league games actually played and a final league record of 3–5 after the various forfeits.

=== 2019: A-League ===
After one season in central Florida, the team rebranded as the Lakeland Tarpons. The Tarpons' ownership was also reorganized, with Micheal Taylor joined by former owner Andrew Haines, as well as Gary Tufford, Kacee Smith, and other locals. The new ownership group then announced on September 13, 2018, that they were launching their own league, called the A-League, to begin play in 2019 with several Florida-based teams, including the Gulf Coast Fire, Manatee Neptunes and Sarasota BigCats. However, the season was initially pushed back and then scheduled to only have games at RP Funding Center and Hertz Arena over several weeks in May and June 2019. In May 2019, the Tarpons and all games at RP Funding Center were removed from the schedule. The Gulf Coast Fire went undefeated and won the league championship, but after the season ended all other A-League websites, including the Tarpons, were redirected the Fire's website, which itself eventually suspended.

A Gulf Coast Tarpons was announced as a team in the International Football Alliance, but was removed shortly after announcement.

== Notable players ==
See Category:Florida Tarpons players

=== Awards and honors ===
The following is a list of all Tarpons players who have won league awards:

Season	Player	Position	Award
2012	Terrance Jones	DB	UIFL South Defensive Player of the Year
2012	Ross Gornall	K	UIFL South Special Teams Player of the Year
2012	Chris Wallace	QB	1st Team All-UIFL North
2012	Carlos Singleton	WR	1st Team All-UIFL North
2012	Donald Fusilier	WR	1st Team All-UIFL North
2012	James Barker	OL	1st Team All-UIFL North
2012	Greg Walls	OL	1st Team All-UIFL North
2012	Josh Long	DL	1st Team All-UIFL North
2012	Darrell Roseman	DL	1st Team All-UIFL North
2012	Harriel Moore	LB	1st Team All-UIFL North
2012	Tavares Woodley	LB	1st Team All-UIFL North
2012	Terrance Jones	DB	1st Team All-UIFL North
2012	Ross Gornall	K	1st Team All-UIFL North
2012	Sean Callahan	OL	Honorable Mention All-UIFL North
2012	E.J. Whitley	DB	Honorable Mention All-UIFL North
2012	Steven Turner	All-purpose	Honorable Mention All-UIFL North
2015	Javarous Faulk	DL	X-Bowl MVP

== Statistics and records ==
=== Season-by-season results ===
League champions	Conference champions	Division champions	Playoff berth	League leader

Season	Team	League	Conference	Division	Regular season				Postseason results
Season	Team	League	Conference	Division	Finish	Wins	Losses	Ties	Postseason results
2012	2012	UIFL	South		1st	11	0		Won UIFL South Finals (Raiders) 60–29; Lost Ultimate Bowl II (Commandos) 44–61
2013	2013	UIFL			1st	5	1		Won Ultimate Bowl III (Fury) 40–32
2014	2014	UIFL			2nd	4	4		Lost Ultimate Bowl IV (Fury) 23–60
2015	2015	X-League			1st	6	2		Won X-Bowl II (Marine Raiders) 65–23
2016	2016	AIF		Southern	2nd	7	1	0	Won Southern Semifinal (Steam) 71–20; Lost Southern Championship (Lions) 66–79
2017	2017	APF			2nd	5	1	0	Lost Championship (Roughriders) 61–75
2018	2018	AAL			DNF	2 (Note: 3 wins including a forfeit win)	3 (Note: 5 losses including the games they decided to forfeit)	0	
Totals						40	12	0	All-time regular season record (2012–2018)
Totals						4	4	—	All-time postseason record (2012–2018)
Totals						44	16	0	All-time regular season and postseason record (2012–2018)

=== Head coaches' records ===
Name	Term	Regular season				Playoffs		Awards
Name	Term	W	L	T	Win%	W	L	Awards
Michael Taylor	2012–2018	40	12	0	.769	4	4	UIFL South Coach of the Year (2012)
