= Rio Grande Valley Sol =

Indoor football team in Texas, US

- Founded: 2014
- Folded: 2015
- League: Lone Star Football League (2014); X-League Indoor Football (2015)
- Team history: Rio Grande Valley Sol (2014–2015)
- Based in: Hidalgo, Texas
- Arena: State Farm Arena
- Colors: Blue, Orange, Tan, White
- Owner: Jennifer Andrews
- Head coach: Bennie King
- Championships: (0)
- Playoff berths: (0)
- Dancers: Sol Dancers

The Rio Valley Grande Sol were a professional indoor football team based in Hidalgo, Texas. They were members of the X-League Indoor Football (XLIF) in their final season. The Sol played their home games at the State Farm Arena. They were founded in 2014 as members of the Lone Star Football League but withdrew their team from the league after being taken out of the championship game unfairly after their inaugural regular season.

The Sol were the third indoor football team to call Hidalgo home, following the Rio Grande Valley Dorados which played in af2 from 2004 to 2009. The second was the Rio Grande Valley Magic, which played in the Southern Indoor Football League in 2011 and in the Lone Star Football League from 2012 until their franchise charter was revoked in 2013.

== History ==
The Sol finished the 2014 LSFL regular season with an 8–4 record, tied for the league lead in wins, but finishing second due to tiebreakers. The Sol were to host the 3rd-seeded New Mexico Stars in a playoff game to advance to the LSFL Championship Game, but failed to meet unspecified "obligations" and were suspended by the league. The Sol finished the 2015 X-League Indoor Football season with a 5–2 record, good enough for second place and a slot in X-Bowl II. They folded in 2015, as did the league.

== Season-by-season results ==
Note: The finish, wins, losses, and ties columns list regular season results and exclude any postseason play.

League champions	Conference champions	Division champions	Wild card berth	League leader

Season	Team	League	Conference	Division	Regular season				Postseason results
Season	Team	League	Conference	Division	Finish	Wins	Losses	Ties	Postseason results
2014	2014	LSFL			2nd	8	4	0	
2015	2015	X-League			2nd	5	2	0	
Totals						13	6	0	All-time regular season record (2014-2015)
Totals						0	0	-	All-time postseason record (2014-2015)
Totals						13	6	0	All-time regular season and postseason record (2014-2015)

== Head coaches ==
Name	Term	Regular season				Playoffs		Awards
Name	Term	W	L	T	Win%	W	L	Awards
Jamaine Blalock	2014	8	4	0	.667	0	0	
Bennie King	2015	5	2	0	.714	0	0	

== Notable players ==
See Category:Rio Grande Valley Sol players
