= Bill Harris Arena =

Multi-purpose indoor arena in Birmingham, Alabama, U.S.

Coordinates: 33.495°N 86.874°W

- Fair Park Arena
- Interactive map of Bill Harris Arena
- Location: 2331 Bessemer Road, Birmingham, Alabama 35208
- Owner: City of Birmingham
- Capacity: 5,000

Construction
- Opened: 1987

Tenants
- Birmingham Bandits (CBA) (1991–1992); Birmingham Power (NWBL) (2001–2002); Magic City Court Kings (WBA) (2005); Birmingham Blitz (ABA) (2012–2014); Alabama Outlawz (XLIF) (2014–2015)

The W. F. "Bill" Harris State Fair Arena (called Bill Harris Arena or Fair Park Arena) is a 5,000-seat multipurpose indoor arena located at the Birmingham CrossPlex (formerly Alabama State Fairgrounds). The arena is used primarily for basketball, but also hosts concerts and other events. The arena has previously served as the home of the Birmingham Magicians and the Birmingham Blitz of the American Basketball Association and the Alabama Outlawz of X-League Indoor Football. It is named in honor of Bill Harris, longtime athletics director for Birmingham City Schools. In 2022, it served as the venue for the artistic roller skating and inline hockey competitions at the 2022 World Games.

== Professional teams ==
In 1985, the Puerto Rico Coquis of the Continental Basketball Association considered moving to Birmingham, but discussions with the Alabama State Fair Authority did not progress quickly enough to secure a commitment. The CBA did come to the Bill Harris Arena in 1991 when the Pensacola Tornados relocated to Birmingham as the Birmingham Bandits. The Bandits played for a year before moving again to Rochester, Minnesota.

The Birmingham Power of the National Women's Basketball League played home games at the arena and at Birmingham–Southern College's Bill Battle Coliseum during the 2001–02 season.

In 2005 the Magic City Court Kings of the World Basketball Association played home games at Bill Harris Arena and Miles College.

== Other events ==
A February 2001 basketball game between Stillman College and Miles College was interrupted by repeated brawls between fans of the opposing teams. The game was ended by order of the Birmingham Police Department and the 2,000 fans sent away.

The Bill Harris Arena has hosted numerous basketball championships for the Southern Intercollegiate Athletic Conference and the Southwestern Athletic Conference.

The arena currently hosts the monthly flea market at the fairgrounds, held on the first full weekend of each month.

Events and tenants
Preceded by Cobo Arena; Augusta Civic Center	Ultimate Fighting Championship venue UFC 10; Ultimate Ultimate 1996	Succeeded by Augusta Civic Center; Dothan Civic Center
