= Florida Marine Raiders =

Logo

General information
- Founded: 2011
- Folded: 2015
- Headquartered: Lakeland, Florida at the Lakeland Center
- Colors: Black, Carolina Blue, White, Gold
- Mascot: Gunny

Personnel
- Owners: Michael Mink; Robert Tannenbaum
- General manager: Neva Green
- Head coach: Keith Evans

Team history
- Lakeland Raiders (2012–2013); 'Florida Marine Raiders' (2014–2015)

Home fields
- Lakeland Center (2012–2015)

League / conference affiliations
- Ultimate Indoor Football League (2012–2013); X-League (2014–2015)

Championships
- League championships: 1: 2014

Playoff appearances (4)
- 2012, 2013, 2014, 2015

The Florida Marine Raiders (formerly the Lakeland Raiders) were a professional indoor football team; though they began play in 2012 as a member of the Ultimate Indoor Football League, for 2014 they became a charter member of the X-League Indoor Football (X-League). The Raiders were based in Lakeland, Florida, with home games played at the Lakeland Center. The Lakeland Raiders were founded by Michael Mink in his mother's vision of helping players get a second chance.

The Raiders were the second indoor football team to play in Lakeland, after the Lakeland Thunderbolts which played in the National Indoor Football League for the 2005 and 2006 seasons, then joined the American Indoor Football Association for the 2007 season, winning the league championship before folding that offseason.

At the conclusion of the 2013 UIFL season, the Raiders announced that they would be joining the newly formed X-League. On July 11, 2013, the franchise announced that they would be changing their name to the Florida Marine Raiders. In August 2015, the Marine Raiders announced they would not be returning in 2016.

== Players of note ==
=== All-League selections ===
- RB Levi Raines, Jr. (1)
- WR Reggie Ellis (1)
- OL Adam Duckett (1)
- DL Kendrick Stewart (1)
- LB Prince Hall (1)
- DB Maurice Francois (1)

=== Awards and honors ===
The following is a list of all Raiders/Marine Raiders players who won league Awards

Season	Player	Position	Award
2012	Drametrice Smith	LB	UIFL Defensive Player of the Year

|2013|| Drametrice Smith || LB || Team Defensive Most Valuable Player |}

|2014|| Levi Raines, Jr. || RB || Most Valuable Player |-

|2014|| Prince Hall || LB || Co-Defensive Player of the Year |}

== Season-by-season results ==
League champions	Conference champions	Division champions	Wild card berth	League leader

Season	Team	League	Conference	Division	Regular season				Postseason results
Season	Team	League	Conference	Division	Finish	Wins	Losses	Ties	Postseason results
2012	2012	UIFL	South		3rd	6	6		Lost South Conference Finals (Florida) 29-60
2013	2013	UIFL			3rd	6	3		Lost UIFL Semifinals (Corpus Christi) 58-68
2014	2014	X-League			2nd	5	3		Won X-Bowl I (St. Louis) 60-48
2015	2015	X-League			4th	5	3		Lost X-Bowl II (Florida) 23-65
Totals						22	15		All-time regular season record (2012–2015)
Totals						1	3	-	All-time postseason record (2012–2015)
Totals						23	18		All-time regular season and postseason record (2012–2015)
