= RP Funding Center =

Arena in Florida, United States

- RP Funding Center logo

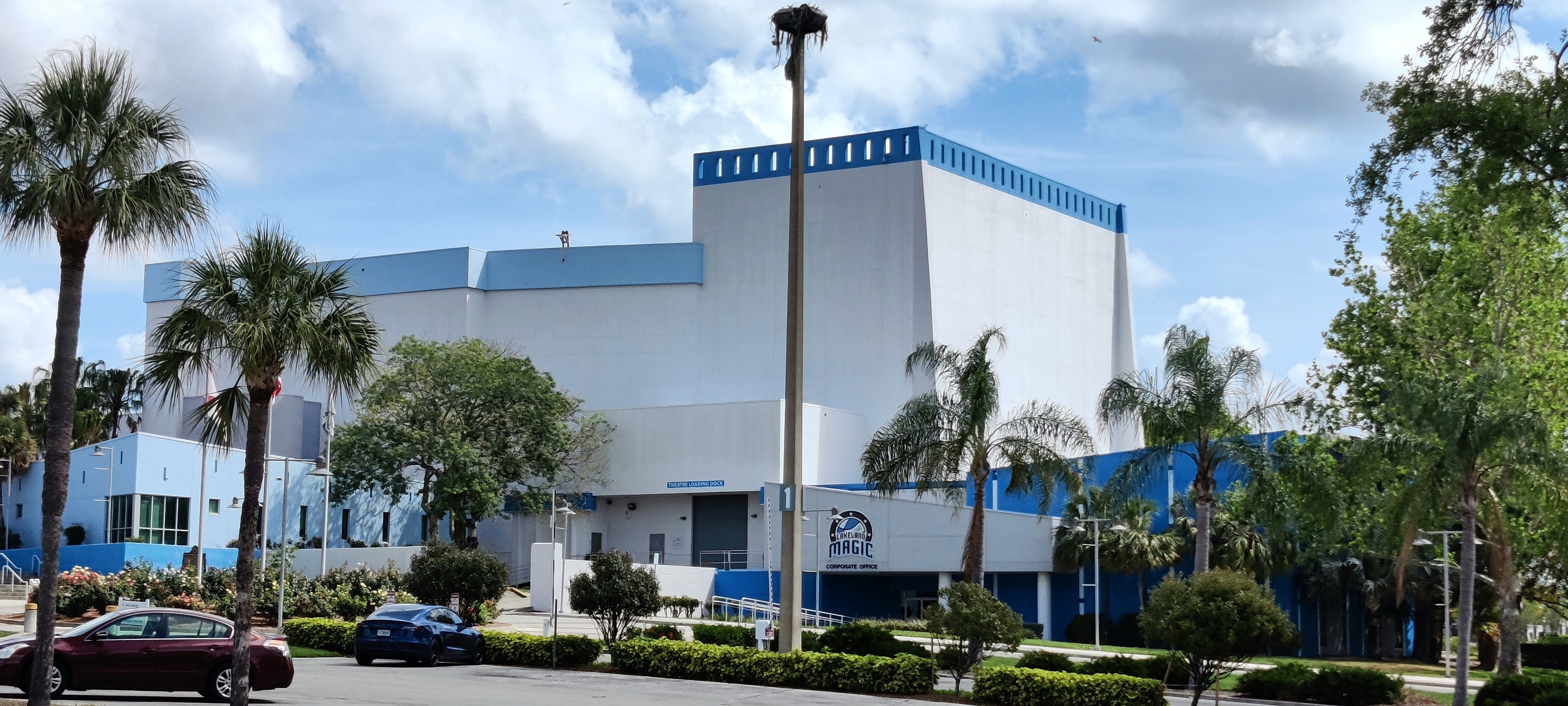

- Location within Florida Location within the United States
- Former names: Lakeland Civic Center (1974-94); Lakeland Center (1994-2017)
- Address: 701 W Lime St; Lakeland, Florida 33815-4534
- Location: Downtown Lakeland
- Coordinates: 28.041053°N 81.963619°W
- Owner: City of Lakeland
- Capacity: Venues: Jenkins Arena: 8,178; YouKey Theatre: 2,236; Exhibit Hall: 2,834; Sikes Hall: 1,865; Lake Hollingsworth Ballroom: 468; Lake Parker Room: 164; Lake Morton Room: 110

Construction
- Opened: November 16, 1974

Tenants
- Tampa Bay Rowdies (NASL) (1983–84); Lakeland Ice Warriors/Prowlers (SuHL/SHL) (1992–96); Lakeland Loggerheads (WHA2) (2003–04); Lakeland Thunderbolts (NIFL/AIFA) (2005–07); Lakeland/Florida Marine Raiders (UIFL/XLIF) (2012–15); Central Florida Jaguars (AIF) (2016); Florida Tropics SC (MASL) (2016–23); Lakeland Magic (NBAGL) (2017–23); Florida Tarpons (AAL) (2018)

The RP Funding Center (formerly the Lakeland Civic Center and the Lakeland Center) is a multipurpose entertainment complex in Lakeland, Florida, comprising a convention center, arena and theater. Formerly, it was the home of the Lakeland Magic, the Orlando Magic's affiliate in the NBA G League and the Florida Tropics SC of the Major Arena Soccer League.

== About ==
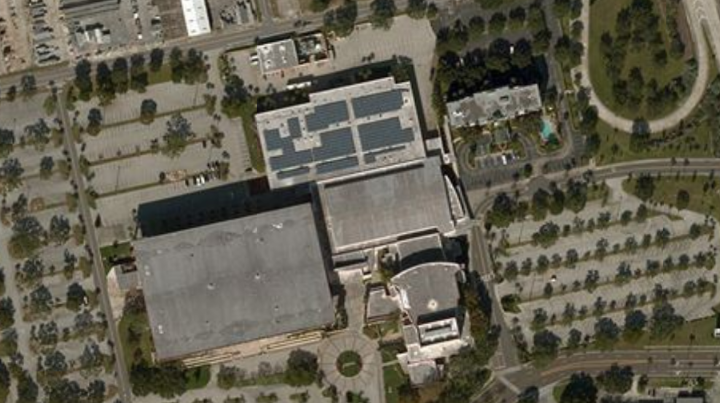
Aerial view of complex (c.2018).

The logo of arena until 2017.

It was home to the Lakeland Loggerheads of the World Hockey Association 2 during the 2003–04 season, the Lakeland Thunderbolts of the National Indoor Football League and later the American Indoor Football Association from 2005 until 2007, the Lakeland Raiders of the Ultimate Indoor Football League (later to be known as the Florida Marine Raiders of X-League Indoor Football) from 2012 until 2015, and the Central Florida Jaguars of the American Indoor Football in 2016. In 2018, the Florida Tarpons of the American Arena League relocated to Lakeland to use the arena for its home games.

The Tampa Bay Rowdies of the defunct North American Soccer League used the arena for indoor soccer on several occasions including three of their sixteen home games during the 1983-84 indoor season. This would also prove to be the league's final indoor campaign before suspending operations following the 1984 outdoor season.

In 1975 and 1976 the arena hosted National Hockey League exhibition matches between the Minnesota North Stars and the Atlanta Flames. Atlanta won both matches by the scores of 3–2 and 5–2, respectively. Beginning with their inaugural season (1992–93), the Tampa Bay Lightning used the center for training camp and exhibition games for several years. On September 23, 1992, hockey history was made as Manon Rhéaume became the first woman to play in an NHL exhibition game as the Tampa Bay Lightning played against the St. Louis Blues.

Elvis Presley played the Civic Center on April 27, 1975 (two shows, a matinee and an evening performance) and another evening performance on April 28, 1975. He played the center again a year later on September 4, 1976 (two performances, a matinee and an evening show).

Kiss performed here in 1976 when guitarist Ace Frehley was electrocuted leading him to later go on and write his song "Shock Me", included on the Love Gun album.

The Rolling Stones started their The Rolling Stones US Tour 1978 at the Civic Center on June 10, 1978.

Van Halen played the Civic Center on January 22, 1984 and April 10, 1986.

Miss USA 1985 was held at the Civic Center on May 13, 1985.

Metallica performed at the Civic Center alongside Queensrÿche for the Damaged Justice Tour on February 10, 1989.

Bon Jovi performed at the Civic Center on September 25, 1989.

Duran Duran played the Lakeland Civic Center's arena on March 26, 1984, as part of their Sing Blue Silver Tour.

Since 2019 it is the current home of the Central Florida Comic Con.
