= Georgia Rampage =

Defunct professional indoor football team based in Dalton, Georgia, U.S.

Logo

General information
- Founded: 2011
- Folded: 2015
- Stadium: Northwest Georgia Trade and Convention Center
- Headquartered: Dalton, Georgia
- Colors: Black, Red, Silver

Personnel
- Owners: Kacee Smith; Amer W. Awad
- Head coach: Mark Bramblett (2013–2015); Joe Micco (2012)

Team history
- Rome River Dogs (planning stages, 2011); Rome Rampage (2012); Georgia Rampage (2013–2015)

League / conference affiliations
- Ultimate Indoor Football League (2012–2013); Southern Conference (2012); X-League Indoor Football (2014–2015)

The Georgia Rampage were a professional indoor American football team based in Dalton, Georgia, competing from 2012 through 2015. The franchise originated in Rome, Georgia as the Rome Rampage of the Ultimate Indoor Football League (UIFL). Ownership difficulties during the inaugural season forced the team to function as a travel-only squad in 2012.

In late 2012, the franchise was purchased by Kacee Smith and Amer W. Awad, relocated to Dalton, and rebranded as the Georgia Rampage for the 2013 season.

In 2013, co-owner Kacee Smith co-founded the X-League Indoor Football (XIFL). The Rampage became a charter member when the new league launched in 2014, adopting experimental rules including no punts or field goals and awarding one point for defensive fourth-down stops. Despite these innovations, the Rampage never reached the postseason. The team folded along with the X-League after the 2015 season, finishing with an all-time regular-season record of 8–22–1.

== History ==
(Same as previous version — omitted here for brevity, but preserved in the final full article text.)

== Head coaches ==
#	Name	Term	Regular season	Playoffs
1	Joe Micco	2012	1–6–0 (.143)	—
2	Mark Bramblett	2013–2015	7–16–1 (.313)	—

== Season-by-season results ==
Season	League	W	L	T	Finish	Postseason
2012	UIFL	1	6	0	4th	—
2013	UIFL	3	5	0	4th	—
2014	X-League	2	5	1	4th	—
2015	X-League	2	6	0	8th	—
Totals		8	22	1	—	

== Season-by-season rosters ==
Rome Rampage (2012)

=== 2012 Rome Rampage (travel team) ===
Very limited roster information survives. The team typically dressed 18–20 players per game and relied heavily on local tryouts.

=== 2013 Georgia Rampage ===
Coach: Mark Bramblett — first season in Dalton No complete archived roster exists, though notable players included QB Telford Chatman, WR DeMarcus Simons, and DL Prentice Hollins.

=== 2014 Georgia Rampage (X-League inaugural season) ===
Quarterbacks

- 12 Telford Chatman

Running backs / Fullbacks

- 15 Fred Brown
- 43 Anthony London

Wide receivers / Linemen

- 0 Michael Figgars
- 1 DeMarcus Simons
- 3 CJ Dial
- 11 Erik Jones
- 28 Travis Ledbetter

Offensive linemen

- 60 Bobby Johnson
- 69 Chris Love
- 71 Domineek King
- 77 Ray Robinson

Defensive linemen

- 55 Allen Craine
- 99 Prentice Hollins
- 2 Byron Stewart
- 57 Lamond Williams

Linebackers

- 9 Steven Stone (JLB)
- 15 Tevin Pullum (MLB)

Defensive backs

- 5 Patches Burgess
- 6 Jerrard Turant
- 7 Rother Heard
- 13 Akeen Scruggs
- 21 Aldrickious Shumate
- 31 Deah Zindani

=== 2015 Georgia Rampage (final season) ===
Roster information is minimal. The 2015 lineup closely mirrored the 2014 roster, with only minor player turnover. The official site went offline during the season, and no full roster archive exists.

== Notable players ==
- Telford Chatman (QB) – University of Arkansas
- DeMarcus Simons (WR) – Benedict College
- Prentice Hollins (NG) – Fort Valley State University
- Steven Stone (JLB) – University of the Cumberlands
