= Dalton Convention Center =

Multi-purpose venue in Georgia, US

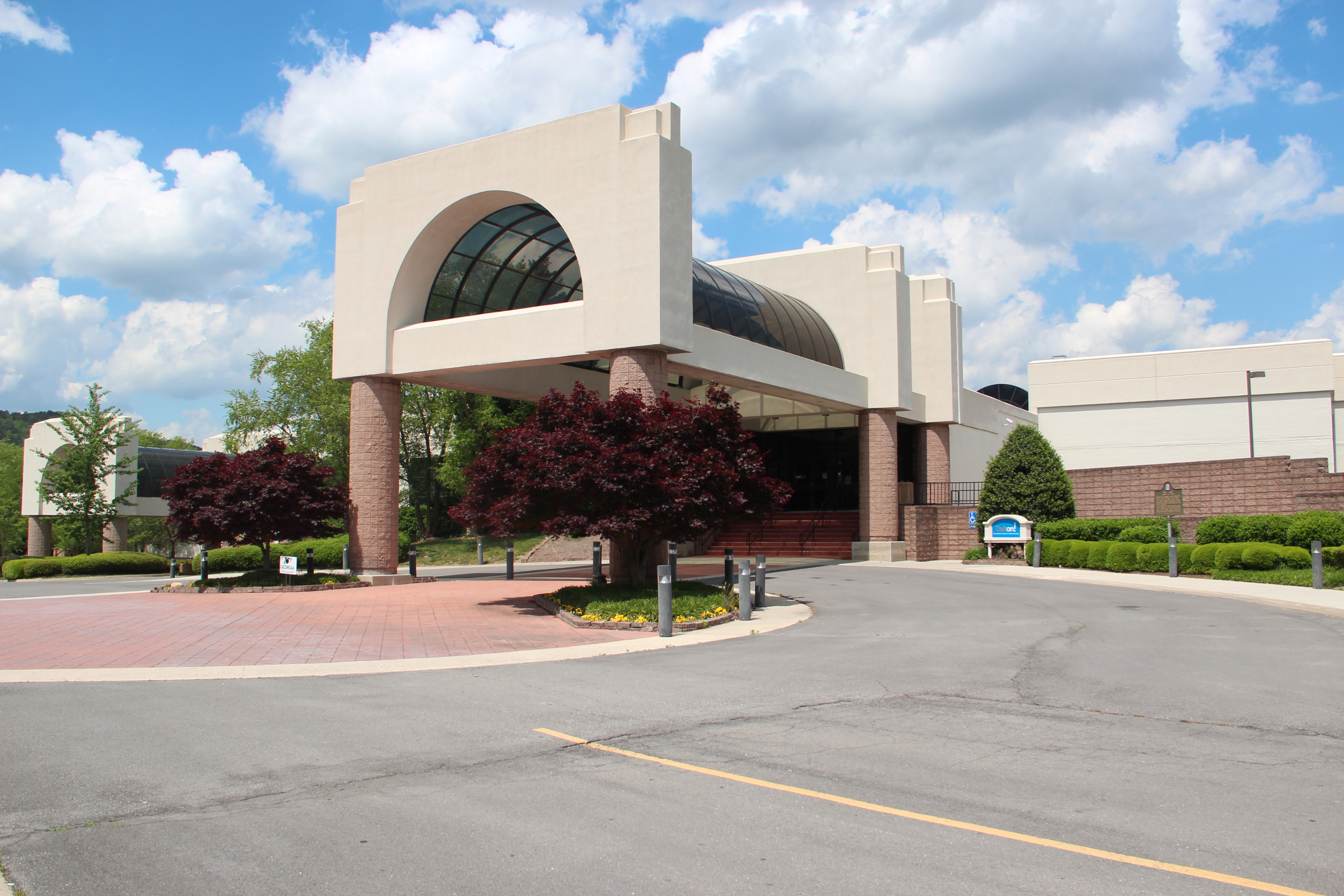
- Interactive map of Dalton Convention Center
- Former names: Northwest Georgia Trade and Convention Center
- Location: 2211 Dug Gap Battle RD., Dalton, Georgia 30720
- Coordinates: 34.75935°N 85.00537°W
- Owner: City of Dalton and Whitfield County
- Capacity: 2,100 maximum capacity

Construction
- Opened: 1991

Tenant
- Georgia Rampage (UIFL/XLIF) (2013–2015)

The Dalton Convention Center is a multi-purpose venue in Dalton, Georgia built in 1991. Owned by the city of Dalton and by Whitfield County, the Convention Center is operated by the general manager and director of tourism, Doug Phipps and Margaret Thigpen.

In addition to being home to the Georgia Athletic High School Coaches' Hall of Fame, the Convention Center's arena has a maximum seating capacity of 2,100 and was home to the Georgia Rampage of the X-League Indoor Football. Another indoor football team, the Peach State Cats, also announced the Dalton Convention Center as their home arena for the 2018 season, but became a traveling team and never played a home game in Dalton.
