= Family Arena =

Multi-purpose arena in St. Charles, Missouri, U.S.

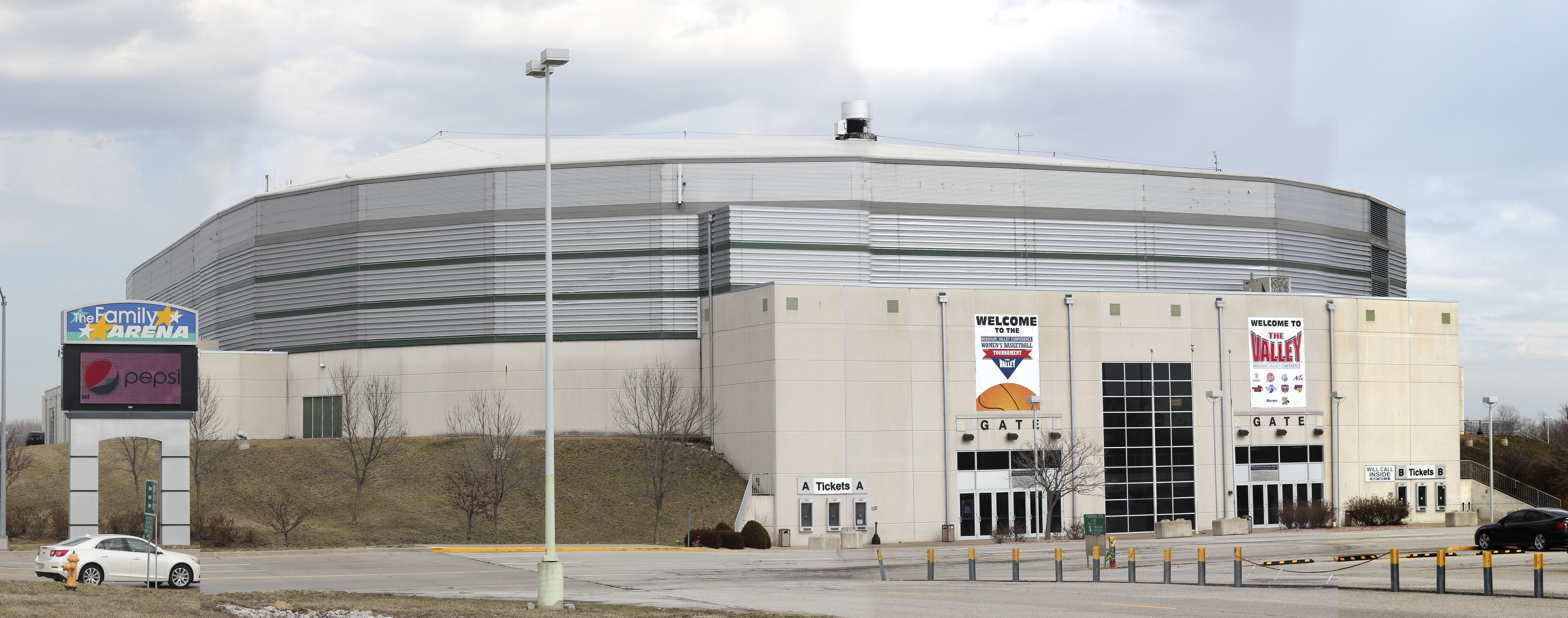
- Family Arena 2013

- Location within Missouri Location within the United States
- Location: 2002 Arena Parkway; St. Charles, Missouri 63303
- Coordinates: 38.747768°N 90.509443°W
- Owner: St. Charles County Public Arena Authority
- Operator: St. Charles County Public Arena Authority
- Capacity: Hockey: 9,643; Football: 9,755; Basketball: 10,467; Half-house concerts: 6,339; End-stage concerts: 7,736; In the Round concerts: 11,522
- Surface: Multi-surface
- Field size: Arena floor: 17,900 square feet (1,660 m^{2}); Concourse area: 22,000 square feet (2,000 m^{2})

Construction
- Groundbreaking: April 5, 1998
- Built: 1998–1999
- Opened: October 3, 1999
- Cost: $27 million ($52.2 million in 2025 dollars)
- Architects: Hastings & Chivetta Architects
- General contractors: Alberici Constructors, Inc.

Tenants
- Missouri River Otters (UHL) (1999–2006); St. Louis Swarm (IBL) (1999–2001); RiverCity Rage (NIFL/UIF/IFL) (2005; 2007–2009); St. Louis Steamers (WISL/MISL II) (2000–2001; 2003–2004); St. Charles Chill (CHL) (2013–2014); St. Louis Ambush (MASL) (2013–present); River City Raiders (AIF/APF) (2016–2017)

Website
- familyarena.com

The Family Arena is a multi-purpose arena in St. Charles, Missouri, built in 1999. Currently it is home to the St. Louis Ambush of the Major Arena Soccer League.

== Background ==
The arena seats 9,643 for hockey, 9,755 for football, 10,467 for basketball, 6,339 for half-house concerts and up to 11,522 for end-stage concerts. In addition to sporting events, concerts, circuses and ice shows the arena is also used for trade shows with a total of 39,900 square feet (3,710 m^{2}) of exhibit space (17,900 square feet (1,660 m^{2}) on the arena floor and 22,000 square feet (2,000 m^{2}) on the arena concourse).

Until Chaifetz Arena opened in 2008, Family Arena was the St. Louis stop for the Ringling Brothers and Barnum and Bailey Circus, Disney on Ice and Champions on Ice. The latter moved to Chaifetz that year while the circus and Disney on Ice moved to Enterprise Center to replace the St. Louis Billikens, who had also moved to Chaifetz.

=== Missouri Valley Conference women's basketball tournament ===
From 2008 to 2015, the Family Arena was host to the Missouri Valley Conference Women's Basketball Tournament.

=== Religious events and concerts ===
The Family Arena has served as an annual location for one of many world wide regional Bible conventions hosted by the well known cult Jehovah's Witnesses. The Christian rock band MercyMe performed at Family Arena annually from 2007 until 2013.

=== Professional wrestling ===
The Family Arena has also been host to nationally televised professional wrestling events. The arena was the site of the ECW's Wrestlepalooza 2000 event on April 16, 2000. The arena also hosted Total Nonstop Action Wrestling's Lockdown pay-per-view on April 15, 2007 and the 2010 edition on April 18, 2010. The arena also hosted Ring of Honor’s Gateway to Honor on February 29, 2020.

=== High school and college commencement ceremonies ===
The arena has hosted commencement ceremonies for Lindenwood University, Missouri Baptist University and Maryville University as well as for several area high schools.

=== 2017 NCAA Women's Frozen Four ===
The 2017 NCAA National Collegiate Women's Ice Hockey Tournament, known as the "Frozen Four," was held at the Family Arena in 2017. The quarterfinals were contested at the campuses of the seeded teams on March 11, 2017. The Frozen Four was played on March 17 and 19, 2017 at Family Arena, with Lindenwood University serving as the host. An agreement with the Big Ten Network resulted in the championship game being televised live for the first time since 2010. The tournament was won by Clarkson with a 3–0 win over Wisconsin, giving the Golden Knights their second title in program history.

=== Professional sports ===
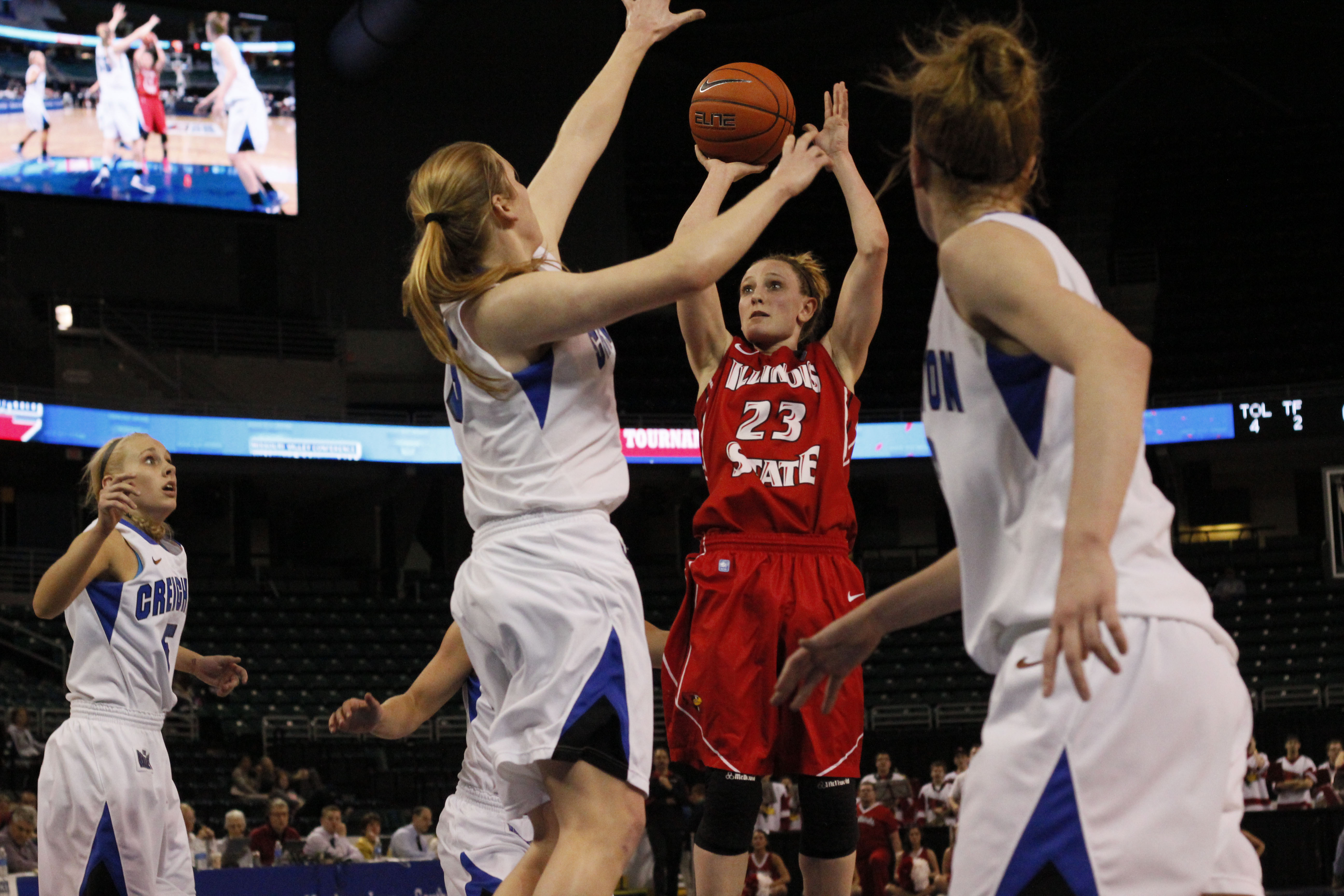
Illinois State vs Creighton in the 2013 MVC Women's Basketball Tournament

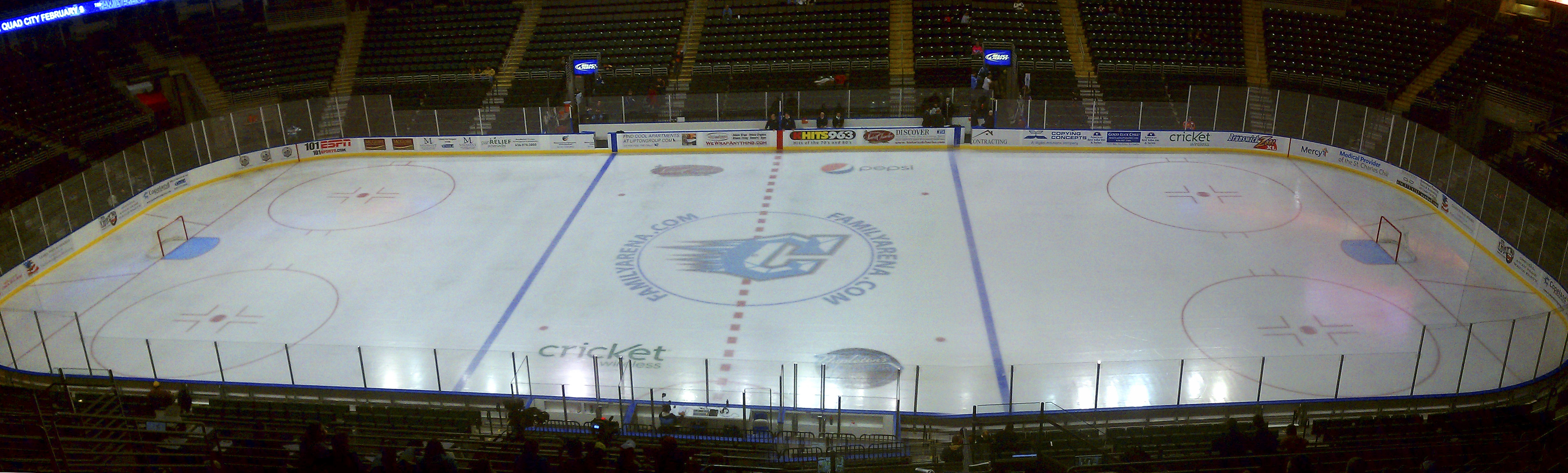
The Family Arena ice hockey rink set up for the St. Charles Chill

Family Arena served as the former home of the St. Louis Swarm basketball team, the Missouri River Otters and St. Charles Chill ice hockey teams, the RiverCity Rage and River City Raiders indoor football teams, and the St. Louis Steamers indoor soccer team.

=== Renovation ===
In 2024, the arena received its most extensive renovation since it opened. The seats in the lower bowl were replaced, scoreboards upgraded, and WiFi was added, among other upgrades.

Events and tenants
| Preceded by TNA Impact! Zone (2006); Liacouras Center (2009) | Host of Lockdown; 2007, 2010 | Succeeded by Tsongas Arena (2008); U.S. Bank Arena (2011) |
