= X-League Indoor Football =

Arena football league in the United States

- Current season, competition or edition: 2015 X-League Indoor Football season
- Sport: Indoor football
- Founded: 2013
- Founder: Kacee Smith; Michael Mink
- First season: 2014
- Folded: 2015
- CEO: Michael Mink
- President: Kacee Smith
- Commissioner: Michael Mink
- No. of teams: 3
- Country: United States
- Last champion: Florida Tarpons (1st title)
- Most titles: Florida Marine Raiders; Florida Tarpons (1 title each)
- Related competitions: American Indoor Football; Indoor Football League; Champions Indoor Football
- Website: XLeagueFootball.com

X-League Indoor Football (X-League) was a professional indoor American football minor league that began play in 2014 in the United States. The league was co-chaired by Michael Mink and Kacee Smith. On September 19, 2015, the league announced a merger with the future "North American Indoor Football" but later stated the merger would not go forward as announced and disbanded.

== History ==
The league was originally going to be known as the Xtreme Indoor Football League, but when LaMonte Coleman removed his teams (the Continental Indoor Football League's Marion Blue Racers and a new team that was to be known as the Columbus Beast; Coleman would eventually bring the Blue Racers to the league in 2015), the league re-branded themselves as the X-League. XIFL co-founder Andrew Haines, who had previously founded the Ultimate Indoor Football League and Atlantic Indoor Football League, left the XIFL before the league played its first game. Michael Mink, who had helped reorganize the AIFL into the American Indoor Football Association in 2007 and was involved with it until its merger in late 2010, then partnered with Smith as co-owner. Three of the six inaugural teams were from the UIFL.

== Rule differences ==
Unlike other indoor football leagues, the X-League allowed for the use of two-back sets (formations) that more closely reflected those in the outdoor game. Defensive players had to start in a standard 3-2-3 formation but, unlike the restrictions found in arena football, could move freely once the ball was snapped.

The league's distinguishing characteristic was its innovative, often bordering on gimmicky, scoring system. The X-Dash (a variant of the system the XFL used in lieu of the coin toss, but modified to avoid the injuries that were commonplace in the XFL) was used to decide possession at the beginning of each half and w also awarded two points to the winner. If a team's defense forced an interception, recovered a fumble, blocked a field goal, or forced a turnover on downs, the team is awarded a single point; if the turnover results in a touchdown on the same play (e.g. a pick-six), an additional point is added for a total of eight points. (The modern XFL has adopted a similar rule but only for overtime.) There was no punting, but field goals count for three points by placekick and four points by drop kick (the same as the Arena Football League, except without that league's rebound nets); original plans for the league had also eliminated field goals, but these were restored to the rules before the first season began play. On top of these features, the league allowed for a four-point conversion during the final minute of the game, using a special red football for the occasion.

The XLIF had limited revenue sharing, evenly distributing expansion fees and league-wide sponsorship revenue to other teams. Each team had 25 players (19 Active, 6 Practice Squad) and a weekly salary cap of $3,500. Each team played four home and four away league games during the inaugural season, but each had the option of playing up to two pre-season games prior to the season against teams outside the league.

== Teams ==
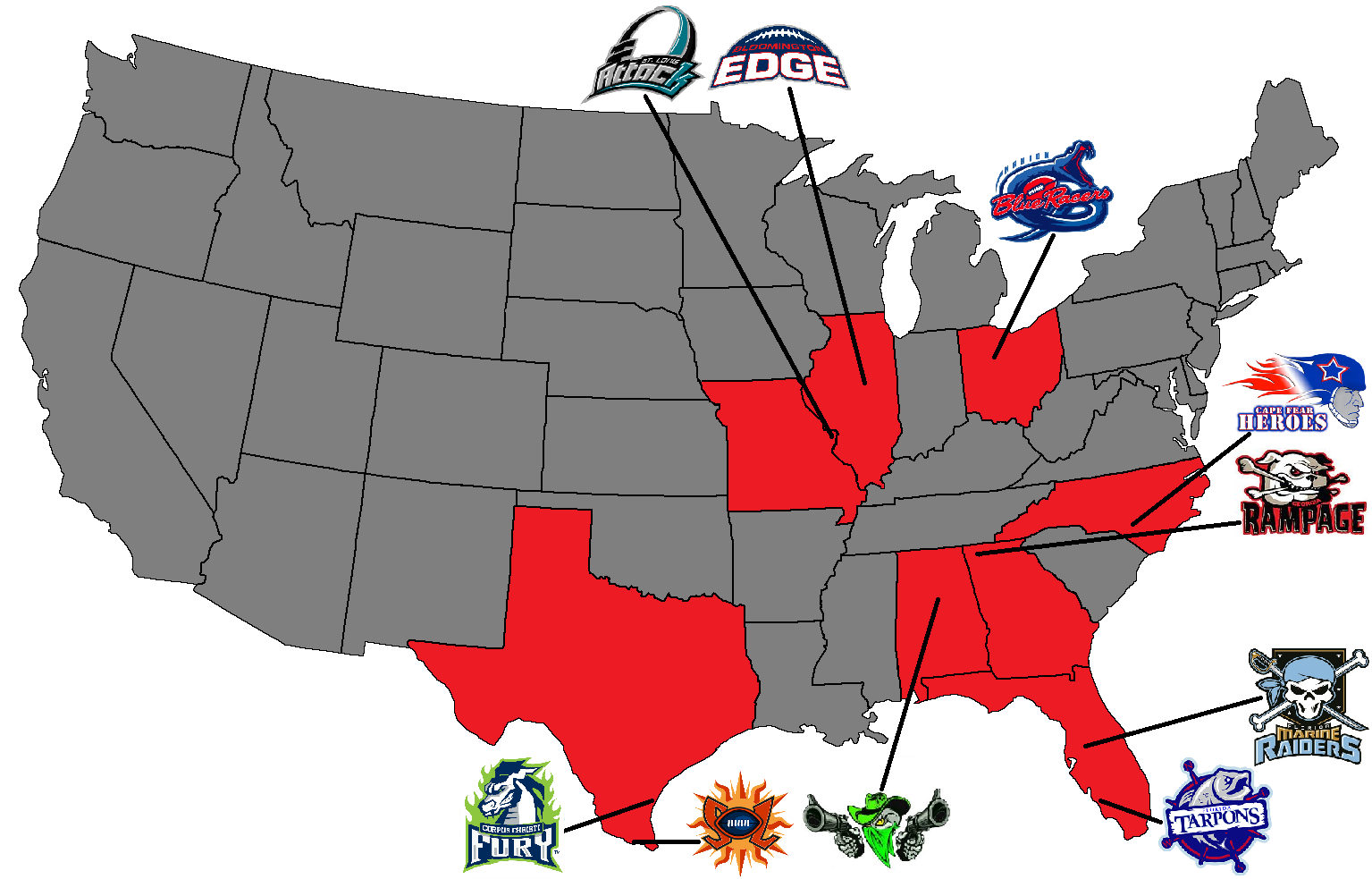
Map of X-League Teams

The Florida Marine Raiders, Georgia Rampage, and St. Louis Attack originated the X-League after leaving the UIFL. The first expansion team in the X-League was the Pennsylvania Steam who moved to Savannah, Georgia and became the Savannah Steam. The next expansion team was the Georgia Stealth who ended up folding before the season started. The 6th X-League franchise was the Alabama Outlawz from Birmingham, Alabama. On July 31, 2014 the Cape Fear Heroes of Fayetteville, N.C. announced that they were leaving the AIF to join the X-League for the 2015 Season. On August 7, 2014 the Corpus Christi Fury and Florida Tarpons jointly announced that they would leave the UIFL to join the X-League. The Rio Grande Valley Sol of Hidalgo, Texas announced they would move from the Lone Star Football League to the X-League on August 27, 2014. The Marion Blue Racers decided to move to the X-League from the CIFL for the 2015 season. On October 15, 2014 the Bloomington Edge moved to the X-League from the CPIFL making them the 10th team in the league. The Steam left in December, 2014 to join American Indoor Football. On June 16, 2015, the New Mexico Stars joined after a year of hiatus. On August 19, the Edge left to join the Champions Indoor Football. On August 23, the Cape Fear Heroes announced they were joining the Indoor Football Alliance. The same day the Marion Blue Racers announced they would also join the Alliance, later canceling those plans and joining AIF.

Team	City	Arena	Capacity	Founded	Joined	Head coach
Alabama Outlawz	Birmingham, Alabama	Bill Harris Arena	6,000	2013	2014	Lee Ellison
Florida Marine Raiders	TBD	TBD	TBD	2012	2014	vacant
Georgia Rampage	Dalton, Georgia	Northwest Georgia Trade and Convention Center	1,900	2012	2014	Mark Bramblett

=== Former ===
- Bloomington Edge - Moved to Champions Indoor Football for 2016.
- Cape Fear Heroes - Suspended by the league in June 2015; owners created a new league called Supreme Indoor Football which then became the core league in the Indoor Football Alliance. Last played in the American Arena League in 2019.
- Marion Blue Racers - Left the X-League after the 2015 season; joined American Indoor Football but ceased operations prior to their first season.
- Savannah Steam – Joined American Indoor Football for 2016.
