= 2016 Savannah Steam season =

- Owner: Bobby Dammarell
- General manager: Jenny Dammarell
- Head coach: Bobby Dammarell
- Home stadium: Savannah Civic Center; 301 West Oglethorpe Boulevard; Savannah, GA 31401

Results
- Record: 3-5
- Division place: 4th
- Playoffs: Lost Southern Division Semifinals 20-71 (Tarpons)

The 2016 Savannah Steam season was the third season for the indoor football franchise, and their second in American Indoor Football (AIF).

For 2016, the Steam announced that they would be playing at the Savannah Civic Center. The team would run into severe financial troubles during the season with over $20,000 owed in rent for the use of the Civic Center and several unpaid sponsors. Eventually, the unpaid sponsors took their claims to the local sheriff's department in order to initiate an investigation and obtain the fees they were owed.

== Schedule ==
Key: Win Tie Loss Bye

=== Exhibition ===
All start times are local to home team

Week	Day	Date	Kickoff	Opponent	Results		Location
Week	Day	Date	Kickoff	Opponent	Score	Record	Location
1	Saturday	March 26	7:05pm	South Carolina Ravens	W 31-26		Savannah Civic Center

=== Regular season ===
All start times are local to home team

Week	Day	Date	Kickoff	Opponent	Results		Location
Week	Day	Date	Kickoff	Opponent	Score	Record	Location
1	BYE						
2	BYE						
3	BYE						
4	Sunday	March 20	4:00pm	at Atlanta Vultures	W 2–0 (forfeit)	1–0	Columbus Civic Center
5	Monday	March 28	7:05pm	at Myrtle Beach Freedom	L 33-34	1-1	Myrtle Beach Convention Center
6	Saturday	April 2	7:00pm	at Georgia Firebirds	L 34-43	1-2	Albany Civic Center
7	BYE						
8	Sunday	April 17	7:05pm	Atlanta Vultures	W 32-19*	2-2	Savannah Civic Center
9	Saturday	April 23	7:05pm	Central Florida Jaguars	L 35-44	2-3	Savannah Civic Center
10	BYE						
11	Saturday	May 7	7:05pm	at Columbus Lions	L 21-100	2-4	Columbus Civic Center
~~12~~	~~Saturday~~	~~May 14~~	~~7:00pm~~	~~Georgia Firebirds~~	Forfeit by Firebirds due to travel issues		~~Savannah Civic Center~~
12	Saturday	May 14	7:00pm	LZ Falconz	W 72-0	3-4	Savannah Civic Center
13	Sunday	May 22	7:05pm	at Florida Tarpons	L 6-70	3-5	Germain Arena
14	BYE						

* – The Steam actually lost this game 19-32, however, the AIF later determined the Vultures had used illegal players and reversed the score instead of a just calling it a forfeit.

=== Standings ===
2016 AIF Southern standings
Team	W	L	PCT
y – Columbus Lions	8	0	1.000
x – Florida Tarpons	7	1	.875
x – Myrtle Beach Freedom	4	4	.500
x – Savannah Steam	3	5	.375
Georgia Firebirds	3	5	.375
Central Florida Jaguars	2	6	.250
Atlanta Vultures	1	7	.125

=== Playoffs ===
All start times are local to home team

Round	Day	Date	Kickoff	Opponent	Results		Location
Round	Day	Date	Kickoff	Opponent	Score	Record	Location
Div. Semifinals	Thursday	June 2	7:05pm	at Florida Tarpons*	L 20-71	0-1	Germain Arena

* — When initially announced, the Tarpons were set to play the Southern Division's third-seeded Myrtle Beach Freedom. On May 30, the Freedom replaced the Northern Division's fourth-seeded Central Penn Capitals against the West Michigan Ironmen. The Freedom's former position was replaced by the Southern Division's fourth-seed, the Savannah Steam.

== Roster ==
Savannah Steam roster
Quarterbacks: 15 Alexander Davis; 11 George Grant; Running Backs: 24 Ken Middleton; 7 Deveon Braithwaite; Wide Receivers: 18 Courtney Brantley; 3 Lee Dorsey; 8 Napoleon Scott; 13 Kevin Williams	Offensive Linemen: 77 E. J. Clowers; 46 Shawn Martinez; 72 Robert McCoy; 55 Terrance Williams; Defensive Linemen: 9 Reggie Givens; 52 Michael McCain; 66 Brandon Thomas	Linebackers: 44 Jarod Elser; 33 Glen Pond; 42 Nate Scola; Defensive Backs: 2 Devonte Green; 10 Eric Maxwell; 5 Dominique Reynolds; 6 Jamahl Street; Kickers: Currently vacant	Injured reserve: Currently vacant; Transfer list: Currently vacant; Refuse to report: Currently vacant; Rookies in italics Roster updated May 25, 2016; 22 Active, 0 Inactive
