= 2016 New Mexico Stars season =

- Owner: Tracy Duran; Crystal Duran
- General manager: Tracy Duran
- Head coach: Carlos Cavanaugh (fired on April 3, 1-0 record); John Fourcade (interim)
- Home stadium: Santa Ana Star Center; 3001 Civic Centre Drive; Santa Ana, NM 87144

Results
- Record: 6-1
- Division place: 1st
- Playoffs: Lost Southern Semifinals (Lions) 37-49

The 2016 New Mexico Stars season was the fourth season for the indoor football franchise, and their first in American Indoor Football (AIF).

On June 16, 2015, the Stars announced that they would be returning to football in 2016, playing the X-League Indoor Football. The team also announced that Carlos Cavanaugh was named the teams' new head coach. However, on October 1, 2015, the X-League folded, and the Stars joined American Indoor Football. On April 3, 2016, John Fourcade was named the head coach of the Stars.

== Schedule ==
Key: Win Tie Loss Bye

=== Exhibition ===
All start times are local to home team

| Week | Day | Date | Kickoff | Opponent | Results | | Location |
| Week | Day | Date | Kickoff | Opponent | Score | Record | Location |
|---|---|---|---|---|---|---|---|
| 5 | Saturday | March 26 | 7:05pm | at West Texas Renegades | Cancelled | | NYTEX Sports Centre |
| 7 | Saturday | April 9 | 7:05pm | West Texas Renegades | Cancelled | | Santa Ana Star Center |
| 8 | Saturday | April 16 | 7:05pm | at Colorado Charge | Cancelled | | Magness Arena |
| 10 | Saturday | April 30 | 5:00pm | Colorado Charge | Cancelled | | Santa Ana Star Center |
| 10 | Saturday | April 30 | 5:00pm | Austin Cobras | Cancelled | | Santa Ana Star Center |
| 11 | Saturday | May 7 | 6:00pm | Texas Stealth | Cancelled | | Santa Ana Star Center |
| 13 | Saturday | May 21 | 5:00pm | Colorado Charge | Cancelled | | Santa Ana Star Center |
| 13 | Saturday | May 21 | 6:00pm | Dallas Silverbacks | Cancelled | | Santa Ana Star Center |
| 14 | Monday | May 30 | 7:05pm | at Colorado Charge | Cancelled | | Magness Arena |

=== Regular season ===
All start times are local to home team

| Week | Day | Date | Kickoff | Opponent | Results | | Location |
| Week | Day | Date | Kickoff | Opponent | Score | Record | Location |
|---|---|---|---|---|---|---|---|
| 1 | BYE | | | | | | |
| 2 | BYE | | | | | | |
| 3 | Friday | March 11 | 7:05pm | Steel City Manace | W 34–14 | 1–0 | Santa Ana Star Center |
| 4 | BYE | | | | | | |
| 5 | BYE | | | | | | |
| 6 | Monday | April 4 | 7:05pm | at Corpus Christi Fury | L 53-59 | 1-1 | American Bank Center |
| ~~7~~ | ~~Saturday~~ | ~~April 9~~ | ~~7:05pm~~ | ~~Abilene Warriors~~ | Cancelled | | ~~Santa Ana Star Center~~ |
| ~~7~~ | ~~Saturday~~ | ~~April 9~~ | ~~7:05pm~~ | ~~Austin Colts~~ | Cancelled | | ~~Santa Ana Star Center~~ |
| 7 | Saturday | April 9 | 7:05pm | Steel City Manace | W 47-2 | 2-1 | Santa Ana Star Center |
| 8 | BYE | | | | | | |
| ~~9~~ | ~~Saturday~~ | ~~April 23~~ | ~~7:05pm~~ | ~~at Steel City Menace~~ | Cancelled | | ~~Southwest Motors Events Center~~ |
| 10 | Saturday | April 30 | 5:00pm | Capital City Warriors | W 90-6 | 3-1 | Santa Ana Star Center |
| ~~11~~ | ~~Saturday~~ | ~~May 7~~ | ~~5:00pm~~ | ~~Steel City Menace~~ | Cancelled | | ~~Santa Ana Star Center~~ |
| 11 | Saturday | May 7 | 6:00pm | New Mexico Outlaws | W 80-12 | 4-1 | Santa Ana Star Center |
| ~~12~~ | ~~Sunday~~ | ~~May 15~~ | ~~11:30am~~ | ~~Corpus Christi Fury~~ | Cancelled | | ~~Santa Ana Star Center~~ |
| 12 | Sunday | May 15 | 11:30pm | Quad-City Roadrunners | W 91-6 | 5-1 | Santa Ana Star Center |
| 13 | Saturday | May 21 | 6:00pm | Capital City Warriors | W 102-6 | 6-1 | Santa Ana Star Center |
| 14 | BYE | | | | | | |

=== Standings ===
2016 AIF Western Standings
| Team | W | L | PCT |
|---|---|---|---|
| y – New Mexico Stars | 6 | 1 | .857 |
| Corpus Christi Fury | 2 | 1 | .667 |
| Steel City Menace | 0 | 2 | .000 |

=== Playoffs ===
All start times are local to home team

| Round | Day | Date | Kickoff | Opponent | Score | Location |
|---|---|---|---|---|---|---|
| Div. Semifinals | Saturday | June 4 | 5:05pm | at Columbus Lions | L 37-49 | Columbus Civic Center |

== Roster ==
2016 New Mexico Stars roster
| Quarterbacks: 8 Gerard Kaufman; 12 Jeremy Soto; 10 Percy Turner; Running backs: 25 Kris Pettus; 4 P. J. Smith; 20 Martee Tenner; Wide receivers: 17 Joshua Carson; 3 Kurtis Green; -- T. J. Gretzner; -- Charles Johnson; 1 LaVaughn Macon; -- Kevin McFadden; -- Josh Vaughn | Offensive linemen: 70 Deron Jefferson; 77 Jamal Price; 52 Charles Stevens; 72 Charles Tillman; Defensive Lineman: 55 Gerald Blockman; 51 Jeffery Bradley; 54 Dwight Hamilton; 70 Deron Jefferson | Linebackers: 7 Kendrick Causey; 5 Chris Hernandez; Defensive backs: 0 Brashard Booker; 9 Darius Chapman; 22 Jameel Erving; 21 Royel Johnson; 6 Anthony Ratliff; -- Kiwaski Tenner; Kickers: 11 Brian Weems | Injured reserve: currently vacant; Exempt list: currently vacant; rookies in italics Roster updated April 28, 2016; 30 Active, 0 Inactive |
