= Joshua Frazier =

American football player (born 1995)

Profile
- Positions: Nose tackle, offensive lineman

Personal information
- Born: November 6, 1995 (age 31); Rogers, Arkansas, U.S.
- Listed height: 6 ft 3 in (1.91 m)
- Listed weight: 307 lb (139 kg)

Career information
- High school: Har-Ber (Springdale, Arkansas)
- College: Alabama (2014–2017)
- NFL draft: 2018: 7th round, 246th overall pick

Career history
- Pittsburgh Steelers (2018)*; Detroit Lions (2018)*; Birmingham Iron (2019); Orlando Guardians (2023)*; Massachusetts Pirates (2023); Rapid City Marshals (2024); Salina Liberty (2024); Pueblo Punishers (2026)
- * Offseason or practice squad member only

Awards and highlights
- 2× CFP national champion (2015, 2017)
- Stats at Pro Football Reference

Joshua Frazier (born November 6, 1995) is an American former professional football nose tackle. He most recently played both defensive and offensive line for the Pueblo Punishers of the National Arena League (NAL) in 2026. He played college football for the Alabama Crimson Tide. He was selected by the Pittsburgh Steelers in the seventh round of the 2018 NFL draft.

== College career ==
On November 22, 2014, Frazier recorded a sack with his first-career tackle against Western Carolina. He recorded his second-career sack two years later against Washington on December 31, 2016. On October 7, 2017, he forced his first-career fumble against Texas A&M. Frazier played as a top backup in 2017 and recorded 15 tackles, 2.5 for loss, three pass break-ups and a forced fumble.

== Professional career ==
Pre-draft measurables
Height	Weight	Arm length	Hand span	40-yard dash	10-yard split	20-yard split	20-yard shuttle	Three-cone drill	Vertical jump	Broad jump	Bench press
6 ft 2 7/8 in (1.90 m)	321 lb (146 kg)	34 1/4 in (0.87 m)	10 in (0.25 m)	5.27 s	1.87 s	3.07 s	4.70 s	7.95 s	23.0 in (0.58 m)	8 ft 3 in (2.51 m)	21 reps

=== Pittsburgh Steelers ===
The Pittsburgh Steelers selected Frazier in the seventh round (246th overall) of the 2018 NFL draft. On May 10, he signed his rookie contract. He was waived by the Steelers on September 1, 2018.

=== Detroit Lions ===
On December 12, 2018, Frazier was signed to the practice squad of the Detroit Lions.

=== Birmingham Iron ===
On January 9, 2019, Frazier was signed by the Birmingham Iron of the Alliance of American Football. He was placed on injured reserve on February 19. The league ceased operations in April 2019.

=== Retirement ===
Frazier tweeted his retirement from football in May 2019.

=== Orlando Guardians ===
Frazier came out of retirement in November 2022 and was drafted by the Orlando Guardians of the XFL as an offensive lineman. He was released on January 20, 2023

=== Massachusetts Pirates ===
In February 2023, he signed with the Massachusetts Pirates from the Indoor Football League. He was released on April 20, 2023.

=== Rapid City Marshals ===
Frazier signed with the Rapid City Marshals on October 3, 2023, according to their Instagram. He made their final roster for the 2024 season as a defensive and offensive lineman, as announced via a team press release on April 26, 2024. However, the team officially ceased operations on May 24, 2024, among continued financial struggles among the Arena Football League. The league shut down entirely soon afterward.
