= Central Florida Jaguars =

Professional indoor American football team

Logo

General information
- Founded: 2015
- Folded: 2017
- Headquartered: Bartow, Florida at the Bartow Park
- Colors: Black, Vegas gold, teal, white
- CentralFloridaJags.com

Personnel
- Owner: Neva Green
- General manager: Dave Douberly

Team history
- Central Florida Jaguars (2016–2017)

Home fields
- Lakeland Center (2016); Bartow Park (2017)

League / conference affiliations
- American Indoor Football (2016); Elite Indoor Football (2017)

The Central Florida Jaguars, commonly known as the Jags, were a professional indoor football team based in Lakeland, Florida.

The Jags were the third indoor football team to call Lakeland home; the first team was the Lakeland Thunderbolts which played in the National Indoor Football League from 2005 until 2006 and later the American Indoor Football Association in 2007 (where they won the AIFA Championship Bowl that year before folding). After that, the Lakeland Raiders would play in the Ultimate Indoor Football League from 2012 until 2013, after which they would later join X-League Indoor Football and change their name to the Florida Marine Raiders, playing in the 2014 and 2015 seasons before the league's folding

== History ==
The Jaguars joined American Indoor Football (AIF) before the beginning of the 2016 season and played their home games at the Lakeland Center. Their logo and colors were somewhat similar to the NFL's Jacksonville Jaguars. Following the 2016 season, the AIF ceased operations, leaving the Jaguars without a league. In October 2016, they became the charter member of the Elite Indoor Football Conference for the 2017 season. However, with the instability of the new league, they were removed from their home arena in 2017. All Elite Indoor Football Conference games were then announced to be played outdoors at Bartow Park in Bartow, Florida. The league and the Jags appear to have ceased operations during the 2017 season and all websites have lapsed.

== Final AIF roster ==
Central Florida Jaguars roster
Quarterbacks: 19 Timothy Evans; Running backs: 22 Dexter Legette; Wide receivers: 7 Preston Bailey; 14 Jarred Haggins; 84 Ricky Hunt; 8 Bryant Lavender; 15 Prentice Quince; 11 Eddie Ramos; 3 Dennis Rowe	Offensive linemen: 50 Ryan Crottie; 75 Jason Kelly; 53 Christopher Lewis; 29 Justin Reagan; 52 Wendell Williams; Defensive linemen: 90 Lucas Melo; 95 John Brown; 96 Samuel Chester; 92 Xavier Melton; 99 Kendrick Stewart; 51 Corey Swanson	Linebackers: 55 Nicholas Dorobiala; -- Will Lucas; Defensive backs: 25 LaBrian Adams; 17 David Crommer; 21 Kareem Givens; 20 Brandon Green; 13 Sa'Quan Hicks; 2 Michael Knight; 10 Cody Ward; Kickers: 12 Jesse Cortez	Injured reserve: currently vacant; Exempt list: currently vacant; rookies in italics Roster updated April 28, 2016; 28 Active, 0 Inactive

== Staff ==
Central Florida Jaguars staff
Front office: Owner – Neva Green; General manager – Dave Douberly; Director of sales & marketing – Mike Saladrigas; Director of operations – Ronnie Ghent; Director of scouting & personnel – Leo Etrienne; Director of merchandising – George Crottie	Head coach: Head coach – Myqual Spann

== Statistics and records ==
=== Season-by-season results ===
League champions	Conference champions	Division champions	Playoff berth	League leader

Season	League	Division	Regular season				Postseason results
Season	League	Division	Finish	Wins	Losses	Ties	Postseason results
2016	AIF	Southern	6th	2	6	0	

=== Head coaches' records ===
Name	Term	Regular season				Playoffs		Awards
Name	Term	W	L	T	Win%	W	L	Awards
Ronnie Ghent	2016	2	6	0	.250	—	—	

== 2016 season ==
2016 Central Florida Jaguars season
- Owner: Neva Green
- General manager: Robert Howe
- Head coach: Ronnie Ghent
- Home stadium: Lakeland Center; 701 West Lime Street; Lakeland, FL 33815

Results
- Record: 2–6
- Division place: 6th
- Playoffs: Did not qualify

Key: Win Tie Loss Bye

=== Exhibition ===
All start times are local to home team

Week	Day	Date	Kickoff	Opponent	Results		Location
Week	Day	Date	Kickoff	Opponent	Score	Record	Location
1	Saturday	April 16	7:05pm	South Carolina Ravens	W 69–0		Lakeland Center
2	Saturday	May 21	7:05pm	Osceola Ravens	W 58–18		Lakeland Center
3	Saturday	May 28	7:05pm	Palm Beach Phantoms	Cancelled		Lakeland Center

=== Regular season ===
All start times are local to home team

Week	Day	Date	Kickoff	Opponent	Results		Location
Week	Day	Date	Kickoff	Opponent	Score	Record	Location
1	BYE						
2	BYE						
3	Saturday	March 12	7:05pm	Florida Tarpons	L 34–84	0–1	Lakeland Center
4	BYE						
5	Sunday	March 26	7:05pm	Columbus Lions	L 42–90	0–2	Lakeland Center
6	Saturday	April 2	7:05pm	Myrtle Beach Freedom	L 34–47	0–3	Lakeland Center
7	Sunday	April 10	7:05pm	at Florida Tarpons	L 22–65	0–4	Germain Arena
8	BYE						
9	Saturday	April 23	7:05pm	at Savannah Steam	W 44–35	1–4	Savannah Civic Center
10	Saturday	April 30	7:05pm	Florida Tarpons	L 25–81	1–5	Lakeland Center
11	Saturday	May 7	7:05pm	at Atlanta Vultures	W 2–0 (by forfeit)	2–5	Georgia International Convention Center
12	Sunday	May 15	7:05pm	at Florida Tarpons	L 16–81	2–6	Germain Arena
13	BYE						
14	BYE						

=== Standings ===
2016 AIF Southern standings
Team	W	L	PCT
y – Columbus Lions	8	0	1.000
x – Florida Tarpons	7	1	.875
x – Myrtle Beach Freedom	4	4	.500
x – Savannah Steam	3	5	.375
Georgia Firebirds	3	5	.375
Central Florida Jaguars	2	6	.250
Atlanta Vultures	1	7	.125
