= Myrtle Beach Freedom =

Indoor football team

Logo

General information
- Founded: 2015
- Folded: 2016
- Headquartered: Myrtle Beach Convention Center in Myrtle Beach, South Carolina
- Colors: Navy blue, red, silver, white
- MyrtleBeachFreedom.com

Personnel
- Owner: Ronnie McCuin
- General manager: Ronnie McCuin
- Head coach: Ryan David (2016); Terrance Foster (interim)

Team history
- Myrtle Beach Freedom (2016)

Home fields
- Myrtle Beach Convention Center (2016)

League / conference affiliations
- American Indoor Football (2016): Southern Division (2016)

Playoff appearances (1)
- AIF: 2016

The Myrtle Beach Freedom were a professional indoor football team based in Myrtle Beach, South Carolina, and played their home games at the Myrtle Beach Convention Center. They were a member of American Indoor Football for one season until the league ceased operations in the summer of 2016.

The Freedom were the second indoor football team to call Myrtle Beach home, following the Myrtle Beach Stingrays of the National Indoor Football League, which only played part of the 2003 season in Myrtle Beach before moving to Florence, South Carolina, the following season.

== History ==
The Freedom had originally joined X-League Indoor Football (X-League), but the Freedom were forced to choose a new league after the X-League ceased operations. The Freedom joined American Indoor Football (AIF) in October, 2015.

On April 19, 2016, the Freedom replaced coach Ryan David with Terry Foster. Coach David, along with two assistant coaches, resigned from the team in protest of what they considered dangerous conditions for their players. Coach Foster came from the recently defunct travelling team, the Steel City Menace.

Following the conclusion of the 2016 season, the AIF announced that it was ceasing operations, thus leaving the Freedom without a league. The Freedom's assets ended up in the hands of the Myrtle Beach Sharks, who wore the Freedom's uniforms throughout their brief existence in Arena Pro Football.

In March 2017, the Freedom and the AIF were sued for providing unsafe field conditions during their May 23, 2016, home game against the Columbus Lions. Two of the Lions' players, Christopher Donnell Smith and David Toussaint, claim the turf came loose from the floor, which then caught their feet causing permanent damage to their knees and ending their careers.

== Final roster ==
2016 Myrtle Beach Freedom roster
Quarterbacks: 1 Daryll Clark; 8 Will Newsome; Running backs: vacant; Wide receivers: -- Gerron Bryant; 89 Ronnie Moses; 10 Dontrelle Sanford; 3 Edward Victorian; 9 Ty Zimmerman	Offensive linemen: 52 Mark Bechtel; -- Dontre Brown; 47 Torrance Buie; 56 Tim Fowler; Defensive linemen: 60 Henry Collao; 50 Deangelio Davis; 99 Nate Harris; 73 Dyrell Porcha; 94 Marco Vereen	Linebackers: -- Gabe Ostrow; Defensive backs: 21 Jason Booker; 13 Vaughn Cross; 23 Jeffery Kassoumis; 7 Franklin King; 44 Quincy Malloy; 25 Shaq McAllister; -- John Robertson; 4 Lindsey Robertson; 14 Shawn Sanders; -- Jonathan Sharpe; 25 Shaq McAllister; 24 Jaa Valentine; Kickers: 18 Victor Leventritt	Injured reserve: vacant; Exempt list: 14 Jason Livingston WR (Exempt); 3 Demario Turner DB (Exempt); rookies in italics; Roster updated May 25, 2016; 30 Active, 2 Inactive

== Final staff ==
Myrtle Beach Freedom staff
Front office: Owner/General manager – Ronnie McCuin; Director of Marketing/Advertising - Patty Mungo; Director of merchandise – Vickie Gill; Director of ticket sales – Andre White; Director of game day operations – Chad Fryar	Head coach: Head coach/offensive coordinator – Terry Foster; Assistant coaches: Defensive coordinator – Larry Green; Offensive/Defensive Linemen - Brian Bashaw; Strength and Conditioning -

== Statistics and records ==
=== Season result ===
League champions	Division champions	Playoff berth	League leader

Season	League	Division	Regular season				Postseason results
Season	League	Division	Finish	Wins	Losses	Ties	Postseason results
2016	AIF	Southern	3rd	4	4	0	Lost Northern Semifinals (Ironmen) 37–78
Totals				4	5	0	All-time record (2016)

=== Head coaches' records ===
Name	Term	Regular season				Playoffs		Awards
Name	Term	W	L	T	Win%	W	L	Awards
Ryan David	2016	2	2	0	.500	—	—	
Terry Foster	2016	2	2	0	.500	0	1	

== 2016 season ==
2016 Myrtle Beach Freedom season
- Owner: Ronnie McCuin
- General manager: Ronnie McCuin
- Head coach: Ryan David; Terry Foster (interim)
- Home stadium: Myrtle Beach Convention Center

Results
- Record: 4–4
- Division place: 3rd
- Playoffs: Lost Northern Semifinals (Ironmen) 37–78

Key: Win Tie Loss Bye

=== Exhibition ===
All start times were local to home team

Week	Day	Date	Kickoff	Opponent	Results		Location
Week	Day	Date	Kickoff	Opponent	Score	Record	Location
1	Sunday	March 6	7:05pm	Carolina Dynasty	W 49–22	1–0	Myrtle Beach Convention Center
2	Monday	May 9	7:05pm	South Carolina Ravens	W 43–20	2–0	Myrtle Beach Convention Center

=== Regular season ===
All start times were local to home team

Week	Day	Date	Kickoff	Opponent	Results		Location
Week	Day	Date	Kickoff	Opponent	Score	Record	Location
1	BYE						
2	BYE						
3	BYE						
4	BYE						
5	Monday	March 28	7:05pm	Savannah Steam	W 34–33	1–0	Myrtle Beach Convention Center
6	Saturday	April 2	7:05pm	at Central Florida Jaguars	W 47–34	2–0	Lakeland Center
7	Monday	April 11	7:05pm	Georgia Firebirds	L 20–49	2–1	Myrtle Beach Convention Center
8	Saturday	April 16	7:05pm	at Columbus Lions	L 15–65	2–2	Columbus Civic Center
9	Saturday	April 23	7:05pm	at Georgia Firebirds	L –56	2–3	Albany Civic Center
10	Sunday	May 1	7:05pm	at Atlanta Vultures	W 2–0 (by forfeit)	3–3	Georgia International Convention Center
11	BYE						
~~12~~	~~Monday~~	~~May 16~~	~~7:05pm~~	~~Atlanta Vultures~~	Cancelled		~~Myrtle Beach Convention Center~~
12	Monday	May 16	7:05pm	Carolina Commandos	W 83–18	4–3	Myrtle Beach Convention Center
13	Monday	May 23	7:05pm	Columbus Lions	L 15–52	4–4	Myrtle Beach Convention Center
14	BYE						

=== Standings ===
2016 AIF Southern standings
Team	W	L	PCT
y – Columbus Lions	8	0	1.000
x – Florida Tarpons	7	1	.875
x – Myrtle Beach Freedom	4	4	.500
x – Savannah Steam	3	5	.375
Georgia Firebirds	3	5	.375
Central Florida Jaguars	2	6	.250
Atlanta Vultures	1	7	.125

=== Playoffs ===
When the playoff schedule was initially announced, the Freedom were set to play the Southern Division's second-seeded Florida Tarpons. On May 30, the Freedom replaced the Northern Division's fourth-seeded Central Penn Capitals against the West Michigan Ironmen. The Freedom's former position was replaced by the Southern Division's fourth-seed, the Savannah Steam.

Round	Day	Date	Kickoff	Opponent	Score	Location
Div. Semifinals	Saturday	June 4	7:05pm	at West Michigan Ironmen	L 37–78	L. C. Walker Arena
