= 2016 Florida Tarpons season =

- Owner: Michael Taylor; Anne Taylor
- General manager: Michael Taylor
- Head coach: Michael Taylor
- Home stadium: Germain Arena; 11000 Everblades Parkway; Estero, FL 33928

Results
- Record: 7-1
- Division place: 2nd
- Playoffs: Won Southern Division Semi-Final 71-20 (Steam); Lost Southern Championship 66-79 (Lions)

The 2016 Florida Tarpons season was the fifth season for the American indoor football franchise, and their first in American Indoor Football.

On October 7, 2015, the Tarpons announced that they were joining American Indoor Football.

== Schedule ==
Key: Win Tie Loss Bye

=== Regular season ===
All start times are local to home team

Week	Day	Date	Kickoff	Opponent	Results		Location
Week	Day	Date	Kickoff	Opponent	Score	Record	Location
1	BYE						
2	BYE						
3	Saturday	March 12	7:05pm	at Central Florida Jaguars	W 84–34	1–0	Lakeland Center
4	BYE						
5	BYE						
6	Sunday	April 3	7:05pm	at Atlanta Vultures	W 2-0 (forfeit)	2-0	Georgia International Convention Center
7	Sunday	April 10	7:05pm	Central Florida Jaguars	W 65-22	3-0	Germain Arena
8	Sunday	April 17	7:05pm	Georgia Firebirds	W 52-31	4-0	Germain Arena
9	Saturday	April 23	7:05pm	at Columbus Lions	L 54-68	4-1	Columbus Civic Center
10	Saturday	April 30	7:05pm	at Central Florida Jaguars	W 81-25	5-1	Lakeland Center
11	BYE						
12	Sunday	May 15	7:05pm	Central Florida Jaguars	W 81-16	6-1	Germain Arena
13	Sunday	May 22	7:05pm	Savannah Steam	W 70-6	7-1	Germain Arena
14	BYE						

=== Standings ===
2016 AIF Southern standings
Team	W	L	PCT
y – Columbus Lions	8	0	1.000
x – Florida Tarpons	7	1	.875
x – Myrtle Beach Freedom	4	4	.500
x – Savannah Steam	3	5	.375
Georgia Firebirds	3	5	.375
Central Florida Jaguars	2	6	.250
Atlanta Vultures	1	7	.125

=== Playoffs ===
All start times are local to home team

Round	Day	Date	Kickoff	Opponent	Results		Location
Round	Day	Date	Kickoff	Opponent	Score	Record	Location
Div. Semifinals	Thursday	June 2	7:05pm	Savannah Steam*	W 71-20	1-0	Germain Arena
Div. Championship	Saturday	June 11	7:05pm	at Columbus Lions	L 66-79	1-1	Columbus Civic Center

* — When initially announced, the Tarpons were set to play the Southern Division's third-seeded Myrtle Beach Freedom. On May 30, the Freedom replaced the Northern Division's fourth-seeded Central Penn Capitals against the West Michigan Ironmen. The Freedom's former position was replaced by the Southern Division's fourth-seed, the Savannah Steam.

== Roster ==
2016 Florida Tarpons roster
Quarterbacks: 17 Teddy Joseph; 7 Chris Wallace; Running backs: 20 Rob Taylor; Wide receivers: 1 Markihe Anderson; 16 Matt Emans; 27 Alex Irastorza; 9 Robert Jones; 14 Tim Lukas; 11 Tristan Purifoy; 10 Josh Young	Offensive linemen: 72 Mike Dunn; 52 Raymond James; 99 Jason Peacock; 8 Greg Walls; 55 Thed Watson; Defensive linemen: 90 Bar'ee Boyd; 21 Dasmine Cathey; 54 Martaze Jackson; 58 Cadarreus Mason; 94 Wes Tunuufi-Sauvao	Linebackers: 15 James Lovett Jr.; 6 Mikell Mair; 3 Danny Young; Defensive backs: 24 Randall Burden; 22 Michael Carey; 23 Vince Hill; 5 Duran Lowe; 4 Schon Thomas; 2 Jeremy Ware; Kickers: 12 Rey Hernandez	Injured reserve: Currently vacant; Transfer list: 2 Nick Addison DB (Exempt); Refuse to report: Currently vacant; Rookies in italics Roster updated May 31, 2016; 30 Active, 1 Inactive
