= 2016 Columbus Lions season =

- Owner: John Hargrove; Keith Norred; Kike Seda; Skip Seda; Rich Jacobson
- General manager: Tanema Willock
- Head coach: Jason Gibson
- Home stadium: Columbus Civic Center

Results
- Record: 8–0
- Division place: 1st
- Playoffs: Won Southern Semifinals (Stars) 49–37; Won Southern Championship (Tarpons) 79–66; Won AIF Championship (Ironmen) 74–32

The 2016 Columbus Lions season was the tenth season for the indoor football franchise, and their first in American Indoor Football.

== Schedule ==
Key: Win Tie Loss Bye

=== Regular season ===
All start times are local to home team

Week	Day	Date	Kickoff	Opponent	Results		Location
Week	Day	Date	Kickoff	Opponent	Score	Record	Location
1	BYE						
2	BYE						
3	BYE						
4	Sunday	March 20	4:00pm	Georgia Firebirds	W 86–0	1–0	Columbus Civic Center
5	Saturday	March 26	7:05pm	at Central Florida Jaguars	W 90–42	2–0	Lakeland Center
6	BYE						
7	Saturday	April 9	7:05pm	Atlanta Vultures	W 65–8	3–0	Columbus Civic Center
8	Saturday	April 16	7:05pm	Myrtle Beach Freedom	W 65–15	4–0	Columbus Civic Center
9	Saturday	April 23	7:05pm	Florida Tarpons	W 68–54	5–0	Columbus Civic Center
10	Saturday	April 30	7:05pm	at Georgia Firebirds	W 73–18	6–0	Albany Civic Center
11	Saturday	May 7	7:05pm	Savannah Steam	W 100–21	7–0	Columbus Civic Center
12	BYE						
13	Monday	May 23	7:05pm	at Myrtle Beach Freedom	W 52–15	8–0	Myrtle Beach Convention Center
14	BYE						

=== Standings ===
2016 AIF Southern standings
Team	W	L	PCT
y – Columbus Lions	8	0	1.000
x – Florida Tarpons	7	1	.875
x – Myrtle Beach Freedom	4	4	.500
x – Savannah Steam	3	5	.375
Georgia Firebirds	3	5	.375
Central Florida Jaguars	2	6	.250
Atlanta Vultures	1	7	.125

=== Playoffs ===
All start times are local to home team

Round	Day	Date	Kickoff	Opponent	Score	Location
Div. Semifinals	Saturday	June 4	5:05pm	New Mexico Stars	W 49–37	Columbus Civic Center
Div. Championship	Saturday	June 11	7:05pm	Florida Tarpons	W 79–66	Columbus Civic Center
AIF Championship	Saturday	June 18	7:00pm	West Michigan Ironmen	W 72–34	Columbus Civic Center

== Roster ==
2016 Columbus Lions roster
Quarterbacks: 16 Darren Daniel; 12 Casey Kacz; -- Cecil Lester; Running backs: Currently vacant; Wide receivers: 19 Byron Dickerson; 6 Jarmon Fortson; 11 Kevin Fuller; 5 Kyle Griswould; 1 John Harris; 20 Jamon Langford; 18 Michael Reeve	Offensive linemen: 72 Ryne Holland; -- Robert Jones; 75 Brandon Thomas; 58 Dion Small; 55 Aaron Wheeler; Defensive linemen: 44 Logan Ingle; 98 Trey Jacobs; 13 Joe Marshall; 50 Shonquez Nelson; 7 Kendrick Washington	Linebackers: 34 Larry Edwards; 10 Davin Hawkins; 21 Zach Vallafskey; Defensive backs: 4 Damian Daniels; 15 Rashad Greene; 3 Jerome Junior; 2 Roshawn Marshall; -- Chris Smith; 9 Tracy Wilson; Kickers: -- Trey Crum	Injured reserve: 8 David Toussaint DB (IR); Refuse to report: Currently vacant; Exempt: 14 Lindsey Wolfe K (Exempt); Rookies in italics Roster updated May 25, 2016; 30 Active, 2 Inactive
