= 2016 Georgia Firebirds season =

- Owner: Gridiron Central Group
- General manager: Terence Fowler
- Head coach: David Daniels (fired on March 21, 0-1 record); Antwone Savage (interim)
- Home stadium: Albany Civic Center; 100 West Oglethorpe Boulevard; Albany, GA 31701

Results
- Record: 3–5
- Division place: 5th
- Playoffs: Did not qualify

The 2016 Georgia Firebirds season was the first season for the American indoor football franchise, and their first in American Indoor Football.

On November 18, 2015, the Firebirds finalized the contract with the city of Albany, Georgia, and the Albany Civic Center, to play indoor football for the 2016 season. Prior to becoming an indoor team, the organization had played in various semi-pro outdoor leagues.

On March 20, 2016, the Firebirds lost their first ever game in franchise history. The following day, Daniels was fired as the Firebirds head coach, replaced by Antwone Savage.

On May 14, 2016, the Firebirds were forced to forfeit their final game at the Savannah Steam due to transportation issues.

== Schedule ==
Key: Win Tie Loss Bye

=== Exhibition ===
All start times are local to home team

Week	Day	Date	Kickoff	Opponent	Results		Location
Week	Day	Date	Kickoff	Opponent	Score	Record	Location
1	Wednesday	March 9	7:00pm	Capital City Cobras	W 42–22	1–0	Albany Civic Center
2	Saturday	May 7	7:00pm	South Carolina Ravens	W 73–24	2–0	Albany Civic Center

=== Regular season ===
All start times are local to home team

Week	Day	Date	Kickoff	Opponent	Results		Location
Week	Day	Date	Kickoff	Opponent	Score	Record	Location
1	BYE						
2	BYE						
3	BYE						
4	Sunday	March 20	4:00pm	at Columbus Lions	L 0–86	0–1	Columbus Civic Center
5	Saturday	March 26	7:00pm	Atlanta Vultures	L 38–40	0–2	Albany Civic Center
6	Saturday	April 2	7:00pm	Savannah Steam	W 43–34	1–2	Albany Civic Center
7	Monday	April 11	7:05pm	at Myrtle Beach Freedom	W 49–20	2–2	Myrtle Beach Convention Center
8	Sunday	April 17	7:05pm	at Florida Tarpons	L 31–52	2–3	Germain Arena
9	Saturday	April 23	7:00pm	Myrtle Beach Freedom	W 56–43	3–3	Albany Civic Center
10	Saturday	April 30	7:00pm	Columbus Lions	L 19–73	3–4	Albany Civic Center
11	BYE						
12	Saturday	May 14	7:00pm	at Savannah Steam	L 0–2 (forfeit)	3–5	Savannah Civic Center
13	BYE						
14	BYE						

=== Standings ===
2016 AIF Southern standings
Team	W	L	PCT
y – Columbus Lions	8	0	1.000
x – Florida Tarpons	7	1	.875
x – Myrtle Beach Freedom	4	4	.500
x – Savannah Steam	3	5	.375
Georgia Firebirds	3	5	.375
Central Florida Jaguars	2	6	.250
Atlanta Vultures	1	7	.125
