= Atlanta Vultures =

Logo

General information
- Founded: 2015
- Folded: 2016
- Headquartered: Georgia International Convention Center in Atlanta, Georgia
- Colors: Charcoal, gray, silver, blue, white
- Atlanta Vultures

Personnel
- Owners: Barrington Young; Janice Strong
- General manager: Barrington Young
- Head coach: Cedric Roach
- President: Barrington Young

Team history
- Atlanta Vultures (2016)

Home fields
- Georgia International Convention Center (2016)

League / conference affiliations
- American Indoor Football (2016): Southern Division (2016)

The Atlanta Vultures were a professional indoor football team and a member of American Indoor Football (AIF) that played part of the 2016 season. Based in Atlanta, Georgia, the Vultures were to play their home games at the Georgia International Convention Center.

The Vultures are Atlanta's second AIF team, following the Atlanta Sharks who began play in 2014 and folded during the 2015 season.

The Vultures ran into operational issues when they found their home arena lacked quality playing turf. The Vultures would end up cancelling all home games and played three road games during the season, winning two of the three games. However, after winning the third game against the Savannah Steam on April 17, the AIF ruled that the Vultures had played the game using illegal players and reversed the score of the game (essentially making it a forfeit). The Vultures folded and took down their website later that week.

== Roster ==
Atlanta Vultures roster
Quarterbacks: -- Sherrod Murray; -- Patrick Riley; Running backs: -- Chris Anderson; -- Austin Blackshear; -- Derrick Thomas; Wide receivers: -- Christopher Crosby; -- Jordan Ellison; -- Julius Eppinger; -- Rico King; -- Moshiah Lightburn; -- Rashad Tukes; -- Luke Williamson	Offensive linemen: -- Tremaine Byrd; -- DeQuan Murray; -- Tino Roland; -- John Whitehead; Defensive linemen: -- Deonte Cruse; -- Craig Neece; -- Eddie Verrett	Linebackers: -- James McGoogan; -- Trent Newton; -- Blayke Spears; Defensive backs: -- Kendall Connor; -- Juwan King; -- Sammy Roach; -- Aldrickious Shumake; -- John Strickland; Kickers: currently vacant	Injured reserve: currently vacant; Exempt list: currently vacant; Practice squad: currently vacant; rookies in italics; Roster updated February 2, 2016; 27 Active, 0 Inactive

== Staff ==
Atlanta Vultures staff
Front office: Owners - Barrington Young & Janice Strong; General manager – Barrington Young	Head coach: Head Coach - Cedric Roach; Assistant coaches: Defensive coordinator – Robert Sims; Linebackers - Terrance Saturday; Fullbacks/Special Teams - Ronald Thomas

== Statistics and records ==
=== Season results ===
Season	League	Division	Regular season				Postseason results
Season	League	Division	Finish	Wins	Losses	Ties	Postseason results
2016	AIF	Southern	folded	1	5	0	

=== Head coaches' records ===
Name	Term	Regular season				Playoffs		Awards
Name	Term	W	L	T	Win%	W	L	Awards
Cedric Roach	2016	1	2	0	.333	—	—	

== 2016 season ==
2016 Atlanta Vultures season
- Owner: Barrington Young; Janice Strong
- General manager: Barrington Young
- Head coach: Cedric Roach
- Home stadium: Georgia International Convention Center; 2000 Convention Center Concourse; Atlanta, GA 30337

Results
- Record: 1–5
- Division place: 7th
- Playoffs: Did not qualify

Key: Win Tie Loss Bye

=== Exhibition ===
All start times were local to home team

Week	Day	Date	Kickoff	Opponent	Results		Location
Week	Day	Date	Kickoff	Opponent	Score	Record	Location
1	Sunday	March 6	3:05pm	at West Michigan Ironmen	L 29–63	0–1	L. C. Walker Arena
2	Sunday	May 22	7:05pm	South Carolina Ravens			Georgia International Convention Center

=== Regular season ===
All start times were local to home team

Week	Day	Date	Kickoff	Opponent	Results		Location
Week	Day	Date	Kickoff	Opponent	Score	Record	Location
1	BYE						
2	BYE						
3	BYE						
4	Sunday	March 20	4:00pm	Savannah Steam	Cancelled		Georgia International Convention Center
5	Saturday	March 26	7:00pm	at Georgia Firebirds	W 40–38	1–0	Albany Civic Center
6	Sunday	April 3	7:05pm	Florida Tarpons	Cancelled		Georgia International Convention Center
7	Saturday	April 9	7:05pm	at Columbus Lions	L 8–65	1–1	Columbus Civic Center
8	Sunday	April 17	7:05pm	at Savannah Steam	L 19–32 (Note: The Atlanta Vultures actually won this game 32–19, however, the AIF ruled they had used illegal players and reversed the score instead of just changing the game to a forfeit. The Vultures would fold later that week. Remaining games were all considered 0–2 losses by forfeit in the AIF standings)	1–2	Savannah Civic Center
9	BYE						
~~10~~	~~Sunday~~	~~May 1~~	~~7:05pm~~	~~Myrtle Beach Freedom~~			~~Georgia International Convention Center~~
~~11~~	~~Saturday~~	~~May 7~~	~~7:05pm~~	~~Central Florida Jaguars~~			~~Georgia International Convention Center~~
~~12~~	~~Monday~~	~~May 16~~	~~7:00pm~~	~~at Myrtle Beach Freedom~~			~~Myrtle Beach Convention Center~~
~~13~~	~~BYE~~						
~~14~~	~~BYE~~						

=== Standings ===
2016 AIF Southern standings
Team	W	L	PCT
y – Columbus Lions	8	0	1.000
x – Florida Tarpons	7	1	.875
x – Myrtle Beach Freedom	4	4	.500
x – Savannah Steam	3	5	.375
Georgia Firebirds	3	5	.375
Central Florida Jaguars	2	6	.250
Atlanta Vultures	1	7	.125
