= Ronnie Ghent =

American football player and coach (born 1980)

No. 85, 86, 0
- Position: Fullback

Personal information
- Born: January 5, 1980 (age 46); Lakeland, Florida, U.S.
- Listed height: 6 ft 2 in (1.88 m)
- Listed weight: 253 lb (115 kg)

Career information
- High school: Lakeland
- College: Louisville
- NFL draft: 2004: undrafted

Career history

Playing
- Philadelphia Eagles (2004)*; Cincinnati Bengals (2004–2007)*; New Orleans Saints (2007); New York Sentinels (2009); Hartford Colonials (2010); Virginia Destroyers (2011); Orlando Predators (2012)
- * Offseason or practice squad member only

Coaching
- Central Florida Jaguars (2016)

Awards and highlights
- UFL champion (2011); 4× First-team All-Conference USA (2000–2003)

Career AFL statistics
- Rushing attempts: 8
- Rushing yards: 22
- Stats at ArenaFan.com
- Stats at Pro Football Reference

Ronnie Jerome Ghent (born January 5, 1980) is an American former professional football player who was a fullback for the New Orleans Saints of the National Football League (NFL). He played college football for the Louisville Cardinals and was signed by the Philadelphia Eagles as an undrafted free agent in 2004. Ghent was a member of the Cincinnati Bengals, New Orleans Saints, New York Sentinels and Hartford Colonials. After his playing career, he was the head coach of the Central Florida Jaguars of the American Indoor Football (AIF) in 2016.

== Early life ==
Ghent attended Lakeland Senior High School in Lakeland, Florida, and was a letterman in football, basketball, and track. In football, he was a three-year letterman and as a senior, he was named as a first-team All-Polk County selection by the Tampa Tribune. Ghent graduated in 1999.

== Coaching career ==
On November 24, 2015, it was announced that Ghent would return to his hometown of Lakeland to serve as the inaugural head coach for the Central Florida Jaguars of American Indoor Football.
