= Maurice Purify =

American football player and coach (born 1986)

No. 2, 12
- Position: Wide receiver

Personal information
- Born: January 17, 1986 (age 40); Eureka, California, U.S.
- Listed height: 6 ft 3 in (1.91 m)
- Listed weight: 226 lb (103 kg)

Career information
- High school: Eureka (CA)
- College: City College of SF (2004–2005); Nebraska (2006–2007)
- NFL draft: 2008: undrafted

Career history

Playing
- Cincinnati Bengals (2008–2009); Georgia Force (2011); Omaha Nighthawks (2011); Arizona Rattlers (2012–2015); San Jose SaberCats (2015); Arizona Rattlers (2016)

Coaching
- Steel City Menace (2016)* Offensive coordinator; Eureka (CA) HS (2017–2019) Wide receivers/defensive backs coach; College of the Redwoods (2022–present) Wide receivers coach

Awards and highlights
- 4× ArenaBowl champion (2012, 2013, 2014, 2015); First-team All-Arena (2012); Second-team All-Arena (2011); AFL Rookie of the Year (2011); AFL's Big Game Breakout Player of the Year (2011); Second-team All-Big 12 (2006)

Career NFL statistics
- Total tackles: 6
- Stats at Pro Football Reference

Career AFL statistics
- Receptions: 488
- Receiving yards: 6,769
- Receiving touchdowns: 167
- Stats at ArenaFan.com

Maurice "Mo" Purify (born January 17, 1986) is an American football coach and former wide receiver who is currently the wide receivers coach for College of the Redwoods. He was signed by the Cincinnati Bengals as an undrafted free agent in 2008. He played college football at Nebraska. Purify also played for the Georgia Force, Arizona Rattlers, and San Jose SaberCats of the Arena Football League; scoring over 150 touchdowns, amassing over 6,000 receiving yards, and winning four consecutive ArenaBowls with two teams during his career..

== Early life ==
Purify was born in Eureka, California and attended Eureka High School.

== College career ==
=== San Francisco City College ===
Purify originally attended San Francisco City College. As a freshman in 2004, he recorded 24 receptions for 444 yards and 11 touchdowns. In 2005, he recorded 68 receptions for 1,318 yards and 19 touchdowns as a sophomore and earned California Community College Football Coaches Association First-team All-America honors and Region I First-team All-California honors. He helped the team to a 10–2 season that ended with a 41–38 loss in the junior college state championship game, a game in which he earned offensive MVP honors.

==== Basketball career ====
While at SFCC, Purify also played on the school's basketball team. As a sophomore, he earned First-team junior college All-state honors as he helped lead the team to the semifinals of the 2006 California Community Colleges Commission on Athletics Men's Basketball Championship. For his basketball achievements, Purify was named the Community Colleges Commission on Athletics/U.S. Bank Student-Athlete of the Month for March.

After his two years at SFCC, Purify earned a five-star rating from Scout.com, was a four-star recruit by Rivals.com and earned First-team JC-Gridwire All-America honors. He received offers from Arizona, Kentucky, Oregon State, and Washington. He chose Nebraska.

=== Nebraska ===
As a junior, Purify played in all 14 games, including five starts. He recorded at least four receptions three times during the season, with a career-high six receptions at Oklahoma State. He recorded career-highs of 91 yards against Kansas and two touchdown receptions at Oklahoma State.

As a senior in 2007, caught 57 passes for 814 yards and nine touchdowns, including seven games with five or more receptions. His 57 catches were the second-most in NU history, trailing only teammate Marlon Lucky's total in 2007. The 814 yards ranked third on the Nebraska single-season list and were the most by a Husker since Rodgers in 1972, while Purify's nine touchdown catches were second on the single-season list as well.

While at Nebraska, Purify majored in criminal justice and volunteered his time as an American Education Week speaker and as part of Nebraska's team hospital visits.

=== Career summary ===
Purify finished his career ranked sixth on the Nebraska career receptions list with 91 and fifth in receiving yards with 1,444. His 16 career touchdowns also placed him second on the Nebraska career charts, trailing only 1972 Heisman winner Johnny Rodgers. Purify played in 25 games with nine starts in his career.

== Professional career ==
Pre-draft measurables
Height	Weight	40-yard dash	10-yard split	20-yard split	20-yard shuttle	Three-cone drill	Vertical jump	Broad jump
6 ft 3 1/8 in (1.91 m)	224 lb (102 kg)	4.50 s	1.50 s	2.58 s	4.29 s	6.95 s	36.0 in (0.91 m)	10 ft 3 in (3.12 m)
All values from NFL Combine/Pro Day

=== Cincinnati Bengals ===
Purify went undrafted in the 2008 NFL draft, however, he was signed by the Cincinnati Bengals on May 8. He played in all four preseason games, with three receptions for 25 yards. He was waived on August 30 and signed the next day to Bengals practice squad. He was then released on September 23 and re-signed October 22 to practice squad, where he spent the rest of the season.

In 2009, Purify played in all four preseason games recording four receptions for 46 yards. Then, he was signed from the practice squad on November 13 and made his NFL debut during week nine at Pittsburgh, where he played on offense and recorded one special teams tackle. On December 16, he was released and added to the practice squad. Purify played in a total of five regular season games, as he helped the Bengals win the 2009 AFC North Division Championship.

=== Georgia Force ===
Purify signed with the Georgia Force of the Arena Football League on November 19, 2010. He finished the 2011 season with 129 catches for 1,650 yards and 46 receiving touchdowns and was named the AFL's Rookie of the Year, Breakout Player of the Year, and was named to the AFL All-Arena Second team.

=== Omaha Nighthawks ===
Purify was signed by the Omaha Nighthawks of the United Football League on July 11, 2011. He was placed on the injured reserve list on August 30.

=== Arizona Rattlers ===
Purify signed with the Arizona Rattlers for the 2012 Arena Football League season. Purify and teammate Nick Davila lead the Rattlers to an ArenaBowl XXV victory over the Philadelphia Soul. Purify was named First-team All-Arena as a wide receiver.

Purify re-signed with the Rattlers for the 2013 season. Purify missed most of the season due to injury but returned late in the season to help lead the Rattlers to ArenaBowl XXVI. The Rattlers once again defeated the Soul, with Purify catching 2 touchdown passes during the game.

Purify was on the injured reserve for the first 7 weeks of the 2015 season before he was released. Purify came back in with the Rattlers and tried out to join the team again but Purify decided to not sign with the team and explore different options.

=== San Jose SaberCats ===
On June 30, 2015, Purify was assigned to the San Jose SaberCats.

=== Return to Arizona Rattlers ===
Purfiy was assigned to the Arizona Rattlers on March 24, 2016.

== Coaching career ==
On December 17, 2015, Purify was named head coach of the Northshore Gators of American Indoor Football. On December 29, 2015, Purify said he left the Gators to take the offensive coordinator position with the Steel City Menace.
