= Pueblo Punishers =

American indoor football team

- Current season
Logo

General information
- Founded: 2025
- Headquartered: Pueblo, Colorado at the Southwest Motors Events Center
- Colors: Purple, silver, black, white
- PuebloPunishers.com

Personnel
- Owner: Lisa Rohrich
- Head coach: Tae Brooks & Clinton Solomon (Co-Head Coaches)

Team history
- Pueblo Punishers (2026–)

Home fields
- Southwest Motors Events Center (2026–)

League / conference affiliations
- National Arena League (2026–)

The Pueblo Punishers is a professional indoor football team of the National Arena League scheduled to begin play for its 2026 season. Based in Pueblo, Colorado, the Punishers will play their home games at the Southwest Motors Events Center.

== History ==
On June 18, 2025, team owner Lisa Rohrich and COO Marley LeClair announced in a radio interview on KIXD their intent to launch the Punishers for the 2026 season, with further information to come at a later press conference. Said press conference took place on August 1, where the Punishers announced their membership in the National Arena League.

The Punishers are set to be the first indoor football team to play in the city of Pueblo since the Pueblo Pistols played their only season as a member of the National Indoor Football League in 2007 before the team and league folded. Another team called the Steel City Menace was based in Pueblo during their partial season in 2016 as a member of American Indoor Football; however, the team could not finalize a deal with a home arena and folded after two outdoor road games. In addition, the Punishers will be the second NAL team to call Colorado home, joining the Denver-based Colorado Spartans, and Rohrich will be the first female majority owner in the NAL.

== Current roster ==
Pueblo Punisers roster
Quarterbacks: 6 Devond Blair, Jr.; Running backs: 4 Jeff Mack, II.; 9 Jo-El Shaw LB; — Trey Turner; — Daniel Faccone; Wide receivers: — Nehemiah Williams; 7 KeShaun Taylor; — MJ Harris; — Lorenzo Thompson; — Marquis Lawson	Offensive linemen: 1 Jeff Luc DL; 95 Tyrell Thompson DL; — Zackary Schraeder; Defensive linemen: 3 Chris Elmore FB; 10 Stephen Nagbe, Jr.; 13 Rudy Ngougni; — DeAnthony Hall-Steele; 96 Steven Fluker OL	Linebackers: — Jamari Smith; Defensive backs: — Nehemiah Carter; 2 Josh Best; Special teams: — Carlos Vazquez K	Reserve lists: Currently vacant; Rookies in italics; Roster updated March 14, 2024; — Active, Inactive
