= Eureka High School (California) =

Coordinates: 40°47′23.54″N 124°9′29.52″W

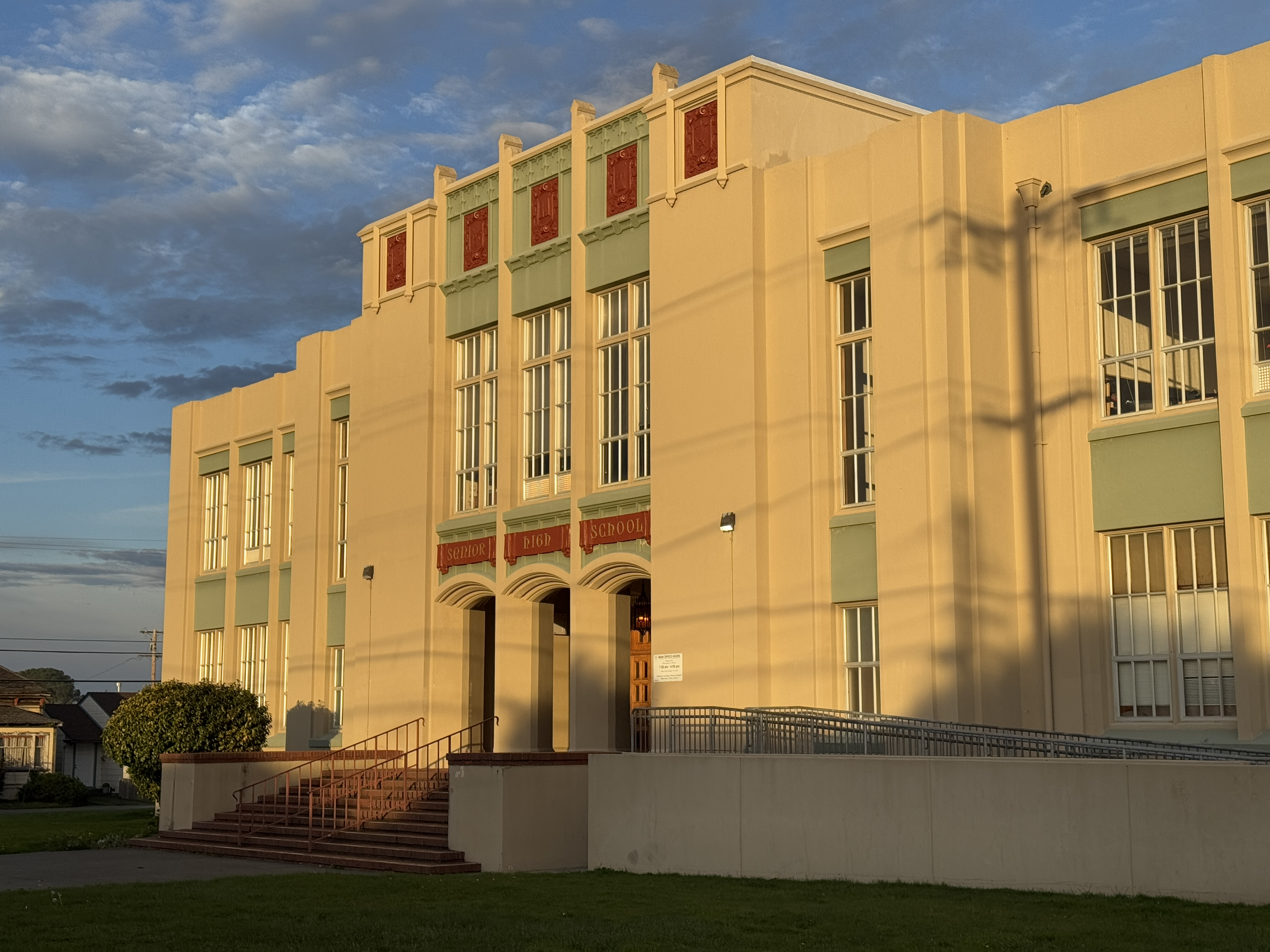
- Eureka High School in December 2024.

Location
- 1915 J St. Eureka, California 95501; United States

Information
- Type: Public high school
- Established: January 1896
- School district: Eureka High School District/ Eureka Unified High School District
- Principal: Robert Standish
- Teaching staff: 52.74 (FTE)
- Grades: 9 to 12
- Student to teacher ratio: 23.25
- Campus size: 10+ acres
- Colors: Red and Green
- Athletics: Big 4 League, Humboldt - Del Norte Conference
- Mascot: Logger
- Team name: Eureka High Loggers
- Newspaper: Redwood Bark
- Athletic facilities: Albee Stadium, Jay Willard Gymnasium
- Website: ehs.eurekacityschools.org

Eureka High School or EHS, formerly Eureka Senior High School, is a public high school in Eureka, California. EHS is the only regular public high school serving the City of Eureka and all of its contiguous unincorporated neighborhoods, several adjacent unincorporated communities, and related independent elementary school districts, which, altogether, comprise the Eureka Unified High School District. Administrated as part of Eureka City Schools, it is the largest high school in Humboldt County.

== History ==
Established in 1896, Eureka High School was the first high school on the far North Coast of California. The current main Eureka High School building, at 1900 J Street, is a Gothic Revival structure originally built in 1925 as the Eureka Junior High. The building was designed by John J. Donovan of Oakland and built by James McLaughlin of San Francisco. The site occupied by the current science building is on the location of the original high school main building, built by W. H. Weeks in 1914-1915, which was demolished after analysis deemed it too damaged to save following damage from earthquakes, culminating in the early 1960s. It was remarkably similar to a high school Weeks designed for Santa Cruz, which survives and is in use to this day.

As the school year began in September 1981, Eureka City Schools consolidated the high school from a junior high/senior high system to a middle school/high school configuration, thus changing the name from Eureka Senior High School to Eureka High School, as the administration endeavored to manage effects of declining enrollment. From that time Freshmen have attended the school along with Sophomores, Juniors, and Seniors.

In 2010, there was an earthquake off of Humboldt County, California. The school auditorium (located in the main building) was closed because of concerns related to structural security. It was reopened in late 2011.

In 2025, Eureka High School was a prominent filming location for the Paul Thomas Anderson film One Battle After Another.

== Mascot and school colors ==
The Eureka High School mascot is the Logger, based on the logging industry which is a major economic industry of the area. The school colors of EHS are red and green and are based on the redwood tree (red bark/wood, green foliage) and extensive forests of the region.

== Academic programs ==
Course offerings include the following programs:

- Advanced Placement
- Learning Pathways (high school majors program)
- NJROTC(defunct)
- EAST

== Athletics ==
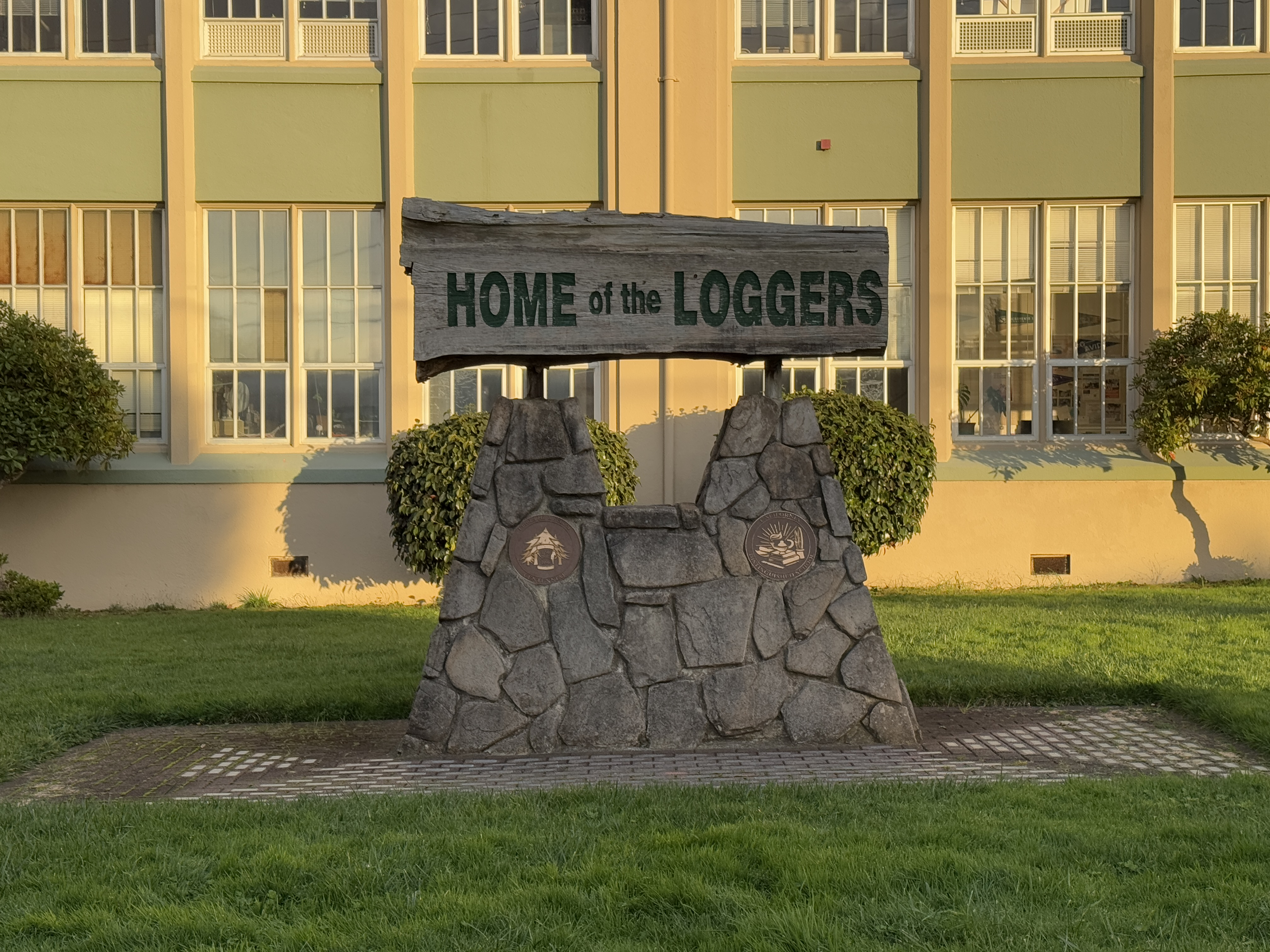
A wooden sign, made from a log, celebrating the Loggers in December 2024.

Eureka High School is a member of the Humboldt–Del Norte Big 4 League. In 2009, Eureka High School made it to the NCS Division 2 finals for football where they ultimately faced Montgomery High School of Santa Rosa, CA. The Loggers won the division title, handily.

- Baseball
- Basketball
- Cheerleading
- Color guard
- Cross Country
- Golf
- Football
- Soccer
- Softball
- Tennis (Men's and Women's)
- Track and Field
- Volleyball
- Wrestling

== Arts and music ==
- Jazz Ensemble and Jazz Band
- Instrumental Music- Concert Band and Orchestra
- Choir- Concert Choir and Limited Edition, The top-tier audition-only vocal jazz Choir
- Theater
- Yurok language

== Notable alumni ==
- Sara Bareilles - singer/songwriter. She performed in the high school production of "Little Shop of Horrors."
- Trevor Dunn - bassist for Mr. Bungle and Fantomas
- Don Durdan - professional football player for the San Francisco 49ers
- Dave Harper - professional football player for the Dallas Cowboys
- Jake Hanson - football player
- Rey Maualuga - LB for the Cincinnati Bengals
- Al Norgard - professional football player for the Green Bay Packers
- Mike Patton - singer for bands Faith No More and Mr. Bungle, among others. Mr. Bungle played their Senior Talent Show. Patton took AP courses.
- Maurice Purify - professional football player for the Cincinnati Bengals
- Trey Spruance - guitarist for Mr. Bungle and Secret Chiefs 3
