= Al Norgard =

American football player (1907–1975)

No. 62, 19
- Position: End

Personal information
- Born: November 3, 1907; Fort Bragg, California,
- Died: November 20, 1975 (aged 68); California
- Listed height: 6 ft 1 in (1.85 m)
- Listed weight: 194 lb (88 kg)

Career information
- High school: Eureka (CA)
- College: Stanford

Career history
- Green Bay Packers (1934)

Career statistics
- Receptions: 3
- Receiving yards: 29
- Touchdowns: 0
- Stats at Pro Football Reference

Alvar Alfred Norgard (November 3, 1907 – November 20, 1975) was an end in the National Football League who played for the Green Bay Packers. Norgard played collegiate ball for Stanford University before playing professional ball for one season in 1934. Norgard retired the same year.
