= Georgia Firebirds =

Logo

General information
- Founded: 2009
- Folded: 2017
- Headquartered: Albany, Georgia at the Albany Civic Center
- Colors: Black, red, yellow, white
- Mascot: Talon
- GeorgiaFirebirds.com

Personnel
- Owner: Gridiron Central Group
- CEO: Terence Fowler
- General manager: Darien Teals
- President: Darien Teals

Team history
- Albany Firebirds (2009–2015); Georgia Firebirds (2016–2017)

Home fields
- Albany Civic Center (2016–2017)

League / conference affiliations
- American Indoor Football (2016): Southern Division (2016); National Arena League (2017)

The Georgia Firebirds were a professional indoor football team based in Albany, Georgia, and played their home games at the Albany Civic Center. Previously, the Firebirds played as an outdoor football team in various semi-pro leagues before going indoor. The Firebirds joined American Indoor Football (AIF) for the 2016 season but the league folded after one season. The Firebirds then joined the new National Arena League (NAL) for the 2017 season.

The Firebirds were the third indoor/arena football team to call Albany home, following the South Georgia Wildcats of af2 (which played in Albany from 2005 until the league folded in 2009) and the Albany Panthers of the Southern Indoor Football League and later the Professional Indoor Football League (which played from 2010 until 2013, winning the 2011 SIFL and 2012 PIFL championships).

== History ==
On November 18, 2015, the Firebirds finalized the contract with the city of Albany, Georgia, and the Albany Civic Center, to play indoor football for the 2016 season after several years playing as a semi-professional outdoor team.

On March 20, 2016, the Firebirds lost their first league game as part of American Indoor Football to the Columbus Lions by a score of 86–0. The following day, head coach Davis Daniels, Jr. was fired and replaced by Antwone Savage. They finished the season one spot out of a playoff position after being forced to forfeit their final game of the season due to their team bus breaking down.

In July 2016, the AIF ceased operations leaving the Firebirds without a league. On September 13, the team announced it had joined the newly formed Arena Developmental League (which became the National Arena League) for the 2017 season. In May 2017, the league apparently took over operations of the Firebirds for the remainder of the season. As a result, the league cancelled the Firebirds' away game at the Corpus Christi Rage (another team the league was operating) as a cost-cutting measure.

The National Arena League announced in September 2017 that the Firebirds were undergoing an ownership transition but could not commit to the 2018 season while the new ownership were negotiating a new arena lease. By November, the new owners failed to obtain the new lease and were removed from the league as members.

== Statistics and records ==
=== Season-by-season results ===
| League champions | Conference champions | Division champions | Playoff berth | League leader |

| Season | Team | League | Conference | Division | Regular season | | | | Postseason results |
| Season | Team | League | Conference | Division | Finish | Wins | Losses | Ties | Postseason results |
|---|---|---|---|---|---|---|---|---|---|
| 2016 | 2016 | AIF | | Southern | | 4 | 5 | 0 | |
| 2017 | 2017 | NAL | | | 6th | 2 | 9 | 0 | |
| Totals | | | | | | 6 | 14 | 0 | All-time record (2016–2017) |

=== Head coaches' records ===
Note: Statistics are correct through the end of the 2017 National Arena League season.

| Name | Term | Regular season | | | | Playoffs | | Awards |
| Name | Term | W | L | T | Win% | W | L | Awards |
|---|---|---|---|---|---|---|---|---|
| David Daniels, Jr. | 2016 | 0 | 1 | 0 | .000 | — | — | |
| Antwone Savage | 2016–2017 | 6 | 13 | 0 | .316 | — | — | |

== Notable players ==
See Category:Georgia Firebirds players
