= 2016 American Indoor Football season =

- League: American Indoor Football
- Sport: Indoor football
- Duration: February 27, 2016 – May 23, 2016

2016

Playoffs
- Northern champions: West Michigan Ironmen
- Northern runners-up: Lehigh Valley Steelhawks
- Southern champions: Columbus Lions
- Southern runners-up: Florida Tarpons

2016 AIF Championship Game
- Champions: Columbus Lions
- Runners-up: West Michigan Ironmen

AIF seasons
- ← 2015 2024 →

The 2016 American Indoor Football season was the eleventh and final season of the second incarnation American Indoor Football (AIF). The regular season began February 27, 2016, and ended on May 23, 2016. Each team played a game schedule of varying lengths.

== League changes ==
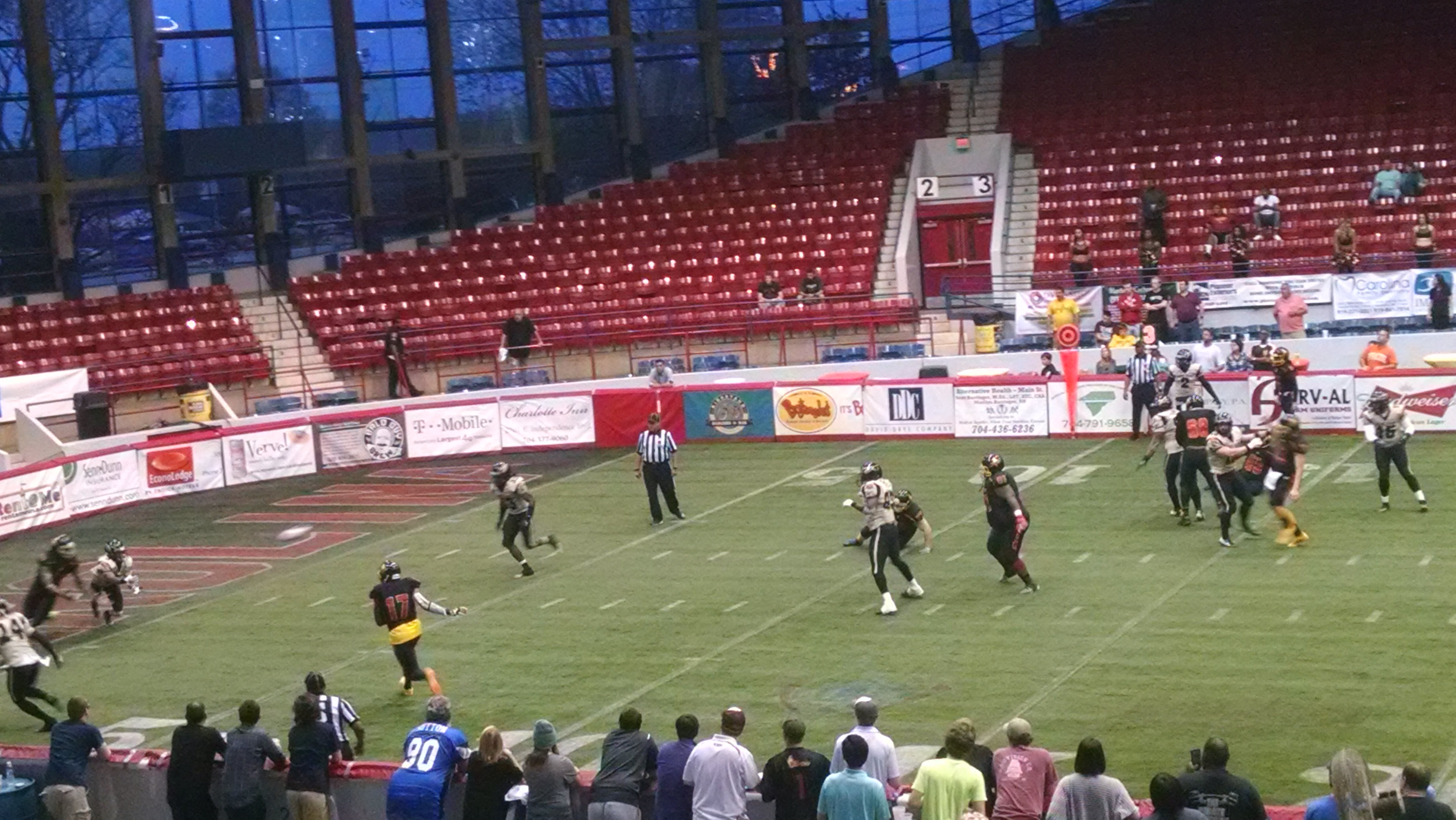
Lehigh Valley Steelhawks vs. Triangle Torch at Dorton Arena in Raleigh, North Carolina, March 25, 2016

During the offseason there were several membership changes in the league that saw only four of the nine teams return from the previous season. However, the league would end up starting the season with 18 full member teams, two travel only teams, and one affiliated provisional team.

=== Returning teams ===
- Chicago Blitz returned for their second season in the AIF. However, the team would cancel its last game and announce the team was for sale at the end of the season.
- Maryland Eagles returned for their fourth season in the AIF. As was the case in 2015, the Eagles would only play a handful of games in AIF late in the season as a travel-only team, whilst playing the majority of their games in the Major Indoor Football League.
- Savannah Steam returned for their second season in the AIF.

=== Relocating teams ===
- York Capitals relocated to Harrisburg, Pennsylvania and were renamed Central Penn Capitals.

=== Leaving teams ===
- ASI Panthers left league with plans to operate independently and were briefly associated with Supreme Indoor Football.
- Atlanta Sharks folded but were at one point listed on schedules for the Indoor Football Alliance.
- Buffalo Lightning left league and then joined Supreme Indoor Football. Ended up playing as an independent when the SIF failed to launch in 2016.
- Cleveland Saints folded but were briefly listed on schedules for the Indoor Football Alliance.
- Saginaw Sting first left the league to restart the Continental Indoor Football League, rejoined AIF when that failed, and then suspended operations for the 2016 season.

=== Teams added ===
- Central Florida Jaguars as an expansion team.
- Columbus Lions joined from the recently folded Professional Indoor Football League.
- Florida Tarpons joined from the recently folded X-League Indoor Football.
- Georgia Firebirds as an expansion team.
- Lehigh Valley Steelhawks joined from the recently folded Professional Indoor Football League.
- Myrtle Beach Freedom joined from the recently folded X-League Indoor Football.
- New Mexico Stars joined after being on hiatus, previously were set to be members of Champions Indoor Football. With the loss of several Western Division teams, the Stars played many rescheduled games but never cancelled a home date.
- Northern Kentucky Nightmare were added as a travel-only team to fill in the schedule after many teams suspended operations just prior to the season.
- River City Raiders, formerly known as the St. Louis Attack, joined from the recently folded X-League Indoor Football.
- Triangle Torch as an expansion team.
- West Michigan Ironmen as an expansion team.
- Winston Wildcats as an expansion team.

=== Expansion teams that folded mid-season ===
- Atlanta Vultures were added as an expansion team to replace the departed Atlanta Sharks. Folded mid-season with a 2–1 record due to lack of usable turf in their home arena. The team's last win against the Savannah Steam was reversed by the league and all remaining scheduled league games were ruled as 0-2 losses in the league standings.
- Corpus Christi Fury joined from the recently folded X-League Indoor Football. The team cancelled several games during the season and only played one game against an AIF member. While never announced by the team itself, the Fury appeared to have folded before their May 15 game against the New Mexico Stars, giving the Stars 24-hours notice that they would be unable to make the game. They also announced their May 22 home game was cancelled on the day of the game over social media without explanation.
- Philadelphia Yellow Jackets as an expansion team. The team had to cancel/forfeit two of their last three home games due to their arena lease being voided on May 11. They rescheduled their last home game to the home arena of the Central Penn Capitals but apparently folded instead.
- Steel City Menace were added as an expansion team. Originally were going to be named "Mile High Menace" and play in Denver but relocated to Pueblo, Colorado and were renamed. The team folded mid-season after two league road games and not having a home arena. During their first exhibition away game they wore a local high school's uniform and during their April 9 game against the New Mexico Stars they wore white practice jerseys with numbers made of red duct tape. Even though the team folded in mid-April, the AIF listed the New Mexico Stars' 90–6 win over the local Capital City Warriors as a league game against the Menace.

=== Failed expansion teams ===
- Abilene Warriors were announced as an expansion team but failed to obtain a home arena.
- Austin Colts were added mid-season from North American Indoor Football as an expansion team on March 31 but backed out of their first game less than a week before it was scheduled to be played.
- Louisiana Cottonmouths were announced as an expansion team but never materialized.
- Marion Blue Racers were added from the recently folded X-League Indoor Football but suspended operations prior to the season. The owner later announced it was selling off all the Blue Racers assets and the team would not be returning.
- Northshore Gators were announced as an expansion team but never materialized.
- Pineywoods Bucks were announced as an expansion team but never materialized.
- Texas Stealth were announced as an expansion team but re-joined the local North American Indoor Football instead before the season started.

== Regular season ==
2016 AIF Northern standings
Team	W	L	PCT
y – West Michigan Ironmen	6	1	.857
x – River City Raiders	6	1	.857
x – Lehigh Valley Steelhawks	6	2	.750
Philadelphia Yellow Jackets	4	3	.571
Central Penn Capitals	4	4	.500
Chicago Blitz	3	3	.500
Triangle Torch	3	4	.429
Winston Wildcats	3	5	.375
Maryland Eagles	0	2	.000
Northern Kentucky Nightmare	0	5	.000

2016 AIF Southern standings
Team	W	L	PCT
y – Columbus Lions	8	0	1.000
x – Florida Tarpons	7	1	.875
x – Myrtle Beach Freedom	4	4	.500
x – Savannah Steam	3	5	.375
Georgia Firebirds	3	5	.375
Central Florida Jaguars	2	6	.250
Atlanta Vultures	1	7	.125

2016 AIF Western Standings
Team	W	L	PCT
y – New Mexico Stars	6	1	.857
Corpus Christi Fury	2	1	.667
Steel City Menace	0	2	.000

== Playoffs ==
Division Semi-Finals
1	West Michigan	78
4*	Myrtle Beach	37
Northern Division
2	River City	52
3	Lehigh Valley	54
1	Columbus	49
4	New Mexico	37
Southern Division
2	Florida	71
3*	Savannah	20

Division Championships
1	West Michigan	42
3	Lehigh Valley	35
1	Columbus	79
2	Florida	66

2016 AIF Championship
N1	West Michigan	32
S1	Columbus	74

* — When initially announced, the West Michigan Ironmen were set to play the Northern Division's fourth-seeded Central Penn Capitals. On May 30, the Capitals were replaced with the Southern Division's third-seeded Myrtle Beach Freedom. The Freedom were replaced by the Southern Division's fourth-seed, the Savannah Steam.
