= Southwest Motors Events Center =

Multi-purpose arena in Pueblo, Colorado

Coordinates: 38.250086°N 104.642458°W

- Interactive map of Southwest Motors Events Center
- Former names: Colorado State Fair Events Center (1995-2012)
- Address: 1001 Beulah Ave; Pueblo, CO 81004-2415
- Location: Colorado State Fairgrounds
- Owner: Colorado Department of Agriculture
- Capacity: 8,225

Construction
- Opened: August 24, 1995
- Cost: $7 million ($15.6 million in 2025 dollars)

Tenant
- Pueblo Punishers (NAL) (2026–)

The Southwest Motors Events Center (originally the Colorado State Fair Events Center) is a multi-purpose arena located in Pueblo, Colorado. The arena is located on the northwest corner of the Colorado State Fairgrounds and is predominantly used during the Colorado State Fair. The venue can host an array of events, including: concerts, professional bull riding, indoor football, basketball games and monster truck shows.

Beginning in 2026 it will be the home of the Pueblo Punishers of the National Arena League.

== About ==
The arena was purposed in 1990 initially to replace the aging Grandstand at the Colorado State Fair. At first, an outdoor amphitheater was purposed. However, this was later dismissed in favor of the arena and a year-round use. The arena was also a draw for big-name acts to perform in the Pueblo area, thus a need for it to be bigger than the Massari Arena. Construction began in 1993 during the fair's off season. The arena opened August 23, 1995, with a performance by Petra.

In 2016, it was to be home to the Steel City Menace of American Indoor Football, however, the contract with the Menace fell through and the team played at an outdoor field prior to folding mid-season.
