= Steel City Menace =

Professional indoor football team

Logo

General information
- Founded: 2015
- Folded: 2016
- Headquartered: Pueblo, Colorado (travel team)
- Colors: Orange, black, gray, white
- Steel City Menace website

Personnel
- Owner: Idale Graves
- General manager: Terrence Foster
- Head coach: Terrence Foster (interim)

Team history
- Mile High Menace (planning stages); Steel City Menace (2016)

Home fields
- Southwest Motors Events Center (originally announced but never used)

League / conference affiliations
- American Indoor Football (2016): Western Division (2016)

The Steel City Menace were a professional indoor football team and a member of American Indoor Football that played part of the 2016 season. Originally based in Pueblo, Colorado, the Menace were to play their home games at the Southwest Motors Events Center, however, they ended up playing at an outdoor field and the two regular season league games they played were on the road.

The Menace were the second indoor football team to call Pueblo home, after the Pueblo Pistols which played in the National Indoor Football League for the 2007 season before the team and the league folded.

Originally, the Menace were going to be known as the Mile High Menace and play at the Magness Arena in Denver.

During their first exhibition home game at West Texas, they wore a local high school's uniform (Centennial High School). The team folded mid-season after two league road games and not having a home arena. The head coach, Terry Foster, left the team to coach the Myrtle Beach Freedom on April 19, 2016.

== Roster ==
2016 Steel City Menace roster
Quarterbacks: -- Levi Thompson; -- Travio Ward; Running backs: -- Triston McCarthen; Wide receivers: -- Ronnie Brown; -- Preston Davis; -- Raliek Greene; -- DaVaughn Thornton; -- Kevin Weatherspoon	Offensive linemen: -- Adrian Cabrera; -- Jerome Cook; -- Jesse Merritt; -- Kevin Smith; -- Josh White; Defensive linemen: -- JeRyl Christian; -- Kyle Connors; -- Bruce Franks; -- Christopher Murray	Linebackers: -- Isaiah Keyes; -- Lavar Ledbetter; -- Marcus Sanders; -- Jerimiah Spicer; Defensive backs: -- Artwaun Steele; -- Ramar Watson; -- Jemichael Williams; Kickers: -- Merf Trout	Injured reserve: currently vacant; Exempt list: currently vacant; Practice squad: currently vacant; rookies in italics; Roster updated December 7, 2015; 24 Active, 0 Inactive

== Staff ==
Steel City Menace staff
Front office: Owner – Idale Graves	Head coach: Interim head coach – Terrence Foster; Assistant coaches: Offensive coordinator – Maurice Purify; Defensive coordinator – Antone Huntter; Offensive assistant – Joseph Nason

== Statistics and records ==
=== Season results ===
Season	Team	League	Division	Regular season				Postseason results
Season	Team	League	Division	Finish	Wins	Losses	Ties	Postseason results
2016	2016	AIF	Western	folded	0	2	0	

=== Head coaches' records ===
Name	Term	Regular season				Playoffs		Awards
Name	Term	W	L	T	Win%	W	L	Awards
Terrence Foster	2016	0	2	0	.000	—	—	

== 2016 season ==
2016 Steel City Menace season
- Owner: Idale Graves
- General manager: Terrence Foster
- Head coach: Terrence Foster

Results
- Record: 0–2
- Division place: 3rd
- Playoffs: Did not qualify

Key: Win Tie Loss Bye

=== Exhibition games ===
All start times were local to home team

Week	Day	Date	Kickoff	Opponent	Results		Location
Week	Day	Date	Kickoff	Opponent	Score	Record	Location
1	Saturday	March 19	5:00pm	at West Texas Renegades	W 32–12	1–0	Taylor County Expo Center

=== Regular season ===
All start times were local to home team

Week	Day	Date	Kickoff	Opponent	Results		Location
Week	Day	Date	Kickoff	Opponent	Score	Record	Location
1	BYE						
2	BYE						
3	Friday	March 11	7:05pm	at New Mexico Stars	L 14–34	0–1	Santa Ana Star Center
4	BYE						
5	BYE						
6	BYE						
7	Saturday	April 9	7:05pm	at New Mexico Stars	L 2–47	0–2	Santa Ana Star Center
8	BYE						
~~9~~	~~Saturday~~	~~April 23~~	~~7:05pm~~	~~New Mexico Stars~~			~~Southwest Motors Events Center~~
~~10~~	~~Saturday~~	~~April 30~~	~~7:05pm~~	~~at Corpus Christi Fury~~			~~American Bank Center~~
~~11~~	~~Saturday~~	~~May 7~~	~~5:00pm~~	~~at New Mexico Stars~~			~~Santa Ana Star Center~~
~~12~~	~~BYE~~						
~~13~~	~~BYE~~						
~~14~~	~~BYE~~						

=== Standings ===
2016 AIF Western Standings
Team	W	L	PCT
y – New Mexico Stars	6	1	.857
Corpus Christi Fury	2	1	.667
Steel City Menace	0	2	.000
