= Georgia International Convention Center =

Convention center in the U.S. state of Georgia

Coordinates: 33°38′42″N 84°27′24″W

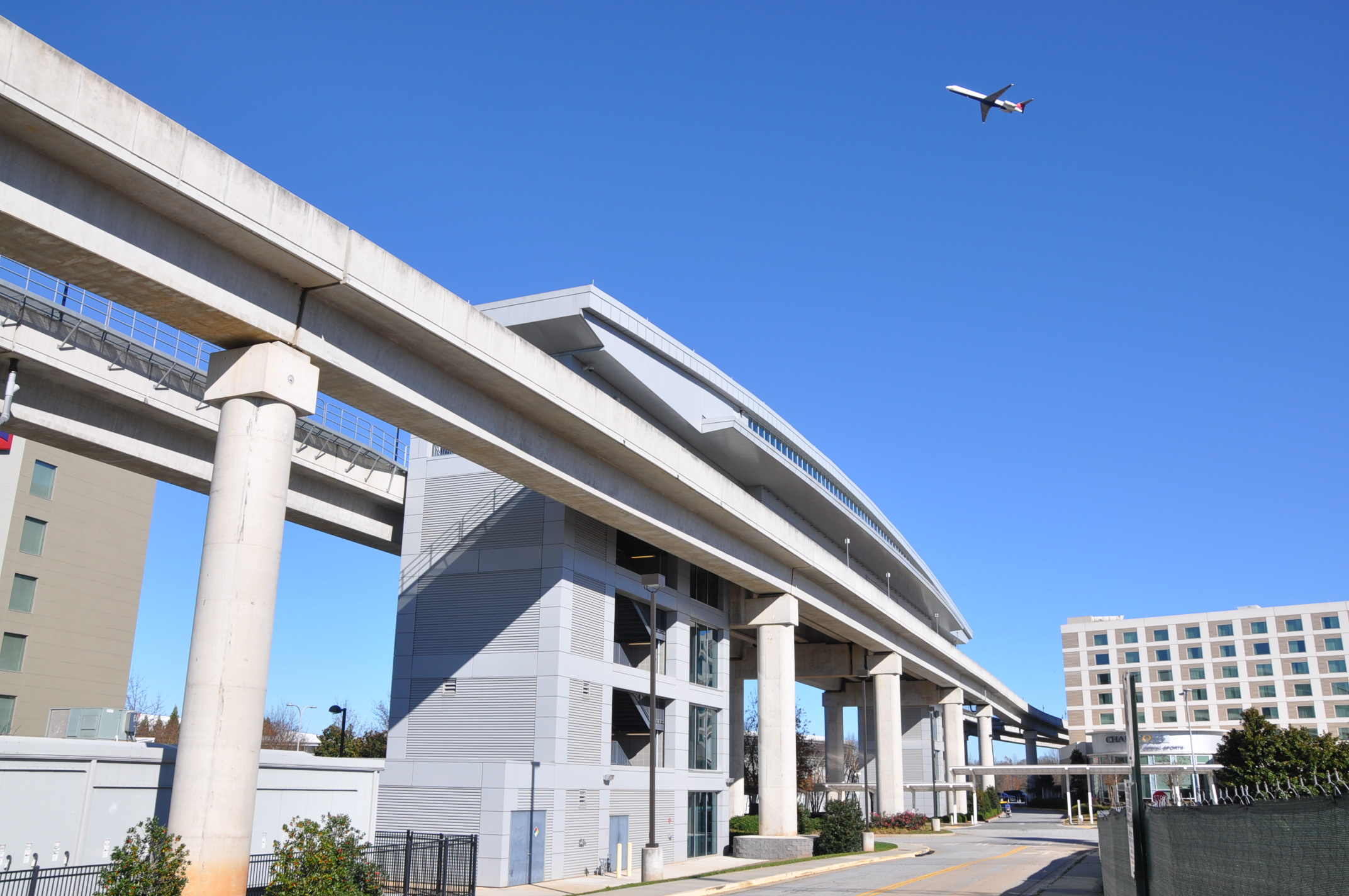
Georgia International Convention Center Skytrain station in College Park, GA

The Georgia International Convention Center or GICC, which officially opened on June 9, 2003, is the second largest convention center in the U.S. state of Georgia, the largest being the Georgia World Congress Center. It is located at 2000 Convention Center Concourse, just off Camp Creek Parkway (S.R. 6) and Roosevelt Highway (U.S. 29) in College Park. The Convention Center is accessible from the Airport MARTA station (via a connection to the ATL Skytrain), Interstate 285, and Interstate 85.

It has a number of exhibit halls, meeting rooms and ballrooms that can be rented.

Behind the Convention Center, the Atlanta Airport people-mover called ATL Skytrain, connects airport patrons with the rental car complex, four hotel accommodations, and restaurants at the Gateway Center of the Georgia International Convention Center. The Georgia International Convention Center is the world’s only convention center directly connected to a major airport.

In 2016, it was to be the home to the Atlanta Vultures of American Indoor Football but they never played a home game due to turf issues.

On November 10, 2016, the Atlanta Hawks announced it had purchased an expansion team to play in the NBA Development League with the intentions of building a new 3,500-seat arena at the Gateway Center to be its home for the 2019–20 season. The expansion team then began play in 2017 as the Erie BayHawks in Erie, Pennsylvania, while the arena was being finished.

On November 8, 2019, the adjacent Gateway Center Arena officially opened. The Gateway Center Arena became home to the WNBA's Atlanta Dream as well as the NBA G League team the College Park Skyhawks.

== Previous location ==
The first Georgia International Convention Center opened in 1985 on nearby Riverdale Road, behind an adjoining Holiday Inn Crowne Plaza hotel. The hotel later operated as the Hyatt Atlanta Airport, the Sheraton Gateway Atlanta Airport, and finally the Sheraton Atlanta Airport. Because of planned runway expansion at the airport, the convention center closed and moved to move to the current location in 2003. The vacant convention center building was used as a film studio for a number of years, and the hotel remained open until 2017, when it was purchased by the city and closed. In 2021, the convention center building was demolished, and the Sheraton hotel was imploded on September 5, 2021.
