= Myrtle Beach Convention Center =

Multi-purpose arena in Myrtle Beach, South Carolina

Coordinates: 33°42′21″N 78°52′27″W

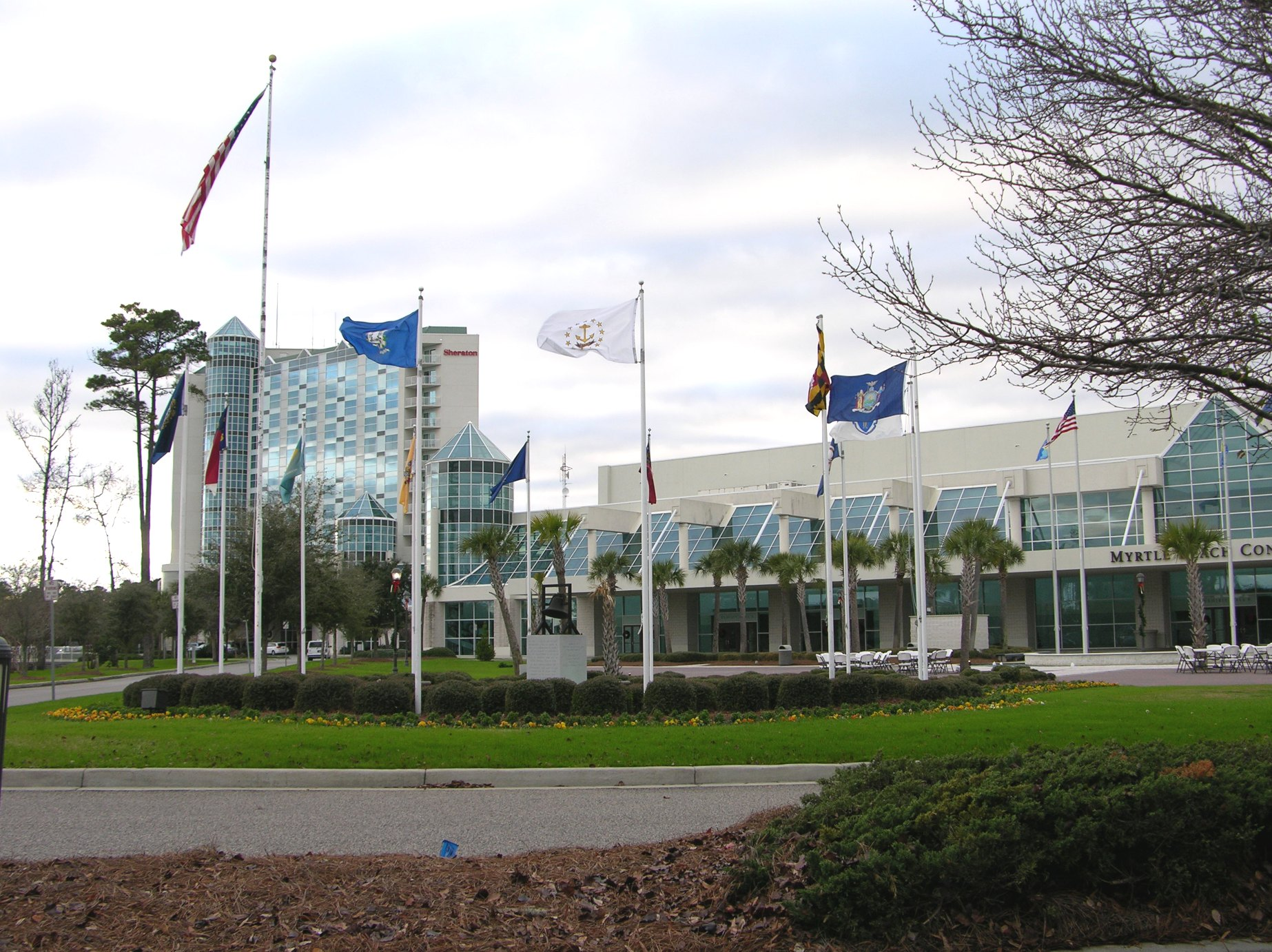
- Interactive map of Myrtle Beach Convention Center
- Address: 2101 North Oak St.
- Capacity: 8,000

Construction
- Opened: October 1967
- Architect: Riddle and Wilkes

Tenants
- Myrtle Beach Stingrays (NIFL) (2003–2004); Myrtle Beach Freedom (AIF) (2016)

Myrtle Beach Convention Center is an 8,000-seat multi-purpose arena in Myrtle Beach, South Carolina. It hosts various local concerts, conventions, and sporting events for the Myrtle Beach area.

== History ==
The original facility opened in October 1967 and was built at a cost of $1.12 million. Riddle and Wilkes were the architects of record. The facility opened with a 2,500 seat auditorium.

The South Carolina Hall of Fame has been located on the convention center grounds since 1973.

The center was expanded in 1993-94.

The convention center was the site of the January 10, 2008 presidential primary debate. Six Republican presidential hopefuls attended the debate, which was broadcast by Fox News. Four years later, the convention hosted five candidates in a January 16, 2012 Republican presidential primary debate, also broadcast by Fox News.

On March 9, 2021, it was announced that the Myrtle Beach Convention Center would be renamed to the John T. Rhodes Myrtle Beach Sports Center in honor of the visionary of the Beach Ball Classic and former Myrtle Beach Mayor John Rhodes. Rhodes served as mayor of Myrtle Beach from 2005 to 2017 and died January 2021 due to COVID-19. Rhodes away also played a crucial role in the creation of the Beach Ball Classic and was even its executive director. Myrtle Beach officials said that the hope to do a formal reveal of the new name sometime in early April. In early 2021, a new logo was revealed to honor the former mayor.

== Sports ==
The convention center was the home arena for the Myrtle Beach Stingrays of the National Indoor Football League in 2003 and one game in 2004. Another indoor football team, the Myrtle Beach Freedom, played at the convention center for one season in 2016.

The convention center has also hosted college basketball tournaments.
